= List of Missouri Valley Football Conference champions =

This is a list of yearly Missouri Valley Football Conference champions. Co-champions are listed in alphabetical order. Italics indicate a school that no longer competes in the MVFC

== Champions by year ==
Note: The conference was known as the Gateway Football Conference prior from 1992-2008. Then, from 1982-92 the conference was known as the Gateway Collegiate Athletic Conference.

		Record		Ranking (Note: Final ranking after the championship game that season)			
Year	Champions	Conference	Overall	STATS (Note: The STATS poll was supplied by The Sports Network prior to 2015)	Coaches	Playoff finish	Head coach
1985	Northern Iowa	5–0	11–2	4	–	NCAA Division I-AA Semifinal 33–41 vs. Georgia Southern	Darrell Mudra
1986	Eastern Illinois	5–1	11–2	3	–	NCAA Division I-AA Quarterfinal 21–28 vs. Eastern Kentucky	Al Molde
1987	Northern Iowa	6–0	10–4	4	–	NCAA Division I-AA Semifinal 41–44^{OT} vs. Louisiana-Monroe	Darrell Mudra
1988	Western Illinois	6–0	10–2	3	–	NCAA Division I-AA Quarterfinal 32–35 vs. Western Kentucky	Bruce Craddock
1989	Missouri State	5–1	10–3	9	–	NCAA Division I-AA Quarterfinal 22–55 vs Stephen F. Austin	Jesse Branch
1990	Missouri State	5–1	9–3	6	–	NCAA Division I-AA First Round 35–41 vs. Idaho	Jesse Branch
1990	Northern Iowa	5–1	8–4	11	–	NCAA Division I-AA First Round 3–20 vs. Boise State	Terry Allen
1991	Northern Iowa	5–1	11–2	4	–	NCAA Division I-AA Quarterfinal 13–41 vs. Marshall	Terry Allen
1992	Northern Iowa	5–1	12–2	3	–	NCAA Division I-AA Semifinal 7–19 vs. Youngstown State	Terry Allen
1993	Northern Iowa	5–1	8–4	13	–	NCAA Division I-AA First Round 21–27^{2OT} at Boston University	Terry Allen
1994	Northern Iowa	6–0	8–4	11	–	NCAA Division I-AA First Round 21–23 at Montana	Terry Allen
1995	Eastern Illinois	5–1	10-2	14	–	NCAA Division I-AA First Round 29–34 at Stephen F. Austin	Bob Spoo
1995	Northern Iowa	5–1	8–5	13	–	NCAA Division I-AA Quarterfinal 24–41 at Marshall	Terry Allen
1996	Northern Iowa	5–0	12–2	3	–	NCAA Division I-AA Semifinal 14–31 at Marshall	Terry Allen
1997	Western Illinois	6–0	11–2	6	–	NCAA Division I-AA Quarterfinal 12–14 vs. McNeese State	Randy Ball
1998	Western Illinois	5–1	11–3	4	–	NCAA Division I-AA Semifinal 14–42 at Georgia Southern	Randy Ball
1999	Illinois State	6–0	11–3	3	–	NCAA Division I-AA Semifinal 17–31 at Georgia Southern	Todd Berry
2000	Western Illinois	5–1	9–3	12	–	NCAA Division I-AA First Round 7–37 vs. Lehigh	Don Patterson
2001	Northern Iowa	6–1	11–3	4	–	NCAA Division I-AA 0–38 at Montana	Mark Farley
2002	Western Illinois	6–1	11–2	5	–	NCAA Division I-AA 28–31 vs. Western Kentucky	Don Patterson
2002	Western Kentucky	6–1	12–3	1	–	National Champion 34–14 vs. McNeese State	Jack Harbaugh
2003	Northern Iowa	6–1	10–3	5	–	NCAA Division I-AA Quarterfinal 7–37 at Delaware	Mark Farley
2003	Southern Illinois	6–1	10–2	9	–	NCAA Division I-AA First Round 7–48 at Delaware	Jerry Kill
2004	Southern Illinois	7–0	10–2	9	–	NCAA Division I-AA First Round 31–35 vs. Eastern Washington	Jerry Kill
2005	Northern Iowa	5–2	11–4	2	–	NCAA Division I-AA Runner-up 16–21 vs. Appalachian State	Mark Farley
2005	Southern Illinois	5–2	9–4	7	–	NCAA Division I-AA Quarterfinal 24–38 at Appalachian State	Jerry Kill
2005	Youngstown State	5–2	8–3	14	–	None	Jon Heacock
2006	Youngstown State	6–1	11–3	4	–	NCAA FCS Semifinal 24–49 at Appalachian State	Jon Heacock
2007	Northern Iowa	6–0	12–1	4	5	NCAA FCS Quarterfinal 27–39 vs. Delaware	Mark Farley
2008	Northern Iowa	7–1	12–3	4	4	NCAA FCS Semifinal 20–21 vs. Richmond	Mark Farley
2008	Southern Illinois	7–1	9–3	11	10	NCAA FCS First Round 20–29 vs. New Hampshire	Dale Lennon
2009	Southern Illinois	8–0	11–2	6	6	NCAA FCS Quarterfinal 3–24 at William & Mary	Dale Lennon
2010	Northern Iowa	6–2	7–5	19	18	NCAA FCS First Round 7–14 vs. Lehigh	Mark Farley
2011	North Dakota State	7–1	14–1	1	1	National Champion 17–6 vs. Sam Houston	Craig Bohl
2012	North Dakota State	7–1	14–1	1	1	National Champion 39–13 vs. Sam Houston	Craig Bohl
2013	North Dakota State	8–0	15–0	1	1	National Champion 35–7 vs. Towson	Craig Bohl
2014	Illinois State	7–1	13–2	2	2	NCAA FCS Runner-up 27–29 vs. North Dakota State	Brock Spack
2014	North Dakota State	7–1	15–1	1	1	National Champion 29–27 vs. Illinois State	Chris Klieman
2015	Illinois State	7–1	10–3	5	5	NCAA FCS Quarterfinal 27–39 vs. Richmond	Brock Spack
2015	North Dakota State	7–1	13–2	1	1	National Champion 37–10 vs. Jacksonville State	Chris Klieman
2016	North Dakota State	7–1	12–2	3	3	NCAA FCS Semifinal 17–27 vs. James Madison	Chris Klieman
2016	South Dakota State	7–1	9–4	6	7	NCAA FCS Quarterfinal 10–36 at North Dakota State	John Stiegelmeier
2017	North Dakota State	7–1	14–1	1	1	National Champion 17–13 vs. James Madison	Chris Klieman
2018	North Dakota State	8–0	15–0	1	1	National Champion 38–24 vs. Eastern Washington	Chris Klieman
2019	North Dakota State	8–0	16–0	1	1	National Champion 28–20 vs. James Madison	Matt Entz
2020 (Note: 2020 season was played in Spring 2021 due to the COVID-19 pandemic)	Missouri State	5–1	5–5	13	13	NCAA FCS First Round 10–44 vs. North Dakota	Bobby Petrino
2020	South Dakota State	5–1	8–2	2	2	NCAA FCS Runner-up 21–23 vs. Sam Houston	John Stiegelmeier
2020	North Dakota	4–1	5–2	6	6	NCAA FCS Quarterfinal 21–34 at James Madison	Bubba Schweigert
2021	North Dakota State	7–1	14–1	1	1	National Champion 38–10 vs. Montana State	Matt Entz
2022	South Dakota State	8–0	14–1	1	1	National Champion 45–21 vs. North Dakota State	John Stiegelmeier
2023	South Dakota State	8–0	15–0	1	1	National Champion 23–3 vs. Montana	Jimmy Rogers
2024	North Dakota State	7–1	14–2	1	1	National Champion 35–32 vs. Montana State	Tim Polasek
2024	South Dakota	7–1	11–3	4	4	NCAA FCS Semifinal 17–31 at Montana State	Bob Nielson
2024	South Dakota State	7–1	12–3	3	3	NCAA FCS Semifinal 21–28 at North Dakota State	Jimmy Rogers
2025	North Dakota State	8–0	12–1	4т	5	NCAA FCS Second Round 28–29 vs Illinois State	Tim Polasek
2026	South Dakota State						

== Championships by team ==
Team	MVFC titles	Outright MVFC titles	Winning years
Northern Iowa	16	10	**1985**, **1987**, 1990, **1991**, **1992**, **1993**, **1994**, 1995, **1996**, **2001**, 2003, 2005, **2007**, 2008, **2010**, 2011
North Dakota State	12	7	2011, **2012**, **2013**, 2014, 2015, 2016, **2017**, **2018**, **2019**, **2021**, 2024, **2025**
South Dakota State	6	2	2016, 2020, **2022**, **2023**, 2024, 2026
Western Illinois	5	4	**1988**, **1997**, **1998**, **2000**, 2002
Southern Illinois	5	2	2003, **2004**, 2005, 2008, **2009**
Missouri State	3	1	**1989**, 1990, 2020
Illinois State	3	1	**1999**, 2014, 2015
Eastern Illinois	2	1	**1986**, 1995
Youngstown State	2	1	2005, **2006**
Western Kentucky	1	0	2002
North Dakota	1	0	2020
South Dakota	1	0	2024
Indiana State	0	0	
Murray State	0	0	
Total	–	28	

Keys

- **Bold** indicates an outright conference championship
- Italics indicates a school currently not a member of the MVFC, as of the 2026 season

== Championships by head coach ==
Head coach	School	MVFC Championships
Terry Allen	Northern Iowa	7
Mark Farley	Northern Iowa	6
Chris Klieman	North Dakota State	5
John Stiegelmeier	South Dakota State	3
Craig Bohl	North Dakota State	3
Darrell Mudra	Northern Iowa	2
Jesse Branch	Missouri State	2
Randy Ball	Western Illinois	2
Don Patterson	Western Illinois	2
Jerry Kill	Southern Illinois	2
Jon Heacock	Youngstown State	2
Dale Lennon	Southern Illinois	2
Matt Entz	North Dakota State	2
Brock Spack	Illinois State	2
Jimmy Rogers	South Dakota State	2
Tim Polasek	North Dakota State	2
Al Molde	Eastern Illinois	1
Bruce Craddock	Western Illinois	1
Bob Spoo	Eastern Illinois	1
Dan Jackson	South Dakota State	1
Todd Berry	Illinois State	1
Jack Harbaugh	Western Kentucky	1
Bobby Petrino	Missouri State	1
Bubba Schweigert	North Dakota	1
Bob Nielson	South Dakota	1
