= Zach Lujan =

American football coach (born c.1995)

Current position
- Title: Wide receivers coach
- Team: New Mexico
- Conference: Mountain West

Biographical details
- Born: c. 1995 (age 30–31)

Playing career
- 2013: Chabot College
- 2014–2016: South Dakota State
- Position: Quarterback

Coaching career (HC unless noted)
- 2017: South Dakota State (OQC)
- 2018: South Dakota State (RB)
- 2019–2021: South Dakota State (QB)
- 2022–2023: South Dakota State (OC/QB)
- 2024–2025: Northwestern (OC/QB)
- 2026–present: New Mexico (WR/AHC)

Zach Lujan is an American football coach and former player who is the wide receivers coach for the New Mexico Lobos football team.

== Playing career ==
Lujan grew up in Anchorage, Alaska and attended South Anchorage High School. He was a three-time All-State selection at quarterback and passed 1,368 yards during his senior season as South Anchorage won the Alaskan state championship. Lujan began his college football career at Chabot College in Hayward, California. He was named the Golden Gate Conference Offensive Player of the Year as a freshman after completing 139-of-235 pass attempts for 1,820 yards and 15 touchdowns with four interceptions. After the season, Lujan transferred to South Dakota State.

Lujan began his first season with the South Dakota State Jackrabbits as the backup to starter Austin Sumner and filled in after Sumner suffered an injury in the season opener. He played in nine total games with seven starts and completed 147-of-241 pass attempts for 1,943 yards with 13 touchdowns and 10 interceptions and was named to the Missouri Valley Football Conference (MVFC) All-Newcomer Team. Lujan entered his junior season as the Jackrabbits starting quarterback before suffering an injury and ultimately losing the job to Taryn Christion. He finished the season with 1,861 passing yards and 14 touchdown passes with six interceptions. Lujan spent his senior season as the backup to Christion and served as a team captain.

== Coaching career ==
Lujan was hired to SDSU's coaching staff as an offensive quality control assistant after graduating in 2017. He was promoted to running backs coach the following season. Lujan served as running backs coach for one year before being made the Jackrabbits' quarterbacks coach before the start of the 2019 season. He was promoted to offensive coordinator in 2022, while maintaining his position as quarterbacks coach, after previous coordinator Jason Eck was hired as the head coach at University of Idaho. The Jackrabbits advanced to the 2023 NCAA Division I Football Championship Game in Lujan's first season as coordinator and beat North Dakota State 45-21 for the school's first national championship. SDSU averaged 34.2 points per game and 348.6 yards per game on the season. In 2023, the Jackrabbits scored 37.3 points per game and repeated as national champions while quarterback Mark Gronowski won the Walter Payton Award as the best offensive player in FCS.

After the 2023 season, Lujan was hired to be the offensive coordinator and quarterbacks coach at Northwestern. Lujan's contract was not renewed after two seasons with the Wildcats.

Lujan was hired as the wide receivers coach at New Mexico on January 11, 2026.
