= 2022 South Dakota State Jackrabbits football team =

American college football season

2022 South Dakota State Jackrabbits football

NCAA Division I champion MVFC champion

NCAA Division I Championship Game, W 45–21 vs. North Dakota State
- Conference: Missouri Valley Football Conference

Ranking
- STATS: No. 1
- FCS Coaches: No. 1
- Record: 14–1 (8–0 MVFC)
- Head coach: John Stiegelmeier (26th season)
- Offensive coordinator: Zach Lujan (1st season)
- Offensive scheme: Pro-style
- Defensive coordinator: Jimmy Rogers (4th season)
- Base defense: 3–4
- Home stadium: Dana J. Dykhouse Stadium

2022 Missouri Valley Football Conference standings
	Conf.			Overall
Team	W		L	W		L
No. 1 South Dakota State $^	8	–	0	14	–	1
No. 2 North Dakota State ^	7	–	1	12	–	3
No. 20 North Dakota ^	5	–	3	7	–	5
Youngstown State	5	–	3	7	–	4
Northern Iowa	5	–	3	6	–	5
Illinois State	4	–	4	6	–	5
Southern Illinois	4	–	4	5	–	6
Missouri State	3	–	5	5	–	6
South Dakota	2	–	6	3	–	8
Indiana State	1	–	7	2	–	9
Western Illinois	0	–	8	0	–	11
$ – Conference champion; ^ – FCS playoff participant; Rankings from STATS Poll

The 2022 South Dakota State Jackrabbits football team represented South Dakota State University as a member of the Missouri Valley Football Conference (MVFC) during the 2022 NCAA Division I FCS football season. Led John Stiegelmeier in his 26th and final season as head coach, the Jackrabbits compiled an overall record of 14–1 with a mark of 8–0 in conference play, winning the MVFC title. South Dakota State received the MVFC's automatic bid to the NCAA Division I Football Championship playoffs, where after a first-round bye, the Jackrabbits defeated Delaware in the second round, Holy Cross in the quarterfinals, Montana State in the semifinals, and fellow MVFC member North Dakota State in the NCAA Division I Football Championship Game to win program's first national title. The team played home games on campus at Dana J. Dykhouse Stadium in Brookings, South Dakota.

== Schedule ==
Date	Time	Opponent	Rank	Site	TV	Result	Attendance
September 3	11:00 a.m.	at Iowa*	No. 2	Kinnick Stadium; Iowa City, IA	FS1	L 3–7	69,250
September 10	6:00 p.m.	UC Davis*	No. 2	Dana J. Dykhouse Stadium; Brookings, SD	MidcoSN/ESPN+	W 24–22	15,182
September 17	6:00 p.m.	Butler*	No. 2	Dana J. Dykhouse Stadium; Brookings, SD	MidcoSN	W 45–17	16,414
September 24	2:00 p.m.	at No. 6 Missouri State	No. T–2	Robert W. Plaster Stadium; Springfield, MO	ESPN3	W 28–14	13,189
October 1	2:00 p.m.	Western Illinois	No. 2	Dana J. Dykhouse Stadium; Brookings, SD	MidcoSN2	W 34–10	15,237
October 8	2:00 p.m.	South Dakota	No. 2	Dana J. Dykhouse Stadium; Brookings, SD (rivalry)	MidcoSN/ESPN+	W 28–3	19,332
October 15	2:30 p.m.	at No. 1 North Dakota State	No. 2	Fargodome; Fargo, ND (Dakota Marker)	MidcoSN/ESPN+	W 23–21	18,603
October 22	3:00 p.m.	at No. 20 North Dakota	No. 1	Alerus Center; Grand Forks, ND	MidcoSN+/ESPN+	W 49–35	11,067
October 29	2:00 p.m.	Indiana State	No. 1	Dana J. Dykhouse Stadium; Brookings, SD	MidcoSN/ESPN+	W 49–7	19,041
November 5	4:00 p.m.	at Northern Iowa	No. 1	UNI-Dome; Cedar Falls, IA	MidcoSN2/ESPN+	W 31–28	9,449
November 12	2:00 p.m.	Illinois State	No. 1	Dana J. Dykhouse Stadium; Brookings, SD	MidcoSN2/ESPN+	W 31–7	8,160
December 3	3:00 p.m.	No. 23 Delaware*	No. 1	Dana J. Dykhouse Stadium; Brookings, SD (NCAA Division I Second Round)	ESPN+	W 42–6	6,117
December 10	11:00 a.m.	No. 7 Holy Cross*	No. 1	Dana J. Dykhouse Stadium; Brookings, SD (NCAA Division I Quarterfinal)	ESPN/ESPN+	W 42–21	6,549
December 17	3:00 p.m.	No. 3 Montana State*	No. 1	Dana J. Dykhouse Stadium; Brookings, SD (NCAA Division I Semifinal)	ESPN2/ESPN+	W 39–18	7,195
January 8, 2023	1:00 p.m.	vs. No. 4 North Dakota State	No. 1	Toyota Stadium; Frisco, TX (NCAA Division I Championship Game)	ABC/ESPN+	W 45–21	18,023
*Non-conference game; Rankings from STATS Poll released prior to the game; All times are in Central time

== Roster ==
2022 South Dakota State Jackrabbits football team roster
Players
Coaches
Offense

Pos.	#	Name	Class
QB	17	Jeff Becker	Fr
QB	16	Jon Bell	Fr
QB	11	Mark Gronowski	So
QB	13	Keaton Heide	Sr
QB	7	Chase Mason	Fr
QB	2	Rudy Voss	So
RB	28	Josh Buri	Fr
RB	22	Isaiah Davis	Jr
RB	33	Justin Harris	Fr
RB	21	Angel Johnson	Fr
RB	24	Derrick Johnson	Fr
RB	3	Amar Johnson	So
RB	39	Isaac Kracl	Fr
FB/TE	34	Michael Morgan	Sr
TE	83	David Alpers	Fr
TE	12	Regan Bollweg	Fr
TE	88	Greyton Gannon	Fr
TE	89	Brody Gormley	Fr
TE	87	Zach Heins	Sr
TE	85	Tucker Kraft	Jr
TE	91	Hayden Muirhead	Fr
TE	80	Nate Sullivan Jr.	So
OL	66	Brady Beck	Jr
OL	61	Evan Beerntsen	Jr
OL	79	Jharett Bloomenrader	Jr
OL	62	Derrick Brown	Fr
OL	70	Colby Christensen	So
OL	69	Quinten Christensen	Fr
OL	76	Bo Donald	Jr
OL	74	Garret Greenfield	Sr
OL	71	J. T. Gulbraa	Fr
OL	54	Jalen Lee	So
OL	67	Brennan Leines	Fr
OL	60	Mason McCormick	Sr
OL	50	Gus Miller	So
OL	78	John O'Brian	Jr
OL	77	Michael Reed	Fr
OL	75	Dawson Rudd	Fr
OL	64	Ethan Vibert	Jr
WR	4	Canyon Bauer	Jr
WR	15	Devon Cole Jr.	So
WR	19	A. J. Coons	So
WR	8	Tyler Feldkamp	So
WR	81	Rhett Foster	Fr
WR	18	Grahm Goering	Fr
WR	82	Jason Harris	Fr
WR	86	Patrick Hoffmann	So
WR	1	Jadon Janke	Sr
WR	10	Jaxon Janke	Sr
WR	84	Daxon Lindholm	Fr
WR	36	Dane Miller	Fr
WR	5	Landon Wolf	Sr

Defense

Pos.	#	Name	Class
LB	32	Adam Bock	Jr
LB	47	Michael Drotzmann	Jr
LB	9	Caleb Francl	Jr
LB	47	Kytan Fyfe	Fr
LB	11	Jason Freeman	Jr
LB	49	Bryce Johnson	Fr
LB	45	Kaden Johnson	Fr
LB	40	Aaron Kusler	So
LB	43	Adam Kusler	So
LB	0	Daeton Mcgaughy	Jr
LB	46	Cullen McShane	Fr
LB	41	Joe Ollman	Fr
LB	38	Trevor Scott	Fr
LB	30	Payton Shafer	Sr
LB	29	Graham Spalding	Jr
LB	2	Isaiah Stalbird	Sr
LB	42	Davion Sterner	So
LB	6	Saiveon Williamson	Sr
DE	44	Kevin Brenner	Jr
DE	48	Quinton Hicks	Sr
DE	53	Caden Johnson	Jr
DE	50	Noah Jessup	Fr
DE	90	Randy Keumogne	Jr
DE	58	Aidan Murphy	Fr
DE	94	Cade Terveer	Sr
DE	95	Zac Wilson	Jr
DE	97	Reece Winkelman	Sr
DT	93	Max Baloun	So
DT	59	Grant Conaway	Jr
DT	52	Jarod DePriest	Jr
DT	51	Logan Green	Fr
DT	99	Caleb Sanders	Sr
DT	91	Jace Sifore	Fr
DT	98	Ryan Van Marel	Sr
DT	57	Levi Vanden Bos	Fr
DT	92	Brian Williams	Jr
DT	55	Aaron Wolfcale-Holsten	Fr
CB	26	Steven Arrell	So
CB	7	Dalys Beanum	Jr
CB	15	Timothy Croskey	Fr
CB	13	Aydan Dautermann	Fr
CB	5	DyShawn Gales	Sr
CB	17	Abe Hoskins III	So
CB	31	Jalen B. Lee	Fr
CB	1	Malik Lofton	Sr
CB	20	Myles Taylor	Fr
S	23	Matthew Durrance	Fr
S	14	Colby Huerter	So
S	3	Dontay Johnson	Fr
S	37	Tucker Large	Fr
S	35	Chase Norblade	Sr
S	19	Max Polischuk	Fr
S	25	Cale Reeder	Jr
S	34	Ryan Swoger	Fr
S	27	Noah Thompson	Fr

Special teams

Pos.	#	Name	Class
PK	96	Zach Brummels	Fr
PK/P	10	Hunter Dustman	Jr
PK/P	97	Luke Fenton	Fr
PK	99	Jack Green	Fr
LS	48	Jaden Mueller	So

Head coach

- John Stiegelmeier

Coordinators/assistant coaches

- Jimmy Rogers – Assistant head coach/defensive coordinator/linebackers
- Zach Lujan – Offensive coordinator/quarterbacks
- Rob Erickson – Special teams coordinator/cornerbacks
- Josh Davis – Passing game coordinator/wide receivers
- Ryan Olson – Run game coordinator/offensive line
- Christian Smith – Defensive run game coordinator/defensive line
- Andre Crenshaw – Running backs
- Chris Meyers – Tight ends
- Jesse Bobbit – Recruiting coordinator/safeties
- Mark Kubacki – Assistant defensive line
- Jonathan Shaeffer – Director of Football Operations
- Chuck Case – Graduate assistant – offense
- Matt Jacobs – Director of strength & conditioning
- Sean Hupke – Video coordinator
- Evan Traxler – Graduate assistant – defense

Legend

- (C) Team captain
- (S) Suspended
- (I) Ineligible
- Injured
- Redshirt

Roster

== Ranking movements ==
Ranking movements Legend: ██ Increase in ranking ██ Decrease in ranking т = Tied with team above or below ( ) = First-place votes
	Week													
Poll	Pre	1	2	3	4	5	6	7	8	9	10	11	12	Final
STATS FCS	2 (2)	2 (2)	2 (2)	2 т (5)	2 (3)	2 (3)	2 (7)	1 (51)	1 (51)	1 (53)	1 (48)	1 (47)	1 (45)	1 (54)
Coaches	3 (1)	3 (1)	3	3	3	3	3	1 (26)	1 (25)	1 (25)	1 (21)	1 (23)	1 (24)	1 (26)

== Game summaries ==
=== At Iowa ===
No. 2 South Dakota State at Iowa

Team	1	2	3	4	Total
No. 2 Jackrabbits	0	3	0	0	3
• Hawkeyes	3	0	2	2	7

- Date: September 3
- Location:
  Kinnick Stadium
  Iowa City, IA
- Game start: 11:05 a.m. CDT
- Elapsed time: 3:32
- Game attendance: 69,250
- Game weather: 77 °F (25 °C), Cloudy, Wind NW 6 mph (9.7 km/h)
- Referee: Michael Cannon
- TV announcers (FS1): Noah Eagle (play-by-play), Mark Helfrich (analyst)
- Source: Box Score

Scoring summary
1	1:11	Iowa	Aaron Blom 46-yard field goal	Iowa 3–0
2	0:20	SDSU	Hunter Dustman 44-yard field goal	Tied 3–3
3	4:09	Iowa	Safety, Isaiah Davis run for -1 yard	Iowa 5–3
4	4:04	Iowa	Safety, Mark Gronowski sacked in end zone by Joe Evans	Iowa 7–3

Statistics	SDST	IOWA
First downs	6	10
Total yards	120	166
Rushing yards	33	57
Passing yards	87	109
Turnovers	0	2
Time of possession	29:44	30:11

Team	Category	Player	Statistics
South Dakota State	Passing	Mark Gronowski	10/26, 87 yards
South Dakota State	Rushing	Isaiah Davis	18 rushes, 50 yards
South Dakota State	Receiving	Isaiah Davis	5 receptions, 32 yards
Iowa	Passing	Spencer Petras	11/25, 109 yards, INT
Iowa	Rushing	Leshon Williams	24 rushes, 72 yards
Iowa	Receiving	Arland Bruce IV	5 receptions, 68 yards

=== UC Davis ===
UC Davis at No. 2 South Dakota State

Team	1	2	3	4	Total
Aggies	0	10	0	12	22
• No. 2 Jackrabbits	7	10	0	7	24

- Date: September 10
- Location:
  Dana J. Dykhouse Stadium
  Brookings, SD
- Game start: 6:05 p.m. CDT
- Elapsed time: 3:09
- Game attendance: 15,182
- Game weather: 71 °F (22 °C), Sunny, Wind NW 10 mph (16 km/h)
- Referee: Aaron Adams
- Television network: MidcoSN/ESPN+
- Source: Box Score

Scoring summary
1	8:45	SDSU	Mark Gronowski 1-yard run (Hunter Dustman kick)	SDSU 7–0
2	10:53	SDSU	Hunter Dustman 41-yard field goal	SDSU 10–0
2	9:33	UCD	Lan Larison 68-yard pass from Miles Hastings (Isaiah Gomez kick)	SDSU 10–7
2	4:08	SDSU	Mark Gronowski 5-yard run (Hunter Dustman kick)	SDSU 17–7
2	0:01	UCD	Isaiah Gomez 36-yard field goal	SDSU 17–10
4	9:04	SDSU	Tyler Feldkamp 7-yard pass from Mark Gronowski	SDSU 24–10
4	3:21	UCD	Justin Poerio 9-yard pass from Miles Hastings (conversion failed)	SDSU 24–16
4	2:03	UCD	McCallan Castles 25-yard pass from Miles Hastings (conversion failed)	SDSU 24–22

Statistics	UCD	SDSU
First downs	17	18
Total yards	322	250
Rushing yards	49	140
Passing yards	273	110
Turnovers	1	2
Time of possession	26:09	33:51

Team	Category	Player	Statistics
UC Davis	Passing	Miles Hastings	26/43, 273 yards, 3 TD, INT
UC Davis	Rushing	Ulonzo Gilliam	11 rushes, 33 yards
UC Davis	Receiving	Ulonzo Gilliam	8 receptions, 80 yards
South Dakota State	Passing	Mark Gronowski	13/21, 110 yards, TD, 2 INT
South Dakota State	Rushing	Isaiah Davis	25 rushes, 112 yards
South Dakota State	Receiving	Jaxon Janke	3 receptions, 36 yards

=== Butler ===
Butler at No. 2 South Dakota State

Team	1	2	3	4	Total
Bulldogs	7	0	0	10	17
• No. 2 Jackrabbits	14	14	3	14	45

- Date: September 17
- Location:
  Dana J. Dykhouse Stadium
  Brookings, SD
- Game start: 6:05 p.m. CDT
- Elapsed time: 3:02
- Game attendance: 16,414
- Game weather: 81 °F (27 °C), Sunny, Wind SW 15 mph (24 km/h)
- Referee: Rick Warne
- Television network: MidcoSN
- Source: Box Score

Scoring summary
1	11:06	SDSU	Mark Gronowski 1-yard run (Hunter Dustman kick)	SDSU 7–0
1	7:49	Butler	Luke Wooten 56-yard pass from Bret Bushka (Luka Zurak kick)	Tied 7–7
1	5:02	SDSU	Jaxon Janke 7-yard pass from Mark Gronowski (Hunter Dustman kick)	SDSU 14–7
2	12:08	SDSU	Jadon Janke 17-yard pass from Mark Gronowski (Hunter Dustman kick)	SDSU 21–7
2	1:03	SDSU	Zach Heins 28-yard pass from Mark Gronowski (Hunter Dustman kick)	SDSU 28–7
3	6:34	SDSU	Hunter Dustman 27-yard field goal	SDSU 31–7
4	14:55	SDSU	Angel Johnson 2-yard run (Jack Green kick)	SDSU 38–7
4	11:30	SDSU	Rudy Voss 2-yard run (Jack Green kick)	SDSU 45–7
4	5:38	Butler	Luka Zurak 33-yard field goal	SDSU 45–10
4	1:56	Butler	Bret Bushka 2-yard run (Luka Zurak kick)	SDSU 45–17

Statistics	BUT	SDSU
First downs	13	25
Total yards	264	463
Rushing yards	53	184
Passing yards	211	279
Turnovers	1	0
Time of possession	27:49	32:11

Team	Category	Player	Statistics
Butler	Passing	Bret Bushka	18/31, 211 yards, TD, INT
Butler	Rushing	Bret Bushka	9 carries, 29 yards, TD
Butler	Receiving	Luke Wooten	4 receptions, 79 yards, TD
South Dakota State	Passing	Mark Gronowski	17/25, 279 yards, 3 TD
South Dakota State	Rushing	Isaiah Davis	11 carries, 74 yards
South Dakota State	Receiving	Jadon Janke	5 receptions, 87 yards, TD

=== At No. 6 Missouri State ===
No. 2 South Dakota State at No. 6 Missouri State

Team	1	2	3	4	Total
• No. 2 Jackrabbits	7	0	7	14	28
No. 6 Bears	0	0	14	0	14

- Date: September 24
- Location:
  Robert W. Plaster Stadium
  Springfield, MO
- Game start: 2:03 p.m. CDT
- Elapsed time: 3:09
- Game attendance: 13,189
- Game weather: 90 °F (32 °C), Sunny, Wind W 7 mph (11 km/h)
- Referee: Andrew Speciale
- Television network: ESPN3
- Source: Box Score

Scoring summary
1	2:25	SDSU	Jadon Janke 3-yard pass from Mark Gronowski (Hunter Dustman kick)	SDSU 7–0
3	10:00	SDSU	Jaxon Janke 13-yard pass from Mark Gronowski (Hunter Dustman kick)	SDSU 14–0
3	6:34	MSU	Jacardia Wright 15-yard run (Jose Pizano kick)	SDSU 14–7
3	2:55	MSU	Raylen Sharpe 67-yard pass from Jason Shelley (Jose Pizano kick)	Tied 14–14
4	7:59	SDSU	Zach Heins 21-yard pass from Mark Gronowski (Hunter Dustman kick)	SDSU 21–14
4	2:30	SDSU	Jaxon Janke 40-yard pass from Mark Gronowski (Hunter Dustman kick)	SDSU 28–14

Statistics	SDSU	MSU
First downs	25	13
Total yards	475	258
Rushing yards	156	73
Passing yards	319	185
Turnovers	1	2
Time of possession	34:55	25:05

Team	Category	Player	Statistics
South Dakota State	Passing	Mark Gronowski	22/29, 319 yards, 4 TD
South Dakota State	Rushing	Isaiah Davis	20 rushes, 83 yards
South Dakota State	Receiving	Zach Heins	7 receptions, 127 yards, TD
Missouri State	Passing	Jason Shelley	19/29, 185 yards, TD, 2 INT
Missouri State	Rushing	Jacardia Wright	13 rushes, 63 yards, TD
Missouri State	Receiving	Raylen Sharpe	1 receptions, 67 yards, TD

=== Western Illinois ===
Western Illinois at No. 2 South Dakota State

Team	1	2	3	4	Total
Leathernecks	0	3	0	7	10
• No. 2 Jackrabbits	10	7	3	14	34

- Date: October 1
- Location:
  Dana J. Dykhouse Stadium
  Brookings, SD
- Game start: 2:05 p.m. CDT
- Elapsed time: 3:13
- Game attendance: 15,237
- Game weather: 74 °F (23 °C), Sunny, Wind SE 17 mph (27 km/h)
- Referee: Aaron Adams
- Television network: MidcoSN2
- Source: Box Score

Scoring summary
1	10:17	USD	Isaiah Davis 1-yard run (Hunter Dustman kick)	SDSU 7–0
1	0:57	SDSU	Hunter Dustman 27-yard field goal	SDSU 10–0
2	11:51	WIU	Mason Laramie 35-yard field goal	SDSU 10–3
2	4:11	SDSU	Mark Gronowski 11-yard run (Hunter Dustman kick)	SDSU 17–3
3	10:26	SDSU	Hunter Dustman 25-yard field goal	SDSU 20–3
4	11:41	SDSU	Jaxon Janke 19-yard pass from Mark Gronowski (Hunter Dustman kick)	SDSU 27–3
4	7:27	SDSU	Isaiah Davis 12-yard run (Hunter Dustman kick)	SDSU 34–3
4	5:54	WIU	Jay Parker pass from Henry Ogala (Mason Laramie kick)	SDSU 34–10

Statistics	WIU	SDSU
First downs	11	28
Total yards	220	458
Rushing yards	19	270
Passing yards	201	188
Turnovers	1	0
Time of possession	18:34	41:26

Team	Category	Player	Statistics
Western Illinois	Passing	Clay Bruno	10/20, 129 yards, INT
Western Illinois	Rushing	Jaylen Reed	8 rushes, 22 yards
Western Illinois	Receiving	Naseim Brantley	4 receptions, 107 yards
South Dakota State	Passing	Mark Gronowski	17/33, 188 yards, TD
South Dakota State	Rushing	Isaiah Davis	27 rushes, 199 yards, 2 TD
South Dakota State	Receiving	Jaxon Janke	9 receptions, 94 yards, TD

=== South Dakota ===
South Dakota at No. 2 South Dakota State

Team	1	2	3	4	Total
Coyotes	3	0	0	0	3
• No. 2 Jackrabbits	0	14	7	7	28

- Date: October 8
- Location:
  Dana J. Dykhouse Stadium
  Brookings, SD
- Game start: 2:05 p.m. CDT
- Elapsed time: 2:56
- Game attendance: 19,332
- Game weather: 59 °F (15 °C), Sunny, Wind W 13 mph (21 km/h)
- Referee: Marcel Kerr
- Television network: MidcoSN/ESPN+
- Source: Box Score

Scoring summary
1	11:18	USD	Eddie Ogamba 37-yard field goal	USD 3–0
2	9:29	SDSU	Jaxon Janke 28-yard pass from Mark Gronowski (Hunter Dustman kick)	SDSU 7–3
2	2:43	SDSU	Isaiah Davis 47-yard run (Hunter Dustman kick)	SDSU 14–3
3	10:26	SDSU	Isaiah Davis 5-yard run (Hunter Dustman kick)	SDSU 21–3
4	14:21	SDSU	Isaiah Davis 1-yard run (Hunter Dustman kick)	SDSU 28–3

Statistics	USD	SDSU
First downs	6	22
Total yards	136	344
Rushing yards	92	208
Passing yards	44	136
Turnovers	2	1
Time of possession	26:09	33:51

Team	Category	Player	Statistics
South Dakota	Passing	Carson Camp	5/12, 44 yards, 2 INT
South Dakota	Rushing	Travis Theis	13 rushes, 73 yards
South Dakota	Receiving	Javion Phelps	1 reception, 17 yards
South Dakota State	Passing	Mark Gronowski	12/20, 136 yards, TD, INT
South Dakota State	Rushing	Isaiah Davis	15 rushes, 108 yards, 3 TD
South Dakota State	Receiving	Jaxon Janke	4 receptions, 76 yards, TD

=== At No. 1 North Dakota State ===
No. 2 South Dakota State at No. 1 North Dakota State

Team	1	2	3	4	Total
• No. 2 Jackrabbits	7	0	10	6	23
No. 1 Bison	14	7	0	0	21

- Date: October 15
- Location:
  Fargodome
  Fargo, ND
- Game start: 5:20 p.m. CDT
- Elapsed time: 2:45
- Game attendance: 18,603
- Game weather: 70 °F (21 °C), Indoor
- Referee: Rick Warne
- Television network: MidcoSN/ESPN+
- Source: Box Score

Scoring summary
1	11:07	NDSU	DJ Hart 22-yard pass from Cam Miller (Griffin Crosa kick)	NDSU 7–0
1	4:21	SDSU	Isaiah Davis 24-yard run (Hunter Dustman kick)	Tied 7–7
1	3:02	NDSU	Cam Miller 6-yard run (Griffin Crosa kick)	NDSU 14–7
2	11:08	NDSU	Hunter Luepke 30-yard pass from Cam Miller (Griffin Crosa kick)	NDSU 21–7
3	10:47	SDSU	Hunter Dustman 31-yard field goal	NDSU 21–10
3	3:03	SDSU	Amar Johnson 16-yard run (Hunter Dustman kick)	NDSU 21–17
4	10:25	SDSU	Hunter Dustman 38-yard field goal	NDSU 21–20
4	3:49	SDSU	Hunter Dustman 18-yard field goal	SDSU 23–21

Statistics	SDSU	NDSU
First downs	18	17
Total yards	359	354
Rushing yards	207	127
Passing yards	152	227
Turnovers	0	1
Time of possession	34:35	25:25

Team	Category	Player	Statistics
South Dakota State	Passing	Mark Gronowski	16/21, 152 yards
South Dakota State	Rushing	Isaiah Davis	14 rushes, 114 yards
South Dakota State	Receiving	Jadon Janke	7 receptions, 83 yards
North Dakota State	Passing	Cam Miller	17/22, 227 yards, 2 TD
North Dakota State	Rushing	Hunter Luepke	15 rushes, 58 yards
North Dakota State	Receiving	DJ Hart	4 receptions, 59 yards

=== At No. 20 North Dakota ===
No. 1 South Dakota State at No. 20 North Dakota

Team	1	2	3	4	Total
• No. 1 Jackrabbits	7	7	21	14	49
No. 20 Fighting Hawks	14	7	0	14	35

- Date: October 22
- Location:
  Alerus Center
  Grand Forks, ND
- Game start: 3:06 p.m. CDT
- Elapsed time: 3:42
- Game attendance: 11,067
- Game weather: 70 °F (21 °C), Indoor
- Referee: Jason Perkins
- Television network: MidcoSN/ESPN+
- Source: Box Score

Scoring summary
1	12:20	UND	Bo Belquist 10-yard pass from Tommy Schuster (Brady Stevens kick)	UND 7–0
1	8:06	UND	Quincy Vaughn 1-yard run (Brady Stevens kick)	UND 14–0
1	4:20	SDSU	DyShawn Gales 31-yard interception (Hunter Dustman kick)	UND 14–7
2	5:28	UND	Tyler Hoosman 2-yard run (Brady Stevens kick)	UND 21–7
2	1:55	SDSU	Tucker Kraft 32-yard pass from Mark Gronowski (Hunter Dustman kick)	UND 21–14
3	11:48	SDSU	Jaxon Janke 10-yard pass from Mark Gronowski (Hunter Dustman kick)	Tied 21–21
3	7:11	SDSU	Zach Heins 2-yard pass from Mark Gronowski (Hunter Dustman kick)	SDSU 28–21
3	6:42	SDSU	Mark Gronowski 1-yard run (Hunter Dustman kick)	SDSU 35–21
4	10:32	SDSU	Mark Gronowski 10-yard run (Hunter Dustman kick)	SDSU 42–21
4	6:44	UND	Tommy Schuster 9-yard run (Brady Stevens kick)	SDSU 42–28
4	6:14	SDSU	Amar Johnson 1-yard run (Hunter Dustman kick)	SDSU 49–28
4	1:10	UND	Ma Vaughn-Jones 11-yard punt return (Brady Stevens kick)	SDSU 49–35

Statistics	SDSU	UND
First downs	13	23
Total yards	308	365
Rushing yards	95	74
Passing yards	213	291
Turnovers	0	3
Time of possession	23:38	36:22

Team	Category	Player	Statistics
South Dakota State	Passing	Mark Gronowski	15/20, 197 yards, 3 TD
South Dakota State	Rushing	Amar Johnson	14 rushes, 71 yards, TD
South Dakota State	Receiving	Jadon Janke	5 receptions, 86 yards
North Dakota	Passing	Tommy Schuster	27/39, 291 yards, TD, 2 INT
North Dakota	Rushing	Tyler Hoosman	15 rushes, 44 yards, TD
North Dakota	Receiving	Bo Belquist	6 receptions, 82 yards, TD

=== Indiana State ===
Indiana State at No. 1 South Dakota State

Team	1	2	3	4	Total
Sycamores	0	7	0	0	7
• No. 1 Jackrabbits	14	21	14	0	49

- Date: October 29
- Location:
  Dana J. Dykhouse Stadium
  Brookings, SD
- Game start: 2:06 p.m. CDT
- Elapsed time: 3:17
- Game attendance: 19,041
- Game weather: 64 °F (18 °C), Sunny, Wind S 20 mph (32 km/h)
- Referee: Jason Berg
- Television network: MidcoSN/ESPN+
- Source: Box Score

Statistics	ISU	SDSU
First downs	15	24
Total yards	260	409
Rushing yards	106	162
Passing yards	154	247
Turnovers	1	0
Time of possession	29:18	30:42

Team	Category	Player	Statistics
Indiana State	Passing	Cade Chambers	11/24, 114 yards, TD, INT
Indiana State	Rushing	Justin Dinka	16 carries, 52 yards
Indiana State	Receiving	Dante Hendrix	4 receptions, 41 yards
South Dakota State	Passing	Mark Gronowski	22/28, 233 yards, 3 TD
South Dakota State	Rushing	Amar Johnson	10 carries, 75 yards, TD
South Dakota State	Receiving	Jaxon Janke	5 receptions, 82 yards

=== At Northern Iowa ===
No. 1 South Dakota State at Northern Iowa

Team	1	2	3	4	Total
• No. 1 Jackrabbits	3	17	8	3	31
Panthers	0	14	7	7	28

- Date: November 5
- Location:
  UNI-Dome
  Cedar Falls, IA
- Game start: 4:06 p.m. CDT
- Elapsed time: 3:29
- Game attendance: 18,603
- Game weather: 72 °F (22 °C), Indoor
- Referee: Marcel Keer
- Television network: MidcoSN/ESPN+
- Source: Box Score

Statistics	SDSU	UNI
First downs	22	19
Total yards	427	358
Rushing yards	164	88
Passing yards	263	270
Turnovers	1	2
Time of possession	33:36	26:24

Team	Category	Player	Statistics
South Dakota State	Passing	Mark Gronowski	21/34, 263 yards, TD, INT
South Dakota State	Rushing	Isaiah Davis	24 rushes, 105 yards, TD
South Dakota State	Receiving	Tucker Kraft	4 receptions, 69 yards
Northern Iowa	Passing	Theo Day	16/30, 270 yards, 2 TD, 2 INT
Northern Iowa	Rushing	Vance McShane	8 rushes, 62 yards, TD
Northern Iowa	Receiving	Sam Schnee	4 receptions, 69 yards

=== Illinois State ===
Illinois State at No. 1 South Dakota State

Team	1	2	3	4	Total
Redbirds	7	0	0	0	7
• No. 1 Jackrabbits	0	13	15	3	31

- Date: November 12
- Location:
  Dana J. Dykhouse Stadium
  Brookings, SD
- Game start: 2:05 p.m. CST
- Elapsed time: 2:42
- Game attendance: 8,160
- Game weather: 21 °F (−6 °C), Cloudy, Wind NW 11 mph (18 km/h)
- Referee: Aaron Adams
- Television network: MidcoSN/ESPN+
- Source: Box Score

Statistics	ISU	SDSU
First downs	7	23
Total yards	100	431
Rushing yards	45	148
Passing yards	55	283
Turnovers	1	1
Time of possession	20:26	39:34

Team	Category	Player	Statistics
Illinois State	Passing	Tommy Rittenhouse	9/20, 55 yards, INT
Illinois State	Rushing	Tommy Rittenhouse	9 carries, 18 yards
Illinois State	Receiving	Daniel Sobkowicz	4 receptions, 32 yards
South Dakota State	Passing	Mark Gronowski	20/28, 283 yards, TD, INT
South Dakota State	Rushing	Isaiah Davis	16 carries, 50 yards, TD
South Dakota State	Receiving	Jadon Janke	5 receptions, 129 yards

=== No. 23 Delaware (second round) ===
No. 23 Delaware at No. 1 South Dakota State

Team	1	2	3	4	Total
No. 23 Fightin' Blue Hens	3	3	0	0	6
• No. 1 Jackrabbits	7	14	21	0	42

- Date: December 3
- Location:
  Dana J. Dykhouse Stadium
  Brookings, SD
- Game start: 2:02 p.m. CST
- Elapsed time: 2:56
- Game attendance: 6,117
- Game weather: 19 °F (−7 °C), Sunny, Wind S 13 mph (21 km/h)
- Referee: Kelly Holman
- Television network: ESPN+
- Source: Box Score

Scoring summary
1	8:06	Delaware	Brandon Ratcliffe 27-yard field goal	Delaware 3–0
1	4:55	SDSU	Isaiah Davis 1-yard run (Hunter Dustman kick)	SDSU 7–3
2	12:57	SDSU	Isaiah Davis 1-yard run (Hunter Dustman kick)	SDSU 14–3
2	4:22	SDSU	Mark Gronowski 1-yard run (Isaiah Davis run)	SDSU 21–3
2	0:00	HC	Brandon Ratcliffe 27-yard field goal	SDSU 21–6
3	7:23	SDSU	Amar Johnson 2-yard run (Hunter Dustman kick)	SDSU 28–6
3	5:15	SDSU	Matthew Durrance fumble recovery in end zone (Hunter Dustman kick)	SDSU 35–6
3	0:30	SDSU	Jaxon Janke 4-yard pass from Mark Gronowski (Hunter Dustman kick)	SDSU 42–6

Statistics	DEL	SDSU
First downs	13	16
Total yards	192	353
Rushing yards	64	222
Passing yards	128	131
Turnovers	1	0
Time of possession	31:03	28:57

Team	Category	Player	Statistics
Delaware	Passing	Ryan O'Connor	10/21, 104 yards
Delaware	Rushing	Kyron Cumby	10 carries, 23 yards
Delaware	Receiving	Thyrick Pitts	5 receptions, 57 yards
South Dakota State	Passing	Mark Gronowski	11/15, 131 yards, TD
South Dakota State	Rushing	Isaiah Davis	14 carries, 104 yards, 2 TD
South Dakota State	Receiving	Jadon Janke	3 receptions, 48 yards

=== No. 7 Holy Cross (quarterfinal) ===
No. 7 Holy Cross at No. 1 South Dakota State

Team	1	2	3	4	Total
No. 7 Crusaders	7	7	7	0	21
• No. 1 Jackrabbits	6	15	0	21	42

- Date: December 10
- Location:
  Dana J. Dykhouse Stadium
  Brookings, SD
- Game start: 11:03 a.m. CST
- Elapsed time: 3:05
- Game attendance: 6,549
- Game weather: 31 °F (−1 °C), Cloudy, Wind W 11 mph (18 km/h)
- Referee: Nolan Dumas
- Television network: ESPN
- Source: Box Score

Scoring summary
1	7:15	HC	Matthew Sluka 56-yard run (Derek Ng kick)	HC 7–0
1	3:07	SDSU	Hunter Dustman 29-yard field goal	HC 7–3
1	0:00	SDSU	Hunter Dustman 23-yard field goal	HC 7–6
2	9:10	HC	Sean Morris 27-yard pass from Tyler Purdy (Derek Ng kick)	HC 14–6
2	5:19	SDSU	Isaiah Davis 41-yard run (Isaiah Davis run)	Tied 14–14
2	1:08	SDSU	Jason Freeman 37-yard interception return (Hunter Dustman kick)	SDSU 21–14
3	8:59	HC	Peter Oliver 1-yard run (Derek Ng kick)	Tied 21–21
4	10:08	SDSU	Jaxon Janke 18-yard pass from Mark Gronowski (Hunter Dustman kick)	SDSU 28–21
4	2:39	SDSU	Mark Gronowski 18-yard run (Hunter Dustman kick)	SDSU 35–21
4	0:39	SDSU	Jadon Janke 21-yard pass from Mark Gronowski (Hunter Dustman kick)	SDSU 42–21

Statistics	HC	SDSU
First downs	18	22
Total yards	281	473
Rushing yards	52	281
Passing yards	229	192
Turnovers	0	0
Time of possession	29:00	31:00

Team	Category	Player	Statistics
Holy Cross	Passing	Tommy Mellott	11/18, 174 yards
Holy Cross	Rushing	Isaiah Ifanse	7 carries, 28 yards
Holy Cross	Receiving	Clevan Thomas Jr.	4 receptions, 74 yards
South Dakota State	Passing	Mark Gronowski	10/13, 189 yards, 2 TD
South Dakota State	Rushing	Isaiah Davis	16 carries, 158 yards, TD
South Dakota State	Receiving	Jaxon Janke	3 receptions, 74 yards

=== No. 3 Montana State (semifinal) ===
No. 3 Montana State at No. 1 South Dakota State

Team	1	2	3	4	Total
No. 3 Bobcats	6	3	3	6	18
• No. 1 Jackrabbits	14	14	8	3	39

- Date: December 17
- Location:
  Dana J. Dykhouse Stadium
  Brookings, SD
- Game start: 3:08 p.m. CST
- Elapsed time: 2:54
- Game attendance: 7,195
- Game weather: 9 °F (−13 °C), Sunny, Wind NW 19 mph (31 km/h)
- Referee: Matt Overton
- Television network: ESPN2
- Source: Box Score

Scoring summary
1	12:17	SDSU	Tucker Kraft 36-yard pass from Mark Gronowski (Hunter Dustman kick)	SDSU 7–0
1	6:55	MSU	Sean Chambers 1-yard run (kick failed)	SDSU 7–6
1	0:40	SDSU	Mark Gronowski 1-yard run (Hunter Dustman kick)	SDSU 14–6
2	8:47	SDSU	Isaiah Davis 41-yard run (Hunter Dustman kick)	SDSU 21–6
2	1:03	SDSU	Amar Johnson 38-yard run (Hunter Dustman kick)	SDSU 28–6
2	0:00	MSU	Blake Glessner 37-yard field goal	SDSU 28–9
3	8:39	SDSU	Amar Johnson 5-yard pass from Mark Gronowski (Jadon Janke pass from Mark Gronowski)	SDSU 36–9
3	5:29	MSU	Blake Glessner 36-yard field goal	SDSU 36–12
4	11:41	SDSU	Hunter Dustman 21-yard field goal	SDSU 39–12
4	8:08	MSU	Tommy Mellott 10-yard run (conversion failed)	SDSU 39–18

Statistics	MSU	SDSU
First downs	18	22
Total yards	281	473
Rushing yards	52	281
Passing yards	229	192
Turnovers	0	0
Time of possession	29:00	31:00

Team	Category	Player	Statistics
Montana State	Passing	Tommy Mellott	11/18, 174 yards
Montana State	Rushing	Isaiah Ifanse	7 carries, 28 yards
Montana State	Receiving	Clevan Thomas Jr.	4 receptions, 74 yards
South Dakota State	Passing	Mark Gronowski	10/13, 189 yards, 2 TD
South Dakota State	Rushing	Isaiah Davis	16 carries, 158 yards, TD
South Dakota State	Receiving	Jaxon Janke	3 receptions, 74 yards

=== Vs. No. 4 North Dakota State (championship game) ===
No. 4 North Dakota State vs. No. 1 South Dakota State

Team	1	2	3	4	Total
No. 4 Bison	7	7	0	7	21
• No. 1 Jackrabbits	7	24	7	7	45

- Date: January 8, 2023
- Location:
  Toyota Stadium
  Frisco, TX
- Game start: 1:00 pm CST
- Elapsed time: 3:07
- Game attendance: 18,023
- Game weather: 56 °F (13 °C), Sunny, Wind N 5 mph (8.0 km/h)
- Referee: Jeff Page
- TV announcers (ABC): Roy Philpott, Jay Walker and Paul Carcaterra
- Source: Box Score

Scoring summary
1	9:12	SDSU	Isaiah Davis 16-yard run (Hunter Dustman kick)	SDSU 7–0
1	6:31	NDSU	Joe Stoffel 27-yard pass from Cam Miller (Griffin Crosa kick)	Tied 7–7
2	12:50	SDSU	Amar Johnson 32-yard run (Hunter Dustman kick)	SDSU 14–7
2	11:03	SDSU	Jaxon Janke 18-yard pass from Mark Gronowski (Hunter Dustman kick)	SDSU 21–7
2	3:30	SDSU	Michael Morgan 44-yard pass from Mark Gronowski (Hunter Dustman kick)	SDSU 28–7
2	2:03	NDSU	Eli Green 44-yard pass from Cam Miller (Griffin Crosa kick)	SDSU 28–14
2	0:00	SDSU	Hunter Dustman 30-yard field goal	SDSU 31–14
3	13:13	SDSU	Mark Gronowski 51-yard run (Hunter Dustman kick)	SDSU 38–14
4	13:44	NDSU	Kobe Johnson 9-yard run (Griffin Crosa kick)	SDSU 38–21
4	8:05	SDSU	Jaxon Janke 30-yard pass from Mark Gronowski (Hunter Dustman kick)	SDSU 45–21

Statistics	NDSU	SDSU
First downs	21	22
Total yards	420	506
Rushing yards	160	283
Passing yards	260	223
Turnovers	2	1
Time of possession	28:00	32:00

Team	Category	Player	Statistics
North Dakota State	Passing	Cam Miller	18/29, 260 yards, 2 TD, 2 INT
North Dakota State	Rushing	Cam Miller	13 carries, 64 yards
North Dakota State	Receiving	Zach Mathis	7 receptions, 123 yards
South Dakota State	Passing	Mark Gronowski	14/21, 223 yards, 3 TD
South Dakota State	Rushing	Amar Johnson	9 carries, 126 yards, TD
South Dakota State	Receiving	Jadon Janke	5 receptions, 61 yards

== Players drafted into the NFL ==
Round	Pick	Player	Position	NFL Club
3	78	Tucker Kraft	TE	Green Bay Packers
