= 2022 North Dakota State Bison football team =

American college football season

2022 North Dakota State Bison football

NCAA Division I Football Championship Game, L 21–45 vs. South Dakota State
- Conference: Missouri Valley Football Conference

Ranking
- STATS: No. 2
- FCS Coaches: No. 2
- Record: 12–3 (7–1 MVFC)
- Head coach: Matt Entz (4th season)
- Offensive coordinator: Tyler Roehl (4th season)
- Offensive scheme: Pro-style
- Defensive coordinator: David Braun (4th season)
- Base defense: Multiple 4–3
- Home stadium: Fargodome

2022 Missouri Valley Football Conference standings
	Conf.			Overall
Team	W		L	W		L
No. 1 South Dakota State $^	8	–	0	14	–	1
No. 2 North Dakota State ^	7	–	1	12	–	3
No. 20 North Dakota ^	5	–	3	7	–	5
Youngstown State	5	–	3	7	–	4
Northern Iowa	5	–	3	6	–	5
Illinois State	4	–	4	6	–	5
Southern Illinois	4	–	4	5	–	6
Missouri State	3	–	5	5	–	6
South Dakota	2	–	6	3	–	8
Indiana State	1	–	7	2	–	9
Western Illinois	0	–	8	0	–	11
$ – Conference champion; ^ – FCS playoff participant; Rankings from STATS Poll

The 2022 North Dakota State Bison football team represented North Dakota State University as a member of the Missouri Valley Football Conference (MVFC) during the 2022 NCAA Division I FCS football season. The Bison were led by fourth-year head coach Matt Entz. They played their home games at the Fargodome in Fargo, North Dakota.
The Bison finished their regular season with an overall record of 9–2 and 7–1 in MVFC play. NDSU received the number 3 overall seed in the FCS playoffs. The Bison then beat Montana in the second round, Samford in the quarterfinals, and Incarnate Word in the semifinals, before falling to topseed and archrival South Dakota State in the FCS National Championship. This was the program's first loss in the FCS title game, and only their third ever loss in a title game at any level.

== Schedule ==
Date	Time	Opponent	Rank	Site	TV	Result	Attendance
September 3	2:30 pm	Drake*	No. 1	Fargodome; Fargo, ND	ABC ND/ESPN+	W 56–14	15,951
September 10	2:30 pm	North Carolina A&T*	No. 1	Fargodome; Fargo, ND	ABC ND/ESPN+	W 43–3	16,269
September 17	10:00 pm	at Arizona*	No. 1	Arizona Stadium; Tucson, AZ	FS1	L 28–31	41,211
September 24	1:00 pm	at South Dakota	No. 1	DakotaDome; Vermillion, SD	ABC ND/MidcoSN/ESPN+	W 34–17	6,530
October 1	1:00 pm	Youngstown State	No. 1	Fargodome; Fargo, ND	ABC ND/ESPN+	W 27–14	18,055
October 8	12:00 pm	at Indiana State	No. 1	Memorial Stadium; Terre Haute, IN	ABC ND/ESPN+	W 31–26	4,185
October 15	2:30 pm	No. 2 South Dakota State	No. 1	Fargodome; Fargo, ND (Dakota Marker)	ABC ND/MidcoSN/ESPN+	L 21–23	18,603
October 29	2:30 pm	Illinois State	No. 4	Fargodome; Fargo, ND	ABC ND/ESPN+	W 24–7	16,172
November 5	1:00 pm	at Western Illinois	No. 4	Hanson Field; Macomb, IL	ESPN+	W 56–17	2,534
November 12	1:00 pm	at Southern Illinois	No. 4	Saluki Stadium; Carbondale, IL	ABC ND/ESPN+	W 21–18	4,575
November 19	2:30 pm	No. 16 North Dakota	No. 4	Fargodome; Fargo, ND (Nickel Trophy)	ABC ND/MidcoSN2/ESPN+	W 42–21	18,806
December 3	2:30 pm	No. 19 Montana*	No. 4	Fargodome; Fargo, ND (NCAA Division I Second Round)	ESPN+	W 49–26	12,929
December 9	6:00 pm	No. 8 Samford*	No. 4	Fargodome; Fargo, ND (NCAA Division I Quarterfinal)	ESPN2/ESPN+	W 27–9	11,825
December 16	6:00 pm	No. 5 Incarnate Word*	No. 4	Fargodome; Fargo, ND (NCAA Division I Semifinal)	ESPN2/ESPN+	W 35–32	12,569
January 8	1:00 pm	vs. No. 1 South Dakota State*	No. 4	Toyota Stadium; Frisco, TX (NCAA Division I Championship Game)	ABC	L 21–45	18,023
*Non-conference game; Rankings from STATS Poll released prior to the game; All times are in Central time

== Game summaries ==
=== Regular season ===
==== Drake ====
Drake Bulldogs (0–0) vs North Dakota State Bison (0–0)

Quarter	1	2	3	4	Total
Bulldogs	7	0	7	0	14
No. 1 Bison	14	28	7	7	56

at Fargodome, Fargo, ND

- Date: September 3, 2022
- Game time: 2:30 p.m. (CT)
- Game weather: Indoors; 70 °F (21 °C)
- Game attendance: 15,951
- Referee: TBA
- TV: ESPN+

Statistics	Drake	North Dakota State
First downs	16	20
Plays–yards	69–219	50–386
Rushes–yards	45–104	37–274
Passing yards	115	112
Passing: comp–att–int	14–24–1	8–13–0
Time of possession	34:56	25:04

Team	Category	Player	Statistics
Drake	Passing	Ian Corwin	8/15, 67 yds, 2 TD, INT
Drake	Rushing	Dorian Boyland	15 car, 60 yds
Drake	Receiving	Colin Howard	2 rec, 53 yds
North Dakota State	Passing	Cam Miller	6/9, 105 yds, 2 TD
North Dakota State	Rushing	Kobe Johnson; Hunter Luepke	5 car, 53 yds 3 car, 53 yds, TD
North Dakota State	Receiving	Noah Gindorff	3 rec, 44 yds, TD

Scoring summary

Quarter	Time	Drive			Team	Scoring information	Score	
Quarter	Time	Plays	Yards	TOP	Team	Scoring information	DRAK	NDSU
1st	10:25	9	75	4:28	DRAKE	Dorian Boyland (#0) 1-yard touchdown reception from Ian Corwin (#9), Luke Williams (#26) kick good	7	0
1st	5:08	11	85	5:07	NDSU	Zach Mathis (#0) 31-yard touchdown reception from Cam Miller (#7), Griffin Crosa (#39) kick good	7	7
1st	0:51				NDSU	Blocked Kick returned for a 56-yard TD by Destin Talbert (#2)	7	14
2nd	14:43				NDSU	Punt returned 66 yards for touchdown by Jayden Price (#23), Griffin Crosa (#39) kick good	7	21
2nd	11:30	3	62	1:12	NDSU	Hunter Luepke (#44) 47-yard touchdown run, Griffin Crosa (#39) kick good	7	28
2nd	3:19	2	28	0:43	NDSU	Noah Gindorff (#81) 24-yard touchdown reception from Cam Miller (#7), Griffin Grosa (#39) kick good	7	35
2nd	1:26	4	52	1:35	NDSU	Dominic Gonnella (#29) 13-yard touchdown run, Griffin Crosa (#39) kick good	7	42
3rd	12:04				NDSU	Fumble recovery returned 5 yards for touchdown by Will Mostaert (#91), Griffin Crosa (#39) kick good	7	49
3rd	3:39	15	60	8:19	DRAKE	Tim Nesslage (#87) 2-yard touchdown reception from Ian Corwin (#9), Luke Williams (#26) kick good	14	42
4th	3:56	10	55	5:09	NDSU	Barika Kpeenu (#8) 6-yard touchdown run, Griffin Crosa (#39) kick good	14	56
"TOP" = time of possession. For other American football terms, see Glossary of American football.							14	56

==== North Carolina A&T ====
North Carolina A&T Aggies (0–1) vs North Dakota State Bison (1–0)

Quarter	1	2	3	4	Total
Aggies	3	0	0	0	3
No. 1 Bison	15	21	7	0	43

at Fargodome, Fargo, ND

- Date: September 10, 2022
- Game time: 2:30 p.m. (CT)
- Game weather: Indoors; 70 °F (21 °C)
- Game attendance: 16,269
- Referee: TBA
- TV: ESPN+

Statistics	North Carolina A&T	North Dakota State
First downs	15	15
Plays–yards	63–189	48–273
Rushes–yards	44–139	31–149
Passing yards	50	124
Passing: comp–att–int	11–19–1	11–17–0
Time of possession	35:31	25:29

Team	Category	Player	Statistics
North Carolina A&T	Passing	Jalen Fowler	10/14, 45 yds
North Carolina A&T	Rushing	Bhayshul Tuten	24 car, 127 yds
North Carolina A&T	Receiving	Taymon Cooke	1 rec, 15 yds
North Dakota State	Passing	Cam Miller	7/12, 102 yds, 2 TD
North Dakota State	Rushing	Cole Payton	4 car, 41 yds, TD
North Dakota State	Receiving	Zach Mathis	1 rec, 40 yds, TD

Scoring summary

Quarter	Time	Drive			Team	Scoring information	Score	
Quarter	Time	Plays	Yards	TOP	Team	Scoring information	NCAT	NDSU
1st	13:30	4	52	1:21	NDSU	Zach Mathis (#0) 40-yard touchdown reception from Cam Miller (#7), Griffin Crosa (#39) kick good	0	7
1st	9:48	8	37	3:34	NCAT	38-yard field goal by Andrew Brown (#39)	3	7
1st	6:51	6	54	2:48	NDSU	Cole Payton (#15) 6-yard touchdown run, 2-point run good	3	15
2nd	12:58	5	31	1:54	NDSU	Hunter Luepke (#44) 15-yard touchdown reception from Cam Miller (#7), Griffin Crosa (#39) kick good	3	22
2nd	11:24	1	1	0:03	NDSU	Hunter Luepke (#44) 1-yard touchdown run, Griffin Crosa (#39) kick good	3	29
2nd	3:04	8	78	3:23	NDSU	TK Marshall (#28) 10-yard touchdown run, Griffin Crosa (#39) kick good	3	36
3rd	6:57				NDSU	Fumble recovery returned 79 yards for touchdown by Dawson Weber (#2), Griffin Crosa (#39) kick good	3	43
"TOP" = time of possession. For other American football terms, see Glossary of American football.							3	43

==== Arizona (FBS) ====
North Dakota State Bison (2–0) vs Arizona Wildcats (1–1)

Quarter	1	2	3	4	Total
No. 1 Bison	7	7	14	0	28
Wildcats	7	10	7	7	31

at Arizona Stadium, Tucson, AZ

- Date: September 17, 2022
- Game time: 10:00 p.m. (CT)
- Game weather: Clear; 86 °F (30 °C); Wind: NE
- Game attendance: 41,211
- Referee: Mike McCabe
- TV announcers (FS1): Alex Faust, Petros Papadakis

Statistics	North Dakota State	Arizona
First downs	21	23
Plays–yards	57–407	64–394
Rushes–yards	45–283	36–165
Passing yards	124	229
Passing: comp–att–int	10–12–0	20–28–0
Time of possession	31:18	28:42

Team	Category	Player	Statistics
North Dakota State	Passing	Cam Miller	10/12, 124 yds, TD
North Dakota State	Rushing	Hunter Luepke	18 car, 115 yds, 2 TD
North Dakota State	Receiving	Noah Gindorff	3 rec, 30 yds
Arizona	Passing	Jayden de Laura	20/28, 229 yds, TD
Arizona	Rushing	Michael Wiley	9 car, 54 yds, TD
Arizona	Receiving	Jacob Cowing	5 rec, 55 yds, TD

Scoring summary

Quarter	Time	Drive			Team	Scoring information	Score	
Quarter	Time	Plays	Yards	TOP	Team	Scoring information	NDSU	ARIZ
1st	5:18	8	59	3:45	ARIZ	Michael Wiley (#6) 15-yard touchdown run, Tyler Loop (#33) kick good	0	7
1st	0:59	9	80	4:12	NDSU	Hunter Luepke (#44) 31-yard touchdown reception from Cam Miller (#7), Griffin Crosa (#39) kick good	7	7
2nd	5:45	10	83	4:44	ARIZ	Jayden de Laura (#7) 7-yard touchdown run, Tyler Loop (#33) kick good	7	14
2nd	0:50	9	75	4:45	NDSU	Cam Miller (#7) 2-yard touchdown run, Griffin Crosa (#39) kick good	14	14
2nd	0:00	4	56	0:50	ARIZ	36-yard field goal by Tyler Loop (#33)	14	17
3rd	9:40	6	76	2:45	NDSU	Hunter Luepke (#44) 6-yard touchdown run, Griffin Crosa (#39) kick good	21	17
3rd	5:41	8	75	3:59	ARIZ	Jonah Coleman (#24) 2-yard touchdown run, Tyler Loop (#33) kick good	21	24
3rd	2:07	7	75	3:34	NDSU	Hunter Luepke (#44) 38-yard touchdown run, Griffin Crosa (#39) kick good	28	24
4th	4:53	10	78	4:06	ARIZ	Jacob Cowing (#2) 22-yard touchdown reception from Jayden de Laura (#7), Tyler Loop (#33) kick good	28	31
"TOP" = time of possession. For other American football terms, see Glossary of American football.							28	31

==== South Dakota ====
North Dakota State Bison (2–1) vs. South Dakota Coyotes (1–2)

Quarter	1	2	3	4	Total
No. 1 Bison	0	10	14	10	34
Coyotes	3	14	0	0	17

at DakotaDome, Vermillion, SD

- Date: September 24, 2022
- Game time: 1:00 p.m. (CT)
- Game weather: Indoors; 72 °F (22 °C)
- Game attendance: 6,530
- Referee: TBA
- TV: ESPN+

Statistics	North Dakota State	South Dakota
First downs	27	17
Plays–yards	80–476	55–266
Rushes–yards	61–356	29–146
Passing yards	120	120
Passing: comp–att–int	10–19–1	13–26–2
Time of possession	39:49	20:11

Team	Category	Player	Statistics
North Dakota State	Passing	Cam Miller	10/19, 120 yds, INT
North Dakota State	Rushing	Hunter Luepke	20 car, 150 yds, 2 TD
North Dakota State	Receiving	Zach Mathis	3 rec, 39 yds
South Dakota	Passing	Carson Camp	13/26, 120 yds, TD, 2 INT
South Dakota	Rushing	Travis Theis	10 car, 63 yds, TD
South Dakota	Receiving	Wesley Eliodor	2 rec, 51 yds, TD

Scoring summary

Quarter	Time	Drive			Team	Scoring information	Score	
Quarter	Time	Plays	Yards	TOP	Team	Scoring information	NDSU	USD
1st	0:30	12	79	5:37	USD	18-yard field goal by Eddie Ogamba (#10)	0	3
2nd	10:16	11	67	5:14	NDSU	26-yard field goal by Griffin Crosa (#39)	3	3
2nd	7:31	6	35	2:39	NDSU	Kobe Johnson (#4) 2-yard touchdown run, Griffin Crosa (#39) kick good	10	3
2nd	0:58	6	50	1:25	USD	Travis Theis (#5) 2-yard touchdown run, Eddie Ogamba (#10) kick good	10	10
2nd	0:44	1	28	0:06	USD	Wesley Eliodor (#9) 28-yard touchdown reception from Carson Camp (#18), Eddie Ogamba (#10) kick good	10	17
3rd	10:28	9	75	4:32	NDSU	Cam Miller (#7) 13-yard touchdown run, Griffin Crosa (#39) kick good	17	17
3rd	5:22	9	84	3:05	NDSU	Hunter Luepke (#44) 2-yard touchdown run, Griffin Crosa (#39) kick good	24	17
4th	8:27	15	71	7:12	NDSU	25-yard field goal by Griffin Crosa (#39)	27	17
4th	3:24	7	43	4:11	NDSU	Hunter Luepke (#44) 3-yard touchdown run, Griffin Crosa (#39) kick good	34	17
"TOP" = time of possession. For other American football terms, see Glossary of American football.							34	17

==== Youngstown State ====
Youngstown State (2–1) vs North Dakota State Bison (3–1)

Quarter	1	2	3	4	Total
Penguins	0	3	3	8	14
No. 1 Bison	14	7	0	6	27

at Fargodome, Fargo, ND

- Date: October 1, 2022
- Game time: 1:00 p.m. (CT)
- Game weather: Indoors; 70 °F (21 °C)
- Game attendance: 18,055
- Referee: TBA
- TV: ESPN+

Statistics	Youngstown State	North Dakota State
First downs	17	23
Plays–yards	50–281	64–372
Rushes–yards	30–160	46–227
Passing yards	121	145
Passing: comp–att–int	11–20–1	13–18–0
Time of possession	25:41	34:19

Team	Category	Player	Statistics
Youngstown State	Passing	Mitch Davidson	6/10, 87 yds, TD
Youngstown State	Rushing	Jaleel McLaughlin	17 car, 150 yds
Youngstown State	Receiving	Jaleel McLaughlin	3 rec, 43 yds, TD
North Dakota State	Passing	Cam Miller	13/18, 145 yds
North Dakota State	Rushing	Hunter Luepke	13 car, 72 yds, 2 TD
North Dakota State	Receiving	Joe Stoffel	4 rec, 52 yds

Scoring summary

Quarter	Time	Drive			Team	Scoring information	Score	
Quarter	Time	Plays	Yards	TOP	Team	Scoring information	YSU	NDSU
1st	7:37	5	68	2:01	NDSU	Hunter Luepke (#44) 2-yard touchdown run, Griffin Crosa (#39) kick good	0	7
1st	0:27	9	57	5:12	NDSU	Hunter Luepke (#44) 12-yard touchdown run, Griffin Crosa (#39) kick good	0	14
2nd	10:35	12	69	4:52	YSU	22-yard field goal by Colt McFadden (#19)	3	14
2nd	3:45	12	69	6:50	NDSU	Kobe Johnson 17-yard touchdown run, Griffin Crosa (#39) kick good	3	21
3rd	2:05	10	61	6:05	YSU	47-yard field goal by Colt McFadden (#19)	6	21
4th	7:45	9	39	4:18	NDSU	39-yard field goal by Griffin Crosa (#39)	6	24
4th	4:30	7	80	3:10	YSU	Jaleel McLaughlin (#8) 35-yard touchdown reception from Mitch Davidson (#14), 2-point pass good	14	24
4th	0:42	9	29	3:37	NDSU	38-yard field goal by Griffin Crosa (#39)	14	27
"TOP" = time of possession. For other American football terms, see Glossary of American football.							14	27

==== Indiana State ====
North Dakota State Bison (4–1) vs. Indiana State Sycamores (1–3)

Quarter	1	2	3	4	Total
No. 1 Bison	0	10	14	7	31
Sycamores	0	13	7	6	26

at Memorial Stadium, Terre Haute, IN

- Date: October 8, 2022
- Game time: 1:00 p.m. (CT)
- Game weather: Clear; 50 °F (10 °C)
- Game attendance: 4,185
- Referee: TBA
- TV: ESPN+

Statistics	North Dakota State	Indiana State
First downs	26	16
Plays–yards	75–516	55–340
Rushes–yards	48–306	29–178
Passing yards	210	162
Passing: comp–att–int	21–27–0	12–26–0
Time of possession	37:23	22:37

Team	Category	Player	Statistics
North Dakota State	Passing	Cam Miller	21/27, 210 yds, TD
North Dakota State	Rushing	TaMerik Williams	13 car, 145 yds, 3 TD
North Dakota State	Receiving	Zach Mathis	5 rec, 86 yds, TD
Indiana State	Passing	Cade Chambers	12/26, 162 yds, 2 TD
Indiana State	Rushing	Justin Dinka	9 car, 156 yds, TD
Indiana State	Receiving	Dante Hendrix	7 rec, 109 yds, 2 TD

Scoring summary

Quarter	Time	Drive			Team	Scoring information	Score	
Quarter	Time	Plays	Yards	TOP	Team	Scoring information	NDSU	IN ST
2nd	14:10	9	80	5:15	IN ST	Dante Hendrix (#8) 14-yard touchdown reception from Cade Chambers (#9), 2-point pass incomplete	0	6
2nd	3:34	14	58	7:24	NDSU	34-yard field goal by Griffin Crosa (#39)	3	6
2nd	2:29	5	59	1:05	IN ST	Cade Chambers (#9) 1-yard touchdown run, Ryan O'Grady (#32) kick good	3	13
2nd	1:19	4	67	1:04	NDSU	TaMerik Williams (#22) 2-yard touchdown run, Griffin Crosa (#39) kick good	10	13
3rd	10:28	9	83	4:28	NDSU	TaMerik Williams (#22) 16-yard touchdown run, Griffin Crosa (#39) kick good	17	13
3rd	10:12	1	82	0:12	IN ST	Justin Dinka (#27) 82-yard touchdown run, Ryan O'Grady (#32) kick good	17	20
3rd	6:14	8	75	3:58	NDSU	TaMerik Williams (#22) 27-yard touchdown run, Griffin Crosa (#39) kick good	24	20
4th	5:49	14	70	8:02	NDSU	Zach Mathis (#0) 10-yard touchdown reception from Cam Miller (#7), Griffin Crosa (#39) kick good	31	20
4th	2:00	10	75	3:49	IN ST	Dante Hendrix (#8) 1-yard touchdown reception from Cade Chambers (#9), 2-point run failed	31	26
"TOP" = time of possession. For other American football terms, see Glossary of American football.							31	26

==== South Dakota State ====
South Dakota State Jackrabbits (5–1) vs North Dakota State Bison (5–1)

Quarter	1	2	3	4	Total
No. 2 Jackrabbits	7	0	10	6	23
No. 1 Bison	14	7	0	0	21

at Fargodome, Fargo, ND

- Date: October 15, 2022
- Game time: 2:30 p.m. (CT)
- Game weather: Indoors; 70 °F (21 °C)
- Game attendance: 18,603
- Referee: Rick Warne
- TV: ESPN+

Statistics	South Dakota State	North Dakota State
First downs	18	17
Plays–yards	58–359	52–354
Rushes–yards	37–207	29–127
Passing yards	152	227
Passing: comp–att–int	16–21–0	17–23–1
Time of possession	34:35	25:25

Team	Category	Player	Statistics
South Dakota State	Passing	Mark Gronowski	16/21, 152 yds
South Dakota State	Rushing	Isaiah Davis	14 car, 114 yds, TD
South Dakota State	Receiving	Jadon Janke	7 rec, 83 yds
North Dakota State	Passing	Cam Miller	17/22, 227 yds, 2 TD
North Dakota State	Rushing	Hunter Luepke	15 car, 58 yds
North Dakota State	Receiving	DJ Hart	4 rec, 59 yds, TD

Scoring summary

Quarter	Time	Drive			Team	Scoring information	Score	
Quarter	Time	Plays	Yards	TOP	Team	Scoring information	SDSU	NDSU
1st	11:07	7	75	3:53	NDSU	DJ Hart (#9) 22-yard touchdown reception from Cam Miller (#7), Griffin Crosa (#39) kick good	0	7
1st	4:21	11	75	6:46	SDSU	Isaiah Davis (#22) 24-yard touchdown run, Hunter Dustman (#10) kick good	7	7
1st	3:02	3	60	1:11	NDSU	Cam Miller (#7) 6-yard touchdown run, Griffin Crosa (#39) kick good	7	14
2nd	11:08	9	59	4:36	NDSU	Hunter Luepke (#44) 30-yard touchdown reception from Cam Miller (#7), Griffin Crosa (#39) kick good	7	21
3rd	10:47	10	61	4:13	SDSU	31-yard field goal by Hunter Dustman (#10)	10	21
3rd	3:03	10	73	5:48	SDSU	Amar Johnson (#3) 16-yard touchdown run, Hunter Dustman (#10) kick good	17	21
4th	10:25	8	48	4:28	SDSU	38-yard field goal by Hunter Dustman (#10)	20	21
4th	3:49	7	58	3:57	SDSU	18-yard field goal by Hunter Dustman (#10)	23	21
"TOP" = time of possession. For other American football terms, see Glossary of American football.							23	21

==== Illinois State ====
Illinois State Redbirds (5–2) vs North Dakota State Bison (5–2)

Quarter	1	2	3	4	Total
Redbirds	7	0	0	0	7
No. 4 Bison	7	3	7	7	24

at Fargodome, Fargo, ND

- Date: October 29, 2022
- Game time: 2:30 p.m. (CT)
- Game weather: Indoors; 70 °F (21 °C)
- Game attendance: 16,172
- Referee: Grant Henderson
- TV: ESPN+

Statistics	Illinois State	North Dakota State
First downs	10	21
Plays–yards	50–219	68–373
Rushes–yards	28–76	37–192
Passing yards	143	181
Passing: comp–att–int	16–21–1	21–31–0
Time of possession	25:54	34:06

Team	Category	Player	Statistics
Illinois State	Passing	Zack Annexstad	16/22, 143 yds, TD, INT
Illinois State	Rushing	Pha'leak Brown	13 car, 41 yds
Illinois State	Receiving	Jalen Carr	4 rec, 42 yds
North Dakota State	Passing	Cam Miller	20/30, 174 yds, TD
North Dakota State	Rushing	Kobe Johnson	10 car, 51 yds
North Dakota State	Receiving	Braylon Henderson	4 rec, 67 yds

Scoring summary

Quarter	Time	Drive			Team	Scoring information	Score	
Quarter	Time	Plays	Yards	TOP	Team	Scoring information	ILL ST	NDSU
1st	3:24	9	75	4:17	ILL ST	Daniel Sobkowicz (#12) 13-yard touchdown reception from Zack Annexstad (#5), Ian Wagner (#31) kick good	7	0
1st	0:43	6	75	2:41	NDSU	Hunter Luepke (#44) 20-yard touchdown reception from Cam Miller (#7), Griffin Crosa (#39) kick good	7	7
2nd	0:04	9	41	2:00	NDSU	29-yard field goal by Griffin Crosa (#39)	7	10
3rd	7:45	6	44	2:58	NDSU	Cam Miller (#7) 4-yard touchdown run, Griffin Crosa (#39) kick good	7	17
4th	7:30	11	52	5:20	NDSU	Cole Payton (#15) 12-yard touchdown run, Griffin Crosa (#39) kick good	7	24
"TOP" = time of possession. For other American football terms, see Glossary of American football.							7	24

==== Western Illinois ====
North Dakota State Bison (6–2) vs. Western Illinois Leathernecks (0–8)

Quarter	1	2	3	4	Total
No. 4 Bison	14	14	21	7	56
Leathernecks	0	10	0	7	17

at Hanson Field, Macomb, IL

- Date: November 5, 2022
- Game time: 1:00 p.m. (CT)
- Game weather: Cloudy; 45 °F (7 °C); Wind: S 15 mph
- Game attendance: 2,534
- Referee: TBA
- TV: ESPN+

Statistics	North Dakota State	Western Illinois
First downs	21	17
Plays–yards	60–480	70–321
Rushes–yards	55–453	34–133
Passing yards	27	188
Passing: comp–att–int	3–5–1	21–36–4
Time of possession	31:05	28:55

Team	Category	Player	Statistics
North Dakota State	Passing	Cole Payton	1/2, 15 yds
North Dakota State	Rushing	TaMerik Williams	12 car, 120 yds, 2 TD
North Dakota State	Receiving	Joe Stoffel	2 rec, 21 yds
Western Illinois	Passing	Clay Bruno	21/36, 188 yds, 2 TD, 4 INT
Western Illinois	Rushing	Clay Bruno	9 car, 42 yds
Western Illinois	Receiving	Jafar Armstrong	3 rec, 85 yds, 2 TD

Scoring summary

Quarter	Time	Drive			Team	Scoring information	Score	
Quarter	Time	Plays	Yards	TOP	Team	Scoring information	NDSU	WIU
1st	14:10	1	47	0:08	NDSU	Kobe Johnson (#4) 47-yard touchdown run, Griffin Crosa (#39) kick good	7	0
1st	11:14	3	38	1:19	NDSU	TaMerik Williams (#22) 25-yard touchdown run, Griffin Crosa (#39) kick good	14	0
2nd	14:05	12	43	6:23	WIU	40-yard field goal by Mason Laramie (#9)	14	3
2nd	8:42	10	75	5:23	NDSU	Hunter Luepke (#44) 19-yard touchdown run, Griffin Crosa (#39) kick good	21	3
2nd	2:43	7	46	4:00	NDSU	TaMerik Williams (#22) 4-yard touchdown run, Griffin Crosa (#39) kick good	28	3
2nd	0:51	8	65	1:52	WIU	Jafar Armstrong (#9) 14-yard touchdown reception from Clay Bruno (#5), Mason Laramie (#9) kick good	28	10
3rd	11:51				NDSU	Interception returned 43 yards for touchdown by Marques Sigle (#27), Griffin Crosa (#39) kick good	35	10
3rd	6:58	7	53	3:28	NDSU	Cam Miller (#7) 4-yard touchdown run, Griffin Crosa (#39) kick good	42	10
3rd	0:43	10	64	5:10	NDSU	TK Marshall (#28) 1-yard touchdown run, Griffin Crosa (#39) kick good	49	10
4th	14:25	4	68	1:13	WIU	Jafar Armstrong (#9) 58-yard touchdown reception from Clay Bruno (#5), Mason Laramie (#9) kick good	49	17
4th	14:12	1	65	0:13	NDSU	TK Marshall (#28) 65-yard touchdown run, Griffin Crosa (#39) kick good	56	17
"TOP" = time of possession. For other American football terms, see Glossary of American football.							56	17

==== Southern Illinois ====
North Dakota State Bison (7–2) vs. Southern Illinois Salukis (5–4)

Quarter	1	2	3	4	Total
No. 4 Bison	7	0	0	14	21
Salukis	0	3	7	8	18

at Saluki Stadium, Carbondale, IL

- Date: November 12, 2022
- Game time: 1:00 p.m. (CT)
- Game weather: Cloudy; 35 °F (2 °C); Wind: NW 11 mph
- Game attendance: 4,575
- Referee: TBA
- TV: ESPN+

Statistics	North Dakota State	Southern Illinois
First downs	17	18
Plays–yards	47–229	67–307
Rushes–yards	37–149	42–121
Passing yards	80	186
Passing: comp–att–int	6–10–0	16–25–1
Time of possession	26:03	33:57

Team	Category	Player	Statistics
North Dakota State	Passing	Cam Miller	6/10, 80 yds, TD
North Dakota State	Rushing	TaMerik Williams	12 car, 56 yds, TD
North Dakota State	Receiving	Kobe Johnson	1 rec, 27 yds, TD
Southern Illinois	Passing	Nic Baker	15/24, 173 yds, TD, INT
Southern Illinois	Rushing	Javon Williams Jr.	21 car, 66 yds
Southern Illinois	Receiving	Bryce Miller	4 rec, 70 yds

Scoring summary

Quarter	Time	Drive			Team	Scoring information	Score	
Quarter	Time	Plays	Yards	TOP	Team	Scoring information	NDSU	SIU
1st	6:02	6	78	3:09	NDSU	Kobe Johnson (#4) 27-yard touchdown reception from Cam Miller (#7), Griffin Crosa (#39) kick good	7	0
2nd	0:00	5	28	2:15	SIU	28-yard field goal by Jake Baumgarte (#91)	7	3
3rd	5:18	13	60	7:31	SIU	Jacob Garrett (#43) 1-yard touchdown run, Jake Baumgarte (#91) kick good	7	10
4th	14:21	10	69	5:54	NDSU	Cam Miller (#7) 5-yard touchdown run, Griffin Crosa (#39) kick good	14	10
4th	4:40	13	75	7:38	NDSU	TaMerik Williams (#22) 3-yard touchdown run, Griffin Crosa (#39) kick good	21	10
4th	0:39	14	81	3:54	SIU	D'Ante Cox (#2) 6-yard touchdown reception from Nic Baker (#8), 2-point pass good	21	18
"TOP" = time of possession. For other American football terms, see Glossary of American football.							21	18

==== North Dakota ====
North Dakota Fighting Hawks (7–3) vs North Dakota State Bison (8–2)

Quarter	1	2	3	4	Total
No. 16 Fighting Hawks	0	14	7	0	21
No. 4 Bison	14	14	14	0	42

at Fargodome, Fargo, ND

- Date: November 19, 2022
- Game time: 2:30 p.m. (CT)
- Game weather: Indoors; 70 °F (21 °C)
- Game attendance: 18,806
- Referee: TBA
- TV: ESPN+

Statistics	North Dakota	North Dakota State
First downs	15	22
Plays–yards	57–318	67–522
Rushes–yards	35–165	55–363
Passing yards	153	159
Passing: comp–att–int	11–22–0	8–12–0
Time of possession	24:35	35:25

Team	Category	Player	Statistics
North Dakota	Passing	Tommy Schuster	11/19, 153 yds, TD
North Dakota	Rushing	Tyler Hoosman	13 car, 75 yds
North Dakota	Receiving	Bo Belquist	4 rec, 102 yds
North Dakota State	Passing	Cam Miller	8/12, 159 yds
North Dakota State	Rushing	Kobe Johnson	12 car, 115 yds
North Dakota State	Receiving	DJ Hart	2 rec, 83 yds

Scoring summary

Quarter	Time	Drive			Team	Scoring information	Score	
Quarter	Time	Plays	Yards	TOP	Team	Scoring information	UND	NDSU
1st	12:36	2	50	0:43	NDSU	TaMerik Williams (#22) 51-yard touchdown run, Griffin Crosa (#39) kick good	0	7
1st	5:13	8	97	3:36	NDSU	Cam Miller (#7) 4-yard touchdown run, Griffin Crosa (#39) kick good	0	14
2nd	14:08	6	60	3:17	NDSU	Cam Miller (#7) 7-yard touchdown run, Griffin Crosa (#39) kick good	0	21
2nd	12:40	3	65	1:28	UND	Quincy Vaughn (#14) 1-yard touchdown run, Brady Stevens (#92) kick good	7	21
2nd	5:27	13	92	7:07	NDSU	Cam Miller (#7) 3-yard touchdown run, Griffin Crosa (#39) kick good	7	28
2nd	0:06	13	78	1:52	UND	Garett Maag (#89) 18-yard touchdown reception from Tommy Schuster (#2), Brady Stevens (#92) kick good	14	28
3rd	13:19	4	45	1:25	NDSU	Cam Miller (#7) 5-yard touchdown run, Griffin Crosa (#7) kick good	14	35
3rd	7:41	10	72	5:33	UND	Quincy Vaughn(#14) 1-yard touchdown run, Brady Stevens (#92) kick good	21	35
3rd	1:22	13	80	6:13	NDSU	Cam Miller (#7) 30-yard touchdown run, Griffin Crosa (#39) kick good	21	42
"TOP" = time of possession. For other American football terms, see Glossary of American football.							21	42

=== NCAA Division I playoffs ===
==== Montana (second round) ====
Montana Grizzlies (8–4) vs North Dakota State Bison (9–2)

Quarter	1	2	3	4	Total
No. 19 Grizzlies	7	6	7	6	26
No. 4 (3) Bison	14	7	14	14	49

at Fargodome, Fargo, ND

- Date: December 3, 2022
- Game time: 2:30 p.m. (CT)
- Game weather: Indoors; 70 °F (21 °C)
- Game attendance: 12,929
- Referee: Matt Overton
- TV announcers (ESPN+): Connor Onion, Charles Arbuckle

Statistics	Montana	North Dakota State
First downs	19	19
Plays–yards	79–346	52–511
Rushes–yards	44–163	42–453
Passing yards	183	58
Passing: comp–att–int	21–35–2	6–10–1
Time of possession	31:23	28:37

Team	Category	Player	Statistics
Montana	Passing	Britt Daniel	12/20, 108 yds, TD, 2 INT
Montana	Rushing	Isiah Childs	17 car, 99 yds
Montana	Receiving	Aaron Fontes	5 rec, 75 yds
North Dakota State	Passing	Cam Miller	6/10, 58 yds, INT
North Dakota State	Rushing	Kobe Johnson	12 car, 206 yds, 2 TD
North Dakota State	Receiving	Zach Mathis	2 rec, 35 yds

Scoring summary

Quarter	Time	Drive			Team	Scoring information	Score	
Quarter	Time	Plays	Yards	TOP	Team	Scoring information	MONT	NDSU
1st	8:42	6	76	5:59	NDSU	Cam Miller (#7) 10-yard touchdown run, Griffin Crosa (#39) kick good	0	7
1st	5:57	3	73	0:55	NDSU	Cam Miller (#7) 68-yard touchdown run, Griffin Crosa (#39) kick good	0	14
1st	1:18	13	66	4:33	MONT	Lucas Johnson (#7) 1-yard touchdown run, Nico Ramos (#83) kick good	7	14
2nd	9:26	10	67	3:55	MONT	39-yard field goal by Nico Ramos (#83)	10	14
2nd	0:58				NDSU	Fumble recovery returned 0 yards for touchdown by Cole Wisniewski (#31), Griffin Crosa (#39) kick good	10	21
2nd	0:09	5	32	0:43	MONT	36-yard field goal by Nico Ramos (#83)	13	21
3rd	10:58				MONT	Interception returned 58 yards for touchdown by Corbin Walker (#8), Nico Ramos (#83) kick good	20	21
3rd	10:46	1	75	0:12	NDSU	Kobe Johnson (#4) 75-yard touchdown run, Griffin Crosa (#39) kick good	20	28
3rd	6:51	2	70	0:51	NDSU	TaMerik Williams (#22) 68-yard touchdown run, Griffin Crosa (#39) kick good	20	35
4th	13:17	2	85	0:33	NDSU	Kobe Johnson (#4) 73-yard touchdown run, Griffin Crosa (#39) kick good	20	42
4th	5:24	9	87	5:59	NDSU	TK Marshall (#28) 7-yard touchdown run, Griffin Crosa (#39) kick good	20	49
4th	1:05	13	75	4:19	MONT	Keelan White (#6) 18-yard touchdown reception from Daniel Britt (#8), Nico Ramos (#83) kick blocked	26	49
"TOP" = time of possession. For other American football terms, see Glossary of American football.							26	49

==== Samford (quarterfinal) ====
Samford Bulldogs (11–1) vs. North Dakota State Bison (10–2)

Quarter	1	2	3	4	Total
No. 8 (6) Bulldogs	0	0	0	9	9
No. 4 (3) Bison	0	10	14	3	27

at Fargodome, Fargo, ND

- Date: December 9, 2022
- Game time: 6:00 p.m. (CT)
- Game weather: Indoors; 70 °F (21 °C)
- Game attendance: 11,825
- Referee: Reed Brotherton
- TV announcers (ESPN2): Tiffany Greene, Jay Walker, Taylor Davis

Statistics	Samford	North Dakota State
First downs	19	21
Plays–yards	71–336	66–360
Rushes–yards	24–57	48–166
Passing yards	279	194
Passing: comp–att–int	30–47–1	15–18–0
Time of possession	20:55	39:05

Team	Category	Player	Statistics
Samford	Passing	Michael Hiers	22/30, 227 yds, TD, INT
Samford	Rushing	Jay Stanton	10 car, 39 yds
Samford	Receiving	Chandler Smith	6 rec, 120 yds, TD
North Dakota State	Passing	Cam Miller	15/18, 194 yds, TD
North Dakota State	Rushing	Kobe Johnson	15 car, 48 yds
North Dakota State	Receiving	Joe Stoffel	3 rec, 60 yds, TD

Scoring summary

Quarter	Time	Drive			Team	Scoring information	Score	
Quarter	Time	Plays	Yards	TOP	Team	Scoring information	SAM	NDSU
2nd	1:25	12	69	7:28	NDSU	Joe Stoffel (#82) 2-yard touchdown reception from Cam Miller (#7), Griffin Crosa (#39) kick good	0	7
2nd	0:00	3	24	0:25	NDSU	44-yard field goal by Griffin Crosa (#39)	0	10
3rd	10:57	7	82	3:59	NDSU	TK Marshall (#28) 7-yard touchdown run, Griffin Crosa (#39) kick good	0	17
3rd	2:02	12	63	7:15	NDSU	Cam Miller (#7) 1-yard touchdown run, Griffin Crosa (#39) kick good	0	24
4th	12:08	12	66	4:48	SAM	28-yard field goal by Zach Williams (#59)	3	24
4th	6:04	9	71	6:04	NDSU	22-yard field goal by Griffin Crosa (#39)	3	27
4th	3:53	8	75	2:11	SAM	Chandler Smith (#0) 40-yard touchdown reception from Michael Hiers (#10), 2-point pass incomplete	9	27
"TOP" = time of possession. For other American football terms, see Glossary of American football.							9	27

==== Incarnate Word (semifinal) ====
Incarnate Word Cardinals (12–1) vs North Dakota State Bison (11–2)

Quarter	1	2	3	4	Total
No. 5 (7) Cardinals	16	0	13	3	32
No. 4 (3) Bison	3	14	7	11	35

at Fargodome, Fargo, ND

- Date: December 16, 2022
- Game time: 6:00 p.m. (CT)
- Game weather: Indoors; 70 °F (21 °C)
- Game attendance: 12,569
- Referee: Eric Lewis
- TV announcers (ESPN2): Drew Carter, Aaron Murray, Marilyn Payne

Statistics	Incarnate Word	North Dakota State
First downs	29	15
Plays–yards	94–539	60–333
Rushes–yards	48–257	48–328
Passing yards	282	5
Passing: comp–att–int	30–46–2	1–12–0
Time of possession	28:57	31:03

Team	Category	Player	Statistics
Incarnate Word	Passing	Lindsey Scott Jr.	30/46, 282 yds, TD, 2 INT
Incarnate Word	Rushing	Marcus Cooper	20 car, 112 yds
Incarnate Word	Receiving	Taylor Grimes	7 rec, 77 yds
North Dakota State	Passing	Cam Miller	1/12, 5 yds
North Dakota State	Rushing	Kobe Johnson	15 car, 136 yds, 3 TD
North Dakota State	Receiving	Joe Stoffel	1 rec, 5 yds

Scoring summary

Quarter	Time	Drive			Team	Scoring information	Score	
Quarter	Time	Plays	Yards	TOP	Team	Scoring information	UIW	NDSU
1st	10:37	10	75	4:23	UIW	Darion Chafin (#0) 1-yard touchdown reception from Lindsey Scott Jr. (#1), Carson Mohr (#50) kick good	7	0
1st	7:42	6	85	1:26	UIW	Jarrell Wiley (#22) 15-yard touchdown run, Carson Mohr (#50) kick good	14	0
1st	7:33				UIW	TK Marshall (#28) tackled in end zone for a safety by Isaiah Paul (#21)	16	0
1st	2:15	4	-7	1:35	NDSU	27-yard field goal by Griffin Crosa (#39)	16	3
2nd	4:46	8	93	3:59	NDSU	Kobe Johnson (#4) 4-yard touchdown run, Griffin Crosa (#39) kick good	16	10
2nd	0:47	5	17	2:44	NDSU	Cam Miller (#7) 2-yard touchdown run, Griffin Crosa (#39) kick good	16	17
3rd	12:56	4	74	1:58	NDSU	Kobe Johnson (#7) 49-yard touchdown run, Griffin Crosa (#39) kick good	16	24
3rd	7:05	15	75	5:51	UIW	Lindsey Scott Jr. (#1) 1-yard touchdown run, 2-point pass incomplete	22	24
3rd	2:59	5	61	1:05	UIW	Lindsey Scott Jr. (#1) 1-yard touchdown run, Carson Mohr (#50) kick good	29	24
4th	13:03	9	37	4:49	NDSU	47-yard field goal by Griffin Crosa (#39)	29	27
4th	9:38	10	51	3:25	UIW	41-yard field goal by Carson Mohr (#50)	32	27
4th	8:11	3	65	1:27	NDSU	Kobe Johnson (#4) 31-yard touchdown run, 2-point pass good	32	35
"TOP" = time of possession. For other American football terms, see Glossary of American football.							32	35

==== South Dakota State (national championship) ====
North Dakota State Bison (12–2) vs. South Dakota State Jackrabbits (13–1)

Quarter	1	2	3	4	Total
No. 4 (3) Bison	7	7	0	7	21
No. 1 (1) Jackrabbits	7	24	7	7	45

at Toyota Stadium, Frisco, TX

- Date: January 8, 2023
- Game time: 1:00 p.m. (CT)
- Game weather: Sunny; 56 °F (13 °C); Wind: N 5 MPH
- Game attendance: 18,023
- Referee: Jeff Page
- TV announcers (ABC): Roy Philpott, Jay Walker, Paul Carcaterra

Statistics	North Dakota State	South Dakota State
First downs	21	22
Plays–yards	66-420	59-506
Rushes–yards	37-160	38-283
Passing yards	260	223
Passing: comp–att–int	18-29-2	14-21-0
Time of possession	28:00	32:00

Team	Category	Player	Statistics
North Dakota State	Passing	Cam Miller	18/29, 260 yds, 2 TD, 2 INT
North Dakota State	Rushing	Cam Miller	13 car, 64 yds
North Dakota State	Receiving	Zach Mathis	7 rec, 123 yds
South Dakota State	Passing	Mark Gronowski	14/21, 223 yds, 3 TD
South Dakota State	Rushing	Amar Johnson	9 car, 126 yds, TD
South Dakota State	Receiving	Jadon Janke	5 rec, 61 yds

Scoring summary

Quarter	Time	Drive			Team	Scoring information	Score	
Quarter	Time	Plays	Yards	TOP	Team	Scoring information	NDSU	SDSU
1st	9:12	9	85	4:04	SDSU	Isaiah Davis (#22) 16-yard touchdown run, Hunter Dustman (#10) kick good	0	7
1st	6:31	6	75	2:41	NDSU	Joe Stoffel (#82) 27-yard touchdown reception from Cam Miller (#7), Griffin Crosa (#39) kick good	7	7
2nd	12:50	8	77	4:37	SDSU	Amar Johnson (#3) 31-yard touchdown run, Hunter Dustman (#10) kick good	7	14
2nd	11:03	4	34	1:31	SDSU	Jaxon Janke (#10) 18-yard touchdown reception from Mark Gronowski (#11), Hunter Dustman (#10) kick good	7	21
2nd	3:30	9	84	4:17	SDSU	Michael Morgan (#34) 44-yard touchdown reception from Mark Gronowski (#11), Hunter Dustman (#10) kick good	7	28
2nd	2:03	4	65	1:27	NDSU	Eli Green (#86) 44-yard touchdown reception from Cam Miller (#7), Griffin Crosa (#39) kick good	14	28
2nd	0:00	6	62	2:03	SDSU	30-yard field goal by Hunter Dustman (#10)	14	31
3rd	13:13	3	74	1:41	SDSU	Mark Gronowski (#11) 51-yard touchdown run, Hunter Dustman (#10) kick good	14	38
4th	13:44	16	99	7:51	NDSU	Kobe Johnson (#4) 9-yard touchdown run, Griffin Crosa (#39) kick good	21	38
4th	8:05	4	42	2:35	SDSU	Jaxon Janke (#10) 30-yard touchdown reception from Mark Gronowski (#11), Hunter Dustman (#10) kick good	21	45
"TOP" = time of possession. For other American football terms, see Glossary of American football.							21	25

== Roster ==
2022 North Dakota State Bison football team roster
Players
Coaches
Offense

Pos.	#	Name	Class
WR	0	Zach Mathis	Sr
WR	2	Kellen Entz	Fr
RB	4	Kobe Johnson	Sr
WR	5	Bryce Lance	Fr
WR	6	Cedric Wall	Fr
QB	7	Cam Miller	Jr
RB	8	Barika Kpeenu	Fr
WR	12	Braylon Henderson	Jr
QB	14	Nathan Hayes	Fr
QB	15	Cole Payton	Fr
QB	16	Peter Anderson	Fr
WR	17	Raja Nelson	Jr
WR	19	Jake Lippe	Jr
RB	21	Jalen Bussey	Jr
RB	22	TaMerik Williams	Sr
RB	28	TK Marshall	Jr
WR	32	John Gores	Fr
FB	33	Logan Hofstedt	Jr
FB	34	Luke Waters	Sr
TE	35	Kelby Azure	Fr
TE	36	Nate Forystek	Fr
TE	40	Kaden Zenzen	Fr
FB	44	Hunter Luepke	Sr
RB	45	Owen Johnson	Fr
FB	46	Truman Werremeyer	Fr
TE	47	Luke Kokat	Fr
FB	49	Hunter Brozio	Jr
OL	50	Kaden Chadwick	Fr
C	57	Braden Rucker	Fr
G	59	Hayden Johnston	So
OL	60	Ben Goldy	Fr
G	63	Jake Kubas	Sr
G	66	Nash Jensen	Sr
OL	67	Max Rader	Fr
OT	68	Sam Henry	Fr
OL	69	Devin Lockerby	Fr
OT	70	Cody Mauch	Sr
G	71	Luke Lacilento	Sr
C	72	Jalen Sundell	Sr
OT	73	Mason Miller	Jr
G	74	Grey Zabel	Jr
OT	75	Trevor Fiecko	Fr
OT	76	Hunter Poncius	Jr
C	77	Brandon Westberg	Jr
OT	78	Jake Rock	Jr
WR	80	Tyler Terhark	So
WR	81	Carson Hegerle	Fr
TE	82	Joe Stoffel	Jr
WR	83	Giancarlo Volpentesta	Jr
WR	84	Chris Harris	Fr
TE	85	Jacob Streit	Sr
WR	86	Mekhi Collins	Fr
WR	86	Eli Green	Fr
TE	87	Noah Gindorff	Sr
TE	88	Carson Williams	Fr
TE	89	Finn Diggins	Fr

Defense

Pos.	#	Name	Class
CB	1	Courtney Eubanks	Jr
S	2	Dawson Weber	Sr
CB	6	Destin Talbert	Sr
S	10	Dom Jones	Jr
CB	13	Anthony Coleman	Jr
LB	14	Enock Sibomana	Fr
LB	20	Julian Wlodarczyk	Sr
S	21	Hudson Artz	Fr
CB	23	Jayden Price	Sr
CB	24	Jenaro Ocama	Jr
S	25	Michael Tutsie	Sr
LB	26	James Kaczor	Sr
S	27	Ryan Jones	Fr
CB	29	Jaquise Alexander	Fr
DB	30	Darius Givance	Fr
LB	31	Cole Wisniewski	Jr
S	32	Ty Satter	So
CB	34	Kegan Huber	Fr
S	35	Sam Jung	Jr
LB	36	Nick Kubitz	Jr
S	37	Reggie King	Fr
DB	38	Isaac Hyland	Fr
CB	40	Alex Oechsner	Fr
LB	42	Oscar Benson	So
LB	43	Logan Kopp	Fr
LB	45	Brit Senftner	Fr
LB	47	Luke Weerts	Jr
LB	50	Brayden Weber	Fr
LB	51	Cade Powers	Jr
LB	51	Austin Altepeter	Fr
LB	52	Nathaniel Staehling	Fr
LB	52	Dylan Taves	Jr
DT	53	Eli Mostaert	Jr
DE	54	Jake Kava	Sr
DE	55	Kole Menz	Fr
DE	56	Loshiaka Roques	So
DE	57	Allante Burley	Fr
DT	61	Kody Huisman	Fr
DT	62	John Kaczor	Fr
DT	64	Jaxon Duttenhefer	Fr
DT	65	Bryce Friday	So
DT	71	Trevor Brown	Fr
DE	90	Tony Pierce	Sr
DT	91	Will Mostaert	Jr
DE	92	Kelton McCaslin	Fr
DE	93	Toby Anene	Fr
DT	94	Logan Larson	Fr
DE	95	Dylan Hendricks	Jr
DE	96	Reed Ryan	Jr
DE	97	Gannon Williams	Fr
DT	98	Josh Magin	Fr
DE	99	Spencer Waege	Sr

Special teams

Pos.	#	Name	Class
K	37	Drew Klein	Fr
P	38	Will Cardinal	Jr
K	39	Griffin Crosa	Jr
P	41	Kaedin Steindorf	So
LS	48	Caleb Bowers	Fr

Head coach

- Matt Entz (head coach)

Coordinators/assistant coaches

- Randy Hedberg (Associate HC / passing game coordinator / quarterbacks)
- Tyler Roehl (offensive coordinator / tight ends / fullbacks)
- David Braun (defensive coordinator)
- Kody Morgan (special teams coordinator / safeties)
- Joe Beshorner (running backs)
- Nick Goeser (defensive line)
- Dan Larson (offensive line)
- Grant Olson (linebackers)
- Noah Pauley (wide receivers)
- Lewis Walker (cornerbacks)
- Seth Hestness (offensive quality control)
- Mike Peters (offensive analyst)
- Brett Watson (defensive quality control)

Legend

- (C) Team captain
- (S) Suspended
- (I) Ineligible
- Injured
- Redshirt

Roster
Last update: November 28, 2022

== 2023 NFL draft ==
The following Bison players were selected in the 2023 NFL draft:

Player	Position	School	Draft Round	Round Pick	Overall Pick	Team
Cody Mauch	OT	North Dakota State	2	17	48	Tampa Bay Buccaneers

== Rankings ==
Ranking movements Legend: ██ Increase in ranking ██ Decrease in ranking
	Week													
Poll	Pre	1	2	3	4	5	6	7	8	9	10	11	12	Final
STATS	1	1	1	1	1	1	1	4	4	4	4	4	4	2
Coaches	1	1	1	1	1	1	1	4	4	4	4	4	4	2
