= Zach Mathis =

Canadian-American football player (born 2000)

No. 81 – Edmonton Elks
- Position: Wide receiver
- Roster status: Active
- CFL status: National

Personal information
- Born: February 29, 2000 (age 26); Tampa, Florida, U.S.
- Listed height: 6 ft 7 in (2.01 m)
- Listed weight: 203 lb (92 kg)

Career information
- High school: Berkeley Prep (Tampa)
- College: North Dakota State

Career history
- 2024–present: Edmonton Elks

Awards and highlights
- Grey Cup champion (2026); 3× FCS national champion (2018–2019, 2021)
- Stats at CFL.ca

Zach Mathis (born February 29, 2000) is a Canadian-American professional football wide receiver for the Edmonton Elks of the Canadian Football League (CFL). He played college football at North Dakota State.

== Early life ==
Mathis played high school football at Berkeley Preparatory School in Tampa, Florida, and was a four-year letterman and two-year starter. He caught 20 passes for 351 yards and five touchdowns as a senior. He was invited to the Blue-Grey All-American Game. Mathis earned honorable mention all-county honors in both football and basketball in high school.

== College career ==
Mathis played college football for the North Dakota State Bison from 2018 to 2023. He played in one game in 2018, but did not record a catch, and was redshirted. He appeared in nine games in 2019 and totaled five receptions for 79 yards. Mathis played in North Dakota State's only game of the fall 2020 season, and caught one pass for 16 yards. The rest of the 2020 season was moved to spring 2021 due to the COVID-19 pandemic. However, Mathis did not appear in any games in spring 2021 due to injury. He played in 12 games, starting two, during the fall 2021 season, recording eight receptions for 112 yards.

Mathis played in all 15 games, starting 10, in 2022, totaling 35 receptions for 520 yards and three touchdowns. He led the team in receptions and receiving yards and finished second in receiving touchdowns. He caught seven passes for 123 yards in the national championship game loss to South Dakota State. Mathis was also named to the Missouri Valley Football Conference Honor Roll that season. He appeared in all 15 games, starting 13 games, in 2023, catching 46 catches for 665 yards and six touchdowns. He led the Bison in receptions and receiving touchdowns while finishing second in receiving yards. Mathis was also one of six team captains that season.

== Professional career ==
Pre-draft measurables
Height	Weight	Arm length	Hand span	Wingspan	40-yard dash	10-yard split	20-yard split	20-yard shuttle	Three-cone drill	Vertical jump	Broad jump
6 ft 6 5/8 in (2.00 m)	220 lb (100 kg)	33 1/4 in (0.84 m)	9 5/8 in (0.24 m)	6 ft 7 1/8 in (2.01 m)	4.64 s	1.63 s	2.67 s	4.51 s	7.14 s	36.5 in (0.93 m)	9 ft 11 in (3.02 m)
All values from Pro Day

After going undrafted in the 2024 NFL draft, Mathis attended rookie minicamp on a tryout basis with the Tampa Bay Buccaneers.

On June 29, 2024, the Edmonton Elks forfeited their first round pick in the 2025 CFL draft to select Mathis in a supplemental draft. He officially signed with the team on July 7.

== Personal life ==
In 2024, Mathis acquired his Canadian citizenship via parental birth.
