= 2015 NCAA Division I Football Championship Game =

Postseason college football game

2015 NCAA Division I Football Championship
- FCS National Championship Game
North Dakota State Bison	Illinois State Redbirds
(14–1)	(13–1)
MVFC	MVFC
29	27
Head coach: Chris Klieman	Head coach: Brock Spack
TSN / Seed; 2 / 2	TSN / Seed; 7 / 5
	1	2	3	4	Total
North Dakota State	3	7	10	9	29
Illinois State	7	0	7	13	27
- Date: January 10, 2015
- Season: 2014
- Stadium: Toyota Stadium
- Location: Frisco, Texas
- MVP: Carson Wentz (QB, North Dakota State)
- Favorite: North Dakota State by 6.5
- Referee: Eddy Shelton (Southland)
- Attendance: 20,918

United States TV coverage
- Network: ESPN2
- Announcers: Anish Shroff (play-by-play), Kelly Stouffer (color), Cara Capuano (sideline)

The 2015 NCAA Division I Football Championship Game was a postseason college football game that determined a national champion in the NCAA Division I Football Championship Subdivision for the 2014 season. It was played at Toyota Stadium in Frisco, Texas, on January 10, 2015, with kickoff at 1:00 p.m. EST, and was the culminating game of the 2014 FCS Playoffs. With sponsorship by Northwestern Mutual, the game was officially known as the NCAA FCS Championship presented by Northwestern Mutual.

== Teams ==
The participants of the 2015 NCAA Division I Football Championship Game were the finalists of the 2014 FCS Playoffs, which began with a 24-team bracket. No. 2 seed North Dakota State and No. 5 seed Illinois State qualified for the final by winning their semifinal games.

=== North Dakota State Bison ===
Led by first-year head coach Chris Klieman, the Bison finished the regular season 11–1, 7–1 in MVFC play, to earn a conference co-championship (shared with Illinois State) and the No. 2 seed in the FCS Playoffs. North Dakota State defeated unseeded South Dakota State, No. 7 seed Coastal Carolina, and unseeded Sam Houston State to reach the final. The Bison entered the Championship game with a 3–0 record in previous FCS Championships, having won the last three straight.

=== Illinois State Redbirds ===
Led by sixth-year head coach Brock Spack, the Redbirds finished the regular season 10–1, 7–1 in MVFC play, to earn a conference co-championship (shared with North Dakota State) and the No. 5 seed in the FCS Playoffs. Illinois State defeated unseeded Northern Iowa, No. 4 seed Eastern Washington, and No. 1 seed New Hampshire to reach their first-ever final.

== Game summary ==
=== Scoring summary ===
Scoring summary

Quarter	Time	Drive			Team	Scoring information	Score	
Quarter	Time	Plays	Yards	TOP	Team	Scoring information	NDSU	ILST
1	5:28	5	38	2:33	ILST	Jon-Marc Anderson 13-yard touchdown reception from Tre Roberson, Nick Aussieker kick good	0	7
1	1:06	8	42	4:22	NDSU	41-yard field goal by Adam Keller	3	7
2	8:43	11	84	5:30	NDSU	Luke Albers 6-yard touchdown reception from Carson Wentz, Adam Keller kick good	10	7
3	12:55	4	–5	2:05	NDSU	41-yard field goal by Adam Keller	13	7
3	7:28	8	76	3:48	NDSU	John Crockett 7-yard touchdown run, Adam Keller kick good	20	7
3	2:11	8	66	5:17	ILST	James O'Shaughnessy 41-yard touchdown reception from Tre Roberson, Nick Aussieker kick good	20	14
4	11:20	12	62	5:51	NDSU	24-yard field goal by Adam Keller	23	14
4	8:05	6	84	3:15	ILST	James O'Shaughnessy 3-yard touchdown reception from Tre Roberson, Nick Aussieker kick good	23	21
4	1:38	5	80	0:44	ILST	Tre Roberson 58-yard touchdown run, 2-point pass failed	23	27
4	0:37	6	78	1:01	NDSU	Carson Wentz 5-yard touchdown run, Adam Keller kick blocked	29	27
"TOP" = time of possession. For other American football terms, see Glossary of American football.							29	27

=== Game statistics ===
	1	2	3	4	Total
No. 2 Bison	3	7	10	9	29
No. 5 Redbirds	7	0	7	13	27

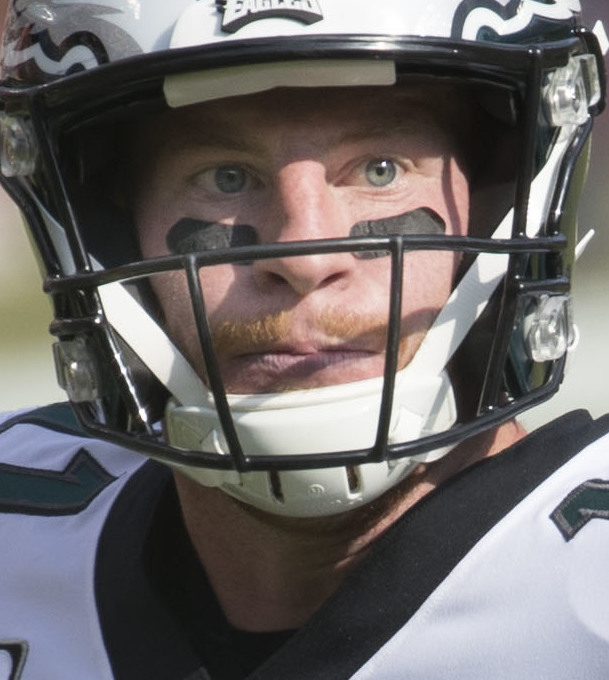
North Dakota State quarterback Carson Wentz

Statistics	NDSU	ILST
First downs	22	16
Plays–yards	72–452	50–424
Rushes–yards	50–215	27–267
Passing yards	237	157
Passing: comp–att–int	15–22–0	11–23–1
Time of possession	37:15	22:45

Team	Category	Player	Statistics
North Dakota State	Passing	Carson Wentz	15/22, 237 yds, 1 TD
North Dakota State	Rushing	Carson Wentz	16 car, 87 yds, 1 TD
North Dakota State	Receiving	R. J. Urzendowski	5 rec, 100 yds
Illinois State	Passing	Tre Roberson	11/23, 157 yds, 3 TD, 1 INT
Illinois State	Rushing	Tre Roberson	11 car, 161 yds, 1 TD
Illinois State	Receiving	James O'Shaughnessy	2 rec, 44 yds, 2 TD
