= Mark Gronowski =

American football player (born 2001)

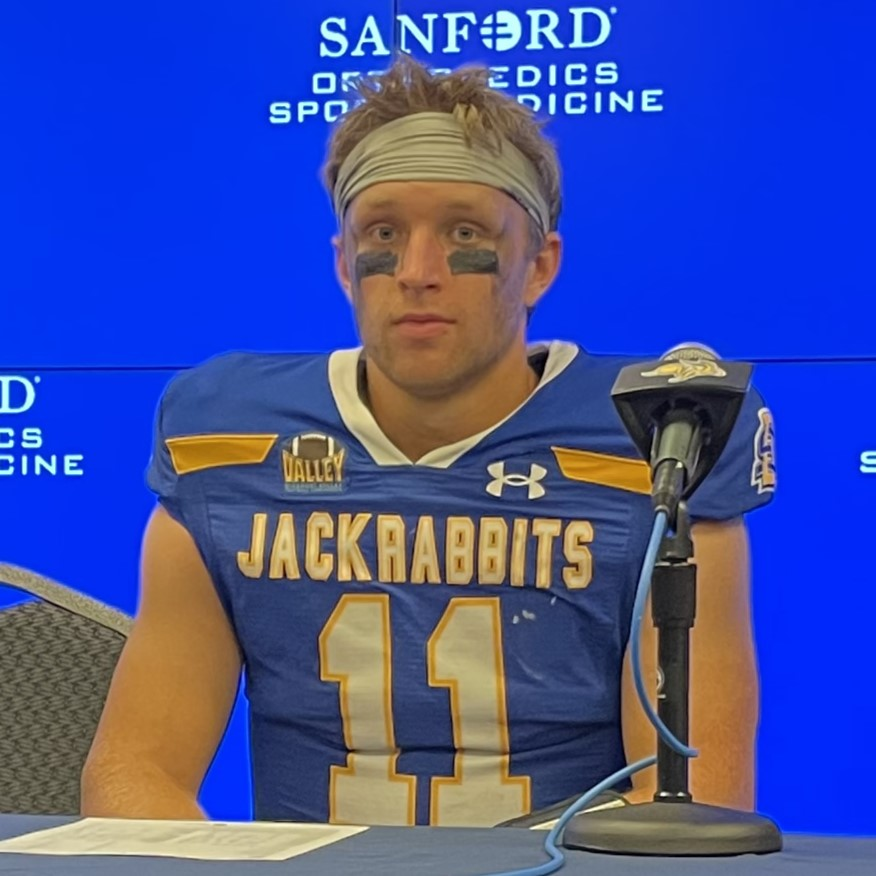
- Gronowski at a post-game press conference in 2023

Profile
- Position: Quarterback

Personal information
- Born: October 5, 2001 (age 25); Naperville, Illinois, U.S.
- Listed height: 6 ft 2 in (1.88 m)
- Listed weight: 234 lb (106 kg)

Career information
- High school: Neuqua Valley (Naperville, Illinois)
- College: South Dakota State (2020–2024); Iowa (2025)
- NFL draft: 2026: undrafted

Career history
- Miami Dolphins (2026)*; Houston Texans (2026)*
- * Offseason or practice squad member only

Awards and highlights
- 2× FCS national champion (2022, 2023); 2× FCS Championship Game MVP (2023, 2024); Walter Payton Award (2023); First-team FCS All-American (2023); 2× MVFC Offensive Player of the Year (2020, 2023); MVFC Freshman of the Year (2020); 2× First-team All-MVFC (2020, 2023); 2× Second-team All-MVFC (2022, 2024)
- Stats at Pro Football Reference

Mark Gronowski (born October 5, 2001) is an American professional football quarterback. He played college football for the South Dakota State Jackrabbits and Iowa Hawkeyes.

== Early life ==
Gronowski grew up in Naperville, Illinois and attended Neuqua Valley High School. As a senior, he completed 132 of 194 pass attempts for 1,663 yards with 15 touchdowns and one interception while also rushing for 846 yards and 12 touchdowns. Gronowski committed to play college football at South Dakota State, which was his only Division I scholarship offer, over offers from Butler and Valparaiso, which play in the non-scholarship Pioneer Football League, and from Division II Quincy and Bemidji State. He also had offers to walk-on at Iowa, Michigan State, Wisconsin, and Stanford.

== College career ==
=== South Dakota State ===
Gronowski's freshman season at South Dakota State (SDSU) was postponed from the fall to the spring of 2021 due to the COVID-19 pandemic. He was named the Jackrabbits starting quarterback going into his freshman season. Gronowski passed for 1,584 yards and 15 touchdowns and also rushed for 577 yards and seven touchdowns. He was named the Missouri Valley Football Conference (MVFC) Offensive Player of the Year, as well as the conference Freshman and Newcomer of the Year, at the end of the season. South Dakota State advanced to the 2021 NCAA Division I Football Championship Game, but Gronowski suffered a serious knee injury on the first offensive drive of the game and the team lost 23–21 to Sam Houston State. He used a medical redshirt for the 2021 fall season to recover from his injury.

Gronowski returned as SDSU's starting quarterback at the beginning of the 2022 season. He was named second-team All-MVFC as the Jackrabbits returned to the FCS National Championship Game. Gronowski was named the games Most Valuable Player after dominating the Bison, completing 14 of 21 pass attempts for 223 yards and three touchdowns and rushing for 57 yards and one touchdown in a 45-21 victory over North Dakota State. He finished the season with 2,967 passing yards and 26 touchdowns with five interceptions and also rushed for 408 yards and 12 touchdowns.

Gronowski won the Walter Payton Award as a junior. South Dakota State repeated as FCS national champions and he repeated as the Most Valuable Player of the FCS Championship Game after completing 13-of-21 passes for 175 yards and one touchdown with an interception and rushing eight times for 62 yard and one touchdown in a 23-3 win against Montana. Gronowski finished the season with 3,058 passing yard and 29 touchdown passes while also rushing for 402 yards and eight touchdowns. On December 29, 2024, Gronowski entered the transfer portal.

=== Iowa ===
On January 7, 2025, Gronowski announced that he would transfer to Iowa. He was named the Hawkeyes' starting quarterback entering the 2025 season.

Gronowski was selected to play in the 2026 East–West Shrine Bowl, and was selected as that year's offensive MVP.

=== Statistics ===
Legend
	FCS/NCAA record
	Led the FCS
**Bold**	Career high

Season	Team	Games			Passing								Rushing			
Season	Team	GP	GS	Record	Cmp	Att	Pct	Yds	Y/A	TD	Int	Rtg	Att	Yds	Avg	TD
2020	South Dakota State	10	10	8–2	108	188	57.7	1,565	8.3	15	3	151.1	83	**577**	**7.0**	7
2021	South Dakota State	0	0	—	DNP (Injury-ACL)											
2022	South Dakota State	**15**	**15**	14–1	**232**	**356**	65.2	2,967	8.3	26	5	156.5	111	408	3.7	12
2023	South Dakota State	**15**	**15**	**15–0**	209	307	**68.8**	**3,058**	**9.9**	**29**	5	**179.7**	93	402	4.3	8
2024	South Dakota State	**15**	**15**	12–3	206	338	60.9	2,721	8.1	23	**7**	146.9	98	380	3.9	10
2025	Iowa	13	13	9–4	166	262	63.4	1,741	6.6	10	7	126.4	**130**	545	4.2	**16**
FCS career		55	55	49−6	755	1,188	63.6	10,308	8.7	93	20	158.9	385	1,767	4.6	37
FBS career		13	13	9−4	166	262	63.4	1,741	6.6	10	7	126.4	130	545	4.2	16
Career		68	68	58−10	922	1,450	63.6	12,049	8.3	103	27	152.8	515	2,312	4.5	53

== Professional career ==
Pre-draft measurables
Height	Weight	Arm length	Hand span	Wingspan	40-yard dash	10-yard split	20-yard split	20-yard shuttle	Three-cone drill	Vertical jump	Broad jump
6 ft 2 1/8 in (1.88 m)	226 lb (103 kg)	32 3/8 in (0.82 m)	10 1/2 in (0.27 m)	6 ft 5 3/4 in (1.97 m)	4.71 s	1.60 s	2.68 s	4.29 s	7.00 s	39.0 in (0.99 m)	9 ft 8 in (2.95 m)
All values from Pro Day

=== Miami Dolphins ===
Gronowski signed with the Miami Dolphins as an undrafted free agent on May 8, 2026. He was waived by the Dolphins on August 7. Gronowski subsequently re–signed with Miami on August 16. On August 30, Gronowski was waived by Miami as a part of final roster cuts; he was re-signed to the team's practice squad the following day. On September 1, Gronowski was released by the Dolphins.

=== Houston Texans ===
On September 8, 2026, Gronowski was signed to the Houston Texans' practice squad. On September 17, he was released by the Texans. On October 7, Gronowski was signed to the active roster, waived three days later and re-signed to the practice squad on October 14. He was released on October 20.

== Personal life ==
Gronowski's father, Ray Gronowski, played quarterback at Drake University. His older sister Sarah played softball at Butler.
