= Dakota Marker =

College football rivalry, North Dakota State–South Dakota State

- North Dakota State Bison South Dakota State Jackrabbits
- Sport: Football
- First meeting: November 30, 1903; North Dakota Agricultural 85, SDSU 0
- Latest meeting: October 25, 2025; NDSU 38, SDSU 7
- Trophy: Dakota Marker

Statistics
- Total meetings: 118
- All-time series: North Dakota State leads, 66–47–5
- Trophy series: North Dakota State leads, 12–10
- Largest victory: North Dakota State, 85–0 (1903)
- Longest win streak: North Dakota State, 17 (1976–92)
- Current win streak: North Dakota State, 3 (2024–present)

Locations of South Dakota State and North Dakota State

The Dakota Marker is the trophy awarded to the winner of the annual football game played between the rival North Dakota State University Bison and the South Dakota State University Jackrabbits. With North Dakota State's move to the Football Bowl Subdivision (FBS) and the Mountain West Conference, the rivalry's future is uncertain, although a future revival is possible with South Dakota State's potential candidacy for the Mountain West or other conferences in the FBS.

== The Marker ==
The trophy is a model replica of the quartzite monuments that marked the border between North and South Dakota when Dakota Territory split into two states along the Seventh Standard Parallel (45°56'07" N). The monuments were seven feet tall and ten inches square at the top, and were mined and inscribed near Sioux Falls. Charles Bates placed 720 markers at half-mile intervals along the border in the summers of 1891 and 1892. The monuments inscribed with the initials "N.D." on the north side and "S.D." on the south side.

Dakota Marker
- Awarded for: Winning the annual NDSU/SDSU regular season football game
- Sponsored by: NDSU Chapter Blue Key National Honor Society & SDSU Student Association
- Location: Fargo, ND or Brookings, SD
- Country: United States
- First award: 2004
- Currently held by: North Dakota State

Adam Jones, then-President of the NDSU Chapter of Blue Key National Honor Society, proposed the trophy itself and unveiled it to the public on April 21, 2004 at a ceremony just outside Hankinson, North Dakota, a community near the North Dakota/South Dakota border.

The inscriptions include: N.D., S.D., and 190 M (the distance between Fargo, ND and Brookings, SD along Interstate 29). The trophy weighs nearly 75 pounds and is commonly carried around the field immediately after the game's conclusion by the winning team.

== Rivalry history ==
North Dakota State and South Dakota State regularly played each other for several decades as members of the Division II North Central Conference. In 2004, the move by both schools to Division I FCS prompted the creation of the trophy, as both schools lost their primary in-state rivals (North Dakota for the Bison and South Dakota for the Jackrabbits) who both remained in Division II at the time. Both teams became members of the newly formed Great West Football Conference, and the annual Marker game took on more importance from a regional bragging rights standpoint as the "closest neighbor" football rivalry. The series continued when both teams joined the Missouri Valley Football Conference in 2008. The series often proves decisive in determining the Missouri Valley conference championship winner each season and both teams have been regular playoff participants at the FCS level.

In addition to the regular season game played for the Marker each year, the two teams have met six times in FCS playoff games, with the Bison holding a 5–1 lead against the Jackrabbits in the postseason. Five of these games were played in Fargo as playoff matches, all of which resulted in victories by North Dakota State; who would later go on to win the championship in all of those seasons. However, in their first ever meeting in the NCAA Division I Football Championship game in Frisco, South Dakota State defeated the Bison in the 2023 NCAA Division I Football Championship Game with a score of 45–21, earning the Jackrabbits their first FCS championship as well as their sole postseason win against North Dakota State.

The Dakota Marker series currently stands in favor of North Dakota State at 12–10. The Bison are currently in possession of the trophy after winning the latest game in the regular season series, a 38–7 victory in Brookings on October 25, 2025. The 2019 Marker game in Brookings was notable for the visit of College GameDay, the flagship college football pregame show broadcast by ESPN. The show originated live from the South Dakota State campus on the morning of the game as the Bison entered the contest ranked No. 1 in FCS and undefeated at 7–0, with the Jackrabbits ranked No. 3 and coming in at 6–1. The home team has won twelve of the last nineteen Marker games since the inception of the series.

The two teams have now met 117 times in their history, and the Bison lead the overall series 65–47, with five ties. Their 100th meeting was the first time they met in the playoffs (2012), with the Bison claiming a 28–3 victory.

After North Dakota State's announcement in February 2026 that they would play in the Mountain West Conference of the Football Bowl Subdivision (FBS) starting with the 2026 season, the rivalry's future is uncertain. At the very least, the series will no longer be a yearly occurrence and would only be played in Fargo.

== Game results ==
North Dakota State victories	South Dakota State victories	Tie games

No.	Date	Location	Winner	Score
1	October 19, 1903	Fargo, ND	North Dakota Agricultural	85–0
2	October 23, 1908	Fargo, ND	South Dakota State	11–5
3	October 22, 1909	Brookings, SD	North Dakota Agricultural	11–5
4	October 21, 1910	Fargo, ND	South Dakota State	6–3
5	October 28, 1911	Brookings, SD	South Dakota State	14–3
6	October 18, 1913	Sioux Falls, SD	South Dakota State	7–6
7	November 13, 1915	Watertown, SD	South Dakota State	21–0
8	November 16, 1917	Brookings, SD	South Dakota State	21–14
9	October 25, 1919	Fargo, ND	Tie	0–0
10	October 23, 1920	Brookings, SD	South Dakota State	28–7
11	October 22, 1921	Fargo, ND	South Dakota State	54–0
12	November 11, 1922	Brookings, SD	South Dakota State	13–0
13	October 13, 1923	Fargo, ND	North Dakota Agricultural	14–13
14	October 4, 1924	Brookings, SD	South Dakota State	14–0
15	October 17, 1925	Brookings, SD	Tie	3–3
16	October 16, 1926	Brookings, SD	South Dakota State	21–0
17	October 15, 1927	Fargo, ND	South Dakota State	33–0
18	November 10, 1928	Brookings, SD	South Dakota State	27–6
19	October 19, 1929	Fargo, ND	Tie	0–0
20	November 15, 1930	Brookings, SD	North Dakota Agricultural	24–0
21	October 24, 1931	Fargo, ND	South Dakota State	7–0
22	October 8, 1932	Brookings, SD	North Dakota Agricultural	12–6
23	October 14, 1933	Fargo, ND	South Dakota State	13–7
24	November 10, 1934	Brookings, SD	South Dakota State	38–0
25	October 12, 1935	Fargo, ND	North Dakota Agricultural	7–6
26	November 14, 1936	Sioux Falls, SD	North Dakota Agricultural	7–0
27	October 9, 1937	Fargo, ND	South Dakota State	13–6
28	November 12, 1938	Brookings, SD	North Dakota Agricultural	13–6
29	October 14, 1939	Fargo, ND	South Dakota State	6–0
30	November 1, 1940	Brookings, SD	South Dakota State	7–0
31	October 11, 1941	Fargo, ND	North Dakota Agricultural	25–0
32	October 31, 1942	Brookings, SD	South Dakota State	14–0
33	October 12, 1946	Fargo, ND	North Dakota Agricultural	6–0
34	November 1, 1947	Brookings, SD	South Dakota State	7–0
35	October 16, 1948	Fargo, ND	South Dakota State	7–6
36	November 4, 1949	Brookings, SD	South Dakota State	33–13
37	October 14, 1950	Fargo, ND	South Dakota State	60–0
38	October 20, 1951	Brookings, SD	Tie	7–7
39	October 11, 1952	Fargo, ND	North Dakota Agricultural	48–14
40	October 24, 1953	Brookings, SD	South Dakota State	32–14
41	October 16, 1954	Fargo, ND	South Dakota State	50–13
42	October 22, 1955	Brookings, SD	South Dakota State	33–7
43	October 27, 1956	Fargo, ND	North Dakota Agricultural	26–9
44	October 26, 1957	Brookings, SD	South Dakota State	32–14
45	October 25, 1958	Fargo, ND	North Dakota Agricultural	33–20
46	October 24, 1959	Brookings, SD	North Dakota Agricultural	8–6
47	October 22, 1960	Fargo, ND	Tie	14–14
48	October 28, 1961	Brookings, SD	South Dakota State	41–12
49	October 27, 1962	Fargo, ND	South Dakota State	17–6
50	October 26, 1963	Brookings, SD	South Dakota State	40–25
51	October 3, 1964	Fargo, ND	North Dakota State	20–13
52	October 2, 1965	Brookings, SD	North Dakota State	41–13
53	October 1, 1966	Fargo, ND	North Dakota State	35–6
54	September 30, 1967	Brookings, SD	North Dakota State	34–14
55	September 21, 1968	Fargo, ND	North Dakota State	21–3
56	November 8, 1969	Brookings, SD	North Dakota State	20–13
57	October 31, 1970	Fargo, ND	North Dakota State	35–0
58	October 30, 1971	Brookings, SD	South Dakota State	20–13
59	October 28, 1972	Fargo, ND	North Dakota State	34–16
60	October 27, 1973	Brookings, SD	North Dakota State	24–14

No.	Date	Location	Winner	Score
61	October 5, 1974	Fargo, ND	North Dakota State	28–0
62	October 4, 1975	Brookings, SD	South Dakota State	13–8
63	October 2, 1976	Fargo, ND	North Dakota State	13–0
64	October 1, 1977	Brookings, SD	North Dakota State	27–14
65	November 4, 1978	Brookings, SD	North Dakota State	28–26
66	October 27, 1979	Fargo, ND	North Dakota State	38–14
67	October 18, 1980	Brookings, SD	North Dakota State	23–16
68	October 10, 1981	Fargo, ND	North Dakota State	48–24
69	October 2, 1982	Brookings, SD	North Dakota State	10–3
70	October 15, 1983	Brookings, SD	North Dakota State	24–12
71	October 13, 1984	Fargo, ND	North Dakota State	55–30
72	October 12, 1985	Fargo, ND	North Dakota State	41–7
73	October 11, 1986	Brookings, SD	North Dakota State	49–7
74	September 19, 1987	Fargo, ND	North Dakota State	43–7
75	September 17, 1988	Brookings, SD	North Dakota State	55–26
76	September 23, 1989	Brookings, SD	North Dakota State	33–12
77	September 22, 1990	Fargo, ND	North Dakota State	40–28
78	September 28, 1991	Brookings, SD	North Dakota State	35–0
79	September 26, 1992	Fargo, ND	North Dakota State	47–10
80	October 9, 1993	Brookings, SD	South Dakota State	42–30
81	October 8, 1994	Fargo, ND	North Dakota State	52–39
82	October 14, 1995	Brookings, SD	North Dakota State	26–17
83	October 19, 1996	Fargo, ND	North Dakota State	31–7
84	October 25, 1997	Brookings, SD	South Dakota State	34–27
85	October 24, 1998	Fargo, ND	North Dakota State	35–32
86	October 16, 1999	Brookings, SD	North Dakota State	28–7
87	October 14, 2000	Fargo, ND	North Dakota State	21–3
88	October 20, 2001	Fargo, ND	North Dakota State	45–38
89	October 26, 2002	Brookings, SD	South Dakota State	25–20
90	September 27, 2003	Fargo, ND	North Dakota State	24–0
91	October 9, 2004	Brookings, SD	South Dakota State	24–21
92	November 12, 2005	Fargo, ND	#22 North Dakota State	41–17
93	November 18, 2006	Fargo, ND	#4 North Dakota State	41–28
94	November 17, 2007	Brookings, SD	South Dakota State	29–24
95	November 22, 2008	Fargo, ND	South Dakota State	25–24
96	October 17, 2009	Brookings, SD	#14 South Dakota State	28–13
97	November 13, 2010	Fargo, ND	#24 North Dakota State	31–24
98	October 22, 2011	Brookings, SD	#3 North Dakota State	38–14
99	November 10, 2012	Fargo, ND	#1 North Dakota State	20–17
100	December 1, 2012^	Fargo, ND	#1 North Dakota State	28–3
101	September 28, 2013	Brookings, SD	#1 North Dakota State	20–0
102	November 1, 2014	Fargo, ND	#1 North Dakota State	37–17
103	December 6, 2014^	Fargo, ND	#2 North Dakota State	27–24
104	October 3, 2015	Brookings, SD	#3 North Dakota State	28–7
105	October 15, 2016	Fargo, ND	#11 South Dakota State	19–17
106	December 10, 2016^	Fargo, ND	#4 North Dakota State	36–10
107	November 4, 2017	Brookings, SD	#8 South Dakota State	33–21
108	September 29, 2018	Fargo, ND	#1 North Dakota State	21–17
109	December 14, 2018^	Fargo, ND	#1 North Dakota State	44–21
110	October 26, 2019	Brookings, SD	#1 North Dakota State	23–16
111	April 17, 2021	Fargo, ND	#4 South Dakota State	27–17
112	November 6, 2021	Brookings, SD	#9 South Dakota State	27–19
113	October 15, 2022	Fargo, ND	#2 South Dakota State	23–21
114	January 8, 2023^	Frisco, TX	#1 South Dakota State	45–21
115	November 4, 2023	Brookings, SD	#1 South Dakota State	33–16
116	October 19, 2024	Fargo, ND	#2 North Dakota State	13–9
117	December 21, 2024^	Fargo, ND	#3 North Dakota State	28–21
118	October 25, 2025	Brookings, SD	#1 North Dakota State	38–7
Series: North Dakota State leads 66–47–5

^The Marker was not at stake in these six games, as they were playoff games.

== See also ==
- List of NCAA college football rivalry games
- List of most-played college football series in NCAA Division I
