= John Stiegelmeier =

American football coach

Biographical details
- Born: February 7, 1957 (age 69); Selby, South Dakota, U.S.
- Education: South Dakota State

Coaching career (HC unless noted)
- 1979: South Dakota State (SA)
- 1980: Northern Iowa (assistant)
- 1981–1983: North HS (WI) (assistant)
- 1984–1987: Northern State (DC/DB/RC)
- 1988–1990: South Dakota State (DB/RC)
- 1991–1997: South Dakota State (DC)
- 1997–2022: South Dakota State

Head coaching record
- Overall: 199–112 (college)
- Tournaments: 18–11 (NCAA D-I playoffs)

Accomplishments and honors

Championships
- 1 NCAA Division I FCS (2022); 1 GWC (2007); 3 MVFC (2016, 2020, 2022)

Awards
- Eddie Robinson Award (2022)

John Stiegelmeier (born February 7, 1957) is an American former football coach. He served as the head football coach at South Dakota State University from 1997 to 2022, compiling a record of 199–112. In his final season, he led the 2022 South Dakota State Jackrabbits football team to the NCAA Division I Football Championship title, the first national title in South Dakota State Jackrabbits football program history.

== Coaching career ==
Stiegelmeier was hired as the 20th head coach of the South Dakota State Jackrabbits football program in 1997. In 1999, Stiegelmeier was named the North Central Conference Coach of the Year after finishing the season with an 8–3 overall record. Stiegelmeier was also honored as the Great West Football Conference Coach of the Year in 2007 after compiling a 7–4 overall record and winning the GWFC title. He was also named by the American Football Coaches Association as the 2007 NCAA Division I Football Championship Subdivision Region 5 Coach of the Year along with being named one of the five finalists for the 2007 Liberty Mutual Coach of the Year Award. Stiegelmeier was also a finalist in 2009. Stiegelmeier was the recipient of the 2022 Eddie Robinson Award.

After 26 seasons, John Stiegelmeier, one of the most accomplished coaches in FCS football, announced his retirement on Thursday January 19, 2023. Stiegelmeier exited on top, as South Dakota State won the school's first-ever national title in Stiegelmeier's 26th and final season as head coach.

Overall, Stiegelmeier led the Jackrabbits to a 199-112 record (.640 winning percentage) in 26 seasons. With Coach "Stig" as the head coach, took SDSU to the FCS playoffs 12 times (2009, 2012, 2013, 2014, 2015, 2016, 2017, 2018, 2019, 2020–21, 2021, 2022) and is one of only two FCS programs to reach the postseason each of the past 11 seasons. SDSU won playoffs in nine of playoff seasons and finished in the top 25 of both major FCS polls in 14 of the last 17 years, including a No. 1 ranking at the end of the 2022 season.

South Dakota State reached the Football Championship Subdivision during the 2022 season. Following a season-opening, 7-3 loss at Iowa, SDSU won a school-record 14 consecutive games, as well as a 8-0 mark against Missouri Valley Football Conference. Stiegelmeier won the 2022 Eddie Robinson Award

He was replaced as head coach by defensive coordinator Jimmy Rogers.

== Head coaching record ==
=== College ===
Year	Team	Overall	Conference	Standing	Bowl/playoffs	Coaches^{#}	TSN/STATS^{°}
South Dakota State Jackrabbits (North Central Conference) (1997–2003)
1997	South Dakota State	4–6	3–6	T–6th			
1998	South Dakota State	6–5	5–4	5th			
1999	South Dakota State	8–3	6–3	4th			
2000	South Dakota State	6–5	4–5	6th			
2001	South Dakota State	5–6	4–4	T–4th			
2002	South Dakota State	6–4	4–4	T–4th			
2003	South Dakota State	7–4	4–3	T–4th			
South Dakota State Jackrabbits (Great West Conference) (2004–2007)
2004	South Dakota State	6–5	2–3	T–3rd			
2005	South Dakota State	6–5	3–2	T–3rd			
2006	South Dakota State	7–4	3–1	2nd			22
2007	South Dakota State	7–4	4–0	1st		22	19
South Dakota State Jackrabbits (Missouri Valley Football Conference) (2008–2022)
2008	South Dakota State	7–5	6–2	3rd			
2009	South Dakota State	8–4	7–1	2nd	L NCAA Division I First Round	11	11
2010	South Dakota State	5–6	4–4	T–3rd			
2011	South Dakota State	5–6	4–4	T–4th			
2012	South Dakota State	9–4	6–2	2nd	L NCAA Division I Second Round	17	14
2013	South Dakota State	9–5	5–3	T–2nd	L NCAA Division I Second Round	14	13
2014	South Dakota State	9–5	5–3	4th	L NCAA Division I Second Round	13	12
2015	South Dakota State	8–4	5–3	T–3rd	L NCAA Division I First Round	16	15
2016	South Dakota State	9–4	7–1	T–1st	L NCAA Division I Quarterfinal	7	6
2017	South Dakota State	11–3	6–2	T–2nd	L NCAA Division I Semifinal	4	3
2018	South Dakota State	10–3	6–2	2nd	L NCAA Division I Semifinal	3	3
2019	South Dakota State	8–5	5–3	T–3rd	L NCAA Division I Second Round	12	10
2020–21	South Dakota State	8–2	5–1	T–1st	L NCAA Division I Championship	2	2
2021	South Dakota State	11–4	5–3	T–3rd	L NCAA Division I Semifinal	5	4
2022	South Dakota State	14–1	8–0	1st	W NCAA Division I Championship	1	1
South Dakota State:		199–112	128–70				
Total:		199–112					
National championship Conference title Conference division title or championship game berth
