= 2023 NCAA Division I Football Championship Game =

Postseason college football game

2023 NCAA Division I Football Championship
- FCS National Championship Game
| North Dakota State Bison | South Dakota State Jackrabbits |
| (12–2) | (13–1) |
| Missouri Valley | Missouri Valley |
| 21 | 45 |
| Head coach: Matt Entz | Head coach: John Stiegelmeier |
| STATS / Seed; 4 / 3 | STATS / Seed; 1 / 1 |
| | 1 | 2 | 3 | 4 | Total |
|---|---|---|---|---|---|
| North Dakota State | 7 | 7 | 0 | 7 | 21 |
| South Dakota State | 7 | 24 | 7 | 7 | 45 |
- Date: January 8, 2023
- Season: 2022
- Stadium: Toyota Stadium
- Location: Frisco, Texas
- MVP: Mark Gronowski (QB, South Dakota State)
- Favorite: South Dakota State by 4
- Referee: Jeff Page
- Attendance: 18,023

United States TV coverage
- Network: ABC, ESPN+
- Announcers: Roy Philpott, Jay Walker and Paul Carcaterra

The 2023 NCAA Division I Football Championship Game was a college football game played on January 8, 2023, at Toyota Stadium in Frisco, Texas. The game determined the national champion of NCAA Division I FCS for the 2022 season, featuring the finalists of the 24-team playoff bracket, which began on November 26, 2022.

Top-ranked South Dakota State defeated conference rival North Dakota State 45–21 to gain their first national championship. Played on Sunday for the first time, the game began at 1:04 p.m. CST and was broadcast on ABC and ESPN+, opposite NFL regular season finales (week 18).

== Teams ==
The participants were rivals North Dakota State and South Dakota State of the Missouri Valley Football Conference. Both teams advanced through the FCS playoff bracket to reach the championship game.

Entering the game, North Dakota State led the all-time series 63–45–5 (.580), although South Dakota State had won their last three meetings, lasting back to the 2021 spring season. North Dakota State was 4–0 against South Dakota State in prior FCS playoff games; this was their first meeting in the FCS title game.

=== North Dakota State ===
North Dakota State played to a 9–2 regular-season record, suffering losses to Arizona (an FBS program) and South Dakota State. Seeded No. 3 in the FCS playoffs, the Bison received a first-round bye, then defeated Montana, Samford, and Incarnate Word to advance to the championship game.

=== South Dakota State ===
South Dakota State played to a 10–1 regular-season record; their only loss was to Iowa (an FBS program). Seeded No. 1 in the FCS playoffs, the Jackrabbits received a first-round bye, then defeated Delaware, Holy Cross, and Montana State to advance to the championship game.

== Game summary ==
2023 NCAA Division I Football Championship Game

| Quarter | 1 | 2 | 3 | 4 | Total |
|---|---|---|---|---|---|
| No. 3 North Dakota State | 7 | 7 | 0 | 7 | 21 |
| No. 1 South Dakota State | 7 | 24 | 7 | 7 | 45 |

at Toyota Stadium • Frisco, Texas

- Date: January 8, 2023
- Game time: 1:00 p.m. CST
- Game weather: Sunny • Temperature: 56 °F (13 °C) • Wind: 5 mph (8.0 km/h) north
- Game attendance: 18,023
- Referee: Jeff Page
- TV announcers (ABC, ESPN+): Roy Philpott, Jay Walker and Paul Carcaterra
- Box score

Scoring summary

| Quarter | Time | Drive | | | Team | Scoring information | Score | |
| Quarter | Time | Plays | Yards | TOP | Team | Scoring information | North Dakota State | South Dakota State |
|---|---|---|---|---|---|---|---|---|
| 1 | 9:12 | 9 | 85 | 4:04 | SDSU | Isaiah Davis 16-yard touchdown run, Hunter Dustman kick good | 0 | 7 |
| 1 | 6:31 | 6 | 75 | 2:41 | NDSU | Joe Stoffel 27-yard touchdown reception from Cam Miller, Griffin Crosa kick good | 7 | 7 |
| 2 | 12:50 | 8 | 77 | 4:37 | SDSU | Amar Johnson 32-yard touchdown run, Hunter Dustman kick good | 7 | 14 |
| 2 | 11:03 | 4 | 34 | 1:31 | SDSU | Jaxon Janke 18-yard touchdown reception from Mark Gronowski, Hunter Dustman kick good | 7 | 21 |
| 2 | 3:30 | 9 | 84 | 4:17 | SDSU | Michael Morgan 44-yard touchdown reception from Mark Gronowski, Hunter Dustman kick good | 7 | 28 |
| 2 | 2:03 | 4 | 65 | 1:27 | NDSU | Eli Green 44-yard touchdown reception from Cam Miller, Griffin Crosa kick good | 14 | 28 |
| 2 | 0:00 | 6 | 62 | 2:03 | SDSU | 30-yard field goal by Hunter Dustman | 14 | 31 |
| 3 | 13:13 | 3 | 74 | 1:47 | SDSU | Mark Gronowski 51-yard touchdown run, Hunter Dustman kick good | 14 | 38 |
| 4 | 13:44 | 16 | 99 | 7:51 | NDSU | Kobe Johnson 9-yard touchdown run, Griffin Crosa kick good | 21 | 38 |
| 4 | 8:05 | 4 | 42 | 2:35 | SDSU | Jaxon Janke 30-yard touchdown reception from Mark Gronowski, Hunter Dustman kick good | 21 | 45 |
| "TOP" = time of possession. For other American football terms, see Glossary of American football. | | | | | | | 21 | 45 |

== Statistics ==
Team statistical comparison
| Statistic | North Dakota State | South Dakota State |
|---|---|---|
| First downs | 21 | 22 |
| First downs rushing | 11 | 10 |
| First downs passing | 10 | 12 |
| First downs penalty | 0 | 0 |
| Third down efficiency | 5–12 | 9–14 |
| Fourth down efficiency | 1–3 | 0–0 |
| Total plays–net yards | 66–420 | 60–522 |
| Rushing attempts–net yards | 37–160 | 39–299 |
| Yards per rush | 4.3 | 7.7 |
| Yards passing | 260 | 223 |
| Pass completions–attempts (percent) | 18–29 (62%) | 14–21 (67%) |
| Interceptions thrown | 2 | 0 |
| Punt returns–total yards | 1–(-3) | 1–0 |
| Kickoff returns–total yards | 2–55 | 2–26 |
| Punts–average yardage | 4–45.0 | 4–53.3 |
| Fumbles–lost | 1–1 | 0–0 |
| Penalties–yards | 2–25 | 3–20 |
| Time of possession | 28:00 | 32:00 |

North Dakota State statistics
Bison passing
| | C–A | Yds | TD–INT |
|---|---|---|---|
| Cam Miller | 18–29 | 260 | 2–2 |
Bison rushing
| | Car | Yds | TD |
| Cam Miller | 11 | 64 | 0 |
| Kobe Johnson | 11 | 63 | 1 |
| TaMerik Williams | 7 | 23 | 0 |
| TK Marshall | 4 | 13 | 0 |
| Cole Payton | 1 | 6 | 0 |
| Eli Green | 1 | -9 | 0 |
Bison receiving
| | Rec | Yds | TD |
| Zach Mathis | 7 | 123 | 0 |
| Eli Green | 1 | 44 | 1 |
| Joe Stoffel | 3 | 41 | 1 |
| Jake Lippe | 2 | 26 | 0 |
| TaMerik Williams | 2 | 11 | 0 |
| TK Marshall | 2 | 11 | 0 |
| Kobe Johnson | 1 | 4 | 0 |

South Dakota State statistics
Jackrabbits passing
| | C–A | Yds | TD–INT |
|---|---|---|---|
| Mark Gronowski | 14–21 | 223 | 3–0 |
Jackrabbits rushing
| | Car | Yds | TD |
| Amar Johnson | 9 | 126 | 1 |
| Isaiah Davis | 22 | 103 | 1 |
| Mark Gronowski | 5 | 57 | 1 |
| Team | 1 | -1 | 0 |
| Angel Johnson | 1 | -2 | 0 |
Jackrabbits receiving
| | Rec | Yds | TD |
| Jadon Janke | 5 | 61 | 0 |
| Jaxon Janke | 3 | 60 | 2 |
| Michael Morgan | 1 | 44 | 1 |
| Tucker Kraft | 2 | 30 | 0 |
| Isaiah Davis | 2 | 28 | 0 |
| Amar Johnson | 1 | 0 | 0 |
