= 2022 Missouri Valley Football Conference season =

American college football season

- League: NCAA Division I Football Championship Subdivision
- Sport: Football
- Duration: September 1, 2022 through January 8, 2023
- Teams: 11

2023 NFL draft
- Top draft pick: Cody Mauch, OT, North Dakota State
- Picked by: Tampa Bay Buccaneers (round 2, pick 48)

Regular season
- Champion Playoff Participants: South Dakota State North Dakota State; North Dakota

Football seasons
- 2021 2023

2022 Missouri Valley Football Conference standings
	Conf.			Overall
Team	W		L	W		L
No. 1 South Dakota State $^	8	–	0	14	–	1
No. 2 North Dakota State ^	7	–	1	12	–	3
No. 20 North Dakota ^	5	–	3	7	–	5
Youngstown State	5	–	3	7	–	4
Northern Iowa	5	–	3	6	–	5
Illinois State	4	–	4	6	–	5
Southern Illinois	4	–	4	5	–	6
Missouri State	3	–	5	5	–	6
South Dakota	2	–	6	3	–	8
Indiana State	1	–	7	2	–	9
Western Illinois	0	–	8	0	–	11
$ – Conference champion; ^ – FCS playoff participant; Rankings from STATS Poll

The 2022 Missouri Valley Football Conference football season was the 37th season of college football play for the Missouri Valley Football Conference and part of the 2022 NCAA Division I FCS football season. This was the MVFC's 3rd straight season with 11 teams, and was the last as the conference added a 12th team for the 2023 season.

South Dakota State and North Dakota State met in the National Championship Game after winning all three of their home playoff games. It was only the second time in FCS history and MVFC history that the final game was played between two same-conference teams, the last one pitting North Dakota State and Illinois State against each other in 2015. The Jackrabbits would go on to win their first National Title, 45-21.

== Coaching changes ==
=== Western Illinois ===
On December 17, 2021, Myers Hendrickson was named the new head coach at Western Illinois. Hendrickson played for the Leathernecks in his brief college career as a wide receiver from 2008-10. He replaces coach Jared Elliot who led the program since 2018.

== Preseason ==
=== MVFC Media Day ===
==== Preseason Poll ====
The annual preseason poll; voted on by conference coaches, athletic directors, and media members.

Predicted finish	Team	Points (1st place votes)
1	North Dakota State	446 (39)
2	South Dakota State	407 (2)
3	Missouri State	355
4	Southern Illinois	306
5	Northern Iowa	304
6	South Dakota	235
7	North Dakota	190
8	Illinois State	178
9	Youngstown State	132
10	Indiana State	109
11	Western Illinois	44

=== Preseason Awards ===
==== Individual awards ====
Award	Player	School	Position	Year
First Team Offense	Jason Shelley	Missouri State	QB	Sr.
First Team Offense	Isaiah Davis	South Dakota State	RB	Jr.
First Team Offense	Jaleel McLaughlin	Youngstown State	RB	Sr.
First Team Offense	Javon Williams	Southern Illinois	RB/AP	Jr.
First Team Offense	Hunter Luepke	North Dakota State	FB	Sr.
First Team Offense	Avante Cox	Southern Illinois	WR	Sr.
First Team Offense	Jaxon Janke	South Dakota State	WR	Sr.
First Team Offense	Tyrone Scott	Missouri State	WR	Jr.
First Team Offense	Tucker Kraft	South Dakota State	TE	Jr.
First Team Offense	Landon Bebee	Missouri State	OL	Jr.
First Team Offense	Garret Greenfield	South Dakota State	OL	Sr.
First Team Offense	Cody Mauch	North Dakota State	OL	Sr.
First Team Offense	Mason McCormick	South Dakota State	OL	Sr.
First Team Offense	Alex Jensen	South Dakota	OL	Sr.
First Team Defense	Kevin Ellis	Missouri State	DL	Sr.
First Team Defense	Eli Mostaert	North Dakota State	DL	Sr.
First Team Defense	Caleb Sanders	South Dakota State	DL	Sr.
First Team Defense	Reece Winkelman	South Dakota State	DL	Sr.
First Team Defense	Adam Bock	South Dakota State	LB	Jr.
First Team Defense	Spencer Cuvelier	Northern Iowa	LB	RS Sr.
First Team Defense	Brock Mogensen	South Dakota	LB	Jr.
First Team Defense	Zeke Vandenburgh	Illinois State	LB	Sr.
First Team Defense	Montrae Braswell	Missouri State	DB	Jr.
First Team Defense	PJ Jules	Southern Illinois	DB	Jr.
First Team Defense	Kyriq McDonald	Missouri State	DB	Sr.
First Team Defense	Benny Sapp III	Northern Iowa	DB	Sr.
First Team Defense	Michael Tutsie	North Dakota State	DB	Sr.
First Team Special Teams	Dalton Godfrey	South Dakota	LS	Sr.
First Team Special Teams	Matthew Cook	Northern Iowa	PK	Jr.
First Team Special Teams	Grant Burkett	Missouri State	P	So.
First Team Special Teams	Montrae Braswell	Missouri State	RS	Jr.
First Team Special Teams	Carter Bell	South Dakota	AP	So.
Second Team Offense	Mark Gronowski	South Dakota State	QB	So.
Second Team Offense	Kobe Johnson	North Dakota State	RB	Sr.
Second Team Offense	Cole Mueller	Illinois State	RB	So.
Second Team Offense	Jacob Garrett	Southern Illinois	FB	Jr.
Second Team Offense	Carter Bell	South Dakota	WR	So.
Second Team Offense	Bo Belquist	North Dakota	WR	Jr.
Second Team Offense	Dante Hendrix	Indiana State	WR	RS Sr.
Second Team Offense	Noah Gindorff	North Dakota State	TE	Sr.
Second Team Offense	Drew Bones	Illinois State	OL	Sr.
Second Team Offense	Nash Jensen	North Dakota State	OL	Sr.
Second Team Offense	Erik Sorensen	Northern Iowa	OL	RS Sr.
Second Team Offense	Donny Ventrelli	North Dakota	OL	Sr.
Second Team Offense	Jaison Williams	Youngstown State	OL	So.
Second Team Defense	Braydon Deming	Illinois State	DL	Sr.
Second Team Defense	Nick Gaes	South Dakota	DL	So.
Second Team Defense	Caden Houghtelling	Northern Iowa	DL	RS Jr.
Second Team Defense	Devin Rice	Northern Iowa	OL	RS Jr.
Second Team Defense	Spencer Waege	North Dakota State	DL	Sr.
Second Team Defense	Greg Benton Jr.	Youngstown State	LB	Sr.
Second Team Defense	Bryce Flater	Northern Iowa	LB	RS Sr.
Second Team Defense	James Kaczor	North Dakota State	LB	Sr.
Second Team Defense	Devon Krzanowski	North Dakota	LB	Sr.
Second Team Defense	Clayton Bush	Southern Illinois	DB	Jr.
Second Team Defense	Korby Sander	Northern Iowa	DB	Fr.
Second Team Defense	C.J. Siegel	North Dakota	CB	Sr.
Second Team Defense	Destin Talbert	North Dakota State	DB	Sr.
Second Team Defense	Dawson Weber	North Dakota State	DB	Sr.
Second Team Special Teams	Joey Malinowski	Illinois State	LS	Jr.
Second Team Special Teams	Jose Pizano	Missouri State	PK	Jr.
Second Team Special Teams	Cade Peterson	North Dakota	P	Sr.
Second Team Special Teams	Jayden Price	North Dakota State	RS	Sr.
Second Team Special Teams	Quan Hampton	Northern Iowa	AP/WR	Sr.

== Rankings ==
Legend
	Improvement in ranking
	Drop in ranking
	Not ranked previous week
	No change in ranking from previous week
RV	Received votes but were not ranked in Top 25 of poll
т	Tied with team above or below also with this symbol

		Pre	Wk 1	Wk 2	Wk 3	Wk 4	Wk 5	Wk 6	Wk 7	Wk 8	Wk 9	Wk 10	Wk 11	Wk 12	Final
Illinois State	STATS Perform							RV	RV	RV					
Illinois State	AFCA Coaches		RV	RV					RV	RV					
Indiana State	STATS Perform														
Indiana State	AFCA Coaches														
Missouri State	STATS Perform	5	5	5	6	7	20	RV	RV						
Missouri State	AFCA Coaches	8	7	4т	9	19	RV	RV							
North Dakota	STATS Perform		RV	22	19	RV	22	20	20	23	21	19	16	20	20
North Dakota	AFCA Coaches	RV	RV	RV	RV		RV	RV	RV	RV	RV	RV	23	24т	RV
North Dakota State	STATS Perform	1	1	1	1	1	1	1	4	4	4	4	4	4	2
North Dakota State	AFCA Coaches	1	1	1	1	1	1	1	4	4	4	4	4	4	2
Northern Iowa	STATS Perform	21	24	RV							RV				
Northern Iowa	AFCA Coaches	21	24								RV				
South Dakota	STATS Perform			RV	RV		RV								
South Dakota	AFCA Coaches	RV	RV												
South Dakota State	STATS Perform	2	2	2	2т	2	2	2	1	1	1	1	1	1	1
South Dakota State	AFCA Coaches	3	3	3	3	3	3	3	1	1	1	1	1	1	1
Southern Illinois	STATS Perform	9	17	RV	24	19	17	16	14	20	RV	RV			
Southern Illinois	AFCA Coaches	9	19	RV	RV	RV	24	19	17	24	RV	RV			
Western Illinois	STATS Perform														
Western Illinois	AFCA Coaches														
Youngstown State	STATS Perform			RV	RV	RV						RV		RV	RV
Youngstown State	AFCA Coaches		RV	23	25т	RV	RV					RV		RV	RV

== Schedule ==
Index to colors and formatting
MVFC member won
MVFC member lost
MVFC teams in **bold**

All times Central time.

† denotes Homecoming game
^ denotes AP Poll ranking for FBS teams

=== Regular season schedule ===
==== Week 1 ====
Date	Time	Visiting team	Home team	Site	TV	Result	Attendance	Ref.
September 1	5:00 p.m.	North Alabama	**Indiana State**	Memorial Stadium • Terre Haute, IN	ESPN+	**W** 17–14 ^{OT}	4,851	
September 1	6:30 p.m.	**Western Illinois**	UT Martin	Hardy M. Graham Stadium • Martin, TN	ESPN+	**L** 25–42	5,127	
September 1	7:00 p.m.	No. 5 **Missouri State**	Central Arkansas	Estes Stadium • Conway, AR	ESPN+	**W** 27–14	10,277	
September 3	11:00 a.m.	No. 2 **South Dakota State**	Iowa	Kinnick Stadium • Iowa City, IA	FS1	**L** 3–7	69,250	
September 3	12:00 p.m.	No. 21 **Northern Iowa**	Air Force	Falcon Stadium • Colorado Springs, CO		**L** 17–48	31,180	
September 3	1:00 p.m.	Duquesne	**Youngstown State**	Stambaugh Stadium • Youngstown, OH	ESPN+	**W** 31–14	9,835	
September 3	2:30 p.m.	**North Dakota**	Nebraska	Memorial Stadium • Lincoln, NE	BTN	**L** 17–38	86,590	
September 3	2:30 p.m.	Drake	No. 1 **North Dakota State**	Fargodome • Fargo, ND	ESPN+	**W** 56–14	15,951	
September 3	6:00 p.m.	**South Dakota**	Kansas State	Bill Snyder Family Stadium • Manhattan, KS	Big 12 on ESPN+	**L** 0–34	50,469	
September 3	6:00 p.m.	No. 9 **Southern Illinois**	Incarnate Word	Gayle and Tom Benson Stadium • San Antonio, TX	ESPN+	**L** 29–64	2,656	
September 3	6:00 p.m.	**Illinois State**	No. 18^ Wisconsin	Camp Randall Stadium • Madison, WI	FS1	**L** 0–38	73,727	
^{#}Rankings from Stats Perform. All times are in Central Time.

==== Week 2 ====
Date	Time	Visiting team	Home team	Site	TV	Result	Attendance	Ref.
September 8	7:00 p.m.	UT Martin	No. 5 **Missouri State**	Robert W. Plaster Stadium • Springfield, MO	ESPN+	**W** 35–30	9,872	
September 10	11:00 a.m.	**Western Illinois**	Minnesota	Huntington Bank Stadium • Minneapolis, MN	BTN	**L** 10–62	43,859	
September 10	1:00 p.m.	Dayton	**Youngstown State**	Stambaugh Stadium • Youngstown, OH	ESPN+	**W** 49–16	13,597	
September 10	2:30 p.m.	**South Dakota**	No. 3 Montana	Washington-Grizzly Stadium • Missoula, MT	ESPN+	**L** 7–24	24,404	
September 10	2:30 p.m.	North Carolina A&T	No. 1 **North Dakota State**	Fargodome • Fargo, ND	ESPN+	**W** 43–3	16,269	
September 10	3:00 p.m.	**Indiana State**	Purdue	Ross-Ade Stadium • West Lafayette, IN	BTN	**L** 0–56	53,676	
September 10	3:00 p.m.	No. 24 **Northern Iowa**	No. RV **North Dakota**	Alerus Center • Grand Forks, ND	ESPN+	**UND** 29–27	9,940	
September 10	6:00 p.m.	UC Davis	No. 2 **South Dakota State**	Dana J. Dykhouse Stadium • Brookings, SD	ESPN+	**W** 24–22	15,182	
September 10	6:00 p.m.	Southeast Missouri State	No. 17 **Southern Illinois**	Saluki Stadium • Carbondale, IL	ESPN3	**L** 31–34	8,662	
September 10	6:30 p.m.	Valparaiso	**Illinois State**	Hancock Stadium • Normal, IL	ESPN+	**W** 28–21	6,937	
^{#}Rankings from Stats Perform. All times are in Central Time.

==== Week 3 ====
Date	Time	Visiting team	Home team	Site	TV	Result	Attendance	Ref.
September 17	11:00 a.m.	No. RV **Youngstown State**	No. 9^ Kentucky	Kroger Field • Lexington, KY	SECN	**L** 0–31	59,308	
September 17	6:00 p.m.	No. 5 **Missouri State**	No. 10^ Arkansas	Razorback Stadium • Fayetteville, AR	SEC+/ESPN+	**L** 17–38	74,133	
September 17	11:00 a.m.	No. RV **Southern Illinois**	Northwestern	Ryan Field • Evanston, IL	BTN	**W** 31–24	23,146	
September 17	12:00 p.m.	No. 2 Montana	**Indiana State**	Memorial Stadium • Terre Haute, IN	ESPN+	**L** 14–49	5,929	
September 17	1:00 p.m.	Cal Poly	No. RV **South Dakota**†	DakotaDome • Vermillion, SD	ESPN+	**W** 38–21	6,812	
September 17	3:00 p.m.	No. 22 **North Dakota**	Northern Arizona	J. Lawrence Walkup Skydome • Flagstaff, AZ	ESPN+	**W** 27–24	7,841	
September 17	3:00 p.m.	Southern Utah	**Western Illinois**	Hanson Field • Macomb, IL	ESPN+	**L** 10–17	5,024	
September 17	4:00 p.m.	No. 7 Sacramento State	No. RV **Northern Iowa**	UNI-Dome • Cedar Falls, IA	ESPN+	**L** 21–37	8,818	
September 17	6:00 p.m.	Butler	No. 2 **South Dakota State**	Dana J. Dykhouse Stadium • Brookings, SD	ESPN+	**W** 45–17	16,414	
September 17	6:30 p.m.	Eastern Illinois	**Illinois State**	Hancock Stadium • Normal, IL	ESPN+	**W** 35–7	8,208	
September 17	8:00 p.m.	No. 1 **North Dakota State**	Arizona	Arizona Stadium • Tucson, AZ	FS1	**L** 28–31	41,211	
^{#}Rankings from Stats Perform. All times are in Central Time.

==== Week 4 ====
Date	Time	Visiting team	Home team	Site	TV	Result	Attendance	Ref.
September 24	1:00 p.m.	No. 1 **North Dakota State**	No. RV **South Dakota**	DakotaDome • Vermillion, SD	ESPN+	**NDSU** 34–17	6,530	
September 24	2:00 p.m.	No. 2 **South Dakota State**	No. 6 **Missouri State**	Robert W. Plaster Stadium • Springfield, MO	ESPN3	**SDSU** 28–14	13,189	
September 24	2:00 p.m.	No. 19 **North Dakota**	No. 24 **Southern Illinois**	Saluki Stadium • Carbondale, IL	ESPN+	**SIU** 34–17	8,053	
September 24	3:00 p.m.	**Northern Iowa**	**Western Illinois**	Hanson Field • Macomb, IL	ESPN+	**UNI** 52–17	4,500	
^{#}Rankings from Stats Perform. All times are in Central Time.

Date	Bye Week		
September 24	Illinois State	Indiana State	No. RV Youngstown State

==== Week 5 ====
Date	Time	Visiting team	Home team	Site	TV	Result	Attendance	Ref.
October 1	12:00 p.m.	No. 7 **Missouri State**	No. RV **North Dakota**†	Alerus Center • Grand Forks, ND	ESPN+	**UND** 48–31	10,020	
October 1	1:00 p.m.	No. RV **Youngstown State**	No. 1 **North Dakota State** †	Fargodome • Fargo, ND	ESPN+	**NDSU** 27–14	18,055	
October 1	2:00 p.m.	**Western Illinois**	No. 2 **South Dakota State**†	Dana J. Dykhouse Stadium • Brookings, SD	ESPN+	**SDSU** 34–10	15,237	
October 1	4:00 p.m.	**Indiana State**	**Northern Iowa**	UNI-Dome • Cedar Falls, IA	ESPN+	**UNI** 20–14	6,830	
October 1	6:30 p.m.	No. 19 **Southern Illinois**	**Illinois State**	Hancock Stadium • Normal, IL	ESPN+	**SIU** 19–14	11,127	
^{#}Rankings from Stats Perform. All times are in Central Time.

Date	Bye Week
October 1	South Dakota

==== Week 6 ====
Date	Time	Visiting team	Home team	Site	TV	Result	Attendance	Ref.
October 8	12:00 p.m.	No. 1 **North Dakota State**	**Indiana State**	Memorial Stadium • Terre Haute, IN	ESPN+	**NDSU** 31–26	4,185	
October 8	2:00 p.m.	No. 17 **Southern Illinois**	No. 20 **Missouri State**	Robert W. Plaster Stadium • Springfield, MO	ESPN+	**SIU** 38–21	7,061	
October 8	2:00 p.m.	No. RV **South Dakota**	No. 2 **South Dakota State**	Dana J. Dykhouse Stadium • Brookings, SD (Battle for South Dakota)	ESPN+	**SDSU** 28–3	19,332	
October 8	4:00 p.m.	**Illinois State**	**Northern Iowa**†	UNI-Dome • Cedar Falls, IA	ESPN+	**ILL ST** 23–21	9,306	
October 8	5:00 p.m.	No. 22 **North Dakota**	**Youngstown State**	Stambaugh Stadium • Youngstown, OH	ESPN+	**UND** 35–30	11,009	
^{#}Rankings from Stats Perform. All times are in Central Time.

Date	Bye Week
October 8	Western Illinois

==== Week 7 ====
Date	Time	Visiting team	Home team	Site	TV	Result	Attendance	Ref.
October 15	1:00 p.m.	**Indiana State**	**Youngstown State**†	Stambaugh Stadium • Youngstown, OH	ESPN+	**YSU** 48–42	9,326	
October 15	2:00 p.m.	**South Dakota**	No. RV **Illinois State**†	Hancock Stadium • Normal, IL	ESPN3	**ILL ST** 12–10	9,302	
October 15	2:00 p.m.	**Western Illinois**	No. 16 **Southern Illinois**†	Saluki Stadium • Carbondale, IL	ESPN+	**SIU** 30–7	10,118	
October 15	2:30 p.m.	No. 2 **South Dakota State**	No. 1 **North Dakota State**	Fargodome • Fargo, ND (Dakota Marker)	ESPN+	**SDSU** 23–21	18,603	
October 15	4:00 p.m.	Utah Tech	**Northern Iowa**	UNI-Dome • Cedar Falls, IA	ESPN+	**W** 41–14	6,942	
^{#}Rankings from Stats Perform. All times are in Central Time.

Date	Bye Week	
October 15	No. RV Missouri State	No. 20 North Dakota

==== Week 8 ====
Date	Time	Visiting team	Home team	Site	TV	Result	Attendance	Ref.
October 22	12:00 p.m.	No. RV **Illinois State**	**Indiana State**†	Memorial Stadium • Terre Haute, IN	ESPN3	**ILL ST** 27–21	5,182	
October 22	2:00 p.m.	No. 14 **Southern Illinois**	**South Dakota**	DakotaDome • Vermillion, SD	ESPN+	**USD** 27–24	7,599	
October 22	3:00 p.m.	No. 1 **South Dakota State**	No. 20 **North Dakota**	Alerus Center • Grand Forks, ND	ESPN+	**SDSU** 49–35	11,067	
October 22	3:00 p.m.	**Youngstown State**	**Western Illinois**†	Hanson Field • Macomb, IL	ESPN+	**YSU** 28–27	7,217	
October 22	4:00 p.m.	No. RV **Missouri State**	**Northern Iowa**	UNI-Dome • Cedar Falls, IA	ESPN+	**UNI** 41–20	8,809	
^{#}Rankings from Stats Perform. All times are in Central Time.

Date	Bye Week
October 22	No. 4 North Dakota State

==== Week 9 ====
Date	Time	Visiting team	Home team	Site	TV	Result	Attendance	Ref.
October 29	1:00 p.m.	**South Dakota**	**Youngstown State**	Stambaugh Stadium • Youngstown, OH	ESPN+	**YSU** 45–24	9,240	
October 29	2:00 p.m.	**Indiana State**	No. 1 **South Dakota State**	Dana J. Dykhouse Stadium • Brookings, SD	ESPN+	**SDSU** 49–7	19,041	
October 29	2:00 p.m.	**Western Illinois**	**Missouri State**†	Robert W. Plaster Stadium • Springfield, MO	ESPN+	**MO ST** 64–14	10,712	
October 29	2:00 p.m.	**Northern Iowa**	No. 20 **Southern Illinois**	Saluki Stadium • Carbondale, IL	ESPN3	**UNI** 37–36	6,155	
October 29	2:30 p.m.	No. RV **Illinois State**	No. 4 **North Dakota State**	Fargodome • Fargo, ND	ESPN+	**NDSU** 24–7	16,172	
October 29	3:00 p.m.	Abilene Christian	No. 23 **North Dakota**	Alerus Center • Grand Forks, ND	ESPN+	**W** 34–31	8,355	
^{#}Rankings from Stats Perform. All times are in Central Time.

==== Week 10 ====
Date	Time	Visiting team	Home team	Site	TV	Result	Attendance	Ref.
November 5	12:00 p.m.	No. 21 **North Dakota**	**Indiana State**	Memorial Stadium • Terre Haute, IN	ESPN+	**UND** 42–7	2,534	
November 5	1:00 p.m.	**Missouri State**	**South Dakota**	DakotaDome • Vermillion, SD	ESPN3	**USD** 20–13	5,341	
November 5	1:00 p.m.	No. 4 **North Dakota State**	**Western Illinois**	Hanson Field • Macomb, IL	ESPN+	**NDSU** 56–17	2,534	
November 5	2:00 p.m.	**Youngstown State**	**Illinois State**	Hancock Stadium • Normal, IL	ESPN+	**YSU** 19–17	4,989	
November 5	4:00 p.m.	No. 1 **South Dakota State**	No. RV **Northern Iowa**	UNI-Dome • Cedar Falls, IA	ESPN+	**SDSU** 31–28	9,449	
^{#}Rankings from Stats Perform. All times are in Central Time.

Date	Bye Week
November 5	No. RV Southern Illinois

==== Week 11 ====
Date	Time	Visiting team	Home team	Site	TV	Result	Attendance	Ref.
November 12	12:00 p.m.	**South Dakota**	No. 19 **North Dakota**	Alerus Center • Grand Forks, ND	ESPN+	**UND** 28–19	9,516	
November 12	1:00 p.m.	**Indiana State**	**Western Illinois**	Hanson Field • Macomb, IL	ESPN+	**IND ST** 21–0	2,661	
November 12	1:00 p.m.	No. 4 **North Dakota State**	No. RV **Southern Illinois**	Saluki Stadium • Carbondale, IL	ESPN+	**NDSU** 21–18	4,575	
November 12	2:00 p.m.	**Illinois State**	No. 1 **South Dakota State**	Dana J. Dykhouse Stadium • Brookings, SD	ESPN+	**SDSU** 31–7	8,160	
November 12	2:00 p.m.	No. RV **Youngstown State**	**Missouri State**	Robert W. Plaster Stadium • Springfield, MO	ESPN3	**MO ST** 25–22	5,148	
^{#}Rankings from Stats Perform. All times are in Central Time.

Date	Bye Week
November 12	Northern Iowa

==== Week 12 ====
Date	Time	Visiting team	Home team	Site	TV	Result	Attendance	Ref.
November 19	11:00 a.m.	**Western Illinois**	**Illinois State**	Hancock Stadium • Normal, IL	ESPN+	**ILL ST** 20–13 ^{OT}	2,579	
November 19	11:00 a.m.	**Southern Illinois**	**Youngstown State**	Stambaugh Stadium • Youngstown, OH	ESPN3	**YSU** 28–21	7,381	
November 19	12:00 p.m.	**Missouri State**	**Indiana State**	Memorial Stadium • Terre Haute, IN	ESPN+	**MO ST** 24–7	2,575	
November 19	1:00 p.m.	**Northern Iowa**	**South Dakota**	DakotaDome • Vermillion, SD	ESPN+	**UNI** 58–14	5,490	
November 19	2:30 p.m.	No. 16 **North Dakota**	No. 4 **North Dakota State**	Fargodome • Fargo, ND (Nickel Trophy)	ESPN+	**NDSU** 42–21	18,806	
^{#}Rankings from Stats Perform. All times are in Central Time.

Date	Bye Week
November 19	No. 1 South Dakota State

== Postseason ==
In 2022, three teams made the FCS Playoffs. South Dakota State (No. 1) and North Dakota State (No. 3) both received byes, while North Dakota was unseeded and played in the opening round. Below are the games in which they played.

Index to colors and formatting
MVFC member won
MVFC member lost
MVFC teams in **bold**

All times Central time. Tournament seedings in parentheses

=== First round ===
Date	Time	Visiting team	Home team	Site	TV	Result	Attendance	Ref.
November 26	3:00 p.m.	No. 20 **North Dakota**	No. 9 Weber State (Big Sky)	Stewart Stadium • Ogden, UT	ESPN+	**L** 31–38	4,495	
^{#}Rankings from Stats Perform. All times are in Central Time.

=== Second round ===
Date	Time	Visiting team	Home team	Site	TV	Result	Attendance	Ref.
December 3	2:00 p.m.	No. 23 Delaware (CAA)	No. 1 (1) **South Dakota State**	Dana J. Dykhouse Stadium • Brookings, SD	ESPN+	**W** 42–6	6,117	
December 3	2:30 p.m.	No. 19 Montana (Big Sky)	No. 4 (3) **North Dakota State**	Fargodome • Fargo, ND	ESPN+	**W** 49–26	12,929	
^{#}Rankings from Stats Perform. All times are in Central Time.

=== Quarterfinals ===
Date	Time	Visiting team	Home team	Site	TV	Result	Attendance	Ref.
December 9	6:00 p.m.	No. 8 (6) Samford (SoCon)	No. 4 (3) **North Dakota State**	Fargodome • Fargo, ND	ESPN2	**W** 27–9	11,825	
December 10	11:00 a.m.	No. 7 (8) Holy Cross (Patriot League)	No. 1 (1) **South Dakota State**	Dana J. Dykhouse Stadium • Brookings, SD	ESPN	**W** 42–21	6,549	
^{#}Rankings from Stats Perform. All times are in Central Time.

=== Semifinals ===
Date	Time	Visiting team	Home team	Site	TV	Result	Attendance	Ref.
December 16	6:00 p.m.	No. 5 (7) Incarnate Word (Southland)	No. 4 (3) **North Dakota State**	Fargodome • Fargo, ND	ESPN2	**W** 35–32	12,569	
December 17	3:00 p.m.	No. 3 (4) Montana State (Big Sky)	No. 1 (1) **South Dakota State**	Dana J. Dykhouse Stadium • Brookings, SD	ESPN2	**W** 39–18	7,195	
^{#}Rankings from Stats Perform. All times are in Central Time.

=== National Championship ===
Date	Time	Visiting team	Home team	Site	TV	Result	Attendance	Ref.
January 8	1:00 p.m.	No. 4 (3) **North Dakota State**	No. 1 (1) **South Dakota State**	Toyota Stadium • Frisco, TX	ABC	**SDSU** 45-21	18,023	
^{#}Rankings from Stats Perform. All times are in Central Time.

== MVFC records vs other conferences ==
2022-23 records against non-conference foes (through December 17, 2022):

FCS Power Conferences	Record
Big Sky	3-4
CAA	None
FCS Power Total	3-4
Other FCS Conferences	Record
ASUN	2-0
Big South	1-0
Ivy League	None
MEAC	None
Northeast	None
OVC	3-1
Patriot	None
PFL	4-0
SoCon	None
Southland	0-1
SWAC	None
WAC	2-0
Other FCS Total	12-2
FBS Opponents	Record
Football Bowl Subdivision	1-10
Total Non-Conference Record	16-16

Post Season

FCS Power Conferences	Record
Big Sky	2-1
CAA	1-0
FCS Power Total	3-1
Other FCS Conferences	Record
ASUN	None
Big South	None
Ivy League	None
MEAC	None
Northeast	None
OVC	None
Patriot	1-0
PFL	None
SoCon	1-0
Southland	1-0
SWAC	None
WAC	None
Other FCS Total	3-0
Total Postseason Record	6-1

== Awards and honors ==
=== Player of the week honors ===
Week	Offensive			Defensive			Special Teams			Freshman		
Week	Player	Position	Team	Player	Position	Team	Player	Position	Team	Player	Position	Team
Week 1 (Sept. 4)	Jaleel McLaughlin	RB	YSU	Adam Bock	LB	SDSU	Ryan O'Grady	PK	IN ST	Naseim Brantley	WR	WIU
Week 1 (Sept. 4)	Jaleel McLaughlin	RB	YSU	Ryan Cole	S	IN ST	Montrae Braswell	CB/RS	MO ST	Naseim Brantley	WR	WIU
Week 2 (Sept. 11)	Jason Shelley	QB	MO ST	Zeke Vandenburgh	LB	ILL ST	Jalen Carr	KR	ILL ST	Jacardia Wright	RB	MO ST
Week 3 (Sept. 18)	Nic Baker	QB	SIU	Zeke Vandenburgh	LB	ILL ST	Cade Peterson	P	UND	Zack Annexstad	QB	ILL ST
Week 3 (Sept. 18)	Jason Shelley	QB	MO ST	Zeke Vandenburgh	LB	ILL ST	Cade Peterson	P	UND	Zack Annexstad	QB	ILL ST
Week 4 (Sept. 25)	Mark Gronowski	QB	SDSU	Woo Governor	DB	UNI	Griffin Crosa	K	NDSU	Dillon Thomas	S	MO ST
Week 5 (Oct. 2)	Isaiah Davis	RB	SDSU	Zeke Vandenburgh	LB	ILL ST	Brady Stevens	PK	UND	D'Ante' Cox	WR	SIU
Week 6 (Oct. 9)	Javon Williams Jr.	AP	SIU	Rylan Cole	S	IN ST	Will Mostaert	DT	NDSU	Cole Davis	DB	UND
Week 6 (Oct. 9)	Javon Williams Jr.	AP	SIU	Rylan Cole	S	IN ST	Will Mostaert	DT	NDSU	Ian Wagner	PK	ILL ST
Week 7 (Oct. 16)	Nic Baker	QB	SIU	Stephen Hillis	LB	USD	Hunter Dustman	K/P	SDSU	Cade Chambers	QB	IN ST
Week 8 (Oct. 23)	Mark Gronowski	QB	SDSU	Cameron Tisdale	CB	USD	Colt McFadden	PK	YSU	Zack Annexstad	QB	ILL ST
Week 8 (Oct. 23)	Dom Williams	RB	UNI	Cameron Tisdale	CB	USD	Colt McFadden	PK	YSU	Zack Annexstad	QB	ILL ST
Week 9 (Oct. 13)	Nic Baker	QB	SIU	Dylan Wudke	DE	YSU	Jose Pizano	PK	MO ST	Desmond Hutson	WR	UNI
Week 10 (Nov. 7)	TaMerik Williams	RB	NDSU	Alex Howard	LB	YSU	Hunter Dustman	K/P	SDSU	Aidan Bouman	QB	USD
Week 11 (Nov. 14)	Jaleel McLaughlin	RB	YSU	James Kaczor	LB	NDSU	Montrae Braswell	CB/RS	MO ST	Malachi McNeal	LB	UND
Week 11 (Nov. 14)	Tommy Schuster	QB	UND	James Kaczor	LB	NDSU	Montrae Braswell	CB/RS	MO ST	Malachi McNeal	LB	UND
Week 12 (Nov. 21)	Cam Miller	QB	NDSU	Zeke Vandenburg	LB	ILL ST	DJ Hart	WR/RS	NDSU	Garret Ollendieck	LB	IN ST
Week 12 (Nov. 21)	Theo Day	QB	UNI	Zeke Vandenburg	LB	ILL ST	DJ Hart	WR/RS	NDSU	Garret Ollendieck	LB	IN ST

In Week 12, an Offensive Lineman was also named to the player of the week honors, Nash Jensen of North Dakota State.

=== Players of the Year ===
On November 28, 2022, the Missouri Valley Football Conference released their Players of the Year and All-Conference Honors.

==== Offensive Player of the Year ====
- Jaleel McLaughlin, RB (Sr - Youngstown State)

==== Defensive Player of the Year ====
- Zeke Vandenburgh, LB (Sr - Illinois State)

==== Newcomer of the Year ====
- Naseim Brantley, WR (Jr - Western Illinois)

==== Freshman of the Year ====
- Cade Chambers, QB (Fr - Indiana State)

==== Coach of the Year ====
- John Stiegelmeier (South Dakota State)

=== All-Conference Teams ===
Award	Player	School	Position	Year
First Team Offense	Theo Day	Northern Iowa	QB	RS Jr.
First Team Offense	Isaiah Davis	South Dakota State	RB	Jr.
First Team Offense	Jaleel McLaughlin	Youngstown State	RB	Sr.
First Team Offense	Hunter Luepke	North Dakota State	FB	Sr.
First Team Offense	Naseim Brantley	Western Illinois	WR	Jr.
First Team Offense	Dante Hendrix	Indiana State	WR	RS Sr.
First Team Offense	Bryce Oliver	Youngstown State	WR	Jr.
First Team Offense	Tucker Kraft	South Dakota State	TE	Jr.
First Team Offense	Drew Bones	Illinois State	OL	Sr.
First Team Offense	Garret Greenfield	South Dakota State	OL	Sr.
First Team Offense	Nash Jensen	North Dakota State	OL	Sr.
First Team Offense	Cody Mauch	North Dakota State	OL	Sr.
First Team Offense	Mason McCormick	South Dakota State	OL	Sr.
First Team Offense	Hunter Luepke	North Dakota State	AP	Sr.
First Team Defense	Richie Hagarty	Southern Illinois	DL	So.
First Team Defense	Caleb Sanders	South Dakota State	DL	Sr.
First Team Defense	Spencer Waege	North Dakota State	DL	Sr.
First Team Defense	Reece Winkelman	South Dakota State	DL	Sr.
First Team Defense	Adam Bock	South Dakota State	LB	Jr.
First Team Defense	Stephen Hillis	South Dakota	LB	Jr.
First Team Defense	James Kaczor	North Dakota State	LB	Sr.
First Team Defense	Zeke Vandenburg	Illinois State	LB	Sr.
First Team Defense	Montrae Braswell	Missouri State	DB	Jr.
First Team Defense	Dyshawn Gales	South Dakota State	DB	Sr.
First Team Defense	Benny Sapp III	Northern Iowa	DB	Sr.
First Team Defense	Michael Tutsie	North Dakota State	DB	Sr.
First Team Defense	Dawson Weber	North Dakota State	DB	Sr.
First Team Special Teams	Grant Burkett	Missouri State	P	So.
First Team Special Teams	Matthew Cook	Northern Iowa	PK	Jr.
First Team Special Teams	Dalton Godfrey	South Dakota	DS	Sr.
First Team Special Teams	Montrae Braswell	Missouri State	RS	Jr.

Award	Player	School	Position	Year
Second Team Offense	Mark Gronowski	South Dakota State	QB	So.
Second Team Offense	Justin Dinka	Indiana State	RB	RS So.
Second Team Offense	Tyler Hoosman	North Dakota	RB	Jr.
Second Team Offense	Jacob Garrett	Southern Illinois	FB	Jr.
Second Team Offense	Bo Belquist	North Dakota	WR	Jr.
Second Team Offense	Avante Cox	Southern Illinois	WR	Sr.
Second Team Offense	Jaxon Janke	South Dakota State	WR	Sr.
Second Team Offense	Zach Heins	South Dakota State	TE	Sr
Second Team Offense	Landon Bebee	Missouri State	OL	Jr.
Second Team Offense	Alex Jensen	South Dakota	OL	Sr.
Second Team Offense	Mike McAllister	Youngstown State	OL	Sr.
Second Team Offense	Erik Sorenson	Northern Iowa	OL	RS Sr.
Second Team Offense	Donny Ventrelli	North Dakota	OL	Sr.
Second Team Offense	Javon Williams Jr.	Southern Illinois	AP	Jr.
Second Team Defense	Khristian Boyd	Northern Iowa	DL	RS Jr.
Second Team Defense	Kevin Ellis	Missouri State	DL	Sr.
Second Team Defense	Ben McNaboe	North Dakota	DL	Jr.
Second Team Defense	Dylan Wudke	Youngstown State	DL	So.
Second Team Defense	Branson Combs	Southern Illinois	LB	So.
Second Team Defense	Spencer Cuvelier	Northern Iowa	LB	RS Sr.
Second Team Defense	Ferrin Manuleleua	Missouri State	LB	Sr.
Second Team Defense	Brock Mogensen	South Dakota	LB	Jr.
Second Team Defense	Korby Sander	Northern Iowa	LB	GS
Second Team Defense	Rylan Cole	Indiana State	DB	So.
Second Team Defense	Woo Governor	Northern Iowa	DB	Jr.
Second Team Defense	Myles Harden	South Dakota	DB	So.
Second Team Defense	PJ Jules	Southern Illinois	DB	Jr.
Second Team Defense	C.J. Siegel	North Dakota	DB	Sr.
Second Team Special Teams	John Bickle	South Dakota	P	Sr.
Second Team Special Teams	Colt McFadden	Youngstown State	PK	Sr.
Second Team Special Teams	Hunter Brozio	North Dakota State	DS	Jr.
Second Team Special Teams	Jadon Janke	South Dakota State	RS	Sr.

=== All-Newcomer Team ===
Award	Player	School	Position	Year
All-Newcomer Team Offense	Zack Annexstad	Illinois State	QB	Jr.
All-Newcomer Team Offense	Aidan Bouman	South Dakota	QB	RS Fr.
All-Newcomer Team Offense	Naseim Brantley	Western Illinois	WR	Jr.
All-Newcomer Team Offense	Brayden Bryant	North Dakota	OL	So.
All-Newcomer Team Offense	Cade Chambers	Indiana State	QB	RS Fr.
All-Newcomer Team Offense	D'Ante' Cox	Southern Illinois	WR	Sr.
All-Newcomer Team Offense	Desmond Hutson	Northern Iowa	WR	RS Fr.
All-Newcomer Team Offense	Shomari Lawrence	South Dakota	RB	RS Fr.
All-Newcomer Team Offense	John O'Brian	South Dakota State	OL	Jr.
All-Newcomer Team Offense	Max Tomczak	Youngstown State	WR	RS Fr.
All-Newcomer Team Offense	Jacardia Wright	Missouri State	RB	So.
All-Newcomer Team Offense	Wenkers Wright	Illinois State	RB	RS Fr.
All-Newcomer Defense	Cordarrius Bailey	Northern Iowa	DE	RS Sr.
All-Newcomer Defense	John Bickle	South Dakota	P	Sr.
All-Newcomer Defense	Jaxon Duttenhefer	North Dakota State	DT	RS Fr.
All-Newcomer Defense	Jason Freeman	South Dakota State	LB	Jr.
All-Newcomer Defense	Chris Harris	Southern Illinois	LB	Sr.
All-Newcomer Defense	Logan Kopp	North Dakota State	LB	RS Fr.
All-Newcomer Defense	Deandre Lamont	Illinois State	DB	Sr.
All-Newcomer Defense	Tucker Large	South Dakota State	S/LB	RS Fr.
All-Newcomer Defense	Kole Menz	North Dakota State	DE	RS Fr.
All-Newcomer Defense	Edmund Ocansey	North Dakota	DB	RS Fr.
All-Newcomer Defense	Garret Ollendieck	Indiana State	LB	So.
All-Newcomer Defense	Noah Pettinger	Northern Iowa	P	Fr.
All-Newcomer Defense	Michael Scott	South Dakota	DE	Sr.

=== National Awards ===
On December 5, 2022, STATS Perform released their list of finalists for the Walter Payton Award, Buck Buchanan Award, and the Jerry Rice Award, respectively.

==== Walter Payton Award ====
The Walter Payton Award is given to the best FCS offensive player. Here are the MVFC finalists:

- Jaleel McLaughlin (RB - Youngstown State)
- Cody Mauch (OL - North Dakota State)
- Hunter Luepke (FB - North Dakota State)

==== Buck Buchanan Award ====
The Buck Buchanan Award is given to the best FCS defensive player. The MVFC’s own Zeke Vandenburg (LB - Illinois State) won the award, and was honored at the National Championship game in January.
Here are the other MVFC finalists:

- Spencer Waege (DL - North Dakota State)
- Caleb Sanders (DL - South Dakota State)

==== Jerry Rice Award ====
The Jerry Rice Award is given to the best FCS freshman player. Here are the MVFC finalists:

- Cade Chambers (QB - Indiana State)

=== All-Americans ===
	AP 1st Team	AP 2nd Team	AP 3rd Team	AFCA 1st Team	AFCA 2nd Team	STATS 1st Team	STATS 2nd Team	STATS 3rd Team	ADA	HERO
Benny Sapp III, DB, Northern Iowa			✓		✓		✓			
Caleb Sanders, DL, South Dakota State	✓			✓		✓				✓
Cody Mauch, OL, North Dakota State	✓			✓		✓			✓	✓
Garret Greenfield, OL, South Dakota State	✓				✓	✓				
Hunter Luepke, FB, North Dakota State		✓				✓				✓
Jaleel McLaughlin, RB, Youngstown State	✓				✓	✓				✓
Matthew Cook, PK, Northern Iowa		✓			✓			✓		✓
Mason McCormick, OL, South Dakota State	✓			✓			✓			✓
Michael Tutsie, DB, North Dakota State			✓		✓					
Nash Jensen, OL, North Dakota State	✓				✓		✓			
Spencer Waege, DE, North Dakota State	✓				✓	✓				✓
Tucker Kraft, TE, South Dakota State			✓					✓		
Zeke Vandenburgh, LB, Illinois State	✓			✓		✓			✓	✓

== Home attendance ==
Team	Stadium	Capacity	Game 1	Game 2	Game 3	Game 4	Game 5	Game 6	Game 7	Game 8	Game 9	Total	Average	% of Capacity
Illinois State	Hancock Stadium	13,391	6,937	8,208	11,127†	9,302	4,989	2,579				43,142	7,190	53.7%
Indiana State	Memorial Stadium	12,764	4,851	5,929†	4,185	5,182	2,534	2,575				25,256	4,209	32.9%
Missouri State	Robert W. Plaster Stadium	17,500	9,872	13,189†	7,064	10,712	5,148					45,985	9,197	52.5%
North Dakota	Alerus Center	12,283	9,940	10,020	11,067†	8,355	9,516					48,898	9,779	79.6%
North Dakota State	Fargodome	18,700	15,951	16,269	18,055	18,603	16,172	**18,806**†	12,929‡	11,825‡	12,569‡	141,179	15,686	83.9%
Northern Iowa	UNI-Dome	16,324	8,818	6,830	9,306	6,942	8,809	9,449†				50,154	8,359	51.2%
South Dakota	DakotaDome	9,100	6,812	6,530	7,599†	5,341	5,490					31,772	6,354	69.8%
South Dakota State	Dana J. Dykhouse Stadium	19,340	15,182	16,414	15,237	19,332†	19,041	8,160	6,117‡	6,549‡	7,195‡	113,227	12,580	65.1%
Southern Illinois	Saluki Stadium	15,000	8,662	8,053	10,118†	6,155	4,575					37,563	7,512	50.0%
Western Illinois	Hanson Field	17,128	5,024†	4,500	4,973	2,534	2,661					19,692	3,938	23.0%
Youngstown State	Stambaugh Stadium	20,630	9,835	13,597†	11,009	9,326	9,240	7,381				60,388	10,064	48.8%

Bold - Exceed capacity
†Season High
‡FCS Playoff Game

== 2023 NFL draft ==
The following list includes all MVFC players who were drafted in the 2023 NFL draft.

Player	Position	School	Draft Round	Round Pick	Overall Pick	Team	Notes
Cody Mauch	OT	North Dakota State	2	17	48	Tampa Bay Buccaneers	from Detroit via Green Bay
Tucker Kraft	TE	South Dakota State	3	15	78	Green Bay Packers	

=== Undrafted Free Agents ===
Player	Position	School	Team
Hunter Luepke	FB	North Dakota State	Dallas Cowboys
Noah Gindorff	TE	North Dakota State	Seattle Seahawks
Nash Jensen	OL	North Dakota State	Carolina Panthers
Spencer Waege	DL	North Dakota State	San Francisco 49ers
Tyler Hoosman	RB	North Dakota	Los Angeles Chargers
Benny Sapp	CB	Northern Iowa	Green Bay Packers
Ty Scott	WR	Missouri State	Kansas City Chiefs
Mike McAllister	C	Youngstown State	Los Angeles Rams
Zeke Vandenburgh	LB	Illinois State	Miami Dolphins
Tanner Taula	TE	Illinois State	Tampa Bay Buccaneers
Jason Lewan	DE	Illinois State	Green Bay Packers
Alex Jensen	OT	South Dakota	Miami Dolphins
Caleb Sanders	DL	South Dakota State	New York Giants

== Head coaches ==
Through January 10, 2023

Team	Head coach	Years at school	Overall record	Record at school	MVFC record	MVFC titles	FCS Playoff appearances	FCS Playoff record	National Titles
Illinois State	Brock Spack	14	95–66 (.590)	95–66 (.590)	60–48 (.556)	2	5	7–5 (.583)	0
Indiana State	Curt Mallory	5	19–37 (.339)	19–37 (.339)	12–28 (.300)	0	0	0–0 (–)	0
Missouri State	Bobby Petrino (Note: Bobby Petrino coached in the FBS from 2003-06 and 2015-18 for Louisville, 2008-11 for Arkansas, as well as in 2013 for Western Kentucky.)	3	137–71 (.659)	18–15 (.545)	14–8 (.636)	1	2	0–2 (.000)	0
North Dakota	Bubba Schweigert (Note: Bubba Schweigert coached Minnesota Duluth of NCAA Division II from 2004-07. He also coached North Dakota while they were a part of the Big Sky Conference from 2014-17 and were independents in 2018 and 2019.)	9	76–66 (.535)	54–45 (.545)	12–9 (.571)	0	4	1–4 (.200)	0
North Dakota State	Matt Entz	4	49–7 (.875)	49–7 (.875)	27–4 (.871)	2	4	9–2 (.818)	2
Northern Iowa	Mark Farley	22	174–98 (.640)	174–98 (.640)	111–56 (.665)	7	13	16–13 (.552)	0
South Dakota	Bob Nielson (Note: Bob Nielson coached Western Illinois from 2013-15, which included a run in the playoffs that ended in the second round. Nielson also coached Minnesota-Duluth from 1999-2003 and 2008-12, that second stint included five consecutive NCAA Division II playoff appearances highlighted by 2 National Titles. In the first stint at MN-Duluth included his first Division II playoff appearance. Nielson also coached Wisconsin-Eau Claire from 1996-98 that included one NCAA Division III playoff run that ended in the semifinals. Before that, he coached Wartburg from 1991-95, which included two Division III playoff runs as well. His first head coaching job was at Ripon from 1989-90.)	7	218–122–1 (.641)	32–34 (.485)	22–30 (.423)	0	2	1–2 (.333)	2
South Dakota State	John Stiegelmeier (Note: John Stiegelmeier has coached South Dakota State since 1997, when the school was still part of NCAA Division II. While in Division II, the school did not achieve any playoff appearances.)	26	198–112 (.639)	198–112 (.639)	84–34 (.712)	3	12	18–11 (.621)	1
Southern Illinois	Nick Hill	7	34–39 (.466)	34–39 (.466)	20–28 (.417)	0	2	2–2 (.500)	0
Western Illinois	Myers Hendrickson (Note: Myers Hendrickson previously coached at Kansas Wesleyan of the NAIA from 2019-21, and helped the Coyotes to two NAIA playoff appearances.)	1	0–11 (.000)	0–11 (.000)	0–8 (.000)	0	0	0–0 (–)	0
Youngstown State	Doug Phillips	3	11–17 (.393)	11–17 (.393)	8–15 (.348)	0	0	0–0 (–)	0
