= Naseim Brantley =

American football player

No. 7 – Caudillos de Chihuahua
- Position: Wide receiver

Career information
- High school: Howell (Howell Township, New Jersey)
- College: Sacred Heart (2018–2021); Western Illinois (2022); Rutgers (2023–2024)
- NFL draft: 2025: undrafted

Career history
- Caudillos de Chihuahua (2026–present)

Awards and highlights
- Second-team FCS All-American (2022); MVFC Newcomer of the Year (2022); First-team All-MVFC (2022); First-team All-NEC (2020) (Note: Selected on offense); 2× Second-team All-NEC (2020, 2021) (Note: Selected on special teams in 2020 and on offense in 2021)
- Stats at ESPN

Naseim Brantley is an American football wide receiver for the Caudillos de Chihuahua of the Liga de Fútbol Americano Profesional (LFA). He played college football for the Sacred Heart Pioneers, the Western Illinois Leathernecks, and the Rutgers Scarlet Knights.

== Early life ==
Brantley is a native of Farmingdale, New Jersey. His family moved to Georgia when he was in middle school, but he "really didn’t want to leave". As a result, Brantley moved in with the family of a friend, Eddie Morales, whom he grew up playing Pop Warner football with, saying: "His family welcomed me and they treat me like I’m their son, and vice versa."

Brantley attended Howell High School in Howell Township, New Jersey, where he played basketball alongside Morales, and competed in track and field in the sprints and long jump events. He did not play football until his junior year, doubling as a wide receiver and cornerback. Brantley helped the Rebels win New Jersey State Interscholastic Athletic Association playoff games in back-to-back seasons in 2016 and 2017. He once again teamed up with Morales, who played as quarterback and cornerback. On November 10, 2017, Brantley scored a 96-yard kickoff return touchdown and a 55-yard rushing touchdown, in addition to recording an interception on defense, in a 31–17 playoff win over Cherokee High School.

Brantley was an unranked recruit. He committed to playing college football at Sacred Heart University, signing with the Pioneers during the early signing period in December 2017.

== College career ==
=== Sacred Heart ===
As a freshman in 2018, Brantley recorded 10 receptions for 198 yards and two touchdowns in five games before suffering a season-ending injury. In his collegiate debut, he posted three catches for 118 yards and two touchdowns in a 41–14 win over Wagner, earning Northeast Conference (NEC) co-Rookie of the Week honors. In 2019, Brantley tallied 33 receptions for 407 yards and two touchdowns in 10 games played for the Pioneers. Following the outbreak of the COVID-19 pandemic in early 2020, he returned home to New Jersey and trained alongside former high school teammate and Monmouth cornerback Eddie Morales.

In the pandemic-shortened 2020 season, Brantley started all five games at wide receiver. In the NEC Championship Game, he passed for a score and caught the game-winning touchdown in a 34–27 overtime win over Duquesne. Brantley finished the season with 14 receptions for 201 yards and two touchdowns. He earned first-team all-NEC honors on offense and second-team all-conference honors as a return specialist. In 2021, Brantley tallied 25 receptions for 455 yards and two touchdowns in 11 games played. He was a second-team all-NEC selection at wide receiver.

=== Western Illinois ===
Brantley transferred to Western Illinois University to play for the Leathernecks. In the 2022 season opener, he had six catches for 171 yards and three touchdowns in a 42–25 loss to UT Martin, earning Missouri Valley Football Conference (MVFC) Newcomer of the Week honors. Brantley finished the season with 53 receptions for 893 yards (Note: Other sources credit him with 903 receiving yards.) and nine touchdowns in 10 games played. He was named the MVFC Newcomer of the Year and a first-team all-conference honoree. He was also selected as a second-team FCS All-American by Phil Steele. Brantley entered the NCAA transfer portal after the season and was rated as a three-star transfer recruit by 247Sports. In January 2023, he committed to transferring to Rutgers University in his native New Jersey, which he picked over a list of undisclosed Power Five offers.

=== Rutgers ===
Brantley joined the Scarlet Knights as a graduate transfer. Despite arriving at Rutgers on time for spring practices, he was unable to participate due to an injury suffered the previous season. Brantley, who was expected to step into a significant role on the offense in the 2023 season, was suddenly ruled out of their season opener due to an "NCAA issue" regarding his eligibility, appearing as a scratch on the team's availability report just a few hours before kickoff. Rutgers head coach Greg Schiano said that he was "fuming", adding that "you could fry an egg on [his] head with that whole situation. Though he continued practicing with the team, Brantley remained sidelined throughout the entire season as his case dragged on. In January 2024, he was finally ruled eligible to play by the NCAA. Brantley said that learning he was cleared to play the 2024 season "was music to [his] ears". He appeared in three games for the Scarlet Knights in his seventh year of college football, making his team debut against Howard.

== Professional career ==
Brantley participated in the Rutgers Pro Day on March 12, 2025. He went unselected in the 2025 NFL draft.

Brantley signed with the Caudillos de Chihuahua of the Liga de Fútbol Americano Profesional (LFA) for the 2026 LFA season. He finished the six-game regular season with 22 receptions for 408 yards and two touchdowns. He also helped the Caudillos reach Tazón México IX.
