= 2022 Youngstown State Penguins football team =

American college football season

2022 Youngstown State Penguins football
- Conference: Missouri Valley Football Conference
- Record: 7–4 (5–3 MVFC)
- Head coach: Doug Phillips (3rd season)
- Offensive coordinator: Troy Rothenbuhler (3rd season)
- Offensive scheme: Multiple
- Defensive coordinator: Jahmal Brown (1st season)
- Base defense: 4–2–5
- Home stadium: Stambaugh Stadium

2022 Missouri Valley Football Conference standings
	Conf.			Overall
Team	W		L	W		L
No. 1 South Dakota State $^	8	–	0	14	–	1
No. 2 North Dakota State ^	7	–	1	12	–	3
No. 20 North Dakota ^	5	–	3	7	–	5
Youngstown State	5	–	3	7	–	4
Northern Iowa	5	–	3	6	–	5
Illinois State	4	–	4	6	–	5
Southern Illinois	4	–	4	5	–	6
Missouri State	3	–	5	5	–	6
South Dakota	2	–	6	3	–	8
Indiana State	1	–	7	2	–	9
Western Illinois	0	–	8	0	–	11
$ – Conference champion; ^ – FCS playoff participant; Rankings from STATS Poll

The 2022 Youngstown State Penguins football team represented Youngstown State University as a member of the Missouri Valley Football Conference (MVFC) during the 2022 NCAA Division I FCS football season. Led by third-year head coach Doug Phillips, the Penguins played their home games at Stambaugh Stadium in Youngstown, Ohio.

== Schedule ==
Date	Time	Opponent	Site	TV	Result	Attendance
September 3	7:00 p.m.	Duquesne*	Stambaugh Stadium; Youngstown, OH	ESPN+	W 31–14	9,835
September 10	2:00 p.m.	Dayton*	Stambaugh Stadium; Youngstown, OH	ESPN+	W 49–16	13,597
September 17	12:00 p.m.	at No. 9 (FBS) Kentucky*	Kroger Field; Lexington, KY	SECN	L 0–31	59,308
October 1	2:00 p.m.	at No. 1 North Dakota State	Fargodome; Fargo, ND	ABC ND/ESPN+	L 14–27	18,055
October 8	6:00 p.m.	No. 22 North Dakota	Stambaugh Stadium; Youngstown, OH	ESPN+	L 30–35	11,009
October 15	2:00 p.m.	Indiana State^{†}	Stambaugh Stadium; Youngstown, OH	ESPN+	W 48–42	9,326
October 22	4:00 p.m.	at Western Illinois	Hanson Field; Macomb, IL	ESPN+	W 28–27	7,217
October 29	2:00 p.m.	South Dakota	Stambaugh Stadium; Youngstown, OH	KELOXTRA	W 45–24	9,240
November 5	3:00 p.m.	at Illinois State	Hancock Stadium; Normal, IL	MSN	W 19–17	4,989
November 12	2:00 p.m.	at Missouri State	Robert W. Plaster Stadium; Springfield, MO	ESPN3	L 22–25	5,148
November 19	12:00 p.m.	Southern Illinois	Stambaugh Stadium; Youngstown, OH	ESPN3/ESPN+	W 28–21	7,381
*Non-conference game; ^{†}Homecoming; Rankings from STATS Poll released prior to the game; All times are in Eastern time

== Game summaries ==
=== vs Duquesne ===
	1	2	3	4	Total
Dukes	7	7	0	0	14
Penguins	7	10	0	14	31

=== vs Dayton ===
	1	2	3	4	Total
Flyers	0	10	0	6	16
Penguins	21	7	7	14	49

=== at No. 9 (FBS) Kentucky ===
	1	2	3	4	Total
Penguins	0	0	0	0	0
No. 9 (FBS) Wildcats	0	21	7	3	31

=== at No. 1 North Dakota State ===
	1	2	3	4	Total
Penguins	0	3	3	8	14
No. 1 Bison	14	7	0	6	27

=== vs No. 22 North Dakota ===
	1	2	3	4	Total
No. 22 Fighting Hawks	14	7	0	14	35
Penguins	3	18	3	6	30

=== vs Indiana State ===
	1	2	3	4	Total
Sycamores	14	14	14	0	42
Penguins	21	14	10	3	48

=== at Western Illinois ===
	1	2	3	4	Total
Penguins	3	7	0	18	28
Leathernecks	0	7	6	14	27

=== vs South Dakota ===
	1	2	3	4	Total
Coyotes	7	3	7	7	24
Penguins	10	28	7	0	45

=== at Illinois State ===
	1	2	3	4	Total
Penguins	7	6	0	6	19
Redbirds	10	7	0	0	17

=== at Missouri State ===
	1	2	3	4	Total
Penguins	3	3	10	6	22
Bears	0	7	7	11	25

=== vs Southern Illinois ===
	1	2	3	4	Total
Salukis	14	0	0	7	21
Penguins	7	0	0	21	28
