= 2022 South Dakota Coyotes football team =

American college football season

2022 South Dakota Coyotes football
- Conference: Missouri Valley Football Conference
- Record: 3–8 (2–6 MVFC)
- Head coach: Bob Nielson (7th season)
- Offensive coordinator: Ted Schlafke (5th season)
- Offensive scheme: Pro-style
- Defensive coordinator: Travis Johansen (4th season)
- Base defense: Multiple
- Home stadium: DakotaDome

2022 Missouri Valley Football Conference standings
	Conf.			Overall
Team	W		L	W		L
No. 1 South Dakota State $^	8	–	0	14	–	1
No. 2 North Dakota State ^	7	–	1	12	–	3
No. 20 North Dakota ^	5	–	3	7	–	5
Youngstown State	5	–	3	7	–	4
Northern Iowa	5	–	3	6	–	5
Illinois State	4	–	4	6	–	5
Southern Illinois	4	–	4	5	–	6
Missouri State	3	–	5	5	–	6
South Dakota	2	–	6	3	–	8
Indiana State	1	–	7	2	–	9
Western Illinois	0	–	8	0	–	11
$ – Conference champion; ^ – FCS playoff participant; Rankings from STATS Poll

The 2022 South Dakota Coyotes football team represented the University of South Dakota in the 2022 NCAA Division I FCS football season. The Coyotes competed as members of the Missouri Valley Football Conference and were led by seventh-year head coach Bob Nielson. They played their home games at the DakotaDome in Vermillion, South Dakota.

== Schedule ==
Date	Time	Opponent	Site	TV	Result	Attendance
September 3	6:00 p.m.	at Kansas State*	Bill Snyder Family Football Stadium; Manhattan, KS	ESPN+	L 0–34	50,469
September 10	2:00 p.m.	at No. 3 Montana*	Washington–Grizzly Stadium; Missoula, MT	ESPN+	L 7–24	24,204
September 17	1:00 p.m.	Cal Poly*	DakotaDome; Vermillion, SD	ESPN+	W 38–21	6,812
September 24	1:00 p.m.	No. 1 North Dakota State	DakotaDome; Vermillion, SD	ESPN+	L 17–34	6,530
October 8	2:00 p.m.	at No. 2 South Dakota State	Dana J. Dykhouse Stadium; Brookings, SD (rivalry)	ESPN+	L 3–28	19,332
October 15	2:00 p.m.	at Illinois State	Hancock Stadium; Normal, IL	ESPN3	L 10-12	9,302
October 22	2:00 p.m.	No. 14 Southern Illinois	DakotaDome; Vermillion, SD	ESPN+	W 27–24	7,599
October 29	1:00 p.m.	at Youngstown State	Stambaugh Stadium; Youngstown, OH	KELO Xtra	L 24–45	9,240
November 5	2:00 p.m.	Missouri State	DakotaDome; Vermillion, SD	ESPN3	W 20–13	5,341
November 12	12:00 p.m.	at No. 19 North Dakota	Alerus Center; Grand Forks, ND (Sitting Bull Trophy)	ESPN+	L 19–28	9,516
November 19	2:00 p.m.	Northern Iowa	DakotaDome; Vermillion, SD	ESPN+	L 14–58	5,490
*Non-conference game; Rankings from STATS Poll released prior to the game; All times are in Central time

== Game summaries ==
=== At Kansas State ===
	1	2	3	4	Total
Coyotes	0	0	0	0	0
Wildcats	20	7	7	0	34

South Dakota did not hold up against Kansas State, failing to score the entire game. South Dakota gave up a blocked punt that the Wildcats turned into a touchdown, couldn't stop what was called an "impressive" ground game, and gave up a touchdown in the first ten seconds. South Dakota did hold Kansas State to just 96 passing yards. Kansas State won the game 34-0.

=== At No. 3 Montana ===
	1	2	3	4	Total
Coyotes	0	0	0	7	7
No. 3 Grizzlies	13	0	9	2	24

=== Cal Poly ===
	1	2	3	4	Total
Mustangs	7	0	0	14	21
Coyotes	21	0	0	17	38

=== No. 1 North Dakota State ===
	1	2	3	4	Total
No. 1 Bison	0	10	14	10	34
Coyotes	3	14	0	0	17

=== At No. 2 South Dakota State ===
	1	2	3	4	Total
Coyotes	3	0	0	0	3
No. 2 Jackrabbits	0	14	7	7	28

=== At Illinois State ===
	1	2	3	4	Total
Coyotes	0	7	3	0	10
Redbirds	3	3	6	0	12

=== No. 14 Southern Illinois ===
	1	2	3	4	Total
No. 14 Salukis	14	7	3	0	24
Coyotes	7	3	7	10	27

=== At Youngstown State ===
	1	2	3	4	Total
Coyotes	7	3	7	7	24
Penguins	10	28	7	0	45

=== Missouri State ===
	1	2	3	4	Total
Bears	3	0	0	10	13
Coyotes	7	6	7	0	20

=== At No. 19 North Dakota ===
	1	2	3	4	Total
Coyotes	6	7	0	6	19
No. 19 Fighting Hawks	7	7	14	0	28

=== Northern Iowa ===
	1	2	3	4	Total
Panthers	21	28	6	3	58
Coyotes	0	7	0	7	14
