= Michael Tutsie =

American football player (born 1998)

Profile
- Position: Safety

Personal information
- Born: February 21, 1998 (age 28); Indianapolis, Indiana, U.S.
- Listed height: 5 ft 11 in (1.80 m)
- Listed weight: 189 lb (86 kg)

Career information
- High school: Warren Central (Indianapolis)
- College: North Dakota State
- NFL draft: 2023: undrafted

Career history
- Indianapolis Colts (2023–2024)*; Michigan Panthers (2025)
- * Offseason or practice squad member only

Awards and highlights
- 4× FCS national champion (2017, 2018, 2019, 2021); Second-team FCS All-American (2022); 2× First-team All-MVFC (2021, 2022)
- Stats at Pro Football Reference

Michael Tutsie (born February 21, 1998) is an American professional football safety. He played college football for the North Dakota State Bison.

== Early life ==
Tutsie grew up in Indianapolis, Indiana, the son of a Marian University assistant football coach. He played football at Warren Central High School in Indianapolis. In 2016, his senior year, Tutsie was selected to the first-team all-state and all-country teams.

== College career ==
After redshirting in the 2017 season, Tutsie recorded 17 tackles and two interceptions in 12 games in 2018. He recorded 105 tackles and seven interceptions while starting in all 16 games in 2019, earning an honorable mention for the all-Missouri Valley Football Conference team. Tutsie started all 10 games and recorded 50 tackles in the 2020 season, which was played in spring 2021 due to the COVID-19 pandemic, and was named to the second-team all-MVFC team. In the 2021 season, he recorded 81 tackles and an interception while starting all 15 games, and was named to the all-MVFC first team, the Stats Perform all-America third team, and the HERO sports all-America first team.

Tutsie returned for the 2022 season, starting all 15 games and recording 85 tackles and an interception, earning American Football Coaches Association FCS All-America Second Team and Associated Press FCS All-America Third Team honors, as well as repeating an appearance to the first-team all-MVFC team. In his time at North Dakota State, the Bison won FCS national championships in 2017, 2018, 2019, and 2021. Tutsie finished his career at North Dakota State fifth in tackles and second in solo tackles in school history.

== Professional career ==
Pre-draft measurables
Height	Weight	Arm length	Hand span	40-yard dash	10-yard split	20-yard split	20-yard shuttle	Three-cone drill	Vertical jump	Broad jump
5 ft 10 1/4 in (1.78 m)	189 lb (86 kg)	30 1/4 in (0.77 m)	8 1/2 in (0.22 m)	4.62 s	1.58 s	2.64 s	4.21 s	6.87 s	33.5 in (0.85 m)	10 ft 1 in (3.07 m)
All values from Pro Day

=== Indianapolis Colts ===
After going unselected in the 2023 NFL draft, Tutsie was invited to participate in the Indianapolis Colts' minicamp. He signed with the Colts on June 15, 2023. He was waived/injured on August 9 and reverted to the Colts' injured reserve on August 11 after clearing waivers. Following an injury settlement, the Colts released Tutsie from injured reserve on August 17. Tutsie signed a reserve/futures contract with the Colts on January 9, 2024.

Tutsie was waived by the Colts on August 27, 2024. He was re-signed to the practice squad on December 26.

=== Michigan Panthers ===
On June 10, 2025, Tutsie signed with the Michigan Panthers of the United Football League (UFL). On July 5, 2025, Tutsie re-signed with the Panthers.

== Coaching career ==
Tutsie coaches the Marian Knights as an assistant defensive backs coach.
