= Branson Combs =

American football player (born 2000)

No. 50 – Jacksonville Jaguars
- Position: Linebacker
- Roster status: Active

Personal information
- Born: July 14, 2000 (age 26); Evansville, Indiana, U.S.
- Listed height: 6 ft 3 in (1.91 m)
- Listed weight: 228 lb (103 kg)

Career information
- High school: Reitz Memorial (Evansville)
- College: Southern Illinois (2019–2023); Wake Forest (2024)
- NFL draft: 2025: undrafted

Career history
- Jacksonville Jaguars (2025–present)

Awards and highlights
- 2× Second-team All-MVFC (2022, 2023); Second-team All-ACC (2024)

Career NFL statistics as of 2025
- Total tackles: 9
- Forced fumbles: 1
- Stats at Pro Football Reference

Branson Combs (born July 14, 2000) is an American professional football linebacker for the Jacksonville Jaguars of the National Football League (NFL). He played college football for the Southern Illinois Salukis and Wake Forest Demon Deacons.

== Early life ==
Combs was born on July 14, 2000, in Evansville, Indiana, to Annette and Ronnie Combs. He attended Reitz Memorial High School where he was a three-sport athlete playing for the Memorial Tigers football, basketball and baseball teams. Standing 6 ft 3 in (1.91 m) and weighing 185 lbs (84 kg), Combs played the positions of wide receiver and linebacker in football, guard in basketball and outfielder in baseball. In football, Combs was named Second Team All-SIAC in 2016 and Courier & Press All-Metro Co-Player of the Year in 2018. He was rated a three-star recruiting prospect by 247Sports.com. In his senior season, Combs set a record in all receiving categories including 75 passes caught for 1,517 yards and 24 touchdowns.

== College career ==
=== Southern Illinois ===
Combs enrolled at Southern Illinois University in 2019 as a redshirt freshman. He joined the Salukis as a wide receiver for 4 games. In the 2020 season, Combs played in all 10 games and made 2 starts against North Dakota State and Youngstown State respectively. He placed 5th on the team with 12 catches, including 2 touchdowns. 2020 was the last season during which Combs would play as a wide receiver. He joined the Salukis on the field as a linebacker for the 2021 season. During the season, Combs played in 11 games and made 2 starts, including games against Missouri State and North Dakota State and totaled 29 tackles.

During his sophomore season in 2022, Combs placed 2nd on the team in tackles, recording 57. He placed 4th in tackle-for-loss at 5.5, and 5th in sacks at 2.5. For his performances playing in all 11 games of the season, Combs was named 2nd-Team All-MVFC. In his junior season in 2023, Combs played starting linebacker in all 13 games. He recorded a season high of 12 tackles during the game against Missouri State. Combs finished the 2023 season with a total of 86 tackles, being named 2nd-Team All-MVFC for the second consecutive year. While he attended Southern Illinois, Combs majored in marketing.

=== Wake Forest ===
Combs transferred to Wake Forest University for his sixth and final season of college football. He joined the field with the Demon Deacons in the winning game against North Carolina A&T, where he finished the game with four total tackles and one sack. Combs ended the 2024 season with 10 starts out of 11 games and a season total of 96 tackles, placing 2nd on the team. He placed 4th on the team with 6.0 tackles-for-loss. For his first and only season with Wake Forest, Combs was named to the All-ACC Second Team.

== Professional career ==
Pre-draft measurables
Height	Weight	Arm length	Hand span	Wingspan	40-yard dash	10-yard split	20-yard split	20-yard shuttle	Three-cone drill	Vertical jump	Broad jump	Bench press
6 ft 3 in (1.91 m)	231 lb (105 kg)	31 1/4 in (0.79 m)	9 in (0.23 m)	6 ft 4 in (1.93 m)	4.67 s	1.53 s	2.62 s	4.41 s	7.08 s	34.0 in (0.86 m)	10 ft 2 in (3.10 m)	19 reps
All values from Pro Day

On April 26, 2025, Combs was signed by the Jacksonville Jaguars as an undrafted free agent following the 2025 NFL draft. Combs made hometown history when he became the second player from Evansville to join the NFL since former North Evansville high school player Deke Cooper in 2007. Cooper also had a stint with Jacksonville. He was relegated to the practice squad following the active roster cuts made on August 27. On November 15, Combs was signed to the active roster.

== Personal life ==
Combs credits his father for being instrumental to his love and passion for football and general sports. He also named Luke Kuechly as a player whose preparation and study of football he strongly respects and admires.
