= 2022 North Dakota Fighting Hawks football team =

American college football season

2022 North Dakota Fighting Hawks football

NCAA Division I First Round, L 31–38 at Weber State
- Conference: Missouri Valley Football Conference

Ranking
- STATS: No. 20
- Record: 7–5 (5–3 MVFC)
- Head coach: Bubba Schweigert (9th season)
- Offensive coordinator: Danny Freund (4th season)
- Offensive scheme: Pistol
- Defensive coordinator: Brett Holinka (3rd season)
- Base defense: 3–4
- Captains: Donny Ventrelli; Garett Maag; C.J. Siegel; Devin Krzanowski
- Home stadium: Alerus Center

2022 Missouri Valley Football Conference standings
	Conf.			Overall
Team	W		L	W		L
No. 1 South Dakota State $^	8	–	0	14	–	1
No. 2 North Dakota State ^	7	–	1	12	–	3
No. 20 North Dakota ^	5	–	3	7	–	5
Youngstown State	5	–	3	7	–	4
Northern Iowa	5	–	3	6	–	5
Illinois State	4	–	4	6	–	5
Southern Illinois	4	–	4	5	–	6
Missouri State	3	–	5	5	–	6
South Dakota	2	–	6	3	–	8
Indiana State	1	–	7	2	–	9
Western Illinois	0	–	8	0	–	11
$ – Conference champion; ^ – FCS playoff participant; Rankings from STATS Poll

The 2022 North Dakota Fighting Hawks football team represented the University of North Dakota as a member of the Missouri Valley Football Conference (MVFC) during the 2022 NCAA Division I FCS football season. Led by ninth-year head coach Bubba Schweigert, the Fighting Hawks compiling an overall record of 7–5 with a mark of 5–3 in conference play, placing in a three-way tie for third in the MVFC. North Dakota received an at-large bid to the NCAA Division I Football Championship playoff, losing to Weber State in the first round. The team played home games at Alerus Center in Grand Forks, North Dakota.

== Schedule ==
Date	Time	Opponent	Rank	Site	TV	Result	Attendance
September 3	2:30 p.m.	at Nebraska*		Memorial Stadium; Lincoln, NE	BTN	L 17–38	86,590
September 10	3:00 p.m.	No. 24 Northern Iowa		Alerus Center; Grand Forks, ND	ESPN3	W 29–27	9,940
September 17	3:00 p.m.	at Northern Arizona*	No. 22	Walkup Skydome; Flagstaff, AZ	ESPN+	W 27–24	7,841
September 24	2:00 p.m.	at No. 24 Southern Illinois	No. 19	Saluki Stadium; Carbondale, IL	MidcoSN2/ESPN+	L 17–34	8,053
October 1	12:00 p.m.	No. 7 Missouri State^{†}		Alerus Center; Grand Forks, ND	MidcoSN/ESPN+	W 48–31	10,020
October 8	5:00 p.m.	at Youngstown State	No. 22	Stambaugh Stadium; Youngstown, OH	MidcoSN2/ESPN+	W 35–30	11,009
October 22	3:00 p.m.	No. 1 South Dakota State	No. 20	Alerus Center; Grand Forks, ND	MidcoSN/ESPN+	L 35–49	11,067
October 29	3:00 p.m.	Abilene Christian*	No. 23	Alerus Center; Grand Forks, ND	MidcoSN2/ESPN+	W 34–31	8,355
November 5	12:00 p.m.	at Indiana State	No. 21	Memorial Stadium; Terre Haute, IN	MidcoSN2/ESPN+	W 42–7	2,534
November 12	12:00 p.m.	South Dakota	No. 19	Alerus Center; Grand Forks, ND (Sitting Bull Trophy)	MidcoSN/ESPN+	W 28–19	9,516
November 19	2:30 p.m.	at No. 4 North Dakota State	No. 16	Fargodome; Fargo, ND (Nickel Trophy)	MidcoSN2/ESPN+	L 21–42	18,806
November 26	3:00 p.m.	at No. 9 Weber State*	No. 20	Stewart Stadium; Ogden, UT (NCAA Division I First Round)	ESPN+	L 31–38	4,495
*Non-conference game; ^{†}Homecoming; Rankings from STATS Poll released prior to the game; All times are in Central time

== Game summaries ==
=== Regular season ===
==== at Nebraska (FBS) ====
North Dakota Fighting Hawks (0–0) at Nebraska Cornhuskers (FBS) (0–1) – Game summary

Quarter	1	2	3	4	Total
Fighting Hawks	0	7	10	0	17
Cornhuskers (FBS)	7	0	17	14	38

at Memorial Stadium • Lincoln, Nebraska

- Date: September 3
- Game time: 2:30 p.m.
- Game weather: Sunny, 79 °F (26 °C)
- Game attendance: 86,590
- Referee: Bryan Banks
- TV announcers (BTN): Brandon Gaudin (play-by-play), Joshua Perry (analyst), and Rick Pizzo (sideline reporter)
- Box score, Recap

Game information

First quarter

- (6:46) NEB – Anthony Grant 19-yard run, Timmy Bleekrode kick (Drive: 8 plays, 87 yards, 2:02; Nebraska 7–0)

Second quarter

- (0:13) UND – Adam Zavalney 1-yard pass from Tommy Schuster, Brady Stevens kick (Drive: 16 plays, 80 yards, 6:51; Tied 7–7)

Third quarter

- (13:12) NEB – Nate Boerkircher 19-yard pass from Casey Thompson, Timmy Bleekrode kick (Drive: 6 plays, 75 yards, 1:48; Nebraska 14–7)
- (8:36) NEB – Timmy Bleekrode 46-yard field goal (Drive: 5 plays, 18 yards, 0:56; Nebraska 17–7)
- (5:52) UND – Brady Stevens 23-yard field goal (Drive: 6 plays, 69 yards, 2:44; Nebraska 17–10)
- (4:22) UND – Tyler Hoosman 5-yard run, Brady Stevens kick (Drive: 2 plays, 8 yards, 0:44; Tied 17–17)
- (2:30) NEB – Anthony Grant 46-yard run, Timmy Bleekrode kick (Drive: 5 plays, 75 yards, 1:48; Nebraska 24–17)

Fourth quarter

- (6:35) NEB – Ajay Allen 14-yard run, Timmy Bleekrode kick (Drive: 11 plays, 89 yards, 4:25; Nebraska 31–17)
- (2:07) NEB – Chancellor Brewington 5-yard pass from Casey Thompson, Timmy Bleekrode kick (Drive: 6 plays, 33 yards, 3:31; Nebraska 38–17)

Statistics	UND	NEB
First downs	18	26
Plays–yards	70–306	62–437
Rushes–yards	33–175	41–224
Passing yards	131	193
Passing: comp–att–int	24–37–0	14–21–1
Time of possession	36:01	23:59

Team	Category	Player	Statistics
North Dakota	Passing	Tommy Schuster	24/37, 131 yards, 1 TD
North Dakota	Rushing	Isaiah Smith	10 carries, 104 yards
North Dakota	Receiving	Bo Belquist	6 receptions, 40 yards
Nebraska	Passing	Casey Thompson	14/21, 193 yards, 2 TD, 1 INT
Nebraska	Rushing	Anthony Grant	23 carries, 189 yards, 2 TD
Nebraska	Receiving	Trey Palmer	4 receptions, 82 yards

==== vs No. 24 Northern Iowa ====
	1	2	3	4	Total
No. 24 Panthers	3	7	3	14	27
Fighting Hawks	7	0	7	15	29

==== At Northern Arizona ====
	1	2	3	4	Total
No. 22 Fighting Hawks	0	13	0	14	27
Lumberjacks	7	7	0	10	24

==== At No. 24 Southern Illinois ====
	1	2	3	4	Total
No. 19 Fighting Hawks	0	10	0	7	17
No. 24 Salukis	10	14	7	3	34

==== vs No. 7 Missouri State ====
	1	2	3	4	Total
No. 7 Bears	7	14	0	10	31
Fighting Hawks	3	17	14	14	48

==== At Youngstown State ====
	1	2	3	4	Total
No. 22 Fighting Hawks	14	7	0	14	35
Penguins	3	18	3	6	30

==== vs No. 1 South Dakota State ====
	1	2	3	4	Total
No. 1 Jackrabbits	7	7	21	14	49
No. 20 Fighting Hawks	14	7	0	14	35

==== vs Abilene Christian ====
	1	2	3	4	Total
Wildcats	7	7	10	7	31
No. 23 Fighting Hawks	3	17	7	7	34

==== At Indiana State ====
	1	2	3	4	Total
No. 21 Fighting Hawks	7	14	14	7	42
Sycamores	0	7	0	0	7

==== vs South Dakota ====
	1	2	3	4	Total
Coyotes	6	7	0	6	19
No. 19 Fighting Hawks	7	7	14	0	28

==== At No. 4 North Dakota State ====
	1	2	3	4	Total
No. 16 Fighting Hawks	0	14	7	0	21
No. 4 Bison	14	14	14	0	42

=== NCAA Division I playoffs ===
==== At No. 9 Weber State (first round) ====
	1	2	3	4	Total
No. 20 Fighting Hawks	0	14	3	14	31
No. 9 Wildcats	7	24	7	0	38

== Roster ==
2022 North Dakota Fighting Hawks football team roster
Players
Coaches
Offense

Pos.	#	Name	Class
WR	1	Bo Belquist	Jr
QB	2	Tommy Schuster	Jr
QB	3	Trey Feeney	Fr
QB	6	Simon Romfo	Fr
RB	7	Luke Skokna	Sr
QB	9	Colton Hackel	Fr
WR	10	Caden Dennis	Fr
WR	12	Marcus Preston	Jr
WR	13	Jack Wright	So
QB	14	Quincy Vaughn	Jr
WR	16	Elijah Klein	So
WR	18	Red Wilson	Jr
WR	19	Noah Schaffner	Fr
RB	20	Creighton Mitchell	So
WR	25	Trasen Pollman	Fr
RB	28	Gaven Ziebarth	Fr
RB	29	Isaiah Smith	So
TE	30	Jack Ihry	Fr
RB	32	Tyler Hoosman	GS
WR	33	Garrin Sattler	Fr
RB	37	Anthony Moe-Tucker	Fr
RB	38	Grant Romfo	Fr
TE	39	Adam Zavalney	Jr
TE	40	Haydn Stay	Fr
TE	43	Jaden Norby	So
TE	44	Mason South	Fr
TE	46	Josh Yon	Fr
OL	60	Jagger Ferden	So
OL	61	Danny Carroll	Fr
OL	62	Jake Oliphant	GS
OL	64	Adam Neustel	Jr
OL	65	Bennett Weber	So
OL	67	Liam Becher	Fr
OL	68	Brayden Bryant	So
OL	69	Cade Borud	Fr
OL	71	Seth Anderson	So
OL	72	Colin Lavell	Jr
OL	73	Jack Kuntz	So
OL	74	Donny Ventrelli (C)	Sr
OL	75	Sam Hagen	Fr
OL	76	Brett Kelzenberg	Fr
OL	77	Easton Kilty	So
OL	78	Ben Christian	Sr
OL	79	Peyton Lotysz	So
WR	80	Nick Kupfer	Fr
WR	81	Sam Strandell	Fr
TE	82	Trace Thaden	Fr
WR	83	Tyler Burian	Sr
WR	84	Nate DeMontagnac	Fr
TE	85	Trae Steckler	Sr
TE	86	Max Gunderson	So
WR	89	Garett Maag (C)	GS

Defense

Pos.	#	Name	Class
DL	0	Jalen Morrison	GS
DB	3	C.J. Siegel (C)	Sr
DB	4	Malachi Buckner	Sr
DB	5	Clayton Bishop	Fr
DB	8	Edmund Ocansey	Fr
LB	9	Marcus Vaughn-Jones	Sr
LB	10	Caden White	Sr
DB	11	Jayson Coley	Jr
LB	15	Aaron Cooper	GS
DB	17	Jamal Dixon	Fr
DB	21	Sammy Fort	Jr
DB	22	Antonio Bluiett	Fr
DB	23	Devin Hembry	Jr
DB	24	Kadon Kauppinen	Sr
DB	25	Teagan Pfeffer	Fr
LB	26	Paine Parks	Fr
DB	27	Richard Agyekum	So
DB	28	Matt Koshiol	Jr
DB	30	Peyton Fisher	So
DB	31	Cole Davis	Fr
LB	32	Dylan Boecker	So
DB	33	Jett Sutton	Fr
LB	34	Josh Navratil	Jr
DB	35	Ethan Ball	So
LB	36	Malachi McNeal	Fr
LB	42	Kason Kelley	So
LB	44	Devin Krzanowski (C)	GS
LB	45	Hayden Stec	Fr
LB	46	Ted Mullin (C)	Sr
DL	47	Bartholomew Ogbu	Sr
LB	48	Jack Baretz	Fr
DL	49	Ben McNaboe	Jr
LB	50	Tommy Kimball	Jr
DL	51	Caleb Olson	Fr
LB	52	Logan Doell	Fr
LB	54	Jaden Feterl	Fr
DL	55	Lucas Schweigert	Fr
DL	57	Casey Schultz	Fr
DL	58	Tanner Thorsness	Jr
LB	59	Wyatt Pedigo	So
LB	66	Brady Lehman	Fr
DL	88	Luke Lennon	Jr
DL	90	Craig Orlando	So
DL	91	Jack Teiken	Fr
DL	93	Elijah Beach	Jr
DL	95	Steven Keech	Jr
DL	98	Kendis Ledbetter	Fr
DL	99	Jaelen Johnson	Sr

Special teams

Pos.	#	Name	Class
K	37	Sean Fenelon	GS
K, P	53	C.J. Elrichs	Fr
LS	63	David Neuberger	Fr
P, K	85	Luke Silvernale	Fr
P	87	Cade Peterson	GS
K	92	Brady Stevens	Sr

Head coach

- Bubba Schweigert

Coordinators/assistant coaches

- Danny Freund – Offensive coordinator/quarterbacks
- Brett Holinka – Defensive coordinator/linebackers
- Shawn Kostich – Special teams coordinator/tight ends/fullbacks
- Austin Flyger – Defensive line
- Sam King – Wide receivers
- Joe Pawlak – Offensive line
- Travis Stepps – Defensive backs
- Steve Crutchley – Running backs
- Joel Schwenzfeier – Recruiting coordinator/safeties
- Carl Reinholz – Defensive assistant/video coordinator/inside linebackers/camps
- Nate Baukol – Director of strength & conditioning
- Travis Kahlbaugh – Director of football operations
- Joe Caulfield – Director of player personnel & football office operations

Legend

- (C) Team captain
- (S) Suspended
- (I) Ineligible
- Injured
- Redshirt

Roster
