= 2022 Southern Illinois Salukis football team =

American college football season

2022 Southern Illinois Salukis football
- Conference: Missouri Valley Football Conference
- Record: 5–6 (4–4 MVFC)
- Head coach: Nick Hill (7th season)
- Offensive coordinator: Blake Rolan (4th season)
- Defensive coordinator: Jason Petrino (4th season)
- Home stadium: Saluki Stadium

2022 Missouri Valley Football Conference standings
| | Conf. | | | Overall |
| Team | W | | L | W | | L |
|---|---|---|---|---|---|---|
| No. 1 South Dakota State $^ | 8 | – | 0 | 14 | – | 1 |
| No. 2 North Dakota State ^ | 7 | – | 1 | 12 | – | 3 |
| No. 20 North Dakota ^ | 5 | – | 3 | 7 | – | 5 |
| Youngstown State | 5 | – | 3 | 7 | – | 4 |
| Northern Iowa | 5 | – | 3 | 6 | – | 5 |
| Illinois State | 4 | – | 4 | 6 | – | 5 |
| Southern Illinois | 4 | – | 4 | 5 | – | 6 |
| Missouri State | 3 | – | 5 | 5 | – | 6 |
| South Dakota | 2 | – | 6 | 3 | – | 8 |
| Indiana State | 1 | – | 7 | 2 | – | 9 |
| Western Illinois | 0 | – | 8 | 0 | – | 11 |
$ – Conference champion; ^ – FCS playoff participant; Rankings from STATS Poll

The 2022 Southern Illinois Salukis football team represented Southern Illinois University Carbondale as a member of the Missouri Valley Football Conference (MVFC) during the 2022 NCAA Division I FCS football season. Led by seventh-year head coach Nick Hill, the Salukis played their home games at Saluki Stadium in Carbondale, Illinois.

== Schedule ==
| Date | Time | Opponent | Rank | Site | TV | Result | Attendance |
|---|---|---|---|---|---|---|---|
| September 3 | 6:00 p.m. | at No. 14 Incarnate Word* | No. 9 | Gayle and Tom Benson Stadium; San Antonio, TX | ESPN+ | L 29–64 | 2,656 |
| September 10 | 6:00 p.m. | Southeast Missouri State* | No. 17 | Saluki Stadium; Carbondale IL | ESPN3 | L 31–34 | 8,662 |
| September 17 | 11:00 a.m. | at Northwestern* | | Ryan Field; Evanston, IL | BTN | W 31–24 | 23,146 |
| September 24 | 2:00 pm | No. 19 North Dakota | No. 24 | Saluki Stadium; Carbondale, IL | ESPN+ | W 34–17 | 8,053 |
| October 1 | 6:30 p.m. | at Illinois State | No. 19 | Hancock Stadium; Normal, IL | Marquee | W 19–14 | 11,127 |
| October 8 | 2:00 p.m. | at No. 20 Missouri State | No. 17 | Robert W. Plaster Stadium; Springfield, MO | ESPN+ | W 38–21 | 7,061 |
| October 15 | 2:00 p.m. | Western Illinois | No. 16 | Saluki Stadium; Carbondale, IL | ESPN+ | W 30–7 | 10,118 |
| October 22 | 2:00 p.m. | at South Dakota | No. 14 | DakotaDome; Vermillion, SD | ESPN+ | L 24–27 | 7,599 |
| October 29 | 2:00 pm | Northern Iowa | No. 20 | Saluki Stadium; Carbondale, IL | ESPN3 | L 36–37 | 6,155 |
| November 12 | 1:00 p.m. | No. 4 North Dakota State | | Saluki Stadium; Carbondale, IL | ESPN+ | L 18–21 | 4,575 |
| November 19 | 11:00 a.m. | at Youngstown State | | Stambaugh Stadium; Youngstown, OH | ESPN3 or ESPN+ | L 21–28 | |
*Non-conference game; Rankings from STATS Poll released prior to the game; All times are in Central time
