= 2022 Illinois State Redbirds football team =

American college football season

2022 Illinois State Redbirds football
- Conference: Missouri Valley Football Conference
- Record: 6–5 (4–4 MVFC)
- Head coach: Brock Spack (14th season)
- Offensive coordinator: Tony Petersen (1st season)
- Defensive coordinator: Travis Niekamp (5th season)
- Home stadium: Hancock Stadium

2022 Missouri Valley Football Conference standings
	Conf.			Overall
Team	W		L	W		L
No. 1 South Dakota State $^	8	–	0	14	–	1
No. 2 North Dakota State ^	7	–	1	12	–	3
No. 20 North Dakota ^	5	–	3	7	–	5
Youngstown State	5	–	3	7	–	4
Northern Iowa	5	–	3	6	–	5
Illinois State	4	–	4	6	–	5
Southern Illinois	4	–	4	5	–	6
Missouri State	3	–	5	5	–	6
South Dakota	2	–	6	3	–	8
Indiana State	1	–	7	2	–	9
Western Illinois	0	–	8	0	–	11
$ – Conference champion; ^ – FCS playoff participant; Rankings from STATS Poll

The 2022 Illinois State Redbirds football team represented Illinois State University as a member of the Missouri Valley Football Conference (MVFC) during the 2022 NCAA Division I FCS football season. Led by 14th-year head coach Brock Spack, the Redbirds compiled an overall record of 6–5 with a mark of 4–4 in conference play, tying for sixth place in the MVFC. Illinois State played home games at Hancock Stadium in Normal, Illinois.

== Schedule ==
Date	Time	Opponent	Site	TV	Result	Attendance
September 3	6:00 p.m.	at No. 18 (FBS) Wisconsin*	Camp Randall Stadium; Madison, WI	FS1	L 0–38	73,727
September 10	6:30 p.m.	Valparaiso*	Hancock Stadium; Normal, IL	Marquee/ESPN+	W 28–21	6,937
September 17	6:30 p.m.	Eastern Illinois*	Hancock Stadium; Normal, IL (Mid-America Classic)	Marquee/ESPN+	W 35–7	8,208
October 1	6:30 p.m.	No. 19 Southern Illinois	Hancock Stadium; Normal, IL	Marquee/ESPN+	L 14–19	11,127
October 8	4:00 p.m.	at Northern Iowa	UNI-Dome; Cedar Falls, IA	ESPN+	W 23–21	9,306
October 15	2:00 p.m.	South Dakota^{†}	Hancock Stadium; Normal, IL	ESPN3	W 12–10	9,302
October 22	12:00 p.m.	at Indiana State	Memorial Stadium; Terre Haute, IN	ESPN3	W 27–21	5,182
October 29	2:30 p.m.	at No. 4 North Dakota State	Fargodome; Fargo, ND	ESPN+	L 7–24	16,172
November 5	2:00 p.m.	Youngstown State	Hancock Stadium; Normal, IL	Marquee/ESPN+	L 17–19	4,989
November 12	2:00 p.m.	at No. 1 South Dakota State	Dana J. Dykhouse Stadium; Brookings, SD	ESPN+	L 7–31	8,160
November 19	11:00 a.m.	Western Illinois	Hancock Stadium; Normal, IL	Marquee/ESPN+	W 20–13 ^{OT}	2,579
*Non-conference game; ^{†}Homecoming; Rankings from STATS Poll released prior to the game; All times are in Central time

== Game summaries ==
=== At No. 18 (FBS) Wisconsin ===
Illinois State vs. Wisconsin – Game summary

Quarter	1	2	3	4	Total
Redbirds	0	0	0	0	0
No. 18 (FBS) Badgers	7	10	14	7	38

at Camp Randall Stadium, Madison, Wisconsin

- Date: September 3, 2022
- Game time: 6:10 p.m.
- Game weather: 70 °F (21 °C); Cloudy; Wind at NE10 MPH
- Game attendance: 73,727
- Referee: Larry Smith
- TV announcers (FS1): Tim Brando (play-by-play), Spencer Tillman (analyst)

Game information

First quarter

- WIS – John Torchio 100-yard interception return (Vito Calvaruso kick), 1:52 Wisconsin 7–0

Second quarter

- WIS – Braelon Allen 96-yard run (Vito Calvaruso kick), 13:15 Wisconsin 14–0 Drive: 1 play, 96 yards, 0:44.
- WIS – Vito Calvaruso 28-yard field goal, 3:11. Wisconsin 17–0. Drive: 13 plays, 68 yards, 7:42.

Third quarter

- WIS – Braelon Allen 1-yard run (Vito Calvaruso kick), 9:36 Wisconsin 24–0 Drive: 9 plays, 59 yards, 5:18.
- WIS – Chimere Dike 16-yard pass from Graham Mertz (Vito Calvaruso kick), 2:55. Wisconsin 31–0. Drive: 4 plays, 93 yards, 1:50.

Fourth quarter

- WIS – Isaac Guerendo 1-yard run (Vito Calvaruso kick), 8:57 Wisconsin 38–0 Drive: 14 plays, 76 yards, 7:26.

Top passers

- ISU – Zack Annexstad – 16/24, 186 yards, 2 INT
- WIS – Graham Mertz – 14/16, 219 yards, TD

Top rushers

- ISU – Nigel White – 4 rushes, 22 yards
- WIS – Braelon Allen – 14 rushes, 148 yards, 2 TD

Top receivers

- ISU – Daniel Sobkowicz – 2 receptions, 41 yards
- WIS – Chimere Dike – 3 receptions, 106 yards, TD

Top defenders

- ISU – Zeke Vandenburgh – 10 tackles, TFL, sack
- WIS – John Torchio – 3 tackles, TFL, sack, INT, TD

=== Valparaiso ===
	1	2	3	4	Total
Beacons	7	7	0	7	21
Redbirds	7	14	7	0	28

=== Eastern Illinois ===
	1	2	3	4	Total
Panthers	7	0	0	0	7
Redbirds	7	14	14	0	35

=== No. 19 Southern Illinois ===
	1	2	3	4	Total
No. 19 Huskies	0	19	0	0	19
Redbirds	0	0	7	7	14

=== At Northern Iowa ===
	1	2	3	4	Total
Redbirds	10	10	3	0	23
Panthers	7	7	0	7	21

=== South Dakota ===
	1	2	3	4	Total
Coyotes	0	7	3	0	10
Redbirds	3	3	6	0	12

=== At Indiana State ===
	1	2	3	4	Total
Redbirds	20	0	0	7	27
Sycamores	0	7	7	7	21

=== At No. 4 North Dakota State ===
Illinois State Redbirds (5–2) vs North Dakota State Bison (5–2)

Quarter	1	2	3	4	Total
Redbirds	7	0	0	0	7
No. 4 Bison	7	3	7	7	24

at Fargodome, Fargo, ND

- Date: October 29, 2022
- Game time: 2:30 p.m. (CT)
- Game weather: Indoors; 70 °F (21 °C)
- Game attendance: 16,172
- Referee: Grant Henderson
- TV: ESPN+

Statistics	Illinois State	North Dakota State
First downs	10	21
Plays–yards	50–219	68–373
Rushes–yards	28–76	37–192
Passing yards	143	181
Passing: comp–att–int	16–21–1	21–31–0
Time of possession	25:54	34:06

Team	Category	Player	Statistics
Illinois State	Passing	Zack Annexstad	16/22, 143 yds, TD, INT
Illinois State	Rushing	Pha'leak Brown	13 car, 41 yds
Illinois State	Receiving	Jalen Carr	4 rec, 42 yds
North Dakota State	Passing	Cam Miller	20/30, 174 yds, TD
North Dakota State	Rushing	Kobe Johnson	10 car, 51 yds
North Dakota State	Receiving	Braylon Henderson	4 rec, 67 yds

Scoring summary

Quarter	Time	Drive			Team	Scoring information	Score	
Quarter	Time	Plays	Yards	TOP	Team	Scoring information	ILL ST	NDSU
1st	3:24	9	75	4:17	ILL ST	Daniel Sobkowicz (#12) 13-yard touchdown reception from Zack Annexstad (#5), Ian Wagner (#31) kick good	7	0
1st	0:43	6	75	2:41	NDSU	Hunter Luepke (#44) 20-yard touchdown reception from Cam Miller (#7), Griffin Crosa (#39) kick good	7	7
2nd	0:04	9	41	2:00	NDSU	29-yard field goal by Griffin Crosa (#39)	7	10
3rd	7:45	6	44	2:58	NDSU	Cam Miller (#7) 4-yard touchdown run, Griffin Crosa (#39) kick good	7	17
4th	7:30	11	52	5:20	NDSU	Cole Payton (#15) 12-yard touchdown run, Griffin Crosa (#39) kick good	7	24
"TOP" = time of possession. For other American football terms, see Glossary of American football.							7	24

=== Youngstown State ===
	1	2	3	4	Total
Penguins	7	6	0	6	19
Redbirds	10	7	0	0	17

=== At No. 1 South Dakota State ===
	1	2	3	4	Total
Redbirds	7	0	0	0	7
No. 1 Jackrabbits	0	13	15	3	31

Statistics	ISU	SDSU
First downs	7	23
Total yards	100	431
Rushing yards	45	148
Passing yards	55	283
Turnovers	1	1
Time of possession	20:26	39:34

Team	Category	Player	Statistics
Illinois State	Passing	Tommy Rittenhouse	9/20, 55 yards, INT
Illinois State	Rushing	Tommy Rittenhouse	9 carries, 18 yards
Illinois State	Receiving	Daniel Sobkowicz	4 receptions, 32 yards
South Dakota State	Passing	Mark Gronowski	20/28, 283 yards, TD, INT
South Dakota State	Rushing	Isaiah Davis	16 carries, 50 yards, TD
South Dakota State	Receiving	Jadon Janke	5 receptions, 129 yards

=== Western Illinois ===
	1	2	3	4	OT	Total
Leathernecks	0	7	3	3	0	13
Redbirds	7	6	0	0	7	20
