= 2022 Indiana State Sycamores football team =

American college football season

2022 Indiana State Sycamores football
- Conference: Missouri Valley Football Conference
- Record: 2–9 (1–7 MVFC)
- Head coach: Curt Mallory (5th season)
- Offensive coordinator: Mike Bath (1st season)
- Defensive coordinator: Brad Wilson (5th season)
- Home stadium: Memorial Stadium

2022 Missouri Valley Football Conference standings
| | Conf. | | | Overall |
| Team | W | | L | W | | L |
|---|---|---|---|---|---|---|
| No. 1 South Dakota State $^ | 8 | – | 0 | 14 | – | 1 |
| No. 2 North Dakota State ^ | 7 | – | 1 | 12 | – | 3 |
| No. 20 North Dakota ^ | 5 | – | 3 | 7 | – | 5 |
| Youngstown State | 5 | – | 3 | 7 | – | 4 |
| Northern Iowa | 5 | – | 3 | 6 | – | 5 |
| Illinois State | 4 | – | 4 | 6 | – | 5 |
| Southern Illinois | 4 | – | 4 | 5 | – | 6 |
| Missouri State | 3 | – | 5 | 5 | – | 6 |
| South Dakota | 2 | – | 6 | 3 | – | 8 |
| Indiana State | 1 | – | 7 | 2 | – | 9 |
| Western Illinois | 0 | – | 8 | 0 | – | 11 |
$ – Conference champion; ^ – FCS playoff participant; Rankings from STATS Poll

The 2022 Indiana State Sycamores football team represented Indiana State University as a member of the Missouri Valley Football Conference (MVFC) during the 2022 NCAA Division I FCS football season. Led by fifth-year head coach Curt Mallory, the Sycamores compiled an overall record of 2–9 with a mark of 1–7 in conference play, placing tenth in the MVFC. Indiana State played home games at Memorial Stadium in Terre Haute, Indiana.

== Schedule ==
| Date | Time | Opponent | Site | TV | Result | Attendance |
|---|---|---|---|---|---|---|
| September 1 | 6:00 p.m. | North Alabama* | Memorial Stadium; Terre Haute, IN | ESPN+ | W 17–14 ^{OT} | 4,851 |
| September 10 | 4:00 p.m. | at Purdue* | Ross–Ade Stadium; West Lafayette, IN | BTN | L 0–56 | 53,676 |
| September 17 | 1:00 p.m. | No. 3 Montana* | Memorial Stadium; Terre Haute, IN | ESPN+ | L 14–49 | 5,929 |
| October 1 | 5:00 p.m. | at Northern Iowa | UNI-Dome; Cedar Falls, IA | ESPN+ | L 14–20 | 6,830 |
| October 8 | 1:00 p.m. | No. 1 North Dakota State | Memorial Stadium; Terre Haute, IN | ESPN+ | L 26–31 | 4,185 |
| October 15 | 2:00 p.m. | at Youngstown State | Stambaugh Stadium; Youngstown, OH | ESPN+ | L 42–48 | 9,326 |
| October 22 | 1:00 p.m. | Illinois State^{†} | Memorial Stadium; Terre Haute, IN | ESPN3 | L 21–27 | 5,182 |
| October 29 | 3:00 p.m. | at No. 1 South Dakota State | Dana J. Dykhouse Stadium; Brookings, SD | ESPN+ | L 7–49 | 19,041 |
| November 5 | 1:00 p.m. | No. 21 North Dakota | Memorial Stadium; Terre Haute, IN | ESPN+ | L 7–42 | 2,534 |
| November 12 | 2:00 p.m. | at Western Illinois | Hanson Field; Macomb, IL | ESPN+ | W 21–0 | |
| November 19 | 1:00 p.m. | Missouri State | Memorial Stadium; Terre Haute, IN | ESPN+ | L 7–24 | 2,575 |
*Non-conference game; ^{†}Homecoming; Rankings from STATS Poll released prior to the game; All times are in Eastern time

== Game summaries ==
=== North Alabama ===
| | 1 | 2 | 3 | 4 | OT | Total |
|---|---|---|---|---|---|---|
| Lions | 0 | 7 | 0 | 7 | 0 | 14 |
| Sycamores | 3 | 3 | 0 | 8 | 3 | 17 |

=== At Purdue ===
| | 1 | 2 | 3 | 4 | Total |
|---|---|---|---|---|---|
| Sycamores | 0 | 0 | 0 | 0 | 0 |
| Boilermakers | 21 | 14 | 14 | 7 | 56 |

=== No. 3 Montana ===
| | 1 | 2 | 3 | 4 | Total |
|---|---|---|---|---|---|
| No. 3 Grizzlies | 14 | 7 | 14 | 14 | 49 |
| Sycamores | 7 | 0 | 0 | 7 | 14 |

=== At Northern Iowa ===
| | 1 | 2 | 3 | 4 | Total |
|---|---|---|---|---|---|
| Sycamores | 0 | 3 | 3 | 8 | 14 |
| Panthers | 7 | 3 | 7 | 3 | 20 |

=== No. 1 North Dakota State ===
| | 1 | 2 | 3 | 4 | Total |
|---|---|---|---|---|---|
| No. 1 Bison | 0 | 10 | 14 | 7 | 31 |
| Sycamores | 0 | 13 | 7 | 6 | 26 |

=== At Youngstown State ===
| | 1 | 2 | 3 | 4 | Total |
|---|---|---|---|---|---|
| Sycamores | 14 | 14 | 14 | 0 | 42 |
| Penguins | 21 | 14 | 10 | 3 | 48 |

=== Illinois State ===
| | 1 | 2 | 3 | 4 | Total |
|---|---|---|---|---|---|
| Redbirds | 20 | 0 | 0 | 7 | 27 |
| Sycamores | 0 | 7 | 7 | 7 | 21 |

=== At No. 1 South Dakota State ===
| | 1 | 2 | 3 | 4 | Total |
|---|---|---|---|---|---|
| Sycamores | 0 | 7 | 0 | 0 | 7 |
| No. 1 Jackrabbits | 14 | 21 | 14 | 0 | 49 |

=== No. 21 North Dakota ===
| | 1 | 2 | 3 | 4 | Total |
|---|---|---|---|---|---|
| No. 21 Fighting Hawks | 7 | 14 | 14 | 7 | 42 |
| Sycamores | 0 | 7 | 0 | 0 | 7 |

=== At Western Illinois ===
| | 1 | 2 | 3 | 4 | Total |
|---|---|---|---|---|---|
| Sycamores | 0 | 14 | 7 | 0 | 21 |
| Leathernecks | 0 | 0 | 0 | 0 | 0 |

=== Missouri State ===
| | 1 | 2 | 3 | 4 | Total |
|---|---|---|---|---|---|
| Bears | 7 | 3 | 0 | 14 | 24 |
| Sycamores | 0 | 7 | 0 | 0 | 7 |
