= 2022 Missouri State Bears football team =

American college football season

2022 Missouri State Bears football
- Conference: Missouri Valley Football Conference
- Record: 5–6 (3–5 MVFC)
- Head coach: Bobby Petrino (3rd season)
- Offensive coordinator: Nick Petrino (3rd season)
- Offensive scheme: Multiple
- Defensive coordinator: Ryan Beard (3rd season)
- Base defense: 3–4
- Captains: Landon Bebee; Jason Shelley; Kevin Ellis; Kyriq McDonald
- Home stadium: Robert W. Plaster Stadium

2022 Missouri Valley Football Conference standings
	Conf.			Overall
Team	W		L	W		L
No. 1 South Dakota State $^	8	–	0	14	–	1
No. 2 North Dakota State ^	7	–	1	12	–	3
No. 20 North Dakota ^	5	–	3	7	–	5
Youngstown State	5	–	3	7	–	4
Northern Iowa	5	–	3	6	–	5
Illinois State	4	–	4	6	–	5
Southern Illinois	4	–	4	5	–	6
Missouri State	3	–	5	5	–	6
South Dakota	2	–	6	3	–	8
Indiana State	1	–	7	2	–	9
Western Illinois	0	–	8	0	–	11
$ – Conference champion; ^ – FCS playoff participant; Rankings from STATS Poll

The 2022 Missouri State Bears football team represented Missouri State University as a member of the Missouri Valley Football Conference (MVFC) during the 2022 NCAA Division I FCS football season. Led by Bobby Petrino in his third and final season as head coach, the Bears compiled an overall record of 5–6 with a mark of 3–5 in conference play, placing eighth in the MVFC. Missouri State played home games at Robert W. Plaster Stadium in Springfield, Missouri.

== Schedule ==
Date	Time	Opponent	Rank	Site	TV	Result	Attendance
September 1	7:00 p.m.	at Central Arkansas*	No. 5	Estes Stadium; Conway, AR	ESPN+	W 27–14	10,277
September 8	7:00 p.m.	No. 14 UT Martin*	No. 5	Robert W. Plaster Stadium; Springfield, MO	ESPN+	W 35–30	9,872
September 17	6:00 p.m.	at No. 10 (FBS) Arkansas*	No. 5	Donald W. Reynolds Razorback Stadium; Fayetteville, AR	SECN+/ESPN+	L 27–38	74,133
September 24	2:00 p.m.	No. T–2 South Dakota State	No. 6	Robert W. Plaster Stadium; Springfield, MO	ESPN3	L 14–28	13,189
October 1	12:00 p.m.	at North Dakota	No. 7	Alerus Center; Grand Forks	ESPN+	L 31–48	10,020
October 8	2:00 p.m.	No. 17 Southern Illinois	No. 20	Robert W. Plaster Stadium; Springfield, MO	ESPN+	L 21–38	7,061
October 22	4:00 p.m.	Northern Iowa		UNI Dome; Cedar Falls, IA	ESPN+	L 20–41	8,809
October 29	2:00 p.m.	Western Illinois^{†}		Robert W. Plaster Stadium; Springfield, MO	ESPN+	W 64–14	10,712
November 5	1:00 p.m.	at South Dakota		DakotaDome; Vermillion, SD	ESPN3	L 13–20	5,341
November 12	2:00 p.m.	Youngstown State		Robert W. Plaster Stadium; Springfield, MO	ESPN3	W 25–22	5,148
November 19	12:00 p.m.	at Indiana State		Memorial Stadium; Terre Haute, IN	ESPN+	W 24–7	2,575
*Non-conference game; ^{†}Homecoming; Rankings from STATS Poll released prior to the game; All times are in Central time

== Rankings ==
Ranking movements Legend: ██ Increase in ranking ██ Decrease in ranking RV = Received votes т = Tied with team above or below
	Week													
Poll	Pre	1	2	3	4	5	6	7	8	9	10	11	12	Final
STATS FCS	5	5	5	6	7	20	RV							
Coaches	8	7	6	4т	9	19	RV							
Athlon Power Poll	5	5	5	5										

== Preseason ==
=== MVFC media poll ===
The media picked the Bears to finish in third place.

=== Preseason awards ===
Missouri State had eight players selected to the 2022 All-MVFC Preseason Team. Three from the defense, three from the offense, and two from the specialists. Seven players were picked to the first team and one to the second team.

==== Preseason All-MVFC Team ====
Preseason All-MFVC Team
Player	Team	Position	Year
Montrae Braswell	First Team	DB	JR
Landon Bebee	First Team	OL	JR
Jason Shelley	First Team	QB	SR
Kevin Ellis	First Team	DE	SR
Kyriq McDonald	First Team	DB	SR
Ty Scott	First Team	WR	JR
Grant Burkett	First Team	P	SO
Jose Pizano	Second Team	K	JR

==== Award watch lists ====
Award watch lists
Award	Player	Position	Year
FCS Punter of the Year	Grant Burkett	P	SO
Walter Payton Award	Jason Shelley	QB	SR
Buck Buchanan Award	Montrae Braswell	DB	Jr.

== Personnel ==
=== Coaching staff ===
Name	Position	Alma mater	Joined staff
Bobby Petrino	Head coach	Carroll College (1983)	2020
Ryan Beard	Defensive coordinator/ Safeties	Western Kentucky (2012)	2020
Nick Petrino	Offense coordinator / quarterbacks coach	Western Kentucky (2014)	2020
Austin Appleby	Wide receivers coach	Purdue (2015)	2020
Skyler Cassity	Inside linebackers coach	Auburn (2016)	2020
Nelson Fishback	Tight ends coach/ co-special teams coordinator	Western Kentucky (2015)	2020
Ronnie Fouch	Running backs coach/ recruiting coordinator/ co-special teams coordinator	Indiana State (2004)	2020
Max Halpin	Offensive line coach	Western Kentucky (2016)	2020
Reggie Johnson	Inside Linebackers	Louisville (1996)	2020
L.D. Scott	Defensive line coach/ run game coordinator	Louisville (2009)	2020
Tramain Thomas	Defensive backs coach	Arkansas (2013)	2020
Kevin Elliot	Outside linebackers coach	Concord (2013)	2022
Lynn Mentzer	Director of football operations	Coastal Carolina (2005)	2018

=== Roster ===
2022 Missouri State Bears Football Roster
Quarterback: 2 Jordan Pachot – (redshirt) sophomore (6'2, 195); 3 Jason Shelley – senior (5'11, 197); 10 Kaden McMullen – (redshirt) freshman (6'4, 210); 11 Hess Horne – (redshirt) freshman (6'2, 183); 12 Jacob Clark – sophomore (6'5, 217); 16 Reid Potts – (redshirt) freshman (6'3, 176); Running back: 4 Andrew Cunningham – junior (6'1, 225); 9 Jacardia Wright – sophomore (6'0, 220); 22 Jeremiah Johnson – sophomore (6'1, 213); 23 Tywuan Lee – (redshirt) freshman (6'2, 201); 31 Celdon Manning – sophomore (5'10, 187); 39 Sage White – freshman (5'8, 174); 41 Ahmias Hart – freshman (6'2, 218); Wide receiver: 0 Jmariyae Robinson – freshman (6'1, 170); 1 Jordan Jones – senior (6'2, 196); 5 Kevon Latulas – senior (6'0, 200); 6 Raylen Sharpe – sophomore (5'9, 172); 8 Larry Wright III – (redshirt) sophomore (6'4, 212); 13 Liam O'Reilly – freshman (6'2, 187); 15 Jahod Booker – (redshirt) senior (5'11, 190); 17 Isaiah Isaac – junior (5'10, 174); 18 Terique Owens – junior (6'3, 193); 19 Ty Scott – junior (6'3, 202); 80 Carter Harrell – freshman (6'4, 205); 84 DVontae Key – sophomore (5'10, 187); 88 Hunter Wood – sophomore (6'1, 204); Tight end: 14 Stetson Moore – (redshirt) junior (6'4, 250); 46 Cash Hudson – freshman (6'3, 272); 49 Carson Buddemeyer – sophomore (6'2, 241); 85 Lance Mason – freshman (6'3, 240); 87 Gary Clinton – sophomore (6'4, 244); 89 Cameron Paul – freshman (6'5, 230); Punter: 31 Grant Burkett – sophomore (6'1, 184)	Offensive lineman: 52 Thomas Schulte – freshman (6'1, 288); 53 Jeremiah Carter – junior (6'6, 301); 54 Tevita Fuimaono – junior (6'2, 300); 56 Ryan Suliafu – junior (6'2, 330); 57 Gilles Tchio − freshman (6'3, 301); 60 Sean Fitzgerald – (redshirt) senior (6'2, 307); 65 Ian Fitzgerald – junior (6'5, 299); 66 Grant Goodson – (redshirt) freshman (6'6, 296); 72 Mark Hutchinson – (redshirt) freshman (6'2, 290); 73 Landon Bebee – junior (6'3, 298); 74 Raveion Harrell – freshman (6'1, 300); 75 Ben Martinez – junior (6'3, 303); 76 Cristian Loaiza – freshman (6'5, 325); 77 Andrew Wiens – junior (6'5, 289); 79 Brett Harris – (redshirt) freshman (6'6, 293); Defensive lineman: 2 Tico Brown — DL – junior (6'2, 295); 14 Devin Goree – DE – sophomore (6'3, 250); 15 Kevin Ellis – DE – senior (6'4, 241); 33 Anthony Payne – DE – senior (6'2, 295); 34 Kaleb Peleki – DL – freshman (6'3, 269); 43 Caleb Dietlin – DE – (redshirt) freshman (6'3, 249); 44 Siale Suliafu – DL – freshman (6'0, 298); 52 Arian Bhat – DL – junior (6'2, 295); 90 Sterling Smithson – DL – (redshirt) freshman (6'3, 315); 91 Ja'Veo Toliver – DE – sophomore (6'5, 284); 92 Wesley Bazzle – DL – sophomore (6'0, 283); 94 Ikenna Ahumibe – DT – senior (6'0, 292); 95 Jalen Williams – DE – sophomore (6'4, 250); 96 Armon Wallace – DL – freshman (6'0, 292); 98 Jayson Caldwell – DL – freshman (6'6, 235); 99 Allen Love – DL – junior (6'2, 296); Long snapper: 61 Caden Bolz – sophomore (6'0, 219)	Linebacker: 5 Ferrin Manuleleua – senior (6'1, 219); 10 Tyrin Brooks – (redshirt) junior (6'1, 220); 17 Jared Lloyd – freshman (6'3, 225); 21 Steven Ward – sophomore (6'0, 217); 23 Lucas Eatman – sophomore (6'3, 230); 24 Trae Thompson – junior (6'1, 245); 26 Tahj Chambers – sophomore (6'2, 218); 27 Udoka Ezeani – (redshirt) freshman (6'2, 212); 30 Von Young – sophomore (6'0, 219); 32 Kilifi Leaaetoa – junior (6'1, 228); 35 Caleb Bouldin – freshman (5'11, 200); 36 Jordan Hoskins – (redshirt) freshman (6'0, 215); 40 Connor Lair – freshman (6'1, 220); Cornerback: 0 Kaunor Ashley – sophomore (5'10, 185); 3 DeAndre Washington – junior (6'2, 188); 4 Montrae Braswell – junior (6'0, 190); 7 Chukwuma Anusiem – junior (6'0, 195); 8 Jaylen Stewart – junior (6'3, 197); 11 Jamal McMurrin – (redshirt) junior (5'11, 185); 16 C.J. Crump – (redshirt) sophomore (6'0, 184); 20 Donovan Clark – sophomore (6'2, 194); 22 Lemondre Joe – sophomore (6'0, 174); 25 Caleb Blake – (redshirt) sophomore (6'0, 187); 28 Jahiel Blue-Smith – sophomore (5'9, 179); Safety: 1 Aaron Harris – senior (6'0, 193); 6 Kyriq McDonald – senior (6'0, 209); 9 Dillon Thomas – senior (6'2, 189); 12 P.J. Hall – sophomore (6'3, 200); 13 Todric McGee – (redshirt) freshman (6'1, 196); 29 J.J. O'Neal – freshman (6'2, 189); Placekicker: 37 Khaled Alasad – (redshirt) sophomore (5'8, 170); 38 Jose Pizano – junior (5'7, 215)
