= 2022 Northern Iowa Panthers football team =

American college football season

2022 Northern Iowa Panthers football
- Conference: Missouri Valley Football Conference
- Record: 6–5 (5–3 MVFC)
- Head coach: Mark Farley (22nd season)
- Co-offensive coordinators: Ryan Clanton (1st season); Bodie Reeder (1st season)
- Defensive coordinator: Randall McCray (1st season)
- Home stadium: UNI-Dome

2022 Missouri Valley Football Conference standings
	Conf.			Overall
Team	W		L	W		L
No. 1 South Dakota State $^	8	–	0	14	–	1
No. 2 North Dakota State ^	7	–	1	12	–	3
No. 20 North Dakota ^	5	–	3	7	–	5
Youngstown State	5	–	3	7	–	4
Northern Iowa	5	–	3	6	–	5
Illinois State	4	–	4	6	–	5
Southern Illinois	4	–	4	5	–	6
Missouri State	3	–	5	5	–	6
South Dakota	2	–	6	3	–	8
Indiana State	1	–	7	2	–	9
Western Illinois	0	–	8	0	–	11
$ – Conference champion; ^ – FCS playoff participant; Rankings from STATS Poll

The 2022 Northern Iowa Panthers football team represented the University of Northern Iowa as a member of the Missouri Valley Football Conference (MVFC) during the 2022 NCAA Division I FCS football season. Led by 22nd-year head coach Mark Farley, the Panthers compiled an overall record of 6–5 with a mark of 5–3 in conference play, placing in a three-way tie for third in the MVFC. The team played home games at the UNI-Dome in Cedar Falls, Iowa.

== Schedule ==
Date	Time	Opponent	Rank	Site	TV	Result	Attendance
September 3	12:00 p.m.	at Air Force*	No. 21	Falcon Stadium; Colorado Springs, CO	Altitude	L 17–48	31,180
September 10	3:00 p.m.	at North Dakota	No. 24	Alerus Center; Grand Forks, ND	ESPN3	L 27–29	9,940
September 17	4:00 p.m.	No. 8 Sacramento State*		UNI-Dome; Cedar Falls, IA	ESPN+	L 21–37	8,818
September 24	3:00 p.m.	at Western Illinois		Hanson Field; Macomb, IL	ESPN+	W 52–17	4,500
October 1	4:00 p.m.	Indiana State		UNI-Dome; Cedar Falls, IA	ESPN+	W 20–14	6,830
October 8	4:00 p.m.	Illinois State^{†}		UNI-Dome; Cedar Falls, IA	ESPN+	L 21–23	9,306
October 15	4:00 p.m.	Utah Tech*		UNI-Dome; Cedar Falls, IA	ESPN+	W 41–14	6,942
October 22	4:00 p.m.	Missouri State		UNI-Dome; Cedar Falls, IA	ESPN+	W 41–20	8,809
October 29	2:00 p.m.	at No. 20 Southern Illinois		Saluki Stadium; Carbondale, IL	ESPN3	W 37–36	6,155
November 5	4:00 p.m.	No. 1 South Dakota State		UNI-Dome; Cedar Falls, IA	ESPN+	L 28–31	9,449
November 19	1:00 p.m.	at South Dakota		DakotaDome; Vermillion, SD	ESPN+	W 58–14	5,490
*Non-conference game; ^{†}Homecoming; Rankings from STATS Poll released prior to the game; All times are in Central time

== Game summaries ==
=== At Air Force ===
	1	2	3	4	Total
No. 21 Panthers	3	0	0	14	17
Falcons	14	13	14	7	48

=== North Dakota ===
	1	2	3	4	Total
No. 24 Panthers	3	7	3	14	27
Fighting Hawks	7	0	7	15	29

=== No. 8 Sacramento State ===
	1	2	3	4	Total
No. 8 Hornets	7	17	3	10	37
Panthers	7	0	14	0	21

=== At Western Illinois ===
	1	2	3	4	Total
Panthers	0	17	21	14	52
Leathernecks	0	3	7	7	17

=== Indiana State ===
	1	2	3	4	Total
Sycamores	0	3	3	8	14
Panthers	7	3	7	3	20

=== Illinois State ===
	1	2	3	4	Total
Redbirds	10	10	3	0	23
Panthers	7	7	0	7	21

=== Utah Tech ===
	1	2	3	4	Total
Trailblazers	0	7	0	7	14
Panthers	10	24	7	0	41

=== Missouri State ===
	1	2	3	4	Total
Bears	0	7	7	6	20
Panthers	14	10	7	10	41

=== At No. 20 Southern Illinois ===
	1	2	3	4	Total
Panthers	7	21	3	6	37
No. 20 Salukis	10	7	12	7	36

=== No. 1 South Dakota State ===
	1	2	3	4	Total
No. 1 Jackrabbits	3	17	8	3	31
Panthers	0	14	7	7	28

=== At South Dakota ===
	1	2	3	4	Total
Panthers	21	28	6	3	58
Coyotes	0	7	0	7	14

== Roster ==
2022 Northern Iowa Panthers football team roster
Players
Coaches
Offense

Pos.	#	Name	Class
WR	1	Deion McShane	Sr
QB	3	Matthew Schecklman	Fr
WR	4	Quan Hampton	Sr
RB	7	Dom Williams	Sr
QB	10	Aidan Dunne	Fr
QB	12	Theo Day	Jr
WR	13	Tysen Kershaw	Fr
QB	14	Nate Martens	So
WR	15	Cael Loecher	Fr
QB	16	Matt Morrissey	So
WR	17	Logan Wolf	Jr
TE	18	Tate Storbeck	So
RB	20	Vance McShane	Sr
WR	23	Sam Schnee	Jr
RB	25	Harrison Bey-Buie	So
WR	26	Terrance Kamara	Fr
TE	28	Liam McComas	So
RB	31	Kendall Robinson	So
RB	37	Josh Jenkins	Fr
RB	40	Amauri Pesek-Hickson	So
TE	43	Dawson Fenton	So
TE	45	Layne Pryor	So
OL	51	Keean Kamerling	Fr
OL	59	Nate Timmons	Fr
OL	60	Carson Petlon	Fr
OL	61	Chase Arends	Jr
OL	62	Jackson Heeringa	Fr
OL	65	Blake Anderson	Fr
OL	66	Jordan Ver Meer	Fr
OL	67	Erik Sorensen	Sr
OL	69	Wes Hine	Fr
OL	70	Gavin Proudfoot	Fr
OL	71	Nick Ellis	GS
OL	72	Justin Peine	Sr
OL	74	Gunnar Kilen	Fr
OL	75	Jared Penning	So
OL	76	Ben Kuehnast	Fr
OL	77	Matthew Vanderslice	Sr
OL	78	Tristan Roper	So
OL	79	Hayden Amos	Fr
WR	80	Devell Washington	Fr
WR	81	Desmond Hutson	Fr
WR	82	Sergio Morancy	So
WR	83	Brady McCullough	Fr
TE	84	Jayden Scott	Jr
WR	85	Tay Norman	Fr
TE	86	Noah Abbott	So
WR	87	Quincy Morris	Fr
WR	88	Peter Udoibok	GS
TE	89	Alex Allen	Jr
TE, LS	93	Drew Clausen	Fr

Defense

Pos.	#	Name	Class
DB	0	Jevon Brekke	Sr
DB	1	Tate Sander	Fr
DL	2	Caden Houghtelling	Jr
DB	4	Keith Moko	Fr
DB	5	Korby Sander	GS
DB	7	Jordan Williams	So
DL	8	Devin Rice	Jr
DB	9	Benny Sapp III	Sr
DL	11	Cordarrius Bailey	Sr
CB	19	Stefan Black II	So
DB	21	Edwin Dearman	So
LB	22	Bryce Flater	Sr
DB	24	Johnathan Phenix	Jr
DB	27	Dewuan Mack	Fr
LB	29	Tucker Langenberg	Fr
DB	30	Mo Olowo	Fr
DB	32	Woo Governor	Jr
LB	33	Ben Belken	Fr
DB	34	Deven Foster	So
DB	35	Jordan McClom	Fr
DB	36	Ethan Copeland	Jr
DB	38	Damien Crumitie	GS
LB	39	Cameron Baker	So
LB	41	Spencer Cuvelier	Sr
DB	42	Dalesean Staley	Fr
LB	44	Peni Naulu	So
LB	46	Rayshaun Dallas	Fr
DB	47	Jahsiah Galvan	Fr
LB	48	Caleb Frazer	Fr
DL	49	Jake McLaughlin	So
LB	50	Tyler Schmitt	Fr
LB	52	Caden Palmer	Fr
DL	53	Colin Klatt	Jr
DL	54	Reed Snitker	So
DB	54	Rudy Stallman	Fr
DL	55	Brennan Sweeney	Fr
DL	57	Jack Kriebs	Fr
DL	58	Dylan Boles	GS
DL	68	Jet Solinger	Fr
DL	90	Ethan George	Fr
DL	91	Kody Timm	Fr
DL	92	Sean Wendel	Jr
DL	94	Carter Hewitt	Fr
DL	95	Derek Anderson	Fr
DL	96	Cannon Butler	Fr
DL	98	Tae Shon McDaniels	Fr
DL	99	Khristian Boyd	Jr

Special teams

Pos.	#	Name	Class
K	6	Calvin Jaworski	Fr
LS	56	Evan Knowler	Sr
LS	73	Isaiah Garman	Sr
K	91	Noah Pettinger	Fr
PK	97	Matthew Cook	Jr

Head coach

- Mark Farley

Coordinators/assistant coaches

- Ryan Clanton
  Offensive Coordinator / Offensive Line
- Bryce Paup
  Defensive Line
- Joe Ganz
  Wide Receivers
- Andrew Rosemark
  Director of Operations
- Atif Austin
  Running Backs
- Randall McCray
  Defensive Coordinator / Secondary
- Griffin McCarley
  Linebackers
- Bodie Reeder
  Offensive Coordinator / Quarterbacks
- Drew Tate
  Tight Ends
- Benny Sapp Jr.

Legend

- (C) Team captain
- (S) Suspended
- (I) Ineligible
- Injured
- Redshirt

Roster
Last update: August 31, 2023
