= Zeke Vandenburgh =

American football player (born 1999)

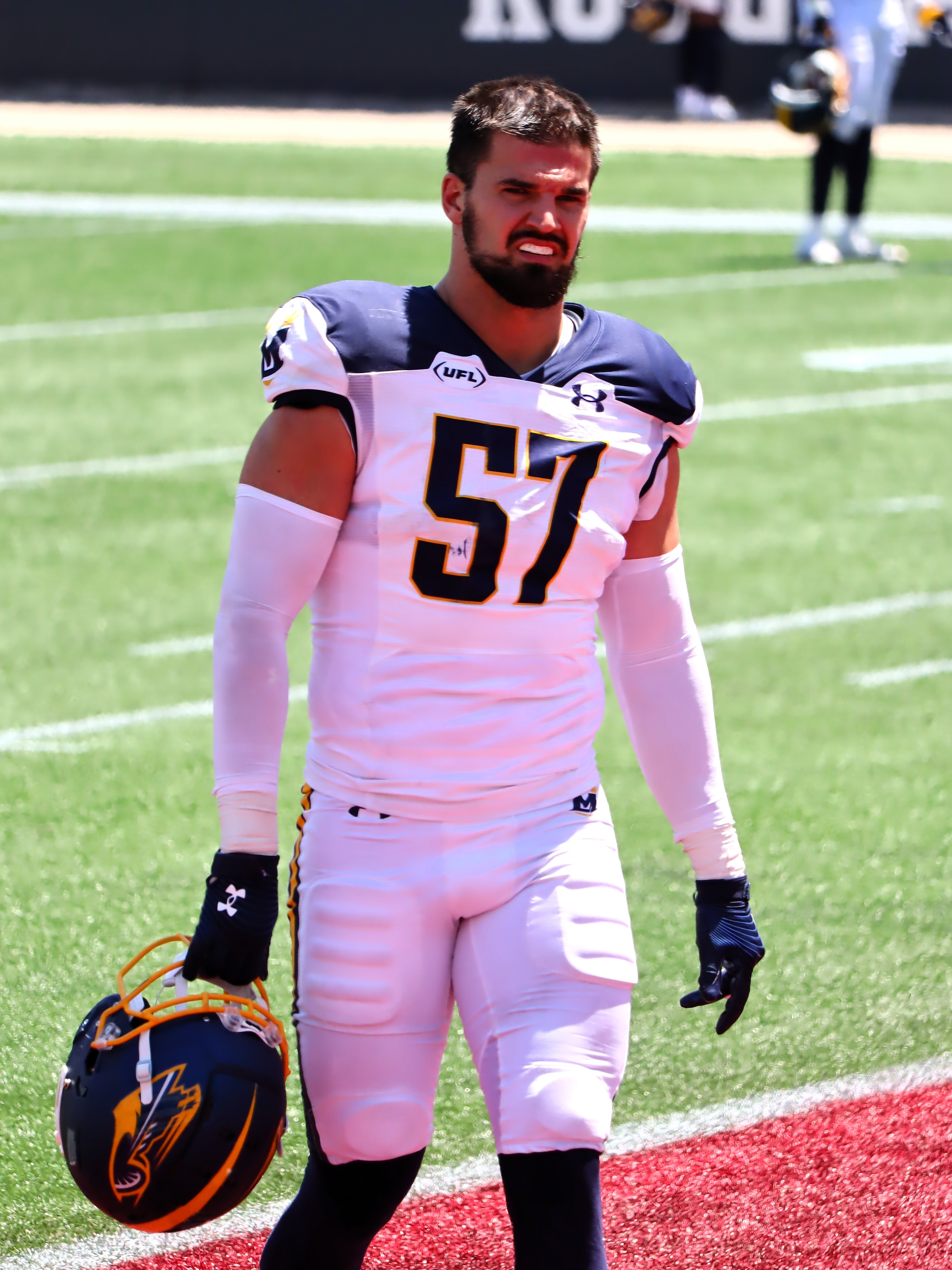
- Vandenburgh with the Memphis Showboats in 2025

Profile
- Position: Linebacker/Defensive lineman

Personal information
- Born: January 18, 1999 (age 27); Vallejo, California, U.S.
- Listed height: 6 ft 4 in (1.93 m)
- Listed weight: 232 lb (105 kg)

Career information
- High school: Freeport (Freeport, Illinois)
- College: Illinois State (2017–2022)
- NFL draft: 2023: undrafted

Career history
- Miami Dolphins (2023–2024); Memphis Showboats (2025); BC Lions (2026)*
- * Offseason or practice squad member only

Awards and highlights
- MVFC Defensive Player of the Year (2022); First-team All-MVFC (2022); Buck Buchanan Award (2022)
- Stats at Pro Football Reference

Ezekiel Vandenburgh (born January 18, 1999) is an American professional football linebacker/defensive lineman who is currently a free agent. He played college football for the Illinois State Redbirds.

== Early life ==
Vandenburgh was born on January 18, 1999, in Vallejo, California. He moved to Freeport, Illinois, where he attended and played high school football for Freeport High School. He was a three-year letterwinner and also recorded over 100 tackles as a senior. He was a First-Team All-Conference in 2016.

== College career ==
Vandenburgh played college football for Illinois State. He redshirted in 2017.

In 2018 he played in all eleven games at linebacker and finished his first season with 22 tackles and a season-best four tackles in a game against Southern Illinois.

In 2019 he was a Missouri Valley Football Conference (MVFC) All-Academic honorable mention team while also seeing playing time in all fifteen games. He finished the season with 51 tackles and nine tackles for loss. He recorded a half sack and four tackles in the second round of the FCS playoffs against Central Arkansas.

In 2020 the season was moved to the spring and was shortened to four games. He played in all four games and finished with thirteen tackles.

In the fall 2021 season he was once again MVFC All-Academic Team selection for a fourth-straight season. He started eleven games for the Redbirds and had 73 tackles and a team-leading four sacks. Against Northern Illinois he had a then-career-best fourteen tackles and was named MVFC Defensive Player of the Week.

In 2022 he started ten games for Illinois State while tallying a sack in eight of the ten games. Against Valparaiso, South Dakota State, and Western Illinois he had three-or-more sacks. In the season-finale against Western Illinois he also had a career-high seventeen tackles alongside the three-and-a-half sacks. After the season he was named the MVFC Defensive Player of the Year, First-Team All-MVFC, and also earned the prestigious Buck Buchanan Award for Division I FCS's best defensive player.

=== College statistics ===
Year	Team	Games	Defense								
Year	Team	GP	Solo	Ast	TOT	TFL	Sacks	Int	PD	FF	FR
2017	Illinois State	DNP									
2018	Illinois State	11	15	7	22	3.5	0.0	0	0	0	0
2019	Illinois State	15	37	14	51	9.5	5.0	0	0	0	0
2020–21	Illinois State	4	4	9	13	1.0	1.0	0	0	0	0
2021	Illinois State	11	44	26	70	8.5	4.0	0	2	0	0
2022	Illinois State	10	51	49	100	21.0	14.0	1	5	2	1
Career		51	151	105	256	43.5	24.0	1	7	2	1

== Professional career ==
Pre-draft measurables
Height	Weight	Arm length	Hand span	40-yard dash	10-yard split	20-yard split	20-yard shuttle	Three-cone drill	Vertical jump	Broad jump	Bench press
6 ft 3 3/4 in (1.92 m)	234 lb (106 kg)	31 5/8 in (0.80 m)	9 3/4 in (0.25 m)	4.80 s	1.62 s	2.74 s	4.42 s	7.06 s	34.5 in (0.88 m)	10 ft 2 in (3.10 m)	24 reps
All values from Pro Day

=== Miami Dolphins ===
On February 21, 2023, Vandenburgh was drafted 38th overall to the Birmingham Stallions of the United States Football League (USFL).

On May 12, 2023, Vandenburgh was signed by the Miami Dolphins as an undrafted free agent. On July 18, 2023, the Dolphins placed him on injured reserve. He was waived/injured on August 19, 2024.

=== Memphis Showboats ===
On January 23, 2025, Vandenburgh signed with the Memphis Showboats of the United Football League (UFL).

=== BC Lions ===
On March 3, 2026, Vandenburgh left the Showboats to sign as a defensive lineman with the BC Lions of the Canadian Football League (CFL). On May 9, 2026, Vandenburgh was released by Lions, during the team's first round of preseason roster cuts.

== Personal life ==
Vandenburgh married his wife, Leah, on March 18, 2023.
