= Myers Hendrickson =

American football coach (born 1989)

Current position
- Title: Senior analyst
- Team: Illinois
- Conference: Big Ten

Biographical details
- Born: April 13, 1989 (age 37); Atlanta, Georgia, U.S.

Playing career
- 2008–2010: Western Illinois
- Position: Wide receiver

Coaching career (HC unless noted)
- 2012: Auburn (DQC)
- 2013: Holmes (RB)
- 2014–2015: Kansas Wesleyan (QB/WR)
- 2016–2017: Coe (OC/QB)
- 2018: Northern State (OC/QB)
- 2019–2021: Kansas Wesleyan
- 2022–2023: Western Illinois
- 2024 (spring): FIU (analyst)
- 2024–present: Illinois (senior analyst)

Head coaching record
- Overall: 31–27
- Tournaments: 2–2 (NAIA playoffs)

Accomplishments and honors

Championships
- 2 KCAC (2019, 2021)

Myers Hendrickson (born April 13, 1989) is an American college football coach. He is a senior analyst for the University of Illinois Urbana-Champaign, a position he has held since 2024. He was the head football coach of Western Illinois University from 2022 to 2023. He was the head football coach at Kansas Wesleyan University from 2019 to 2021.

Hendrickson joined Matt Drinkall's staff at Kansas Wesleyan in 2014 as quarterback and wide receiver coach. Hendrickson returned to Kansas Wesleyan in 2019 after Dinkall announced his resignation to join the staff at Army as an offensive quality control coach. In the spring of 2024 he served as an analyst for FIU.

Hendrickson is the son of Mark Hendrickson, who was the head football coach at Western Illinois from 2008 to 2012.

== Head coaching record ==
| Year | Team | Overall | Conference | Standing | Bowl/playoffs | NAIA^{#} |
|---|---|---|---|---|---|---|
Kansas Wesleyan Coyotes (Kansas Collegiate Athletic Conference) (2019–2021)
| 2019 | Kansas Wesleyan | 12–1 | 10–0 | 1st | L NAIA Quarterfinal | 3 |
| 2020–21 | Kansas Wesleyan | 8–2 | 5–2 | T–3rd | | 25 |
| 2021 | Kansas Wesleyan | 11–2 | 9–1 | T–1st | L NAIA Quarterfinal | 10 |
| Kansas Wesleyan: | | 31–5 | 24–3 | | | |
Western Illinois Leathernecks (Missouri Valley Football Conference) (2022–2023)
| 2022 | Western Illinois | 0–11 | 0–8 | 11th | | |
| 2023 | Western Illinois | 0–11 | 0–8 | 12th | | |
| Western Illinois: | | 0–22 | 0–16 | | | |
| Total: | | 31–27 | | | | |
National championship Conference title Conference division title or championship game berth
