= 2022 Western Illinois Leathernecks football team =

American college football season

2022 Western Illinois Leathernecks football
- Conference: Missouri Valley Football Conference
- Record: 0–11 (0–8 MVFC)
- Head coach: Myers Hendrickson (1st season)
- Defensive coordinator: Todd Drury (1st season)
- Home stadium: Hanson Field

2022 Missouri Valley Football Conference standings
	Conf.			Overall
Team	W		L	W		L
No. 1 South Dakota State $^	8	–	0	14	–	1
No. 2 North Dakota State ^	7	–	1	12	–	3
No. 20 North Dakota ^	5	–	3	7	–	5
Youngstown State	5	–	3	7	–	4
Northern Iowa	5	–	3	6	–	5
Illinois State	4	–	4	6	–	5
Southern Illinois	4	–	4	5	–	6
Missouri State	3	–	5	5	–	6
South Dakota	2	–	6	3	–	8
Indiana State	1	–	7	2	–	9
Western Illinois	0	–	8	0	–	11
$ – Conference champion; ^ – FCS playoff participant; Rankings from STATS Poll

The 2022 Western Illinois Leathernecks football team represented Western Illinois University as member of the Missouri Valley Football Conference (MVFC) during the 2022 NCAA Division I FCS football season. Led by first-year head coach Myers Hendrickson, the Leathernecks compiled an overall record of 0–11 with a mark of 0–8 in conference play, placing last out of 11 teams in the MVFC. Western Illinois played home games at Hanson Field in Macomb, Illinois.

== Schedule ==
Date	Time	Opponent	Site	TV	Result	Attendance
September 1	6:00 p.m.	at No. 18 UT Martin*	Graham Stadium; Martin, TN	ESPN+	L 25–42	5,127
September 10	11:00 a.m.	at Minnesota*	Huntington Bank Stadium; Minneapolis, MN	BTN	L 10–62	43,859
September 17	3:00 p.m.	Southern Utah*	Hanson Field; Macomb, IL	ESPN+	L 10–17	5,024
September 24	3:00 p.m.	Northern Iowa	Hanson Field; Macomb, IL	ESPN+	L 17–52	4,500
October 1	2:00 p.m.	at No. 2 South Dakota State	Dana J. Dykhouse Stadium; Brookings, SD	ESPN+	L 10–34	15,237
October 15	2:00 p.m.	at No. 16 Southern Illinois	Saluki Stadium; Carbondale, IL	ESPN+	L 7–30	10,118
October 22	3:00 p.m.	Youngstown State	Hanson Field; Macomb, IL	ESPN+	L 27–28	7,217
October 29	2:00 p.m.	at Missouri State	Robert W. Plaster Stadium; Springfield, MO	ESPN+	L 14–64	10,712
November 5	1:00 p.m.	No. 4 North Dakota State	Hanson Field; Macomb, IL	ESPN+	L 17–56	2,534
November 12	12:00 p.m.	Indiana State	Hanson Field; Macomb, IL		L 0–21	2,661
November 19	12:00 p.m.	at Illinois State	Hancock Stadium; Normal, IL		L 13–20 ^{OT}	2,579
*Non-conference game; Rankings from STATS Poll released prior to the game

== Game summaries ==
=== At No. 18 UT Martin ===
	1	2	3	4	Total
Leathernecks	0	7	6	12	25
No. 18 Skyhawks	7	14	14	7	42

=== At Minnesota ===
	1	2	3	4	Total
Leathernecks	3	0	0	7	10
Golden Gophers	14	17	21	10	62

=== Southern Utah ===
	1	2	3	4	Total
Thunderbirds	10	0	0	7	17
Leathernecks	0	3	0	7	10

=== Northern Iowa ===
	1	2	3	4	Total
Panthers	0	17	21	14	52
Leathernecks	0	3	7	7	17

=== At No. 2 South Dakota State ===
	1	2	3	4	Total
Leathernecks	0	3	0	7	10
No. 2 Jackrabbits	10	7	3	14	34

=== At No. 16 Southern Illinois ===
	1	2	3	4	Total
Leathernecks	0	7	0	0	7
No. 16 Salukis	14	9	7	0	30

=== Youngstown State ===
	1	2	3	4	Total
Penguins	3	7	0	18	28
Leathernecks	0	7	6	14	27

=== At Missouri State ===
	1	2	3	4	Total
Leathernecks	0	7	0	7	14
Bears	17	28	10	9	64

=== No. 4 North Dakota State ===
	1	2	3	4	Total
No. 4 Bison	14	14	21	7	56
Leathernecks	0	10	0	7	17

=== Indiana State ===
	1	2	3	4	Total
Sycamores	0	14	7	0	21
Leathernecks	0	0	0	0	0

=== At Illinois State ===
	1	2	3	4	OT	Total
Leathernecks	0	7	3	3	0	13
Redbirds	7	6	0	0	7	20
