= Mark Farley =

American football player and coach (born 1963)

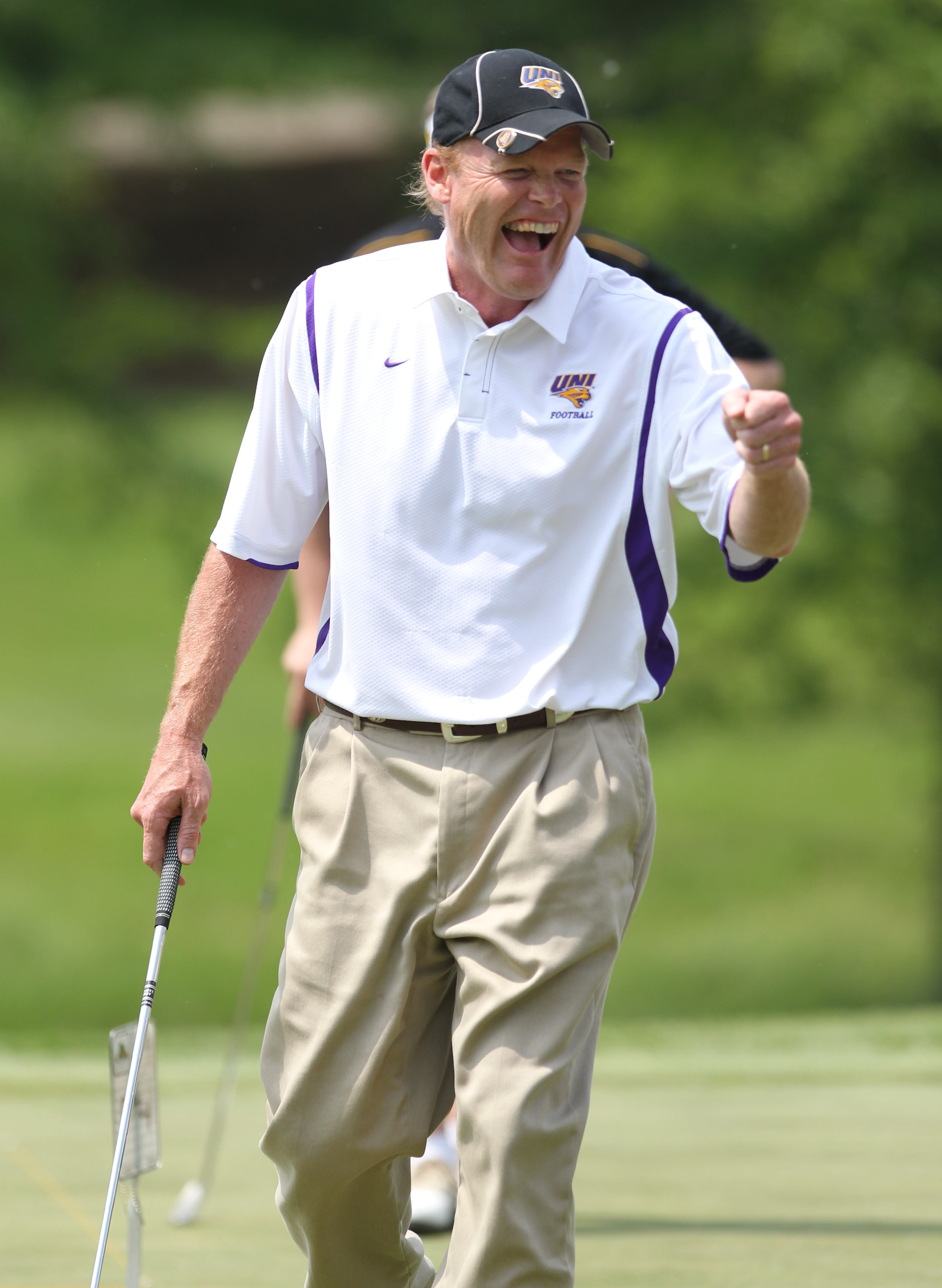
- Farley at the 2011 Principal Charity Classic

Current position
- Title: Offensive anaylst
- Team: Illinois
- Conference: Big Ten

Biographical details
- Born: April 5, 1963 (age 63); Waukon, Iowa, U.S.

Playing career
- 1983–1985: Northern Iowa

Coaching career (HC unless noted)
- 1986–1988: Northern Iowa (GA)
- 1989–1996: Northern Iowa (LB)
- 1997–2000: Kansas (LB)
- 2001–2024: Northern Iowa
- 2025–present: Illinois (OA)

Head coaching record
- Overall: 183–112
- Tournaments: 17–13 (NCAA D-I-AA/D-I playoffs)

Accomplishments and honors

Championships
- 7 MVFC (2001, 2003, 2005, 2007, 2008, 2010, 2011)

Awards
- Eddie Robinson Award (2007)

Mark Farley (born April 5, 1963) is an American college football coach. He was the head coach at the University of Northern Iowa, a position he held from 2001 until his retirement in 2024. Farley started at inside linebacker at Northern Iowa from 1983 to 1985. He led the team in tackles in 1984 and 1985, was named Gateway Football Conference Co-Defensive Player of the Year in 1985, first team all-conference three times, earned honorable mention All-America honors twice and twice named Academic All-American.

He then became an assistant at Northern Iowa. In 1989, he was named linebackers coach by new head coach Terry Allen. In 1997, he followed Allen to the University of Kansas, but left in 2001 when the head coaching position at his alma mater opened up. Acting as his own defensive coordinator, Farley's squads perennially rank among the top defense teams in the NCAA Football Championship Subdivision. In early 2008, Farley served as the interim director of athletics at Northern Iowa. With a win over in-state rival Iowa State on September 3, 2016, Farley passed Northern Iowa legend Stan Sheriff in all-time wins as a football coach. Farley notched his 150th Northern Iowa career win with a home victory over Southern Utah on September 7, 2019. He recorded his 175th win with a road victory at Idaho State on September 16, 2023. On November 10, 2024, Farley announced he would retire following the end of the season.

== Head coaching record ==
Year	Team	Overall	Conference	Standing	Bowl/playoffs	TSN/STATS^{#}	Coaches'^{°}
Northern Iowa Panthers (Gateway Football Conference / Missouri Valley Football Conference) (2001–2024)
2001	Northern Iowa	11–3	6–1	1st	L NCAA Division I-AA Semifinal		4
2002	Northern Iowa	5–6	2–5	T–6th			
2003	Northern Iowa	10–3	6–1	T–1st	L NCAA Division I-AA Quarterfinal		5
2004	Northern Iowa	7–4	5–2	3rd			25
2005	Northern Iowa	11–4	5–2	T–1st	L NCAA Division I-AA Championship		2
2006	Northern Iowa	7–4	5–2	T–2nd			17
2007	Northern Iowa	12–1	6–0	1st	L NCAA Division I Quarterfinal	5	4
2008	Northern Iowa	12–3	7–1	T–1st	L NCAA Division I-AA Semifinal	4	4
2009	Northern Iowa	7–4	5–3	T–3rd		18	18
2010	Northern Iowa	7–5	6–2	1st	L NCAA Division I First Round	18	19
2011	Northern Iowa	10–3	7–1	T–1st	L NCAA Division I Quarterfinal	5	6
2012	Northern Iowa	5–6	4–4	T–6th			
2013	Northern Iowa	7–5	3–5	T–7th			
2014	Northern Iowa	9–5	6–2	3rd	L NCAA Division I Second Round	10	10
2015	Northern Iowa	9–5	5–3	T–3rd	L NCAA Division I Quarterfinal	8	6
2016	Northern Iowa	5–6	4–4	T–4th			
2017	Northern Iowa	8–5	6–2	T–2nd	L NCAA Division I Second Round	19	19
2018	Northern Iowa	7–6	5–3	T–3rd	L NCAA Division I Second Round		
2019	Northern Iowa	10–5	6–2	2nd	L NCAA Division I Quarterfinal	5	5
2020–21	Northern Iowa	3–4	3–4	6th			
2021	Northern Iowa	6–6	4–4	6th	L NCAA Division I First Round	23	25
2022	Northern Iowa	6–5	5–3	T–3rd			
2023	Northern Iowa	6–5	5–3	T–3rd			
2024	Northern Iowa	3–9	1–7	10th			
Northern Iowa:		183–112	117–66				
Total:		183–112					
National championship Conference title Conference division title or championship game berth
