= Snell (surname) =

Snell is a Cornish surname.

== People ==
- Annette Snell (1945–1977), American R&B singer
- Belinda Snell (born 1981), Australian basketball player
- Benny Snell (born 1998), American football player
- Bertrand Snell (1870–1958), American politician
- Blake Snell (born 1992), American baseball player
- David Snell (disambiguation)
- Donald Snell (born 1965), American football player
- Earl Snell (1895–1947), American politician and Governor of Oregon
- Edward Fell Scott-Snell (1912–1988), English artist and illustrator
- Edward Snell (cricketer) (1906–1973) English cricketer
- Edward Snell (engineer) (1820–1880), British and Australian diarist, artist, engineer and surveyor
- Frida Snell (born 1981), Swedish pop/rock singer
- Edward Snell, mayor of Durban, South Africa (1856–1857, 1867–1868, 1868–1869)
- Gareth Snell (born 1986), British politician
- George Davis Snell (1903–1996), American geneticist and Nobel Prize winner
- Gordon Snell (1932–2026), British author of children's literature and scriptwriter
- Hannah Snell (1723–1792), British soldier
- Harold Snell (Darwin businessman) (1892–1949), Australian soldier, miner and businessman
- Harry Snell, 1st Baron Snell (1865–1944), British politician
- Henry B. Snell (1858–1943), English-American painter
- Henry Saxon Snell (1831–1904), British architect
- Howard Snell (born 1953), American ecologist and academic
- Howard Snell (musician) (born 1936), British trumpet player, composer and conductor
- Ian Snell (born 1981), American baseball player
- Joyce Snell (born 1930), British statistician
- J. Laurie Snell (1928–2011), American mathematician
- John Snell (disambiguation)
- Matt Snell (1941–2026), American professional football player
- Nicholas Snell (disambiguation), English politicians
- Peter Snell (1938–2019), New Zealand athlete
- Peter Snell (producer), Canadian film producer
- Princess Snell (born 1992), Filipina actress
- Richard Snell (disambiguation)
- Roderick Snell (born 1940), British electronics engineer
- Roy J. Snell (1878–1959), American writer
- Ted Snell (born 1946), Canadian ice hockey player
- Tony Snell (RAF officer) (1922–2013), RAF pilot and World War II escapee
- Tony Snell (poet) (born 1938), Cornish teacher, linguist, scholar, singer, waterman, and poet
- Tony Snell (basketball) (born 1991), American basketball player
- Wally Snell (1889–1980), American baseball player and mycologist
- Willebrord Snellius or Snell (1580–1626), Dutch mathematician (Snell's law)

== Fictional characters ==
- Balso Snell, in the 1931 novel The Dream Life of Balso Snell by Nathanael West
- Robert and Linda Snell, characters in The Archers, a radio soap opera
- Sue Snell, in the 1974 novel Carrie by Stephen King
- June Snell, appeared in Only Fools and Horses episodes "Happy Returns" & "A Royal Flush"
- Jacob & Darlene Snell, characters in Ozark, an American crime drama series on Netflix

== See also ==
- John Blashford-Snell, British explorer
- Snel and Snellen, Dutch versions of the surname
- Schnell, German version of the surname
