= Snellman =

Snellman may refer to:

- Snellman (surname)
- Snellman, Minnesota, unincorporated community in Becker County, Minnesota, United States

== See also ==
- Snelland
- Snellen (disambiguation)
