= Snel =

Snel is a Dutch surname. Snel means "quick" in Dutch. The origin of the surname often was patronymic, as Snel and Snelle were short forms of the archaic Germanic given name Snellaard (which originally meant "lively and strong"). People with this surname include:

- Han Snel (1925–1998), Dutch painter active in Indonesia
- Joseph-François Snel (1793–1861), Belgian composer, conductor and violinist
- Menno Snel (born 1970), Dutch D66 politician, Secretary of State for Finance 2017–
- Mick Snel (born 1993), Dutch korfball player
- Nikki Snel (born 1993), Belgian acrobatic gymnast
- Rudolph Snel van Royen (1546–1613), Dutch linguist and mathematician known as Snellius, father of Willebrord
- Willebrord Snel (1580–1626), Dutch astronomer and mathematician known as Snellius and, in England, as Snell
  - Snell's law, or the law of refraction, is named after him

== See also ==
- Snell (surname), English version of the surname
- Schnell, German version of the surname
- Snellen, Dutch surname with the same origin
- SNEL (disambiguation)
