= 2019 NCAA Division I Football Championship Game =

Postseason college football game

2019 NCAA Division I Football Championship
- FCS National Championship Game
Eastern Washington Eagles	North Dakota State Bison
(12–2)	(14–0)
Big Sky	MVFC
24	38
Head coach: Aaron Best	Head coach: Chris Klieman
STATS / Seed; 4 / 3	STATS / Seed; 1 / 1
	1	2	3	4	Total
Eastern Washington	0	10	7	7	24
North Dakota State	10	7	14	7	38
- Date: January 5, 2019
- Season: 2018
- Stadium: Toyota Stadium
- Location: Frisco, Texas
- MVP: Darrius Shepherd (WR, North Dakota State)
- Favorite: North Dakota State by 13.5
- Referee: Todd Boyd (CAA)
- Attendance: 17,802

United States TV coverage
- Network: ESPN2
- Announcers: Taylor Zarzour (play-by-play), Matt Stinchcomb (color), Kris Budden (sideline)

The 2019 NCAA Division I Football Championship Game was a postseason college football game that determined a national champion in the NCAA Division I Football Championship Subdivision for the 2018 season. It was played at Toyota Stadium in Frisco, Texas, on January 5, 2019, with kickoff at 12:00 noon EST, and was the culminating game of the 2018 FCS Playoffs.

== Teams ==
The participants of the 2019 NCAA Division I Football Championship Game were the finalists of the 2018 FCS Playoffs, which began with a 24-team bracket. North Dakota State and Eastern Washington qualified for the Championship by winning their semifinal games. North Dakota State was the designated home team for the game.

=== North Dakota State Bison ===
The Bison, led by fifth-year head coach Chris Klieman, finished the regular season 11–0 and received the No. 1 seed and a first-round bye in the FCS Playoffs. They defeated Montana State, No. 8 seed Colgate, and No. 5 seed South Dakota State to reach the Championship Game. This was North Dakota State's seventh Championship Game appearance; they entered the game with a 6–0 record in previous finals, with their last coming in the 2017 playoffs.

=== Eastern Washington Eagles ===
The Eagles, led by second-year head coach Aaron Best, finished the regular season 9–2 and received the No. 3 seed and a first-round bye in the FCS Playoffs. They defeated Nicholls, No. 6 seed UC Davis, and No. 7 seed Maine to reach the Championship Game. This was Eastern Washington's second Championship Game appearance; their only previous appearance was in the 2010 playoffs, which they won.

== Game summary ==
=== Scoring summary ===
Scoring summary

Quarter	Time	Drive			Team	Scoring information	Score	
Quarter	Time	Plays	Yards	TOP	Team	Scoring information	EWU	NDSU
1	6:50	13	60	8:10	NDSU	36-yard field goal by Cam Pedersen	0	3
1	1:47	4	68	1:52	NDSU	Easton Stick 10-yard touchdown run, Cam Pedersen kick good	0	10
2	13:49	9	60	2:58	EWU	40-yard field goal by Roldan Alcobendas	3	10
2	8:00	10	75	5:49	NDSU	Easton Stick 4-yard touchdown run, Cam Pedersen kick good	3	17
2	0:27	9	59	2:42	EWU	Jayce Gilder 2-yard touchdown reception from Gunner Talkington, Roldan Alcobendas kick good	10	17
3	11:52	3	25	0:52	NDSU	Darrius Shepherd 23-yard touchdown reception from Easton Stick, Cam Pedersen kick good	10	24
3	11:40	1	75	0:12	EWU	Sam McPherson 75-yard touchdown run, Roldan Alcobendas kick good	17	24
3	10:44	2	84	0:56	NDSU	Darrius Shepherd 78-yard touchdown reception from Easton Stick, Cam Pedersen kick good	17	31
4	2:19	4	80	1:02	EWU	Eric Barriere 5-yard touchdown run, Roldan Alcobendas kick good	24	31
4	1:16	3	49	1:03	NDSU	Easton Stick 46-yard touchdown run, Cam Pedersen kick good	24	38
"TOP" = time of possession. For other American football terms, see Glossary of American football.							24	38

=== Game statistics ===
	1	2	3	4	Total
No. 3 Eagles	0	10	7	7	24
No. 1 Bison	10	7	14	7	38

Statistics	EWU	NDSU
First downs	15	23
Plays–yards	59–332	73–481
Rushes–yards	33–157	54–290
Passing yards	175	191
Passing: comp–att–int	14–26–2	13–19–2
Time of possession	19:55	40:05

Team	Category	Player	Statistics
Eastern Washington	Passing	Eric Barriere	13/25, 198 yds, 2 INT
Eastern Washington	Rushing	Sam McPherson	18 car, 158 yds, 1 TD
Eastern Washington	Receiving	Nsimba Webster	4 rec, 92 yds
North Dakota State	Passing	Easton Stick	13/19, 198 yds, 2 TD, 2 INT
North Dakota State	Rushing	Easton Stick	18 car, 121 yds, 3 TD
North Dakota State	Receiving	Darrius Shepherd	5 rec, 125 yds, 2 TD
