= Edward Snell =

Edward Snell may refer to:

- Edward Snell (cricketer) (1906–1973), English cricketer
- Edward Snell (engineer) (1820–1880), railway engineer and surveyor

== See also ==
- Snell (surname)
