= 2018 Illinois State Redbirds football team =

American college football season

2018 Illinois State Redbirds football
- Conference: Missouri Valley Football Conference
- Record: 6–5 (3–5 MVFC)
- Head coach: Brock Spack (10th season)
- Offensive coordinator: Kurt Beathard (3rd season)
- Defensive coordinator: Travis Niekamp (1st season)
- MVPs: Zackary Mathews; Spencer Schnell
- Captains: Luther Kirk; Spencer Schnell; Nick Kielbasa
- Home stadium: Hancock Stadium

2018 Missouri Valley Football Conference standings
	Conf.			Overall
Team	W		L	W		L
No. 1 North Dakota State $^	8	–	0	15	–	0
No. 3 South Dakota State ^	6	–	2	10	–	3
No. 23 Northern Iowa ^	5	–	3	7	–	6
Indiana State	5	–	3	7	–	4
Western Illinois	4	–	4	5	–	6
Illinois State	3	–	5	6	–	5
Youngstown State	3	–	5	4	–	7
South Dakota	3	–	5	4	–	7
Missouri State	2	–	6	4	–	7
Southern Illinois	1	–	7	2	–	9
$ – Conference champion; ^ – FCS playoff participant; Rankings from STATS Poll

The 2018 Illinois State Redbirds football team represented Illinois State University as a member of the Missouri Valley Football Conference (MVFC) during the 2018 NCAA Division I FCS football season. Led by tenth-year head coach Brock Spack, the Redbirds compiled an overall record of 6–5 with a mark of 3–5 in conference play, placing in a three-way tie for sixth in the MVFC. Illinois State played home games at Hancock Stadium in Normal, Illinois.

== Preseason ==
=== Preseason MVFC poll ===
The MVFC released their preseason poll on July 29, 2018, with the Redbirds predicted to finish in fifth place.

=== Preseason All-MVFC Teams ===
The Redbirds placed five players on the preseason all-MVFC teams.

Offense

1st team

James Robinson – RB

Spencer Schnell – WR

Drew Himmelman – OL

2nd team

Tylor Petkovich – TE

Defense

2nd team

Mitchell Brees – DB

== Schedule ==
Date	Time	Opponent	Rank	Site	TV	Result	Attendance
September 1	6:30 p.m.	Saint Xavier*	No. 21	Hancock Stadium; Normal, IL	NBCS CHIC+, ESPN+	W 46–0	9,157
September 8	6:30 p.m.	Eastern Illinois*	No. 19	Hancock Stadium; Normal, IL (Mid-America Classic)	NBCS CHIC+, ESPN+	W 48–10	8,914
September 22	2:00 p.m.	at Colorado State*	No. 16	Canvas Stadium; Fort Collins, CO	ATTSN	W 35–19	26,259
September 29	2:00 p.m.	at Missouri State	No. 9	Robert W. Plaster Stadium; Springfield, MO	ESPN+	L 21–24	12,224
October 6	2:00 p.m.	Western Illinois	No. 15	Hancock Stadium; Normal, IL	NBCS CHIC, ESPN+	W 33–16	8,516
October 13	2:00 p.m.	Southern Illinois^{†}	No. 12	Hancock Stadium; Normal, IL	ESPN3	W 51–3	11,247
October 20	2:30 p.m.	at No. 1 North Dakota State	No. 8	Fargodome; Fargo, ND	ESPN+	L 14–28	18,553
October 27	12:00 p.m.	No. 7 South Dakota State	No. 11	Hancock Stadium; Normal, IL	ESPN3	L 28–38	12,144
November 3	1:00 p.m.	at Northern Iowa	No. 14	UNI-Dome; Cedar Falls, IA	ESPN+	L 16–26	10,838
November 10	12:00 p.m.	at Indiana State	No. 23	Memorial Stadium; Terre Haute, IN	ESPN3	L 23–28	4,016
November 17	12:00 p.m.	Youngstown State		Hancock Stadium; Normal, IL	NBCS CHIC, ESPN+	W 35–28	6,072
*Non-conference game; ^{†}Homecoming; Rankings from STATS Poll released prior to the game; All times are in Central time

== Game summaries ==
=== Saint Xavier ===
	1	2	3	4	Total
Cougars	0	0	0	0	0
No. 21 Redbirds	14	10	14	8	46

=== Eastern Illinois ===
	1	2	3	4	Total
Panthers	0	0	10	0	10
No. 19 Redbirds	7	21	10	10	48

=== At Colorado State ===
	1	2	3	4	Total
No. 16 Redbirds	0	14	7	14	35
Rams	6	0	7	6	19

=== At Missouri State ===
	1	2	3	4	Total
No. 9 Redbirds	0	0	14	7	21
Bears	3	7	7	7	24

=== Western Illinois ===
	1	2	3	4	Total
Leathernecks	6	7	3	0	16
No. 15 Redbirds	2	10	0	21	33

=== Southern Illinois ===
	1	2	3	4	Total
Salukis	0	0	3	0	3
No. 12 Redbirds	7	24	7	13	51

=== At North Dakota State ===
	1	2	3	4	Total
No. 8 Redbirds	0	0	7	7	14
No. 1 Bison	7	14	7	0	28

=== South Dakota State ===
	1	2	3	4	Total
No. 7 Jackrabbits	7	21	7	3	38
No. 11 Redbirds	7	0	0	21	28

=== At Northern Iowa ===
	1	2	3	4	Total
No. 14 Redbirds	3	0	0	13	16
Panthers	3	16	7	0	26

=== At Indiana State ===
	1	2	3	4	Total
No. 23 Redbirds	10	0	7	6	23
Sycamores	0	21	0	7	28

=== Youngstown State ===
	1	2	3	4	Total
Penguins	3	10	8	7	28
Redbirds	7	7	7	14	35

== Ranking movements ==
Ranking movements Legend: ██ Increase in ranking ██ Decrease in ranking RV = Received votes т = Tied with team above or below
	Week													
Poll	Pre	1	2	3	4	5	6	7	8	9	10	11	12	Final
STATS FCS	21	19	19	16	9	15	12	8	11	14	23	RV	RV	
Coaches	20	19	18–T	15	10	14	12	9	9	13	22	RV	RV	
