= 2018 Southern Illinois Salukis football team =

American college football season

2018 Southern Illinois Salukis football
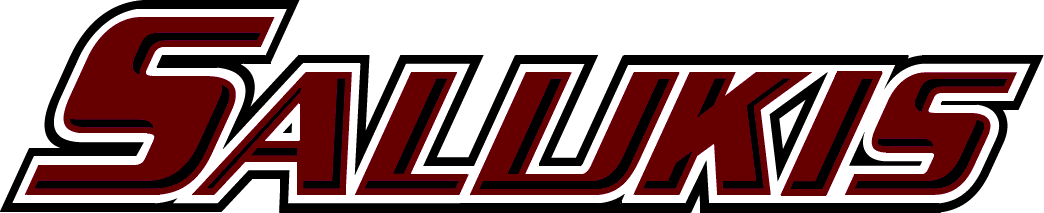
- Conference: Missouri Valley Football Conference
- Record: 2–9 (1–7 MVFC)
- Head coach: Nick Hill (3rd season)
- Offensive coordinator: John Van Dam (3rd season)
- Defensive coordinator: Kraig Paulson (3rd season)
- Home stadium: Saluki Stadium

2018 Missouri Valley Football Conference standings
	Conf.			Overall
Team	W		L	W		L
No. 1 North Dakota State $^	8	–	0	15	–	0
No. 3 South Dakota State ^	6	–	2	10	–	3
No. 23 Northern Iowa ^	5	–	3	7	–	6
Indiana State	5	–	3	7	–	4
Western Illinois	4	–	4	5	–	6
Illinois State	3	–	5	6	–	5
Youngstown State	3	–	5	4	–	7
South Dakota	3	–	5	4	–	7
Missouri State	2	–	6	4	–	7
Southern Illinois	1	–	7	2	–	9
$ – Conference champion; ^ – FCS playoff participant; Rankings from STATS Poll

The 2018 Southern Illinois Salukis football team represented Southern Illinois University Carbondale as a member of the Missouri Valley Football Conference (MVFC) during the 2018 NCAA Division I FCS football season. Led by third-year head coach Nick Hill, the Salukis compiled an overall record of 2–9 with a mark of 1–7 in conference play, placing last out of ten teams in the MVFC. Southern Illinois played home games at Saluki Stadium in Carbondale, Illinois.

== Preseason ==
=== Preseason MVFC poll ===
The MVFC released their preseason poll on July 29, 2018, with the Redbirds predicted to finish in eighth place.

=== Preseason All-MVFC Teams ===
The Salukis placed four players on the preseason all-MVFC teams.

Offense

1st team

Darrell James – WR

Defense

1st team

Jeremy Chinn – DB

Lane Reazin – P

2nd team

Anthony Knighton – DL

== Schedule ==
Date	Time	Opponent	Site	TV	Result	Attendance
August 30	6:00 p.m.	at Murray State*	Roy Stewart Stadium; Murray, KY	ESPN+	W 49–10	6,350
September 8	3:00 p.m.	at Ole Miss*	Vaught–Hemingway Stadium; Oxford, MS	SECN	L 41–76	53,339
September 15	6:00 p.m.	Southeast Missouri State*	Saluki Stadium; Carbondale, IL	ESPN+	L 44–48	8,592
September 29	6:00 p.m.	South Dakota	Saluki Stadium; Carbondale, IL	ESPN+	L 24–31	8,546
October 6	5:00 p.m.	at Youngstown State	Stambaugh Stadium; Youngstown, OH	ESPN+	L 14–17	14,581
October 13	2:00 p.m.	at No. 12 Illinois State	Hancock Stadium; Normal, IL	ESPN3	L 3–51	11,247
October 20	2:00 p.m.	Indiana State^{†}	Saluki Stadium; Carbondale, IL	ESPN+	L 21–24	6,435
October 27	2:00 p.m.	at Missouri State	Robert W. Plaster Stadium; Springfield, MO	ESPN+	W 49–35	6,374
November 3	1:00 p.m.	Western Illinois	Saluki Stadium; Carbondale, IL	ESPN3	L 31–34	4,780
November 10	1:00 p.m.	No. 6 South Dakota State	Saluki Stadium; Carbondale, IL	ESPN+	L 38–57	4,433
November 17	2:30 p.m.	at No. 1 North Dakota State	Fargodome; Fargo, ND	ESPN+	L 17–65	18,008
*Non-conference game; ^{†}Homecoming; Rankings from STATS Poll released prior to the game; All times are in Central time

== Game summaries ==
=== At Murray State ===
	1	2	3	4	Total
Salukis	7	21	14	7	49
Racers	3	7	0	0	10

=== At Ole Miss ===
	1	2	3	4	Total
Salukis	21	17	3	0	41
Rebels	14	21	14	27	76

=== Southeast Missouri State ===
	1	2	3	4	Total
Redhawks	14	3	17	14	48
Salukis	10	10	7	17	44

=== South Dakota ===
	1	2	3	4	Total
Coyotes	7	3	21	0	31
Salukis	14	3	0	7	24

=== At Youngstown State ===
	1	2	3	4	Total
Salukis	0	7	0	7	14
Penguins	3	3	0	11	17

=== At Illinois State ===
	1	2	3	4	Total
Salukis	0	0	3	0	3
No. 12 Redbirds	7	24	7	13	51

=== Indiana State ===
	1	2	3	4	Total
Sycamores	7	7	10	0	24
Salukis	7	0	0	14	21

=== At Missouri State ===
	1	2	3	4	Total
Salukis	0	21	21	7	49
Bears	7	14	0	14	35

=== Western Illinois ===
	1	2	3	4	Total
Leathernecks	7	7	0	20	34
Salukis	7	10	14	0	31

=== South Dakota State ===
	1	2	3	4	Total
No. 6 Jackrabbits	10	20	20	7	57
Salukis	3	14	21	0	38

=== At North Dakota State ===
	1	2	3	4	Total
Salukis	14	0	3	0	17
No. 1 Bison	28	7	16	14	65
