= 2018 Youngstown State Penguins football team =

American college football season

2018 Youngstown State Penguins football
- Conference: Missouri Valley Football Conference
- Record: 4–7 (3–5 MVFC)
- Head coach: Bo Pelini (4th season)
- Offensive coordinator: Brian Crist (1st season)
- Offensive scheme: Spread
- Co-defensive coordinators: Richard McNutt (1st season); Donald D'Alesio (1st season)
- Base defense: 4–3
- Home stadium: Stambaugh Stadium

2018 Missouri Valley Football Conference standings
	Conf.			Overall
Team	W		L	W		L
No. 1 North Dakota State $^	8	–	0	15	–	0
No. 3 South Dakota State ^	6	–	2	10	–	3
No. 23 Northern Iowa ^	5	–	3	7	–	6
Indiana State	5	–	3	7	–	4
Western Illinois	4	–	4	5	–	6
Illinois State	3	–	5	6	–	5
Youngstown State	3	–	5	4	–	7
South Dakota	3	–	5	4	–	7
Missouri State	2	–	6	4	–	7
Southern Illinois	1	–	7	2	–	9
$ – Conference champion; ^ – FCS playoff participant; Rankings from STATS Poll

The 2018 Youngstown State Penguins football team represented Youngstown State University in the 2018 NCAA Division I FCS football season. They were led by third-year head coach Bo Pelini and played their home games at Stambaugh Stadium. They were a member of the Missouri Valley Football Conference. They finished the season 4–7, 3–5 in MVFC play to finish in a three-way tie for sixth place.

== Preseason ==
=== Award watch lists ===
Award	Player	Position	Year
Walter Payton Award	Tevin McCaster	RB	SR

=== Preseason MVFC poll ===
The MVFC released their preseason poll on July 29, 2018, with the Penguins predicted to finish in fourth place.

=== Preseason All-MVFC Teams ===
The Penguins placed six players on the preseason all-MVFC teams.

Offense

1st team

Tevin McCaster – RB

Vitas Hrynkiewicz – OL

Gavin Wiggins – OL

Steven Wethli – LS

Defense

1st team

Armand Dellovade – LB

2nd team

Bryce Gibson – DB

== Schedule ==
Date	Time	Opponent	Rank	Site	TV	Result	Attendance
September 1	2:00 p.m.	Butler*	No. 25	Stambaugh Stadium; Youngstown, OH	ESPN+	L 21–23	11,219
September 8	6:00 p.m.	at No. 14 (FBS) West Virginia*		Mountaineer Field; Morgantown, WV	AT&TSN Pitt	L 17–52	58,446
September 15	2:00 p.m.	Valparaiso*		Stambaugh Stadium; Youngstown, OH	ESPN+	W 42–7	14,913
September 29	4:00 p.m.	at Western Illinois		Hanson Field; Macomb, IL	ESPN3	L 38–45	4,352
October 6	6:00 p.m.	Southern Illinois^{†}		Stambaugh Stadium; Youngstown, OH	ESPN+	W 17–14	14,581
October 13	3:00 p.m.	at No. 2 South Dakota State		Dana J. Dykhouse Stadium; Brookings, SD	ESPN+	L 7–36	14,357
October 20	6:00 p.m.	South Dakota		Stambaugh Stadium; Youngstown, OH	ESPN+	W 29–17	11,112
October 27	2:00 p.m.	Indiana State		Stambaugh Stadium; Youngstown, OH	ESPN+	L 17–43	9,090
November 3	3:30 p.m.	at No. 1 North Dakota State		Fargodome; Fargo, ND	ESPN+	L 7–17	18,028
November 10	12:00 p.m.	No. 22 Northern Iowa		Stambaugh Stadium; Youngstown, OH	ESPN+	W 31–10	8,407
November 17	1:00 p.m.	at Illinois State		Hancock Stadium; Normal, IL	ESPN+	L 28–35	5,583
*Non-conference game; ^{†}Homecoming; Rankings from STATS Poll released prior to the game; All times are in Eastern time

== Game summaries ==
=== Butler ===
	1	2	3	4	Total
Bulldogs	7	0	0	16	23
No. 25 Penguins	7	0	14	0	21

=== At West Virginia ===
	1	2	3	4	Total
Penguins	0	7	10	0	17
No. 14 (FBS) Mountaineers	7	14	21	10	52

=== Valparaiso ===
	1	2	3	4	Total
Crusaders	7	0	0	0	7
Penguins	7	14	14	7	42

=== At Western Illinois ===
	1	2	3	4	Total
Penguins	7	0	10	21	38
Leathernecks	6	10	14	15	45

=== Southern Illinois ===
	1	2	3	4	Total
Salukis	0	7	0	7	14
Penguins	3	3	0	11	17

=== At South Dakota State ===
	1	2	3	4	Total
Penguins	7	0	0	0	7
No. 2 Jackrabbits	9	7	7	13	36

=== South Dakota ===
	1	2	3	4	Total
Coyotes	0	0	10	7	17
Penguins	19	3	0	7	29

=== Indiana State ===
	1	2	3	4	Total
Sycamores	3	13	7	20	43
Penguins	7	3	7	0	17

=== At North Dakota State ===
	1	2	3	4	Total
Penguins	0	0	7	0	7
No. 1 Bison	0	7	0	10	17

=== Northern Iowa ===
	1	2	3	4	Total
No. 22 Panthers	0	7	3	0	10
Penguins	7	7	14	3	31

=== At Illinois State ===
	1	2	3	4	Total
Penguins	3	10	8	7	28
Redbirds	7	7	7	14	35

== Ranking movements ==
Ranking movements Legend: ██ Increase in ranking ██ Decrease in ranking — = Not ranked RV = Received votes
	Week													
Poll	Pre	1	2	3	4	5	6	7	8	9	10	11	12	Final
STATS FCS	25	RV	—	—	—	—	—	—	—	—	—	—	—	
Coaches	24	RV	—	RV	—	—	—	—	—	—	—	—	—	
