= Schnall =

Schnall is a surname. Notable people with the surname include:

- Avi Schnall (fl. 2022), American politician
- Ida Schnall (1889–1973), American baseball player and actress
- Kevin Schnall (born 1977), American college baseball coach
- Marianne Schnall (fl. 1995), American writer, interviewer, and feminist
- Rick Schnall (born 1969/1970), American businessman
- Susan Schnall (born 1943), American U.S. Navy nurse court-martialed for anti-Vietnam War activity

== See also ==
- Schnell, another surname
