= 2018 North Dakota State Bison football team =

American college football season

2018 North Dakota State Bison football

NCAA Division I champion MVFC champion

NCAA Division I Championship Game, W 38–24 vs. Eastern Washington
- Conference: Missouri Valley Football Conference

Ranking
- STATS: No. 1
- FCS Coaches: No. 1
- Record: 15–0 (8–0 MVFC)
- Head coach: Chris Klieman (5th season)
- Offensive coordinator: Courtney Messingham (2nd season)
- Offensive scheme: Pro-style
- Defensive coordinator: Matt Entz (5th season)
- Base defense: 3–4
- Home stadium: Fargodome

2018 Missouri Valley Football Conference standings
	Conf.			Overall
Team	W		L	W		L
No. 1 North Dakota State $^	8	–	0	15	–	0
No. 3 South Dakota State ^	6	–	2	10	–	3
No. 23 Northern Iowa ^	5	–	3	7	–	6
Indiana State	5	–	3	7	–	4
Western Illinois	4	–	4	5	–	6
Illinois State	3	–	5	6	–	5
Youngstown State	3	–	5	4	–	7
South Dakota	3	–	5	4	–	7
Missouri State	2	–	6	4	–	7
Southern Illinois	1	–	7	2	–	9
$ – Conference champion; ^ – FCS playoff participant; Rankings from STATS Poll

The 2018 North Dakota State Bison football team represented North Dakota State University in the 2018 NCAA Division I FCS football season. They were led by fifth-year head coach Chris Klieman, who also coached his final season with the Bison before heading off to take over for the retiring Bill Snyder at Kansas State. The team played their 26th season in the Fargodome in Fargo, North Dakota as members of the Missouri Valley Football Conference. They entered the season as defending National Champions and had won six of the last seven FCS titles. In 2018, the Bison finished the regular season 11–0, the first undefeated Bison season since the 2013 campaign, and won their eighth consecutive MVFC title. They received an automatic qualifying bid to the FCS playoff tournament and were seeded as the No. 1 team. The Bison then went 4–0 in the FCS playoffs to finish 15–0 and FCS champions.

== Preseason ==
=== Award watch lists ===
Award	Player	Position	Year
Walter Payton Award	Bruce Anderson	RB	SR
Walter Payton Award	Easton Stick	QB	SR
Buck Buchanan Award	Greg Menard	DE	SR

=== Preseason MVFC poll ===
The MVFC released their preseason poll on July 29, 2018, with the Bison predicted unanimously to win the MVFC championship.

=== Preseason All-MVFC Teams ===
The Bison placed eleven players on the preseason all-MVFC teams.

Offense

1st team

Bruce Anderson – RB

Brock Robbins – FB

Zack Johnson – OL

Tanner Volson – OL

2nd team

Easton Stick – QB

Darrius Shepherd – WR

Defense

1st team

Greg Menard – DL

Aaron Steidl – DL

Jabril Cox – LB

Robbie Grimsley – DB

2nd team

Derrek Tuszka – DL

== Schedule ==
Date	Time	Opponent	Rank	Site	TV	Result	Attendance
September 1	2:30 p.m.	Cal Poly*	No. 1	Fargodome; Fargo, ND	NBC ND/ESPN+	W 49–3	18,483
September 15	2:30 p.m.	North Alabama*	No. 1	Fargodome; Fargo, ND	NBC ND/ESPN+	W 38–7	18,557
September 22	1:00 p.m.	Delaware*^{†}	No. 1	Fargodome; Fargo, ND	NBC ND/ESPN+	W 38–10	18,883
September 29	2:30 p.m.	No. 3 South Dakota State	No. 1	Fargodome; Fargo, ND (Dakota Marker)	NBC ND/ESPN+	W 21–17	18,846
October 6	1:00 p.m.	at No. 22 Northern Iowa	No. 1	UNI-Dome; Cedar Falls, IA	NBC ND/ESPN+	W 56–31	9,899
October 13	6:00 p.m.	at Western Illinois	No. 1	Hanson Field; Macomb, IL	NBC ND/ESPN+	W 34–7	2,709
October 20	2:30 p.m.	No. 8 Illinois State	No. 1	Fargodome; Fargo, ND	NBC ND/ESPN+	W 28–14	18,553
October 27	2:00 p.m.	at South Dakota	No. 1	DakotaDome; Vermillion, SD	NBC ND/ESPN+	W 59–14	9,589
November 3	2:30 p.m.	Youngstown State	No. 1	Fargodome; Fargo, ND (Harvest Bowl)	NBC ND/ESPN+	W 17–7	18,028
November 10	2:00 p.m.	at Missouri State	No. 1	Robert W. Plaster Stadium; Springfield, MO	ESPN+	W 48–7	5,224
November 17	2:30 p.m.	Southern Illinois	No. 1	Fargodome; Fargo, ND	NBC ND/ESPN+	W 65–17	18,008
December 1	2:00 p.m.	No. 23 Montana State*	No. 1	Fargodome; Fargo, ND (FCS Playoffs Second Round)	NBC ND/ESPN3	W 52–10	17,005
December 8	11:00 a.m.	No. 8 Colgate*	No. 1	Fargodome; Fargo, ND (FCS Playoffs Quarterfinals)	NBC ND/ESPN	W 35–0	16,404
December 14	7:00 p.m.	No. 5 South Dakota State*	No. 1	Fargodome; Fargo, ND (FCS Playoffs Semifinals)	ESPN2	W 44–21	18,286
January 5	11:00 a.m.	No. 3 Eastern Washington*	No. 1	Toyota Stadium; Frisco, TX (FCS National Championship)	ESPN2	W 38–24	17,802
*Non-conference game; ^{†}Homecoming; Rankings from STATS Poll released prior to the game; All times are in Central time

- Source: Schedule

== Game summaries ==
Polls are based on the FCS STATS Poll

=== Cal Poly ===
	1	2	3	4	Total
Mustangs	3	0	0	0	3
No. 1 Bison	7	21	14	7	49

=== North Alabama ===
	1	2	3	4	Total
Lions	0	0	0	7	7
No. 1 Bison	7	10	7	14	38

=== Delaware ===
	1	2	3	4	Total
Fightin' Blue Hens	0	0	0	10	10
No. 1 Bison	28	7	3	0	38

=== South Dakota State ===
	1	2	3	4	Total
No. 3 Jackrabbits	7	0	10	0	17
No. 1 Bison	0	14	0	7	21

=== At Northern Iowa ===
	1	2	3	4	Total
No. 1 Bison	7	14	7	28	56
No. 22 Panthers	14	10	7	0	31

=== At Western Illinois ===
	1	2	3	4	Total
No.1 Bison	3	14	7	10	34
Leathernecks	0	7	0	0	7

=== Illinois State ===
	1	2	3	4	Total
No. 8 Redbirds	0	0	7	7	14
No. 1 Bison	7	14	7	0	28

=== At South Dakota ===
	1	2	3	4	Total
No. 1 Bison	21	14	7	17	59
Coyotes	0	7	7	0	14

=== Youngstown State ===
	1	2	3	4	Total
Penguins	0	0	7	0	7
No. 1 Bison	0	7	0	10	17

=== At Missouri State ===
	1	2	3	4	Total
No. 1 Bison	20	14	14	0	48
Bears	0	0	7	0	7

=== Southern Illinois ===
	1	2	3	4	Total
Salukis	14	0	3	0	17
No. 1 Bison	28	16	7	14	65

== FCS Playoffs ==
=== Montana State–Second Round ===
	1	2	3	4	Total
No. 23 Bobcats	3	0	7	0	10
No. 1 Bison	21	17	7	7	52

=== Colgate–Quarterfinals ===
	1	2	3	4	Total
No. 9 Raiders	0	0	0	0	0
No. 1 Bison	7	7	14	7	35

=== South Dakota State–Semifinals ===
	1	2	3	4	Total
No. 5 Jackrabbits	7	0	14	0	21
No. 1 Bison	7	7	21	9	44

=== Eastern Washington–Championship ===
	1	2	3	4	Total
No. 4 Eagles	0	10	7	7	24
No. 1 Bison	10	7	14	7	38

== Ranking movements ==
Ranking movements Legend: ( ) = First-place votes
	Week													
Poll	Pre	1	2	3	4	5	6	7	8	9	10	11	12	Final
STATS FCS	1 (151)	1 (157)	1 (154)	1 (152)	1 (152)	1 (155)	1 (160)	1 (160)	1 (163)	1 (160)	1 (158)	1 (155)	1 (155)	1 (156)
Coaches	1 (23)	1 (26)	1 (25)	1 (26)	1 (26)	1 (26)	1 (26)	1 (26)	1 (26)	1 (26)	1 (26)	1 (26)	1 (26)	1 (26)

== Players drafted into the NFL ==
Round	Pick	Player	Position	NFL Club
5	166	Easton Stick	QB	Los Angeles Chargers
