= 2018 South Dakota State Jackrabbits football team =

American college football season

2018 South Dakota State Jackrabbits football

NCAA Division I Semifinal, L 21–44 at North Dakota State
- Conference: Missouri Valley Football Conference

Ranking
- STATS: No. 3
- FCS Coaches: No. 3
- Record: 10–3 (6–2 MVFC)
- Head coach: John Stiegelmeier (22nd season)
- Offensive coordinator: Eric Eidsness (13th season)
- Defensive coordinator: Clint Brown (10th season)
- Home stadium: Dana J. Dykhouse Stadium

2018 Missouri Valley Football Conference standings
	Conf.			Overall
Team	W		L	W		L
No. 1 North Dakota State $^	8	–	0	15	–	0
No. 3 South Dakota State ^	6	–	2	10	–	3
No. 23 Northern Iowa ^	5	–	3	7	–	6
Indiana State	5	–	3	7	–	4
Western Illinois	4	–	4	5	–	6
Illinois State	3	–	5	6	–	5
Youngstown State	3	–	5	4	–	7
South Dakota	3	–	5	4	–	7
Missouri State	2	–	6	4	–	7
Southern Illinois	1	–	7	2	–	9
$ – Conference champion; ^ – FCS playoff participant; Rankings from STATS Poll

The 2018 South Dakota State Jackrabbits football team represented South Dakota State University as a member of the Missouri Valley Football Conference (MVFC) during the 2018 NCAA Division I FCS football season. Led by 22nd-year head coach John Stiegelmeier, the Jackrabbits compiled an overall record of 10–3 with a mark of 6–2 in conference play, placing second in the MVFC. South Dakota State received an at-large bid to the NCAA Division I Football Championship playoffs, where, after a first round bye, the Jackrabbits defeated Duquesne in the second round and Kennesaw State in the quarterfinals before falling to fellow MVFC member and eventual national champion, North Dakota State, in the semifinals. The team played home games on campus at Dana J. Dykhouse Stadium in Brookings, South Dakota.

== Preseason ==
=== Award watch lists ===
Award	Player	Position	Year
Walter Payton Award	Taryn Christion	QB	SR
Buck Buchanan Award	Christian Rozeboom	LB	JR

=== Preseason MVFC poll ===
The MVFC released their preseason poll on July 29, 2018, with the Jackrabbits predicted to finish in second place.

=== Preseason All-MVFC Teams ===
The Jackrabbits placed seven players at eight positions on the preseason all-MVFC teams.

Offense

1st team

Taryn Christion – QB

Chase Vinatieri – K

2nd team

Luke Sellers – FB

Cade Johnson – WR

Bradey Sorenson – LS

Defense

1st team

Christian Rozeboom – LB

Jordan Brown – DB

2nd team

Cade Johnson – WR

== Schedule ==
Date	Time	Opponent	Rank	Site	TV	Result	Attendance
September 1	7:00 p.m.	at Iowa State*	No. 3	Jack Trice Stadium; Ames, IA		Cancelled (Note: Game was cancelled due to inclement weather.)	
September 8	6:00 p.m.	Montana State*	No. 3	Dana J. Dykhouse Stadium; Brookings, SD	Midco	W 45–14	14,614
September 15	6:00 p.m.	Arkansas–Pine Bluff*	No. 3	Dana J. Dykhouse Stadium; Brookings, SD	Midco	W 90–6	14,526
September 29	2:30 p.m.	at No. 1 North Dakota State	No. 3	Fargodome; Fargo, ND (Dakota Marker)	ESPN+, Midco	L 17–21	18,846
October 6	6:00 p.m.	Indiana State	No. 3	Dana J. Dykhouse Stadium; Brookings, SD	Midco	W 54–51 ^{OT}	10,318
October 13	2:00 p.m.	Youngstown State^{†}	No. 2	Dana J. Dykhouse Stadium; Brookings, SD	Midco	W 36–7	14,357
October 20	4:00 p.m.	at No. 25 Northern Iowa	No. 2	UNI-Dome; Cedar Falls, IA	ESPN3	L 9–24	12,013
October 27	12:00 p.m.	at No. 11 Illinois State	No. 7	Hancock Stadium; Normal, IL	ESPN3	W 38–28	12,144
November 3	2:00 p.m.	Missouri State	No. 7	Dana J. Dykhouse Stadium; Brookings, SD	Midco	W 59–7	5,869
November 10	1:00 p.m.	at Southern Illinois	No. 6	Saluki Stadium; Carbondale, IL	ESPN+	W 57–38	4,433
November 17	2:00 p.m.	South Dakota	No. 5	Dana J. Dykhouse Stadium; Brookings, SD (rivalry)	Midco	W 49–27	8,517
December 1	2:00 p.m.	Duquesne*	No. 5	Dana J. Dykhouse Stadium; Brookings, SD (NCAA Division I Second Round)	ESPN3	W 51–6	3,042
December 8	1:00 p.m.	at No. 2 Kennesaw State*	No. 5	Fifth Third Bank Stadium; Kennesaw, GA (NCAA Division I Quarterfinal)	ESPN3	W 27–17	3,262
December 14	7:00 p.m.	at No. 1 North Dakota State*	No. 5	Fargodome; Fargo, ND (NCAA Division I Semifinal)	ESPN2	L 21–44	18,286
*Non-conference game; ^{†}Homecoming; Rankings from STATS Poll released prior to the game; All times are in Central time

== Roster ==
2018 South Dakota State Jackrabbits football team roster
Players
Coaches
Offense

Pos.	#	Name	Class
WR	1	Jacob Brown	Jr
QB	2	J'Bore Gibbs	Fr
QB	3	Taryn Christion	Sr
RB	5	Blair Mulholland	So
RB	8	C. J. Wilson	Fr
OL	60	Mason McCormick	Fr
OL	64	Garret Greenfield	Fr

Defense

Pos.	#	Name	Class
LB	2	Christian Rozeboom	Jr
S	3	Joshua Manchigiah	So
S	6	Makiah Slade	Sr
LB	7	Seven Wilson	So
S	33	Michael Griffin II	Jr

Special teams

Pos.	#	Name	Class
PK	4	Chase Vinatieri	Jr

Head coach

- John Stiegelmeier

Coordinators/assistant coaches

Legend

- (C) Team captain
- (S) Suspended
- (I) Ineligible
- Injured
- Redshirt

Roster

== Game summaries ==
=== Montana State ===
	1	2	3	4	Total
Bobcats	0	0	8	6	14
No. 3 Jackrabbits	7	17	14	7	45

=== Arkansas–Pine Bluff ===
	1	2	3	4	Total
Golden Lions	6	0	0	0	6
No. 3 Jackrabbits	28	21	21	20	90

=== At North Dakota State ===
	1	2	3	4	Total
No. 3 Jackrabbits	7	0	10	0	17
No. 1 Bison	0	14	0	7	21

=== Indiana State ===
	1	2	3	4	OT	Total
Sycamores	10	7	7	24	3	51
No. 3 Jackrabbits	7	14	21	6	6	54

=== Youngstown State ===
	1	2	3	4	Total
Penguins	7	0	0	0	7
No. 2 Jackrabbits	9	7	7	13	36

=== At Northern Iowa ===
	1	2	3	4	Total
No. 2 Jackrabbits	3	0	0	6	9
No. 25 Panthers	0	7	7	10	24

=== At Illinois State ===
	1	2	3	4	Total
No. 7 Jackrabbits	7	21	7	3	38
No. 11 Redbirds	7	0	0	21	28

=== Missouri State ===
	1	2	3	4	Total
Bears	0	7	0	0	7
No. 7 Jackrabbits	7	31	7	14	59

=== At Southern Illinois ===
	1	2	3	4	Total
No. 6 Jackrabbits	10	20	20	7	57
Salukis	3	14	21	0	38

=== South Dakota ===
	1	2	3	4	Total
Coyotes	7	0	7	13	27
No. 5 Jackrabbits	28	7	7	7	49

== FCS Playoffs ==
=== Duquesne–Second Round ===
	1	2	3	4	Total
Dukes	0	0	6	0	6
No. 5 Jackrabbits	7	17	20	7	51

=== At Kennesaw State–Quarterfinals ===
	1	2	3	4	Total
No. 5 Jackrabbits	3	14	3	7	27
No. 2 Owls	3	0	0	14	17

=== At North Dakota State–Semifinals ===
	1	2	3	4	Total
No. 5 Jackrabbits	7	0	14	0	21
No. 1 Bison	7	7	21	9	44

== Ranking movements ==
Ranking movements Legend: ██ Increase in ranking ██ Decrease in ranking т = Tied with team above or below
	Week													
Poll	Pre	1	2	3	4	5	6	7	8	9	10	11	12	Final
STATS FCS	3	3	3	3	3	3	2	2	7	7	6	5	5	3
Coaches	3	3	3	3	3	4–T	5	2	8	7	6	5	5	3

== Players drafted into the NFL ==
Round	Pick	Player	Position	NFL Club
7	223	Jordan Brown	CB	Cincinnati Bengals
