= SNEL =

SNEL may refer to:

- Sasken Network Engineering Limited, a wholly owned subsidiary of Sasken Communication Technologies
- Société nationale d'électricité, the national electricity company of the Democratic Republic of the Congo

== See also ==
- Snel, a Dutch surname
