= John Snell (disambiguation) =

John Snell (died 1679) was founder of the Snell Exhibitions at the University of Oxford.

John Snell may also refer to:

- John Snell (MP for Stafford), Member of Parliament (MP) for Stafford 1390
- John Snell (15th-century MP), MP for Winchester in 1402
- John Snell (MP for Devizes) (died 1587), English politician
- John Snell (died 1717) (1638–1717), MP for Exeter
- John Snell (1682–1726), MP for Gloucester
- John Abner Snell (1880–1936), American missionary surgeon and hospital administrator in China
- John Snell (bowls) (born 1934), Australian international bowls player
- John Snell (priest), Canon of Windsor, and Archdeacon of London
- John Snell (electrical engineer) (1869–1938), English electrical engineer
- John Snell (railway engineer) (1932–2014), former managing director of the Romney, Hythe and Dymchurch Railway

== See also ==
- John Blashford-Snell (born 1936), former British Army officer, explorer and author
