= 2018 Northern Iowa Panthers football team =

American college football season

2018 Northern Iowa Panthers football

NCAA Division I Second Round, L 16–23 at UC Davis
- Conference: Missouri Valley Football Conference

Ranking
- STATS: No. 23
- Record: 7–6 (5–3 MVFC)
- Head coach: Mark Farley (18th season)
- Offensive coordinator: John Bond (1st season)
- Defensive coordinator: Jeremiah Johnson (6th season)
- Home stadium: UNI-Dome

2018 Missouri Valley Football Conference standings
	Conf.			Overall
Team	W		L	W		L
No. 1 North Dakota State $^	8	–	0	15	–	0
No. 3 South Dakota State ^	6	–	2	10	–	3
No. 23 Northern Iowa ^	5	–	3	7	–	6
Indiana State	5	–	3	7	–	4
Western Illinois	4	–	4	5	–	6
Illinois State	3	–	5	6	–	5
Youngstown State	3	–	5	4	–	7
South Dakota	3	–	5	4	–	7
Missouri State	2	–	6	4	–	7
Southern Illinois	1	–	7	2	–	9
$ – Conference champion; ^ – FCS playoff participant; Rankings from STATS Poll

The 2018 Northern Iowa Panthers football team represented the University of Northern Iowa as a member of the Missouri Valley Football Conference (MVFC) during the 2018 NCAA Division I FCS football season. Led by 18th-year head coach Mark Farley, the Panthers compiled an overall record of 7–6 with a mark of 5–3 in conference play, tying for third place in the MVFC. Northern Iowa received an at-large bid to NCAA Division I Football Championship playoffs, where the Panthers defeated Lamar in the first round before losing to UC Davis in the second round. The team played home games at the UNI-Dome in Cedar Falls, Iowa.

== Schedule ==
Date	Time	Opponent	Rank	Site	TV	Result	Attendance
September 1	8:00 p.m.	at No. 24 Montana*	No. 13	Washington–Grizzly Stadium; Missoula, MT	PSN (Note: Panther Sports Network involves these channels (CFU Ch. 15/HD415; KCRG-TV Ch. 9.2; WHO-DT Ch. 13.2; KGCW Ch. 26, (NBC Sports Chicago or NBC Sports Chicago Plus))	L 23–26	25,018
September 15	6:30 p.m.	at Iowa*	No. 21	Kinnick Stadium; Iowa City, IA	BTN	L 14–38	69,250
September 22	4:00 p.m.	Hampton*	No. 25	UNI-Dome; Cedar Falls, IA	PSN, ESPN3	W 44–0	9,116
September 27	6:00 p.m.	at Indiana State	No. 23	Memorial Stadium; Terre Haute, IN	ESPN3	W 33–0	5,487
October 6	1:00 p.m.	No. 1 North Dakota State	No. 22	UNI-Dome; Cedar Falls, IA	PSN, ESPN+	L 31–56	9,899
October 13	6:00 p.m.	at No. 24 South Dakota		DakotaDome; Vermillion, SD	ESPN+	W 42–28	9,513
October 20	4:00 p.m.	No. 2 South Dakota State^{†}	No. 25	UNI-Dome; Cedar Falls, IA	ESPN3	W 24–9	12,013
October 27	1:00 p.m.	at Western Illinois	No. 17	Hanson Field; Macomb, IL	ESPN+	L 17–37	2,832
November 3	1:00 p.m.	No. 14 Illinois State		UNI-Dome; Cedar Falls, IA	PSN, ESPN+	W 26–16	10,838
November 10	11:00 a.m.	at Youngstown State	No. 22	Stambaugh Stadium; Youngstown, OH	ESPN+	L 10–31	8,407
November 17	4:00 p.m.	Missouri State		UNI-Dome; Cedar Falls, IA	PSN, ESPN+	W 37–0	10,072
November 24	4:00 p.m.	Lamar*		UNI-Dome; Cedar Falls, IA (NCAA Division I First Round)	ESPN3	W 16–13	4,082
December 1	9:00 p.m.	at No. 7 UC Davis*		Aggie Stadium; Davis, CA (NCAA Division Second Round)	ESPN3	L 16–23	8,306
*Non-conference game; ^{†}Homecoming; Rankings from STATS Poll released prior to the game; All times are in Central time

== Rankings ==
Ranking movements Legend: ██ Increase in ranking ██ Decrease in ranking RV = Received votes т = Tied with team above or below
	Week													
Poll	Pre	1	2	3	4	5	6	7	8	9	10	11	12	Final
STATS FCS	13	21	21	25	23	22	RV	25	17	RV	22	RV	RV	23
Coaches	12	18	18–T	22	21	22	RV	RV	23	RV	24	RV	RV	RV

== Preseason ==
=== Preseason MVFC poll ===
The MVFC released their preseason poll on July 29, 2018, with the Panthers predicted to finish in third place.

=== Preseason All-MVFC Teams ===
The Panthers placed six players on the preseason all-MVFC teams.

Offense

1st team

Briley Moore – TE

2nd team

Marcus Weymiller – RB

Isaiah Weston – WR

Cal Twait – OL

Defense

1st team

Rickey Neal Jr. – LB

2nd team

Xavior Williams – DB

== Game summaries ==
=== At Montana ===
	1	2	3	4	Total
No. 13 Panthers	0	0	7	16	23
No. 24 Grizzlies	16	10	0	0	26

=== At Iowa ===
	1	2	3	4	Total
No. 21 Panthers	0	0	0	14	14
Hawkeyes	7	14	17	0	38

=== Hampton ===
	1	2	3	4	Total
Pirates	0	0	0	0	0
No. 25 Panthers	10	10	21	3	44

=== At Indiana State ===
	1	2	3	4	Total
No. 23 Panthers	3	6	14	10	33
Sycamores	0	0	0	0	0

=== North Dakota State ===
	1	2	3	4	Total
No. 1 Bison	7	14	7	28	56
No. 22 Panthers	14	10	7	0	31

=== At South Dakota ===
	1	2	3	4	Total
Panthers	0	21	7	14	42
No. 24 Coyotes	3	10	8	7	28

=== South Dakota State ===
	1	2	3	4	Total
No. 2 Jackrabbits	3	0	0	6	9
No. 25 Panthers	0	7	7	10	24

=== At Western Illinois ===
	1	2	3	4	Total
No. 17 Panthers	3	7	0	7	17
Leathernecks	0	16	7	14	37

=== Illinois State ===
	1	2	3	4	Total
No. 14 Redbirds	3	0	0	13	16
Panthers	3	16	7	0	26

=== At Youngstown State ===
	1	2	3	4	Total
No. 22 Panthers	0	7	3	0	10
Penguins	7	7	14	3	31

=== Missouri State ===
	1	2	3	4	Total
Bears	0	0	0	0	0
Panthers	10	10	7	10	37

=== Lamar—NCAA Division I First Round ===
	1	2	3	4	Total
Cardinals	13	0	0	0	13
Panthers	3	10	0	3	16

=== At UC Davis—NCAA Division I Second Round ===
	1	2	3	4	Total
Panthers	6	0	7	3	16
No. 7 Aggies	10	6	7	0	23

== Personnel ==
=== Roster ===
2018 Northern Iowa Panthers Football
Quarterback: 11 Colton Howell – Senior (6'0", 213); 13 Will McElvain – Freshman (5'10", 195); 14 Eli Dunne – Senior (6'5", 238); 15 Jacob Keller – (redshirt) Freshman (6'1", 206); 16 Luke Gillett – Freshman (6'1", 190); 17 Christian Ellsworth – (redshirt) Sophomore (6'2", 210); 18 John Sullivan – (redshirt) Freshman (6'1", 204); Running back: 5 Martavin Hall – Freshman (5'11", 220); 8 Marcus Weymiller – Senior (5'10", 204); 13 Jon Nzombo – Senior (5'7", 205); 20 Sam Schnee – Freshman (5'8", 182); 21 Christian Jegen – Junior (5'11", 205); 25 Trevor Allen – Junior (5'10", 203); 30 Alphonso Soko – (redshirt) Freshman (5'7", 179); 32 Tyler Hoosman – (redshirt) Freshman (6'0", 201); 32? Jack Wegher – (redshirt) Sophomore (5'10", 205); 36 Trevon Alexander – Freshman (6'1", 195); Wide receiver: 2 Sam Ingoli – Freshman (6'5", 205); 3 Suni Lane – Sophomore (6'3", 203); 4 Deion McShane – Freshman (5'9", 155); 10 Eric Mooney – Freshman (6'1", 190); 12 Nick Phillips – (redshirt) Sophomore (5'7", 188); 28 Leslie Owusu – Senior (6'2", 200); 37 Aaron Graham – Junior (5'11", 201); 80 Isaiah Weston – (redshirt) Sophomore (6'4", 207); 82 Nick Fossey – (redshirt) Sophomore (6'1", 199); 83 Jaylin James – Junior (6'3", 202); 87 Jalen Rima – Junior (6'0", 192); Placekicker: 43 Austin Errthum – Senior (5'10", 180); 62 Sam Drysdale – Junior (6'4", 180); 63 Nate Murphy – (redshirt) Freshman (6'0", 166); Tight end: 81 Tristan Bohr – Junior (6'4", 246); 84 Jayden Scott – Freshman (6'5", 230); 85 Elias Nissen – Senior (6'4", 243); 86 Briley Moore – Junior (6'3", 242); 89 Alex Allen – Freshman (6'6", 220); 89? Trey Recknor – (redshirt) Sophomore (6'0", 230); Taylor Otterstatter – (redshirt) Sophomore (6'5", 251)	Offensive Lineman: 52 William Blaser – Sophomore (6'1", 281); 55 Colton Lueck – Junior (6'4", 286); 57 Kurt Countryman – Freshman (6'1", 285); 59 Max Erpelding – (redshirt) Sophomore (6'0", 260); 61 Chase Arends – Freshman (6'1", 270); 65 John Yount – (redshirt) Freshman (6'2", 295); 66 Philip Arendt – (redshirt) Sophomore (6'1", 303); 67 Erik Sorensen – (redshirt) Freshman (6'6", 320); 68 Brink Jolly – Graduate Student (6'5", 330); 69 Tyus Phillips – (redshirt) Freshman (6'7", 285); 70 Trevor Penning – (redshirt) Freshman (6'6", 289); 71 Nick Ellis – (redshirt) Sophomore (6'4", 308); 72 Justin Peine – (redshirt) Freshman (6'5", 293); 73 Mason Beisen – (redshirt) Freshman (6'4", 329); 74 Jackson Scott-Brown – Junior (6'4", 312); 75 Cal Twait – Senior (6'5", 305); 76 Spencer Brown – (redshirt) Sophomore (6'8", 290); 77 Matthew Vanderslice – Sophomore (6'7", 257); 78 Tyler Putney – Senior (6'6", 302); 79 Ezrah Szczyrbak – Senior (6'4", 299); Defensive Lineman: 44 Jared Brinkman – Sophomore (5'11", 290); 46 Devin Rice – Freshman (6'5", 220); 47 Elerson G. Smith – (redshirt) Sophomore (6'6", 245); 49 Desmond Chapple – (redshirt) Sophomore 6'3", 235); 64 Hezekiah Applegate – Junior (6'2", 285); 90 Khristian Boyd – Freshman (6'4", 305); 91 Brawntae Wells – (redshirt) Sophomore (6'2", 261); 92 Sean Wendel – Freshman (6'5", 240); 94 Tim Butcher – Sophomore (6'2", 300); 94 Sonny Onken – (redshirt) Sophomore (6'3", 256); 95 Seth Thomas – Junior (6'5", 262); 96 Caden Houghtelling – Freshman (6'5", 240); 97 Marcel Minniefield – Junior (6'2", 282); 98 Bryce Douglas – Senior (6'0", 304); Long snappers: 66 Nick Simpson – (redshirt) Freshman (5'8", 203); 93 Joe Friedrich – Junior (6'0", 206)	Linebacker: 7 Rickey Neal Jr. – Senior (6'1", 241); 22 Bryce Flater – (redshirt) Freshman (6'1", 224); 31 Jevon Brekke – Freshman (6'3", 185); 33 Jake Hartford – (redshirt) Sophomore (6'3", 226); 34 Sam Thompson – Freshman (6'2", 205); 39 Duncan Ferch – Senior (6'1", 234); 40 Alfonzo Lambert – (redshirt) Sophomore (6'0", 209); 41 Blake Thomas – Senior (6'1", 224); 42 Kendrick Suntken – Senior (6'0", 240); 43 Cristian Perez – Senior (6'1", 246); 45 Brock Hadachek – (redshirt) Freshman (6'2", 208); 48 Chris Kolarevic – (redshirt) Freshman (6'0", 223); 50 Jordan Gayer – Freshman (6'3", 195); 51 Riley Van Wyhe – (redshirt) Freshman (6'2", 215); 53 Weston Schultz – Sophomore (6'3", 215); 56 Ricky Grimes – Junior (6'1", 228); 59 Zac Ebeling – (redshirt) Freshman (6'1", 230); Jesse Cardenas – (redshirt) Sophomore (6'2", 225); Defensive back: 1 Roosevelt Lawrence – Junior (6'0", 170); 3 Suni Lane – Sophomore (6'3", 203); 5 Korby Sander – (redshirt) Sophomore (6'0", 212); 9 Xavior Williams – (redshirt) Sophomore (5'11", 175); 19 Shakespeare Williams – Freshman (5'11", 187); 23 A.J. Allen – Senior (6'0", 215); 24 Nikholi Jaghai – Junior (5'7", 181); 26 Isaiah Nimmers – (redshirt) Sophomore (5'9", 185); 27 Austin Evans – (redshirt) Sophomore (6'0", 189); 29 Tayler Johnson – Freshman (6'2", 155); 35 Max Steffen – Sophomore (5'11", 185); 38 Zac Kibby – (redshirt) Sophomore (5'11, 203); Punter: 88 Michael Kuntz – Senior (5'11", 188)
