= 2018 Indiana State Sycamores football team =

American college football season

2018 Indiana State Sycamores football
- Conference: Missouri Valley Football Conference

Ranking
- FCS Coaches: No. 25
- Record: 7–4 (5–3 MVFC)
- Head coach: Curt Mallory (2nd season)
- Offensive coordinator: Jeff Hecklinski (2nd season)
- Defensive coordinator: Brad Wilson (2nd season)
- Home stadium: Memorial Stadium

2018 Missouri Valley Football Conference standings
	Conf.			Overall
Team	W		L	W		L
No. 1 North Dakota State $^	8	–	0	15	–	0
No. 3 South Dakota State ^	6	–	2	10	–	3
No. 23 Northern Iowa ^	5	–	3	7	–	6
Indiana State	5	–	3	7	–	4
Western Illinois	4	–	4	5	–	6
Illinois State	3	–	5	6	–	5
Youngstown State	3	–	5	4	–	7
South Dakota	3	–	5	4	–	7
Missouri State	2	–	6	4	–	7
Southern Illinois	1	–	7	2	–	9
$ – Conference champion; ^ – FCS playoff participant; Rankings from STATS Poll

The 2018 Indiana State Sycamores football team represented Indiana State University as a member of the Missouri Valley Football Conference (MVFC) during the 2018 NCAA Division I FCS football season. Led by second-year head coach Curt Mallory, the Sycamores compiled an overall record of 7–4 with a mark of 5–3 in conference play, tying for third place in the MVFC. Despite being ranked in the top 25 at the end of the regular season, Indiana State did not receive an at-large bid to the NCAA Division I Football Championship playoffs. The team played home games at Memorial Stadium in Terre Haute, Indiana.

== Schedule ==
Date	Time	Opponent	Site	TV	Result	Attendance
August 30	7:00 p.m.	Quincy*	Memorial Stadium; Terre Haute, IN	ESPN3	W 49–0	6,243
September 8	7:00 p.m.	at Louisville*	Cardinal Stadium; Louisville, KY	ACCN Extra	L 7–31	44,520
September 15	7:00 p.m.	at Eastern Illinois*	O'Brien Field; Charleston, IL	ESPN+	W 55–41	6,420
September 27	7:00 p.m.	No. 23 Northern Iowa	Memorial Stadium; Terre Haute, IN	ESPN3	L 0–33	5,487
October 6	7:00 p.m.	at No. 3 South Dakota State	Dana J. Dykhouse Stadium; Brookings, SD	ESPN+	L 51–54 ^{OT}	10,318
October 13	2:00 p.m.	Missouri State^{†}	Memorial Stadium; Terre Haute, IN	ESPN+	L 26–29	6,721
October 20	3:00 p.m.	at Southern Illinois	Saluki Stadium; Carbondale, IL	ESPN+	W 24–21	6,435
October 27	2:00 p.m.	at Youngstown State	Stambaugh Stadium; Youngstown, OH	ESPN+	W 43–17	10,870
November 3	1:00 p.m.	South Dakota	Memorial Stadium; Terre Haute, IN	ESPN+	W 51–48 ^{3OT}	5,816
November 10	1:00 p.m.	No. 23 Illinois State	Memorial Stadium; Terre Haute, IN	ESPN3	W 28–23	4,016
November 17	2:00 p.m.	at Western Illinois	Hanson Field; Macomb, IL	ESPN3	W 15–13	1,813
*Non-conference game; ^{†}Homecoming; Rankings from STATS Poll released prior to the game; All times are in Eastern time

== Rankings ==
Ranking movements Legend: ██ Increase in ranking ██ Decrease in ranking — = Not ranked RV = Received votes
	Week													
Poll	Pre	1	2	3	4	5	6	7	8	9	10	11	12	Final
STATS FCS	—	—	—	—	—	—	—	—	—	—	—	RV	25	RV
Coaches	—	—	—	—	—	—	—	—	—	—	RV	24	22	25

== Preseason ==
=== Preseason MVFC poll ===
The MVFC released their preseason poll on July 29, 2018, with the Sycamores predicted to finish in last place.

=== Preseason All-MVFC Teams ===
The Sycamores placed six players on the preseason all-MVFC teams.

Offense

2nd team

Jerry Nunez – K

Defense

2nd team

Inoke Moala – DL

Derrek Tuszka – DL

Jonas Griffith – LB

Katrell Moss – LB

Rondell Green – DB

== Game summaries ==
=== Quincy ===
	1	2	3	4	Total
Hawks	0	0	0	0	0
Sycamores	14	7	14	14	49

=== At Louisville ===
	1	2	3	4	Total
Sycamores	7	0	0	0	7
Cardinals	7	0	7	17	31

=== At Eastern Illinois ===
	1	2	3	4	Total
Sycamores	17	14	14	10	55
Panthers	20	0	7	14	41

=== Northern Iowa ===
	1	2	3	4	Total
No. 23 Panthers	3	6	14	10	33
Sycamores	0	0	0	0	0

=== At South Dakota State ===
	1	2	3	4	Total
Sycamores	10	7	7	24	48
No. 3 Jackrabbits	7	14	21	6	48

=== Missouri State ===
	1	2	3	4	Total
Bears	7	14	0	8	29
Sycamores	0	10	7	9	26

=== At Southern Illinois ===
	1	2	3	4	Total
Sycamores	7	7	10	0	24
Salukis	7	0	0	14	21

=== At Youngstown State ===
	1	2	3	4	Total
Sycamores	3	13	7	20	43
Penguins	7	3	7	0	17

=== South Dakota ===
	1	2	3	4	OT	2OT	3OT	Total
Coyotes	7	7	7	10	7	7	3	48
Sycamores	14	7	0	10	7	7	6	51

=== Illinois State ===
	1	2	3	4	Total
No. 23 Redbirds	10	0	7	6	23
Sycamores	0	21	0	7	28

=== At Western Illinois ===
	1	2	3	4	Total
Sycamores	3	6	3	3	15
Leathernecks	3	0	10	0	13
