= 2018 Western Illinois Leathernecks football team =

American college football season

2018 Western Illinois Leathernecks football
- Conference: Missouri Valley Football Conference
- Record: 5–6 (4–4 MVFC)
- Head coach: Jared Elliott (1st season)
- Co-offensive coordinators: Ty Howle (1st season); David Rocco (1st season)
- Defensive coordinator: Tyler Stockton (1st season)
- Home stadium: Hanson Field

2018 Missouri Valley Football Conference standings
	Conf.			Overall
Team	W		L	W		L
No. 1 North Dakota State $^	8	–	0	15	–	0
No. 3 South Dakota State ^	6	–	2	10	–	3
No. 23 Northern Iowa ^	5	–	3	7	–	6
Indiana State	5	–	3	7	–	4
Western Illinois	4	–	4	5	–	6
Illinois State	3	–	5	6	–	5
Youngstown State	3	–	5	4	–	7
South Dakota	3	–	5	4	–	7
Missouri State	2	–	6	4	–	7
Southern Illinois	1	–	7	2	–	9
$ – Conference champion; ^ – FCS playoff participant; Rankings from STATS Poll

The 2018 Western Illinois Leathernecks football team represented Western Illinois University as member of the Missouri Valley Football Conference (MVFC) during the 2018 NCAA Division I FCS football season. Led by first-year head coach Jared Elliott, the Leathernecks compiled an overall record of 5–6 with a mark of 4–4 in conference play, placing fifth in the MVFC. Western Illinois played home games at Hanson Field in Macomb, Illinois.

== Schedule ==
Date	Time	Opponent	Site	TV	Result	Attendance
August 30	8:00 p.m.	at Montana State*	Bobcat Stadium; Bozeman, MT	SWX	L 23–26	18,507
September 8	6:30 p.m.	at Illinois*	Memorial Stadium; Champaign, IL	BTN	L 14–34	39,252
September 15	3:00 p.m.	No. 15 Montana*	Hanson Field; Macomb, IL	ESPN+	W 31–27	4,011
September 29	3:00 p.m.	Youngstown State*^{†}	Hanson Field; Macomb, IL	ESPN3	W 45–38	4,352
October 6	2:00 p.m.	at No. 15 Illinois State	Hancock Stadium; Normal, IL	ESPN+	L 16–33	8,516
October 13	6:00 p.m.	No. 1 North Dakota State	Hanson Field; Macomb, IL	ESPN+	L 7–34	2,709
October 20	2:00 p.m.	at Missouri State	Robert W. Plaster Stadium; Springfield, MO	ESPN+	W 31–14	12,109
October 27	1:00 p.m.	No. 17 Northern Iowa*	Hanson Field; Macomb, IL	ESPN+	W 37–17	2,832
November 3	1:00 p.m.	at Southern Illinois	Saluki Stadium; Carbondale, IL	ESPN3	W 34–31	4,780
November 10	1:00 p.m.	at South Dakota	DakotaDome; Vermillion, SD	ESPN+	L 12–17	8,761
November 17	1:00 p.m.	Indiana State*	Hanson Field; Macomb, IL	ESPN3	L 13–15	5,822
*Non-conference game; ^{†}Homecoming; Rankings from STATS Poll released prior to the game; All times are in Central time

== Preseason ==
=== Preseason MVFC poll ===
The MVFC released their preseason poll on July 29, 2018, with the Leathernecks predicted to finish in seventh place.

=== Preseason All-MVFC Teams ===
The Leathernecks placed five at six positions players on the preseason all-MVFC teams.

Offense

2nd team

Sean McGuire – QB

Steve McShane – RB

Defense

1st team

Khalen Saunders – DL

Justin Fitzpatrick – DB

Steve McShane – RS

2nd team

Quentin Moon – DB

=== Award watch lists ===
Award	Player	Position	Year
Buck Buchanan Award	Khalen Saunders	DE	SR

== Game summaries ==
=== At Montana State ===
	1	2	3	4	Total
Leathernecks	7	6	7	3	23
Bobcats	3	3	14	6	26

=== At Illinois ===
	1	2	3	4	Total
Leathernecks	7	0	7	0	14
Fighting Illini	0	14	10	10	34

=== Montana ===
	1	2	3	4	Total
No. 15 Grizzlies	18	0	3	6	27
Leathernecks	14	3	0	14	31

=== Youngstown State ===
	1	2	3	4	Total
Penguins	7	0	10	21	38
Leathernecks	6	10	14	15	45

=== At Illinois State ===
	1	2	3	4	Total
Leathernecks	6	7	3	0	16
No. 15 Redbirds	2	10	0	21	33

=== North Dakota State ===
	1	2	3	4	Total
No. 1 Bison	3	14	7	10	34
Leathernecks	0	7	0	0	7

=== At Missouri State ===
	1	2	3	4	Total
Leathernecks	7	3	7	14	31
Bears	7	0	0	7	14

=== Northern Iowa ===
	1	2	3	4	Total
No. 17 Panthers	3	7	0	7	17
Leathernecks	0	16	7	14	37

=== At Southern Illinois ===
	1	2	3	4	Total
Leathernecks	7	7	0	20	34
Salukis	7	10	14	0	31

=== At South Dakota ===
	1	2	3	4	Total
Leathernecks	3	0	0	9	12
Coyotes	7	0	3	7	17

=== Indiana State ===
	1	2	3	4	Total
Sycamores	3	6	3	3	15
Leathernecks	3	0	10	0	13

== Players drafted into the NFL ==
Round	Pick	Player	Position	NFL club
3	84	Khalen Saunders	DT	Kansas City Chiefs
