= Schnell =

Schnell is a surname of German origin meaning fast or quickly and may refer to:

== Organizations ==
- Schnell Group, an Italian company

== People ==
- Claude Schnell (contemporary), heavy metal keyboardist
- Edward Schnell (fl. mid-19th century), German arms dealer in Japan; brother of Henry Schnell
- Emil Schnell (born 1953), German politician
- F. Wolfgang Schnell (1913–2006), German professor of applied genetics and plant breeding
- Georg H. Schnell (1878–1951), German film actor
- Henry Schnell (fl. mid-19th century), German arms dealer in Japan; brother of Edward Schnell
- Hermann Josef Schnell (1916–1999), German polymer chemist
- Karl-Heinz Schnell (1915–2013), German ace fighter pilot in the Luftwaffe during World War II
- Matt Schnell (born 1990), American mixed martial artist
- Ray Schnell (1893–1970), American politician from North Dakota; state legislator and lieutenant governor
- Robert Schnell (born 1987), German politician
- Ron Schnell (born 1966), American computer programmer
- Santiago Schnell (contemporary), biophysical chemistry and computational biologist
- Siegfried Schnell (1916–1944), German ace fighter pilot in the Luftwaffe during World War II
- Spencer Schnell (born 1994), American football player

== See also ==
- Snellius (disambiguation)
