= Fill the Dome =

Food donation event in North Dakota, US

Fill The Dome is an event in Fargo, North Dakota and Moorhead, Minnesota, in which people donate non-perishable food and money to the Fargodome.

== Background ==
Fill the Dome started in 2007, and since then, more than 50 schools in the Fargo Moorhead area have participated. All the food and money combined is 2.6 million pounds, and more than 840,000 dollars.

In 2024, people donated more than 99,600 meals, and Moorhead High School had the highest number of donations.
