= 2018 South Dakota Coyotes football team =

American college football season

2018 South Dakota Coyotes football
- Conference: Missouri Valley Football Conference
- Record: 4–7 (3–5 MVFC)
- Head coach: Bob Nielson (3rd season)
- Offensive coordinator: Ted Schlafke (3rd season)
- Offensive scheme: Pro-style
- Co-defensive coordinators: Brian Mohnsen (1st season); Atiba Bradley (1st season)
- Base defense: 4–3
- Home stadium: DakotaDome

2018 Missouri Valley Football Conference standings
	Conf.			Overall
Team	W		L	W		L
No. 1 North Dakota State $^	8	–	0	15	–	0
No. 3 South Dakota State ^	6	–	2	10	–	3
No. 23 Northern Iowa ^	5	–	3	7	–	6
Indiana State	5	–	3	7	–	4
Western Illinois	4	–	4	5	–	6
Illinois State	3	–	5	6	–	5
Youngstown State	3	–	5	4	–	7
South Dakota	3	–	5	4	–	7
Missouri State	2	–	6	4	–	7
Southern Illinois	1	–	7	2	–	9
$ – Conference champion; ^ – FCS playoff participant; Rankings from STATS Poll

The 2018 South Dakota Coyotes football team represented the University of South Dakota in the 2018 NCAA Division I FCS football season. They were led by third-year head coach Bob Nielson and played their home games in the DakotaDome. They were a member of the Missouri Valley Football Conference. They finished the season 4–7, 3–5 in MVFC play to finish in a three-way tie for sixth place.

== Preseason ==
=== Award watch lists ===
Award	Player	Position	Year
Buck Buchanan Award	Darin Greenfield	DE	JR

=== Preseason MVFC poll ===
The MVFC released their preseason poll on July 29, 2018, with the Coyotes predicted to finish in sixth place.

=== Preseason All-MVFC Teams ===
The Coyotes placed seven players on the preseason all-MVFC teams.

Offense

1st team

Shamar Jackson – WR

2nd team

Tyler Ciurej – OL

Nick Jensen – OL

Mason Scheidegger — OL

Defense

1st team

Darin Greenfield – DL

Andrew Gray – DB

2nd team

Brady Schutt – P

== Schedule ==
Date	Time	Opponent	Rank	Site	TV	Result	Attendance
September 1	6:00 p.m.	at Kansas State*		Bill Snyder Family Football Stadium; Manhattan, KS	ESPN3	L 24–27	50,063
September 8	2:00 p.m.	Northern Colorado*	No. 23	DakotaDome; Vermillion, SD	ESPN+ Midco	W 43–28	9,143
September 15	7:00 p.m.	at No. 11 Weber State*	No. 22	Stewart Stadium; Ogden, UT	KELOland; Pluto TV	L 10–27	8,455
September 29	6:00 p.m.	at Southern Illinois		Saluki Stadium; Carbondale, IL	ESPN+	W 31–24	8,546
October 6	2:00 p.m.	No. 24 Missouri State^{†}		DakotaDome; Vermillion, SD	ESPN3	W 35–28	10,092
October 13	6:00 p.m.	Northern Iowa	No. 24	DakotaDome; Vermillion, SD	ESPN+ Midco	L 28–42	9,513
October 20	5:00 p.m.	at Youngstown State		Stambaugh Stadium; Youngstown, OH	ESPN+	L 17–29	11,112
October 27	2:00 p.m.	No. 1 North Dakota State		DakotaDome; Vermillion, SD	ESPN+ Midco	L 14–59	9,589
November 3	12:00 p.m.	at Indiana State		Memorial Stadium; Terre Haute, IN	ESPN+	L 48–51 ^{3OT}	5,816
November 10	1:00 p.m.	Western Illinois		DakotaDome; Vermillion, SD	ESPN+ Midco	W 17–12	8,761
November 17	2:00 p.m.	at No. 5 South Dakota State		Dana J. Dykhouse Stadium; Brookings, SD (rivalry)	ESPN+ Midco	L 27–49	8,517
*Non-conference game; ^{†}Homecoming; Rankings from STATS Poll released prior to the game; All times are in Central time

== Game summaries ==
=== At Kansas State ===
	1	2	3	4	Total
Coyotes	10	14	0	0	24
Wildcats	3	9	0	15	27

Kansas State's Isaiah Zuber was credited for saving the game with two key plays: an 85-yard punt return with South Dakota leading 24–12. Later in the game caught a touchdown pass from Skylar Thompson with 7:21 left to give K-State its first lead of the second half.

Kansas State scored all but seven of its points on field goals and special teams. Sophomore kicker Blake Lynch scored Kansas State’s first 12 points on field goals of 22, 24, 38 and 44 yards. Kansas State racked up 13 penalties for 129 yards, but maintained more control of the ball with 37:39 of offense compared to South Dakota's 22:21. going over 100 years for the first time since 2016 against Florida Atlantic.

South Dakota quarterback Austin Simmons threw for 257 yards and one touchdown, continually finding receiver Levi Falck (11 catches, 140 yards) open against top K-State cornerback Duke Shelley. The Coyotes led 24–12 at halftime. ESPN reported "... one solid takeaway is how well the Coyotes were in control for much of the game. They did a great job limiting the Kansas State offense for three quarters and had many Kansas State fans, players and coaches frustrated throughout the night."

=== Northern Colorado ===
	1	2	3	4	Total
Bears	14	0	0	14	28
No. 23 Coyotes	14	20	0	9	43

=== At Weber State ===
	1	2	3	4	Total
No. 22 Coyotes	0	3	0	7	10
No. 11 Wildcats	11	7	3	6	27

=== At Southern Illinois ===
	1	2	3	4	Total
Coyotes	7	3	21	0	31
Salukis	14	3	0	7	24

=== Missouri State ===
	1	2	3	4	Total
No. 24 Bears	7	14	7	0	28
Coyotes	14	3	10	8	35

=== Northern Iowa ===
	1	2	3	4	Total
Panthers	0	21	7	14	42
No. 24 Coyotes	3	10	8	7	28

=== At Youngstown State ===
	1	2	3	4	Total
Coyotes	0	0	10	7	17
Penguins	19	3	0	7	29

=== North Dakota State ===
	1	2	3	4	Total
No. 1 Bison	21	14	7	17	59
Coyotes	0	7	7	0	14

=== At Indiana State ===
	1	2	3	4	OT	2OT	3OT	Total
Coyotes	7	7	7	10	7	7	3	48
Sycamores	14	7	0	10	7	7	6	51

=== Western Illinois ===
	1	2	3	4	Total
Leathernecks	3	0	0	9	12
Coyotes	7	0	3	7	17

=== At South Dakota State ===
	1	2	3	4	Total
Coyotes	7	0	7	13	27
No. 5 Jackrabbits	28	7	7	7	49

== Ranking movements ==
Ranking movements Legend: ██ Increase in ranking ██ Decrease in ranking — = Not ranked RV = Received votes
	Week													
Poll	Pre	1	2	3	4	5	6	7	8	9	10	11	12	Final
STATS FCS	RV	23	22	RV	RV	RV	24	RV	—	—	—	—	—	
Coaches	RV	RV	24	RV	RV	RV	RV	RV	—	—	—	—	—	
