= Richard Snell =

Richard Snell may refer to:

- Richard Snell (businessman), former Federal-Mogul CEO
- Richard Snell (cricketer) (born 1968), South African cricketer
- Richard Snell (criminal) (1930–1995), convicted murderer executed in 1995
- Richard Snell (make-up artist) (1955–2006), American makeup artist
