= 2018 Missouri State Bears football team =

American college football season

2018 Missouri State Bears football
- Conference: Missouri Valley Football Conference
- Record: 4–7 (2–6 MVFC)
- Head coach: Dave Steckel (4th season)
- Co-offensive coordinators: Sean Coughlin (3rd season); Mack Brown (3rd season)
- Offensive scheme: Multiple
- Defensive coordinator: Marcus Yokeley (4th season)
- Base defense: 4–3
- Captains: Jared Beshore; McNeese Egbim; Peyton Huslig; Jordan Turner
- Home stadium: Robert W. Plaster Stadium

2018 Missouri Valley Football Conference standings
	Conf.			Overall
Team	W		L	W		L
No. 1 North Dakota State $^	8	–	0	15	–	0
No. 3 South Dakota State ^	6	–	2	10	–	3
No. 23 Northern Iowa ^	5	–	3	7	–	6
Indiana State	5	–	3	7	–	4
Western Illinois	4	–	4	5	–	6
Illinois State	3	–	5	6	–	5
Youngstown State	3	–	5	4	–	7
South Dakota	3	–	5	4	–	7
Missouri State	2	–	6	4	–	7
Southern Illinois	1	–	7	2	–	9
$ – Conference champion; ^ – FCS playoff participant; Rankings from STATS Poll

The 2018 Missouri State Bears football team represented Missouri State University as a member of the Missouri Valley Football Conference (MVFC) during the 2018 NCAA Division I FCS football season. Led by fourth-year head coach Dave Steckel, the Bears compiled an overall record of 4–7 with a mark of 2–6 in conference play, placing ninth in the MVFC. Missouri State played home games at Robert W. Plaster Stadium in Springfield, Missouri.

== Schedule ==
Date	Time	Opponent	Rank	Site	TV	Result	Attendance
August 30	7:00 p.m.	at Oklahoma State*		Boone Pickens Stadium; Stillwater, OK	FS1	L 17–58	50,103
September 6	10:00 a.m.	Lincoln (MO)*		Robert W. Plaster Stadium; Springfield, MO	ESPN3	W 52–24	1,284
September 15	2:00 p.m.	No. 20 Northern Arizona*		Robert W. Plaster Stadium; Springfield, MO	ESPN3	W 40–8	7,217
September 29	2:00 p.m.	No. 9 Illinois State		Robert W. Plaster Stadium; Springfield, MO	ESPN+	W 24–21	12,224
October 6	2:00 p.m.	at South Dakota	No. 24	DakotaDome; Vermillion, SD	ESPN3	L 28–35	10,092
October 13	1:00 p.m.	at Indiana State		Memorial Stadium; Terre Haute, IN	ESPN+	W 29–26	6,721
October 20	2:00 p.m.	Western Illinois^{†}		Robert W. Plaster Stadium; Springfield, MO	ESPN+	L 14–31	12,109
October 27	2:00 p.m.	Southern Illinois		Robert W. Plaster Stadium; Springfield, MO	ESPN+	L 35–49	6,374
November 3	2:00 p.m.	at No. 7 South Dakota State		Dana J. Dykhouse Stadium; Brookings, SD	ESPN+	L 7–59	5,869
November 10	2:00 p.m.	No. 1 North Dakota State		Robert W. Plaster Stadium; Springfield, MO	ESPN+	L 7–48	5,224
November 17	4:00 p.m.	at Northern Iowa		UNI-Dome; Cedar Falls, IA	ESPN+	L 0–37	10,072
*Non-conference game; ^{†}Homecoming; Rankings from STATS Poll released prior to the game; All times are in Central time

== Rankings ==
Ranking movements Legend: ██ Increase in ranking ██ Decrease in ranking — = Not ranked RV = Received votes
	Week													
Poll	Pre	1	2	3	4	5	6	7	8	9	10	11	12	Final
STATS FCS	—	—	—	RV	RV	24	RV	RV	RV	—	—	—	—	
Coaches	—	—	—	—	—	RV	RV	RV	—	—	—	—	—	

== Preseason ==
=== Preseason MVFC poll ===
The MVFC released its preseason poll on July 29, 2018, with the Bears predicted to finish in ninth place.

=== Preseason All-MVFC Teams ===
The Bears placed three players on the preseason all-MVFC teams.

Offense

2nd team

Marquis Prophete – OL

Defense

1st team

Angelo Garbut – LB

2nd team

Darius Joseph – DB

== Game summaries ==
=== At Oklahoma State ===
	1	2	3	4	Total
Bears	0	7	10	0	17
Cowboys	17	14	14	13	58

=== Lincoln (MO) ===
	1	2	3	4	Total
Blue Tigers	10	0	7	7	24
Bears	7	28	10	7	52

=== Northern Arizona ===
	1	2	3	4	Total
No. 20 Lumberjacks	0	6	0	2	8
Bears	10	13	10	7	40

=== Illinois State ===
	1	2	3	4	Total
No. 9 Redbirds	0	0	14	7	21
Bears	3	7	7	7	24

=== At South Dakota ===
	1	2	3	4	Total
No. 24 Bears	7	14	7	0	28
Coyotes	14	3	10	8	35

=== At Indiana State ===
	1	2	3	4	Total
Bears	7	14	0	8	29
Sycamores	0	10	7	9	26

=== Western Illinois ===
	1	2	3	4	Total
Leathernecks	7	3	7	14	31
Bears	7	0	0	7	14

=== Southern Illinois ===
	1	2	3	4	Total
Salukis	0	21	21	7	49
Bears	7	14	0	14	35

=== At South Dakota State ===
	1	2	3	4	Total
Bears	0	7	0	0	7
No. 7 Jackrabbits	7	31	7	14	59

=== North Dakota State ===
	1	2	3	4	Total
No. 1 Bison	20	14	14	0	48
Bears	0	0	7	0	7

=== At Northern Iowa ===
	1	2	3	4	Total
Bears	0	0	0	0	0
Panthers	10	10	7	10	37
