= David Snell =

David Snell may refer to:

- David Snell (composer) (1897–1967), American composer of scores for 170 films
- David Snell (musician) (born 1936), British harpist, composer and conductor
- David Snell (screenwriter), Australian screenwriter, see AACTA Award for Best Adapted Screenplay
- David Rees Snell (born 1966), television actor
- Dave Snell, radio play-by-play announcer
- David Snell (golfer) (1933–2021), English golfer
