= Gate City Bank =

American mutual bank company

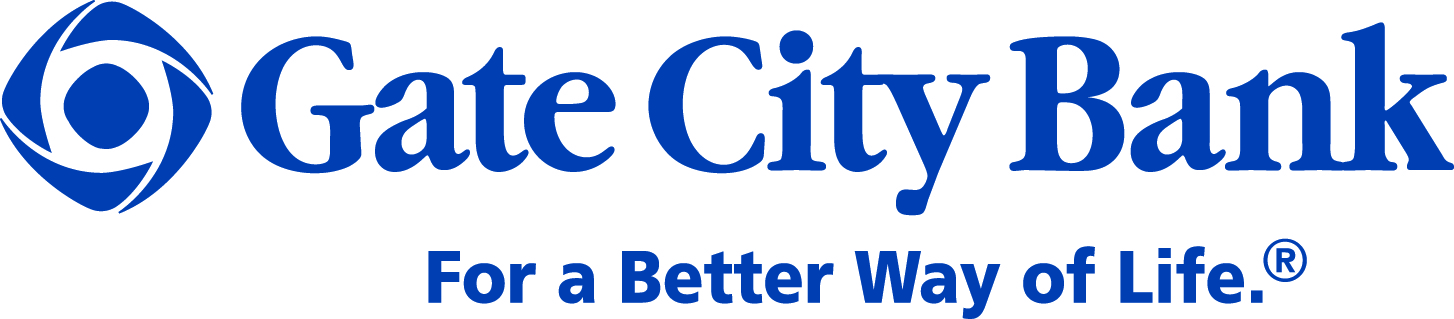

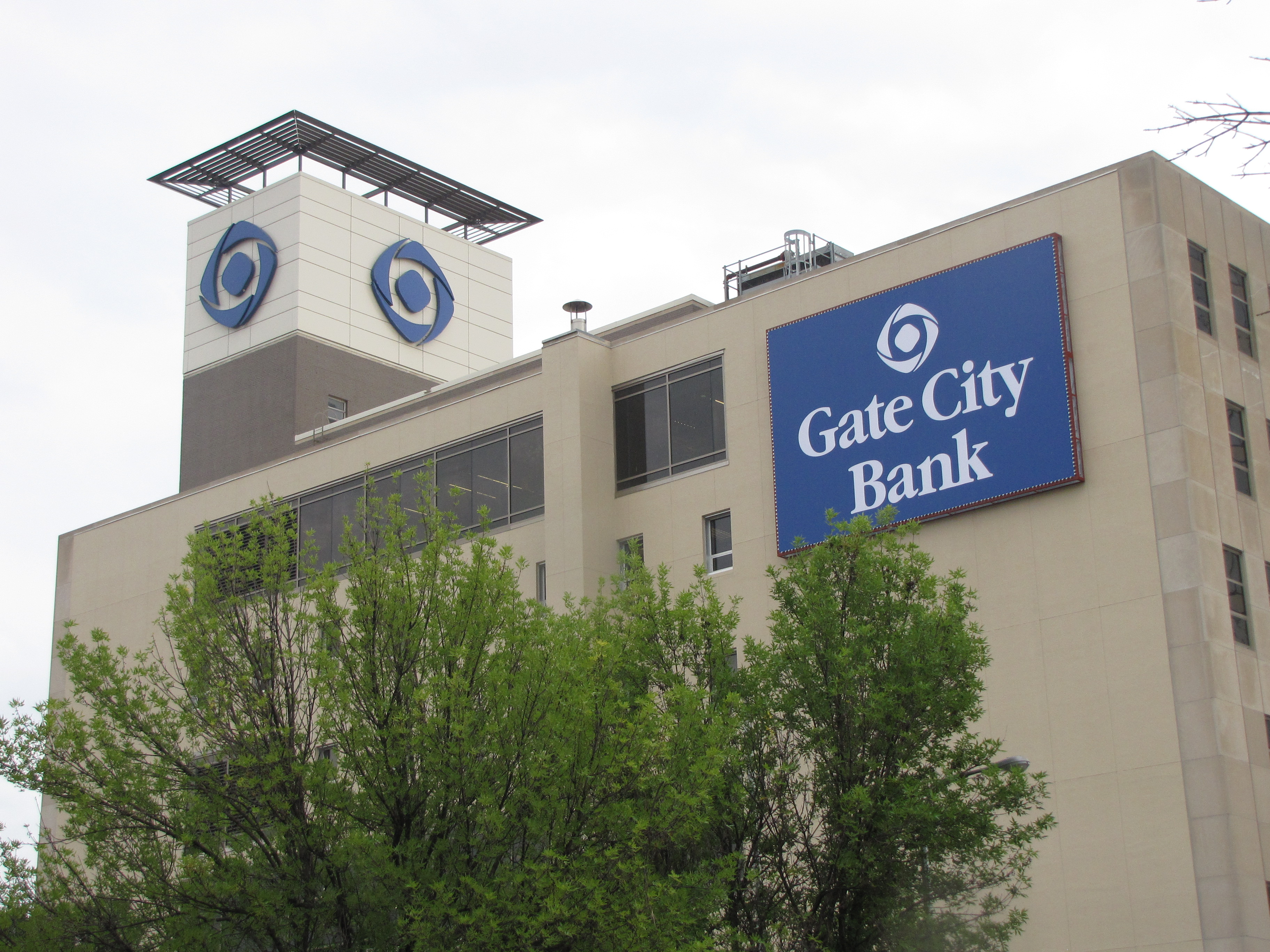
- Corporate headquarters in downtown Fargo, North Dakota
- Type: Thrift
- Industry: Retail banking, Financial services
- Predecessor: Gate City Building & Loan Association
- Founded: 1923; 103 years ago
- Headquarters: Fargo, North Dakota, United States
- Area served: North Dakota; Minnesota
- Key people: Steven J. Swiontek (Board Chair); Kevin J. Hanson (President & CEO)
- Total assets: US$3.98 billion (2026)
- Number of employees: 770
- Website: www.gatecity.bank

Gate City Bank is a mutual bank headquartered in Fargo, North Dakota, with 45 branches across 23 communities in North Dakota and central Minnesota.

== History and leadership ==
Gate City Bank was founded on July 2, 1923, by William Gillespie and seven others as Gate City Building & Loan Association. The name was inspired by the "Gateway to the West" nickname the railroad gave Fargo in 1872. As a mutual bank, Gate City Bank is owned by its customers, sometimes called members.

In 2000, the bank appointed Steven Swiontek President and Chief Executive Officer (CEO). He started with the bank in 1978 and under his leadership, the bank grew from 16 locations to 43 and from 148 employees to over 700.

In 2019, Gate City Bank named Kevin Hanson the new president and CEO. Hanson was chief operating officer (COO) and has spent his entire career with Gate City Bank.

The bank is governed by a six-member Board of Directors elected by the membership.
