= Snellman (surname) =

Snellman is a Swedish-language surname, more common in Finland than in Sweden.

== Geographical distribution ==
As of 2014, 76.1% of all known bearers of the surname Snellman were residents of Finland (frequency 1:2,905), 9.8% of the United States (1:1,480,538), 9.4% of Sweden (1:42,261), 1.1% of Australia (1:849,067) and 1.0% of Germany (1:3,085,716).

In Finland, the frequency of the surname was higher than national average (1:2,905) in the following regions:

1. Ostrobothnia (1:252)
2. Åland (1:1,468)
3. Central Ostrobothnia (1:2,229)

In Sweden, the frequency of the surname was higher than national average (1:42,261) in the following counties:

1. Gävleborg County (1:12,175)
2. Västmanland County (1:12,351)
3. Norrbotten County (1:15,676)
4. Stockholm County (1:23,868)
5. Södermanland County (1:25,383)
6. Halland County (1:25,483)
7. Västerbotten County (1:29,378)
8. Dalarna County (1:31,092)

== People ==
- Johan Vilhelm Snellman (1806–1881), Finnish philosopher and statesman
- Anita Snellman (1924–2006), Finnish painter
- Pentti Snellman (1926–2007), Finnish olympian
- Anja Snellman (born 1954), Finnish author
