= Jordan Brown (American football) =

American football player (born 1996)

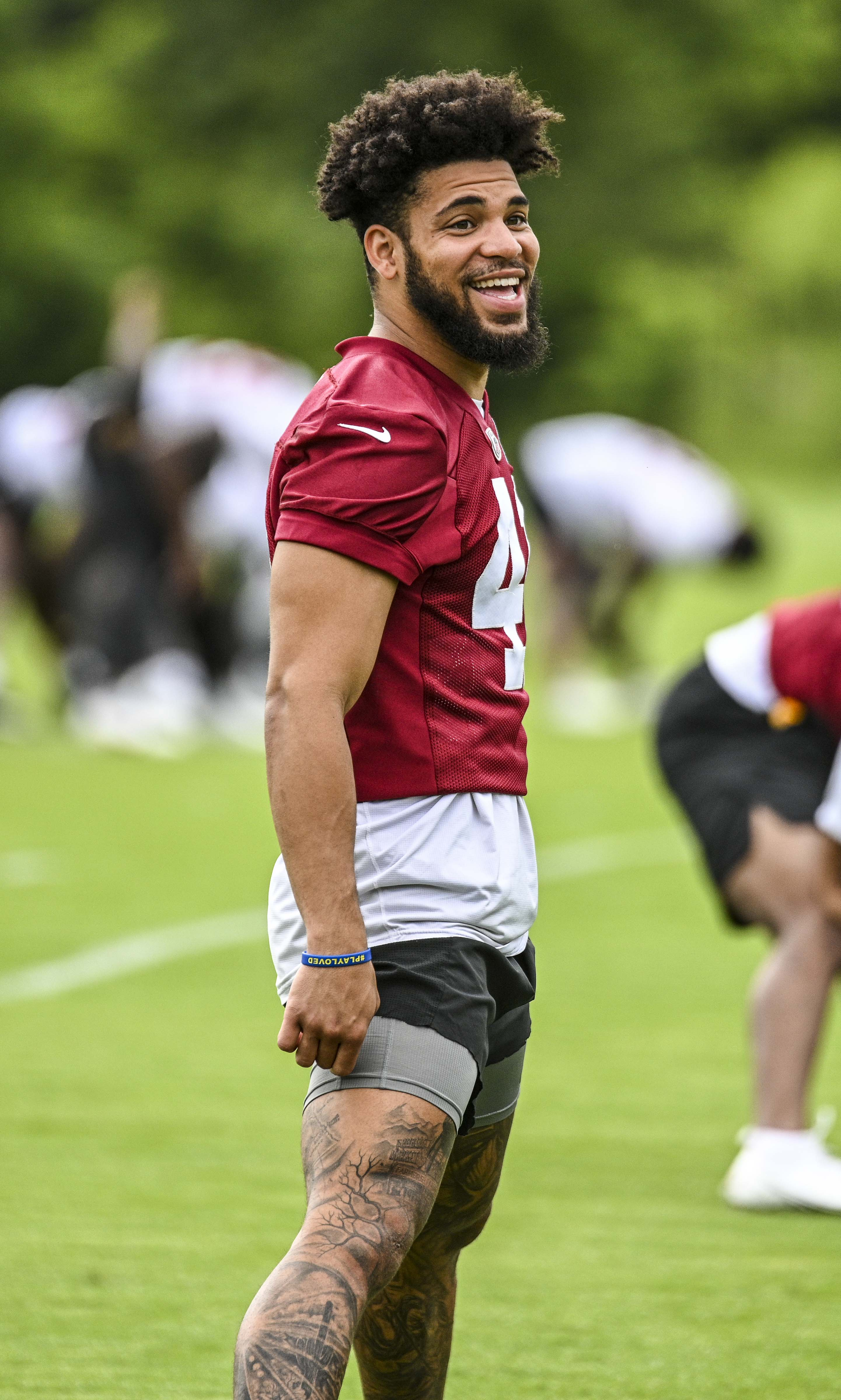
- Brown with the Washington Football Team in 2021

Profile
- Position: Cornerback

Personal information
- Born: March 26, 1996 (age 30); Omaha, Nebraska, U.S.
- Listed height: 6 ft 0 in (1.83 m)
- Listed weight: 201 lb (91 kg)

Career information
- High school: Paradise Valley (Phoenix, Arizona)
- College: South Dakota State (2014–2018)
- NFL draft: 2019: 7th round, 223rd overall pick

Career history
- Cincinnati Bengals (2019)*; Jacksonville Jaguars (2019)*; Oakland / Las Vegas Raiders (2019–2020)*; Washington Football Team (2020–2021)*; Las Vegas Raiders (2021); New Orleans Saints (2022)*
- * Offseason or practice squad member only

Awards and highlights
- 2× First-team All-MVFC (2017–2018)
- Stats at Pro Football Reference

Jordan Brown (born March 26, 1996) is an American former professional football cornerback. He played college football at South Dakota State and was selected by the Cincinnati Bengals in the seventh round of the 2019 NFL draft. He was also a member of the Jacksonville Jaguars, Oakland / Las Vegas Raiders, Washington Football Team and New Orleans Saints.

== Professional career ==
Pre-draft measurables
Height	Weight	Arm length	Hand span	40-yard dash	10-yard split	20-yard split	20-yard shuttle	Three-cone drill	Vertical jump	Broad jump	Bench press
6 ft 0 3/8 in (1.84 m)	201 lb (91 kg)	30 1/2 in (0.77 m)	9 5/8 in (0.24 m)	4.51 s	1.50 s	2.65 s	4.20 s	6.92 s	39.5 in (1.00 m)	10 ft 8 in (3.25 m)	13 reps
All values from NFL Combine/Pro Day

=== Cincinnati Bengals ===
Brown was selected by the Cincinnati Bengals in the seventh round (223rd overall) of the 2019 NFL draft. He was waived during final roster cuts on August 31, 2019.

=== Jacksonville Jaguars ===
On October 30, 2019, Brown was signed to the practice squad of the Jacksonville Jaguars. He was released on November 26, 2019.

=== Oakland / Las Vegas Raiders (first stint) ===
On December 4, 2019, Brown was signed to the Oakland Raiders practice squad. On December 30, 2019, Brown was signed to a reserve/future contract. He was waived on August 3, 2020. He was re-signed to the Raiders' practice squad on September 6, 2020. He was released on September 17.

=== Washington Football Team ===
On November 2, 2020, Brown was signed to the Washington Football Team's practice squad. On January 11, 2021, Brown signed a reserve/futures contract with the team; but was released on August 24, 2021.

=== Las Vegas Raiders (second stint) ===
On September 1, 2021, Brown was signed to the Las Vegas Raiders practice squad. After the Raiders were eliminated in the 2021 Wild Card round of the playoffs, he signed a reserve/future contract on January 17, 2022. On March 25, 2022, the Raiders cut Brown.

=== New Orleans Saints ===
On August 8, 2022, Brown signed with the New Orleans Saints. He was waived/injured a week later and placed on injured reserve. He was released on August 22. He was re-signed to the practice squad on October 4. He was released on November 1.
