= John Snell (15th-century MP) =

English politician

John Snell (fl. 1402) of Winchester, Hampshire, was an English politician.

He was a member (MP) of the parliament of England for Winchester in 1402.
