= Snellius =

Snellius may refer to:

- Rudolph Snellius (1546–1613), Dutch linguist and mathematician at the Universities of Marburg and Leiden
- Willebrord Snellius (1580–1626), Dutch astronomer and mathematician, most famous for the law of refraction now known as Snell's law
- Snellius (crater), a lunar crater located near the southeast limb of the Moon
- Vallis Snellius, a linear valley on the near side of the Moon
