= Richard Snell (businessman) =

American businessman

Richard A. Snell is an American businessman. He was the CEO of the Federal-Mogul Corporation, from 1996 to 2000.

Snell was Chief Executive Officer at Tenneco Automotive, from 1987 to 1996. Following that period, excessive debt load, and asbestos-related claims arising from the acquisition of companies/products having made historic use of asbestos, Federal Mogul, a supplier of pistons, piston rings, cylinder liners, gaskets, heat shields and other engine and drive train-related parts sought Chapter 11 protection on October 1, 2001.

He is currently a partner at Thayer Hidden Creek, and the Chief Executive Officer and Chairman at Qualitor.
