= Easton Stick =

American football player (born 1995)

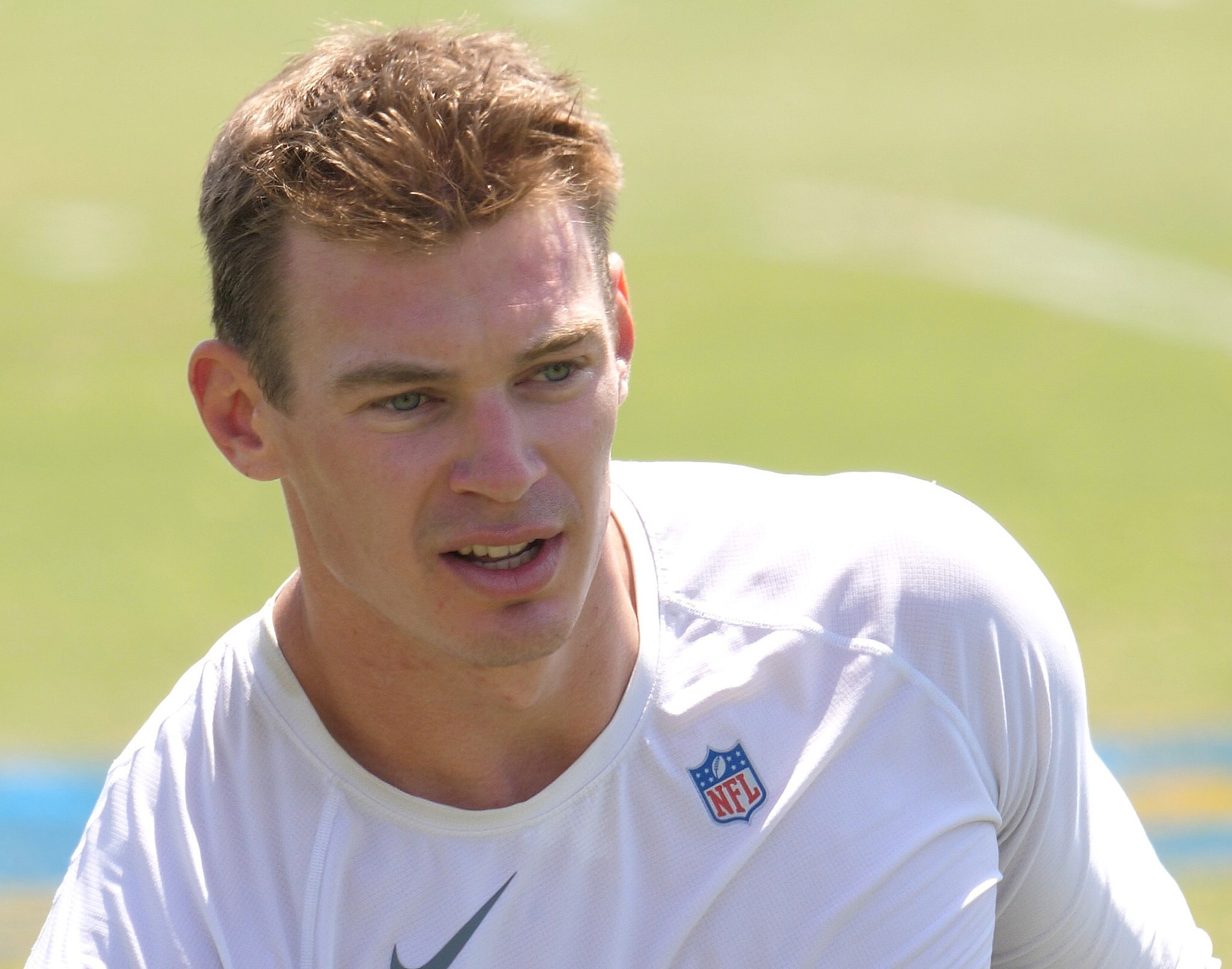
- Stick in 2022

No. 16 – Tampa Bay Buccaneers
- Position: Quarterback
- Roster status: Active

Personal information
- Born: September 15, 1995 (age 31); Omaha, Nebraska, U.S.
- Listed height: 6 ft 1 in (1.85 m)
- Listed weight: 224 lb (102 kg)

Career information
- High school: Creighton Preparatory School (Omaha)
- College: North Dakota State (2014–2018)
- NFL draft: 2019: 5th round, 166th overall pick

Career history
- Los Angeles Chargers (2019–2024); Atlanta Falcons (2025); Indianapolis Colts (2026)*; Tampa Bay Buccaneers (2026–present)
- * Offseason or practice squad member only

Awards and highlights
- 4× FCS national champion (2014, 2015, 2017, 2018); FCS First-team All-American (2018); First-team All-MVFC (2018); MVFC Offensive Player of the Year (2018)

Career NFL statistics as of 2025
- Passing attempts: 175
- Passing completions: 112
- Completion percentage: 64.0%
- TD–INT: 3–1
- Passing yards: 1,133
- Passer rating: 85.7
- Stats at Pro Football Reference

Easton Michael Stick (born September 15, 1995) is an American professional football quarterback for the Tampa Bay Buccaneers of the National Football League (NFL). He played college football for the North Dakota State Bison and was selected by the Los Angeles Chargers in the fifth round of the 2019 NFL draft.

== College career ==
Stick graduated from Creighton Preparatory School in Omaha, Nebraska, and played college football at North Dakota State University.

=== 2015 ===
Stick took his first snaps against the Weber State Wildcats where he ran for 24 yards on 3 attempts in a 41–14 win. His first start as a Bison was against the Indiana State Sycamores, where he passed for 126 yards and one touchdown in a 28–14 victory. In two games he threw for four touchdowns in each, being a 59–7 win against the Western Illinois Leathernecks, and a 55–0 win over the Missouri State Bears. The Bison went on to win the FCS Championship Game against Jacksonville State, 37–10.

=== 2016 ===
Stick earned the starting job after previous starter Carson Wentz was drafted by the Philadelphia Eagles. In Week 3 of the 2016 season, NDSU beat #13 Iowa Hawkeyes 23–21, in a game that went to a walk off field goal. Their lone loss in the regular season was against the South Dakota State Jackrabbits, in a game where SDSU would come back from a 17–3 deficit in the third quarter to beat NDSU on a 2 yard touchdown pass with 2 seconds remaining. They got revenge on them in the FCS Quarterfinals 36–10, again in Fargo. The Bison would lose 27–17 in the semifinals a week later against James Madison.

=== 2017 ===
In the first game of the 2017 season, NDSU beat Mississippi Valley State 72–7. The Bison had 683 total yards, including 498 yards rushing, and holding MVSU to just 58 yards.

With a 49–3 record as a starter at North Dakota State, Stick holds the record for most wins by a starting quarterback in Football Championship Subdivision history, shared with South Dakota State University quarterback Mark Gronowski.

College statistics

Season	Team	Games		Passing								Rushing			
Season	Team	GP	Record	Cmp	Att	Pct	Yds	Avg	TD	Int	Rtg	Att	Yds	Avg	TD
2014	NDSU	0	—	DNP											
2015	NDSU	11	8–0	90	147	61.2	1,144	7.8	13	4	150.3	85	498	5.9	5
2016	NDSU	14	12–2	169	288	58.7	2,331	8.1	19	9	142.2	113	685	6.1	7
2017	NDSU	15	14–1	164	264	62.1	2,466	9.3	28	8	169.5	112	663	5.9	12
2018	NDSU	15	15–0	175	281	62.3	2,752	9.8	28	7	172.4	117	677	5.7	17
Career		55	49–3	598	980	61.0	8,693	8.9	88	28	159.5	427	2,523	4.9	41

== Professional career ==
Pre-draft measurables
Height	Weight	Arm length	Hand span	Wingspan	40-yard dash	10-yard split	20-yard split	20-yard shuttle	Three-cone drill	Vertical jump	Broad jump	Wonderlic
6 ft 1 1/4 in (1.86 m)	224 lb (102 kg)	32 1/8 in (0.82 m)	9 1/4 in (0.23 m)	6 ft 4 1/8 in (1.93 m)	4.62 s	1.61 s	2.73 s	4.05 s	6.65 s	33.5 in (0.85 m)	9 ft 10 in (3.00 m)	32
All values from NFL Combine

=== Los Angeles Chargers ===
==== 2019–2022 ====
Stick was selected by the Los Angeles Chargers in the fifth round, 166th overall, of the 2019 NFL draft. In his rookie year, Stick took snaps in the preseason, but did not appear in any games in the regular season.

During the beginning of the 2020 season, Stick was expected to take over the backup quarterback position, replacing Tyrod Taylor. Instead, Chase Daniel was signed on as a backup while Stick was not set to play.

During Week 3 of the 2020 regular season, Stick briefly entered the game after starting quarterback Justin Herbert was apparently injured. Before Stick could take the first snap of his career, however, the Chargers called a timeout and substituted Herbert back into the game. Stick’s first action came later that season in Week 7 when Herbert was briefly taken out due to injury. He completed a pass for four yards and had a rush for negative two yards before Herbert came back in the game.

==== 2023–2024 ====
On March 13, 2023, the Chargers re-signed Stick to a one-year deal, keeping him as a backup for Herbert.

In Week 14, Stick was substituted for Herbert who suffered a finger injury in the second quarter. In his first game played since 2020, Stick threw for 179 yards in a 24–7 loss to the Denver Broncos.

On December 12, the Chargers announced that Stick would take over as the starter after it was revealed Herbert would need season-ending surgery. He started in four games to close out the 2023 season, all losses for the Chargers. Overall, he passed for 1,129 yards, 3 touchdowns, and 1 interception, along with a rushing touchdown.

Stick re-signed with the Chargers on March 16, 2024.

=== Atlanta Falcons ===
On April 21, 2025, Stick signed with the Atlanta Falcons. He was waived as a part of final roster cuts on August 26 and re-signed with the Falcons' practice squad the following day. Stick was elevated to the active roster for play on October 26. On November 19, he was signed to the active roster.

=== Indianapolis Colts ===
On June 1, 2026, Stick signed with the Indianapolis Colts. On August 30, Stick was released by Indianapolis as a part of final roster cuts.

=== Tampa Bay Buccaneers ===
On August 31, 2026, Stick was signed to the Tampa Bay Buccaneers' practice squad. On November 16, he was signed to the active roster.

== NFL career statistics ==
Legend
**Bold**	Career high

Year	Team	Games			Passing									Rushing					Sacks		Fumbles	
Year	Team	GP	GS	Record	Cmp	Att	Pct	Yds	Y/A	Lng	TD	Int	Rtg	Att	Yds	Y/A	Lng	TD	Sck	SckY	Fum	Lost
2019	LAC	0	0	—	DNP																	
2020	LAC	1	0	—	1	1	**100.0**	4	4.0	4	0	0	83.3	1	−2	−2.0	−2	0	0	0	0	0
2021	LAC	0	0	—	DNP																	
2022	LAC	0	0	—	DNP																	
2023	LAC	**5**	**4**	0−4	**111**	**174**	63.8	**1,129**	**6.5**	**79**	**3**	**1**	**85.6**	**27**	**144**	**5.3**	**21**	**1**	**14**	**122**	**5**	**4**
2024	LAC	0	0	—	DNP																	
2025	ATL	0	0	—	DNP																	
Career		6	4	0−4	112	175	64.0	1,133	6.5	79	3	1	85.7	28	142	5.1	21	1	14	122	5	4
