= Frida Snell =

Swedish pop/rock singer from Kiruna (born 1981)

Frida Snell (born 22 December 1981) is a Swedish pop/rock singer from Kiruna. She has roots in the village Erkheikki in Pajala municipality and now lives there. The debut album Black Trillium was released in 2002 and contains the hit single Lucky Day. In 2013, she released the album Wild Hearted Diamond with the music group Frida & the Coolants. She writes and produces her own music. She has also played bass, drums, guitar, and keyboard in a variety of bands based in her hometown.

Snell studied to be a forest officer at the Swedish University of Agricultural Sciences in Umeå, working from 2012 as environmental coordinator at Northland Resources, which conducts mining operations in Pajala Municipality.

Her record label is Stockholm Records, which has also signed Lisa Miskovsky, The Cardigans, and A Camp.

She cites The Cardigans as a musical influence.

She has sung a duet, "There's a Rock," with Swedish singer Brolle.
