= Nicholas Snell =

Nicholas Snell may refer to:

- Nicholas Snell (died 1577), MP for Chippenham, Malmesbury and Wiltshire
- Nicholas Snell (fl.1373-1388), MP for Stafford (UK Parliament constituency)
