= Schnell Group =

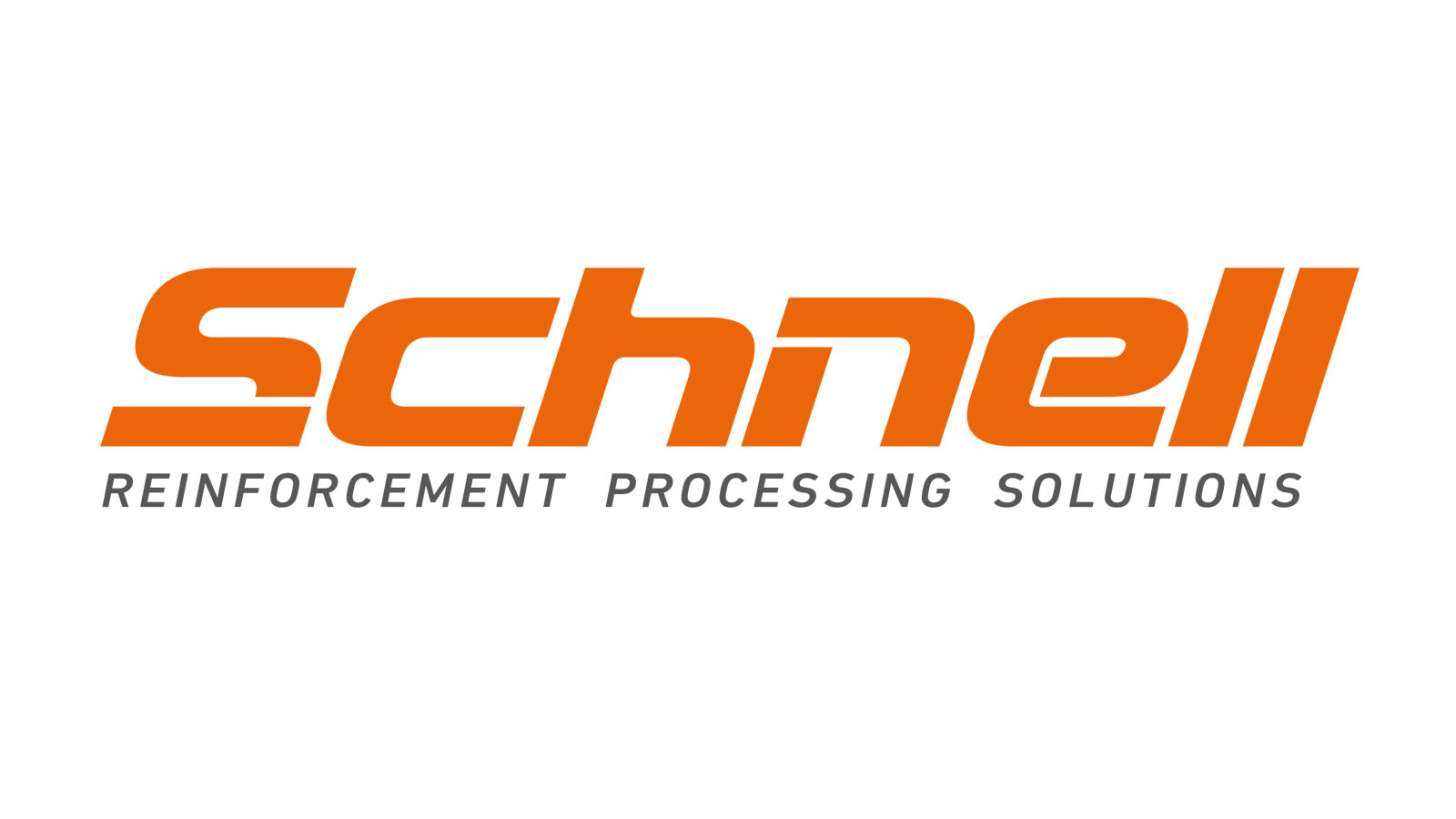

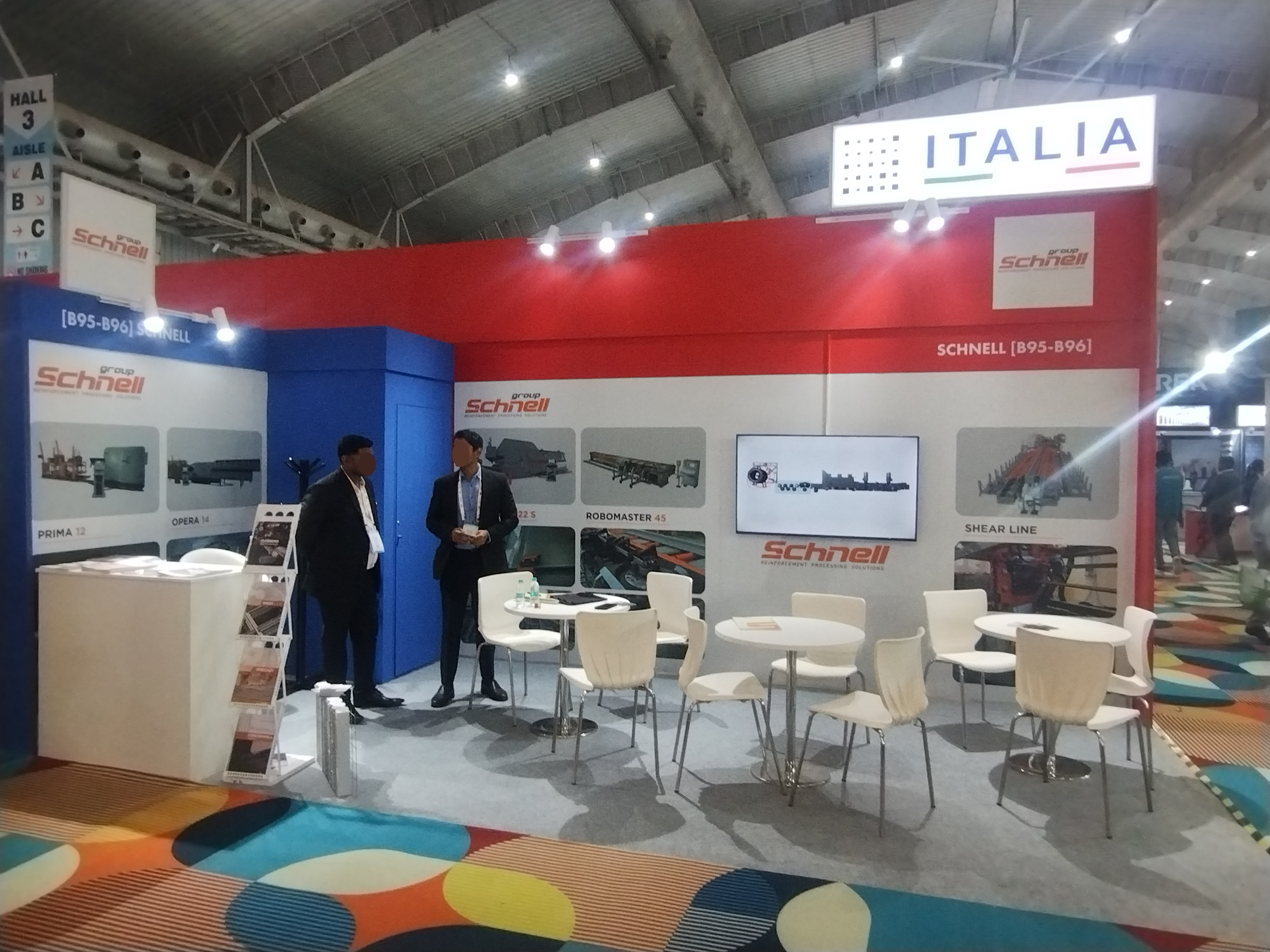
- Schnell Group at EXCON 2025, BIEC
- Trade name: Schnell
- Company type: S.p.A. (public limited company)
- Genre: Automatic machines
- Founded: August 2, 1962; 63 years ago in Fano, Italy
- Headquarters: Italy
- Area served: 150 countries
- Website: www.schnell.it/it/

Schnell Group is an Italian worldwide manufacturer of automatic machines for reinforcement processing.

== Company ==
Schnell Group operates in over 150 countries and produces 130 types of customizable machines. It has 5 factories around the world with a production area of over 60.000 sqm. and 650 employees

Schnell participated in EXCON 2025.

== History ==
Schnell Group was founded on 2 August 1962, in Fano.

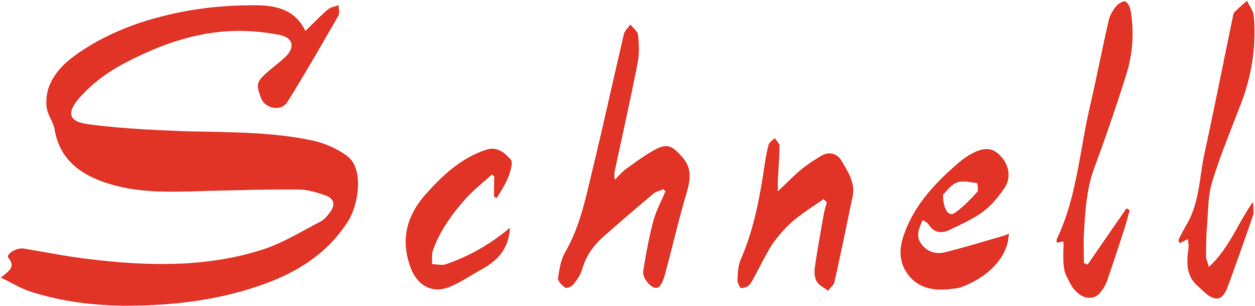
Schnell Group logo (1962 - 1964)
