= Edward Snell (cricketer) =

English cricketer

Personal information
- Full name: Edward Snell
- Born: 22 April 1906; Hove, Sussex, England
- Died: 6 September 1973 (aged 67); Hove, Sussex, England
- Batting: Right-handed
- Bowling: Right-arm slow

Domestic team information
- Years: Team
- 1927–1928: Sussex

Career statistics
Competition	First-class
Matches	3
Runs scored	13
Batting average	4.33
100s/50s	–/–
Top score	13
Balls bowled	–
Wickets	–
Bowling average	–
5 wickets in innings	–
10 wickets in match	–
Best bowling	–
Catches/stumpings	1/–
Medal record
Men's squash
British Amateur Championships
Silver medal – second place	1932	singles
Silver medal – second place	1935	singles
Silver medal – second place	1936	singles
- Source: Cricinfo, 30 November 2011

Edward Snell (22 April 1906 – 6 September 1973) was an English cricketer and squash player. Snell was a right-handed batsman who bowled right-arm slow.

== Biography ==
He was born at Hove, Sussex, educated at Winchester College. and studied at the University of Oxford.

Snell made three first-class appearances for Sussex, two in the 1927 County Championship against Worcestershire and Glamorgan, and one against Leicestershire in the 1928 County Championship. In his three first-class matches, he scored just 13 runs at an average of 4.33, with a high score of 13.

After his Sussex cricket days he played squash and was three-times the runner-up at the British Amateur Squash Championships behind the Egyptian Amr Bey in 1932, 1935 and 1936.

Snell was a teacher at Mowden School, Brighton and played for the Jesters Squash Club. He Represented Great Britain and captained the first British international team to tour the United States following two previous private British tours by Colonel Drysdale in 1924 and Victor Cazalet in 1927. The 1934 team consisted of Guy Jameson of the Royal Engineers, G. D'Oyly Sheppard, Derek B. Adams, John A. Gillies and Theodore H. Drysdale.

He died at the town of his birth on 6 September 1973.
