= Spencer Schnell =

American football player (born 1994)

No. 83
- Position: Wide receiver

Personal information
- Born: December 7, 1994 (age 31); Elkhart, Indiana, U.S.
- Listed height: 5 ft 8 in (1.73 m)
- Listed weight: 178 lb (81 kg)

Career information
- High school: Elkhart Central
- College: Illinois State
- NFL draft: 2019: undrafted

Career history
- Tampa Bay Buccaneers (2019)

Awards and highlights
- First-team All-MVFC (2018); Second-team All-MVFC (2017)

Career NFL statistics
- Return yards: 3
- Stats at Pro Football Reference

Spencer Schnell (born December 7, 1994) is an American former professional football player who was a wide receiver in the National Football League (NFL). He played college football for the Illinois State Redbirds.

== Early life ==
Schnell was born and grew up in Elkhart, Indiana, and attended Elkhart Central High School. He was named second-team All-Northern Indiana Athletic Conference (NIAC) after catching 58 passes for 984 yards and eight touchdowns in his junior season. As a senior, Schnell caught 101 passes for 1,458-yards and 11 touchdowns with two punts returned for touchdowns and was named first-team All-NIAC and first-team All-Region.

== College career ==
Schnell began his collegiate career at Ohio, joining the team as a walk-on and redshirting his true freshman season with the expectation that he would receive a scholarship the following year. He left the school after the scholarship was instead given to a fifth year player and transferred to Illinois State University. He spent a year away from football as he established residency in Illinois to pay in-state tuition before joining the Illinois State football team as a walk-on. In his first season playing, Schnell caught 59 passes for 479 yards and a touchdown and returned 22 punts for 228 yards and was named to the Missouri Valley Football Conference (MVFC) All-Newcomer team. The following season, he was named second-team All-MVFC after leading the team with 51 receptions for 679 yards and four touchdowns. As a redshirt senior, Schnell led the MVC with 65 receptions and was second in the conference with 872 receiving yards and nine touchdowns and was named first-team All-MVFC.

== Professional career ==
Schnell signed with the Tampa Bay Buccaneers as an undrafted free agent on May 11, 2019. Schnell was waived at the end of training camp during final roster cuts. He was re-signed by the Buccaneers to their practice squad on December 16, and was promoted to the Buccaneers' active roster two days later on December 18. Schnell made his NFL debut on December 21, against the Houston Texans, returning two punts for three yards.

On July 31, 2020, Schnell was waived by the Buccaneers. Schnell visited the Buccaneers on August 23, and was re-signed by the team on August 25. He was waived by Tampa Bay on September 5.

== Personal ==
Schnell's father, Dave Schnell, was the starting quarterback at Indiana, was an All-Big Ten selection and inducted into the school's athletic hall of fame, and later played quarterback for the Buffalo Bills. Dave Schnell died of leukemia at the age of 44 when Spencer was 16 years old.
