= Snellen =

Snellen is a Dutch surname. Snel means "quick" in Dutch and the original bearer of the name may have been a lively person. However, the origin of the surname often was patronymic, as Snel and Snelle were short forms of the archaic Germanic given name Snellaard (which originally meant "lively and strong"). People with this surname include:

- Herman Snellen (1834–1908), Dutch ophthalmologist
- Ignas Snellen (born 1970), Dutch astronomer
- Johan Snellen (1642–1691), Dutch Naval Officer
- Maurits Snellen (1840–1907), Dutch meteorologist and explorer of the Arctic
- Pieter Cornelius Tobias Snellen (1834–1911), Dutch entomologist
- Samuel Constantinus Snellen van Vollenhoven (1816–1880), Dutch entomologist

== See also ==
- Snellen chart, an eye chart developed by Herman Snellen
