= Fargodome =

Stadium in Fargo, North Dakota

Coordinates: 46°54′11″N 96°48′6″W

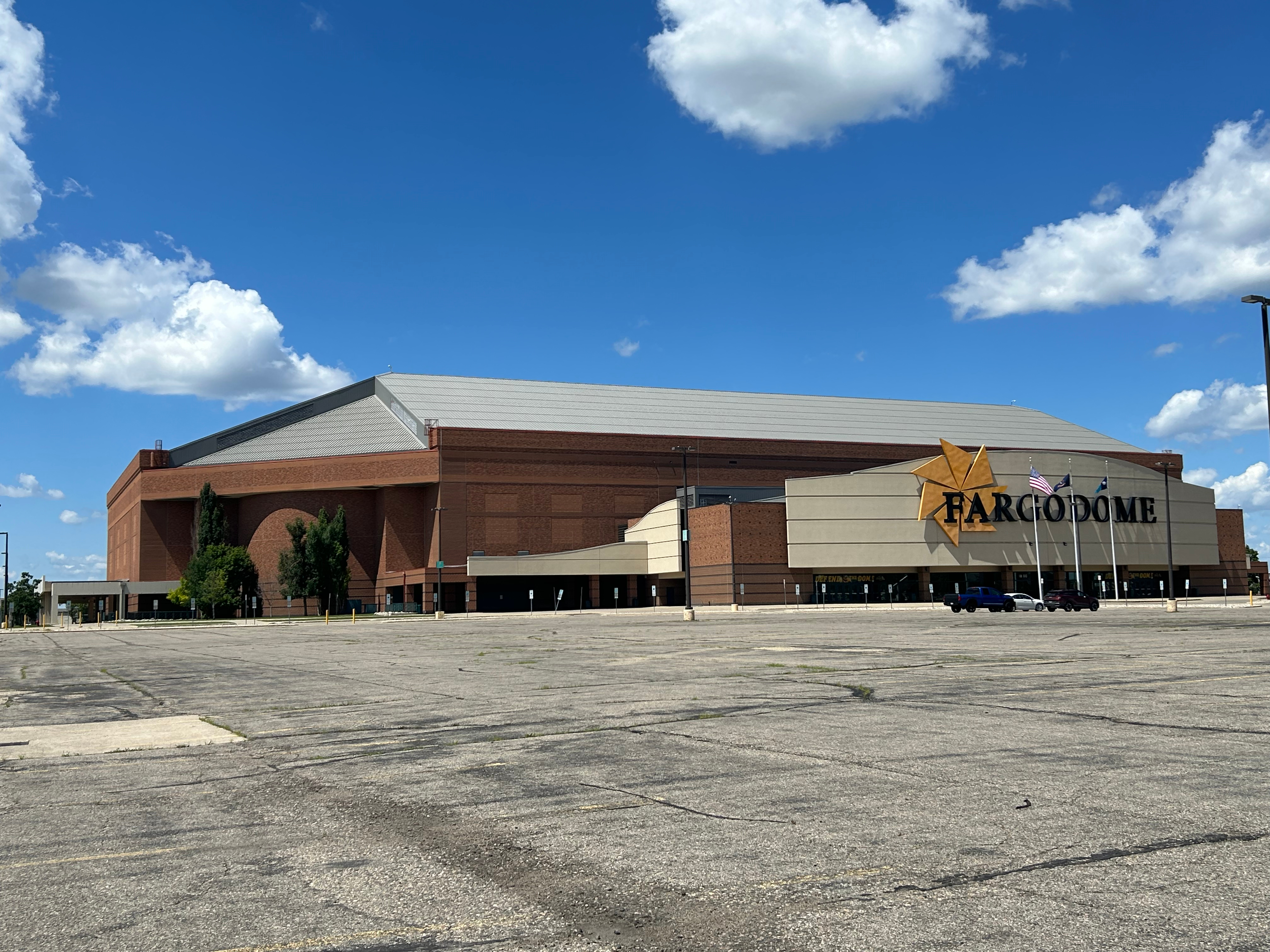
- Fargodome in July 2024

- Location in the United States Location in North Dakota
- Interactive map of Fargodome
- Full name: Gate City Bank Field at the Fargodome
- Address: 1800 University Dr N
- Location: North Dakota State University; Fargo, North Dakota, U.S.
- Elevation: 900 feet (275 m) AMSL
- Owner: City of Fargo
- Operator: Fargo Dome Authority
- Capacity: 18,700 (football) Concerts: Gate City Bank Theater: 3,500; Half house: 11,000; 3/4 house: 16,000; End stage: 22,000; Center stage: 26,700
- Surface: Artificial turf
- Record attendance: 19,108 October 12, 2013 vs. Missouri State

Construction
- Groundbreaking: April 26, 1990
- Opened: December 2, 1992; 33 years ago
- Cost: $48 million ($118 million in 2025)
- Architects: Sink, Combs, Dethlefs; Triebwasser, Helenske & Associates
- General contractors: Industrial Builders, Inc.
- Main contractor: Meinecke-Johnson

Tenants
- Fargo-Moorhead Fever (CBA) (1992–1994); Fargo-Moorhead Beez (CBA) (2001–2002); North Dakota State Bison (NCAA) (1993–present); Fargo Freeze (IFL) (2000)

Fargodome is an indoor athletic stadium and convention center in the north central United States, located on the campus of North Dakota State University (NDSU) in Fargo, North Dakota. It opened in 1992 and is owned and operated by the city despite being built on the university's campus. It has a seating capacity of 18,700 for football and over 25,000 for full arena concerts. Its approximate elevation at street level is 900 feet (275 m) above sea level.

Gate City Bank Field at the Fargodome is the home field of the Bison football team, which competes in the National Collegiate Athletic Association (NCAA) at the Division I level in the Football Bowl Subdivision (FBS). NDSU is a member of the Mountain West, and prior to the 1993 season, the football venue was Dacotah Field, adjacent to the south. The stadium also hosts the university's commencement ceremonies as well as many large concerts, other sporting events, and trade shows.

== History ==
Interior during a 2026 NDSU football game.

The building was originally planned to be modeled on the Tacoma Dome but have an inflatable roof. However, as the design evolved, it was decided to have a fixed hard roof, although the dome name stuck.

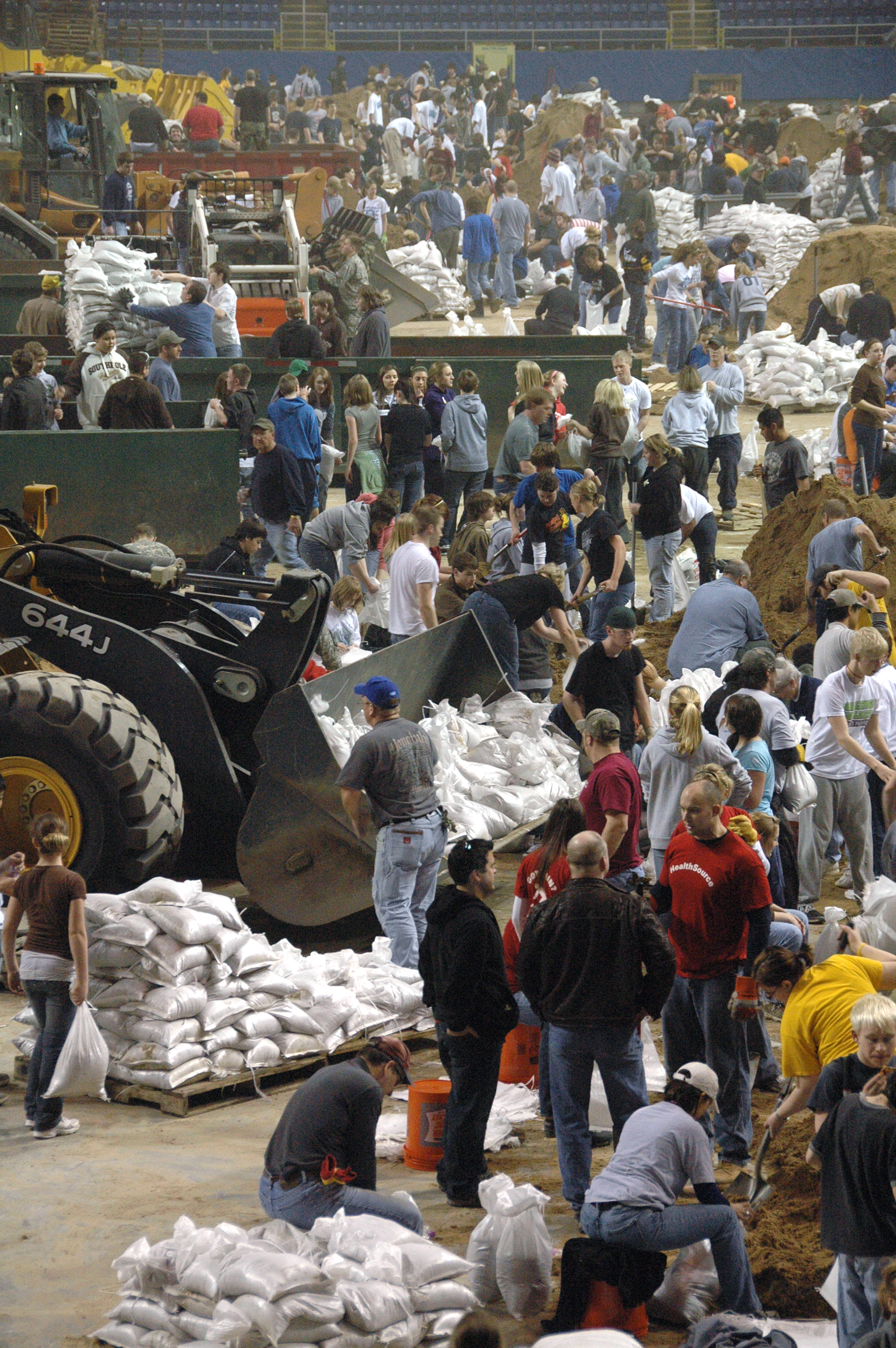
Volunteers fill sandbags in the Fargodome during the 2009 Red River flood

- November 1987: Fargo Parks Superintendent Bob Johnson and City Council President Ranen Nicholson proposed a plan for convention and athletic facilities in Fargo.
- January 1988: Proposed plan was modified to include a single stadium to be built on North Dakota State University land, that would be financed in part by a half-cent sales tax.
- December 1988: Voters approved half-cent sales tax
- April 1989: Architects hired and construction process begins
- December 1992: Fargodome opens
- January 1994: Hosts Snow Bowl NCAA Division II football all-star game between 1994 and 2000
- December 2002: Fargodome celebrates its 10th anniversary
- December 2006: Initial talks underway to attach a 6,000–9,000-seat stadium to the Fargodome, for use as a basketball arena for the North Dakota State University basketball teams, as well as smaller performances.
- March 2009: The Fargodome is used for the filling and storage of sandbags during the flood.
- August 31, 2012: The newly installed AstroTurf, funded by a $1 million donation from Gate City Bank and Fargodome reserve funds for total cost of $2.9 million, premiered in the North Dakota State Bison football team's first game of the season against Robert Morris. Gate City Bank’s donation led to renaming of the field after the company.
- October 10, 2012: The Fargodome hosted a preseason NBA game between the Indiana Pacers and Minnesota Timberwolves. The Timberwolves won the game 84–70.
- August 2016: Replaced 4 older corner video boards with new HD boards, and added 2 new large (100'x30') Video Screens at a cost of $7.7 million.
- July 2022: Replaced the older version AstroTurf with a new version, funded by the Fargodome's reserve funds for a total price of $1.1 million, which also includes upgrades to the Magic Carpet system that rolls out the turf onto the stadium floor.
- August 2023: Proposed renovation plans were unveiled for the Fargodome. The plans would add on a convention center space to the south side of the dome that would eliminate the south parking lot. The plans also called for a new upper level concourse in the southeast corner of the stadium, a remodel of the press box on the east side, removal of the never-used north side press box, and a new club level lounge at the top of the west side. Lastly, the project calls for a removal of Albrecht Boulevard on the west side of the dome, to make way for an addition to the building and move the tailgating lot closer to the stadium. The proposed cost is $140 million and is planned to be paid for with $30 million from the Fargodome's reserve fund, as well as a quarter-cent city sales tax increase and a three percent lodging tax increase. Fargo residents voted on the proposed renovation plan during a special election in December, in which the measure failed. 52% of the votes cast were in favor of the renovation, but the measure needed 60% to pass.

== Events and acts ==
The Fargodome has held events such as the Ringling Bros. and Barnum & Bailey Circus, USHRA's Monster Jam, Happy Harry's Ribfest, World Wrestling Entertainment, World Championship Wrestling, and other local, regional, and national events. The facility briefly played host to the Fargo Freeze Indoor Football League team in 2000, though the team played just one season.

=== Amateur wrestling ===
The USA Wrestling 16U/Junior National Wrestling Championships (Women's and Men's Freestyle, Men's Greco-Roman) takes place every year in the Fargodome in the month of July.

=== Entertainment ===
Many famous acts have played at the Fargodome. It is also capable of hosting events on ice such as Disney on Ice and traveling broadway.

Date	Artist(s)	Opening act(s)	Event Name	Attendance	Revenue	Notes
March 21, 1993	Guns N' Roses	Brian May Band	Use Your Illusion Tour	—	—	
December 8, 1997	Prince	—	Jam of the Year World Tour	—	—	
September 18, 1998	Garth Brooks	—	The Garth Brooks World Tour	—	—	
September 19, 1998	Garth Brooks	—	The Garth Brooks World Tour	—	—	
September 20, 1998	Garth Brooks	—	The Garth Brooks World Tour	—	—	
December 5, 1998	Shania Twain	Leahy	Come On Over Tour	—	—	
February 17, 1999	The Rolling Stones	Jonny Lang	No Security Tour	21,970 / 21,970	$1,501,183	
November 6, 1999	Bruce Springsteen & The E Street Band	—	Reunion Tour	17,245 / 20,000	—	
December 3, 1999	NSYNC	—	NSYNC in Concert	—	—	
September 29, 2002	Bruce Springsteen & The E Street Band	—	The Rising Tour	—	—	
August 17, 2004	Metallica	—	Madly in Anger with the World Tour	—	—	
September 6, 2013	Taylor Swift	Ed Sheeran; Casey James	The Red Tour	21,073 / 21,073	$1,661,578	
January 11, 2014	Pink	The Kin	The Truth About Love Tour	21,879 / 21,879	$1,613,670	This show was originally scheduled to take place on October 27, 2013, but was postponed due to vocal rest. This concert used to hold the record for highest attendance and ticket sells record in the venue's history, until she broke her own record in 2019.
February 7, 2014	Justin Timberlake	DJ Freestyle	The 20/20 Experience World Tour	15,639 / 15,639	$1,329,810	This was his first concert in the state of North Dakota.
February 14, 2014	Toby Mac	—	Hits Deep Tour	–	–	
July 12, 2014	Paul McCartney	—	Out There	18,220 / 18,220	$2,247,472	This was his first concert in the state of North Dakota.
August 23, 2014	Katy Perry	Kacey Musgraves; Ferras	Prismatic World Tour	21,843 / 21,843	$1,660,459	
November 16, 2014	Mötley Crüe	—	The Final Tour	-	-	
October 12, 2015	Taylor Swift	Vance Joy	The 1989 World Tour	21,067 / 21,067	$2,219,188	This concert was originally planned to take place on September 9, but was postponed to October 12 to avoid any potential scheduling conflict with the Houston Astros potentially making the 2015 Major League Baseball postseason.
February 11, 2016	AC/DC	Tyler Bryant & The Shakedown	Rock or Bust World Tour	19,308 / 19,308	$2,049,080	
May 5, 2016	Garth Brooks	—	The Garth Brooks World Tour with Trisha Yearwood	73,480	$5,100,000	
May 6, 2016	Garth Brooks	—	The Garth Brooks World Tour with Trisha Yearwood	73,480	$5,100,000	
May 7, 2016	Garth Brooks	—	The Garth Brooks World Tour with Trisha Yearwood	73,480	$5,100,000	
May 8, 2016	Garth Brooks	—	The Garth Brooks World Tour with Trisha Yearwood	73,480	$5,100,000	
June 4, 2016	James Taylor	–	Before this World Tour	–	–	
June 18, 2016	Justin Bieber	Post Malone; Moxie Raia	Purpose World Tour	12,451 / 12,451	$1,177,819	
August 4, 2017	Bruno Mars	Camila Cabello	24K Magic World Tour	–	–	
August 24, 2017	Tim McGraw and Faith Hill	Natalie Hemby	Soul2Soul: The World Tour	–	–	
October 17, 2018	Ed Sheeran	Snow Patrol; Lauv	Divide Tour	17,762 / 17,762	$1,766,790	
May 4, 2019	Pink	Julia Michaels	Beautiful Trauma World Tour	22,164 / 22,164	$2,927,135	
September 14, 2019	Bob Seger	-	Roll Me Away: The Final Tour	-	-	
October 30, 2019	Celine Dion	—	Courage World Tour	10,473 / 12,239	$1,174,539	
August 11, 2021	Guns N' Roses	Mammoth WVH	Guns N' Roses 2020 Tour	9,100 / 10,087	$988,411	
July 27, 2022	Machine Gun Kelly	Avril Lavigne; Willow	Mainstream Sellout Tour	11,908 / 11,908	$714,355	
April 6, 2023	Red Hot Chili Peppers	The Strokes; King Princess	Unlimited Love Tour	19,331 / 19,311	$2,067,826	
August 11, 2023	Def Leppard; Mötley Crüe	Alice Cooper	The World Tour	-	-	
August 19, 2023	Pink	Brandi Carlile; Grouplove; KidCutUp	Summer Carnival	-	-	
November 5, 2023	Shania Twain	Lily Rose	Queen of Me Tour	-	-	
September 12, 2026	Foo Fighters	Mannequin Pussy	Take Cover Tour	-	-	

=== Gate City Bank Theater ===
The Fargodome's Gate City Bank Theater is home to theatrical productions, produced locally and touring.

== Expansion and renovations ==
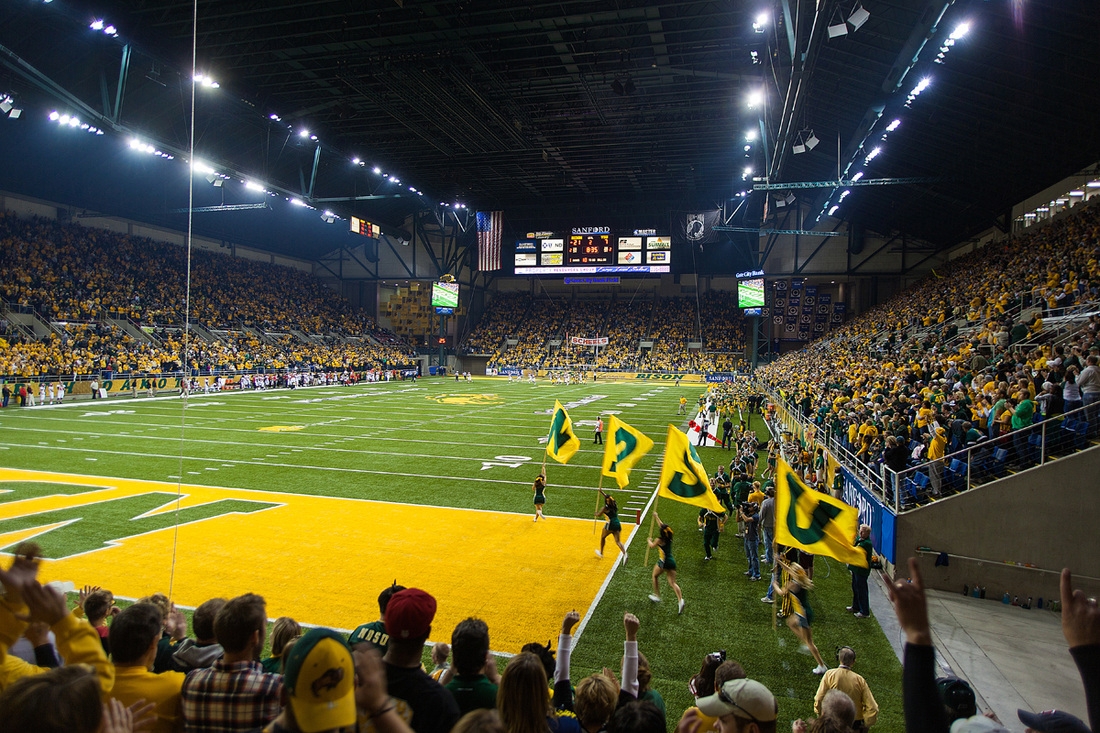
The Fargodome during a North Dakota State Bison football game

In summer 2016, the stadium video boards were replaced with 12 new interior displays featuring SMD LED technology including two large 30'x100' High Definition video/scoreboards on each endzone, 12'x24' screens behind those large screens for those seated behind the board, and four large 20'x22' High Definition video boards (one in each corner), the $7.7 million project also provided for four ribbon displays on the seating fascia 3' high and 33' long along with a portable 15' x 25' screen which can be moved around on gameday, the project also renovated the electronics room and provided for new computer and graphics technology. These screens replaced the 6 old boards installed in 2002. In total, the new boards provide for 8,500 square feet (790 m^{2}) of LED boards in the dome. The contract also provided for an increase from 3 to 5 High Definition cameras for additional angles, one of the cameras has a 55x extra zoom for close up play.

In the summer of 2022, the stadium replaced its aging AstroTurf with a newer version. It cost the Fargodome $1.1 million, which it paid for using the stadium reserve funds, that also included upgrades to the Magic Carpet system that rolls out the turf onto the stadium floor.

The Fargodome has previously studied an expansion of its permanent seating in response to increased attendance at NDSU football games. Additional seating would require major structural changes to the dome, including moving the press boxes from the east side to the west side. The west side has been reinforced and could handle extra levels, whereas the east side has a lobby that was not designed to bear any extra load. Attendance at NDSU football games has declined in recent years. During the 2022 season, only one of the team's three home playoff games drew more than 13,000 attendees.

In 2023, the Fargodome Authority proposed a $131 million project to remodel the facility and add a conference center. The group proposed new 20-year-long sales and lodging taxes to help fund the project. The proposed tax increases to fund the project were rejected by voters in a special election on December 5, 2023. A similar proposal was put on the ballot in 2024, but again failed to pass.

== See also ==
- List of NCAA Division I FBS football stadiums
- Fill the Dome
