= List of Missouri Valley Football Conference standings =

This is a list of yearly Missouri Valley Football Conference standings.

== Missouri Valley standings ==
=== Gateway Football Conference ===
1985 Gateway Collegiate Athletic Conference football standings
	Conf.					Overall
Team	W		L		T	W		L		T
No. 4 Northern Iowa $^	5	–	0	–	0	11	–	2	–	0
Southwest Missouri State	2	–	2	–	1	6	–	4	–	1
Western Illinois	2	–	3	–	0	5	–	5	–	0
Southern Illinois	2	–	3	–	0	4	–	7	–	0
Eastern Illinois	2	–	3	–	0	6	–	5	–	0
Illinois State	1	–	3	–	1	6	–	3	–	2
$ – Conference champion; ^ – NCAA Division I-AA playoff participant; Rankings from NCAA Division I-AA Football Committee poll

1986 Gateway Collegiate Athletic Conference football standings
	Conf.					Overall
Team	W		L		T	W		L		T
No. 3 Eastern Illinois $^	5	–	1	–	0	11	–	2	–	0
No. 17 Southern Illinois	4	–	2	–	0	7	–	4	–	0
Northern Iowa	4	–	2	–	0	7	–	3	–	1
Illinois State	3	–	3	–	0	5	–	5	–	0
Western Illinois	2	–	4	–	0	6	–	5	–	0
SW Missouri State	1	–	5	–	0	3	–	7	–	0
Indiana State	1	–	5	–	0	3	–	8	–	0
$ – Conference champion; ^ – NCAA Division I-AA playoff participant; Rankings from NCAA Division I-AA Football Committee poll

1987 Gateway Collegiate Athletic Conference football standings
	Conf.					Overall
Team	W		L		T	W		L		T
No. 4 Northern Iowa $^	6	–	0	–	0	10	–	4	–	0
Western Illinois	5	–	1	–	0	7	–	4	–	0
Eastern Illinois	3	–	3	–	0	5	–	6	–	0
SW Missouri State	3	–	3	–	0	5	–	6	–	0
Indiana State	2	–	4	–	0	5	–	6	–	0
Southern Illinois	2	–	4	–	0	3	–	8	–	0
Illinois State	0	–	6	–	0	3	–	7	–	0
$ – Conference champion; ^ – NCAA Division I-AA playoff participant; Rankings from NCAA Division I-AA Football Committee poll

1988 Gateway Collegiate Athletic Conference football standings
	Conf.					Overall
Team	W		L		T	W		L		T
No. 3 Western Illinois $^	6	–	0	–	0	10	–	2	–	0
Southwest Missouri State	4	–	2	–	0	5	–	5	–	0
Indiana State	4	–	2	–	0	5	–	6	–	0
Northern Iowa	3	–	3	–	0	5	–	6	–	0
Eastern Illinois	2	–	4	–	0	5	–	6	–	0
Southern Illinois	2	–	4	–	0	4	–	7	–	0
Illinois State	0	–	6	–	0	1	–	10	–	0
$ – Conference champion; ^ – NCAA Division I-AA playoff participant; Rankings from NCAA Division I-AA Football Committee poll

1989 Gateway Collegiate Athletic Conference football standings
	Conf.					Overall
Team	W		L		T	W		L		T
No. 9 Southwest Missouri State $^	5	–	1	–	0	10	–	3	–	0
No. 15 Eastern Illinois ^	4	–	2	–	0	9	–	4	–	0
No. 20 Northern Iowa	4	–	2	–	0	8	–	3	–	0
Illinois State	4	–	2	–	0	5	–	6	–	0
Indiana State	2	–	4	–	0	4	–	7	–	0
Western Illinois	1	–	5	–	0	4	–	7	–	0
Southern Illinois	1	–	5	–	0	2	–	9	–	0
$ – Conference champion; ^ – NCAA Division I-AA playoff participant; Rankings from NCAA Division I-AA Football Committee poll

1990 Gateway Collegiate Athletic Conference football standings
	Conf.					Overall
Team	W		L		T	W		L		T
No. 6 Southwest Missouri State +^	5	–	1	–	0	9	–	3	–	0
No. 11 Northern Iowa +^	5	–	1	–	0	8	–	4	–	0
Eastern Illinois	3	–	3	–	0	5	–	6	–	0
Illinois State	3	–	3	–	0	5	–	6	–	0
Western Illinois	3	–	3	–	0	3	–	8	–	0
Indiana State	1	–	5	–	0	4	–	7	–	0
Southern Illinois	1	–	5	–	0	2	–	9	–	0
+ – Conference co-champions; ^ – NCAA Division I-AA playoff participant; Rankings from NCAA Division I-AA Football Committee poll

1991 Gateway Collegiate Athletic Conference football standings
	Conf.					Overall
Team	W		L		T	W		L		T
No. 4 Northern Iowa $^	5	–	1	–	0	11	–	2	–	0
No. 14 Western Illinois ^	4	–	2	–	0	7	–	4	–	1
Southern Illinois	4	–	2	–	0	7	–	4	–	0
Southwest Missouri State	3	–	3	–	0	6	–	4	–	1
Indiana State	2	–	4	–	0	5	–	6	–	0
Eastern Illinois	2	–	4	–	0	4	–	7	–	0
Illinois State	1	–	5	–	0	5	–	6	–	0
$ – Conference champion; ^ – NCAA Division I-AA playoff participant; Rankings from NCAA Division I-AA Football Committee poll

1992 Gateway Football Conference standings
	Conf.					Overall
Team	W		L		T	W		L		T
No. 3 Northern Iowa $^	5	–	1	–	0	12	–	2	–	0
No. 20 Western Illinois	4	–	2	–	0	7	–	4	–	0
Southwest Missouri State	4	–	2	–	0	6	–	5	–	0
Eastern Illinois	2	–	4	–	0	5	–	6	–	0
Illinois State	2	–	4	–	0	5	–	6	–	0
Indiana State	2	–	4	–	0	4	–	7	–	0
Southern Illinois	2	–	4	–	0	4	–	7	–	0
$ – Conference champion; ^ – NCAA Division I-AA playoff participant; Rankings from NCAA Division I-AA Football Committee poll

1993 Gateway Football Conference standings
	Conf.					Overall
Team	W		L		T	W		L		T
No. 13 Northern Iowa $^	5	–	1	–	0	8	–	4	–	0
Southwest Missouri State	4	–	2	–	0	7	–	4	–	0
Western Illinois	4	–	2	–	0	4	–	7	–	0
Illinois State	2	–	3	–	1	6	–	4	–	1
Eastern Illinois	2	–	3	–	1	3	–	7	–	1
Indiana State	2	–	4	–	0	4	–	7	–	0
Southern Illinois	1	–	5	–	0	2	–	9	–	0
$ – Conference champion; ^ – NCAA Division I-AA playoff participant; Rankings from The Sports Network poll

1994 Gateway Football Conference standings
	Conf.					Overall
Team	W		L		T	W		L		T
No. 11 Northern Iowa $^	6	–	0	–	0	8	–	4	–	0
No. 24 Western Illinois	4	–	2	–	0	8	–	3	–	0
Eastern Illinois	4	–	2	–	0	6	–	5	–	0
Illinois State	3	–	3	–	0	5	–	5	–	1
Indiana State	2	–	4	–	0	5	–	6	–	0
Southwest Missouri State	2	–	4	–	0	4	–	7	–	0
Southern Illinois	0	–	6	–	0	1	–	10	–	0
$ – Conference champion; ^ – NCAA Division I-AA playoff participant; Rankings from The Sports Network poll

1995 Gateway Football Conference standings
	Conf.					Overall
Team	W		L		T	W		L		T
No. 12 Eastern Illinois +^	5	–	1	–	0	10	–	2	–	0
No. 18 Northern Iowa +^	5	–	1	–	0	8	–	5	–	0
No. 24 Indiana State	3	–	3	–	0	7	–	4	–	0
Illinois State	3	–	3	–	0	5	–	6	–	0
Southern Illinois	2	–	4	–	0	5	–	6	–	0
Western Illinois	2	–	4	–	0	4	–	7	–	0
Southwest Missouri State	1	–	5	–	0	4	–	7	–	0
$ – Conference champion; ^ – NCAA Division I-AA playoff participant; Rankings from The Sports Network poll

1996 Gateway Football Conference standings
	Conf.			Overall
Team	W		L	W		L
No. 3 Northern Iowa $^	5	–	0	12	–	2
No. 10 Western Illinois ^	3	–	2	9	–	3
No. 21 Southwest Missouri State	3	–	2	7	–	4
Indiana State	3	–	2	6	–	5
Southern Illinois	1	–	4	5	–	6
Illinois State	0	–	5	3	–	8
$ – Conference champion; ^ – NCAA Division I-AA playoff participant; Rankings from The Sports Network poll

1997 Gateway Football Conference standings
	Conf.			Overall
Team	W		L	W		L
No. 2 Western Illinois $^	6	–	0	11	–	2
Northern Iowa	5	–	1	7	–	4
No. 4 Youngstown State ^	4	–	2	13	–	2
Southwest Missouri State	3	–	3	5	–	6
Indiana State	2	–	4	3	–	8
Southern Illinois	1	–	5	3	–	8
Illinois State	0	–	6	2	–	9
$ – Conference champion; ^ – NCAA Division I-AA playoff participant; Rankings from The Sports Network poll

1998 Gateway Football Conference standings
	Conf.			Overall
Team	W		L	W		L
No. 4 Western Illinois $^	5	–	1	11	–	3
No. 16 Illinois State ^	4	–	2	8	–	4
Northern Iowa	3	–	3	7	–	4
Youngstown State	3	–	3	6	–	5
Southwest Missouri State	3	–	3	5	–	6
Indiana State	2	–	4	5	–	6
Southern Illinois	1	–	5	3	–	8
$ – Conference champion; ^ – NCAA Division I-AA playoff participant; Rankings from The Sports Network poll

1999 Gateway Football Conference standings
	Conf.			Overall
Team	W		L	W		L
No. 3 Illinois State $^	6	–	0	11	–	3
No. 2 Youngstown State ^	5	–	1	12	–	3
No. 15 Northern Iowa	3	–	3	8	–	3
Western Illinois	2	–	4	7	–	4
Southwest Missouri State	2	–	4	5	–	6
Indiana State	2	–	4	3	–	8
Southern Illinois	1	–	5	5	–	6
$ – Conference champion; ^ – NCAA Division I-AA playoff participant; Rankings from The Sports Network poll

2000 Gateway Football Conference standings
	Conf.			Overall
Team	W		L	W		L
No. 12 Western Illinois $^	5	–	1	9	–	3
No. 11 Youngstown State ^	4	–	2	9	–	3
No. 24 Illinois State	4	–	2	7	–	4
No. 19 Northern Iowa	3	–	3	7	–	4
Southwest Missouri State	2	–	4	5	–	6
Southern Illinois	2	–	4	3	–	8
Indiana State	1	–	5	1	–	10
$ – Conference champion; ^ – NCAA Division I-AA playoff participant; Rankings from The Sports Network poll

2001 Gateway Football Conference standings
	Conf.			Overall
Team	W		L	W		L
No. 4 Northern Iowa $^	6	–	1	11	–	3
No. 12 Western Kentucky ^	5	–	2	8	–	4
No. 15 Youngstown State	5	–	2	8	–	3
Western Illinois	4	–	3	5	–	5
Southwest Missouri State	3	–	4	6	–	5
Indiana State	2	–	5	3	–	8
Illinois State	2	–	5	2	–	9
Southern Illinois	1	–	6	1	–	10
$ – Conference champion; ^ – NCAA Division I-AA playoff participant; Rankings from The Sports Network poll

2002 Gateway Football Conference standings
	Conf.			Overall
Team	W		L	W		L
No. 1 Western Kentucky +^	6	–	1	12	–	3
No. 5 Western Illinois +^	6	–	1	11	–	2
Youngstown State	4	–	3	7	–	4
Illinois State	4	–	3	6	–	5
Indiana State	3	–	4	5	–	7
Northern Iowa	2	–	5	5	–	6
Southern Illinois	2	–	5	4	–	8
Southwest Missouri State	1	–	6	4	–	7
+ – Conference co-champions; ^ – NCAA Division I-AA playoff participant; Rankings from The Sports Network poll

2003 Gateway Football Conference standings
	Conf.			Overall
Team	W		L	W		L
No. 5 Northern Iowa +^	6	–	1	10	–	3
No. 9 Southern Illinois +^	6	–	1	10	–	2
No. 6 Western Illinois ^	5	–	2	9	–	4
No. 7 Western Kentucky ^	5	–	2	9	–	4
Illinois State	3	–	4	6	–	6
Youngstown State	2	–	5	5	–	7
Southwest Missouri State	1	–	6	4	–	7
Indiana State	0	–	7	3	–	9
+ – Conference co-champions; ^ – NCAA Division I-AA playoff participant; Rankings from The Sports Network poll

2004 Gateway Football Conference standings
	Conf.			Overall
Team	W		L	W		L
No. 9 Southern Illinois $^	7	–	0	10	–	2
No. 11 Western Kentucky ^	6	–	1	9	–	3
No. 25 Northern Iowa	5	–	2	7	–	4
Southwest Missouri State	3	–	4	6	–	5
Western Illinois	2	–	5	4	–	7
Illinois State	2	–	5	4	–	7
Youngstown State	2	–	5	4	–	7
Indiana State	1	–	6	4	–	7
$ – Conference champion; ^ – NCAA Division I-AA playoff participant; Rankings from The Sports Network poll

2005 Gateway Football Conference standings
	Conf.			Overall
Team	W		L	W		L
No. 2 Northern Iowa +^	5	–	2	11	–	4
No. 7 Southern Illinois +^	5	–	2	9	–	4
No. 14 Youngstown State +	5	–	2	8	–	3
No. 22 Illinois State	4	–	3	7	–	4
Western Kentucky	4	–	3	6	–	5
Western Illinois	3	–	4	5	–	6
Missouri State	2	–	5	4	–	6
Indiana State	0	–	7	0	–	11
+ – Conference co-champions; ^ – NCAA Division I-AA playoff participant; Rankings from The Sports Network poll

2006 Gateway Football Conference standings
	Conf.			Overall
Team	W		L	W		L
No. 4 Youngstown State $^	6	–	1	11	–	3
No. 8 Illinois State ^	5	–	2	9	–	4
No. 17 Northern Iowa	5	–	2	7	–	4
No. 7 Southern Illinois ^	4	–	3	9	–	4
Western Kentucky	4	–	3	6	–	5
Western Illinois	2	–	5	5	–	6
Missouri State	1	–	6	2	–	9
Indiana State	1	–	6	1	–	10
$ – Conference champion; ^ – FCS playoff participant; Rankings from The Sports Network poll

2007 Gateway Football Conference standings
	Conf.			Overall
Team	W		L	W		L
No. 4 Northern Iowa $^	6	–	0	12	–	1
No. 3 Southern Illinois ^	5	–	1	12	–	2
No. 16 Youngstown State	3	–	3	7	–	4
Western Illinois	3	–	3	6	–	5
Missouri State	2	–	4	6	–	5
Illinois State	2	–	4	4	–	7
Indiana State	0	–	6	0	–	11
$ – Conference champion; ^ – FCS playoff participant; Rankings from The Sports Network poll

=== Missouri Valley Football Conference ===
2008 Missouri Valley Football Conference standings
	Conf.			Overall
Team	W		L	W		L
No. 4 Northern Iowa +^	7	–	1	12	–	3
No. 11 Southern Illinois +^	7	–	1	9	–	3
South Dakota State	6	–	2	7	–	5
Western Illinois	4	–	4	6	–	5
North Dakota State	4	–	4	6	–	5
Missouri State	3	–	5	4	–	7
Youngstown State	3	–	5	4	–	8
Illinois State	2	–	6	3	–	8
Indiana State	0	–	8	0	–	12
+ – Conference co-champions; ^ – FCS playoff participant; Rankings from The Sports Network poll

2009 Missouri Valley Football Conference standings
	Conf.			Overall
Team	W		L	W		L
No. 6 Southern Illinois $^	8	–	0	11	–	2
No. 11 South Dakota State ^	7	–	1	8	–	3
No. 18 Northern Iowa	5	–	3	7	–	4
Illinois State	5	–	3	6	–	5
Missouri State	4	–	4	6	–	5
Youngstown State	4	–	4	6	–	5
North Dakota State	2	–	6	3	–	8
Indiana State	1	–	7	1	–	10
Western Illinois	0	–	8	1	–	10
$ – Conference champion; ^ – FCS playoff participant; Rankings from The Sports Network poll

2010 Missouri Valley Football Conference standings
	Conf.			Overall
Team	W		L	W		L
No. 19 Northern Iowa $^	6	–	2	7	–	5
No. 17 Western Illinois ^	5	–	3	8	–	5
No. 9 North Dakota State ^	4	–	4	9	–	5
Indiana State	4	–	4	6	–	5
Illinois State	4	–	4	6	–	5
South Dakota State	4	–	4	5	–	6
Missouri State	4	–	4	5	–	6
Southern Illinois	4	–	4	5	–	6
Youngstown State	1	–	7	3	–	8
$ – Conference champion; ^ – FCS playoff participant; Rankings from The Sports Network poll

2011 Missouri Valley Football Conference standings
	Conf.			Overall
Team	W		L	W		L
No. 1 North Dakota State +^	7	–	1	14	–	1
No. 6 Northern Iowa +^	7	–	1	10	–	3
No. 20 Illinois State	5	–	3	7	–	4
Indiana State	4	–	4	6	–	5
Youngstown State	4	–	4	6	–	5
South Dakota State	4	–	4	5	–	6
Southern Illinois	2	–	6	4	–	7
Missouri State	2	–	6	2	–	9
Western Illinois	1	–	7	2	–	9
+ – Conference co-champions; ^ – FCS playoff participant; Rankings from The Sports Network poll

2012 Missouri Valley Football Conference standings
	Conf.			Overall
Team	W		L	W		L
No. 1 North Dakota State $^	7	–	1	14	–	1
No. 14 South Dakota State ^	6	–	2	9	–	4
No. 8 Illinois State ^	5	–	3	9	–	4
Indiana State	5	–	3	7	–	4
Southern Illinois	5	–	3	6	–	5
Youngstown State	4	–	4	7	–	4
Northern Iowa	4	–	4	5	–	6
Missouri State	3	–	5	3	–	8
Western Illinois	1	–	7	3	–	8
South Dakota	0	–	8	1	–	10
$ – Conference champion; ^ – FCS playoff participant; Rankings from The Sports Network poll

2013 Missouri Valley Football Conference standings
	Conf.			Overall
Team	W		L	W		L
No. 1 North Dakota State $^	8	–	0	15	–	0
No. 13 South Dakota State ^	5	–	3	9	–	5
No. 18 Youngstown State	5	–	3	8	–	4
Southern Illinois	5	–	3	7	–	5
Missouri State	5	–	3	5	–	7
Illinois State	4	–	4	5	–	6
South Dakota	3	–	5	4	–	8
Northern Iowa	3	–	5	7	–	5
Western Illinois	2	–	6	4	–	8
Indiana State	0	–	8	1	–	11
$ – Conference champion; ^ – FCS playoff participant; Rankings from The Sports Network poll

2014 Missouri Valley Football Conference standings
	Conf.			Overall
Team	W		L	W		L
No. 1 North Dakota State +^	7	–	1	15	–	1
No. 2 Illinois State +^	7	–	1	13	–	2
No. 10 Northern Iowa ^	6	–	2	9	–	5
No. 12 South Dakota St. ^	5	–	3	9	–	5
No. 19 Indiana State ^	4	–	4	8	–	6
No. 22 Youngstown State	4	–	4	7	–	5
Southern Illinois	3	–	5	6	–	6
Western Illinois	3	–	5	5	–	7
Missouri State	1	–	7	4	–	8
South Dakota	0	–	8	2	–	10
+ – Conference co-champions; ^ – FCS playoff participant; Rankings from The Sports Network poll

2015 Missouri Valley Football Conference standings
	Conf.			Overall
Team	W		L	W		L
No. 1 North Dakota State +^	7	–	1	13	–	2
No. 5 Illinois State +^	7	–	1	10	–	3
No. 8 Northern Iowa ^	5	–	3	9	–	5
No. 15 South Dakota State ^	5	–	3	8	–	4
Western Illinois ^	5	–	3	7	–	6
Indiana State	3	–	5	5	–	6
Youngstown State	3	–	5	5	–	6
South Dakota	3	–	5	5	–	6
Southern Illinois	2	–	6	3	–	8
Missouri State	0	–	8	1	–	10
+ – Conference co-champions; ^ – FCS playoff participant; Rankings from STATS Poll

2016 Missouri Valley Football Conference standings
	Conf.			Overall
Team	W		L	W		L
No. 3 North Dakota State +^	7	–	1	12	–	2
No. 6 South Dakota State +^	7	–	1	9	–	4
No. 2 Youngstown State ^	6	–	2	12	–	4
Illinois State ^	4	–	4	6	–	6
Northern Iowa	4	–	4	5	–	6
Western Illinois	3	–	5	6	–	5
South Dakota	3	–	5	4	–	7
Indiana State	2	–	6	4	–	7
Missouri State	2	–	6	4	–	7
Southern Illinois	2	–	6	4	–	7
+ – Conference co-champions; ^ – FCS playoff participant; Rankings from STATS Poll

2017 Missouri Valley Football Conference standings
	Conf.			Overall
Team	W		L	W		L
No. 1 North Dakota State $^	7	–	1	14	–	1
No. 3 South Dakota State ^	6	–	2	11	–	3
No. 19 Northern Iowa ^	6	–	2	8	–	5
No. 13 Western Illinois ^	5	–	3	8	–	4
No. 15 South Dakota ^	4	–	4	8	–	5
Illinois State	4	–	4	6	–	5
Youngstown State	4	–	4	6	–	5
Southern Illinois	2	–	6	4	–	7
Missouri State	2	–	6	3	–	8
Indiana State	0	–	8	0	–	11
$ – Conference champion; ^ – FCS playoff participant; Rankings from STATS Poll

2018 Missouri Valley Football Conference standings
	Conf.			Overall
Team	W		L	W		L
No. 1 North Dakota State $^	8	–	0	15	–	0
No. 3 South Dakota State ^	6	–	2	10	–	3
No. 23 Northern Iowa ^	5	–	3	7	–	6
Indiana State	5	–	3	7	–	4
Western Illinois	4	–	4	5	–	6
Illinois State	3	–	5	6	–	5
Youngstown State	3	–	5	4	–	7
South Dakota	3	–	5	4	–	7
Missouri State	2	–	6	4	–	7
Southern Illinois	1	–	7	2	–	9
$ – Conference champion; ^ – FCS playoff participant; Rankings from STATS Poll

2019 Missouri Valley Football Conference standings
	Conf.			Overall
Team	W		L	W		L
No. 1 North Dakota State $^	8	–	0	16	–	0
No. 5 Northern Iowa ^	6	–	2	10	–	5
No. 7 Illinois State ^	5	–	3	10	–	5
No. 10 South Dakota State ^	5	–	3	8	–	5
Southern Illinois	5	–	3	7	–	5
South Dakota	4	–	4	5	–	7
Indiana State	3	–	5	5	–	7
Youngstown State	2	–	6	6	–	6
Missouri State	1	–	7	1	–	10
Western Illinois	1	–	7	1	–	11
$ – Conference champion; ^ – FCS playoff participant; Rankings from STATS Poll

2020 Missouri Valley Football Conference standings
	Conf.			Overall
Team	W		L	W		L
No. 2 South Dakota State +^	5	–	1	8	–	2
No. 12 Missouri State +^	5	–	1	5	–	5
No. 7 North Dakota ^	4	–	1	5	–	2
No. 6 North Dakota State ^	5	–	2	7	–	3
No. 14 Southern Illinois ^	3	–	3	6	–	4
Northern Iowa	3	–	4	3	–	4
South Dakota	1	–	3	1	–	3
Illinois State†	1	–	3	1	–	3
Western Illinois†	1	–	5	1	–	5
Youngstown State	1	–	6	1	–	6
+ – Conference co-champions; ^ – FCS playoff participant; Note: Indiana State opted out of the spring season. † – Illinois State and Western Illinois opted out of the remainder of the spring season on March 21 and April 5, 2021, respectively.; Rankings from STATS Poll

2021 Missouri Valley Football Conference standings
	Conf.			Overall
Team	W		L	W		L
No. 1 North Dakota State $^	7	–	1	14	–	1
No. 14 Missouri State ^	6	–	2	8	–	4
No. 16 Southern Illinois ^	5	–	3	8	–	5
No. 18 South Dakota ^	5	–	3	7	–	5
No. 4 South Dakota State ^	5	–	3	11	–	4
No. 23 Northern Iowa ^	4	–	4	6	–	6
Indiana State	3	–	5	5	–	6
North Dakota	3	–	5	5	–	6
Western Illinois	2	–	6	2	–	9
Illinois State	2	–	6	4	–	7
Youngstown State	2	–	6	3	–	7
$ – Conference champion; ^ – FCS playoff participant; Rankings from STATS Poll

2022 Missouri Valley Football Conference standings
	Conf.			Overall
Team	W		L	W		L
No. 1 South Dakota State $^	8	–	0	14	–	1
No. 2 North Dakota State ^	7	–	1	12	–	3
No. 20 North Dakota ^	5	–	3	7	–	5
Youngstown State	5	–	3	7	–	4
Northern Iowa	5	–	3	6	–	5
Illinois State	4	–	4	6	–	5
Southern Illinois	4	–	4	5	–	6
Missouri State	3	–	5	5	–	6
South Dakota	2	–	6	3	–	8
Indiana State	1	–	7	2	–	9
Western Illinois	0	–	8	0	–	11
$ – Conference champion; ^ – FCS playoff participant; Rankings from STATS Poll

2023 Missouri Valley Football Conference standings
	Conf.			Overall
Team	W		L	W		L
No. 1 South Dakota State $^	8	–	0	15	–	0
No. 4 South Dakota ^	7	–	1	10	–	3
No. 3 North Dakota State ^	5	–	3	11	–	4
No. 19 Youngstown State ^	5	–	3	8	–	5
No. 16 North Dakota ^	5	–	3	7	–	5
Northern Iowa	5	–	3	6	–	5
No. 12 Southern Illinois ^	4	–	4	8	–	5
Illinois State	4	–	4	6	–	5
Missouri State	3	–	5	4	–	7
Murray State	1	–	7	2	–	9
Indiana State	1	–	7	1	–	10
Western Illinois	0	–	8	0	–	11
$ – Conference champion; ^ – FCS playoff participant; Rankings from STATS Poll

2024 Missouri Valley Football Conference standings
	Conf.			Overall
Team	W		L	W		L
No. 1 North Dakota State +^	7	–	1	14	–	2
No. 3 South Dakota State +^	7	–	1	12	–	3
No. 4 South Dakota +^	7	–	1	11	–	3
Missouri State *	6	–	2	8	–	4
No. 11 Illinois State ^	6	–	2	10	–	4
Youngstown State	3	–	5	4	–	8
Indiana State	3	–	5	4	–	8
North Dakota	2	–	6	5	–	7
Southern Illinois	2	–	6	4	–	8
Northern Iowa	1	–	7	3	–	9
Murray State	0	–	8	1	–	11
+ – Conference co-champions; ^ – FCS playoff participant; * – Ineligible for 2024 FCS playoffs due to transition to the FBS; Rankings from STATS Poll

2025 Missouri Valley Football Conference standings
	Conf.			Overall
Team	W		L	W		L
No. 4т North Dakota State $^	8	–	0	12	–	1
No. 9 South Dakota ^	6	–	2	10	–	5
No. 2 Illinois State ^	5	–	3	12	–	5
No. 14 North Dakota ^	5	–	3	8	–	6
No. 18 Youngstown State ^	5	–	3	8	–	5
No. 13 South Dakota State ^	4	–	4	9	–	5
No. 25 Southern Illinois	4	–	4	7	–	5
Northern Iowa	1	–	7	3	–	9
Murray State	1	–	7	1	–	11
Indiana State	1	–	7	3	–	9
$ – Conference champion; ^ – FCS playoff participant; Rankings from STATS Poll
