= List of Illinois State Redbirds in the NFL draft =

This is a list of Illinois State Redbirds football players in the NFL draft.

== Key ==
B	Back	K	Kicker	NT	Nose tackle
C	Center	LB	Linebacker	FB	Fullback
DB	Defensive back	P	Punter	HB	Halfback
DE	Defensive end	QB	Quarterback	WR	Wide receiver
DT	Defensive tackle	RB	Running back	G	Guard
E	End	T	Offensive tackle	TE	Tight end

== Selections ==
Year	Round	Pick	Player	Team	Position	Notes
1944	6	45	Bruce McDonald	Brooklyn Dodgers	E	
1944	22	220	Jack Esorcia	Chicago Cardinals	B	
1970	15	385	Guy Homoly	Cleveland Browns	DB	
1973	6	140	Ron Bell	Pittsburgh Steelers	RB	
1976	6	172	Calvin Harper	Kansas City Chiefs	T	
1978	3	62	Estus Hood	Green Bay Packers	DB	
1984	3	62	Clarence Collins	San Diego Chargers	WR	
1985	7	176	Mike Prior	Tampa Bay Buccaneers	DB	
1986	7	167	Jim Meyer	Cleveland Browns	T	
1990	10	258	Bill Miller	Detroit Lions	WR	
2005	5	138	Boomer Grigsby	Kansas City Chiefs	LB	
2006	5	160	Brent Hawkins	Jacksonville Jaguars	DE	
2007	3	75	Laurent Robinson	Atlanta Falcons	WR	
2013	6	193	Nate Palmer	Green Bay Packers	LB	
2014	7	235	Shelby Harris	Oakland Raiders	DE	
2015	5	173	James O'Shaughnessy	Kansas City Chiefs	TE	
2018	5	151	Davontae Harris	Cincinnati Bengals	DB	

== Notable undrafted players ==
Note: No drafts held before 1936

Debut year	Player	Debut NFL/AFL team	Position	Notes
1943	Joe Vodicka	Chicago Bears	HB	—
1973	Joe Washington	Atlanta Falcons	RB	—
1980	Jeff George	New Orleans Saints	DB	—
1981	Bill Fenn	Seattle Seahawks	FB	—
1984	Mark Rodenhauser	Chicago Bears	C	—
1986	Creig Federico	Kansas City Chiefs	DB	—
1987	Brian Gant	Tampa Bay Buccaneers	LB	—
1988	Jason Johnson	Denver Broncos	WR	—
1989	Peter Shorts	New England Patriots	DT/OT	—
1997	Duane Butler	Minnesota Vikings	LB/DB	—
1998	Larry Fitzpatrick	Baltimore Ravens	DL	—
2000	Damian Gregory	Miami Dolphins	DE	—
2001	Aveion Cason	St. Louis Rams	RB	—
2002	Andy King	St. Louis Rams	OG	—
2007	Cameron Siskowic	Cincinnati Bengals	LB	—
2008	Luke Drone	Buffalo Bills	QB	—
2008	Brandon Joyce	Minnesota Vikings	OT	—
2009	Walter Mendenhall	Philadelphia Eagles	RB	—
2009	Tom Nelson	Cincinnati Bengals	S	—
2012	Cody White	Houston Texans	G	—
2014	Colton Underwood	San Diego Chargers	DE	—
2015	Michael Liedtke	Miami Dolphins	OG	—
2015	Cameron Meredith	Chicago Bears	WR	—
2016	Tre Roberson	Minnesota Vikings	DB	—
2017	B. J. Bello	Cleveland Browns	LB	—
2017	Cameron Lee	New Orleans Saints	OG	—
2019	Spencer Schnell	Tampa Bay Buccaneers	WR	—
2020	Luther Kirk	Dallas Cowboys	S	—
2020	James Robinson	Jacksonville Jaguars	RB	—
2021	Romeo McKnight	Cleveland Browns	DE	—
2023	Zeke Vandenburgh	Miami Dolphins	LB	–
2024	Zack Annexstad	Tampa Bay Buccaneers	QB	–
2025	Keondre Jackson	Baltimore Ravens	S	–
