= 2012 Illinois State Redbirds football team =

American college football season

2012 Illinois State Redbirds football

NCAA Division I Quarterfinal, L 35–51 vs. Eastern Washington
- Conference: Missouri Valley Football Conference

Ranking
- Sports Network: No. 8
- FCS Coaches: No. 9
- Record: 9–4 (5–3 MVFC)
- Head coach: Brock Spack (4th season)
- Offensive coordinator: Luke Huard (3rd season)
- Defensive coordinator: Brock Spack (1st season)
- MVPs: Matt Brown; Colton Underwood
- Captains: Matt Brown; Nate Palmer
- Home stadium: Hancock Stadium

2012 Missouri Valley Football Conference standings
	Conf.			Overall
Team	W		L	W		L
No. 1 North Dakota State $^	7	–	1	14	–	1
No. 14 South Dakota State ^	6	–	2	9	–	4
No. 8 Illinois State ^	5	–	3	9	–	4
Indiana State	5	–	3	7	–	4
Southern Illinois	5	–	3	6	–	5
Youngstown State	4	–	4	7	–	4
Northern Iowa	4	–	4	5	–	6
Missouri State	3	–	5	3	–	8
Western Illinois	1	–	7	3	–	8
South Dakota	0	–	8	1	–	10
$ – Conference champion; ^ – FCS playoff participant; Rankings from The Sports Network poll

The 2012 Illinois State Redbirds football team represented Illinois State University as a member of the Missouri Valley Football Conference (MVFC) during the 2012 NCAA Division I FCS football season. Led by fourth-year head coach Brock Spack, the Redbirds compiled an overall record of 9–4 with a mark of 5–3 in conference play, placing in a three-way tie for third in the MVFC. Illinois State received an at-large bid to the NCAA Division I Football Championship playoffs. After a first-round bye, the Redbirds defeated Appalachian State in the second round before falling to Eastern Washington in the quarterfinals. The team played home games at Hancock Stadium in Normal, Illinois.

Illinois State averaged 6,511 fans per home game in 2012 while the East Side of Hancock Stadium was being renovated. Two games were sold out, against Eastern Illinois and Southern Illinois.

== Schedule ==
Date	Time	Opponent	Rank	Site	TV	Result	Attendance	Source
September 1	12:00 pm	Dayton*	No. 19	Hancock Stadium; Normal, IL		W 56–14	4,840	
September 8	1:00 pm	at Eastern Michigan*	No. 18	Rynearson Stadium; Ypsilanti, MI	CSNC	W 31–14	7,654	
September 15	1:00 pm	Eastern Illinois*	No. 15	Hancock Stadium; Normal, IL (Mid-America Classic)		W 54–51 ^{2OT}	7,700	
September 22	3:00 pm	at Western Illinois	No. 15	Hanson Field; Macomb, IL	CSNC	W 23–3	16,033	
September 29	2:00 pm	at South Dakota	No. 13	DakotaDome; Vermillion, SD		W 34–31	7,863	
October 6	1:00 pm	Southern Illinois	No. 9	Hancock Stadium; Normal, IL	CSNC	L 0–17	8,000	
October 13	1:00 pm	No. 8 Youngstown State	No. 14	Hancock Stadium; Normal, IL	CSNC	W 35–28	5,557	
October 20	1:00 pm	Missouri State	No. 11	Hancock Stadium; Normal, IL		L 17–24	6,180	
October 27	4:00 pm	at Northern Iowa	No. 17	UNI-Dome; Cedar Falls, IA	CSNC	W 33–21	9,946	
November 3	1:00 pm	at No. 14 Indiana State	No. 17	Memorial Stadium; Terre Haute, IN	CSNC	W 17–10	6,008	
November 17	1:00 pm	No. 1 North Dakota State	No. 11	Hancock Stadium; Normal, IL	ESPN3	L 20–38	6,793	
December 1	1:00 pm	at No. 7 Appalachian State*	No. 16	Kidd Brewer Stadium; Boone, NC (NCAA Division I Second Round)	ESPN3	W 38–37 ^{OT}	16,719	
December 8	5:00 pm	at No. 4 Eastern Washington*	No. 16	Roos Field; Cheney, WA (NCAA Division I Quarterfinal)	ESPN3	L 35–51	7,512	
*Non-conference game; Rankings from The Sports Network Poll released prior to the game; All times are in Central time

== Ranking movements ==
Ranking movements Legend: ██ Increase in ranking ██ Decrease in ranking
	Week													
Poll	Pre	1	2	3	4	5	6	7	8	9	10	11	12	Final
Sports Network	19	18	15	15	13	9	14	11	17	17	15	11	16	8
Coaches	20	19	17	15	12	11	16	13	17	15	15	11	15	9

== Players drafted in the NFL ==
Draft year	Player	Position	Round	Overall	NFL team
2013	Nate Palmer	LB	6	193	Green Bay Packers
