= 2007 Western Illinois Leathernecks football team =

American college football season

2007 Western Illinois Leathernecks football
- Conference: Gateway Football Conference
- Record: 6–5 (3–3 Gateway)
- Head coach: Don Patterson (9th season)
- Offensive coordinator: Mark Hendrickson (9th season)
- Defensive coordinator: Thomas Casey (3rd season)
- Home stadium: Hanson Field

2007 Gateway Football Conference standings
	Conf.			Overall
Team	W		L	W		L
No. 4 Northern Iowa $^	6	–	0	12	–	1
No. 3 Southern Illinois ^	5	–	1	12	–	2
No. 16 Youngstown State	3	–	3	7	–	4
Western Illinois	3	–	3	6	–	5
Missouri State	2	–	4	6	–	5
Illinois State	2	–	4	4	–	7
Indiana State	0	–	6	0	–	11
$ – Conference champion; ^ – FCS playoff participant; Rankings from The Sports Network poll

The 2007 Western Illinois Leathernecks football team represented Western Illinois University as a member of the Gateway Football Conference during the 2007 NCAA Division I FCS football season. They were led by ninth-year head coach Don Patterson and played their home games at Hanson Field in Macomb, Illinois. The Leathernecks finished the season with a 6–5 record overall and a 3–3 record in conference play, tying for third place in the Gateway.

== Schedule ==
Date	Time	Opponent	Rank	Site	TV	Result	Attendance	Source
August 30		No. 20 South Dakota State*		Hanson Field; Macomb, IL		W 29–26 ^{4OT}	11,648	
September 8	6:00 p.m.	at Illinois*	No. 24	Memorial Stadium; Champaign, IL	BTN	L 0–21	48,301	
September 15		St. Francis (IL)*	No. 22	Hanson Field; Macomb, IL		W 69–0	10,820	
September 22	6:00 p.m.	at Stephen F. Austin*	No. 19	Homer Bryce Stadium; Nacogdoches, TX		W 34–13	10,653	
September 29	1:05 p.m.	No. 4 North Dakota State*	No. 17	Hanson Field; Macomb, IL		L 28–41	15,619	
October 6		at Indiana State	No. 22	Memorial Stadium; Terre Haute, IN		W 19–7	2,411	
October 13		Missouri State	No. 19	Hanson Field; Macomb, IL		W 31–10	10,011	
October 20	6:35 p.m.	No. 1 Northern Iowa	No. 17	Hanson Field; Macomb, IL	FSNM/FCS/MS-KC/CFU	L 3–42	15,330	
October 27		at Illinois State	No. 24	Hancock Stadium; Normal, IL		W 27–14	15,118	
November 3		No. 6 Southern Illinois	No. 19	Hanson Field; Macomb, IL		L 9–10	12,112	
November 10		at No. 21 Youngstown State	No. 23	Stambaugh Stadium; Youngstown, OH		L 24–31	13,110	
*Non-conference game; Rankings from The Sports Network Poll released prior to the game; All times are in Central time
