= 2006 Illinois State Redbirds football team =

American college football season

2006 Illinois State Redbirds football

NCAA Division I Quarterfinal, L 21–28 vs. Youngstown State
- Conference: Gateway Football Conference

Ranking
- Sports Network: No. 8
- Record: 9–4 (5–2 Gateway)
- Head coach: Denver Johnson (7th season)
- Offensive coordinator: Justin Fuente (3rd season)
- MVPs: Pierre Rembert; Cameron Siskowic
- Captain: Game captains
- Home stadium: Hancock Stadium

2006 Gateway Football Conference standings
	Conf.			Overall
Team	W		L	W		L
No. 4 Youngstown State $^	6	–	1	11	–	3
No. 8 Illinois State ^	5	–	2	9	–	4
No. 17 Northern Iowa	5	–	2	7	–	4
No. 7 Southern Illinois ^	4	–	3	9	–	4
Western Kentucky	4	–	3	6	–	5
Western Illinois	2	–	5	5	–	6
Missouri State	1	–	6	2	–	9
Indiana State	1	–	6	1	–	10
$ – Conference champion; ^ – FCS playoff participant; Rankings from The Sports Network poll

The 2006 Illinois State Redbirds football team represented Illinois State University as a member of the Gateway Football Conference during the 2006 NCAA Division I FCS football season. Led by seventh-year head coach Denver Johnson, the Redbirds compiled an overall record of 9–4 with a mark of 5–2 in conference play, tying for second place in the Gateway. Illinois State received an at-large bid to the NCAA Division I Football Championship playoffs, defeating Eastern Illinois in the first round before losing to Youngstown State in the quarterfinals. The team was ranked No 8 in The Sports Network's postseason NCAA Division I FCS rankings. Illinois State played home games at Hancock Stadium in Normal, Illinois.

== Schedule ==
Date	Time	Opponent	Rank	Site	TV	Result	Attendance	Source
September 2	6:10 p.m.	at Kansas State*	No. 9	Bill Snyder Family Football Stadium; Manhattan, KS		L 23–24	47,250	
September 9	6:30 p.m.	Central Arkansas*	No. 7	Hancock Stadium; Normal, IL		W 18–3	10,262	
September 16		No. 18 Eastern Illinois*	No. 7	Hancock Stadium; Normal, IL (rivalry)		W 44–30	12,512	
September 23		at Murray State*	No. 6	Roy Stewart Stadium; Murray, KY		W 35–14	4,075	
October 7		at Western Kentucky	No. 6	Houchens Industries–L. T. Smith Stadium; Bowling Green, KY		W 28–27	7,661	
October 14		No. 7 Southern Illinois^{†}	No. 5	Hancock Stadium; Normal, IL		W 37–10	17,237	
October 21		at Western Illinois	No. 3	Hanson Field; Macomb, IL		W 27–14	9,220	
October 28		No. 10 Youngstown State	No. 3	Hancock Stadium; Normal, IL		L 13–27	15,372	
November 4		Missouri State	No. 8	Hancock Stadium; Normal, IL		W 38–14	8,638	
November 11		at Indiana State	No. 7	Memorial Stadium; Terre Haute, IN		W 42–20	2,341	
November 18	4:35 p.m.	at No. 20 Northern Iowa	No. 6	UNI-Dome; Cedar Falls, IA	KFXA/KDSM	L 27–38	10,827	
November 25		at No. 14 Eastern Illinois*	No. 11	O'Brien Field; Charleston, IL (NCAA Division I First Round)		W 24–13	4,400	
December 2		at No. 4 Youngstown State	No. 11	Stambaugh Stadium; Youngstown, OH (NCAA Division I Quarterfinal)		L 21–28	10,813	
*Non-conference game; ^{†}Homecoming; Rankings from The Sports Network Poll released prior to the game; All times are in Central time
