= 2006 Northern Iowa Panthers football team =

American college football season

2006 Northern Iowa Panthers football
- Conference: Gateway Football Conference

Ranking
- Sports Network: No. 17
- Record: 7–4 (5–2 Gateway)
- Head coach: Mark Farley (6th season)
- Co-offensive coordinators: Bill Salmon (6th season); Mario Verduzco (1st season)
- Home stadium: UNI-Dome

2006 Gateway Football Conference standings
	Conf.			Overall
Team	W		L	W		L
No. 4 Youngstown State $^	6	–	1	11	–	3
No. 8 Illinois State ^	5	–	2	9	–	4
No. 17 Northern Iowa	5	–	2	7	–	4
No. 7 Southern Illinois ^	4	–	3	9	–	4
Western Kentucky	4	–	3	6	–	5
Western Illinois	2	–	5	5	–	6
Missouri State	1	–	6	2	–	9
Indiana State	1	–	6	1	–	10
$ – Conference champion; ^ – FCS playoff participant; Rankings from The Sports Network poll

The 2006 Northern Iowa Panthers football team represented the University of Northern Iowa as a member of the Gateway Football Conference during the 2006 NCAA Division I FCS football season. Led by sixth-year head coach Mark Farley, the Panthers compiled an overall record of 7–4 with a mark of 5–2 in conference play, tying for second place in the Gateway. The team played home games at the UNI-Dome in Cedar Falls, Iowa.

== Schedule ==
Date	Time	Opponent	Rank	Site	TV	Result	Attendance	Source
August 31	7:05 pm	at Drake*	No. 4	Drake Stadium; Des Moines, IA (Scheels Kickoff Classic, rivalry)	KFXA, KDSM	W 48–7	10,107	
September 9	4:05 pm	North Dakota*	No. 3	UNI-Dome; Cedar Falls, IA		L 31–35	11,010	
September 16	4:05 pm	South Dakota State*	No. 12	UNI-Dome; Cedar Falls, IA		W 27–17	11,227	
September 30	6:00 pm	at Iowa State*	No. 13	Jack Trice Stadium; Ames, IA		L 27–28	55,518	
October 7	4:05 pm	Missouri State^{†}	No. 14	UNI-Dome; Cedar Falls, IA	Mediacom	W 38–7	13,843	
October 14	3:35 pm	at Indiana State	No. 14	Memorial Stadium; Terre Haute, IN		W 34–14	2,376	
October 21	3:00 pm	at No. 5 Youngstown State	No. 14	Stambaugh Stadium; Youngstown, OH	KFXA, KDSM, FCS	W 31–23	19,321	
October 28	4:05 pm	Western Illinois	No. 7	UNI-Dome; Cedar Falls, IA	CFU	L 13–24	11,058	
November 4	4:05 pm	Western Kentucky	No. 14	UNI-Dome; Cedar Falls, IA		W 31–20	8,756	
November 11	3:00 pm	at No. 14 Southern Illinois	No. 12	McAndrew Stadium; Carbondale, IL		L 23–47	7,422	
November 18	4:35 pm	No. 6 Illinois State	No. 20	UNI-Dome; Cedar Falls, IA	KFXA, KDSM	W 38–27	10,827	
*Non-conference game; ^{†}Homecoming; Rankings from The Sports Network Poll released prior to the game; All times are in Central time

== Coaching staff ==
Name	Position	Year at Northern Iowa	Alma mater (year)
Mark Farley	Head coach	6th	Northern Iowa (1987)
Rick Nelson	Recruiting coordinator Offensive line	7th	Northern Iowa (1984)
Bill Salmon	Associate head coach Offensive coordinator Receivers	6th	Northern Iowa (1980)
Mario Verduzco	Co-offensive coordinator Quarterbacks	6th	San José State (1988)
Atif Austin	Running backs	2nd	Iowa State (2003)
Chris Klieman	Secondary	1st	Northern Iowa (1990)
Jerry Montgomery	Graduate assistant Defensive tackles	1st	Iowa (2002)
Keith Harms	Defensive assistant	3rd	Buena Vista (1979)
Erik Chinander	Tight ends	3rd	Iowa (2003)
