= 2006 Missouri State Bears football team =

American college football season

2006 Missouri State Bears football
- Conference: Gateway Football Conference
- Record: 2–9 (1–6 GFC)
- Head coach: Terry Allen (1st season)
- Offensive coordinator: Rob Christophel (1st season)
- Defensive coordinator: D. J. Vokolek (1st season)
- Captains: Jason Anthony; Derrick Byrd; Steve Kohenskey; Justin Williamson
- Home stadium: Plaster Sports Complex

2006 Gateway Football Conference standings
	Conf.			Overall
Team	W		L	W		L
No. 4 Youngstown State $^	6	–	1	11	–	3
No. 8 Illinois State ^	5	–	2	9	–	4
No. 17 Northern Iowa	5	–	2	7	–	4
No. 7 Southern Illinois ^	4	–	3	9	–	4
Western Kentucky	4	–	3	6	–	5
Western Illinois	2	–	5	5	–	6
Missouri State	1	–	6	2	–	9
Indiana State	1	–	6	1	–	10
$ – Conference champion; ^ – FCS playoff participant; Rankings from The Sports Network poll

The 2006 Missouri State Bears football team represented Missouri State University as a member of the Gateway Football Conference (GFC) during the 2006 NCAA Division I FCS football season. Led by first-year head coach Terry Allen, the Bears compiled an overall record of 2–9, with a mark of 1–6 in conference play, and finished tied for seventh in the GFC.

== Schedule ==
Date	Opponent	Site	Result	Attendance	Source
September 2	at Oklahoma State*	Boone Pickens Stadium; Stillwater, OK	L 10–52	41,393	
September 9	Southwest Baptist*	Plaster Sports Complex; Springfield, MO	W 45–14	11,615	
September 16	at Central Arkansas*	Estes Stadium; Conway, AR	L 14–16	11,215	
September 23	Sam Houston State*	Plaster Sports Complex; Springfield, MO	L 17–20	10,490	
September 30	No. 8 Youngstown State	Plaster Sports Complex; Springfield, MO	L 10–37		
October 7	at No. 14 Northern Iowa	UNI-Dome; Cedar Falls, IA	L 7–38	13,843	
October 14	Western Kentucky	Plaster Sports Complex; Springfield, MO	L 14–17	9,405	
October 21	at Indiana State	Memorial Stadium; Terre Haute, IN	L 22–28	4,727	
October 28	No. 19 Southern Illinois	Plaster Sports Complex; Springfield, MO	L 17–27	10,180	
November 4	at No. 8 Illinois State	Hancock Stadium; Normal, IL	L 14–38	8,638	
November 11	Western Illinois	Plaster Sports Complex; Springfield, MO	W 24–21	6,305	
*Non-conference game; Rankings from The Sports Network Poll released prior to the game
