= Denver Johnson =

American football player and coach (born 1958)

Current position
- Title: Offensive line coach
- Team: Lindenwood
- Conference: OVC

Biographical details
- Born: October 17, 1958 (age 67); Seminole, Oklahoma, U.S.

Playing career
- 1976–1980: Tulsa
- 1981–1982: Tampa Bay Buccaneers
- 1983–1984: Los Angeles Express
- 1985: Houston Gamblers
- Position: Tackle

Coaching career (HC unless noted)
- 1985: Oklahoma State (GA)
- 1986–1988: UT Martin (AHC/OL)
- 1989–1992: Oklahoma State (OL)
- 1993–1995: Mississippi State (OL)
- 1996: Oklahoma (OL)
- 1997–1999: Murray State
- 2000–2008: Illinois State
- 2009–2010: Colorado (OL)
- 2011–2014: Tulsa (OL)
- 2015–2018: Missouri Southern
- 2020–present: Lindenwood (OL)

Head coaching record
- Overall: 72–99
- Tournaments: 1–1 (NCAA D-I-AA playoffs)

Denver Johnson (born October 17, 1958) is an American football coach and former player. Johnson was the head football coach at Murray State University from 1997 to 1999 and at Illinois State University from 2000 to 2008, and Missouri Southern State University from 2015 to 2018 compiling a career college football record of 72–99. Formerly, he was the offensive line coach for the Tulsa Golden Hurricane from 2011 to the end of the 2014 season. Johnson was let go when head coach Bill Blankenship was fired on December 1, 2014. Johnson is currently the Director of High School Relations and Player Development at The University of Tulsa.

== Coaching career ==
Johnson was the 20th head football coach for the Illinois State Redbirds in Normal, Illinois and he held that position for nine seasons, from 2000 until November 22, 2008. Johnson resigned from the program after the Redbirds final game of the 2008 season, a game they lost against Southern Illinois University in overtime, 17–10. His overall coaching record at ISU was 48–54. This ranks him third at ISU in terms of total wins and eighth at ISU in terms of winning percentage.

Prior to coaching at Illinois State, Johnson was the head coach at Murray State University. He was offensive line coach for Colorado in 2009 and 2010, then moved to Tulsa for the 2011 season to join the coaching staff of Bill Blankenship, who had been his college teammate at Tulsa.

On April 1, 2015, Johnson was named the head coach of the Missouri Southern Lions. Johnson resigned from Missouri Southern after three games into the 2018 season to be the full time caretaker for his wife who was suffering with and died away from Early Onset Alzheimer's.

In 2020, Johnson was hired as the offensive line coach for Lindenwood.

In July of 2024 Johnson became the Director of Player Personnel and Development at The University of Tulsa.

== Head coaching record ==
Year	Team	Overall	Conference	Standing	Bowl/playoffs	TSN^{#}
Murray State Racers (Ohio Valley Conference) (1997–1999)
1997	Murray State	7–4	5–2	T–2nd		
1998	Murray State	7–4	5–2	T–2nd		24
1999	Murray State	7–4	5–2	2nd		
Murray State:		21–12	15–6			
Illinois State Redbirds (Missouri Valley Football Conference / Gateway Football Conference) (2000–2008)
2000	Illinois State	7–4	4–2	T–2nd		
2001	Illinois State	2–9	2–5	T–6th		
2002	Illinois State	6–5	4–3	T–3rd		
2003	Illinois State	6–6	3–4	5th		
2004	Illinois State	4–7	2–5	T–5th		
2005	Illinois State	7–4	4–3	T–4th		
2006	Illinois State	9–4	5–2	T–2nd	L NCAA Division I Quarterfinal	8
2007	Illinois State	4–7	2–4	T–5th		
2008	Illinois State	3–8	2–6	8th		
Illinois State:		48–54	28–34			
Missouri Southern Lions (Mid-America Intercollegiate Athletics Association) (2015–2018)
2015	Missouri Southern	1–10	1–10	11th		
2016	Missouri Southern	2–9	2–9	T–10th		
2017	Missouri Southern	0–11	0–11	12th		
2018	Missouri Southern	0–3	0–3	resigned		
Missouri Southern:		3–33	3–33			
Total:		72–99				
