= 2006 Youngstown State Penguins football team =

American college football season

2006 Youngstown State Penguins football

Gateway champion

NCAA Division I Semifinal, L 24–49 vs. Appalachian State
- Conference: Gateway Football Conference

Ranking
- Sports Network: No. 4
- Record: 11–3 (6–1 Gateway)
- Head coach: Jon Heacock (6th season)
- Home stadium: Stambaugh Stadium

2006 Gateway Football Conference standings
	Conf.			Overall
Team	W		L	W		L
No. 4 Youngstown State $^	6	–	1	11	–	3
No. 8 Illinois State ^	5	–	2	9	–	4
No. 17 Northern Iowa	5	–	2	7	–	4
No. 7 Southern Illinois ^	4	–	3	9	–	4
Western Kentucky	4	–	3	6	–	5
Western Illinois	2	–	5	5	–	6
Missouri State	1	–	6	2	–	9
Indiana State	1	–	6	1	–	10
$ – Conference champion; ^ – FCS playoff participant; Rankings from The Sports Network poll

The 2006 Youngstown State Penguins football team represented Youngstown State University in the 2006 NCAA Division I FCS football season. The team was led by sixth-year head coach Jon Heacock and played their home games at Stambaugh Stadium in Youngstown, Ohio. The Penguins finished the season with an 11–3 record overall and a 6–1 mark in Gateway Football Conference play, making them conference champions. They qualified for the NCAA Division I Football Championship playoffs, where they lost to eventual champion Appalachian State in the semifinals. The team was ranked No. 4 in The Sports Network's postseason NCAA Division I FCS poll.

== Schedule ==
Date	Opponent	Rank	Site	Result	Attendance	Source
August 31	Slippery Rock*	No. 7	Stambaugh Stadium; Youngstown, OH	W 51–21	16,645	
September 9	Maine*	No. 8	Stambaugh Stadium; Youngstown, OH	W 34–14	15,867	
September 16	at No. 25 (FBS) Penn State*	No. 6	Beaver Stadium; University Park, PA	L 3–37	104,954	
September 23	No. 16 UC Davis*	No. 8	Stambaugh Stadium; Youngstown, OH	W 38–24	16,155	
September 30	at Missouri State	No. 8	Plaster Sports Complex; Springfield, MO	W 37–10	12,275	
October 7	Indiana State	No. 8	Stambaugh Stadium; Youngstown, OH	W 55–17	16,746	
October 14	at Western Illinois	No. 6	Hanson Field; Macomb, IL	W 35–28	13,522	
October 21	No. 14 Northern Iowa^{†}	No. 5	Stambaugh Stadium; Youngstown, OH	L 23–21	19,321	
October 28	at No. 3 Illinois State	No. 10	Hancock Stadium; Normal, IL	W 27–13	15,372	
November 4	No. 12 Southern Illinois	No. 7	Stambaugh Stadium; Youngstown, OH	W 31–24	14,095	
November 11	at Western Kentucky	No. 6	L. T. Smith Stadium; Bowling Green, KY	W 19–3	7,312	
November 25	No. 6 James Madison*	No. 5	Stambaugh Stadium; Youngstown, OH (NCAA Division I First Round)	W 35–31	11,627	
December 2	No. 11 Illinois State	No. 5	Stambaugh Stadium; Youngstown, OH (NCAA Division I Quarterfinal)	W 28–21	10,813	
December 9	at No. 1 Appalachian State*	No. 5	Kidd Brewer Stadium; Boone, NC (NCAA Division I Semifinal)	L 24–49	18,040	
*Non-conference game; ^{†}Homecoming; Rankings from The Sports Network Poll released prior to the game
