= 2012 Indiana State Sycamores football team =

American college football season

2012 Indiana State Sycamores football
- Conference: Missouri Valley Football Conference
- Record: 7–4 (5–3 MVFC)
- Head coach: Trent Miles (5th season)
- Offensive coordinator: Harold Etheridge (2nd season)
- Defensive coordinator: Jesse Minter (2nd season)
- Home stadium: Memorial Stadium

2012 Missouri Valley Football Conference standings
	Conf.			Overall
Team	W		L	W		L
No. 1 North Dakota State $^	7	–	1	14	–	1
No. 14 South Dakota State ^	6	–	2	9	–	4
No. 8 Illinois State ^	5	–	3	9	–	4
Indiana State	5	–	3	7	–	4
Southern Illinois	5	–	3	6	–	5
Youngstown State	4	–	4	7	–	4
Northern Iowa	4	–	4	5	–	6
Missouri State	3	–	5	3	–	8
Western Illinois	1	–	7	3	–	8
South Dakota	0	–	8	1	–	10
$ – Conference champion; ^ – FCS playoff participant; Rankings from The Sports Network poll

The 2012 Indiana State Sycamores football team represented Indiana State University as a member of the Missouri Valley Football Conference (MVFC) during the 2012 NCAA Division I FCS football season. Led by Trent Miles in his fifth and final season as head coach, the Sycamores compiled an overall record of 7–4 with a mark of 5–3 in conference play, placing in a three-way tie for third in the MVFC. Indiana State played home games at Memorial Stadium in Terre Haute, Indiana.

Miles resigned at the end of the season to take the head coaching job at Georgia State. He was replaced by former UNLV head coach Mike Sanford.

== Schedule ==
Date	Time	Opponent	Rank	Site	TV	Result	Attendance	Source
September 1	8:00 pm	at Indiana*	No. 23	Memorial Stadium; Bloomington, IN	BTN	L 17–24	41,882	
September 8	2:00 pm	Quincy*	No. 23	Memorial Stadium; Terre Haute, IN		W 44–0	6,294	
September 15	2:00 pm	Drake*	No. 22	Memorial Stadium; Terre Haute, IN		W 27–10	7,189	
September 22	2:00 pm	South Dakota State	No. 22	Memorial Stadium; Terre Haute, IN		L 10–24	5,291	
September 29	7:00 pm	at Southern Illinois		Saluki Stadium; Carbondale, IL	ESPN3/MVFCTV	W 24–3	12,166	
October 6	3:00 pm	Missouri State^{†}		Memorial Stadium; Terre Haute, IN		W 31–17	8,311	
October 13	4:00 pm	at No. 1 North Dakota State		Fargodome; Fargo, ND	ESPN3	W 17–14	18,164	
October 20	7:00 pm	at Western Illinois	No. 21	Hanson Field; Macomb, IL		W 23–7	9,478	
October 27	2:00 pm	South Dakota	No. 15	Memorial Stadium; Terre Haute, IN	ESPN3/MVFCTV	W 45–14	5,224	
November 3	2:00 pm	No. 17 Illinois State	No. 14	Memorial Stadium; Terre Haute, IN	CSNC	L 10–17	6,008	
November 17	2:00 pm	at Youngstown State	No. 18	Stambaugh Stadium; Youngstown, OH	ESPN3	L 6–27	9,610	
*Non-conference game; ^{†}Homecoming; Rankings from The Sports Network Poll released prior to the game; All times are in Eastern time

== Rankings ==
Ranking movements Legend: ██ Increase in ranking ██ Decrease in ranking RV = Received votes
	Week																
Poll	Pre	1	2	3	4	5	6	7	8	9	10	11	12	13	14	15	Final
Sports Network	23	23	22	22	RV	RV	RV	21	15	14	18	23					
Coaches	25	RV	RV	25	RV	RV	RV	25	18	17	21						
