= 2006 Western Illinois Leathernecks football team =

American college football season

2006 Western Illinois Leathernecks football
- Conference: Gateway Football Conference
- Record: 5–6 (2–5 Gateway)
- Head coach: Don Patterson (8th season)
- Offensive coordinator: Mark Hendrickson (8th season)
- Defensive coordinator: Thomas Casey (2nd season)
- Home stadium: Hanson Field

2006 Gateway Football Conference standings
	Conf.			Overall
Team	W		L	W		L
No. 4 Youngstown State $^	6	–	1	11	–	3
No. 8 Illinois State ^	5	–	2	9	–	4
No. 17 Northern Iowa	5	–	2	7	–	4
No. 7 Southern Illinois ^	4	–	3	9	–	4
Western Kentucky	4	–	3	6	–	5
Western Illinois	2	–	5	5	–	6
Missouri State	1	–	6	2	–	9
Indiana State	1	–	6	1	–	10
$ – Conference champion; ^ – FCS playoff participant; Rankings from The Sports Network poll

The 2006 Western Illinois Leathernecks football team represented Western Illinois University as a member of the Gateway Football Conference during the 2006 NCAA Division I FCS football season. They were led by eighth-year head coach Don Patterson and played their home games at Hanson Field in Macomb, Illinois. The Leathernecks finished the season with a 5–6 record overall and a 2–5 record in conference play, placing sixth in the Gateway.

== Schedule ==
Date	Time	Opponent	Rank	Site	TV	Result	Attendance	Source
August 31		Morehead State*		Hanson Field; Macomb, IL		W 31–6	11,081	
September 9	2:30 p.m.	at Wisconsin*		Camp Randall Stadium; Madison, WI	ESPNU	L 10–34	80,845	
September 16		Kentucky Wesleyan*		Hanson Field; Macomb, IL		W 58–0	10,112	
September 23		at Northern Colorado*		Nottingham Field; Greeley, CO		W 42–28	6,219	
September 30		at Western Kentucky	No. 21	L. T. Smith Stadium; Bowling Green, KY		L 35–38	11,710	
October 7		at No. 9 Southern Illinois		McAndrew Stadium; Carbondale, IL		L 24–31	13,721	
October 14		No. 6 Youngstown State		Hanson Field; Macomb, IL		L 28–35	13,522	
October 21		No. 3 Illinois State		Hanson Field; Macomb, IL		L 14–27	9,220	
October 28	4:05 p.m.	at No. 7 Northern Iowa		UNI-Dome; Cedar Falls, IA	CFU	W 24–13	11,058	
November 4		Indiana State		Hanson Field; Macomb, IL		W 46–41	9,571	
November 11		at Missouri State		Plaster Sports Complex; Springfield, MO		L 21–24	6,305	
*Non-conference game; Rankings from The Sports Network Poll released prior to the game; All times are in Central time

== Roster ==
2006 Western Illinois Leathernecks football team roster
Players
Coaches
Offense

Pos.	#	Name	Class
RB	3	Herb Donaldson	So
WR	11	Marco Thomas	Sr

Defense

Pos.	#	Name	Class
LB	7	Mike McEachern	So
LB	6	Jason Williams	So

Special teams

Pos.	#	Name	Class
K, P	16	Taylor Rowan	So

Head coach

- Don Patterson

Coordinators/assistant coaches

Legend

- (C) Team captain
- (S) Suspended
- (I) Ineligible
- Injured
- Redshirt
