= 2007 Southern Illinois Salukis football team =

American college football season

2007 Southern Illinois Salukis football

NCAA Division I Semifinal, L 17–20 vs. Delaware
- Conference: Gateway Football Conference

Ranking
- Sports Network: No. 3
- Record: 12–2 (5–1 Gateway)
- Head coach: Jerry Kill (7th season)
- Offensive coordinator: Matt Limegrover (7th season)
- Defensive coordinator: Tracy Claeys (7th season)
- Home stadium: McAndrew Stadium

2007 Gateway Football Conference standings
| | Conf. | | | Overall |
| Team | W | | L | W | | L |
|---|---|---|---|---|---|---|
| No. 4 Northern Iowa $^ | 6 | – | 0 | 12 | – | 1 |
| No. 3 Southern Illinois ^ | 5 | – | 1 | 12 | – | 2 |
| No. 16 Youngstown State | 3 | – | 3 | 7 | – | 4 |
| Western Illinois | 3 | – | 3 | 6 | – | 5 |
| Missouri State | 2 | – | 4 | 6 | – | 5 |
| Illinois State | 2 | – | 4 | 4 | – | 7 |
| Indiana State | 0 | – | 6 | 0 | – | 11 |
$ – Conference champion; ^ – FCS playoff participant; Rankings from The Sports Network poll

The 2007 Southern Illinois Salukis football team represented Southern Illinois University as a member of the Gateway Football Conference during the 2007 NCAA Division I FCS football season. They were led by seventh-year head coach Jerry Kill and played their home games at McAndrew Stadium in Carbondale, Illinois. The Salukis finished the season with a 12–2 record overall and a 5–1 record in conference play. The team received an at-large bid to the FCS playoffs, where they defeated Eastern Illinois and UMass before losing to Delaware in the semifinals. Southern Illinois was ranked No. 3 in The Sports Network's postseason ranking of FCS teams.

== Schedule ==
| Date | Time | Opponent | Rank | Site | TV | Result | Attendance | Source |
|---|---|---|---|---|---|---|---|---|
| August 30 | | Quincy* | No. 12 | McAndrew Stadium; Carbondale, IL | | W 59–14 | 9,589 | |
| September 8 | 6:30 p.m. | at Northern Illinois* | No. 11 | Huskie Stadium; DeKalb, IL | CSNC | W 34–31 | 24,182 | |
| September 15 | | at Southern Utah* | No. 7 | Eccles Coliseum; Cedar City, UT | | W 44–10 | 4,557 | |
| September 22 | | Arkansas–Pine Bluff* | No. 7 | McAndrew Stadium; Carbondale, IL | | W 58–3 | 11,316 | |
| September 29 | | at Indiana State | No. 7 | Memorial Stadium; Terre Haute, IN | | W 72–10 | 2,599 | |
| October 6 | | No. 10 Youngstown State | No. 7 | McAndrew Stadium; Carbondale, IL | | W 24–17 | 13,188 | |
| October 13 | 4:05 p.m. | at No. 2 Northern Iowa | No. 7 | UNI-Dome; Cedar Falls, IA | Mediacom/CFU | L 24–30 | 17,074 | |
| October 20 | | Missouri State | No. 9 | McAndrew Stadium; Carbondale, IL | | W 45–10 | 12,064 | |
| November 3 | | at No. 19 Western Illinois | No. 6 | Hanson Field; Macomb, IL | | W 10–9 | 12,112 | |
| November 10 | | Illinois State | No. 5 | McAndrew Stadium; Carbondale, IL | | W 34–24 | 9,259 | |
| November 17 | | at Hampton* | No. 5 | Armstrong Stadium; Hampton, VA | | W 45–27 | 3,340 | |
| November 24 | | No. 18 Eastern Illinois* | No. 4 | McAndrew Stadium; Carbondale, IL (NCAA Division I First Round) | | W 30–11 | 6,124 | |
| December 1 | 2:15 p.m. | No. 7 UMass* | No. 4 | McAndrew Stadium; Carbondale, IL (NCAA Division I Quarterfinal) | ESPN GamePlan (NESN, MASN, TWCS, Cox Sports) | W 34–27 | 6,560 | |
| December 8 | 3:00 p.m. | No. 13 Delaware* | No. 4 | McAndrew Stadium; Carbondale, IL (NCAA Division I Semifinal) | ESPN | L 17–20 | 11,503 | |
*Non-conference game; Rankings from The Sports Network Poll released prior to the game; All times are in Central time
