= 2012 South Dakota State Jackrabbits football team =

American college football season

2012 South Dakota State Jackrabbits football

NCAA DIvision I Second Round, L 3–28 at North Dakota State
- Conference: Missouri Valley Football Conference

Ranking
- Sports Network: No. 14
- FCS Coaches: No. 17
- Record: 9–4 (6–2 MVFC)
- Head coach: John Stiegelmeier (16th season)
- Offensive coordinator: Eric Eidsness (7th season)
- Co-defensive coordinators: Clint Brown (4th season); Jay Bubak (4th season)
- Home stadium: Coughlin–Alumni Stadium

2012 Missouri Valley Football Conference standings
	Conf.			Overall
Team	W		L	W		L
No. 1 North Dakota State $^	7	–	1	14	–	1
No. 14 South Dakota State ^	6	–	2	9	–	4
No. 8 Illinois State ^	5	–	3	9	–	4
Indiana State	5	–	3	7	–	4
Southern Illinois	5	–	3	6	–	5
Youngstown State	4	–	4	7	–	4
Northern Iowa	4	–	4	5	–	6
Missouri State	3	–	5	3	–	8
Western Illinois	1	–	7	3	–	8
South Dakota	0	–	8	1	–	10
$ – Conference champion; ^ – FCS playoff participant; Rankings from The Sports Network poll

The 2012 South Dakota State Jackrabbits football team represented South Dakota State University as a member of the Missouri Valley Football Conference (MVFC) during the 2012 NCAA Division I FCS football season. Led by 16th-year head coach John Stiegelmeier, the Jackrabbits compiled an overall record of 9–4 with a mark of 6–2 in conference play, placing second in the MVFC. South Dakota State received an at–large bid to the NCAA Division I Football Championship playoffs, where the Jackrabbits defeated Eastern Illinois in the first round before falling to fellow MVFC member and eventual national champion, North Dakota State, in the second round. The team played home games at Coughlin–Alumni Stadium in Brookings, South Dakota.

== Schedule ==
Date	Time	Opponent	Rank	Site	TV	Result	Attendance	Source
September 1	6:00 pm	at Kansas*		Memorial Stadium; Lawrence, KS		L 17–31	46,601	
September 8	7:00 pm	at Southeastern Louisiana*		Strawberry Stadium; Hammond, LA		W 31–14	6,278	
September 15	2:00 pm	UC Davis*		Coughlin–Alumni Stadium; Brookings, SD	Midco Sports Net	W 12–8	11,532	
September 22	2:00 pm	at No. 22 Indiana State		Memorial Stadium; Terre Haute, IN		W 24–10	5,291	
September 29	6:00 pm	Missouri State	No. 25	Coughlin–Alumni Stadium; Brookings, SD	MVFC TV	W 17–7	14,186	
October 13	6:00 pm	Western Illinois	No. 20	Coughlin–Alumni Stadium; Brookings, SD	MVFC TV	W 31–10	10,727	
October 20	4:00 pm	at Northern Iowa	No. 20	UNI-Dome; Cedar Falls, IA	MVFC TV	L 6–27	13,067	
October 27	2:00 pm	No. 22 Youngstown State		Coughlin–Alumni Stadium; Brookings, SD	ESPN3	W 41–28	14,966	
November 3	2:00 pm	at Southern Illinois	No. 21	Plaster Sports Complex; Springfield, MO		W 16–12	7,499	
November 10	3:00 pm	at No. 1 North Dakota State	No. 16	Fargodome; Fargo, ND (Dakota Marker)	FCS	L 17–20	18,721	
November 17	2:00 pm	South Dakota	No. 21	Coughlin–Alumni Stadium; Brookings, SD	Midco Sports Net	W 31–8	15,278	
November 24	2:00 pm	No. 25 Eastern Illinois*	No. 19	Coughlin–Alumni Stadium; Brookings, SD (NCAA Division I First Round)	ESPN3	W 58–10	4,367	
December 1	3:00 pm	at No. 1 North Dakota State*	No. 19	Fargodome; Fargo, ND (NCAA Division I Second Round)	ESPN3	L 3–28	18,482	
*Non-conference game; Rankings from The Sports Network Poll released prior to the game; All times are in Central time
