= Terre Haute Huts =

Defunct Indiana minor league baseball team

The Terre Haute Huts were a minor league professional baseball team in Terre Haute, Indiana in the Three-I League. The team was in existence from 1955 to 1956, and was affiliated with the Detroit Tigers. They played at Indiana State University's Memorial Stadium.

The baseball club chose the Huts name after a name-the-team-contest. Ralph Nichols, a local barber, was the winner. However, the name was also favored by employees of Stran Steel, makers of Quonset Hut buildings, made famous by the U.S. Armed Forces. The name was also favored due to its short name for newspaper headlines.

The club was owned and operated by Paul Frisz, who was known as "Mr. Baseball", in the area. The club struggled at the gate, failing to reach a goal of 1,200 fans a game to break even and ceased operations midway through their second season on July 3, 1956. The team incurred losses of $3,500 during the season, with a total of 21,085 for the team's 27 home dates of the first half of the season. The Huts would be the last professional baseball team to call Terre Haute home.

== Year-by-year record ==
| Year | Record | Finish | Manager | Playoffs |
|---|---|---|---|---|
| 1956 | 40–26 | – | Bill Norman (12–3) / Charlie Metro (28–23) | Team disbanded July 3 |
| 1955 | 56–70 | 6th | Stubby Overmire | |
