= Don Patterson (American football coach) =

American football coach (born 1950)

Biographical details
- Born: December 10, 1950 (age 75); Corsicana, Texas, U.S.
- Education: Army

Coaching career (HC unless noted)
- 1978: North Texas (assistant)
- 1979: Iowa (assistant DB)
- 1980: Iowa (RC)
- 1981–1988: Iowa (TE)
- 1989–1991: Iowa (QB/WR)
- 1992–1997: Iowa (OC/QB/WR)
- 1998: Iowa (OC/WR/TE)
- 1999–2007: Western Illinois
- 2008–2009: Western Illinois
- 2011–2013: Buffalo (QB/RC)
- 2014: Connecticut (associate HC/QB)
- 2015: Connecticut (AHC/TE)

Head coaching record
- Overall: 63–47
- Tournaments: 2–3 (NCAA D-I-AA playoffs)

Accomplishments and honors

Championships
- 2 Gateway (2000, 2002)

Donnie Kent Patterson (born December 10, 1950) is an American former football coach. He served as the head football coach at Western Illinois University in Macomb, Illinois from 1999 to 2009, when he resigned due to health problems related to treatment for cancer. Patterson was the 18th football coach at the school. His record at Western Illinois was 63–47. He spent his final two years of coaching as assistant head coach and quarterbacks coach of the Connecticut Huskies. Patterson announced his retirement on January 8, 2016, after 37 years of college coaching.

== Head coaching record ==
Year	Team	Overall	Conference	Standing	Bowl/playoffs	TSN^{#}
Western Illinois Leathernecks (Gateway Football Conference) (1999–2007)
1999	Western Illinois	7–4	2–4	T–4th		
2000	Western Illinois	9–3	5–1	1st	L NCAA Division I-AA First Round	12
2001	Western Illinois	5–5	4–3	4th		
2002	Western Illinois	11–2	6–1	T–1st	L NCAA Division I-AA Quarterfinal	5
2003	Western Illinois	9–4	5–2	T–3rd	L NCAA Division I-AA Quarterfinal	6
2004	Western Illinois	4–7	2–5	T–5th		
2005	Western Illinois	5–6	3–4	6th		
2006	Western Illinois	5–6	2–5	6th		
2007	Western Illinois	6–5	3–3	T–3rd		
Western Illinois Leathernecks (Gateway Football Conference / Missouri Valley Football Conference) (2008–2009)
2008	Western Illinois	1–3 (Note: Mark Hendrickson served as acting head coach for the first seven games of the 2008 season before Patterson returned as head coach for the final four games. Western Illinois finished the year 6–5 overall with a 4–4 conference mark.)	1–3	T–4th		
2009	Western Illinois	1–2 (Note: Patterson served as head coach for the first three games of the season before resigning. Mark Hendrickson replaced him as acting head coach for the final eight games. Western Illinois finished the year 1–10 overall with a 0–8 conference mark, placing ninth.)	0–0			
Western Illinois:		63–47	33–31			
Total:		63–47				
National championship Conference title Conference division title or championship game berth
^{#}Rankings from final The Sports Network poll.
