= 2012 South Dakota Coyotes football team =

American college football season

2012 South Dakota Coyotes football
- Conference: Missouri Valley Football Conference
- Record: 1–10 (0–8 MVFC)
- Head coach: Joe Glenn (1st season)
- Offensive coordinator: Wesley Beschorner (4th season)
- Offensive scheme: Spread
- Defensive coordinator: Jason Petrino (1st season)
- Base defense: 4–3
- Home stadium: DakotaDome

2012 Missouri Valley Football Conference standings
	Conf.			Overall
Team	W		L	W		L
No. 1 North Dakota State $^	7	–	1	14	–	1
No. 14 South Dakota State ^	6	–	2	9	–	4
No. 8 Illinois State ^	5	–	3	9	–	4
Indiana State	5	–	3	7	–	4
Southern Illinois	5	–	3	6	–	5
Youngstown State	4	–	4	7	–	4
Northern Iowa	4	–	4	5	–	6
Missouri State	3	–	5	3	–	8
Western Illinois	1	–	7	3	–	8
South Dakota	0	–	8	1	–	10
$ – Conference champion; ^ – FCS playoff participant; Rankings from The Sports Network poll

The 2012 South Dakota Coyotes football team represented the University of South Dakota in the 2012 NCAA Division I FCS football season. They were led by first year head coach Joe Glenn and played their home games in the DakotaDome. This was their inaugural season in the Missouri Valley Football Conference. They finished the season 1–10, 0–8 in MVFC play to finish in last place.

== Schedule ==
Date	Time	Opponent	Site	TV	Result	Attendance	Source
September 1	2:30 pm	at No. 11 Montana*	Washington–Grizzly Stadium; Missoula, MT	KDLT	L 24–35	25,126	
September 8	2:30 pm	Colgate*	DakotaDome; Vermillion, SD		W 31–21	8,936	
September 22	2:30 pm	at Northwestern*	Ryan Field; Evanston, IL	BTN	L 7–38	28,641	
September 29	2:00 pm	No. 13 Illinois State	DakotaDome; Vermillion, SD	Midco Sports Net	L 31–34	7,863	
October 6	2:00 pm	Western Illinois	DakotaDome; Vermillion, SD	Midco Sports Net	L 17–24	10,196	
October 13	1:00 pm	at Missouri State	Plaster Sports Complex; Springfield, MO	Mediacom/KDLT	L 24–27	8,001	
October 20	6:00 pm	vs. No. 4 North Dakota State	Howard Wood Field; Sioux Falls, SD	Midco Sports Net	L 0–54	9,269	
October 27	1:00 pm	at No. 15 Indiana State	Memorial Stadium; Terre Haute, IN	ESPN3	L 14–45	5,224	
November 3	1:00 pm	at Youngstown State	Stambaugh Stadium; Youngstown, OH	KDLT/ESPN3	L 10–13	11,076	
November 10	12:00 pm	Northern Iowa	DakotaDome; Vermillion, SD	ESPN3	L 21–24	8,476	
November 17	2:00 pm	at No. 21 South Dakota State	Coughlin–Alumni Stadium; Brookings, SD (rivalry)	Midco Sports Net	L 8–31	15,278	
*Non-conference game; Rankings from The Sports Network Poll released prior to the game; All times are in Central time
