= 2007 Illinois State Redbirds football team =

American college football season

2007 Illinois State Redbirds football
- Conference: Gateway Football Conference
- Record: 4–7 (2–4 Gateway)
- Head coach: Denver Johnson (8th season)
- MVPs: Isaiah Wiggins; Kye Stewart
- Captain: Game captains
- Home stadium: Hancock Stadium

2007 Gateway Football Conference standings
	Conf.			Overall
Team	W		L	W		L
No. 4 Northern Iowa $^	6	–	0	12	–	1
No. 3 Southern Illinois ^	5	–	1	12	–	2
No. 16 Youngstown State	3	–	3	7	–	4
Western Illinois	3	–	3	6	–	5
Missouri State	2	–	4	6	–	5
Illinois State	2	–	4	4	–	7
Indiana State	0	–	6	0	–	11
$ – Conference champion; ^ – FCS playoff participant; Rankings from The Sports Network poll

The 2007 Illinois State Redbirds football team represented Illinois State University as a member of the Gateway Football Conference during the 2007 NCAA Division I FCS football season. Led by eighth-year head coach Denver Johnson, the Redbirds compiled an overall record of 4–7 with a mark of 2–4 in conference play, tying for fifth place in the Gateway. Illinois State played home games at Hancock Stadium in Normal, Illinois.

== Schedule ==
Date	Time	Opponent	Rank	Site	Result	Attendance	Source
August 30		Drake*	No. 7	Hancock Stadium; Normal, IL	L 24–27	12,167	
September 8		Murray State*	No. 17	Hancock Stadium; Normal, IL	W 43–17	13,214	
September 15		at No. 14 Eastern Illinois*	No. 17	O'Brien Field; Charleston, IL (rivalry)	W 24–21	9,028	
September 22	1:00 p.m.	at No. 25 (FBS) Missouri*	No. 14	Faurot Field; Columbia, MO	L 17–38	56,137	
September 29	1:30 p.m.	No. 3 Northern Iowa	No. 16	Hancock Stadium; Normal, IL	L 13–23	10,473	
October 6		at Missouri State	No. 23	Robert W. Plaster Stadium; Springfield, MO	L 41–58	11,058	
October 13		Indiana State^{†}		Hancock Stadium; Normal, IL	W 69–17	14,077	
October 20		at No. 12 Youngstown State		Stambaugh Stadium; Youngstown, OH	W 27–22	18,616	
October 27		No. 24 Western Illinois		Hancock Stadium; Normal, IL	L 14–27	15,118	
November 3	6:00 p.m.	at No. 2 North Dakota State*		Fargodome; Fargo, ND (Harvest Bowl)	L 28–54	18,116	
November 10		at No. 5 Southern Illinois		McAndrew Stadium; Carbondale, IL	L 24–34	9,259	
*Non-conference game; ^{†}Homecoming; Rankings from The Sports Network Poll released prior to the game; All times are in Central time
