= 2006 Southern Illinois Salukis football team =

American college football season

2006 Southern Illinois Salukis football

NCAA Division I Quarterfinal, L 3–20 vs. Montana
- Conference: Gateway Football Conference

Ranking
- Sports Network: No. 7
- Record: 9–4 (4–3 Gateway)
- Head coach: Jerry Kill (6th season)
- Offensive coordinator: Matt Limegrover (6th season)
- Defensive coordinator: Tracy Claeys (6th season)
- Home stadium: McAndrew Stadium

2006 Gateway Football Conference standings
	Conf.			Overall
Team	W		L	W		L
No. 4 Youngstown State $^	6	–	1	11	–	3
No. 8 Illinois State ^	5	–	2	9	–	4
No. 17 Northern Iowa	5	–	2	7	–	4
No. 7 Southern Illinois ^	4	–	3	9	–	4
Western Kentucky	4	–	3	6	–	5
Western Illinois	2	–	5	5	–	6
Missouri State	1	–	6	2	–	9
Indiana State	1	–	6	1	–	10
$ – Conference champion; ^ – FCS playoff participant; Rankings from The Sports Network poll

The 2006 Southern Illinois Salukis football team represented Southern Illinois University as a member of the Gateway Football Conference during the 2006 NCAA Division I FCS football season. They were led by sixth-year head coach Jerry Kill and played their home games at McAndrew Stadium in Carbondale, Illinois. The Salukis finished the season with a 9–4 record overall and a 4–3 record in conference play. The team received an at-large bid to the FCS playoffs, where they defeated Tennessee–Martin before losing to Montana in the quarterfinals. Southern Illinois was ranked No. 7 in The Sports Network's postseason ranking of FCS teams.

== Schedule ==
Date	Time	Opponent	Rank	Site	TV	Result	Attendance	Source
August 31		Lock Haven*	No. 17	McAndrew Stadium; Carbondale, IL		W 49–0	9,636	
September 16		at Indiana*	No. 16	Memorial Stadium; Bloomington, IN	Mediacom	W 35–28	31,156	
September 23		at Arkansas–Pine Bluff*	No. 10	Golden Lion Stadium; Pine Bluff, AR		W 48–16	3,910	
September 30		Indiana State	No. 10	McAndrew Stadium; Carbondale, IL		W 55–3	13,524	
October 7		Western Illinois^{†}	No. 9	McAndrew Stadium; Carbondale, IL		W 31–24	13,721	
October 14		at No. 5 Illinois State	No. 7	Hancock Stadium; Normal, IL		L 10–37	17,237	
October 21		Western Kentucky	No. 13	McAndrew Stadium; Carbondale, IL		L 24–27	11,024	
October 28		at Missouri State	No. 19	Plaster Sports Complex; Springfield, MO		W 27–17	10,180	
November 4		at No. 7 Youngstown State	No. 12	Stambaugh Stadium; Youngstown, OH		L 24–31	14,095	
November 11	3:00 p.m.	No. 12 Northern Iowa	No. 14	McAndrew Stadium; Carbondale, IL		W 47–23	7,422	
November 18		Southern Utah*	No. 11	McAndrew Stadium; Carbondale, IL		W 59–0	5,535	
November 25		No. 12 Tennessee–Martin*	No. 10	McAndrew Stadium; Carbondale, IL (NCAA Division I First Round)		W 36–30	5,694	
December 2	1:30 p.m.	at No. 2 Montana*	No. 10	Washington–Grizzly Stadium; Missoula, MT (NCAA Division I Quarterfinal)	KPAX	L 3–20	18,883	
*Non-conference game; ^{†}Homecoming; Rankings from The Sports Network Poll released prior to the game; All times are in Central time
