= 2012 Western Illinois Leathernecks football team =

American college football season

2012 Western Illinois Leathernecks football
- Conference: Missouri Valley Football Conference
- Record: 3–8 (1–7 MVFC)
- Head coach: Mark Hendrickson (5th season)
- Offensive coordinator: KiJuan Ware (1st season)
- Defensive coordinator: Brian Ward (1st season)
- Home stadium: Hanson Field

2012 Missouri Valley Football Conference standings
	Conf.			Overall
Team	W		L	W		L
No. 1 North Dakota State $^	7	–	1	14	–	1
No. 14 South Dakota State ^	6	–	2	9	–	4
No. 8 Illinois State ^	5	–	3	9	–	4
Indiana State	5	–	3	7	–	4
Southern Illinois	5	–	3	6	–	5
Youngstown State	4	–	4	7	–	4
Northern Iowa	4	–	4	5	–	6
Missouri State	3	–	5	3	–	8
Western Illinois	1	–	7	3	–	8
South Dakota	0	–	8	1	–	10
$ – Conference champion; ^ – FCS playoff participant; Rankings from The Sports Network poll

The 2012 Western Illinois Leathernecks football team represented Western Illinois University as a member of the Missouri Valley Football Conference (MVFC) during the 2012 NCAA Division I FCS football season. Led by Mark Hendrickson in his fifth and final season as head coach, the Leathernecks compiled an overall record of 3–8 overall with mark of 1–7 in conference play, placing ninth in the MVFC. Western Illinois played home games at Hanson Field in Macomb, Illinois.

== Schedule ==
Date	Time	Opponent	Site	TV	Result	Attendance
August 30	6:00 pm	Butler*	Hanson Field; Macomb, IL		W 23–15	12,589
September 8	3:00 pm	Indianapolis*	Hanson Field; Macomb, IL		W 27–17	13,411
September 15	7:00 pm	at Iowa State*	Jack Trice Stadium; Ames, IA		L 3–37	55,783
September 22	3:00 pm	No. 15 Illinois State^{†}	Hanson Field; Macomb, IL	Comcast	L 3–23	16,033
October 6	2:00 pm	at South Dakota	DakotaDome; Vermillion, SD	Midco Sports Net	W 24–17	10,196
October 13	6:00 pm	at No. 20 South Dakota State	Coughlin–Alumni Stadium; Brookings, SD	MVFC TV	L 10–31	10,727
October 20	6:00 pm	No. 21 Indiana State	Hanson Field; Macomb, IL		L 7–23	9,478
October 27	1:00 pm	at Missouri State	Plaster Sports Complex; Springfield, MO	MVFC TV	L 3–42	10,076
November 3	1:00 pm	Northern Iowa	Hanson Field; Macomb, IL	MVFC TV	L 40–0	3,094
November 10	1:00 pm	Youngstown State	Hanson Field; Macomb, IL	ESPN3	L 7–31	3,286
November 17	2:00 pm	at Southern Illinois	Saluki Stadium; Carbondale, IL		L 0–35	7,899
*Non-conference game; ^{†}Homecoming; Rankings from The Sports Network Poll released prior to the game; All times are in Central time
