= 2012 Youngstown State Penguins football team =

American college football season

2012 Youngstown State Penguins football
- Conference: Missouri Valley Football Conference
- Record: 7–4 (4–4 MVFC)
- Head coach: Eric Wolford (3rd season)
- Offensive coordinator: Shane Montgomery (3rd season)
- Defensive coordinator: Joe Tresey (1st season)
- Home stadium: Stambaugh Stadium

2012 Missouri Valley Football Conference standings
	Conf.			Overall
Team	W		L	W		L
No. 1 North Dakota State $^	7	–	1	14	–	1
No. 14 South Dakota State ^	6	–	2	9	–	4
No. 8 Illinois State ^	5	–	3	9	–	4
Indiana State	5	–	3	7	–	4
Southern Illinois	5	–	3	6	–	5
Youngstown State	4	–	4	7	–	4
Northern Iowa	4	–	4	5	–	6
Missouri State	3	–	5	3	–	8
Western Illinois	1	–	7	3	–	8
South Dakota	0	–	8	1	–	10
$ – Conference champion; ^ – FCS playoff participant; Rankings from The Sports Network poll

The 2012 Youngstown State Penguins football team represented Youngstown State University as a member of the Missouri Valley Football Conference (MVFC) during the 2012 NCAA Division I FCS football season. Led by third-year head coach Eric Wolford, the Penguins compiled an overall record of 7–4 with a mark of 4–4 in conference play, tying for fourth place in the MVFC. Youngstown State played their home games at Stambaugh Stadium in Youngstown, Ohio.

== Schedule ==
Date	Time	Opponent	Rank	Site	TV	Result	Attendance	Source
September 1	6:00 pm	at Pittsburgh*	No. 13	Heinz Field; Pittsburgh, PA	ESPN3	W 31–17	40,837	
September 8	4:00 pm	Valparaiso*	No. 6	Stambaugh Stadium; Youngstown, OH	My YTV (tape delayed)	W 59–0	15,347	
September 15	4:00 pm	Albany*	No. 5	Stambaugh Stadium; Youngstown, OH	My YTV (tape delayed)	W 31–24	15,840	
September 22	7:00 pm	No. 8 Northern Iowa	No. 4	Stambaugh Stadium; Youngstown, OH	ESPN3/ My YTV (tape delayed)	W 42–35	19,277	
October 6	2:00 pm	at No. 1 North Dakota State	No. 3	Fargodome; Fargo, ND	WFMJ, ESPN3	L 7–48	19,065	
October 13	2:00 pm	at No. 14 Illinois State	No. 8	Hancock Stadium; Normal, IL	WBCB, ESPN3	L 28–35	5,557	
October 20	4:00 pm	Southern Illinois	No. 15	Stambaugh Stadium; Youngstown, OH	My YTV (tape delayed)	L 21–38	13,079	
October 27	3:00 pm	at South Dakota State	No. 22	Coughlin–Alumni Stadium; Brookings, SD	WFMJ/ESPN3	L 28–41	14,966	
November 3	2:00 pm	South Dakota		Stambaugh Stadium; Youngstown, OH	ESPN, My YTV (tape delayed)	W 13–10	11,076	
November 10	2:00 pm	at Western Illinois		Hanson Field; Macomb, IL	WFMJ, ESPN3	W 31–7	3,286	
November 17	2:00 pm	No. 18 Indiana State		Stambaugh Stadium; Youngstown, OH	My YTV, ESPN3	W 27–6	9,610	
*Non-conference game; Rankings from The Sports Network Poll released prior to the game; All times are in Eastern time

== Rankings ==
Ranking movements Legend: ██ Increase in ranking ██ Decrease in ranking RV = Received votes
	Week																
Poll	Pre	1	2	3	4	5	6	7	8	9	10	11	12	13	14	15	Final
Sports Network	13	6	5	4	3	3	8	15	22	RV							
Coaches	18	10	8	3	3	3	9	16	21	RV							
