= Kye Stewart =

American football player and coach (born 1985)

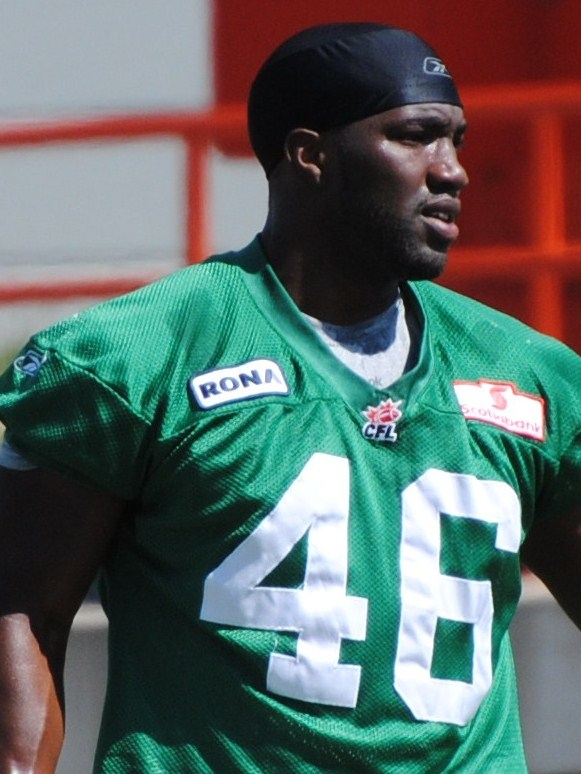
- Stewart with the Saskatchewan Roughriders in 2010

Illinois State Redbirds
- Title: Special teams coordinator & outside linebackers coach

Personal information
- Born: February 17, 1985 (age 41); Nashville, Tennessee, U.S.
- Listed height: 6 ft 0 in (1.83 m)
- Listed weight: 210 lb (95 kg)

Career information
- College: Illinois State (2003–2007)
- NFL draft: 2008: undrafted

Career history

Playing
- Saskatchewan Roughriders (2009–2011); Edmonton Eskimos (2012)

Coaching
- Memphis (2013–2015) Graduate assistant; Alcorn State (2016–2017) Defensive line coach; Illinois State (2018–2024) Outside linebackers coach; Illinois State (2025) Co-special teams coordinator & outside linebackers coach; Illinois State (2026–present) Associate head coach, special teams coordinator & outside linebackers coach

Awards and highlights
- First-Team All-GFC (2006–2007)

Kye Stewart (born February 17, 1985) is an American college football coach and former linebacker. He is the special teams coordinator and outside linebackers coach for Illinois State University, positions he has held since 2025 and 2018 respectively. He played college football at Illinois State, and was signed by the Saskatchewan Roughriders of the Canadian Football League (CFL) as an undrafted free agent in 2009. He was also a member of the Edmonton Eskimos of the CFL.

== College career ==
Stewart played college football for Illinois State as a linebacker from 2003 to 2007. In 2004, he missed the final four games of the season due to a stress fracture in his leg. In 2006 and 2007, he was named First-Team All-GFC.

== Professional career ==
=== Saskatchewan Roughriders ===
After going undrafted in the 2008 NFL Draft, Stewart signed with the Saskatchewan Roughriders of the Canadian Football League (CFL). In 2009, he tore his ACL. On February 14, 2011, he resigned with Roughriders. On May, 11, 2012, he was released.

=== Edmonton Eskimos ===
In 2012, Stewart signed with the Edmonton Eskimos. On May 8, 2013, he was released.

== Coaching career ==
In 2013, Stewart joined Memphis as a graduate assistant.

In 2016, Stewart was hired as the defensive line coach for Alcorn State.

In 2018, Stewart was hired as the outside linebackers coach for his alma mater, Illinois State.
