= 2006 Western Kentucky Hilltoppers football team =

American college football season

2006 Western Kentucky Hilltoppers football
- Conference: Gateway Football Conference
- Record: 6–5 (4–3 Gateway)
- Head coach: David Elson (4th season)
- Offensive coordinator: T. J. Weist (4th season)
- Offensive scheme: Multiple
- Base defense: 3–4
- Home stadium: L. T. Smith Stadium

2006 Gateway Football Conference standings
	Conf.			Overall
Team	W		L	W		L
No. 4 Youngstown State $^	6	–	1	11	–	3
No. 8 Illinois State ^	5	–	2	9	–	4
No. 17 Northern Iowa	5	–	2	7	–	4
No. 7 Southern Illinois ^	4	–	3	9	–	4
Western Kentucky	4	–	3	6	–	5
Western Illinois	2	–	5	5	–	6
Missouri State	1	–	6	2	–	9
Indiana State	1	–	6	1	–	10
$ – Conference champion; ^ – FCS playoff participant; Rankings from The Sports Network poll

The 2006 Western Kentucky Hilltoppers football team represented Western Kentucky University in the 2006 NCAA Division I FCS football season and were led by head coach David Elson. It was the school's last season as a member of Gateway Football Conference before their transition to the FBS. The Hilltoppers' schedule was rigorous, with seven ranked opponents, including Georgia.

This team's roster included future National Football League (NFL) players Curtis Hamilton, Dan Cline, and Greg Ryan. Hamilton was named to the Hanson All American team. The All-Conference team included Hamilton, Marion Rumph, Dusty Bear, Blake Boyd, Andre Lewis, and Chris Sullivan.

== Schedule ==
Date	Time	Opponent	Site	TV	Result	Attendance	Source
September 2	11:30 a.m.	at No. 15 (FBS) Georgia*	Sanford Stadium; Athens, GA	LFS	L 12–48	92,746	
September 9		at No. 23 Eastern Kentucky*	Roy Kidd Stadium; Richmond, KY (Battle of the Bluegrass)		L 21–26	19,800	
September 16	6:00 p.m.	Chattanooga*	L. T. Smith Stadium; Bowling Green, KY		W 28–21	9,322	
September 30		No. 21 Western Illinois	L. T. Smith Stadium; Bowling Green, KY		W 38–35	11,710	
October 7		No. 6 Illinois State	L. T. Smith Stadium; Bowling Green, KY		L 27–28	7,661	
October 14		at Missouri State	Robert W. Plaster Stadium; Springfield, MO		W 17–14	9,405	
October 21		at No. 13 Southern Illinois	Saluki Stadium; Carbondale, IL		W 27–24	11,024	
October 28		Indiana State^{†}	L. T. Smith Stadium; Bowling Green, KY		W 41–3	12,424	
November 4	4:05 p.m.	at No. 14 Northern Iowa	UNI-Dome; Cedar Falls, IA		L 20–31	8,746	
November 11		No. 6 Youngstown State	L. T. Smith Stadium; Bowling Green, KY		L 3–19	7,312	
November 18		Austin Peay*	L. T. Smith Stadium; Bowling Green, KY		W 24–14	5,877	
*Non-conference game; ^{†}Homecoming; Rankings from The Sports Network Poll released prior to the game; All times are in Central time
