= 2012 Southern Illinois Salukis football team =

American college football season

2012 Southern Illinois Salukis football
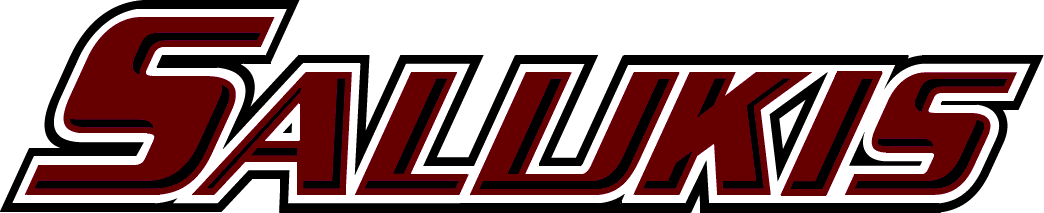
- Conference: Missouri Valley Football Conference
- Record: 6–5 (5–3 MVFC)
- Head coach: Dale Lennon (5th season)
- Offensive coordinator: Kalen DeBoer (3rd season)
- Defensive coordinator: Bubba Schweigert (3rd season)
- Home stadium: Saluki Stadium

2012 Missouri Valley Football Conference standings
	Conf.			Overall
Team	W		L	W		L
No. 1 North Dakota State $^	7	–	1	14	–	1
No. 14 South Dakota State ^	6	–	2	9	–	4
No. 8 Illinois State ^	5	–	3	9	–	4
Indiana State	5	–	3	7	–	4
Southern Illinois	5	–	3	6	–	5
Youngstown State	4	–	4	7	–	4
Northern Iowa	4	–	4	5	–	6
Missouri State	3	–	5	3	–	8
Western Illinois	1	–	7	3	–	8
South Dakota	0	–	8	1	–	10
$ – Conference champion; ^ – FCS playoff participant; Rankings from The Sports Network poll

The 2012 Southern Illinois Salukis football team represented Southern Illinois University Carbondale as a member of the Missouri Valley Football Conference (MVFC) during the 2012 NCAA Division I FCS football season. Led by fifth-year head coach Dale Lennon, the Salukis compiled an overall record of 6–5 with a mark of 5–3 in conference play, placing in a three-way tie for third in the MVFC. Southern Illinois played home games at Saluki Stadium in Carbondale, Illinois.

== Schedule ==
Date	Time	Opponent	Site	TV	Result	Attendance	Source
August 30	6:30 pm	at Eastern Illinois*	O'Brien Stadium; Charleston, IL	WEIU	L 28–49	8,275	
September 8	1:00 pm	at Miami (OH)*	Yager Stadium; Oxford, OH	ESPN3	L 14–30	17,725	
September 15	6:00 pm	Southeast Missouri State*	Saluki Stadium; Carbondale, IL		W 35–14	9,612	
September 22	1:00 pm	at Missouri State	Plaster Sports Complex; Springfield, MO	MVFC TV	W 14–6	9,217	
September 29	6:00 pm	Indiana State	Saluki Stadium; Carbondale, IL	ESPN3/MVFC TV	L 3–24	12,166	
October 6	1:00 pm	at No. 9 Illinois State	Hancock Stadium; Normal, IL	MVFC TV	W 17–0	8,000	
October 13	2:00 pm	Northern Iowa^{†}	Saluki Stadium; Carbondale, IL		W 34–31	10,575	
October 20	3:00 pm	at No. 15 Youngstown State	Stambaugh Stadium; Youngstown, OH		W 38–21	13,079	
October 27	3:00 pm	at No. 3 North Dakota State	Fargodome; Fargo, ND	FCS	L 17–23	18,066	
November 3	2:00 pm	No. 21 South Dakota State	Saluki Stadium; Carbondale, IL		L 12–16	7,499	
November 17	2:00 pm	Western Illinois	Saluki Stadium; Carbondale, IL		W 35–0	7,899	
*Non-conference game; ^{†}Homecoming; Rankings from The Sports Network Poll released prior to the game; All times are in Central time
