= 2012 Northern Iowa Panthers football team =

American college football season

2012 Northern Iowa Panthers football
- Conference: Missouri Valley Football Conference
- Record: 5–6 (4–4 MVFC)
- Head coach: Mark Farley (12th season)
- Co-offensive coordinators: Bill Salmon (12th season); Mario Verduzco (7th season)
- Defensive coordinator: Matt Entz (1st season)
- Home stadium: UNI-Dome

2012 Missouri Valley Football Conference standings
	Conf.			Overall
Team	W		L	W		L
No. 1 North Dakota State $^	7	–	1	14	–	1
No. 14 South Dakota State ^	6	–	2	9	–	4
No. 8 Illinois State ^	5	–	3	9	–	4
Indiana State	5	–	3	7	–	4
Southern Illinois	5	–	3	6	–	5
Youngstown State	4	–	4	7	–	4
Northern Iowa	4	–	4	5	–	6
Missouri State	3	–	5	3	–	8
Western Illinois	1	–	7	3	–	8
South Dakota	0	–	8	1	–	10
$ – Conference champion; ^ – FCS playoff participant; Rankings from The Sports Network poll

The 2012 Northern Iowa Panthers football team represented the University of Northern Iowa as a member of the Missouri Valley Football Conference (MVFC) during the 2012 NCAA Division I FCS football season. Led by 12th-year head coach Mark Farley, the Panthers compiled an overall record of 5–6 with a mark of 4–4 in conference play, tying for sixth place in the MVFC. The team played home games at the UNI-Dome in Cedar Falls, Iowa.

== Schedule ==
Date	Time	Opponent	Rank	Site	TV	Result	Attendance
September 1	2:30 pm	at No. 12 (FBS) Wisconsin*	No. 9	Camp Randall Stadium; Madison, WI	BTN	L 21–26	79,568
September 8	6:00 pm	Central State (OH)*	No. 8	UNI-Dome; Cedar Falls, IA	Panther Sports Network	W 59–0	12,012
September 15	2:30 pm	at Iowa*	No. 7	Kinnick Stadium; Iowa City, IA	BTN	L 16–27	70,585
September 22	7:00 pm	at No. 4 Youngstown State	No. 8	Stambaugh Stadium; Youngstown, OH	ESPN3	L 35–42	19,277
September 29	6:00 pm	No. 1 North Dakota State	No. 14	UNI-Dome; Cedar Falls, IA	Panther Sports Network	L 21–33	16,008
October 13	2:00 pm	at Southern Illinois		Saluki Stadium; Carbondale, IL		L 31–34	10,575
October 20	4:00 pm	No. 20 South Dakota State^{†}		UNI-Dome; Cedar Falls, IA	MVFC TV	W 27–6	13,067
October 27	4:00 pm	No. 17 Illinois State		UNI-Dome; Cedar Falls, IA	Comcast Illinois	L 21–33	9,946
November 3	1:00 pm	at Western Illinois		Hanson Field; Macomb, IL	MVFC TV	W 40–0	3,094
November 10	12:00 pm	at South Dakota		Dakota Dome; Vermillion, SD	MVFC TV, ESPN3	W 24–21	8,476
November 17	4:00 pm	Missouri State		UNI-Dome; Cedar Falls, IA		W 38–13	8,493
*Non-conference game; ^{†}Homecoming; Rankings from The Sports Network Poll released prior to the game; All times are in Central time

== Rankings ==
Ranking movements Legend: ██ Increase in ranking ██ Decrease in ranking — = Not ranked RV = Received votes
	Week														
Poll	Pre	1	2	3	4	5	6	7	8	9	10	11	12	13	Final
The Sports Network	9	8	7	8	14	22	RV	RV	RV	RV	RV	RV	RV	RV	RV
College Sports Journal Poll	9														
FCS Coaches	7	7	6	8	17	25	RV	—	RV	RV	RV	RV	RV	RV	RV

== Personnel ==
=== Coaching staff ===
Name	Position	Year at Northern Iowa	Alma mater (year)
Mark Farley	Head coach	12th	Northern Iowa (1987)
Rick Nelson	Offensive line	13th	Northern Iowa (1984)
Bill Salmon	Associate head coach Offensive coordinator	12th	Northern Iowa (1980)
Mario Verduzco	Co-offensive coordinator Quarterbacks	12th	San José State (1988)
Jeremiah Johnson	Defensive backs	6th	Kansas (2000)
Dan Clark	Tight ends	3rd	Simpson (1995)
Travis Williams	Linebackers	1st	Auburn (2005)
Matt Entz	Defensive coordinator/defensive line	3rd	Wartburg (1995)
Todd Blythe	Offensive assistant	1st	Iowa State (2008)
Daniel Bullocks	Defensive assistant	1st	Nebraska (2005)
D. J. Hord	Graduate assistant	1st	Notre Dame (2009)
