= 2007 Northern Iowa Panthers football team =

American college football season

2007 Northern Iowa Panthers football

Gateway champion

NCAA Division I Quarterfinal, L 27–39 vs. Delaware
- Conference: Gateway Football Conference

Ranking
- Sports Network: No. 4
- FCS Coaches: No. 5
- Record: 12–1 (6–0 Gateway)
- Head coach: Mark Farley (7th season)
- Co-offensive coordinators: Bill Salmon (7th season); Mario Verduzco (2nd season)
- Home stadium: UNI-Dome

2007 Gateway Football Conference standings
	Conf.			Overall
Team	W		L	W		L
No. 4 Northern Iowa $^	6	–	0	12	–	1
No. 3 Southern Illinois ^	5	–	1	12	–	2
No. 16 Youngstown State	3	–	3	7	–	4
Western Illinois	3	–	3	6	–	5
Missouri State	2	–	4	6	–	5
Illinois State	2	–	4	4	–	7
Indiana State	0	–	6	0	–	11
$ – Conference champion; ^ – FCS playoff participant; Rankings from The Sports Network poll

The 2007 Northern Iowa Panthers football team was an American football team that represented the University of Northern Iowa as a member of the Gateway Football Conference (Gateway Conference) during the 2007 NCAA Division I FCS football season. In its seventh year under head coach Mark Farley, the team compiled a 12–1 record (6–0 in conference games), outscored opponents by a total of 469 to 219, and won the Gateway Conference championship. The team was the first Gateay team to go 11-0 during the regular season and was ranked No. 1 nationally for eight weeks. The Panthers advanced to the Division I FCS playoffs, where they defeated New Hampshire in the first round before losing to Delaware in the quarterfinals. The 469 points scored by the Panthers remains a school record as of 2026. Mark Farley won the Eddie Robinson Award as the top coach in Division I FCS football.

Quarterback Eric Sanders completed 237 of 315 passes (75.2%), finished second in the voting for the Walter Payton Award as the most outstanding offensive player in Division I FCS, and was selected as the Gateway offensive player of the year. Linebacker Brannon Carter, a converted wide receiver, was selected as the Gateway defensive player of the year. Carter, offensive tackle Chad Rinehart, defensive lineman Mark Huygens received first-team honors on the 2007 FCS All-America team. Nine Northern Iowa players were selected as first-team players on the 2007 all-Gateway Conference football team: Sanders; Carter; Rinehart; offensive linemen Barret Anderson and Brandon Keith; wide receiver Johnny Gray; running back Corey Lewis; defensive lineman James Ruffin; and defensive back Clifford Waters. Six others were named to the second team. Lewis led the team with 1,513 rushing yards (the second highest single-season tally in school history) and 16 touchdowns. Gray led the team with 70 receptions and 910 receiving yards; he also gained an average of 16.89 yards on 18 punt returns, the second highest average in school history.

The team played its home games at the UNI-Dome in Cedar Falls, Iowa.

== Schedule ==
Date	Time	Opponent	Rank	Site	TV	Result	Attendance	Source
August 30	7:05 pm	Minnesota State*	No. 9	UNI-Dome; Cedar Falls, IA		W 41–14	15,056	
September 8	6:00 pm	at Iowa State*	No. 7	Jack Trice Stadium; Ames, IA		W 24–13	56,795	
September 15	7:00 pm	at South Dakota State*	No. 5	Coughlin-Alumni Stadium; Brookings, SD		W 31–17	10,844	
September 22	4:00 pm	at Drake*	No. 4	Drake Stadium; Des Moines, IA (Scheels Kickoff Classic, rivalry)	Mediacom	W 45–7	10,216	
September 29	1:30 pm	at No. 16 Illinois State	No. 3	Hancock Stadium; Normal, IL		W 23–13	10,473	
October 13	4:05 pm	No. 7 Southern Illinois^{†}	No. 2	UNI-Dome; Cedar Falls, IA	Mediacom, CFU	W 30–24	17,074	
October 20	6:35 pm	at No. 17 Western Illinois	No. 1	Hanson Field; Macomb, IL	FSNM, FCS, MS-KC, CFU	W 42–3	15,330	
October 27	4:05 pm	Youngstown State	No. 1	UNI-Dome; Cedar Falls, IA	KFXA, KDSM, WFMJ, FCS, MS-KC	W 14–13	16,528	
November 3	1:00 pm	at Missouri State	No. 1	Plaster Sports Complex; Springfield, MO	Mediacom	W 38–17	10,590	
November 10	5:05 pm	Indiana State	No. 1	UNI-Dome; Cedar Falls, IA	CFU	W 68–14	16,624	
November 17	5:05 pm	Southern Utah*	No. 1	UNI-Dome; Cedar Falls, IA	CFU	W 48–10	15,724	
November 24	6:35 pm	No. 17 New Hampshire*	No. 1	UNI-Dome; Cedar Falls, IA (NCAA Division I First Round)	Mediacom, CFU	W 38–35	16,015	
December 1	1:00 pm	No. 13 Delaware*	No. 1	UNI-Dome; Cedar Falls, IA (NCAA Division I Quarterfinal)	ESPNGP, Mediacom, CFU	L 27–39	15,803	
*Non-conference game; ^{†}Homecoming; Rankings from The Sports Network Poll released prior to the game; All times are in Central time

== Rankings ==
Ranking movements Legend: ██ Increase in ranking ██ Decrease in ranking — = Not ranked RV = Received votes
	Week													
Poll	Pre	1	2	3	4	5	6	7	8	9	10	11	12	Final
The Sports Network	9	7	5	4	3	2	2	1	1	1	1	1	1	4
FCS Coaches	9	7	5	5	4	4	3	2	2	2	2	2	1	5
AP	—	—	—	—	—	—	—	—	—	—	—	—	RV	—

== Season summary ==
- The Panthers moved into the top spot in The Sports Network's FCS Top 25 poll on October 15. It marked the first time the Panthers had been perched in the No. 1 spot in the nation since the Sports Network's poll on November 5, 1992.
- On November 19, UNI became the consensus No. 1-ranked team in the nation after taking over the top spot in the FCS Coaches poll.
- On November 8, Northern Iowa was ranked 30th in the nation in the Sagarin ratings. The Sagarin ratings take into account all members of Division I football.
- UNI became the first-ever Gateway Football Conference school to win all six of its regular season road contests in a single season.
- University of Northern Iowa (11–0) topped the bracket as the top seed after capturing the automatic qualifying berth from the Gateway Football Conference. The Panthers are making their 13th tournament appearance.
- For the first time in school history the University of Northern Iowa football team drew a seed for the NCAA Football Championship Subdivision playoffs.
- In scoring its first win over Iowa State since 1994, UNI improved its record against teams from the Football Bowl Subdivision (formerly Division I-A) to 9–15 since 1985.
- On November 18, Northern Iowa received points in the Associated Press Top 25 poll. They received 1 point; that vote came from Ray Ratto of the San Francisco Chronicle. The Panthers became the second FCS school to receive votes in the poll, following Appalachian State who had received up to 19 votes earlier in the season.
- In 23 years of league play, UNI has now captured at least a share of the Gateway Football Conference title in 13 of those seasons with nine of those being outright championships.
- UNI completed the first-ever perfect regular season in the 23-year history of the Gateway Football Conference with a record of 11–0. UNI's 6–0 mark in Gateway play marked the ninth time in league history a team went undefeated against conference competition. It was the fifth time UNI has completed Gateway play with an unblemished record.
- OL Chad Rinehart was named to the Senior Bowl North team.

== Coaching staff ==
Name	Position	Year at Northern Iowa	Alma mater (year)
Mark Farley	Head coach	7th	Northern Iowa (1987)
Rick Nelson	Recruiting coordinator Offensive Line	8th	Northern Iowa (1984)
Bill Salmon	Associate head coach Offensive coordinator Receivers	7th	Northern Iowa (1980)
Mario Verduzco	Co-offensive coordinator Quarterbacks	7th	San Jose State (1988)
Atif Austin	Running backs	3rd	Iowa State (2003)
Scott Frost	Linebackers	1st	Nebraska (1997)
Chris Klieman	Secondary	2nd	Northern Iowa (1990)
Jerry Montgomery	Defensive line	2nd	Iowa (2001)
Keith Harms	Defensive assistant	4th	Buena Vista (1979)
Erik Chinander	Tight ends	4th	Iowa (2003)

== Team players drafted into the NFL ==
Player	Position	Round	Pick	NFL club
Chad Rinehart	Tackle	3	96	Washington Redskins
Brandon Keith	Tackle	7	225	Arizona Cardinals
