= Nate Palmer =

American football player (born 1989)

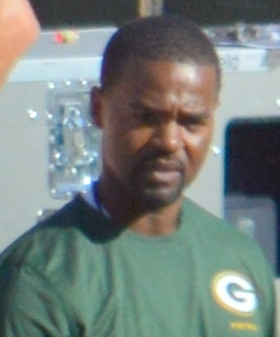
- Palmer with the Green Bay Packers in 2013

No. 50, 51
- Position: Linebacker

Personal information
- Born: September 23, 1989 (age 37); Chicago, Illinois, U.S.
- Listed height: 6 ft 2 in (1.88 m)
- Listed weight: 248 lb (112 kg)

Career information
- High school: Simeon (Chicago)
- College: Illinois State
- NFL draft: 2013: 6th round, 193rd overall pick

Career history
- Green Bay Packers (2013–2015); Tennessee Titans (2016–2018)

Career NFL statistics
- Total tackles: 108
- Sacks: 1
- Stats at Pro Football Reference

Nathan Palmer Jr. (born September 23, 1989) is an American former professional football player who was a linebacker in the National Football League (NFL). He played college football for the Illinois Fighting Illini and Illinois State Redbirds. Palmer was selected by the Green Bay Packers in the sixth round of the 2013 NFL draft.

== Early life ==
Palmer was born in Chicago and attended Simeon Career Academy. During his time there, he lettered in baseball, track and field, basketball, and football. Palmer was also a teammate to future Chicago Bulls point guard Derrick Rose. In football, he played defensive end, tight end, linebacker, and on the offensive line. He only played four games during his junior year due to injury, however he still had 30 tackles and seven sacks. As a senior, Palmer had 128 tackles and 18 sacks on defense, while catching 10 passes for 250 yards and a touchdown on offense. His performance earned him a spot on the 2007 Chicago Sun-Times All-Public League Team.

He was listed as a three star prospect by Rivals.com and as the 17th best player in the state of Illinois. Palmer received one scholarship offer from the Illinois Fighting Illini.

== College career ==
Palmer began his college career at the University of Illinois Urbana-Champaign . He was redshirted his first year with the Fighting Illini. He played in every game in the 2009 season, primarily on special teams. He had two tackles against Ohio State, and one against Cincinnati. Additionally, he earned Academic All-Big Ten honors for the year. He played in nine games and recorded six tackles the following year.

Palmer transferred to Illinois State University and earned a starting spot at defensive end. He started every game in his first season for the Redbirds. In a game against Morehead State, he recorded a sack and recovered a fumble for a 42-yard touchdown, the first of his college career. Later, when Illinois State played North Dakota State, Palmer posted a career-high eight tackles. His performance for the season earned him All-Missouri Valley Conference honors at the end of the season. He finished up his junior year with 9.5 sacks, leading the conference. He also had 46 tackles and two forced fumbles. During the final year of his college football career, Palmer again started every game of the season as a defensive end. During a game against Missouri State, he achieved a career-high nine tackles. He finished his career again being named to the All-Missouri Valley Football Conference second-team.

== Professional career ==
Pre-draft measurables
| Height | Weight | 40-yard dash | 10-yard split | 20-yard split | 20-yard shuttle | Three-cone drill | Vertical jump | Broad jump | Bench press | Wonderlic |
|---|---|---|---|---|---|---|---|---|---|---|
| 6 ft 2 in (1.88 m) | 248 lb (112 kg) | 4.70 s | 1.58 s | 2.71 s | 4.37 s | 6.98 s | 35.5 in (0.90 m) | 10 ft 5 in (3.18 m) | 20 reps | 15 |
All values are from Pro Day

=== Green Bay Packers ===
Palmer was selected in the sixth round (193rd overall) by the Green Bay Packers in the 2013 NFL draft. On May 10, 2013, he signed a contract with the Packers.

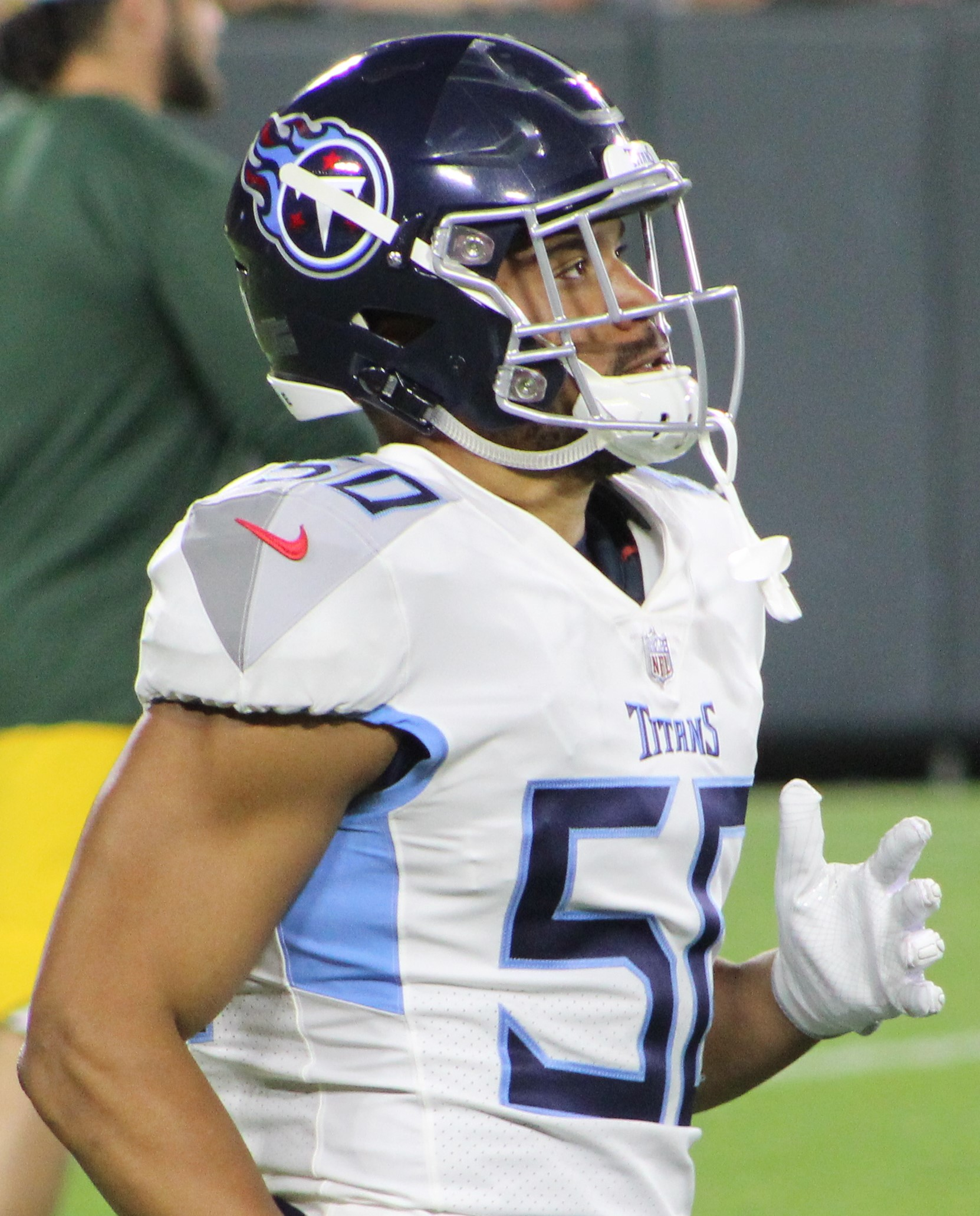
Palmer with the Titans in 2018

On August 30, 2014, Palmer was placed on injured reserve.

Palmer was released by the Packers on April 8, 2016.

=== Tennessee Titans ===
On April 11, 2016, Palmer was claimed off waivers by the Tennessee Titans. In 2016, Palmer notched a team-leading 12 special teams tackles.

On March 9, 2017, Palmer re-signed with the Titans. In 2017, he posted 10 special teams tackles, marking two consecutive seasons with double-digit special teams stops.

On August 7, 2018, Palmer was placed on injured reserve after being carted off in practice with a leg injury.

=== NFL statistics ===
Source: NFL.com

| Year | Team | G | GS | Tackles | | | | | Interceptions | | | | | | Fumbles | |
| Year | Team | G | GS | Total | Solo | Ast | Sck | SFTY | PDef | Int | Yds | Avg | Lng | TDs | FF | FR |
Regular season
| 2013 | GB | 8 | 2 | 17 | 8 | 9 | 0.0 | 0 | 0 | 0 | 0 | 0.0 | 0 | 0 | 0 | 0 |
| 2015 | GB | 16 | 10 | 68 | 47 | 21 | 1.0 | 0 | 2 | 0 | 0 | 0.0 | 0 | 0 | 0 | 0 |
| Total | | 24 | 12 | 85 | 55 | 30 | 1.0 | 0 | 2 | 0 | 0 | 0.0 | 0 | 0 | 0 | 0 |
Postseason
| 2015 | GB | 2 | 0 | 0 | 0 | 0 | 0.0 | 0 | 0 | 0 | 0 | 0.0 | 0 | 0 | 0 | 0 |
| Total | | 2 | 0 | 0 | 0 | 0 | 0.0 | 0 | 0 | 0 | 0 | 0.0 | 0 | 0 | 0 | 0 |
