= 2012 Missouri State Bears football team =

American college football season

2012 Missouri State Bears football
- Conference: Missouri Valley Football Conference
- Record: 3–8 (3–5 MVFC)
- Head coach: Terry Allen (7th season)
- Offensive coordinator: Rob Christophel (7th season)
- Offensive scheme: Spread
- Defensive coordinator: D. J. Vokolek (7th season)
- Base defense: 3–4
- Captains: Nate Davis; Cadarrius Dotson; Tevan Ferguson; Randy Richards; Matt Thayer
- Home stadium: Plaster Sports Complex

2012 Missouri Valley Football Conference standings
	Conf.			Overall
Team	W		L	W		L
No. 1 North Dakota State $^	7	–	1	14	–	1
No. 14 South Dakota State ^	6	–	2	9	–	4
No. 8 Illinois State ^	5	–	3	9	–	4
Indiana State	5	–	3	7	–	4
Southern Illinois	5	–	3	6	–	5
Youngstown State	4	–	4	7	–	4
Northern Iowa	4	–	4	5	–	6
Missouri State	3	–	5	3	–	8
Western Illinois	1	–	7	3	–	8
South Dakota	0	–	8	1	–	10
$ – Conference champion; ^ – FCS playoff participant; Rankings from The Sports Network poll

The 2012 Missouri State Bears football team represented Missouri State University as a member of the Missouri Valley Football Conference (MVFC) during the 2012 NCAA Division I FCS football season. Led by seventh-year head coach Terry Allen, the Bears compiled an overall record of 3–8 with a mark of 3–5 in conference play, placing eighth in the MVFC. Missouri State played home games at Plaster Sports Complex in Springfield, Missouri.

== Schedule ==
Date	Time	Opponent	Site	TV	Result	Attendance	Source
September 1	6:00 pm	at No. 21 (FBS) Kansas State*	Bill Snyder Family Football Stadium; Manhattan, KS		L 9–51	50,007	
September 8	2:30 pm	at No. 24 (FBS) Louisville*	Papa John's Cardinal Stadium; Louisville, KY	Big East Network	L 7–35	47,553	
September 15	7:00 pm	Murray State*	Plaster Sports Complex; Springfield, MO	Mediacom	L 23–28	10,002	
September 22	1:00 pm	Southern Illinois	Plaster Sports Complex; Springfield, MO	MVFC TV	L 6–14	9,217	
September 29	6:00 pm	at No. 25 South Dakota State	Coughlin–Alumni Stadium; Brookings, SD	MVFC TV	L 7–17	14,186	
October 6	2:00 pm	Indiana State	Memorial Stadium; Terre Haute, IN		L 17–31	8,311	
October 13	1:00 pm	South Dakota	Plaster Sports Complex; Springfield, MO	Mediacom	W 27–24	8,001	
October 20	1:00 pm	at No. 11 Illinois State	Hancock Stadium; Normal, IL		W 24–17	6,180	
October 27	1:00 pm	Western Illinois^{†}	Plaster Sports Complex; Springfield, MO	MVFC TV	W 42–3	10,076	
November 3	1:00 pm	No. 1 North Dakota State	Plaster Sports Complex; Springfield, MO		L 17–21	6,253	
November 17	6:00 pm	at Northern Iowa	UNI-Dome; Cedar Falls, IA		L 13–38	8,493	
*Non-conference game; ^{†}Homecoming; Rankings from The Sports Network Poll released prior to the game; All times are in Central time
