= 2012 North Dakota State Bison football team =

American college football season

2012 North Dakota State Bison football

NCAA Division I champion MVFC champion

NCAA Division I Championship, W 39–13 vs. Sam Houston State
- Conference: Missouri Valley Football Conference

Ranking
- Sports Network: No. 1
- FCS Coaches: No. 1
- Record: 14–1 (7–1 MVFC)
- Head coach: Craig Bohl (10th season)
- Offensive coordinator: Brent Vigen (4th season)
- Offensive scheme: Pro-style
- Defensive coordinator: Chris Klieman (1st season)
- Base defense: 4–3
- Home stadium: Fargodome

2012 Missouri Valley Football Conference standings
	Conf.			Overall
Team	W		L	W		L
No. 1 North Dakota State $^	7	–	1	14	–	1
No. 14 South Dakota State ^	6	–	2	9	–	4
No. 8 Illinois State ^	5	–	3	9	–	4
Indiana State	5	–	3	7	–	4
Southern Illinois	5	–	3	6	–	5
Youngstown State	4	–	4	7	–	4
Northern Iowa	4	–	4	5	–	6
Missouri State	3	–	5	3	–	8
Western Illinois	1	–	7	3	–	8
South Dakota	0	–	8	1	–	10
$ – Conference champion; ^ – FCS playoff participant; Rankings from The Sports Network poll

The 2012 North Dakota State Bison football team represented North Dakota State University in the 2012 NCAA Division I FCS football season. They were led by tenth-year head coach Craig Bohl and played their home games at the Fargodome in Fargo, North Dakota. North Dakota State entered the season as the defending NCAA Division I Football and Missouri Valley Football Conference (MVFC) champions. In 2012, the Bison won their second straight MVFC title posting, a 7–1 conference record and 10–1 overall mark in the regular season. In the FCS playoffs they defeated South Dakota State, Wofford, Georgia Southern, and Sam Houston State to finish the season 14–1 and win their second consecutive national title.

== Schedule ==
Date	Time	Opponent	Rank	Site	TV	Result	Attendance	Source
September 1	6:00 pm	Robert Morris*	No. 2	Fargodome; Fargo, ND	NBC ND/ESPN3	W 52–0	18,769	
September 8	6:00 pm	at Colorado State*	No. 2	Hughes Stadium; Fort Collins, CO	NBC ND/KTVD	W 22–7	23,567	
September 22	3:00 pm	Prairie View A&M*	No. 1	Fargodome; Fargo, ND	NBC ND/ESPN3	W 66–7	18,623	
September 29	6:00 pm	at No. 14 Northern Iowa	No. 1	UNI-Dome; Cedar Falls, IA	KVLY/Panther Sports Network/ KWWL-TV	W 33–21	16,008	
October 6	1:00 pm	No. 3 Youngstown State^{†}	No. 1	Fargodome; Fargo, ND	NBC ND/ESPN3/ MVFC TV	W 48–7	19,065	
October 13	3:00 pm	Indiana State	No. 1	Fargodome; Fargo, ND	NBC ND/ESPN3	L 14–17	18,164	
October 20	6:00 pm	at South Dakota	No. 4	Howard Wood Field; Sioux Falls, SD	Midco SN	W 54–0	9,269	
October 27	3:00 pm	Southern Illinois	No. 3	Fargodome; Fargo, ND (Harvest Bowl)	NBC ND/FCS	W 23–17	18,066	
November 3	1:00 pm	at Missouri State	No. 1	Plaster Sports Complex; Springfield, MO	NBC ND/Mediacom	W 21–17	6,253	
November 10	3:00 pm	No. 16 South Dakota State	No. 1	Fargodome; Fargo, ND (Dakota Marker)	NBC ND/FCS	W 20–17	18,721	
November 17	1:00 pm	at No. 11 Illinois State	No. 1	Hancock Stadium; Normal, IL	NBC ND	W 38–20	6,793	
December 1	3:00 pm	No. 19 South Dakota State*	No. 1	Fargodome; Fargo, ND (FCS Playoffs Second Round)	ESPN3	W 28–3	18,482	
December 8	2:00 pm	No. 9 Wofford*	No. 1	Fargodome; Fargo, ND (FCS Playoffs Quarterfinals)	ESPN3	W 14–7	18,267	
December 14	7:00 pm	No. 6 Georgia Southern*	No. 1	Fargodome; Fargo, ND (FCS Playoffs Semifinals)	ESPN2	W 23–20	18,484	
January 5	12:00 pm	vs. No. 5 Sam Houston State*	No. 1	FC Dallas Stadium; Frisco, TX (FCS Playoffs National Championship Game)	ESPN2	W 39–13	21,411	
*Non-conference game; ^{†}Homecoming; Rankings from The Sports Network Poll released prior to the game; All times are in Central time

== Rankings ==
Ranking movements Legend: ██ Increase in ranking ██ Decrease in ranking
	Week																
Poll	Pre	1	2	3	4	5	6	7	8	9	10	11	12	13	14	15	Final
Sports Network	2	2	1	1	1	1	1	4	3	1	1	1	1	1	1	1	1
Coaches	1	1	1	1	1	1	1	4	3	2	1	1	1	1	1	1	1

== Coaching staff ==
Name	Position	Year at North Dakota State	Alma mater (year)
Craig Bohl	Head coach	10th	Nebraska (1982)
Brent Vigen	Offensive coordinator Quarterbacks	15th	North Dakota State (1998)
Chris Klieman	Defensive coordinator Defensive backs	2nd	Northern Iowa (1990)
Kenni Burns	Recruiting coordinator Wide receivers coach	3rd	Indiana (2006)
A. J. Cooper	Defensive ends coach	7th	North Dakota State (2006)
Scott Fuchs	Offensive line	4th	North Dakota State (1995)
Nick Goeser	Defensive tackles coach	3rd	Wisconsin–Eau Claire (2003)
Tim Polasek	Special teams coordinator Tight ends Fullbacks Backs	6th	Concordia (WI) (2002)
Steve Stanard	Linebackers	1st	Nebraska (1989)
Gordie Haug	Offensive assistant	1st	Bemidji State (2009)
John Richardson	Defensive assistant	2nd	North Dakota State (2010)
