= 2007 Missouri State Bears football team =

American college football season

2007 Missouri State Bears football
- Conference: Gateway Football Conference
- Record: 6–5 (2–4 GFC)
- Head coach: Terry Allen (2nd season)
- Offensive coordinator: Rob Christophel (2nd season)
- Defensive coordinator: D. J. Vokolek (2nd season)
- Captains: Marcus Colbert; Gerald Davis; Jeron Poole; David Tillman
- Home stadium: Plaster Sports Complex

2007 Gateway Football Conference standings
	Conf.			Overall
Team	W		L	W		L
No. 4 Northern Iowa $^	6	–	0	12	–	1
No. 3 Southern Illinois ^	5	–	1	12	–	2
No. 16 Youngstown State	3	–	3	7	–	4
Western Illinois	3	–	3	6	–	5
Missouri State	2	–	4	6	–	5
Illinois State	2	–	4	4	–	7
Indiana State	0	–	6	0	–	11
$ – Conference champion; ^ – FCS playoff participant; Rankings from The Sports Network poll

The 2007 Missouri State Bears football team represented Missouri State University as a member of the Gateway Football Conference (GFC) during the 2007 NCAA Division I FCS football season. Led by second-year head coach Terry Allen, the Bears compiled an overall record of 6–5, with a mark of 2–4 in conference play, and finished tied for fifth in the GFC.

== Schedule ==
Date	Opponent	Site	Result	Attendance	Source
August 30	Missouri–Rolla*	Plaster Sports Complex; Springfield, MO	W 62–17	11,062	
September 6	at No. 20 Tennessee–Martin*	Graham Stadium; Martin, TN	W 51–44		
September 15	at Kansas State*	Bill Snyder Family Football Stadium; Manhattan, KS	L 10–61	46,825	
September 22	Central Arkansas*	Plaster Sports Complex; Springfield, MO	W 42–38	12,084	
September 29	at No. 10 Youngstown State	Stambaugh Stadium; Youngstown, OH	L 21–49		
October 6	No. 23 Illinois State	Plaster Sports Complex; Springfield, MO	W 58–41	11,058	
October 13	at No. 19 Western Illinois	Hanson Field; Macomb, IL	L 10–31	10,011	
October 20	at No. 9 Southern Illinois	McAndrew Stadium; Carbondale, IL	L 10–45	12,064	
October 27	Indiana State	Plaster Sports Complex; Springfield, MO	W 63–7	12,032	
November 3	No. 1 Northern Iowa	Plaster Sports Complex; Springfield, MO	L 17–38	10,590	
November 10	Southeast Missouri State*	Plaster Sports Complex; Springfield, MO	W 55–17		
*Non-conference game; Rankings from The Sports Network Poll released prior to the game
