= Mark Hendrickson (American football) =

American football coach

Biographical details
- Born: Richland, Iowa, U.S.

Playing career
- 1976–1979: Northern Iowa
- Position: Wide receiver

Coaching career (HC unless noted)
- 1983–1986: Georgia Tech (RB/WR)
- 1987–1989: Georgia Tech (LC/ST)
- 1990–1991: Georgia Tech (TE)
- 1992: Iowa (assistant)
- 1993: Southeast Missouri State (OC)
- 1994–1998: Iowa (ST)
- 1999–2007: Western Illinois (OC)
- 2008–2012: Western Illinois
- 2019–2021: Kansas Wesleyan (RB/WR)

Head coaching record
- Overall: 18–32
- Tournaments: 1–1 (NCAA D-I playoffs)

Mark Hendrickson is an American football coach and former player with the University of Northern Iowa. He was the head football coach at the Western Illinois University from 2008 until his firing on November 20, 2012.

== Coaching career ==
Hendrickson's first coaching job was at Georgia Tech as an assistant to Bill Curry in 1983. As part of the Georgia Tech coaching staff, Hendrickson won a national championship in 1990. In 1992, he was hired at the University of Iowa as an assistant to Hayden Fry. Following a brief stint at Southeast Missouri State University, he returned to Iowa, and was shortly thereafter hired as an assistant at Western Illinois. Hendrickson served as offensive coordinator from 1999 to 2007. While part of the Leatherneck coaching staff, WIU appeared in the playoffs in 2000, 2002, and 2003. He was named acting head coach in 2008, and later head coach in 2009. Hendrickson led the Leathernecks to the Division I FCS playoffs in 2010, where they won over Coastal Carolina and lost to #2 Appalachian State. The 2010 Leathernecks ended the 2010 season #17 in the Sports Network final poll and #20 in the FCS Coaches poll. Hendrickson finished second in the final voting for the 2010 Eddie Robinson Award, awarded by The Sports Network.

In the spring of 2019, Hendrickson joined his son's (Myers Hendrickson) staff at Kansas Wesleyan coaching the running backs and wide receivers.

== Personal life ==
Hendrickson and his wife, Ericka, have three children. His son, Myers Hendrickson, was the head football coach at Western Illinois from 2022 to 2023.

== Head coaching record ==
Year	Team	Overall	Conference	Standing	Bowl/playoffs	TSN^{#}	FCS^{°}
Western Illinois Leathernecks (Missouri Valley Football Conference) (2008–2012)
2008	Western Illinois	5–2 (Note: Hendrickson served as acting head coach for the first seven games of the 2008 season before Don Patterson returned as head coach for the final four games. Western Illinois finished the year 6–5 overall with a 4–4 conference mark, tying for fourth place in the Missouri Valley Football Conference.)	3–1				
2009	Western Illinois	0–8 (Note: Don Patterson served as head coach for the first three games, all non-conference contests, of the season before resigning. Hendrickson replaced him as acting head coach for the final eight games. Western Illinois finished the year 1–10 overall.)	0–8	9th			
2010	Western Illinois	8–5	5–3	2nd	L NCAA Division I Second Round	17	20
2011	Western Illinois	2–9	1–7	9th			
2012	Western Illinois	3–8	1–7	9th			
Western Illinois:		18–32	10–26				
Total:		18–32					
^{#}Rankings from final The Sports Network poll.; ^{°}Rankings from final FCS Coaches poll.
