= Cameron Siskowic =

American gridiron football player (born 1984)

Profile
- Position: Linebacker

Personal information
- Born: April 10, 1984 (age 42); San Diego, California, U.S.
- Listed height: 6 ft 2 in (1.88 m)
- Listed weight: 225 lb (102 kg)

Career information
- College: Illinois State
- NFL draft: 2007: undrafted

Career history
- Cincinnati Bengals (2007)*; Minnesota Vikings (2007); Hamilton Tiger-Cats (2008–2009)
- * Offseason or practice squad member only

Awards and highlights
- GFC Player of the Year (2006); Third-team All-American (2005); 2× First-team All-GFC (2005–2006)
- Stats at CFL.ca (archive)

Cameron Siskowic (born April 10, 1984) is an American former football player. He played college football for the Illinois State Redbirds and was signed by the Cincinnati Bengals as an undrafted free agent in 2006.

Siskowic was also a member of the Minnesota Vikings and Hamilton Tiger-Cats.
