= Memorial Stadium (Terre Haute, Indiana) =

Stadium in Terre Haute

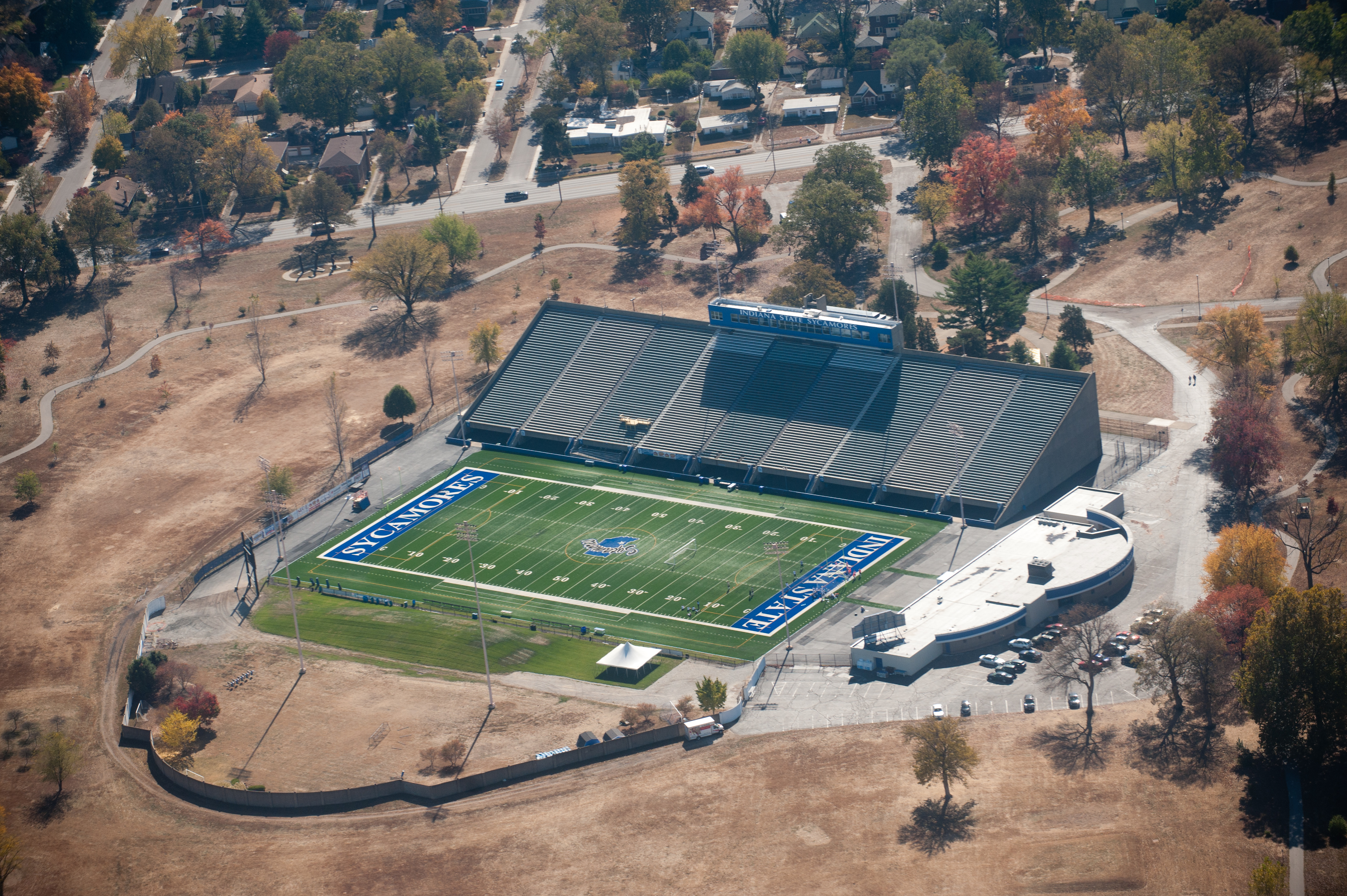
- Interactive map of Memorial Stadium
- Location: 3300 Wabash Avenue; Terre Haute, IN 47803
- Coordinates: 39°28′29″N 87°22′1″W
- Owner: Indiana State University
- Operator: Indiana State University
- Capacity: 12,764 (1996–present); 20,500 (1970–1995); 14,000 (1967–1969); 16,000 (1924–1966)
- Surface: FieldTurf

Construction
- Groundbreaking: October 1, 1922
- Opened: November 27, 1924
- Renovated: 1967
- Cost: $450,000 (1922) (equal to $8,453,883 today)
- Architect: Shourds–Stoner Co.
- General contractor: North Raffin Construction Co.

Tenant
- Indiana State Sycamores (NCAA) (1967–present)

Memorial Stadium is the current home of the Indiana State Sycamores football and soccer section in Terre Haute, Indiana, United States. The stadium was renovated between 1967 and 1969; it was built to host professional minor league baseball; the Indiana State football team began playing there in 1949.

== Memorial Stadium (1924–1967) ==
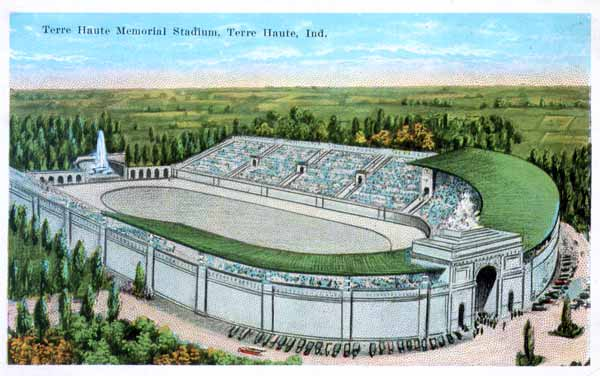
1924 postcard of Memorial Stadium

Constructed in 1923–1924 by the City of Terre Haute to seat approximately 16,000 people. The stadium and its grounds were used for minor league baseball, semi-pro, high school and college football and baseball, professional boxing, circuses, fireworks exhibitions, ice skating and miscellaneous conventions and other events.

The stadium was officially dedicated on May 4, 1925, and was universally hailed as the nation's finest minor league baseball stadium. Baseball commissioner Kenesaw Mountain Landis was present to throw out the first pitch of the season opening game between Terre Haute and the Peoria Tractors. The facility was first home to the Terre Haute Tots, a minor league team in the Three-I League; a Class B team equivalent of today's Class A baseball. Late, the ballpark hosted the Terre Haute Phillies, a farm club of the Philadelphia Phillies, and the Terre Haute Huts, which had a working agreement with the Detroit Tigers. Terre Haute's long association (since 1883) with professional baseball ended on July 3, 1956.

== Memorial Stadium 1968–present ==
In 1967, Indiana State University became the first university in the world to own and operate an outdoor artificial playing surface. The stadium, except for its outside wall and memorial arch, was razed in 1968–1969, and converted to a football stadium. The three-part renovation project included: the reorientation of the playing field from a north–south direction to its present east–west configuration; the installation of Astroturf; and the construction of some 4,500 bleacher seats on the north side of the field as well as the rebuilding of seats on the south side. The original arch still remains from the original structure. However, the bleacher seats, installed in 1967, were removed in the summer of 1996 and replaced by a landscaped hill which serves as a general admission section and a site for pregame tailgating for Sycamore fans. As a result, it has little resemblance to the majestic amphitheater constructed in the early Twenties. The field was upgraded in 2009 with a new FieldTurf playing surface, at a cost of $750,000.

Memorial Stadium, which has a current capacity of 12,764, also hosts the annual High School football game (previously the homecoming game) between Terre Haute rivals North-South as they play for the Victory Bell. The record attendance (18,293) at the stadium was set Homecoming Weekend, October 10, 1980; the Sycamores defeated Southern Illinois 19–6.

There are tentative plans to construct a new multi-purpose stadium on the Indiana State campus, three miles to the west. Memorial Stadium would likely then be razed, with the exception of the last portion of the original Memorial Stadium, the Arch.

In June 2010, two practice fields were constructed to alleviate scheduling conflicts for practices and provide additional fields for Terre Haute-area youth football and high school programs.

== See also ==
- Illinois–Indiana–Iowa League
- List of NCAA Division I FCS football stadiums
