= 2022 Stephen F. Austin Lumberjacks football team =

American college football season

2022 Stephen F. Austin Lumberjacks football

WAC co-champion
- Conference: Western Athletic Conference
- Record: 6–5 (3–1 WAC)
- Head coach: Colby Carthel (4th season)
- Offensive coordinator: Matt Storm (4th season)
- Offensive scheme: Spread
- Defensive coordinator: Joe Cauthen (1st season)
- Base defense: 4–2–5
- Home stadium: Homer Bryce Stadium

2022 WAC–ASUN Challenge football standings
	Conf.			Overall
Team	W		L	W		L
Eastern Kentucky $^	4	–	1	7	–	5
Central Arkansas	4	–	1	5	–	6
Austin Peay	3	–	1	7	–	4
Stephen F. Austin	2	–	1	6	–	5
Abilene Christian	1	–	1	7	–	4
Kennesaw State	1	–	3	5	–	6
Southern Utah	0	–	3	5	–	6
North Alabama	0	–	4	1	–	10
$ – Conference champion; ^ – FCS playoff participant; Rankings from STATS Poll

2022 Western Athletic Conference football standings
	Conf.			Overall
Team	W		L	W		L
Stephen F. Austin +	3	–	1	6	–	5
Abilene Christian +	3	–	1	7	–	4
Sam Houston *	3	–	2	5	–	4
Utah Tech *	2	–	2	4	–	7
Tarleton State *	1	–	3	6	–	5
Southern Utah	1	–	3	5	–	6
+ – Conference co-champions; * Note: Sam Houston ineligible for WAC championship and FCS postseason play due to start of transition to FBS; Tarleton and Utah Tech ineligible for FCS postseason play due to transition from NCAA Division II.; Rankings from STATS Poll

The 2022 Stephen F. Austin Lumberjacks football team represented Stephen F. Austin State University in the 2022 NCAA Division I FCS football season. The Lumberjacks played their home games at Homer Bryce Stadium in Nacogdoches, Texas, and competed in the Western Athletic Conference (WAC). They were led by fourth-year head coach Colby Carthel.

== Schedule ==
Stephen F. Austin's athletics department announced the 2022 football schedule on February 9, 2022.

Date	Time	Opponent	Rank	Site	TV	Result	Attendance
August 27	2:30 p.m.	vs. Jacksonville State*	No. 10	Cramton Bowl; Montgomery, AL (FCS Kickoff)	ESPN	L 17–42	5,235
September 3	6:00 p.m.	at Alcorn State*	No. 10	Casem-Spinks Stadium; Lorman, MS	Braves All-Access	W 31–27	6,872
September 10	6:00 p.m.	at Louisiana Tech*	No. 18	Joe Aillet Stadium; Ruston, LA	ESPN3	L 17–52	16,094
September 24	6:00 p.m.	Warner*	No. 23	Homer Bryce Stadium; Nacogdoches, TX	ESPN+	W 98–0	12,590
October 1	2:30 p.m.	vs. Sam Houston		NRG Stadium; Houston, TX (Battle of the Piney Woods)	ESPN+	L 16–17	26,826
October 8	6:00 p.m.	Abilene Christian*		Homer Bryce Stadium; Nacogdoches, TX	ESPN3	W 41–38	7,224
October 15	6:00 p.m.	Tarleton State		Homer Bryce Stadium; Nacogdoches, TX	ESPN3	W 41–24	7,035
October 22	2:00 p.m.	at Southern Utah		Eccles Coliseum; Cedar City, UT	ESPN+	W 41–38	3,268
October 29	4:00 p.m.	Utah Tech^{†}		Homer Bryce Stadium; Nacogdoches, TX	ESPN+	L 44–47	7,156
November 12	4:00 p.m.	Central Arkansas*		Homer Bryce Stadium; Nacogdoches, TX	ESPN+	L 7–34	7,456
November 19	2:30 p.m.	at Abilene Christian		Anthony Field at Wildcat Stadium; Abilene, TX	ESPN+	W 24–21	
*Non-conference game; ^{†}Homecoming; Rankings from STATS Poll released prior to the game; All times are in Central time
