= 2022 North Alabama Lions football team =

American college football season

2022 North Alabama Lions football
- Conference: ASUN Conference
- Record: 1–10 (0–5 ASUN)
- Head coach: Chris Willis (6th season; Games 1–8); Ryan Held (Games 9–11)
- Offensive coordinator: Ryan Held (1st season)
- Defensive coordinator: Steadman Campbell (5th season)
- Home stadium: Braly Municipal Stadium

2022 ASUN Conference football standings
	Conf.			Overall
Team	W		L	W		L
Jacksonville State*	5	–	0	9	–	2
Austin Peay +	3	–	2	7	–	4
Eastern Kentucky +^	3	–	2	7	–	5
Central Arkansas +	3	–	2	5	–	6
Kennesaw State	1	–	4	5	–	6
North Alabama	0	–	5	1	–	10
+ – Conference co-champions; ^ – FCS playoff participant; Note: Jacksonville State ineligible for postseason play and ASUN title due to start of transition to FBS.; Rankings from STATS Poll

2022 WAC–ASUN Challenge football standings
	Conf.			Overall
Team	W		L	W		L
Eastern Kentucky $^	4	–	1	7	–	5
Central Arkansas	4	–	1	5	–	6
Austin Peay	3	–	1	7	–	4
Stephen F. Austin	2	–	1	6	–	5
Abilene Christian	1	–	1	7	–	4
Kennesaw State	1	–	3	5	–	6
Southern Utah	0	–	3	5	–	6
North Alabama	0	–	4	1	–	10
$ – Conference champion; ^ – FCS playoff participant; Rankings from STATS Poll

The 2022 North Alabama Lions football team represented the University of North Alabama during the 2022 NCAA Division I FCS football season. The Lions played their home games at the Braly Municipal Stadium in Florence, Alabama. The team was coached by sixth-year head coach Chris Willis.

== Schedule ==
Date	Time	Opponent	Site	TV	Result	Attendance
September 1	5:00 p.m.	at Indiana State*	Memorial Stadium; Terre Haute, IN	ESPN+	L 14–17 ^{OT}	4,851
September 10	6:00 p.m.	Virginia–Wise*	Braly Municipal Stadium; Florence, AL	ESPN+	W 49–17	9,421
September 17	5:00 p.m.	at No. 10 Chattanooga*	Finley Stadium; Chattanooga, TN		L 14–41	10,254
September 24	6:00 p.m.	Tarleton State*^{†}	Braly Municipal Stadium; Florence, AL	ESPN+	L 28–43	10,039
October 8	5:00 p.m.	at Kennesaw State	Fifth Third Bank Stadium; Kennesaw, GA	ESPN+	L 34–40 ^{2OT}	4,505
October 15	6:00 p.m.	vs. Jacksonville State	Toyota Field; Madison, AL	ESPN+	L 31–47	10,124
October 22	2:00 p.m.	at Eastern Kentucky	Roy Kidd Stadium; Richmond, KY	ESPN+	L 53–56	15,244
October 29	4:00 p.m.	at Central Arkansas	Estes Stadium; Conway, AR	ESPN+	L 29–64	4,253
November 5	4:00 p.m.	Austin Peay	Braly Municipal Stadium; Florence, AL	ESPN+	L 35–38	5,235
November 12	4:00 p.m.	Tennessee Tech*	Braly Municipal Stadium; Florence, AL	ESPN+	L 27–35	6,132
November 19	1:00 p.m.	at Memphis*	Simmons Bank Liberty Stadium; Memphis, TN	ESPN+	L 0–59	24,154
*Non-conference game; ^{†}Homecoming; Rankings from STATS Poll released prior to the game; All times are in Central time

== Game summaries ==
=== at Indiana State ===
Team	1	2	3	4	OT	Total
North Alabama	7	0	7	0	0	14
• Indiana State	3	3	0	8	3	17

- Date: September 1
- Location: Memorial Stadium
- Game start: 6:02 p.m.
- Game attendance: 4,851
- Game weather: Sunny
- Referee: Rick Warne
- Television network: ESPN+

Statistics	INS	UNA
First downs	11	17
Total yards	276	156
Rushing yards	135	8
Passing yards	141	148
Turnovers	1	2
Time of possession	24:25	35:35

Team	Category	Player	Statistics
INS	Passing	Gavin Screws	16/30, 141 yards, 1 TD, 2 INT's
INS	Rushing	Tee Hodge	20 carries, 78 yards
INS	Receiving	Kevin Barnett	5 receptions, 38 yards
UNA	Passing	Noah Walters	6/13, 64 yards, 1 TD, 1 INT
UNA	Rushing	ShunDerrick Powell	20 carries, 80 yards, 1 TD
UNA	Receiving	Kobe Warden	2 receptions, 32 yards

=== Virginia-Wise ===
Team	1	2	3	4	Total
Virginia-Wise	14	3	0	0	17
• North Alabama	0	21	14	14	49

- Date: September 10
- Location: Braly Stadium
- Game start: 6:01 p.m.
- Game attendance: 9,421
- Game weather: 75, Cloudy, Wind W @ 4 mph
- Referee: Shawn Purdy
- Television network: ESPN+

Statistics	UVW	UNA
First downs	17	17
Total yards	339	465
Rushing yards	67	369
Passing yards	272	96
Turnovers	3	0
Time of possession	35:09	24:51

Team	Category	Player	Statistics
UVW	Passing	Lendon Redwine	25/36, 264 yards, 1 TD, 1 INT
UVW	Rushing	Jeavon Gillespie	8 carries, 63 yards
UVW	Receiving	Tyler Kirkless	4 receptions, 95 yards, 1 TD
UNA	Passing	Noah Walters	7/21, 96 yards, 1 TD
UNA	Rushing	ShunDerrick Powell	20 carries, 251 yards, 4 TD's
UNA	Receiving	E.J. Rogers	2 receptions, 40 yards

=== at No. 10 Chattanooga ===
Team	1	2	3	4	Total
North Alabama	0	14	0	0	14
• No. 10 Chattanooga	7	20	0	14	41

- Date: September 17
- Location: Finley Stadium
- Game start: 6:02 p.m.
- Game attendance: 10,254
- Game weather: 81, Cloudy, Wind SE @ 6 mph
- Referee: Michael Farmer Jr
- Television network: ESPN+

Statistics	UTC	UNA
First downs	25	15
Total yards	469	310
Rushing yards	166	60
Passing yards	303	250
Turnovers	1	1
Time of possession	35:11	24:49

Team	Category	Player	Statistics
UTC	Passing	Preston Hutchinson	22/31, 303 yards, 3 TD, 1 INT
UTC	Rushing	Aliym Ford	21 carries, 96 yards
UTC	Receiving	Sam Phillips	5 receptions, 96 yards
UNA	Passing	Noah Walters	18/27, 250 yards, 2 TD's, 1 INT
UNA	Rushing	ShunDerrick Powell	10 carries, 33 yards
UNA	Receiving	Takairee Kenebrew	3 receptions, 107 yards, 1 TD

=== Tarleton State ===
	1	2	3	4	Total
Texans	6	14	14	9	43
Lions	14	7	0	7	28

=== At Kennesaw State ===
	1	2	3	4	OT	2OT	Total
Lions	3	3	7	14	7	0	34
Owls	7	3	7	10	7	6	40

=== vs Jacksonville State ===
	1	2	3	4	Total
Gamecocks	21	10	10	6	47
Lions	0	14	14	3	31

=== At Eastern Kentucky ===
	1	2	3	4	Total
Lions	14	7	14	18	53
Colonels	7	28	7	14	56

=== At Central Arkansas ===
North Alabama Lions (1-6) vs Central Arkansas Bears (3-4)

Quarter	1	2	3	4	Total
Lions	0	7	7	15	29
Bears	12	21	21	10	64

at Estes Stadium, Conway, AR

- Date: October 29th
- Game time: 4:00 pm
- Game weather: 58 °F (14 °C) • Weather: Cloudy
- Game attendance: 4,253
- Referee: Brad Carrell
- TV: ESPN+

Statistics	North Alabama	Central Arkansas
First downs	17	23
Plays–yards	70-392	65-733
Rushes–yards	278	456
Passing yards	114	277
Passing: comp–att–int	10-28-1	15-24-0
Time of possession	29:39	30:21

Team	Category	Player	Statistics
North Alabama	Passing	Noah Walters	9/26, 108 yards, 1 TD, 1 INT
North Alabama	Rushing	ShunDerrick Powell	22 carries, 159 yards, 2 TD
North Alabama	Receiving	Cortez Hall	2 receptions, 34 yards
Central Arkansas	Passing	Will McElvain	15/24, 277 yards, 2 TD
Central Arkansas	Rushing	Darius Hale	19 carries, 255 yards, 2 TD
Central Arkansas	Receiving	Myles Butler	2 receptions, 117 yards, 1 TD

Scoring summary

Quarter	Time	Drive			Team	Scoring information	Score	
Quarter	Time	Plays	Yards	TOP	Team	Scoring information	North Alabama	Central Arkansas
							0	0
"TOP" = time of possession. For other American football terms, see Glossary of American football.							0	0

=== Austin Peay ===
Austin Peay Governors (5-3) vs North Alabama Lions (1-7)

Quarter	1	2	3	4	Total
Governors	7	17	7	7	38
Lions	14	0	7	14	35

at Braly Municipal Stadium, Florence, AL

- Date: November 5th
- Game time: 4:00 pm
- Game weather: 66 °F (19 °C) • Weather: Cloudy • Wind: NW 2 MPH
- Game attendance: 5,235
- Referee: Doug Mercer
- TV: ESPN+

Statistics	Austin Peay	North Alabama
First downs	24	22
Plays–yards	73-544	80-463
Rushes–yards	218	260
Passing yards	326	203
Passing: comp–att–int	19-31-0	20-35-1
Time of possession	23:47	36:13

Team	Category	Player	Statistics
Austin Peay	Passing	Mike DiLiello	19/31, 326 yards, 3 TD
Austin Peay	Rushing	CJ Evans Jr.	15 carries, 87 yards, 1 TD
Austin Peay	Receiving	Drae McCray	5 receptions, 106 yards, 1 TD
North Alabama	Passing	Noah Walters	20/35, 203 yards, 2 TD, 1 INT
North Alabama	Rushing	ShunDerrick Powell	23 carries, 207 yards, 2 TD
North Alabama	Receiving	Takairee Kenebrew	7 receptions, 78 yards, 1 TD

Scoring summary

Quarter	Time	Drive			Team	Scoring information	Score	
Quarter	Time	Plays	Yards	TOP	Team	Scoring information	Austin Peay	North Alabama
							0	0
"TOP" = time of possession. For other American football terms, see Glossary of American football.							0	0

=== Tennessee Tech ===
Tennessee Tech Golden Eagles (3-6) vs North Alabama Lions (1-8)

Quarter	1	2	3	4	Total
Golden Eagles	7	14	14	0	35
Lions	0	17	7	3	27

at Braly Municipal Stadium, Florence, AL

- Date: November 12th
- Game time: 4:00 pm
- Game weather: 38 °F (3 °C) • Weather: Cloudy • Wind: SE 11 MPH
- Game attendance: 6,132
- Referee: Brad Carrell
- TV: ESPN+

Statistics	Tennessee Tech	North Alabama
First downs	24	26
Plays–yards	56-454	79-505
Rushes–yards	268	172
Passing yards	186	333
Passing: comp–att–int	15-22-0	21-36-0
Time of possession	28:56	31:04

Team	Category	Player	Statistics
Tennessee Tech	Passing	Jeremiah Oatsvall	14/21, 183 yards, 1 TD
Tennessee Tech	Rushing	Jayvian Allen	9 carries, 70 yards
Tennessee Tech	Receiving	Metrius Fleming	4 receptions, 61 yards
North Alabama	Passing	Noah Walters	21/36, 333 yards, 2 TD
North Alabama	Rushing	ShunDerrick Powell	30 carries, 151 yards, 1 TD, 1 fumble
North Alabama	Receiving	Takairee Kenebrew	2 receptions, 77 yards, 1 TD

Scoring summary

Quarter	Time	Drive			Team	Scoring information	Score	
Quarter	Time	Plays	Yards	TOP	Team	Scoring information	Tennessee Tech	North Alabama
							0	0
"TOP" = time of possession. For other American football terms, see Glossary of American football.							0	0

=== At Memphis ===
North Alabama Lions (1-9) vs Memphis Tigers (5-5)

Quarter	1	2	3	4	Total
Lions	0	0	0	0	0
Tigers	14	24	14	7	59

at Simmons Bank Liberty Stadium, Memphis, TN

- Date: November 19th
- Game time: 1:00 pm
- Game weather: 39 °F (4 °C) • Weather: Sunny • Wind: SW 6 MPH
- Game attendance: 24,154
- Referee: Tim Rich
- TV announcers (ESPN+): Ted Emrich, Leger Douzable

Statistics	North Alabama	Memphis
First downs	9	28
Plays–yards	49–124	72–493
Rushes–yards	30–100	43–246
Passing yards	24	247
Passing: comp–att–int	6–19–2	18–29–0
Time of possession	26:18	33:42

Team	Category	Player	Statistics
North Alabama	Passing	Noah Walters	6/19, 24 yards, 2 INT
North Alabama	Rushing	Noah Walters	9 carries, 56 yards
North Alabama	Receiving	Takairee Kenebrew	1 reception, 9 yards
Memphis	Passing	Seth Henigan	14/24, 218 yards, 1 TD
Memphis	Rushing	An'Darius Coffey	14 carries, 83 yards
Memphis	Receiving	Eddie Lewis	3 receptions, 73 yards, 1 TD

Scoring summary

Quarter	Time	Drive			Team	Scoring information	Score	
Quarter	Time	Plays	Yards	TOP	Team	Scoring information	North Alabama	Memphis
							0	0
"TOP" = time of possession. For other American football terms, see Glossary of American football.							0	0
