= 2022 Sam Houston Bearkats football team =

American college football season

2022 Sam Houston Bearkats football
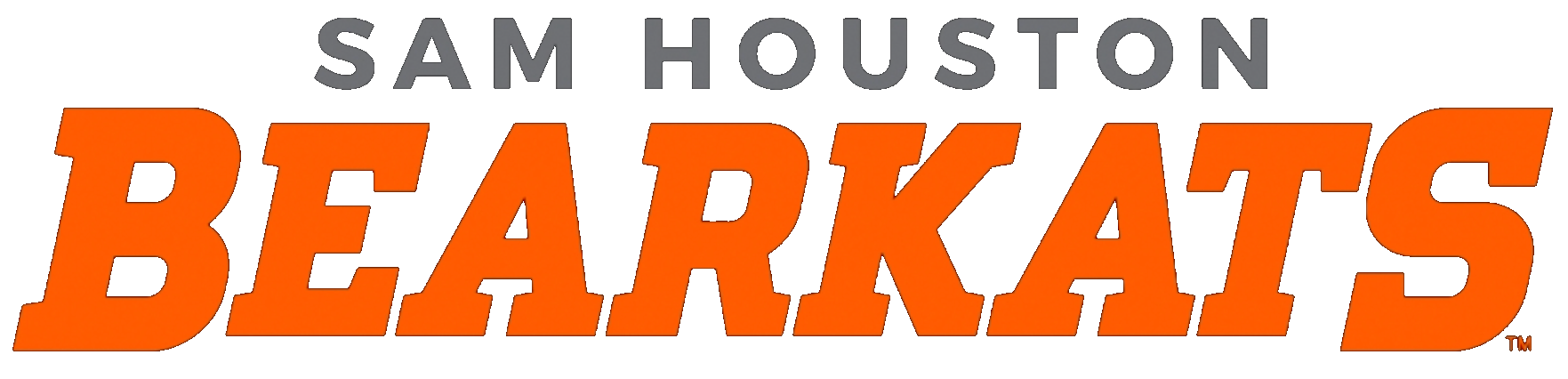
- Conference: Western Athletic Conference
- Record: 5–4 (3–2 WAC)
- Head coach: K. C. Keeler (9th season)
- Offensive coordinator: John Perry (1st season; first five games); Matt Merkens (interim; remainder of season)
- Offensive scheme: Spread
- Co-defensive coordinators: Clayton Carlin (6th season); Joe Morris (2nd season)
- Base defense: 4–2–5
- Home stadium: Bowers Stadium

2022 Western Athletic Conference football standings
	Conf.			Overall
Team	W		L	W		L
Stephen F. Austin +	3	–	1	6	–	5
Abilene Christian +	3	–	1	7	–	4
Sam Houston *	3	–	2	5	–	4
Utah Tech *	2	–	2	4	–	7
Tarleton State *	1	–	3	6	–	5
Southern Utah	1	–	3	5	–	6
+ – Conference co-champions; * Note: Sam Houston ineligible for WAC championship and FCS postseason play due to start of transition to FBS; Tarleton and Utah Tech ineligible for FCS postseason play due to transition from NCAA Division II.; Rankings from STATS Poll

The 2022 Sam Houston Bearkats football team represented Sam Houston State University as a member of the Western Athletic Conference (WAC) during the 2022 NCAA Division I FCS football season. Led by ninth-year head coach K. C. Keeler, the Bearkats compiled an overall record of 5–4. Sam Houston played home games at Bowers Stadium in Huntsville, Texas.

The 2022 season was the program's last season as a member of the WAC as the Bearkats joined Conference USA in 2023.

== Offseason ==
=== Transfers ===
==== Outgoing ====
Player	Position	Destination
Kamren Washington	DL	Memphis
Ramon Jefferson	RB	Kentucky
Princeton Pines	IOL	Tulane
John Mathis	DL	Incarnate Word
Eleasah Anderson	OT	Western Michigan

==== Incoming ====
Player	Position	Previous Team
Al'Vonte Woodard	WR	Texas
Chris Murray	DL	TCU
Jordan Yates	QB	Georgia Tech
Toby Ndukwe	EDGE	SMU
Lloyd Murray Jr.	DL	Colorado
Simeon Evans	QB	Army
Ellison Hubbard	DL	Colorado State
B.J. Foster	S	Texas

== Roster ==
2022 Sam Houston Bearkats football team roster
Players
Coaches
Offense

Pos.	#	Name	Class
WR	2	Ife Adeyi	Jr
QB	3	Simeon Evans	So
WR	4	Al'vonte Woodard	Jr
QB	5	Keegan Shoemaker	Jr
WR	6	Noah Smith	Jr
RB	7	Dezmon Jackson	GS
QB	8	Sylas Gomez	Fr
WR	9	Cody Chrest	GS
QB	10	Trapper Pannell	So
QB	11	Tristan Brady	Fr
QB	13	Jordan Yates	So
WR	15	Tony Williams	Sr
WR	17	KeSean Raven	Fr
TE	18	Jacob Kainer	Jr
RB	21	Zach Hrbacek	Fr
RB	22	Charles Crawford III	Fr
WR	23	Adrian Murdaugh	Fr
RB	26	Jalen Washington	Fr
TE	27	Dalton Meyer	Jr
RB	29	Jacob Berry	Sr
RB	32	Weston Stephens	So
RB	36	Garret Hagler	Fr
TE	37	Jax Sherrard	GS
RB	38	Jevin Murray	So
TE	44	Braeden Howell	Fr
OL	51	Jalen North	So
OL	52	D'Ary Patton	Fr
OL	57	Ethan Hagler	Jr
OL	61	Noah Barboza	Jr
OL	62	Anthony Turrubiartes	Sr
OL	63	Ethan Vazquez	Fr
OL	65	Daniel Melendez	Jr
OL	68	Trevor Jaks	Fr
OL	69	Seth Kohlscheen	So
OL	70	Jordan Boatman	GS
OL	71	James Dawn II	Fr
OL	72	Keaton Altman	Fr
OL	73	Moses Johnson	Sr
OL	74	Khalil Miller	Jr
OL	75	Wade Willet	GS
OL	76	CJ Marsh	Fr
OL	77	Jihad Lateef	Fr
OL	78	Orion Irving	Fr
WR	80	Shane Johnson	Fr
WR	81	Derrick Rose	So
WR	82	Chris Hicks Jr.	Fr
WR	83	Red Jones	So
WR	84	Tyler Bailey	Fr
WR	85	Jaxson Chrest	Fr
TE	86	Thomas Jewett	Fr
WR	87	Jay Rockwell	Fr
TE	88	Marcus Collins	Fr
TE	89	Elijah Sohn	Jr

Defense

Pos.	#	Name	Class
DB	0	Da'Veawn Armstead	So
LB	1	Trevor Williams	Sr
DB	2	Kameryn Alexander	Jr
DB	3	Trey Smith	Sr
DB	4	Isaiah Downes	Sr
DB	5	Darrel Hawkins-Williams	Jr
LB	6	Trey Fields	So
LB	7	Ysidro Mascorro	So
LB	8	Sincere Jackson	Jr
DB	9	Jordan Morris	Jr
LB	10	Jaylen Phillips	So
DL	11	Chris Murray	Fr
DB	12	Donovan Adkins	So
LB	14	Kavian Gaither	So
DB	16	Daniel North	So
DB	19	Emon Allen	Fr
DB	20	David Fisher	Fr
DB	21	Nick Chrest	Fr
DB	22	Jacobe Chester	Fr
DB	23	Taylen Blaylock	So
DB	24	Tobias Weaver	So
DB	25	BJ Foster	GS
DB	26	RJ Bendert	Fr
DB	27	Savien Arnett	Fr
DB	28	Jaidan Scott	Fr
DB	29	Jadarius Brown	Fr
LB	30	Darien Flynn	So
DB	31	Christian Williams	Fr
DL	33	Markel Perry	Sr
DL	34	Toby Ndukwe	GS
LB	35	Gannon Tullos	Fr
DB	36	Truman Bexley	Fr
DB	38	Quan Williams	Fr
DB	39	Caleb Weaver	Fr
DB	40	Carson Horner	So
DB	42	Elias Escobar	Jr
LB	43	Philip Joest	Fr
DL	44	Briceon Hayes	So
DL	45	Tyler Moore	GS
DL	48	Goodness Nwawuihe	Fr
DL	49	Andrew Edmonson	Fr
LB	50	Trey Mappe	Fr
DL	54	Nick Abengowe	Fr
DL	56	Cameron Plummer	Fr
DL	58	Ca'lub Holloway	Fr
DL	92	Lloyd Murray	So
DL	93	Richard Outland	So
DL	94	Jevon Leon	Jr
DL	95	Trent Ward	Fr
DL	96	Matthew Aribisala	Fr
DL	97	Chris Scott	Jr
DL	98	Ellison Hubbard	GS

Special teams

Pos.	#	Name	Class
K	1	Seth Morgan	So
K, P	34	Keegan Sneedon	Fr
K	39	Reed Honshtein	So
LS	41	Zach Stricker	Fr
K, P	43	Jadon Cardell	Fr
P	46	Nick Bruce	GS
K, P	47	Kaden Morgan	Fr
K, P	49	Christian Pavon	Fr
LS	53	Tanner Boston	So

Head coach

- K. C. Keeler

Coordinators/assistant coaches

- Clayton Carlin – Associate head coach/co-defensive coordinator/safeties
- Joe Morris – Co-defensive coordinator/defensive ends
- Matt Merkens – Tight ends
- Cooper Bassett – Offensive line
- Jared Hensley – Linebackers
- John Johnson – Running backs
- Thomas Rocco – Cornerbacks
- Jacoby Walker – Wide receivers
- Zach Milliet – Special teams analyst
- Clayton Barnes – General manager for football
- Jaylon Bowden – Defensive graduate assistant
- Connor Floden – Offensive graduate assistant

Legend

- (C) Team captain
- (S) Suspended
- (I) Ineligible
- Injured
- Redshirt

Roster

== Schedule ==
Sam Houston and the WAC announced the 2022 football schedule on January 12, 2022.

Date	Time	Opponent	Site	TV	Result	Attendance
September 3	11:00 a.m.	at No. 6 (FBS) Texas A&M*	Kyle Field; College Station, TX	SECN	L 0–31	97,946
September 10	6:00 p.m.	Northern Arizona*	Bowers Stadium; Huntsville, TX	ESPN+	L 3–10	7,117
September 17	6:00 p.m.	Texas A&M–Commerce*	Bowers Stadium; Huntsville, TX	ESPN+	W 27–17	8,675
October 1	2:30 p.m.	vs. Stephen F. Austin	NRG Stadium; Houston, TX (rivalry)	BSSW/ESPN+	W 17–16	26,826
October 15	5:00 p.m.	at No. 23 Eastern Kentucky*	Roy Kidd Stadium; Richmond, KY	ESPN+	W 25–17	13,187
October 22	8:00 p.m.	at Utah Tech	Greater Zion Stadium; St. George, UT	ESPN+	W 18–13	2,719
October 29	6:00 p.m.	at Tarleton State	Memorial Stadium; Stephenville, TX	ESPN+	W 40–21	20,237
November 12	12:00 p.m.	Abilene Christian	Bowers Stadium; Huntsville, TX	ESPN+	L 28–45	7,592
November 19	12:00 p.m.	Southern Utah^{†}	Bowers Stadium; Huntsville, TX	ESPN+/ATTSN	L 7–17	7,059
*Non-conference game; ^{†}Homecoming; Rankings from STATS Poll released prior to the game; All times are in Central time

== Game summaries ==
=== at No. 6 (FBS) Texas A&M ===
Sam Houston Bearkats (0–0) at No. 6 (FBS) Texas A&M Aggies (0–0) – Game summary

Quarter	1	2	3	4	Total
Bearkats	0	0	0	0	0
No. 6 (FBS) Aggies	7	10	7	7	31

at Kyle Field • College Station, Texas

- Date: September 3
- Game time: 11:00 a.m. CDT
- Game weather: Cloudy • Temperature: 81 °F (27 °C) • Wind: N at 4 miles per hour (6.4 km/h)
- Game attendance: 97,946
- Referee: Kyle Olson
- TV announcers (SECN): Dave Neal (play-by-play), Deuce McAllister (analyst), and Andraya Carter (sideline reporter)
- Box score, Recap

Game information

First quarter

- (3:39) TAMU – Yulkeith Brown 66-yard pass from Haynes King, Caden Davis kick (Drive: 5 plays, 77 yards, 2:09; Texas A&M 7–0)

Second quarter

- (4:59) TAMU – Caden Davis 40-yard field goal (Drive: 6 plays, 36 yards, 2:10; Texas A&M 10–0)
- (0:50) TAMU – Ainias Smith 63-yard pass from Haynes King, Caden Davis kick (Drive: 3 plays, 67 yards, 1:16; Texas A&M 17–0)

Third quarter

- (8:52) TAMU – De'Von Achane 1-yard run, Caden Davis kick (Drive: 12 plays, 71 yards, 6:08; Texas A&M 24–0)

Fourth quarter

- (11:10) TAMU – Ainias Smith 43-yard pass from Haynes King, Caden Davis kick (Drive: 9 plays, 89 yards, 4:48; Texas A&M 31–0)

Statistics	SHSU	TAMU
First downs	10	23
Plays–yards	55–198	67–387
Rushes–yards	27–107	32–110
Passing yards	91	387
Passing: comp–att–int	14–28–1	23–35–2
Time of possession	27:37	32:23

Team	Category	Player	Statistics
Sam Houston	Passing	Jordan Yates	14/28, 91 yards, 1 INT
Sam Houston	Rushing	Jordan Yates	14 carries, 60 yards
Sam Houston	Receiving	Noah Smith	4 receptions, 35 yards
Texas A&M	Passing	Haynes King	20/31, 364 yards, 3 TD, 2 INT
Texas A&M	Rushing	De'Von Achane	18 carries, 42 yards, 1 TD
Texas A&M	Receiving	Ainias Smith	6 receptions, 164 yards, 2 TD

=== vs Northern Arizona ===
Northern Arizona Lumberjacks (0–1) vs Sam Houston Bearkats (0–1) – Game summary

Quarter	1	2	3	4	Total
Lumberjacks	0	7	3	0	10
Bearkats	0	3	0	0	3

at Bowers Stadium • Huntsville, Texas

- Date: September 10
- Game time: 7:00 p.m. CDT
- Game weather: Clear • Temperature: 88 °F (31 °C) • Wind: N at 4 miles per hour (6.4 km/h)
- Game attendance: 7,117
- Referee: Matt Jones
- TV announcers (ESPN+/ATTSN): Tom Franklin (play-by-play) and John Harris (analyst)
- Box score, Recap

Game information

First quarter

- No scoring plays

Second quarter

- (11:54) SHSU – Seth Morgan 44-yard field goal (Drive: 15 plays, 70 yards, 7:18; Sam Houston 3–0)
- (2:37) NAU – RJ Martinez 1-yard run, Collin Robbins kick (Drive: 5 plays, 27 yards, 1:00; Northern Arizona 7–3)

Third quarter

- (10:11) NAU – Collin Robbins 19-yard field goal (Drive: 11 plays, 80 yards, 4:43; Northern Arizona 10–3)

Fourth quarter

- No scoring plays

Statistics	NAU	SHSU
First downs	20	15
Plays–yards	77–314	60–252
Rushes–yards	35–59	34–141
Passing yards	255	111
Passing: comp–att–int	28–42–1	13–26–1
Time of possession	33:51	26:09

Team	Category	Player	Statistics
Northern Arizona	Passing	RJ Martinez	27/41, 214 yards, 1 INT
Northern Arizona	Rushing	Kevin Daniels	17 carries, 47 yards
Northern Arizona	Receiving	Hendrix Johnson	8 receptions, 101 yards
Sam Houston	Passing	Jordan Yates	13/26, 111 yards, 1 INT
Sam Houston	Rushing	Jordan Yates	18 carries, 74 yards
Sam Houston	Receiving	Ife Adeyi	5 receptions, 62 yards

=== vs Texas A&M–Commerce ===
Texas A&M–Commerce Lions (1–1) vs Sam Houston Bearkats (0–2) – Game summary

Quarter	1	2	3	4	Total
Lions	0	0	7	10	17
Bearkats	3	7	7	10	27

at Bowers Stadium • Huntsville, Texas

- Date: September 17
- Game time: 6:00 p.m. CDT
- Game weather: Party cloudy • Temperature: 86 °F (30 °C) • Wind: S at 6 miles per hour (9.7 km/h)
- Game attendance: 8,675
- Referee: Marcus Thornton
- TV announcers (ESPN+): Randy McIlvoy (play-by-play) and Shea Walker (analyst)
- Box score, Recap

Game information

First quarter

- (2:53) SHSU – Seth Morgan 40-yard field goal (Drive: 8 plays, 32 yards, 2:42; Sam Houston 3–0)

Second quarter

- (12:10) SHSU – Jordan Yates 6-yard run, Seth Morgan kick (Drive: 8 plays, 44 yards, 3:21; Sam Houston 10–0)

Third quarter

- (10:59) TAMC – Celestin Haba 41-yard interception return, Emmanuel Adagbon kick (Sam Houston 10–7)
- (6:39) SHSU – Cody Chrest 3-yard pass from Keegan Shoemaker, Seth Morgan kick (Drive: 13 plays, 75 yards, 4:20; Sam Houston 17–7)

Fourth quarter

- (11:33) TAMC – Emmanuel Adagbon 22-yard field goal (Drive: 9 plays, 50 yards, 3:50; Sam Houston 17–10)
- (9:31) SHSU – Zach Hrbacek 7-yard run, Seth Morgan kick (Drive: 5 plays, 47 yards, 1:53; Sam Houston 24–10)
- (4:46) SHSU – Seth Morgan 46-yard field goal (Drive: 7 plays, 28 yards, 3:31; Sam Houston 27–10)
- (0:31) TAMC – Spencer Long 1-yard run, Emmanuel Adagbon kick (Drive: 12 plays, 75 yards, 4:15; Sam Houston 27–17)

Statistics	TAMC	SHSU
First downs	14	27
Plays–yards	57–223	74–347
Rushes–yards	32–54	47–246
Passing yards	169	101
Passing: comp–att–int	13–25–1	11–27–1
Time of possession	28:03	31:57

Team	Category	Player	Statistics
Texas A&M–Commerce	Passing	Zadock Dinkelmann	13/25, 169 yards, 1 INT
Texas A&M–Commerce	Rushing	Zadock Dinkelmann	15 carries, 20 yards
Texas A&M–Commerce	Receiving	Andrew Armstrong	7 receptions, 104 yards
Sam Houston	Passing	Jordan Yates	5/14, 63 yards, 1 INT
Sam Houston	Rushing	Zach Hrbacek	19 carries, 131 yards, 1 TD
Sam Houston	Receiving	Cody Chrest	4 receptions, 55 yards, 1 TD

=== vs. Stephen F. Austin (Battle of the Piney Woods) ===
Sam Houston Bearkats (1–2) vs. Stephen F. Austin Lumberjacks (2–2) – Game summary

Quarter	1	2	3	4	Total
Bearkats	0	7	3	7	17
Lumberjacks	3	10	3	0	16

at NRG Stadium • Houston, Texas

- Date: October 1
- Game time: 2:30 p.m. CDT
- Game weather: None (indoor stadium)
- Game attendance: 26,826
- Referee: Jeremee Tate
- TV announcers (ESPN+): Randy McIlvoy (play-by-play), Taylor McHargue (analyst), and Deephi Sidhu (sideline reporter)
- Box score, Recap

Game information

First quarter

- (6:15) SFA – Chris Campos 31-yard field goal (Drive: 6 plays, 52 yards, 3:48; Stephen F. Austin 3–0)

Second quarter

- (14:12) SFA – Moe Wedman 85-yard pass from Trae Self, Chris Campos kick (Drive: 6 plays, 94 yards, 3:34; Stephen F. Austin 10–0)
- (2:46) SFA – Chris Campos 30-yard field goal (Drive: 16 plays, 80 yards, 8:25; Stephen F. Austin 13–0)
- (1:10) SHSU – Noah Smith 7-yard pass from Keegan Shoemaker, Seth Morgan kick (Drive: 1 play, 7 yards, 0:07; Stephen F. Austin 13–7)

Third quarter

- (10:12) SFA – Chris Campos 35-yard field goal (Drive: 10 plays, 66 yards, 4:43; Stephen F. Austin 16–7)
- (7:50) SHSU – Seth Morgan 21-yard field goal (Drive: 6 plays, 55 yards, 2:14; Stephen F. Austin 16–10)

Fourth quarter

- (0:35) SHSU – Dezmon Jackson 1-yard run, Seth Morgan kick (Drive: 11 plays, 78 yards, 2:06; Sam Houston 17–16)

Statistics	SHSU	SFA
First downs	20	17
Plays–yards	71–299	74–397
Rushes–yards	31–111	37–144
Passing yards	188	253
Passing: comp–att–int	14–40–2	19–37–1
Time of possession	24:49	35:11

Team	Category	Player	Statistics
Sam Houston	Passing	Keegan Shoemaker	14/40, 188 yards, 1 TD, 2 INT
Sam Houston	Rushing	Keegan Shoemaker	9 carries, 56 yards
Sam Houston	Receiving	Noah Smith	5 receptions, 71 yards, 1 TD
Stephen F. Austin	Passing	Trae Self	17/34, 239 yards, 1 TD, 1 INT
Stephen F. Austin	Rushing	Jerrell Wimbley	6 carries, 66 yards
Stephen F. Austin	Receiving	Moe Wedman	1 receptions, 85 yards, 1 TD

=== at No. 23 Eastern Kentucky ===
Sam Houston Bearkats (2–2) at No. 23 Eastern Kentucky Colonels (3–2) – Game summary

Quarter	1	2	3	4	Total
Bearkats	10	0	3	12	25
No. 23 Colonels	0	10	0	7	17

at Roy Kidd Stadium • Richmond, Kentucky

- Date: October 15
- Game time: 2:00 p.m. CDT
- Game weather: Sunny
- Game attendance: 13,187
- Referee: Brad Carrell
- TV announcers (ESPN+): Greg Stotelmyer (play-by-play), Jim Tirey (analyst), and Wes Chandler (sideline reporter)
- Box score, Recap

Game information

First quarter

- (11:05) SHSU – Seth Morgan 45-yard field goal (Drive: 10 plays, 37 yards, 3:55; Sam Houston 3–0)
- (2:42) SHSU – Cody Chrest 10-yard pass from Keegan Shoemaker, Seth Morgan kick (Drive: 15 plays, 93 yards, 7:20; Sam Houston 10–0)

Second quarter

- (8:03) EKU – Mo Edwards Jr. 23-yard pass from Parker McKinney, Patrick Nations kick (Drive: 4 plays, 62 yards, 1:53; Sam Houston 10–7)
- (1:59) EKU – Patrick Nations 26-yard field goal (Drive: 12 plays, 42 yards, 5:09; Tied 10–10)

Third quarter

- (1:13) SHSU – Seth Morgan 47-yard field goal (Drive: 6 plays, 22 yards, 1:51; Sam Houston 13–10)

Fourth quarter

- (7:07) SHSU – Seth Morgan 45-yard field goal (Drive: 8 plays, 64 yards, 3:28; Sam Houston 16–10)
- (1:01) EKU – Jayden Higgins 2-yard pass from Patrick McKinney, Patrick Nations kick (Drive: 10 plays, 83 yards, 3:00; Eastern Kentucky 17–16)
- (0:03) SHSU – Seth Morgan 34-yard field goal (Drive: 8 plays, 55 yards, 0:49; Sam Houston 19–17)
- (0:00) SHSU – Tony Williams 0-yard fumble return (Sam Houston 25–17)

Statistics	SHSU	EKU
First downs	19	18
Plays–yards	78–321	62–338
Rushes–yards	45–194	25–104
Passing yards	127	234
Passing: comp–att–int	13–33–0	21–37–0
Time of possession	34:38	24:42

Team	Category	Player	Statistics
Sam Houston	Passing	Keegan Shoemaker	13/31, 127 yards, 1 TD
Sam Houston	Rushing	Zach Hrbacek	17 carries, 111 yards
Sam Houston	Receiving	Noah Smith	4 receptions, 36 yards
Eastern Kentucky	Passing	Parker McKinney	21/37, 234 yards, 2 TD
Eastern Kentucky	Rushing	Braedon Sloan	10 carries, 62 yards
Eastern Kentucky	Receiving	Jyran Mitchell	4 receptions, 69 yards
