= Central Arkansas Bears football =

College football team for University of Central Arkansas

2026 Central Arkansas Bears football team
- First season: 1908; 118 years ago
- Athletic director: Matt Whiting
- Head coach: Nathan Brown; 8th season, 46–44 (.511)
- Location: Conway, Arkansas
- Stadium: Estes Stadium (capacity: 12,000)
- NCAA division: Division I FCS
- Conference: UAC
- Colors: Purple and gray
- All-time record: 554–381–42 (.589)

NAIA national championships
- NAIA Division I: 1984, 1985, 1991

Conference championships
- AIC: 1936, 1937, 1938, 1940, 1959, 1962, 1965, 1966, 1976, 1978, 1980, 1981, 1983, 1984, 1985, 1986, 1987, 1988, 1989, 1990, 1991, 1992 GSC: 2005 SLC: 2008, 2012, 2017, 2019 ASUN: 2022
- Rivalries: McNeese State (rivalry)
- Website: UCASports.com

The Central Arkansas Bears football program is the intercollegiate American football team for University of Central Arkansas (UCA) located in the U.S. state of Arkansas. The team competes in the NCAA Division I Football Championship Subdivision (FCS) as a member of the current United Athletic Conference (UAC), known before July 2026 as the Western Athletic Conference (WAC). The all-sports UAC absorbed a football-only UAC that had started operation in 2023 as an alliance between the WAC and Atlantic Sun Conference (ASUN). For the 2021 season, UCA was a de facto associate member of the WAC, and in 2022 it played in its then-current full-time home of the ASUN. Central Arkansas' first football team was fielded in 1908. The team plays its home games at the 12,000-seat Estes Stadium in Conway, Arkansas. The Bears are coached by Nathan Brown, in his seventh year.

UCA left the Southland Conference, which had been its all-sports home since 2006 and its football home since 2007, for the ASUN Conference in July 2021. At the time, the ASUN did not sponsor football, but committed to launching an FCS football league in the near future. In the 2021 season, UCA competed in a football partnership between the ASUN and WAC officially branded as the "ASUN–WAC Challenge". The ASUN launched its own football league in 2022, but the ASUN and WAC renewed their football partnership for that season; the two leagues shared a single automatic berth in the FCS playoffs in both seasons. After the 2022 season, the ASUN and WAC jointly announced their football-only merger, which was officially rebranded as the United Athletic Conference in April 2023. In turn, the WAC rebranded as the UAC in July 2026, with Central Arkansas as one of five ASUN members, all of which had played in the football-only UAC, to move to the all-sports UAC.

== History ==
The Central Arkansas Bears were formed in 1901 by William Hawkins. Although they finished 1–4–3 in their first season, and have an unusual record of 23–54–22 in the first 20 years of existence, the Bears would play for seven championships in that span.

UCA would enjoy its greatest success over a 14-year period from 1979 to 1992, when the Bears won or shared 13 of the 14 conference championships, as members of the Arkansas Intercollegiate Conference (AIC). The AIC included in-state schools such as Arkansas Tech, Harding University, Henderson State University, Ouachita Baptist University, Southern Arkansas University, University of Arkansas at Monticello, and University of Arkansas at Pine Bluff. During that time frame, UCA won or shared twelve consecutive AIC titles from 1981 to 1992, as well as three NAIA national championships, in 1984, 1985, and 1991. The Bears were consistently present in the NAIA Top 20, and made the playoffs 12 out of 14 seasons.

In 1993, the Bears left the AIC and the NAIA, and moved up in competition to NCAA Division II joining the Gulf South Conference. Central Arkansas would stay in the West Division of the GSC through the 2006 season, winning the GSC title in 2005. Central Arkansas would move up yet again in 2007, joining the Southland Conference and NCAA Division I-AA/FCS. The Bears would win four Southland championships in 2008, 2012, 2017 and 2019. Central Arkansas would make the playoffs in 2011, 2012, 2016, 2017 and 2019 (when it earned its first national seed in the playoffs at No. 8) and winning its first FCS playoff game in 2011 over Tennessee Tech. The Bears also defeated Illinois State in 2016 before losing the next round at Eastern Washington.

In 2021, UCA accepted an invitation to join the ASUN Conference, ending its membership with the Southland on June 30, 2021. The first year of ASUN football was a partnership between the ASUN and the revived football league of the Western Athletic Conference (WAC), called the ASUN–WAC Challenge. After the ASUN's first year, more new members joined, and a full slate of ASUN-only conference games was scheduled in 2022, although further conference realignment led to the ASUN and WAC renewing their alliance for that season. The alliance received an NCAA waiver that gave it an automatic berth in the FCS playoffs. The two conferences fully merged their football leagues after the 2022 season and became the United Athletic Conference (UAC), beginning in 2023. In 2026, the football-only UAC was absorbed by the WAC, which adopted the United Athletic Conference name.

== Notable former players ==
Notable alumni include:

- Nathan Brown
- Dave Burnette
- Monte Coleman
- Tyree Davis
- Willie Davis
- Jacob Ford
- Mike Norvell
- Tremon Smith
- Charlie Strong
- George Odum
- Jonathan Woodard
- David Walker

== Championships ==
=== National championships ===
Central Arkansas has won 3 national championships, all on the NAIA level.

Season	Coach	Selectors	Record	Bowl
1984	Harold Horton	NAIA Playoffs	10–2–1	Won NAIA Championship
1985	Harold Horton	NAIA Playoffs	10–2–1	Won NAIA Championship
1991	Mike Isom	NAIA Playoffs	9–2–2	Won NAIA Championship

=== Conference championships ===
Central Arkansas has won 28 conference championships in the programs history.

- 22 in the Arkansas Intercollegiate Conference (AIC)
- 4 in the Southland Conference
- 1 in the Gulf South Conference
- 1 in the ASUN conference

Year	Coach	Conference	Overall record	Conference record
1936	Warren B. Woodson	Arkansas Intercollegiate Conference	8–0	6–0
1937	Warren B. Woodson	Arkansas Intercollegiate Conference	8–1	4–0
1938	Warren B. Woodson	Arkansas Intercollegiate Conference	7–1	4–0
1940	Warren B. Woodson	Arkansas Intercollegiate Conference	8–1–1	3–0
1959†	Frank Koon	Arkansas Intercollegiate Conference	8–0–1	5–0–1
1962	Frank Koon	Arkansas Intercollegiate Conference	8–2	7–0
1965†	Raymond Bright	Arkansas Intercollegiate Conference	7–1–1	5–1–1
1966†	Raymond Bright	Arkansas Intercollegiate Conference	5–4	4–2
1976†	Ken Stephens	Arkansas Intercollegiate Conference	9–3	5–1
1978	Ken Stephens	Arkansas Intercollegiate Conference	9–2	6–0
1980	Ken Stephens	Arkansas Intercollegiate Conference	9–1	6–0
1981	Ken Stephens	Arkansas Intercollegiate Conference	8–3	6–0
1983	Harold Horton	Arkansas Intercollegiate Conference	11–1	6–0
1984	Harold Horton	Arkansas Intercollegiate Conference	10–2–1	6–0
1985†	Harold Horton	Arkansas Intercollegiate Conference	10–2–1	6–1
1986	Harold Horton	Arkansas Intercollegiate Conference	9–2	7–0
1987	Harold Horton	Arkansas Intercollegiate Conference	11–1	6–0
1988	Harold Horton	Arkansas Intercollegiate Conference	10–1	6–0
1989†	Harold Horton	Arkansas Intercollegiate Conference	9–1	5–1
1990	Mike Isom	Arkansas Intercollegiate Conference	8–4	6–0
1991	Mike Isom	Arkansas Intercollegiate Conference	9–2–2	5–0–1
1992	Mike Isom	Arkansas Intercollegiate Conference	9–2–1	6–0
2005	Clint Conque	Gulf South Conference	11–3	8–1
2008	Clint Conque	Southland Conference	10–2	6–1
2012†	Clint Conque	Southland Conference	9–3	6–1
2017	Steve Campbell	Southland Conference	10–2	9–0
2019†	Nathan Brown	Southland Conference	9–4	7–2
2022†	Nathan Brown	ASUN Conference	5–6	3–2

† Co-champions

== Playoff appearances ==
=== NCAA Division I-AA/FCS ===
The Bears have appeared in the FCS playoffs five times with an overall record of 2–5.

Year	Round	Opponent	Result
2011	First Round; Second Round	Tennessee Tech; Montana	W 34–14; L 14–41
2012	Second Round	Georgia Southern	L 16–24
2016	First Round; Second Round	Illinois State; Eastern Washington	W 31–24; L 14–31
2017	Second Round	New Hampshire	L 15–21
2019	Second Round	Illinois State	L 14–24

=== NCAA Division II ===
The Bears have appeared in the Division II playoffs two times with an overall record of 2–2.

Year	Round	Opponent	Result
2001	First Round	Catawba	L 34–35
2005	First Round; Second Round; Quarterfinals	Albany State (GA); Presbyterian; North Alabama	W 28–20; W 52–28; L 38–41

=== NAIA ===
The Bears have appeared in the NAIA playoffs 13 times with an overall record of 12–10–2. They are three time NAIA National Champions (1984, 1985, 1991), with 1984 and 1985 being Co–Champions after ending in a tie in the National Championship Game.

Year	Round	Opponent	Result
1976	Semifinals; National Championship Game	Elon; Texas A&M-Kingsville	W 10–7; L 0–26
1978	Quarterfinals	Western State	L 17–22
1980	Quarterfinals	Texas A&M-Commerce	L 21–27
1981	Quarterfinals	Cameron	L 27–48
1983	Quarterfinals; Semifinals	Northeastern State (OK); Mesa State	W 18–7; L 17–34
1984	Quarterfinals; Semifinals; National Championship Game	Moorhead State (MN); Central Washington; Carson-Newman	W 30–6; W 44–6; T 19–19
1985	Quarterfinals; Semifinals; National Championship Game	Pittsburg State; Henderson State; Hilldale	W 32–22; W 21–9; T 10–10
1986	Quarterfinals	Cameron	L 34–35 ^{4OT}
1987	First Round; Quarterfinals	Northwestern Oklahoma State; Cameron	W 31–7; L 7–14
1988	First Round	Southeastern Oklahoma State	L 14–21
1990	Quarterfinals; Semifinals	Northeastern State (OK); Mesa State	W 26–14; L 9–10
1991	Quarterfinals; Semifinals; National Championship Game	Northeastern State (OK); Moorhead State (MN); Central State (OH)	W 30–14; W 38–18; W 19–16
1992	Quarterfinals; Semifinals	Southwestern Oklahoma State; Central State (OH)	W 14–2; L 23–30

== Rivalries ==
=== McNeese ===
The Bears and Cowboys have met 13 times on the football field with UCA leading the series, 7–6. Due to conference scheduling requirements, the most recent game was played in 2019.

McNeese–Central Arkansas: All-Time Record
Games played	First meeting	Last meeting	Central Arkansas wins	Central Arkansas losses	Win %
13	September 17, 1994 (lost 7–21)	October 12, 2019 (won 40–31)	7	6	.545

=== Arkansas Tech ===
The Bears also had a long time rivalry with the Arkansas Tech University Wonder Boys located in Russellville, Arkansas, only 45 miles west of Conway along Interstate 40. But that series was discontinued after UCA left the Division II Gulf South Conference, and moved up in competition to the Southland Conference.

== Future non-conference opponents ==
Announced schedules as of October 21, 2026.

2026	2027	2028	2029	2030	2031
at UT Martin	UT Martin	UT Martin	at UT Martin		at North Texas
Central Oklahoma	at Arkansas State	at Houston Christian	at Louisiana Tech		
at Southeast Missouri State	Southeast Missouri State	at UTRGV	Houston Christian		
at Florida State	at Idaho State	at Northwestern State			
UTRGV	Northwestern State				
