= 2026 Central Arkansas Bears football team =

American college football season

2026 Central Arkansas Bears football
- Conference: United Athletic Conference
- Record: 5–7 (3–4 UAC)
- Head coach: Nathan Brown (9th season)
- Offensive coordinator: Jake Walker
- Defensive coordinator: Chad Williams (4th season)
- Home stadium: Estes Stadium

2026 United Athletic Conference standings
| | Conf. | | | Overall |
| Team | W | | L | W | | L |
|---|---|---|---|---|---|---|
| No. 1 Tarleton State $^ | 6 | – | 0 | 11 | – | 0 |
| No. 19 Abilene Christian | 5 | – | 1 | 6 | – | 5 |
| No. 14 Austin Peay | 4 | – | 2 | 8 | – | 3 |
| North Alabama | 4 | – | 2 | 7 | – | 4 |
| Central Arkansas | 2 | – | 4 | 4 | – | 7 |
| Eastern Kentucky | 2 | – | 4 | 3 | – | 8 |
| West Florida* | 1 | – | 5 | 4 | – | 5 |
| West Georgia* | 0 | – | 6 | 1 | – | 10 |
^ – FCS playoff participant; * – Ineligible for UAC title and FCS postseason play due to transition from NCAA Division II.; As of November 22, 2026; Rankings from STATS Poll

The 2026 Central Arkansas Bears football team will represent the University of Central Arkansas as a member of the United Athletic Conference (UAC) during the 2026 NCAA Division I FCS football season. The Bears will be led by ninth-year head coach Nathan Brown and play their home games at the Estes Stadium in Conway, Arkansas.

== Schedule ==
| Date | Time | Opponent | Site | TV | Result | Attendance |
|---|---|---|---|---|---|---|
| August 27 | 6:30 p.m. | at No. 23 UT Martin* | Graham Stadium; Martin, TN | ESPN+ | W 36–24 | 5,516 |
| September 5 | 6:00 p.m. | No. 25 West Florida | Estes Stadium; Conway, AR | ESPN+ | L 14–42 | 5,138 |
| September 12 | 6:00 p.m. | Central Oklahoma* | Estes Stadium; Conway, AR | ESPN+ | W 59–20 | 6,743 |
| September 19 | 6:00 p.m. | at Southeast Missouri State* | Houck Stadium; Cape Girardeau, MO | ESPN+ | L 9–27 | 4,126 |
| September 26 | 2:00 p.m. | at Florida State* | Doak Campbell Stadium; Tallahassee, FL | ACCN | L 7–34 | 67,277 |
| October 10 | 7:00 p.m. | at Abilene Christian | Wildcat Stadium; Abilene, TX | ESPN+ | L 14–20 | 7,466 |
| October 17 | 6:00 p.m. | at No. 2 Tarleton State | Memorial Stadium; Stephenville, TX | ESPN+ | L 35–49 | 23,434 |
| October 24 | 4:00 p.m. | UT Rio Grande Valley* | Estes Stadium; Conway, AR | ESPN+ | L 27–30 ^{OT} | 5,058 |
| October 31 | 4:00 p.m. | North Alabama^{†} | Estes Stadium; Conway, AR | ESPN+ | L 9–14 | 5,179 |
| November 7 | 4:00 p.m. | West Georgia | Estes Stadium; Conway, AR | ESPN+ | W 35–14 | 4,374 |
| November 14 | 1:00 p.m. | at Eastern Kentucky | Roy Kidd Stadium; Richmond, KY | ESPN+ | W 38–35 | 6,281 |
| November 21 | 4:00 p.m. | No. 14 Austin Peay | Estes Stadium; Conway, AR | ESPN+ | W 24–17 | 4,281 |
*Non-conference game; ^{†}Homecoming; Rankings from STATS Poll released prior to the game; All times are in Central time

== Game summaries ==
=== at No. 23 UT Martin ===
Central Arkansas Bears (0–0) at No. 23 UT Martin Skyhawks (0–0) – Game summary

| Quarter | 1 | 2 | 3 | 4 | Total |
|---|---|---|---|---|---|
| Bears | 6 | 13 | 7 | 10 | 36 |
| No. 23 Skyhawks | 7 | 10 | 0 | 7 | 24 |

at Graham Stadium • Martin, Tennessee

- Date: August 27
- Game time: 6:30 p.m.
- Game weather: Sunny • Temperature: 84 °F (29 °C) • Wind: N at 7 miles per hour (11 km/h)
- Game attendance: 5,516
- Referee: Michael Lennie
- TV announcers (ESPN+): Davis Gregory and Chris Brinkley

Game information

First quarter

- UTM – Trey Cotton 55-yard interception return (Brandon Sims kick), 8:05. Skyhawks 7–0.
- CARK – Kealen Juniel 8-yard pass from Donovyn Omolo (Caleb Jones PAT failed), 5:42. Skyhawks 7–6. Drive: 6 plays, 81 yards, 2:18.

Second quarter

- UTM – Brandon Sims 25-yard field goal, 13:47. Skyhawks 10–6. Drive: 13 plays, 59 yards, 6:48.
- CARK – Que Tillman 3-yard run (Caleb Jones kick), 6:53. Bears 13–10. Drive: 15 plays, 75 yards, 6:54.
- UTM – Tommy Ansley 7-yard run (Brandon Sims kick), 1:56. Skyhawks 17–13. Drive: 10 plays, 75 yards, 4:57.
- CARK – Arlie Lee 19-yard pass from Donovyn Omolo (Caleb Jones PAT blocked), 0:27. Bears 19–17. Drive: 8 plays, 75 yards, 1:29.

Third quarter

- CARK – Arlie Lee 51-yard pass from Donovyn Omolo (Caleb Jones kick), 12:04. Bears 26–17. Drive: 6 plays, 75 yards, 2:56.

Fourth quarter

- CARK – Caleb Jones 32-yard field goal, 12:52. Bears 29–17. Drive: 14 plays, 66 yards, 6:28.
- UTM – Tommy Ansley 24-yard run (Brandon Sims kick), 9:49. Bears 29–24. Drive: 7 plays, 75 yards, 3:03.
- UCA – Jalen Washington 27-yard run (Caleb Jones kick), 3:38. Bears 36–24. Drive: 13 plays, 75 yards, 6:11.

| Statistics | CARK | UTM |
|---|---|---|
| First downs | 23 | 16 |
| Plays–yards | 72–471 | 57–296 |
| Rushes–yards | 45–228 | 33–149 |
| Passing yards | 243 | 147 |
| Passing: comp–att–int | 20–27–1 | 13–24–2 |
| Turnovers | 1 | 2 |
| Time of possession | 30:18 | 29:42 |

| Team | Category | Player | Statistics |
|---|---|---|---|
| Central Arkansas | Passing | Donovyn Omolo | 20/27, 243 yards, 3 TD, INT |
| Central Arkansas | Rushing | Donovyn Omolo | 12 carries, 118 yards |
| Central Arkansas | Receiving | Arlie Lee | 2 receptions, 70 yards, 2 TD |
| UT Martin | Passing | Julian Calvez | 13/24, 147 yards, 2 INT |
| UT Martin | Rushing | Tommy Ansley | 10 carries, 61 yards, 2 TD |
| UT Martin | Receiving | Kaleb Washington | 3 receptions, 53 yards |

=== No. 25 West Florida ===
No. 25 West Florida Argonauts (1–0) at Central Arkansas Bears (1–0) – Game summary

| Quarter | 1 | 2 | 3 | 4 | Total |
|---|---|---|---|---|---|
| No. 25 Argonauts | 14 | 14 | 14 | 0 | 42 |
| Bears | 0 | 7 | 7 | 0 | 14 |

at Estes Stadium • Conway, Arkansas

- Date: September 5
- Game time: 6:00 p.m.
- Game weather: Sunny
- Game attendance: 5,138
- Referee: Gabriel Tomlin
- TV announcers (ESPN+): Dylan McLemore (play-by-play) and Wess Moore (analyst)

Game information

First quarter

- UWF – Ty'ray Davis 7-yard run (Brogan Woeber kick), 13:09. Argonauts 7–0. Drive: 1 play, 7 yards, 3:54.
- UWF – TJ Lane 3-yard run (Brogan Woeber kick), 3:19. Argonauts 14–0. Drive: 5 plays, 47 yards, 2:45.

Second quarter

- CARK – Donovyn Omolo 44-yard run (Caleb Jones kick), 11:44. Argonauts 14–7. Drive: 6 plays, 99 yards, 3:07.
- UWF – Brite Cannon 35-yard pass from Ty'ray Davis (Brogan Woeber kick), 5:51. Argonauts 21–7. Drive: 5 plays, 46 yards, 2:43.
- UWF – Tyler Dostin 8-yard pass from Ty'ray Davis (Brogan Woeber kick), 1:49. Argonauts 28–7. Drive: 7 plays, 35 yards, 3:23.

Third quarter

- UWF – A'Khoury Lyde 37-yard interception return (Brogan Woeber kick), 14:32. Argonauts 35–7.
- UWF – Gage Armbruster 42-yard pass from Ty'ray Davis (Brogan Woeber kick), 7:56. Argonauts 42–7. Drive: 9 plays, 83 yards, 4:40.
- CARK – James Jointer Jr. 24-yard pass from Donovyn Omolo (Caleb Jones kick), 4:11. Argonauts 42–14. Drive: 9 plays, 75 yards, 3:45.

Fourth quarter

- No scoring plays.

| Statistics | CARK | UWF |
|---|---|---|
| First downs | 19 | 20 |
| Plays–yards | 57–347 | 63–404 |
| Rushes–yards | 26–150 | 40–156 |
| Passing yards | 197 | 248 |
| Passing: comp–att–int | 21–31–1 | 17–23–0 |
| Turnovers | 3 | 0 |
| Time of possession | 27:50 | 32:10 |

| Team | Category | Player | Statistics |
|---|---|---|---|
| Central Arkansas | Passing | Donovyn Omolo | 21/31, 197 yards, TD, INT |
| Central Arkansas | Rushing | Donovyn Omolo | 17 carries, 125 yards, TD |
| Central Arkansas | Receiving | Tyrell Pollard | 4 receptions, 62 yards |
| West Florida | Passing | Ty'ray Davis | 14/17, 227 yards, 3 TD |
| West Florida | Rushing | Ty'ray Davis | 9 carries, 75 yards, TD |
| West Florida | Receiving | Gage Armbruster | 2 receptions, 80 yards, TD |

=== Central Oklahoma (DII) ===
Central Oklahoma (DII) Bronchos (1–0) at Central Arkansas Bears (1–1) – Game summary

| Quarter | 1 | 2 | 3 | 4 | Total |
|---|---|---|---|---|---|
| Bronchos (DII) | 0 | 10 | 0 | 10 | 20 |
| Bears | 10 | 14 | 21 | 14 | 59 |

at Estes Stadium • Conway, Arkansas

- Date: September 12
- Game time: 6:00 p.m.
- Game weather: Sunny
- Game attendance: 6,743
- Referee: Bradley Eiras
- TV: ESPN+

Game information

First quarter

- (7:26) CARK – Caleb Jones 33-yard field goal (Drive: 10 plays, 88 yards, 5:33; Central Arkansas 3–0)
- (3:32) CARK – Donovyn Omolo 9-yard run, Caleb Jones kick (Drive: 7 plays, 56 yards, 2:20; Central Arkansas 10–0)

Second quarter

- (14:02) UCO – Andrew Carney 3-yard pass from Jett Huff, Bradley Thao kick (Drive: 10 plays, 75 yards, 4:30; Central Arkansas 10–7)
- (13:07) CARK – Ty Durham 21-yard pass from Donovyn Omolo, Caleb Jones kick (Drive: 2 plays, 92 yards, 0:48; Central Arkansas 17–7)
- (5:59) CARK – Cameron Young 2-yard run, Caleb Jones kick (Drive: 8 plays, 44 yards, 3:59; Central Arkansas 24–7)
- (0:02) UCO – Bradley Thao 23-yard field goal (Drive: 6 plays, 74 yards, 2:09; Central Arkansas 24–10)

Third quarter

- (14:06) CARK – Jalen Washington 71-yard run, Caleb Jones kick (Drive: 1 play, 71 yards, 0:12; Central Arkansas 31–10)
- (13:32) CARK – Bryson Adamoh 29-yard interception, Caleb Jones kick (Central Arkansas 38–10)
- (9:26) CARK – Dakarai Anderson 6-yard pass from Donovyn Omolo, Caleb Jones kick (Drive: 6 plays, 44 yards, 2:39; Central Arkansas 45–10)

Fourth quarter

- (14:05) UCO – Matthew Ciers 0-yard punt return, Bradley Thao kick (Central Arkansas 45–17)
- (8:58) CARK – Ty Durham 4-yard pass from Tyler Dudden, Caleb Jones kick (Drive: 8 plays, 75 yards, 5:07; Central Arkansas 52–17)
- (6:08) CARK – Enoch Assan 56-yard run, Caleb Jones kick (Drive: 1 play, 56 yards, 0:14; Central Arkansas 59–17)
- (3:01) UCO – Bradley Thao 37-yard field goal (Drive: 7 plays, 45 yards, 3:05; Central Arkansas 59–20)

| Statistics | UCO | CARK |
|---|---|---|
| First downs | 18 | 20 |
| Plays–yards | 64–320 | 62–544 |
| Rushes–yards | 27–32 | 45–407 |
| Passing yards | 288 | 137 |
| Passing: comp–att–int | 24–37–4 | 12–17–0 |
| Turnovers | 6 | 0 |
| Time of possession | 28:39 | 31:21 |

| Team | Category | Player | Statistics |
|---|---|---|---|
| Central Oklahoma | Passing | Jett Huff | 17/27, 199 yards, TD, 3 INT |
| Central Oklahoma | Rushing | Dev Mathews | 5 carries, 49 yards |
| Central Oklahoma | Receiving | Tahkari Bethel | 5 receptions, 105 yards |
| Central Arkansas | Passing | Donovyn Omolo | 11/15, 133 yards, 2 TD |
| Central Arkansas | Rushing | Jalen Washington | 12 carries, 202 yards, TD |
| Central Arkansas | Receiving | Tyrell Pollard | 3 receptions, 79 yards |

=== at Southeast Missouri State ===
Central Arkansas Bears (2–1) at Southeast Missouri State Redhawks (1–2) – Game summary

| Quarter | 1 | 2 | 3 | 4 | Total |
|---|---|---|---|---|---|
| Bears | 0 | 0 | 0 | 0 | 0 |
| Redhawks | 0 | 0 | 0 | 0 | 0 |

at Houck Stadium • Cape Girardeau, Missouri

- Date: September 19
- Game time: 6:00 p.m.
- TV: ESPN+

Game information

First quarter
Second quarter
Third quarter
Fourth quarter

| Statistics | CARK | SEMO |
|---|---|---|
| First downs | | |
| Plays–yards | | |
| Rushes–yards | | |
| Passing yards | | |
| Passing: comp–att–int | | |
| Turnovers | | |
| Time of possession | | |

| Team | Category | Player | Statistics |
|---|---|---|---|
| Central Arkansas | Passing | | |
| Central Arkansas | Rushing | | |
| Central Arkansas | Receiving | | |
| Southeast Missouri State | Passing | | |
| Southeast Missouri State | Rushing | | |
| Southeast Missouri State | Receiving | | |

=== at Florida State (FBS) ===
Central Arkansas Bears (2–2) at Florida State Seminoles (FBS) (1–2) – Game summary

| Quarter | 1 | 2 | 3 | 4 | Total |
|---|---|---|---|---|---|
| Bears | 0 | 0 | 0 | 0 | 0 |
| Seminoles (FBS) | 0 | 0 | 0 | 0 | 0 |

at Doak Campbell Stadium • Tallahassee, Florida

- Date: September 26
- Game time: 3:00 p.m. EDT
- TV announcers (ACCN): Doug Sherman, Forrest Conoly and Ashley Stroehlein

Game information

First quarter
Second quarter
Third quarter
Fourth quarter

| Statistics | CARK | FSU |
|---|---|---|
| First downs | | |
| Plays–yards | | |
| Rushes–yards | | |
| Passing yards | | |
| Passing: comp–att–int | | |
| Turnovers | | |
| Time of possession | | |

| Team | Category | Player | Statistics |
|---|---|---|---|
| Central Arkansas | Passing | | |
| Central Arkansas | Rushing | | |
| Central Arkansas | Receiving | | |
| Florida State | Passing | | |
| Florida State | Rushing | | |
| Florida State | Receiving | | |

=== at Abilene Christian ===
Central Arkansas Bears (2–3) at Abilene Christian Wildcats (2–4) – Game summary

| Quarter | 1 | 2 | 3 | 4 | Total |
|---|---|---|---|---|---|
| Bears | 0 | 0 | 0 | 0 | 0 |
| Wildcats | 0 | 0 | 0 | 0 | 0 |

at Wildcat Stadium • Abilene, Texas

- Date: October 10
- Game time: 7:00 p.m.

Game information

First quarter
Second quarter
Third quarter
Fourth quarter

| Statistics | CARK | ACU |
|---|---|---|
| First downs | | |
| Plays–yards | | |
| Rushes–yards | | |
| Passing yards | | |
| Passing: comp–att–int | | |
| Turnovers | | |
| Time of possession | | |

| Team | Category | Player | Statistics |
|---|---|---|---|
| Central Arkansas | Passing | | |
| Central Arkansas | Rushing | | |
| Central Arkansas | Receiving | | |
| Abilene Christian | Passing | | |
| Abilene Christian | Rushing | | |
| Abilene Christian | Receiving | | |

=== at No. 2 Tarleton State ===
Central Arkansas Bears (2–4) at No. 2 Tarleton State Texans (6–0) – Game summary

| Quarter | 1 | 2 | 3 | 4 | Total |
|---|---|---|---|---|---|
| Bears | 0 | 0 | 0 | 0 | 0 |
| No. 2 Texans | 0 | 0 | 0 | 0 | 0 |

at Memorial Stadium • Stephenville, Texas

- Date: October 17

Game information

First quarter
Second quarter
Third quarter
Fourth quarter

| Statistics | CARK | TAR |
|---|---|---|
| First downs | | |
| Plays–yards | | |
| Rushes–yards | | |
| Passing yards | | |
| Passing: comp–att–int | | |
| Turnovers | | |
| Time of possession | | |

| Team | Category | Player | Statistics |
|---|---|---|---|
| Central Arkansas | Passing | | |
| Central Arkansas | Rushing | | |
| Central Arkansas | Receiving | | |
| Tarleton State | Passing | | |
| Tarleton State | Rushing | | |
| Tarleton State | Receiving | | |

=== UT Rio Grande Valley ===
UT Rio Grande Valley Vaqueros (3–4) at Central Arkansas Bears (2–5) – Game summary

| Quarter | 1 | 2 | 3 | 4 | Total |
|---|---|---|---|---|---|
| Vaqueros | 0 | 0 | 0 | 0 | 0 |
| Bears | 0 | 0 | 0 | 0 | 0 |

at Estes Stadium • Conway, Arkansas

- Date: October 24
- Game time: 4:00 p.m.

Game information

First quarter
Second quarter
Third quarter
Fourth quarter

| Statistics | RGV | CARK |
|---|---|---|
| First downs | | |
| Plays–yards | | |
| Rushes–yards | | |
| Passing yards | | |
| Passing: comp–att–int | | |
| Turnovers | | |
| Time of possession | | |

| Team | Category | Player | Statistics |
|---|---|---|---|
| UT Rio Grande Valley | Passing | | |
| UT Rio Grande Valley | Rushing | | |
| UT Rio Grande Valley | Receiving | | |
| Central Arkansas | Passing | | |
| Central Arkansas | Rushing | | |
| Central Arkansas | Receiving | | |

=== North Alabama ===
North Alabama Lions (4–4) at Central Arkansas Bears (2–6) – Game summary

| Quarter | 1 | 2 | 3 | 4 | Total |
|---|---|---|---|---|---|
| Lions | 0 | 0 | 0 | 0 | 0 |
| Bears | 0 | 0 | 0 | 0 | 0 |

at Estes Stadium • Conway, Arkansas

- Date: October 31
- Game time: 4:00 p.m.

Game information

First quarter
Second quarter
Third quarter
Fourth quarter

| Statistics | UNA | CARK |
|---|---|---|
| First downs | | |
| Plays–yards | | |
| Rushes–yards | | |
| Passing yards | | |
| Passing: comp–att–int | | |
| Turnovers | | |
| Time of possession | | |

| Team | Category | Player | Statistics |
|---|---|---|---|
| North Alabama | Passing | | |
| North Alabama | Rushing | | |
| North Alabama | Receiving | | |
| Central Arkansas | Passing | | |
| Central Arkansas | Rushing | | |
| Central Arkansas | Receiving | | |

=== West Georgia ===
West Georgia Wolves (1–8) at Central Arkansas Bears (2–7) – Game summary

| Quarter | 1 | 2 | 3 | 4 | Total |
|---|---|---|---|---|---|
| Wolves | 0 | 0 | 0 | 0 | 0 |
| Bears | 0 | 0 | 0 | 0 | 0 |

at Estes Stadium • Conway, Arkansas

- Date: November 7
- Game time: 4:00 p.m.

Game information

First quarter
Second quarter
Third quarter
Fourth quarter

| Statistics | UWG | CARK |
|---|---|---|
| First downs | | |
| Plays–yards | | |
| Rushes–yards | | |
| Passing yards | | |
| Passing: comp–att–int | | |
| Turnovers | | |
| Time of possession | | |

| Team | Category | Player | Statistics |
|---|---|---|---|
| West Georgia | Passing | | |
| West Georgia | Rushing | | |
| West Georgia | Receiving | | |
| Central Arkansas | Passing | | |
| Central Arkansas | Rushing | | |
| Central Arkansas | Receiving | | |

=== at Eastern Kentucky ===
Central Arkansas Bears (3–7) at Eastern Kentucky Colonels (3–7) – Game summary

| Quarter | 1 | 2 | 3 | 4 | Total |
|---|---|---|---|---|---|
| Bears | 0 | 0 | 0 | 0 | 0 |
| Colonels | 0 | 0 | 0 | 0 | 0 |

at Roy Kidd Stadium • Richmond, Kentucky

- Date: November 14

Game information

First quarter
Second quarter
Third quarter
Fourth quarter

| Statistics | CARK | EKU |
|---|---|---|
| First downs | | |
| Plays–yards | | |
| Rushes–yards | | |
| Passing yards | | |
| Passing: comp–att–int | | |
| Turnovers | | |
| Time of possession | | |

| Team | Category | Player | Statistics |
|---|---|---|---|
| Central Arkansas | Passing | | |
| Central Arkansas | Rushing | | |
| Central Arkansas | Receiving | | |
| Eastern Kentucky | Passing | | |
| Eastern Kentucky | Rushing | | |
| Eastern Kentucky | Receiving | | |

=== No. 14 Austin Peay ===
No. 14 Austin Peay Governors (8–3) at Central Arkansas Bears (4–7) – Game summary

| Quarter | 1 | 2 | 3 | 4 | Total |
|---|---|---|---|---|---|
| No. 14 Governors | 0 | 0 | 0 | 0 | 0 |
| Bears | 0 | 0 | 0 | 0 | 0 |

at Estes Stadium • Conway, Arkansas

- Date: November 21
- Game time: 4:00 p.m.

Game information

First quarter
Second quarter
Third quarter
Fourth quarter

| Statistics | APSU | CARK |
|---|---|---|
| First downs | | |
| Plays–yards | | |
| Rushes–yards | | |
| Passing yards | | |
| Passing: comp–att–int | | |
| Turnovers | | |
| Time of possession | | |

| Team | Category | Player | Statistics |
|---|---|---|---|
| Austin Peay | Passing | | |
| Austin Peay | Rushing | | |
| Austin Peay | Receiving | | |
| Central Arkansas | Passing | | |
| Central Arkansas | Rushing | | |
| Central Arkansas | Receiving | | |

== Rankings ==
Ranking movements Legend: ██ Increase in ranking ██ Decrease in ranking — = Not ranked RV = Received votes
| | Week | | | | | | | | | | | | | | |
| Poll | Pre | 1 | 2 | 3 | 4 | 5 | 6 | 7 | 8 | 9 | 10 | 11 | 12 | 13 | Final |
|---|---|---|---|---|---|---|---|---|---|---|---|---|---|---|---|
| STATS | — | RV | — | — | | | | | | | | | | | |
| Coaches | RV | 24 | RV | RV | | | | | | | | | | | |
