= 2022 Southern Utah Thunderbirds football team =

American college football season

2022 Southern Utah Thunderbirds football
- Conference: Western Athletic Conference
- Record: 5–6 (1–3 WAC)
- Head coach: DeLane Fitzgerald (1st season)
- Offensive coordinator: Blair Peterson (1st season)
- Defensive coordinator: John Kelling (1st season)
- Home stadium: Eccles Coliseum

2022 WAC–ASUN Challenge football standings
	Conf.			Overall
Team	W		L	W		L
Eastern Kentucky $^	4	–	1	7	–	5
Central Arkansas	4	–	1	5	–	6
Austin Peay	3	–	1	7	–	4
Stephen F. Austin	2	–	1	6	–	5
Abilene Christian	1	–	1	7	–	4
Kennesaw State	1	–	3	5	–	6
Southern Utah	0	–	3	5	–	6
North Alabama	0	–	4	1	–	10
$ – Conference champion; ^ – FCS playoff participant; Rankings from STATS Poll

2022 Western Athletic Conference football standings
	Conf.			Overall
Team	W		L	W		L
Stephen F. Austin +	3	–	1	6	–	5
Abilene Christian +	3	–	1	7	–	4
Sam Houston *	3	–	2	5	–	4
Utah Tech *	2	–	2	4	–	7
Tarleton State *	1	–	3	6	–	5
Southern Utah	1	–	3	5	–	6
+ – Conference co-champions; * Note: Sam Houston ineligible for WAC championship and FCS postseason play due to start of transition to FBS; Tarleton and Utah Tech ineligible for FCS postseason play due to transition from NCAA Division II.; Rankings from STATS Poll

The 2022 Southern Utah Thunderbirds football team represented Southern Utah University in the Western Athletic Conference (WAC) during the 2022 NCAA Division I FCS football season. Led by first-year head coach DeLane Fitzgerald, the Thunderbirds played home games at Eccles Coliseum in Cedar City, Utah. Previously a member of the Big Sky Conference for a decade, this was Southern Utah's first season in the WAC.

== Schedule ==
Southern Utah and the WAC announced the 2022 football schedule on January 12, 2022.

Date	Time	Opponent	Site	TV	Result	Attendance
September 1	6:00 p.m.	St. Thomas (MN)*	Eccles Coliseum; Cedar City, UT	ESPN+	W 44–13	5,000
September 10	11:30 a.m.	at No. 13 (FBS) Utah*	Rice–Eccles Stadium; Salt Lake City, UT	P12N	L 7–73	51,531
September 17	3:00 p.m.	at Western Illinois*	Hanson Field; Macomb, IL	ESPN+	W 17–10	5,024
September 24	6:00 p.m.	Utah Tech^{†}	Eccles Coliseum; Cedar City, UT	ESPN+	W 31–17	8,069
October 1	4:00 p.m.	at No. 25 Eastern Kentucky*	Roy Kidd Stadium; Richmond, KY	ESPN+	L 28–35	14,099
October 8	6:00 p.m.	Tarleton State	Eccles Coliseum; Cedar City, UT	ESPN+	L 40–42	4,132
October 15	2:30 p.m.	at Abilene Christian	Wildcat Stadium; Abilene, TX	ESPN+	L 18–21	10,229
October 22	1:00 p.m.	Stephen F. Austin	Eccles Coliseum; Cedar City, UT	ESPN+	L 38–41	3,268
November 5	11:00 a.m.	at Utah Tech*	Greater Zion Stadium; St. George, UT	ESPN+	L 36–48	6,903
November 12	11:00 a.m.	Lincoln (CA)*	Eccles Coliseum; Cedar City, UT	ESPN+	W 55–0	3,556
November 19	11:00 a.m.	at Sam Houston	Bowers Stadium; Huntsville, TX	ESPN+	W 17–7	7,059
*Non-conference game; ^{†}Homecoming; Rankings from STATS Poll released prior to the game; All times are in Mountain time

== Game summaries ==
=== St. Thomas (MN) ===
	1	2	3	4	Total
Tommies	7	0	6	0	13
Thunderbirds	10	10	11	13	44

=== At No. 13 (FBS) Utah ===
Overall record	Previous meeting	Previous winner
2–0	September 1, 2016	Utah Utes

Southern Utah Thunderbirds (1–0) vs No. 13 Utah Utes (0–1) – Game summary

Quarter	1	2	3	4	Total
Thunderbirds	7	0	0	0	7
No. 13 Utes	7	38	14	14	73

at Rice-Eccles Stadium • Salt Lake City, UT

- Date: September 10, 2022
- Game time: 11:30 a.m.
- Game weather: Sunny, 70 °F (21 °C)
- Game attendance: 51,531
- Referee: Mark Duddy
- TV announcers (Pac-12 Network): Roxy Bernstein (play-by-play), Lincoln Kennedy (analyst)

Game information

First Quarter

- (10:33) UTAH – Tavion Thomas 13-yard run, Jordan Noyes kick (Drive: 8 plays, 44 yards, 4:24; Utah 7–0)
- (2:22) USU – Grady Robison 28-yard run, Micah Petit kick (Drive: 1 plays, 28 yards, 0:08; Tied 7–7)

Second Quarter

- (14:38) UTAH – Tavion Thomas 7-yard run, Jordan Noyes kick (Drive: 7 plays, 56 yards, 2:35; Utah 14–7)
- (13:27) UTAH – Chris Curry 12-yard run, Jordan Noyes kick (Drive: 2 plays, 18 yards, 1:05; Utah 21–7)
- (8:34) UTAH – Jordan Noyes 26-yard field goal (Drive: 6 plays, 37 yards, 2:12; Utah 24–7)
- (4:13) UTAH – Brant Kuithe 2-yard pass from Cameron Rising, Jordan Noyes kick (Drive: 5 plays, 65 yards, 2:49; Utah 31–7)
- (1:08) UTAH – Dalton Kincaid 37-yard pass from Cameron Rising, Jordan Noyes kick (Drive: 5 plays, 85 yards, 1:30; Utah 38–7)
- (0:12) UTAH – Dalton Kincaid 6-yard pass from Cameron Rising, Jordan Noyes kick (Drive: 4 plays, 57 yards, 0:28; Utah 45–7)

Third Quarter

- (13:53) UTAH – R. J. Hubert 39-yard interception return, Jordan Noyes kick (Utah 52-7)
- (7:49) UTAH – Jaylon Glover 4-yard run, Jordan Noyes kick (Drive: 6 plays, 78 yards, 3:06; Utah 59–7)

Fourth Quarter

- (14:18) UTAH – Thomas Tassmin 29-yard pass from Bryson Barnes, Jordon Noyes kick (Drive: 12 plays, 80 yards, 7:31; Utah 66–7)
- (10:54) UTAH – Jaylon Glover 29-yard run, Jordan Noyes kick (Drive: 2 plays, 72 yards, 0:52; Utah 73–7)

Statistics	SUU	UTAH
First downs	4	31
Total yards	85	598
Rushes/yards	21–43	42–246
Passing yards	42	352
Passing: Comp–Att–Int	11–23–2	23–29–0
Time of possession	23:34	36:26

Team	Category	Player	Statistics
Southern Utah	Passing	Justin Miller	11/21, 42 yards, 2 INT
Southern Utah	Rushing	Grady Robison	2 carries, 27 yards, TD
Southern Utah	Receiving	Timothy Patrick	4 receptions, 17 yards
Utah	Passing	Cameron Rising	17/23, 254 yards, 3 TD
Utah	Rushing	Chris Curry	6 carries, 66 yards, TD
Utah	Receiving	Dalton Kincaid	7 receptions, 107 yards, 2 TD

=== At Western Illinois ===
	1	2	3	4	Total
Thunderbirds	10	0	0	7	17
Leathernecks	0	3	0	7	10

=== At No. 25 Eastern Kentucky ===
	1	2	3	4	Total
Thunderbirds	0	14	7	7	28
No. 25 Colonels	7	14	7	7	35

=== Tarleton State ===
	1	2	3	4	Total
Texans	0	14	21	7	42
Thunderbirds	0	10	3	27	40
