= 2022 Eastern Kentucky Colonels football team =

American college football season

2022 Eastern Kentucky Colonels football

ASUN co-champion

NCAA Division I First Round, L 41–52 vs. Gardner–Webb
- Conference: ASUN Conference
- Record: 7–5 (3–2 ASUN)
- Head coach: Walt Wells (3rd season)
- Offensive coordinator: Andy Richman (3rd season)
- Defensive coordinator: Jake Johnson (3rd season)
- Home stadium: Roy Kidd Stadium

2022 ASUN Conference football standings
	Conf.			Overall
Team	W		L	W		L
Jacksonville State*	5	–	0	9	–	2
Austin Peay +	3	–	2	7	–	4
Eastern Kentucky +^	3	–	2	7	–	5
Central Arkansas +	3	–	2	5	–	6
Kennesaw State	1	–	4	5	–	6
North Alabama	0	–	5	1	–	10
+ – Conference co-champions; ^ – FCS playoff participant; Note: Jacksonville State ineligible for postseason play and ASUN title due to start of transition to FBS.; Rankings from STATS Poll

2022 WAC–ASUN Challenge football standings
	Conf.			Overall
Team	W		L	W		L
Eastern Kentucky $^	4	–	1	7	–	5
Central Arkansas	4	–	1	5	–	6
Austin Peay	3	–	1	7	–	4
Stephen F. Austin	2	–	1	6	–	5
Abilene Christian	1	–	1	7	–	4
Kennesaw State	1	–	3	5	–	6
Southern Utah	0	–	3	5	–	6
North Alabama	0	–	4	1	–	10
$ – Conference champion; ^ – FCS playoff participant; Rankings from STATS Poll

The 2022 Eastern Kentucky Colonels football team represented Eastern Kentucky University as a member of the ASUN Conference during the 2022 NCAA Division I FCS football season. They were led by Walt Wells in his third season, and played their home games at Roy Kidd Stadium. On August 28, Wells had a cardiac episode. The following day, Garry McPeek was named the acting head coach.

== Schedule ==
Date	Time	Opponent	Rank	Site	TV	Result	Attendance
September 2	7:00 p.m.	at Eastern Michigan*		Rynearson Stadium; Ypsilanti, MI	ESPN3	L 34–42	16,531
September 10	4:00 p.m.	at Bowling Green*		Doyt Perry Stadium; Bowling Green, OH	ESPN3	W 59–57 ^{7OT}	17,376
September 17	6:00 p.m.	Charleston Southern*	No. 19	Roy Kidd Stadium; Richmond, KY	ESPN+	W 40–17	16,906
September 24	4:00 p.m.	at Austin Peay	No. 16	Fortera Stadium; Clarksville, TN	ESPN+	L 20–31	8,827
October 1	6:00 p.m.	Southern Utah	No. 25	Roy Kidd Stadium; Richmond, KY	ESPN+	W 35–28	14,099
October 15	6:00 p.m.	Sam Houston	No. 23	Roy Kidd Stadium; Richmond, KY	ESPN+	L 17–25	13,187
October 22	3:00 p.m.	North Alabama^{†}		Roy Kidd Stadium; Richmond, KY	ESPN+	W 56–53	15,244
October 29	2:00 p.m.	at No. 15 Southeast Missouri State*		Houck Stadium; Cape Girardeau, MO	ESPN3	W 28–23	4,902
November 5	5:00 p.m.	Central Arkansas		Roy Kidd Stadium; Richmond, KY	ESPN+	W 42–14	9,164
November 12	2:00 p.m.	at Jacksonville State		Burgess–Snow Field at JSU Stadium; Jacksonville, AL	ESPN+	L 17–42	15,875
November 19	3:00 p.m.	Kennesaw State		Roy Kidd Stadium; Richmond, KY	ESPN+	W 45–38	7,053
November 26	5:00 p.m.	Gardner–Webb*		Roy Kidd Stadium; Richmond, KY (NCAA Division I First Round)	ESPN+	L 41–52	4,973
*Non-conference game; ^{†}Homecoming; Rankings from STATS Poll released prior to the game; All times are in Eastern time

== Game summaries ==
=== At Eastern Michigan ===
	1	2	3	4	Total
Colonels	0	10	7	17	34
Eagles	0	14	14	14	42

=== At Bowling Green ===
	1	2	3	4	OT	2OT	3OT	4OT	5OT	6OT	7OT	Total
Colonels	0	24	7	7	7	6	2	2	0	2	2	59
Falcons	10	7	7	14	7	6	2	2	0	2	0	57

=== Charleston Southern ===
	1	2	3	4	Total
Buccaneers	0	10	0	7	17
No. 19 Colonels	16	0	17	7	40

=== At Austin Peay ===
	1	2	3	4	Total
No. 16 Colonels	10	10	0	0	20
Governors	3	0	7	21	31

=== Southern Utah ===
	1	2	3	4	Total
Thunderbirds	0	14	7	7	28
No. 25 Colonels	7	14	7	7	35

=== Sam Houston ===
	1	2	3	4	Total
Bearkats	10	0	3	12	25
No. 23 Colonels	0	10	0	7	17

=== North Alabama ===
	1	2	3	4	Total
Lions	14	7	14	18	53
Colonels	7	28	7	14	56

=== At No. 15 Southeast Missouri State ===
	1	2	3	4	Total
Colonels	0	0	22	6	28
No. 15 Redhawks	10	3	3	7	23

=== Central Arkansas ===
	1	2	3	4	Total
Bears	0	7	0	7	14
Colonels	7	14	7	14	42

=== At Jacksonville State ===
	1	2	3	4	Total
Colonels	0	7	10	0	17
Gamecocks	7	14	14	7	42

=== Kennesaw State ===
	1	2	3	4	Total
Owls	14	0	10	14	38
Colonels	9	14	15	7	45

=== Gardner–Webb—NCAA Division I First Round ===
	1	2	3	4	Total
Runnin' Bulldogs	21	10	21	0	52
Colonels	14	13	0	14	41
