= 2022 Austin Peay Governors football team =

American college football season

2022 Austin Peay Governors football

WAC–ASUN Challenge co-champion
- Conference: ASUN Conference
- Record: 7–4 (3–2 ASUN)
- Head coach: Scotty Walden (3rd season)
- Co-offensive coordinator: Ryan Stanchek (1st season)
- Offensive scheme: Spread
- Co-defensive coordinators: Chris Kappas (3rd season); Akeem Davis (3rd season)
- Base defense: 4–2–5
- Home stadium: Fortera Stadium

2022 ASUN Conference football standings
	Conf.			Overall
Team	W		L	W		L
Jacksonville State*	5	–	0	9	–	2
Austin Peay +	3	–	2	7	–	4
Eastern Kentucky +^	3	–	2	7	–	5
Central Arkansas +	3	–	2	5	–	6
Kennesaw State	1	–	4	5	–	6
North Alabama	0	–	5	1	–	10
+ – Conference co-champions; ^ – FCS playoff participant; Note: Jacksonville State ineligible for postseason play and ASUN title due to start of transition to FBS.; Rankings from STATS Poll

2022 WAC–ASUN Challenge football standings
	Conf.			Overall
Team	W		L	W		L
Eastern Kentucky $^	4	–	1	7	–	5
Central Arkansas	4	–	1	5	–	6
Austin Peay	3	–	1	7	–	4
Stephen F. Austin	2	–	1	6	–	5
Abilene Christian	1	–	1	7	–	4
Kennesaw State	1	–	3	5	–	6
Southern Utah	0	–	3	5	–	6
North Alabama	0	–	4	1	–	10
$ – Conference champion; ^ – FCS playoff participant; Rankings from STATS Poll

The 2022 Austin Peay Governors football team represented Austin Peay State University during the 2022 NCAA Division I FCS football season as a member of the ASUN Conference (ASUN), coinciding with the conference's addition of football for that season. They were led by third-year head coach Scotty Walden and played their games at Fortera Stadium in Clarksville, Tennessee.

== Schedule ==
Date	Time	Opponent	Rank	Site	TV	Result	Attendance
August 27	12:00 p.m.	at Western Kentucky*		Houchens Industries–L. T. Smith Stadium; Bowling Green, KY	CBSSN	L 27–38	13,688
September 3	6:00 p.m.	Presbyterian*		Fortera Stadium; Clarksville, TN	ESPN+	W 63–0	4,211
September 10	3:00 p.m.	Mississippi Valley State*		Fortera Stadium; Clarksville, TN	ESPN+	W 41–0	4,516
September 17	2:00 p.m.	at Alabama A&M*		Louis Crews Stadium; Normal, AL	Youtube	W 28–3	7,150
September 24	3:00 p.m.	No. 16 Eastern Kentucky		Fortera Stadium; Clarksville, TN	ESPN+	W 31–20	8,827
October 1	4:00 p.m.	at Central Arkansas	No. 22	Estes Stadium; Conway, AR	ESPN+	L 20–49	10,124
October 15	3:00 p.m.	Murray State*	No. 24	Fortera Stadium; Clarksville, TN	ESPN+	W 52–17	7,117
October 29	3:00 p.m.	Jacksonville State	No. 25	Fortera Stadium; Clarksville, TN	ESPN+	L 16–40	8,176
November 5	4:00 p.m.	at North Alabama		Braly Municipal Stadium; Florence, AL	ESPN+	W 38–35	5,235
November 12	12:00 p.m.	at Kennesaw State		Fifth Third Bank Stadium; Kennesaw, GA	ESPN+	W 31–14	5,201
November 19	11:00 a.m.	at No. 8 (FBS) Alabama*		Bryant–Denny Stadium; Tuscaloosa, AL	ESPN+/SECN+	L 0–34	99,369
*Non-conference game; Rankings from STATS Poll released prior to the game; All times are in Central time

== Game summaries ==
=== At Western Kentucky ===
	1	2	3	4	Total
Governors	10	7	3	7	27
Hilltoppers	7	14	0	17	38

Statistics	APSU	WKU
First downs	19	19
Total yards	319	388
Rushing yards	163	108
Passing yards	156	280
Turnovers	4	1
Time of possession	32:39	27:31

Team	Category	Player	Statistics
Austin Peay	Passing	Mike DiLiello	15/21, 156 yards, 2 TD, 2 INT
Austin Peay	Rushing	Josh Samuel	20 rushes, 77 yards
Austin Peay	Receiving	Drae McCray	6 receptions, 90 yards, 2 TD
Western Kentucky	Passing	Austin Reed	20/34, 280 yards, 4 TD, INT
Western Kentucky	Rushing	Davion Ervin-Poindexter	15 rushes, 49 yards
Western Kentucky	Receiving	Daewood Davis	6 receptions, 124 yards, TD

=== Presbyterian ===
	1	2	3	4	Total
Blue Hose	0	0	0	0	0
Governors	21	21	14	7	63

=== Mississippi Valley State ===
	1	2	3	4	Total
Delta Devils	0	0	0	0	0
Governors	21	20	0	0	41

=== At Alabama A&M ===
	1	2	3	4	Total
Governors	7	0	7	14	28
A&M Bulldogs	3	0	0	0	3

=== No. 16 Eastern Kentucky ===
	1	2	3	4	Total
No. 16 Colonels	10	10	0	0	20
Governors	3	0	7	21	31

=== At Central Arkansas ===
	1	2	3	4	Total
No. 22 Governors	0	6	7	7	20
Bears	7	0	21	21	49

=== Murray State ===
	1	2	3	4	Total
Racers	3	14	0	0	17
No. 24 Governors	21	14	10	7	52

=== Jacksonville State ===
	1	2	3	4	Total
Gamecocks	6	10	14	10	40
No. 25 Governors	7	9	0	0	16

=== At North Alabama ===
Austin Peay Governors (5-3) vs North Alabama Lions (1-7)

Quarter	1	2	3	4	Total
Governors	7	17	7	7	38
Lions	14	0	7	14	35

at Braly Municipal Stadium, Florence, AL

- Date: November 5th
- Game time: 4:00 pm
- Game weather: 66 °F (19 °C) • Weather: Cloudy • Wind: NW 2 MPH
- Game attendance: 5,235
- Referee: Doug Mercer
- TV: ESPN+

Statistics	Austin Peay	North Alabama
First downs	24	22
Plays–yards	73-544	80-463
Rushes–yards	218	260
Passing yards	326	203
Passing: comp–att–int	19-31-0	20-35-1
Turnovers		
Time of possession	23:47	36:13

Team	Category	Player	Statistics
Austin Peay	Passing	Mike DiLiello	19/31, 326 yards, 3 TD
Austin Peay	Rushing	CJ Evans Jr.	15 carries, 87 yards, 1 TD
Austin Peay	Receiving	Drae McCray	5 receptions, 106 yards, 1 TD
North Alabama	Passing	Noah Walters	20/35, 203 yards, 2 TD, 1 INT
North Alabama	Rushing	ShunDerrick Powell	23 carries, 207 yards, 2 TD
North Alabama	Receiving	Takairee Kenebrew	7 receptions, 78 yards, 1 TD

Scoring summary

Quarter	Time	Drive			Team	Scoring information	Score	
Quarter	Time	Plays	Yards	TOP	Team	Scoring information	Austin Peay	North Alabama
							0	0
"TOP" = time of possession. For other American football terms, see Glossary of American football.							0	0

=== At Kennesaw State ===
	1	2	3	4	Total
Governors	0	7	14	10	31
Owls	7	0	0	7	14

=== At No. 8 (FBS) Alabama ===
Team	1	2	3	4	Total
Austin Peay	0	0	0	0	0
• No. 8 Alabama	7	10	10	7	34

- Date: November 19
- Location: Tuscaloosa, AL
- Game start: 11:02 a.m.
- Game attendance: 99,639
- Game weather: 49, Sunny, Wind NW @ 3 mph
- Referee: Kyle Olson
- TV announcers (ESPN+/SECN+): Mike Morgan (play-by-play), Dave Steckel (color), Lauren Sisler (sideline)

Statistics	Austin Peay	Alabama
First downs	12	27
Total yards	206	527
Rushing yards	59	263
Passing yards	147	264
Turnovers	3	3
Time of possession	24:19	35:41

Team	Category	Player	Statistics
Austin Peay	Passing	Mike DiLiello	20/32, 147 yards, 2 INTs
Austin Peay	Rushing	CJ Evans Jr.	14 carries, 51 yards
Austin Peay	Receiving	Drae McCray	12 receptions, 92 yards
Alabama	Passing	Bryce Young	18/24, 221 yards, 2 TDs
Alabama	Rushing	Jase McClellan	17 carries, 156 yards, 2 TDs
Alabama	Receiving	Jermaine Burton	7 receptions, 128 yards, 2 TDs

Scoring summary

Quarter	Time	Drive			Team	Scoring information	Score	
Quarter	Time	Plays	Yards	TOP	Team	Scoring information	APU	ALA
1st	8:28	13	92	6:28	ALA	Jase McClellan (#2) 1-yard touchdown run, Will Reichard (#16) kick good	0	7
2nd	6:37	8	80	4:35	ALA	Jermaine Burton (#3) 4-yard touchdown reception from Bryce Young (#9), Will Reichard (#16) kick good	0	14
2nd	2:27	8	34	3:09	ALA	29-yard field goal by Will Reichard (#16)	0	17
3rd	8:43	3	65	0:58	ALA	Jase McClellan (#2) 9-yard touchdown run, Will Reichard (#16) kick good	0	24
3rd	4:57	5	17	2:16	ALA	30-yard field goal by Will Reichard (#16)	0	27
4th	13:20	8	66	3:29	ALA	Jermaine Burton (#3) 10-yard touchdown reception from Bryce Young (#9), Will Reichard (#16) kick good	0	34
"TOP" = time of possession. For other American football terms, see Glossary of American football.							APU 0	ALA 34

== Coaching staff ==
- Head Coach - Scotty Walden
- Assistant head coach/defensive coordinator/safeties coach - Chris Kappas
- Co-defensive coordinator/defensive backs coach - Akeem Davis
- Defensive Run-Game Coordinator/defensive line coach - Chris Jones
- Co-offensive coordinator/offensive line coach - Ryan Stanchek
- Pass-Game Coordinator/wide receivers coach - Lanear Sampson
- Co-Special teams coordinator/Gov Backs coach - Joe Pappalardo
- Co-Special teams coordinator/linebacker Coach - J.J. Clark
- Running backs coach - Jourdan McNeill
- Tight ends coach - Ryan Yurachek
