= Raymond Bright =

American football player and coach (1923–2008)

Biographical details
- Born: April 24, 1923; Hope, Arkansas, U.S.
- Died: June 24, 2008 (aged 85); Conway, Arkansas, U.S.

Playing career

Football
- 1944–1946: Arkansas State Teachers

Coaching career (HC unless noted)

Football
- 1951–1957: Conway HS (AR)
- 1958–1964: Arkansas State Teachers (assistant)
- 1965–1971: Arkansas State Teachers / State College of Arkansas

Administrative career (AD unless noted)
- 1951–1958: Conway HS (AR)

Head coaching record
- Overall: 33–30–3 (college); 47–27–2 (high school)

Accomplishments and honors

Championships
- 2 AIC (1965–1966)

Raymond E. Bright (April 24, 1923 – June 24, 2008) was an American football player and coach. He served as the head football coach at the University of Central Arkansas in Conway, Arkansas from 1965 to 1971, compiling a record of 33–30–3. Bright died in 2008.

== Head coaching record ==
=== College ===
Year	Team	Overall	Conference	Standing	Bowl/playoffs
Arkansas State Teachers / State College of Arkansas Bears (Arkansas Intercollegiate Conference) (1965–1971)
1965	Arkansas State Teachers	7–1–1	5–1–1	T–1st	
1966	Arkansas State Teachers	5–4	4–2	T–1st	
1967	State College of Arkansas	5–3–1	3–2–1	T–2nd	
1968	State College of Arkansas	7–3	3–3	T–4th	
1969	State College of Arkansas	5–5	3–3	4th	
1970	State College of Arkansas	2–8	1–5	6th	
1971	State College of Arkansas	2–6–1	0–5–1	7th	
Arkansas State Teachers / State College of Arkansas:		33–30–3	19–21–3		
Total:		33–30–3			
National championship Conference title Conference division title or championship game berth

=== High school ===
Year	Team	Overall	Conference	Standing	Bowl/playoffs
Conway Wampus Cats () (1951–1957)
1951	Conway	8–2			
1952	Conway	7–4			
1953	Conway	6–5			
1954	Conway	7–4			
1955	Conway	5–4–2	3–0		
1956	Conway	6–5	3–1		
1957	Conway	8–3	4–1		
Conway:		47–27–2	10–2		
Total:		47–27–2			
