= Nathan Brown (American football) =

American football player and coach (born 1986)

Central Arkansas Bears
- Title: Head coach

Personal information
- Born: August 19, 1986 (age 40); Hattiesburg, Mississippi, U.S.
- Listed height: 6 ft 2 in (1.88 m)
- Listed weight: 215 lb (98 kg)

Career information
- High school: Russellville (Russellville, Arkansas)
- College: Central Arkansas
- NFL draft: 2009: undrafted

Career history

Playing
- Jacksonville Jaguars (2009)*; New Orleans Saints (2009)*
- * Offseason or practice squad member only

Coaching
- Central Arkansas (2010–2013) Quarterbacks coach; Central Arkansas (2014–2017) Offensive coordinator & quarterbacks coach; Central Arkansas (2018–present) Head coach

Awards and highlights
- As head coach: 2024 AFCA FCS Region Number 3 Coach of the Year; 2022 ASUN Conference co-champion; 2020 Fall Southland Conference Coach of the Year; 2020 Guardian Credit Union FCS Kickoff Champion; 2019 Southland Conference co-champion; 2019 Eddie Robinson Coach of the Year Finalist; 2019 AFCA FCS Region Number 3 Coach of the Year finalist; As player: 2005 Gulf South Conference Freshman of the Year; 2007 Southland Conference Offensive Player of the Year; 2008 Southland Conference Player of the Year; 2009 East West Shrine Game invite; 2009 Senior Bowl invite; Named to the Southland Conference 2000's All Decade Team; 2026 Arkansas Sports Hall of Fame Inductee

Head coaching record
- Regular season: 48-49(.495) (College)
- Postseason: 0–1 (.000) (College)
- Career: 48-50(.490) (College)

Nathan Brown (August 19, 1986) is an American football coach and former player. He is head football coach at the University of Central Arkansas, a position he has held since the 2018 season.

== Early life ==
Born in Hattiesburg, Mississippi and raised in Russellville, Arkansas. He attended Russellville High School, where he was an All-State quarterback his senior season playing for head coach Jeff Holt. Brown was a three-year letterman at Russellville. His senior year he completed 242 of 353 passes for 3,385 yards and 33 TDs. He was named the KARV Dream Team Player of the Year, the Russellville Courier Dream Team and All-River Valley. Brown also lettered three years in baseball and was an All-State performer in 2003 and 2004. In his senior season he had a .417 batting average with 10 home runs and 44 RBIs at the plate and had a 7-1 record with an 2.15 era on the mound. He represented Russellville High School in the Arkansas Activities Association All Star baseball game in the summer of 2004. In February 2004 he signed a national letter of intent to play football and baseball at the University of Central Arkansas.

== College career ==
He was a record breaking quarterback at Central Arkansas. In addition to being a four-year starter, he was the Southland Conference Player of the Year in 2008 and the SLC Offensive Player of the Year in 2007. Brown was also a Walter Payton Award finalist in 2008 and was a three-time All-American for the Bears. Brown was also the first UCA player to play in the Senior Bowl in 2008. He was also selected to play in the East-West Shrine Game. He set state collegiate passing records for yards (10,558) and touchdowns (100), and led the Bears to the NCAA Division II quarterfinals as a redshirt freshman. Brown was the Gulf South Conference Freshman of the Year in 2005. Brown led the Bears to the 2005 Gulf South Conference championship, and the 2008 Southland Conference championship.

== Professional career ==
Pre-draft measurables
| Height | Weight | Arm length | Hand span | 40-yard dash | 10-yard split | 20-yard split | 20-yard shuttle | Three-cone drill | Vertical jump | Broad jump | Bench press |
|---|---|---|---|---|---|---|---|---|---|---|---|
| 6 ft 1 1/2 in (1.87 m) | 219 lb (99 kg) | 31 in (0.79 m) | 9 3/8 in (0.24 m) | 4.91 s | 1.81 s | 2.95 s | 4.24 s | 7.31 s | 30.5 in (0.77 m) | 9 ft 1 in (2.77 m) | 19 reps |
All values from NFL Combine

He was signed by the Jacksonville Jaguars as an undrafted free agent in 2009. After being released by the Jaguars he went to the New Orleans Saints for a short time.

Brown went into coaching after his short pro football stint, hired by his alma mater in 2009 to coach quarterbacks. In 2014 he was promoted to offensive coordinator for UCA.

On December 9, 2017, he was introduced as the new head coach of the UCA Bears football team, his first head coaching job.

== Head coaching record ==
| Year | Team | Overall | Conference | Standing | Bowl/playoffs | STATS^{#} | Coaches^{°} |
|---|---|---|---|---|---|---|---|
Central Arkansas Bears (Southland Conference) (2018–2020)
| 2018 | Central Arkansas | 6–5 | 5–4 | 3rd | | | |
| 2019 | Central Arkansas | 9–4 | 7–2 | T–1st | L NCAA Division I Second Round | 8 | 9 |
| 2020–21 | Central Arkansas | 5–4 | 0–0 | | | 13 | 10 |
Central Arkansas Bears (Western Athletic Conference) (2021)
| 2021 | Central Arkansas | 5–6 | 4–2 | 3rd | | | |
Central Arkansas Bears (ASUN Conference) (2022)
| 2022 | Central Arkansas | 5–6 | 3–2 | T–1st | | | |
Central Arkansas Bears (United Athletic Conference) (2023–present)
| 2023 | Central Arkansas | 7–4 | 4–2 | T–2nd | | 23 | 25 |
| 2024 | Central Arkansas | 6–6 | 4–4 | 4th | | | |
| 2025 | Central Arkansas | 3–9 | 2–6 | 7th | | | |
| 2026 | Central Arkansas | 2–6 | 0–3 | 8th | | | |
| Central Arkansas: | | 48–50 | 31–20 | | | | |
| Total: | | 48–50 | | | | | |
National championship Conference title Conference division title or championship game berth
