= Ryan Held (American football) =

American football player and coach (born 1974)

Current position
- Title: Head coach
- Team: Nebraska–Kearney
- Conference: MIAA
- Record: 14–19

Biographical details
- Born: November 23, 1974 (age 51); Kansas City, Missouri, U.S.

Playing career
- 1993–1996: Nebraska
- Positions: Quarterback, wide receiver

Coaching career (HC unless noted)
- 1997: Nebraska (SA)
- 1998–1999: Tennessee (GA)
- 2001: Peru State
- 2002–2004: Oklahoma Panhandle State
- 2005–2008: Southwestern Oklahoma State
- 2011: Butler (KS) (OC)
- 2012–2013: Highland
- 2014–2015: Northeastern Oklahoma A&M
- 2016–2017: UCF (RB)
- 2018–2021: Nebraska (RB)
- 2022: North Alabama (AHC/OC/QB)
- 2022: North Alabama (interim HC)
- 2023–present: Nebraska–Kearney

Head coaching record
- Overall: 49–74 (college); 17–22 (junior college)

Accomplishments and honors

Championships
- 1 LSC North Division (2007)

Ryan Held (born November 23, 1974) is an American college football coach. He is the head football coach for the University of Nebraska at Kearney, a position he has held since 2023. He was previously the running backs coach at University of Nebraska–Lincoln and was hired in that role in December 2017, after serving in that same position at the University of Central Florida in Orlando, Florida since 2016. Prior to that, he had served as the head coach at Peru State as well as several college and teams in Kansas and Oklahoma.

== Early life and playing career ==
Held was a two-time national champion himself as a Husker from 1993 to 1996. Nebraska posted a 47–3 record during Held’s career with three conference titles. At Nebraska, Held was a teammate of Scott Frost during the 1995 and 1996 seasons.

== Coaching career ==
=== First stint at Nebraska ===
As a senior at Nebraska, Held coached the Huskers as a student assistant in 1997, helping them to a 13–0 record and a national title.

=== Tennessee ===
As a defensive graduate assistant at Tennessee in 1998 and 1999, he was a part the Volunteers staff that won the 1998 national championship.

=== Peru State ===
In 2001, Held became the youngest head football coach in the country (age 26), and he led the Peru State Bobcats to a 5–5 record and a second-place league finish in his only season.

=== Oklahoma Pandhandle ===
In 2002, Held took over an Oklahoma Panhandle State Aggies program that had only won two games in the previous three years. He led them to back-to-back winning seasons in 2003 and 2004.

=== SW Oklahoma State ===
Held led the Southwestern Oklahoma State program for four seasons, from 2005 to 2008, guiding the team to a share of the Lone Star Conference North Division title in 2007, one year after he was named the division coach of the year.

=== Butler Community College ===
In 2011, Held was the offensive coordinator at Butler Community College where he led the team to an 11–1 record and finished as the #2 ranked offense in the country.

=== Highland Community College ===
In 2012, he took over a Highland Community College (Kansas) team that hadn't had a winning season since before 2000. In 2013, Highland made it to the playoffs for the first time in the modern era.

=== Northeast Oklahoma A&M ===
Held was the head coach for two seasons at Northeastern Oklahoma A&M College (2014–2015), where he coached 22 all-conference selections in his final season.

=== UCF ===
Held coached the running backs at UCF under head coach Scott Frost. He was part of a staff that led the nation’s most improved team in 2016 and posted the first perfect regular season in UCF and American Athletic Conference history in 2017. With help from Held’s running backs, the Knights’ offense showed dramatic improvement, increasing their scoring production by more than 35 points per game from 2015 to 2017 and their total offense output by more than 270 yards per game.

Held’s running backs helped UCF rush for nearly 2,500 yards during its undefeated regular season and run to the American Athletic Conference title in 2017. Adrian Killins Jr. averaged 6.8 yards per carry en route to earning all-conference accolades as a sophomore. Killins added 10 rushing touchdowns, including a 96-yard score in the regular-season matchup with Memphis, the longest rush and longest play from scrimmage in both UCF and AAC history. As a unit, Held’s running backs combined for 24 rushing touchdowns in 2017, including scores by six different backs. As a team, UCF ranked sixth nationally with 38 rushing touchdowns.

In Held’s first season at UCF in 2016, the Knights rushed for nearly 2,000 yards and three running backs, including more than 800 yards from freshmen. Killins averaged 6.5 yards per carry, while senior Dontravious Wilson scored eight rushing touchdowns after scoring only three times in his first three seasons combined.

=== Return to Nebraska ===
Held returned to his alma mater, Nebraska, in December 2017, when he was one of the first hires on Scott Frost's Husker staff. He was one of four offensive assistants dismissed on November 8, 2021, in a major reshuffle of the offensive staff.

=== North Alabama ===
In 2022, Held joined the staff at North Alabama as the associate head coach, offensive coordinator and quarterbacks coach. When head coach Chris Willis was fired after the team's 1-7 start, Held became the interim coach for the teams final three games, losing to Austin Peay, Tennessee Tech, and Memphis.

=== Nebraska-Kearney ===
Held was hired by the University of Nebraska-Kearney on December 20, 2022, after Josh Lynn departed for West Texas A&M. After two seasons below .500, the team achieved their first winning season under Held in 2025, going 6-5.

== Head coaching record ==
=== College ===
Year	Team	Overall	Conference	Standing	Bowl/playoffs
Peru State Bobcats (Central States Football League) (2001)
2001	Peru State	5–5	3–1	2nd	
Peru State:		5–5	3–1		
Oklahoma Panhandle State Aggies (NCAA Division II independent) (2002–2004)
2002	Oklahoma Panhandle State	2–9			
2003	Oklahoma Panhandle State	6–5			
2004	Oklahoma Panhandle State	6–5			
Oklahoma Panhandle State:		14–19			
Southwestern Oklahoma State Bulldogs (Lone Star Conference) (2005–2008)
2005	Southwestern Oklahoma State	1–10	0–9 / 0–5	13th / 6th (North)	
2006	Southwestern Oklahoma State	6–5	4–5 / 3–2	T–6th / T–2nd (North)	
2007	Southwestern Oklahoma State	6–5	4–5 / 3–2	6th / T–1st (North)	
2008	Southwestern Oklahoma State	3–8	1–8 / 1–4	T–11th / 5th (North)	
Southwestern Oklahoma State:		16–28	9–27		
North Alabama Lions (ASUN Conference) (2022)
2022	North Alabama	0–3	0–1	6th	
North Alabama:		0–3	0–1		
Nebraska–Kearney Lopers (Mid-America Intercollegiate Athletics Association) (2023–present)
2023	Nebraska–Kearney	3–8	2–8	9th	
2024	Nebraska–Kearney	5–6	3–6	7th	
2025	Nebraska–Kearney	6–5	4–5	T–6th	
Nebraska–Kearney:		14–19	9–19		
Total:		49–74			
National championship Conference title Conference division title or championship game berth

=== Junior college ===
Year	Team	Overall	Conference	Standing	Bowl/playoffs
Highland Scotties (Kansas Jayhawk Community College Conference) (2012–2013)
2012	Highland	2–7	1–6	7th	
2013	Highland	6–4	5–2	T–2nd	L Region VI Semifinal
Highland:		8–11	6–8		
Northeastern Oklahoma A&M Golden Norsemen (Southwest Junior College Football Conference) (2014–2015)
2014	Northeastern Oklahoma A&M	5–6	1–5	6th	
2015	Northeastern Oklahoma A&M	4–5	2–4	T–5th	
Northeastern Oklahoma A&M:		9–11	3–9		
Total:		17–22			
