= 2022 Central Arkansas Bears football team =

American college football season

2022 Central Arkansas Bears football

ASUN co-champion
- Conference: ASUN Conference
- Record: 5–6 (3–2 ASUN)
- Head coach: Nathan Brown (5th season)
- Offensive coordinator: Ken Collums (5th season)
- Offensive scheme: Spread
- Defensive coordinator: Matt Kitchens (2nd season)
- Base defense: 4–3
- Home stadium: Estes Stadium

2022 ASUN Conference football standings
	Conf.			Overall
Team	W		L	W		L
Jacksonville State*	5	–	0	9	–	2
Austin Peay +	3	–	2	7	–	4
Eastern Kentucky +^	3	–	2	7	–	5
Central Arkansas +	3	–	2	5	–	6
Kennesaw State	1	–	4	5	–	6
North Alabama	0	–	5	1	–	10
+ – Conference co-champions; ^ – FCS playoff participant; Note: Jacksonville State ineligible for postseason play and ASUN title due to start of transition to FBS.; Rankings from STATS Poll

2022 WAC–ASUN Challenge football standings
	Conf.			Overall
Team	W		L	W		L
Eastern Kentucky $^	4	–	1	7	–	5
Central Arkansas	4	–	1	5	–	6
Austin Peay	3	–	1	7	–	4
Stephen F. Austin	2	–	1	6	–	5
Abilene Christian	1	–	1	7	–	4
Kennesaw State	1	–	3	5	–	6
Southern Utah	0	–	3	5	–	6
North Alabama	0	–	4	1	–	10
$ – Conference champion; ^ – FCS playoff participant; Rankings from STATS Poll

The 2022 Central Arkansas Bears football team represented the University of Central Arkansas as a member of the ASUN Conference during the 2022 NCAA Division I FCS football season. The Bears were led by fifth-year head coach Nathan Brown and played their home games at Estes Stadium.

== Schedule ==
Date	Time	Opponent	Site	TV	Result	Attendance
September 1	7:00 p.m.	No. 5 Missouri State*	Estes Stadium; Conway, AR	ESPN+	L 14–27	10,277
September 10	6:00 p.m.	at No. 22 (FBS) Ole Miss*	Vaught–Hemingway Stadium; Oxford, MS	SECN+/ESPN+	L 3–59	58,373
September 17	2:00 p.m.	at Idaho State*	Holt Arena; Pocatello, ID	ESPN+	W 31–16	5,125
September 24	2:00 p.m.	at Southeast Missouri State*	Houck Stadium; Cape Girardeau, MO	ESPN+	L 27–35	3,756
October 1	4:00 p.m.	No. 22 Austin Peay	Estes Stadium; Conway, AR	ESPN+	W 49–20	10,124
October 8	4:00 p.m.	Lindenwood*	Estes Stadium; Conway, AR	ESPN+	L 49–52	6,647
October 15	12:00 p.m.	at Kennesaw State	Fifth Third Bank Stadium; Kennesaw, GA	ESPN+	W 51–24	4,467
October 29	4:00 p.m.	North Alabama	Estes Stadium; Conway, AR	ESPN+	W 64-29	4,253
November 5	4:00 p.m.	at Eastern Kentucky	Roy Kidd Stadium; Richmond, KY	ESPN+	L 14–42	9,164
November 12	4:00 p.m.	at Stephen F. Austin*	Homer Bryce Stadium; Nacogdoches, TX	ESPN+	W 34–7	7,456
November 19	4:00 p.m.	Jacksonville State	Estes Stadium; Conway, AR	ESPN+	L 17–40	5,229
*Non-conference game; Rankings from STATS Poll released prior to the game; All times are in Central time

== Game summaries ==
=== No. 5 Missouri State ===
	1	2	3	4	Total
No. 5 MSU Bears	0	17	3	7	27
UCR Bears	0	0	0	14	14

=== At No. 22 (FBS) Ole Miss ===
	1	2	3	4	Total
Bears	0	0	0	3	3
No. 22 (FBS) Rebels	28	3	21	7	59

=== At Idaho State ===
	1	2	3	4	Total
Bears	0	14	14	3	31
Bengals	3	0	0	13	16

=== At Southeast Missouri State ===
	1	2	3	4	Total
Bears	0	17	3	7	27
Redhawks	7	21	0	7	35

=== No. 22 Austin Peay ===
	1	2	3	4	Total
No. 22 Governors	0	6	7	7	20
Bears	7	0	21	21	49

=== Lindenwood ===
	1	2	3	4	Total
LU Lions	14	21	14	3	52
Bears	14	14	21	0	49

=== At Kennesaw State ===
	1	2	3	4	Total
Bears	7	20	7	17	51
Owls	7	3	7	7	24

=== North Alabama ===
	1	2	3	4	Total
NAU Lions	0	7	7	15	29
Bears	12	21	21	10	64

=== At Eastern Kentucky ===
	1	2	3	4	Total
Bears	0	7	0	7	14
Colonels	7	14	7	14	42

=== At Stephen F. Austin ===
	1	2	3	4	Total
Bears	7	13	14	0	34
Lumberjacks	0	0	0	7	7

=== Jacksonville State ===
	1	2	3	4	Total
Gamecocks	16	10	7	7	40
Bears	0	10	7	0	17
