= 2022 Abilene Christian Wildcats football team =

American college football season

2022 Abilene Christian Wildcats football

WAC co-champion
- Conference: Western Athletic Conference
- Record: 7–4 (3–1 WAC)
- Head coach: Keith Patterson (1st season)
- Offensive coordinator: Stephen Lee (1st season)
- Offensive scheme: Air raid
- Defensive coordinator: Skyler Cassity (1st season)
- Base defense: 3–4
- Home stadium: Anthony Field at Wildcat Stadium

2022 WAC–ASUN Challenge football standings
	Conf.			Overall
Team	W		L	W		L
Eastern Kentucky $^	4	–	1	7	–	5
Central Arkansas	4	–	1	5	–	6
Austin Peay	3	–	1	7	–	4
Stephen F. Austin	2	–	1	6	–	5
Abilene Christian	1	–	1	7	–	4
Kennesaw State	1	–	3	5	–	6
Southern Utah	0	–	3	5	–	6
North Alabama	0	–	4	1	–	10
$ – Conference champion; ^ – FCS playoff participant; Rankings from STATS Poll

2022 Western Athletic Conference football standings
	Conf.			Overall
Team	W		L	W		L
Stephen F. Austin +	3	–	1	6	–	5
Abilene Christian +	3	–	1	7	–	4
Sam Houston *	3	–	2	5	–	4
Utah Tech *	2	–	2	4	–	7
Tarleton State *	1	–	3	6	–	5
Southern Utah	1	–	3	5	–	6
+ – Conference co-champions; * Note: Sam Houston ineligible for WAC championship and FCS postseason play due to start of transition to FBS; Tarleton and Utah Tech ineligible for FCS postseason play due to transition from NCAA Division II.; Rankings from STATS Poll

The 2022 Abilene Christian Wildcats football team represented Abilene Christian University in the 2022 NCAA Division I FCS football season. The Wildcats played their home games at Anthony Field at Wildcat Stadium in Abilene, Texas, and competed in the Western Athletic Conference (WAC). They were led by first-year head coach Keith Patterson.

== Offseason ==
On November 21, 2021, the university announced that head coach Adam Dorrel had been fired. The Wildcats went 19–32 under Dorrel through five with only one winning season, a 6–5 campaign in 2018. On December 6, Texas Tech defensive coordinator Keith Patterson was hired as the Wildcats' new head coach.

== Preseason ==
=== WAC coaches' poll ===
WAC coaches' poll
Predicted finish	Team	Votes (1st place)
1	Stephen F. Austin	16 (4)
2	Abilene Christian	12
3	Tarleton	10 (1)
4	Southern Utah	7
5	Utah Tech	5

== Schedule ==
Date	Time	Opponent	Site	TV	Result	Attendance
September 1	7:00 p.m.	Lamar*	Anthony Field at Wildcat Stadium; Abilene, TX	ESPN+	W 28–14	5,413
September 10	7:00 p.m.	Prairie View A&M*	Anthony Field at Wildcat Stadium; Abilene, TX	ESPN+	W 21–13	6,236
September 17	11:00 a.m.	at Missouri*	Faurot Field; Columbia, MO	SECN+/ESPN+	L 17–34	53,253
September 24	7:00 p.m.	Western New Mexico*	Anthony Field at Wildcat Stadium; Abilene, TX	ESPN+	W 34–7	7,703
October 1	8:00 p.m.	at Utah Tech	Greater Zion Stadium; St. George, UT	ESPN+	W 26–10	3,718
October 8	6:00 p.m.	at Stephen F. Austin*	Homer Bryce Stadium; Nacogdoches, TX	ESPN+	L 38–41	7,224
October 15	3:25 p.m.	Southern Utah^{†}	Anthony Field at Wildcat Stadium; Abilene, TX	ESPN+	W 21–18	10,229
October 29	3:00 p.m.	at No. 23 North Dakota*	Alerus Center; Grand Forks, ND		L 31–34	8,355
November 5	7:00 p.m.	at Tarleton State	Memorial Stadium; Stephenville, TX	ESPN+	W 28–23	9,359
November 12	12:00 p.m.	at Sam Houston	Bowers Stadium; Huntsville, TX	ESPN+	W 45–28	7,592
November 19	2:30 p.m.	Stephen F. Austin	Anthony Field at Wildcat Stadium; Abilene, TX	ESPN+	L 21–24	7,508
*Non-conference game; ^{†}Homecoming; Rankings from STATS Poll released prior to the game; All times are in Central time

== Game summaries ==
=== Lamar ===
	1	2	3	4	Total
Cardinals	14	0	0	0	14
Wildcats	7	14	0	7	28

Statistics	LAM	ACU
First downs	7	25
Total yards	272	444
Rushing yards	68	186
Passing yards	204	258
Turnovers	1	0
Time of possession	19:40	40:20

Team	Category	Player	Statistics
Lamar	Passing	Mike Chandler II	8/24, 204 yards, 2 TD
Lamar	Rushing	Khalan Griffin	8 rushes, 39 yards
Lamar	Receiving	Sevonne Rhea	3 receptions, 113 yards, TD
Abilene Christian	Passing	Maverick McIvor	22/38, 258 yards, 2 TD
Abilene Christian	Rushing	Rovaughn Banks	18 rushes, 69 yards
Abilene Christian	Receiving	Kendall Catalon	7 receptions, 119 yards, TD

=== Prairie View A&M ===
	1	2	3	4	Total
Panthers	7	6	0	0	13
Wildcats	7	0	0	14	21

Statistics	PV	ACU
First downs	20	19
Total yards	333	335
Rushing yards	93	110
Passing yards	240	225
Turnovers	1	3
Time of possession	32:39	27:21

Team	Category	Player	Statistics
Prairie View A&M	Passing	Trazon Connley	20/37, 240 yards, TD, INT
Prairie View A&M	Rushing	Bernard Goodwater III	8 rushes, 39 yards
Prairie View A&M	Receiving	Jailon Howard	4 receptions, 75 yards, TD
Abilene Christian	Passing	Maverick McIvor	20/34, 225 yards, 2 TD, 3 INT
Abilene Christian	Rushing	Jermiah Dobbins	15 rushes, 61 yards
Abilene Christian	Receiving	Tristan Golightly	3 receptions, 63 yards

=== At Missouri ===
	1	2	3	4	Total
Wildcats	3	0	7	7	17
Tigers	14	3	14	3	34

Statistics	ACU	MIZ
First downs	11	18
Total yards	308	488
Rushing yards	109	191
Passing yards	199	297
Turnovers	2	1
Time of possession	25:50	34:10

Team	Category	Player	Statistics
Abilene Christian	Passing	Maverick McIvor	19/32, 199 yards, TD, INT
Abilene Christian	Rushing	Jermiah Dobbins	18 rushes, 73 yards
Abilene Christian	Receiving	Tristan Golightly	3 receptions, 50 yards
Missouri	Passing	Brady Cook	22/31, 297 yards, 3 TD
Missouri	Rushing	Cody Schrader	10 rushes, 55 yards
Missouri	Receiving	Dominic Lovett	7 receptions, 132 yards, 2 TD

=== Western New Mexico ===
	1	2	3	4	Total
Greyhounds	7	0	0	0	7
Wildcats	3	14	3	14	34

Statistics	WNMU	ACU
First downs	9	30
Total yards	167	469
Rushing yards	2	218
Passing yards	165	251
Turnovers	1	1
Time of possession	20:07	39:53

Team	Category	Player	Statistics
Western New Mexico	Passing	Devin Larsen	21/44, 165 yards, TD, INT
Western New Mexico	Rushing	Devin Larsen	4 rushes, 7 yards
Western New Mexico	Receiving	Jamon Chambers	4 receptions, 34 yards
Abilene Christian	Passing	Ethan Long	22/34, 251 yards, 2 TD
Abilene Christian	Rushing	Rovaughn Banks Jr.	21 rushes, 143 yards, 2 TD
Abilene Christian	Receiving	Kobe Clark	7 receptions, 92 yards, TD

=== At Utah Tech ===
	1	2	3	4	Total
Wildcats	0	6	7	13	26
Trailblazers	3	7	0	0	10

Statistics	ACU	UTU
First downs	26	15
Total yards	440	293
Rushing yards	200	172
Passing yards	240	121
Turnovers	1	2
Time of possession	36:00	24:00

Team	Category	Player	Statistics
Abilene Christian	Passing	Maverick McIvor	7/12, 148 yards
Abilene Christian	Rushing	Jermiah Dobbins	24 rushes, 130 yards, 3 TD
Abilene Christian	Receiving	Blayne Taylor	4 receptions, 70 yards
Utah Tech	Passing	Victor Gabalis	12/34, 121 yards, INT
Utah Tech	Rushing	Quali Conley	20 rushes, 148 yards, TD
Utah Tech	Receiving	Joey Hobert	5 receptions, 64 yards

=== At Stephen F. Austin ===
	1	2	3	4	Total
Wildcats	0	21	10	7	38
Lumberjacks	14	10	7	10	41

Statistics	ACU	SFA
First downs	30	21
Total yards	527	397
Rushing yards	244	154
Passing yards	283	243
Turnovers	1	2
Time of possession	32:21	27:39

Team	Category	Player	Statistics
Abilene Christian	Passing	Maverick McIvor	24/45, 283 yards, 2 TD, INT
Abilene Christian	Rushing	Jermiah Dobbins	31 rushes, 166 yards, 3 TD
Abilene Christian	Receiving	Tristan Golightly	4 receptions, 76 yards, TD
Stephen F. Austin	Passing	Trae Self	21/33, 243 yards, TD, INT
Stephen F. Austin	Rushing	Jerrell Wimbley	12 rushes, 99 yards, 2 TD
Stephen F. Austin	Receiving	Xavier Gibson	9 receptions, 144 yards

=== Southern Utah ===
	1	2	3	4	Total
Thunderbirds	0	3	7	8	18
Wildcats	7	7	0	7	21

Statistics	SUU	ACU
First downs	17	17
Total yards	375	280
Rushing yards	86	118
Passing yards	289	162
Turnovers	1	0
Time of possession	27:52	32:08

Team	Category	Player	Statistics
Southern Utah	Passing	Justin Miller	26/45, 289 yards, 2 TD, INT
Southern Utah	Rushing	Drake Fakahua	5 rushes, 27 yards
Southern Utah	Receiving	Isaiah Wooden	5 receptions, 117 yards, TD
Abilene Christian	Passing	Maverick McIvor	17/27, 162 yards, TD
Abilene Christian	Rushing	Jermiah Dobbins	21 rushes, 81 yards, TD
Abilene Christian	Receiving	Kobe Clark	6 receptions, 47 yards, TD

=== At No. 23 North Dakota ===
	1	2	3	4	Total
Wildcats	7	7	10	7	31
No. 23 Fighting Hawks	3	17	7	7	34

Statistics	ACU	UND
First downs	14	27
Total yards	361	463
Rushing yards	122	171
Passing yards	239	292
Turnovers	2	0
Time of possession	21:57	38:03

Team	Category	Player	Statistics
Abilene Christian	Passing	Maverick McIvor	21/32, 239 yards, 3 TD, 2 INT
Abilene Christian	Rushing	Jermiah Dobbins	6 rushes, 85 yards
Abilene Christian	Receiving	Tristan Golightly	5 receptions, 82 yards, TD
North Dakota	Passing	Tommy Schuster	23/32, 292 yards, 2 TD
North Dakota	Rushing	Tyler Hoosman	20 rushes, 112 yards, 2 TD
North Dakota	Receiving	Bo Belquist	7 receptions, 100 yards, TD

=== At Tarleton State ===
	1	2	3	4	Total
Wildcats	7	7	0	14	28
Texans	7	3	7	6	23

Statistics	ACU	TAR
First downs	17	23
Total yards	456	390
Rushing yards	68	209
Passing yards	388	181
Turnovers	2	0
Time of possession	28:09	31:51

Team	Category	Player	Statistics
Abilene Christian	Passing	Maverick McIvor	24/34, 384 yards, 3 TD, 2 INT
Abilene Christian	Rushing	Rovaughn Banks Jr.	8 rushes, 34 yards
Abilene Christian	Receiving	Tristan Golightly	7 receptions, 117 yards
Tarleton State	Passing	Beau Allen	16/27, 181 yards, 2 TD
Tarleton State	Rushing	Derrel Kelley III	18 rushes, 114 yards
Tarleton State	Receiving	Derrel Kelley III	5 receptions, 77 yards

=== At Sam Houston ===
	1	2	3	4	Total
Wildcats	21	17	0	7	45
Bearkats	7	7	8	6	28

Statistics	ACU	SHSU
First downs	24	16
Total yards	398	362
Rushing yards	136	43
Passing yards	262	319
Turnovers	1	4
Time of possession	38:43	21:17

Team	Category	Player	Statistics
Abilene Christian	Passing	Ethan Long	30/48, 262 yards, 4 TD, INT
Abilene Christian	Rushing	Anthony Smith	11 rushes, 59 yards, TD
Abilene Christian	Receiving	Kendall Catalon	4 receptions, 78 yards
Sam Houston	Passing	Keegan Shoemaker	23/46, 319 yards, 2 TD, 2 INT
Sam Houston	Rushing	Keegan Shoemaker	8 rushes, 29 yards, 2 TD
Sam Houston	Receiving	Cody Chrest	5 receptions, 117 yards

=== Stephen F. Austin ===
	1	2	3	4	Total
Lumberjacks	0	7	6	11	24
Wildcats	7	0	14	0	21

Statistics	SFA	ACU
First downs	19	14
Total yards	480	364
Rushing yards	83	44
Passing yards	397	320
Turnovers	1	0
Time of possession	34:40	25:20

Team	Category	Player	Statistics
Stephen F. Austin	Passing	Trae Self	26/37, 397 yards, 2 TD
Stephen F. Austin	Rushing	Miles Reed	23 rushes, 51 yards
Stephen F. Austin	Receiving	Xavier Gibson	11 receptions, 213 yards, TD
Abilene Christian	Passing	Maverick McIvor	25/38, 318 yards, 2 TD
Abilene Christian	Rushing	Rovaughn Banks Jr.	9 rushes, 57 yards
Abilene Christian	Receiving	Kobe Clark	7 receptions, 168 yards
