= 2022 Jacksonville State Gamecocks football team =

American college football season

2022 Jacksonville State Gamecocks football

ASUN champion
- Conference: ASUN Conference
- Record: 9–2 (5–0 ASUN)
- Head coach: Rich Rodriguez (1st season)
- Offensive coordinator: Rod Smith (1st season)
- Offensive scheme: Spread option
- Defensive coordinator: Zac Alley (1st season)
- Base defense: Multiple 4–2–5
- Home stadium: Burgess–Snow Field at JSU Stadium

2022 ASUN Conference football standings
	Conf.			Overall
Team	W		L	W		L
Jacksonville State*	5	–	0	9	–	2
Austin Peay +	3	–	2	7	–	4
Eastern Kentucky +^	3	–	2	7	–	5
Central Arkansas +	3	–	2	5	–	6
Kennesaw State	1	–	4	5	–	6
North Alabama	0	–	5	1	–	10
+ – Conference co-champions; ^ – FCS playoff participant; Note: Jacksonville State ineligible for postseason play and ASUN title due to start of transition to FBS.; Rankings from STATS Poll

The 2022 Jacksonville State Gamecocks football team represented Jacksonville State University in the 2022 NCAA Division I FCS football season. The Gamecocks competed in the ASUN Conference after the ASUN added football, scheduled for 2022. Led by first-year head coach Rich Rodriguez, Jacksonville State compiled an overall record of 9–2 with mark of 5–0 in conference play. The Gamecocks were ineligible for FCS postseason play and the ASUN champion title due to their transition to the NCAA Division I Football Bowl Subdivision (FBS). Jacksonville State defeated Central Arkansas and finished with the best record, remaining unbeaten in conference play. Jacksonville State declared themselves conference champions after the game.

The team played home games at Burgess–Snow Field at JSU Stadium in Jacksonville, Alabama.

On November 5, 2021, Jacksonsville State announced the football team will join Conference USA in 2023.

== Schedule ==
Date	Time	Opponent	Site	TV	Result	Attendance
August 27	2:30 p.m.	vs. No. 10 Stephen F. Austin*	Cramton Bowl; Montgomery, AL (FCS Kickoff)	ESPN	W 42–17	5,235
September 3	2:00 p.m.	Davidson*	Burgess–Snow Field at JSU Stadium; Jacksonville, AL	ESPN+	W 35–17	18,462
September 10	6:00 p.m.	at Murray State*	Roy Stewart Stadium; Murray, KY	ESPN3	W 34–3	6,911
September 17	6:00 p.m.	at Tulsa*	Skelly Field at H. A. Chapman Stadium; Tulsa, OK	ESPN+	L 17–54	17,311
September 24	4:00 p.m.	at Nicholls*	Manning Field at John L. Guidry Stadium; Thibodaux, LA	ESPN+	W 52–21	7,231
October 1	2:00 p.m.	Kennesaw State	Burgess–Snow Field at JSU Stadium; Jacksonville, AL	ESPN+	W 35–28 ^{OT}	19,654
October 15	6:00 p.m.	vs. North Alabama	Toyota Field; Madison, AL	ESPN+	W 47–31	10,124
October 22	2:00 p.m.	Southeastern Louisiana*^{†}	Burgess–Snow Field at JSU Stadium; Jacksonville, AL	ESPN+	L 14–31	18,654
October 29	3:00 p.m.	at No. 25 Austin Peay	Fortera Stadium; Clarksville, TN	ESPN+	W 40–16	8,176
November 12	2:00 p.m.	Eastern Kentucky	Burgess–Snow Field at JSU Stadium; Jacksonville, AL	ESPN+	W 42–17	15,875
November 19	4:00 p.m.	at Central Arkansas	Estes Stadium; Conway, AR	ESPN+	W 40–17	5,229
*Non-conference game; ^{†}Homecoming; Rankings from STATS Poll released prior to the game; All times are in Central time

== Game summaries ==
=== Vs. No. 10 Stephen F. Austin ===
	1	2	3	4	Total
Gamecocks	7	14	21	0	42
No. 10 Lumberjacks	7	10	0	0	17

=== Davidson ===
	1	2	3	4	Total
Wildcats	7	3	7	0	17
Gamecocks	7	21	0	7	35

=== At Murray State ===
	1	2	3	4	Total
Gamecocks	7	3	10	14	34
Racers	0	3	0	0	3

=== At Tulsa ===
Game Four – Jacksonville State Gamecocks (3–0) at Tulsa Golden Hurricane (1–1)

Quarter	1	2	3	4	Total
Gamecocks	0	3	7	7	17
Golden Hurricane	12	28	7	7	54

at Skelly Field at H. A. Chapman Stadium • Tulsa, OK

- Date: Saturday, September 17, 2022
- Game time: 6:00 p.m. CST
- Game weather: Cloudy • Temperature: 94 °F (34 °C) • Wind: S 13
- Game attendance: 17,311
- Referee: Edwin Lee
- TV: ESPN+

Game information

First quarter

- (8:27) TLSA – Steven Anderson 4 yard run, Zack Long kick (Drive: 14 plays, 75 yards, 6:33; Tulsa 7–0)
- (3:17) TLSA – Team safety (Tulsa 9–0)
- (1:19) TLSA – Zack Long 44 yard field goal (Drive: 6 plays, 49 yards, 1:58; Tulsa 12–0)

Second quarter

- (11:08) TLSA – Steven Anderson 4 yard run, Zack Long kick (Drive: 8 plays, 62 yards, 3:05; Tulsa 19–0)
- (8:27) TLSA – Jordan Ford 7 yard pass from Davis Brin, Zack Long kick (Drive: 5 plays, 72 yards, 1:48; Tulsa 26–0)
- (5:04) TLSA – JuanCarlos Santana 31 yard pass from Davis Brin, Zack Long kick (Drive: 6 plays, 64 yards, 2:22; Tulsa 33–0)
- (2:05) JSU – Alen Karajic 46 yard field goal (Drive: 11 plays, 47 yards, 2:59; Tulsa 33–3)
- (1:23) TLSA – Isaiah Epps 17 yard pass from Davis Brin, Zack Long kick (Drive: 3 plays, 79 yards, 0:37; Tulsa 40–3)

Third quarter

- (10:43) JSU – Zion Webb 3 yard run, Alen Karajic kick (Drive: 12 plays, 75 yards, 4:17; Tulsa 40–10)
- (6:05) TLSA – Keylon Stokes 46 yard pass from Davis Brin, Zack Long kick (Drive: 2 plays, 47 yards, 0:42; Tulsa 47–10)

Fourth quarter

- (9:27) TLSA – Marquis Shoulders 11 yard pass from Braylon Braxton, Zack Long kick (Drive: 6 plays, 64 yards, 3:29; Tulsa 54–10)
- (5:29) JSU – Te'Sean Smoot 16 yard run, Alen Karajic kick (Drive: 11 plays, 65 yards, 3:58; Tulsa 54–17)

Statistics	JSU	TLSA
First downs	17	29
Plays–yards	67–295	77–621
Rushes–yards	50–208	36–164
Passing yards	87	457
Passing: comp–att–int	7–17–1	32–41–0
Time of possession	24:00	36:00

Team	Category	Player	Statistics
Jacksonville State	Passing	Aaron McLaughlin	3/6, 47 yards, 1 INT
Jacksonville State	Rushing	Matt LaRoche	15 carries, 67 yards
Jacksonville State	Receiving	Michael Pettway	4 receptions, 47 yards
Tulsa	Passing	Davis Brin	27/35, 424 yards, 4 TD
Tulsa	Rushing	Bill Jackson	9 carries, 59 yards
Tulsa	Receiving	Keylon Stokes	9 receptions, 153 yards, 1 TD

=== At Nicholls ===
	1	2	3	4	Total
Gamecocks	14	21	17	0	52
Colonels	7	7	0	7	21

=== Kennesaw State ===
	1	2	3	4	OT	Total
Owls	7	14	0	7	0	28
Gamecocks	10	0	18	0	7	35

=== Vs. North Alabama ===
	1	2	3	4	Total
Gamecocks	21	10	10	6	47
Lions	0	14	14	3	31

=== Southeastern Louisiana ===
Southeastern Louisiana Lions at Jacksonville State Gamecocks

Quarter	1	2	3	4	Total
Lions	0	13	0	18	31
Gamecocks	0	14	0	0	14

at Burgess-Snow Field at JSU Stadium, Jacksonville, AL

- Date: October 22
- Game time: 1:00 p.m.
- Game weather: Sunny
- Game attendance: 18,654
- Referee: Garrett Dickerson
- TV: ESPN+

=== At No. 25 Austin Peay ===
	1	2	3	4	Total
Gamecocks	6	10	14	10	40
No. 25 Governors	7	9	0	0	16

=== Eastern Kentucky ===
	1	2	3	4	Total
Colonels	0	7	10	0	17
Gamecocks	7	14	14	7	42

=== At Central Arkansas ===
	1	2	3	4	Total
Gamecocks	16	10	7	7	40
Bears	0	10	7	0	17
