= 2022 Kennesaw State Owls football team =

American college football season

2022 Kennesaw State Owls football
- Conference: ASUN Conference
- Record: 5–6 (1–4 ASUN)
- Head coach: Brian Bohannon (8th season)
- Offensive coordinator: Grant Chesnut (8th season)
- Offensive scheme: Flexbone option
- Defensive coordinator: Danny Verpaele (3rd season)
- Base defense: 4–2–5
- Home stadium: Fifth Third Bank Stadium

2022 ASUN Conference football standings
	Conf.			Overall
Team	W		L	W		L
Jacksonville State*	5	–	0	9	–	2
Austin Peay +	3	–	2	7	–	4
Eastern Kentucky +^	3	–	2	7	–	5
Central Arkansas +	3	–	2	5	–	6
Kennesaw State	1	–	4	5	–	6
North Alabama	0	–	5	1	–	10
+ – Conference co-champions; ^ – FCS playoff participant; Note: Jacksonville State ineligible for postseason play and ASUN title due to start of transition to FBS.; Rankings from STATS Poll

2022 WAC–ASUN Challenge football standings
	Conf.			Overall
Team	W		L	W		L
Eastern Kentucky $^	4	–	1	7	–	5
Central Arkansas	4	–	1	5	–	6
Austin Peay	3	–	1	7	–	4
Stephen F. Austin	2	–	1	6	–	5
Abilene Christian	1	–	1	7	–	4
Kennesaw State	1	–	3	5	–	6
Southern Utah	0	–	3	5	–	6
North Alabama	0	–	4	1	–	10
$ – Conference champion; ^ – FCS playoff participant; Rankings from STATS Poll

The 2022 Kennesaw State Owls football team represented the Kennesaw State University as a new member of the ASUN Conference during the 2022 NCAA Division I FCS football season. Led by eighth-year head coach Brian Bohannon, the Owls played their home games at the Fifth Third Bank Stadium in Kennesaw, Georgia.

== Schedule ==
Date	Time	Opponent	Rank	Site	TV	Result	Attendance
September 1	7:00 p.m.	at Samford*	No. 8	Seibert Stadium; Homewood, AL	ESPN+	L 17–27	5,333
September 10	2:30 p.m.	at Cincinnati*	No. 19	Nippert Stadium; Cincinnati, OH	ESPN+	L 10–63	39,014
September 24	6:00 p.m.	Wofford*		Fifth Third Bank Stadium; Kennesaw, GA	ESPN+	W 24–22	7,154
October 1	2:00 p.m.	at Jacksonville State		Burgess–Snow Field at JSU Stadium; Jacksonville, AL	ESPN+	L 28–35 ^{OT}	19,654
October 8	6:00 p.m.	North Alabama		Fifth Third Bank Stadium; Kennesaw, GA	ESPN+	W 40–34 ^{2OT}	4,505
October 15	1:00 p.m.	Central Arkansas		Fifth Third Bank Stadium; Kennesaw, GA	ESPN+	L 24–51	4,467
October 22	3:00 p.m.	Tennessee Tech*^{†}		Fifth Third Bank Stadium; Kennesaw, GA	ESPN+	W 33–30 ^{OT}	7,906
October 29	1:00 p.m.	Charleston Southern*		Fifth Third Bank Stadium; Kennesaw, GA	ESPN+	W 30–20	3,845
November 5	1:00 p.m.	at No. 20 UT Martin*		Graham Stadium; Martin, TN	ESPN+	W 44–27	3,408
November 12	1:00 p.m.	Austin Peay		Fifth Third Bank Stadium; Kennesaw, GA	ESPN+	L 14–31	5,201
November 19	3:00 p.m.	at Eastern Kentucky		Roy Kidd Stadium; Richmond, KY	ESPN+	L 38-45	7,053
*Non-conference game; ^{†}Homecoming; Rankings from STATS Poll released prior to the game; All times are in Eastern time

== Game summaries ==
=== At Samford ===
	1	2	3	4	Total
No. 8 Owls	7	0	10	0	17
Bulldogs	0	14	0	13	27

=== At Cincinnati (FBS) ===
Game Two – No. 18 Kennesaw State (0–1) at Cincinnati Bearcats (FBS) (0–1)

Quarter	1	2	3	4	Total
No. 18 Owls	0	3	0	7	10
Bearcats (FBS)	7	14	21	21	63

at Nippert Stadium • Cincinnati, Ohio

- Date: Saturday, September 10, 2022
- Game time: 3:30 p.m. EDT
- Game weather: Sunny • Temperature: 79 °F (26 °C) • Wind: N/A
- Game attendance: 37,014
- Referee: Kevin Randall
- TV announcers (ESPN+): Tony Simeone (play-by-play) and Taylor McHargue (analyst)
- Game summary: ESPN

Game information

First quarter

- (5:35) Cincinnati – Josh Whyle 17 yard pass from Ben Bryant, Ryan Coe kick (Drive: 5 plays, 41 yards, 1:31; Cincinnati 7–0)

Second quarter

- (12:59) Cincinnati – Leonard Taylor 9 yard pass from Ben Bryant, Ryan Coe kick (Drive: 11 plays, 71 yards, 4:27; Cincinnati 14–0)
- (9:59) Cincinnati – Tyler Scott 21 yard pass from Ben Bryant, Ryan Coe kick (Drive: 4 plays, 34 yards, 1:12; Cincinnati 21–0)
- (4:20) Kennesaw State – Nathan Robertson 40 yard field goal (Drive: 4 plays, 7 yards, 1:41; Cincinnati 21–3)

Third quarter

- (14:15) Cincinnati – Jabari Taylor 23 yard fumble recovery, Ryan Coe kick (Cincinnati 28–3)
- (7:50) Cincinnati – Charles McClelland 5 yard run, Ryan Coe kick (Drive: 10 plays, 68 yards, 4:15; Cincinnati 35–3)
- (4:34) Cincinnati – Ja'Von Hicks 45 Interception return, Ryan Coe kick (Cincinnati 42–3)

Fourth quarter

- (14:11) Cincinnati – Corey Kiner 12 yard run, Ryan Coe kick (Drive: 6 plays, 77 yards, 1:31; Cincinnati 49–3)
- (9:26) Kennesaw State – Preston Daniels 4 yard run, Ryan Coe kick (Drive: 10 plays, 75 yards, 4:45; Cincinnati 49–10)
- (7:44) Cincinnati – Evan Prater 44 yard run, Ryan Coe kick (Drive: 4 plays, 88 yards, 1:42; Cincinnati 56–10)
- (3:36) Cincinnati – Myles Montgomery 76 yard run, Ryan Coe kick (Drive: 1 plays, 76 yards, 0:11; Cincinnati 63–10)

Statistics	KSU	CIN
First downs	15	24
Plays–yards	76–253	53–525
Rushes–yards	61–142	30–232
Passing yards	111	293
Passing: comp–att–int	7–15–1	20–23–0
Turnovers		
Time of possession	38:08	21:52

Team	Category	Player	Statistics
Kennesaw State	Passing	Xavier Shepard	4–11, 60 yards, 0 TD, 1 INT
Kennesaw State	Rushing	Preston Daniels	21 carries, 59 yards, 1 TD
Kennesaw State	Receiving	Iaan Cousin	4 receptions, 71 yards
Cincinnati	Passing	Ben Bryant	16–19, 201 yards, 3 TD
Cincinnati	Rushing	Myles Montgomery	5 carries, 104 yards 1 TD
Cincinnati	Receiving	Jadon Thompson	4 receptions, 68 yards

=== Wofford ===
	1	2	3	4	Total
Terriers	6	3	0	13	22
Owls	14	0	7	3	24

=== At Jacksonville State ===
	1	2	3	4	OT	Total
Owls	7	14	0	7	0	28
Gamecocks	10	0	18	0	7	35

=== North Alabama ===
	1	2	3	4	OT	2OT	Total
Lions	3	3	7	14	7	0	34
Owls	7	3	7	10	7	6	40

=== Central Arkansas ===
	1	2	3	4	Total
Bears	7	20	7	17	51
Owls	7	3	7	7	24

=== Tennessee Tech ===
	1	2	3	4	OT	Total
Golden Eagles	0	10	10	7	3	30
Owls	7	10	0	10	6	33

=== Charleston Southern ===
	1	2	3	4	Total
Buccaneers	0	7	7	6	20
Owls	3	10	7	10	30

=== At No. 20 UT Martin ===
	1	2	3	4	Total
Skyhawks	0	24	3	0	27
Owls	10	7	7	20	44

=== Austin Peay ===
	1	2	3	4	Total
Governors	0	7	14	10	31
Owls	7	0	0	7	14

=== At Eastern Kentucky ===
	1	2	3	4	Total
Owls	14	0	10	14	38
Colonels	9	14	15	7	45
