= 2025 Central Arkansas Bears football team =

American college football season

2025 Central Arkansas Bears football
- Conference: United Athletic Conference
- Record: 3–9 (2–6 UAC)
- Head coach: Nathan Brown (8th season)
- Defensive coordinator: Chad Williams (3rd season)
- Home stadium: Estes Stadium

2025 United Athletic Conference standings
	Conf.			Overall
Team	W		L	W		L
No. 12 Abilene Christian +^	7	–	1	9	–	5
No. 6 Tarleton State +^	7	–	1	12	–	2
Southern Utah	6	–	2	7	–	5
West Georgia*	5	–	3	8	–	3
Austin Peay	4	–	4	7	–	5
Eastern Kentucky	3	–	5	5	–	7
Central Arkansas	2	–	6	3	–	9
Utah Tech	1	–	7	2	–	10
North Alabama	1	–	7	2	–	10
+ – Conference co-champions; ^ – FCS playoff participant; * – Ineligible for the UAC title and FCS postseason play due to transition from NCAA Division II.; Rankings from STATS Poll

The 2025 Central Arkansas Bears football team represented the University of Central Arkansas as a member of the United Athletic Conference (UAC) during the 2025 NCAA Division I FCS football season. The Bears were led by eighth-year head coach Nathan Brown and played their home games at the Estes Stadium in Conway, Arkansas.

Central Arkansas hired former professional quarterback and West Jefferson High School offensive coordinator Chase Fourcade as the team's quarterbacks coach, taking over for former offensive coordinator, Ken Collums who moved into a different role.

== Schedule ==
Date	Time	Opponent	Site	TV	Result	Attendance
August 28	6:30 p.m.	at Missouri*	Faurot Field; Columbia, MO	SECN	L 6–61	62,621
September 6	6:00 p.m.	Arkansas–Pine Bluff*	Estes Stadium; Conway, AR	ESPN+	W 41–17	9,279
September 13	6:00 p.m.	No. 3 Tarleton State	Estes Stadium; Conway, AR	ESPN+	L 10–56	6,374
September 20	8:30 p.m.	at No. 24 Sacramento State*	Hornet Stadium; Sacramento, CA	ESPN+	L 16–45	13,253
September 27	6:00 p.m.	at No. 22 Lamar*	Provost Umphrey Stadium; Beaumont, TX	ESPN+	L 32–35	6,326
October 4	4:00 p.m.	Utah Tech	Estes Stadium; Conway, AR	ESPN+	W 23–17	3,871
October 11	3:00 p.m.	at North Alabama	Braly Municipal Stadium; Florence, AL	ESPN+	W 49–21	9,125
October 25	1:00 p.m.	at West Georgia	University Stadium; Carrollton, GA	ESPN+	L 17–18	5,349
November 1	4:00 p.m.	Eastern Kentucky^{†}	Estes Stadium; Conway, AR	ESPN+	L 13–34	5,953
November 8	3:00 p.m.	at Austin Peay	Fortera Stadium; Clarksville, TN	ESPN+	L 38–41	5,345
November 15	7:30 p.m.	at Southern Utah	Eccles Coliseum; Cedar City, UT	ESPN+	L 21–28	3,257
November 22	4:00 p.m.	No. 17 Abilene Christian	Estes Stadium; Conway, AR	ESPN+	L 28–49	4,736
*Non-conference game; ^{†}Homecoming; Rankings from STATS Poll released prior to the game; All times are in Central time

== Game summaries ==
=== at Missouri (FBS) ===
Central Arkansas Bears (0–0) at Missouri Tigers (FBS) (0–0) – Game summary

Quarter	1	2	3	4	Total
Bears	0	0	0	6	6
Tigers (FBS)	9	17	14	21	61

at Faurot Field • Columbia, Missouri

- Date: August 28
- Game time: 6:30 p.m.
- Game weather: 82 degrees, sunny, E 5 mph
- Game attendance: 57,321 (sellout)
- Referee: James Carter
- TV announcers (SECN): Lowell Galindo (play-by-play) and Aaron Murray (analyst)

Game information

First quarter

- (11:06) MIZ: Marquis Johnson 49-yard pass from Beau Pribula (Two-point run conversion failed) (Drive: 4 plays, 64 yards, 2:12; Missouri 6–0)
- (2:22) MIZ: Blake Craig 49-yard field goal (Drive: 10 plays, 50 yards, 4:29; Missouri 9–0)

Second quarter

- (9:33) MIZ: Blake Craig 55-yard field goal (Drive: 14 plays, 35 yards, 6:05; Missouri 12–0)
- (6:48) MIZ: Beau Pribula 31-yard run (Blake Craig kick) (Drive: 2 plays, 33 yards, 0:53; Missouri 19–0)
- (0:08) MIZ: Brett Norfleet 1-yard pass from Beau Pribula (Blake Craig kick) (Drive: 15 plays, 99 yards, 3:30; Missouri 26–0)

Third quarter

- (11:23) MIZ: Ahmad Hardy 4-yard run (Blake Craig kick) (Drive: 7 plays, 85 yards, 3:27; Missouri 33–0)
- (4:54) MIZ: Beau Pribula-1 yard run (Robert Meyer kick) (Drive: 7 plays, 99 yards, 3:09; Missouri 40–0)

Fourth quarter

- (11:05) MIZ: Jude James 40-yard pass from Matt Zollers (Robert Meyer kick) (Drive: 4 plays, 54 yards, 1:51; Missouri 47–0)
- (7:32) MIZ: Marquise Davis 3-yard run (Robert Meyer kick) (Drive: 4 plays, 14 yards, 2:00; Missouri 54–0)
- (2:48) MIZ: Dante McClellan 83-yard interception return (Robert Meyer kick) (Missouri 61-0)
- (0:22) CARK: Manny Smith 3-yard pass from Luther Richesson (Two-point run conversion failed) (Drive: 10 plays, 63 yards, 2:21; Missouri 61–6)

Statistics	CARK	MIZ
First downs	15	25
Plays–yards	62–227	68–562
Rushes–yards	39–154	37–221
Passing yards	73	341
Passing: comp–att–int	13–23–1	26–31–0
Turnovers	2	0
Time of possession	29:51	30:09

Team	Category	Player	Statistics
Central Arkansas	Passing	Luther Richesson	13/23, 73 yards, TD, INT
Central Arkansas	Rushing	Landen Chambers	15 carries, 63 yards
Central Arkansas	Receiving	Malachi Henry	3 receptions, 18 yards
Missouri	Passing	Beau Pribula	23/28, 283 yards, 2 TD
Missouri	Rushing	Ahmad Hardy	10 carries, 100 yards, TD
Missouri	Receiving	Marquis Johnson	5 receptions, 134 yards, TD

=== Arkansas–Pine Bluff ===
Arkansas–Pine Bluff Golden Lions (0-1) vs. Central Arkansas Bears (0-1) – Game summary

Quarter	1	2	3	4	Total
Golden Lions	7	3	0	7	17
Bears	6	14	7	14	41

at Estes Stadium • Conway, AR

- Date: September 6
- Game time: 6:00 p.m.
- Game weather: Sunny
- Game attendance: 9,279
- Referee: Matt Jones
- TV announcers (ESPN+): Dylan McLemore (play-by-play) and Wess Moore (analyst)

Statistics	UAPB	CARK
First downs		
Total yards		
Rushing yards		
Passing yards		
Passing: Comp–Att–Int		
Time of possession		

Team	Category	Player	Statistics
Arkansas–Pine Bluff	Passing		
Arkansas–Pine Bluff	Rushing		
Arkansas–Pine Bluff	Receiving		
Central Arkansas	Passing		
Central Arkansas	Rushing		
Central Arkansas	Receiving		

=== No. 3 Tarleton State ===
No. 3 Tarleton State Texans (3-0) vs. Central Arkansas Bears (1-1) – Game summary

Quarter	1	2	3	4	Total
No. 3 Texans	21	21	7	7	56
Bears	0	7	0	3	10

at Estes Stadium • Conway, AR

- Date: September 13
- Game time: 6:00 p.m.
- Game weather: Sunny
- Game attendance: 6,374
- Referee: Zachary Erdmann
- TV announcers (ESPN+): Dylan McLemore (play-by-play) and Wess Moore (analyst)

Statistics	TAR	CARK
First downs		
Total yards		
Rushing yards		
Passing yards		
Passing: Comp–Att–Int		
Time of possession		

Team	Category	Player	Statistics
Tarleton State	Passing		
Tarleton State	Rushing		
Tarleton State	Receiving		
Central Arkansas	Passing		
Central Arkansas	Rushing		
Central Arkansas	Receiving		

=== at No. 24 Sacramento State ===
Central Arkansas Bears (1–2) at No. 24 Sacramento State Hornets (1–2) – Game summary

Quarter	1	2	3	4	Total
Bears	0	6	0	10	16
No. 24 Hornets	21	7	10	7	45

at Hornet Stadium • Sacramento, CA

- Date: September 20
- Game time: 8:00 p.m. CDT
- Game weather: Sunny • Temperature: 87 °F (31 °C) • Wind: SW at 5 miles per hour (8.0 km/h)
- Game attendance: 13,253
- Referee: Robert Quello
- TV announcers (ESPN+): Jason Ross (play-by-play) and Darren Arbet (analyst)

Game information

First quarter

- SAC – Rodney Hammond Jr. 8-yard run (Grant Meadors kick), 11:11. Hornets 7–0. Drive: 8 plays, 85 yards, 3:46.
- SAC – Sam Adams II 9-yard pass from Cardell Williams (Grant Meadors kick), 4:14. Hornets 14–0. Drive: 6 plays, 78 yards, 2:59.
- SAC – Damian Henderson II 85-yard run (Grant Meadors kick), 1:14. Hornets 21–0. Drive: 2 plays, 80 yards, 0:19.

Second quarter

- SAC – Cardell Williams 3-yard run (Grant Meadors kick), 5:12. Hornets 28–0. Drive: 8 plays, 50 yards, 4:06.
- CARK – Tyrell Pollard 18-yard pass from Luther Richesson (Caleb Jones kick failed), 0:17. Hornets 28–6. Drive: 16 plays, 87 yards, 4:50.

Third quarter

- SAC – Cardell Williams 21-yard run (Grant Meadors kick), 8:09. Hornets 35–6. Drive: 8 plays, 88 yards, 3:31.
- SAC – Grant Meadors 27-yard field goal, 0:03. Hornets 38–6. Drive: 11 plays, 67 yards, 5:35.

Fourth quarter

- CARK – Landen Chambers 1-yard run (Caleb Jones kick), 12:37. Hornets 38–13. Drive: 7 plays, 75 yards, 2:26.
- CARK – Caleb Jones 38-yard field goal, 10:29. Hornets 38–16. Drive: 4 plays, -5 yards, 2:01.
- SAC – Ernest Campbell 50-yard pass from Jaden Rashada (Grant Meadors kick), 8:01. Hornets 45–16. Drive: 5 plays, 86 yards, 2:18.

Statistics	CARK	SAC
First downs	19	19
Plays–yards	70–282	61–602
Rushes–yards	44–87	39–262
Passing yards	195	340
Passing: Comp–Att–Int	17–26–0	17–22–0
Turnovers	0	1
Time of possession	30:19	29:41

Team	Category	Player	Statistics
Central Arkansas	Passing	Luther Richesson	17/26, 195 yards, TD
Central Arkansas	Rushing	Landen Chambers	22 carries, 108 yards, TD
Central Arkansas	Receiving	Tyrell Pollard	4 receptions, 84 yards, TD
Sacramento State	Passing	Cardell Williams	15/20, 252 yards, TD
Sacramento State	Rushing	Damian Henderson II	15 carries, 137 yards, TD
Sacramento State	Receiving	Jordan Anderson	3 receptions, 98 yards

=== at No. 22 Lamar ===
Central Arkansas Bears (1-3) vs. No. 22 Lamar Cardinals (2-1) – Game summary

Quarter	1	2	3	4	Total
Bears	14	3	0	15	32
No. 22 Cardinals	17	7	14	0	38

at Provost Umphrey Stadium • Beaumont, TX

- Date: September 27
- Game time: 6:00 p.m. CDT
- Game weather: Sunny • Temperature: 85 °F (29 °C) • Wind: NE at 6 miles per hour (9.7 km/h)
- Game attendance: 6,326
- Referee: James Brookhart
- TV announcers (ESPN+): Dan Gresham (play-by-play) and Lemont Williams (analyst)

Statistics	CARK	LAM
First downs		
Total yards		
Rushing yards		
Passing yards		
Passing: Comp–Att–Int		
Time of possession		

Team	Category	Player	Statistics
Central Arkansas	Passing		
Central Arkansas	Rushing		
Central Arkansas	Receiving		
Lamar	Passing		
Lamar	Rushing		
Lamar	Receiving		

=== Utah Tech ===
Utah Tech Trailblazers (1-4) vs. Central Arkansas Bears (1-4) – Game summary

Quarter	1	2	3	4	Total
Trailblazers	0	10	7	0	17
Bears	0	10	10	3	23

at Estes Stadium • Conway, AR

- Date: October 4
- Game time: 4:00 p.m. CDT
- Game weather: Sunny
- Game attendance: 3,871
- Referee: Drew Myers
- TV announcers (ESPN+): Dylan McLemore (play-by-play) and Wess Moore (analyst)

Statistics	UTU	CARK
First downs		
Total yards		
Rushing yards		
Passing yards		
Passing: Comp–Att–Int		
Time of possession		

Team	Category	Player	Statistics
Utah Tech	Passing		
Utah Tech	Rushing		
Utah Tech	Receiving		
Central Arkansas	Passing		
Central Arkansas	Rushing		
Central Arkansas	Receiving		

=== at North Alabama ===
Central Arkansas Bears (2-4) vs. North Alabama Lions (1-4) – Game summary

Quarter	1	2	3	4	Total
Bears	7	28	7	7	49
Lions	7	7	0	7	21

at Braly Municipal Stadium • Florence, AL

- Date: October 11
- Game time: 3:00 p.m.
- Game weather: Sunny • Temperature: 79 °F (26 °C) • Wind: SW at 4 miles per hour (6.4 km/h)
- Game attendance: 9,125
- Referee: Jeremee Tate
- TV announcers (ESPN+): Benjamin Ray (play-by-play), Bryan Neece (analyst) and Lynden Blake (sideline)

Statistics	CARK	UNA
First downs		
Total yards		
Rushing yards		
Passing yards		
Passing: Comp–Att–Int		
Time of possession		

Team	Category	Player	Statistics
Central Arkansas	Passing		
Central Arkansas	Rushing		
Central Arkansas	Receiving		
North Alabama	Passing		
North Alabama	Rushing		
North Alabama	Receiving		

=== at West Georgia ===
Central Arkansas Bears (3-4) vs. West Georgia Wolves (5-3) – Game summary

Quarter	1	2	3	4	Total
Bears	0	14	3	0	17
Wolves	0	3	3	12	18

at University Stadium • Carrollton, GA

- Date: October 25
- Game time: 2:00 PM EDT
- Game weather: Sunny • Temperature: 69 °F (21 °C)
- Game attendance: 5,349
- Referee: Matthew Jones
- TV announcers (ESPN+): Patrick Eldson (play-by-play) and Parker Gore (analyst)

Statistics	CARK	UWG
First downs		
Total yards		
Rushing yards		
Passing yards		
Passing: Comp–Att–Int		
Time of possession		

Team	Category	Player	Statistics
Central Arkansas	Passing		
Central Arkansas	Rushing		
Central Arkansas	Receiving		
West Georgia	Passing		
West Georgia	Rushing		
West Georgia	Receiving		

=== Eastern Kentucky ===
Eastern Kentucky Colonels (3-5) vs. Central Arkansas Bears (3-5) – Game summary

Quarter	1	2	3	4	Total
Colonels	-	-	-	-	0
Bears	-	-	-	-	0

at Estes Stadium • Conway, AR

- Date: November 1
- Game time: 4:00 p.m
- TV announcers (ESPN+): Dylan McLemore (play-by-play) and Wess Moore (analyst)

Statistics	EKU	CARK
First downs		
Total yards		
Rushing yards		
Passing yards		
Passing: Comp–Att–Int		
Time of possession		

Team	Category	Player	Statistics
Eastern Kentucky	Passing		
Eastern Kentucky	Rushing		
Eastern Kentucky	Receiving		
Central Arkansas	Passing		
Central Arkansas	Rushing		
Central Arkansas	Receiving		

=== at Austin Peay ===
Central Arkansas Bears (3-6) vs. Austin Peay Governors (5-4) – Game summary

Quarter	1	2	3	4	Total
Bears	-	-	-	-	0
Governors	-	-	-	-	0

at Fortera Stadium • Clarksville, TN

- Date: November 8

Statistics	CARK	APSU
First downs		
Total yards		
Rushing yards		
Passing yards		
Passing: Comp–Att–Int		
Time of possession		

Team	Category	Player	Statistics
Central Arkansas	Passing		
Central Arkansas	Rushing		
Central Arkansas	Receiving		
Austin Peay	Passing		
Austin Peay	Rushing		
Austin Peay	Receiving		

=== at Southern Utah ===
Central Arkansas Bears (0-0) vs. Southern Utah Thunderbirds (0-0) – Game summary

Quarter	1	2	3	4	Total
Bears	-	-	-	-	0
Thunderbirds	-	-	-	-	0

at Eccles Coliseum • Cedar City, UT

- Date: November 15

Statistics	CARK	SUU
First downs		
Total yards		
Rushing yards		
Passing yards		
Passing: Comp–Att–Int		
Time of possession		

Team	Category	Player	Statistics
Central Arkansas	Passing		
Central Arkansas	Rushing		
Central Arkansas	Receiving		
Southern Utah	Passing		
Southern Utah	Rushing		
Southern Utah	Receiving		

=== No. 17 Abilene Christian ===
No. 17 Abilene Christian Wildcats (7-4) vs. Central Arkansas Bears (3-8) – Game summary

Quarter	1	2	3	4	Total
No. 17 Wildcats	-	-	-	-	0
Bears	-	-	-	-	0

at Estes Stadium • Conway, AR

- Date: November 22

Statistics	ACU	CARK
First downs		
Total yards		
Rushing yards		
Passing yards		
Passing: Comp–Att–Int		
Time of possession		

Team	Category	Player	Statistics
Abilene Christian	Passing		
Abilene Christian	Rushing		
Abilene Christian	Receiving		
Central Arkansas	Passing		
Central Arkansas	Rushing		
Central Arkansas	Receiving		
