= 2025 Eastern Kentucky Colonels football team =

American college football season

2025 Eastern Kentucky Colonels football
- Conference: United Athletic Conference
- Record: 5–7 (3–5 UAC)
- Head coach: Walt Wells (6th season)
- Offensive coordinator: Andy Richman (6th season)
- Defensive coordinator: Jake Johnson (6th season)
- Home stadium: Roy Kidd Stadium

2025 United Athletic Conference standings
	Conf.			Overall
Team	W		L	W		L
No. 12 Abilene Christian +^	7	–	1	9	–	5
No. 6 Tarleton State +^	7	–	1	12	–	2
Southern Utah	6	–	2	7	–	5
West Georgia*	5	–	3	8	–	3
Austin Peay	4	–	4	7	–	5
Eastern Kentucky	3	–	5	5	–	7
Central Arkansas	2	–	6	3	–	9
Utah Tech	1	–	7	2	–	10
North Alabama	1	–	7	2	–	10
+ – Conference co-champions; ^ – FCS playoff participant; * – Ineligible for the UAC title and FCS postseason play due to transition from NCAA Division II.; Rankings from STATS Poll

The 2025 Eastern Kentucky Colonels football team represented Eastern Kentucky University as a member of the United Athletic Conference (UAC) during the 2025 NCAA Division I FCS football season. The Colonels were led by sixth-year head coach Walt Wells and played at Roy Kidd Stadium in Richmond, Kentucky.

== Schedule ==
Date	Time	Opponent	Site	TV	Result	Attendance
August 30	3:00 p.m.	at Louisville*	L&N Federal Credit Union Stadium; Louisville, KY	ACCN	L 17–51	50,536
September 6	6:00 p.m.	Houston Christian*	Roy Kidd Stadium; Richmond, KY	ESPN+	W 20–10	5,193
September 13	6:00 p.m.	at Marshall*	Joan C. Edwards Stadium; Huntington, WV	ESPN+	L 7–38	23,925
September 20	6:00 p.m.	at No. 22 West Georgia	University Stadium; Carrollton, GA	ESPN+	L 12–33	4,378
September 27	6:00 p.m.	Nicholls*	Roy Kidd Stadium; Richmond, KY	ESPN+	W 27–7	8,239
October 11	6:00 p.m.	No. 16 Austin Peay	Roy Kidd Stadium; Richmond, KY	ESPN+	W 34–20	5,753
October 18	7:00 p.m.	at North Alabama	Braly Municipal Stadium; Florence, AL	ESPN+	L 14–35	8,922
October 25	3:00 p.m.	No. 3 Tarleton State^{†}	Roy Kidd Stadium; Richmond, KY	ESPN+	L 7–31	6,448
November 1	5:00 p.m.	at Central Arkansas	Estes Stadium; Conway, AR	ESPN+	W 34–13	5,953
November 8	3:00 p.m.	Southern Utah	Roy Kidd Stadium; Richmond, KY	ESPN+	L 17–27	4,093
November 15	3:00 p.m.	No. 18 Abilene Christian	Roy Kidd Stadium; Richmond, KY	ESPN+	L 10–17	4,067
November 22	4:00 p.m.	at Utah Tech	Greater Zion Stadium; St. George, UT	ESPN+	W 33–10	2,757
*Non-conference game; ^{†}Homecoming; Rankings from STATS Poll released prior to the game; All times are in Eastern time

== Game summaries ==
=== at Louisville (FBS) ===
Eastern Kentucky Colonels (0–0) at Louisville Cardinals (FBS) (0–0) – Game summary

Quarter	1	2	3	4	Total
Colonels	0	7	0	10	17
Cardinals (FBS)	21	20	7	3	51

at L&N Federal Credit Union Stadium • Louisville, KY

- Date: August 30
- Game time: 3:00 PM EDT
- Game weather: Sunny • Temperature: 79 °F (26 °C) • Wind: SW at 7 miles per hour (11 km/h)
- Game attendance: 50,536
- Referee: Justin Elliott
- TV announcers (ACCN): Jorge Sedano (play-by-play), Rodney McLeod (analyst) and Victoria Arlen (sideline)

Game information

First quarter

- (9:48) LOU – Isaac Brown 31-yard run (Cooper Ranvier kick) (Drive: 10 plays, 85 yards, 5:07; Louisville 7–0)
- (7:49) LOU – Caullin Lacy 93-yard punt return (Cooper Ranvier kick) (Louisville 14–0)
- (0:44) LOU – Miller Moss 8-yard run (Cooper Ranvier kick) (Drive: 10 plays, 79 yards, 4:28; Louisville 21–0)

Second quarter

- (11:05) LOU – Isaac Brown 68-yard run (Cooper Ranvier kick) (Drive: 3 plays, 75 yards, 0:52; Louisville 28–0)
- (8:26) LOU – Duke Watson 30-yard pass from Miller Moss (Cooper Ranvier kick) (Drive: 1 plays, 30 yards, 0:09; Louisville 35–0)
- (2:58) LOU – Keyjuan Brown 1-yard run (Cooper Ranvier PAT failed) (Drive: 10 plays, 67 yards, 4:02; Louisville 41–0)
- (0:50) EKU – Vito Tisdale 93-yard interception return (Buzz Flabiano kick) (Louisville 41–7)

Third quarter

- (8:26) LOU – Kris Hughes 30-yard pass from Brady Allen (Nick Keller kick) (Drive: 1 plays, 30 yards, 0:09; Louisville 48–7)

Fourth quarter

- (14:18) EKU – Brady Hensley 1-yard run (Buzz Flabiano kick) (Drive: 4 plays, 16 yards, 1:32; Louisville 48–14)
- (8:23) LOU – Cooper Ranvier 23-yard field goal (Drive: 11 plays, 70 yards, 5:55; Louisville 51–14)
- (1:06) EKU – Buzz Flabiano 38-yard field goal (Drive: 13 plays, 69 yards, 7:10; Louisville 51–17)

Statistics	EKU	LOU
First downs	10	28
Plays–yards	53–150	67–542
Rushes–yards	39–74	30–229
Passing yards	76	313
Passing: comp–att–int	5–14–0	25–37–3
Turnovers	0	3
Time of possession	29:35	30:25

Team	Category	Player	Statistics
Eastern Kentucky	Passing	Myles Burkett	5/14, 76 yards
Eastern Kentucky	Rushing	Brayden Latham	10 carries, 25 yards
Eastern Kentucky	Receiving	Marcus Calwise Jr.	1 reception, 29 yards
Louisville	Passing	Miller Moss	17/25, 223 yards, TD, 2 INT
Louisville	Rushing	Isaac Brown	6 carries, 126 yards, 2 TD
Louisville	Receiving	Chris Bell	5 receptions, 63 yards

=== Houston Christian ===
Houston Christian Huskies (1–0) at Eastern Kentucky Colonels (0–1) – Game summary

Quarter	1	2	3	4	Total
Huskies	3	7	0	0	10
Colonels	13	0	0	7	20

at Roy Kidd Stadium • Richmond, KY

- Date: September 6
- Game time: 6:00 p.m. EDT
- Game weather: Cloudy • Temperature: 56 °F (13 °C)
- Game attendance: 5,193
- Referee: Gabriel Tomlin
- TV announcers (ESPN+): Greg Stotelmyer (play-by-play) and Jim Tirey (analyst)

Game information

First Quarter

- (11:19) EKU – Buzz Flabiano 30-yard field goal (Drive: 5 plays, 8 yards, 2:46; Eastern Kentucky 3–0)
- (4:15) HCU – Charlie Weinrich 23-yard field goal (Drive: 17 plays, 63 yards, 6:59; Tied 3–3)
- (2:17) EKU – Derek Taylor 75-yard fumble recovery, Buzz Flabiano kick (Eastern Kentucky 10–3)
- (0:15) EKU – Buzz Flabiano 36-yard field goal (Drive: 4 plays, 6 yards, 1:56; Eastern Kentucky 13–3)

Second Quarter

- (5:43) HCU – Deuce McMillan 16-yard pass from Jake Weir, Charlie Weinrich kick (Drive: 8 plays, 52 yards, 2:56; Eastern Kentucky 13–10)

Third Quarter

No scoring plays

Fourth Quarter

- (13:46) EKU – Myles Burkett 1-yard run, Buzz Flabiano kick (Drive: 12 plays, 50 yards, 6:09; Eastern Kentucky 20–10)

Statistics	HCU	EKU
First downs	17	10
Total yards	259	173
Rushing yards	42	94
Passing yards	217	79
Passing: Comp–Att–Int	22–45–0	13–19–1
Time of possession	27:00	28:24

Team	Category	Player	Statistics
Houston Christian	Passing	Jake Weir	22/45, 217 yards, TD
Houston Christian	Rushing	Darryle Evans	15 carries, 40 yards
Houston Christian	Receiving	Tamarcus Gray Jr.	10 receptions, 80 yards
Eastern Kentucky	Passing	Myles Burkett	13/19, 79 yards, INT
Eastern Kentucky	Rushing	Brayden Latham	21 carries, 53 yards
Eastern Kentucky	Receiving	Dequan Stanley	5 receptions, 34 yards

=== at Marshall (FBS) ===
Eastern Kentucky Colonels (1–1) at Marshall Thundering Herd (FBS) (0–2) – Game summary

Quarter	1	2	3	4	Total
Colonels	0	0	7	0	7
Thundering Herd (FBS)	17	14	7	0	38

at Joan C. Edwards Stadium • Huntington, WV

- Date: September 13
- Game time: 6:00 PM EDT
- Game weather: Sunny
- Game attendance: 23,925
- Referee: Marshall Lewis
- TV announcers (ESPN+): Keith Morehouse (play-by-play), Mark Martin (analyst) and Ben Westfall (sideline)

Game information

First quarter

- (8:13) MRSH – Lorcan Quinn 19-yard field goal (Drive: 5 plays, 17 yards, 2:21; Marshall 3–0)
- (5:01) MRSH – Carlos Del Rio-Wilson 4-yard run, Lorcan Quinn kick (Drive: 3 plays, 21 yards, 1:05; Marshall 10–0)
- (0:25) MRSH – Justin Williams-Thomas 3-yard run, Lorcan Quinn kick (Drive: 7 plays, 56 yards, 3:15; Marshall 17–0)

Second quarter

- (12:03) MRSH – Justin Williams-Thomas 30-yard pass from Carlos Del Rio-Wilson, Lorcan Quinn kick (Drive: 3 plays, 35 yards, 1:30; Marshall 24–0)
- (0:08) MRSH – Adrian Norton 30-yard pass from Carlos Del Rio-Wilson, Lorcan Quinn kick (Drive: 7 plays, 53 yards, 1:49; Marshall 31–0)

Third quarter

- (13:08) EKU – Jayden West 13-yard pass from Jordyn Potts, Buzz Fabiano kick (Drive: 3 plays, 14 yards, 1:03; Marshall 31–7)
- (8:01) MRSH – JacQai Long 3-yard run, Lorcan Quinn kick (Drive: 5 plays, 63 yards, 2:06; Marshall 38–7)

Fourth quarter

- No scoring plays.

Statistics	EKU	MRSH
First downs	10	21
Plays–yards	52–102	71–377
Rushes–yards	28–11	57–263
Passing yards	91	114
Passing: Comp–Att–Int	8–24–2	8–14–0
Turnovers	2	2
Time of possession	25:56	34:04

Team	Category	Player	Statistics
Eastern Kentucky	Passing	Jordyn Potts	7/19, 78 yards, TD
Eastern Kentucky	Rushing	Brayden Latham	10 carries, 18 yards
Eastern Kentucky	Receiving	T. J. Mitchell	1 reception, 36 yards
Marshall	Passing	Carlos Del Rio-Wilson	7/9, 108 yards, 2 TD
Marshall	Rushing	Carlos Del Rio-Wilson	13 carries, 58 yards, TD
Marshall	Receiving	Justin Williams-Thomas	3 receptions, 41 yards, TD

=== at No. 22 West Georgia ===
Eastern Kentucky Colonels (1–2) vs. No. 22 West Georgia Wolves (3–0) – Game summary

Quarter	1	2	3	4	Total
Colonels	3	9	0	0	12
No. 22 Wolves	7	14	7	5	33

at University Stadium • Carrollton, GA

- Date: September 20
- Game time: 6:00 PM EDT
- Game weather: Sunny
- Game attendance: 4,378
- Referee: Chris Brinson
- TV announcers (ESPN+): Greg Stotelmyer (play-by-play), Wes Chandler and Jim Tirey (analysts)

Statistics	EKU	UWG
First downs	21	17
Total yards	357	242
Rushing yards	154	147
Passing yards	203	95
Passing: Comp–Att–Int	21-41-1	8-16-0
Time of possession	31:54	28:06

Team	Category	Player	Statistics
Eastern Kentucky	Passing	Myles Burkett	21/41, 203 yards, INT
Eastern Kentucky	Rushing	Brayden Latham	12 carries, 97 yards, TD
Eastern Kentucky	Receiving	Marcus Calwise Jr.	4 receptions, 67 yards
West Georgia	Passing	Davin Wydner	8/14, 95 yards, 2 TD
West Georgia	Rushing	TJ Lester	18 carries, 108 yards, TD
West Georgia	Receiving	Jordan Dees	5 receptions, 84 yards, 2 TD

=== Nicholls ===
Nicholls Colonels (1–3) vs. Eastern Kentucky Colonels (1–3) – Game summary

Quarter	1	2	3	4	Total
Nicholls	7	0	0	0	7
Eastern Kentucky	0	7	10	10	27

at Roy Kidd Stadium • Richmond, KY

- Date: September 27
- Game time: 6:00 p.m. EDT
- Game weather: Sunny
- Game attendance: 8,239
- Referee: Drew Myers
- TV announcers (ESPN+): Greg Stotelmyer (play-by-play), Jim Tirey (analyst) and Maggie Davis (sideline)

Statistics	NICH	EKU
First downs	16	14
Total yards	330	314
Rushing yards	117	242
Passing yards	213	72
Passing: Comp–Att–Int	20-31-2	7-21-0
Time of possession	31:47	28:13

Team	Category	Player	Statistics
Nicholls	Passing	Deuce Hogan	20/31, 213 yards, TD, 2 INT
Nicholls	Rushing	Shane Lee	12 carries, 65 yards
Nicholls	Receiving	Miequle Brock Jr.	3 receptions, 67 yards, TD
Eastern Kentucky	Passing	Myles Burkett	7/21, 72 yards, TD
Eastern Kentucky	Rushing	Brady Hensley	14 carries, 148 yards, TD
Eastern Kentucky	Receiving	Dequan Stanley	3 receptions, 32 yards, TD

=== No. 16 Austin Peay ===
No. 16 Austin Peay Governors (4–2) vs. Eastern Kentucky Colonels (2–3) – Game summary

Quarter	1	2	3	4	Total
No. 16 Governors	7	13	0	0	20
Colonels	7	10	3	14	34

at Roy Kidd Stadium • Richmond, KY

- Date: October 11
- Game time: 5:00 p.m. EDT
- Game weather: Sunny • Temperature: 71 °F (22 °C) • Wind: N at 7 miles per hour (11 km/h)
- Game attendance: 5,753
- Referee: Matthew Jones
- TV announcers (ESPN+): Greg Stotelmyer (play-by-play), Jim Tirey (analyst) and Kendra Sheehan (sideline)

Statistics	APSU	EKU
First downs	23	16
Total yards	473	338
Rushing yards	190	163
Passing yards	283	175
Passing: Comp–Att–Int	22-38-1	18-24-0
Time of possession	31:47	28:13

Team	Category	Player	Statistics
Austin Peay	Passing	Chris Parson	22/37, 283 yards, TD, INT
Austin Peay	Rushing	Chris Parson	21 carries, 76 yards, TD
Austin Peay	Receiving	Jaden Robinson	8 receptions, 145 yards
Eastern Kentucky	Passing	Myles Burkett	18/24, 175 yards
Eastern Kentucky	Rushing	Brady Hensley	8 carries, 90 yards, TD
Eastern Kentucky	Receiving	Dequan Stanley	4 receptions, 59 yards

=== at North Alabama ===
Eastern Kentucky Colonels (3–3) vs. North Alabama Lions (1–5) – Game summary

Quarter	1	2	3	4	Total
Colonels	0	7	0	7	14
Lions	7	7	14	7	35

at Braly Municipal Stadium • Florence, AL

- Date: October 18
- Game time: 7:00 p.m. EDT
- Game weather: Sunny
- Game attendance: 8,922
- Referee: John Kellermeier
- TV: ESPN+

Statistics	EKU	UNA
First downs	17	25
Total yards	296	412
Rushing yards	134	285
Passing yards	162	127
Passing: Comp–Att–Int	17-32-1	11-18-0
Time of possession	24:41	35:19

Team	Category	Player	Statistics
Eastern Kentucky	Passing	Myles Burkett	14/26, 133 yards, TD, INT
Eastern Kentucky	Rushing	Brayden Latham	10 carries, 76 yards
Eastern Kentucky	Receiving	Marcus Calwise Jr.	4 receptions, 63 yards, TD
North Alabama	Passing	Destin Wade	11/18, 127 yards, 2 TD
North Alabama	Rushing	Destin Wade	21 carries, 109 yards
North Alabama	Receiving	Justin Pegues	3 receptions, 37 yards

=== No. 3 Tarleton State ===
No. 3 Tarleton State Texans (8–0) vs. Eastern Kentucky Colonels (3–4) – Game summary

Quarter	1	2	3	4	Total
No. 3 Texans	7	3	21	0	31
Colonels	0	7	0	0	7

at Roy Kidd Stadium • Richmond, KY

- Date: October 25
- Game time: 3:00 p.m. EDT
- Game weather: Cloudy
- Game attendance: 6,448
- Referee: Mike Lenie
- TV: ESPN+

Statistics	TAR	EKU
First downs	24	11
Total yards	413	189
Rushing yards	178	76
Passing yards	235	113
Passing: Comp–Att–Int	19-29-0	11-19-2
Time of possession	37:55	22:05

Team	Category	Player	Statistics
Tarleton State	Passing	Victor Gabalis	18/27, 207 yards, TD
Tarleton State	Rushing	Tre Page III	13 carries, 74 yards
Tarleton State	Receiving	Cody Jackson	6 receptions, 94 yards
Eastern Kentucky	Passing	Myles Burkett	11/19, 113 yards, 2 INT
Eastern Kentucky	Rushing	Myles Burkett	11 carries, 50 yards
Eastern Kentucky	Receiving	Dequan Stanley	1 reception, 25 yards

=== at Central Arkansas ===
Eastern Kentucky Colonels (3–5) vs. Central Arkansas Bears (3–5) – Game summary

Quarter	1	2	3	4	Total
Colonels	7	14	10	3	34
Bears	10	3	0	0	13

at Estes Stadium • Conway, AR

- Date: November 1
- Game time: 5:00 p.m. EDT
- Game weather: Sunny
- Game attendance: 5,953
- Referee: Drew Myers
- TV announcers (ESPN+): Dylan McLemore (play-by-play) and Wess Moore (analyst)

Statistics	EKU	CARK
First downs	25	15
Total yards	418	280
Rushing yards	209	123
Passing yards	209	157
Passing: Comp–Att–Int	18-27-1	11-27-3
Time of possession	33:32	26:28

Team	Category	Player	Statistics
Eastern Kentucky	Passing	Myles Burkett	18/27, 209 yards, 3 TD, INT
Eastern Kentucky	Rushing	Brady Hensley	18 carries, 79 yards
Eastern Kentucky	Receiving	Marcus Calwise Jr.	6 receptions, 106 yards, 3 TD
Central Arkansas	Passing	Austin Myers	11/26, 157 yards, 2 INT
Central Arkansas	Rushing	Landen Chambers	25 carries, 116 yards, TD
Central Arkansas	Receiving	Tyrell Pollard	3 receptions, 76 yards

=== Southern Utah ===
Southern Utah Thunderbirds (4–5) vs. Eastern Kentucky Colonels (4–5) – Game summary

Quarter	1	2	3	4	Total
Thunderbirds	3	14	3	7	27
Colonels	3	14	0	0	17

at Roy Kidd Stadium • Richmond, KY

- Date: November 8
- Game time: 3:00 p.m. EDT
- Game weather: Cloudy
- Game attendance: 4,093
- Referee: John Kellermeier
- TV: ESPN+

Statistics	SUU	EKU
First downs	25	13
Total yards	495	254
Rushing yards	239	139
Passing yards	256	115
Passing: Comp–Att–Int	18-25-0	9-16-1
Time of possession	38:09	21:51

Team	Category	Player	Statistics
Southern Utah	Passing	Bronson Barron	18/25, 256 yards
Southern Utah	Rushing	Joshua Dye	33 carries, 221 yards, 3 TD
Southern Utah	Receiving	Shane Carr	7 receptions, 124 yards
Eastern Kentucky	Passing	Myles Burkett	9/16, 115 yards, TD, INT
Eastern Kentucky	Rushing	Brayden Latham	8 carries, 53 yards
Eastern Kentucky	Receiving	Jayden West	2 receptions, 34 yards

=== No. 18 Abilene Christian ===
No. 18 Abilene Christian Wildcats (6–4) vs. Eastern Kentucky Colonels (4–6) – Game summary

Quarter	1	2	3	4	Total
No. 18 Wildcats	3	0	3	11	17
Colonels	0	3	0	7	10

at Roy Kidd Stadium • Richmond, KY

- Date: November 15
- Game time: 3:00 p.m. EDT
- Game weather: Cloudy
- Game attendance: 4,067
- Referee: Zachary Erdmann
- TV: ESPN+

Statistics	ACU	EKU
First downs	24	8
Total yards	350	165
Rushing yards	124	10
Passing yards	226	155
Passing: Comp–Att–Int	23-41-0	10-24-0
Time of possession	35:19	22:12

Team	Category	Player	Statistics
Abilene Christian	Passing	Stone Earle	23/41, 226 yards, TD
Abilene Christian	Rushing	Jordon Vaughn	12 carries, 46 yards
Abilene Christian	Receiving	Javon Gipson	6 receptions, 100 yards, TD
Eastern Kentucky	Passing	Myles Burkett	10/24, 155 yards
Eastern Kentucky	Rushing	Brayden Latham	10 carries, 17 yards, TD
Eastern Kentucky	Receiving	Jackson House	1 reception, 55 yards

=== at Utah Tech ===
Eastern Kentucky Colonels (0–0) vs. Utah Tech Trailblazers (0–0) – Game summary

Quarter	1	2	3	4	Total
Colonels	7	7	7	12	33
Trailblazers	7	3	0	0	10

at Greater Zion Stadium • St. George, UT

- Date: November 22
- Game time: 4:00 p.m. EDT
- Game weather: Cloudy
- Game attendance: 2,757
- Referee: Matthew Jones
- TV: ESPN+

Statistics	EKU	UTU
First downs	20	11
Total yards	394	197
Rushing yards	264	55
Passing yards	130	142
Passing: Comp–Att–Int	12-19-0	19-35-1
Time of possession	37:02	22:58

Team	Category	Player	Statistics
Eastern Kentucky	Passing	Myles Burkett	12/19, 130 yards, 2 TD
Eastern Kentucky	Rushing	Brayden Latham	23 carries, 113 yards
Eastern Kentucky	Receiving	Marcus Calwise Jr.	4 receptions, 42 yards
Utah Tech	Passing	Bronson Barben	18/29, 130 yards, TD, INT
Utah Tech	Rushing	Chris Street	11 carries, 51 yards
Utah Tech	Receiving	Tru Tanner	1 reception, 45 yards
