= 2025 West Georgia Wolves football team =

American college football season

2025 West Georgia Wolves football
- Conference: United Athletic Conference

Ranking
- FCS Coaches: No. 22
- Record: 8–3 (5–3 UAC)
- Head coach: Joel Taylor (2nd season)
- Offensive coordinator: Austin Davis (1st season)
- Defensive coordinator: Woody Blevins (1st season)
- Home stadium: University Stadium

2025 United Athletic Conference standings
	Conf.			Overall
Team	W		L	W		L
No. 12 Abilene Christian +^	7	–	1	9	–	5
No. 6 Tarleton State +^	7	–	1	12	–	2
Southern Utah	6	–	2	7	–	5
West Georgia*	5	–	3	8	–	3
Austin Peay	4	–	4	7	–	5
Eastern Kentucky	3	–	5	5	–	7
Central Arkansas	2	–	6	3	–	9
Utah Tech	1	–	7	2	–	10
North Alabama	1	–	7	2	–	10
+ – Conference co-champions; ^ – FCS playoff participant; * – Ineligible for the UAC title and FCS postseason play due to transition from NCAA Division II.; Rankings from STATS Poll

The 2025 West Georgia Wolves football team represented the University of West Georgia as a member of the United Athletic Conference (UAC) during the 2025 NCAA Division I FCS football season. The Wolves were led by second-year head coach Joel Taylor and played at the University Stadium in Carrollton, Georgia.

== Offseason ==
=== Transfers ===
==== Outgoing ====
Player	Position	Destination

==== Incoming ====
Player	Position	Previous school
Dorian Gibson	CB	Georgia State
Cam Marshall	S	Georgia State
Ty Brewer	TE	Kennesaw State
Leslie Black	DL	Nebraska
Daniel Meunier	LS	Texas State

== Schedule ==
Date	Time	Opponent	Rank	Site	TV	Result	Attendance
August 28	7:30 p.m.	at Samford*		Pete Hanna Stadium; Homewood, AL	ESPN+	W 34–3	506
September 6	7:00 p.m.	at No. 22 Nicholls*		Manning Field at John L. Guidry Stadium; Thibodaux, LA	ESPN+	W 34–10	5,456
September 13	6:00 p.m.	East Tennessee State*	No. 25	University Stadium; Carrollton, GA	ESPN+	W 35–31	4,786
September 20	6:00 p.m.	Eastern Kentucky	No. 22	University Stadium; Carrollton, GA	ESPN+	W 33–12	4,378
September 27	8:30 p.m.	at Southern Utah	No. 18	Eccles Coliseum; Cedar City, UT	ESPN+	W 27–24	5,769
October 4	4:00 p.m.	at No. 22 Austin Peay	No. 16	Fortera Stadium; Clarksville, TN	ESPN+	L 30–44	6,582
October 11	2:00 p.m.	No. 19 Abilene Christian	No. 21	University Stadium; Carrollton, GA	ESPN+	L 13–30	4,735
October 18	7:00 p.m.	at No. 3 Tarleton State		Memorial Stadium; Stephenville, TX	ESPN+	L 10–45	24,012
October 25	2:00 p.m.	Central Arkansas^{†}		University Stadium; Carrollton, GA	ESPN+	W 18–17	5,349
November 8	4:00 p.m.	at North Alabama		Braly Municipal Stadium; Florence, AL	ESPN+	W 24–17	7,012
November 15	2:00 p.m.	Utah Tech		University Stadium; Carrollton, GA	ESPN+	W 23–0	4,554
*Non-conference game; ^{†}Homecoming; Rankings from STATS Poll released prior to the game; All times are in Eastern time

== Game summaries ==
=== at Samford ===
West Georgia Wolves (0-0) at Samford Bulldogs (0-0) – Game summary

Quarter	1	2	3	4	Total
Wolves	10	0	7	17	34
Bulldogs	0	0	0	3	3

at Pete Hanna Stadium • Homewood, AL

- Date: August 28
- Game time: 7:30 p.m. EDT
- Game weather: Sunny • Temperature: 76 °F (24 °C)
- Game attendance: 506
- Referee: Bruce Austin
- TV announcers (ESPN+): Pete Yannity (play-by-play), Jay Songhalter (analyst) and Dave Friedman (sideline)

Game information

First quarter

- UWG – Tommy Holden 23-yard field goal, 9:00. Wolves 3–0. Drive: 4 plays, 4 yards, 2:04.
- UWG – Davin Wydner 1-yard run (Tommy Holden kick), 3:04. Wolves 10–0. Drive: 11 plays, 70 yards, 5:14.

Second quarter

No scoring plays.

Third quarter

- UWG – DeAndre Buchannon 92-yard kickoff return (Tommy Holden kick), 14:47. Wolves 17–0.

Fourth quarter

- UWG – TJ Lester 3-yard run (Tommy Holden kick), 13:43. Wolves 24–0. Drive: 3 plays, 69 yards, 1:05.
- UWG – Tommy Holden 49-yard field goal, 7:06. Wolves 27–0. Drive: 11 plays, 42 yards, 4:03.
- SAM – Ty Ippolito 36-yard field goal, 4:15. Wolves 27–3. Drive: 12 plays, 57 yards, 2:51.
- UWG – Geoffrey Speight 50-yard fumble return (Tommy Holden kick), 1:46. Wolves 34–3.

Statistics	UWG	SAM
First downs	18	16
Total yards	411	271
Rushing yards	180	24
Passing yards	231	247
Passing: Comp–Att–Int	19–35–2	32–44–0
Time of possession	32:11	27:49

Team	Category	Player	Statistics
West Georgia	Passing	Davin Wydner	18/34, 209 yards, 2 INT
West Georgia	Rushing	Latrelle Murrell	11 carries, 129 yards
West Georgia	Receiving	Owen Dupree	7 receptions, 71 yards
Samford	Passing	Quincy Crittendon	22/29, 154 yards
Samford	Rushing	C.J. Evans	7 carries, 23 yards
Samford	Receiving	Preston Bird	11 receptions, 95 yards

=== at No. 22 Nicholls ===
West Georgia Wolves (1-0) at No. 22 Nicholls Colonels (1-1) – Game summary

Quarter	1	2	3	4	Total
Wolves	7	7	10	10	34
No. 22 Colonels	0	3	0	7	10

at Manning Field at John L. Guidry Stadium • Thibodaux, LA

- Date: September 6
- Game time: 7:00 p.m. EDT
- TV announcers (ESPN+): Jeff Palermo (play-by-play) and Wayde Keiser (analyst)

Statistics	UWG	NICH
First downs		
Total yards		
Rushing yards		
Passing yards		
Passing: Comp–Att–Int		
Time of possession		

Team	Category	Player	Statistics
West Georgia	Passing		
West Georgia	Rushing		
West Georgia	Receiving		
Nicholls	Passing		
Nicholls	Rushing		
Nicholls	Receiving		

=== East Tennessee State ===
East Tennessee State Buccaneers (1-1) vs. No. 25 West Georgia Wolves (2-0) – Game summary

Quarter	1	2	3	4	Total
Buccaneers	14	7	10	0	31
No. 25 Wolves	3	10	7	15	35

at University Stadium • Carrollton, GA

- Date: September 13
- Game time: 6:00 PM EDT
- Game weather: Sunny • Temperature: 79 °F (26 °C) • Wind: E at 3 miles per hour (4.8 km/h)
- Game attendance: 4,786
- Referee: Michael Lennie
- TV announcers (ESPN+): Patrick Eidson (play-by-play) and Parker Gore (analyst)

Game information

First Quarter

- (7:28) UWG – Tommy Holden 30 yard field goal (Drive: 8 plays, 21 yards, 3:16; Wolves 3–0)
- (1:43) ETSU – Jason Albritton 8 yard run, Ewan Johnson kick (Drive: 16 plays, 75 yards, 5:45; Buccaneers 7–3)
- (0:22) ETSU – Cole Keller 16 yard pass from Jacolby Criswell, Ewan Johnson kick (Drive: 3 plays, 13 yards, 0:58; Buccaneers 14–3)

Second Quarter

- (13:28) UWG – Latrelle Murrell 62 yard pass from Davin Wydner, Tommy Holden kick (Drive: 5 plays, 75 yards, 1:54; Buccaneers 14–10)
- (0:22) ETSU – Karim Page 31 yard pass from Jacolby Criswell, Ewan Johnson kick (Drive: 6 plays, 75 yards, 2:18; Buccaneers 21–10)
- (4:39) UWG – Tommy Holden 49 yard field goal (Drive: 12 plays, 51 yards, 6:18; Buccaneers 21–13)

Third Quarter

- (9:26) ETSU – Devontae Houston 11 yard pass from Jacolby Criswell, Ewan Johnson kick (Drive: 2 plays, 21 yards, 0:30; Buccaneers 28–13)
- (6:31) UWG – TJ Lester 8 yard run, Tommy Holden kick (Drive: 5 plays, 75 yards, 2:49; Buccaneers 28–20)
- (4:07) ETSU – Ewan Johnson 46 yard field goal (Drive: 7 plays, 46 yards, 2:24; Buccaneers 31–20)

Fourth Quarter

- (6:40) UWG – Latrelle Murrell 27 yard pass from Davin Wydner (DeAndre Buchanon pass) (Drive: 10 plays, 88 yards, 4:06; Buccaneers 31–28)
- (0:15) UWG – Devion Newson 2 yard pass from Davin Wydner, Tommy Holden kick (Drive: 5 plays, 71 yards, 0:27; Wolves 35–31)

Statistics	ETSU	UWG
First downs	18	27
Total yards	289	457
Rushing yards	105	194
Passing yards	184	263
Passing: Comp–Att–Int	14–22–2	18–35–3
Time of possession	23:14	36:46

Team	Category	Player	Statistics
East Tennessee State	Passing	Jacolby Criswell	5/8, 108 yards, 3 TD
East Tennessee State	Rushing	Devontae Houston	14 carries, 59 yards
East Tennessee State	Receiving	Ephraim Floyd	5 receptions, 76 yards
West Georgia	Passing	Davin Wydner	18/34, 263 yards, 3 TD, 3 INT
West Georgia	Rushing	Latrelle Murrell	20 carries, 116 yards
West Georgia	Receiving	Latrelle Murrell	3 receptions, 92 yards, 2 TD

=== Eastern Kentucky ===
Eastern Kentucky Colonels (1-2) vs. No. 22 West Georgia Wolves (3-0) – Game summary

Quarter	1	2	3	4	Total
Colonels	3	9	0	0	12
No. 22 Wolves	7	14	7	5	33

at University Stadium • Carrollton, GA

- Date: September 20
- Game time: 6:00 PM EDT
- TV announcers (ESPN+): Greg Stotelmyer (play-by-play), Wes Chandler and Jim Tirey (analysts)

Statistics	EKU	UWG
First downs		
Total yards		
Rushing yards		
Passing yards		
Passing: Comp–Att–Int		
Time of possession		

Team	Category	Player	Statistics
Eastern Kentucky	Passing		
Eastern Kentucky	Rushing		
Eastern Kentucky	Receiving		
West Georgia	Passing		
West Georgia	Rushing		
West Georgia	Receiving		

=== at Southern Utah ===
No. 18 West Georgia Wolves (4-0) vs. Southern Utah Thunderbirds (1-3) – Game summary

Quarter	1	2	3	4	Total
No. 18 Wolves	3	14	7	3	27
Thunderbirds	3	0	14	7	24

at Eccles Coliseum • Cedar City, UT

- Date: September 27
- Game time: 8:30 p.m. EDT
- TV announcers (ESPN+): Spencer McLaughlin (play-by-play) and Dallin Richards (analyst)

Statistics	UWG	SUU
First downs		
Total yards		
Rushing yards		
Passing yards		
Passing: Comp–Att–Int		
Time of possession		

Team	Category	Player	Statistics
West Georgia	Passing		
West Georgia	Rushing		
West Georgia	Receiving		
Southern Utah	Passing		
Southern Utah	Rushing		
Southern Utah	Receiving		

=== at No. 22 Austin Peay ===
No. 16 West Georgia Wolves (5-0) vs. No. 22 Austin Peay Governors (3-2) – Game summary

Quarter	1	2	3	4	Total
No. 16 Wolves	16	0	14	0	30
No. 22 Governors	9	7	14	14	44

at Fortera Stadium • Clarksville, TN

- Date: October 4
- Game time: 4:00 p.m. EDT
- TV announcers (ESPN+): Barry Gresham (play-by-play) and Ethan Schmidt (analyst)

Statistics	UWG	APSU
First downs		
Total yards		
Rushing yards		
Passing yards		
Passing: Comp–Att–Int		
Time of possession		

Team	Category	Player	Statistics
West Georgia	Passing		
West Georgia	Rushing		
West Georgia	Receiving		
Austin Peay	Passing		
Austin Peay	Rushing		
Austin Peay	Receiving		

=== No. 19 Abilene Christian ===
No. 19 Abilene Christian Wildcats (3-3) vs. No. 21 West Georgia Wolves (5-1) – Game summary

Quarter	1	2	3	4	Total
No. 19 Wildcats	3	14	7	6	30
No. 21 Wolves	3	3	7	0	13

at University Stadium • Carrollton, GA

- Date: October 11
- Game time: 2:00 PM EDT
- TV announcers (ESPN+): Patrick Eidson (play-by-play) and Parker Glore (analyst)

Statistics	ACU	UWG
First downs		
Total yards		
Rushing yards		
Passing yards		
Passing: Comp–Att–Int		
Time of possession		

Team	Category	Player	Statistics
Abilene Christian	Passing		
Abilene Christian	Rushing		
Abilene Christian	Receiving		
West Georgia	Passing		
West Georgia	Rushing		
West Georgia	Receiving		

=== at No. 3 Tarleton State ===
West Georgia Wolves (5-2) vs. No. 3 Tarleton State Texans (7-0) – Game summary

Quarter	1	2	3	4	Total
Wolves	0	0	3	7	10
No. 3 Texans	7	17	7	14	45

at Memorial Stadium • Stephenville, TX

- Date: October 18

Statistics	UWG	TAR
First downs		
Total yards		
Rushing yards		
Passing yards		
Passing: Comp–Att–Int		
Time of possession		

Team	Category	Player	Statistics
West Georgia	Passing		
West Georgia	Rushing		
West Georgia	Receiving		
Tarleton State	Passing		
Tarleton State	Rushing		
Tarleton State	Receiving		

=== Central Arkansas ===
Central Arkansas Bears (3-4) vs. West Georgia Wolves (5-3) – Game summary

Quarter	1	2	3	4	Total
Bears	0	14	3	0	17
Wolves	0	3	3	12	18

at University Stadium • Carrollton, GA

- Date: October 25
- Game time: 2:00 PM EDT

Statistics	CARK	UWG
First downs		
Total yards		
Rushing yards		
Passing yards		
Passing: Comp–Att–Int		
Time of possession		

Team	Category	Player	Statistics
Central Arkansas	Passing		
Central Arkansas	Rushing		
Central Arkansas	Receiving		
West Georgia	Passing		
West Georgia	Rushing		
West Georgia	Receiving		

=== at North Alabama ===
West Georgia Wolves (6-3) vs. North Alabama Lions (2-7) – Game summary

Quarter	1	2	3	4	Total
Wolves	-	-	-	-	0
Lions	-	-	-	-	0

at Braly Municipal Stadium • Florence, AL

- Date: November 8

Statistics	UWG	UNA
First downs		
Total yards		
Rushing yards		
Passing yards		
Passing: Comp–Att–Int		
Time of possession		

Team	Category	Player	Statistics
West Georgia	Passing		
West Georgia	Rushing		
West Georgia	Receiving		
North Alabama	Passing		
North Alabama	Rushing		
North Alabama	Receiving		

=== Utah Tech ===
Utah Tech Trailblazers (0-0) vs. West Georgia Wolves (0-0) – Game summary

Quarter	1	2	3	4	Total
Trailblazers	-	-	-	-	0
Wolves	-	-	-	-	0

at University Stadium • Carrollton, GA

- Date: November 15
- Game time: 4:00 PM EST

Statistics	UTU	UWG
First downs		
Total yards		
Rushing yards		
Passing yards		
Passing: Comp–Att–Int		
Time of possession		

Team	Category	Player	Statistics
Utah Tech	Passing		
Utah Tech	Rushing		
Utah Tech	Receiving		
West Georgia	Passing		
West Georgia	Rushing		
West Georgia	Receiving		
