= 2025 Utah Tech Trailblazers football team =

American college football season

2025 Utah Tech Trailblazers football
- Conference: United Athletic Conference
- Record: 2–10 (1–7 UAC)
- Head coach: Lance Anderson (2nd season)
- Offensive coordinator: Greg Stevens (2nd season)
- Defensive coordinator: Patrick Moynahan (2nd season)
- Home stadium: Greater Zion Stadium

2025 United Athletic Conference standings
	Conf.			Overall
Team	W		L	W		L
No. 12 Abilene Christian +^	7	–	1	9	–	5
No. 6 Tarleton State +^	7	–	1	12	–	2
Southern Utah	6	–	2	7	–	5
West Georgia*	5	–	3	8	–	3
Austin Peay	4	–	4	7	–	5
Eastern Kentucky	3	–	5	5	–	7
Central Arkansas	2	–	6	3	–	9
Utah Tech	1	–	7	2	–	10
North Alabama	1	–	7	2	–	10
+ – Conference co-champions; ^ – FCS playoff participant; * – Ineligible for the UAC title and FCS postseason play due to transition from NCAA Division II.; Rankings from STATS Poll

The 2025 Utah Tech Trailblazers football team represented Utah Tech University as a member of the United Athletic Conference (UAC) during the 2025 NCAA Division I FCS football season. The Trailblazers were led by second-year head coach Lance Anderson and played their home games at Greater Zion Stadium in St. George, Utah.

== Schedule ==
Date	Time	Opponent	Site	TV	Result	Attendance
August 30	8:00 p.m.	No. 8 UC Davis*	Greater Zion Stadium; St. George, UT	ESPN+	L 24–31	4,629
September 6	3:00 p.m.	at No. 19 Northern Arizona*	Walkup Skydome; Flagstaff, AZ	ESPN+	L 31–38	9,611
September 13	2:00 p.m.	at No. 8 Idaho*	Kibbie Dome; Moscow, ID	ESPN+	L 6–20	7,681
September 20	6:00 p.m.	Northern Iowa*	Greater Zion Stadium; St. George, UT	ESPN+	W 20–9	4,784
September 27	12:00 p.m.	at No. 23 Austin Peay	Fortera Stadium; Clarksville, TN	ESPN+	L 10–42	6,433
October 4	3:00 p.m.	at Central Arkansas	Estes Stadium; Conway, AR	ESPN+	L 17–23	3,871
October 11	6:00 p.m.	No. 3 Tarleton State	Greater Zion Stadium; St. George, UT	ESPN+	L 23–41	3,818
October 25	6:00 p.m.	Southern Utah^{†}	Greater Zion Stadium; St. George, UT	ESPN+	L 7–28	6,814
November 1	2:00 p.m.	North Alabama	Greater Zion Stadium; St. George, UT	ESPN+	W 34–33 ^{OT}	2,770
November 8	1:00 p.m.	at No. 18 Abilene Christian	Wildcat Stadium; Abilene, TX	ESPN+	L 10–31	7,833
November 15	12:00 p.m.	at West Georgia	University Stadium; Carrollton, GA	ESPN+	L 0–23	4,554
November 22	2:00 p.m.	Eastern Kentucky	Greater Zion Stadium; St. George, UT	ESPN+	L 33–10	2,757
*Non-conference game; ^{†}Homecoming; Rankings from STATS Poll released prior to the game; All times are in Mountain time

== Game summaries ==
=== No. 8 UC Davis ===
No. 8 UC Davis Aggies (0–0) at Utah Tech Trailblazers (0–0) – Game summary

Quarter	1	2	3	4	Total
No. 8 Aggies	7	0	14	10	31
Trailblazers	3	7	14	0	24

at Greater Zion Stadium • St. George, UT

- Date: August 30
- Game time: 7:00 pm
- Game attendance: 4,629
- Referee: Jeremee Tate
- TV: ESPN+

Game information

First quarter

- UTU – Ilya Uvaydov 33-yard field goal, 9:06. Trailblazers 3–0. Drive: 6 plays, 15 yards, 2:53.
- UCD – Jordan Fisher 66-yard run (Hunter Ridley kick), 8:32. Aggies 7–3. Drive: 2 plays, 75 yards, 0:34.

Second quarter

- UTU – Eric Olsen 1-yard pass from Reggie Graf (Ilya Uvaydov kick), 0:31. Trailblazers 10–7. Drive: 13 plays, 47 yards, 5:36.

Third quarter

- UTU – Tru Tanner 45-yard pass from Reggie Graf (Ilya Uvaydov kick), 14:06. Trailblazers 17–7. Drive: 1 play, 45 yards, 0:07.
- UTU – Chris Street 1-yard run (Ilya Uvaydov kick), 8:01. Trailblazers 24–7. Drive: 6 plays, 50 yards, 2:32.
- UCD – Zach Jones 14-yard pass from Caden Pinnick (Hunter Ridley kick), 5:04. Trailblazers 24–14. Drive: 8 plays, 75 yards, 2:57.
- UCD – Samuel Gbatu Jr. 20-yard pass from Caden Pinnick (Hunter Ridley kick), 2:02. Trailblazers 24–21. Drive: 4 plays, 51 yards, 1:11.

Fourth quarter

- UCD – Hunter Ridley 29-yard field goal, 12:42. Tied 24–24. Drive: 7 plays, 14 yards, 2:45.
- UCD – Samuel Gbatu Jr. 60-yard pass from Caden Pinnick (Hunter Ridley kick), 6:17. Aggies 31–24. Drive: 9 plays, 81 yards, 3:52.

Statistics	UCD	UTU
First downs	21	18
Plays–yards	74–425	74–360
Rushes–yards	43–164	30–81
Passing yards	253	272
Passing: Comp–Att–Int	21-31-1	28–44–2
Turnovers	2	4
Time of possession	27:45	32:15

Team	Category	Player	Statistics
UC Davis	Passing	Caden Pinnick	21/31, 253 yards, 3 TD, INT
UC Davis	Rushing	Jordan Fisher	16 carries, 105 yards, TD
UC Davis	Receiving	Samuel Gbatu Jr.	4 receptions, 93 yards, 2 TD
Utah Tech	Passing	Bronson Barben	24/39, 222 yards, 2 INT
Utah Tech	Rushing	Bronson Barben	9 carries, 28 yards
Utah Tech	Receiving	Kaden Eggett	3 receptions, 58 yards

=== at No. 19 Northern Arizona ===
Utah Tech Trailblazers (0–1) at No. 19 Northern Arizona Lumberjacks (0–1) – Game summary

Quarter	1	2	3	4	Total
Trailblazers	7	3	7	14	31
No. 19 Lumberjacks	14	17	0	7	38

at Walkup Skydome • Flagstaff, AZ

- Date: September 6
- Game time: 3:00 pm
- Game weather: none (played indoors)
- Game attendance: 9,611
- Referee: Jeff Rink
- TV announcers (ESPN+): Mitch Strohman (play-by-play), Kevin Stephens (analyst) and Adriana Sparks (sideline)

Game information

First quarter

- UTU – Daniel Thomason 9-yard pass from Bronson Barben (Ilya Uvaydov kick), 11:21. Trailblazers 7–0. Drive: 2 plays, 11 yards, 0:50.
- NAU – Seth Cromwell 2-yard run (Samuel Hunsaker kick), 5:26. Tied 7–7. Drive: 11 plays, 75 yards, 5:55.
- NAU – Ty Pennington 12-yard run (Samuel Hunsaker kick), 0:58. Lumberjacks 14–7. Drive: 4 plays, 54 yards, 2:22.

Second quarter

- NAU – Samuel Hunsaker 40-yard field goal, 9:45. Lumberjacks 17–7. Drive: 10 plays, 44 yards, 5:15.
- NAU – Seth Cromwell 3-yard run (Samuel Hunsaker kick), 7:13. Lumberjacks 24–7. Drive: 2 plays, 5 yards, 0:50.
- UTU – Ilya Uvaydov 39-yard field goal, 2:23. Lumberjacks 24–10. Drive: 10 plays, 46 yards, 4:50.
- NAU – Kolbe Katsis 49-yard pass from Ty Pennington (Samuel Hunsaker kick), 0:59. Lumberjacks 31–10. Drive: 6 plays, 75 yards, 1:24.

Third quarter

- UTU – Reggie Graff 31-yard run (Ilya Uvaydov kick), 5:54. Lumberjacks 31–17. Drive: 7 plays, 59 yards, 3:46.

Fourth quarter

- NAU – Darvon Hubbard 8-yard run (Samuel Hunsaker kick), 14:56. Lumberjacks 38–17. Drive: 8 plays, 79 yards, 3:09.
- UTU – Reggie Graff 8-yard run (Ilya Uvaydov kick), 9:02. Lumberjacks 38–24. Drive: 12 plays, 75 yards, 5:54.
- UTU – Asa Chatman 17-yard run (Ilya Uvaydov kick), 4:29. Lumberjacks 38–31. Drive: 7 plays, 53 yards, 2:27.

Statistics	UTU	NAU
First downs	20	20
Plays–yards	62–294	69–391
Rushes–yards	31–158	41–162
Passing yards	136	229
Passing: Comp–Att–Int	15–31–3	21–28–1
Turnovers	3	1
Time of possession	26:52	33:08

Team	Category	Player	Statistics
Utah Tech	Passing	Reggie Graff	12/24, 75 yards, INT
Utah Tech	Rushing	Reggie Graff	10 carries, 74 yards, 2 TD
Utah Tech	Receiving	Kaden Eggett	3 receptions, 59 yards
Northern Arizona	Passing	Ty Pennington	21/28, 229 yards, TD, INT
Northern Arizona	Rushing	Seth Cromwell	15 carries, 67 yards, 2 TD
Northern Arizona	Receiving	Kolbe Katsis	3 receptions, 82 yards, TD

=== at No. 8 Idaho ===
Utah Tech Trailblazers (0–2) at No. 8 Idaho Vandals (1–1) – Game summary

Quarter	1	2	3	4	Total
Trailblazers	0	3	3	0	6
No. 8 Vandals	0	10	3	7	20

at Kibbie Dome • Moscow, ID

- Date: September 13
- Game time: 2:00 pm MDT
- Game weather: Indoor • Temperature: 75 °F (24 °C)
- Game attendance: 7,681
- Referee: Mike Bezner
- TV announcers (ESPN+): Austin Getz (play-by-play) and Adam Shackleford (analyst)

Game information

First quarter

- No scoring plays.

Second quarter

- IDHO - Ryan Jezioro 6-yard pass from Joshua Wood (Cameron Pope kick), 13:12. Vandals 7-0. Drive: 14 plays, 70 yards, 7:40.
- IDHO - Owen Forsman 24-yard field goal, 0:17. Vandals 10-0. Drive: 12 plays, 84 yards, 2:55.
- UTU - Ilya Uvaydov 55-yard field goal, 0:00. Vandals 10-3. Drive: 3 plays, 38 yards, 0:17.

Third quarter

- UTU - Ilya Uvaydov 53-yard field goal, 9:29. Vandals 10-6. Drive: 12 plays, 49 yards, 5:26.
- IDHO - Owen Forsman 49-yard field goal, 6:04. Vandals 13-6. Drive: 8 plays, 43 yards, 3:25.

Fourth quarter

- IDHO - Joshua Wood 18-yard run (Owen Forsman kick), 6:27. Vandals 20-6. Drive: 12 plays, 94 yards, 7:12.

Statistics	UTU	IDHO
First downs	15	26
Plays–yards	54–247	71–405
Rushes–yards	25–98	46–286
Passing yards	149	119
Passing: Comp–Att–Int	17-29-1	14-25-0
Turnovers	1	0
Time of possession	25:14	34:46

Team	Category	Player	Statistics
Utah Tech	Passing	Bronson Barben	12/20, 111 yards
Utah Tech	Rushing	Reggie Graff	7 carries, 45 yards
Utah Tech	Receiving	Eric Olsen	5 receptions, 45 yards
Idaho	Passing	Joshua Wood	14/25, 119 yards, TD
Idaho	Rushing	Art Williams	16 carries, 144 yards
Idaho	Receiving	Ryan Jezioro	5 receptions, 50 yards, TD

=== Northern Iowa ===
Northern Iowa Panthers (2-1) at Utah Tech Trailblazers (0-3) – Game summary

Quarter	1	2	3	4	Total
Panthers	-	-	-	-	0
Trailblazers	-	-	-	-	0

at Greater Zion Stadium • St. George, UT

- Date: September 20
- Game time: 6:00 p.m. MDT
- TV announcers (ESPN+): Rod Zundel (play-by-play) and Max Christensen III (analyst)

Statistics	UNI	UTU
First downs		
Total yards		
Rushing yards		
Passing yards		
Passing: Comp–Att–Int		
Time of possession		

Team	Category	Player	Statistics
Northern Iowa	Passing		
Northern Iowa	Rushing		
Northern Iowa	Receiving		
Utah Tech	Passing		
Utah Tech	Rushing		
Utah Tech	Receiving		

=== at No. 23 Austin Peay ===
Utah Tech Trailblazers (1-3) vs. No. 23 Austin Peay Governors (2-2) – Game summary

Quarter	1	2	3	4	Total
Trailblazers	0	3	0	7	10
No. 23 Governors	7	21	7	7	42

at Fortera Stadium • Clarksville, TN

- Date: September 27
- Game time: 12:00 p.m. MDT
- TV announcers (ESPN+): Barry Gresham (play-by-play) and Ethan Schmidt (analyst)

Statistics	UTU	APSU
First downs		
Total yards		
Rushing yards		
Passing yards		
Passing: Comp–Att–Int		
Time of possession		

Team	Category	Player	Statistics
Utah Tech	Passing		
Utah Tech	Rushing		
Utah Tech	Receiving		
Austin Peay	Passing		
Austin Peay	Rushing		
Austin Peay	Receiving		

=== at Central Arkansas ===
Utah Tech Trailblazers (1-4) vs. Central Arkansas Bears (1-4) – Game summary

Quarter	1	2	3	4	Total
Trailblazers	0	10	7	0	17
Bears	0	10	10	3	23

at Estes Stadium • Conway, AR

- Date: October 4
- Game time: 3:00 p.m. MDT
- TV: ESPN+

Statistics	UTU	CARK
First downs		
Total yards		
Rushing yards		
Passing yards		
Passing: Comp–Att–Int		
Time of possession		

Team	Category	Player	Statistics
Utah Tech	Passing		
Utah Tech	Rushing		
Utah Tech	Receiving		
Central Arkansas	Passing		
Central Arkansas	Rushing		
Central Arkansas	Receiving		

=== No. 3 Tarleton State ===
No. 3 Tarleton State Texans (6-0) vs. Utah Tech Trailblazers (1-5) – Game summary

Quarter	1	2	3	4	Total
No. 3 Texans	13	7	7	14	41
Trailblazers	7	6	3	7	23

at Greater Zion Stadium • St. George, UT

- Date: October 11

Statistics	TAR	UTU
First downs		
Total yards		
Rushing yards		
Passing yards		
Passing: Comp–Att–Int		
Time of possession		

Team	Category	Player	Statistics
Tarleton State	Passing		
Tarleton State	Rushing		
Tarleton State	Receiving		
Utah Tech	Passing		
Utah Tech	Rushing		
Utah Tech	Receiving		

=== Southern Utah ===
Southern Utah Thunderbirds (2-5) vs. Utah Tech Trailblazers (1-5) – Game summary

Quarter	1	2	3	4	Total
Thunderbirds	-	-	-	-	0
Trailblazers	-	-	-	-	0

at Greater Zion Stadium • St. George, UT

- Date: October 25

Statistics	SUU	UTU
First downs		
Total yards		
Rushing yards		
Passing yards		
Passing: Comp–Att–Int		
Time of possession		

Team	Category	Player	Statistics
Southern Utah	Passing		
Southern Utah	Rushing		
Southern Utah	Receiving		
Utah Tech	Passing		
Utah Tech	Rushing		
Utah Tech	Receiving		

=== North Alabama ===
North Alabama Lions (2-6) vs. Utah Tech Trailblazers (1-7) – Game summary

Quarter	1	2	3	4	Total
Lions	-	-	-	-	0
Trailblazers	-	-	-	-	0

at Greater Zion Stadium • St. George, UT

- Date: November 1
- Game time: 2:00 PM MDT

Statistics	UNA	UTU
First downs		
Total yards		
Rushing yards		
Passing yards		
Passing: Comp–Att–Int		
Time of possession		

Team	Category	Player	Statistics
North Alabama	Passing		
North Alabama	Rushing		
North Alabama	Receiving		
Utah Tech	Passing		
Utah Tech	Rushing		
Utah Tech	Receiving		

=== at No. 18 Abilene Christian ===
Utah Tech Trailblazers (2-7) vs. No. 18 Abilene Christian Wildcats (5-4) – Game summary

Quarter	1	2	3	4	Total
Trailblazers	-	-	-	-	0
No. 18 Wildcats	-	-	-	-	0

at Wildcat Stadium • Abilene, TX

- Date: November 8

Statistics	UTU	ACU
First downs		
Total yards		
Rushing yards		
Passing yards		
Passing: Comp–Att–Int		
Time of possession		

Team	Category	Player	Statistics
Utah Tech	Passing		
Utah Tech	Rushing		
Utah Tech	Receiving		
Abilene Christian	Passing		
Abilene Christian	Rushing		
Abilene Christian	Receiving		

=== at West Georgia ===
Utah Tech Trailblazers (0-0) vs. West Georgia Wolves (0-0) – Game summary

Quarter	1	2	3	4	Total
Trailblazers	-	-	-	-	0
Wolves	-	-	-	-	0

at University Stadium • Carrollton, GA

- Date: November 15
- Game time: 4:00 PM EST

Statistics	UTU	UWG
First downs		
Total yards		
Rushing yards		
Passing yards		
Passing: Comp–Att–Int		
Time of possession		

Team	Category	Player	Statistics
Utah Tech	Passing		
Utah Tech	Rushing		
Utah Tech	Receiving		
West Georgia	Passing		
West Georgia	Rushing		
West Georgia	Receiving		

=== Eastern Kentucky ===
Eastern Kentucky Colonels (0-0) vs. Utah Tech Trailblazers (0-0) – Game summary

Quarter	1	2	3	4	Total
Colonels	-	-	-	-	0
Trailblazers	-	-	-	-	0

at Greater Zion Stadium • St. George, UT

- Date: November 22

Statistics	EKU	UTU
First downs		
Total yards		
Rushing yards		
Passing yards		
Passing: Comp–Att–Int		
Time of possession		

Team	Category	Player	Statistics
Eastern Kentucky	Passing		
Eastern Kentucky	Rushing		
Eastern Kentucky	Receiving		
Utah Tech	Passing		
Utah Tech	Rushing		
Utah Tech	Receiving		
