= 2025 North Alabama Lions football team =

American college football season

2025 North Alabama Lions football
- Conference: United Athletic Conference
- Record: 2–10 (1–7 UAC)
- Head coach: Brent Dearmon (3rd season)
- Offensive coordinator: Morgan Cruce (1st season)
- Defensive coordinator: Brock Caraboa (3rd season)
- Home stadium: Braly Municipal Stadium

2025 United Athletic Conference standings
| | Conf. | | | Overall |
| Team | W | | L | W | | L |
|---|---|---|---|---|---|---|
| No. 12 Abilene Christian +^ | 7 | – | 1 | 9 | – | 5 |
| No. 6 Tarleton State +^ | 7 | – | 1 | 12 | – | 2 |
| Southern Utah | 6 | – | 2 | 7 | – | 5 |
| West Georgia* | 5 | – | 3 | 8 | – | 3 |
| Austin Peay | 4 | – | 4 | 7 | – | 5 |
| Eastern Kentucky | 3 | – | 5 | 5 | – | 7 |
| Central Arkansas | 2 | – | 6 | 3 | – | 9 |
| Utah Tech | 1 | – | 7 | 2 | – | 10 |
| North Alabama | 1 | – | 7 | 2 | – | 10 |
+ – Conference co-champions; ^ – FCS playoff participant; * – Ineligible for the UAC title and FCS postseason play due to transition from NCAA Division II.; Rankings from STATS Poll

The 2025 North Alabama Lions football team represented the University of North Alabama as a member of the United Athletic Conference (UAC) during the 2025 NCAA Division I FCS football season. The Lions were led by third-year head coach Brent Dearmon and played their home games at Braly Municipal Stadium in Florence, Alabama. The season marked the final season for the Lions at Braly Municipal Stadium.

== Offseason ==
=== Transfers ===
==== Outgoing ====
The Lions lost twenty-three players to the transfer portal.

| Player | Position | New school |
|---|---|---|
| Zach Aird | K | Kentucky Wesleyan |
| Travelle Anderson | RB | Arkansas–Monticello |
| Josh Anglin | LB | Tulsa |
| Philjae Bien-Aime | DB | Robert Morris |
| Christopher Burnett | DB | Alcorn State |
| Mickel Clay | OL | West Virginia |
| Chris Cotton | LB | Albany State |
| Ethan Cunningham | RB | Tennessee State |
| Tyrik Daniels | DL | Unknown |
| Kendrick Davis | LB | Holmes CC |
| JJ Evans | WR | Norfolk State |
| Anthony Faiivae | OL | Unknown |
| Ben Harris | QB | Emporia State |
| Ryan Madison | DB | Unknown |
| Dennis Moody | RB | North Texas |
| Jayme Motley-Simmons | OL | Akron |
| Shaun Myers | LB | Colorado |
| Garrick Ponder | LB | Southern Miss |
| A.J. Seay | DB | Furman |
| TJ Smith | QB | Unknown |
| La'Charles Taylor | OL | Western Carolina |
| Edwin White Schultz | S | Keiser |
| Ashaad Williams | CB | Wake Forest |

==== Incoming ====
The Lions added thirteen players from the transfer portal.

| Player | Position | Previous school |
|---|---|---|
| Lance Bassett | DT | Kansas |
| Noah Bolticoff | OL | Indiana |
| Christian Burkhalter | TE | Georgia Tech |
| Boubacar Diakate | DL | Vanderbilt |
| Brian Dilworth | DB | Kansas |
| Drew Lawson | OL | Southern Miss |
| Davon Martin | DB | Murray State |
| Jamari Payne | EDGE | Purdue |
| Justin Pegues | WR | Bowling Green |
| Demarcious Robinson | LB | Georgia Southern |
| LT Sanders | RB | Western Kentucky |
| Ian Vachon | PK | Auburn |
| Destin Wade | QB | Colorado |

=== Recruiting class ===
College recruiting (2025)
| Name | Hometown | School | Height | Weight | Commit date |
|---|---|---|---|---|---|
Overall recruit ranking:
Note: In many cases, Scout, Rivals, 247Sports, On3, and ESPN may conflict in their listings of height and weight.; In these cases, the average was taken. ESPN grades are on a 100-point scale.; Sources: "Rivals commits". Rivals.; "2025 Team Ranking". Rivals.com.; "247Sports commits". 247Sports.

== Schedule ==
North Alabama's 2025 schedule features twelve games, five at home and seven away. The season started with the Lions' first ever meeting against Western Kentucky on August 30. The schedule also sees UNA's first matchup against Northeastern State on September 13. Other notable games include conference matchups against Utah Tech and West Georgia. On November 1, UNA will play their first ever away game against Utah Tech as both the 2023 and 2024 games were played in Florence, Alabama. The next week, on November 8, the Lions will host the West Georgia Wolves at Braly Municipal Stadium for the first time since 2016, when both were still NCAA Division II programs and members of the Gulf South Conference.

The November 22 matchup against Southern Utah is slated to be the Lions' last game at Braly Stadium before moving to Bobby Wallace Field at Bank Independent Stadium in 2026.

| Date | Time | Opponent | Site | TV | Result | Attendance |
|---|---|---|---|---|---|---|
| August 30 | 6:00 p.m. | at Western Kentucky* | Houchens Industries–L. T. Smith Stadium; Bowling Green, KY | ESPN+ | L 6–55 | 12,226 |
| September 6 | 6:00 p.m. | at Southeast Missouri State* | Houck Stadium; Cape Girardeau, MO | ESPN+ | L 21–30 | 3,890 |
| September 13 | 6:00 p.m. | Northeastern State* | Braly Municipal Stadium; Florence, AL | ESPN+ | W 49–21 | 9,739 |
| September 20 | 12:00 p.m. | at No. 6 Illinois State* | Hancock Stadium; Normal, IL | ESPN+ | L 36–38 ^{2OT} | 11,287 |
| October 4 | 2:00 p.m. | at No. 19 Abilene Christian | Wildcat Stadium; Abilene, TX | ESPN+ | L 23–52 | 7,377 |
| October 11 | 3:00 p.m. | Central Arkansas | Braly Municipal Stadium; Florence, AL | ESPN+ | L 21–49 | 9,125 |
| October 18 | 6:00 p.m. | Eastern Kentucky^{†} | Braly Municipal Stadium; Florence, AL | ESPN+ | W 35–14 | 8,922 |
| October 25 | 3:00 p.m. | at No. 25 Austin Peay | Fortera Stadium; Clarksville, TN | ESPN+ | L 28–56 | 7,773 |
| November 1 | 3:00 p.m. | at Utah Tech | Greater Zion Stadium; St. George, UT | ESPN+ | L 33–34 ^{OT} | 2,770 |
| November 8 | 3:00 p.m. | West Georgia | Braly Municipal Stadium; Florence, AL | ESPN+ | L 17–24 | 7,012 |
| November 15 | 6:00 p.m. | at No. 6 Tarleton State | Memorial Stadium; Stephenville, TX | ESPN+ | L 0–61 | 21,067 |
| November 22 | 1:00 p.m. | Southern Utah | Braly Municipal Stadium; Florence, AL | ESPN+/WAFF 48.3 | L 34–36 ^{2OT} | 7,632 |
*Non-conference game; ^{†}Homecoming; Rankings from STATS Poll released prior to the game; All times are in Central time

== Game summaries ==
=== at Western Kentucky (FBS) ===
North Alabama Lions (0-0) at Western Kentucky Hilltoppers (FBS) (1-0) – Game summary

| Quarter | 1 | 2 | 3 | 4 | Total |
|---|---|---|---|---|---|
| Lions | 6 | 0 | 0 | 0 | 6 |
| Hilltoppers (FBS) | 14 | 28 | 3 | 10 | 55 |

at Houchens Industries–L. T. Smith Stadium • Bowling Green, KY

- Date: August 30
- Game time: 6:00 PM CDT
- Game weather: Weather: Sunny • Temp: 78 °F (26 °C)
- Game attendance: 12,226
- Referee: Douglas Mercer
- TV announcers (ESPN+): Jesse Ough (play-by-play) and Terry Obee (analyst)

Game information

First Quarter

- (11:58) WKU – George Hart III 1-yard run (John Cannon kick) (Drive: 4 plays, 13 yards, 1:55; WKU 7-0)
- (5:58) UNA – Ian Vachon 25-yard field goal (Drive: 13 plays, 70 yards, 5:54; WKU 7-3)
- (5:58) UNA – Ian Vachon 47-yard field goal (Drive: 7 plays, 51 yards, 2:50; WKU 7-6)
- (11:58) WKU – Quincy Burroughs 9-yard pass from Maverick McIvor (John Cannon kick) (Drive: 5 plays, 75 yards, 2:00; WKU 14-6)

Second Quarter

- (8:24) WKU – Jairus Mack 20-yard pass from Maverick McIvor (John Cannon kick) (Drive: 8 plays, 72 yards, 3:01; WKU 21-6)
- (5:34) WKU – K.D. Hutchinson 78-yard pass from Maverick McIvor (John Cannon kick) (Drive: 1 play, 78 yards, 0:12; WKU 28-6)
- (2:25) WKU – K.D. Hutchinson 12-yard pass from Maverick McIvor (John Cannon kick) (Drive: 5 plays, 64 yards, 1:46; WKU 35-6)
- (0:48) WKU – Matthew Henry 14-yard pass from Maverick McIvor (John Cannon kick) (Drive: 5 plays, 25 yards, 0:59; WKU 42-6)

Third Quarter

- (0:48) WKU – John Cannon 46-yard field goal (Drive: 9 plays, 32 yards, 3:58; WKU 45-6)

Fourth Quarter

- (14:50) WKU – Marvin Sims 14-yard pass from Rodney Tisdale Jr (John Cannon kick) (Drive: 8 plays, 67 yards, 0:18; WKU 52-6)
- (6:30) WKU – John Cannon 43-yard field goal (Drive: 10 plays, 47 yards, 5:18; WKU 55-6)

| Statistics | UNA | WKU |
|---|---|---|
| First downs | 17 | 26 |
| Plays–yards | 74–258 | 72–563 |
| Rushes–yards | 37–153 | 33–164 |
| Passing yards | 105 | 399 |
| Passing: Comp–Att–Int | 16–37–0 | 30–39–0 |
| Turnovers | 1 | 0 |
| Time of possession | 32:21 | 27:39 |

| Team | Category | Player | Statistics |
|---|---|---|---|
| North Alabama | Passing | Ari Patu | 11/20, 86 yards |
| North Alabama | Rushing | Destin Wade | 5 carries, 34 yards |
| North Alabama | Receiving | Justin Pegues | 5 receptions, 52 yards |
| Western Kentucky | Passing | Maverick McIvor | 24/31, 305 yards, 5 TD |
| Western Kentucky | Rushing | Jaden McGill | 9 carries, 46 yards |
| Western Kentucky | Receiving | K.D. Hutchinson | 5 receptions, 113 yards, 2 TD |

=== at Southeast Missouri State ===
| Overall record | Previous meeting | Previous winner | Score |
|---|---|---|---|
| 0–1 | August 24, 2024 | Southeast Missouri State | 15–37 |

North Alabama Lions (0-1) vs. Southeast Missouri State Redhawks (0-1) – Game summary

| Quarter | 1 | 2 | 3 | 4 | Total |
|---|---|---|---|---|---|
| Lions | 7 | 0 | 0 | 14 | 21 |
| Redhawks | 0 | 13 | 10 | 7 | 30 |

at Houck Stadium • Cape Girardeau, MO

- Date: September 6
- Game time: 6:00 PM CDT
- TV announcers (ESPN+): Erik Sean (play-by-play) and Rick Wieser (analyst)

| Statistics | UNA | SEMO |
|---|---|---|
| First downs | | |
| Total yards | | |
| Rushing yards | | |
| Passing yards | | |
| Passing: Comp–Att–Int | | |
| Time of possession | | |

| Team | Category | Player | Statistics |
|---|---|---|---|
| North Alabama | Passing | | |
| North Alabama | Rushing | | |
| North Alabama | Receiving | | |
| Southeast Missouri State | Passing | | |
| Southeast Missouri State | Rushing | | |
| Southeast Missouri State | Receiving | | |

=== Northeastern State (DII) ===
Northeastern State RiverHawks (DII) (1-1) vs. North Alabama Lions (0-2) – Game summary

| Quarter | 1 | 2 | 3 | 4 | Total |
|---|---|---|---|---|---|
| RiverHawks (DII) | 0 | 8 | 13 | 0 | 21 |
| Lions | 14 | 23 | 9 | 3 | 49 |

at Braly Municipal Stadium • Florence, AL

- Date: September 13
- Game time: 6:00 p.m. CDT
- Game weather: Sunny • Temperature: 86 °F (30 °C) • Wind: SE at 3 miles per hour (4.8 km/h)
- Game attendance: 9,739
- Referee: Andrew Ison
- TV announcers (ESPN+): Benjamin Ray (play-by-play), Bryan Neece (analyst) and Lynden Blake (sideline)

Game information

First Quarter

- (8:41) UNA – Jayvian Allen 6-yard run (Ian Vachon kick) (Drive: 9 plays, 50 yards, 3:53; UNA 7-0)
- (4:32) UNA – Jalyn Daniels 36-yard run (Ian Vachon kick) (Drive: 5 plays, 56 yards, 1:57; UNA 14-0)

Second Quarter

- (12:45) UNA – Ian Vachon 22-yard field goal (Drive: 5 plays, 51 yards, 2:12; UNA 17-0)
- (5:49) UNA – Jayvian Allen 2-yard run (Ian Vachon kick) (Drive: 9 plays, 88 yards, 4:58; UNA 24-0)
- (2:55) UNA – L.T. Sanders 1-yard run (Ian Vachon kick) (Drive: 6 plays, 41 yards, 2:42; UNA 31-0)
- (1:30) NEOS – Ramon McKinney Jr 64-yard pass from Dereun Dortch (Deuce Roberson rush) (Drive: 5 plays, 75 yards, 1:25; UNA 31-8)
- (0:06) UNA – Noah Gregg 3-yard pass from Destin Wade (Ian Vachon kick no good) (Drive: 6 plays, 41 yards, 2:42; UNA 37-8)

Third Quarter

- (11:55) UNA – Ian Vachon 27-yard field goal (Drive: 7 plays, 60 yards, 3:00; UNA 40-8)
- (8:40) UNA – Jalen Fletcher 6-yard run (Ian Vachon kick no good) (Drive: 4 plays, 38 yards, 1:53; UNA 46-8)
- (7:46) NEOS – Deuce Roberson 46-yard pass from Donnie Smith (Troy Nguyen kick) (Drive: 5 plays, 75 yards, 0:48; UNA 46-15)
- (3:57) NEOS – Cam Woods 28-yard pass from Donnie Smith (Two point conversion failed) (Drive: 6 plays, 74 yards, 2:59; UNA 46-21)

Fourth Quarter

- (1:51) UNA – Ian Vachon 55-yard field goal (Drive: 4 plays, 1 yards, 1:32; UNA 49-21)

| Statistics | NEOS | UNA |
|---|---|---|
| First downs | 16 | 19 |
| Total yards | 379 | 500 |
| Rushing yards | 17 | 301 |
| Passing yards | 362 | 199 |
| Passing: Comp–Att–Int | 23–51–2 | 14–22–0 |
| Time of possession | 25:18 | 34:42 |

| Team | Category | Player | Statistics |
|---|---|---|---|
| Northeastern State | Passing | Donnie Smith | 18/35, 222 yards, 2 TD, 2 INT |
| Northeastern State | Rushing | Ramon McKinney Jr | 8 carries, 36 yards |
| Northeastern State | Receiving | Ramon McKinney Jr | 5 receptions, 94 yards, 1 TD |
| North Alabama | Passing | Destin Wade | 11/15, 161 yards, 1 TD |
| North Alabama | Rushing | Jayvian Allen | 8 carries, 91 yards, 2 TD |
| North Alabama | Receiving | Kaleb Heatherly | 3 receptions, 68 yards |

=== at No. 6 Illinois State ===
| Overall record | Previous meeting | Previous winner | Score |
|---|---|---|---|
| 0–1 | September 7, 2024 | Illinois State | 17–24 |

North Alabama Lions (1-2) vs. No. 6 Illinois State Redbirds (2-1) – Game summary

| Quarter | 1 | 2 | 3 | 4 | OT | 2OT | Total |
|---|---|---|---|---|---|---|---|
| Lions | 0 | 7 | 7 | 13 | 3 | 6 | 36 |
| No. 6 Redbirds | 3 | 14 | 7 | 3 | 3 | 8 | 38 |

at Hancock Stadium • Normal, IL

- Date: September 20
- Game time: 12:00 PM CDT
- Game weather: Cloudy • Temperature: 79 °F (26 °C)
- Game attendance: 11,287
- Referee: John Shay
- TV announcers (ESPN+): Kurt Pegler (play-by-play), Clay Harbor (analyst) and Kalia Butler (sideline)

Game information

First Quarter

- (5:18) ILST – Matt Maldonado 42-yard field goal (Drive: 6 plays, 32 yards, 1:50; ILST 3-0)

Second Quarter

- (14:21) ILST – Wenkers Wright 38-yard run (Matt Maldonado kick) (Drive: 6 plays, 80 yards, 2:00; ILST 10-0)
- (9:42) ILST – Luke Mailander 10-yard pass from Tommy Rittenhouse (Matt Maldonado kick) (Drive: 5 plays, 68 yards, 2:05; ILST 17-0)
- (0:09) UNA – Noah Gregg 10-yard pass from Ari Patu (Ian Vachon kick) (Drive: 6 plays, 45 yards, 0:22; ILST 17-7)

Third Quarter

- (9:24) UNA – Jayvian Allen 1-yard run (Ian Vachon kick) (Drive: 9 plays, 61 yards, 4:08; ILST 17-14)
- (1:54) ILST – Daniel Sobkowicz 6-yard pass from Tommy Rittenhouse (Matt Maldonado kick) (Drive: 8 plays, 46 yards, 2:52; ILST 24-14)

Fourth Quarter

- (5:54) UNA – Justin Pegues 39-yard pass from Ari Patu (Ian Vachon kick) (Drive: 13 plays, 90 yards, 5:26; ILST 24-21)
- (2:36) ILST – Matt Maldonado 51-yard field goal (Drive: 6 plays, 41 yards, 3:06; ILST 27-21)
- (0:33) UNA – KJ Fields 25-yard pass from Ari Patu (Ian Vachon kick no good) (Drive: 9 plays, 75 yards, 2:03; Tied 27-27)

Overtime

- UNA – Ian Vachon 42-yard field goal (Drive: 4 plays, 1 yards; UNA 30-27)
- ILST – Matt Maldonado 38-yard field goal (Drive: 4 plays, 4 yards; Tied 30-30)

Double overtime

- ILST – Daniel Sobkowicz 25-yard pass from Tommy Rittenhouse (Daniel Sobkowicz pass) (Drive: 1 play, 25 yards; ILST 38-30)
- UNA – Justin Pegues 18-yard pass from Ari Patu (Two point conversion failed) (Drive: 4 plays, 25 yards; ILST 38-36)

| Statistics | UNA | ILST |
|---|---|---|
| First downs | 24 | 29 |
| Total yards | 409 | 506 |
| Rushing yards | 144 | 217 |
| Passing yards | 265 | 289 |
| Passing: Comp–Att–Int | 22–37–1 | 21–37–0 |
| Time of possession | 30:30 | 29:30 |

| Team | Category | Player | Statistics |
|---|---|---|---|
| North Alabama | Passing | Ari Patu | 17/31, 243 yards, 4 TD, INT |
| North Alabama | Rushing | Ari Patu | 14 carries, 60 yards |
| North Alabama | Receiving | KJ Fields | 7 receptions, 94 yards, TD |
| Illinois State | Passing | Tommy Rittenhouse | 20/36, 250 yards, 3 TD |
| Illinois State | Rushing | Tommy Rittenhouse | 9 carries, 89 yards |
| Illinois State | Receiving | Daniel Sobkowicz | 10 receptions, 150 yards, 2 TD |

=== at No. 19 Abilene Christian ===
| Overall record | Previous meeting | Previous winner | Score |
|---|---|---|---|
| 2–1 | October 7, 2024 | North Alabama | 47–34 |

North Alabama Lions (1-3) vs. No. 19 Abilene Christian Wildcats (2-3) – Game summary

| Quarter | 1 | 2 | 3 | 4 | Total |
|---|---|---|---|---|---|
| Lions | 0 | 7 | 3 | 13 | 23 |
| No. 19 Wildcats | 14 | 14 | 17 | 7 | 52 |

at Wildcat Stadium • Abilene, TX

- Date: October 4
- Game time: 2:00 p.m. CDT
- Game weather: Sunny • Temperature: 85 °F (29 °C) • Wind: S at 12 miles per hour (19 km/h)
- Game attendance: 7,377
- Referee: Matthew Jones
- TV announcers (ESPN+): Andy Penney (play-by-play) and Jim Reese (analyst)

Game information

First Quarter

- (5:51) ACU – Grant Jones 1-yard run (Brandon Perez kick) (Drive: 7 plays, 76 yards, 3:27; ACU 7-0)
- (1:47) ACU – Javon Gipson 39-yard pass from Stone Earle (Brandon Perez kick) (Drive: 4 plays, 67 yards, 2:02; ACU 14-0)

Second Quarter

- (9:50) ACU – Bryan Henry 13-yard pass from Stone Earle (Brandon Perez kick) (Drive: 10 plays, 85 yards, 5:27; ACU 21-0)
- (6:01) UNA – Jayvian Allen 29-yard run (Ian Vachon kick) (Drive: 9 plays, 75 yards, 3:47; ACU 21-7)
- (0:55) ACU – Bryan Henry 1-yard pass from Stone Earle (Brandon Perez kick) (Drive: 6 plays, 20 yards, 2:20; ACU 28-7)

Third Quarter

- (11:23) ACU – JJ Henry 28-yard pass from Stone Earle (Brandon Perez kick) (Drive: 6 plays, 59 yards, 3:30; ACU 35-7)
- (4:13) ACU – Brandon Perez 35-yard field goal (Drive: 8 plays, 18 yards, 3:32; ACU 38-7)
- (2:13) UNA – Ian Vachon 40-yard field goal (Drive: 8 plays, 44 yards, 2:00; ACU 38-10)
- (2:01) ACU – Jordan Vaughan 75-yard run (Brandon Perez kick) (Drive: 1 plays, 75 yards, 3:27; ACU 45-10)

Fourth Quarter

- (10:15) UNA – Kaden Cooper 15-yard pass from DC Tabscott (Ian Vachon missed kick) (Drive: 9 plays, 85 yards, 4:34; ACU 45-16)
- (9:11) UNA – Tanaka Scott 24-yard pass from DC Tabscott (Ian Vachon kick) (Drive: 4 plays, 41 yards, 1:03; ACU 45-23)
- (4:48) ACU – EJ Wilson Jr 10-yard run (Brandon Perez kick) (Drive: 9 plays, 50 yards, 4:22; ACU 52-23)

| Statistics | UNA | ACU |
|---|---|---|
| First downs | 15 | 24 |
| Total yards | 297 | 499 |
| Rushing yards | 133 | 230 |
| Passing yards | 164 | 269 |
| Passing: Comp–Att–Int | 15–31–0 | 23–33–1 |
| Time of possession | 24:20 | 35:39 |

| Team | Category | Player | Statistics |
|---|---|---|---|
| North Alabama | Passing | DC Tabscott | 12/25, 144 yards, 2 TD |
| North Alabama | Rushing | Jayvian Allen | 11 carries, 102 yards, 1 TD |
| North Alabama | Receiving | Tanaka Scott | 4 receptions, 60 yards, 1 TD |
| Abilene Christian | Passing | Stone Earle | 22/32, 261 yards, 4 TD, 1 INT |
| Abilene Christian | Rushing | Jordon Vaughn | 4 carries, 84 yards, 1 TD |
| Abilene Christian | Receiving | Javon Gipson | 3 receptions, 69 yards, 1 TD |

=== Central Arkansas ===
Central Arkansas Bears (2-4) vs. North Alabama Lions (1-4) – Game summary

| Quarter | 1 | 2 | 3 | 4 | Total |
|---|---|---|---|---|---|
| Bears | 7 | 28 | 7 | 7 | 49 |
| Lions | 7 | 7 | 0 | 7 | 21 |

at Braly Municipal Stadium • Florence, AL

- Date: October 11
- Game time: 3:00 p.m.
- Game weather: Sunny • Temperature: 79 °F (26 °C) • Wind: SW at 4 miles per hour (6.4 km/h)
- Game attendance: 9,125
- Referee: Jeremee Tate
- TV announcers (ESPN+): Benjamin Ray (play-by-play), Bryan Neece (analyst) and Arielle Schafer (sideline)

Game information

First Quarter

- (12:44) UCA – Landen Chambers 1-yard run (Caleb Jones kick) (Drive: 2 plays, 57 yards, 0:22; UCA 7-0)
- (3:40) UNA – Noah Gregg 19-yard pass from Ari Patu (Chandler Dixon kick) (Drive: 8 plays, 68 yards, 3:33; Tied 7-7)

Second Quarter

- (14:31) UNA – KJ Fields 4-yard run (Chandler Dixon kick) (Drive: 8 plays, 64 yards, 3:07; UNA 14-7)
- (13:52) UCA – Tyrell Pollard 76-yard pass from Austin Myers (Caleb Jones kick) (Drive: 2 plays, 75 yards, 0:39; Tied 14-14)
- (11:11) UCA – Landen Chambers 19-yard run (Caleb Jones kick) (Drive: 6 plays, 45 yards, 2:27; UCA 21-14)
- (3:11) UCA – Landen Chambers 11-yard run (Caleb Jones kick) (Drive: 8 plays, 57 yards, 2:54; UCA 28-14)
- (0:55) UCA – Malachi Henry 37-yard pass from Austin Myers (Caleb Jones kick) (Drive: 3 plays, 48 yards, 0:45; UCA 35-14)

Third Quarter

- (8:48) UCA – Cameron Young 13-yard run (Caleb Jones kick) (Drive: 7 plays, 87 yards, 2:04; UCA 42-14)

Fourth Quarter

- (11:56) UCA – Malachi Henry 13-yard pass from Austin Myers (Caleb Jones kick) (Drive: 5 plays, 29 yards, 2:54; UCA 49-14)
- (7:02) UNA – Justin Pegues 7-yard pass from Destin Wade (Chandler Dixon kick) (Drive: 13 plays, 62 yards, 4:46; UCA 49-21)

| Statistics | CARK | UNA |
|---|---|---|
| First downs | 26 | 25 |
| Total yards | 486 | 290 |
| Rushing yards | 254 | 93 |
| Passing yards | 232 | 197 |
| Passing: Comp–Att–Int | 11–22–0 | 19–42–2 |
| Time of possession | 29:47 | 30:13 |

| Team | Category | Player | Statistics |
|---|---|---|---|
| Central Arkansas | Passing | Austin Myers | 11/22, 232 yards, 3 TD |
| Central Arkansas | Rushing | Landen Chambers | 24 carries, 184 yards, 3 TD |
| Central Arkansas | Receiving | Malachi Henry | 5 receptions, 119 yards, 2 TD |
| North Alabama | Passing | Ari Patu | 12/19, 111 yards, 1 TD, 2 INT |
| North Alabama | Rushing | Jayvian Allen | 13 carries, 69 yards |
| North Alabama | Receiving | Jayvian Allen | 5 receptions, 81 yards |

=== Eastern Kentucky ===
Eastern Kentucky Colonels (3-3) vs. North Alabama Lions (1-5) – Game summary

| Quarter | 1 | 2 | 3 | 4 | Total |
|---|---|---|---|---|---|
| Colonels | 0 | 7 | 0 | 7 | 14 |
| Lions | 7 | 7 | 14 | 7 | 35 |

at Braly Municipal Stadium • Florence, AL

- Date: October 18
- Game weather: Temperature: 81 °F (27 °C) • Wind:SE at 9 miles per hour (14 km/h)
- Game attendance: 8,922
- Referee: John Kellermeier
- TV announcers (ESPN+): Benjamin Ray (play-by-play), Bryan Neece (analyst) and Arielle Schafer (sideline)

Game information

First Quarter

- (1:13) UNA – Jayvian Allen 1-yard run (Chandler Dixon kick) (Drive: 3 plays, 24 yards, 1:07; UNA 7-0)

Second Quarter

- (3:33) EKU – Marcus Calwise Jr 27-yard pass from Myles Burkett (Buzz Flabiano kick) (Drive: 11 plays, 81 yards, 5:01; Tied 7-7)
- (0:20) UNA – Noah Gregg 18-yard pass from Destin Wade (Chandler Dixon kick) (Drive: 13 plays, 75 yards, 3:24; UNA 14-7)

Third Quarter

- (10:40) UNA – Kaleb Heatherly 5-yard pass from Destin Wade (Chandler Dixon kick) (Drive: 9 plays, 82 yards, 4:14; UNA 21-7)
- (0:19) UNA – Jayvian Allen 2-yard run (Chandler Dixon kick) (Drive: 12 plays, 80 yards, 6:55; UNA 28-7)

Fourth Quarter

- (6:28) UNA – Jayvian Allen 23-yard run (Chandler Dixon kick) (Drive: 5 plays, 30 yards, 2:52; UNA 35-7)
- (3:49) EKU – Brady Hensley 32-yard run (Buzz Flabiano kick) (Drive: 7 plays, 63 yards, 2:35; UNA 35-14)

| Statistics | EKU | UNA |
|---|---|---|
| First downs | 17 | 25 |
| Total yards | 296 | 412 |
| Rushing yards | 134 | 285 |
| Passing yards | 162 | 127 |
| Passing: Comp–Att–Int | 17–32–1 | 11–18–0 |
| Time of possession | 24:41 | 35:19 |

| Team | Category | Player | Statistics |
|---|---|---|---|
| Eastern Kentucky | Passing | Myles Burkett | 14/26, 133 yards, 1 TD, 1 INT |
| Eastern Kentucky | Rushing | Brayden Latham | 10 carries, 76 yards |
| Eastern Kentucky | Receiving | Marcus Calwise Jr | 4 receptions, 63 yards, 1 TD |
| North Alabama | Passing | Destin Wade | 11/18, 127 yards, 2 TD |
| North Alabama | Rushing | Destin Wade | 21 carries, 109 yards |
| North Alabama | Receiving | Justin Pegues | 3 receptions, 37 yards |

=== at No. 25 Austin Peay ===
North Alabama Lions (2-5) vs. No. 25 Austin Peay Governors (4-3) – Game summary

| Quarter | 1 | 2 | 3 | 4 | Total |
|---|---|---|---|---|---|
| Lions | - | - | - | - | 0 |
| No. 25 Governors | - | - | - | - | 0 |

at Fortera Stadium • Clarksville, TN

- Date: October 25

| Statistics | UNA | APSU |
|---|---|---|
| First downs | | |
| Total yards | | |
| Rushing yards | | |
| Passing yards | | |
| Passing: Comp–Att–Int | | |
| Time of possession | | |

| Team | Category | Player | Statistics |
|---|---|---|---|
| North Alabama | Passing | | |
| North Alabama | Rushing | | |
| North Alabama | Receiving | | |
| Austin Peay | Passing | | |
| Austin Peay | Rushing | | |
| Austin Peay | Receiving | | |

=== at Utah Tech ===
North Alabama Lions (2-6) vs. Utah Tech Trailblazers (1-7) – Game summary

| Quarter | 1 | 2 | 3 | 4 | Total |
|---|---|---|---|---|---|
| Lions | - | - | - | - | 0 |
| Trailblazers | - | - | - | - | 0 |

at Greater Zion Stadium • St. George, UT

- Date: November 1
- Game time: 2:00 PM MDT

| Statistics | UNA | UTU |
|---|---|---|
| First downs | | |
| Total yards | | |
| Rushing yards | | |
| Passing yards | | |
| Passing: Comp–Att–Int | | |
| Time of possession | | |

| Team | Category | Player | Statistics |
|---|---|---|---|
| North Alabama | Passing | | |
| North Alabama | Rushing | | |
| North Alabama | Receiving | | |
| Utah Tech | Passing | | |
| Utah Tech | Rushing | | |
| Utah Tech | Receiving | | |

=== West Georgia ===
West Georgia Wolves (6-3) vs. North Alabama Lions (2-7) – Game summary

| Quarter | 1 | 2 | 3 | 4 | Total |
|---|---|---|---|---|---|
| Wolves | - | - | - | - | 0 |
| Lions | - | - | - | - | 0 |

at Braly Municipal Stadium • Florence, AL

- Date: November 8

| Statistics | UWG | UNA |
|---|---|---|
| First downs | | |
| Total yards | | |
| Rushing yards | | |
| Passing yards | | |
| Passing: Comp–Att–Int | | |
| Time of possession | | |

| Team | Category | Player | Statistics |
|---|---|---|---|
| West Georgia | Passing | | |
| West Georgia | Rushing | | |
| West Georgia | Receiving | | |
| North Alabama | Passing | | |
| North Alabama | Rushing | | |
| North Alabama | Receiving | | |

=== at No. 6 Tarleton State ===
North Alabama Lions (2-8) vs. No. 6 Tarleton State Texans (9-1) – Game summary

| Quarter | 1 | 2 | 3 | 4 | Total |
|---|---|---|---|---|---|
| Lions | - | - | - | - | 0 |
| No. 6 Texans | - | - | - | - | 0 |

at Memorial Stadium • Stephenville, TX

- Date: November 15

| Statistics | UNA | TAR |
|---|---|---|
| First downs | | |
| Total yards | | |
| Rushing yards | | |
| Passing yards | | |
| Passing: Comp–Att–Int | | |
| Time of possession | | |

| Team | Category | Player | Statistics |
|---|---|---|---|
| North Alabama | Passing | | |
| North Alabama | Rushing | | |
| North Alabama | Receiving | | |
| Tarleton State | Passing | | |
| Tarleton State | Rushing | | |
| Tarleton State | Receiving | | |

=== Southern Utah ===
Southern Utah Thunderbirds (6-5) vs. North Alabama Lions (2-9) – Game summary

| Quarter | 1 | 2 | 3 | 4 | OT | 2OT | Total |
|---|---|---|---|---|---|---|---|
| Thunderbirds | 0 | 14 | 0 | 14 | 0 | 8 | 36 |
| Lions | 14 | 7 | 0 | 7 | 0 | 6 | 34 |

at Braly Municipal Stadium • Florence, AL

- Date: November 22
- Game time: 1:00 p.m. CDT
- Game weather: Sunny • Temperature: 74 °F (23 °C) • Wind: SE at 7 miles per hour (11 km/h)
- Game attendance: 7,632
- Referee: Zachary Erdmann
- TV announcers (ESPN+/WAFF 48.3): Benjamin Ray (play-by-play), Bryan Neece (analyst) and Arielle Schafer (sideline)

| Statistics | SUU | UNA |
|---|---|---|
| First downs | 19 | 22 |
| Total yards | 436 | 342 |
| Rushing yards | 173 | 115 |
| Passing yards | 263 | 227 |
| Passing: Comp–Att–Int | 20–27–0 | 15–22–0 |
| Time of possession | 26:39 | 31:36 |

| Team | Category | Player | Statistics |
|---|---|---|---|
| Southern Utah | Passing | Bronson Barron | 18/23, 236 yards, 1 TD |
| Southern Utah | Rushing | Joshua Dye | 23 carries, 103 yards, 3 TD |
| Southern Utah | Receiving | Shane Carr | 6 receptions, 85 yards |
| North Alabama | Passing | John Austin Wood | 15/22, 227 yards, 2 TD |
| North Alabama | Rushing | Jalyn Daniels | 11 carries, 39 yards |
| North Alabama | Receiving | Tanaka Scott | 6 receptions, 114 yards, 1 TD |

== Roster ==
2025 North Alabama Lions football team roster
Players
Coaches
Offense

| Pos. | # | Name | Class |
|---|---|---|---|
| WR | 0 | Justin Pegues | Sr |
| QB | 1 | Ari Patu | GS |
| WR | 2 | Tanaka Scott | Sr |
| QB | 3 | Ty Watkins | So |
| RB | 4 | LT Sanders | Sr |
| QB | 5 | Destin Wade | So |
| RB | 6 | Jayvian Allen | Sr |
| QB | 7 | DC Tabscott | Sr |
| WR, DB | 8 | Justin Luke | Sr |
| WR | 9 | Jeremiah Thomas | Fr |
| WR | 10 | KJ Fields | Jr |
| RB | 11 | Jalyn Daniels | Sr |
| WR | 13 | Azariah Fletcher | Fr |
| WR | 19 | Omareon Finch | So |
| QB | 20 | John Austin Wood | Fr |
| WR | 23 | Kaden Cooper | Jr |
| QB | 24 | Kesean Pryor | Fr |
| RB | 26 | Logan Thornton | Fr |
| RB | 28 | Jalen Fletcher | So |
| RB | 32 | Roderick Taylor Jr. | Fr |
| RB | 37 | Hunter Palmer | Fr |
| RB | 38 | Nic Strong | So |
| TE | 43 | Micah Christensen | Fr |
| TE | 48 | Carter Tinkler | Fr |
| OL | 51 | Ryan Walker | So |
| OL | 52 | Eli Long | Fr |
| TE, LS | 54 | Braden Forscutt | Fr |
| OL | 56 | Matthew Wells | Fr |
| OL | 58 | Drew Lawson | GS |
| OL | 59 | Jon Lawrence | Fr |
| OL | 60 | Neyland Baker | Fr |
| OL | 62 | Carson Wheeler | Fr |
| OL | 64 | Dominic Braesch | So |
| OL | 65 | Collin Wright | Jr |
| OL | 66 | Julian Navarrete | Jr |
| OL | 69 | Shane McNatt | Fr |
| OL | 70 | Eric Williams Jr. | Fr |
| OL | 71 | Noah Bolticoff | GS |
| OL | 72 | Witt Mitchum | Sr |
| OL | 73 | Tyler Burkett | Fr |
| OL | 74 | Gage Saint | Sr |
| OL | 76 | Noah Smith | Fr |
| OL | 77 | Trot English | Fr |
| OL | 78 | Anthony Bauer | GS |
| OL | 79 | Raykwon Goldthwaite | Jr |
| WR | 80 | Daniel Cooper | So |
| WR | 82 | Clint Houser | Fr |
| WR | 83 | Myron Dunklin | Fr |
| QB | 84 | Dawson Simmons | Fr |
| WR | 85 | Noah Gregg | Fr |
| TE | 86 | Amarie Rodgers | So |
| TE | 87 | Nathan Brockway | So |
| TE | 88 | Kaleb Heatherly | Sr |
| TE | 96 | Logan White | Fr |
| WR | | Jaden Barnes | Fr |
| OL | | Wyatt Davis | Fr |
| WR | | Brannon Oliver | Fr |
| RB | | Jaylen Simpson | Fr |
| QB | | Brock Stomps | Fr |

Defense

| Pos. | # | Name | Class |
|---|---|---|---|
| LB | 1 | Tango McCauley Jr. | So |
| DL | 2 | Jamari Payne | Fr |
| DB | 3 | Jermaine Ray Jr. | Sr |
| DB | 4 | Travis Collier | Sr |
| LB | 5 | Demarcious Robinson | Sr |
| DB | 6 | Davon Martin | Sr |
| DB | 7 | Justin Davis | Jr |
| DB | 9 | Brian Dilworth | Jr |
| LB | 10 | Bishop Burkhalter | Fr |
| DB | 12 | Michael Jordan Jr. | Sr |
| LB | 13 | Quinterrius Robinson | Fr |
| DB | 14 | Tae Martin | Fr |
| DE | 15 | Avery Howard | So |
| LB | 16 | Raelon Sims | Fr |
| DL | 17 | Christian Burkhalter | Jr |
| LB | 18 | Seth Hampton | Jr |
| DB | 20 | Anthony Young | Fr |
| DB | 21 | Lonell Cunningham II | Jr |
| DB | 22 | Leo Glover | Fr |
| DB | 24 | Cameron Jamar | Sr |
| DB | 25 | Kemon Folse | Fr |
| DB | 30 | Drake Fowler | Fr |
| DB | 31 | Treyvon Avery | Fr |
| DB | 31 | John Taylor | So |
| DL | 33 | E.J. Colbert | Sr |
| DB | 39 | Josiah Hixon | So |
| LB | 40 | Aidan Robinson | Sr |
| DL | 41 | Walter Goggins | So |
| DB | 42 | Tanner Caudle | Fr |
| DL | 44 | Jyheam Ingram | Jr |
| DL | 45 | Jalin Edwards | Fr |
| DB | 46 | Joshua Cooper | Fr |
| DL | 49 | Matt Heard | Fr |
| DL | 55 | Rayqwon Smith | So |
| DL | 57 | Fred Vili | So |
| DL | 68 | Joshua Seudass | So |
| DB | 81 | Noah Fuller | Sr |
| DE | 90 | Zacchaeus Dixon | So |
| DL | 94 | Trace Allen | Fr |
| DL | 97 | Reginald Moseley | Fr |
| DL | 98 | Lance Bassett | So |
| DL | 99 | Kaleb Brown | Sr |
| DB | | Michael Barksdale | Jr |
| DB | | Zytavien Boddie | Fr |
| DB | | Magnum Henderson | Fr |
| DB | | Donovan Hudson | Fr |
| DL | | Kingston Lowe | So |
| DB | | Alex McLeod | Fr |

Special teams

| Pos. | # | Name | Class |
|---|---|---|---|
| K | 29 | Tyler Wallace | Fr |
| K | 34 | Ian Vachon | Jr |
| P | 35 | Adam Watford | Jr |
| K, P | 36 | Jack Rice | Jr |
| LS | 47 | Nathan Curry | Jr |
| K | 89 | Chandler Dixon | Fr |

Head coach

- Brent Dearmon

Coordinators/assistant coaches

- Brock Caraboa – Assistant head coach/defensive coordinator
- Morgan Cruce – Offensive coordinator/tight ends/director of football operations
- Luke Roth – Special teams coordinator/nickels
- Craig Schurig – Quarterbacks
- Michael Johnson – Running backs
- K. J. Maye – Wide receivers
- Ben Thomas – Offensive line
- Steve Carter – Defensive line
- De'Von Lockett – Defensive backs
- DeeAndra Ervin – Safeties
- Kyle Persons – Defensive analyst
- Tiger Jones – Director of football performance
- Ben Hamner – Director of player personnel

Legend

- (C) Team captain
- (S) Suspended
- (I) Ineligible
- Injured
- Redshirt

Roster
Last update: June 26, 2026

== Rankings ==
Ranking movements Legend: ██ Increase in ranking ██ Decrease in ranking — = Not ranked RV = Received votes
| | Week | | | | | | | | | | | | | | |
| Poll | Pre | 1 | 2 | 3 | 4 | 5 | 6 | 7 | 8 | 9 | 10 | 11 | 12 | 13 | Final |
|---|---|---|---|---|---|---|---|---|---|---|---|---|---|---|---|
| Coaches | — | — | RV | — | — | — | — | — | — | — | — | — | — | — | — |
