= 2025 Southern Utah Thunderbirds football team =

American college football season

2025 Southern Utah Thunderbirds football
- Conference: United Athletic Conference
- Record: 7–5 (6–2 UAC)
- Head coach: DeLane Fitzgerald (4th season)
- Defensive coordinator: John Kelling (4th season)
- Home stadium: Eccles Coliseum

2025 United Athletic Conference standings
	Conf.			Overall
Team	W		L	W		L
No. 12 Abilene Christian +^	7	–	1	9	–	5
No. 6 Tarleton State +^	7	–	1	12	–	2
Southern Utah	6	–	2	7	–	5
West Georgia*	5	–	3	8	–	3
Austin Peay	4	–	4	7	–	5
Eastern Kentucky	3	–	5	5	–	7
Central Arkansas	2	–	6	3	–	9
Utah Tech	1	–	7	2	–	10
North Alabama	1	–	7	2	–	10
+ – Conference co-champions; ^ – FCS playoff participant; * – Ineligible for the UAC title and FCS postseason play due to transition from NCAA Division II.; Rankings from STATS Poll

The 2025 Southern Utah Thunderbirds football team represented Southern Utah University as a member of the United Athletic Conference (UAC) during the 2025 NCAA Division I FCS football season. The Thunderbirds were led by fourth-year head coach DeLane Fitzgerald and played their home games at the Eccles Coliseum in Cedar City, Utah.

== Schedule ==
Date	Time	Opponent	Rank	Site	TV	Result	Attendance
August 30	6:30 p.m.	Idaho State*		Eccles Coliseum; Cedar City, UT	ESPN+	W 46–24	5,137
September 6	7:00 p.m.	at San Diego*	No. 24	Torero Stadium; San Diego, CA	ESPN+	L 27–30	2,564
September 13	6:30 p.m.	No. 18 Northern Arizona*		Eccles Coliseum; Cedar City, UT (Grand Canyon Rivalry)	ESPN+	L 49–52	3,084
September 20	8:00 p.m.	at No. 9 UC Davis*		UC Davis Health Stadium; Davis, CA	ESPN+	L 34–50	17,217
September 27	6:30 p.m.	No. 18 West Georgia^{†}		Eccles Coliseum; Cedar City, UT	ESPN+	L 24–27	5,769
October 4	5:00 p.m.	at No. 3 Tarleton State		Memorial Stadium; Stephenville, TX	ESPN+	L 42–52	16,412
October 18	6:30 p.m.	No. 13 Abilene Christian		Eccles Coliseum; Cedar City, UT	ESPN+	W 31–24	2,030
October 25	6:00 p.m.	at Utah Tech		Greater Zion Stadium; St. George, UT	ESPN+	W 28–7	6,814
November 1	6:30 p.m.	No. 22 Austin Peay		Eccles Coliseum; Cedar City, UT	ESPN+	W 33–17	2,808
November 8	1:00 p.m.	at Eastern Kentucky		Roy Kidd Stadium; Richmond, KY	ESPN+	W 27–17	4,093
November 15	6:30 p.m.	Central Arkansas		Eccles Coliseum; Cedar City, UT	ESPN+	W 28–21	3,257
November 22	12:00 p.m.	at North Alabama		Braly Municipal Stadium; Florence, AL	ESPN+	W 36–34 ^{2OT}	7,632
*Non-conference game; ^{†}Homecoming; Rankings from STATS Poll released prior to the game; All times are in Mountain time

== Game summaries ==
=== vs Idaho State ===
Idaho State Bengals (0–1) at Southern Utah Thunderbirds (0–0) – Game summary

Quarter	1	2	3	4	Total
Bengals	0	14	7	3	24
Thunderbirds	15	10	14	7	46

at Eccles Coliseum • Cedar City, Utah

- Date: August 30
- Game time: 6:30 p.m. MDT
- Game attendance: 5,137
- Referee: Zachary Erdman
- TV: ESPN+

Game information

First quarter

- SUU – Gabe Nunez 22-yard pass from Bronson Barron (Bronson Barron–Gabe Nunez pass), 10:32. Thunderbirds 8–0. Drive: 5 plays, 52 yards, 2:26.
- SUU – Mark Bails 13-yard pass from Bronson Barron (Jayden Rogers kick), 3:06. Thunderbirds 15–0. Drive: 7 plays, 60 yards, 3:02.

Second quarter

- SUU – Joshua Dye 32-yard run (Jayden Rogers kick), 13:19. Thunderbirds 22–0. Drive: 4 plays, 67 yards, 1:27.
- IDST – Damien Morgan 19-yard pass from Jordan Cooke (Trajan Sinatra kick), 10:35. Thunderbirds 22–7. Drive: 7 plays, 75 yards, 2:44.
- IDST – Mason Young 15-yard fumble return (Trajan Sinatra kick), 10:20. Thunderbirds 22–14.
- SUU – Jayden Rogers 20-yard field goal, 4:45. Thunderbirds 25–14. Drive: 10 plays, 72 yards, 5:35.

Third quarter

- SUU – Niko Alailefaleula 4-yard pass from Bronson Barron (Jayden Rogers kick), 9:45. Thunderbirds 32–14. Drive: 10 plays, 75 yards, 5:15.
- SUU – Will Burns 72-yard run (Jayden Rogers kick), 7:01. Thunderbirds 39–14. Drive: 4 plays, 91 yards, 2:13.
- IDST – Brett Spencer 1-yard run (Trajan Sinatra kick), 2:59. Thunderbirds 39–21. Drive: 9 plays, 75 yards, 4:02.

Fourth quarter

- IDST – Trajan Sinatra 40-yard field goal, 14:45. Thunderbirds 39–24. Drive: 9 plays, 57 yards, 1:48.
- SUU – Joshua Dye 19-yard run (Jayden Rogers kick), 4:04. Thunderbirds 46–24. Drive: 11 plays, 98 yards, 6:14.

Statistics	IDST	SUU
First downs	19	28
Plays–yards	66–361	75–563
Rushes–yards	16–23	50–323
Passing yards	338	240
Passing: Comp–Att–Int	24–50–1	19–25–0
Turnovers	1	1
Time of possession	22:47	37:13

Team	Category	Player	Statistics
Idaho State	Passing	Jordan Cooke	23/45, 334 yards, TD, INT
Idaho State	Rushing	Tytan Mason	3 carries, 15 yards
Idaho State	Receiving	Michael Shulikov	7 receptions, 115 yards
Southern Utah	Passing	Bronson Barron	19/25, 240 yards, 3 TD
Southern Utah	Rushing	Joshua Dye	28 carries, 180 yards, 2 TD
Southern Utah	Receiving	Shane Carr	6 receptions, 77 yards

=== at San Diego ===
No. 24 Southern Utah Thunderbirds (1-0) at San Diego Toreros (0-1) – Game summary

Quarter	1	2	3	4	Total
No. 24 Thunderbirds	-	-	-	-	0
Toreros	-	-	-	-	0

at Torero Stadium • San Diego, CA

- Date: September 6
- Game time: 6:00 PM PDT
- TV: ESPN+

Statistics	SUU	USD
First downs		
Total yards		
Rushing yards		
Passing yards		
Passing: Comp–Att–Int		
Time of possession		

Team	Category	Player	Statistics
Southern Utah	Passing		
Southern Utah	Rushing		
Southern Utah	Receiving		
San Diego	Passing		
San Diego	Rushing		
San Diego	Receiving		

=== No. 18 Northern Arizona (Grand Canyon Rivalry) ===
No. 18 Northern Arizona Lumberjacks (1–1) at Southern Utah Thunderbirds (1–1) – Game summary

Quarter	1	2	3	4	Total
No. 18 Lumberjacks	7	7	28	10	52
Thunderbirds	7	7	14	21	49

at Eccles Coliseum • Cedar City, UT

- Date: September 13
- Game time: 6:30 p.m. MDT
- Game attendance: 3,084
- Referee: Matthew Jones
- TV announcers (ESPN+): Spencer McLaughlin (play-by-play), Dallin Richards (analyst) and Kendall McGuire (sideline)

Game information

First quarter

- NAU – Kolbe Katsis 12-yard pass from Ty Pennington (Samuel Hunsaker kick), 11:58. Lumberjacks 7–0. Drive: 6 plays, 75 yards, 3:02.
- SUU – Joshua Dye 15-yard run (Jayden Rogers kick), 7:37. Tied 7–7. Drive: 10 plays, 75 yards, 4:21.

Second quarter

- SUU – Braedon Wissler 1-yard run (Jayden Rogers kick), 7:23. Thunderbirds 14–7. Drive: 17 plays, 77 yards, 8:22.
- NAU – Seth Cromwell 1-yard run (Samuel Hunsaker kick), 4:31. Tied 14–14. Drive: 7 plays, 75 yards, 2:52.

Third quarter

- NAU – Ty Pennington 4-yard run (Samuel Hunsaker kick), 12:56. Lumberjacks 21–14. Drive: 4 plays, 52 yards, 2:04.
- NAU – Jeter Purdy 22-yard pass from Ty Pennington (Samuel Hunsaker kick), 9:44. Lumberjacks 28–14. Drive: 4 plays, 30 yards, 1:26.
- SUU – Joshua Dye 1-yard run (Jayden Rogers kick), 5:56. Lumberjacks 28–21. Drive: 8 plays, 40 yards, 3:35.
- NAU – Kolbe Katsis 88-yard pass from Ty Pennington (Samuel Hunsaker kick), 5:41. Lumberjacks 35–21. Drive: 1 play, 88 yards, 0:12.
- SUU – Ran Sawyer 95-yard kickoff return (Jayden Rogers kick), 5:27. Lumberjacks 35–28.
- NAU – Quran Gossett 3-yard run (Samuel Hunsaker kick), 0:27. Lumberjacks 42–28. Drive: 9 plays, 75 yards, 5:00.

Fourth quarter

- SUU – Joshua Dye 59-yard run (Jayden Rogers kick), 13:27. Lumberjacks 42–35. Drive: 6 plays, 69 yards, 1:56.
- SUU – Shane Carr 42-yard pass from Bronson Barron (Jayden Rogers kick), 9:16. Tied 42–42. Drive: 4 plays, 65 yards, 1:42.
- SUU – Joshua Dye 4-yard run (Jayden Rogers kick), 4:31. Thunderbirds 49–42. Drive: 5 plays, 73 yards, 2:16.
- NAU – Seth Cromwell 5-yard run (Ty Pennington–Jayson Raines pass), 0:29. Lumberjacks 50–49. Drive: 13 plays, 79 yards, 3:56.
- NAU – Team safety, 0:13. Lumberjacks 52–49.

Statistics	NAU	SUU
First downs	23	26
Plays–yards	69–508	73–447
Rushes–yards	38–142	39–178
Passing yards	366	269
Passing: Comp–Att–Int	20–31–0	22–34–0
Turnovers	1	0
Time of possession	26:33	31:23

Team	Category	Player	Statistics
Northern Arizona	Passing	Ty Pennington	20/31, 366 yards, 3 TD
Northern Arizona	Rushing	Seth Cromwell	12 carries, 87 yards, 2 TD
Northern Arizona	Receiving	Kolbe Katsis	6 receptions, 135 yards, 2 TD
Southern Utah	Passing	Bronson Barron	22/33, 269 yards, TD
Southern Utah	Rushing	Joshua Dye	25 carries, 171 yards, 4 TD
Southern Utah	Receiving	Shane Carr	3 receptions, 89 yards, TD

=== at No. 9 UC Davis ===
Southern Utah Thunderbirds (1–2) at No. 9 UC Davis Aggies (1–1) – Game summary

Quarter	1	2	3	4	Total
Thunderbirds	7	13	7	7	34
No. 9 Aggies	14	8	21	7	50

at UC Davis Health Stadium • Davis, CA

- Date: September 20
- Game time: 8:00 p.m. MDT
- Game weather: Sunny • Temperature: 82 °F (28 °C)
- Game attendance: 17,217
- Referee: Jeff Rink
- TV announcers (ESPN+): Scott Marsh (play-by-play) and Scott Gordon (analyst)

Game information

First quarter

- (10:53) UCD – Zach Jones 11-yard run, Hunter Ridley kick (Drive: 7 plays, 84 yards, 2:36; UC Davis 7–0)
- (7:39) UCD – Winston Williams 10-yard pass from Caden Pinnick, Hunter Ridley kick (Drive: 4 plays, 68 yards, 1:25; UC Davis 14–0)
- (2:02) SUU – Gabe Nunez 28-yard pass from Bronson Barron, Jayden Rogers kick (Drive: 2 plays, 52 yards, 0:46; UC Davis 14–7)

Second quarter

- (7:01) SUU – Braedon Wissler 15-yard pass from Bronson Barron, Jayden Rogers kick (Drive: 16 plays, 80 yards, 8:02; Tied 14–14)
- (5:57) UCD – Jordan Fisher 6-yard run, Dylan Mauro rush (Drive: 2 plays, 63 yards, 0:55; UC Davis 22–14)
- (1:15) SUU – Joshua Dye 8-yard run (Drive: 10 plays, 80 yards, 4:34; UC Davis 22–20)

Third quarter

- (14:48) UCD – Jordan Fisher 75-yard run, Hunter Ridley kick (Drive: 1 play, 75 yards, 0:12; UC Davis 29–20)
- (11:10) SUU – Will Burns 1-yard run, Jayden Rogers kick (Drive: 7 plays, 66 yards, 3:31; UC Davis 29–27)
- (7:55) UCD – Mitchell Dixon 8-yard pass from Caden Pinnick, Hunter Ridley kick (Drive: 1 play, 8 yards, 0:08; UC Davis 36–27)
- (0:55) UCD – Carter Vargas 23-yard run, Hunter Ridley kick (Drive: 8 plays, 83 yards, 3:33; UC Davis 43–27)

Fourth quarter

- (9:29) UCD – Carter Vargas 47-yard run, Hunter Ridley kick (Drive: 6 plays, 78 yards, 3:46; UC Davis 50–27)
- (1:15) SUU – Braedon Wissler 1-yard run, Jayden Rogers kick (Drive: 14 plays, 93 yards, 3:32; UC Davis 50–34)

Statistics	SUU	UCD
First downs	28	18
Plays–yards	86–549	48–519
Rushes–yards	43–233	27–357
Passing yards	316	162
Passing: Comp–Att–Int	23–43–1	13–21–0
Turnovers	2	0
Time of possession	36:59	23:01

Team	Category	Player	Statistics
Southern Utah	Passing	Bronson Barron	23/43, 316 yards, 2 TD, INT
Southern Utah	Rushing	Joshua Dye	20 carries, 155 yards, TD
Southern Utah	Receiving	Gabe Nunez	8 receptions, 106 yards, TD
UC Davis	Passing	Caden Pinnick	13/21, 162 yards, 2 TD
UC Davis	Rushing	Jordan Fisher	12 carries, 170 yards, 2 TD
UC Davis	Receiving	Samuel Gbatu Jr.	3 receptions, 45 yards

=== No. 18 West Georgia ===
No. 18 West Georgia Wolves (4-0) vs. Southern Utah Thunderbirds (1-3) – Game summary

Quarter	1	2	3	4	Total
No. 18 Wolves	3	14	7	3	27
Thunderbirds	3	0	14	7	24

at Eccles Coliseum • Cedar City, UT

- Date: September 27
- Game time: 6:30 p.m. MDT
- TV announcers (ESPN+): Spencer McLaughlin (play-by-play) and Dallin Richards (analyst)

Statistics	UWG	SUU
First downs	23	18
Total yards	348	295
Rushing yards	206	89
Passing yards	142	206
Passing: Comp–Att–Int	14–26–0	17–28–1
Time of possession	31:48	28:12

Team	Category	Player	Statistics
West Georgia	Passing	Davin Wydner	14/26, 142 yards, TD
West Georgia	Rushing	Latrelle Murrell	21 carries, 80 yards
West Georgia	Receiving	Jordan Dees	5 receptions, 69 yards
Southern Utah	Passing	Bronson Barron	15/26, 186 yards, TD, INT
Southern Utah	Rushing	Joshua Dye	16 carries, 56 yards, 2 TD
Southern Utah	Receiving	Mark Bails	4 receptions, 93 yards, TD

=== at No. 3 Tarleton State ===
Southern Utah Thunderbirds (1-4) vs. No. 3 Tarleton State Texans (5-0) – Game summary

Quarter	1	2	3	4	Total
Thunderbirds	14	21	7	0	42
No. 3 Texans	14	14	17	7	52

at Memorial Stadium • Stephenville, TX

- Date: October 4
- Game time: 5:00 p.m. MDT
- TV announcers (ESPN+): Kyle Youmans (play-by-play), Hek'ma Harrison (analyst) and Kendra Sheehan (sideline)

Statistics	SUU	TAR
First downs		
Total yards		
Rushing yards		
Passing yards		
Passing: Comp–Att–Int		
Time of possession		

Team	Category	Player	Statistics
Southern Utah	Passing		
Southern Utah	Rushing		
Southern Utah	Receiving		
Tarleton State	Passing		
Tarleton State	Rushing		
Tarleton State	Receiving		

=== No. 13 Abilene Christian ===
No. 13 Abilene Christian Wildcats (4-3) vs. Southern Utah Thunderbirds (1-5) – Game summary

Quarter	1	2	3	4	Total
No. 13 Wildcats	-	-	-	-	0
Thunderbirds	-	-	-	-	0

at Eccles Coliseum • Cedar City, UT

- Date: October 18

Statistics	ACU	SUU
First downs		
Total yards		
Rushing yards		
Passing yards		
Passing: Comp–Att–Int		
Time of possession		

Team	Category	Player	Statistics
Abilene Christian	Passing		
Abilene Christian	Rushing		
Abilene Christian	Receiving		
Southern Utah	Passing		
Southern Utah	Rushing		
Southern Utah	Receiving		

=== at Utah Tech ===
Southern Utah Thunderbirds (2-5) vs. Utah Tech Trailblazers (1-5) – Game summary

Quarter	1	2	3	4	Total
Thunderbirds	-	-	-	-	0
Trailblazers	-	-	-	-	0

at Greater Zion Stadium • St. George, UT

- Date: October 25

Statistics	SUU	UTU
First downs		
Total yards		
Rushing yards		
Passing yards		
Passing: Comp–Att–Int		
Time of possession		

Team	Category	Player	Statistics
Southern Utah	Passing		
Southern Utah	Rushing		
Southern Utah	Receiving		
Utah Tech	Passing		
Utah Tech	Rushing		
Utah Tech	Receiving		

=== No. 22 Austin Peay ===
No. 22 Austin Peay Governors (5-3) vs. Southern Utah Thunderbirds (3-5) – Game summary

Quarter	1	2	3	4	Total
No. 22 Governors	-	-	-	-	0
Thunderbirds	-	-	-	-	0

at Eccles Coliseum • Cedar City, UT

- Date: November 1

Statistics	APSU	SUU
First downs		
Total yards		
Rushing yards		
Passing yards		
Passing: Comp–Att–Int		
Time of possession		

Team	Category	Player	Statistics
Austin Peay	Passing		
Austin Peay	Rushing		
Austin Peay	Receiving		
Southern Utah	Passing		
Southern Utah	Rushing		
Southern Utah	Receiving		

=== at Eastern Kentucky ===
Southern Utah Thunderbirds (4-5) vs. Eastern Kentucky Colonels (4-5) – Game summary

Quarter	1	2	3	4	Total
Thunderbirds	-	-	-	-	0
Colonels	-	-	-	-	0

at Roy Kidd Stadium • Richmond, KY

- Date: November 8

Statistics	SUU	EKU
First downs		
Total yards		
Rushing yards		
Passing yards		
Passing: Comp–Att–Int		
Time of possession		

Team	Category	Player	Statistics
Southern Utah	Passing		
Southern Utah	Rushing		
Southern Utah	Receiving		
Eastern Kentucky	Passing		
Eastern Kentucky	Rushing		
Eastern Kentucky	Receiving		

=== Central Arkansas ===
Central Arkansas Bears (0-0) vs. Southern Utah Thunderbirds (0-0) – Game summary

Quarter	1	2	3	4	Total
Bears	-	-	-	-	0
Thunderbirds	-	-	-	-	0

at Eccles Coliseum • Cedar City, UT

- Date: November 15

Statistics	CARK	SUU
First downs		
Total yards		
Rushing yards		
Passing yards		
Passing: Comp–Att–Int		
Time of possession		

Team	Category	Player	Statistics
Central Arkansas	Passing		
Central Arkansas	Rushing		
Central Arkansas	Receiving		
Southern Utah	Passing		
Southern Utah	Rushing		
Southern Utah	Receiving		

=== at North Alabama ===
Southern Utah Thunderbirds (0-0) vs. North Alabama Lions (0-0) – Game summary

Quarter	1	2	3	4	Total
Thunderbirds	-	-	-	-	0
Lions	-	-	-	-	0

at Braly Municipal Stadium • Florence, AL

- Date: November 22

Statistics	SUU	UNA
First downs		
Total yards		
Rushing yards		
Passing yards		
Passing: Comp–Att–Int		
Time of possession		

Team	Category	Player	Statistics
Southern Utah	Passing		
Southern Utah	Rushing		
Southern Utah	Receiving		
North Alabama	Passing		
North Alabama	Rushing		
North Alabama	Receiving		

== Ranking movements ==
Ranking movements Legend: ██ Increase in ranking ██ Decrease in ranking — = Not ranked RV = Received votes
	Week														
Poll	Pre	1	2	3	4	5	6	7	8	9	10	11	12	13	Final
STATS FCS	RV	24	RV	—	—	—									
Coaches	RV	RV	—	—	—	—									
