= Lance Anderson (American football) =

American football coach and player (born 1971)

Current position
- Title: Head coach
- Team: Utah Tech
- Conference: UAC
- Record: 3–21

Biographical details
- Born: February 5, 1971 (age 55); Rupert, Idaho, U.S.

Playing career
- 1993–1994: Idaho State
- Position: Linebacker

Coaching career (HC unless noted)
- 1997: Idaho State (RB)
- 1998: Idaho State (TE/OT)
- 1999: Mobile Admirals (RB)
- 1999: Bucknell (TE/OT)
- 2000–2002: Bucknell (DL/RC)
- 2003: Saint Mary's (co-DC/DL)
- 2004: Utah State (OLB)
- 2005–2006: San Diego (DL/RC)
- 2007–2009: Stanford (DT/RC)
- 2010–2013: Stanford (OLB/RC)
- 2014–2017: Stanford (DC/OLB)
- 2018–2022: Stanford (AHC/DC/OLB)
- 2023: Boise State (senior analyst)
- 2024–present: Utah Tech

Head coaching record
- Overall: 3–21

Lance Anderson (born February 5, 1971) is an American college football coach and former player. He is the head football coach at Utah Tech University, a position he had held since the 2024 season.

== Playing career ==
Anderson played linebacker for Idaho State from 1993 through 1994. He walked on to the program after serving a church mission following high school.

== Coaching career ==
=== Idaho State ===
Following his graduation in 1996, Anderson joined the coaching staff at his alma mater. In his first season, 1997, he coached the Idaho State running backs, before serving as the tight ends coach and assistant offensive line coach.

=== Mobile Admirals ===
In the summer of 1999, Anderson coached the running backs for the Mobile Admirals in the lone season of the Regional Football League. That season, the Admirals were 6–2 and won the league championship, the RFL Bowl I.

=== Bucknell ===
That fall, Anderson joined the Bucknell football staff as the tight ends and assistant offensive line coach. In 2001, Anderson moved to the defensive side of the ball, coaching the defensive line for two years. He also served as the programs recruiting coordinator during this time.

=== Saint Mary's ===
Anderson joined the Saint Mary's coaching staff in 2003 as the co-defensive coordinator and defensive line coach. This was the final season the school had a football team.

=== Utah State ===
In 2004, Anderson reunited with former Bucknell defensive coordinator Dave Kotulski when he joined him at Utah State as the outside linebackers coach. Anderson's father wrestled and played football at Utah State.

=== San Diego ===
For the 2005 and 2006 seasons, Anderson was the defensive line coach and recruiting coordinator for Jim Harbaugh at San Diego.

=== Stanford ===
In 2007, Anderson followed Harbaugh to Stanford, where he coached the defensive tackles and served as the recruiting coordinator through 2009. From 2010 to 2013, he continued as the recruiting coordinators, but coached the outside linebackers. Prior to the 2014 season, Anderson was promoted to defensive coordinator after Derek Mason left to become the head coach at Vanderbilt. The official title for the position is the Willie Shaw Director of Defense. Anderson continued coaching the outside linebackers. Prior to the 2018 season, Anderson was promoted to associate head coach.

=== Boise State ===
Following a coaching change at Stanford following the 2022 season, Anderson joined Andy Avalos' staff at Boise State as a senior defensive analyst.

=== Utah Tech ===
In early December 2023, it was announced that Anderson would become a first time head coach for Utah Tech ahead of the 2024 season.

== Personal life ==
Lance and his wife, Sherri, reside in Menlo Park with their three children, Aubrey, Jaren and Braden. He was a three-sport athlete at Idaho's Minico High School, participating in football, baseball and track. He earned his degree from Idaho State University with a degree in biology.

== Head coaching record ==
Year	Team	Overall	Conference	Standing	Bowl/playoffs
Utah Tech Trailblazers (United Athletic Conference) (2024–present)
2024	Utah Tech	1–11	1–7	T–8th	
2025	Utah Tech	2–10	1–7	T–8th	
Utah Tech:		3–21	2–14		
Total:		3–21			
