= Braly Municipal Stadium =

Stadium in Florence, Alabama

- Municipal Stadium
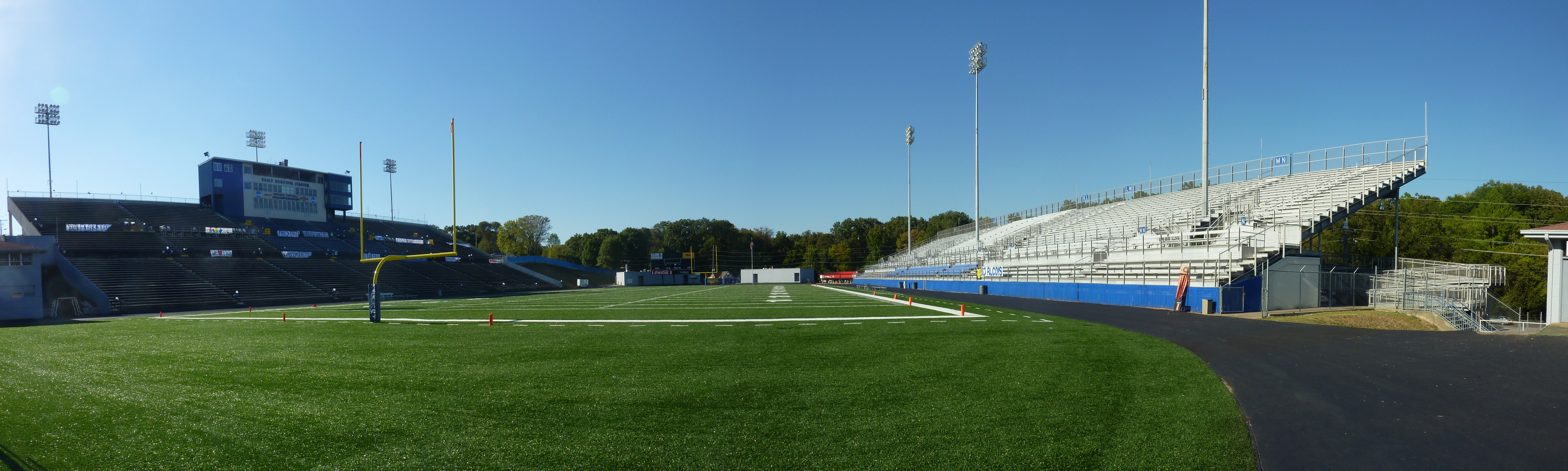
- View of the stadium in 2010
- Interactive map of Braly Municipal Stadium
- Full name: Tom Braly Municipal Stadium
- Former names: Coffee Stadium (1942–1963)
- Address: 521 N Royal Ave. Florence, Alabama; United States
- Coordinates: 34°48′36″N 87°40′22″W
- Owner: Florence High School
- Operator: Florence High School
- Capacity: 14,215
- Type: Stadium
- Surface: ProGrass
- Record attendance: 15,631 (Football; North Alabama Lions vs. IUP Crimson Hawks; December 11, 1993)
- Current use: Football

Construction
- Groundbreaking: 1941
- Opened: 1942; 84 years ago

Tenants
- North Alabama Lions (NCAA) football (1949–2025); Florence High School Falcons (2004-present); NCAA Div. II championship (1986–2013)

Website
- roarlions.com/BralyStadium

Tom Braly Municipal Stadium is a 14,215-seat stadium in Florence, Alabama. It is primarily used for American football, and is the home field of the Florence High School Falcons. From 1949 to 2025, it was the home of the North Alabama Lions. It also hosted the NCAA Division II Football Championship games from 1986 to 2013, which were broadcast on ESPN.

UNA holds a 281–135–8 record at Braly Stadium. It has also hosted 30 of UNA's 47 Division II Playoff games.

== History ==
On September 26, 1940, J.W. Powell, Florence Schools superintendent, announced that the WPA had approved a project to build a new football stadium in Florence. The stadium, along with other athletic facilities such as a baseball diamond, would be built on a section of a 25-acre lot owned by the Board of Education between Cherry Street, Jackson Highway, and Royal Avenue.

The project was given a cost of $80,125, a majority of which would come from the WPA. Local architects Ben F. Riley, III and Howard Griffith designed the plans for the stadium and surrounding area. The stadium was designed to seat 5,000 and employ up to 60 people.

It was originally slated to be finished in time for the Coffee High Yellow Jackets to play their 1941 season at the venue. But, despite attempts to speed up construction, the stadium was not ready and would not host its first football game until 1942. The first game saw the Coffee High Yellow Jackets defeat Guin High School 57-0 with second-year head coach, Tom Braly Jr.

In early 2025, renovations to Braly Stadium were announced and began. Florence City Schools Board of Education approved a 8.5 million dollar project to build brand new locker rooms on the south endzone. The locker rooms will be connected to a weight room for the middle school and a brand new entrance to the stadium.

On November 22, 2025, the North Alabama Lions played their 424th and last game at the stadium versus the Southern Utah Thunderbirds, in a 36-34 overtime loss. The Lions moved into Bank Independent Stadium on September 19, 2026.

== Name ==
The stadium is a block east of the university campus and adjacent to the Florence Middle School. The middle school was formerly Coffee High School, but was transformed in 2004 when Florence's two public high schools merged. Braly is named for Thomas Braly, Jr., a Coffee High School coach who was principal of the school from 1945 until his death in 1963.

== Facilities ==
Seating capacity has increased by 6,200 seats since 1980 (5,000 in 1980 and 1,200 in 1998). The original playing surface featured a sand foundation that enabled the field to withstand six inches (152 mm) of rain at one time without altering the footing; however, that surface was replaced with ProGrass synthetic turf during the summer of 2010.

Other renovations include a $175,000 scoreboard with a message center installed in 1995 and a 1998 renovation that doubled the working press area as well as provided additional restrooms and viewing booths for game administration. The 1995 scoreboard was replaced in 2010 with a $57,000 LED based scoreboard along with a new elevator to the press box and a resealing of the running track around the field.

The new three-level press box consists of a first level that seats up to 50 sportswriters. The second level has areas for coaching staffs from competing schools, the public address announcer, the clock operator, the stadium manager, and also provides space for radio crews from both home and visiting teams. The third floor is used by television and film crews.
