= University Stadium (West Georgia) =

On-campus stadium in Carrollton, Georgia

Coordinates: 33.579767°N 85.123615°W

RAN-LIN Field at University Stadium
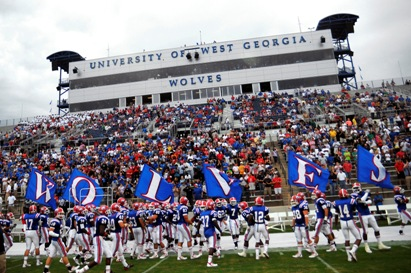
- Home side of RA-LIN Field at University Stadium.
- Interactive map of RAN-LIN Field at University Stadium
- Location: Carrollton, Georgia
- Owner: University of West Georgia
- Operator: University of West Georgia
- Capacity: 10,000
- Surface: Grass

Construction
- Opened: 2009
- Cost: $29 Million

Tenant
- West Georgia Wolves (NCAA FCS)

University Stadium is an on-campus stadium in Carrollton, Georgia that opened in 2009. It is primarily used for American football and is the home field of the University of West Georgia Wolves. The stadium holds 10,000 people.

== Construction ==
In 2003, the University of West Georgia acquired 250 acres from the city of Carrollton for the purpose of creating a stadium and athletic complex. Such a facility would serve a dual role: give UWG sports teams a facility that they could use and aid the university in its quest to continue to attract additional students. The funding for this venture was made possible through private donations and increased student fees approved by the Student Government Association.

During the summer of 2008, construction began on this facility, and, in the fall of 2009, University Stadium opened. The stadium seats roughly 9,000, providing ample space for any sporting or other entertainment event. Additionally, the new athletic complex includes a stadium and practice field for the Wolves’ soccer program, a new softball stadium, and a women’s field house with locker-room facilities for both women’s sports.
