= 2023 Southern Utah Thunderbirds football team =

American college football season

2023 Southern Utah Thunderbirds football
- Conference: United Athletic Conference
- Record: 6–5 (4–2 UAC)
- Head coach: DeLane Fitzgerald (2nd season)
- Offensive coordinator: Tye Hiatt (1st season)
- Defensive coordinator: John Kelling (2nd season)
- Home stadium: Eccles Coliseum

2023 United Athletic Conference standings
	Conf.			Overall
Team	W		L	W		L
No. 18 Austin Peay $^	6	–	0	9	–	3
Central Arkansas	4	–	2	7	–	4
Southern Utah	4	–	2	6	–	5
Eastern Kentucky	4	–	2	5	–	6
Tarleton State*	4	–	2	8	–	3
Abilene Christian	3	–	3	5	–	6
North Alabama	1	–	5	3	–	8
Utah Tech*	1	–	5	2	–	9
Stephen F. Austin	0	–	6	3	–	8
$ – Conference champion; Note: Tarleton State and Utah Tech are ineligible for the UAC title and FCS postseason play due to transitions from NCAA Division II.; Rankings from STATS Poll

The 2023 Southern Utah Thunderbirds football team represented Southern Utah University in the United Athletic Conference (UAC) during the 2023 NCAA Division I FCS football season. Led by second-year head coach DeLane Fitzgerald, the Thunderbirds played their games at Eccles Coliseum in Cedar City, Utah.

After the 2022 season, the WAC and the ASUN Conference, which had partnered in a football-only alliance in the 2021 and 2022 seasons, fully merged their football leagues, creating what eventually became the United Athletic Conference.

== Schedule ==
Date	Time	Opponent	Site	TV	Result	Attendance
August 31	8:00 p.m.	at Arizona State*	Mountain America Stadium; Tempe, AZ	P12N	L 21–24	47,773
September 9	1:00 p.m.	at BYU*	LaVell Edwards Stadium; Provo, UT	ESPN+	L 16–41	60,834
September 16	8:00 p.m.	at No. 16 UC Davis*	UC Davis Health Stadium; Davis, CA	ESPN+	L 21–23	7,942
September 23	6:00 p.m.	Western Illinois*	Eccles Coliseum; Cedar City, UT	ESPN+	W 37–17	6,504
September 30	6:00 p.m.	No. 25 Central Arkansas	Eccles Coliseum; Cedar City, UT	ESPN+	L 27–29	4,013
October 7	5:00 p.m.	Tarleton State	Memorial Stadium; Stephenville, TX	ESPN+	W 27–26	10,835
October 21	6:00 p.m.	No. 24 Austin Peay	Eccles Coliseum; Cedar City, UT	ESPN+	L 45–48 ^{2OT}	3,547
October 28	1:00 p.m.	Abilene Christian	Eccles Coliseum; Cedar City, UT	ESPN+	W 52–14	2,969
November 4	1:00 p.m.	Lincoln (CA)*	Eccles Coliseum; Cedar City, UT	ESPN+	W 35–6	3,023
November 11	3:00 p.m.	at Stephen F. Austin	Homer Bryce Stadium; Nacogdoches, TX	ESPN+	W 45–17	6,835
November 18	7:00 p.m.	at Utah Tech	Greater Zion Stadium; St. George, UT	ESPN+	W 24–16	6,077
*Non-conference game; Rankings from STATS Poll released prior to the game; All times are in Mountain time

== Game summaries ==
=== at Arizona State ===
Southern Utah Thunderbirds (0–0) vs Arizona State Sun Devils (0–0) – Game summary

Quarter	1	2	3	4	Total
Thunderbirds	0	7	7	7	21
Sun Devils	7	14	0	3	24

at Mountain America Stadium • Tempe, AZ

- Date: August 31, 2023
- Game time: 7:00 p.m.
- Game weather: Cloudy, 102 °F (39 °C)
- Game attendance: 47,773
- Referee: Cravonne Barrett
- TV announcers (Pac-12 Network): Roxy Bernstein (play-by-play), Lincoln Kennedy (analyst)

Game information

First quarter

- (9:00) ASU – Cameron Skattebo 6-yard run, Dario Longhetto kick (Drive: 5 plays, 68 yards, 1:59; Arizona State 7–0)

Second quarter

- (11:05) SUU – Targhee Lambson 1-yard run, Tyler Graham kick (Drive: 11 plays, 62 yards, 6:43; Tied 7–7)
- (5:32) ASU – Xavier Guillory 47-yard pass from Jaden Rashada, Dario Longhetto kick (Drive: 7 plays, 77 yards, 2:37; Arizona State 14–7)
- (0:02) ASU – Troy Omeire 3-yard pass from Jaden Rashada, Dario Longhetto kick (Drive: 8 plays, 75 yards, 2:54; Arizona State 21–7)

Third quarter

- (0:49) SUU – Zack Mitchell 17-yard pass from Justin Miller, Tyler Graham kick (Drive: 5 plays, 70 yards, 3:39; Arizona State 21–14)

Fourth quarter

- (13:41) ASU – Dario Longhetto 38-yard field goal (Drive: 4 plays, -14 yards, 1:49; Arizona State 24–14)
- (7:50) SUU – George Ramirez 47-yard blocked punt return, Tyler Graham kick (Drive: 9 plays, 27 yards, 4:40; Arizona State 24–21)

Statistics	SUU	ASU
First downs	11	19
Total yards	226	371
Rushes/yards	87	135
Passing yards	139	236
Passing: Comp–Att–Int	9–18–0	18–31–0
Time of possession	30:48	29:12

Team	Category	Player	Statistics
Southern Utah	Passing	Justin Miller	8/17, 123 yards, TD
Southern Utah	Rushing	Braedon Wissler	15 carries, 45 yards
Southern Utah	Receiving	Zach Mitchell	4 receptions, 52 yards, TD
Arizona State	Passing	Jaden Rashada	18/31, 236 yards, 2 TD
Arizona State	Rushing	Cameron Skattebo	17 carries, 75 yards, TD
Arizona State	Receiving	Xavier Guillory	5 receptions, 73 yards, TD

=== at BYU ===
Southern Utah at BYU

Team	1	2	3	4	Total
Thunderbirds	3	0	7	6	16
• Cougars	6	21	7	7	41

- Date: September 9
- Location: LaVell Edwards Stadium
  Provo, UT
- Game start: 1:02 p.m. MDT
- Elapsed time: 3:12
- Game attendance: 60,834
- Game weather: 82 °F (28 °C), Winds NE 3 mph
- Referee: Tutashinda Salaam
- TV announcers (ESPN+): Matt Schumacker, Brad Hopkins, and Shane Sparks

Scoring summary

Quarter	Time	Drive			Team	Scoring information	Score	
Quarter	Time	Plays	Yards	TOP	Team	Scoring information	SUU	BYU
1	7:17	9	52	4:06	SUU	29-yard field goal by Tyler Graham	3	0
1	1:03	9	85	4:23	BYU	Isaac Rex 20-yard touchdown reception from Kedon Slovis, Will Ferrin kick no good	3	6
2	12:36	5	36	2:12	BYU	Keanu Hill 8-yard touchdown reception from Kedon Slovis, Will Ferrin kick good	3	13
2	5:47	8	78	4:22	BYU	Darius Lassiter 8-yard touchdown reception from Kedon Slovis, Will Ferrin kick good	3	20
2	00:30	4	70	0:30	BYU	Deion Smith 2-yard touchdown run, Will Ferrin kick good	3	27
3	11:00	7	75	4:00	SUU	Isaiah Wooden 33-yard touchdown reception from Justin Miller, Tyler Graham kick good	10	27
3	0:36	7	72	3:25	BYU	Kedon Slovis 6-yard touchdown run, Will Ferrin kick good	10	34
4	9:39	1	39	0:09	BYU	Chase Roberts 39-yard touchdown reception from Kedon Slovis, Will Ferrin kick good	10	41
4	5:15	8	75	4:24	SUU	Targhee Lambson 2-yard touchdown run, Tyler Graham kick no good	16	41
"TOP" = time of possession. For other American football terms, see Glossary of American football.							16	41

Statistics	SUU	BYU
First downs	16	18
Plays–yards	60–346	55–394
Rushes–yards	27–84, 1 TD	23–46, 2 TD's
Passing yards	262	348
Passing: comp–att–int	17–33–1, 1 TD	22–32–1, 4 TD's
Time of possession	31:19	28:41

Team	Category	Player	Statistics
SUU	Passing	Justin Miller	16–30–1, 235 yards, 1 TD
SUU	Rushing	Targhee Lambson	7 carries, 32 yards, 1 TD
SUU	Receiving	Zach Mitchell	7 receptions, 135 yards
BYU	Passing	Kedon Slovis	22–32–1, 348 yards, 4 TD's
BYU	Rushing	LJ Martin	6 carries, 27 yards
BYU	Receiving	Isaac Rex	4 receptions, 112 yards, 1 TD
