= DeLane Fitzgerald =

American football player and coach (born 1976)

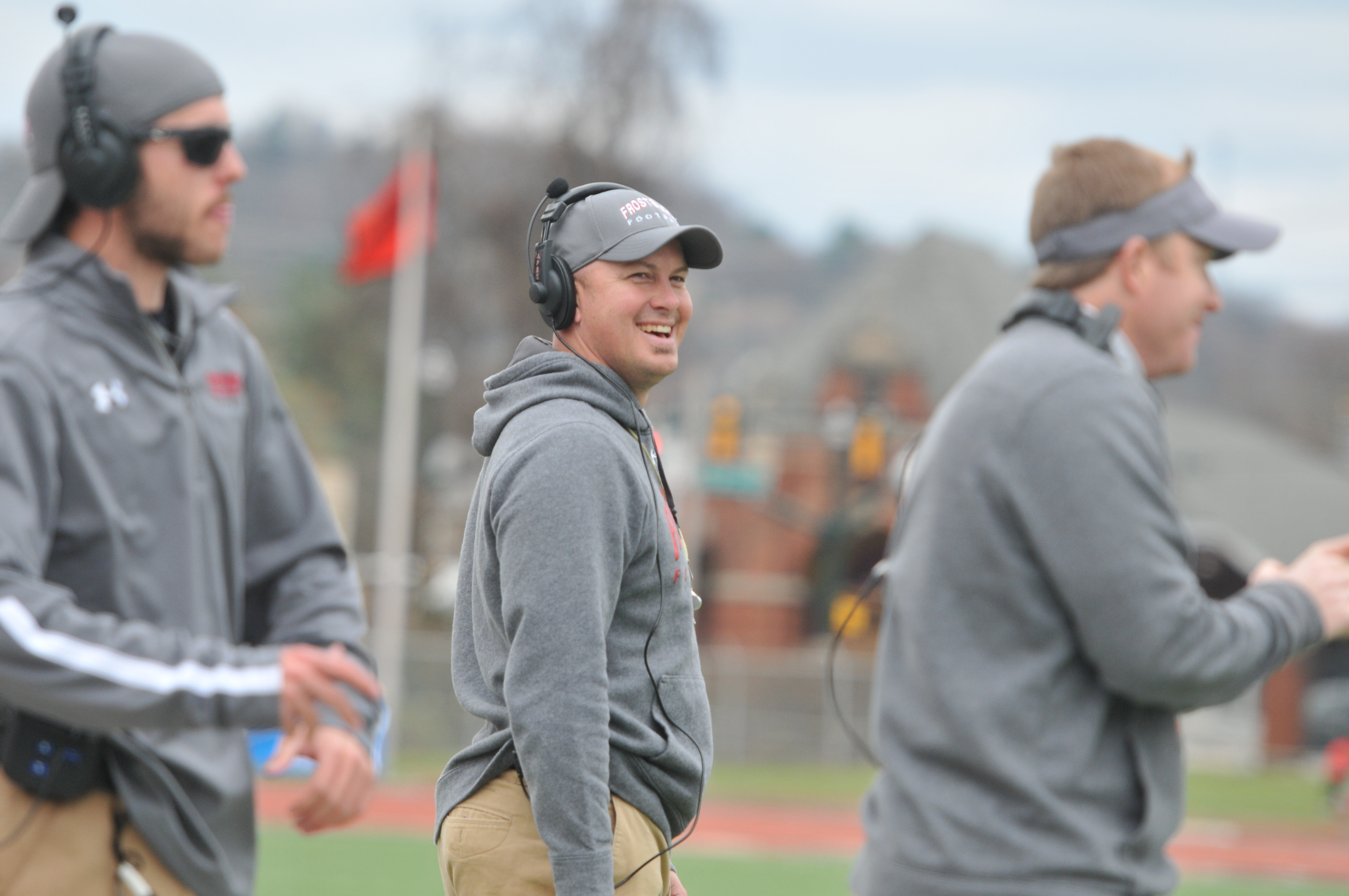

Current position
- Title: Head coach
- Team: Southern Utah
- Conference: UAC
- Record: 25–21

Biographical details
- Born: September 21, 1976 (age 50); Lovingston, Virginia, U.S.

Playing career
- 1995–1996: Potomac State
- 1997–1999: James Madison
- Position: Fullback

Coaching career (HC unless noted)
- 2000–2001: Bridgton Academy (ME) (DC)
- 2002: James Madison (DL)
- 2003–2004: Tennessee–Martin (ST/RB)
- 2005: Bethel (TN) (OC)
- 2006–2008: Southern Virginia (OC/OL)
- 2009–2013: Southern Virginia
- 2014–2021: Frostburg State
- 2022–present: Southern Utah

Head coaching record
- Overall: 111–70
- Bowls: 1–0
- Tournaments: 3–2 (NCAA D-III playoffs)

Accomplishments and honors

Championships
- 2 NJAC (2016, 2018); 1 MEC (2021)

Awards
- Conference Coach of the Year: 2016, 2018, 2021

DeLane Fitzgerald (born September 21, 1976) is an American football coach and former player. He is the head football coach at Southern Utah University, a position he has held since 2022. Fitzgerald served as the head football coach at Frostburg State University from 2014 to 2021 and at Southern Virginia University from 2009 to 2013. He played college football at James Madison University from 1997 to 1999.

== Early life, playing career, and education ==
Fitzgerald was born in Lovingston, Virginia. His collegiate football playing career began at Potomac State College from 1995 to 1996. As a sophomore, he was named team captain and was a Lough Award as well as a Student-Athlete Award winner. After his Sophomore season, Fitzgerald transferred to James Madison University for the 1997 through 1999 seasons. He helped lead James Madison to an 8–4 record in 1999 landing the Dukes a spot in the NCAA playoffs and a share of the Atlantic 10 Conference championship. He was twice selected to the Academic All-Atlantic 10 team.

Fitzgerald received his bachelor's degree in kinesiology from James Madison in 1999, he received his master's degree in education from Bethel University in McKenzie, Tennessee in 2012.

== Coaching career ==
After spending one season on the staff at his alma mater, James Madison, as an assistant coach Fitzgerald worked for two seasons at the University of Tennessee at Martin as a running backs coach and special teams coordinator. He then moved to Bethel University in McKenzie, Tennessee as offensive coordinator in 2005, helping the Knights to win a Mid-South Conference Western Division championship and set school marks in rushing, passing efficiency, and total offense.

Fitzgerald then spent three seasons as an assistant coach at Southern Virginia University in Buena Vista, Virginia before being promoted to head coach. He served as head coach for five seasons, from 2009 to 2013. In 2013, Fitzgerald led the Knights to an 8–2 record, the best record in Southern Virginia football history. Fitzgerald was also named Southern Virginia University Coach of the Year in 2013. On his staff, he had Tyler Card, offensive line coach and recruiting coordinator, who is now head coach at Greensboro College.

Frostburg State athletic director, Troy A. Dell announced that Fitzgerald had been selected as the school's head football coach following a national search in January 2014. Fitzgerald was the 13th head coach in the 54-year history of the Bobcats football program. In his first season at Frostburg State, the Bobcats posted a record of 4–6, the best record the program had earned in over five years. The Bobcats improved on both offense and defense as well as special teams leading the Empire 8 conference in fewest turnovers (12) and blocked kicks (6). In his second season at Frostburg State, Fitzgerald's Bobcats improved to a 6–4 record, including a five-game winning streak.

In his third season, in 2016, Fitzgerald's Bobcats went 10–1. After starting 1–1, the Bobcats finished the year on a nine-game winning streak. Although Fitzgerald is known for his offense, Frostburg State boasted one of the top defensive units in NCAA Division III football. The Bobcats were fourth in team passing efficiency defense (87.94), fourth in team tackles for loss (10.1), fourth in passing yards allowed (130.3), and 11th in scoring defense (12.8). This was just the second time in the 56-years history of the program that the team had a 10-win season. Frostburg earned a share of the New Jersey Athletic Conference football championship with the Wesley Wolverines. Frostburg won the 18th Annual Regents Cup Game against the NJAC rival, Salisbury on November 12. The Bobcats beat the 22nd-ranked St. John Fisher Cardinals in the ECAC Asa S. Bushnell Bowl game in Philadelphia on November 19. Fitzgerald was selected as the 2016 NJAC Coach of the Year by his peers.

Over the last three seasons, Frostburg had been one of the most impressive teams in NCAA Division III. Last fall the Bobcats finished 39th in the country in total offense (435.9), while in 2016, the Bobcats defense was 9th in total defense as limited opponents to just 240.6 yards per game. In 2018, Frostburg was second in the country with five blocked punts. The Bobcats were ranked near the top of the NCAA statistics in blocked kicks every year he was at the helm.

In 2017, the Bobcats captured a program-record 11 wins (11–2) that included NCAA playoff victories over No. 9 Wittenberg (35–7) and No. 10 Washington & Jefferson (46–23). The Bobcats captured second place in the NJAC standings (8–1), scored a school-record 468 points, and tied a school record with 13-straight wins that started in the 2016 season. The season marked Frostburg's first trip to the NCAA Playoffs since 1993 and the first appearance in the quarterfinals since the playoffs expanded to 32 teams.

In 2018, the Bobcats hosted a pair of NCAA Playoffs games for the first time in program history, finished the season ranked eighth in the AFCA poll, posted the first undefeated regular season in program history (9–0), and won the NJAC Title for the second time in three seasons. Frostburg opened the playoffs with a dominating 42–24 win over Western New England at Bobcat Stadium. The Bobcats posted one of the best three-year runs in NCAA Division III football as they won 31 games during that span, with two trips to the NCAA Playoffs in 2017 and 2018 and an ECAC Bowl Game victory following the 2016 season. Frostburg spent the entire 2017 and 2018 seasons ranked inside the top-25 polls, while the 11-win campaign in 2017 is a school record for wins. Frostburg defeated five ranked opponents since the start of the 2016 season and six ranked opponents during his five seasons. The Bobcats closed their run at NCAA Division III with three-straight 10-plus win seasons and three-consecutive Regents Cup trophies. Frostburg boasted 44 All-NJAC selections, 10 All-Region honorees and six All-American awards over the last three years. DeLane Fitzgerald entered his sixth season at the helm of the Frostburg football team entering 2019 and is the program's winningest coach with 41 victories. He is also the program's all-time leader in win percentage (.745) and boasts the fewest losses of any coach in the 58-year history of the program who coached at least five years. On his staff this year was Tye Hiatt, Fitgerald's offensive coordinator, who became the head coach of Eastern New Mexico University.

In 2019, the Bobcats made their first appearance as an NCAA Division II football team. Making the transition from NCAA Division III to NCAA Division II allowed the Bobcats to accumulate an end-of-season record with 8 wins and an (8–3) overall record. The Bobcats showed little trouble adjusting to their new division ranking and had a seven-game winning streak, finishing in their conference with a (7–3) record and a (.700) winning percentage. In overall conference play, the Bobcats stood at a (.727) winning percentage. At the end of the 2019 season, the Bobcats ranked 3rd in the MEC conference which had them tied with Charleston (WV). His coaching staff for 2019 included John Kelling, who was Fitzgerald's defense coordinator and linebackers coach.

In the spring of 2021, the Bobcats recorded a 3–1 record. In 2021, the Bobcats had a went 10–1 overall (9–1 in conference) on the season. Their only loss was at 14th-ranked Notre Dame (OH) by a score of 23 to 21. They shared the Mountain East Conference (MEC) with Notre Dame, but missed out on the playoffs because they were on a probationary period for their transition to NCAA Division II.

Fitzgerald was hired as the head coach of the Southern Utah Thunderbirds on December 14, 2021, after compiling an overall record of 62-19 in his eight seasons at Frostburg State.

The 2022 Thunderbirds improved from 1-10 the year prior to Fitzgerald’s hiring to a record of 5-6. In 2023, Fitzgerald’s team improved further to 6-5, giving Southern Utah its first winning season since 2017. In 2024, Southern Utah finished 7-5 overall and tied for second in the conference standings with a 6-2 conference record.

== Head coaching record ==
Year	Team	Overall	Conference	Standing	Bowl/playoffs	D3/AFCA^{#}
Southern Virginia Knights (NAIA independent) (2009–2012)
2009	Southern Virginia	3–8				
2010	Southern Virginia	4–7				
2011	Southern Virginia	4–7				
2012	Southern Virginia	5–6				
Southern Virginia Knights (NCAA Division III independent) (2013)
2013	Southern Virginia	8–2				
Southern Virginia:		24–30				
Frostburg State Bobcats (Empire 8) (2014)
2014	Frostburg State	4–6	2–6	8th		
Frostburg State Bobcats (New Jersey Athletic Conference) (2015–2018)
2015	Frostburg State	6–4	5–4	4th		
2016	Frostburg State	10–1	8–1	T–1st	W ECAC Bushnell Bowl	23
2017	Frostburg State	11–2	8–1	2nd	L NCAA Division III Quarterfinal	9
2018	Frostburg State	10–1	8–0	1st	L NCAA Division III Second Round	12
Frostburg State Bobcats (Mountain East Conference) (2019–2021)
2019	Frostburg State	8–3	7–3	T–2nd		
2020–21	Frostburg State	3–1	3–1	2nd (North)		
2021	Frostburg State	10–1	9–1	T–1st		22
Frostburg State:		62–19	50–17			
Southern Utah Thunderbirds (Western Athletic Conference) (2022)
2022	Southern Utah	5–6	1–3	T–4th		
Southern Utah Thunderbirds (United Athletic Conference) (2023–present)
2023	Southern Utah	6–5	4–2	T–2nd		
2024	Southern Utah	7–5	6–2	T–2nd		
2025	Southern Utah	7–5	6–2	3rd		
Southern Utah:		25–21	17–9			
Total:		111–70				
National championship Conference title Conference division title or championship game berth
