= 2023 North Alabama Lions football team =

American college football season

2023 North Alabama Lions football
- Conference: United Athletic Conference
- Record: 3–8 (1–5 UAC)
- Head coach: Brent Dearmon (1st season)
- Offensive coordinator: Kevin Wewers (1st season)
- Defensive coordinator: Brock Caraboa (1st season)
- Home stadium: Braly Municipal Stadium

2023 United Athletic Conference standings
	Conf.			Overall
Team	W		L	W		L
No. 18 Austin Peay $^	6	–	0	9	–	3
Central Arkansas	4	–	2	7	–	4
Southern Utah	4	–	2	6	–	5
Eastern Kentucky	4	–	2	5	–	6
Tarleton State*	4	–	2	8	–	3
Abilene Christian	3	–	3	5	–	6
North Alabama	1	–	5	3	–	8
Utah Tech*	1	–	5	2	–	9
Stephen F. Austin	0	–	6	3	–	8
$ – Conference champion; Note: Tarleton State and Utah Tech are ineligible for the UAC title and FCS postseason play due to transitions from NCAA Division II.; Rankings from STATS Poll

The 2023 North Alabama Lions football team represented the University of North Alabama as a member of the United Athletic Conference during the 2023 NCAA Division I FCS football season. Led by first-year head coach Brent Dearmon, the Lions played home games at the Braly Municipal Stadium in Florence, Alabama.

== Offseason ==
=== Recruits ===
Name	Pos.	Hometown
Camden Allison	DB	McKenzie, Tennessee
Kaden Cooper	ATH	Opelika, Alabama
Chris Cotton	LB	Tallahassee, Florida
Kendrick Davis	LB	Tuscaloosa, Alabama
Omareon Finch	WR	Attalla, Alabama
Izayah Fletcher	WR	Hartselle, Alabama
Seth Hampton	LB	Alabaster, Alabama
Avery Howard	DL	Tallahassee, Florida
Jyheam Ingram	DL	Muscle Shoals, Alabama
Dennis Moody	RB	Frisco, Texas
Amaire Rogers	TE	Maumelle, Arkansas
Brody Stewart	OL	Andalusia, Alabama
Isaiah Tate	QB	Germantown, Tennessee
John Taylor	DB	Fort Deposit, Alabama
Michael Towner	DL	Prichard, Alabama
Ryan Walker	OL	Alabaster, Alabama

=== Transfer portal ===
==== Outgoing transfers ====
Name	Pos.	New school
ShunDerrick Powell	RB	Central Arkansas
Christon Taylor	LB	Tennessee State
Denzel Holder	OL	Tennessee State
Micah Bland	DL	Arkansas State

==== Incoming transfers ====
Name	Pos.	Previous school
Witt Mitchum	OL	Kansas State
Edwin White-Schultz	DB	Kansas
Andrew Leak	LB	MTSU
A.J. Seay	DB	Presbyterian
Amauri Floyd	LB	Robert Morris
Gregory Reddick	DB	Saint Francis
Erin Outley	TE	Arkansas
J.J. Evans	WR	Auburn
Edgar Amaya	OL	Colorado
T.J. Smith	QB	Florida Atlantic
Rush Landell	DB	Memphis
Philjae Bien-Aime	DB	Central Florida
Kaleb Brown	DL	Coahoma Community College
Elijah Elmore	DL	Iowa Western Community College
Makenly Newbill	DL	Savannah State University
Jaylen Powell	DB	Northwest Mississippi Community College

== Personnel ==
=== Roster ===
2023 North Alabama Lions Football
Quarterbacks: 2 – TJ Smith – (redshirt) Junior (6'2, 200); 6 – Noah Walters – Sophomore (6'0, 190); 7 – Ben Harris – (redshirt) Sophomore (6'1, 203); 17 – Isaiah Tate – Freshman (6'0, 165); Carson Creehan – Freshman (6'4, 210); Brayson Edwards – (redshirt) Freshman (6'1, 183); Cade Golden – Freshman (6'0, 175); Colton Shaffer – (redshirt) Freshman (6'5, 220); Running backs: 1 – Demarcus Lacey – Sophomore (6'0, 181); 4 – Parker Driggers – (redshirt) Junior (6'0, 198); 11 – Jalyn Daniels – Sophomore (5'9, 168); 28 – Myles Murphy – (redshirt) Freshman (5'8, 193); 34 – Dennis Moody – Freshman (5'11, 180); 38 – Nic Strong – Freshman (5'10, 190); Maleek Pope – (redshirt) Freshman (5'9, 197); Wide receivers: 0 – Dakota Warfield – Senior (6'1, 197); 3 – JJ Evans – (redshirt) Junior (6'3, 203); 5 – Takairee Kenebrew – (redshirt) Senior (6'2, 190); 8 – Justin Luke – (redshirt) Sophomore (5'11, 180); 9 – David Florence – Grad Student (5'10, 185); 14 – Kobe Warden – (redshirt) Junior (5'9, 155); 18 – KJ Fields – Freshman (6'0, 186); 23 – Kaden Cooper – Freshman (6'0, 180); 26 – Winston Sweeting – Senior (6'0, 190); 80 – Sawyer Heptinstall – (redshirt) Sophomore (6'2, 197); 81 – Ollie Finch Jr. – (redshirt) Sophomore (6'1, 182); 82 – Ryan Shoop – (redshirt) Freshman (6'3, 178); 83 – Nikki Taylor – (redshirt) Freshman (5'9, 159); 84 – Omareon Finch – Freshman (6'2, 179); 85 – Izayah Flecther – Freshman (6'2, 170); Daniel Cooper – Freshman (6'0, 170); Tight ends: 19 – Kenny Rawls – (redshirt) Junior (6'3, 228); 30 – Jakob Cummings – (redshirt) Senior (6'0, 218); 36 – Erin Outley – (redshirt) Sophomore (6'4, 255); 86 – Amarie Rogers – Freshman (6'5, 254); 87 – Nathan Brockway – Freshman (6'4, 215); 88 – Kaleb Heatherly – Sophomore (6'6, 255); Kicker/Punter: 35 – Adam Watford – Freshman (5'11, 175) (P); 37 – Sam Contorno – (redshirt) Junior (5'9, 177) (K); 42 – Thomas Dowis – (redshirt) Sophomore (6'1, 205) (K); 92 – Nathan Ogletree – (redshirt) Freshman (6'2, 170) (P/K); 96 – Jack RIce – Freshman (6'1, 165) (K/P); Zach Aird – Freshman (5'10, 170) (K); Long snappers: 47 – Nathan Curry – Freshman (6'0, 198); 53 – Evan Godwin – (redshirt) Freshman (5'11, 200)	Offensive Lineman: 51 – Ryan Walker – Freshman (6'3, 260); 55 – Edgar Amaya – (redshirt) Freshman (6'3, 315); 57 – Amir Graham – (redshirt) Freshman (5'11, 275); 63 – Brody Stewart – Freshman (6'2, 310); 65 – Collin Wright – (redshirt) Freshman (6'3, 308); 67 – Logan McInnish – (redshirt) Sophomore (6'4, 340); 68 – Stevie Young – Senior (6'4, 293); 72 – Witt Mitchum – (redshirt) Sophomore (6'6, 295); 73 – Edgerrin Watson – (redshirt) Freshman (6'2, 270); 74 – Gage Saint – Junior (6'4, 289); 75 – Will Derico – Senior (6'4, 312); 76 – Fau Tai’Vai – Junior (6'2, 340); 77 – Mickel Clay – Junior (6'5, 278); 79 – Raykwon Goldthwaite – (redshirt) Freshman (6'8, 310); La’Charles Taylor – Junior (6'4, 320); Defensive Lineman: 0 – Kam’ron Green – Junior (6'4, 230); 15 – Makenly Newbill – Grad Student (6'1, 255); 16 – Javen Augustus – Sophomore (6'4, 206); 33 – E.J. Colbert – (redshirt) Sophomore (6'0, 252); 44 – Philip Ossai – Senior (6'0, 258); 45 – Tyrik Daniels – (redshirt) Sophomore (5'11, 228); 50 – Grant Wisdom – (redshirt) Junior (5'11, 278); 54 – Jyheam Ingram – Freshman (6'1, 280); 56 – Trenton Townsend – Junior (6'4, 295); 58 – Elijah Elmore – (redshirt) Sophomore (6'0, 300); 99 – Kaleb Brown – Sophomore (6'0, 280); Chauncey Myers – Grad Student (6'1, 270); Defensive Tackles: 91 – Jake McCluskey – (redshirt) Freshman (6'0, 267)	Linebackers: 4 – Rush Landell – (redshirt) Junior (6'3, 215); 6 – Gallil Guillaume – Senior (6'1, 227); 8 – Shaun Myers – Junior (6'1, 208); 10 – Amauri Floyd – Junior (6'1, 210); 21 – Ashaad Williams – (redshirt) Sophomore (6'2, 178); 22 – A.J. Phillips – Junior (6'0, 225); 31 – Andrew Leak – (redshirt) Sophomore (6'0, 215); 38 – Garrick Ponder – (redshirt) Freshman (6'2, 229); 40 – Aidan Robinson – (redshirt) Sophomore (6'2, 216); 46 – Phil McDuff – (redshirt) Sophomore (6'0, 221); 48 – Seth Hampton – Freshman (5'11, 210); 52 – Kendrick Davis – Freshman (6'0, 218); 94 – Jamarion Augustus – Sophomore (6'3, 205); 98 – Chris Cotton – Freshman (6'0, 200); Boone Swinney – (redshirt) Freshman (5'10, 200); Defensive Ends: 41 – Tyler Antkowaik – (redshirt) Junior (6'5, 238); 90 – Avery Johnson – Freshman (6'3, 240); 97 – Elijah Hartnett – (redshirt) Freshman (6'1, 247); Zacchaeus Dixon – Freshman (6'2, 240); Defensive Backs: 1 – Edwin White Schultz – (redshirt) Junior (6'1, 205); 3 – K.J. Trujillo – (redshirt) Junior (6'0, 180); 5 – Ryan Madison – Sophomore (5'11, 187); 7 – Philjae Bien-Amie – (redshirt) Freshman (5'11, 185); 9 – Gregory Reddick – (redshirt) Junior (5'11, 195); 12 – Jaquan Woods – (redshirt) Sophomore (5'8, 164); 13 – Barry Womack – Senior (6'2, 187); 20 – A.J. Seay – (redshirt) Sophomore (6'0, 185); 24 – Cameron Jamar – (redshirt) Sophomore (5'8, 178); 25 – Keenan Hill – (redshirt) Freshman (5'11, 173); 27 – Camden Allison – Freshman (6'0, 185); 29 – Jaylen Powell – Sophomore (5'11, 190); 39 – Josiah Hixon – Freshman (5'8, 188); 43 – Kyler Murks – Sophomore (6'1, 185); 49 – Kenan Jones – Sophomore (6'2, 178); Cody Collinsworth – (redshirt) Sophomore (6'0, 190); Allen Smith – (redshirt) Junior (5'9, 170); John Taylor – Freshman (6'0, 160); Legend: Redshirt

== Coaching staff ==
North Alabama Lions coaches

Head coach

- Brent Dearmon

Assistant coaches

- Brock Caraboa – Assistant Head Coach/Defensive Coordinator
- Kevin Wewers – Offensive Coordinator/Tight Ends
- Luke Roth – Special Teams Coordinator/Nickels
- Jake Bentley – Quarterbacks/Video Coordinator
- Morgan Cruce – Running Backs/Director of Football Operations
- Samie Parker – Wide Receivers
- Richard Hutchings – Offensive Line
- Thomas Johnston – Defensive Line
- De’Von Lockett – Defensive Backs
- Wesley White – Offensive Analyst
- Kyle Persons – Defensive Analyst
- Kerryon Johnson – Director of Player Development

== Schedule ==
Date	Time	Opponent	Site	TV	Result	Attendance
August 26	2:30 p.m.	vs. No. 20 Mercer*	Cramton Bowl; Montgomery, AL (FCS Kickoff)	ESPN	L 7–17	5,566
September 2	6:00 p.m.	Chattanooga*	Braly Municipal Stadium; Florence, AL	ESPN+	W 41–27	9,361
September 9	6:00 p.m.	at Tarleton State	Memorial Stadium; Stephenville, TX	ESPN+	L 31–52	20,127
September 16	6:00 p.m.	at Tennessee Tech*	Tucker Stadium; Cookeville, TN	ESPN+	W 20–7	7,676
September 23	6:00 p.m.	UT Martin*	Braly Municipal Stadium; Florence, AL	ESPN+	L 21–37	8,836
September 30	6:00 p.m.	Eastern Kentucky^{†}	Braly Municipal Stadium; Florence, AL	ESPN+	L 22–32	11,430
October 14	3:00 p.m.	at Abilene Christian	Wildcat Stadium; Abilene, TX	ESPN+	L 13–30	10,383
October 21	6:00 p.m.	Utah Tech	Braly Municipal Stadium; Florence, AL	ESPN+	W 31–30	8,840
October 28	3:00 p.m.	at No. 20 Austin Peay	Fortera Stadium; Clarksville, TN	ESPN+	L 39–49	8,698
November 4	4:00 p.m.	Central Arkansas	Braly Municipal Stadium; Florence, AL	ESPN+	L 14–27	9,003
November 18	5:30 p.m.	at No. 4 (FBS) Florida State*	Doak Campbell Stadium; Tallahassee, FL	The CW	L 13–58	79,560
*Non-conference game; ^{†}Homecoming; Rankings from STATS Poll released prior to the game; All times are in Central time

== Game summaries ==
=== at No. 20 Mercer ===
Team	1	2	3	4	Total
North Alabama	7	0	0	0	7
• Mercer	7	3	0	7	17

- Date: August 26
- Location: Cramton Bowl
- Game start: 2:36 p.m.
- Game attendance: 5,566
- Game weather: 102, Sunny, Wind S @ 7 mph
- Referee: Brian Holland
- TV announcers (ESPN): Roy Philpott (play-by-play), Roddy Jones (color), and Taylor McGregor (sideline)

Statistics	Mercer	UNA
First downs	21	12
Total yards	286	248
Rushing yards	170	156
Passing yards	92	115
Turnovers	0	0
Time of possession	32:35	27:25

Team	Category	Player	Statistics
Mercer	Passing	Carter Peevy	12/17, 115 yards, 1 TD
Mercer	Rushing	Micah Bell	20 carries, 73 yards
Mercer	Receiving	Ty James	4 receptions, 57 yards, 1 TD
UNA	Passing	Noah Walters	10/17, 65 yards
UNA	Rushing	Jalyn Daniels	3 carries, 49 yards
UNA	Receiving	Kobe Warren	6 receptions, 37 yards

Scoring summary

Quarter	Time	Drive			Team	Scoring information	Score	
Quarter	Time	Plays	Yards	TOP	Team	Scoring information	North Alabama	#20 Mercer
1st	10:06	9	49	4:54	MER	Ty James 14-yard touchdown reception from Carter Peevy, Reice Griffith kick good	0	7
1st	1:44	6	51	3:18	UNA	TJ Smith 3-yard touchdown run, Sam Contorno kick good	7	7
2nd	4:40	11	59	3:19	MER	24-yard field goal by Riece Griffith	7	10
4th	11:45	8	41	3:44	MER	Micah Bell 3-yard touchdown run, Riece Griffith kick good	7	17
"TOP" = time of possession. For other American football terms, see Glossary of American football.							7	17

=== Chattanooga ===
Team	1	2	3	4	Total
Chattanooga	0	10	10	7	27
• North Alabama	14	7	0	20	41

- Date: September 2
- Location: Braly Stadium
- Game start: 6:02 p.m.
- Game attendance: 9,361
- Game weather: 85, Sunny, Wind NW @ 5 mph
- Referee: Gabriel Tomlin
- TV announcers (ESPN+): Benjamin Ray (play-by-play) and Brian Neece (color)

Statistics	UTC	UNA
First downs	29	21
Total yards	488	517
Rushing yards	183	280
Passing yards	311	271
Turnovers	1	0
Time of possession	34:19	25:41

Team	Category	Player	Statistics
UTC	Passing	Chase Artopoeus	22/46, 311 yards, 2 TD's, 1 INT
UTC	Rushing	Ailym Ford	24 carries, 90 yards
UTC	Receiving	Javin Whatley	6 receptions, 106 yards
UNA	Passing	Noah Walters	16/28, 271 yards, 4 TD's
UNA	Rushing	Jalyn Daniels	8 carries, 147 yards, 2 TD's
UNA	Receiving	Takairee Kenebrew	5 receptions, 172 yards, 3 TD's

Scoring summary

Quarter	Time	Drive			Team	Scoring information	Score	
Quarter	Time	Plays	Yards	TOP	Team	Scoring information	Chattanooga	North Alabama
1st	11:54	8	88	3:02	UNA	Takairee Kenebrew 25-yard touchdown reception from Noah Walters, Sam Contorno kick good	0	7
1st	6:00	1	59	0:08	UNA	Takairee Kenebrew 59-yard touchdown reception from Noah Walters, Sam Contorno kick good	0	14
2nd	14:00	9	80	2:26	UNA	Takairee Kenebrew 21-yard touchdown reception from Noah Walters, Sam Contorno kick good	0	21
2nd	12:36	4	75	1:39	UTC	Sam Phillips 8-yard touchdown reception from Chase Artopoeus, Jude Kelley kick good	7	21
2nd	8:09	7	56	2:31	UTC	27-yard field goal by Jude Kelley	10	21
3rd	12:05	1	36	0:05	UTC	Chris Houston 36-yard touchdown reception from Chase Artopoeus, Jude Kelley kick good	17	21
3rd	6:12	9	53	3:32	UTC	20-yard field goal by Jude Kelley	20	21
4th	14:58	10	63	4:55	UTC	Gino Appleberry 2-yard touchdown run, Jude Kelley kick good	27	21
4th	8:49	3	64	1:01	UNA	Jalyn Daniels 10-yard touchdown run, Sam Contorno kick no good	27	27
4th	6:17	5	53	1:57	UNA	Dakota Warfield 10-yard touchdown reception from Noah Walters, Sam Contorno kick good	27	34
4th	1:00	2	90	0:50	UNA	Jalyn Daniels 81-yard touchdown run, Sam Contorno kick good	27	41
"TOP" = time of possession. For other American football terms, see Glossary of American football.							27	41

=== at Tarleton State ===
Team	1	2	3	4	Total
North Alabama	14	14	3	0	31
• Tarleton State	14	3	21	14	52

- Date: September 9
- Location: Memorial Stadium
- Game start: 6:45 p.m.
- Game attendance: 20,127
- Game weather: Sunny
- Referee: JT Tate
- Television network: ESPN+

Statistics	Tarleton State	UNA
First downs	17	32
Total yards	481	563
Rushing yards	182	220
Passing yards	299	343
Turnovers	1	1
Time of possession	23:47	36:13

Team	Category	Player	Statistics
Tarleton State	Passing	Victor Gabalis	13/22, 299 yards, 4 TD's, 1 INT
Tarleton State	Rushing	Kayvon Britton	14 carries, 69 yards, 1 TD
Tarleton State	Receiving	Keylan Johnson	6 receptions, 219 yards, 4 TD's
UNA	Passing	Noah Walters	36/63, 343 yards, 1 INT
UNA	Rushing	Demarcus Lacey	16 carries, 97 yards, 2 TD's
UNA	Receiving	David Florence	8 receptions, 82 yards

Scoring summary

Quarter	Time	Drive			Team	Scoring information	Score	
Quarter	Time	Plays	Yards	TOP	Team	Scoring information	North Alabama	Tarleton State
1st	6:59	10	49	3:53	UNA	Jalyn Daniels 1-yard touchdown run, Sam Contorno kick good	7	0
1st	5:24	4	34	0:54	UNA	Demarcus Lacey 2-yard touchdown run, Sam Contorno kick good	14	0
1st	3:38	7	75	1:46	TSU	Derrel Kelley III 12-yard touchdown run, Adrian Guzman kick good	14	7
1st	0:36	3	53	0:55	TSU	Keylan Johnson 13-yard touchdown reception from Victor Gabalis, Adrian Guzman kick good	14	14
2nd	8:52	9	67	3:52	UNA	Demarcus Lacey 9-yard touchdown run, Sam Contorno kick good	21	14
2nd	4:19	6	46	2:46	UNA	Noah Walters 3-yard touchdown run, Sam Contorno kick good	28	14
2nd	2:14	5	8	1:52	TSU	25-yard field goal by Adrian Guzman	28	17
3rd	12:05	1	64	0:10	TSU	Keylan Johnson 13-yard touchdown reception from Victor Gabalis, Adrian Guzman kick good	28	24
3rd	9:29	10	53	3:21	UNA	39-yard field goal by Sam Contorno	31	24
3rd	8:02	4	73	1:21	TSU	Keylan Johnson 55-yard touchdown reception from Victor Gabalis, Adrian Guzman kick good	31	31
3rd	4:17	6	70	2:30	TSU	Kayvon Britten 8-yard touchdown run, Adrian Guzman kick good	31	38
4th	12:36	4	24	1:35	TSU	Keylan Johnson 16-yard touchdown reception from Victor Gabalis, Adrian Guzman kick good	31	45
4th	10:36				TSU	Interception returned 50 yards for touchdown by Robert Rios, Adrian Guzman kick good	31	52
"TOP" = time of possession. For other American football terms, see Glossary of American football.							31	52

=== at Tennessee Tech ===
Team	1	2	3	4	Total
• North Alabama	10	7	3	0	20
Tennessee Tech	7	0	0	0	7

- Date: September 16
- Location: Tucker Stadium
- Game start: 6:02 p.m.
- Game attendance: 7,676
- Game weather: 70, Light Rain, Wind N @ 5 mph
- Referee: Douglas Mercer
- Television network: ESPN+

Statistics	TTU	UNA
First downs	19	15
Total yards	296	259
Rushing yards	99	178
Passing yards	197	81
Turnovers	5	3
Time of possession	23:47	36:13

Team	Category	Player	Statistics
TTU	Passing	Hayes Gibson	9/18, 133 yards
TTU	Rushing	Marcus Knight	11 carries, 39 yards
TTU	Receiving	Brad Clark	6 receptions, 108 yards
UNA	Passing	Noah Walters	7/13, 55 yards, 2 INT's
UNA	Rushing	Demarcus Lacey	23 carries, 139 yards
UNA	Receiving	Kobe Warden	2 receptions, 28 yards

Scoring summary

Quarter	Time	Drive			Team	Scoring information	Score	
Quarter	Time	Plays	Yards	TOP	Team	Scoring information	North Alabama	Tennessee Tech
1st	10:51	4	4	1:19	UNA	42-yard field goal by Sam Contorno	3	0
1st	4:47				TTU	Interception returned 85 yards for touchdown by Jacque McGowen, Hayden Olsen kick good	3	7
1st	1:10				UNA	Interception returned 44 yards for touchdown by AJ Seay, Sam Contorno kick good	10	7
2nd	7:37	4	33	1:44	UNA	TJ Smith 26-yard touchdown reception from Noah Walters, Sam Contorno kick good	17	7
3rd	0:16	9	29	4:10	UNA	32-yard field goal by Sam Contorno	20	7
"TOP" = time of possession. For other American football terms, see Glossary of American football.							20	7

=== UT Martin ===
Team	1	2	3	4	Total
• UT Martin	7	3	13	14	37
North Alabama	14	7	0	0	21

- Date: September 23
- Location: Braly Stadium
- Game start: 6:02 p.m.
- Game attendance: 8,836
- Game weather: Sunny
- Referee: Brandon McCain
- TV announcers (ESPN+): Benjamin Ray (play-by-play) and Brian Neece (color)

Statistics	UTM	UNA
First downs	21	23
Total yards	480	391
Rushing yards	308	95
Passing yards	172	296
Turnovers	2	1
Time of possession	30:38	29:22

Team	Category	Player	Statistics
UTM	Passing	Kinkead Dent	13/30, 172 yards, 1 TD, 1 INT
UTM	Rushing	Sam Franklin	32 carries, 221 yards, 2 TD's
UTM	Receiving	Trevonte Rucker	4 receptions, 60 yards
UNA	Passing	Noah Walters	30/52, 286 yards, 3 TD's
UNA	Rushing	Parker Driggers	6 carries, 33 yards
UNA	Receiving	Kobe Warden	11 receptions, 106 yards, 1 TD

=== Eastern Kentucky ===
Team	1	2	3	4	Total
• Eastern Kentucky	15	14	0	3	32
North Alabama	7	0	7	8	22

- Date: September 30
- Location: Braly Stadium
- Game start: 6:03 p.m.
- Game attendance: 11,430
- Game weather: Sunny
- Referee: Matthew Jones
- TV announcers (ESPN+): Benjamin Ray (play-by-play) and Brian Neece (color)

Statistics	EKU	UNA
First downs	18	29
Total yards	460	560
Rushing yards	204	135
Passing yards	256	425
Turnovers	2	4
Time of possession	27:04	32:56

Team	Category	Player	Statistics
EKU	Passing	Parker McKinney	14/21, 256 yards, 2 TD's, 2 INT's
EKU	Rushing	Joshua Carter	20 carries, 138 yards, 1 TD
EKU	Receiving	Jaden Smith	4 receptions, 75 yards, 1 TD
UNA	Passing	Noah Walters	21/32, 348 yards, 2 TD's, 2 INT's
UNA	Rushing	Noah Walters	7 carries, 56 yards
UNA	Receiving	Takairee Kenebrew	5 receptions, 121 yards, 1 TD

=== at Abilene Christian ===
Team	1	2	3	4	Total
North Alabama	0	7	6	0	13
• Abilene Christian	3	10	3	14	30

- Date: October 14
- Location: Anthony Field at Wildcat Stadium
- Game start: 3:02 p.m.
- Game attendance: 10,383
- Game weather: 70, Sunny, Wind N at 16 mph
- Referee: Brad Carrell
- Television network: ESPN+

Statistics	ACU	UNA
First downs	13	23
Total yards	333	423
Rushing yards	127	191
Passing yards	206	232
Turnovers	0	5
Time of possession	23:15	36:43

Team	Category	Player	Statistics
ACU	Passing	Maverick McIvor	12/24, 206 yards, 2 TD's
ACU	Rushing	Rovaughn Banks Jr.	10 carries, 78 yards, 1 TD
ACU	Receiving	Tristan Golightly	3 receptions, 63 yards, 1 TD
UNA	Passing	Noah Walters	28/43, 232 yards, 2 TD's, 4 INT's
UNA	Rushing	Demarcus Lacey	18 carries, 72 yards
UNA	Receiving	Takairee Kenebrew	4 receptions, 59 yards, 1 TD

=== Utah Tech ===
Team	1	2	3	4	Total
Utah Tech	0	10	7	13	30
• North Alabama	7	10	7	7	31

- Date: October 21
- Location: Braly Stadium
- Game start: 6:03 p.m.
- Game attendance: 8,840
- Game weather: 80, Sunny, Wind E at 13 mph
- Referee: Reid Jackson
- TV announcers (ESPN+): Benjamin Ray (play-by-play) and Brian Neece (color)

Statistics	Utah Tech	UNA
First downs	24	23
Total yards	505	420
Rushing yards	108	302
Passing yards	397	118
Turnovers	0	0
Time of possession	28:15	31:45

Team	Category	Player	Statistics
Utah Tech	Passing	Kobe Tracy	26/40, 397 yards, 3 TD's
Utah Tech	Rushing	Ronnie Walker Jr.	13 carries, 71 yards, 1 TD
Utah Tech	Receiving	Jaivian Lofton	4 receptions, 105 yards
UNA	Passing	Noah Walters	13/19, 118 yards, 1 TD
UNA	Rushing	Noah Walters	12 carries, 105 yards
UNA	Receiving	Dakota Warfield	2 receptions, 35 yards, 1 TD

=== at No. 20 Austin Peay ===
Team	1	2	3	4	Total
North Alabama	6	12	8	13	39
• Austin Peay	17	22	7	3	49

- Date: October 28
- Location: Fortera Stadium
- Game start: 3:03 p.m.
- Game attendance: 8,698
- Game weather: 78, Cloudy, Wind N @ 8 mph
- Referee: Zach Erdmann
- Television network: ESPN+

Statistics	AP	UNA
First downs	23	20
Total yards	520	408
Rushing yards	167	57
Passing yards	353	351
Turnovers	0	0
Time of possession	34:39	25:11

Team	Category	Player	Statistics
AP	Passing	Mike DiLiello	20/25, 353 yards, 6 TD's
AP	Rushing	Jevon Jackson	30 carries, 160 yards
AP	Receiving	Trey Goodman	5 receptions, 129 yards, 1 TD
UNA	Passing	Noah Walters	29/52, 351 yards, 5 TD's
UNA	Rushing	Noah Walters	9 carries, 31 yards, 1 TD
UNA	Receiving	Dakota Warfield	7 receptions, 88 yards

=== No. 25 Central Arkansas ===
Team	1	2	3	4	Total
• No. 25 Central Arkansas	14	7	3	3	27
North Alabama	0	0	8	6	14

- Date: November 4
- Location: Braly Stadium
- Game start: 4:02 p.m.
- Game attendance: 9,003
- Game weather: Sunny
- Referee: Drew Myers
- TV announcers (ESPN+): Benjamin Ray (play-by-play) and Brian Neece (color)

Statistics	UCA	UNA
First downs	21	15
Total yards	400	275
Rushing yards	152	63
Passing yards	248	212
Turnovers	0	2
Time of possession	35:02	24:58

Team	Category	Player	Statistics
UCA	Passing	Will McElvain	22/33, 248 yards, 1 TD
UCA	Rushing	Darius Hale	16 carries, 70 yards, 1 TD
UCA	Receiving	Jarrod Barnes	9 receptions, 113 yards, 1 TD
UNA	Passing	Noah Walters	21/36, 212 yards, 2 TD's, 2 INT's
UNA	Rushing	Noah Walters	14 carries, 55 yards
UNA	Receiving	Takairee Kenebrew	7 receptions, 107 yards, 2 TD's

=== at No. 4 (FBS) Florida State ===
Team	1	2	3	4	Total
North Alabama	13	0	0	0	13
• No. 4 (FBS) Florida State	0	24	14	20	58

- Date: November 18
- Location: Doak Campbell Stadium
- Game start: 6:40 p.m.
- Game attendance: 76,560
- Game weather: 72, Clear, Wind NW @ 7 mph
- Referee: Riley Johnson
- TV announcers (The CW): Tom Werme (play-by-play), James Bates (color), and Trevor Scales (sideline)

Statistics	FSU	UNA
First downs	26	14
Total yards	521	226
Rushing yards	248	143
Passing yards	273	83
Turnovers	0	2
Time of possession	28:18	31:42

Team	Category	Player	Statistics
FSU	Passing	Tate Rodemaker	13/23, 217 yards, 2 TD's
FSU	Rushing	C.J. Campbell Jr.	3 carries, 78 yards, 1 TD
FSU	Receiving	Jaheim Bell	2 receptions, 59 yards
UNA	Passing	Noah Walters	13/26, 65 yards, 2 TD's, 1 INT
UNA	Rushing	J.J. Evans	1 carry, 49 yards
UNA	Receiving	Dennis Moody	3 receptions, 30 yards

Scoring summary

Quarter	Time	Drive			Team	Scoring information	Score	
Quarter	Time	Plays	Yards	TOP	Team	Scoring information	UNA	FSU
1st	7:15	7	86	3:36	UNA	Takairee Kenebrew 13-yard touchdown reception from Noah Walters, Sam Contorno kick good	7	0
1st	1:57	8	80	3:46	UNA	JJ Evans 6-yard touchdown reception from Noah Walters, Sam Contorno kick blocked	13	0
2nd	12:31	10	60	4:26	FSU	23-yard field goal by Ryan Fitzgerald	13	3
2nd	8:38	2	7	0:33	FSU	Trey Benson 4-yard touchdown run, Ryan Fitzgerald kick good	13	10
2nd	5:04	4	52	1:42	FSU	Caziah Holmes 3-yard touchdown run, Ryan Fitzgerald kick good	13	17
2nd	0:40	4	80	0:41	FSU	Lawrance Toafili 17-yard touchdown run, Ryan Fitzgerald kick good	13	24
3rd	2:16	12	76	4:32	FSU	Caziah Holmes 26-yard touchdown reception from Tate Rodemaker, Ryan Fitzgerald kick good	13	31
3rd	1:12	1	24	0:05	FSU	Keon Coleman 24-yard touchdown reception from Tate Rodemaker, Ryan Fitzgerald kick good	13	38
4th	14:37	1	70	0:11	FSU	CJ Campbell Jr 70-yard touchdown run, Ryan Fitzgerald kick good	13	45
4th	3:43	8	70	4:45	FSU	Brock Glenn 11-yard touchdown run, Ryan Fitzgerald kick good	13	52
4th	0:00				FSU	Quindarrius Jones 50-yard blocked field goal return	13	58
"TOP" = time of possession. For other American football terms, see Glossary of American football.							13	58

== Statistics ==
=== Team ===
	North Alabama	Opp
Scoring	252	366
Points per game	22.91	33.27
First downs	227	232
Rushing	88	81
Passing	112	124
Penalty	27	27
Rushing yards	1786	1942
Avg per play	4.3	4.5
Avg per game	162.4	176.5
Rushing touchdowns	11	19
Passing yards	2504	2827
Att-Comp-Int	413-240-13	326-187-8
Avg per pass	6.06	8.67
Avg per catch	10.43	15.12
Avg per game	227.64	257.00
Passing touchdowns	23	24
Total offense	4290	4769
Plays	828	757
Avg per play	5.2	6.3
Avg per game	390.0	433.5
Fumbles-Lost	18-11	18-7
Penalties-Yards	80-746	80-709
Avg per game	67.82	64.45

	North Alabama	Opp
Punt-Yards	58-2442	48-2038
Avg per punt	42.10	42.46
Avg per punt net	39.78	39.67
Punt Return-Yards	14-54	17-75
Avg per punt return	3.86	4.41
Kickoffs-Yards	48-2870	69-4184
Avg per kick	59.79	60.35
Avg per kick net	43.29	46.75
Kickoff Return-Yards	20-298	19-412
Avg per kickoff return	14.90	21.68
Interceptions-Yards	8-72	13-193
Avg per play	9.00	14.85
Time of possession / game	30:00	30:00
3rd down conversions (Pct%)	56-179 (31.28%)	54-153 (35.29%)
4th down conversions (Pct%)	25-43 (58.14%)	6-20 (30%)
Touchdowns scored	35	46
Field goals-Attempts	4-9	15-18
PAT-Attempts	24-28	41-42
Sack by Yards	17-93	25-185
Misc Yards	0	52
Onside kicks	0-2	0-1
Red zone scores	25-35 (71.43%)	38-45 (84.44%)
Red zone touchdowns	23-35 (65.71%)	26-45 (57.77%)
Attendance	47,470	132,010
Date/Avg per date	5-9,494	6-22,002
Neutral Site	0-0	

=== Individual leaders ===
Passing Statistics
#	NAME	POS	RAT	CMP	ATT	YDS	AVG/G	CMP%	TD	INT	LONG
6	Noah Walters	QB	121.56	224	382	2346	213.27	58.64	21	13	59
2	TJ Smith	QB	124.46	14	26	140	28	53.85	2	0	26
7	Ben Harris	QB	87.80	2	4	18	9	50	0	0	11
	TOTALS		121.12	240	413	2504	227.64	58.11%	23	13	59

Rushing Statistics
#	NAME	POS	ATT	GAIN	AVG	TD	LONG	AVG/G
1	Demarcus Lacey	RB	121	620 yrds	4.9	3 TDs	45	53.55
6	Noah Walters	QB	104	532 yrds	3.7	2 TDs	37	35.18
11	Jayln Daniels	RB	16	223 yrds	13.9	3 TDs	81	74.33
4	Parker Driggers	RB	65	236 yrds	3.4	0 TDs	20	27.38
34	Dennis Moody	RB	40	119 yrds	2.7	1 TD	45	53.55
23	Kaden Cooper	WR	16	76 yrds	4.3	0 TDs	27	6.27
30	Jakob Cummings	TE	14	69 yrds	4.9	1 TD	20	6.27
3	JJ Evans	WR	1	64 yrds	64.0	0 TDs	64	5.82
14	Kobe Warden	WR	9	60 yrds	4.9	0 TDs	28	4.00
2	TJ Smith	QB	20	69 yrds	0.7	1 TD	15	2.80
9	David Florence	WR	1	4 yrds	4.0	0 TDs	4	0.36
28	Myles Murphy	RB	3	3 yrds	1.0	0 TDs	2	0.75
18	KJ Fields	WR	1	2 yrds	2.0	0 TDs	2	0.18
7	Ben Harris	QB	3	13 yrds	-0.7	0 TDs	8	-1.00
	TOTALS		415	2090 yrds	4.3	11 TDs	81	162.36

== Media Affiliates ==
=== Radio ===
- Florence - WLX (98.3/103.5)

=== TV ===
- The CW Family – WHDF (CW), CW Sports
- ESPN Family – ESPN, ESPN+

=== TV ratings ===
Opponent	Outlet	Viewers	Rating
No. 20 Mercer	ESPN	457,000	0.27
Chattanooga	ESPN+	†	†
at Tarleton State	ESPN+	†	†
at Tennessee Tech	ESPN+	†	†
UT Martin	ESPN+	†	†
Eastern Kentucky	ESPN+	†	†
at Abilene Christian	ESPN+	†	†
Utah Tech	ESPN+	†	†
at No. 20 Austin Peay	ESPN+	†	†
Central Arkansas	ESPN+	†	†
at No. 4 Florida State	The CW	1,330,000	0.7

All totals via Sports Media Watch. Streaming numbers not included. † - Data not available.
