= United Athletic Conference (disambiguation) =

United Athletic Conference may refer to:

- United Athletic Conference (football), a football-only NCAA Division I alliance
- Western Athletic Conference, the NCAA Division I conference scheduled to rebrand as the United Athletic Conference in 2026
