= John Kelling =

John Kelling may refer to:

- Fedor Kelling (John Fedor Augustus Kelling, 1820–1909), member of the New Zealand Parliament
- John Kelling (American football), American college football coach
