= Keith Patterson =

American football player and coach (born 1964)

Current position
- Title: Head coach
- Team: Abilene Christian
- Conference: UAC
- Record: 30–20

Biographical details
- Born: May 20, 1964 (age 62); Marlow, Oklahoma, U.S.

Playing career
- 1982–1986: East Central
- Position: Defensive back

Coaching career (HC unless noted)
- 1986: East Central (GA)
- 1988–1991: Altus HS (OK) (OLB/DB)
- 1992–1993: Edmond Memorial HS (OK) (DB)
- 1994: Edmond Santa Fe HS (OK)
- 1995–1996: Allen HS (TX) (assistant)
- 1997–1999: Ardmore HS (OK)
- 2000: Allen HS (TX) (assistant)
- 2002: Allen HS (TX) (assistant)
- 2003–2005: Tulsa (LB)
- 2006–2010: Tulsa (co-DC/LB)
- 2011: Pittsburgh (DC/LB/interim HC)
- 2012: Arkansas State (DC)
- 2012: West Virginia (co-DC/LB)
- 2013: West Virginia (DC/LB)
- 2014–2017: Arizona State (DC/DST)
- 2018: Utah State (co-DC)
- 2019–2021: Texas Tech (DC)
- 2022–present: Abilene Christian

Head coaching record
- Overall: 30–21 (college)
- Bowls: 0–1
- Tournaments: 2–2 (FCS)

Accomplishments and honors

Championships
- 2 UAC (2024, 2025); 1 WAC (2022)

Awards
- WAC Coach of the Year (2022)

Keith Patterson (born May 20, 1964) is an American football coach. He is the head football coach at Abilene Christian University. Prior to that he was the defensive coordinator at Texas Tech University; while there, Patterson served as the team's head coach for a 16–13 win against Kansas in 2020. Patterson was previously the defensive coordinator at Arizona State University for four years. Patterson was also the defensive coordinator and linebackers coach for the West Virginia Mountaineers. Before one season at West Virginia, Patterson was the defensive coordinator for the Arkansas State Red Wolves on January 4, 2012, only to resign from the position six weeks later to join the West Virginia coaching staff. Prior to his arrival at Arkansas State, Patterson was elevated from defensive coordinator to interim head coach following the resignation of Todd Graham on December 13, 2011, at Pittsburgh.

== Abilene Christian ==
On December 6, 2021, Footballscoop.com reported that Patterson would get his first opportunity as a full-time head coach at Abilene Christian University, replacing Adam Dorrel.

== Head coaching record ==
=== College ===
Year	Team	Overall	Conference	Standing	Bowl/playoffs	STATS^{#}	Coaches^{°}
Pittsburgh Panthers (Big East Conference) (2011)
2011	Pittsburgh	0–1	0–0		L BBVA Compass		
Pittsburgh:		0–1	0–0				
Abilene Christian Wildcats (Western Athletic Conference) (2022)
2022	Abilene Christian	7–4	3–1	T–1st			
Abilene Christian Wildcats (United Athletic Conference) (2023–present)
2023	Abilene Christian	5–6	3–3	6th			
2024	Abilene Christian	9–5	7–1	1st	L NCAA Division I Second Round	14	14
2025	Abilene Christian	9–5	7–1	T–1st	L NCAA Division I Second Round	12	12
Abilene Christian:		30–20	20–6				
Total:		30–21					
National championship Conference title Conference division title or championship game berth
