= Walt Wells =

American football coach and player (born 1967)

Current position
- Title: Head coach
- Team: Eastern Kentucky
- Conference: UAC
- Record: 36–36

Biographical details
- Born: October 26, 1967 (age 59); Nashville, Tennessee, U.S.
- Education: Belmont University

Playing career
- 1986–1989: Austin Peay
- Position: Offensive lineman

Coaching career (HC unless noted)
- 1994–1996: Cumberland (TN) (AHC/OC)
- 1997–1999: Eastern Kentucky (TE)
- 2000–2002: Eastern Kentucky (OL)
- 2003–2012: Western Kentucky (OC/OL)
- 2013: South Florida (OC/OL)
- 2014: New Mexico State (OL)
- 2015: Eastern Kentucky (AHC/OL)
- 2016: Tennessee (OQC)
- 2017: Tennessee (OL)
- 2018–2019: Kentucky (QC)
- 2020–present: Eastern Kentucky

Head coaching record
- Overall: 36–36
- Tournaments: 0–2 (NCAA D-I playoffs)

Accomplishments and honors

Championships
- 1 ASUN (2022)

Awards
- 2× ASUN Coach of the Year (2021–2022); AFCA FCS Region Number 3 Coach of the Year (2021)

Walt Wells (born October 26, 1967) is an American college football coach. He is the head football coach at Eastern Kentucky University, a position he has held since 2020.

== Career ==
Wells has over 20 years of coaching experience as an offensive line coach and coordinator with previous stops at Eastern Kentucky (1997–2002, 2015), New Mexico State (2014), South Florida (2013) and Western Kentucky (2003–2012). He also coached at Cumberland University from 1994 to 1996 and Smryna High School from 1992 to 1993.

On February 7, 2017, Walt Wells was promoted to offensive line coach at the University of Tennessee. He joined the Vols in the spring of 2016 as an offensive quality control coach, working primarily with the offensive line.

On December 9, 2019, Wells was hired as the 15th head football coach at Eastern Kentucky University.

== Personal life ==
Wells earned a bachelor's degree in finance from Belmont University in 1993 after transferring from Austin Peay State University, where he played football. He also obtained a master's degree in human relations management from Cumberland University in 1995. Wells and his wife, Jennifer, have two children: Madison and K. J.

On August 28, 2022, Walt Wells was hospitalized because he suffered a cardiac episode while at work. On August 29, 2022, Chief of Staff Garry McPeek had to be named acting head coach. On August 31, 2022, Wells was released from UK Hospital.

== Head coaching record ==
Year	Team	Overall	Conference	Standing	Bowl/playoffs	STATS^{#}	Coaches^{°}
Eastern Kentucky Colonels (ASUN Conference) (2020–2022)
2020–21	Eastern Kentucky	3–6	0–0 (Note: Eastern Kentucky played only in the fall of 2020 and opted out of the conference season, which was played in spring of 2021.)				
2021	Eastern Kentucky	7–4	4–2 (Note: Conference record for the ASUN-WAC AQ7 Challenge)	T–2nd			
2022	Eastern Kentucky	7–5	3–2	T–2nd (Note: Jacksonville State finished first in the conference standings, but was ineligible for the ASUN title due to transition to the NCAA Division I Football Bowl Subdivision (FBS).)	L NCAA Division I First Round		
Eastern Kentucky Colonels (United Athletic Conference) (2023–present)
2023	Eastern Kentucky	5–6	4–2	T–2nd			
2024	Eastern Kentucky	8–5	6–2	T–2nd	L NCAA Division I First Round	21	25
2025	Eastern Kentucky	5–7	3–5	6th			
2026	Eastern Kentucky	1–3	0–0				
Eastern Kentucky:		36–36	20–13				
Total:		35–33					
National championship Conference title Conference division title or championship game berth
