= 2023 Tarleton State Texans football team =

American college football season

2023 Tarleton State Texans football
- Conference: United Athletic Conference
- Record: 8–3 (4–2 UAC)
- Head coach: Todd Whitten (14th season)
- Offensive coordinator: Mason Miller (1st season)
- Offensive scheme: Pro spread
- Defensive coordinator: Tyrone Nix (2nd season)
- Base defense: 4–3
- Home stadium: Memorial Stadium

2023 United Athletic Conference standings
	Conf.			Overall
Team	W		L	W		L
No. 18 Austin Peay $^	6	–	0	9	–	3
Central Arkansas	4	–	2	7	–	4
Southern Utah	4	–	2	6	–	5
Eastern Kentucky	4	–	2	5	–	6
Tarleton State*	4	–	2	8	–	3
Abilene Christian	3	–	3	5	–	6
North Alabama	1	–	5	3	–	8
Utah Tech*	1	–	5	2	–	9
Stephen F. Austin	0	–	6	3	–	8
$ – Conference champion; Note: Tarleton State and Utah Tech are ineligible for the UAC title and FCS postseason play due to transitions from NCAA Division II.; Rankings from STATS Poll

The 2023 Tarleton State Texans football team represented Tarleton State University as a member of the United Athletic Conference during the 2023 NCAA Division I FCS football season. Led by 14th-year head coach Todd Whitten, the Texans played home games at Memorial Stadium in Stephenville, Texas.

== Schedule ==
Date	Time	Opponent	Site	TV	Result	Attendance
September 2	7:00 p.m.	at McNeese*	Cowboy Stadium; Lake Charles, LA	ESPN+	W 52–34	12,074
September 9	6:00 p.m.	North Alabama	Memorial Stadium; Stephenville, TX	ESPN+	W 52–31	20,127
September 16	6:00 p.m.	at Texas Tech*	Jones AT&T Stadium; Lubbock, TX	ESPN+	L 3–41	56,200
September 23	6:00 p.m.	Southwest Baptist*	Memorial Stadium; Stephenville, TX	ESPN+	W 27–13	22,251
September 30	3:00 p.m.	at Southeastern Louisiana*	Strawberry Stadium; Hammond, LA	ESPN+	W 14–13	3,249
October 7	6:00 p.m.	Southern Utah	Memorial Stadium; Stephenville, TX	ESPN+	L 26–27	10,835
October 14	2:00 p.m.	at Eastern Kentucky	Roy Kidd Stadium; Richmond, KY	ESPN+	L 35–41 ^{2OT}	12,063
October 21	6:00 p.m.	Morehead State*^{†}	Memorial Stadium; Stephenville, TX	ESPN+	W 42–0	23,042
October 28	4:00 p.m.	at No. 18 Central Arkansas	Estes Stadium; Conway, AR	ESPN+	W 25–23	2,854
November 4	6:00 p.m.	Stephen F. Austin	Memorial Stadium; Stephenville, TX	ESPN+	W 59–17	17,230
November 11	2:00 p.m.	at Abilene Christian	Wildcat Stadium; Abilene, TX	ESPN+	W 31–30	6,545
*Non-conference game; ^{†}Homecoming; Rankings from STATS Poll released prior to the game; All times are in Central time
