= Brent Dearmon =

American football player and coach (born 1984)

North Alabama Lions
- Title: Head coach

Personal information
- Born: October 19, 1984 (age 42); Mobile, Alabama, U.S.

Career information
- High school: Vigor (AL)
- College: Bethel (TN)
- NFL draft: 2007: undrafted

Career history

Playing
- Evansville BlueCats (2007); Tennessee Valley Vipers (2008); San Angelo Stampede Express (2008)

Coaching
- Bethel (TN) (2007) Student assistant; Vigor HS (AL) (2008–2010) Offensive coordinator; B. C. Rain HS (AL) (2011–2012) Head coach; Auburn (2013–2014) Offensive analyst; Arkansas Tech (2015–2017) Offensive coordinator; Bethel (TN) (2018) Head coach; Kansas (2019) Senior offensive consultant; Kansas (2019–2020) Offensive coordinator & Quarterbacks coach; Middle Tennessee (2021) Offensive coordinator & Quarterbacks coach; Florida Atlantic (2022) Offensive coordinator & Quarterbacks coach; North Alabama (2023–present) Head coach

Awards and highlights
- As coach: Mid-South championship (2018)

Head coaching record
- Regular season: College: 22–30 (.423); High school: 5–15 (.250)
- Postseason: College: 0–1 (.000)
- Career: College: 22–30 (.423); High school: 5–15 (.250)

Brent Dearmon (born December 19, 1984) is an American football coach who is currently the head coach at the University of North Alabama. He was previously the offensive coordinator and quarterbacks coach at the University of Kansas, Middle Tennessee State University, and Florida Atlantic University. Dearmon was also the head coach at Bethel University in Tennessee, where he won a Mid-South Conference championship in his lone season there. He also played college football at Bethel, where he set career and single-season records in passing yards and touchdowns. Dearmon spent time playing professionally for indoor football teams before getting into coaching.

== Coaching career ==
Dearmon began his coaching career as a student assistant at his alma mater Bethel in 2007 working with the defensive backs. He was hired to be the offensive coordinator at his high school alma mater Vigor High School in Alabama, while also working at the school as a math teacher. He was named the head coach at B. C. Rain High School in Mobile in 2011, where he compiled a 5–15 record in his two seasons there before accepting an off-the-field coaching role at Auburn. He was part of a trio of high school football coaches hired as analysts at Auburn in 2013 under first-year head coach Gus Malzahn. He left Auburn in 2014 to accept the offensive coordinator position at Arkansas Tech.

=== Bethel (second stint) ===
Dearmon was named the head coach at his alma mater Bethel in 2018. In his lone season as the program's head coach, he compiled a 10–1 record and won a Mid-South conference championship.

=== Kansas ===
Dearmon left Bethel in 2019 to accept a senior offensive analyst position at Kansas under Les Miles. He was promoted to offensive coordinator and quarterbacks coach midway through the season after Les Koenning was fired.

=== Middle Tennessee State ===
Dearmon was named the offensive coordinator and quarterbacks coach at Middle Tennessee in 2021.

=== North Alabama ===
He was announced as the head coach for the University of North Alabama on December 3, 2022.

== Head coaching record ==
=== College ===
Year	Team	Overall	Conference	Standing	Bowl/playoffs	NAIA^{#}
Bethel Wildcats (Mid-South Conference) (2018)
2018	Bethel	10–1	6–0	1st	L NAIA First Round	10
Bethel:		10–1	6–0			
North Alabama Lions (United Athletic Conference) (2023–present)
2023	North Alabama	3–8	1–5	T–7th		
2024	North Alabama	3–9	3–5	T–5th		
2025	North Alabama	2–10	1–7	T–8th		
2026	North Alabama	7-4	4-2			
North Alabama:		15-31	9-19			
Total:		25-32				
National championship Conference title Conference division title or championship game berth
