= 2023 Utah Tech Trailblazers football team =

American college football season

2023 Utah Tech Trailblazers football
- Conference: United Athletic Conference
- Record: 2–9 (1–5 UAC)
- Head coach: Paul Peterson (5th season)
- Co-offensive coordinators: John Hughes (1st season); Peter Tuitupou (1st season)
- Co-defensive coordinators: Shane Hunter (2nd season); Misi Tupe (4th season)
- Home stadium: Greater Zion Stadium

2023 United Athletic Conference standings
	Conf.			Overall
Team	W		L	W		L
No. 18 Austin Peay $^	6	–	0	9	–	3
Central Arkansas	4	–	2	7	–	4
Southern Utah	4	–	2	6	–	5
Eastern Kentucky	4	–	2	5	–	6
Tarleton State*	4	–	2	8	–	3
Abilene Christian	3	–	3	5	–	6
North Alabama	1	–	5	3	–	8
Utah Tech*	1	–	5	2	–	9
Stephen F. Austin	0	–	6	3	–	8
$ – Conference champion; Note: Tarleton State and Utah Tech are ineligible for the UAC title and FCS postseason play due to transitions from NCAA Division II.; Rankings from STATS Poll

The 2023 Utah Tech Trailblazers football team represented Utah Tech University as a member of the United Athletic Conference during the 2023 NCAA Division I FCS football season. Led by fifth-year head coach Paul Peterson, the Trailblazers played their home games at Greater Zion Stadium in St. George, Utah.

== Schedule ==
Date	Time	Opponent	Site	TV	Result	Attendance
September 2	6:00 p.m.	at No. 3 Montana State*	Bobcat Stadium; Bozeman, MT	ESPN+	L 20–63	21,967
September 9	7:00 p.m.	No. 13 Montana*	Greater Zion Stadium; St. George, UT	ESPN+	L 13–43	5,766
September 16	2:00 p.m.	at Northern Arizona*	Walkup Skydome; Flagstaff, AZ	ESPN+	W 50–36	7,102
September 23	1:00 p.m.	at Missouri State*	Robert W. Plaster Stadium; Springfield, MO	ESPN+	L 14–59	11,002
September 30	5:00 p.m.	at Colorado State*	Canvas Stadium; Fort Collins, CO	MW Network	L 20–41	27,932
October 7	7:00 p.m.	Stephen F. Austin	Greater Zion Stadium; St. George, UT	ESPN+	W 37–31	10, 500
October 21	5:00 p.m.	at North Alabama	Braly Municipal Stadium; Florence, AL	ESPN+	L 30–31	8,840
October 28	6:00 p.m.	Eastern Kentucky^{†}	Greater Zion Stadium; St. George, UT	ESPN+	L 30–34	5,245
November 4	1:00 p.m.	at Abilene Christian	Wildcat Stadium; Abilene, TX	ESPN+	L 7–24	4,076
November 11	12:00 p.m.	at No. 20 Austin Peay	Fortera Stadium; Clarksville, TN	ESPN+	L 17–30	7,116
November 18	7:00 p.m.	Southern Utah	Greater Zion Stadium; St. George, UT	ESPN+	L 16–24	6,077
*Non-conference game; ^{†}Homecoming; Rankings from STATS Poll released prior to the game; All times are in Mountain time

== Game summaries ==
=== at Colorado State ===
Utah Tech Trailblazers (1–3) at Colorado State Rams (FBS) (1–2) – Game summary

Quarter	1	2	3	4	Total
Trailblazers	3	14	3	0	20
Rams (FBS)	14	7	6	14	41

at Canvas Stadium • Fort Collins, Colorado

- Date: September 30th
- Game time: 5:00 p.m. MST/4:00 p.m. PST
- Game weather: Temperature: 79 °F (26 °C) • Wind: SW at 7 miles per hour (11 km/h) • Weather: Sunny
- Game attendance: 27,932
- Referee: Christian Watson
- TV announcers (MW Network): TBD

Game information

First quarter

Second quarter

Third quarter

Fourth quarter

Statistics	Utah Tech (FCS)	Colorado State
First downs	18	25
Plays–yards	68–349	63–586
Rushes–yards	35–164	29–112
Passing yards	185	474
Passing: comp–att–int	21–33–1	27–34–2
Time of possession	34:19	25:41

Team	Category	Player	Statistics
Utah Tech (FCS)	Passing	Kobe Tracy	21/33, 185 yards, 2 TD, INT
Utah Tech (FCS)	Rushing	Ronnie Walker Jr.	20 carries, 83 yards
Utah Tech (FCS)	Receiving	Rickie Johnson	8 receptions, 69 yards
Colorado State	Passing	Brayden Fowler-Nicolosi	26/32, 462 yards, 4 TD, 2 INT
Colorado State	Rushing	Vann Schield	16 carries, 54 yards, TD
Colorado State	Receiving	Tory Horton	10 receptions, 227 yards, 3 TD
