= Eastern Kentucky Colonel Marching Band =

Marching band

Eastern Kentucky University "Pride of Kentucky" Marching Band
- School: Eastern Kentucky University
- Location: Richmond, Kentucky
- Conference: UAC
- Director: Dr. Timothy Wiggins
- Members: ~150
- Fight song: ""Hail, Hail, Eastern Maroons""
- Website: https://www.eku.edu/class/music/bands/

The Eastern Kentucky University Colonel Marching Band (Pride of Kentucky, alternatively EKUCMB) is the flagship marching band of Eastern Kentucky University, located in Richmond, Kentucky. The Pride of Kentucky performs at home football games, community performances, and select Kentucky high school marching band festivals or competitions. The Pride of Kentucky performs four to six shows during the marching band season. Any student at EKU, regardless of major, is allowed to march with the Pride of Kentucky.
