= 2023 Stephen F. Austin Lumberjacks football team =

American college football season

2023 Stephen F. Austin Lumberjacks football
- Conference: United Athletic Conference
- Record: 3–8 (0–6 UAC)
- Head coach: Colby Carthel (5th season)
- Offensive coordinator: Matt Storm (5th season)
- Offensive scheme: Spread
- Defensive coordinator: Mike Mutz (1st season)
- Base defense: 4–2–5
- Home stadium: Homer Bryce Stadium

2023 United Athletic Conference standings
	Conf.			Overall
Team	W		L	W		L
No. 18 Austin Peay $^	6	–	0	9	–	3
Central Arkansas	4	–	2	7	–	4
Southern Utah	4	–	2	6	–	5
Eastern Kentucky	4	–	2	5	–	6
Tarleton State*	4	–	2	8	–	3
Abilene Christian	3	–	3	5	–	6
North Alabama	1	–	5	3	–	8
Utah Tech*	1	–	5	2	–	9
Stephen F. Austin	0	–	6	3	–	8
$ – Conference champion; Note: Tarleton State and Utah Tech are ineligible for the UAC title and FCS postseason play due to transitions from NCAA Division II.; Rankings from STATS Poll

The 2023 Stephen F. Austin Lumberjacks football team represented Stephen F. Austin State University as a member of the United Athletic Conference during the 2023 NCAA Division I FCS football season. Led by fifth-year head coach Colby Carthel, the Lumberjacks played home games at Homer Bryce Stadium in Nacogdoches, Texas.

== Schedule ==
Date	Time	Opponent	Site	TV	Result	Attendance
September 2	6:00 p.m.	at Troy*	Veterans Memorial Stadium; Troy, AL	ESPN+	L 30–48	28,179
September 9	6:00 p.m.	Alcorn State*	Homer Bryce Stadium; Nacogdoches, TX	ESPN+	W 38–10	7,844
September 16	6:00 p.m.	at Northwestern State*	Harry Turpin Stadium; Natchitoches, LA (Chief Caddo)	ESPN+	W 41–7	6,486
September 23	6:00 p.m.	Austin Peay	Homer Bryce Stadium; Nacogdoches, TX	ESPN+	L 20–22	9,832
September 30	6:00 p.m.	Texas A&M–Commerce*	Homer Bryce Stadium; Nacogdoches, TX	ESPN+	W 56–27	7,029
October 7	8:00 p.m.	at Utah Tech	Greater Zion Stadium; St. George, UT	ESPN+	L 31–37	10,500
October 14	4:00 p.m.	at No. 20 Central Arkansas^{[note 1]}*	Estes Stadium; Conway, AR	ESPN+	L 21–24	7,137
October 21	4:00 p.m.	Abilene Christian	Homer Bryce Stadium; Nacogdoches, TX	ESPN+	L 27–34	8,961
November 4	6:00 p.m.	at Tarleton State	Memorial Stadium; Stephenville, TX	ESPN+	L 17–59	17,230
November 11	4:00 p.m.	Southern Utah	Homer Bryce Stadium; Nacogdoches, TX	ESPN+	L 17–45	6,835
November 18	2:00 p.m.	Eastern Kentucky	Roy Kidd Stadium; Richmond, KY	ESPN+	L 24–36	9,069
*Non-conference game; Rankings from STATS Poll released prior to the game; All times are in Central time

^{[note 1]}The game against Central Arkansas, a fellow member of the United Athletic Conference (UAC), was played as a non-conference game and did not count in the league standings.
