= 2023 Eastern Kentucky Colonels football team =

American college football season

2023 Eastern Kentucky Colonels football
- Conference: United Athletic Conference
- Record: 5–6 (4–2 UAC)
- Head coach: Walt Wells (4th season)
- Offensive coordinator: Andy Richman (4th season)
- Defensive coordinator: Jake Johnson (4th season)
- Home stadium: Roy Kidd Stadium

2023 United Athletic Conference standings
	Conf.			Overall
Team	W		L	W		L
No. 18 Austin Peay $^	6	–	0	9	–	3
Central Arkansas	4	–	2	7	–	4
Southern Utah	4	–	2	6	–	5
Eastern Kentucky	4	–	2	5	–	6
Tarleton State*	4	–	2	8	–	3
Abilene Christian	3	–	3	5	–	6
North Alabama	1	–	5	3	–	8
Utah Tech*	1	–	5	2	–	9
Stephen F. Austin	0	–	6	3	–	8
$ – Conference champion; Note: Tarleton State and Utah Tech are ineligible for the UAC title and FCS postseason play due to transitions from NCAA Division II.; Rankings from STATS Poll

The 2023 Eastern Kentucky Colonels football team represented Eastern Kentucky University as a member of the United Athletic Conference during the 2023 NCAA Division I FCS football season. Led by fourth-year head coach Walt Wells, the Colonels played home games at Roy Kidd Stadium in Richmond, Kentucky. The Eastern Kentucky Colonels football team drew an average home attendance of 11,655 in 2023.

After the 2022 season, the ASUN and the Western Athletic Conference (WAC), which had been partners in a football-only alliance in the 2021 and 2022 seasons, jointly announced that they would merge their football leagues.

== Schedule ==
Date	Time	Opponent	Rank	Site	TV	Result	Attendance
September 2	3:30 p.m.	at Cincinnati*	No. 24	Nippert Stadium; Cincinnati, OH	ESPN+	L 13–66	38,193
September 9	3:00 p.m.	at Kentucky*		Kroger Field; Lexington, KY	SECN+/ESPN+	L 17–28	61,876
September 16	6:00 p.m.	Western Carolina*		Roy Kidd Stadium; Richmond, KY	ESPN+	L 24–27	13,596
September 23	6:00 p.m.	No. 16 Southeast Missouri State*		Roy Kidd Stadium; Richmond, KY	ESPN+	W 41–38	13,477
September 30	7:00 p.m.	at North Alabama		Braly Municipal Stadium; Florence, AL	ESPN+	W 32–22	11,430
October 14	3:00 p.m.	Tarleton State^{†}		Roy Kidd Stadium; Richmond, KY	ESPN+	W 41–35 ^{2OT}	12,063
October 21	6:00 p.m.	at Gardner–Webb*		Ernest W. Spangler Stadium; Boiling Springs, NC	ESPN+	L 32–35	4,339
October 28	8:00 p.m.	at Utah Tech		Greater Zion Stadium; St. George, UT	ESPN+	W 34–30	5,245
November 4	5:00 p.m.	No. 19 Austin Peay		Roy Kidd Stadium; Richmond, KY	ESPN+	L 30–33 ^{OT}	10,067
November 11	5:00 p.m.	at Central Arkansas		Estes Stadium; Conway, AR	ESPN+	L 24–27	5,423
November 18	2:00 p.m.	Stephen F. Austin		Roy Kidd Stadium; Richmond, KY	ESPN+	W 36–24	9,069
*Non-conference game; ^{†}Homecoming; Rankings from STATS Poll released prior to the game; All times are in Eastern time

== Game summaries ==
=== at Cincinnati ===
Game One – No. 24 Eastern Kentucky Colonels (0-0) at Cincinnati Bearcats (0-0)

Quarter	1	2	3	4	Total
No. 24 Colonels	0	7	3	3	13
Bearcats	21	21	10	14	66

at Nippert Stadium • Cincinnati, Ohio

- Date: Saturday, September 2, 2023
- Game time: 3:30 p.m. EDT
- Game weather: Sunny • Temperature: 89 °F (32 °C) • Wind: 7 mph
- Game attendance: 38,193
- Referee: Christian Watson
- TV announcers (ESPN+): Noah Reed (play-by-play), Ryan Leaf (analyst), and Shane Sparks (sideline)
- ESPN

Game information

First quarter

- 11:45 CIN - Xzavier Henderson 49-yard pass from Emory Jones (Carter Brown kick) - 7-0 Cincinnati, Drive: 7 plays, 71 yards, 3:09
- 6:52 CIN - Dee Wiggins 39-yard pass from Emory Jones (Carter Brown kick) - 14-0 Cincinnati, Drive: 5 plays, 87 yards, 2:07
- 1:41 CIN - Emory Jones 1-yard run (Carter Brown kick) - 21-0 Cincinnati, Drive: 9 plays, 80 yards, 3:46

Second quarter

- 11:47 CIN - Payten Singletary 1-yard pass from Emory Jones (Carter Brown kick) - 28-0 Cincinnati, Drive: 4 plays, 77 yards, 1:23
- 7:17 CIN - Emory Jones 12-yard run (Carter Brown kick) - 35-0 Cincinnati, Drive: 8 plays, 65 yards, 3:04
- 5:08 EKU - Hunter Brown 17-yard pass from Parker McKinney (Patrick Nations kick) - 35-7 Cincinnati, Drive: 4 plays, 74 yards, 2:03
- 0:49 CIN - Braden Smith 48-yard pass from Emory Jones (Carter Brown kick) - 42-7 Cincinnati, Drive: 10 plays, 84 yards, 4:14

Third quarter

- 13:21 CIN - Carter Brown 46-yard field goal - 45-7 Cincinnati, Drive: 4 plays, -9 yards, 1:27
- 8:12 EKU - Patrick Nations 42-yard field goal - 45-10 Cincinnati, Drive: 4 plays, -7 yards, 1:44
- 2:42 CIN - Aaron Turner 6-yard pass from Emory Jones (Carter Brown kick) - 52-10 Cincinnati, Drive: 11 plays, 75 yards, 5:30

Fourth quarter

- 13:39 CIN - Brady Lichtenberg 4-yard run (Carter Brown kick) - 59-10 Cincinnati, Drive: 6 plays, 37 yards, 2:39
- 6:30 EKU - Patrick Nations 43-yard field goal - 59-13 Cincinnati, Drive: 13 plays, 49 yards, 7:09
- 4:37 CIN - Barry Jackson Jr. 65-yard pass from Brady Lichtenberg - 66-13 Cincinnati, Drive: 4 plays, 75 yards, 1:53

Statistics	EKU	CIN
First downs	15	30
Plays–yards	55–302	71–667
Rushes–yards	32–125	44–229
Passing yards	177	438
Passing: comp–att–int	13–25–2	23–27–0
Turnovers		
Time of possession	28:14	31:46

Team	Category	Player	Statistics
Eastern Kentucky	Passing	Patrick McKinney	13/24, 177 yards, 1 TD, 2 INT
Eastern Kentucky	Rushing	Joshua Carter	7 carries, 68 yards
Eastern Kentucky	Receiving	Jaden Smith	5 receptions, 81 yards
Cincinnati	Passing	Emory Jones	19/23, 345 yards, 5 TD
Cincinnati	Rushing	Corey Kiner	13 carries, 105 yards
Cincinnati	Receiving	Xzavier Henderson	7 receptions, 149 yards, 1 TD

=== at Kentucky ===
Game Two – Eastern Kentucky Colonels (0–1) at Kentucky Wildcats (1–0) – Game summary

Quarter	1	2	3	4	Total
Colonels	7	0	3	7	17
Wildcats	0	7	14	7	28

at Kroger Field • Lexington, KY

- Date: Saturday, September 9, 2023
- Game time: 3:00 p.m. EST
- Game weather: Cloudy • Temperature: 72 °F (22 °C) • Wind: NE 12 miles per hour (19 km/h)
- Game attendance: 61,876
- Referee: Ken Williamson
- TV announcers (SECN+): Peter Sousa (play-by-play), Takeo Spikes (analyst)

Game information

First quarter

- (10:46) EKU – Parker McKinney 14-yard run (Patrick Nations kick) (Drive: 6 plays, 30 yards, 2:32; Eastern Kentucky 7-0)

Second quarter

- (0:42) UK – Tayvion Robinson 24-yard pass from Devin Leary (Alex Raynor kick) (Drive: 1 play, 24 yards, 0:06; Tied 7-7)

Third quarter

- (9:41) EKU – Patrick Nations 21-yard field goal (Drive: 10 plays, 71 yards, 5:19; Eastern Kentucky 10-7)
- (5:47) UK – Tayvion Robinson 6-yard pass from Devin Leary (Alex Raynor kick) (Drive: 9 plays, 72 yards, 3:54; Kentucky 14-10)
- (1:47) UK – Barion Brown 13-yard pass from Devin Leary (Alex Raynor kick) (Drive: 4 plays, 85 yards, 2:00; Kentucky 21-10)

Fourth quarter

- (12:04) EKU – Braedon Sloan 9-yard pass from Parker McKinney (Patrick Nations kick) (Drive: 9 plays, 75 yards, 4:43; Kentucky 21-17)
- (8:08) UK – Ray Davis 24-yard pass from Devin Leary (Alex Raynor kick) (Drive: 6 plays, 65 yards, 3:49; Kentucky 28-17)

Statistics	EKU	UK
First downs	15	20
Total yards	56–311	61–414
Rushing yards	27–92	23–115
Passing yards	219	299
Passing: Comp–Att–Int	19–29–1	24–38–1
Time of possession	27:53	32:07

Team	Category	Player	Statistics
Eastern Kentucky	Passing	Parker McKinney	19/29, 219 yards, TD, INT
Eastern Kentucky	Rushing	Braedon Sloan	7 carries, 48 yards
Eastern Kentucky	Receiving	Bryant Johnson	2 receptions, 53 yards
Kentucky	Passing	Devin Leary	24/38, 299 yards, 4 TD, INT
Kentucky	Rushing	Ray Davis	12 carries, 52 yards
Kentucky	Receiving	Tayvion Robinson	6 receptions, 136 yards, 2 TD
