= 2023 Central Arkansas Bears football team =

American college football season

2023 Central Arkansas Bears football
- Conference: United Athletic Conference
- Record: 7–4 (4–2 UAC)
- Head coach: Nathan Brown (6th season)
- Offensive coordinator: Ken Collums (6th season)
- Offensive scheme: Spread
- Defensive coordinator: Matt Kitchens (3rd season)
- Base defense: 4–3
- Home stadium: Estes Stadium

2023 United Athletic Conference standings
	Conf.			Overall
Team	W		L	W		L
No. 18 Austin Peay $^	6	–	0	9	–	3
Central Arkansas	4	–	2	7	–	4
Southern Utah	4	–	2	6	–	5
Eastern Kentucky	4	–	2	5	–	6
Tarleton State*	4	–	2	8	–	3
Abilene Christian	3	–	3	5	–	6
North Alabama	1	–	5	3	–	8
Utah Tech*	1	–	5	2	–	9
Stephen F. Austin	0	–	6	3	–	8
$ – Conference champion; Note: Tarleton State and Utah Tech are ineligible for the UAC title and FCS postseason play due to transitions from NCAA Division II.; Rankings from STATS Poll

The 2023 Central Arkansas Bears football team represented the University of Central Arkansas as a member of the United Athletic Conference during the 2023 NCAA Division I FCS football season. The Bears were led by sixth-year head coach Nathan Brown and played their home games at Estes Stadium in Conway, Arkansas.

== Schedule ==
Date	Time	Opponent	Rank	Site	TV	Result	Attendance
September 2	6:00 p.m.	at Oklahoma State*		Boone Pickens Stadium; Stillwater, OK	ESPN+	L 13–27	53,855
September 9	6:00 p.m.	Texas College*		Estes Stadium; Conway, AR	ESPN+	W 70–2	8,759
September 16	2:30 p.m.	at No. 2 North Dakota State*		Fargodome; Fargo, ND	ESPN+	L 31–49	15,016
September 23	6:00 p.m.	Abilene Christian		Estes Stadium; Conway, AR	ESPN+	W 52–17	8,657
September 30	7:00 p.m.	at Southern Utah	No. 25	Eccles Coliseum; Cedar City, UT	ESPN+	W 29–27	4,013
October 7	4:00 p.m.	Southeast Missouri State*	No. 23	Estes Stadium; Conway, AR	ESPN+	W 38–33	9,457
October 14	4:00 p.m	Stephen F. Austin^{[note 1]}*	No. 20	Estes Stadium; Conway, AR	ESPN+	W 24–21	7,137
October 28	4:00 p.m.	Tarleton State^{†}	No. 18	Estes Stadium; Conway, AR	ESPN+	L 23–25	2,854
November 4	5:00 p.m.	at North Alabama		Braly Municipal Stadium; Florence, AL	ESPN+	W 27–14	9,003
November 11	4:00 p.m.	Eastern Kentucky		Estes Stadium; Conway, AR	ESPN+	W 27–24	5,423
November 18	1:00 p.m.	at No. 15 Austin Peay		Fortera Stadium; Clarksville, TN	ESPN+	L 12–14	9,931
*Non-conference game; ^{†}Homecoming; Rankings from STATS Poll released prior to the game; All times are in Central time

^{[note 1]}The game against Stephen F. Austin, a fellow member of the United Athletic Conference (UAC), was played as a non-conference game and did not count in the league standings.

== Game summaries ==
=== at Oklahoma State ===
Central Arkansas Bears at Oklahoma State Cowboys – Game summary

Quarter	1	2	3	4	Total
Bears	0	0	7	6	13
Cowboys	7	6	0	14	27

at Boone Pickens Stadium, Stillwater, Oklahoma

- Date: September 2
- Game time: 6:00 p.m. CDT
- Game weather: Sunny, 92 °F (33 °C)
- Game attendance: 53,855
- Referee: Michael VanderVelde
- TV announcers (ESPN+): Matt Schumacker (play-by-play) & Brad Hopkins (analyst)

Game information

First quarter

- OKST – Brennan Presley 11-yard pass from Garrett Rangel (Alex Hale kick), 2:58. Cowboys 7–0. Drive: 9 plays, 80 yards, 2:47.

Second quarter

- OKST – Alex Hale 36-yard field goal, 5:34. Cowboys 10–0. Drive: 11 plays, 31 yards, 3:59.
- OKST – Alex Hale 45-yard field goal, 0:00. Cowboys 13–0. Drive: 4 plays, 0 yards, 0:20.

Third quarter

- UCA – Kylin James 1-yard pass from Will McElvain (Jake Gaster kick), 4:37. Cowboys 13–7. Drive: 8 plays, 95 yards, 3:39.

Fourth quarter

- OKST – Elijah Collins 17-yard run (Alex Hale kick), 10:44. Cowboys 20–7. Drive: 9 plays, 93 yards, 3:57.
- OKST – Ollie Gordon II 2-yard run (Alex Hale kick), 5:54. Cowboys 27–7. Drive: 6 plays, 78 yards, 2:41.
- UCA – Christian Richmond 2-yard pass from Will McElvain (kick failed), 3:28. Cowboys 27–13. Drive: 7 plays, 70 yards, 2:26.

Statistics	UCA	OKST
First downs	19	24
Total yards	391	453
Rushes/yards	28/123	31/149
Passing yards	268	304
Passing: Comp–Att–Int	24–37	30–48–1
Time of possession	27:30	30:35

Team	Category	Player	Statistics
Central Arkansas	Passing	Will McElvain	24/37, 268 yards, 2 TD
Central Arkansas	Rushing	ShunDerrick Powell	12 carries, 71 yards
Central Arkansas	Receiving	Christian Richmond	5 receptions, 38 yards, TD
Oklahoma State	Passing	Garret Rangel	10/15, 118 yards, TD, INT
Oklahoma State	Rushing	Ollie Gordon II	7 carries, 44 yards, TD
Oklahoma State	Receiving	Brennan Presley	6 receptions, 54 yards, TD

=== at No. 2 North Dakota State ===
Central Arkansas Bears (1–1) vs No. 2 North Dakota State Bison (2–0)

Quarter	1	2	3	4	Total
Bears	7	10	0	14	31
No. 2 Bison	21	14	7	7	49

at Fargodome, Fargo, ND

- Date: September 16, 2023
- Game time: 2:30 p.m. (CT)
- Game weather: Indoors; 70 °F (21 °C)
- Game attendance: 15,016
- Referee: CJ Jackson
- TV: ESPN+

Statistics	Central Arkansas	North Dakota State
First downs	18	26
Plays–yards	58–431	62–481
Rushes–yards	27–221	40–235
Passing yards	210	246
Passing: comp–att–int	22–31–1	20–22–0
Time of possession	25:25	34:35

Team	Category	Player	Statistics
Central Arkansas	Passing	Will McElvain	22/31, 210 yds, TD, INT
Central Arkansas	Rushing	ShunDerrick Powell	18 car, 218 yds, 2 TD
Central Arkansas	Receiving	Myles Butler	6 rec, 88 yds, TD
North Dakota State	Passing	Cam Miller	18/19, 200 yds, 2 TD
North Dakota State	Rushing	TaMerik Williams	13 car, 83 yds, TD
North Dakota State	Receiving	Eli Green	4 rec, 86 yds

Scoring summary

Quarter	Time	Drive			Team	Scoring information	Score	
Quarter	Time	Plays	Yards	TOP	Team	Scoring information	UCA	NDSU
1st	12:33	5	81	2:22	NDSU	Cam Miller (#7) 1-yard touchdown run, Griffin Crosa (#39) kick good	0	7
1st	6:51				NDSU	Interception returned 35 yards for touchdown by Eli Mostaert (#53), Grffin Crosa (#39) kick good	0	14
1st	5:25	3	75	1:26	UCA	ShunDerrick Powell (#27) 43-yard touchdown run, Jake Gaster (#22) kick good	7	14
1st	2:45	5	66	2:33	NDSU	TK Marshall (#28) 11-yard touchdown reception from Cam Miller (#7), Griffin Crosa (#39) kick good	7	21
2nd	12:03	12	58	5:42	UCA	35-yard field goal by Jake Gaster (#22)	10	21
2nd	7:07	8	78	4:50	NDSU	Hunter Brozio (#49) 6-yard touchdown reception from Cam Miller (#7), Griffin Crosa (#39) kick good	10	28
2nd	6:24	2	75	0:43	UCA	ShunDerrick Powell (#27) 71-yard touchdown run, Jake Gaster kick good	17	28
2nd	1:41	9	75	4:43	NDSU	Cole Payton (#9) 26-yard touchdown run, Grffin Crosa (#39) kick good	17	35
3rd	7:46	9	49	5:26	NDSU	Cam Miller (#7) 13-yard touchdown run, Griffin Crosa (#39) kick good	17	42
4th	13:11	14	81	7:47	NDSU	TaMerik Williams (#22) 8-yard touchdown run, Griffin Crosa (#39) kick good	17	49
4th	6:53	14	75	6:18	UCA	Myles Butler (#14) 4-yard touchdown reception from Will McElvain (#2), Jake Gaster (#22) kick good	24	49
4th	2:16	7	69	2:51	UCA	Darius Hale (#4) 10-yard touchdown run, Jake Gaster (#22) kick good	31	49
"TOP" = time of possession. For other American football terms, see Glossary of American football.							31	49
