= 2023 Austin Peay Governors football team =

American college football season

2023 Austin Peay Governors football

UAC champion

NCAA Division I First Round, L 21–24 vs. Chattanooga
- Conference: United Athletic Conference

Ranking
- STATS: No. 13
- FCS Coaches: No. 10
- Record: 9–3 (6–0 UAC)
- Head coach: Scotty Walden (4th season)
- Co-offensive coordinators: Jared Kaster (1st season); Lanear Sampson (1st season)
- Co-defensive coordinators: J. J. Clark (1st season); Chris Jones (1st season)
- Home stadium: Fortera Stadium

2023 United Athletic Conference standings
	Conf.			Overall
Team	W		L	W		L
No. 18 Austin Peay $^	6	–	0	9	–	3
Central Arkansas	4	–	2	7	–	4
Southern Utah	4	–	2	6	–	5
Eastern Kentucky	4	–	2	5	–	6
Tarleton State*	4	–	2	8	–	3
Abilene Christian	3	–	3	5	–	6
North Alabama	1	–	5	3	–	8
Utah Tech*	1	–	5	2	–	9
Stephen F. Austin	0	–	6	3	–	8
$ – Conference champion; Note: Tarleton State and Utah Tech are ineligible for the UAC title and FCS postseason play due to transitions from NCAA Division II.; Rankings from STATS Poll

The 2023 Austin Peay Governors football team represented Austin Peay State University as a member of the United Athletic Conference during the 2023 NCAA Division I FCS football season. Led by fourth-year head coach Scotty Walden, the Governors played at Fortera Stadium in Clarksville, Tennessee.

After the 2022 season, the ASUN and the Western Athletic Conference (WAC), which had been partners in a football-only alliance in the 2021 and 2022 seasons, jointly announced that they would merge their football leagues.

== Schedule ==
Date	Time	Opponent	Rank	Site	TV	Result	Attendance
September 2	6:00 p.m.	at Southern Illinois*		Saluki Stadium; Carbondale, IL	ESPN+	L 23–49	8,327
September 9	4:00 p.m.	at No. 9 (FBS) Tennessee*		Neyland Stadium; Knoxville, TN	SECN+	L 13–30	101,915
September 16	6:00 p.m.	East Tennessee State*		Fortera Stadium; Clarksville, TN	ESPN+	W 63–3	8,296
September 23	6:00 p.m.	at Stephen F. Austin		Homer Bryce Stadium; Nacogdoches, TX	ESPN+	W 22–20	9,832
September 30	1:00 p.m.	at Lindenwood*		Harlen C. Hunter Stadium; St. Charles, MO	ESPN+	W 52–10	2,816
October 14	1:00 p.m.	Gardner–Webb*		Fortera Stadium; Clarksville, TN	ESPN+	W 41–14	7,503
October 21	7:00 p.m.	at Southern Utah	No. 24	Eccles Coliseum; Cedar City, UT	ESPN+	W 48–45 ^{2OT}	3,547
October 28	3:00 p.m.	North Alabama^{†}	No. 20	Fortera Stadium; Clarksville, TN	ESPN+	W 49–39	8,698
November 4	4:00 p.m.	at Eastern Kentucky	No. 19	Roy Kidd Stadium; Richmond, KY	ESPN+	W 33–30 ^{OT}	10,067
November 11	1:00 p.m.	Utah Tech	No. 20	Fortera Stadium; Clarksville, TN	ESPN+	W 30–17	7,116
November 18	1:00 p.m.	Central Arkansas	No. 15	Fortera Stadium; Clarksville, TN	ESPN+	W 14–12	9,931
November 25	2:00 p.m.	No. 18 Chattanooga*	No. 13	Fortera Stadium; Clarksville, TN (NCAA Division I First Round)	ESPN+	L 21–24	7,249
*Non-conference game; ^{†}Homecoming; Rankings from STATS Poll released prior to the game; All times are in Central time

== Game summaries ==
=== at No. 12 Tennessee ===
Game Two – Austin Peay Governors (0-1) at No. 12 (FBS) Tennessee Volunteers (1-0) – Game summary

Quarter	1	2	3	4	Total
Austin Peay	3	3	0	7	13
No. 12 Tennessee (FBS)	3	10	10	7	30

at Neyland Stadium • Knoxville, Tennessee

- Date: Saturday, September 9, 2023
- Game time: 5:30 p.m. EST
- Game weather: Cloudy, 78 °F (26 °C)
- Game attendance: 101,915
- Referee: Steve Marlowe
- TV announcers (SECN+/ESPN+): Justin Kutcher (play-by-play), Dave Steckel (analyst)

Game information

First quarter

- (11:06) PEAY — Maddux Trujillo 45-yard field goal (Drive: 8 plays, 48 yards, 3:54; Austin Peay 3-0)
- (5:51) TENN – Charles Campbell 28-yard field goal (Drive: 4 plays, 2 yards, 1:01; Tied 3-3)

Second quarter

- (8:15) PEAY – Maddux Trujillo 34-yard field goal (Drive: 12 plays, 67 yards, 6:39; Austin Peay 6-3)
- (4:55) TENN – Charles Campbell 37-yard field goal (Drive: 8 plays, 65 yards, 3:11; Tied 6-6)
- (0:15) TENN – Joe Milton III 6-yard run (Charles Campbell kick) (Drive: 11 plays, 67 yards, 2:04; Tennessee 13-6)

Third quarter

- (13:30) TENN – Ramel Keyton 5-yard pass from Joe Milton III (Charles Campbell kick) (Drive: 5 plays, 66 yards, 1:21; Tennessee 20-6)
- (6:33) TENN – Charles Campbell 22-yard field goal (Drive: 8 plays, 44 yards, 2:30; Tennessee 23-6)

Fourth quarter

- (9:01) PEAY – Trey Goodman 52-yard pass from Mike DiLiello (Maddux Trujillo kick) (Drive: 6 plays, 90 yards, 2:30; Tennessee 23-13)
- (8:03) TENN – McCallan Castles 43-yard pass from Joe Milton III (Charles Campbell kick) (Drive: 4 plays, 75 yards, 0:58; Tennessee 30-13)

Statistics	PEAY	TENN
First downs	19	17
Total yards	75–339	65–456
Rushing yards	34–79	32–228
Passing yards	260	228
Passing: Comp–Att–Int	29–41–1	21–33–0
Time of possession	39:01	20:44

Team	Category	Player	Statistics
Austin Peay	Passing	Mike DiLiello	29/39, 260 yards, TD, INT
Austin Peay	Rushing	Mike DiLiello	21 carries, 36 yards
Austin Peay	Receiving	Trey Goodman	3 receptions, 70 yards, TD
Tennessee	Passing	Joe Milton III	21/33, 228 yards, 2 TD
Tennessee	Rushing	Jaylen Wright	13 carries, 118 yards
Tennessee	Receiving	Ramel Keyton	5 receptions, 52 yards, TD

=== Gardner–Webb ===
	1	2	3	4	Total
Runnin' Bulldogs	7	0	7	0	14
Governors	7	6	14	14	41

=== North Alabama ===
Team	1	2	3	4	Total
North Alabama	6	12	8	13	39
• Austin Peay	17	22	7	3	49

- Date: October 28
- Location: Fortera Stadium
- Game start: 3:03 p.m.
- Game attendance: 8,698
- Game weather: 78, Cloudy, Wind N @ 8 mph
- Referee: Zach Erdmann
- Television network: ESPN+

Statistics	AP	UNA
First downs	23	20
Total yards	520	408
Rushing yards	167	57
Passing yards	353	351
Turnovers	0	0
Time of possession	34:39	25:11

Team	Category	Player	Statistics
AP	Passing	Mike DiLiello	20/25, 353 yards, 6 TD's
AP	Rushing	Jevon Jackson	30 carries, 160 yards
AP	Receiving	Trey Goodman	5 receptions, 129 yards, 1 TD
UNA	Passing	Noah Walters	29/52, 351 yards, 5 TD's
UNA	Rushing	Noah Walters	9 carries, 31 yards, 1 TD
UNA	Receiving	Dakota Warfield	7 receptions, 88 yards

=== Chattanooga–NCAA Division I First Round ===
	1	2	3	4	Total
No. 18 Mocs	7	14	0	3	24
No. 13 Governors	7	0	14	0	21

The Governors, won the UAC Conference Title outright receiving the automatic bid for the postseason tournament, with a first-round pairing against Chattanooga.
