= Bobcat Stadium =

Bobcat Stadium may refer to:

- Bobcat Stadium (Montana State University), in Bozeman, Montana
- Bobcat Stadium (Texas State), in San Marcos, Texas

== See also ==
- Wildcat Stadium (disambiguation)
