= 2023 Abilene Christian Wildcats football team =

American college football season

2023 Abilene Christian Wildcats football
- Conference: United Athletic Conference
- Record: 5–6 (3–3 UAC)
- Head coach: Keith Patterson (2nd season)
- Offensive coordinator: Ryan Pugh (1st season)
- Offensive scheme: Air raid
- Defensive coordinator: Skyler Cassity (2nd season)
- Base defense: 3–4
- Home stadium: Anthony Field at Wildcat Stadium

2023 United Athletic Conference standings
	Conf.			Overall
Team	W		L	W		L
No. 18 Austin Peay $^	6	–	0	9	–	3
Central Arkansas	4	–	2	7	–	4
Southern Utah	4	–	2	6	–	5
Eastern Kentucky	4	–	2	5	–	6
Tarleton State*	4	–	2	8	–	3
Abilene Christian	3	–	3	5	–	6
North Alabama	1	–	5	3	–	8
Utah Tech*	1	–	5	2	–	9
Stephen F. Austin	0	–	6	3	–	8
$ – Conference champion; Note: Tarleton State and Utah Tech are ineligible for the UAC title and FCS postseason play due to transitions from NCAA Division II.; Rankings from STATS Poll

The 2023 Abilene Christian Wildcats football team represented Abilene Christian University as a member of the United Athletic Conference (UAC) during the 2023 NCAA Division I FCS football season. Led by second-year head coach Keith Patterson, the Wildcats played home games at Anthony Field at Wildcat Stadium in Abilene, Texas.

After the 2022 season concluded, the ASUN and the Western Athletic Conference (WAC), which had been partners in a football-only alliance during the 2021 and 2022 seasons, together announced that they would combine their football leagues. The new conference's permanent name of United Athletic Conference was officially announced on April 17, 2023.

== Schedule ==
Date	Time	Opponent	Site	TV	Result	Attendance
August 31	7:00 p.m.	Northern Colorado*	Wildcat Stadium; Abilene, TX	ESPN+	W 31–11	6,164
September 9	6:00 p.m.	at Prairie View A&M*	Panther Stadium; Prairie View, TX		W 45–16	5,774
September 16	7:00 p.m.	No. 10 Incarnate Word*	Wildcat Stadium; Abilene, TX	ESPN+	L 20–27	8,280
September 23	7:00 p.m.	at Central Arkansas	Estes Stadium; Conway, AR	ESPN+	L 17–52	8,657
September 30	6:00 p.m.	at North Texas*	DATCU Stadium; Denton, TX	ESPN+	L 31–45	21,494
October 14	3:00 p.m.	North Alabama^{†}	Wildcat Stadium; Abilene, TX	ESPN+	W 30–13	10,383
October 21	4:00 p.m.	at Stephen F. Austin	Homer Bryce Stadium; Nacogdoches, TX	ESPN+	W 34–27	8,961
October 28	2:00 p.m.	at Southern Utah	Eccles Coliseum; Cedar City, UT	ESPN+	L 14–52	2,969
November 4	2:00 p.m.	Utah Tech	Wildcat Stadium; Abilene, TX	ESPN+	W 24–7	4,076
November 11	2:00 p.m.	Tarleton State	Wildcat Stadium; Abilene, TX	ESPN+	L 30–31	6,545
November 18	11:00 a.m.	at Texas A&M*	Kyle Field; College Station, TX	SECN+/ESPN+	L 10–38	94,974
*Non-conference game; ^{†}Homecoming; Rankings from STATS Poll released prior to the game; All times are in Central time

== Game summaries ==
=== No. 10 Incarnate Word ===
No. 10 Incarnate Word Cardinals at Abilene Christian Wildcats – Game summary

Quarter	1	2	3	4	Total
No. 10 Cardinals	0	10	0	17	27
Wildcats	0	10	0	10	20

at Anthony Field at Wildcat Stadium, Abilene, Texas

- Date: September 16
- Game time: 7:00 p.m. CDT
- Game weather: Temperature: 82 °F (28 °C) • Wind: W 2 miles per hour (3.2 km/h) • Weather: Sunny
- Game attendance: 8,280
- Referee: John Kellermeier
- TV announcers (ESPN+): Zach Carlyle (play-by-play), Joseph Chapa (analyst) and Kauy Ostlien (sideline)
- Box Score

Game information

First Quarter

- No scoring plays

Second Quarter

- ACU – 4:16 Jeremiah Dobbins 29 yard run, Kyle Ramsey kick
  ACU 7–0 Drive: 8 plays, 80 yards, 4:41
- UIW – 3:29 Zach Calzada 52 yard run, Mason Lawler kick
  Tied 7–7 Drive: 4 plays, 75 yards, 0:47
- ACU – 0:31 Kyle Ramsey 51 yard field goal
  ACU 10–7 Drive: 5 plays, 39 yards, 1:35
- UIW – 0:00 Mason Lawler 43 yard field goal
  Tied 10–10 Drive: 3 plays, 49 yards, 0:31

Third Quarter

- No scoring plays

Fourth Quarter

- UIW – 14:50 Brandon Porter 23 yard pass from Zach Calzada, Mason Lawler kick
  UIW 17–10 Drive: 5 plays, 64 yards, 1:24
- UIW – 10:06 Zach Calzada 1 yard run, Mason Lawler kick
  UIW 24–10 Drive: 8 plays, 70 yards, 4:20
- ACU – 8:26 Jay'Veon Sunday 1 yard run, Kyle Ramsey kick
  UIW 24–17 Drive: 7 plays, 75 yards, 1:34
- UIW – 5:18 Mason Lawler 27 yard field goal
  UIW 27–17 Drive: 7 plays, 56 yards, 3:01
- ACU – 2:45 Kyle Ramsey 44 yard field goal
  UIW 27–20 Drive: 9 plays, 56 yards, 2:27

Statistics	UIW	ACU
First downs	21	19
Plays–yards	67–517	67–320
Rushes–yards	31–144	35–131
Passing yards	373	189
Passing: comp–att–int	23–36–1	15–32–1
Turnovers		
Time of possession	28:01	31:59

Team	Category	Player	Statistics
Incarnate Word	Passing	Zach Calzada	23/36, 373 yards, 1 TD, 1 INT
Incarnate Word	Rushing	Zach Calzada	7 carries, 66 yards, 2 TD
Incarnate Word	Receiving	Brandon Porter	10 receptions, 201 yards, 1 TD
Abilene Christian	Passing	Maverick McIvor	15/32, 189 yards, 1 INT
Abilene Christian	Rushing	Jeremiah Dobbins	21 carries, 106 yards, 1 TD
Abilene Christian	Receiving	Cooper McCasland	4 receptions, 64 yards

=== at Texas A&M ===
Abilene Christian Wildcats at Texas A&M Aggies – Game summary

Quarter	1	2	3	4	Total
Wildcats	7	0	0	3	10
Aggies	7	10	7	14	38

at Kyle Field, College Station, Texas

- Date: November 18
- Game time: 11 a.m. CST
- Game weather: Cloudy • Temperature: 67 °F (19 °C) • Wind: NE 8 miles per hour (13 km/h)
- Game attendance: 94,794
- Referee: Steve Marlowe
- TV announcers (SECN+/ESPN+): Courtney Lyle, Hutson Mason, and Ashley Stroehlein

Game information

First quarter

- ACU – Cirby Coheley 51-yard interception (Grant Nickel kick), 13:04. Wildcats 7–0.
- TAMU – Rueben Owens 7-yard run (Randy Bond kick), 10:20. Tied 7–7. Drive: 6 plays, 75 yards, 2:44.

Second quarter

- TAMU – Randy Bond 34-yard field goal, 7:59. Aggies 10–7. Drive: 6 plays, 33 yards, 2:04.
- TAMU – Noah Thomas 13-yard pass from Jaylen Henderson (Randy Bond kick), 3:26. Aggies 17–7. Drive: 10 plays, 75 yards, 3:37.

Third quarter

- TAMU – Moose Muhammad III 49-yard pass from Jaylen Henderson (Randy Bond kick), 12:39. Aggies 24–7. Drive: 6 plays, 74 yards, 2:14.

Fourth quarter

- ACU – Kyle Ramsey 40-yard field goal, 14:06. Aggies 24–10. Drive: 13 plays, 67 yards, 7:02.
- TAMU – David Bailey 3-yard run (Randy Bond kick), 5:25. Aggies 31–10. Drive: 12 plays, 73 yards, 5:35.
- TAMU – Jaden Platt 13-yard pass from Marcel Reed (Randy Bond kick), 0:56. Aggies 38–10. Drive: 4 plays, 63 yards, 1:33.

Statistics	ACU	TXAM
First downs	12	25
Total yards	242	448
Rushing yards	93	175
Passing yards	149	273
Passing: Comp–Att–Int	19–34–0	17–24–1
Time of possession	30:46	29:14

Team	Category	Player	Statistics
Abilene Christian	Passing	Maverick McIvor	19/34, 149 yards
Abilene Christian	Rushing	Jay'Veon Sunday	18 rushes, 87 yards
Abilene Christian	Receiving	Blayne Taylor	7 receptions, 77 yards
Texas A&M	Passing	Jaylen Henderson	16/23, 260 yards, 2 TD, 1 INT
Texas A&M	Rushing	Rueben Owens	18 rushes, 106 yards
Texas A&M	Receiving	Moose Muhammad III	4 receptions, 104 yards, 1 TD
