= John Kelling (American football) =

American football coach (born c. 1970)

Current position
- Title: Associate head coach & linebackers coach
- Team: Southern Utah
- Conference: UAC

Biographical details
- Born: c. 1970 (age 55–56); Rochester, Minnesota, U.S.
- Education: Mankato State University (1994)

Playing career
- 1988–1991: Mankato State
- Position: Safety

Coaching career (HC unless noted)
- 1992–1993: Mankato State (SA)
- 1994–1995: Mankato State (GA)
- 1996–1998: Augustana (SD) (DB/S&C)
- 1999–2003: Augustana (SD) (WR/S&C)
- 2004–2005: North Dakota (DB)
- 2006–2011: North Dakota (co-DC/DB)
- 2012–2013: Mary (assoc. HC/DC)
- 2014–2019: Frostburg State (DC/LB)
- 2020–2021: Lock Haven
- 2022–2025: Southern Utah (assoc. HC/DC/LB)
- 2026–present: Southern Utah (assoc. HC/LB/RGC)

Head coaching record
- Overall: 1–10

Accomplishments and honors

Awards
- Minnesota State Hall of Fame (2004); First-team All-NCC (1990–1991); Second-team All-NCC (1989)

John Arthur Kelling (born c. 1970) is an American college football coach. He is the associate head football coach and linebackers coach for Southern Utah University, positions he has held since 2022. He was the head football coach for Lock Haven University from 2020 to 2021. He also coached for Mankato State, Augustana (SD), North Dakota, Mary, and Frostburg State. He played college football for Mankato State as a safety.

== Playing career ==
Kelling was born in Rochester, Minnesota, and attended John Marshall High School. He played football, basketball, and track and field for the school. He did not play football with the intent to play at the collegiate level, instead hoping to play college basketball.

In 1988, Kelling ultimately enrolled at Mankato State University—now known as Minnesota State University, Mankato. He walked-on the football team as a safety, a position he did not play in high school. As a freshman, he played regularly and finished the season with 33 tackles, one interception, and one fumble recovery. He earned Second-team All-North Central Conference (NCC) honors as a sophomore. In his junior and senior year he earned first-team honors. As a senior, he became the first Mankato State player to be named to the Kodak All-America team.

Due to Keller's success at Mankato State, NFL draft analyst Mel Kiper Jr. projected Keller to be drafted in the sixth round of the 1992 NFL draft to the Minnesota Vikings. He was even listed as a potential "sleeper" possibly going as high as the third round according to The Sporting News. Kelling ultimately went undrafted and a medical exam discovered bulging discs in his neck, meaning any serious hit could result in him becoming permanently paralyzed. The diagnostic was discovered while working out at the NFL Scouting Combine in Indianapolis, but was kept a secret from Kelling despite all NFL teams knowing.

Kelling was inducted into the Minnesota State Hall of Fame in 2004.

== Coaching career ==
In 1992, Kelling began his coaching career a student assistant coach for his alma mater, Mankato State. He transitioned to a graduate assistant in 1994. In 1996, he was hired as the defensive backs coach and strength and conditioning coach for Augustana (SD). In 1999, he transitioned to wide receivers coach. In 2004, he left Augustana and was hired as the defensive backs coach for NCAA Division I-AA North Dakota. After two seasons in 2006, he was promoted to co-defensive coordinator. He remained with the team until 2011. In 2012, he was hired as the associate head coach and defensive coordinator for Mary. In 2014, he was hired as the defensive coordinator and linebackers coach for Frostburg State.

Kelling remained with the Bobcats for six seasons before he was hired as the head coach for Lock Haven University in 2020. The team did not play in 2020 due to COVID-19. In 2021, he led the team to an overall record of 1–10 in what turned out to be his lone season with the team. He was fired after the season.

In 2022, Kelling was hired as the associate head coach, defensive coordinator, and linebackers coach for Southern Utah.

== Personal life ==
During his college career, he worked as a bouncer at the Mankato Albatross Bar.

In July 1994, Kelling was arrested for driving with a suspended licensed and was ordered to pay a fine of $241.50.

== Head coaching record ==
Year	Team	Overall	Conference	Standing	Bowl/playoffs
Lock Haven Bald Eagles (Pennsylvania State Athletic Conference) (2020–2021)
2020–21	No team—COVID-19				
2021	Lock Haven	1–10	0–7	8th (East)	
Lock Haven:		1–10	0–7		
Total:		1–10			
