= Memorial Stadium (Tarleton State) =

Stadium in Stephenville, Texas

Coordinates: 32.215°N 98.224°W

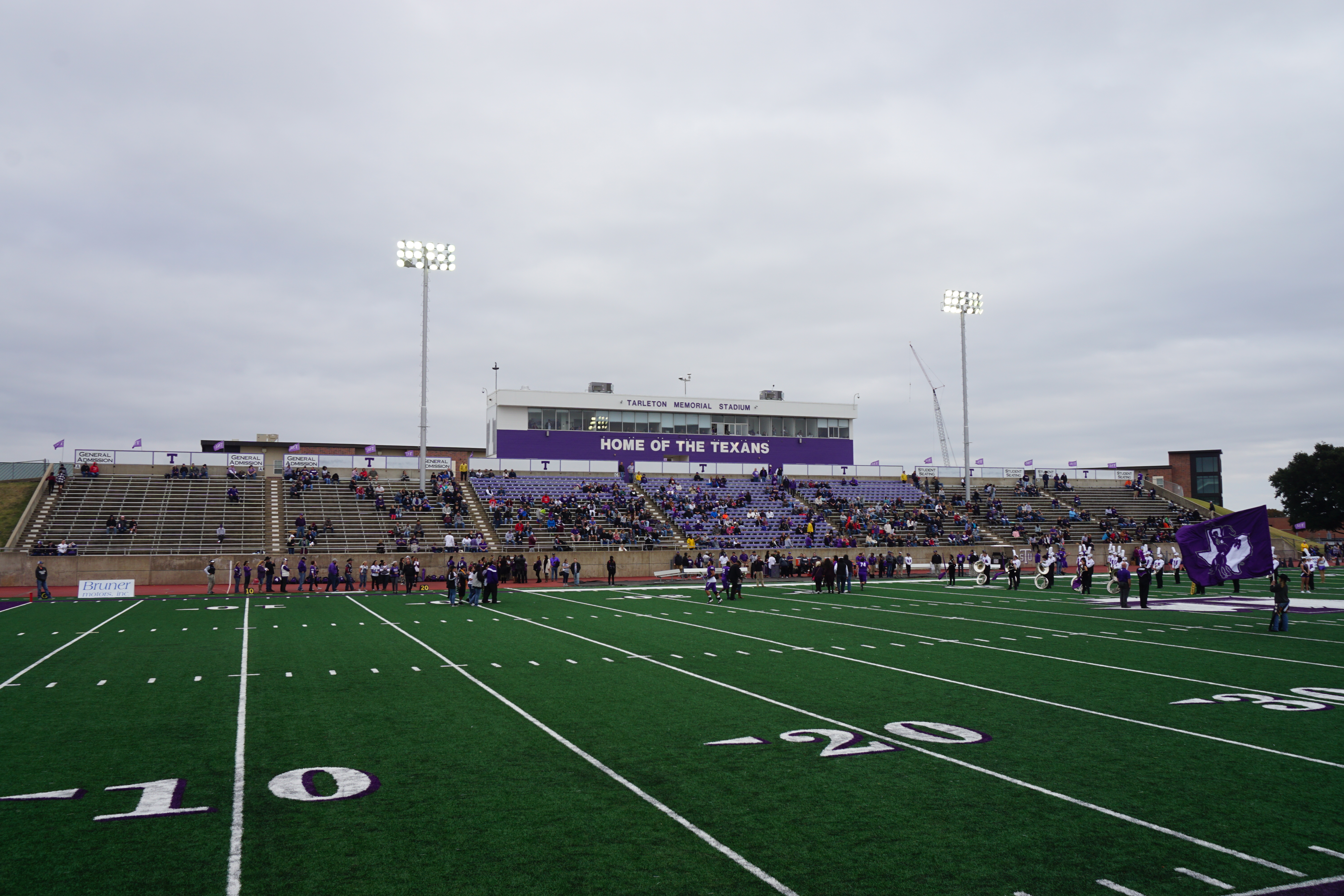
- Interactive map of Memorial Stadium
- Address: N Harbin Dr; Stephenville, TX 76401
- Capacity: 24,000 (2022–present); Former capacity: List: 15,000 (2019–21); 7,600 (1988–2018); 6,000 (1951–87)
- Record attendance: 24,612 (September 19, 2026 vs. Merrimack)

Construction
- Built: 1948–50
- Opened: 1951
- Expanded: 1977, 1988, 2019, 2022
- Cost: $100,000 (1951) $475,000 (1977) $2 million (1988) $26 million (2019)

Tenants
- Tarleton State Texans (NCAA); Football (1951–present); Track and field (1951–2022)

Memorial Stadium is a stadium in Stephenville, Texas. It is primarily used for American football, and is the home field of the Tarleton State University Texans football team. It opened in 1951 and has been renovated several times since then; currently seating 24,000 people. In 2004, the playing surface was changed from natural grass to synthetic turf.

The stadium was constructed from 1948 to 1950 and opened in 1951 at a cost of $100,000, seating 6,000 fans in its original condition. The facility also included a cinder running track that hosted the Texans' track and field program.

A $475,000 project in 1977 added a new press box and a berm to accommodate overflow crowds. An additional project in 1988 added 1,600 seats to boost capacity to 7,600. The $2 million project also added the current field house behind the south end zone.

In 2017 the stadium began a $26.5 million expansion and renovation. This expansion involved the complete reconstruction of the west side of the stadium. A two tiered press box with club level seating was added. This resulted in the home stands being moved to the brand new west side of the stadium and the old east side for visiting fans and the old press box being used for visiting coaches and overflow media. This renovation was completed in the summer of 2019 bringing the total capacity of the stadium to 15,000.

On October 22, 2021, it was announced that the stadium would continue expansion for the next 18 months with the planned addition of permanent end zone seating to raise the total capacity to 24,000. One day later on October 23, the record attendance was set at the stadium with 16,216 fans in attendance for Tarleton, versus Midwestern State. Tarleton won the contest 17–14.

As part of the 2022 project, the Oscar Frazier track was moved out of Memorial Stadium to a standalone facility just north of the stadium. Texans track and field began using the new track in 2023.

During the 2023 season, Tarleton State shattered attendance records by drawing over 20,000 fans on three occasions, setting the current attendance mark with 23,042 in attendance on October 18, 2023, vs. Morehead State.

== Year by year ==
Season	Head Coach	Conference	Avg. Crowd	Home Record
2018	Todd Whitten	Lone Star Conference	4,712	8–0
2019	Todd Whitten	Lone Star Conference	8,952	5–1
2020	Todd Whitten	Independent	3,980	3–3
2021	Todd Whitten	WAC	9,204	5–1
2022	Todd Whitten	WAC	12,020	4–2
2023	Todd Whitten	UAC(football)	18,697	4–1
2024	Todd Whitten	UAC(football)	18,814	4–2
2025	Todd Whitten	UAC(football)	20,840	6–0
2026	Todd Whitten	UAC	21,418	6–0
