= Tye Hiatt =

American football coach (born 1985)

Current position
- Title: Head coach
- Team: Cedar HS (UT)

Biographical details
- Born: December 17, 1985 (age 40); Boise, Idaho, U.S.
- Education: Southern Virginia University (2012); Liberty University (2015)

Playing career
- 2005–2008: Southern Virginia
- Position: Wide receiver

Coaching career (HC unless noted)
- 2011: Southern Virginia (WR)
- 2012: Southern Virginia (OL)
- 2013: Southern Virginia (OC/QB)
- 2014–2018: Frostburg State (OC/QB)
- 2019–2020: Shepherd (OC/QB)
- 2021–2022: Eastern New Mexico
- 2023: Southern Utah (OC/QB)
- 2024–present: Cedar HS (UT)

Head coaching record
- Overall: 6–15 (college); 17-7 (high school)

Accomplishments and honors

Awards
- First Team All-Independent (2008) Honorable Mention All-American (2008)

Tye Hiatt (born December 17, 1985) is an American high school coach. He is the head football coach for Cedar High School, a position he has held since 2024. In his second season he led Cedar High School to their first State Championship in school history (75 Years). For his efforts he was named UHSAA Coach of the Month presented by the Las Vegas Raiders. He was the head football coach for Eastern New Mexico University from 2021 to 2022. He also coached for Southern Virginia, Frostburg State, Shepherd, and Southern Utah. He played college football for Southern Virginia as a wide receiver.

== Head coaching record ==
=== College ===
Year	Team	Overall	Conference	Standing	Bowl/playoffs
Eastern New Mexico Greyhounds (American Southwest Conference) (2021–2022)
2021	Eastern New Mexico	4–7	1–6	7th	
2022	Eastern New Mexico	3–8	2–7	9th	
Eastern New Mexico:		7–15	3–13		
Total:		7–15			

=== High school ===
Year	Team	Overall	Conference	Standing	Bowl/playoffs	
Cedar Reds () (2024–present)
2024	Cedar	4–7	1–5	7th	Lost in 4A UHSAA playoffs first round	
2025	Cedar	13-0	6-0	1st	Won 3A UHSAA State Championship	19
Cedar:		17-7	7-5			
Total:		0–0				
