= Wildcat Stadium =

Wildcat Stadium may refer to one of the following sports stadiums in the United States:

Entries are listed alphabetically by state

- Wildcat Stadium (Fort Valley, Georgia), home football field of Fort Valley State University
- Wildcat Stadium (Louisiana), multi-sport stadium of Destrehan High School in Destrehan, Louisiana
- Wildcat Stadium (Louisiana College), multi-purpose stadium in Pineville, Louisiana
- Wildcat Stadium (University of New Hampshire), in Durham, New Hampshire, formerly known as Cowell Stadium and Lewis Field
- Anthony Field at Wildcat Stadium, in Abilene, Texas, home football field of Abilene Christian University
- Wildcat Stadium (Weber State), in Ogden, Utah, now known as Stewart Stadium
- Wildcat Memorial Stadium, in Oak Harbor, Washington, multi-sport home field of Oak Harbor High School (Washington)

== See also ==
- Wildcat Field (League City, Texas), on the campus of Clear Creek High School
- Bobcat Stadium (disambiguation)
