= United Athletic Conference (football) =

Former college athletics conference

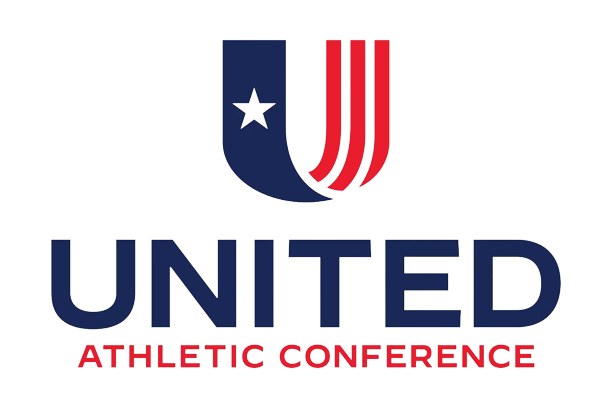
- Formerly: WAC–ASUN Challenge (2021–2022); ASUN–WAC Football Conference (2022–2023)
- Association: NCAA
- Founded: July 1, 2023; 3 years ago
- Folded: July 1, 2026; 2 months ago
- Replaced by: all-sports UAC
- Commissioner: Brian Thornton (2022–2024); Jeff Bacon (2023–2026)
- Sports fielded: 1; men's: 1; women's: 0
- Division: Division I
- Subdivision: FCS (football)
- No. of teams: 9
- Region: Southwestern United States; Western United States; Southern United States
- Website: uacfootball.com

Locations
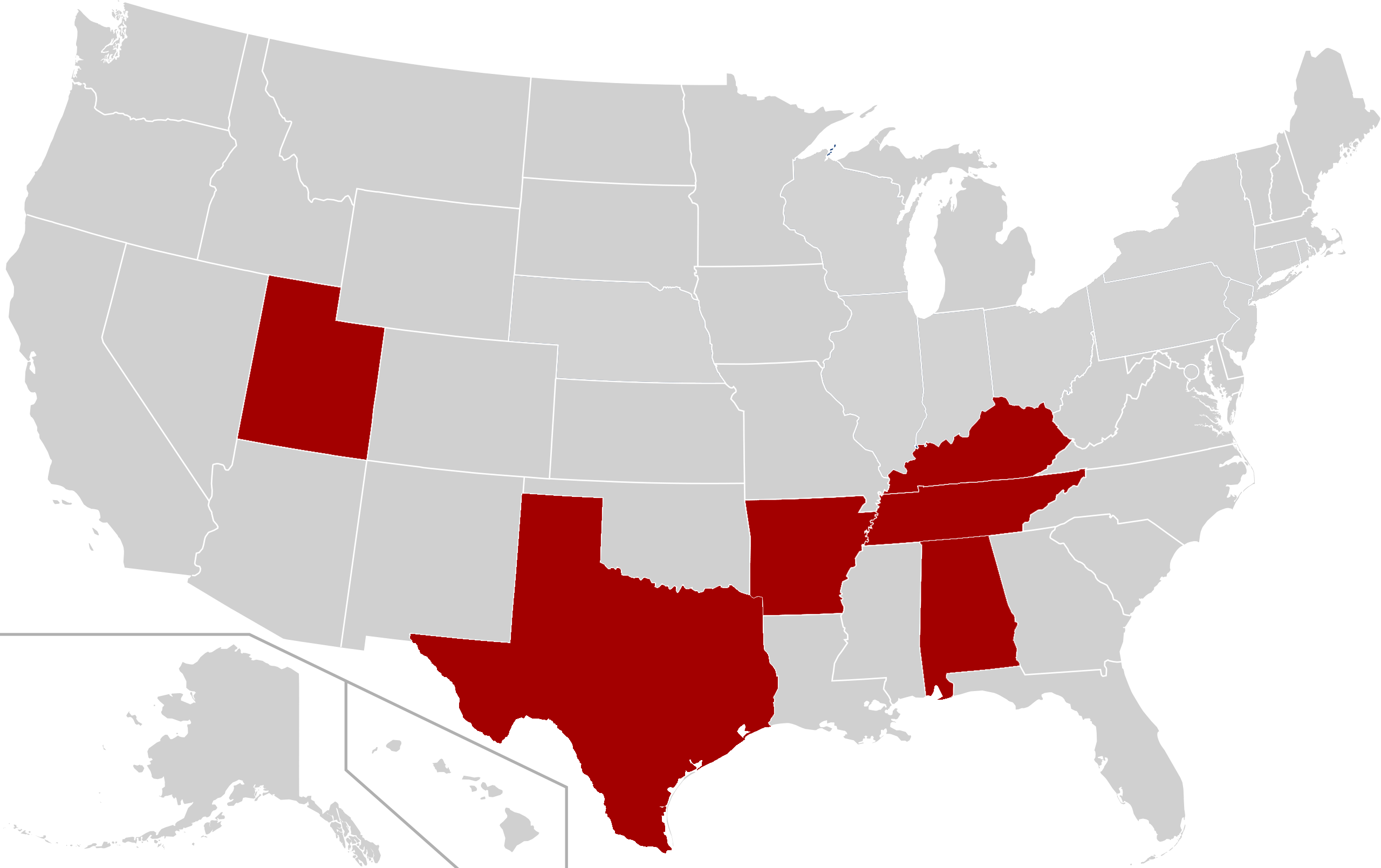

The United Athletic Conference (UAC), also known as The United, was an intercollegiate athletic conference formed in 2023 for the sport of football. It originated as an alliance of the existing football leagues of the Atlantic Sun Conference (ASUN) and Western Athletic Conference (WAC). Its members competed in the NCAA Division I Football Championship Subdivision (FCS). On July 1, 2026, the UAC ceased to exist as a football-only conference, and the WAC assumed the UAC name as part of a strategic rebranding. The members of the football-only UAC became the core membership of the all-sports UAC.

== History ==
=== 2021 season as "AQ7" ===
After sponsoring major-college football (ultimately at the FBS level) from 1962 through 2012, the WAC suffered membership changes that transformed it into a non-football conference as of 2013, and it remained so for eight seasons. On January 14, 2021, the WAC announced the addition of five new members, all of which were already playing FCS football, and declared its intention to reinstate football as a conference sport at the FCS level. The new members included the "Texas Four" of Abilene Christian University, Lamar University, Sam Houston State University, and Stephen F. Austin State University, all from the Southland Conference, along with Southern Utah University, from the Big Sky Conference. Initially, all five planned to join the WAC in July 2022, but the entry of the Texas Four was moved up to July 2021 after the Southland expelled its departing members.

The same week that the WAC announced its plans to resume football, the Atlantic Sun Conference (then officially branded as the ASUN Conference) revealed plans to sponsor the sport for the first time, also at the FCS level. On January 29, 2021, the ASUN announced that it would be adding three football-playing schools: Eastern Kentucky University, the University of Central Arkansas, and former member Jacksonville State University.

Both the WAC and the ASUN thus fell short of the minimum six football-playing members needed for an automatic qualifier to the FCS postseason. On February 23, 2021, they announced a partnership in which the WAC's Texas Four would join the three incoming ASUN football members for at least the 2021 season, in what was called the ASUN–WAC (or WAC–ASUN) Challenge. The Challenge was abbreviated as the "AQ7", as the top finisher of the seven teams would be an automatic qualifier for the FCS postseason.

=== 2022 season: AQ alliance renewed ===
For the 2022 season, the ASUN added former Big South members North Alabama and Kennesaw State, along with former Ohio Valley Conference member Austin Peay. Meanwhile, the WAC added Southland Conference member Incarnate Word, former Division II schools Tarleton State and Utah Tech, and non-football playing UT Arlington from the Sun Belt Conference, along with previously-announced Southern Utah. These additions should have given both conferences the minimum six eligible FCS football schools needed for a postseason AQ in 2022, but unexpected departures, and announcements of departures, left them short of this goal. On November 5, 2021, it was reported that Jacksonville State of the ASUN and Sam Houston State of the WAC would be leaving the FCS ranks for Conference USA, effective in fall 2023. Then, on April 8, 2022, Lamar announced it was leaving the WAC after just one season to return to its former home, the Southland Conference. Finally, on June 24, 2022, Incarnate Word made a last-minute decision to stay in the Southland rather than join the WAC.

The net result still left the WAC and ASUN each with six football-playing members, but the FBS transitions of Sam Houston State and Jacksonville State made them ineligible for the FCS postseason, and the WAC could not yet count Tarleton State and Utah Tech, both also ineligible because of their transitions from D2 to FCS. The mutual setbacks led the two conferences to renew their AQ alliance for the 2022 season with their eight remaining playoff-eligible members, five from the ASUN and three from the WAC. They kept separate football standings (with Jacksonville State eligible for the ASUN title and Sam Houston State eligible for the WAC title) but for playoff qualification purposes, only the joint ASUN-WAC Challenge standings mattered.

=== Merger as United Athletic Conference ===
On December 9, 2022, ESPN reported that the ASUN and WAC had agreed to form a new football-only conference to start play in 2024, with an initial nine-team lineup including Austin Peay, Central Arkansas, Eastern Kentucky, and North Alabama from the ASUN, and Abilene Christian, Southern Utah, Stephen F. Austin, Tarleton State, and Utah Tech from the WAC. The ASUN's fifth AQ alliance participant from the 2022 season, Kennesaw State, was not included after announcing in mid-October that it would be following Jacksonville State and Sam Houston State to Conference USA, effective in fall 2024. Kennesaw ended up playing the 2023 season as an FCS independent.

The new football conference reportedly planned to move "from what is currently known as FCS football to what is currently known as FBS football at the earliest practicable date." On December 20, the ASUN and WAC confirmed their football merger, announcing that the new league would start to play in 2023 under the tentative name of "ASUN–WAC Football Conference." League members drafted a six-game schedule in 2023 and planned to start full round-robin play in 2024. Neither conference's official announcement of the football merger mentioned any plans to move to FBS.

The ASUN and WAC jointly announced on January 5, 2023, that the football conference had established a basic governing structure and had hired Oliver Luck as executive director. On April 17, 2023, the ASUN-WAC football partnership formally rebranded as the United Athletic Conference (UAC). Later the same month, the NCAA denied the UAC's waiver request to be recognized as a single-sport FCS football conference. The UAC operated under its new name nevertheless, with the NCAA officially recognizing only the continuation of the ASUN-WAC partnership formed in 2021.

On September 8, 2023, the University of West Georgia announced it would transition from Division II and join the ASUN in 2024, with its football program joining the UAC. Non-football WAC member UT Rio Grande Valley (UTRGV) also planned to add the sport at the FCS level and join the UAC for 2024, but on March 25, 2024 announced its football program would debut instead in the Southland Conference, UTRGV's new all-sports home as of 2024–25. Then, on May 29, 2024, Stephen F. Austin announced its intention to return to the Southland Conference, effective in fall 2024. Thus, for the 2024 season, the UAC remained a nine-team league, with eight continuing members plus West Georgia replacing Stephen F. Austin.

=== Absorption Into an all-sports conference ===
On June 26, 2025, the Atlantic Sun Conference and the Western Athletic Conference jointly announced a new organizational structure scheduled to take effect on July 1, 2026. Under the agreement, the Western Athletic Conference adopted the United Athletic Conference name and continues to operate as an NCAA Division I multi-sport conference, maintaining the WAC’s historical continuity and Division I status.

Beginning with the 2026–27 academic year, the rebranded all-sports conference includes Abilene Christian University, Tarleton State University, and the University of Texas at Arlington, along with the five pre-2026 ASUN institutions that sponsor scholarship football. The ASUN members that do not sponsor scholarship football continue to operate as an all-sports conference under the Atlantic Sun Conference name.

Conference officials described the 2026 reorganization as a continuation and rebranding of the Western Athletic Conference rather than the creation of a new league. Under this structure, the WAC’s existing NCAA Division I recognition and championship qualification status was retained by the renamed conference. The alliance between the two conferences was later unveiled as Unisun Sports.

Locations of United Athletic Conference members. Blue markers indicate football-playing members. Red markers indicate members departing in 2026. Yellow markers indicate members joining in 2026.

== Member schools ==
Institution	Location	Nickname	Joined (Note: The United Athletic Conference officially began in the 2023 season. The year joined reflects when the program joined the UAC or WAC-ASUN Challenge as a whole.)	Left	Colors	Primary conference (Note: Primary conference while a ASUN-WAC Challenge/UAC football member)	Current football conference
Abilene Christian University	Abilene, Texas	Wildcats	2021	2026		WAC	UAC
Austin Peay State University	Clarksville, Tennessee	Governors	2022	2026		ASUN	UAC
University of Central Arkansas	Conway, Arkansas	Bears	2021	2026		ASUN	UAC
Eastern Kentucky University	Richmond, Kentucky	Colonels	2021	2026		ASUN	UAC
Jacksonville State University	Jacksonville, Alabama	Gamecocks	2021	2022 (Note: The ASUN Conference and Western Athletic Conference both held individual conference schedules (WAC 2021-22, ASUN 2022 only) which included schools that were ineligible for the FCS postseason due to D-II or FBS transitions.: Tarleton and Utah Tech transitioned from Division II and therefore played only in the WAC in the 2021 and 2022 seasons.; Sam Houston and Jacksonville State began transitioning to FBS and therefore played in the WAC and ASUN, respectively, for the 2022 season.)		ASUN	CUSA
Kennesaw State University	Kennesaw, Georgia	Owls	2022	2023		ASUN	CUSA
Lamar University	Beaumont, Texas	Cardinals	2021	2022		WAC	Southland
University of North Alabama	Florence, Alabama	Lions	2022	2026		ASUN	UAC
Sam Houston State University	Huntsville, Texas	Bearkats	2021	2022		WAC	CUSA
Southern Utah University	Cedar City, Utah	Thunderbirds	2022	2026		WAC	Big Sky
Stephen F. Austin State University	Nacogdoches, Texas	Lumberjacks	2021	2024		WAC	Southland
Tarleton State University	Stephenville, Texas	Texans	2023	2026		WAC	UAC
Utah Tech University	St. George, Utah	Trailblazers	2023	2026		WAC	Big Sky
University of West Georgia	Carrollton, Georgia	Wolves	2024	2026		ASUN	UAC

=== Membership timeline ===
Full members (football-only prior to 2026) Affiliate members (football-only) Independent Other conference Other conference

== Yearly standings ==
2021 WAC–ASUN Challenge football standings
	Conf.			Overall
Team	W		L	W		L
No. 5 Sam Houston $^	6	–	0	11	–	1
No. 21 Stephen F. Austin ^	4	–	2	8	–	4
Eastern Kentucky	4	–	2	7	–	4
Central Arkansas	3	–	3	5	–	6
Jacksonville State	3	–	3	5	–	6
Abilene Christian	1	–	5	5	–	6
Lamar	0	–	6	1	–	9
$ – Conference champion; ^ – FCS playoff participant; Rankings from STATS Poll

2022 WAC–ASUN Challenge football standings
	Conf.			Overall
Team	W		L	W		L
Eastern Kentucky $^	4	–	1	7	–	5
Central Arkansas	4	–	1	5	–	6
Austin Peay	3	–	1	7	–	4
Stephen F. Austin	2	–	1	6	–	5
Abilene Christian	1	–	1	7	–	4
Kennesaw State	1	–	3	5	–	6
Southern Utah	0	–	3	5	–	6
North Alabama	0	–	4	1	–	10
$ – Conference champion; ^ – FCS playoff participant; Rankings from STATS Poll

2023 United Athletic Conference standings
	Conf.			Overall
Team	W		L	W		L
No. 18 Austin Peay $^	6	–	0	9	–	3
Central Arkansas	4	–	2	7	–	4
Southern Utah	4	–	2	6	–	5
Eastern Kentucky	4	–	2	5	–	6
Tarleton State*	4	–	2	8	–	3
Abilene Christian	3	–	3	5	–	6
North Alabama	1	–	5	3	–	8
Utah Tech*	1	–	5	2	–	9
Stephen F. Austin	0	–	6	3	–	8
$ – Conference champion; Note: Tarleton State and Utah Tech are ineligible for the UAC title and FCS postseason play due to transitions from NCAA Division II.; Rankings from STATS Poll

2024 United Athletic Conference standings
	Conf.			Overall
Team	W		L	W		L
No. 14 Abilene Christian $^	7	–	1	9	–	5
No. 13 Tarleton State ^	6	–	2	10	–	4
No. 21 Eastern Kentucky ^	6	–	2	8	–	5
Southern Utah	6	–	2	7	–	5
Central Arkansas	3	–	5	6	–	6
Austin Peay	3	–	5	4	–	8
North Alabama	3	–	5	3	–	9
West Georgia*	1	–	7	4	–	7
Utah Tech	1	–	7	1	–	11
$ – Conference champion; ^ – FCS playoff participant; Note: West Georgia is ineligible for the UAC title and FCS postseason play due to transition from NCAA Division II.; Rankings from STATS Poll

2025 United Athletic Conference standings
	Conf.			Overall
Team	W		L	W		L
No. 12 Abilene Christian +^	7	–	1	9	–	5
No. 6 Tarleton State +^	7	–	1	12	–	2
Southern Utah	6	–	2	7	–	5
West Georgia*	5	–	3	8	–	3
Austin Peay	4	–	4	7	–	5
Eastern Kentucky	3	–	5	5	–	7
Central Arkansas	2	–	6	3	–	9
Utah Tech	1	–	7	2	–	10
North Alabama	1	–	7	2	–	10
+ – Conference co-champions; ^ – FCS playoff participant; * – Ineligible for the UAC title and FCS postseason play due to transition from NCAA Division II.; Rankings from STATS Poll

== Conference champions ==
Year	Regular season champion(s)	Record	FCS Championship Result
2023	Austin Peay	9–3	L First round
2024	Abilene Christian	9–5	L Second round
2025	Abilene Christian (2)	9–5	L Second round
2025	Tarleton State	12–2	L Quarterfinals
