= 2025 Abilene Christian Wildcats football team =

American college football season

2025 Abilene Christian Wildcats football

UAC co-champion

NCAA Division I Second Round, L 34–41 at Stephen F. Austin
- Conference: United Athletic Conference

Ranking
- STATS: No. 12
- FCS Coaches: No. 12
- Record: 9–5 (7–1 UAC)
- Head coach: Keith Patterson (4th season)
- Co-offensive coordinators: Graham Harrell (1st season); Joel Filani (1st season)
- Offensive scheme: Air raid
- Co-defensive coordinator: Nick Holt (1st season)
- Base defense: Multiple 3–3–5
- Home stadium: Wildcat Stadium

2025 United Athletic Conference standings
	Conf.			Overall
Team	W		L	W		L
No. 12 Abilene Christian +^	7	–	1	9	–	5
No. 6 Tarleton State +^	7	–	1	12	–	2
Southern Utah	6	–	2	7	–	5
West Georgia*	5	–	3	8	–	3
Austin Peay	4	–	4	7	–	5
Eastern Kentucky	3	–	5	5	–	7
Central Arkansas	2	–	6	3	–	9
Utah Tech	1	–	7	2	–	10
North Alabama	1	–	7	2	–	10
+ – Conference co-champions; ^ – FCS playoff participant; * – Ineligible for the UAC title and FCS postseason play due to transition from NCAA Division II.; Rankings from STATS Poll

The 2025 Abilene Christian Wildcats football team represented Abilene Christian University as a member of the United Athletic Conference (UAC) during the 2025 NCAA Division I FCS football season. The Wildcats were led by fourth-year head coach Keith Patterson and played their home games at Wildcat Stadium in Abilene, Texas.

== Schedule ==
Abilene Christian announced the 2025 schedule on December 3, 2024.

Date	Time	Opponent	Rank	Site	TV	Result	Attendance
August 30	7:00 p.m.	at Tulsa*	No. 16	Skelly Field at H. A. Chapman Stadium; Tulsa, OK	ESPN+	L 7–35	17,337
September 6	7:00 p.m.	No. 25 Stephen F. Austin*	No. 16	Wildcat Stadium; Abilene, TX	ESPN+	W 28–20	8,042
September 13	7:00 p.m.	at TCU*	No. 13	Amon G. Carter Stadium; Fort Worth, TX	ESPN+	L 21–42	48,094
September 20	7:00 p.m.	No. 18 Austin Peay	No. 14	Wildcat Stadium; Abilene, TX	ESPN+	W 45–31	10,133
September 27	6:00 p.m.	at Incarnate Word*	No. 12	Gayle and Tom Benson Stadium; San Antonio, TX	ESPN+	L 7–38	3,006
October 4	2:00 p.m.	North Alabama	No. 19	Wildcat Stadium; Abilene, TX	ESPN+	W 52–23	7,377
October 11	1:00 p.m.	at No. 21 West Georgia	No. 19	University Stadium; Carrollton, GA	ESPN+	W 30–13	4,735
October 18	7:30 p.m.	at Southern Utah	No. 13	Eccles Coliseum; Cedar City, UT	ESPN+	L 24–31	2,030
November 1	3:00 p.m.	No. 2 Tarleton State^{†}	No. 24	Wildcat Stadium; Abilene, TX	ESPN+	W 31–28	12,000
November 8	2:00 p.m.	Utah Tech	No. 18	Wildcat Stadium; Abilene, TX	ESPN+	W 31–10	7,833
November 15	2:00 p.m.	at Eastern Kentucky	No. 18	Roy Kidd Stadium; Richmond, KY	ESPN+	W 17–10	4,067
November 22	4:00 p.m.	at Central Arkansas	No. 17	Estes Stadium; Conway, AR	ESPN+	W 49–28	4,736
November 29	12:00 p.m.	No. 25 Lamar*	No. 13	Wildcat Stadium; Abilene, TX (NCAA Division I First Round)	ESPN+	W 38–20	4,588
December 6	12:00 p.m.	at No. 10 Stephen F. Austin*	No. 13	Homer Bryce Stadium; Nacogdoches, TX (NCAA Division I Second Round)	ESPN+	L 34–41	8,645
*Non-conference game; ^{†}Homecoming; Rankings from STATS Poll released prior to the game; All times are in Central time

== Rankings ==
Ranking movements Legend: ██ Increase in ranking ██ Decrease in ranking т = Tied with team above or below
	Week														
Poll	Pre	1	2	3	4	5	6	7	8	9	10	11	12	13	Final
STATS FCS	16	16	13	14	12	19	19	13	23	24	18	18	17	13	12
Coaches	16	17	13	15	13	23	21т	17	25	25	20	20	18	14	12

== Game summaries ==
=== at Tulsa (FBS) ===
No. 16 Abilene Christian Wildcats (0–0) at Tulsa Golden Hurricane (FBS) (0–0) – Game summary

Quarter	1	2	3	4	Total
No. 16 Wildcats	0	0	0	7	7
Golden Hurricane (FBS)	7	3	11	14	35

at Skelly Field • Tulsa, Oklahoma

- Date: August 30
- Game time: 7:00 p.m. CDT
- Game weather: Cloudy, 78 °F (26 °C)
- Game attendance: 17,337
- Referee: Edwin Lee
- TV announcers (ESPN+): James Westling and Leger Douzable
- Box score, Recap

Game information

First quarter

- TLSA – Zion Booker 12-yard pass from Kirk Francis (Seth Morgan kick), 1:34. Golden Hurricane 7–0. Drive: 14 plays, 97 yards, 4:43.

Second quarter

- TLSA – Seth Morgan 28-yard field goal, 8:47. Golden Hurricane 10–0. Drive: 7 plays, 41 yards, 1:26.

Third quarter

- TLSA – Seth Morgan 40-yard field goal, 11:58. Golden Hurricane 13–0. Drive: 11 plays, 53 yards, 3:02.
- TLSA – Dominic Richardson 57-yard run (Braylin Presley–Kirk Francis pass), 3:55. Golden Hurricane 21–0. Drive: 8 plays, 92 yards, 2:28.

Fourth quarter

- TLSA – Brody Foley 22-yard pass from Kirk Francis (Seth Morgan kick), 13:57. Golden Hurricane 28–0. Drive: 8 plays, 71 yards, 3:18.
- TLSA – Ajay Allen 40-yard run (Seth Morgan kick), 11:46. Golden Hurricane 35–0. Drive: 3 plays, 45 yards, 0:47.
- ACU – Stone Earle 11-yard run (Kyler Meschi kick), 6:42. Golden Hurricane 35–7. Drive: 10 plays, 75 yards, 5:04.

Statistics	ACU	TLSA
First downs	13	25
Plays–yards	59–260	80–499
Rushes–yards	40–120	46–263
Passing yards	140	236
Passing: comp–att–int	13–19–1	22–34–0
Turnovers	1	0
Time of possession	26:55	33:05

Team	Category	Player	Statistics
Abilene Christian	Passing	Stone Earle	13/19, 140 yards, INT
Abilene Christian	Rushing	Jordon Vaughn	15 carries, 50 yards
Abilene Christian	Receiving	Javon Gipson	3 receptions, 73 yards
Tulsa	Passing	Kirk Francis	20/31, 218 yards, 2 TD
Tulsa	Rushing	Dominic Richardson	20 carries, 142 yards, TD
Tulsa	Receiving	Micah Tease	4 receptions, 69 yards

=== No. 25 Stephen F. Austin ===
No. 25 Stephen F. Austin Lumberjacks (0-1) at No. 16 Abilene Christian Wildcats (0-1) – Game summary

Quarter	1	2	3	4	Total
No. 25 Lumberjacks	14	0	0	6	20
No. 16 Wildcats	0	21	7	0	28

at Wildcat Stadium • Abilene, Texas

- Date: September 6
- Game time: 7:00 p.m. CDT
- Game weather: Sunny, 76 °F (24 °C)
- Game attendance: 8,042
- Referee: Jeremee Tate
- TV announcers (ESPN+): Grant Boone (play-by-play), Jim Reese (analyst)
- Box score, Recap

Game information

First quarter

- SFA – Jordan Nabors 7-yard run (Carlos Alvarado kick), 9:23. Lumberjacks 7–0. Drive: 10 plays, 61 yards, 3:42.
- SFA – Blaine Greene 3-yard pass from Gavin Rutherford (Carlos Alvarado kick), 1:43. Lumberjacks 14–0. Drive: 8 plays, 69 yards, 3:17.

Second quarter

- ACU – Stone Earle 1-yard run (Brandon Perez kick), 6:47. Lumberjacks 14–7. Drive: 16 plays, 82 yards, 6:44.
- ACU – Kaghen Roach 0-yard fumble return (Brandon Perez kick), 6:07. Tied 14–14.
- ACU – Jordon Vaughn 1-yard run (Brandon Perez kick), 1:57. Wildcats 21–14. Drive: 6 plays, 33 yards, 2:36.

Third quarter

- ACU – Jordon Vaughn 1-yard run (Brandon Perez kick), 9:58. Wildcats 28–14. Drive: 9 plays, 63 yards, 3:51.

Fourth quarter

- SFA – Bugs Mortimer 52-yard punt return (pass failed), 0:20. Wildcats 28–20.

Statistics	SFA	ACU
First downs	16	20
Total yards	300	371
Rushing yards	52	132
Passing yards	248	239
Passing: Comp–Att–Int	25–39–1	23–34–0
Time of possession	25:11	34:49

Team	Category	Player	Statistics
Stephen F. Austin	Passing	Sam Vidlak	24/38, 245 yards, INT
Stephen F. Austin	Rushing	Jerrell Wimbley	12 rushes, 44 yards
Stephen F. Austin	Receiving	Kylon Harris	9 receptions, 105 yards
Abilene Christian	Passing	Stone Earle	23/34, 239 yards
Abilene Christian	Rushing	Jordon Vaughn	23 rushes, 87 yards, 2 TD
Abilene Christian	Receiving	Javon Gibson	7 receptions, 82 yards

=== at TCU (FBS) ===
No. 13 Abilene Christian Wildcats (1-1) at TCU Horned Frogs (FBS) (1-0) – Game summary

Quarter	1	2	3	4	Total
No. 13 Wildcats	0	0	9	12	21
Horned Frogs (FBS)	14	14	7	7	42

at Amon G. Carter Stadium • Fort Worth, Texas

- Date: September 13
- Game time: 7:00 p.m. CDT
- Game weather: Clear, 87 °F (31 °C)
- Game attendance: 48,094
- Referee: Stephen Baron
- TV announcers (ESPN+): Roxy Bernstein (play-by-play) and Todd Doxzon (analyst)
- Box score, Recap

Game information

First quarter

- TCU – Chase Curtis 11-yard pass from Josh Hoover (Nate McCashland kick), 11:43. Horned Frogs 7–0. Drive: 7 plays, 88 yards, 3:09.
- TCU – Ed Small 8-yard pass from Josh Hoover (Nate McCashland kick), 4:33. Horned Frogs 14–0. Drive: 10 plays, 77 yards, 3:13.

Second quarter

- TCU – Trent Battle 1-yard run (Nate McCashland kick), 13:10. Horned Frogs 21–0. Drive: 7 plays, 93 yards, 2:37.
- TCU – Ed Small 15-yard pass from Josh Hoover (Nate McCashland kick), 1:24. Horned Frogs 28–0. Drive: 11 plays, 69 yards, 4:20.

Third quarter

- ACU – Rovaughn Banks Jr. 1-yard run (kick failed), 10:23. Horned Frogs 28–6. Drive: 9 plays, 75 yards, 4:37.
- TCU – Jordan Dwyer 21-yard pass from Josh Hoover (Nate McCashland kick), 8:59. Horned Frogs 35–6. Drive: 5 plays, 75 yards, 1:19.
- ACU – Brandon Perez 33-yard field goal, 3:45. Horned Frogs 35–9. Drive: 11 plays, 58 yards, 5:14.

Fourth quarter

- TCU – Jon Denman 2-yard run (Nate McCashland kick), 14:56. Horned Frogs 42–9. Drive: 10 plays, 60 yards, 3:42.
- ACU – Bryan Henry 7-yard pass from Stone Earle (pass failed), 11:08. Horned Frogs 42–15. Drive: 9 plays, 75 yards, 3:48.
- ACU – J. B. Mitchell III 9-yard pass from Stone Earle (pass failed), 6:40. Horned Frogs 42–21. Drive: 8 plays, 78 yards, 3:16.

Statistics	ACU	TCU
First downs	27	24
Plays–yards	75–453	60–489
Rushes–yards	46–177	28–128
Passing yards	276	361
Passing: comp–att–int	22–29–0	25–32–1
Turnovers	0	1
Time of possession	36:43	23:17

Team	Category	Player	Statistics
Abilene Christian	Passing	Stone Earle	22/29, 276 yards, 2 TD
Abilene Christian	Rushing	Rovaughn Banks Jr.	19 rushes, 105 yards, TD
Abilene Christian	Receiving	J. B. Mitchell III	5 receptions, 88 yards, TD
TCU	Passing	Josh Hoover	21/27, 337 yards, 4 TD
TCU	Rushing	Kevorian Barnes	10 rushes, 43 yards
TCU	Receiving	Joseph Manjack IV	4 receptions, 114 yards

=== No. 18 Austin Peay ===
No. 18 Austin Peay Governors (2-1) at No. 14 Abilene Christian Wildcats (1-2) – Game summary

Quarter	1	2	3	4	Total
No. 18 Governors	0	3	7	21	31
No. 14 Wildcats	7	17	7	14	45

at Wildcat Stadium • Abilene, Texas

- Date: September 20
- Game time: 7:00 p.m. CDT
- Game weather: Sunny
- Game attendance: 10,133
- Referee: Zach Erdmann
- TV announcers (ESPN+): Andy Penney (play-by-play), Jim Reese (analyst) and Kendra Sheehan (sideline)
- Box score, Recap

Game information

First quarter

- ACU – Stone Earle 4-yard run (Brandon Perez kick), 9:34. Wildcats 7–0. Drive: 1 play, 4 yards, 0:04.

Second quarter

- ACU – Raydrian Baltrip 26-yard pass from Stone Earle (Brandon Perez kick), 13:52. Wildcats 14–0. Drive: 7 plays, 63 yards, 3:10.
- APSU – Carson Smith 22-yard field goal, 9:25. Wildcats 14–3. Drive: 11 plays, 63 yards, 4:20.
- ACU – Dallas Dudley 5-yard pass from Stone Earle (Brandon Perez kick), 4:28. Wildcats 21–3. Drive: 6 plays, 22 yards, 2:48.
- ACU – Brandon Perez 23-yard field goal, 0:00. Wildcats 24–3. Drive: 11 plays, 92 yards, 1:07.

Third quarter

- ACU – Jed Castles 4-yard pass from Stone Earle (Brandon Perez kick), 9:13. Wildcats 31–3. Drive: 12 plays, 75 yards, 5:47.
- APSU – Chris Parson 2-yard run (Carson Smith kick), 1:27. Wildcats 31–10. Drive: 4 plays, 58 yards, 2:27.

Fourth quarter

- APSU – Chris Parson 1-yard run (Carson Smith kick), 13:24. Wildcats 31–17. Drive: 7 plays, 60 yards, 2:17.
- ACU – Stone Earle 35-yard run (Brandon Perez kick), 10:25. Wildcats 38–17. Drive: 7 plays, 66 yards, 2:59.
- APSU – Jaden Robinson 44-yard pass from Chris Parson (Carson Smith kick), 8:57. Wildcats 38–24. Drive: 4 plays, 75 yards, 1:28.
- ACU – Raydrian Baltrip 55-yard pass from Stone Earle (Brandon Perez kick), 7:45. Wildcats 45–24. Drive: 4 plays, 75 yards, 1:05.
- APSU – Jackson Head 6-yard pass from Chris Parson (Carson Smith kick), 1:56. Wildcats 45–31. Drive: 16 plays, 75 yards, 5:49.

Statistics	APSU	ACU
First downs	23	22
Total yards	434	432
Rushing yards	104	93
Passing yards	330	339
Passing: Comp–Att–Int	24–39–0	30–42–1
Time of possession	31:54	28:06

Team	Category	Player	Statistics
Austin Peay	Passing	Chris Parson	24/38, 330 yards, 2 TD
Austin Peay	Rushing	Chris Parson	17 rushes, 38 yards, 2 TD
Austin Peay	Receiving	Jackson Head	7 receptions, 132 yards, TD
Abilene Christian	Passing	Stone Earle	30/42, 339 yards, 4 TD, INT
Abilene Christian	Rushing	Stone Earle	4 rushes, 46 yards, 2 TD
Abilene Christian	Receiving	Raydrian Baltrip	6 receptions, 112 yards, 2 TD

=== at Incarnate Word ===
No. 12 Abilene Christian Wildcats (2-2) at Incarnate Word Cardinals (1-3) – Game summary

Quarter	1	2	3	4	Total
No. 12 Wildcats	7	0	0	0	7
Cardinals	7	10	14	7	38

at Gayle and Tom Benson Stadium • San Antonio, Texas

- Date: September 27
- Game time: 6:00 p.m. CDT
- Game weather: Sunny, 91 °F (33 °C)
- Game attendance: 3,006
- Referee: Gary Leeper
- TV announcers (ESPN+): Karl Schoening (play-by-play) and Sam Kaman (analyst)
- Box score, Recap

Game information

First quarter

- ACU – Dallas Dudley 21-yard pass from Stone Earle (Brandon Perez kick), 11:10. Wildcats 7–0. Drive: 3 plays, 88 yards, 1:09.
- UIW – Jalen Walthall 4-yard pass from EJ Colson (Will Faris kick), 4:05. Tied 7–7. Drive: 15 plays, 75 yards, 7:05.

Second quarter

- UIW – Will Faris 32-yard field goal, 13:54. Cardinals 10–7. Drive: 10 plays, 61 yards, 4:12.
- UIW – EJ Colson 1-yard run (Will Faris kick), 6:37. Cardinals 17–7. Drive: 12 plays, 52 yards, 5:26.

Third quarter

- UIW – EJ Colson 3-yard run (Will Faris kick), 4:55. Cardinals 24–7. Drive: 16 plays, 76 yards, 6:49.
- UIW – Declan Williams 28-yard interception return (Will Faris kick), 4:48. Cardinals 31–7.

Fourth quarter

- UIW – Jaylon Spears 11-yard run (Will Faris kick), 1:10. Cardinals 38–7. Drive: 9 plays, 79 yards, 5:20.

Statistics	ACU	UIW
First downs	16	28
Total yards	248	423
Rushing yards	107	301
Passing yards	141	122
Passing: Comp–Att–Int	17–30–2	17–30–0
Time of possession	19:44	40:16

Team	Category	Player	Statistics
Abilene Christian	Passing	Stone Earle	17/30, 141 yards, TD, 2 INT
Abilene Christian	Rushing	Rovaughn Banks Jr.	14 rushes, 110 yards
Abilene Christian	Receiving	Javon Gipson	5 receptions, 53 yards
Incarnate Word	Passing	EJ Colson	17/30, 122 yards, TD
Incarnate Word	Rushing	Lontrell Turner	20 rushes, 118 yards
Incarnate Word	Receiving	Chedon James	5 receptions, 43 yards

=== North Alabama ===
North Alabama Lions (1-3) at No. 19 Abilene Christian Wildcats (2-3) – Game summary

Quarter	1	2	3	4	Total
Lions	0	7	3	13	23
No. 19 Wildcats	14	14	17	7	52

at Wildcat Stadium • Abilene, Texas

- Date: October 4
- Game time: 2:00 p.m. CDT
- Game weather: Sunny, 85 °F (29 °C)
- Game attendance: 7,377
- Referee: Matthew Jones
- TV announcers (ESPN+): Andy Penney (play-by-play) and Jim Reese (analyst)
- Box score, Recap

Game information

First quarter

- ACU – Grant Jones 1-yard run (Brandon Perez kick), 5:51. Wildcats 7–0. Drive: 7 plays, 76 yards, 3:27.
- ACU – Javon Gipson 39-yard pass from Stone Earle (Brandon Perez kick), 1:47. Wildcats 14–0. Drive: 4 plays, 67 yards, 2:02.

Second quarter

- ACU – Bryan Henry 13-yard pass from Stone Earle (Brandon Perez kick), 9:50. Wildcats 21–0. Drive: 10 plays, 85 yards, 5:27.
- UNA – Jayvian Allen 29-yard run (Ian Vachon kick), 6:01. Wildcats 21–7. Drive: 9 plays, 75 yards, 3:47.
- ACU – Bryan Henry 1-yard pass from Stone Earle (Brandon Perez kick), 0:55. Wildcats 28–7. Drive: 6 plays, 20 yards, 2:20.

Third quarter

- ACU – J. J. Henry 28-yard pass from Stone Earle (Brandon Perez kick), 11:23. Wildcats 35–7. Drive: 6 plays, 59 yards, 1:51.
- ACU – Brandon Perez 35-yard field goal, 4:13. Wildcats 38–7. Drive: 8 plays, 18 yards, 3:32.
- UNA – Ian Vachon 40-yard field goal, 2:13. Wildcats 38–10. Drive: 8 plays, 44 yards, 2:00.
- ACU – Jordon Vaughn 75-yard run (Brandon Perez kick), 2:01. Wildcats 45–10. Drive: 1 play, 75 yards, 0:12.

Fourth quarter

- UNA – Kaden Cooper 15-yard pass from DC Tabscott (kick failed), 10:15. Wildcats 45–16. Drive: 9 plays, 85 yards, 4:34.
- UNA – Tanaka Scott 24-yard pass from DC Tabscott (Ian Vachon kick), 9:11. Wildcats 45–23. Drive: 4 plays, 41 yards, 1:04.
- ACU – E. J. Wilson 10-yard run (Brandon Perez kick), 4:48. Wildcats 52–23. Drive: 9 plays, 50 yards, 4:22.

Statistics	UNA	ACU
First downs	15	24
Total yards	310	499
Rushing yards	133	230
Passing yards	177	269
Passing: Comp–Att–Int	15–31–0	23–33–1
Time of possession	24:21	35:39

Team	Category	Player	Statistics
North Alabama	Passing	DC Tabscott	11/24, 134 yards, 2 TD
North Alabama	Rushing	Jayvian Allen	11 rushes, 102 yards, TD
North Alabama	Receiving	Tanaka Scott	4 receptions, 60 yards, TD
Abilene Christian	Passing	Stone Earle	22/32, 261 yards, 4 TD, INT
Abilene Christian	Rushing	Jordon Vaughn	4 rushes, 84 yards, TD
Abilene Christian	Receiving	Javon Gipson	3 receptions, 69 yards, TD

=== at No. 21 West Georgia ===
No. 19 Abilene Christian Wildcats (3-3) at No. 21 West Georgia Wolves (5-1) – Game summary

Quarter	1	2	3	4	Total
No. 19 Wildcats	3	14	7	6	30
No. 21 Wolves	3	3	7	0	13

at University Stadium • Carrollton, Georgia

- Date: October 11
- Game time: 1:00 p.m. CDT/2:00 p.m. EDT
- Game weather: Sunny, 71 °F (22 °C)
- Game attendance: 4,735
- Referee: John Kellermeier
- TV announcers (ESPN+): Patrick Eidson (play-by-play) and Parker Glore (analyst)
- Box score, Recap

Game information

First quarter

- UWG – Tommy Holden 21-yard field goal, 11:05. Wolves 3–0. Drive: 7 plays, 76 yards, 3:49.
- ACU – Brandon Perez 34-yard field goal, 7:24. Tied 3–3. Drive: 9 plays, 59 yards, 3:41.

Second quarter

- UWG – Tommy Holden 23-yard field goal, 12:21. Wolves 6–3. Drive: 12 plays, 75 yards, 4:25.
- ACU – J. B. Mitchell III 8-yard pass from Stone Earle (Brandon Perez kick), 6:11. Wildcats 10–6. Drive: 12 plays, 75 yards, 6:10.
- ACU – Jordon Vaughn 3-yard run (Brandon Perez kick), 2:19. Wildcats 17–6. Drive: 6 plays, 45 yards, 2:18.

Third quarter

- ACU – Chidubem Lebechi 6-yard pass from Stone Earle (Brandon Perez kick), 8:52. Wildcats 24–6. Drive: 6 plays, 55 yards, 3:26.
- UWG – DeAndre Buchannon 54-yard pass from Colton Fitzgerald (Tommy Holden kick), 6:34. Wildcats 24–13. Drive: 4 plays, 76 yards, 2:12.

Fourth quarter

- ACU – J. J. Henry 11-yard pass from Stone Earle (kick failed), 7:44. Wildcats 30–13. Drive: 19 plays, 94 yards, 10:29.

Statistics	ACU	UWG
First downs	27	12
Total yards	451	314
Rushing yards	210	35
Passing yards	241	279
Passing: Comp–Att–Int	21–32–0	19–38–1
Time of possession	38:59	21:01

Team	Category	Player	Statistics
Abilene Christian	Passing	Stone Earle	21/32, 241 yards, 3 TD
Abilene Christian	Rushing	Rovaughn Banks Jr.	21 rushes, 79 yards
Abilene Christian	Receiving	Javon Gipson	5 receptions, 76 yards
West Georgia	Passing	Colton Fitzgerald	15/28, 241 yards, TD
West Georgia	Rushing	Latrelle Murrell	10 rushes, 19 yards
West Georgia	Receiving	DeAndre Buchannon	6 receptions, 137 yards, TD

=== at Southern Utah ===
No. 13 Abilene Christian Wildcats (4-3) at Southern Utah Thunderbirds (1-5) – Game summary

Quarter	1	2	3	4	Total
No. 13 Wildcats	7	10	0	7	24
Thunderbirds	7	7	7	10	31

at Eccles Coliseum • Cedar City, Utah

- Date: October 18
- Game time: 7:30 p.m. CDT/6:30 p.m. MDT
- Game weather: Sunny, 55 °F (13 °C)
- Game attendance: 2,030
- Referee: Michael Lennie
- TV announcers (ESPN+): Spencer McLaughlin (play-by-play), Dallin Richards (analyst), and Kendall McGuire (sideline)
- Box score, Recap

Game information

First quarter

- SUU – Joshua Dye 18-yard run (Jayden Rogers kick), 5:40. Thunderbirds 7–0. Drive: 8 plays, 40 yards, 4:13.
- ACU – Stone Earle 7-yard run (Brandon Perez kick), 0:07. Tied 7–7. Drive: 10 plays, 75 yards, 5:33.

Second quarter

- ACU – Brandon Perez 19-yard field goal, 8:49. Wildcats 10–7. Drive: 9 plays, 51 yards, 4:51.
- SUU – Mikey Allen 32-yard interception return (Jayden Rogers kick), 1:59. Thunderbirds 14–10.
- ACU – Stone Earle 8-yard run (Brandon Perez kick), 0:57. Wildcats 17–14. Drive: 4 plays, 75 yards, 1:02.

Third quarter

- SUU – Joshua Dye 1-yard run (Jayden Rogers kick), 10:37. Thunderbirds 21–17. Drive: 8 plays, 57 yards, 4:11.

Fourth quarter

- ACU – Javon Gipson 28-yard pass from Stone Earle (Brandon Perez kick), 12:07. Wildcats 24–21. Drive: 3 plays, 91 yards, 1:28.
- SUU – Jayden Rogers 19-yard field goal, 6:53. Tied 24–24. Drive: 9 plays, 96 yards, 5:08.
- SUU – Shane Carr 17-yard pass from Bronson Barron (Jayden Rogers kick), 2:17. Thunderbirds 31–24. Drive: 6 plays, 47 yards, 2:34.

Statistics	ACU	SUU
First downs	21	15
Total yards	430	289
Rushing yards	205	173
Passing yards	225	116
Passing: Comp–Att–Int	17–23–3	15–20–1
Time of possession	31:03	28:57

Team	Category	Player	Statistics
Abilene Christian	Passing	Stone Earle	17/23, 225 yards, TD, 3 INT
Abilene Christian	Rushing	Jordon Vaughn	9 rushes, 124 yards
Abilene Christian	Receiving	Javon Gipson	3 receptions, 77 yards, TD
Southern Utah	Passing	Bronson Barron	13/17, 111 yards, TD, INT
Southern Utah	Rushing	Joshua Dye	26 rushes, 179 yards, 2 TD
Southern Utah	Receiving	Devin Downing	4 receptions, 42 yards

=== No. 2 Tarleton State ===
No. 2 Tarleton State Texans (9-0) at No. 24 Abilene Christian Wildcats (4-4) – Game summary

Quarter	1	2	3	4	Total
No. 2 Texans	0	10	0	18	28
No. 24 Wildcats	14	0	14	3	31

at Wildcat Stadium • Abilene, Texas

- Date: November 1
- Game time: 3:00 p.m. CDT
- Game weather: Sunny, 65 °F (18 °C)
- Game attendance: 12,000
- Referee: Jeremee Tate
- TV: ESPN+
- Box score, Recap

Game information

First quarter

- ACU – Jed Castles 2-yard pass from Stone Earle (Brandon Perez kick), 5:04. Wildcats 7–0. Drive: 7 plays, 70 yards, 3:59.
- ACU – Rovaughn Banks Jr. 40-yard run (Brandon Perez kick), 0:58. Wildcats 14–0. Drive: 3 plays, 63 yards, 1:21.

Second quarter

- TAR – Peyton Kramer 9-yard pass from Victor Gabalis (Brad Larson kick), 8:12. Wildcats 14–7. Drive: 13 plays, 87 yards, 5:19.
- TAR – Brad Larson 36-yard field goal, 4:57. Wildcats 14–10. Drive: 7 plays, 46 yards, 1:39.

Third quarter

- ACU – Rovaughn Banks Jr. 2-yard run (Brandon Perez kick), 9:35. Wildcats 21–10. Drive: 5 plays, 67 yards, 2:30.
- ACU – Stone Earle 9-yard run (Brandon Perez kick), 0:00. Wildcats 28–10. Drive: 5 plays, 44 yards, 2:49.

Fourth quarter

- TAR – Cody Jackson 25-yard pass from Victor Gabalis (Victor Gabalis pass to T'iar Young), 13:25. Wildcats 28–18. Drive: 3 plays, 57 yards, 1:28.
- TAR – Brad Larson 34-yard field goal, 7:44. Wildcats 28–21. Drive: 10 plays, 53 yards, 4:27.
- TAR – Daniel Greek 1-yard run (Brad Larson kick), 0:56. Tied 28–28. Drive: 8 plays, 72 yards, 1:56.
- ACU – Brandon Perez 47-yard field goal, 0:00. Wildcats 31–28. Drive: 5 plays, 45 yards, 0:56.

Statistics	TAR	ACU
First downs	24	17
Total yards	454	435
Rushing yards	93	233
Passing yards	361	202
Passing: Comp–Att–Int	25–47–1	16–25–1
Time of possession	31:50	28:10

Team	Category	Player	Statistics
Tarleton State	Passing	Victor Gabalis	25/46, 361 yards, 2 TD, INT
Tarleton State	Rushing	James Paige	7 rushes, 76 yards
Tarleton State	Receiving	Cody Jackson	7 receptions, 134 yards, TD
Abilene Christian	Passing	Stone Earle	16/25, 202 yards, TD, INT
Abilene Christian	Rushing	E. J. Wilson	10 rushes, 105 yards
Abilene Christian	Receiving	Dallas Dudley	2 receptions, 45 yards

=== Utah Tech ===
Utah Tech Trailblazers (2–7) at No. 18 Abilene Christian Wildcats (5–4) – Game summary

Quarter	1	2	3	4	Total
Trailblazers	0	7	3	0	10
No. 18 Wildcats	0	14	7	10	31

at Wildcat Stadium • Abilene, Texas

- Date: November 8
- Game time: 2:00 p.m. CST
- Game weather: Sunny, 81 °F (27 °C)
- Game attendance: 7,833
- Referee: Branden McCain
- TV: ESPN+
- Box score, Recap

Game information

First quarter

- No scoring plays

Second quarter

- ACU – Zion Fonua 16-yard interception return (Brandon Perez kick), 12:48. Wildcats 7–0.
- UTU – Asa Chatman 7-yard run (Ilya Uvaydov kick), 7:49. Tied 7–7. Drive: 10 plays, 75 yards, 4:59.
- ACU – Dorian Plumley 10-yard interception return (Brandon Perez kick), 3:43. Wildcats 14–7.

Third quarter

- UTU – Ilya Uvaydov 51-yard field goal, 7:28. Wildcats 14–10. Drive: 9 plays, 34 yards, 4:22.
- ACU – E. J. Wilson 36-yard run (Brandon Perez kick), 3:39. Wildcats 21–10. Drive: 8 plays, 75 yards, 3:49.

Fourth quarter

- ACU – Brandon Perez 31-yard field goal, 12:33. Wildcats 24–10. Drive: 7 plays, 18 yards, 3:02.
- ACU – Raydrian Baltrip 16-yard pass from Quayde Hawkins (Brandon Perez kick), 3:03. Wildcats 31–10. Drive: 10 plays, 85 yards, 5:21.

Statistics	UTU	ACU
First downs	12	19
Total yards	252	392
Rushing yards	113	202
Passing yards	139	190
Passing: Comp–Att–Int	18–34–4	19–31–0
Time of possession	28:36	31:24

Team	Category	Player	Statistics
Utah Tech	Passing	Bronson Barben	18/33, 139 yards, 4 INT
Utah Tech	Rushing	Asa Chatman	13 rushes, 49 yards, TD
Utah Tech	Receiving	Daniel Thomason	4 receptions, 33 yards
Abilene Christian	Passing	Stone Earle	17/29, 156 yards
Abilene Christian	Rushing	E. J. Wilson	15 rushes, 96 yards, TD
Abilene Christian	Receiving	J. B. Mitchell III	2 receptions, 46 yards

=== at Eastern Kentucky ===
No. 18 Abilene Christian Wildcats (6–4) at Eastern Kentucky Colonels (4–6) – Game summary

Quarter	1	2	3	4	Total
No. 18 Wildcats	-	-	-	-	0
Colonels	-	-	-	-	0

at Roy Kidd Stadium • Richmond, Kentucky

- Date: November 15
- Game time: 2:00 p.m. CST/3:00 p.m. EST
- TV: ESPN+

Statistics	ACU	EKU
First downs		
Total yards		
Rushing yards		
Passing yards		
Passing: Comp–Att–Int		
Time of possession		

Team	Category	Player	Statistics
Abilene Christian	Passing		
Abilene Christian	Rushing		
Abilene Christian	Receiving		
Eastern Kentucky	Passing		
Eastern Kentucky	Rushing		
Eastern Kentucky	Receiving		

=== at Central Arkansas ===
No. 17 Abilene Christian Wildcats (7-4) at Central Arkansas Bears (3-8) – Game summary

Quarter	1	2	3	4	Total
No. 17 Wildcats	-	-	-	-	0
Bears	-	-	-	-	0

at Estes Stadium • Conway, Arkansas

- Date: November 22
- Game time: 4:00 p.m. CST
- TV: ESPN+

Statistics	ACU	CARK
First downs		
Total yards		
Rushing yards		
Passing yards		
Passing: Comp–Att–Int		
Time of possession		

Team	Category	Player	Statistics
Abilene Christian	Passing		
Abilene Christian	Rushing		
Abilene Christian	Receiving		
Central Arkansas	Passing		
Central Arkansas	Rushing		
Central Arkansas	Receiving		

== Roster ==
2025 Abilene Christian Wildcats football team roster
Players
Coaches
Offense

Pos.	#	Name	Class
WR	1	J. J. Henry	Sr
WR	2	Hut Graham	Jr
RB	3	Rovaughn Banks Jr.	Jr
QB	4	Stone Earle	Sr
WR	5	J. B. Mitchell III	Sr
QB	6	Cade Fennegan	Sr
WR	7	Javon Gibson	Sr
WR	8	Jeshari Houston	Sr
QB	9	John David Black	Fr
QB	12	Quayde Hawkins	Sr
WR	13	Dallas Dudley	Jr
WR	14	Raydrian Baltrip	Fr
WR	15	Mikele Nash	Sr
WR	16	Luke Moffitt	So
WR	17	Vilay Nakkoun Jr.	So
WR	18	Langston Anderson	Sr
RB	20	B. K. Jackson	Sr
RB	21	Deonte Dean	Fr
RB	22	E. J. Wilson	Sr
RB	26	Jordon Vaughn	Sr
OL	54	Kaden Carr	So
OL	56	Caleb Roach	Fr
OL	58	Shane Pond	Sr
OL	59	Landon Roaten	Jr
OL	62	Luke Roaten	Jr
OL	67	Nathan Humphrey	Fr
OL	68	Colter Lynch	So
OL	69	Brady Stephenson	Fr
OL	70	Sutton Peck	Fr
OL	71	Luke Farr	Fr
C	72	River Gordon	Sr
OL	75	Cameron Vann	Fr
OL	76	Joziah Fogle	Sr
OL	77	George French II	Sr
TE	80	Carson May	Jr
WR	81	Grant Jones	Fr
WR	82	Brady McAdoo	Fr
TE	83	Nathan Jones	Jr
WR	84	Blake Pruitt	So
WR	85	Brelon Badon	Fr
TE	86	Chidubem Lebechi	Jr
TE	87	Itty Henry	Jr
TE	88	Jed Castles	Sr
WR	89	Blake Suber	Fr

Defense

Pos.	#	Name	Class
LB	0	Darius Moore	Sr
LB	1	Will Schafer	Sr
DB	2	Jordan Mukes	Sr
S	3	Dorian Plumley	Sr
DB	4	Tyson Williams	Jr
DB	5	Jocelyn Malaska	Jr
LB	6	Jameer Dudley	Jr
S	7	T. J. Marshall	Sr
LB	8	Chris Wright	Sr
DL	9	Alex Bowman Jr.	Jr
DB	12	DeAngelo Ponder	So
LB	13	Gabe Brown	Jr
LB	14	Rashon Myles Jr.	Jr
DB	15	Sam Mason Jr.	Jr
LB	17	Micho Lavine	Fr
DB	18	Christian Oku	Fr
S	19	Zack Haaland	Sr
DB	20	Noah Mangham	Jr
DB	21	Carson Finney	So
DB	22	Javeon Wilcox	So
LB	23	Zion Fonua	Jr
LB	24	Bryce Morton	So
DB	25	Sammy Morris IV	Sr
DB	27	Harold West	Sr
S	29	Romario Neal	Sr
S	32	Joshua Mallard	Fr
LB	36	Jailyn Gibbs	Fr
LB	37	Trace Low	So
LB	40	West Wilson	So
DL	46	Isaiah Crawford	So
DB	48	Leighton Adams	Fr
DL	51	Okello Okello	Fr
LB	52	Boone Morris	Fr
DL	90	Kaghen Roach	GS
DL	91	Colt Cooper	Sr
DL	92	Paul Blair	Fr
DL	93	Chris Herpin	Jr
DL	94	Cuvanti Crawford	Fr
DL	95	Kortlin Rausaw	Sr
DL	96	Cameron Jones	Sr
DL	97	Lakion Fowler	Jr
DL	99	Cayven Hull	Fr

Special teams

Pos.	#	Name	Class
P	33	Hugo Nash	Jr
LS	35	Braden Hawkins	Fr
K	38	Brandon Perez	Jr
K	39	Kyler Meschi	So
K	43	Giovanni Cardenas	Fr
P	47	Will Chipman	Fr
LS	50	Justin Duff	Sr

Head coach

- Keith Patterson

Coordinators/assistant coaches

- Graham Harrell
  Associate head coach/Co-offensive coordinator/Quarterbacks
- Nick Holt
  Associate head coach/Co-defensive coordinator/Defensive line
- Joel Filani
  Co-offensive coordinator/Wide receivers
- Conor Dubin
  Linebackers
- Ryan Pugh
  Offensive line
- Jason Smith
  Running backs
- D. J. Williams
  Cornerbacks
- Ty Morris
  Special teams coordinator/Safeties
- Stanton Keane
  Tight ends

Legend

- (C) Team captain
- (S) Suspended
- (I) Ineligible
- Injured
- Redshirt

Roster
Last update: November 13, 2025
