= 2025 Tarleton State Texans football team =

American college football season

2025 Tarleton State Texans football

UAC co-champion

NCAA Division I Quarterfinal, L 21–26 vs. Villanova
- Conference: United Athletic Conference

Ranking
- STATS: No. 6
- FCS Coaches: No. 6
- Record: 12–2 (7–1 UAC)
- Head coach: Todd Whitten (16th season)
- Offensive coordinator: Adam Austin (2nd season)
- Co-offensive coordinator: Scott Carey (2nd season)
- Offensive scheme: Pro spread
- Defensive coordinator: Tyrone Nix (4th season)
- Base defense: 4–3
- Home stadium: Memorial Stadium

2025 United Athletic Conference standings
	Conf.			Overall
Team	W		L	W		L
No. 12 Abilene Christian +^	7	–	1	9	–	5
No. 6 Tarleton State +^	7	–	1	12	–	2
Southern Utah	6	–	2	7	–	5
West Georgia*	5	–	3	8	–	3
Austin Peay	4	–	4	7	–	5
Eastern Kentucky	3	–	5	5	–	7
Central Arkansas	2	–	6	3	–	9
Utah Tech	1	–	7	2	–	10
North Alabama	1	–	7	2	–	10
+ – Conference co-champions; ^ – FCS playoff participant; * – Ineligible for the UAC title and FCS postseason play due to transition from NCAA Division II.; Rankings from STATS Poll

The 2025 Tarleton State Texans football team represented Tarleton State University as a member of the United Athletic Conference (UAC) during the 2025 NCAA Division I FCS football season. The Texans were led by sixteenth-year head coach Todd Whitten and played at Memorial Stadium in Stephenville, Texas.

The Tarleton State Texans drew an average home attendance of 20,841, the 6th-highest of all NCAA Division I FCS football teams.

== Schedule ==
Date	Time	Opponent	Rank	Site	TV	Result	Attendance
August 23	3:30 p.m.	at Portland State*	No. 10	Hillsboro Stadium; Hillsboro, OR	ESPN2	W 42–0	1,890
August 29	5:00 p.m.	at Army*	No. 10	Michie Stadium; West Point, NY	CBSSN	W 30–27 ^{2OT}	23,032
September 6	6:00 p.m.	Mississippi Valley State*	No. 5	Memorial Stadium; Stephenville, TX	ESPN+	W 59–3	21,330
September 13	6:00 p.m.	at Central Arkansas	No. 3	Estes Stadium; Conway, AR	ESPN+	W 56–10	6,374
September 20	6:00 p.m.	Chattanooga*	No. 3	Memorial Stadium; Stephenville, TX	ESPN+	W 52–24	23,732
October 4	6:00 p.m.	Southern Utah	No. 3	Memorial Stadium; Stephenville, TX	ESPN+	W 52–42	16,412
October 11	7:00 p.m.	at Utah Tech	No. 3	Greater Zion Stadium; St. George, UT	ESPN+	W 41–23	3,818
October 18	6:00 p.m.	West Georgia^{†}	No. 3	Memorial Stadium; Stephenville, TX	ESPN+	W 45–10	24,012
October 25	2:00 p.m.	at Eastern Kentucky	No. 3	Roy Kidd Stadium; Richmond, KY	ESPN+	W 31–7	6,448
November 1	3:00 p.m.	at No. 24 Abilene Christian	No. 2	Wildcat Stadium; Abilene, TX	ESPN+	L 28–31	12,000
November 15	6:00 p.m.	North Alabama	No. 6	Memorial Stadium; Stephenville, TX	ESPN+	W 61–0	21,067
November 22	4:00 p.m.	Austin Peay	No. 5	Memorial Stadium; Stephenville, TX	ESPN+	W 45–44 ^{OT}	18,488
December 6	12:00 p.m.	No. 19 North Dakota*	No. 5	Memorial Stadium; Stephenville, TX (NCAA Division I Second Round)	ESPN+	W 31–13	19,742
December 13	11:00 a.m.	No. 9 Villanova*	No. 5	Memorial Stadium; Stephenville, TX (NCAA Division I Quarterfinal)	ESPN	L 21–26	19,126
*Non-conference game; ^{†}Homecoming; Rankings from STATS Poll released prior to the game; All times are in Central time

== Rankings ==
Ranking movements Legend: ██ Increase in ranking ██ Decrease in ranking т = Tied with team above or below ( ) = First-place votes
	Week														
Poll	Pre	1	2	3	4	5	6	7	8	9	10	11	12	13	Final
STATS	10	5	3	3	3 (1)	3 (1)	3 (1)	3	3	2	6	6	5	5	6
Coaches	8	3т (1)	3	3	3	3	3	3	3	2	7	5	5	5	6

== Game summaries ==
=== at Portland State ===
No. 10 Tarleton State Texans (0–0) at Portland State Vikings (0–0) – Game summary

Quarter	1	2	3	4	Total
No. 10 Texans	7	7	14	14	42
Vikings	0	0	0	0	0

at Hillsboro Stadium • Hillsboro, Oregon

- Date: August 23
- Game time: 3:30 p.m. CDT / 1:30 p.m. PDT
- Game weather: Sunny • Temperature: 97 °F (36 °C) • Wind: NE at 5 miles per hour (8.0 km/h)
- Game attendance: 1,890
- Referee: Spencer Mumford
- TV announcers (ESPN2): Jorge Sedano (play-by-play), Rodney McLeod (analyst), and Victoria Arlen (sideline reporter)
- Box score, Recap

Game information

First quarter

- TAR – Tre Page III 28-yard run (Corbin Poston kick), 7:25. Texans 7–0. Drive: 3 plays, 49 yards, 0:59.

Second quarter

- TAR – Tre Page III 89-yard run (Corbin Poston kick), 10:49. Texans 14–0. Drive: 1 play, 89 yards, 0:15.

Third quarter

- TAR – Dawson Hearne 14-yard pass from Victor Gabalis (Corbin Poston kick), 6:02. Texans 21–0. Drive: 6 plays, 88 yards, 2:57.
- TAR – Danny Joiner 4-yard pass from Victor Gabalis (Corbin Poston kick), 4:04. Texans 28–0. Drive: 4 plays, 29 yards, 1:50.

Fourth quarter

- TAR – Omar Emmons 37-yard interception return (Corbin Poston kick), 12:21. Texans 35–0.
- TAR – Caleb Lewis 8-yard run (Corbin Poston kick), 2:53. Texans 42–0. Drive: 12 plays, 75 yards, 6:51.

Statistics	TAR	PRST
First downs	22	17
Plays–yards	63–453	64–277
Rushes–yards	38–301	29–108
Passing yards	152	169
Passing: Comp–Att–Int	14–25–0	18–35–3
Turnovers	1	4
Time of possession	27:38	32:22

Team	Category	Player	Statistics
Tarleton State	Passing	Victor Gabalis	14/24, 152 yards, 2 TD
Tarleton State	Rushing	Tre Page III	15 carries, 170 yards, 2 TD
Tarleton State	Receiving	Cody Jackson	4 receptions, 96 yards
Portland State	Passing	Gabe Downing	10/17, 91 yards, 2 INT
Portland State	Rushing	Delon Thompson	17 carries, 55 yards
Portland State	Receiving	Branden Alvarez	6 receptions, 72 yards

=== at Army (FBS) ===
No. 10 Tarleton State Texans (1-0) at Army Black Knights (FBS) (0-0) – Game summary

Quarter	1	2	3	4	OT	2OT	Total
No. 10 Texans	3	7	7	7	3	3	30
Black Knights (FBS)	7	10	7	0	3	0	27

at Michie Stadium • West Point, New York

- Date: August 29
- Game time: 5:00 p.m. CDT / 6:00 p.m. EDT
- Game weather: Cloudy • Temperature: 70 °F (21 °C) • Wind: 10 miles per hour (16 km/h)
- Game attendance: 23,032
- Referee: Reid Jackson
- TV announcers (CBSSN): Dave Ryan, Adam Breneman, Tina Cervasio
- Box score, Recap

Game information

First quarter

- TAR – Brad Larson 30-yard field goal, 8:05. Texans 3–0. Drive: 12 plays, 65 yards, 5:02.
- ARMY – Dewayne Coleman 36-yard run (Dawson Jones kick), 4:08. Black Knights 7–3. Drive: 7 plays, 75 yards, 3:57.

Second quarter

- TAR – Tre Page III 10-yard run (Brad Larson kick), 9:43. Texans 10–7. Drive: 12 plays, 90 yards, 4:29.
- ARMY – Dawson Jones 24-yard field goal, 1:47. Tied 10–10. Drive: 15 plays, 67 yards, 7:49.
- ARMY – Cale Hellums 1-yard run (Dawson Jones kick), 0:15. Black Knights 17–10. Drive: 5 plays, 39 yards, 0:45.

Third quarter

- ARMY – Hayden Reed 37-yard run (Dawson Jones kick), 8:14. Black Knights 24–10. Drive: 6 plays, 65 yards, 2:53.
- TAR – Caleb Lewis 6-yard run (Brad Larson kick), 5:15. Black Knights 24–17. Drive: 7 plays, 75 yards, 2:59.

Fourth quarter

- TAR – Dawson Hearne 15-yard pass from Victor Gabalis (Brad Larson kick), 9:05. Tied 24–24. Drive: 3 plays, 20 yards, 0:50.

Overtime

- TAR – Brad Larson 28-yard field goal. Texans 27–24. Drive: 8 plays, 14 yards.
- ARMY – Dawson Jones 40-yard field goal. Tied 27–27. Drive: 4 plays, 7 yards.

Double overtime

- TAR – Brad Larson 37-yard field goal. Texans 30–27. Drive: 4 plays, 5 yards.

Statistics	TAR	ARMY
First downs	16	24
Plays–yards	72–344	82–411
Rushes–yards	42–192	66–280
Passing yards	152	131
Passing: comp–att–int	16–30–0	8–16–2
Turnovers	0	3
Time of possession	23:26	36:34

Team	Category	Player	Statistics
Tarleton State	Passing	Victor Gabalis	16/30, 152 yards, TD
Tarleton State	Rushing	Caleb Lewis	20 carries, 107 yards, TD
Tarleton State	Receiving	Cody Jackson	6 receptions, 53 yards
Army	Passing	Dewayne Coleman	7/12, 129 yards, 2 INT
Army	Rushing	Dewayne Coleman	24 carries, 100 yards, TD
Army	Receiving	Noah Short	6 receptions, 81 yards

This was the Texans' second ever win over an FBS program, knocking off the defending American Athletic Conference champion and snapping Army's nine-game home winning streak.

=== Mississippi Valley State ===
Mississippi Valley State Delta Devils (0-1) at No. 5 Tarleton State Texans (2-0) – Game summary

Quarter	1	2	3	4	Total
Delta Devils	0	3	0	0	3
No. 5 Texans	7	24	28	0	59

at Memorial Stadium • Stephenville, Texas

- Date: September 6
- Game time: 6:00 p.m. CDT
- TV announcers (ESPN+): John Liddle (play-by-play), Hek'ma Harrison (analyst) and Kendra Sheehan (sideline)
- Box score, Recap

Statistics	MVSU	TAR
First downs		
Total yards		
Rushing yards		
Passing yards		
Passing: Comp–Att–Int		
Time of possession		

Team	Category	Player	Statistics
Mississippi Valley State	Passing		
Mississippi Valley State	Rushing		
Mississippi Valley State	Receiving		
Tarleton State	Passing		
Tarleton State	Rushing		
Tarleton State	Receiving		

=== at Central Arkansas ===
No. 3 Tarleton State Texans (3-0) at Central Arkansas Bears (1-1) – Game summary

Quarter	1	2	3	4	Total
No. 3 Texans	21	21	7	7	56
Bears	0	7	0	3	10

at Estes Stadium • Conway, Arkansas

- Date: September 13
- Game time: 6:00 p.m. CDT
- TV announcers (ESPN+): Dylan McLemore (play-by-play) and Wess Moore (analyst)
- Box score, Recap

Statistics	TAR	CARK
First downs		
Total yards		
Rushing yards		
Passing yards		
Passing: Comp–Att–Int		
Time of possession		

Team	Category	Player	Statistics
Tarleton State	Passing		
Tarleton State	Rushing		
Tarleton State	Receiving		
Central Arkansas	Passing		
Central Arkansas	Rushing		
Central Arkansas	Receiving		

=== Chattanooga ===
Chattanooga Mocs (1-2) at No. 3 Tarleton State Texans (4-0) – Game summary

Quarter	1	2	3	4	Total
Mocs	14	0	3	7	24
No. 3 Texans	10	20	15	7	52

at Memorial Stadium • Stephenville, Texas

- Date: September 20
- Game time: 6:00 p.m. CDT / 7:00 p.m. EDT
- TV announcers (ESPN+): John Liddle (play-by-play), LaDarrin McLane (analyst) and Laura Sadler (sideline)

Statistics	UTC	TAR
First downs		
Total yards		
Rushing yards		
Passing yards		
Passing: Comp–Att–Int		
Time of possession		

Team	Category	Player	Statistics
Chattanooga	Passing		
Chattanooga	Rushing		
Chattanooga	Receiving		
Tarleton State	Passing		
Tarleton State	Rushing		
Tarleton State	Receiving		

=== Southern Utah ===
Southern Utah Thunderbirds (1-4) at No. 3 Tarleton State Texans (5-0) – Game summary

Quarter	1	2	3	4	Total
Thunderbirds	14	21	7	0	42
No. 3 Texans	14	14	17	7	52

at Memorial Stadium • Stephenville, Texas

- Date: October 4
- Game time: 6:00 p.m. CDT / 5:00 p.m. MDT
- TV announcers (ESPN+): Kyle Youmans (play-by-play), Hek'ma Harrison (analyst) and Kendra Sheehan (sideline)

Statistics	SUU	TAR
First downs		
Total yards		
Rushing yards		
Passing yards		
Passing: Comp–Att–Int		
Time of possession		

Team	Category	Player	Statistics
Southern Utah	Passing		
Southern Utah	Rushing		
Southern Utah	Receiving		
Tarleton State	Passing		
Tarleton State	Rushing		
Tarleton State	Receiving		

=== at Utah Tech ===
No. 3 Tarleton State Texans (6-0) at Utah Tech Trailblazers (1-5) – Game summary

Quarter	1	2	3	4	Total
No. 3 Texans	13	7	7	14	41
Trailblazers	7	6	3	7	23

at Greater Zion Stadium • St. George, Utah

- Date: October 11

Statistics	TAR	UTU
First downs		
Total yards		
Rushing yards		
Passing yards		
Passing: Comp–Att–Int		
Time of possession		

Team	Category	Player	Statistics
Tarleton State	Passing		
Tarleton State	Rushing		
Tarleton State	Receiving		
Utah Tech	Passing		
Utah Tech	Rushing		
Utah Tech	Receiving		

=== West Georgia ===
West Georgia Wolves (5-2) at No. 3 Tarleton State Texans (7-0) – Game summary

Quarter	1	2	3	4	Total
Wolves	0	0	3	7	10
No. 3 Texans	7	17	7	14	45

at Memorial Stadium • Stephenville, Texas

- Date: October 18

Statistics	UWG	TAR
First downs		
Total yards		
Rushing yards		
Passing yards		
Passing: Comp–Att–Int		
Time of possession		

Team	Category	Player	Statistics
West Georgia	Passing		
West Georgia	Rushing		
West Georgia	Receiving		
Tarleton State	Passing		
Tarleton State	Rushing		
Tarleton State	Receiving		

=== at Eastern Kentucky ===
No. 3 Tarleton State Texans (8-0) at Eastern Kentucky Colonels (3-4) – Game summary

Quarter	1	2	3	4	Total
No. 3 Texans	7	3	21	0	31
Colonels	0	7	0	0	7

at Roy Kidd Stadium • Richmond, Kentucky

- Date: October 25

Statistics	TAR	EKU
First downs		
Total yards		
Rushing yards		
Passing yards		
Passing: Comp–Att–Int		
Time of possession		

Team	Category	Player	Statistics
Tarleton State	Passing		
Tarleton State	Rushing		
Tarleton State	Receiving		
Eastern Kentucky	Passing		
Eastern Kentucky	Rushing		
Eastern Kentucky	Receiving		

=== at No. 24 Abilene Christian ===
No. 2 Tarleton State Texans (9-0) at No. 24 Abilene Christian Wildcats (4-4) – Game summary

Quarter	1	2	3	4	Total
No. 2 Texans	-	-	-	-	0
No. 24 Wildcats	-	-	-	-	0

at Wildcat Stadium • Abilene, Texas

- Date: November 1

Statistics	TAR	ACU
First downs		
Total yards		
Rushing yards		
Passing yards		
Passing: Comp–Att–Int		
Time of possession		

Team	Category	Player	Statistics
Tarleton State	Passing		
Tarleton State	Rushing		
Tarleton State	Receiving		
Abilene Christian	Passing		
Abilene Christian	Rushing		
Abilene Christian	Receiving		

=== North Alabama ===
North Alabama Lions (2-8) at No. 6 Tarleton State Texans (9-1) – Game summary

Quarter	1	2	3	4	Total
Lions	-	-	-	-	0
No. 6 Texans	-	-	-	-	0

at Memorial Stadium • Stephenville, Texas

- Date: November 15

Statistics	UNA	TAR
First downs		
Total yards		
Rushing yards		
Passing yards		
Passing: Comp–Att–Int		
Time of possession		

Team	Category	Player	Statistics
North Alabama	Passing		
North Alabama	Rushing		
North Alabama	Receiving		
Tarleton State	Passing		
Tarleton State	Rushing		
Tarleton State	Receiving		

=== Austin Peay ===
Austin Peay Governors (7-4) at No. 5 Tarleton State Texans (10-1) – Game summary

Quarter	1	2	3	4	Total
Governors	-	-	-	-	0
No. 5 Texans	-	-	-	-	0

at Memorial Stadium • Stephenville, Texas

- Date: November 22

Statistics	APSU	TAR
First downs		
Total yards		
Rushing yards		
Passing yards		
Passing: Comp–Att–Int		
Time of possession		

Team	Category	Player	Statistics
Austin Peay	Passing		
Austin Peay	Rushing		
Austin Peay	Receiving		
Tarleton State	Passing		
Tarleton State	Rushing		
Tarleton State	Receiving		

=== No. 9 Villanova (Division I Quarterfinal) ===
2025 NCAA Division I FCS Playoffs Quarterfinal
No. 9 (12) Villanova Wildcats (11–2) at No. 5 (4) Tarleton State Texans (12–1) – Game summary

Quarter	1	2	3	4	Total
No. 9 (12) Wildcats	0	12	7	7	26
No. 5 (4) Texans	14	0	7	0	21

at Memorial Stadium • Stephenville, Texas

- Date: December 13
- Game time: 12:00 p.m. EST
- Game weather: Sunny
- Game attendance: 19,126
- Referee: Kelly Holman
- TV announcers (ESPN): Lowell Galindo (play-by-play) and Aaron Murray (analyst)

Game information

First quarter

- TAR – Peyton Kramer 80-yard pass from Victor Gabalis (Brad Larson kick), 11:32. Texans 7–0. Drive: 1 play, 80 yards, 0:11.
- TAR – Daniel Greek 1-yard run (Brad Larson kick), 7:30. Texans 14–0. Drive: 5 plays, 12 yards, 2:37.

Second quarter

- VILL – Jack Barnum 31-yard field goal, 12:52. Texans 14–3. Drive: 16 plays, 57 yards, 9:34.
- VILL – Lucas Kopecky 27-yard pass from Braden Reed (Jack Barnum kick BLOCKED), 11:20. Texans 14–9. Drive: 3 plays, 45 yards, 1:16.
- VILL – Jack Barnum 42-yard field goal, 1:40. Texans 14–12. Drive: 8 plays, 34 yards, 2:58.

Third quarter

- TAR – Trevon West 15-yard pass from Victor Gabalis (Brad Larson kick), 12:35. Texans 21–12. Drive: 5 plays, 68 yards, 2:00.
- VILL – Ja'briel Mace 47-yard run (Jack Barnum kick), 11:46. Texans 21–19. Drive: 2 plays, 68 yards, 0:45.

Fourth quarter

- VILL – Braden Reed 11-yard pass from Pat McQuaide (Jack Barnum kick), 12:49. Wildcats 26–21. Drive: 12 plays, 78 yards, 7:08.

Statistics	VILL	TAR
First downs	23	17
Plays–yards	72–426	54–266
Rushes–yards	38–219	31–56
Passing yards	207	210
Passing: Comp–Att–Int	17–34–1	12–23–1
Turnovers	1	1
Time of possession	33:33	26:27

Team	Category	Player	Statistics
Villanova	Passing	Pat McQuaide	16/33, 180 yards, TD, INT
Villanova	Rushing	Ja'briel Mace	18 carries, 151 yards, TD
Villanova	Receiving	Luke Colella	5 receptions, 71 yards
Tarleton State	Passing	Victor Gabalis	12/23, 210 yards, 2 TD, INT
Tarleton State	Rushing	Tylan Hines	19 carries, 75 yards
Tarleton State	Receiving	Peyton Kramer	4 receptions, 104 yards, TD
