= Chris Parson (American football) =

American football player (born 2004)

No. 3 – Austin Peay Governors
- Position: Quarterback
- Class: Redshirt Sophomore

Personal information
- Born: July 22, 2004 (age 22)
- Listed height: 6 ft 0 in (1.83 m)
- Listed weight: 210 lb (95 kg)

Career information
- High school: Ravenwood (Brentwood, Tennessee)
- College: Mississippi State (2023–2024); Austin Peay (2025–present)

Awards and highlights
- First-team All-SEC Freshman (2023)
- Stats at ESPN

Christopher Bernard Parson (born July 22, 2004) is an American college football quarterback for the Austin Peay Governors. He previously played for the Mississippi State Bulldogs.

== Early life ==
Parson attended Ravenwood High School in Brentwood, Tennessee. As a sophomore, he threw for 541 yards and four touchdowns while also rushing for 488 yards and 11 touchdowns at Red Oak High School before transferring to Ravenwood prior to his junior year. As a junior, Parson totaled 2,309 passing yards and 25 touchdowns while rushing for another 1,007 yards and 17 touchdowns. Following his junior season, he was selected to participate in the 2022 Elite 11. As a senior, Parson threw for 1,041 yards and five touchdowns and rushed for 519 yards and five touchdowns before his season was ended prematurely due to injury. A four-star recruit, he committed to play college football at Mississippi State University.

== College career ==
Parson entered his true freshman season as the backup quarterback behind Will Rogers and Mike Wright. He made his first career start against Texas A&M, completing five passes for 36 yards with three interceptions. Parson was named to SEC All-Freshman Team following the season. He played sparingly in 2024, before entering the transfer portal.

On December 18, 2024, Parson announced his decision to transfer to Austin Peay State University. He was named the Governors' starting quarterback entering the 2025 season. Against Utah Tech, Parson accounted for 286 total yards and four touchdowns, being named the UAC Offensive Player of the Week. Against Tarleton State, he set the school record for single-game total offense with 487 total yards in a 45–44 overtime defeat. Parson finished the 2025 season throwing for 3,003 yards and 23 touchdowns, while also rushing for 743 yards and 14 touchdowns. He was named a finalist for the Walter Payton Award following the season.

=== Statistics ===
Season	Team	Games			Passing								Rushing			
Season	Team	GP	GS	Record	Cmp	Att	Pct	Yds	Y/A	TD	Int	Rtg	Att	Yds	Avg	TD
2023	Mississippi State	2	1	0–1	11	26	42.3	103	4.0	0	3	52.5	9	-9	-1.0	0
2024	Mississippi State	4	0	0–0	0	2	0.0	0	0.0	0	0	0.0	8	31	3.9	0
2025	Austin Peay	12	12	7−5	206	326	63.2	3,003	9.2	23	5	160.8	168	743	4.4	14
2026	Austin Peay	10	10	8−2	139	224	62.1	2,175	9.7	15	2	163.9	129	537	4.2	11
Career		28	23	15–8	356	578	61.6	5,281	9.1	38	10	156.6	314	1,302	4.1	25
