= 2025 Austin Peay Governors football team =

American college football season

2025 Austin Peay Governors football
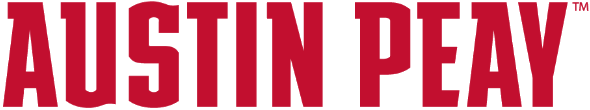
- Conference: United Athletic Conference
- Record: 7–5 (4–4 UAC)
- Head coach: Jeff Faris (2nd season)
- Offensive coordinator: Quinn Billerman (2nd season)
- Defensive coordinator: Greg Jones (1st season)
- Home stadium: Fortera Stadium

2025 United Athletic Conference standings
	Conf.			Overall
Team	W		L	W		L
No. 12 Abilene Christian +^	7	–	1	9	–	5
No. 6 Tarleton State +^	7	–	1	12	–	2
Southern Utah	6	–	2	7	–	5
West Georgia*	5	–	3	8	–	3
Austin Peay	4	–	4	7	–	5
Eastern Kentucky	3	–	5	5	–	7
Central Arkansas	2	–	6	3	–	9
Utah Tech	1	–	7	2	–	10
North Alabama	1	–	7	2	–	10
+ – Conference co-champions; ^ – FCS playoff participant; * – Ineligible for the UAC title and FCS postseason play due to transition from NCAA Division II.; Rankings from STATS Poll

The 2025 Austin Peay Governors football team represented Austin Peay State University as a member of the United Athletic Conference (UAC) during the 2025 NCAA Division I FCS football season. The Governors were coached by second-year head coach Jeff Faris and played at Fortera Stadium in Clarksville, Tennessee.

== Schedule ==
Date	Time	Opponent	Rank	Site	TV	Result	Attendance
August 30	6:00 p.m.	at Middle Tennessee*		Johnny "Red" Floyd Stadium; Murfreesboro, TN	ESPN+	W 34–14	18,505
September 6	2:30 p.m.	at No. 4 (FBS) Georgia*		Sanford Stadium; Athens, GA	SECN+/ESPN+	L 6–28	93,033
September 13	6:00 p.m.	Morehead State*	No. 22	Fortera Stadium; Clarksville, TN	ESPN+	W 56–7	7,152
September 20	7:00 p.m.	at No. 14 Abilene Christian	No. 18	Wildcat Stadium; Abilene, TX	ESPN+	L 31–45	10,133
September 27	1:00 p.m.	Utah Tech	No. 18	Fortera Stadium; Clarksville, TN	ESPN+	W 42–10	6,433
October 4	3:00 p.m.	No. 16 West Georgia	No. 22	Fortera Stadium; Clarksville, TN	ESPN+	W 44–30	6,582
October 11	5:00 p.m.	at Eastern Kentucky	No. 16	Roy Kidd Stadium; Richmond, KY	ESPN+	L 20–34	5,753
October 25	3:00 p.m.	North Alabama^{†}	No. 25	Fortera Stadium; Clarksville, TN	ESPN+	W 56–28	7,773
November 1	7:30 p.m.	at Southern Utah	No. 22	Eccles Coliseum; Cedar City, UT	ESPN+	L 17–33	2,808
November 8	3:00 p.m.	Central Arkansas		Fortera Stadium; Clarksville, TN	ESPN+	W 41–38	5,345
November 15	1:00 p.m.	Samford*		Fortera Stadium; Clarksville, TN	ESPN+	W 30–16	6,751
November 22	4:00 p.m.	at No. 5 Tarleton State		Memorial Stadium; Stephenville, TX	ESPN+	L 44–45 ^{OT}	18,488
*Non-conference game; ^{†}Homecoming; Rankings from STATS Poll released prior to the game; All times are in Central time

== Game summaries ==
=== at Middle Tennessee (FBS) ===
Austin Peay Governors (0-0) at Middle Tennessee Blue Raiders (FBS) (0-0) – Game summary

Quarter	1	2	3	4	Total
Governors	14	7	3	10	34
Blue Raiders (FBS)	0	7	7	0	14

at Johnny "Red" Floyd Stadium • Murfreesboro, TN

- Date: August 30
- Game time: 6:00 PM CDT
- Game weather: Wind: NW at 12 miles per hour (19 km/h) • Weather: Sunny • Temp: 83 °F (28 °C)
- Game attendance: 18,505
- TV announcers (ESPN+): Jake Rose, Jeremy Kellem, and Justin Beasley

Game information

First quarter

- APSU – Jaden Robinson 22-yard pass from Chris Parson (Carson Smith kick), 9:45. Governors 7–0. Drive: 7 plays, 63 yards, 3:51.
- APSU – Courtland Simmons 1-yard run (Carson Smith kick), 2:38. Governors 14–0. Drive: 8 plays, 53 yards, 3:06.

Second quarter

- APSU – Jackson Head 4-yard pass from Chris Parson (Carson Smith kick), 6:03. Governors 21–0. Drive: 17 plays, 89 yards, 9:30.
- MTSU – Nahzae Cox 5-yard pass from Nicholas Vattiato (Jacob Hathaway kick), 0:45. Governors 21–7. Drive: 6 plays, 67 yards, 1:34.

Third quarter

- APSU – Carson Smith 40-yard field goal, 11:04. Governors 24–7. Drive: 9 plays, 52 yards, 3:56.
- MTSU – Nahzae Cox 14-yard pass from Nicholas Vattiato (Jacob Hathaway kick), 2:56. Governors 24–14. Drive: 5 plays, 44 yards, 2:06.

Fourth quarter

- APSU – Carson Smith 36-yard field goal, 12:48. Governors 27–14. Drive: 5 plays, 25 yards, 2:07.
- APSU – Austin Smith 2-yard run (Carson Smith kick), 7:42. Governors 34–14. Drive: 7 plays, 28 yards, 3:52.

Statistics	APSU	MTSU
First downs	19	13
Plays–yards	74–343	59–153
Rushes–yards	47–150	22–44
Passing yards	193	109
Passing: Comp–Att–Int	14–27–0	16–37–0
Turnovers	0	0
Time of possession	38:35	21:25

Team	Category	Player	Statistics
Austin Peay	Passing	Chris Parson	11/20, 142 yards, 2 TD
Austin Peay	Rushing	Courtland Simmons	10 carries, 35 yards, TD
Austin Peay	Receiving	Shemar Kirk	3 receptions, 69 yards
Middle Tennessee	Passing	Nicholas Vattiato	15/36, 104 yards, 2 TD
Middle Tennessee	Rushing	Jekail Middlebrook	11 carries, 48 yards
Middle Tennessee	Receiving	Nahzae Cox	6 receptions, 50 yards, 2 TD

The victory marked Austin Peay's first victory over a FBS opponent since their 1987 victory over Kansas State.

=== at No. 4 (FBS) Georgia ===
Austin Peay Governors (1-0) at No. 4 (FBS) Georgia Bulldogs (1-0) – Game summary

Quarter	1	2	3	4	Total
Governors	0	3	3	0	6
No. 4 (FBS) Bulldogs	7	7	7	7	28

at Sanford Stadium • Athens, GA

- Date: September 6
- Game time: 3:30 PM EDT
- Game weather: Cloudy; thunder nearby • Temperature: 83 °F (28 °C) • Wind: N 5 mph
- Game attendance: 93,033
- Referee: Jason McArthur
- TV announcers (SECN+/ESPN+): Clay Matvick, Chase Daniel, and Madison Fitzpatrick

Game information

First quarter

- (5:55) UGA – Chauncey Bowens 2 yard run, Peyton Woodring kick (Drive: 10 plays, 80 yards, 5:16; Georgia 7–0)

Second quarter

- (13:50) UGA – Nate Frazier 2 yard run, Peyton Woodring kick (Drive: 9 plays, 56 yards, 4:56; Georgia 14–0)
- (9:08) APU – Carson Smith 44 yard field goal (Drive: 8 plays, 48 yards, 4:42; Georgia 14–3)

Third quarter

- (10:54) UGA – Chauncey Bowens 14 yard run, Peyton Woodring kick (Drive: 7 plays, 60 yards, 2:41; Georgia 21–3)
- (5:51) APU – Carson Smith 43 yard field goal (Drive: 4 plays, 5 yards, 1:57; Georgia 21–6)

Fourth quarter

- (5:39) UGA – Nate Frazier 1 yard run, Peyton Woodring kick (Drive: 17 plays, 99 yards, 8:43; Georgia 28–6)

Statistics	APSU	UGA
First downs	10	26
Plays–yards	51–196	76–421
Rushes–yards	28–45	40–190
Passing yards	151	231
Passing: comp–att–int	16–23–1	27–36–0
Turnovers	1	2
Time of possession	26:51	33:09

Team	Category	Player	Statistics
Austin Peay	Passing	Chris Parson	16/23, 151 yards, INT
Austin Peay	Rushing	Corey Richardson	7 carries, 33 yards
Austin Peay	Receiving	Kamari Maxwell	3 receptions, 41 yards
Georgia	Passing	Gunner Stockton	26/34, 227 yards
Georgia	Rushing	Nate Frazier	14 carries, 69 yards, 2 TD
Georgia	Receiving	Colbie Young	7 receptions, 76 yards

=== Morehead State ===
Morehead State Eagles (1-1) vs. No. 22 Austin Peay Governors (1-1) – Game summary

Quarter	1	2	3	4	Total
Eagles	0	0	0	7	7
No. 22 Governors	21	21	14	0	56

at Fortera Stadium • Clarksville, TN

- Date: September 13
- Game time: 6:00 p.m. CDT
- Game weather: Sunny • Temperature: 91 °F (33 °C) • Wind: E at 5 miles per hour (8.0 km/h)
- Game attendance: 7,152
- Referee: Bradley Eiras
- TV announcers (ESPN+): Barry Gresham (play-by-play) and Ethan Schmidt (analyst)

Statistics	MORE	APSU
First downs		
Total yards		
Rushing yards		
Passing yards		
Passing: Comp–Att–Int		
Time of possession		

Team	Category	Player	Statistics
Morehead State	Passing		
Morehead State	Rushing		
Morehead State	Receiving		
Austin Peay	Passing		
Austin Peay	Rushing		
Austin Peay	Receiving		

=== at No. 14 Abilene Christian ===
No. 18 Austin Peay Governors (2-1) vs. No. 14 Abilene Christian Wildcats (1-2) – Game summary

Quarter	1	2	3	4	Total
No. 18 Governors	0	3	7	21	31
No. 14 Wildcats	7	17	7	14	45

at Wildcat Stadium • Abilene, TX

- Date: September 20
- Game time: 7:00 p.m. CDT
- Game weather: Sunny
- Game attendance: 10,133
- Referee: Zach Erdmann
- TV announcers (ESPN+): Andy Penney (play-by-play), Jim Reese (analyst) and Kendra Sheehan (sideline)

Game information

First quarter

- ACU – Stone Earle 4-yard run (Brandon Perez kick), 9:34. Wildcats 7–0. Drive: 1 play, 4 yards, 0:04.

Second quarter

- ACU – Raydrian Baltrip 26-yard pass from Stone Earle (Brandon Perez kick), 13:52. Wildcats 14–0. Drive: 7 plays, 63 yards, 3:10.
- APSU – Carson Smith 22-yard field goal, 9:25. Wildcats 14–3. Drive: 11 plays, 63 yards, 4:20.
- ACU – Dallas Dudley 5-yard pass from Stone Earle (Brandon Perez kick), 4:28. Wildcats 21–3. Drive: 6 plays, 22 yards, 2:48.
- ACU – Brandon Perez 23-yard field goal, 0:00. Wildcats 24–3. Drive: 11 plays, 92 yards, 1:07.

Third quarter

- ACU – Jed Castles 4-yard pass from Stone Earle (Brandon Perez kick), 9:13. Wildcats 31–3. Drive: 12 plays, 75 yards, 5:47.
- APSU – Chris Parson 2-yard run (Carson Smith kick), 1:27. Wildcats 31–10. Drive: 4 plays, 58 yards, 2:27.

Fourth quarter

- APSU – Chris Parson 1-yard run (Carson Smith kick), 13:24. Wildcats 31–17. Drive: 7 plays, 60 yards, 2:17.
- ACU – Stone Earle 35-yard run (Brandon Perez kick), 10:25. Wildcats 38–17. Drive: 7 plays, 66 yards, 2:59.
- APSU – Jaden Robinson 44-yard pass from Chris Parson (Carson Smith kick), 8:57. Wildcats 38–24. Drive: 4 plays, 75 yards, 1:28.
- ACU – Raydrian Baltrip 55-yard pass from Stone Earle (Brandon Perez kick), 7:45. Wildcats 45–24. Drive: 4 plays, 75 yards, 1:05.
- APSU – Jackson Head 6-yard pass from Chris Parson (Carson Smith kick), 1:56. Wildcats 45–31. Drive: 16 plays, 75 yards, 5:49.

Statistics	APSU	ACU
First downs	23	22
Total yards	434	432
Rushing yards	104	93
Passing yards	330	339
Passing: Comp–Att–Int	24–39–0	30–42–1
Time of possession	31:54	28:06

Team	Category	Player	Statistics
Austin Peay	Passing	Chris Parson	24/38, 330 yards, 2 TD
Austin Peay	Rushing	Chris Parson	17 carries, 38 yards, 2 TD
Austin Peay	Receiving	Jackson Head	7 receptions, 132 yards, TD
Abilene Christian	Passing	Stone Earle	30/42, 339 yards, 4 TD, INT
Abilene Christian	Rushing	Stone Earle	4 carries, 46 yards, 2 TD
Abilene Christian	Receiving	Raydrian Baltrip	6 receptions, 112 yards, 2 TD

=== Utah Tech ===
Utah Tech Trailblazers (1-3) vs. No. 23 Austin Peay Governors (2-2) – Game summary

Quarter	1	2	3	4	Total
Trailblazers	0	3	0	7	10
No. 23 Governors	7	21	7	7	42

at Fortera Stadium • Clarksville, TN

- Date: September 27
- Game time: 1:00 p.m. CDT
- Game weather: Sunny
- Game attendance: 6,433
- Referee: John Kellermeier
- TV announcers (ESPN+): Barry Gresham (play-by-play) and Ethan Schmidt (analyst)

Statistics	UTU	APSU
First downs		
Total yards		
Rushing yards		
Passing yards		
Passing: Comp–Att–Int		
Time of possession		

Team	Category	Player	Statistics
Utah Tech	Passing		
Utah Tech	Rushing		
Utah Tech	Receiving		
Austin Peay	Passing		
Austin Peay	Rushing		
Austin Peay	Receiving		

=== No. 16 West Georgia ===
No. 16 West Georgia Wolves (5-0) vs. No. 22 Austin Peay Governors (3-2) – Game summary

Quarter	1	2	3	4	Total
No. 16 Wolves	16	0	14	0	30
No. 22 Governors	9	7	14	14	44

at Fortera Stadium • Clarksville, TN

- Date: October 4
- Game time: 3:00 p.m. CDT
- Game weather: Sunny
- Game attendance: 6,582
- Referee: Branden McCain
- TV announcers (ESPN+): Barry Gresham (play-by-play) and Ethan Schmidt (analyst)

Statistics	UWG	APSU
First downs		
Total yards		
Rushing yards		
Passing yards		
Passing: Comp–Att–Int		
Time of possession		

Team	Category	Player	Statistics
West Georgia	Passing		
West Georgia	Rushing		
West Georgia	Receiving		
Austin Peay	Passing		
Austin Peay	Rushing		
Austin Peay	Receiving		

=== at Eastern Kentucky ===
No. 16 Austin Peay Governors (4-2) vs. Eastern Kentucky Colonels (2-3) – Game summary

Quarter	1	2	3	4	Total
No. 16 Governors	7	13	0	0	20
Colonels	7	10	3	14	34

at Roy Kidd Stadium • Richmond, KY

- Date: October 11
- Game time: 5:00 p.m. EDT
- Game weather: Sunny • Temperature: 71 °F (22 °C) • Wind: N at 7 miles per hour (11 km/h)
- Game attendance: 5,753
- Referee: Matthew Jones
- TV announcers (ESPN+): Greg Stotelmyer (play-by-play), Jim Tirey (analyst) and Kendra Sheehan (sideline)

Statistics	APSU	EKU
First downs		
Total yards		
Rushing yards		
Passing yards		
Passing: Comp–Att–Int		
Time of possession		

Team	Category	Player	Statistics
Austin Peay	Passing		
Austin Peay	Rushing		
Austin Peay	Receiving		
Eastern Kentucky	Passing		
Eastern Kentucky	Rushing		
Eastern Kentucky	Receiving		

=== North Alabama ===
North Alabama Lions (2-5) vs. No. 25 Austin Peay Governors (4-3) – Game summary

Quarter	1	2	3	4	Total
Lions	0	7	14	7	28
No. 25 Governors	7	21	14	14	56

at Fortera Stadium • Clarksville, TN

- Date: October 25
- Game time: 3:00 p.m. CDT
- Game weather: Sunny
- Game attendance: 7,773
- Referee: Chris Brison
- TV announcers (ESPN+): Barry Gresham (play-by-play), Ethan Schmidt (analyst) and Kendra Sheehan (sidelinea0

Statistics	UNA	APSU
First downs		
Total yards		
Rushing yards		
Passing yards		
Passing: Comp–Att–Int		
Time of possession		

Team	Category	Player	Statistics
North Alabama	Passing		
North Alabama	Rushing		
North Alabama	Receiving		
Austin Peay	Passing		
Austin Peay	Rushing		
Austin Peay	Receiving		

=== at Southern Utah ===
No. 22 Austin Peay Governors (5-3) vs. Southern Utah Thunderbirds (3-5) – Game summary

Quarter	1	2	3	4	Total
No. 22 Governors	-	-	-	-	0
Thunderbirds	-	-	-	-	0

at Eccles Coliseum • Cedar City, UT

- Date: November 1

Statistics	APSU	SUU
First downs		
Total yards		
Rushing yards		
Passing yards		
Passing: Comp–Att–Int		
Time of possession		

Team	Category	Player	Statistics
Austin Peay	Passing		
Austin Peay	Rushing		
Austin Peay	Receiving		
Southern Utah	Passing		
Southern Utah	Rushing		
Southern Utah	Receiving		

=== Central Arkansas ===
Central Arkansas Bears (3-6) vs. Austin Peay Governors (5-4) – Game summary

Quarter	1	2	3	4	Total
Bears	-	-	-	-	0
Governors	-	-	-	-	0

at Fortera Stadium • Clarksville, TN

- Date: November 8

Statistics	CARK	APSU
First downs		
Total yards		
Rushing yards		
Passing yards		
Passing: Comp–Att–Int		
Time of possession		

Team	Category	Player	Statistics
Central Arkansas	Passing		
Central Arkansas	Rushing		
Central Arkansas	Receiving		
Austin Peay	Passing		
Austin Peay	Rushing		
Austin Peay	Receiving		

=== Samford ===
Samford Bulldogs (1–9) vs. Austin Peay Governors (6–4) – Game summary

Quarter	1	2	3	4	Total
Bulldogs	0	3	10	13	26
Governors	14	3	10	3	30

at Fortera Stadium • Clarksville, TN

- Date: November 15
- Game time: 1:00 p.m. CST
- Game attendance: 6,751
- TV announcers (ESPN+): Barry Gresham (play-by-play) and Ethan Schmidt (analyst)

Statistics	SAM	APSU
First downs		
Total yards		
Rushing yards		
Passing yards		
Passing: Comp–Att–Int		
Time of possession		

Team	Category	Player	Statistics
Samford	Passing		
Samford	Rushing		
Samford	Receiving		
Austin Peay	Passing		
Austin Peay	Rushing		
Austin Peay	Receiving		

=== at No. 5 Tarleton State ===
Austin Peay Governors (7-4) vs. No. 5 Tarleton State Texans (10-1) – Game summary

Quarter	1	2	3	4	Total
Governors	-	-	-	-	0
No. 5 Texans	-	-	-	-	0

at Memorial Stadium • Stephenville, TX

- Date: November 22

Statistics	APSU	TAR
First downs		
Total yards		
Rushing yards		
Passing yards		
Passing: Comp–Att–Int		
Time of possession		

Team	Category	Player	Statistics
Austin Peay	Passing		
Austin Peay	Rushing		
Austin Peay	Receiving		
Tarleton State	Passing		
Tarleton State	Rushing		
Tarleton State	Receiving		
