= 2025 NCAA Division I FCS football rankings =

Rankings for the 2025 NCAA Division I FCS football season

- Season: 2025
- Postseason: Single-elimination
- Preseason No. 1: North Dakota State
- National champions: Montana State
- Conference with most teams in final poll: Missouri Valley Football Conference

The 2025 National Collegiate Athletic Association (NCAA) Division I Football Championship Subdivision (FCS) football rankings consisted of two human polls, in addition to various publications' preseason polls. Unlike the Football Bowl Subdivision (FBS), college football's governing body, the NCAA, bestows the national championship title through a 24-team tournament. The following weekly polls determined the top teams at the NCAA Division I Football Championship Subdivision level of college football for the 2025 season. The STATS Poll was voted on by media members while the Coaches Poll was determined by coaches at the FCS level.

== Legend ==
Legend
	Increase in ranking
	Decrease in ranking
	Not ranked previous week
	Selected for NCAA FCS Playoffs
(Italics)	Number of first place votes
(#–#)	Win–loss record
т	Tied with team above or below also with this symbol

== STATS Poll ==
	Preseason August 4	Week 1 September 1	Week 2 September 8	Week 3 September 15	Week 4 September 22	Week 5 September 29	Week 6 October 6	Week 7 October 13	Week 8 October 20	Week 9 October 27	Week 10 November 3	Week 11 November 10	Week 12 November 17	Week 13 November 24	Final January 6, 2026	
1.	North Dakota State (54)	North Dakota State (1–0) (53)	North Dakota State (2–0) (49)	North Dakota State (3–0) (52)	North Dakota State (3–0) (51)	North Dakota State (4–0) (51)	North Dakota State (5–0) (54)	North Dakota State (6–0) (55)	North Dakota State (7–0) (55)	North Dakota State (8–0) (56)	North Dakota State (9–0) (56)	North Dakota State (10–0) (55)	North Dakota State (11–0) (56)	North Dakota State (12–0) (56)	Montana State (14–2) (56)	1.
2.	Montana State (1)	South Dakota State (1–0) (2)	South Dakota State (2–0) (7)	South Dakota State (3–0) (4)	South Dakota State (3–0) (4)	South Dakota State (4–0) (4)	South Dakota State (5–0) (1)	South Dakota State (6–0) (1)	South Dakota State (7–0) (1)	Tarleton State (9–0)	Montana (9–0)	Montana (10–0)	Montana (11–0)	Montana State (10–2)	Illinois State (12–5)	2.
3.	South Dakota State	Montana State (0–1) (1)	Tarleton State (3–0)	Tarleton State (4–0)	Tarleton State (5–0) (1)	Tarleton State (5–0) (1)	Tarleton State (6–0) (1)	Tarleton State (7–0)	Tarleton State (8–0)	Montana (8–0)	Montana State (7–2)	Montana State (8–2) (1)	Montana State (9–2)	Montana (11–1)	Montana (13–2)	3.
4.	South Dakota (1)	South Dakota (0–1)	Montana State (0–2)	Montana State (1–2)	Montana State (2–2)	Montana (4–0)	Montana (5–0)	Montana (6–0)	Montana (7–0)	Montana State (6–2) т	Lehigh (9–0)	Lehigh (10–0)	Lehigh (11–0)	Lehigh (12–0)	North Dakota State (12–1) т	4.
5.	Incarnate Word	Tarleton State (2–0)	Montana (1–0)	Montana (2–0)	Montana (3–0)	Montana State (3–2)	Montana State (4–2)	Montana State (5–2)	Montana State (5–2)	South Dakota State (7–1) т	Tennessee Tech (9–0)	Tennessee Tech (10–0)	Tarleton State (10–1)	Tarleton State (11–1)	Villanova (12–3) т	5.
6.	Illinois State	Montana (0–0)	Rhode Island (2–0)	Illinois State (2–1)	Rhode Island (4–0)	Illinois State (3–1)	UC Davis (4–1)	UC Davis (5–1)	UC Davis (5–1)	UC Davis (6–1)	Tarleton State (9–1)	Tarleton State (9–1)	Tennessee Tech (10–1)	Tennessee Tech (11–1)	Tarleton State (12–2)	6.
7.	Montana	Illinois State (0–1)	Illinois State (1–1)	Rhode Island (3–0)	Illinois State (3–1)	UC Davis (3–1)	Lehigh (6–0)	Lehigh (7–0)	Lehigh (7–0)	Lehigh (8–0)	Monmouth (8–1)	Harvard (8–0)	Mercer (9–1)	Mercer (9–2)	Stephen F. Austin (11–3)	7.
8.	UC Davis	UC Davis (1–0)	Idaho (1–1)	Idaho (2–1)	Idaho (2–2)	Rhode Island (4–1)	Southern Illinois (4–1)	Tennessee Tech (6–0)	North Dakota (5–2)	North Dakota (6–2)	South Dakota State (7–2)	Mercer (8–1)	Harvard (9–0)	Rhode Island (10–2)	UC Davis (9–4)	8.
9.	Rhode Island	Rhode Island (1–0)	UC Davis (1–1)	UC Davis (1–1)	UC Davis (2–1)	Lehigh (5–0)	Illinois State (3–2)	North Dakota (4–2)	Tennessee Tech (7–0)	Tennessee Tech (8–0)	Harvard (7–0)	UC Davis (6–3)	Villanova (8–2)	Villanova (9–2)	South Dakota (10–5)	9.
10.	Tarleton State	Idaho (0–1)	Lehigh (2–0)	Lehigh (3–0)	Lehigh (4–0)	Southern Illinois (3–1)	Tennessee Tech (5–0)	Illinois State (4–2)	Monmouth (6–1)	Monmouth (7–1)	Villanova (6–2)	Villanova (7–2)	Rhode Island (9–2)	Stephen F. Austin (10–2)	Lehigh (12–1)	10.
11.	Mercer	Lehigh (1–0)	Villanova (1–0)	Villanova (1–1)	Southern Illinois (3–1)	Tennessee Tech (4–0)	Idaho (2–3)	Monmouth (5–1)	Villanova (5–2)	Villanova (6–2)	UC Davis (6–2)	Rhode Island (8–2)	Illinois State (8–3)	UC Davis (8–3)	Rhode Island (11–3)	11.
12.	Idaho	Incarnate Word (1–1)	South Dakota (0–2)	Tennessee Tech (3–0)	Abilene Christian (2–2)	Idaho (2–3)	Monmouth (4–1)	Southern Illinois (4–2)	Jackson State (5–1)	Harvard (6–0)	Mercer (7–1)	Monmouth (8–2)	Monmouth (9–2)	South Dakota (8–4)	Abilene Christian (9–5)	12.
13.	Villanova	Villanova (0–0)	Abilene Christian (1–1)	Southern Illinois (2–1)	Tennessee Tech (3–0)	Northern Arizona (4–1)	North Dakota (3–2)	Abilene Christian (4–3)	Rhode Island (6–2)	Rhode Island (7–2)	North Dakota (6–3)	North Dakota (6–4)	North Dakota (7–4)	Abilene Christian (8–4)	South Dakota State (9–5)	13.
14.	Lehigh	Southern Illinois (1–0)	Incarnate Word (1–1)	Abilene Christian (1–2)	North Dakota (2–2)	Monmouth (3–1)	Northern Arizona (4–2)	Jackson State (5–1)	Harvard (5–0)	Lamar (7–1)	Rhode Island (7–2)	Illinois State (7–3)	Stephen F. Austin (9–2)	Youngstown State (8–4)	North Dakota (8–6)	14.
15.	Sacramento State	Jackson State (1–0)	Tennessee Tech (2–0)	South Dakota (1–2)	Northern Arizona (3–1)	North Dakota (2–2)	Jackson State (4–1)	Villanova (4–2)	Lamar (6–1)	Mercer (6–1)	Southern Illinois (6–3)	Stephen F. Austin (8–2)	UC Davis (7–3)	Harvard (9–1)	Yale (9–3)	15.
16.	Abilene Christian	Abilene Christian (0–1)	North Dakota (1–1)	North Dakota (1–2)	Monmouth (2–1)	West Georgia (5–0)	Austin Peay (4–2)	Rhode Island (5–2)	Southern Illinois (4–3)	Southern Illinois (5–3)	Illinois State (6–3)	South Dakota State (7–3)	South Dakota (8–4)	South Dakota State (8–4)	Tennessee Tech (11–2)	16.
17.	Jackson State	Tennessee Tech (1–0)	Southern Illinois (1–1)	Northern Arizona (2–1)	South Dakota (2–2)	Jackson State (3–1)	Rhode Island (4–2)	Lamar (5–1)	Mercer (5–1)	Illinois State (5–3)	Stephen F. Austin (7–2)	South Dakota (7–4)	Abilene Christian (7–4)	Illinois State (8–4) т	Mercer (9–3)	17.
18.	Western Carolina	Sacramento State (0–1)	Northern Arizona (1–1)	Austin Peay (2–1)	West Georgia (4–0)	Villanova (2–2)	Villanova (3–2)	Harvard (4–0)	Illinois State (4–3)	Youngstown State (5–3)	Abilene Christian (5–4)	Abilene Christian (6–4)	Youngstown State (7–4)	Southeastern Louisiana (9–3) т	Youngstown State (8–5)	18.
19.	Northern Arizona	Northern Arizona (0–1)	Jackson State (1–1)	Incarnate Word (1–2)	Jackson State (2–1)	Abilene Christian (2–3)	Abilene Christian (3–3)	Northern Arizona (4–3)	Presbyterian (7–0)	Northern Arizona (5–3)	Southeastern Louisiana (7–2)	Lamar (8–2)	Lamar (8–3)	North Dakota (7–5)	Southeastern Louisiana (9–4)	19.
20.	Southern Illinois	North Dakota (0–1)	Monmouth (2–0)	Jackson State (2–1)	Villanova (1–2)	Lamar (3–1)	Lamar (4–1)	Mercer (5–1)	Northern Arizona (4–3)	Stephen F. Austin (6–2)	Lamar (7–2)	Youngstown State (6–4)	Jackson State (8–2)	Jackson State (9–2)	Harvard (9–2)	20.
21.	Tennessee Tech	Monmouth (1–0)	Sacramento State (0–2)	Monmouth (2–1)	Sacramento State (2–2)	South Dakota (2–3)	West Georgia (5–1)	Presbyterian (6–0)	South Dakota (5–3)	Southeastern Louisiana (6–2)	Youngstown State (5–4)	Southern Illinois (6–4)	Southeastern Louisiana (8–3)	Monmouth (9–3)	South Carolina State (10–3)	21.
22.	Monmouth	Nicholls (1–1)	Austin Peay (1–1)	West Georgia (3–0)	Lamar (2–1)	Austin Peay (3–2)	Harvard (3–0)	South Dakota (4–3)	Youngstown State (4–3)	Austin Peay (5–3)	South Dakota (6–4)	Jackson State (7–2)	South Dakota State (7–4)	New Hampshire (8–4)	Monmouth (9–3)	22.
23.	Stephen F. Austin	Mercer (0–1)	New Hampshire (2–0)	Lamar (2–1)	Austin Peay (2–2)	Presbyterian (5–0)	South Dakota (3–3)	Austin Peay (4–3)	Abilene Christian (4–4)	Jackson State (5–2)	Jackson State (6–2)	Southeastern Louisiana (7–3)	Northern Arizona (7–4)	Southern Illinois (7–5)	New Hampshire (8–5)	23.
24.	Stony Brook	Southern Utah (1–0)	Lamar (1–1)	Sacramento State (1–2)	Youngstown State (3–1)	Youngstown State (3–1)	Presbyterian (5–0)	Idaho (2–4)	Stephen F. Austin (5–2)	Abilene Christian (4–4)	Western Carolina (6–3)	Northern Arizona (6–4)	Southern Illinois (6–5)	Yale (8–2)	Lamar (8–5)	24.
25.	Richmond	Stephen F. Austin (0–1)	West Georgia (2–0)	New Hampshire (2–1)	Presbyterian (4–0)	Harvard (2–0)	Mercer (4–1)	Stephen F. Austin (4–2)	Austin Peay (4–3)	Presbyterian (7–1)	Presbyterian (8–1)	Western Carolina (6–4)	New Hampshire (7–4)	Lamar (8–4)	Southern Illinois (7–5)	25.
	Preseason August 4	Week 1 September 1	Week 2 September 8	Week 3 September 15	Week 4 September 22	Week 5 September 29	Week 6 October 6	Week 7 October 13	Week 8 October 20	Week 9 October 27	Week 10 November 3	Week 11 November 10	Week 12 November 17	Week 13 November 24	Final January 6, 2026	
		Dropped: No. 18 Western Carolina; No. 24 Stony Brook; No. 25 Richmond	Dropped: No. 22 Nicholls; No. 23 Mercer; No. 24 Southern Utah; No. 25 Stephen F. Austin	None	Dropped: No. 19 Incarnate Word; No. 25 New Hampshire	Dropped: No. 21 Sacramento State	Dropped: No. 24 Youngstown State	Dropped: No. 21 West Georgia	Dropped: No. 24 Idaho	Dropped: No. 21 South Dakota	Dropped: No. 19 Northern Arizona; No. 22 Austin Peay	Dropped: No. 25 Presbyterian	Dropped: No. 25 Western Carolina	Dropped: No. 23 Northern Arizona	Dropped: No. 20 Jackson State	

== Coaches Poll ==
	Preseason August 11	Week 1 September 2	Week 2 September 8	Week 3 September 15	Week 4 September 22	Week 5 September 29	Week 6 October 6	Week 7 October 13	Week 8 October 20	Week 9 October 27	Week 10 November 3	Week 11 November 10	Week 12 November 17	Week 13 November 24	Final January 6, 2026	
1.	North Dakota State (26)	North Dakota State (1–0) (25)	North Dakota State (2–0) (24)	North Dakota State (3–0) (25)	North Dakota State (3–0) (25)	North Dakota State (4–0) (25)	North Dakota State (5–0) (26)	North Dakota State (6–0) (26)	North Dakota State (7–0) (25)	North Dakota State (8–0) (25)	North Dakota State (9–0) (25)	North Dakota State (10–0) (23)	North Dakota State (11–0) (23)	North Dakota State (12–0) (24)	Montana State (14–2) (21)	1.
2.	Montana State	South Dakota State (1–0)	South Dakota State (2–0) (2)	South Dakota State (3–0) (1)	South Dakota State (3–0) (1)	South Dakota State (4–0) (1)	South Dakota State (5–0)	South Dakota State (6–0)	South Dakota State (7–0)	Tarleton State (9–0)	Montana (9–0)	Montana (10–0) (1)	Montana (11–0) (1)	Montana State (10–2) (1)	Illinois State (12–5)	2.
3.	South Dakota State	Montana State (0–1) т	Tarleton State (3–0)	Tarleton State (4–0)	Tarleton State (5–0)	Tarleton State (5–0)	Tarleton State (6–0)	Tarleton State (7–0)	Tarleton State (8–0)	Montana (8–0)	Montana State (7–2)	Montana State (8–2)	Montana State (9–2)	Lehigh (12–0)	Montana (13–2)	3.
4.	Incarnate Word	Tarleton State (2–0) (1) т	Illinois State (1–1)	Illinois State (2–1)	Montana (3–0)	Montana (4–0)	Montana (5–0)	Montana (6–0)	Montana (7–0)	Montana State (6–2)	Lehigh (9–0)	Lehigh (10–0)	Lehigh (11–0)	Montana (11–1)	Villanova (12–3)	4.
5.	South Dakota	UC Davis (1–0)	Rhode Island (2–0)	Montana (2–0)	Illinois State (3–1)	Montana State (3–2)	Montana State (4–2)	Montana State (5–2)	Montana State (5–2)	South Dakota State (7–1)	Tennessee Tech (9–0)	Tarleton State (9–1)	Tarleton State (10–1)	Tarleton State (11–1)	North Dakota State (12–1)	5.
6.	Illinois State	South Dakota (0–1)	Montana State (0–2)	Montana State (1–2) т	Montana State (2–2)	Illinois State (3–1)	UC Davis (4–1)	UC Davis (5–1)	UC Davis (5–1)	UC Davis (6–1)	Monmouth (8–1)	Tennessee Tech (10–0)	Mercer (9–1)	Villanova (9–2)	Tarleton State (12–2)	6.
7.	UC Davis	Illinois State (0–1)	Montana (1–0)	Rhode Island (3–0) т	Rhode Island (4–0)	UC Davis (3–1)	Tennessee Tech (5–0)	Lehigh (7–0)	Lehigh (7–0)	Lehigh (8–0)	Tarleton State (9–1)	Villanova (7–2)	Villanova (8–2)	Tennessee Tech (11–1)	Stephen F. Austin (11–3)	7.
8.	Tarleton State	Rhode Island (1–0)	Incarnate Word (1–1)	Idaho (2–1)	UC Davis (2–1)	Lehigh (5–0)	Lehigh (6–0)	Tennessee Tech (6–0)	Tennessee Tech (7–0)	Tennessee Tech (8–0)	Villanova (6–2)	Mercer (8–1)	Tennessee Tech (10–1)	Mercer (9–2)	UC Davis (9–4)	8.
9.	Montana	Incarnate Word (1–1)	UC Davis (1–1)	UC Davis (1–1)	Lehigh (4–0)	Tennessee Tech (4–0)	Southern Illinois (4–1)	Illinois State (4–2)	Monmouth (6–1)	Monmouth (7–1)	South Dakota State (7–2)	Rhode Island (8–2)	Rhode Island (9–2)	Rhode Island (10–2)	Lehigh (12–1)	9.
10.	Rhode Island	Montana (0–0)	Idaho (1–1)	Lehigh (3–0)	Idaho (2–2)	Rhode Island (4–1)	Illinois State (3–2)	Monmouth (5–1)	North Dakota (5–2)	North Dakota (6–2)	Mercer (7–1) т	UC Davis (7–2)	Harvard (9–0)	Stephen F. Austin (10–2)	Rhode Island (11–3)	10.
11.	Mercer	Idaho (0–1)	Villanova (1–0)	Southern Illinois (2–1)	Tennessee Tech (3–0)	Southern Illinois (3–1)	Monmouth (4–1)	North Dakota (4–2)	Jackson State (5–1)	Villanova (6–2)	Rhode Island (7–2) т	Harvard (8–0)	Illinois State (8–3) т	UC Davis (8–3)	South Dakota (10–5)	11.
12.	Idaho	Villanova (0–0)	Lehigh (2–0)	Tennessee Tech (3–0) т	Southern Illinois (3–1)	Monmouth (3–1)	North Dakota (3–2)	Southern Illinois (4–2)	Villanova (5–2)	Rhode Island (7–2)	UC Davis (6–2)	Monmouth (8–2)	Monmouth (9–2) т	Jackson State (9–2)	Abilene Christian (9–5)	12.
13.	Villanova	Lehigh (1–0)	Abilene Christian (1–1)	Villanova (1–1) т	Abilene Christian (2–2)	Northern Arizona (4–1)	Idaho (2–3)	Jackson State (5–1)	Rhode Island (6–2)	Mercer (6–1)	Harvard (7–0)	Illinois State (7–3)	Stephen F. Austin (9–2)	Youngstown State (8–4)	Yale (9–3)	13.
14.	Sacramento State	Jackson State (1–0)	Southern Illinois (1–1)	Incarnate Word (1–2)	Monmouth (3–1)	North Dakota (2–2)	Jackson State (4–1)	Villanova (4–2)	Mercer (5–1)	Lamar (7–1)	Southeastern Louisiana (7–2)	Lamar (8–2)	UC Davis (7–3)	Abilene Christian (8–4)	South Dakota State (9–5)	14.
15.	Lehigh	Southern Illinois (1–0)	Jackson State (1–1)	Abilene Christian (1–2)	North Dakota (2–2) т	Idaho (2–3)	Austin Peay (4–2)	Rhode Island (5–2)	Lamar (6–1)	Harvard (6–0)	North Dakota (6–3)	South Dakota State (7–3)	Jackson State (8–2)	Southeastern Louisiana (9–3)	Tennessee Tech (11–2)	15.
16.	Abilene Christian	Sacramento State (0–1)	Tennessee Tech (2–0)	Jackson State (2–1)	Northern Arizona (3–1) т	West Georgia (5–0)	Northern Arizona (4–2)	Mercer (5–1)	Presbyterian (7–0)	Southeastern Louisiana (6–2)	Southern Illinois (6–3)	Jackson State (7–2)	North Dakota (7–4)	Monmouth (9–3)	North Dakota (8–6)	16.
17.	Jackson State	Abilene Christian (0–1)	North Dakota (1–1)	North Dakota (1–2)	Jackson State (2–1)	Jackson State (3–1)	Villanova (3–2)	Abilene Christian (4–3)	Harvard (5–0)	Southern Illinois (5–3)	Illinois State (6–3)	Stephen F. Austin (8–2)	Youngstown State (7–4)	Illinois State (8–4)	Youngstown State (8–5)	17.
18.	Northern Arizona	Monmouth (1–0)	Monmouth (2–0)	Monmouth (2–1)	South Dakota (2–2)	Youngstown State (3–1)	Rhode Island (4–2)	Lamar (5–1)	Southern Illinois (4–3)	Illinois State (5–3)	Lamar (7–2)	North Dakota (6–4)	Abilene Christian (7–4)	South Dakota State (8–4)	Mercer (9–3)	18.
19.	Western Carolina	Northern Arizona (0–1)	Northern Arizona (1–1)	Northern Arizona (2–1)	Youngstown State (3–1)	Villanova (2–2)	Mercer (4–1)	Presbyterian (6–0)	Southeastern Louisiana (5–2)	Youngstown State (5–3)	Jackson State (6–2)	Youngstown State (6–4)	Lamar (8–3)	Harvard (9–1)	Southeastern Louisiana (9–4)	19.
20.	Southern Illinois	Tennessee Tech (1–0)	South Dakota (0–2)	Austin Peay (2–1)	West Georgia (4–0)	Incarnate Word (2–3)	Youngstown State (3–2)	Harvard (4–0)	Illinois State (4–3)	Jackson State (5–2)	Abilene Christian (5–4)	Abilene Christian (6–4)	Southeastern Louisiana (8–3)	South Dakota (8–4)	Monmouth (9–3)	20.
21.	Monmouth	Mercer (0–1)	Sacramento State (0–2)	South Dakota (1–2)	Sacramento State (2–2)	Austin Peay (3–2)	Abilene Christian (3–3) т	Northern Arizona (4–3)	Youngstown State (4–3)	Northern Arizona (5–3)	Stephen F. Austin (7–2)	Southeastern Louisiana (7–3)	South Dakota (8–4)	Yale (8–2)	Lamar (8–5)	21.
22.	Richmond т	North Dakota (0–1)	Mercer (0–1)	Sacramento State (1–2)	Villanova (1–2)	Mercer (3–1)	West Georgia (5–1) т	Southeastern Louisiana (4–2)	Northern Arizona (4–3)	Presbyterian (7–1)	Youngstown State (5–4)	South Dakota (7–4)	South Dakota State (7–4)	West Georgia (8–3)	Jackson State (9–3)	22.
23.	Tennessee Tech т	Stephen F. Austin (0–1)	Austin Peay (1–1)	New Hampshire (2–1)	Mercer (2–1)	Abilene Christian (2–3)	Presbyterian (5–0)	West Georgia (5–2)	Austin Peay (4–3)	Stephen F. Austin (6–2)	Presbyterian (8–1)	Southern Illinois (6–4)	West Georgia (8–3)	North Dakota (7–5)	Harvard (9–2)	23.
24.	Stephen F. Austin	East Tennessee State (1–0)	New Hampshire (2–0)	Youngstown State (2–1)	Incarnate Word (1–3)	Presbyterian (5–0)	Lamar (4–1)	Austin Peay (4–3)	Stephen F. Austin (5–2)	Austin Peay (5–3)	Western Carolina (6–3)	West Georgia (7–3)	Lafayette (8–3)	Lamar (8–4)	West Georgia (8–3)	24.
25.	Stony Brook	Nicholls (1–1) т; Western Carolina (0–1) т	Youngstown State (2–0)	Mercer (1–1)	Austin Peay (2–2)	Lamar (3–1)	Harvard (3–0)	Youngstown State (3–3)	Abilene Christian (4–4)	Abilene Christian (4–4)	South Dakota (6–4)	Lafayette (7–3)	Yale (7–2)	Southern Illinois (7–5)	South Carolina State (10–3)	25.
	Preseason August 11	Week 1 September 2	Week 2 September 8	Week 3 September 15	Week 4 September 22	Week 5 September 29	Week 6 October 6	Week 7 October 13	Week 8 October 20	Week 9 October 27	Week 10 November 3	Week 11 November 10	Week 12 November 17	Week 13 November 24	Final January 6, 2026	
		Dropped: No. 22т Richmond; No. 25 Stony Brook	Dropped: No. 23 Stephen F. Austin; No. 24 East Tennessee State; No. 25т Nicholls; No. 25т Western Carolina	None	Dropped: No. 23 New Hampshire	Dropped: No. 18 South Dakota; No. 21 Sacramento State	Dropped: No. 20 Incarnate Word	Dropped: No. 13 Idaho	Dropped: No. 25 West Georgia	None	Dropped: No. 21 Northern Arizona; No. 24 Austin Peay	Dropped: No. 23 Presbyterian; No. 24 Western Carolina	Dropped: No. 23 Southern Illinois	Dropped: No. 24 Lafayette	Dropped: No. 25 Southern Illinois	
