= 2025 NCAA Division I FCS football season =

American college football season

2025 NCAA Division I FCS season

Regular season
- Number of teams: 129
- Duration: August 23 – December 6
- Payton Award: Youngstown State quarterback Beau Brungard
- Buchanan Award: Mercer defensive end Andrew Zock

Playoff
- Duration: November 29 – January 5
- Championship date: January 5, 2026
- Championship site: FirstBank Stadium, Nashville, Tennessee
- Champion: Montana State

NCAA Division I FCS football seasons
- «2024 2026»

The 2025 NCAA Division I FCS football season, part of college football in the United States, was organized by the National Collegiate Athletic Association (NCAA) at the Division I Football Championship Subdivision (FCS) level. The regular season began on August 23 and ended in November, with the exception of the SWAC Football Championship Game in early December. The postseason began on November 29 and ended on January 5, 2026, with the 2026 NCAA Division I Football Championship Game at FirstBank Stadium in Nashville, Tennessee.

Due to the structure of the calendar in 2025, FCS teams were allowed to play 12 regular-season games instead of the usual 11. This was the last season before the permanent expansion to a 12-game regular season (see "Notable headlines" below).

== Conference changes and new programs ==
Two schools played their first FCS seasons in 2025—one transitioning from NCAA Division II, and the other playing its first season of varsity football. One other school changed conferences within FCS after the 2024 season. Two others left FCS for the Football Bowl Subdivision.

School	2024 conference	2025 conference	Ref
Delaware	CAA Football	CUSA (FBS)	
Missouri State	MVFC	CUSA (FBS)	
New Haven	NE-10 (D-II)	NEC	
Richmond	CAA Football	Patriot	
UTRGV	New program	Southland	

== Notable headlines ==
- December 12, 2024 – The Ivy League announced that starting with the 2025 football season; the Ivy League champion would compete in the FCS playoffs. This marked the first time that conference participated in postseason play since the 1945 signing of the Ivy Group Agreement, which initially governed football competition between Ivy schools but was extended to cover all sports in 1954. (Note: The Ivy League officially dates its existence from the 1954 extension of the Ivy Group Agreement.)
- March 25, 2025 – Saint Francis announced that it would reclassify to NCAA Division III starting in 2026–27, when it will leave the Northeast Conference for the Presidents' Athletic Conference.
- April 25 – William & Mary announced that its football program would leave CAA Football for associate membership in the Patriot League starting in the 2026 season. W&M's non-football sports will remain in the multi-sports CAA, which is a separate entity from CAA Football.
- May 5 – The Missouri Valley Football Conference (MVFC) announced a new governance structure that formalized the decades-long informal ties between it and the Missouri Valley Conference (MVC), and created a formal relationship between the MVFC and the non-football Summit League. MVC commissioner Jeff Jackson replaced founding MVFC commissioner Patty Viverito following her June 30 retirement, and Summit commissioner Josh Fenton filled the new position of executive advisor at that time. Administrative operations are shared by the MVC and Summit, which were home to all but one of the MVFC's 10 members in the 2025 season.
- May 6 – New Haven announced that it accepted an invite to join the Northeast Conference effective July 1, 2025, and begin reclassification from NCAA Division II to be eligible for postseason play in 2028–29.
- June 5 – Villanova announced it would leave CAA Football after the 2025 season for the Patriot League, while otherwise remaining a member of the non-football Big East Conference.
- June 23 – The NCAA Division I Board of Directors announced that St. Thomas had met all the requirements to be fully instated as a Division I university starting with the 2025–26 academic year. The Tommies will now be eligible for all NCAA postseason tournaments, including the FCS playoffs.
- June 25 – The Big Sky Conference announced that Southern Utah and Utah Tech, Western Athletic Conference (WAC) members that play football in the United Athletic Conference (UAC), would join the Big Sky in 2026.
- June 26:
  - The Division I Council approved the following measures, to take effect with the 2026 season, which the NCAA's FCS Oversight Committee had recommended on May 6:
    - Permanent expansion of the FCS regular season from 11 to 12 games.
    - Standardization of the regular season starting date as the Thursday 13 weeks before the FCS playoff bracket is released on the Saturday before Thanksgiving. (The normal start of the FCS regular season had been the Thursday preceding Labor Day.)
    - Elimination of rule exceptions allowing contests that meet legislated criteria to be played as early as the second Saturday before Labor Day. Instead, all FCS teams will be able to play during what the Football Bowl Subdivision calls Week 0.
  - The Atlantic Sun Conference (ASUN) and WAC announced that their football alliance, the UAC, would become an all-sports conference in 2026. At that time, the WAC will rebrand as the UAC, with its membership including all seven remaining UAC members with scholarship FCS programs plus non-football UT Arlington (the conference would later add another non-football school, Little Rock). The ASUN membership going forward will consist of five non-football schools, Pioneer Football League member Stetson, and Bellarmine, which plays the non-NCAA variant of sprint football.
- July 22 — CAA Football announced that Sacred Heart would join the conference in 2026, ending the Pioneers' two-year stint as an FCS independent. Sacred Heart will remain a member of the non-football Metro Atlantic Athletic Conference.
- August 13 – The Southern Conference announced that Tennessee Tech would join from the Ohio Valley Conference and the OVC–Big South Football Association in 2026.
- October 2 – The Northeast Conference adopted its longstanding abbreviation of NEC as its official name.
- October 8:
  - The Division I Administrative Committee, which officially renamed itself the Division I Cabinet at its scheduled meeting, introduced a proposal to expand allowed logos on student-athletes' uniforms and equipment beyond those of the manufacturer. It also approved changes to the football transfer portal previously recommended by the FBS and FCS Oversight Committees:
    - A single transfer window will run from January 2–16. This only affects entry into the portal; a player who enters the portal may transfer outside the window.
    - The window for players undergoing a head coaching change was modified. The window for these players will open five calendar days after the hiring or public announcement of a new head coach, and run for 15 days. Should a school not hire or announce a new head coach after 30 days from the previous coach's departure, a separate 15-day window will open on the 31st day, provided that the 31st day is on or after January 3. The opportunity for such a window will exist through June 30.
- October 18 – Shortly before its homecoming game against Marist, Morehead State officially renamed its home of Jayne Stadium to Phil Simms Stadium.
- December 18 – Chicago State announced that it would play its first season of FCS football in 2026, initially as an independent before joining NEC football in 2027.

== Kickoff games ==
The regular season began on Saturday, August 23 in Week 0:

Date	Visiting team	Home team	Site	Result	Attendance	Ref.
August 23	No. 8 ~~UC Davis~~	No. 11 ~~Mercer~~	Cramton Bowl • Montgomery, Alabama (FCS Kickoff)	No contest (Note: The game was declared a no contest after long weather delay. UC Davis were leading 23–17 with 7:46 remaining in the fourth quarter.)		
August 23	North Carolina Central	Southern	Center Parc Stadium • Atlanta, Georgia (MEAC/SWAC Challenge)	31–14	16,191	
August 23	No. 5 Incarnate Word	Nicholls	Manning Field at John L. Guidry Stadium • Thibodaux, Louisiana	6–20	8,779	
August 23	No. 10 Tarleton State	Portland State	Hillsboro Stadium • Portland, Oregon	42–0	1,890	
August 23	Idaho State	UNLV	Allegiant Stadium • Paradise, Nevada	31–38	25,723	
^{#}Rankings from STATS poll released prior to the game.

== Regular season top 10 matchups ==
Date	Visiting team	Home team	Site	Result	Attendance	Ref.
September 6	No. 2 South Dakota State	No. 3 Montana State	Bobcat Stadium • Bozeman, Montana	30–24 ^{2OT}	22,117	
September 27	No. 8 Idaho	No. 5 Montana	Washington–Grizzly Stadium • Missoula, Montana (Little Brown Stein)	30–41	27,025	
October 4	No. 1 North Dakota State	No. 6 Illinois State	Hancock Stadium • Normal, Illinois	33–16	9,829	
October 11	No. 8 Southern Illinois	No. 1 North Dakota State	Fargodome • Fargo, North Dakota	17–45	15,812	
October 25	No. 1 North Dakota State	No. 2 South Dakota State	Dana J. Dykhouse Stadium • Brookings, South Dakota (Dakota Marker)	38–7	19,477	
November 15	No. 9 UC Davis	No. 3 Montana State	Bobcat Stadium • Bozeman, Montana	17–38	21,777	
November 22	No. 3 Montana State	No. 2 Montana	Washington–Grizzly Stadium • Missoula, Montana (Brawl of the Wild)	31–28	27,340	
^{#}Rankings from STATS poll released prior to the game.

== Upsets ==
This section lists unranked teams defeating STATS poll-ranked teams during the season.

=== Regular season ===
Date	Visiting team	Home team	Site	Result	Attendance	Ref.
August 23	No. 5 Incarnate Word	Nicholls	Manning Field at John L. Guidry Stadium • Thibodaux, Louisiana	6–20	8,779	
August 30	Presbyterian	No. 11 Mercer	Five Star Stadium • Macon, Georgia	15–10	8,149	
August 30	Gardner–Webb	No. 18 Western Carolina	E. J. Whitmire Stadium • Cullowhee, North Carolina	52–45	11,889	
September 6	No. 4 South Dakota	Lamar	Provost Umphrey Stadium • Beaumont, Texas	13–20	6,043	
September 6	West Georgia	No. 22 Nicholls	Manning Field at John L. Guidry Stadium • Thibodaux, Louisiana	34–10	5,456	
September 6	No. 24 Southern Utah	San Diego	Torero Stadium • San Diego, California	27–30	2,564	
September 20	No. 25 New Hampshire	Dartmouth	Memorial Field • Hanover, New Hampshire (Granite Bowl)	20–27	4,457	
September 27	Cal Poly	No. 21 Sacramento State	Hornet Stadium • Sacramento, California	32–24	15,016	
September 27	No. 12 Abilene Christian	Incarnate Word	Gayle and Tom Benson Stadium • San Antonio, Texas	7–38	3,006	
October 3	No. 8 Rhode Island	Brown	Centreville Bank Stadium • Pawtucket, Rhode Island (Governor's Cup)	21–28	5,047	
October 11	Northern Colorado	No. 11 Idaho	Kibbie Dome • Moscow, Idaho	49–33	12,902	
October 11	No. 16 Austin Peay	Eastern Kentucky	Roy Kidd Stadium • Richmond, Kentucky	20–34	5,753	
October 18	Youngstown State	No. 10 Illinois State	Hancock Stadium • Normal, Illinois	40–35	9,834	
October 18	No. 13 Abilene Christian	Southern Utah	Eccles Coliseum • Cedar City, Utah	24–31	2,030	
October 18	No. 24 Idaho	Eastern Washington	Roos Field • Cheney, Washington (rivalry)	14–21	6,071	
October 25	Grambling State	No. 12 Jackson State	Allegiant Stadium • Las Vegas, Nevada (Las Vegas HBCU Classic)	26–24	29,655	
October 25	No. 19 Presbyterian	Dayton	Welcome Stadium • Dayton, Ohio	19–35	2,687	
October 31	Idaho	No. 19 Northern Arizona	Walkup Skydome • Flagstaff, Arizona	35–32 ^{OT}	8,010	
November 1	Indiana State	No. 4т South Dakota State	Dana J. Dykhouse Stadium • Brookings, South Dakota	24–12	15,842	
November 1	Idaho State	No. 6 UC Davis	UC Davis Health Stadium • Davis, California	38–36	10,973	
November 1	No. 8 North Dakota	South Dakota	DakotaDome • Vermillion, South Dakota (Sitting Bull Trophy)	21–26	6,809	
November 1	No. 14 Lamar	Incarnate Word	Gayle and Tom Benson Stadium • San Antonio, Texas	17–24	2,680	
November 1	No. 22 Austin Peay	Southern Utah	Eccles Coliseum • Cedar City, Utah	17–33	2,808	
November 8	New Hampshire	No. 7 Monmouth	Kessler Stadium • West Long Branch, New Jersey	34–13	3,127	
November 8	No. 25 Presbyterian	Davidson	Davidson College Stadium • Davidson, North Carolina (1919 Cup)	13–14	2,373	
November 15	East Tennessee State	No. 25 Western Carolina	E. J. Whitmire Stadium • Cullowhee, North Carolina (Blue Ridge Border Battle)	52–35	10,543	
November 22	Albany	No. 12 Monmouth	Kessler Stadium • West Long Branch, New Jersey	31–24	2,813	
November 22	No. 23 Northern Arizona	Weber State	Stewart Stadium • Ogden, Utah (Red Rock Trophy)	28–48	3,149	
^{#}Rankings from STATS poll released prior to the game.

=== Postseason upsets ===
This section lists unseeded teams defeating seeded teams during the playoffs. Seed rankings appears in parentheses.

Date	Visiting team	Home team	Site	Result	Attendance	Ref.
November 29	No. T–17 Illinois State	No. T–17 (16) Southeastern Louisiana	Strawberry Stadium • Hammond, Louisiana (First round)	21–3	3,321	
November 29	No. 19 North Dakota	No. 6 (13) Tennessee Tech	Tucker Stadium • Cookeville, Tennessee (First round)	31–6	4,641	
November 29	No. 24 Yale	No. 14 (15) Youngstown State	Stambaugh Stadium • Youngstown, Ohio (First round)	43–42	4,869	
December 6	No. T–17 Illinois State	No. 1 (1) North Dakota State	Fargodome • Fargo, North Dakota (Second round)	29–28	10,464	
December 13	No. T–17 Illinois State	No. 11 (8) UC Davis	UC Davis Health Stadium • Davis, California (Quarterfinal)	42–31	9,216	
December 20	No. T–17 Illinois State	No. 9 (12) Villanova	Villanova Stadium • Villanova, Pennsylvania (Semifinal)	30–14	4,133	
^{#}Rankings from STATS poll released on November 24.

== FCS team wins over FBS teams ==
Italics denotes FBS teams.

Date	Visiting team	Home team	Site	Result	Attendance	Ref.
August 29	No. 10 Tarleton State	Army	Michie Stadium • West Point, New York	30–27 ^{2OT}	23,032	
August 30	Austin Peay	Middle Tennessee	Johnny "Red" Floyd Stadium • Murfreesboro, Tennessee	34–14	18,505	
September 6	Bryant	UMass	Warren McGuirk Alumni Stadium • Amherst, Massachusetts	27–26	3,714	
September 6	LIU	Eastern Michigan	Rynearson Stadium • Ypsilanti, Michigan	28–23	15,313	
^{#}Rankings from STATS poll released prior to the game.

=== Non-DI team wins over FCS teams ===
Italics denotes non-DI teams.

Date	Visiting team	Home team	Site	Result	Attendance	Ref.
August 30	Webber International ^{(NAIA)}	Stetson	Spec Martin Stadium • DeLand, Florida	31–21	1,975	
September 6	Adrian ^{(D-III)}	Valparaiso	Brown Field • Valparaiso, Indiana	10–7	1,941	
^{#}Rankings from AP Poll released prior to game.

== Conference standings ==
2025 Big Sky Conference football standings
	Conf.			Overall
Team	W		L	W		L
No. 1 Montana State $^	8	–	0	14	–	2
No. 3 Montana ^	7	–	1	13	–	2
No. 8 UC Davis ^	6	–	2	9	–	4
Sacramento State	5	–	3	7	–	5
Idaho State	5	–	3	6	–	6
Northern Arizona	4	–	4	7	–	5
Eastern Washington	4	–	4	5	–	7
Cal Poly	2	–	6	4	–	8
Idaho	2	–	6	4	–	8
Northern Colorado	2	–	6	4	–	8
Weber State	2	–	6	4	–	8
Portland State	1	–	7	1	–	11
$ – Conference champion; ^ – FCS playoff participant; Rankings from STATS Poll

2025 Coastal Athletic Association Football Conference standings
	Conf.			Overall
Team	W		L	W		L
No. 11 Rhode Island $^	8	–	0	11	–	3
No. 4т Villanova ^	7	–	1	12	–	3
No. 23 New Hampshire ^	6	–	2	8	–	5
No. 22 Monmouth	6	–	2	9	–	3
William & Mary	6	–	2	7	–	5
Maine	5	–	3	6	–	6
Elon	4	–	4	6	–	6
Stony Brook	4	–	4	6	–	6
Towson	4	–	4	6	–	6
North Carolina A&T	2	–	6	2	–	10
Campbell	2	–	6	2	–	10
Bryant	1	–	7	3	–	9
Albany	1	–	7	2	–	10
Hampton	0	–	8	2	–	10
$ – Conference champion; ^ – FCS playoff participant; Rankings from STATS Poll

2025 Ivy League football standings
	Conf.			Overall
Team	W		L	W		L
No. 15 Yale +^	6	–	1	9	–	3
No. 20 Harvard +^	6	–	1	9	–	2
Dartmouth	4	–	3	7	–	3
Penn	4	–	3	6	–	4
Cornell	3	–	4	4	–	6
Princeton	2	–	5	3	–	7
Brown	2	–	5	5	–	5
Columbia	1	–	6	2	–	8
+ – Conference co-champions; ^ – FCS playoff participant; Rankings from STATS Poll

2025 Mid-Eastern Athletic Conference football standings
	Conf.			Overall
Team	W		L	W		L
No. 21 South Carolina State $	5	–	0	10	–	3
Delaware State	4	–	1	8	–	4
North Carolina Central	3	–	2	8	–	4
Howard	2	–	3	5	–	7
Morgan State	1	–	4	4	–	8
Norfolk State	0	–	5	1	–	11
$ – Conference champion; Rankings from STATS Poll

2025 Missouri Valley Football Conference standings
	Conf.			Overall
Team	W		L	W		L
No. 4т North Dakota State $^	8	–	0	12	–	1
No. 9 South Dakota ^	6	–	2	10	–	5
No. 2 Illinois State ^	5	–	3	12	–	5
No. 14 North Dakota ^	5	–	3	8	–	6
No. 18 Youngstown State ^	5	–	3	8	–	5
No. 13 South Dakota State ^	4	–	4	9	–	5
No. 25 Southern Illinois	4	–	4	7	–	5
Northern Iowa	1	–	7	3	–	9
Murray State	1	–	7	1	–	11
Indiana State	1	–	7	3	–	9
$ – Conference champion; ^ – FCS playoff participant; Rankings from STATS Poll

2025 Northeast Conference football standings
	Conf.			Overall
Team	W		L	W		L
Central Connecticut $^	6	–	1	8	–	5
Duquesne	5	–	2	7	–	5
Mercyhurst*	4	–	3	5	–	7
LIU	4	–	3	6	–	6
Wagner	4	–	3	5	–	7
Stonehill	3	–	4	4	–	8
Robert Morris	2	–	5	3	–	9
New Haven*	0	–	0	5	–	5
Saint Francis	0	–	7	0	–	11
$ – Conference champion; ^ – FCS playoff participant; * – Ineligible for NEC title and FCS postseason play due to transition from NCAA Division II.; Rankings from STATS Poll

2025 OVC–Big South football standings
	Conf.			Overall
Team	W		L	W		L
No. 16 Tennessee Tech $^	8	–	0	11	–	2
UT Martin	6	–	2	6	–	6
Gardner–Webb	5	–	3	7	–	5
Lindenwood	5	–	3	6	–	6
Charleston Southern	4	–	4	5	–	7
Southeast Missouri State	3	–	5	4	–	8
Western Illinois	3	–	5	4	–	8
Eastern Illinois	2	–	6	3	–	8
Tennessee State	0	–	8	2	–	10
$ – Conference champion; ^ – FCS playoff participant; Rankings from STATS Poll

2025 Patriot League football standings
	Conf.			Overall
Team	W		L	W		L
No. 10 Lehigh $^	7	–	0	12	–	1
Lafayette	6	–	1	8	–	4
Holy Cross	3	–	4	3	–	9
Richmond	3	–	4	7	–	5
Georgetown	3	–	4	6	–	6
Colgate	3	–	4	5	–	7
Bucknell	2	–	5	5	–	7
Fordham	1	–	6	1	–	11
$ – Conference champion; ^ – FCS playoff participant; Rankings from STATS Poll

2025 Pioneer Football League standings
	Conf.			Overall
Team	W		L	W		L
Drake $^	7	–	1	8	–	4
Presbyterian	6	–	2	10	–	2
San Diego	6	–	2	8	–	4
St. Thomas	5	–	3	7	–	5
Dayton	5	–	3	7	–	4
Morehead State	4	–	4	6	–	6
Butler	4	–	4	6	–	6
Marist	3	–	5	5	–	7
Stetson	2	–	6	3	–	9
Davidson	1	–	7	2	–	10
Valparaiso	1	–	7	2	–	10
$ – Conference champion; ^ – FCS playoff participant; Rankings from STATS Poll

2025 Southern Conference football standings
	Conf.			Overall
Team	W		L	W		L
No. 17 Mercer $^	8	–	0	9	–	3
Western Carolina	6	–	2	7	–	5
East Tennessee State	5	–	3	7	–	5
Wofford	5	–	3	6	–	6
Chattanooga	4	–	4	5	–	7
Furman	4	–	4	6	–	6
The Citadel	3	–	5	4	–	8
Samford	1	–	7	1	–	11
VMI	0	–	8	1	–	11
$ – Conference champion; ^ – FCS playoff participant; Rankings from STATS Poll

2025 Southland Conference football standings
	Conf.			Overall
Team	W		L	W		L
No. 7 Stephen F. Austin $^	8	–	0	11	–	3
No. 19 Southeastern Louisiana ^	7	–	1	9	–	4
No. 24 Lamar ^	5	–	3	8	–	5
UT Rio Grande Valley	5	–	3	9	–	3
Nicholls	4	–	4	4	–	8
McNeese	4	–	4	5	–	7
East Texas A&M	3	–	5	3	–	9
Incarnate Word	3	–	5	5	–	7
Houston Christian	1	–	7	2	–	10
Northwestern State	0	–	8	1	–	11
$ – Conference champion; ^ – FCS playoff participant; Rankings from STATS Poll

2025 Southwestern Athletic Conference football standings
	Conf.			Overall
Team	W		L	W		L
East Division
Jackson State xy	7	–	1	9	–	3
Alabama State x	7	–	1	10	–	2
Bethune–Cookman	5	–	3	6	–	6
Florida A&M	4	–	4	5	–	7
Alabama A&M	1	–	7	4	–	8
Mississippi Valley State*	1	–	7	2	–	10
West Division
Prairie View A&M xy$	7	–	1	10	–	4
Texas Southern	5	–	3	6	–	5
Alcorn State	4	–	4	5	–	7
Grambling State	4	–	4	7	–	5
Arkansas–Pine Bluff*	2	–	6	4	–	8
Southern	1	–	7	2	–	10
Championship: Prairie View A&M 23, Jackson State 21
$ – Conference champion; x – Division champion/co-champions; y – Championship game participant; * – Ineligible for FCS postseason play due to failed academic requirements; Rankings from STATS Poll

2025 United Athletic Conference standings
	Conf.			Overall
Team	W		L	W		L
No. 12 Abilene Christian +^	7	–	1	9	–	5
No. 6 Tarleton State +^	7	–	1	12	–	2
Southern Utah	6	–	2	7	–	5
West Georgia*	5	–	3	8	–	3
Austin Peay	4	–	4	7	–	5
Eastern Kentucky	3	–	5	5	–	7
Central Arkansas	2	–	6	3	–	9
Utah Tech	1	–	7	2	–	10
North Alabama	1	–	7	2	–	10
+ – Conference co-champions; ^ – FCS playoff participant; * – Ineligible for the UAC title and FCS postseason play due to transition from NCAA Division II.; Rankings from STATS Poll

2025 NCAA Division I FCS independents football standings
	Conf.			Overall
Team	W		L	W		L
Sacred Heart		–		8	–	4
Merrimack		–		4	–	8

== Playoff qualifiers ==
=== Automatic berths for conference champions ===
Locations of the 11 playoff automatic berths participants

Conference	Team	Record	Appearance	Last bid	Result of last appearance
Big Sky Conference	Montana State	10–2	15th	2024	Lost to North Dakota State in National Championship
CAA Football	Rhode Island	10–2	5th	2024	Lost to Mercer in the second round
Ivy League	Yale	8–2	1st (Note: This was the first year that the Ivy League participated in the playoff.)	–	–
Missouri Valley Football Conference	North Dakota State	12–0	16th	2024	Won National Championship against Montana State
Northeast Conference	Central Connecticut	8–4	4th	2024	Lost to Rhode Island in the first round
OVC–Big South	Tennessee Tech	11–1	2nd	2011	Lost to Central Arkansas in the first round
Patriot League	Lehigh	12–0	13th	2024	Lost to Idaho in the second round
Pioneer Football League	Drake	8–3	3rd	2024	Lost to Tarleton State in the first round
Southern Conference	Mercer	9–2	3rd	2024	Lost to North Dakota State in quarterfinal
Southland Conference	Stephen F. Austin	10–2	9th	2021	Lost to Incarnate Word in first round
United Athletic Conference	Abilene Christian	8–4	2nd	2024	Lost to North Dakota State in second round

=== At-large qualifiers ===
Locations of the 13 playoff at-large qualifiers participants

Conference	Team	Record	Appearance	Last bid	Result of last appearance
Big Sky Conference	UC Davis	8–3	4th	2024	Lost to South Dakota in the quarterfinals
Big Sky Conference	Montana	11–1	30th	2024	Lost to South Dakota State in second round
CAA Football	New Hampshire	8–4	19th	2024	Lost to UT Martin in first round
CAA Football	Villanova	9–2	17th	2024	Lost to Incarnate Word in second round
Ivy League	Harvard	9–1	1st	–	–
Missouri Valley Football Conference	Illinois State	8–4	10th	2024	Lost to UC Davis in second round
Missouri Valley Football Conference	North Dakota	7–5	6th	2023	Lost to Sacramento State in first round
Missouri Valley Football Conference	South Dakota	8–4	5th	2024	Lost to Montana State in semifinals
Missouri Valley Football Conference	South Dakota State	8–4	15th	2024	Lost to North Dakota State in semifinals
Missouri Valley Football Conference	Youngstown State	8–4	14th	2023	Lost to Villanova in second round
Southland Conference	Lamar	8–4	2nd	2018	Lost to Northern Iowa in first round
Southland Conference	Southeastern Louisiana	9–3	6th	2022	Lost to Samford in second round
United Athletic Conference	Tarleton State	11–1	2nd	2024	Lost to South Dakota in second round

=== Abstentions ===
- Mid-Eastern Athletic Conference – South Carolina State
- Southwestern Athletic Conference – Prairie View A&M and Jackson State

== Postseason ==
=== NCAA Division I playoff bracket ===
First Round; November 29; Campus sites USA: ESPN+ Canada: TSN+
16	Southeastern Louisiana	3
Illinois State	21
9	Rhode Island	27
Central Connecticut	19
13	Tennessee Tech	6
North Dakota	31
12	Villanova	52
Harvard	7
15	Youngstown State	42
Yale	43
10	Abilene Christian	38
Lamar	20
14	South Dakota State	41
New Hampshire	3
11	South Dakota	38
Drake	17

Second Round; December 6 Campus sites USA: ESPN2/ESPN+ Canada: TSN+
1	North Dakota State	28
Illinois State	29
8	UC Davis	47
9	Rhode Island	26
4	Tarleton State	31
North Dakota	13
5	Lehigh	7
12	Villanova	14
2	Montana State	21
Yale	13
7	Stephen F. Austin	41
10	Abilene Christian	34
3	Montana	50
14	South Dakota State	29
6	Mercer	0
11	South Dakota	47

Quarterfinals; December 12/13; Campus sites USA: ABC/ESPN/ESPN+ Canada: TSN+
Illinois State	42
8	UC Davis	31
4	Tarleton State	21
12	Villanova	26
2	Montana State	44
7	Stephen F. Austin	28
3	Montana	52
11	South Dakota	22

Semifinals; December 20; Campus sites USA: ABC/ESPN2; Canada: TSN+
Illinois State	30
12	Villanova	14
2	Montana State	48
3	Montana	23

National Championship; January 5; 7:30 p.m. EST; FirstBank Stadium, Nashville, Tennessee; USA: ESPN; Canada: TSN2/TSN+
Illinois State	34
2	Montana State	35*

== Rankings ==
The top 25 from both the AFCA Coaches and STATS Perform polls.

=== Preseason polls ===
AFCA Coaches
Rk	Team	Pts
1	North Dakota State (26)	650
2	Montana State	612
3	South Dakota State	581
4	Incarnate Word	541
5	South Dakota	521
6	Illinois State	466
7	UC Davis	456
8	Tarleton State	454
9	Montana	447
10	Rhode Island	416
11	Mercer	396
12	Idaho	371
13	Villanova	338
14	Sacramento State	265
15	Lehigh	207
16	Abilene Christian	203
17	Jackson State	200
18	Northern Arizona	168
19	Western Carolina	147
20	Southern Illinois	132
21	Monmouth	116
22т	Richmond	111
22т	Tennessee Tech	111
24	Stephen F. Austin	82
25	Stony Brook	69

STATS Perform
Rk	Team	Pts
1	North Dakota State (54)	1,398
2	Montana State (1)	1,335
3	South Dakota State	1,266
4	South Dakota (1)	1,227
5	Incarnate Word	1,138
6	Illinois State	1,015
7	Montana	1,004
8	UC Davis	938
9	Rhode Island	928
10	Tarleton State	912
11	Mercer	824
12	Idaho	747
13	Villanova	737
14	Lehigh	493
15	Sacramento State	492
16	Abilene Christian	436
17	Jackson State	336
18	Western Carolina	335
19	Northern Arizona	312
20	Southern Illinois	310
21	Tennessee Tech	284
22	Monmouth	274
23	Stephen F. Austin	183
24	Stony Brook	181
25	Richmond	154

=== Final rankings ===
AFCA Coaches
Rk	Team	Pts
1	Montana State (21)	525
2	Illinois State	504
3	Montana	472
4	Villanova	427
5	North Dakota State	426
6	Tarleton State	419
7	Stephen F. Austin	369
8	UC Davis	359
9	Lehigh	358
10	Rhode Island	304
11	South Dakota	295
12	Abilene Christian	257
13	Yale	235
14	South Dakota State	209
15	Tennessee Tech	206
16	North Dakota	192
17	Youngstown State	190
18	Mercer	186
19	Southeastern Louisiana	172
20	Monmouth	112
21	Lamar	105
22	Jackson State	103
23	Harvard	78
24	West Georgia	68
25	South Carolina State	59

STATS Perform
Rk	Team	Pts
1	Montana State (56)	1,400
2	Illinois State	1,327
3	Montana	1,271
4т	North Dakota State	1,181
4т	Villanova	1,181
6	Tarleton State	1,112
7	Stephen F. Austin	992
8	UC Davis	985
9	South Dakota	947
10	Lehigh	902
11	Rhode Island	816
12	Abilene Christian	711
13	South Dakota State	686
14	North Dakota	633
15	Yale	628
16	Tennessee Tech	607
17	Mercer	584
18	Youngstown State	433
19	Southeastern Louisiana	358
20	Harvard	242
21	South Carolina State	206
22	Monmouth	187
23	New Hampshire	165
24	Lamar	159
25	Southern Illinois	147

== Coaching changes ==
=== Preseason and in-season ===
This is restricted to coaching changes that took place on or after May 1, 2025, and will include any changes announced after a team's last regularly scheduled games but before its playoff games. For coaching changes that occurred earlier in 2025, see 2024 NCAA Division I FCS end-of-season coaching changes.

School	Outgoing coach	Date	Reason	Replacement
Southern	Terrence Graves	October 20, 2025	Fired	Fred McNair (interim)
Samford	Chris Hatcher	November 9, 2025	Fired	Scot Sloan (interim)
Weber State	Mickey Mental	November 10, 2025	Fired	Brent Myers (interim)

=== End of season ===
This list includes coaching changes announced during the season that did not take effect until the end of the season.

School	Outgoing coach	Date	Reason	Replacement	Previous position
Portland State	Bruce Barnum	November 22, 2025	Fired	Chris Fisk	Central Washington head coach (2019–2025)
Cal Poly	Paul Wulff	November 23, 2025	Fired	Tim Skipper	UCLA interim head coach (2025)
Hampton	Trenton Boykin	November 23, 2025	Fired	Van Malone	Kansas State assistant head coach/passing game coordinator/cornerbacks coach (2020–2025)
Penn	Ray Priore	November 24, 2025	Resigned	Ricky Santos	New Hampshire head coach (2022–2025)
Southern	Fred McNair (interim)	November 30, 2025	Permanent replacement	Marshall Faulk	Colorado running backs coach (2025)
Samford	Scot Sloan (interim)	December 3, 2025	Permanent replacement	John Grass	Clemson senior offensive analyst/assistant quarterbacks coach (2024–2025)
Sacramento State	Brennan Marion	December 5, 2025	Hired as offensive coordinator at Colorado	Alonzo Carter	Arizona assistant head coach/running backs coach (2024–2025)
Bucknell	Dave Cecchini	December 8, 2025	Fired	Jeff Behrman	John Carroll head coach (2023–2025)
Florida A&M	James Colzie III	December 8, 2025	Fired	Quinn Gray	Albany State head coach (2023–2025)
Mercer	Mike Jacobs	December 10, 2025	Hired by Toledo	Joel Taylor	West Georgia head coach (2024–2025)
Monmouth	Kevin Callahan	December 11, 2025	Transitioned to advisory role	Jeff Gallo	Monmouth offensive coordinator (2019–2025)
West Georgia	Joel Taylor	December 11, 2025	Hired by Mercer	Steve Englehart	Presbyterian head coach (2022–2025)
New Hampshire	Ricky Santos	December 13, 2025	Hired by Penn	Sean Goldrich	Delaware quarterbacks coach/pass game coordinator/recruiting coordinator (2025)
Gardner-Webb	Cris Reisert	December 15, 2025	Resigned	Kris McCullough	UT Permain Basin head coach (2023–2025)
Howard	Larry Scott	December 15, 2025	Hired as tight ends coach at Auburn	Ted White	Maryland offensive analyst (2025)
Weber State	Brent Myers (interim)	December 16, 2025	Permanent replacement	Eric Kjar	Corner Canyon HS head coach (2017–2025)
VMI	Danny Rocco	December 16, 2025	Resigned	Ashley Ingram	Carson–Newman head coach (2024–2025)
Presbyterian	Steve Englehart	December 17, 2025	Hired by West Georgia	Matt Rahl	Presbyterian offensive line coach/run game coordinator/recruiting coordinator (Offense) (2024–2025)
Albany	Jared Ambrose (interim)	December 23, 2025	Permanent replacement	Tom Perkovich	Susquehanna head coach (2015–2025)
Mercyhurst	Ryan Riemedio	January 28, 2026	Hired as defensive coordinator by Youngstown State	Thomas Sydeski	Mercyhurst offensive coordinator and quarterbacks coach (2024–2025)
Montana	Bobby Hauck	February 4, 2026	Retired	Bobby Kennedy	Montana wide receivers coach (2025)
South Dakota	Travis Johansen	February 6, 2026	Hired as defensive coordinator by Rutgers	Matt Vitzthum	South Dakota co-offensive coordinator/quarterbacks coach (2025)
Drake	Joe Woodley	February 9, 2026	Hired as assistant coach by Rutgers	Matt Walker	Wisconsin–River Falls head coach (2011–2025)
Yale	Tony Reno	February 17, 2026	Resigned	Kevin Cahill	Lehigh head coach (2023–2025)
Lehigh	Kevin Cahill	February 23, 2026	Hired by Yale	Rich Nagy	Lehigh defensive coordinator (2023–2025)

== See also ==
- 2025 NCAA Division I FBS football season
- 2025 NCAA Division II football season
- 2025 NCAA Division III football season
- 2025 NAIA football season
- 2025 U Sports football season
