= 2023 Texas State Bobcats football team =

American college football season

2023 Texas State Bobcats football

First Responder Bowl champion

First Responder Bowl, W 45–21 vs. Rice
- Conference: Sun Belt Conference
- West Division
- Record: 8–5 (4–4 Sun Belt)
- Head coach: G. J. Kinne (1st season)
- Offensive coordinator: Mack Leftwich (1st season)
- Offensive scheme: Run and gun
- Defensive coordinator: Jonathan Patke (1st season)
- Base defense: 4–2–5
- Home stadium: Bobcat Stadium

2023 Sun Belt Conference football standings
	Conf.			Overall
Team	W		L	W		L
East Division
James Madison* x	7	–	1	11	–	2
Appalachian State y	6	–	2	9	–	5
Coastal Carolina	5	–	3	8	–	5
Old Dominion	5	–	3	6	–	7
Georgia State	3	–	5	7	–	6
Marshall	3	–	5	6	–	7
Georgia Southern	3	–	5	6	–	7
West Division
Troy xy$	7	–	1	11	–	3
Texas State	4	–	4	8	–	5
Arkansas State	4	–	4	6	–	7
South Alabama	4	–	4	7	–	6
Louisiana	3	–	5	6	–	7
Southern Miss	2	–	6	3	–	9
Louisiana–Monroe	0	–	8	2	–	10
Championship: Troy 49, Appalachian State 23
$ – Conference champion; x – Division champion/co-champions; y – Championship game participant; * – Ineligible for postseason play due to FCS-to-FBS transition rules

The 2023 Texas State Bobcats football team represented Texas State University as a member of the Sun Belt Conference during the 2023 NCAA Division I FBS football season. They were led by first-year head coach G. J. Kinne and played their home games at Bobcat Stadium in San Marcos, Texas.

The Bobcats finished the regular season 7–5, going 4–4 in Sun Belt play to finish second in the conference's West Division. Texas State was selected to a bowl game for the first time in program history and played Rice in the First Responder Bowl. The Bobcats would win the game 45–21 to finish the season with an overall record of 8–5; the eight wins broke the program record for most wins in a single season as an FBS program. The Bobcats also finished a season with a winning record for the first time since 2014.

== Offseason ==
=== Coaching changes ===
On November 27, 2022 the Bobcats fired their head coach Jake Spavital. On December 2, the Bobcats hired G. J. Kinne to be their next head coach. He was formerly the head coach at Incarnate Word.

On December 13, the Bobcats hired Mack Leftwich to be their offensive coordinator. On December 20, they named Kam Martin the running backs coach, Matthew Gregg the cornerbacks coach, and Dexter McCoil Sr. the safeties coach. Two days later, they named Jonathan Patke the defensive coordinator, Craig Stutzmann the receivers coach and pass game coordinator, and Bret Huth as the Assistant Athletic Director, Strength and Conditioning for Football. On December 23, Daniel Da Prato was hired as the special teams coordinator and associate head coach. They also named Will Bryant as their tight ends coach. On February 23, 2023, the Bobcats hired Chris Buckner as the co-wide receivers coach and Clay Jennings as the defensive back coach.

=== Recruiting class ===
College recruiting (2023)
Name	Hometown	School	Height	Weight	Commit date
PJ Hatter; ATH	Spring, TX	Westfield High	6 ft 2 in (1.88 m)	190 lb (86 kg)	Feb 1, 2023
PJ Hatter; ATH	Recruit ratings: Rivals: 247Sports: ESPN: (NR)				
Jo'Laison Landry; DE	Houston, TX	C.E. King High	6 ft 3 in (1.91 m)	230 lb (100 kg)	Jan 15, 2023
Jo'Laison Landry; DE	Recruit ratings: Rivals: 247Sports: ESPN: (76)				
Derick Mourning; LB	Kilgore, TX	Kilgore College	6 ft 3 in (1.91 m)	215 lb (98 kg)	Dec 26, 2022
Derick Mourning; LB	Recruit ratings: Rivals: 247Sports: ESPN: (NR)				
Chris Dawn Jr. WR	Mesquite, TX	Horn High	5 ft 8 in (1.73 m)	170 lb (77 kg)	Dec 17, 2022
Chris Dawn Jr. WR	Recruit ratings: Rivals: 247Sports: ESPN: (76)				
Bobby Crosby; DB	Cisco, TX	Cisco College	6 ft 2 in (1.88 m)	195 lb (88 kg)	Feb 1, 2023
Bobby Crosby; DB	Recruit ratings: Rivals: 247Sports: ESPN: (NR)				
Justin DeLeon; OL	Kingsville, TX	H. M. King High	6 ft 3 in (1.91 m)	290 lb (130 kg)	Feb 1, 2023
Justin DeLeon; OL	Recruit ratings: Rivals: 247Sports: ESPN: (77)				
Kalil Alexander; DE	Coffeyville, KS	Coffeyville Community College	6 ft 3 in (1.91 m)	215 lb (98 kg)	Feb 1, 2023
Kalil Alexander; DE	Recruit ratings: Rivals: 247Sports: ESPN: (NR)				
Dontavius Burrows; DB	Tyler, TX	Tyler Junior College	6 ft 0 in (1.83 m)	200 lb (91 kg)	Jan 30, 2023
Dontavius Burrows; DB	Recruit ratings: Rivals: 247Sports: ESPN: (NR)				
Terry Webb; DT	Kilgore, TX	Kilgore College	6 ft 3 in (1.91 m)	300 lb (140 kg)	Jan 19, 2023
Terry Webb; DT	Recruit ratings: Rivals: 247Sports: ESPN: (NR)				
Donerio Davenport; RB	Kilgore, TX	Kilgore College	6 ft 0 in (1.83 m)	205 lb (93 kg)	Dec 21, 2022
Donerio Davenport; RB	Recruit ratings: Rivals: 247Sports: ESPN: (NR)				
Jake Simpson; TE	Frisco, TX	Independence High	6 ft 4 in (1.93 m)	220 lb (100 kg)	Dec 19, 2022
Jake Simpson; TE	Recruit ratings: Rivals: 247Sports: ESPN: (NR)				
Bami Badusi; OL	Arlington, TX	Mansfield Timberview High	6 ft 5 in (1.96 m)	310 lb (140 kg)	Dec 18, 2022
Bami Badusi; OL	Recruit ratings: Rivals: 247Sports: ESPN: (NR)				
Amarion Atwood; ATH	Mesquite, TX	Horn High	5 ft 11 in (1.80 m)	180 lb (82 kg)	Dec 17, 2022
Amarion Atwood; ATH	Recruit ratings: Rivals: 247Sports: ESPN: (73)				
Michael Boudoin III; DB	Corsicana, TX	Navarro College	6 ft 3 in (1.91 m)	205 lb (93 kg)	Dec 23, 2022
Michael Boudoin III; DB	Recruit ratings: Rivals: 247Sports: ESPN: (NR)				
Davon Martin; DB	Tyler, TX	Tyler Junior College	6 ft 1 in (1.85 m)	190 lb (86 kg)	Mar 27, 2023
Davon Martin; DB	Recruit ratings: Rivals: 247Sports: ESPN: (NR)				
Overall recruit ranking: Rivals: # 247Sports: #95
Note: In many cases, Scout, Rivals, 247Sports, On3, and ESPN may conflict in their listings of height and weight.; In these cases, the average was taken. ESPN grades are on a 100-point scale.; Sources: "Rivals commits". Rivals.; "ESPN commits". ESPN.; "2023 Team Ranking". Rivals.com.; "247Sports commits". 247Sports.

=== Media poll ===
In the Sun Belt preseason coaches' poll, the Bobcats were picked to finish in fifth place in the West division.

Defensive lineman Jordan Revels was named to the second team.

=== Transfers ===
==== Outgoing ====
Player	Position	Destination
Seth Keller	K	Kansas
Kyle Hergel	OL	Boston College
Ashtyn Hawkins	WR	Withdrew
Tory Spears	S	Unknown
DeJordan Mask	S	UCF
Kaydon Olivia	LS	South Dakota State
Jarron Morris	CB	Florida Atlantic
Levi Bell	DL	Unknown
Layne Hatcher	QB	Ball State
Issiah Nixon	LB	Unknown
Lincoln Pare	RB	Withdrew
Dalton Cooper	OT	Oklahoma State
Davon Sears	DL	Oklahoma
Kevin Anderson	S	Lamar
Jordan Revels	DE	Withdrew
Micah Hilts	TE	SMU
Silas Robinson	OL	Incarnate Word
Alex Costilla	OL	Incarnate Word
Liam Dick	OL	Unknown
David Hensley	OL	Tyler JC
Jackson Schultze	OT	FIU
Donnovan Moorer	WR	Unknown
Demarcus Gregory	WR	Central Missouri
Nace Washington	LB	Tarleton State
Kajuan Robinson	DL	Unknown
Ahmirr Robinson	WR	Montclair State
Bernock Iya	CB	Unknown
Waydale Jones	WR	Abilene Christian
DeOnte Washington	DL	Bethune–Cookman
Samuel Obiang	DL	Towson
Pierre Kemeni	CB	Garden City CC

==== Incoming ====
Player	Position	Previous School
Danny Valenzuela	OL	Arizona State
Malik Hornsby	QB	Arkansas
T. J. Finley	QB	Auburn
Deven Wright	DL	Boise State
Drew Donley	WR	Cincinnati
Alex Harkey	OL	Colorado
Brady Radz	LS	Colorado State
Christian Rorie	DL	Duke
John Blunt Jr.	S	Eastern Kentucky
Chayse Todd	OL	Houston
Ismail Mahdi	RB	Houston Baptist
Nash Jones	OT	Incarnate Word
Kole Wilson	WR	Incarnate Word
Emeka Obigbo	OL	Incarnate Word
Jimeto Obigbo	OT	Incarnate Word
Caleb Johnson	OT	Incarnate Word
Dorion Strawn	OL	Incarnate Word
Kaleb Culp	S	Incarnate Word
Sam Latham	DL	Incarnate Word
Shawn Holton	CB	Incarnate Word
Sean Shaw Jr.	WR	Iowa State
Konner Fox	TE	Kansas State
Dan Foster	LB	Marshall
Shadeed Ahmed	WR	Marshall
Darius Jackson	CB	Missouri
Jason Gold	DL	Northwestern
Cedric Roberts	DL	Oklahoma
Joshua Eaton	CB	Oklahoma
Marcus Alexander	OL	Oklahoma
Brey Walker	OL	Oklahoma
Beau Corrales	WR	SMU
Simon Gonzalez	TE	SMU
Bryce Cage	DE	Southeastern Louisiana
Derrick Brown	LB	Texas
Ismail Mahdi	RB	UConn
Tavian Coleman	DL	Utah State
Joey Hobert	WR	Utah Tech
Kaleb Ford-Dement	CB	Washington State
Caleb Coleman	CB	West Virginia
Jaylon Shelton	S	West Virginia

== Schedule ==
The football schedule was announced February 24, 2023.

Date	Time	Opponent	Site	TV	Result	Attendance
September 2	6:00 p.m.	at Baylor*	McLane Stadium; Waco, TX	ESPN+	W 42–31	44,945
September 9	2:30 p.m.	at UTSA*	Alamodome; San Antonio, TX (I-35 Rivalry)	ESPN+	L 13–20	49,342
September 16	7:30 p.m.	Jackson State*	Bobcat Stadium; San Marcos, TX	ESPN+	W 77–34	24,118
September 23	6:00 p.m.	Nevada*	Bobcat Stadium; San Marcos, TX	ESPN+	W 35–24	19,257
September 30	6:00 p.m.	at Southern Miss	M. M. Roberts Stadium; Hattiesburg, MS	ESPN+	W 50–36	21,304
October 7	2:30 p.m.	at Louisiana	Cajun Field; Lafayette, LA	ESPNU	L 30–34	15,053
October 14	6:00 p.m.	Louisiana–Monroe	Bobcat Stadium; San Marcos, TX	ESPN+	W 21–20	27,537
October 28	7:00 p.m.	Troy^{†}	Bobcat Stadium; San Marcos, TX	ESPN+	L 13–31	22,369
November 4	4:00 p.m.	Georgia Southern	Bobcat Stadium; San Marcos, TX	ESPN+	W 45–24	18,204
November 11	2:30 p.m.	at Coastal Carolina	Brooks Stadium; Conway, SC	ESPN+	L 23–31	15,832
November 18	2:00 p.m.	at Arkansas State	Centennial Bank Stadium; Jonesboro, AR	ESPN+	L 31–77	16,721
November 25	6:00 p.m.	South Alabama	Bobcat Stadium; San Marcos, TX	NFLN	W 52–44	15,617
December 26	4:30 p.m.	vs. Rice*	Gerald J. Ford Stadium; University Park, TX (First Responder Bowl)	ESPN	W 45–21	26,542
*Non-conference game; ^{†}Homecoming; Rankings from AP Poll and CFP Rankings released prior to game; All times are in Central time

== Personnel ==
2023 Texas State Bobcats football team roster
Players
Coaches
Offense

Pos.	#	Name	Class
WR	0	Shadeed Ahmed	Sr
WR	1	Ashtyn Hawkins	Jr
WR	2	Kole Wilson	So
WR	3	Beau Corrales	Sr
QB	4	Malik Hornsby	Jr
WR	5	Sean Shaw Jr.	Sr
QB	6	PJ Hatter	Fr
QB	7	T. J. Finley	So
RB	8	Donerio Davenport	Jr
TE	9	Konner Fox	Jr
WR	10	Joey Hobert	Jr
RB	11	Calvin Hill	Jr
QB	12	CJ Rogers	So
QB	14	Karson Kaiser	Fr
WR	16	Chris Dawn Jr.	Fr
WR	17	Julian Ortega-Jones	Sr
WR	18	Drew Donley	So
WR	19	Dylan Rhodes	Fr
RB	20	Josh Berry	Jr
RB	21	Ismail Mahdi	So
RB	22	Lincoln Pare	Jr
WR	23	Xayvion Noland	Fr
WR	27	Kannon Webb	So
RB	28	Jahmyl Jeter	Sr
WR	29	Brandon Treggs	Fr
RB	30	Trent Lacy	Fr
RB	32	Damarius Good	Jr
TE	41	Gage Patrick	Fr
OL	52	Trenton Scott	So
OL	53	Danny Valenzuela	So
OL	56	Marcus Alexander	Jr
OL	62	Malcolm Fields	Fr
OL	63	Aidin Rhodes	Fr
OL	64	Dorion Strawn	So
OL	65	Emeka Obigbo	So
OL	66	Carter Traynor	Fr
OL	67	Quattro Perez	Fr
OL	69	Freddy Murphy	Fr
OL	70	Brey Walker	Sr
OL	71	Alex Harkey	So
OL	72	Justin DeLeon	Fr
OL	73	Jimeto Obigbo	Jr
OL	74	Caleb Johnson	Sr
OL	75	Bami Badusi	Fr
OL	76	Nash Jones	Jr
OL	77	Chayse Todd	Jr
OL	78	Ian Hover	Sr
OL	79	Jaydan Smith	Sr
TE	80	Jake Simpson	Fr
WR	81	Landon Marsh	Fr
WR	82	Isaac Norris	Fr
TE	83	Simon Gonzalez	Jr
TE	84	Joseph Moreland	Fr
WR	85	Brooks McCoy	So
TE	86	Titus Lyons	So
TE	87	Caleb Godfrey	So
WR	88	Langston Anderson	Jr

Defense

Pos.	#	Name	Class
LB	0	Brian Holloway	Sr
CB	1	Joshua Eaton	So
CB	2	Kaleb Ford-Dement	Sr
LB	3	Dan Foster Jr.	Jr
CB	4	Alonzo Edwards, Jr.	Jr
S	5	Darius Jackson	So
DE	6	Jo'Laison Landry	Fr
CB	7	Chris Mills	Jr
DE	8	Jordan Revels	Sr
DE	9	Sam Latham	Sr
DT	10	Jason Gold Jr.	Jr
DE	11	Deven Wright	Jr
S	12	Tory Spears	Sr
CB	13	John Blunt Jr.	Sr
LB	14	Kenny Haynes	Jr
CB	15	Rodrick Hockley	Sr
S	16	Javen Ware	Jr
LB	18	Derick Mourning Jr.	So
LB	19	CJ Williams	Sr
S	20	Kaleb Culp	Jr
CB	21	Amarion Atwood	Fr
DE	22	Kalil Alexander	So
S	23	Shawn Holton	Sr
DE	24	Devin Martinez	Jr
S	25	Ronnie Hamrick II	So
NB	26	Michael Boudoin III	Jr
S	27	Bobby Crosby	Jr
CB	28	Jaylon Shelton	So
S	29	Caleb Coleman	So
LB	30	Josh Emmanuel	Jr
NB	31	DeMarrquese Hayes	Jr
LB	32	John Emmanuel	So
DE	33	Ben Bell	Jr
CB	34	Charles Brown	So
S	35	Jonathan James	So
S	39	Shon Coleman	So
DE	40	Chance Main	Sr
S	41	Kaden Watts	Fr
DE	42	Victor Obi	Sr
NB	48	Donovan Malone	Fr
LB	49	Dontavius Burrows	Jr
S	50	Justin Strong	Fr
LB	56	Owen McClintock	So
DE	57	TJ Chirebvu	Fr
LB	58	Conner Motsinger	So
DE	61	Carson Klaerner	Fr
DT	62	Nathan Huerta	So
DE	90	Bryce Cage	So
DT	91	Tavian Coleman	Jr
DT	93	Christian Rorie	Jr
DT	94	Kamren Washington	So
DT	95	Terry Webb	Jr
DT	97	Dominique Ratcliff	So
DT	99	Myron Warren	Jr
CB		Kerrym Truehill	Fr

Special teams

Pos.	#	Name	Class
K	36	Mason Shipley	So
P	37	Darius Green	Fr
P	38	David Nunez	So
K	43	Michael James	Fr
LS	44	Brady Radz	Fr
LS	45	John Oehrlein	Jr
LS	46	Durham Harris	Jr
K	47	Matthew Velasco	Fr
P	99	Seamus O'Kelly	Sr

Head coach

- G. J. Kinne

Coordinators/assistant coaches

- Mack Leftwich (offensive coordinator)
- Jonathan Patke (defensive coordinator)
- Daniel Da Prato (special teams/associate head coach)
- Will Bryant (tight ends)
- Jordan Shoemaker (offensive line/run game)
- Eric Stephens (running backs)
- Craig Stutzmann (wide receivers/passing game)
- Matthew Gregg (cornerbacks)
- Dexter McCoil, Sr. (safeties)
- Mike O'Guin (defensive line)

Legend

- (C) Team captain
- (S) Suspended
- (I) Ineligible
- Injured
- Redshirt

Roster
Last update: August 23, 2023

=== Staff ===
Name	Position	Consecutive season at Texas State in current position
G. J. Kinne	Head coach	1st
Mack Leftwich	Offensive coordinator	1st
Jonathan Patke	Defensive coordinator	1st
Daniel Da Prato	Special teams/associate head coach	1st
Will Bryant	Tight ends	1st
Jordan Shoemaker	Offensive line/run game	1st
Eric Stephens	Running backs	1st
Craig Stutzmann	Wide receivers/passing game	1st
Matthew Gregg	Cornerbacks	1st
Dexter McCoil, Sr.	Safeties	1st
Mike O'Guin	Defensive line	1st

== Game summaries ==
=== At Baylor ===
Texas State Bobcats at Baylor Bears – Game summary

Quarter	1	2	3	4	Total
Bobcats	14	14	7	7	42
Bears	6	7	11	7	31

at McLane Stadium, Waco, Texas

- Date: September 2
- Game time: 6:00 p.m. CDT
- Game weather: Sunny, 99 °F (37 °C)
- Game attendance: 44,945
- Referee: David Alvarez
- TV announcers (ESPN+): Peter Sousa and LaDarrin McLane
- Box score, Recap

Game information
First quarter
- BAY – Isaiah Hankins 23-yard field goal, 10:17. Bears 3–0. Drive: 8 plays, 59 yards, 3:55.
- TXST – Ismail Mahdi 10-yard pass from T. J. Finley (Mason Shipley kick), 7:33. Bobcats 7–3. Drive: 8 plays, 75 yards, 2:44.
- BAY – Isaiah Hankins 53-yard field goal, 2:26. Bobcats 7–6. Drive: 5 plays, 0 yards, 2:36.
- TXST – Ismail Mahdi 65-yard run (Mason Shipley kick), 1:21. Bobcats 14–6. Drive: 3 plays, 72 yards, 1:00.

Second quarter

- TXST – Donerio Davenport 27-yard pass from T. J. Finley (Mason Shipley kick), 9:11. Bobcats 21–6. Drive: 13 plays, 60 yards, 5:36.
- BAY – Blake Shapen 9-yard run (Isaiah Hankins kick), 4:06. Bobcats 21–13. Drive: 9 plays, 72 yards, 4:57.
- TXST – Jahmyl Jeter 1-yard run (Mason Shipley kick), 0:48. Bobcats 28–13. Drive: 12 plays, 75 yards, 3:18.

Third quarter

- BAY – Drake Dabney 53-yard pass from Blake Shapen (Blake Shapen pass to Ketron Jackson Jr.), 13:21. Bobcats 28–21. Drive: 3 plays, 62 yards, 1:33.
- TXST – T. J. Finley 16-yard run (Mason Shipley kick), 10:18. Bobcats 35–21. Drive: 8 plays, 75 yards, 3:03.
- BAY – Isaiah Hankins 24-yard field goal, 1:47. Bobcats 35–24. Drive: 9 plays, 38 yards, 2:12.

Fourth quarter

- TXST – Joey Herbert 26-yard pass from T. J. Finley (Mason Shipley kick), 13:52. Bobcats 42–24. Drive: 6 plays, 75 yards, 2:55.
- BAY – Drake Dabney 2-yard pass from Blake Shapen (Isaiah Hankins kick), 8:52. Bobcats 42–31. Drive: 12 plays, 78 yards, 4:53.

Statistics	TXST	BAY
First downs	20	22
Total yards	441	524
Rushing yards	143	108
Passing yards	298	416
Turnovers	2	2
Time of possession	26:12	33:48

Team	Category	Player	Statistics
Texas State	Passing	T. J. Finley	22/30, 298 yards, 3 TD
Texas State	Rushing	Ismail Mahdi	6 rushes, 83 yards, TD
Texas State	Receiving	Joey Hobert	6 receptions, 105 yards, TD
Baylor	Passing	Blake Shapen	21/31, 303 yards, 2 TD
Baylor	Rushing	Dominic Richardson	16 rushes, 79 yards
Baylor	Receiving	Drake Dabney	6 receptions, 101 yards, 2 TD

=== At UTSA ===
Texas State Bobcats at UTSA Roadrunners – Game summary

Quarter	1	2	3	4	Total
Bobcats	0	10	0	3	13
Roadrunners	3	7	7	3	20

at Alamodome, San Antonio, Texas

- Date: September 9
- Game time: 2:30 p.m. CDT
- Game weather: None (played indoors)
- Game attendance: 49,342
- Referee: Kevin Randall
- TV announcers (ESPN+): Lincoln Rose, Stanford Routt, and Morgan Uber
- Box score, Recap

Game information
First quarter
- UTSA – Chase Allen 46-yard field goal, 3:01. Roadrunners 3–0. Drive: 11 plays, 39 yards, 3:54.

Second quarter

- UTSA – Rocko Griffin 20-yard run (Chase Allen kick), 12:48. Roadrunners 10–0. Drive: 6 plays, 57 yards, 1:57.
- TXST – Jahmyl Jeter 3-yard run (Mason Shipley kick), 5:11. Roadrunners 10–7. Drive: 11 plays, 66 yards, 3:50.
- TXST – Mason Shipley 42-yard field goal, 0:16. Tied 10–10. Drive: 8 plays, 64 yards, 1:12.

Third quarter

- UTSA – Willie McCoy 20-yard pass from Frank Harris (Chase Allen kick), 3:14. Roadrunners 17–10. Drive: 8 plays, 68 yards, 2:38.

Fourth quarter

- TXST – Mason Shipley 43-yard field goal, 10:37. Roadrunners 17–13. Drive: 5 plays, 36 yards, 2:31.
- UTSA – Chase Allen 43-yard field goal, 5:47. Roadrunners 20–13. Drive: 14 plays, 46 yards, 4:42.

Statistics	TXST	UTSA
First downs	13	28
Total yards	242	372
Rushing yards	31	158
Passing yards	211	214
Turnovers	0	1
Time of possession	22:37	37:23

Team	Category	Player	Statistics
Texas State	Passing	T. J. Finley	16/30, 211 yards
Texas State	Rushing	Ismail Mahdi	6 rushes, 23 yards
Texas State	Receiving	Drew Donley	5 receptions, 79 yards
UTSA	Passing	Frank Harris	26/37, 214 yards, TD
UTSA	Rushing	Kevorian Barnes	26 rushes, 103 yards
UTSA	Receiving	Tykee Ogle-Kellogg	6 receptions, 78 yards

=== Jackson State ===
Jackson State Tigers at Texas State Bobcats – Game summary

Quarter	1	2	3	4	Total
Tigers	6	14	7	7	34
Bobcats	21	35	7	14	77

at Bobcat Stadium, San Marcos, Texas

- Date: September 16
- Game time: 7:30 p.m. CDT
- Game weather: Cloudy
- Game attendance: 24,118
- Referee: Marshall Lewis
- TV announcers (ESPN+): Brant Freeman, Keith Moreland, and Koral Riggs
- Box score, Recap

Game information
First quarter
- TXST – Ismail Mahdi 56-yard run (Mason Shipley kick), 14:18. Bobcats 7–0. Drive: 2 plays, 71 yards, 0:35.
- TXST – Drew Donley 14-yard pass from T. J. Finley (Mason Shipley kick), 8:37. Bobcats 14–0. Drive: 10 plays, 76 yards, 3:56.
- JKST – Jason Brown 7-yard run (kick blocked), 4:35. Bobcats 14–6. Drive: 11 plays, 75 yards, 4:02.
- TXST – Jahmyl Jeter 15-yard run (Mason Shipley kick), 2:46. Bobcats 21–6. Drive: 5 plays, 66 yards, 1:43.

Second quarter

- JKST – Irv Mulligan 9-yard run (Matt Noll kick), 13:47. Bobcats 21–13. Drive: 11 plays, 85 yards, 3:52.
- TXST – Donerio Davenport 9-yard run (Mason Shipley kick), 13:01. Bobcats 28–13. Drive: 2 plays, 14 yards, 0:34.
- JKST – Irv Mulligan 4-yard run (Matt Noll kick), 11:11. Bobcats 28–20. Drive: 3 plays, 65 yards, 1:50.
- TXST – T. J. Fi.nley 3-yard run (Mason Shipley kick), 9:48. Bobcats 35–20. Drive: 3 plays, 42 yards, 1:12.
- TXST – T. J Finley 6-yard run (Mason Shipley kick), 8:15. Bobcats 42–20. Drive: 4 plays, 59 yards, 1:18.
- TXST – Ashtyn Hawkins 27-yard pass from TJ Finley (Mason Shipley kick), 6:14. Bobcats 49–20. Drive: 1 play, 27 yards, 0:07.
- TXST – Kole Wilson 20-yard pass from TJ Finley (Mason Shipley kick), 0:24. Bobcats 56–20. Drive: 10 plays, 84 yards, 2:14.

Third quarter

- TXST – Jahmyl Jeter 3-yard run (Mason Shipley kick), 8:05. Bobcats 63–20. Drive: 8 plays, 84 yards, 3:10.
- JKST – Isaiah Spencer 9-yard pass from Zy McDonald (Mason Shipley kick), 2:48. Bobcats 63–27. Drive: 7 plays, 35 yards, 2:02.

Fourth quarter

- TXST – Malik Hornsby 24-yard run (Mason Shipley kick), 14:52. Bobcats 70–27. Drive: 7 plays, 84 yards, 2:50.
- JKST – Hayden Hagler 28-yard pass from Zy McDonald (Mason Shipley kick), 10:02. Bobcats 70–34. Drive: 10 plays, 64 yards, 4:41.
- TXST – Malik Hornsby 8-yard run (Mason Shipley kick), 6:48. Bobcats 77–34. Drive: 7 plays, 60 yards, 3:07.

Statistics	JKST	TXST
First downs	23	34
Total yards	400	684
Rushing yards	118	399
Passing yards	282	285
Turnovers	1	1
Time of possession	34:46	25:14

Team	Category	Player	Statistics
Jackson State	Passing	Jason Brown	16/26, 209 yards, INT
Jackson State	Rushing	Ahmad Miller	13 rushes, 98 yards
Jackson State	Receiving	Kobe Paul	2 receptions, 54 yards
Texas State	Passing	T. J. Finley	17/21, 251 yards, 3 TD
Texas State	Rushing	Malik Hornsby	10 rushes, 133 yards, 2 TD
Texas State	Receiving	Drew Donley	3 receptions, 83 yards, TD

=== Nevada ===
Nevada Wolf Pack at Texas State Bobcats – Game summary

Quarter	1	2	3	4	Total
Wolf Pack	10	7	0	7	24
Bobcats	0	0	21	14	35

at Bobcat Stadium, San Marcos, Texas

- Date: September 23
- Game time: 6:00 p.m. CDT
- Game weather: Sunny
- Game attendance: 19,257
- Referee: Javarro Edwards
- TV announcers (ESPN+): Brant Freeman, Keith Moreland, and Koral Riggs
- Box score, Recap

Game information
First quarter
- NEV – Brandon Talton 30-yard field goal, 9:27. Wolf Pack 3–0. Drive: 13 plays, 63 yards, 5:33.
- NEV – K. K. Meier 98-yard interception return (Brandon Talton kick), 5:08. Wolf Pack 10–0.

Second quarter

- NEV – Zac Welch 0-yard fumble return (Brandon Talton kick), 11:11. Wolf Pack 17–0.

Third quarter

- TXST – Joey Hobert 25-yard pass from T. J. Finley (Mason Shipley kick), 9:43. Wolf Pack 17–7. Drive: 10 plays, 75 yards, 5:17.
- TXST – Kole Wilson 77-yard pass from T. J. Finley (Mason Shipley kick), 3:42. Wolf Pack 17–14. Drive: 2 plays, 83 yards, 0:42.
- TXST – Ismail Mahdi 46-yard run (Mason Shipley kick), 0:49. Bobcats 21–17. Drive: 5 plays, 58 yards, 1:33.

Fourth quarter

- TXST – Ismail Mahdi 36-yard run (Mason Shipley kick), 8:30. Bobcats 28–17. Drive: 7 plays, 75 yards, 3:47.
- TXST – Malik Hornsby 13-yard run (Mason Shipley kick), 4:50. Bobcats 35–17. Drive: 3 plays, 34 yards, 1:25.
- NEV – A. J. Bianco 2-yard run (Brandon Talton kick), 0:57. Bobcats 35–24. Drive: 9 plays, 75 yards, 3:53.

Statistics	NEV	TXST
First downs	20	24
Total yards	353	574
Rushing yards	159	276
Passing yards	194	298
Turnovers	3	3
Time of possession	31:25	28:35

Team	Category	Player	Statistics
Nevada	Passing	Brendon Lewis	21/32, 151 yards, INT
Nevada	Rushing	Brandon Lewis	12 rushes, 89 yards
Nevada	Receiving	Isaiah Essissima	2 receptions, 67 yards
Texas State	Passing	T. J. Finley	25/31, 295 yards, 2 TD, INT
Texas State	Rushing	Ismail Mahdi	21 rushes, 216 yards, 2 TD
Texas State	Receiving	Kole Wilson	4 receptions, 93 yards, TD

The Bobcats' offense struggled in the first half, committing two turnovers, including an interception that was returned 98 yards for a touchdown, and failing to convert on 4th down as they were shutout in the half with the Wolf Pack leading 17–0 at half time. Texas State would come back in the 2nd half, scoring 35 unanswered points.

=== At Southern Miss ===
Texas State Bobcats at Southern Miss Golden Eagles – Game summary

Quarter	1	2	3	4	Total
Bobcats	28	14	0	8	50
Golden Eagles	3	7	6	20	36

at M. M. Roberts Stadium, Hattiesburg, Mississippi

- Date: September 30
- Game time: 6:00 p.m. CDT
- Game weather: Clear, 87 °F (31 °C)
- Game attendance: 21,304
- Referee: Ted Pitts
- TV announcers (ESPN+): Jason Baker and Larry Boyd
- Box score, Recap

Game information
First quarter
- TXST – Ismail Mahdi 100-yard kickoff return (Mason Shipley kick), 14:46. Bobcats 7–0.
- TXST – Kole Wilson 5-yard pass from T. J. Finley (Mason Shipley kick), 11:48. Bobcats 14–0. Drive: 6 plays, 21 yards, 2:46.
- TXST – Ismail Mahdi 3-yard run (Mason Shipley kick), 6:57. Bobcats 21–0. Drive: 7 plays, 74 yards, 2:37.
- USM – Andrew Stein 38-yard field goal, 1:16. Bobcats 21–3. Drive: 9 plays, 58 yards, 5:35.
- TXST – Joey Hobert 5-yard pass from T. J. Finley (Mason Shipey kick), 0:39. Bobcats 28–3. Drive: 3 plays, 75 yards, 0:37.

Second quarter

- USM – Frank Gore Jr. 1-yard run (Andrew Stein kick), 12:13. Bobcats 28–10. Drive: 9 plays, 75 yards, 3:26.
- TXST – Ismail Mahdi 23-yard run (Mason Shipley kick), 7:40. Bobcats 35–10. Drive: 4 plays, 84 yards, 1:28.
- TXST – Ismail Mahdi 8-yard run (Mason Shipley kick), 3:22. Bobcats 42–10. Drive: 7 plays, 64 yards, 3:09.

Third quarter

- USM – Tiaquelin Mims 11-yard pass from Billy Wiles (kick blocked), 12:28. Bobcats 42–16. Drive: 5 plays, 57 yards, 2:24.

Fourth quarter

- USM – Jakarius Caston 8-yard pass from Billy Wiles (Andrew Stein kick), 12:31. Bobcats 42–23. Drive: 10 plays, 80 yards, 4:51.
- USM – Billy Wiles 4-yard run (run failed), 10:52. Bobcats 42–29. Drive: 4 plays, 33 yards, 1:23.
- USM – Frank Gore Jr. 1-yard run (Andrew Stein kick), 6:16. Bobcats 42–36. Drive: 5 plays, 73 yards, 2:04.
- TXST – Malik Hornsby 14-yard run (Kole Wilson pass to Drew Donley), 1:39. Bobcats 50–36. Drive: 3 plays, 18 yards, 0:18.

Statistics	TXST	USM
First downs	22	28
Total yards	516	510
Rushing yards	178	235
Passing yards	338	275
Turnovers	3	2
Time of possession	23:22	36:38

Team	Category	Player	Statistics
Texas State	Passing	T. J. Finley	19/24, 338 yards, 2 TD
Texas State	Rushing	Ismail Mahdi	14 rushes, 89 yards, 3 TD
Texas State	Receiving	Joey Hobert	10 receptions, 126 yards, TD
Southern Miss	Passing	Billy Wiles	21/44, 275 yards, 2 TD, INT
Southern Miss	Rushing	Frank Gore Jr.	24 rushes, 123 yards, 2 TD
Southern Miss	Receiving	Latreal Jones	6 receptions, 124 yards

=== At Louisiana ===
Texas State Bobcats at Louisiana Ragin' Cajuns – Game summary

Quarter	1	2	3	4	Total
Bobcats	10	10	3	7	30
Ragin' Cajuns	7	7	7	13	34

at Cajun Field, Lafayette, Louisiana

- Date: October 7
- Game time: 2:30 p.m. CDT
- Game weather: Sunny, 71 °F (22 °C) • Wind: NE 14 MPH
- Game attendance: 15,053
- Referee: Trennis Livington
- TV announcers (ESPNU): Roy Philpott (play-by-play), Roddy Jones (analyst), and Taylor McGregor (sideline reporter)
- Box score, Recap

Game information
First quarter
- TXST – Ismail Mahdi 10-yard run (Mason Shipley kick), 12:10. Bobcats 7–0. Drive: 7 plays, 75 yards, 2:50.
- UL – Dre'lyn Washington 4-yard pass from Zeon Chriss (Kenneth Almendares kick), 7:43. Tied 7–7. Drive: 10 plays, 70 yards, 4:27.
- TXST – Mason Shipley 37-yard field goal, 4:21. Bobcats 10–7. Drive: 13 plays, 60 yards, 3:16.

Second quarter

- TXST – Kole Wilson 2-yard pass from T. J. Finley (Mason Shipley kick), 14:24. Bobcats 17–7. Drive: 9 plays, 48 yards, 2:48.
- TXST – Mason Shipley 24-yard field goal, 6:46. Bobcats 20–7. Drive: 9 plays, 92 yards, 5:03.
- UL – Peter LeBlanc 34-yard pass from Zeon Chriss (Kenneth Almendares kick), 3:56. Bobcats 20–14. Drive: 6 plays, 67 yards, 2:43.

Third quarter

- TXST – Mason Shipley 33-yard field goal, 6:59. Bobcats 23–14. Drive: 13 plays, 54 yards, 5:52.
- UL – Zylan Perry 6-yard run (Kenneth Almendares kick), 3:45. Bobcats 23–21. Drive: 7 plays, 82 yards, 3:06.

Fourth quarter

- TXST – Joey Hobert 18-yard pass from T. J. Finley (Mason Shipley kick), 10:14. Bobcats 30–21. Drive: 10 plays, 69 yards, 4:29.
- UL – Robert Williams 5-yard pass from Zeon Chriss (Kenneth Almendares kick), 5:54. Bobcats 30–28. Drive: 11 plays, 63 yards, 4:10.
- UL – Zeon Chriss 8-yard run (pass failed), 2:21. Ragin' Cajuns 34–30. Drive: 4 plays, 22 yards, 2:12.

Statistics	TXST	UL
First downs	29	21
Total yards	530	423
Rushing yards	204	218
Passing yards	326	205
Turnovers	2	2
Time of possession	33:27	26:33

Team	Category	Player	Statistics
Texas State	Passing	T. J. Finley	30/40, 326 yards, 2 TD, INT
Texas State	Rushing	Ismail Mahdi	34 rushes, 188 yards, TD
Texas State	Receiving	Joey Hobert	8 receptions, 132 yards, TD
Louisiana	Passing	Zeon Chriss	13/17, 205 yards, 3 TD
Louisiana	Rushing	Zeon Chriss	12 rushes, 67 yards, TD
Louisiana	Receiving	Robert Williams	5 receptions, 90 yards, TD

=== Louisiana–Monroe ===
Louisiana–Monroe Warhawks at Texas State Bobcats – Game summary

Quarter	1	2	3	4	Total
Warhawks	7	0	3	10	20
Bobcats	3	6	0	12	21

at Bobcat Stadium, San Marcos, Texas

- Date: October 14
- Game time: 6:00 p.m.
- Game weather: Sunny, 77 °F (25 °C)
- Game attendance: 27,537
- Referee: Wayne Winkler
- TV announcers (ESPN+): Brant Freeman, Keith Moreland, and Koral Riggs
- Box score, Recap

Game information
First quarter
- TXST – Mason Shipley 29-yard field goal, 8:56. Bobcats 3–0. Drive: 17 plays, 69 yards, 6:04.
- ULM – Isaiah Woullard 10-yard pass from Jiya Wright (Derek McCormick kick), 3:24. Warhawks 7–3. Drive: 8 plays, 52 yards, 2:54.

Second quarter

- TXST – Mason Shipley 34-yard field goal, 14:09. Warhawks 7–6. Drive: 13 plays, 58 yards, 4:15.
- TXST – Mason Shipley 47-yard field goal, 7:06. Bobcats 9–7. Drive: 11 plays, 58 yards, 3:30.

Third quarter

- ULM – Derek McCormick 47-yard field goal, 8:24. Warhawks 10–9. Drive: 4 plays, 3 yards, 1:36.

Fourth quarter

- ULM – Derek McCormick 22-yard field goal, 14:58. Warhawks 13–9. Drive: 9 plays, 47 yards, 4:29.
- ULM – Ja'Terious Evans 76-yard interception return (Derek McCormick kick), 8:57. Warhawks 20–9.
- TXST – Joey Hobert 11-yard pass from T. J. Finley (pass failed), 4:16. Warhawks 20–15. Drive: 13 plays, 75 yards, 4:41.
- TXST – Joey Hobert 22-yard pass T. J. Finley (pass failed), 0:41. Bobcats 21–20. Drive: 11 plays, 76 yards, 2:34.

Statistics	ULM	TXST
First downs	14	29
Total yards	285	452
Rushing yards	135	230
Passing yards	150	222
Turnovers	0	1
Time of possession	22:42	37:18

Team	Category	Player	Statistics
Louisiana–Monroe	Passing	Jiya Wright	14/22, 150 yards, TD
Louisiana–Monroe	Rushing	Isaiah Woullard	14 rushes, 55 yards
Louisiana–Monroe	Receiving	Nolan Quinlan	3 receptions, 52 yards
Texas State	Passing	T. J. Finley	24/46, 222 yards, 2 TD, INT
Texas State	Rushing	Donerio Davenport	15 rushes, 94 yards
Texas State	Receiving	Joey Hobert	10 receptions, 110 yards, 2 TD

=== Troy ===
Troy Trojans at Texas State Bobcats – Game summary

Quarter	1	2	3	4	Total
Trojans	0	7	7	17	31
Bobcats	7	3	3	0	13

at Bobcat Stadium, San Marcos, Texas

- Date: October 28
- Game time: 7:00 p.m. CDT
- Game weather: Cloudy, 81 °F (27 °C)
- Game attendance: 22,369
- Referee: Scott Broadway
- TV announcers (ESPN+): Brant Freeman, Keith Moreland, and Koral Riggs
- Box score, Recap

Game information
First quarter
- TXST – Ashtyn Hawkins 28-yard pass from T. J. Finley (Mason Shipley kick), 12:25. Bobcats 7–0. Drive: 8 plays, 84 yards, 2:27.

Second quarter

- TROY – Gunnar Watson 3-yard run (Scott Taylor Renfroe kick), 14:02. Tied 7–7. Drive: 6 plays, 80 yards, 2:23.
- TXST – Mason Shipley 21-yard field goal, 1:49. Bobcats 10–7. Drive: 11 plays, 76 yards, 4:58.

Third quarter

- TROY – Jabre Barber 29-yard pass from Gunnar Watson (Scott Taylor Renfroe kick), 13:15. Trojans 14–10. Drive: 4 plays, 75 yards, 1:45.
- TXST – Mason Shipley 23-yard field goal, 8:16. Trojans 14–13. Drive: 11 plays, 69 yards, 4:59.

Fourth quarter

- TROY – Deshon Stoudemire 14-yard pass from Gunnar Watson (Scott Taylor Renfroe kick), 13:48. Trojans 21–13. Drive: 10 plays, 67 yards, 4:44.
- TROY – Landon Parker 4-yard pass from Gunnar Watson (Scott Taylor Renfroe kick), 10:22. Trojans 28–13. Drive: 4 plays, 32 yards, 1:54.
- TROY – Scott Taylor Renfroe 27-yard field goal, 1:26. Trojans 31–13. Drive: 7 plays, 16 yards, 3:22.

Statistics	TROY	TXST
First downs	22	26
Total yards	420	437
Rushing yards	28	161
Passing yards	392	276
Turnovers	0	4
Time of possession	30:58	29:02

Team	Category	Player	Statistics
Troy	Passing	Gunnar Watson	26/40, 392 yards, 3 TD
Troy	Rushing	Kimani Vidal	18 rushes, 43 yards
Troy	Receiving	Jabre Barber	10 receptions, 160 yards, TD
Texas State	Passing	T. J. Finley	24/38, 262 yards, TD, 3 INT
Texas State	Rushing	Ismail Mahdi	20 rushes, 128 yards
Texas State	Receiving	Kole Wilson	8 receptions, 71 yards

=== Georgia Southern ===
Georgia Southern Eagles at Texas State Bobcats – Game summary

Quarter	1	2	3	4	Total
Eagles	10	0	7	7	24
Bobcats	7	24	14	0	45

at Bobcat Stadium, San Marcos, Texas

- Date: November 4
- Game time: 4:00 p.m. CDT
- Game weather: Sunny
- Game attendance: 18,204
- Referee: Trennis Livingston
- TV announcers (ESPN+): Brant Freeman, Keith Moreland, and Koral Riggs
- Box score, Recap

Game information
First quarter
- TXST – Joey Hobert 23-yard pass from T. J. Finley (Mason Shipley kick), 12:45. Bobcats 7–0. Drive: 5 plays, 75 yards, 2:15.
- GASO – Michael Lantz 29-yard field goal, 11:09. Bobcats 7–3. Drive: 4 plays, 6 yards, 1:23.
- GASO – Jalen White 39-yard run (Michael Lantz kick), 3:36. Eagles 10–7. Drive: 7 plays, 73 yards, 3:05.

Second quarter

- TXST – Konner Fox 3-yard pass from T. J. Finley (Mason Shipley kick), 10:45. Bobcats 14–10. Drive: 15 plays, 75 yards, 7:51.
- TXST – Kole Wilson 8-yard pass from T. J. Finley (Mason Shipley kick), 3:46. Bobcats 21–10. Drive: 6 plays, 60 yards, 3:41.
- TXST – Mason Shipley 31-yard field goal, 2:04. Bobcats 24–10. Drive: 5 plays, 23 yards, 1:35.
- TXST – T. J. Finley 16-yard run (Mason Shipley kick), 0:42. Bobcats 31–10. Drive: 5 plays, 60 yards, 0:46.

Third quarter

- TXST – T. J. Finley 12-yard run (Mason Shipley kick), 9:52. Bobcats 38–10. Drive: 6 plays, 61 yards, 1:44.
- TXST – Donerio Davenport 1-yard run (Mason Shipley kick), 2:34. Bobcats 45–10. Drive: 11 plays, 74 yards, 4:40.
- GASO – Jjay McAfee 32-yard pass from Davis Brin (Michael Lantz kick), 0:25. Bobcats 45–17. Drive: 5 plays, 86 yards, 2:05.

Fourth quarter

- GASO – Jalen White 3-yard run (Michael Lantz kick), 8:40. Bobcats 45–24. Drive: 7 plays, 76 yards, 3:44.

Statistics	GASO	TXST
First downs	21	30
Total yards	375	487
Rushing yards	180	186
Passing yards	195	301
Turnovers	2	1
Time of possession	25:04	34:56

Team	Category	Player	Statistics
Georgia Southern	Passing	Davis Brin	18/27, 195 yards, TD, INT
Georgia Southern	Rushing	Jalen White	17 rushes, 159 yards, 2 TD
Georgia Southern	Receiving	Khaleb Hood	7 receptions, 67 yards
Texas State	Passing	T. J. Finley	25/31, 301 yards, 3 TD
Texas State	Rushing	Ismail Mahdi	20 rushes, 99 yards
Texas State	Receiving	Joey Hobert	13 receptions, 141 yards, TD

=== At Coastal Carolina ===
Texas State Bobcats at Coastal Carolina Chanticleers – Game summary

Quarter	1	2	3	4	Total
Bobcats	10	0	0	13	23
Chanticleers	7	14	7	3	31

at Brooks Stadium, Conway, South Carolina

- Date: November 11
- Game time: 2:30 p.m. CST/3:30 p.m. EST
- Game weather: Sunny
- Game attendance: 15,832
- Referee: Jeremy Parker
- TV announcers (ESPN+): Jeff McCarragher and Nate Ross
- Box score, Recap

Game information
First quarter
- TXST – Jahmyl Jeter 1-yard run (Mason Shipley kick), 11:14. Bobcats 7–0. Drive: 9 plays, 75 yards, 3:46.
- CCU – Kendall Karr 4-yard pass from Ethan Vasko (Kade Hensley kick), 4:39. Tied 7–7. Drive: 9 plays, 70 yards, 3:24.
- TXST – Mason Shipley 23-yard field goal, 0:08. Bobcats 10–7. Drive: 10 plays, 72 yards, 4:26.

Second quarter

- CCU – Sam Pickney 25-yard pass from Ethan Vasko (Kade Hensley kick), 8:18. Chanticleers 14–10. Drive: 9 plays, 82 yards, 4:11.
- CCU – Brayden Bennett 6-yard run (Kade Hensley kick), 1:57. Chanticleers 21–10. Drive: 10 plays, 70 yards, 4:57.

Third quarter

- CCU – Reese White 2-yard run (Kade Hensley kick), 7:16. Chanticleers 28–10. Drive: 14 plays, 94 yards, 7:32.

Fourth quarter

- CCU – Kade Hensley 25-yard field goal, 9:16. Chanticleers 31–10. Drive: 7 plays, 53 yards, 3:31.
- TXST – Malik Hornsby 8-yard run (Mason Shipley kick), 3:37. Chanticleers 31–17. Drive: 14 plays, 75 yards, 5:39.
- TXST – Malik Hornsby 4-yard run (kick failed), 0:44. Chanticleers 31–23. Drive: 10 plays, 51 yards, 2:53.

Statistics	TXST	CCU
First downs	15	23
Total yards	280	347
Rushing yards	199	188
Passing yards	81	159
Turnovers	0	0
Time of possession	25:42	34:18

Team	Category	Player	Statistics
Texas State	Passing	T. J. Finley	6/11, 49 yards
Texas State	Rushing	Ismail Mahdi	21 rushes, 97 yards
Texas State	Receiving	Kole Wilson	4 receptions, 35 yards
Coastal Carolina	Passing	Ethan Vasko	17/27, 145 yards, 2 TD
Coastal Carolina	Rushing	Reese White	12 rushes, 41 yards, TD
Coastal Carolina	Receiving	Sam Pickney	6 receptions, 81 yards, TD

=== At Arkansas State ===
Texas State Bobcats at Arkansas State Red Wolves – Game summary

Quarter	1	2	3	4	Total
Bobcats	10	7	7	7	31
Red Wolves	14	21	28	14	77

at Centennial Bank Stadium, Jonesboro, Arkansas

- Date: November 18
- Game time: 2:00 p.m. CST
- Game weather: Sunny, 59 °F (15 °C)
- Game attendance: 16,721
- Referee: Scott Broadway
- TV announcers (ESPN+): Roger Twibell, Pete Cordelli, and Darrell Greene
- Box score, Recap

Game information
First quarter
- TXST – Ismail Mahdi 4-yard run (Mason Shipley kick), 10:17. Bobcats 7–0. Drive: 11 plays, 65 yards, 4:43.
- ARST – Zak Wallace 41-yard run (Dominic Zvada kick), 8:45. Tied 7–7. Drive: 4 plays, 50 yards, 1:23.
- TXST – Mason Shipley 43-yard field goal, 6:50. Bobcats 10–7. Drive: 6 plays, 53 yards, 1:50.
- ARST – Zak Wallace 8-yard run (Dominic Zvada kick), 2:03. Red Wolves 14–10. Drive: 12 plays, 81 yards, 4:41.

Second quarter

- TXST – Joey Hobert 18-yard pass from T. J. Finley (Mason Shipley kick), 12:16. Bobcats 17–14. Drive: 6 plays, 76 yards, 1:57.
- ARST – Ja'Quez Cross 42-yard run (Dominic Zvada kick), 9:14. Red Wolves 21–17. Drive: 7 plays, 75 yards, 3:02.
- ARST – Ja'Quez Cross 15-yard run (Dominic Zvada kick), 4:01. Red Wolves 28–17. Drive: 1 play, 15 yards, 0:04.
- ARST – Ja'Quez Cross 57-yard run (Dominic Zvada kick), 1:52. Red Wolves 35–17. Drive: 3 plays, 67 yards, 0:53.

Third quarter

- ARST – Cedric Hawkins 9-yard run (Dominic Zvada kick), 12:39. Red Wolves 42–17. Drive: 6 plays, 55 yards, 2:16.
- ARST – Cedric Hawkins 7-yard run (Dominic Zvada kick), 8:20. Red Wolves 49–17. Drive: 7 plays, 80 yards, 2:33.
- ARST – Trevian Thomas 91-yard fumble return (Dominic Zvada kick), 5:57. Red Wolves 56–17.
- TXST – Kole Wilson 7-yard pass from T. J. Finley (Mason Shipley kick), 0:12. Red Wolves 56–24. Drive: 14 plays, 75 yards, 5:45.
- ARST – Ja'Quez Cross 93-yard kickoff return (Dominic Zvada kick), 0:00. Red Wolves 63–24.

Fourth quarter

- ARST – Melique Straker 87-yard interception return (Dominic Zvada kick), 12:20. Red Wolves 70–24.
- ARST – Dane Motley 50-yard interception return (Dominic Zvada kick), 10:39. Red Wolves 77–24.
- TXST – Kole Wilson 3-yard pass from T. J. Finley (Mason Shipley kick), 6:19. Red Wolves 77–31. Drive: 10 plays, 75 yards, 4:20.

Statistics	TXST	ARST
First downs	32	23
Total yards	539	487
Rushing yards	173	291
Passing yards	366	196
Turnovers	4	0
Time of possession	34:06	25:54

Team	Category	Player	Statistics
Texas State	Passing	T. J. Finley	37/55, 366 yards, 3 TD, 2 INT
Texas State	Rushing	Donerio Davenport	14 rushes, 76 yards
Texas State	Receiving	Ashtyn Hawkins	8 receptions, 165 yards
Arkansas State	Passing	Jaylen Raynor	14/17, 196 yards
Arkansas State	Rushing	Ja'Quez Cross	13 rushes, 139 yards, 3 TD
Arkansas State	Receiving	Courtney Jackson	7 receptions, 107 yards

=== South Alabama ===
South Alabama Jaguars at Texas State Bobcats – Game summary

Quarter	1	2	3	4	Total
Jaguars	0	17	7	20	44
Bobcats	24	7	7	14	52

at Bobcat Stadium, San Marcos, Texas

- Date: November 25
- Game time: 6:00 p.m. CST
- Game weather: Cloudy, 59 °F (15 °C)
- Game attendance: 15,617
- Referee: Javarro Edwards
- TV announcers (NFLN): Jason Ross Jr. and Tyoka Jackson
- Box score, Recap

Game information
First quarter
- TXST – Kaleb Culp 31-yard fumble return (Mason Shipley kick), 12:05. Bobcats 7–0.
- TXST – Ashtyn Hawkins 48-yard pass from T. J. Finley (Mason Shipley kick), 8:47. Bobcats 14–0. Drive: 6 plays, 73 yards, 1:39.
- TXST – Jahmyl Jeter 1-yard run (Mason Shipley kick), 3:38. Bobcats 21–0. Drive: 9 plays, 79 yards, 3:09.
- TXST – Mason Shipley 28-yard field goal, 1:05. Bobcats 24–0. Drive: 6 plays, 26 yards, 2:31.

Second quarter

- USA – Javon Ivory 39-yard pass from Carter Bradley (pass failed), 14:08. Bobcats 24–6. Drive: 6 plays, 67 yards, 1:57.
- TXST – Kole Wilson 100-yard kickoff return (Mason Shipley kick), 13:55. Bobcats 31–6.
- USA – Diego Guajardo 51-yard field goal, 7:06. Bobcats 31–9. Drive: 4 plays, -4 yards, 0:48.
- USA – D. J. Thomas-Jones 18-yard pass from Carter Bradley (Carter Bradley pass to D. J. Thomas-Jones), 0:08. Bobcats 31–17. Drive: 12 plays, 91 yards, 1:44.

Third quarter

- USA – D. J. Thomas-Jones 1-yard pass from Desmond Trotter (Diego Guajardo kick), 6:41. Bobcats 31–24. Drive: 7 plays, 83 yards, 3:07.
- TXST – Donerio Davenport 10-yard pass from T. J. Finley (Mason Shipley kick), 3:35. Bobcats 38–24. Drive: 7 plays, 75 yards, 3:06.

Fourth quarter

- USA – Caullin Lacy 12-yard pass from Desmond Trotter (pass failed), 12:57. Bobcats 38–30. Drive: 3 plays, 28 yards, 1:15.
- TXST – Kole Wilson 24-yard pass from T. J. Finley (Mason Shipley kick), 11:31. Bobcats 45–30. Drive: 4 plays, 67 yards, 1:19.
- USA – D. J. Thomas-Jones 3-yard pass from Desmond Trotter (pass failed), 4:04. Bobcats 45–36. Drive: 15 plays, 63 yards, 7:25.
- TXST – Ismail Mahdi 1-yard run (Mason Shipley kick), 3:04. Bobcats 52–36. Drive: 4 plays, 43 yards, 0:57.
- USA – Jacob Hopper 5-yard pass from Desmond Trotter (Desmond Trotter pass to Braylon McReynolds), 1:02. Bobcats 52–44. Drive: 8 plays, 60 yards, 1:52.

Statistics	USA	TXST
First downs	26	22
Total yards	476	479
Rushing yards	77	111
Passing yards	399	368
Turnovers	2	2
Time of possession	31:21	28:39

Team	Category	Player	Statistics
South Alabama	Passing	Desmond Trotter	18/21, 216 yards, 4 TD, INT
South Alabama	Rushing	Braylon McReynolds	19 rushes, 79 yards
South Alabama	Receiving	Caullin Lacy	11 receptions, 94 yards, TD
Texas State	Passing	T. J. Finley	19/28, 368 yards, 3 TD, INT
Texas State	Rushing	Ismail Mahdi	23 rushes, 97 yards, TD
Texas State	Receiving	Ashtyn Hawkins	5 receptions, 131 yards, TD

=== Vs. Rice (First Responder Bowl) ===
Texas State Bobcats vs. Rice Owls (2023 First Responder Bowl) – Game summary

Quarter	1	2	3	4	Total
Bobcats	14	10	14	7	45
Owls	7	14	0	0	21

at Gerald J. Ford Stadium, University Park, Texas

- Date: December 26
- Game time: 4:30 p.m. CST
- Game weather: Sunny, 55 °F (13 °C)
- Game attendance: 26,542
- Referee: Ed Ardito
- TV announcers (ESPN): Dave Neal, Aaron Murray, and Morgan Uber
- Box score, Recap

Game information
First quarter
- TXST – Jahmyl Jeter 29-yard run (Mason Shipley kick), 13:25. Bobcats 7–0. Drive: 7 plays, 75 yards, 1:35.
- RICE – Luke McCaffrey 7-yard pass from A. J. Padgett (Tim Horn kick), 6:54. Tied 7–7. Drive: 8 plays, 42 yards, 3:38.
- TXST – Jahmyl Jeter 1-yard run (Mason Shipley kick), 3:22. Bobcats 14–7. Drive: 8 plays, 85 yards, 3:32.

Second quarter

- TXST – Brian Holloway 36-yard interception return (Mason Shipley kick), 14:36. Bobcats 21–7.
- RICE – Dean Connors 3-yard run (Tim Horn kick), 6:07. Bobcats 21–14. Drive: 11 plays, 77 yards, 5:47.
- RICE – Dean Connors 28-yard run (Tim Horn kick), 3:40. Tied 21–21. Drive: 3 plays, 58 yards, 1:24.
- TXST – Mason Shipley 31-yard field goal, 0:00. Bobcats 24–21. Drive: 15 plays, 61 yards, 3:40.

Third quarter

- TXST – Nash Jones 3-yard run (Mason Shipley kick), 9:57. Bobcats 31–21. Drive: 10 plays, 30 yards, 5:03.
- TXST – Brian Holloway 48-yard interception return (Mason Shipley kick), 8:16. Bobcats 38–21.

Fourth quarter

- TXST – Jahmyl Jeter 1-yard run (Mason Shipley kick), 2:01. Bobcats 45–21. Drive: 3 plays, 38 yards, 1:14.

Statistics	TXST	RICE
First downs	15	16
Total yards	300	197
Rushing yards	148	85
Passing yards	152	112
Turnovers	0	6
Time of possession	30:17	29:43

Team	Category	Player	Statistics
Texas State	Passing	T. J. Finley	15/29, 152 yards
Texas State	Rushing	Ismail Mahdi	24 rushes, 122 yards
Texas State	Receiving	Ashtyn Hawkins	3 receptions, 55 yards
Rice	Passing	A. J. Padgett	10/21, 85 yards, TD, 3 INT
Rice	Rushing	Dean Connors	15 rushes, 64 yards, 2 TD
Rice	Receiving	Elijah Mojarro	3 receptions, 35 yards
