= 2023 First Responder Bowl =

Postseason college football bowl game

2023 Servpro First Responder Bowl
- 14th First Responder Bowl
Texas State Bobcats	Rice Owls
(7–5)	(6–6)
Sun Belt	The American
45	21
Head coach: G. J. Kinne	Head coach: Mike Bloomgren
	1	2	3	4	Total
Texas State	14	10	14	7	45
Rice	7	14	0	0	21
- Date: December 26, 2023
- Season: 2023
- Stadium: Gerald J. Ford Stadium
- Location: University Park, Texas
- MVP: Brian Holloway (LB, Texas State)
- Favorite: Texas State by 4.5
- Referee: Ed Ardito (CUSA)
- Attendance: 26,542

United States TV coverage
- Network: ESPN
- Announcers: Dave Neal (play-by-play), Aaron Murray (analyst), and Morgan Uber (sideline)

International TV coverage
- Network: ESPN Deportes

The 2023 First Responder Bowl was a college football bowl game played on December 26, 2023, at Gerald J. Ford Stadium in University Park, Texas. The 14th annual First Responder Bowl featured the Texas State Bobcats of the Sun Belt Conference and the Rice Owls of the American Athletic Conference (The American). The game began at approximately 4:30 p.m. CST and was aired on ESPN. It was one of the 2023–24 bowl games concluding the 2023 FBS football season. Sponsored by cleanup and restoration company Servpro, the game was officially known as the Servpro First Responder Bowl.

== Teams ==
The game featured the Texas State Bobcats of the Sun Belt Conference and the Rice Owls of the American Athletic Conference (The American).

This was the fifth meeting between Texas State and Rice; the series was tied at 2–2 entering the game. This was the first appearance in a First Responder Bowl for both teams.

=== Texas State Bobcats ===
The Bobcats entered the game with a 7–5 record (4–4 in the Sun Belt), tied for second place in their conference's West Division. After starting their season with four wins in their first five games, the Bobcats lost four of their final seven games.

This was the first bowl game in the football program history of Texas State.

=== Rice Owls ===
The Owls entered the game with a 6–6 record (4–4 in The American), tied for fifth place in the conference. After starting their season 4–3, the Owls had a three game losing streak, then won their final two games to become bowl eligible.

JT Daniels began the season as Rice's starting quarterback, but left the Owls' week nine game against SMU on November 1 with a concussion after taking a shot to the helmet in the second quarter. A month later, on December 1, Daniels announced that he would be retiring from football due to the multiple concussions he sustained during his career.

== Game summary ==
2023 Servpro First Responder Bowl

Quarter	1	2	3	4	Total
Texas State	14	10	14	7	45
Rice	7	14	0	0	21

at Gerald J. Ford Stadium • Dallas, Texas

- Date: Tuesday, December 26, 2023
- Game time: 4:30 p.m. CST
- Game weather: Sunny • Temperature: 55 °F (13 °C) • Wind: 11 mph (18 km/h) SW
- Game attendance: 26,542
- Referee: Ed Ardito
- TV announcers (ESPN): Dave Neal (play-by-play), Aaron Murray (analyst), and Morgan Uber (sideline)
- Box score

Game information

First Quarter

- (13:25) TXST – Jahmyl Jeter 29 yard run, Mason Shipley kick (Drive: 7 plays, 75 yards, 1:35; Texas State 7–0)
- (6:54) RICE – Luke McCaffrey 7 yard pass from A. J. Padgett, Tim Horn kick (Drive: 8 plays, 42 yards, 3:38; Tied 7–7)
- (3:22) TXST – Jahmyl Jeter 1 yard run, Mason Shipley kick (Drive: 8 plays, 85 yards, 3:32; Texas State 14–7)

Second Quarter

- (14:36) TXST – Brian Holloway 36 yard interception return, Mason Shipley kick (Texas State 21–7)
- (6:07) RICE – Dean Connors 3 yard run, Tim Horn kick (Drive: 11 plays, 77 yards, 5:47; Texas State 21–14)
- (3:40) RICE – Dean Connors 28 yard run, Tim Horn kick (Drive: 3 plays, 58 yards, 1:24; Tied 21–21)
- (0:00) TXST – Mason Shipley 31 yard field goal (Drive: 15 plays, 61 yards, 3:40; Texas State 24–21)

Third Quarter

- (9:57) TXST – Nash Jones 3 yard run, Mason Shipley kick (Drive: 10 plays, 30 yards, 5:03; Texas State 31–21)
- (8:16) TXST – Brian Holloway 48 yard interception return, Mason Shipley kick (Texas State 38–21)

Fourth Quarter

- (2:01) TXST – Jahmyl Jeter 1 yard run, Mason Shipley kick (Drive: 3 plays, 38 yards, 1:14; Texas State 45–21)

Statistics	TXST	RICE
First downs	15	18
Plays–yards	71–300	57–197
Rushes–yards	42–148	31–82
Passing yards	152	112
Passing: comp–att–int	15–29–0	13–26–5
Turnovers		
Time of possession	28:45	28:31

Team	Category	Player	Statistics
Texas State	Passing	T. J. Finley	15/29, 152 yards
Texas State	Rushing	Ismail Mahdi	24 carries, 122 yards
Texas State	Receiving	Ashtyn Hawkins	3 receptions, 55 yards
Rice	Passing	A. J. Padgett	10/21, 85 yards, TD, 3 INT
Rice	Rushing	Dean Connors	15 carries, 64 yards, 2 TD
Rice	Receiving	Elijah Mojarro	3 receptions, 35 yards
