= 2022 Incarnate Word Cardinals football team =

American college football season

2022 Incarnate Word Cardinals football

Southland co-champion

NCAA Division I Semifinal, L 32–35 vs. North Dakota State
- Conference: Southland Conference

Ranking
- STATS: No. 3
- FCS Coaches: No. 3
- Record: 12–2 (5–1 Southland)
- Head coach: G. J. Kinne (1st season)
- Offensive coordinator: Mack Leftwich (1st season)
- Offensive scheme: Run and gun
- Defensive coordinator: Jonathan Patke (1st season)
- Base defense: 4–2–5
- Home stadium: Gayle and Tom Benson Stadium

2022 Southland Conference football standings
	Conf.			Overall
Team	W		L	W		L
No. 12 Southeastern Louisiana +^	5	–	1	9	–	4
No. 3 Incarnate Word +^	5	–	1	12	–	2
Northwestern State	4	–	2	4	–	7
Nicholls	3	–	3	3	–	8
Texas A&M–Commerce *	3	–	3	5	–	6
McNeese	2	–	4	4	–	7
Houston Christian	1	–	5	2	–	9
Lamar	1	–	5	1	–	10
+ – Conference co-champions; ^ – FCS playoff participant; * – Texas A&M–Commerce ineligible for FCS postseason play due to transition from NCAA Division II; Rankings from STATS Poll

The 2022 Incarnate Word Cardinals football team represented the University of the Incarnate Word (UIW) as a member of the Southland Conference during the 2022 NCAA Division I FCS football season. The Cardinals played their home games at Gayle and Tom Benson Stadium in San Antonio, Texas. They were led by first-year head coach G. J. Kinne in his only season.

On June 24, 2022, Incarnate Word announced that they would remain in the Southland Conference days before they were to transition to the Western Athletic Conference (WAC). Previously in November 2021, the program announced the move of the athletics to the WAC for the 2022 season.

== Preseason ==
=== Preseason poll ===
The Southland Conference released their preseason poll on July 20, 2022. The Cardinals were picked to finish second in the conference and received seven first-place votes.

=== Preseason All–Southland Teams ===
The Southland Conference announced the 2022 preseason all-conference football team selections on July 13, 2022. UIW had a total of 16 players selected, the highest number in the Southland Conference.

Offense

1st Team

- Lindsey Scott Jr. – Quarterback, SR
- Taylor Grimes – Wide receiver, SR
- Nash Jones – Offensive lineman, JR

2nd Team

- Roger McCuller – Tight end/H-Back, RS-SR
- Darion Chafin – Wide receiver, RS-SR
- Reid Francis – Offensive lineman, SR
- Caleb Johnson – Offensive lineman, RS-SR
- Carson Mohr – Kicker, SR
- Keven Nguyen – Punter, RS-SR

Defense

1st Team

- Cameron Preston – Defensive lineman, RS-SR
- Kelechi Anyalebechi – Linebacker, RS-SR
- Kaleb Culp – Defensive back, JR

2nd Team

- Isaiah Paul – Linebacker, RS-JR
- Elliott Davison – Defensive back, JR
- Brandon Richard – Defensive back, SR
- Ce'Cori Tolds – Kick Returner, RS-SR

== Schedule ==
Date	Time	Opponent	Rank	Site	TV	Result	Attendance
September 3	6:00 p.m.	No. 9 Southern Illinois*	No. 14	Gayle and Tom Benson Stadium; San Antonio, TX	ESPN+	W 64–29	2,656
September 10	4:30 p.m.	at Nevada*	No. 8	Mackay Stadium; Reno, NV	KNSN-TV/BS SoCal	W 55–41	14,092
September 17	6:00 p.m.	at Prairie View A&M*	No. 6	Panther Stadium at Blackshear Field; Prairie View, TX	ESPN+	W 31–14	4,338
September 24	6:00 p.m.	at Southeastern Louisiana	No. T–4	Strawberry Stadium; Hammond, LA	ESPN+	L 35–41	5,095
October 1	6:00 p.m.	McNeese	No. 11	Gayle and Tom Benson Stadium; San Antonio, TX	ESPN+	W 48–20	2,542
October 8	4:00 p.m.	Lamar	No. 10	Gayle and Tom Benson Stadium; San Antonio, TX	ESPN3	W 56–17	1,937
October 15	3:00 p.m.	at Nicholls ‡*	No. T–8	Manning Field at John L. Guidry Stadium; Thibodaux, LA	ESPN+	W 49–14	5,122
October 22	2:05 p.m.	Faulkner*	No. 8	Gayle and Tom Benson Stadium; San Antonio, TX	ESPN+	W 70–0	2,598
October 29	2:00 p.m.	at Texas A&M–Commerce	No. 8	Ernest Hawkins Field at Memorial Stadium; Commerce, TX	ESPN+	W 35–7	4,127
November 5	2:00 p.m.	Houston Christian^{†}	No. 7	Gayle and Tom Benson Stadium; San Antonio, TX	ESPN+	W 73–20	3,249
November 19	1:00 p.m.	at Northwestern State	No. 5	Harry Turpin Stadium; Natchitoches, LA	ESPN+	W 66–7	3,142
December 3	1:00 p.m.	No. 11 Furman*	No. 5	Gayle and Tom Benson Stadium; San Antonio, TX (NCAA Division I Second Round)	ESPN+	W 41–38	2,373
December 9	9:30 p.m.	at No. 2 Sacramento State*	No. 5	Hornet Stadium; Sacramento, CA (NCAA Division I Quarterfinal)	ESPN+	W 66–63	13,722
December 16	6:00 p.m.	at No. 4 North Dakota State*	No. 5	Fargodome; Fargo, ND (NCAA Division I Semifinal)	ESPN2/ESPN+	L 32–35	12,569
*Non-conference game; ^{†}Homecoming; Rankings from STATS Poll released prior to the game; All times are in Central time

‡The game vs. Nicholls was previously scheduled as a non-conference game, and was retained as such, even though both schools are still in the Southland Conference.

== Personnel ==
=== Coaching staff ===
Name	Position	Alma mater	Joined staff
G. J. Kinne	Head coach	Tulsa (2011)	2022
Clint Killough	Associate head coach / wide receivers / recruiting coordinator	Incarnate Word (2015)	2018
Mack Leftwich	Offensive coordinator / quarterbacks	UTEP (2017)	2018
Jordan Shoemaker	Offensive Line / run game coordinator	Houston (2011)	2018
Jonathan Patke	Defensive coordinator / linebackers	Stephen F. Austin (2008)	2022
Will Bryant	Tight Ends & H-Backs / academic coordinator / High School Relations	Texas Tech (2014)	2022
Kam Martin	Running backs	Auburn (2019)	2022
David Stuckman	Cornerbacks	Grambling (2012)	2022
Dexter McCoil	Safeties / NFL & CFL liaison	Tulsa (2012)	2022
Matthew Gregg	Special teams coordinator / outside linebackers	Southern Nazarene (2014)	2019
Landon Keopple	Offensive quality control	Tulsa (2006)	2022
Kevon Beckwith	Run game coordinator / defensive line	Louisiana (2015)	2022
Zack Lucas	Director of football operations	Oklahoma State (2010)	2022
Blair Cavanaugh	Special teams analyst / the word coordinator	Portland State (2016)	2022
Reggie Marshall	Defensive quality control	Southeastern Oklahoma (2018)	2022
Bret Huth	Director of strength and conditioning	John Carroll (2010)	2018
Augie Melendez, Jr.	Head football athletic trainer	Texas A&M University–Corpus Christi (2017)	2017

=== Roster ===
2022 Incarnate Word Cardinals football
Quarterback: 1 Lindsey Scott Jr. (C) – (redshirt) senior (5'11, 212); 6 Steven Duncan – (redshirt) senior (6'6, 246); 7 Luke Gombert – junior (6'2, 186); 8 Kevin Yeager – senior (6'1, 195); 9 Kannon Williams – (redshirt) freshman (6'2, 220); Jalen Brown – (redshirt) sophomore (6'2, 225); Running back: 4 Isaiah Robinson – junior (6'2, 212); 5 Marcus Cooper – (redshirt) senior (5'8, 184); 8 Caleb Berry – sophomore (6'1, 225); 20 Brandon Zapata – senior (5'11, 199); 22 Jarrell Wiley – sophomore (5'10, 182); 24 Nick Meehan – sophomore (5'11, 193); 30 Dylan Nelson – freshman (5'10, 169); 38 Tyrese Brown – junior (5'11, 185); Wide receiver: 0 Darion Chafin – (redshirt) senior (6'3, 185); 2 CJ Hardy – senior (5'11, 200); 11 Ce'Cori Tolds – (redshirt) senior (5'10, 160); 13 Marquez Perez – (redshirt) junior (5'11, 191); 14 Emerson Haywood – junior (6'1, 163); 15 Jaelin Campbell – (redshirt) senior (6'1, 195); 16 Taylor Grimes – senior (5'11, 188); 17 DeKalon Taylor – freshman (5'9, 166); 18 Brandon Porter – (redshirt) senior (5'10, 165); 19 Baron Bradley – junior (6'1, 189); 21 Kole Wilson – freshman (5'9, 167); 81 Kailan Noseff – (redshirt) senior (6'3, 198); 82 Dayton Toney – (redshirt) sophomore (6'1, 188); 83 Jayden Jones – junior (6'2, 188); 84 Jalen Smothers – junior (5'10, 189); 89 Marcus Harmon – senior (5'10, 169); Tight end / Fullback: 3 Roger McCuller – ATH – (redshirt) senior (6'1, 214); 12 Seth Hayes – (redshirt) sophomore (6'4, 209); 34 Jeffrey Pearson – freshman (6'0, 205); 43 Mason Meyer – FB – senior (6'3, 265); 85 Christian Smith – sophomore (6'4, 215); 88 Jackson Lowe – (redshirt) junior (6'5, 237)	Offensive line: 51 Austin Yeager – freshman (6'6, 270); 55 Jimeto Obigbo – sophomore (6'4, 320); 57 Nick Sanchez – freshman (6'2, 310); 59 Jeremiah Richard – freshman (6'2, 213); 61 Aaron Martinez – junior (6'1, 295); 63 Stanley Mark – senior (6'3, 283); 64 Dorion Strawn – (redshirt) freshman (6'6, 317); 67 Emeka Obigbo – sophomore (6'5, 356); 68 Jhase Edwards – senior (6'3, 263); 70 Dayton Robinson – (redshirt) freshman (6'6, 320); 72 Reid Francis – senior (6'4, 306); 73 Caleb Flores –Freshman (6'4, 279); 74 Caleb Johnson – (redshirt) senior (6'6, 330); 75 Michael Vargas – junior (6'4, 309); 76 Nash Jones – junior (6'5, 312); 77 Jayden Borjas – senior (6'5, 228); 78 Austin DeArmond – freshman (6'4, 294); 79 Joseph Kimmey – senior (6'6, 302); Defensive line: 0 Olivier Charles–Pierre – DT – (redshirt) senior (6'1, 375); 6 Chris Whittaker – DE – (redshirt) senior (6'3, 230); 9 Zacchaeus McKinney – DE – (redshirt) senior (6'5, 252); 10 Mat Freeman – DE/LB – freshman (6'3, 230); 14 Steven Parker – DE – (redshirt) junior (6'4, 237); 27 DeVonte Wilson – DL – (redshirt) freshman (6'2, 196); 41 Darius Richmond – DT – senior (6'2, 270); 44 John Mathis – DT – (redshirt) sophomore (6'2, 265); 45 Jared Soyring – DT – (redshirt) senior (6'2, 281); 49 Edgerrin Williams – DE – junior (6'2, 250); 54 Jordan Bussey – DT – senior (6'0, 246); 90 Sam Latham – DE – senior (6'7, 260); 91 Lloyd Johnson – DT – freshman (6'2, 279); 93 Cameron Preston – DT – (redshirt) senior (6'1, 304); 94 Miles Adams – DE – (redshirt) junior (6'6, 243); 96 Josh Gonzalez – DT – (redshirt) freshman (6'3, 307); 99 Royce Wellington – DT – (redshirt) senior (6'1, 330); Punter: 10 Keven Nguyen – (redshirt) senior (5'10, 180); 48 Haden Tessier – K/P – freshman (5'9, 162); 49 Alec Schroeder – K/P – (redshirt) senior (6'0, 160)	Linebacker: 8 Kelechi Anyalebechi (C) – (redshirt) senior (6'0, 240); 21 Isaiah Paul – (injured) (redshirt) Junior (6'2, 232); 32 Darius Sanders – LB/S – sophomore (6'2, 199); 33 Tylan George – junior (5'10, 212); 34 Gerald Bowie III – (redshirt) senior (6'1, 247); 37 Kolton Scheppler – freshman (6'0, 237); 42 Tah Mac Bright – junior (6'2, 229); 46 Ricky Rich – (redshirt) sophomore (6'1, 212); 52 Greyson Calhoun – (redshirt) senior (6'2, 225); Defensive back: 1 Donte Thompson – CB – junior (5'11, 175); 2 Elliott Davison – S – junior (6'0, 179); 3 Micahh Smith – S – (redshirt) senior (6'0, 207); 4 Devan Barrett – CB – (redshirt) senior (6'0, 200); 5 Tiji Paul – CB – senior (5'10, 160); 7 Brandon Richard – S/LB – senior (5'11, 183); 12 Brian Mayes – CB – sophomore (6'1, 183); 13 Tre Richardson – S/LB – senior (6'2, 178); 16 Dante Heaggans – S – senior (6'1, 184); 18 Reese Watson – CB – senior (6'0, 185); 20 Kaleb Culp – S – junior (5'10, 186); 23 Shawn Holton – S – senior (5'10, 168); 25 Zamari Maxwell – CB – (redshirt) senior (6'1, 174); 26 Aaron Reynolds – S – (redshirt) senior (6'4, 201); 28 Jayden Staggers – CB – sophomore (5'11, 167); 29 Abdiel Richards – DB – (redshirt) senior (6'0, 189); 31 Preston Harris – DB/LB – freshman (6'0, 210); 36 Keenon Pitts – CB – junior (5'10, 169); 40 Khalil Warfield – S/LB – (redshirt) freshman (6'2, 193); Kicker: 50 Carson Mohr – senior (5'8, 146); 95 Tony Sterner – K/P – freshman (5'11, 161); 97 Luke Schabel – freshman (6'0, 187); Long snapper: 35 Chance Trentman–Rosas – senior (6'3, 212); 47 Elliot Desaloms – freshman (6'1, 206); 56 Joe Giordano – (redshirt) senior (5'11, 181); Legend: (C) Team captain; (S) Suspended; (I) Ineligible; Injured; Redshirt

== Depth chart ==
Defense

STAR
Brandon Richard
Tre Richardson
-or- Darius Sanders

FS
Elliott Davidson
Dante Heaggans
-or- Micahh Smith

W	M
Isaiah Paul	Kelechi Anyalebechi
Tah Mac Bright	Ricky Rich

RS
Kaleb Culp
Aaron Reynolds
-or- Shawn Holton

CB
Donte Thompson
Tiji Paul

DE	DT	DT	DE
Sam Latham -or- Zac McKinney	Cameron Preston	Olivier Charles-Pierre -or- Royce Wellington	Chris Whittaker -or- Steven Parker
Edgerrin Williams	Darius Richmond -or- John Mathis	Jared Soyring	Miles Adams

CB
Brian Mayes
Zamari Maxwell
-or- Devan Barrett

Offense

X
Taylor Grimes
Jaelin Campbell

Y
Brandon Porter
Kailan Noseff

LT	LG	C	RG	RT
Nash Jones	Caleb Johnson	Reid Francis	Stanley Mark	Jimeto Obigbo
Dorion Strawn	Jhase Edwards	Jayden Borjas	Emeka Obigbo	Dayton Robinson

3 Back
Roger McCuller
Jackson Lowe
-or- Mason Meyer

Z
Darion Chafin
Ce'Cori Tolds

QB
Lindsey Scott Jr.
Steven Duncan

Key reserves
CJ Hardy (WR)
Marquez Perez (WR)
Kole Wilson (WR)
DeKalon Taylor (WR/KR/PR)
Caleb Berry (RB)
Chance Trentman-Rosas (TE/LS/H)

RB
Marcus Cooper
Jarrell Wiley
-or- Isaiah Robinson
-or- Tyrese Brown

Special teams
PK Carson Mohr
PK Tony Sterner
P Keven Nguyen
P Toney Sterner
KR Ce'Cori Tolds
PR Ce'Cori Tolds
LS Joe Giordiano
H Keven Nguyen

== Postseason honors ==
The following Cardinals received postseason honors for the 2022 season:

Walter Payton Award
QB Lindsey Scott Jr. – Graduate Senior

Associated Press FCS All–America First Team
QB Lindsey Scott Jr. – Graduate Senior

Stats Perform FCS All–America First Team
QB Lindsey Scott Jr. – Graduate Senior

Stats Perform FCS All–America Second Team
WR Taylor Grimes – Senior
LB Kelechi Anyalebechi – Graduate Senior

Associated Press FCS All–America Third Team
WR Taylor Grimes – Senior
WR Darion Chafin – Graduate Senior
OL Caleb Johnson – Graduate Senior
LB Kelechi Anyalebechi – Graduate Senior

Stats Perform FCS All–America Third Team
WR Darion Chafin – Graduate Senior

Stats Perform FCS Freshman All–America Team
PR Kole Wilson – Freshman

Southland Conference Player of the Year
QB Lindsey Scott Jr. – Graduate Senior

Southland Conference Defensive Player of the Year
LB Kelechi Anyalebechi – Graduate Senior

All–Southland Conference First–Team
QB Lindsey Scott, Jr. – Graduate Senior
WR Taylor Grimes – Senior
WR Darion Chafin – Graduate Senior
OL Caleb Johnson – Graduate Senior
OL Reid Francis – Senior
DL Chris Whittaker – Graduate Senior
DL Steven Parker – Senior
LB Kelechi Anyalebechi – Graduate Senior
DB Donte Thompson – Junior

All–Southland Conference Second–Team
RB Marcus Cooper – Graduate Senior
OL Jimeto Obigbo – Sophomore
OL Nash Jones – Junior
DB Kaleb Culp – Junior

== Game summaries ==
=== No. 9 Southern Illinois ===
Uniform combination
Helmet	Jersey	Pants

Southern Illinois Salukis at Incarnate Word Cardinals

Quarter	1	2	3	4	Total
No. 9 Salukis	0	16	3	10	29
No. 14 Cardinals	22	7	14	21	64

at Gayle and Tom Benson Stadium, San Antonio, TX

- Date: September 3
- Game time: 6:00 p.m. (Delayed by lightning until 7:40 p.m.)
- Game weather: Temperature: 74 • Wind: SE 6 mph • Weather: Overcast
- Game attendance: 2,656
- Referee: James Brookhart
- TV announcers (ESPN+): Paul Alexander (play-by-play), Karl Schoening (analyst) and Katie Goodman (sideline)
- Box Score

Game information

First Quarter

- UIW – 13:42 Taylor Grimes 66 yard pass from Lindsey Scott Jr., Carson Mohr kick
  UIW 7–0 Drive: 5 plays, 75 yards, 1:18
- UIW – 12:21 Team 20 yard safety
  UIW 9–0
- UIW – 7:26 Taylor Grimes 55 yard pass from Lindsey Scott Jr., Carson Mohr kick
  UIW 16–0 Drive: 1 play, 55 yards, 0:09
- UIW – 0:43 Lindsey Scott Jr. 6 yard run, Carson Mohr kick failed
  UIW 22–0 Drive: 5 plays, 20 yards, 1:31

Second Quarter

- SIU – 9:16 Romeir Elliott 55 yard run, Jake Baumgarte kick
  UIW 22–7 Drive: 5 plays, 77 yards, 2:18
- UIW – 8:11 Darion Chafin 79 yard pass from Lindsey Scott Jr., Carson Mohr kick
  UIW 29–7 Drive: 3 plays, 81 yards, 0:57
- SIU – 4:41 Justin Strong 6 yard run, Jake Baumgarte kick failed
  UIW 29–13 Drive: 9 plays, 73 yards, 3:24
- SIU – 0:00 Jake Baumgarte 47 yard field goal
  UIW 29–16 Drive: 11 plays, 41 yards, 3:14

Third Quarter

- SIU – 5:52 Jake Baumgarte 32 yard field goal
  UIW 29–19 Drive: 19 plays, 69 yards, 9:01
- UIW – 3:29 Marquez Perez 36 yard pass from Lindsey Scott Jr., Carson Mohr kick
  UIW 36–19 Drive: 9 plays, 75 yards, 2:23
- UIW – 2:13 Tiji Paul 38 yard interception return, Carson Mohr kick
  UIW 43–19

Fourth Quarter

- UIW – 12:52 Jaelin Campbell 39 yard pass from Lindsey Scott Jr., Carson Mohr kick
  UIW 50–19 Drive: 6 plays, 75 yards, 2:29
- SIU – 8:27 Jake Baumgarte 26 yard field goal
  UIW 50–22 Drive: 10 plays, 48 yards, 4:14
- UIW – 5:29 Brandon Porter 38 yard pass from Lindsey Scott Jr., Carson Mohr kick
  UIW 57–22 Drive: 6 plays, 75 yards, 2:58
- SIU – 3:36 Dayton Mitchell 6 yard pass from Zach Zebrowski, Jake Baumgarte kick
  UIW 57–29 Drive: 6 plays, 75 yards, 1:53
- UIW – 1:02 Caleb Berry 3 yard run, Carson Mohr kick
  UIW 64–29 Drive: 6 plays, 75 yards, 2:34

Passing

- SIU – Nic Baker 19/31, 175 YDS, 1 INT
- UIW – Lindsey Scott Jr. 17/25, 391 YDS, 6 TD

Rushing

- SIU – Romeir Elliott 15 ATT, 103 YDS, 1 TD
- UIW – Jarrell Wiley 3 ATT, 35 YDS

Receiving

- SIU – Avante Cox 6 REC, 57 YDS
- UIW – Taylor Grimes 3 REC, 126 YDS, 2 TD

=== @ Nevada ===
Uniform combination
Helmet	Jersey	Pants

Incarnate Word Cardinals at Nevada Wolf Pack

Quarter	1	2	3	4	Total
No. 8 Cardinals	9	15	14	17	55
Wolf Pack	17	0	14	10	41

at Mackay Stadium, Reno, NV

- Date: September 10
- Game time: 4:30 p.m.
- Game weather: Temperature: 87 • Wind: SE 2 mph • Weather: Cloudy
- Game attendance: 14,092
- Referee: Christian Watson
- TV announcers (KNSN-TV/Bally Sports SoCal): Alex Margulies (play-by-play), Lucas Weber (analyst) and Shannon Kelly (sideline)
- Box Score

Game information

First Quarter

- NEV – 11:51 Brandon Talton 34 yard field goal
  NEV 3–0 Drive: 7 plays, 15 yards, 2:41
- NEV – 10:38 Toa Taua 11 yard run, Brandon Talton kick
  NEV 10–0 Drive: 3 plays, 33 yards, 1:09
- UIW – 5:57 Carson Mohr 38 yard field goal
  NEV 10–3 Drive: 7 plays, 21 yards, 1:56
- NEV – 1:45 BJ Casteel 7 yard pass from Nate Cox, Brandon Talton kick
  NEV 17–3 Drive: 12 plays, 75 yards, 4:12
- UIW – 0:30 Marcus Cooper 21 yard run, Carson Mohr kick blocked
  NEV 17–9 Drive: 4 plays, 75 yards, 1:15

Second Quarter

- UIW – 9:07 Roger McCuller 1 yard pass from Lindsey Scott Jr., Carson Mohr kick
  NEV 17–16 Drive: 4 plays, 82 yards, 1:13
- UIW – 3:28 Jarrell Wiley 18 yard run, Lindsey Scott Jr. rush
  UIW 24–17 Drive: 7 plays, 65 yards, 1:50

Third Quarter

- UIW – 12:05 Kelechi Anyalebechi 59 yard fumble recovery, Carson Mohr kick
  UIW 31–17
- UIW – 9:24 Darion Chafin 44 yard pass from Lindsey Scott Jr., Carson Mohr kick
  UIW 38–17 Drive: 7 plays, 56 yards, 1:32
- NEV – 5:55 Nate Cox 3 yard run, Brandon Talton kick
  UIW 38–24 Drive: 10 plays, 75 yards, 3:29
- NEV – 0:19 Toa Taua 26 yard pass from Nate Cox, Brandon Talton kick
  UIW 38–31 Drive: 5 plays, 75 yards, 1:18

Fourth Quarter

- UIW – 13:05 Carson Mohr 30 yard field goal
  UIW 41–31 Drive: 8 plays, 71 yards, 2:09
- NEV – 10:33 Brandon Talton 40 yard field goal
  UIW 41–34 Drive: 7 plays, 53 yards, 2:32
- UIW – 8:19 Marcus Cooper 10 yard pass from Lindsey Scott, Jr., Carson Mohr kick
  UIW 48–34 Drive: 6 plays, 75 yards, 2:14
- NEV – 2:13 Devonte Lee 6 yard run, Brandon Talton kick
  UIW 48–41 Drive: 6 plays, 75 yards, 2:01
- UIW – 1:10 Darion Chafin 41 yard pass from Lindsey Scott Jr., Carson Mohr kick
  UIW 55–41 Drive: 3 plays, 42 yards, 0:59

Passing

- UIW – Lindsey Scott Jr. 18/25, 406 YDS, 4 TD, 1 INT
- NEV – Nate Cox 22/43, 302 YDS, 2 TD

Rushing

- UIW – Marcus Cooper 16 ATT, 84 YDS, 1 TD
- NEV – Toa Taua 24 ATT, 101 YDS, 1 TD

Receiving

- UIW – Darion Chafin 7 REC, 262 YDS, 2 TD
- NEV – BJ Casteel 5 REC, 85 YDS, 1 TD

=== @ Prairie View A&M ===
Uniform combination
Helmet	Jersey	Pants

Incarnate Word Cardinals at Prairie View A&M Panthers

Quarter	1	2	3	4	Total
No. 6 Cardinals	14	6	11	0	31
Panthers	7	0	0	7	14

at Panther Stadium at Blackshear Field, Prairie View, TX

- Date: September 17
- Game time: 6:00 p.m.
- Game weather: Temperature: 88 • Weather: Sunny
- Game attendance: 4,338
- Referee: Brandon Bullock
- TV announcers (ESPN+): Butch Alsandor (play-by-play) and Jorge Vargas (analyst)
- Box Score

Game information

First Quarter

- UIW – 10:01 Darion Chafin 6 yard pass from Lindsey Scott Jr., Carson Mohr kick blocked
  UIW 6–0 Drive: 7 plays, 70 yards, 2:35
- PVAMU – 6:27 Ahmad Antoine 2 yard run, Luis Reyes kick
  PVAMU 7–6 Drive: 6 plays, 66 yards, 3:25
- UIW – 3:23 Taylor Grimes 6 yard pass from Lindsey Scott Jr., Brandon Porter pass from Lindsey Scott, Jr.
  UIW 14–7 Drive: 9 plays, 64 yards, 2:54

Second Quarter

- UIW – 14:15 Marquez Perez 18 yard pass from Lindsey Scott Jr., Tony Sterner kick missed
  UIW 20–7 Drive: 7 plays, 53 yards, 2:22

Third Quarter

- UIW – 10:48 Isaiah Robinson 4 yard run, Taylor Grimes pass from Lindsey Scott Jr.
  UIW 28–7 Drive: 12 plays, 75 yards, 4:05
- UIW – 0:00 Tony Sterner 35 yard field goal
  UIW 31–7 Drive: 14 plays, 66 yards, 5:54

Fourth Quarter

- PVAMU – 6:48 Ahmad Antoine 1 yard run, Luis Reyes kick
  UIW 31–14 Drive: 8 plays, 75 yards, 3:35

Passing

- UIW – Lindsey Scott Jr. 30/41, 228 YDS, 3 TD
- PVAMU – Channing Dumas 2/13, 37 YDS

Rushing

- UIW – Jarrell Wiley 16 ATT, 92 YDS
- PVAMU – Ahmad Antoine 14 ATT, 86 YDS, 2 TD

Receiving

- UIW – Taylor Grimes 7 REC, 40 YDS, 1 TD
- PVAMU – Dylan Domel 1 REC, 27 YDS

=== @ Southeastern Louisiana ===
Uniform combination
Helmet	Jersey	Pants

Incarnate Word Cardinals at Southeastern Louisiana Lions

Quarter	1	2	3	4	Total
No. 4T Cardinals	7	14	7	7	35
Lions	7	14	3	17	41

at Strawberry Stadium, Hammond, LA

- Date: September 24
- Game time: 6:00 p.m.
- Game weather: Sunny
- Game attendance: 5,095
- Referee: Ed Bourgeois
- TV announcers (ESPN3): Chase Gispert (play-by-play), Lonn Ellzey (analyst) and Mackenzie Fletcher (sideline)
- Box Score

Game information

First Quarter

- SLU – 7:33 Ivan Drobocky 9 Yd pass from Cephus Johnson III, Riley Callaghan kick
  SLU 7–0 Drive: 5 plays, 33 yards, 2:37
- UIW – 0:17 Lindsey Scott Jr. 6 Yd Run, Carson Mohr kick
  Tied 7–7 Drive: 11 plays, 60 yards, 2:53

Second Quarter

- SLU – 11:17 Carlos Washington Jr. 2 Yd Run, Riley Callaghan kick
  SLU 14–7 Drive: 9 plays, 54 yards, 3:54
- UIW – 9:01 Marcus Cooper 4 Yd Run, Carson Mohr kick
  Tied 14–14 Drive: 6 plays, 82 yards, 2:11
- SLU – 6:53 Carlos Washington Jr. 5 Yd Run, Riley Callaghan kick
  SLU 21–14 Drive: 6 plays, 60 yards, 2:01
- UIW – 4:21 CJ Hardy 18 Yd pass from Lindsey Scott Jr., Carson Mohr kick
  Tied 21–21 Drive: 7 plays, 75 yards, 2:32

Third Quarter

- SLU – 8:49 Riley Callaghan 29 Yd Field Goal
  SLU 24–21 Drive: 12 plays, 64 yards, 6:11
- UIW – 2:45 Darion Chafin 5 Yd pass from Lindsey Scott Jr., Carson Mohr kick
  UIW 28–24 Drive: 13 plays, 79 yards, 5:56

Fourth Quarter

- SLU – 12:24 Riley Callaghan 23 Yd Field Goal
  UIW 28–27 Drive: 11 plays, 75 yards, 5:13
- SLU – 6:14 CJ Turner 15 Yd pass from Eli Sawyer, Jessie Britt pass from Eli Sawyer
  SLU 35–28 Drive: 7 plays, 46 yards, 3:17
- UIW – 0:21 Marquez Perez 4 Yd pass from Lindsey Scott Jr., Carson Mohr kick
  Tied 35–35 Drive: 9 plays, 55 yards, 3:04
- SLU – 0:00 CJ Turner 59 Yd pass from Eli Sawyer
  SLU 41–35 Drive: 3 plays, 81 yards, 0:16

Passing

- UIW – Lindsey Scott Jr. 27/38, 333 YDS, 3 TD, 1 INT
- SLU – Eli Sawyer 15/24, 256 YDS, 2 TD

Rushing

- UIW – Marcus Cooper 16 ATT, 61 YDS, 1 TD7
- SLU – Carlos Washington 23 CAR, 120 YDS, 2 TD

Receiving

- UIW – Marcus Cooper 6 REC, 94 YDS
- SLU – CJ Turner 5 REC, 139 YDS, 2 TD

=== McNeese ===
Uniform combination
Helmet	Jersey	Pants

McNeese Cowboys at Incarnate Word Cardinals

Quarter	1	2	3	4	Total
Cowboys	0	10	3	7	20
No. 11 Cardinals	14	7	7	20	48

at Gayle and Tom Benson Stadium, San Antonio, TX

- Date: October 1
- Game time: 6:05 p.m.
- Game weather: Temperature: 88 • Wind: E 8 mph • Weather: Clear
- Game attendance: 2,542
- Referee: Craig Helser
- TV announcers (ESPN+): Paul Alexander (play-by-play), Karl Schoening (analyst) and Sam Kaman (sideline)
- Box Score

Game information

First Quarter

- UIW – 12:10 Lindsey Scott Jr. 7 yard run, Carson Mohr kick
  UIW 7–0 Drive: 8 plays, 75 yards, 2:50
- UIW – 0:44 Lindsey Scott, Jr. 7 yard run, Carson Mohr kick
  UIW 14–0 Drive: 6 plays, 19 yards, 3:05

Second Quarter

- McN – 10:04 Garrison Smith 39 yard field goal
  UIW 14–3 Drive: 13 plays, 53 yards, 5:40
- McN – 2:12 Deonta McMahon 3 yard run, Garrison Smith kick
  UIW 14–10 Drive: 10 plays, 42 yards, 4:52
- UIW – 0:04 Taylor Grimes 11 yard pass from Lindsey Scott Jr., Carson Mohr kick
  UIW 21–10 Drive: 8 plays, 62 yards, 2:00

Third Quarter

- McN – 10:58 Garrison Smith 47 yard field goal
  UIW 21–13 Drive: 10 plays, 45 yards, 4:02
- UIW – 3:40 Taylor Grimes 33 yard pass from Lindsey Scott Jr., Carson Mohr kick
  UIW 28–13 Drive: 8 plays, 81 yards, 2:31

Fourth Quarter

- McN – 12:13 Josh Parker 1 yard run, Garrison Smith kick
  UIW 28–20 Drive: 12 plays, 56 yards, 6:17
- UIW – 8:20 Lindsey Scott, Jr. 5 yard run, Kevin Nguyen run failed
  UIW 34–20 Drive: 12 plays, 74 yards, 3:45
- UIW – 2:22 CJ Hardy 23 yard pass from Lindsey Scott, Jr., Carson Mohr kick
  UIW 41–20 Drive: 10 plays, 61 yards, 3:08
- UIW – 0:40 Taylor Grimes 6 yard pass from Lindsey Scott, Jr., Carson Mohr kick
  UIW 48–20 Drive: 3 plays, 32 yards, 1:03

Passing

- McN – Knox Kadum 13/26, 144 YDS
- UIW – Lindsey Scott Jr. 25/35, 347 YDS, 4 TD

Rushing

- McN – Deonta McMahon 17 ATT, 88 YDS, 1 TD
- UIW – Marcus Cooper 25 ATT, 135 YDS

Receiving

- McN – Mason Pierce 5 REC, 60 YDS
- UIW – Taylor Grimes 8 REC, 115 YDS, 3 TD

=== Lamar ===
Uniform combination
Helmet	Jersey	Pants

Lamar Cardinals at Incarnate Word Cardinals

Quarter	1	2	3	4	Total
Cardinals (LU)	0	10	0	7	17
No. 10 Cardinals (UIW)	35	21	0	0	56

at Gayle and Tom Benson Stadium, San Antonio, TX

- Date: October 8
- Game time: 4:00 p.m.
- Game weather: Temperature: 89 • Wind: ENE 9 mph • Weather: Partly Cloudy
- Game attendance: 1,937
- Referee: Nolan Dumas
- TV announcers (ESPN3): Paul Alexander (play-by-play), Karl Schoening (analyst) and Katie Goodman (sideline)
- Box Score

Game information

First Quarter

- UIW – 12:58 Taylor Grimes 21 yard pass from Lindsey Scott Jr., Carson Mohr kick
  UIW 7–0 Drive 7 plays, 75 yards, 2:02
- UIW – 9:03 Marcus Cooper 16 yard run, Carson Mohr kick
  UIW 14–0 Drive 7 plays, 70 yards, 2:34
- UIW – 7:48 Roger McCuller 14 yard pass from Lindsey Scott, Jr., Carson Mohr kick
  UIW 21–0 Drive 3 plays, 31 yards, 1:04
- UIW – 5:33 Jaelin Campbell 83 yard pass from Lindsey Scott, Jr. Carson Mohr kick
  UIW 28–0 Drive 3 plays, 98 yards, 0:37
- UIW – 1:06 Brandon Porter 6 yard pass from Lindsey Scott, Jr. Carson Mohr kick
  UIW 35–0 Drive 7 plays, 70 yards, 2:51

Second Quarter

- LU – 8:09 Chris Esqueda 31 yard field goal
  UIW 35–3 Drive 16 plays, 78 yards, 7:49
- UIW – 7:25 Brandon Porter 5 yard pass from Lindsey Scott, Jr., Carson Mohr kick
  UIW 42–3 Drive 3 plays, 80 yards, 0:36
- UIW – 4:22 Darion Chafin 19 yard pass from Lindsey Scott, Jr., Carson Mohr kick
  UIW 49–3 Drive 3 plays, 31 yards, 1:04
- LU – 1:58 Jalen Dummett 7 yard run, Chris Esqueda kick
  UIW 49–10 Drive 5 plays, 75 yards, 2:24
- UIW – 0:54 Taylor Grimes 14 yard pass from Lindsey Scott, Jr., Carson Mohr kick
  UIW 56–10 Drive 8 plays, 73 yards, 0:57

Fourth Quarter

- LU – 9:40 R.J. Carver 1 yard run, Chris Esqueda kick
  UIW 56–17 Drive 9 plays, 59 yards, 3:41

Passing

- LU – Mike Chandler 14/28, 182 YDS, 1 INT
- UIW – Lindsey Scott Jr. 23/26, 401 YDS, 7 TD

Rushing

- LU – R.J. Carver 9 ATT, 52 YDS, 1 TD
- UIW – Isaiah Robinson 11 ATT, 63 YDS

Receiving

- LU – Andre Dennis 1 REC, 66 YDS
- UIW – Darion Chafin 4 REC, 115 YDS, 1 TD

=== @ Nicholls ===
Uniform combination
Helmet	Jersey	Pants

Incarnate Word Cardinals at Nicholls Colonels

Quarter	1	2	3	4	Total
No. 8т Cardinals	14	7	21	7	49
Colonels	0	7	0	7	14

at Manning Field at John L. Guidry Stadium, Thibodaux, LA

- Date: October 15
- Game time: 3:00 p.m.
- Game weather: Sunny
- Game attendance: 5,122
- Referee: Gary Leeper
- TV announcers (ESPN+): Jack Benjamin (play-by-play) and Ronnie Rantz (analyst)
- Box Score

Game information

First Quarter

- UIW – 8:15 CJ Hardy 30 yard pass from Lindsey Scott Jr., Carson Mohr kick
  UIW 7–0 Drive: 7 plays, 80 yards, 1:46
- UIW – 4:47 Taylor Grimes 4 yard pass from Lindsey Scott, Jr., Carson Mohr kick
  UIW 14–0 Drive 7 plays 50 yards 2:30

Second Quarter

- UIW – 13:30 Marcus Cooper 7 yard pass from Lindsey Scott, Jr., Carson Mohr kick
  UIW 21–0 Drive 13 plays, 79 yards, 4:58
- NSU – 6:16 Lee Negrotto 17 yard pass from Kohen Granier, Gavin Lasseigne kick
  UIW 21–7 Drive 8 plays, 63 yards, 3:43

Third Quarter

- UIW – 12:19 Marcus Cooper 14 yard run, Carson Mohr kick
  UIW 28–7 Drive 9 plays, 81 yards, 2:36
- UIW – 6:41 Taylor Grimes 20 yard pass from Lindsey Scott, Jr., Carson Mohr kick
  UIW 35–7 Drive 10 plays, 80 yards, 4:02
- UIW – 1:48 Darion Chafin 15 yard pass from Lindsey Scott, Jr., Carson Mohr kick
  UIW 42–7 Drive 10 plays 85 yards 3:13

Fourth Quarter

- NSU – 14:04 Leonard Kelly 1 yard run, Gavin Lasseigne kick
  UIW 42–14 Drive 9 plays, 63 yards, 2:44
- UIW – 9:41 Jaelin Campbell 14 yard pass from Steven Duncan, Carson Mohr kick
  UIW 49–14 Drive 10 plays, 75 yards, 4:23

Passing

- UIW – Lindsey Scott Jr. 27/36, 327 YDS, 5 TD
- NSU – Leonard Kelly 12/26, 114 YDS, 2 INT

Rushing

- UIW – Marcus Cooper 20 ATT, 137 YDS, 1 TD
- NSU – Collin Guggenheim 9 ATT, 78 YDS

Receiving

- UIW – Taylor Grimes 10 REC, 125 YDS, 2 TD
- NSU – Lee Negrotto 3 REC, 46 YDS, 1 TD

=== Faulkner ===
Uniform combination
Helmet	Jersey	Pants

Faulkner Eagles at Incarnate Word Cardinals

Quarter	1	2	3	4	Total
Eagles	0	0	0	0	0
No. 8 Cardinals	35	21	7	7	70

at Gayle and Tom Benson Stadium, San Antonio, TX

- Date: October 22
- Game time: 2:00 p.m.
- Game weather: Temperature: 86 • Wind: S 16 mph • Weather: Partly Cloudy, Windy
- Game attendance: 2,598
- Referee: James Brookhart
- TV announcers (ESPN+): Paul Alexander (play-by-play), Karl Schoening (analyst) and Katie Goodman (sideline)
- Box Score

Game information

First Quarter

- UIW – 10:54 Darion Chafin 64 yard pass from Lindsey Scott Jr., Carson Mohr kick
  UIW 7–0 Drive: 5 plays, 82 yards, 1:50
- UIW – 7:14 Jaelin Campbell 9 yard pass from Lindsey Scott, Jr., Carson Mohr kick
  UIW 14–0 Drive: 7 plays, 68 yards, 1:46
- UIW – 5:17 Kole Wilson 48 yard punt return, Carson Mohr kick
  UIW 21–0
- UIW – 1:19 Taylor Grimes 70 yard pass from Lindsey Scott, Jr., Carson Mohr kick
  UIW 28–0 Drive: 1 play, 70 yards, 0:10
- UIW – 0:17 CJ Hardy 42 yard pass from Lindsey Scott, Jr., Carson Mohr kick
  UIW 35–0 Drive: 1 play, 42 yards, 0:08

Second Quarter

- UIW – 12:45 CJ Hardy 19 yard pass from Lindsey Scott, Jr., Carson Mohr kick
  UIW 42–0 Drive: 5 plays, 80 yards, 1:27
- UIW – 6:18 Steven Duncan 7 yard run, Carson Mohr kick
  UIW 49–0 Drive: 11 plays, 82 yards, 3:44
- UIW – 4:48 Kole Wilson 48 yard punt return, Carson Mohr kick
  UIW 56–0

UIW single-game, season, and career record for punt return TDs.

Third Quarter

(12:00 by mutual agreement)

- UIW – 10:58 Steven Duncan 8 yard run, Carson Mohr kick
  UIW 63–0 Drive: 3 plays, 65 yards, 1:02

Fourth Quarter

(10:00 by mutual agreement)

- UIW – 0:13 Jalen Smothers 24 yard pass from Luke Gombert, Carson Mohr kick
  UIW 70–0 Drive: 5 plays 45 yards 1:50

Passing

- FU – Ben Anderson 11/18, 104 YDS
- UIW – Lindsey Scott Jr. 12/14, 302 YDS, 5 TD

Rushing

- FU – Drexlan Allen 6 ATT, 27 YDS
- UIW – Marcus Cooper 4 ATT, 48 YDS

Receiving

- FU – Jaiveyon Tucker 3 REC, 40 YDS
- UIW – Taylor Grimes 4 REC, 133 YDS, 1 TD

=== @ Texas A&M–Commerce ===
Uniform combination
Helmet	Jersey	Pants

Incarnate Word Cardinals at Texas A&M–Commerce Lions

Quarter	1	2	3	4	Total
No. 8 Cardinals	0	14	7	14	35
Lions	0	7	0	0	7

at Ernest Hawkins Field at Memorial Stadium, Commerce, TX

- Date: October 29
- Game time: 2:02 p.m.
- Game weather: Temperature: 64 • Wind: NW 12 mph • Weather: Cloudy
- Game attendance: 4,127
- Referee: Nolan Dumas
- TV announcers (ESPN+): John Hendrie (play-by-play) and Drew Ivory (analyst)
- Box Score

Game information

Second Quarter

- UIW – 9:30 Lindsey Scott Jr. 24 yard run, Carson Mohr kick
  UIW 7–0 Drive: 8 plays, 99 yards, 3:03
- TAMUC – 4:09 Cameron Nellor 4 yard run, Emmanuel Adagbon kick
  Tied 7–7 Drive: 10 plays, 65 yards, 5:21
- UIW – 1:10 Marcus Cooper 5 yard run, Carson Mohr kick
  UIW 14–7 Drive: 10 plays, 77 yards, 2:54

Third Quarter

- UIW – 12:57 Brandon Porter 34 yard pass from Lindsey Scott, Jr., Carson Mohr kick
  UIW 21–7 Drive: 7 plays, 72 yards, 1:59

Fourth Quarter

- UIW – 14:30 Marcus Cooper 4 yard run, Carson Mohr kick
  UIW 28–7 Drive: 8 plays, 78 yards, 3:00
- UIW – 2:36 Marcus Cooper 3 yard run, Carson Mohr kick
  UIW 35–7 Drive: 11 plays, 52 yards, 5:52

Passing

- UIW – Lindsey Scott Jr. 19/29, 282 YDS, 1 TD, 2 INT
- TAMUC – Eric Rodriguez 16/27, 162 YDS, 2 INT

Rushing

- UIW – Marcus Cooper 22 ATT, 183 YDS, 3 TD
- TAMUC – Spencer Long 14 ATT, 38 YDS

Receiving

- UIW – Brandon Porter 7 REC, 127 YDS, 1 TD
- TAMUC – Andrew Armstrong 6 REC, 42 YDS

=== Houston Christian ===
Uniform combination
Helmet	Jersey	Pants

Houston Christian Huskies at Incarnate Word Cardinals

Quarter	1	2	3	4	Total
Huskies	3	3	14	0	20
No. 7 Cardinals	21	49	3	0	73

at Gayle and Tom Benson Stadium, San Antonio, TX

- Date: November 5
- Game time: 2:05 p.m.
- Game weather: Temperature: 75 • Wind: SSE 6 mph • Weather: Sunny and Clear
- Game attendance: 3,249
- Referee: James Brookhart
- TV announcers (ESPN+): Paul Alexander (play-by-play), Karl Schoening (analyst) and Katie Goodman (sideline)
- Box Score

Game information

First Quarter

- HCU – 11:29 Nery Enriquez 32 yard field goal
  HCU 3–0 Drive: 11 plays, 56 yards, 3:26
- UIW – 7:50 Brandon Porter 19 yard pass from Lindsey Scott Jr., Carson Mohr kick
  UIW 7–3 Drive 5 plays, 38 yards, 1:22
- UIW – 7:34 Kelechi Anyalebechi 22 yard interception return, Carson Mohr kick
  UIW 14–3
- UIW – 2:35 Brandon Porter 41 yard pass from Lindsey Scott, Jr., Carson Mohr kick
  UIW 21–3 Drive: 4 plays, 81 yards, 0:57

Second Quarter

- HCU – 14:22 Nery Enriquez 31 yard field goal
  UIW 21–6 Drive: 10 plays, 61 yards, 3:13
- UIW – 12:38 Marcus Cooper fumble recovery in the end zone, Carson Mohr kick
  UIW 28–6 Drive: 5 plays, 67 yards, 1:38
- UIW – 11:58 Darion Chafin 10 yard pass from Lindsey Scott, Jr., Carson Mohr kick
  UIW 35–6 Drive: 3 plays, 10 yards, 0:15
- UIW – 9:28 CJ Hardy 13 yard pass from Lindsey Scott, Jr., Carson Mohr kick
  UIW 42–6 Drive: 3 plays, 58 yards, 0:37
- UIW – 8:13 Chance Trentman-Rosas 3 yard blocked punt return, Carson Mohr kick
  UIW 49–6
- UIW – 6:10 Darion Chafin 34 yard pass from Lindsey Scott, Jr., Carson Mohr kick
  UIW 56–6 Drive: 5 plays, 45 yards, 1:34
- UIW – 5:46 Taylor Grimes 39 yard pass from Lindsey Scott, Jr., Carson Mohr kick
  UIW 56–6 Drive: 1 play, 39 yard, 0:07
- UIW – 1:59 Jaelin Campbell 63 yard pass from Lindsey Scott, Jr., Carson Mohr kick
  UIW 70–6 Drive 5 plays, 78 yards, 1:50

Third Quarter

- UIW - 11:14 Carson Mohr 35 yard field goal
  UIW 73–6 Drive 7 plays, 39 yards, 3:41
- HCU – 7:03 Nat Livingston 7 yard fun, Nery Enriquez kick
  UIW 73–13 Drive 11 plays, 77 yards, 4:04
- HCU – 2:38 Fudge Woods 28 yard pass from Justin Fomby, Nery Enriquez kick
  UIW 73–20 Drive: 5 plays, 50 yards, 2:25

Statistics	HCU	UIW
First downs	22	21
Plays–yards	82–365	65–520
Rushes–yards	35–90	38–147
Passing yards	275	373
Passing: comp–att–int	28–47–3	19–27–0
Turnovers		
Time of possession	33:45	26:15

Team	Category	Player	Statistics
Houston Christian	Passing	Justin Fomby	27/45, 267 yards, 1 TD, 3 INT
Houston Christian	Rushing	Ismail Mahdi	13 carries, 87 yards
Houston Christian	Receiving	Deon Cormier	8 receptions, 65 yards
Incarnate Word	Passing	Lindsey Scott Jr.	15/20, 319 yards, 7 TD
Incarnate Word	Rushing	Marcus Cooper	13 carries, 79 yards, 1 TD
Incarnate Word	Receiving	Jaelin Campbell	3 receptions, 78 yards, 1 TD

=== @ Northwestern State ===
Uniform combination
Helmet	Jersey	Pants

Incarnate Word Cardinals at Northwestern State Demons

Quarter	1	2	3	4	Total
No. 5 Cardinals	14	17	21	14	66
Demons	7	0	0	0	7

at Harry Turpin Stadium, Natchitoches, LA

- Date: November 19
- Game time: 1:05 p.m.
- Game weather: Temperature: 47 • Wind: S 5 mph • Weather: Cloudy
- Game attendance: 3,142
- Referee: Gary Leeper
- TV announcers (ESPN+): Patrick Netherton (play-by-play), Gary Reasons (analyst), and Tyler Moody (sideline)
- Box Score

Game information

First Quarter

- NSU – 9:59 LC Greenwood 1 yard pass from Zachary Clement, Eddie Godina kick
  NSU 7–0 Drive 12 plays, 75 yards, 5:01
- UIW – 6:19 Darion Chafin 10 yard pass from Lindsey Scott Jr., Carson Mohr kick
  Tied 7–7 Drive 10 plays, 66 yards, 3:34
- UIW – 0:11 Taylor Grimes 16 yard pass from Lindsey Scott, Jr., Carson Mohr kick
  UIW 14–7 Drive 8 plays, 80 yards, 2:42

Second Quarter

- UIW – 8:40 Lindsey Scott, Jr. 18 yard run, Carson Mohr kick
  UIW 21–7 Drive 6 plays, 45 yards, 1:17
- UIW – 4:24 Jaelin Campbell 4 yard pass from Lindsey Scott, Jr., Carson Mohr kick
  UIW 28–7 Drive 6 plays, 65 yards, 1:40
- UIW – 0:00 Carson Mohr 31 yard field goal
  UIW 31–7 Drive 3 plays, 44 yards, 0:18

Third Quarter

- UIW – 14:18 Darion Chafin 51 yard pass from Lindsey Scott, Jr., Carson Mohr kick
  UIW 38–7 Drive 3 plays, 63 yards, 0:37
- UIW – 7:07 Marcus Cooper 67 yard run, Carson Mohr kick
  UIW 45–7 Drive 2 plays, 90 yards, 0:41
- UIW – 2:46 Darion Chafin 48 yard pass from Lindsey Scott, Jr., Carson Mohr kick
  UIW 52–7 Drive 5 plays, 71 yards, 1:11

Fourth Quarter

- UIW – 14:46 Marcus Cooper 78 yard run, Carson Mohr kick
  UIW 59–7 Drive 2 plays, 79 yards, 0:21
- UIW – 8:04 Jarrell Wiley 39 yard run, Carson Mohr kick
  UIW 66–7 Drive 5 plays, 74 yards, 1:30

Statistics	UIW	NSU
First downs	30	20
Plays–yards	72–786	92–338
Rushes–yards	34–373	39–99
Passing yards	413	239
Passing: comp–att–int	25–38–0	28–53–1
Turnovers		
Time of possession	20:45	39:15

Team	Category	Player	Statistics
Incarnate Word	Passing	Lindsey Scott Jr.	24/36, 382 yards, 5 TD
Incarnate Word	Rushing	Marcus Cooper	20 carries, 254 yards, 2 TD
Incarnate Word	Receiving	Darion Chafin	6 receptions, 143 yards, 3 TD
Northwestern State	Passing	Zachary Clement	28/52, 239 yards, 1 TD, 1 INT
Northwestern State	Rushing	Scooter Adams	17 carries, 39 yards
Northwestern State	Receiving	Zach Patterson	8 receptions, 64 yards

== FCS Playoffs ==
=== No. 11 Furman Paladins – Second Round ===
Uniform combination
Helmet	Jersey	Pants

FCS Playoffs Second Round

Quarter	1	2	3	4	Total
No. 11 Paladins	17	0	7	14	38
No. 5 Cardinals	14	14	3	10	41

at Gayle and Tom Benson Stadium, San Antonio, TX

- Date: December 3
- Game time: 1:00 p.m.
- Game weather: Temperature: 63 • Wind: NE 10 mph • Weather: Mostly Cloudy
- Game attendance: 2,373
- Referee: Tim Hedgepeth
- TV announcers (ESPN+): David Saltzman (play-by-play) and Taylor McHargue (analyst)
- Box Score

Game information

First Quarter

- FU – 14:02 Cally Chizik 36 yard interception return, Axel Lepvreayu kick
  FU 7–0
- UIW – 10:51 Darion Chafin 21 yard pass from Lindsey Scott Jr., Carson Mohr kick
  Tied 7–7 Drive: 9 plays, 75 yards, 3:11
- UIW – 6:06 Darion Chafin 80 yard pass from Lindsey Scott Jr., Carson Mohr kick
  UIW 14–7 Drive: 4 plays, 95 yards, 1:17
- FU – 3:29 Ian William 49 yard field goal
  UIW 14–10 Drive: 8 plays, 49 yards, 2:32
- FUR – 2:19 Dominic Robert 1 yard run, Axel Lepvreau kick
  FU 17–14 Drive: 2 plays, 5 yards, 0:37

Second Quarter

- UIW – 13:49 Darion Chafin 27 yard pass from Lindsey Scott Jr., Carson Mohr kick
  UIW 21–17 Drive: 10 plays, 71 yards, 3:22
- UIW – 7:09 Taylor Grimes 42 yard pass from Lindsey Scott Jr., Carson Mohr kick
  UIW 28–17 Drive: 9 plays, 88 yards, 3:06

Third Quarter

- UIW – 12:38 Carson Mohr 22 yard field goal
  UIW 31–17 Drive: 5 plays, 26 yards, 1:39
- FU – 3:28 Tyler Huff 11 yard run, Axel Lepvreay kick
  UIW 31–24 Drive: 10 plays, 52 yards, 3:29

Fourth Quarter

- UIW – 14:13 Carson Mohr 34 yard field goal
  UIW 34–24 Drive: 10 plays, 34 yards, 4:03
- FU – 10:18 Joshua Harris 50 yard pass from Tyler Huff, Axel Lepvreau kick
  UIW 34–31 Drive: 1 play, 50 yards, 0:08
- FU – 6:55 Tyler Huff 1 yard run, Axel Lepvreau kick
  FU 38–34 Drive: 7 plays, 32 yards, 2:58
- UIW – 1:54 Kole Wilson 32 yard pass from Lindsey Scott Jr., Carson Mohr kick
  UIW 41–38 Drive: 4 plays, 43 yards, 0:38

Statistics	FU	UIW
First downs	22	31
Plays–yards	64–332	97–613
Rushes–yards	36–161	48–219
Passing yards	171	394
Passing: comp–att–int	16–28–2	33–49–2
Turnovers		
Time of possession	27:39	32:21

Team	Category	Player	Statistics
Furman	Passing	Tyler Huff	16/28, 171 yards, 1 TD, 2 INT
Furman	Rushing	Tyler Huff	9 carries, 64 yards, 2 TD
Furman	Receiving	Joshua Harris	4 receptions, 69 yards, 1 TD
Incarnate Word	Passing	Lindsey Scott Jr.	33/49, 394 yards, 5 TD, 2 INT
Incarnate Word	Rushing	Lindsey Scott Jr.	23 rushes, 124 yards
Incarnate Word	Receiving	Darion Chafin	8 receptions, 166 yards, 3 TD

=== @ No. 2 Sacramento State Hornets – Quarterfinals ===
Uniform combination
Helmet	Jersey	Pants

FCS Playoffs Quarterfinals

Quarter	1	2	3	4	Total
No. 5 Cardinals	7	21	10	28	66
No. 2 Hornets	14	3	17	29	63

at Hornet Stadium, Sacramento, CA

- Date: December 9
- Game time: 9:30 p.m.
- Game weather: Temperature: 48 • Wind: None • Weather: Sunny
- Game attendance: 13,722
- Referee: Bruce Austin
- TV announcers (ESPN+): Connor Onion (play-by-play) and Charles Arbuckle (analyst)
- Box Score

Game information

First Quarter

- SACST – 8:53 Cam Skattebo 1 yard run, Kyle Sentkowski kick
  SACST 7–0 Drive: 10 plays, 81 yards, 3:12
- UIW – 5:12 Marcus Cooper 20 yard pass from Lindsey Scott Jr., Carson Mohr kick
  Tied 7–7 Drive: 11 plays, 86 yards, 3:34
- SACST – 2:28 Marcus Fulcher 35 yard run, Kyle Sentkowski kick
  SACST 14–7 Drive: 6 plays, 65 yards, 2:44

Second Quarter

- UIW – 12:37 Lindsey Scott Jr. 1 yard run, Carson Mohr kick
  Tied 14–14 Drive: 15 plays, 79 yards, 4:45
- SACST – 7:25 Kyle Sentkowski 30 yard field goal
  SACST 17–14 Drive: 13 plays, 66 yards, 5:07
- UIW – 2:56 Roger McCuller 2 yard pass from Lindsey Scott Jr., Carson Mohr kick
  UIW 21–17 Drive: 6 plays, 29 yards, 1:43
- UIW – 0:11 Marcus Cooper, 4 yard run, Carson Mohr kick
  UIW 28–17 Drive: 9 plays, 39 yards, 1:23

Third Quarter

- SACST – 11:04 Cam Skattebo 2 yard run, Kyle Sentkowski kick
  UIW 28–24 Drive: 12 plays, 75 yards, 3:56
- UIW - 8:26 Carson Mohr 27 yard field goal
  UIW 31–24 Drive: 8 plays, 73 yards, 2:31
- SACST – 4:16 Pierre Williams 16 yard pass from Asher O'Hara, Kyle Sentkowski kick
  Tied 31–31 Drive: 9 plays, 75 yards, 4:04
- UIW – 2:29 Darion Chafin 47 yard pass from Lindsey Scott Jr., Carson Mohr kick
  UIW 38–31 Drive: 5 plays, 74 yards, 1:42
- SACST – 0:04 Kyle Sentkowski 26 yard field goal
  UIW 38–34 Drive: 9 plays, 49 yards, 2:17

Fourth Quarter

- UIW – 14:50 Lindsey Scott Jr. 64 yard run, Carson Mohr kick
  UIW 45–34 Drive: 1 play, 64 yards, 0:10
- SACST – 12:08 Marshel Martin 19 yard pass from Cam Skattebo, Kyle Sentkowski kick
  UIW 45–41 Drive: 7 plays, 67 yards, 2:37
- SACST – 10:12 Marshel Martin 14 yard pass from Jake Dunniway, Kyle Sentkowski kick
  SACST 48–45 Drive: 6 plays, 55 yards, 1:53
- UIW – 9:23 Marcus Cooper 67 yard run, Carson Mohr kick
  UIW 52–48 Drive: 3 plays, 75 yards, 0:49
- UIW – 8:30 Kelechi Anyalebechi 55 yard fumble recovery, Carson Mohr kick
  UIW 59–48
- SACST – 4:57 Pierre Williams 10 yard pass from Jake Dunniway, Marcus Fulcher pass from Jake Dunniway
  UIW 59–56 Drive: 9 plays, 70 yards, 3:27
- SACST – 1:43 Marshel Martin 4 yard run, Kyle Sentkowski kick
  SACST 63–59 Drive: 8 plays, 57 yards, 3:14
- UIW – 0:27 Taylor Grimes 21 yard pass from Lindsey Scott Jr., Carson Mohr kick
  UIW 66–63 Drive: 7 plays, 75 yards, 1:16

Statistics	UIW	SAC
First downs	25	49
Plays–yards	73–579	109–738
Rushes–yards	41–342	53–333
Passing yards	237	405
Passing: comp–att–int	20–32–0	34–56–2
Turnovers		
Time of possession	21:32	38:28

Team	Category	Player	Statistics
Incarnate Word	Passing	Lindsey Scott Jr.	19/31, 219 yards, 4 TD
Incarnate Word	Rushing	Marcus Cooper	22 carries, 176 yards, 2 TD
Incarnate Word	Receiving	Marcus Cooper	4 receptions, 58 yards, 1 TD
Sacramento State	Passing	Jake Dunniway	19/32, 228 yards, 2 TD, 2 INT
Sacramento State	Rushing	Marcus Fulcher	9 rushes, 108 yards, 1 TD
Sacramento State	Receiving	Marshel Martin	12 receptions, 144 yards, 2 TD

=== @ No. 4 North Dakota State Bison – Semifinals ===
Uniform combination
Helmet	Jersey	Pants

FCS Playoffs Semifinals

Quarter	1	2	3	4	Total
No. 5 Cardinals	16	0	13	3	32
No. 4 Bison	3	14	7	11	35

at Fargodome, Fargo, ND

- Date: December 16
- Game time: 6:00 p.m.
- Game weather: Indoor
- Game attendance: 12,569
- Referee: Eric Lewis
- TV announcers (ESPN2): Drew Carter (play-by-play), Aaron Murray (analyst) and Marilyn Payne (sideline)
- Box Score

Game information

First Quarter

- UIW – 10:37 Darion Chafin 1 yard pass from Lindsey Scott Jr., Carson Mohr kick
  UIW 7–0 Drive: 10 plays, 75 yards, 4:23
- UIW – 7:42 Jarrell Wiley 15 yard run, Carson Mohr kick
  UIW 14–0 Drive: 6 plays, 85 yards, 1:26
- UIW – 7:33 0 yard safety
  UIW 16–0
- NDSU – 2:15 Griffin Crosa 27 yard field goal
  UIW 16–3 Drive: 4 plays, -7 yards, 1:35

Second Quarter

- NDSU – 4:46 Kobe Johnson 4 yard run, Griffin Crosa kick
  UIW 16–10 Drive: 8 plays, 93 yards, 3:59
- NDSU – 0:47 Cam Miller 2 yard run, Griffin Crosa kick
  NDSU 17–16 Drive: 5 plays, 17 yards, 2:44

Third Quarter

- NDSU – 12:56 Kobe Johnson 49 yard run, Griffin Crosa kick
  NDSU 24–16 Drive: 4 plays, 74 yards, 1:58
- UIW – 7:05 Lindsey Scott Jr. 1 yard run, 2 point conversion failed
  NDSU 24–22 Drive: 15 plays, 75 yards, 5:51
- UIW – 2:59 Lindsey Scott Jr. 1 yard run, Carson Mohr kick
  UIW 29–24 Drive: 5 plays, 61 yards, 1:05

Fourth Quarter

- NDSU – 13:03 Griffin Crosa 47 yard field goal
  UIW 29–27 Drive: 9 plays, 37 yards, 4:49
- UIW – 9:38 Carson Mohr 41 yard field goal
  UIW 32–27 Drive: 10 plays, 51 yards, 3:25
- NDSU – 8:11 Kobe Johnson 31 yard run, Joe Stoffel pass
  NDSU 35–32 Drive: 3 plays, 65 yards, 1:27

Statistics	UIW	NDSU
First downs	29	15
Plays–yards	94–539	60–333
Rushes–yards	48–257	48–328
Passing yards	282	5
Passing: comp–att–int	30–46–2	1–12–0
Turnovers		
Time of possession	28:57	31:03

Team	Category	Player	Statistics
Incarnate Word	Passing	Lindsey Scott Jr.	30/46, 282 yards, 1 TD, 2 INT
Incarnate Word	Rushing	Marcus Cooper	20 carries, 112 yards
Incarnate Word	Receiving	Taylor Grimes	7 receptions, 77 yards
North Dakota State	Passing	Cam Miller	1/12, 5 yards
North Dakota State	Rushing	Kobe Johnson	15 rushes, 136 yards, 3 TD
North Dakota State	Receiving	Joe Stoffel	1 reception, 5 yards

== Rankings ==
Ranking movements Legend: ██ Increase in ranking ██ Decrease in ranking т = Tied with team above or below
	Week													
Poll	Pre	1	2	3	4	5	6	7	8	9	10	11	12	Final
STATS FCS	14	8	6	4T	11	10	8т	8	8	7	6	5	5	3
Coaches	14	9	8	7	12	11	10	10	9	8	7	7	7	3
