= Mack Leftwich =

American football coach (born 1994)

Current position
- Title: Offensive coordinator
- Team: Texas Tech
- Conference: Big 12

Biographical details
- Born: November 18, 1994 (age 31); Denton, Texas, U.S.

Playing career
- 2013–2016: UTEP
- Position: Quarterback

Coaching career (HC unless noted)
- 2016: UTEP (SA)
- 2017: Lehman HS (TX) (OC/QB)
- 2018: Incarnate Word (GA)
- 2019–2021: Incarnate Word (QB)
- 2022: Incarnate Word (OC/QB)
- 2023–2024: Texas State (OC/QB)
- 2025–present: Texas Tech (OC/QB)

Mack Hays Leftwich (born November 18, 1994) is an American football coach and former player. He is the offensive coordinator for Texas Tech Red Raiders football team.

== Early life and playing career ==
Leftwich was born in Denton, Texas and spent most of his childhood there while his father, Spencer Leftwich, was the offensive line coach at the University of North Texas. He moved to Wexford, Pennsylvania and enrolled at North Allegheny Senior High School prior to his junior year of high school. As a senior, he was named the Pennsylvania Player of the Year and first team All-State after completing 177-of-268 pass attempts for 3,331 yards with 45 touchdowns and four interceptions and also rushing 128 times for 553 yards and 10 touchdowns. Leftwich initially committed to play college football at Stephen F. Austin University. He later flipped his commitment to the University of Texas at El Paso (UTEP), where his father was the offensive line coach, after receiving a scholarship offer from head coach Sean Kugler, whose son was a teammate at North Allegheny.

Leftwich entered his freshman season at UTEP with the intention of redshirting but ultimately started the last four games of the season, completing 44-of-75 pass attempts for 458 yards with two touchdown passes and two interceptions. He then redshirted his true sophomore season. Leftwich was named the Miners' starting quarterback entering his redshirt sophomore season. He started seven games, missing five games due to two separate concussions, and passed for 1,228 yards and nine touchdowns with three interceptions. During spring practices Leftwich suffered a serious shoulder injury that ultimately led him to retire from playing.

== Coaching career ==
Leftwich spent his redshirt junior season at UTEP as a student coach and added additional coursework to graduate with a degree in math education with hopes of landing a teaching and coaching position. After graduating, he was hired to be the offensive coordinator and quarterbacks coach at Lehman High School.

Leftwich became a graduate assistant at the University of the Incarnate Word (UIW) in 2018. He was elevated to the Cardinals' quarterbacks coach after one season. Leftwich identified and was the primary recruiter of future Jerry Rice Award-winning quarterback Cam Ward. He was originally expected to be hired to an off-field coaching position at Washington State after UIW head coach Eric Morris was hired to be the program's offensive coordinator. Leftwich ultimately decided to stay at UIW and was subsequently promoted to offensive coordinator by new head coach G. J. Kinne. Incarnate Word averaged 52 points and 581 yards per game and led the FCS in scoring in 2022 while quarterback Lindsey Scott Jr. won the Walter Payton Award.

Leftwich was hired to be the offensive coordinator at Texas State on December 13, 2022, after Kinne was hired as the Bobcats' head coach. He was nominated for the Broyles Award during his first season at Texas State.

On December 6, 2024, Leftwich was hired as the offensive coordinator at Texas Tech.
