= Ismail Mahdi =

American football running back (born 2003)

No. 21 – Arizona Wildcats
- Position: Running back
- Class: Senior

Personal information
- Born: May 28, 2003 (age 23); Kenya
- Listed height: 5 ft 8 in (1.73 m)
- Listed weight: 179 lb (81 kg)

Career information
- High school: Plano East (Plano, Texas, U.S.)
- College: Houston Christian (2022); Texas State (2023–2024); Arizona (2025)

Awards and highlights
- 2× First-team All-Sun Belt (2023, 2024)
- Stats at ESPN

Ismail Mahdi (born May 28, 2003) is a Kenyan college football running back for the Arizona Wildcats. Mahdi began his college career with Houston Christian before transferring to Texas State Bobcats in 2023.

== Early life ==
Mahdi's father was Somali and his mother was Kenyan. They fled Somalia due to the Somali civil war, and Mahdi was born in a refugee camp in Kenya on May 28, 2003.

In late 2003, Mahdi and his family migrated to the United States, residing in the Dallas–Fort Worth metroplex. Mahdi attended Plano East Senior High School in Plano, Texas. As a junior, he totaled 1,607 yards and 15 touchdowns. As a senior, Mahdi rushed for 1,362 yards and 14 touchdowns, before his season was ended due to a knee injury. He committed to play college football at Houston Christian University.

== College career ==
=== Houston Christian ===
As a freshman, Mahdi recorded 568 rushing yards, 333 receiving yards, and five total touchdowns, being named a finalist for the Jerry Rice Award. After the season, he entered the transfer portal.

=== Texas State ===
Following his decision to transfer to Texas State University, Mahdi led the FBS in all-purpose yards through five games, recording 934 total yards. In the first game of the season against Baylor, Mahdi tallied 83 yards rushing and two total touchdowns, in a 42–31 upset win. Against Nevada, he rushed for a career-high 216 yards and two touchdowns. The following week, Mahdi returned the opening kickoff 100 yards for a touchdown, while also rushing for three touchdowns, helping lead Texas State to a 50–36 victory over Southern Mississippi. As a result of his performance, he was named the Hornung Award National Player of the Week.

On December 9, 2024, Mahdi announced that he would enter the transfer portal.

=== Arizona ===
On December 21, 2024, Mahdi announced that he would transfer to the University of Arizona.

=== Statistics ===
College statistics
Year	Team	Games	Rushing				Receiving			
Year	Team	GP	Att	Yards	Avg	TD	Rec	Yards	Avg	TD
2022	Houston Christian	8	104	459	4.4	1	30	250	8.3	2
2023	Texas State	13	223	1,331	6.0	10	20	275	13.8	1
2024	Texas State	12	183	991	5.4	4	24	195	8.1	2
2025	Arizona	13	134	859	6.4	4	17	119	7.0	1
Career		46	644	3,640	5.6	19	91	839	9.2	6

== Professional career ==
Pre-draft measurables
Height	Weight	Arm length	Hand span	Wingspan	40-yard dash	10-yard split	20-yard split	20-yard shuttle	Three-cone drill	Vertical jump	Broad jump	Bench press
5 ft 8 1/4 in (1.73 m)	179 lb (81 kg)	29 in (0.74 m)	9 1/8 in (0.23 m)	5 ft 9 1/8 in (1.76 m)	4.51 s	1.53 s	2.58 s	4.71 s	7.63 s	33.5 in (0.85 m)	9 ft 11 in (3.02 m)	10 reps
All values from Pro Day
