= G. J. Kinne =

American gridiron football player and coach (born 1988)

GJ Kinne
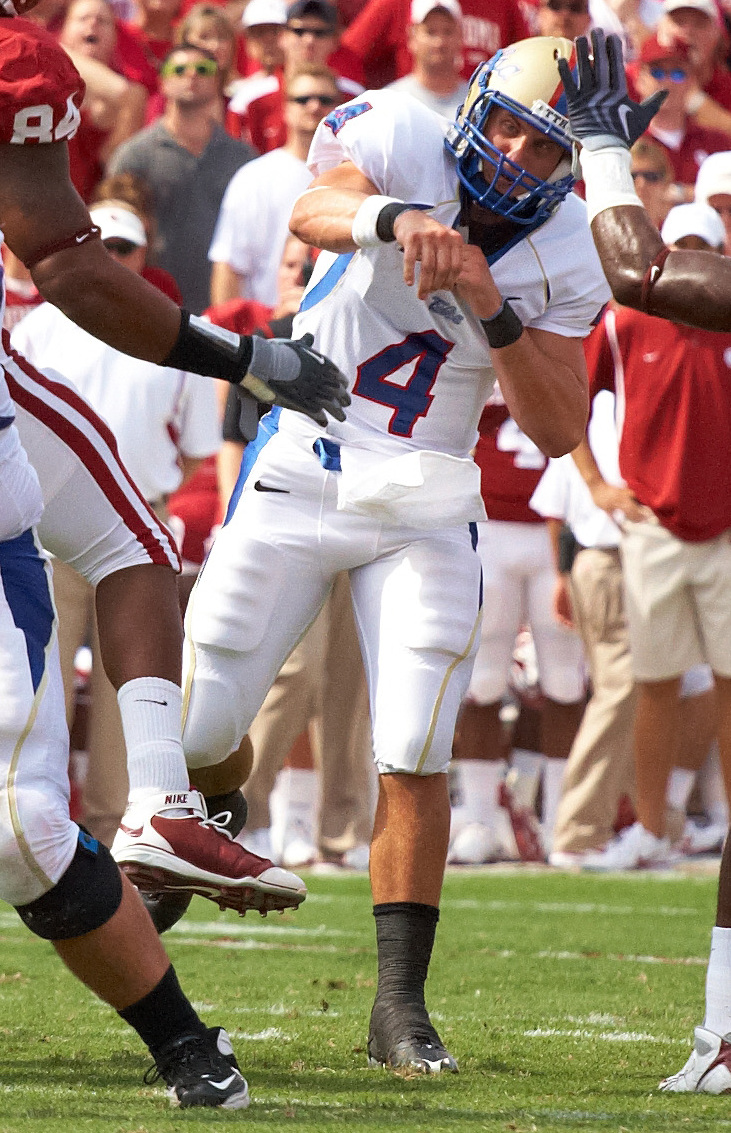
- Kinne with Tulsa in 2009

Current position
- Title: Head coach
- Team: Texas State
- Conference: Pac-12
- Record: 30–20
- Annual salary: $2.0 Million

Biographical details
- Born: December 1, 1988 (age 37); Mesquite, Texas, U.S.

Playing career
- 2007: Texas
- 2008–2011: Tulsa
- 2012: New York Jets (Note: Offseason and/or practice squad member only)
- 2012: Omaha Nighthawks
- 2013: San Antonio Talons
- 2013–2015: Philadelphia Eagles
- 2015-2016: New York Giants
- 2016: Calgary Stampeders
- 2016: Saskatchewan Roughriders
- Position: Quarterback

Coaching career (HC unless noted)
- 2017: SMU (GA)
- 2018: Arkansas (OA)
- 2019: Philadelphia Eagles (OA)
- 2020: Hawaii (OC/QB)
- 2021: UCF (Co-OC/QB)
- 2022: Incarnate Word
- 2023–present: Texas State

Head coaching record
- Overall: 42–22
- Bowls: 3–0
- Tournaments: 2–1

Accomplishments and honors

Championships
- 1 Southland (2022)

Awards
- As a player: C-USA Offensive Player of the Year (2010); First-team All-C-USA (2010); Second-team All-C-USA (2011)

Gary Joe Kinne III (born December 1, 1988) is an American football coach and former player who is currently the head coach at Texas State University. He played as a quarterback and was signed by the New York Jets as an undrafted free agent in 2012. He played college football for the Texas Longhorns and the Tulsa Golden Hurricane.

== Early years ==
Kinne was born in Mesquite, Texas, a suburb just east of Dallas, to Gary Joe Kinne Jr. and Jocelyne Karr. His father was a former standout linebacker at Baylor University and later an assistant coach at Allen High School, Kaufman High School, and was the defensive coordinator at Mesquite High School, along with eventually being the head coach of Sherman High School. In 2003, his father accepted the head coaching job at Canton High School in East Texas, a town about 60 miles east of Dallas. Kinne became the starting quarterback of the Eagle varsity football team as a freshman. In his first game against rival Grand Saline High School, Kinne played well and exhibited a strong arm and good accuracy despite a 20–13 loss. He led Canton High to its first playoff victory since 1964 and finished the year as Class AAA area finalists with an 8–4 record. He was named All East Texas and was named The Tyler Morning Telegraph's East Texas Newcomer of the year. As a sophomore, he led CHS to another good season with an 8–2 record but narrowly missed the playoffs.

=== Father's shooting ===
In the spring of 2005, Kinne's father, who was also his coach at Canton High, was shot in the chest by the disgruntled parent of one of the players he coached. According to police reports, Jeff Doyal Robertson, the father of a player who had often complained to coaches and administrators regarding the way his son was treated, walked into the Canton Fieldhouse and shot Coach Kinne at point blank range. Robertson then fled in his pickup truck and headed east towards Tyler, Texas. Kinne Jr. was on the phone with another coach who was at another school when he was shot. Kinne III was taken by police into protective custody, and then told that his father had died when in fact he had survived despite being given only a 10% chance to live. Robertson was later apprehended in an area north of Tyler near Interstate 20 where he had slashed his wrists in an apparent suicide attempt. Robertson was convicted of aggravated assault with a deadly weapon and was sentenced to 20 years in prison.

=== Senior year ===
After the shooting, Kinne stayed one more year at Canton High School, leading the team to its best season in school history with a 12–2 record, losing to Tatum High School, the eventual state champion. After the 2005 season, Kinne's father, who had recovered from his wounds, was offered a job at Baylor University, which he accepted. Kinne then decided to move to Gilmer, Texas about 70 miles to the east of Canton, to live with his mother and stepfather. The decision to move was controversial as many speculated that Kinne moved for athletic reasons, which is prohibited by the UIL, the governing body of Texas high school athletics. Kinne enrolled at Gilmer High School and became the starting quarterback, leading the Buckeyes to a 10–0 record, but was upset in the first round of the playoffs by Liberty-Eylau High School. He finished his career with 11,695 passing yards and 130 touchdown passes. He also rushed for 3,327 yards with 48 touchdowns.

College recruiting
Name	Hometown	School	Height	Weight	40^{‡}	Commit date
G.J. Kinne; QB	Gilmer, Texas	Gilmer High School	6 ft 2 in (1.88 m)	207 lb (94 kg)	4.6	Dec 28, 2006
G.J. Kinne; QB	Recruit ratings: Scout: Rivals: (78)					
Overall recruit ranking: Scout: 38 (QB) Rivals: 15 (QB), 58 (TX) ESPN: 25 (QB)
Note: In many cases, Scout, Rivals, 247Sports, On3, and ESPN may conflict in their listings of height and weight.; In these cases, the average was taken. ESPN grades are on a 100-point scale.; Sources: "Texas Football Commitment List". Rivals.; "Texas College Football Recruiting Commits". Scout.; "ESPN". ESPN.; "Scout.com Team Recruiting Rankings". Scout.; "2007 Team Ranking". Rivals.com.

Kinne committed to Texas on December 28, 2006. Kinne also received football scholarship offers from Baylor, Florida, Nebraska, Oklahoma and Tennessee.

== College career ==
Kinne attended the University of Texas at Austin as a redshirt freshman in 2007, but was buried in the depth chart and decided to transfer. He transferred to the University of Tulsa effective May 7, 2008. Kinne became the starting quarterback for the Golden Hurricane in 2009 and remained the starter throughout his career. Recruited under coach Gus Malzahn, he finished his career with 9,472 yards and 81 touchdowns. In 2010 he was named C-USA Offensive Player of the Year and First-team All-C-USA as he led the team to a Conference-USA co-championship, a victory over #24 Hawaii in the 2010 Hawaii Bowl and a final ranking of #24. In 2011 he led them to an 8-3 regular season record and a trip to the 2011 Armed Forces Bowl which they lost in the last 11 seconds to BYU; and he was named to the C-USA second team.

In January 2012, Kinne was named MVP of the NFLPA Collegiate Bowl.

== Professional career ==
=== New York Jets ===
Kinne signed with the New York Jets as an undrafted free agent on April 28, 2012. He was waived by the team on June 28.

=== Omaha Nighthawks ===
Kinne joined the roster of the Omaha Nighthawks of the United Football League for their 2012 season. Over the 4-game shortened season he played in 2 games and went 6 for 15 for 53 yards with 2 interceptions and no passing TDs. He also rushed for 30 yards on 6 rushes. The United Football League folded later that year and based on record Omaha was named the league runner-up.

=== San Antonio Talons ===
Kinne signed with the San Antonio Talons of the Arena Football League in December 2012, but when he signed with the Eagles a few months later he was suspended and exempted by the team.

=== Philadelphia Eagles ===
On February 28, 2013, Kinne signed with the Philadelphia Eagles, and he was released on August 30, 2013. On October 22, 2013, Kinne was re-signed to the Eagles practice squad because of injuries to both of its top quarterbacks, Michael Vick and Nick Foles. Kinne was signed to a futures contract with the Eagles in January 2014. He was released on August 30, but signed to the practice squad the next day. Kinne signed a futures contract with the Eagles on December 30, 2014. He converted to wide receiver in May 2015. On Sunday, August 30, 2015, Kinne was again waived by the Eagles.

=== New York Giants ===
On September 9, 2015, Kinne was signed by the New York Giants and was placed on the practice squad. On September 16, 2015, he was released by the Giants. On September 30, 2015, he was re-signed to the Giants' practice squad. On January 4, 2016, Kinne signed a reserve/future contract with the Giants. On May 5, 2016, the Giants waived Kinne.

=== Calgary Stampeders ===
Kinne signed with the Calgary Stampeders of the Canadian Football League (CFL) on June 13, 2016. Less than a week later, on June 19, 2016, Kinne was released by the team.

=== Saskatchewan Roughriders ===
Kinney signed with the Saskatchewan Roughriders (CFL) on June 24, 2016. Kinne made his CFL debut in the final game of the 2016 CFL season, completing 4 of 11 pass attempts for 24 yards. Kinne announced his retirement from professional football on May 9, 2017.

== Coaching career ==
=== Early coaching career ===
Kinne is from the Gus Malzahn coaching tree. In 2017, Kinne was hired as an assistant coach with SMU under coach Chad Morris. When Morris joined the University of Arkansas before SMU played in the Frisco Bowl, new head coach Sonny Dykes chose to have Kinne serve as offensive coordinator and play caller for the bowl game. Kinne eventually followed Morris to Arkansas in 2018 as an offensive analyst.

On February 25, 2019, Kinne was named an offensive assistant coach for the Philadelphia Eagles, working with special projects.

=== Hawaii ===
On January 31, 2020, it was announced that Kinne was leaving the Eagles to become the offensive coordinator for the University of Hawaii under head coach Todd Graham.

=== UCF ===
Kinne joined the staff at UCF as their co-offensive coordinator and quarterbacks coach in 2021, having previously played and been mentored by Gus Malzahn at Tulsa. After an injury to starting quarterback Dillon Gabriel early in the season, Kinne helped coach and mentor true freshman Mikey Keene. UCF went 9-4, winning the Gasparilla Bowl against Florida and having one of the nation's top offenses that year.

=== Incarnate Word ===
On December 21, 2021, Kinne was announced as the new head football coach at the University of the Incarnate Word (UIW). In his first year as a head coach, he led his team to a Southland Conference championship. UIW was the No. 7 ranked team nationally, and a seed in the FCS Playoffs. The Cardinals reached the semifinals of the 2022 FCS Playoffs and went 12-2 overall. They ranked No. 1 in all of NCAA Division I – FBS and FCS – with 51.5 points and 581.2 yards per game. The team's defense ranked first in FCS in tackles for loss, ninth in sacks, and 38th in scoring defense. Kinne was a finalist for the Eddie Robinson Award in 2022, which is presented to the nation's top coach. Quarterback Lindsey Scott Jr. was the 2022 Walter Payton Award winner under Kinne. Scott amassed 71 TDs (60 passing, 11 rushing), 4,686 yards passing, and 712 rushing.

=== Texas State ===
Texas State University hired Kinne on December 2, 2022, to replace Jake Spavital. Kinne took over following the conclusion of Incarnate Word's season. Texas State re-signed Kinne on November 22, 2024 with a new seven-year contract.

== Head coaching record ==
Year	Team	Overall	Conference	Standing	Bowl/playoffs	Coaches^{#}	AP/STATS^{°}
Incarnate Word Cardinals (Southland Conference) (2022)
2022	Incarnate Word	12–2	5–1	T–1st	L NCAA Division I Semifinal	3	3
Incarnate Word:		12–2	5–1				
Texas State Bobcats (Sun Belt Conference) (2023–2025)
2023	Texas State	8–5	4–4	T–2nd (West)	W First Responder		
2024	Texas State	8–5	5–3	T–2nd (West)	W First Responder		
2025	Texas State	7–6	3–5	T–5th (West)	W Armed Forces		
Texas State Bobcats (Pac-12 Conference) (2026–present)
2026	Texas State	7–4	5–2				
Texas State:		30–20	17–14				
Total:		42–22					
National championship Conference title Conference division title or championship game berth
^{†}Indicates Bowl Coalition, Bowl Alliance, BCS, or CFP / New Years' Six bowl.; ^{#}Rankings from final Coaches Poll.; ^{°}Rankings from final AP Poll.
