= Nash Jones =

American football player (born 2002)

No. 59 – Edmonton Elks
- Position: Guard
- Roster status: Practice roster
- CFL status: American

Personal information
- Born: March 29, 2002 (age 24); Nacogdoches, Texas, U.S.
- Listed height: 6 ft 4 in (1.93 m)
- Listed weight: 314 lb (142 kg)

Career information
- High school: Nacogdoches (Nacogdoches, Texas)
- College: Incarnate Word (2020–2022); Texas State (2023–2024)
- NFL draft: 2025: undrafted

Career history
- Los Angeles Chargers (2025)*; Denver Broncos (2025)*; Edmonton Elks (2026–present)
- * Offseason or practice squad member only

Awards and highlights
- Grey Cup champion (2026); First team All-Southland (2021); Second team All-Southland (2022)
- Stats at Pro Football Reference

Nash James Jones (born March 29, 2002) is an American professional football guard for the Edmonton Elks of the Canadian Football League (CFL). He played college football for the Incarnate Word Cardinals and the Texas State Bobcats. Jones was signed by the Los Angeles Chargers as an undrafted free agent in 2025. He has also been a member of the Denver Broncos.

== Early life ==
Jones was born on March 29, 2002, to Rod and Veronica Jones. Growing up in Duncanville, Texas, Jones began playing football at the age of twelve and attended Nacogdoches High School. At Nacogdoches, he helped the football team reach the playoffs for the first time in over 20 years, while earning all-district honors in both his junior and senior years.

== College career ==
=== Incarnate Word ===
In his freshman year, Jones started in all six games at the right tackle position during a season shortened by the COVID-19 pandemic. During the 2021 season, Jones played in all 13 games. In 2022, Jones was named a second-team All-Southland Conference player.

=== Texas State ===
In 2023, Jones transferred to Texas State following their hiring of Incarnate Word head coach G. J. Kinne. After playing in five games, he suffered a lower leg injury that caused him to miss the remainder of the season. Prior to the 2024 season, Jones switched positions from left tackle to left guard. During his final season at Texas State, Jones started in all 12 games and did not allow a single sack. He was subsequently named an All-Sun Belt Honorable Mention.

== Professional career ==
Pre-draft measurables
Height	Weight	Arm length	Hand span	Wingspan	40-yard dash	10-yard split	20-yard split	Vertical jump	Broad jump	Bench press
6 ft 4 in (1.93 m)	320 lb (145 kg)	33 1/8 in (0.84 m)	10 1/2 in (0.27 m)	6 ft 10 3/8 in (2.09 m)	5.33 s	1.82 s	3.07 s	30.0 in (0.76 m)	9 ft 5 in (2.87 m)	29 reps
All values from Pro Day

=== Los Angeles Chargers ===
On April 26, 2025, Jones signed with the Los Angeles Chargers as an undrafted free agent after going unselected in the 2025 NFL draft. On August 26, he was waived by the Chargers during final roster cuts.

=== Denver Broncos ===
On December 17, 2025, Jones was signed to the Denver Broncos' practice squad. He was released on January 7, 2026. On January 29, Jones signed a reserve/futures contract with the Broncos. On June 18, he was waived by Denver.

=== Edmonton Elks ===
The Edmonton Elks announced that they had signed Jones to their practice roster on September 15, 2026.

== Personal life ==
Jones has two brothers and one sister. His father formerly played college basketball at San Diego State.
