= 2023 Arkansas State Red Wolves football team =

American college football season

2023 Arkansas State Red Wolves football

Camellia Bowl, L 19–21 vs. Northern Illinois
- Conference: Sun Belt Conference
- West Division
- Record: 6–7 (4–4 Sun Belt)
- Head coach: Butch Jones (3rd season)
- Offensive coordinator: Keith Heckendorf (5th season)
- Offensive scheme: Power spread
- Defensive coordinator: Rob Harley (3rd season)
- Base defense: 4–3
- Home stadium: Centennial Bank Stadium

2023 Sun Belt Conference football standings
	Conf.			Overall
Team	W		L	W		L
East Division
James Madison* x	7	–	1	11	–	2
Appalachian State y	6	–	2	9	–	5
Coastal Carolina	5	–	3	8	–	5
Old Dominion	5	–	3	6	–	7
Georgia State	3	–	5	7	–	6
Marshall	3	–	5	6	–	7
Georgia Southern	3	–	5	6	–	7
West Division
Troy xy$	7	–	1	11	–	3
Texas State	4	–	4	8	–	5
Arkansas State	4	–	4	6	–	7
South Alabama	4	–	4	7	–	6
Louisiana	3	–	5	6	–	7
Southern Miss	2	–	6	3	–	9
Louisiana–Monroe	0	–	8	2	–	10
Championship: Troy 49, Appalachian State 23
$ – Conference champion; x – Division champion/co-champions; y – Championship game participant; * – Ineligible for postseason play due to FCS-to-FBS transition rules

The 2023 Arkansas State Red Wolves football team represented Arkansas State University as a member of the Sun Belt Conference during the 2023 NCAA Division I FBS football season. Led by third-year head coach Butch Jones, the Red Wolves played their home games at Centennial Bank Stadium in Jonesboro, Arkansas.

== Schedule ==
The 2023 football schedule was announced February 24, 2023.

Date	Time	Opponent	Site	TV	Result	Attendance
September 2	11:00 a.m.	at No. 20 Oklahoma*	Gaylord Family Oklahoma Memorial Stadium; Norman, OK	ESPN	L 0–73	83,221
September 9	6:00 p.m.	Memphis*	Centennial Bank Stadium; Jonesboro, AR (Paint Bucket Bowl)	ESPN+	L 3–37	18,724
September 16	6:00 p.m.	Stony Brook*	Centennial Bank Stadium; Jonesboro, AR	ESPN+	W 31–7	14,327
September 23	6:00 p.m.	Southern Miss	Centennial Bank Stadium; Jonesboro, AR	ESPN+	W 44–37	16,601
September 30	2:30 p.m.	at UMass*	Warren McGuirk Alumni Stadium; Hadley, MA	ESPN+	W 52–28	9,494
October 7	3:00 p.m.	at Troy	Veterans Memorial Stadium; Troy, AL	ESPN+	L 3–37	26,957
October 21	6:00 p.m.	Coastal Carolina^{†}	Centennial Bank Stadium; Jonesboro, AR	ESPN+	L 17–27	18,228
October 28	4:00 p.m.	at Louisiana–Monroe	Malone Stadium; Monroe, LA	ESPN+	W 34–24	14,006
November 4	2:00 p.m.	Louisiana	Centennial Bank Stadium; Jonesboro, AR	ESPN+	W 37–17	15,881
November 11	4:00 p.m.	at South Alabama	Hancock Whitney Stadium; Mobile, AL	ESPN+	L 14–21	15,242
November 18	2:00 p.m.	Texas State	Centennial Bank Stadium; Jonesboro, AR	ESPN+	W 77–31	16,721
November 25	2:30 p.m.	at Marshall	Joan C. Edwards Stadium; Huntington, WV	ESPN+	L 21–35	18,673
December 23	11:00 a.m.	vs. Northern Illinois*	Cramton Bowl; Montgomery, AL (Camellia Bowl)	ESPN	L 19–21	11,310
*Non-conference game; ^{†}Homecoming; Rankings from AP Poll and CFP Rankings released prior to game; All times are in Central time

== Preseason ==
=== Offseason ===
After a 3–9 campaign in the 2022 season, Butch Jones returns for his third season as head coach for Arkansas State. Jones was paid, in total, $825,000 last season.

=== Media poll ===
In the Sun Belt preseason coaches' poll, the Red Wolves were picked to finish in sixth place in the West division.

Media poll (West division)
Predicted finish	Team	Votes (1st place)
1	Troy	92 (10)
2	South Alabama	85 (4)
3	Louisiana	64
4	Southern Miss	62
5	Texas State	36
6	Arkansas State	33
7	ULM	20

Kicker Dominic Zvada was named to the preseason All-Sun Belt first team.

== Personnel ==
2023 Arkansas State Red Wolves football team roster
Players
Coaches
Offense

Pos.	#	Name	Class
WR	0	Daverrick Jenkins	So
QB	1	Jaylen Raynor	Fr
RB	2	Ja'Quez Cross	So
WR	3	Clyde Curry	Fr
RB	4	Brian Snead	Sr
QB	5	J. T. Shrout	Sr
WR	6	Wyatt Begeal	So
WR	7	Corey Rucker	So
WR	8	Khmari Thompson	Jr
WR	9	Courtney Jackson	Jr
WR	10	Tennel Bryant	Fr
WR	11	Adam Jones	Jr
TE	12	Emmanual Stevenson	Jr
TE	13	Miller McCrumby	So
WR	14	Jeff Foreman	Sr
QB	15	Jaxon Dailey	Fr
WR	16	Chauncy Cobb	Fr
QB	17	Christian Hunt	Fr
TE	18	Kevin Diaz	Jr
QB	19	Will Prichard	Fr
RB	20	Mike Sharpe II	So
RB	21	Zak Wallace	Jr
RB	22	Cedric Hawkins	Fr
WR	23	Takare Lipscomb	Fr
WR	28	Reagan Ealy	Jr
RB	37	Tyler Williams	Fr
TE	41	Nathan Tillman	Fr
RB	43	Kam Boyd	Fr
RB	45	Channing Woodson	Fr
TE	46	Beau Smith	Fr
OL	50	Austin Woods	So
OL	51	Jalen Cunningham	Sr
OL	52	Mason Myers	Fr
OL	54	Walker Davis	Fr
OL	55	Aleric Watson	Fr
OL	58	Cameron Ambrose	Fr
OL	65	Noah Smith	So
OL	68	Tristian Smith	So
OL	70	Tyler Adair	Fr
OL	71	Mehki Butler	Jr
OL	72	Tobias Braun	So
OL	73	Jacob Bayer	Jr
OL	74	Elijah Zollicoffer	So
OL	75	Saidou Ba	Fr
OL	77	Makilan Thomas	So
OL	78	Hamilton Hall	Sr
WR	80	Trace Corum	Fr
WR	82	Pearce Russell	Fr
WR	84	Reed Linder	Fr
WR	85	DeAndra Burns Jr.	Fr
WR	86	Blake Hegwood	Fr
TE	87	Tyler Little	Fr
WR	88	Carter Salzman	Fr
WR	89	Cam Bulluck	Fr

Defense

Pos.	#	Name	Class
CB	0	Justin Hodges	Sr
CB	1	Samy Johnson	Sr
CB	2	Leon Jones	Sr
CB	3	Davon Martin	Jr
CB	4	Taylon Doss	Jr
DB	5	Donte Thompson	Jr
S	6	Dontay Joyner	Fr
DL	7	Terion Sugick	So
S	8	Eddie Smith	Sr
S	9	Trevian Thomas	Jr
LB	10	Jordan Sample	Fr
S	12	Websley Etienne	Fr
LB	13	Gavin Potter	Jr
CB	14	James Reed III	So
S	15	Brandon Greil	Fr
CB	16	DeAubry Hood	Fr
DE	17	Blayne Toll	Jr
DE	18	Dennard Flowers	So
CB	19	Denzel Blackwell	So
CB	20	Joejo Wallace	Jr
LB	21	Melique Straker	Sr
S	22	Sam Graham	So
LB	23	Dane Motley	Jr
LB	24	Javante Mackey	Fr
DE	25	Keyron Crawford	So
CB	26	Manny Stokes Jr.	Jr
LB	27	Jamil Williams	Fr
S	28	Jerrod Johnson	Fr
S	29	Justin Parks	Jr
LB	30	Andrew Agapos	So
LB	31	RJ Kelly	Fr
DL	32	Ethan Hassler	Jr
LB	33	Cam Jeffery	Jr
DL	34	Timothy Gulley	Fr
LB	35	Cruz Temple	So
LB	36	Charles Willekes	Jr
CB	37	AJ Beale	Fr
CB	39	Jaxson Fleming	Fr
DL	40	Ian Jeffries	Fr
LB	44	Jalen Corprew	Jr
DT	45	Nate Martey	Jr
LB	47	Caden Solano	Fr
S	48	Alston Elam	So
DT	51	Bryan Williams	Fr
LB	52	Brandon Fairley	Jr
LB	53	Tony McNeal Jr.	Fr
DT	54	Malik Tillman	Fr
DL	55	Micah Bland	Sr
DL	90	Tim Hardiman	So
DL	91	Ashtin Rustemeyer	Fr
DE	92	Thurman Geathers	Sr
DE	93	Calen Presser	Fr
DL	94	Brian Alston	Fr
DE	95	Thomas Puhek	Fr
DL	96	Kadan Lewis	Fr
DL	97	VJ Bronson	Jr
DE	98	Antanius Tiggs	Fr
DE	99	Terrell James	Fr

Special teams

Pos.	#	Name	Class
K	32	Aidan Ellison	So
K	33	Dominic Zvada	So
K	34	Clune Van Andel	Fr
LS	38	Jack Bullard	Jr
P	42	Magnus Haines	So
P	47	Noah Grant	Jr
LS	48	Lucas Ott	Fr
LS	69	Ethan Johnson	So
P	92	William Przystup	Sr

Head coach

- Butch Jones (Ferris State)

Coordinators/assistant coaches

- Rob Harley (Michigan State)
  Defensive coordinator
- Keith Heckendorf (Nebraska)
  Offensive coordinator/qb
- Marquase Lovings (Mississippi State)
  Running backs
- Josh Conklin (Dakota State)
  Special teams coordinator / Safeties
- Nick Grimes (Sam Houston State)
  Tight ends
- Andy Kwon (Alabama)
  Offensive line
- Derrick Lett (Bowling Green State)
  Wide receivers
- Vinson Reynolds (Northern Illinois)
  Defensive line
- John Shalala (Grand View)
  Linebackers
- Jay Simpson (South Alabama)
  Defensive backs

Legend

- (C) Team captain
- (S) Suspended
- (I) Ineligible
- Injured
- Redshirt

Roster
Last update: 31 August 2023

== Game summaries ==
=== at Oklahoma ===
Arkansas State Red Wolves (0–0) vs. No. 20 Oklahoma Sooners (0–0)

Quarter	1	2	3	4	Total
Arkansas State	0	0	0	0	0
No. 20 Oklahoma	28	17	21	7	73

at Gaylord Family Oklahoma Memorial Stadium • Norman, OK

- Date: Saturday, September 2, 2023
- Game time: 11:00 a.m. CDT
- Game weather: • Sunny Temperature: 83
- Game attendance: 83,221
- Referee: Jonathan Noll
- TV announcers (ESPN): Roy Philpott (play-by-play), Roddy Jones (analyst) & Taylor McGregor (sideline)

Game information

First quarter

- (13:41) OKLA – Drake Stoops 10 yard pass from Dillon Gabriel, Zach Schmit kick (Drive: 5 plays, 70 yards, 1:19; OKLA 7–0)
- (12:38) OKLA – Gavin Freeman 82 yard punt return, Zach Schmit kick (Drive: 0 plays, 82 yards; OKLA 14–0)
- (7:50) OKLA – Marcus Major 2 yard rush, Zach Schmit kick (Drive: 10 plays, 80 yards, 3:34; OKLA 21–0)
- (0:31) OKLA – Gavin Freeman 7 yard pass from Dillon Gabriel, Zach Schmit kick (Drive: 13 plays, 73 yards, 4:23; OKLA 28–0)

Second quarter

- (12:21) OKLA – Tawee Walker 1 yard rush, Zach Schmit kick (Drive: 6 plays, 70 yards, 2:12; OKLA 35–0)
- (8:33) OKLA – Dillon Gabriel 5 yard rush, Zach Schmit kick (Drive: 5 plays, 74 yards, 2:05; OKLA 42–0)
- (0:37) OKLA – Zach Schmit 21 yard Field goal (Drive: 11 plays, 82 yards, 5:53; OKLA 45–0)

Third quarter

- (9:46) OKLA – Tawee Walker 1 yard rush, Zach Schmit kick (Drive: 10 plays, 65 yards, 3:54; OKLA 52–0)
- (6:29) OKLA – Jayden Gibson 21 yard pass from Jackson Arnold, Zach Schmit kick (Drive: 4 plays, 62 yards, 1:34; OKLA 59–0)
- (3:45) OKLA – Jackson Arnold 7 yard rush, Gavin Marshall kick (Drive: 5 plays, 34 yards, 2:27; OKLA 66–0)

Fourth quarter

- (9:43) OKLA – Kalib Hicks 6 yard rush, Gavin Marshall kick (Drive: 11 plays, 67 yards, 7:22; OKLA 73–0)

Statistics	ASU	OKLA
First downs	10	36
Total yards	208	642
Rushes/yards	23/48	49/220
Passing yards	160	422
Passing: Comp–Att–Int	13–27	30–33
Time of possession	23:04	36:56

Team	Category	Player	Statistics
Arkansas State	Passing	J. T. Shrout	12/26, 148 yards
Arkansas State	Rushing	Jaxon Dailey	3 carries, 11 yards
Arkansas State	Receiving	Courtney Jackson	3 receptions, 66 yards
Oklahoma	Passing	Dillon Gabriel	19/22, 308 yards, 2 TD's
Oklahoma	Rushing	Jovantae Barnes	13 carries, 49 yards
Oklahoma	Receiving	Jaquaize Pettaway	9 receptions, 56 yards

=== Memphis ===
Memphis Tigers (1–0) vs Arkansas State Red Wolves (0–1) – Game summary

Quarter	1	2	3	4	Total
Tigers	3	21	7	6	37
Red Wolves	0	3	0	0	3

at Centennial Bank Stadium • Jonesboro, Arkansas

- Date: September 9
- Game time: 6:00 p.m. CDT
- Game weather: Sunny • Temperature: 79 °F (26 °C) • Wind: NE at 10 miles per hour (16 km/h)
- Game attendance: 18,724
- Referee: Scott Hardin
- TV announcers (ESPN+): Roger Twibell (play-by-play), Pete Cordelli (analyst), Darrell Greene (sideline reporter)

Game information

First quarter

- (5:53) MEM – Seth Morgan 47 yard field goal (Drive: 13 plays, 53 yards, 5:27; Memphis 3–0)

Second quarter

- (8:20) MEM – Joe Scates 4 yard pass from Seth Henigan, Seth Morgan kick (Drive: 9 plays, 44 yards, 5:05; Memphis 10–0)
- (7:34) MEM – DJ Bell 36 yard interception return, Seth Morgan kick (Memphis 17–0)
- (3:34) MEM – Tauskie Dove 52 yard pass from Seth Henigan, Seth Morgan kick (Drive: 4 plays, 72 yards, 1:38; Memphis 24–0)
- (0:04) ARST – Dominic Zvada 34 yard field goal (Drive: 14 plays, 58 yards, 3:30; Memphis 24–3)

Third quarter

- (8:51) MEM – Seth Henigan 7 yard run, Seth Morgan kick (Drive: 10 plays, 54 yards, 4:31; Memphis 31–3)

Fourth quarter

- (0:00) MEM – Ke’Travion Hargrove 17 yard run (Drive: 4 plays, 24 yards, 2:22; Memphis 37–3)

Statistics	Memphis	Arkansas State
First downs	18	18
Plays–yards	70–389	71–230
Rushes–yards	41–150	30–64
Passing yards	239	166
Passing: comp–att–int	21–29–0	22–41–2
Turnovers		
Time of possession	35:32	24:28

Team	Category	Player	Statistics
Memphis	Passing	Seth Henigan	21/29, 239 yards, 2 TD
Memphis	Rushing	Blake Watson	20 carries, 51 yards
Memphis	Receiving	Tauskie Dove	1 reception, 52 yards, 1 TD
Arkansas State	Passing	J. T. Shrout	12/25, 79 yards, 2 INT
Arkansas State	Rushing	Ja'Quez Cross	9 carries, 57 yards
Arkansas State	Receiving	Corey Rucker	3 receptions, 40 yards

=== Stony Brook ===
	1	2	3	4	Total
Seawolves	0	0	0	7	7
Red Wolves	17	0	7	7	31

=== Southern Miss ===
Game Four – Southern Miss Golden Eagles (1–2) at Arkansas State Red Wolves (1–2) – Game summary

Quarter	1	2	3	4	Total
Golden Eagles	7	10	10	10	37
Red Wolves	14	6	14	10	44

at Centennial Bank Stadium, Jonesboro, AR

- Date: Saturday, September 23, 2023
- Game time: 6:00 p.m. CDT
- Game weather: Sunny
- Game attendance: 16,601
- Referee: Scott Broadway
- TV announcers (ESPN+): TBD

Game information

First quarter

- (9:10) USM - Frank Gore Jr. 2-yard run, Andrew Stein kick (Drive: 12 plays, 84 yards, 5:42; USM 7-0)
- (6:03) ASU - Jeff Foreman 33-yard pass from Jaylen Raynor, Dominic Zvada kick (Drive: 7 plays, 78 yards, 3:01; Tied 7-7)
- (3:40) ASU - Courtney Jackson 5-yard pass from Jaylen Raynor, Dominic Zvada kick (Drive: 3 plays, 8 yards, 1:22; ASU 14-7)

Second quarter

- (14:51) ASU - Dominic Zvada 36-yard field goal (Drive: 4 plays, 7 yards: 1:21; ASU 17-7)
- (11:06) USM - Latreal Jones 28-yard pass from Billy Wiles, Andrew Stein kick (Drive: 7 plays, 65 yards, 3:39; ASU 17-14)
- (10:13) ASU - Dominic Zvada 53-yard field goal (Drive: 4 plays, 3 yards, 0:53; ASU 20-14)
- (6:23) USM - Andrew Stein 23-yard field goal (Drive: 9 plays, 51 yards, 3:41; ASU 20-17)

Third quarter

- (14:46) ASU - Courtney Jackson 60-yard pass from Jaylen Raynor, Dominic Zvada kick (Drive: 1 play, 60 yards, 0:09; ASU 27-17)
- (9:47) ASU - Jaylen Raynor 8-yard run, Dominic Zvada kick (Drive: 6 plays, 89 yards, 2:36; ASU 34-17)
- (6:28) USM - Rodrigues Clark 59-yard run, Andrew Stein kick (Drive: 6 plays, 75 yards, 3:19; ASU 34-24)
- (3:10) USM - Andrew Stein 42-yard field goal (Drive: 6 plays, 38 yards, 1:50; ASU 34-27)

Fourth quarter

- (14:00) USM - Jakarius Caston 22-yard pass from Billy Wiles, Andrew Stein kick (Drive: 3 plays, 50 yards, 0:37; Tied 34-34)
- (3:50) ASU - Dominic Zvada 21-yard field goal (Drive: 8 plays, 51 yards, 4:00; ASU 37-34)
- (2:28) ASU - Jaylen Raynor 62-yard run, Dominic Zvada kick (Drive: 2 plays, 64 yards, 0:14; ASU 44-34)
- (0:16) USM - Andrew Stein 37-yard field goal (Drive: 10 plays, 46 yards, 2:11; ASU 44-37)

Statistics	USM	ASU
First downs	20	18
Total yards	449	425
Rushing yards	234	192
Passing yards	215	233
Turnovers	2	1
Time of possession	30:28	29:32

Team	Category	Player	Statistics
Southern Miss	Passing	Billy Wiles	20/36, 215 yards, 2 TD, 2 INT
Southern Miss	Rushing	Frank Gore Jr.	20 carries, 132 yards, 1 TD
Southern Miss	Receiving	Jakarius Caston	4 receptions, 65 yards, 1 TD
Arkansas State	Passing	Jaylen Raynor	11/21, 233 yards, 3 TD, 1 INT
Arkansas State	Rushing	Jaylen Raynor	17 carries, 97 yards, 2 TD
Arkansas State	Receiving	Courtney Jackson	3 receptions, 94 yards, 2 TD

=== at UMass ===
	1	2	3	4	Total
Red Wolves	17	14	14	7	52
Minutemen	0	10	10	8	28

=== at Troy ===
	1	2	3	4	Total
Red Wolves	0	0	0	3	3
Trojans	7	13	3	14	37

=== Coastal Carolina ===
	1	2	3	4	Total
Chanticleers	3	14	0	10	27
Red Wolves	0	3	7	7	17

=== at Louisiana–Monroe ===
	1	2	3	4	Total
Red Wolves	7	3	7	17	34
Warhawks	3	6	7	8	24

=== Louisiana ===
	1	2	3	4	Total
Ragin' Cajuns	7	3	7	0	17
Red Wolves	14	6	7	10	37

Statistics	Louisiana	Arkansas State
First downs	20	26
Total yards	327	426
Rushing yards	64	232
Passing yards	263	194
Turnovers	2	0
Time of possession	25:07	34:53

Team	Category	Player	Statistics
Louisiana	Passing	Zeon Chriss	12/17, 171 yards, 1 TD
Louisiana	Rushing	Dre'lyn Washington	23 carries, 119 yards, 1 TD
Louisiana	Receiving	Peter LeBlanc	6 receptions, 129 yards, 1 TD
Arkansas State	Passing	Jaylen Raynor	18/28, 194 yards
Arkansas State	Rushing	Zak Wallace	15 carries, 88 yards, 1 TD
Arkansas State	Receiving	Ja'Quez Cross	6 receptions, 66 yards

=== at South Alabama ===
Arkansas State Red Wolves (5–4) at South Alabama Jaguars (4–5)

Quarter	1	2	3	4	Total
Red Wolves	3	0	3	8	14
Jaguars	7	7	7	0	21

at Hancock Whitney Stadium, Mobile, AL

- Date: November 11, 2023
- Game time: 4:00 p.m. CDT
- Game weather: Cloudy • Temperature: 69 °F (21 °C) • Wind: S 7 mph
- Game attendance: 15,242
- Referee: Tedd Pitts
- TV announcers (ESPN+): Pat Greenwood (play-by-play) and Charlie Harrison (analyst)

Game information

First Quarter

- (9:18) ASU – Dominic Zvada 36-yard field goal (Drive: 10 plays, 53 yards, 4:11; Arkansas State 3–0)
- (7:21) USA – La'Damian Webb 13-yard run, Diego Guajardo kick (Drive: 4 plays, 75 yards, 1:57; South Alabama 7–3)

Second Quarter

- (0:07) USA – Jamaal Pritchett 20-yard pass from Carter Bradley, Diego Guajardo kick (Drive: 14 plays, 78 yards, 5:44; South Alabama 14–3)

Third Quarter

- (12:55) ASU – Dominic Zvada 44-yard field goal (Drive: 6 plays, 49 yards, 2:05; South Alabama 14–6)

Fourth Quarter

- (8:01) USA – Jamaal Pritchett 24-yard pass from Carter Bradley, Diego Guajardo kick (Drive: 8 plays, 53 yards, 4:40; South Alabama 21–6)
- (3:39) ASU – Jeff Foreman 46-yard pass from Jaylen Raynor, Jaylen Raynor rush (Drive: 7 plays, 81 yards, 2:15; South Alabama 21–14)

Win Probability

Line

Over/Under

Statistics	ARST	USA
First downs	19	15
Total yards	302	344
Rushing yards	116	199
Passing yards	186	145
Passing: Comp–Att–Int	15–28–1	19–25–0
Time of possession	27:08	32:52

Team	Category	Player	Statistics
Arkansas State	Passing	Jaylen Raynor	15/28, 186 yards, TD, INT
Arkansas State	Rushing	Zak Wallace	11 carries, 56 yards
Arkansas State	Receiving	Jeff Foreman	3 receptions, 61 yards, TD
South Alabama	Passing	Carter Bradley	19/25, 145 yards, 2 TD
South Alabama	Rushing	La'Damian Webb	28 carries, 163 yards, TD
South Alabama	Receiving	Caullin Lacy	7 receptions, 50 yards

=== Texas State ===
Texas State Bobcats at Arkansas State Red Wolves – Game summary

Quarter	1	2	3	4	Total
Bobcats	10	7	7	7	31
Red Wolves	14	21	28	14	77

at Centennial Bank Stadium, Jonesboro, Arkansas

- Date: November 18
- Game time: 2:00 p.m. CST
- Game weather: Sunny, 59 °F (15 °C)
- Game attendance: 16,721
- Referee: Scott Broadway
- TV announcers (ESPN+): Roger Twibell, Pete Cordelli, and Darrell Greene

Game information
First quarter
- TXST – Ismail Mahdi 4-yard run (Mason Shipley kick), 10:17. Bobcats 7–0. Drive: 11 plays, 65 yards, 4:43.
- ARST – Zak Wallace 41-yard run (Dominic Zvada kick), 8:45. Tied 7–7. Drive: 4 plays, 50 yards, 1:23.
- TXST – Mason Shipley 43-yard field goal, 6:50. Bobcats 10–7. Drive: 6 plays, 53 yards, 1:50.
- ARST – Zak Wallace 8-yard run (Dominic Zvada kick), 2:03. Red Wolves 14–10. Drive: 12 plays, 81 yards, 4:41.

Second quarter

- TXST – Joey Hobert 18-yard pass from T. J. Finley (Mason Shipley kick), 12:16. Bobcats 17–14. Drive: 6 plays, 76 yards, 1:57.
- ARST – Ja'Quez Cross 42-yard run (Dominic Zvada kick), 9:14. Red Wolves 21–17. Drive: 7 plays, 75 yards, 3:02.
- ARST – Ja'Quez Cross 15-yard run (Dominic Zvada kick), 4:01. Red Wolves 28–17. Drive: 1 play, 15 yards, 0:04.
- ARST – Ja'Quez Cross 57-yard run (Dominic Zvada kick), 1:52. Red Wolves 35–17. Drive: 3 plays, 67 yards, 0:53.

Third quarter

- ARST – Cedric Hawkins 9-yard run (Dominic Zvada kick), 12:39. Red Wolves 42–17. Drive: 6 plays, 55 yards, 2:16.
- ARST – Cedric Hawkins 7-yard run (Dominic Zvada kick), 8:20. Red Wolves 49–17. Drive: 7 plays, 80 yards, 2:33.
- ARST – Trevian Thomas 91-yard fumble return (Dominic Zvada kick), 5:57. Red Wolves 56–17.
- TXST – Kole Wilson 7-yard pass from T. J. Finley (Mason Shipley kick), 0:12. Red Wolves 56–24. Drive: 14 plays, 75 yards, 5:45.
- ARST – Ja'Quez Cross 93-yard kickoff return (Dominic Zvada kick), 0:00. Red Wolves 63–24.

Fourth quarter

- ARST – Melique Straker 87-yard interception return (Dominic Zvada kick), 12:20. Red Wolves 70–24.
- ARST – Dane Motley 50-yard interception return (Dominic Zvada kick), 10:39. Red Wolves 77–24.
- TXST – Kole Wilson 3-yard pass from T. J. Finley (Mason Shipley kick), 6:19. Red Wolves 77–31. Drive: 10 plays, 75 yards, 4:20.

Statistics	TXST	ARST
First downs	32	23
Total yards	539	487
Rushing yards	173	291
Passing yards	366	196
Turnovers	4	0
Time of possession	34:06	25:54

Team	Category	Player	Statistics
Texas State	Passing	T. J. Finley	37/55, 366 yards, 3 TD, 2 INT
Texas State	Rushing	Donerio Davenport	14 rushes, 76 yards
Texas State	Receiving	Ashtyn Hawkins	8 receptions, 165 yards
Arkansas State	Passing	Jaylen Raynor	14/17, 196 yards
Arkansas State	Rushing	Ja'Quez Cross	13 rushes, 139 yards, 3 TD
Arkansas State	Receiving	Courtney Jackson	7 receptions, 107 yards

=== at Marshall ===
Game Twelve – Arkansas State Red Wolves (6–5) at Marshall Thundering Herd (5–6)

Quarter	1	2	3	4	Total
Red Wolves	0	7	7	7	21
Thundering Herd	14	14	7	0	35

at Joan C. Edwards Stadium • Huntington, West Virginia

- Date: Saturday, November 25, 2023
- Game time: 3:30 p.m. EDT
- Game weather: Sunny
- Game attendance: 18,673
- Referee: Jeremy Parker
- TV: ESPN+

Game information

First quarter

- (8:05) MRSH – Chuck Montgomery 9 yard pass from Cam Fancher, Rece Verhoff kick (Drive: 4 plays, 70 yards, 1:32; Marshall 7–0)
- (1:28) MRSH – Chuck Montgomery 15 yard pass from Cam Fancher, Rece Verhoff kick (Drive: 10 plays, 74 yards, 4:35; Marshall 14–0)

Second quarter

- (11:31) MRSH – Cam Fancher 7 yard run, Rece Verhoff kick (Drive: 4 plays, 99 yards, 1:31; Marshall 21–0)
- (6:15) MRSH – Caleb McMillan 21 yard pass from Cam Fancher, Rece Verhoff kick (Drive: 6 plays, 33 yards, 3:23; Marshall 28–0)
- (1:19) ARST – Ja'Quez Cross 3 yard run, Dominic Zvada kick (Drive: 6 plays, 62 yards, 1:12; Marshall 28–7)

Third quarter

- (6:58) MRSH – Cam Fancher 3 yard run, Rece Verhoff kick (Drive: 2 plays, 67 yards, 0:35; Marshall 35–7)
- (2:50) ARST – Courtney Jackson 60 yard punt return, Dominic Zvada kick (Marshall 35–14)

Fourth quarter

- (2:54) ARST – Courtney Jackson 2 yard pass from Jaylen Raynor, Dominic Zvada kick (Drive: 2 plays, 15 yards, 0:07; Marshall 35–21)

Statistics	ARST	MRSH
First downs	20	23
Plays–yards	67–305	75–493
Rushes–yards	29–42	53–279
Passing yards	263	214
Passing: comp–att–int	19–38–1	16–22–0
Turnovers		
Time of possession	23:04	36:56

Team	Category	Player	Statistics
Arkansas State	Passing	Jaylen Raynor	19/38, 263 yards, 1 TD, 1 INT
Arkansas State	Rushing	Ja'Quez Cross	11 carries, 27 yards, 1 TD
Arkansas State	Receiving	Corey Rucker	5 receptions, 87 yards
Marshall	Passing	Cam Fancher	16/22, 214 yards, 3 TD
Marshall	Rushing	Ethan Payne	19 carries, 113 yards
Marshall	Receiving	Chuck Montgomery	4 receptions, 51 yards, 2 TD

=== vs. Northern Illinois (Camellia Bowl) ===
2023 Camellia Bowl

Quarter	1	2	3	4	Total
Arkansas State	7	6	0	6	19
Northern Illinois	13	8	0	0	21

at Cramton Bowl • Montgomery, Alabama

- Date: Saturday, December 23, 2023
- Game time: 11:00 a.m. CST
- Game weather: Sunny • Temperature: 61 °F (16 °C) • Wind: 3 mph (4.8 km/h) SW
- Game attendance: 11,310
- Referee: Kevin Randall
- TV announcers (ESPN): Courtney Lyle (play-by-play), Hutson Mason (analyst), and Ashley Stroehlein (sideline)
- Box score

Game information

First Quarter

- (9:09) NIU – Grayson Barnes 18 yard pass from Rocky Lombardi, two-point run conversion failed (Drive: 10 plays, 75 yards, 5:51; Northern Illinois 6–0)
- (5:59) ARKST – Corey Rucker 42 yard pass from Jaylen Raynor, Dominic Zvada kick (Drive: 1 play, 42 yards, 0:08; Arkansas State 7–6)
- (1:24) NIU – Rocky Lombardi 6 yard run, Kanon Woodill kick (Drive: 9 plays, 75 yards, 4:35; Northern Illinois 13–7)

Second Quarter

- (9:42) NIU – Kanon Woodill 32 yard pass from Tom Foley, Trayvon Rudolph two-point pass conversion from Rocky Lombardi (Drive: 8 plays, 87 yards, 4:03; Northern Illinois 21–7)
- (6:30) ARKST – Dominic Zvada 28 yard field goal (Drive: 11 plays, 65 yards, 3:12; Northern Illinois 21–10)
- (0:01) ARKST – Dominic Zvada 45 yard field goal (Drive: 5 plays, 31 yards, 0:25; Northern Illinois 21–13)

Third Quarter

No scoring

Fourth Quarter

- (1:14) ARKST – Corey Rucker 13 yard pass from Jaylen Raynor, two-point pass conversion failed (Drive: 8 plays, 86 yards, 2:38; Northern Illinois 21–19)

Statistics	ASU	NIU
First downs	18	26
Plays–yards	57–351	72–421
Rushes–yards	27–101	42–189
Passing yards	250	232
Passing: comp–att–int	16–30–1	19–30–2
Turnovers		
Time of possession	19:39	40:21

Team	Category	Player	Statistics
Arkansas State	Passing	Jaylen Raynor	16/30, 250 yards, 2 TD, INT
Arkansas State	Rushing	Jaylen Raynor	13 carries, 49 yards
Arkansas State	Receiving	Corey Rucker	5 receptions, 107 yards, 2 TD
Northern Illinois	Passing	Rocky Lombardi	18/29, 200 yards, TD, 2 INT
Northern Illinois	Rushing	Antario Brown	25 carries, 132 yards
Northern Illinois	Receiving	Grayson Barnes	5 receptions, 105 yards, TD
