= 2022 Arkansas State Red Wolves football team =

American college football season

2022 Arkansas State Red Wolves football
- Conference: Sun Belt Conference
- West Division
- Record: 3–9 (1–7 Sun Belt)
- Head coach: Butch Jones (2nd season)
- Offensive coordinator: Keith Heckendorf (4th season)
- Offensive scheme: Power spread
- Defensive coordinator: Rob Harley (2nd season)
- Base defense: 4–3
- Home stadium: Centennial Bank Stadium

2022 Sun Belt Conference football standings
	Conf.			Overall
Team	W		L	W		L
East Division
James Madison* x	6	–	2	8	–	3
Coastal Carolina xy	6	–	2	9	–	4
Marshall	5	–	3	9	–	4
Georgia Southern	3	–	5	6	–	7
Appalachian State	3	–	5	6	–	6
Georgia State	3	–	5	4	–	8
Old Dominion	2	–	6	3	–	9
West Division
No. 19 Troy xy$	7	–	1	12	–	2
South Alabama x	7	–	1	10	–	3
Southern Miss	4	–	4	7	–	6
Louisiana	4	–	4	6	–	7
Louisiana–Monroe	3	–	5	4	–	8
Texas State	2	–	6	4	–	8
Arkansas State	1	–	7	3	–	9
Championship: Troy 45, Coastal Carolina 26
$ – Conference champion; x – Division champion/co-champions; y – Championship game participant; * – Ineligible for postseason play due to FCS-to-FBS transition rules; Rankings from AP Poll

The 2022 Arkansas State Red Wolves football team represented the Arkansas State University as a member of West Division of the Sun Belt Conference during the 2022 NCAA Division I FBS football season. Led by second-year head coach Butch Jones, the Red Wolves compiled an overall record of 3–9 (1–7 in conference play), placing last out of seven teams in the Sun Belt's West Division. Arkansas State played home games at Centennial Bank Stadium in Jonesboro, Arkansas.

== Schedule ==
Arkansas State and the Sun Belt Conference announced the 2022 football schedule on March 1, 2022.

Date	Time	Opponent	Site	TV	Result	Attendance
September 3	6:00 p.m.	Grambling State*	Centennial Bank Stadium; Jonesboro, AR	ESPN3	W 58–3	17,893
September 10	11:00 a.m.	at No. 3 Ohio State*	Ohio Stadium; Columbus, OH	BTN	L 12–45	100,067
September 17	6:00 p.m.	at Memphis*	Liberty Bowl Memorial Stadium; Memphis, TN (Paint Bucket Bowl)	ESPN+	L 32–44	32,620
September 24	5:00 p.m.	at Old Dominion	S.B. Ballard Stadium; Norfolk, VA	ESPN+	L 26–29	20,655
October 1	6:00 p.m.	Louisiana–Monroe^{†}	Centennial Bank Stadium; Jonesboro, AR	ESPN+	W 45–28	18,172
October 8	6:00 p.m.	James Madison	Centennial Bank Stadium; Jonesboro, AR	NFLN	L 20–42	20,083
October 15	6:00 p.m.	at Southern Miss	M. M. Roberts Stadium; Hattiesburg, MS	ESPN+	L 19–20	27,042
October 22	4:00 p.m.	at Louisiana	Cajun Field; Lafayette, LA	ESPN+	L 18–38	15,017
October 29	3:00 p.m.	South Alabama	Centennial Bank Stadium; Jonesboro, AR	ESPNU	L 3–31	11,714
November 12	2:00 p.m.	UMass*	Centennial Bank Stadium; Jonesboro, AR	ESPN3	W 35–33	14,354
November 19	4:00 p.m.	at Texas State	Bobcat Stadium; San Marcos, TX	ESPN3	L 13–16	13,287
November 26	2:30 p.m.	Troy	Centennial Bank Stadium; Jonesboro, AR	ESPNU	L 19–48	9,376
*Non-conference game; ^{†}Homecoming; Rankings from AP Poll (and CFP Rankings, after November 1) – Released prior to game; All times are in Central time

== Preseason ==
=== Sun Belt coaches poll ===
The Sun Belt coaches poll was released on July 25, 2022. The Red Wolves were picked to finish sixth in the West Division.

=== Sun Belt Preseason All-Conference teams ===
Offense

2nd team

- Te'Vailance Hunt – Wide Receiver, SR

Defense

1st team

- Kivon Bennett – Linebacker, RS-SR

Special teams

1st team

- Johnnie Lang – Right Safety, RS-SR

== Game summaries ==
=== Grambling State ===
	1	2	3	4	Total
Tigers	0	0	3	0	3
Red Wolves	16	14	21	7	58

=== At No. 3 Ohio State ===
No. 3 Ohio State Buckeyes (1-0) vs Arkansas State Red Wolves (1-0) – Game summary

Quarter	1	2	3	4	Total
Arkansas State	3	6	3	0	12
No. 3 Ohio State	14	10	21	0	45

at Ohio Stadium, Columbus, Ohio

- Date: September 10
- Game time: 12:00 p.m. EDT
- Game weather: Cloudy, 75 °F (24 °C)
- Game attendance: 100,067
- Referee: David Siegle
- TV announcers (BTN): Mark Followill (play-by-play), Joshua Perry (analyst), and Michelle McMahon (sideline reporter)
- Spread: Ohio State −44.5 • Odds to win: Ohio State 98.4% •

Game information

First quarter

- 10:04 OSU - Marvin Harrison Jr. from C. J. Stroud for a 42-yard TD (Noah Ruggles kick) - Ohio State 7-0, Drive: 8 plays, 96 yards, 3:30
- 5:56 ASU - Dominic Zvada kicks a 30-yard field goal - Ohio State 7-3, Drive: 11 plays, 56 yards, 4:03
- 4:23 OSU - TreVeyon Henderson runs for a 4-yard TD (Noah Ruggles kick) - Ohio State 14-3 Drive: 4 plays, 75 yards, 1:33

Second quarter

- 14:56 OSU - Noah Ruggles kicks a 24-yard field goal - Ohio State 17-3, Drive: 8 plays, 71 yards, 2:51
- 13:33 ASU - Dominic Zvada kicks a 38-yard field goal - Ohio State 17-6, Drive: 5 plays, 50 yards, 1:15
- 5:22 ASU - Dominic Zvada kicks a 34-yard field goal - Ohio State 17-9, Drive: 14 plays, 58 yards, 6:53
- 4:24 OSU - Marvin Harrison Jr. from C. J. Stroud for a 42-yard TD (Noah Ruggles kick) - Ohio State 24-9, Drive: 3 plays, 75 yards, 0:58

Third quarter

- 13:40 OSU - TreVeyon Henderson runs for a 23-yard TD (Noah Ruggles kick) - Ohio State 31-9, Drive: 3 plays, 75 yards, 1:20
- 10:30 OSU - Emeka Egbuka from C. J. Stroud for a 51-yard TD (Noah Ruggles kick) - Ohio State 38-9, Drive: 2 plays, 59 yards, 0:42
- 2:49 ASU - Dominic Zvada kicks a 45-yard field goal - Ohio State 38-12, Drive: 10 plays, 43 yards, 4:46
- 0:04 OSU - Marvin Harrison Jr. from C. J. Stroud for a 30-yard TD (Noah Ruggles kick) - Ohio State 45-12, Drive: 7 plays, 75 yards, 2:45

Fourth quarter

- No scoring

Statistics	Arkansas State	No. 3 Ohio State
First downs	15	20
Plays–yards	76–276	54–538
Rushes–yards	34–53	26–168
Passing yards	223	370
Passing: comp–att–int	25–42–0	19–28–0
Turnovers		
Time of possession	37:44	22:16

Team	Category	Player	Statistics
Arkansas State	Passing	James Blackman	20-34, 188 yards
Arkansas State	Rushing	Champ Flemings	2 carries, 20 yards
Arkansas State	Receiving	Champ Flemings	10 receptions, 105 yards
No. 3 Ohio State	Passing	C. J. Stroud	16-24, 351 yards, 4 TDs
No. 3 Ohio State	Rushing	TreVeyon Henderson	10 carries, 87 yards, 2 TDs
No. 3 Ohio State	Receiving	Marvin Harrison Jr.	7 receptions, 184 yards, 3 TDs

=== At Memphis ===
Arkansas State Red Wolves (1-1) vs Memphis Tigers (1-1)

Quarter	1	2	3	4	Total
Red Wolves	7	10	0	15	32
Tigers	7	14	0	23	44

at Simmons Bank Liberty Stadium, Memphis, TN

- Date: September 17th
- Game time: 7:00
- Game weather: 87 °F (31 °C) • Weather: Sunny • Wind: SE 4 MPH
- Game attendance: 32,620
- Referee: Wayne Winkler
- TV announcers (ESPN+): Richard Cross (play-by-play) & Leger Douzable (analyst)

Statistics	Arkansas State	Memphis
First downs	22	25
Plays–yards	66–370	73–547
Rushes–yards	32–95	45–187
Passing yards	275	360
Passing: comp–att–int	25–34–0	19–28–0
Turnovers		
Time of possession	29:51	30:09

Team	Category	Player	Statistics
Arkansas State	Passing	James Blackman	25/34, 275 yards, 2 TD
Arkansas State	Rushing	Brian Snead	13 carries, 66 yards, 2 TD
Arkansas State	Receiving	Seydou Traore	6 receptions, 120 yards, 1 TD
Memphis	Passing	Seth Henigan	19/28, 360 yards, 3 TD
Memphis	Rushing	Jevyon Ducker	10 carries, 76 yards, 1 TD
Memphis	Receiving	Gabriel Rogers	5 receptions, 86 yards

Scoring summary

Quarter	Time	Drive			Team	Scoring information	Score	
Quarter	Time	Plays	Yards	TOP	Team	Scoring information	Arkansas State	Memphis
							0	0
"TOP" = time of possession. For other American football terms, see Glossary of American football.							0	0

=== At Old Dominion ===
	1	2	3	4	Total
Red Wolves	0	12	7	7	26
Monarchs	0	0	21	8	29

Statistics

Statistics	ASU	ODU
First downs	22	12
Total yards	397	330
Rushing yards	112	51
Passing yards	285	279
Turnovers	2	0
Time of possession	38:16	21:44

Team	Category	Player	Statistics
Arkansas State	Passing	James Blackman	23/35, 285 yards, TD, INT
Arkansas State	Rushing	AJ Mayer	7 rushes, 46 yards, TD
Arkansas State	Receiving	Jeff Foreman	4 receptions, 115 yards, TD
Old Dominion	Passing	Hayden Wolff	19/32, 279 yards, 2 TD
Old Dominion	Rushing	Keshawn Wicks	9 rushes, 36 yards, TD
Old Dominion	Receiving	Ali Jennings III	4 receptions, 140 yards, TD

=== Louisiana-Monroe ===
	1	2	3	4	Total
Warhawks	7	7	7	7	28
Red Wolves	10	14	14	7	45

=== James Madison ===
	1	2	3	4	Total
Dukes	0	14	7	21	42
Red Wolves	0	3	10	7	20

=== At Southern Miss ===
	1	2	3	4	Total
Red Wolves	7	3	9	0	19
Golden Eagles	0	7	0	13	20

=== At Louisiana ===
Arkansas State at Louisiana

Team	1	2	3	4	Total
Red Wolves	0	9	3	6	18
• Ragin' Cajuns	10	14	14	0	38

- Date: October 22, 2022
- Location: Cajun Field
  Lafayette, Louisiana
- Game start: 4:03 p.m. CDT
- Elapsed time: 3 hours and 31 minutes
- Game attendance: 15,017
- Game weather: 80 °F (27 °C) • Weather: Sunny • Wind: S 14 MPH
- Referee: Jeremy Parker
- TV announcers (ESPN+): Dan McDonald (play–by–play) and Eric Mouton (analyst)

Scoring summary
1	04:50	LA	Kenneth Almendares 43-yard field goal (12 plays, 49 yards, 4:05)	LA 3–0
1	00:13	LA	Dontae Fleming 7-yard pass from Ben Wooldridge (Kenneth Almendares kick) (9 plays, 53 yards, 3:49)	LA 10–0
2	08:58	ARST	Dominic Zvada 43-yard field goal (5 plays, 35 yards, 1:25)	LA 10–3
2	06:28	ARST	Seydou Traore 27-yard pass from AJ Mayer (Dominic Zvada PAT blocked) (3 plays, 85 yards, 1:11)	LA 10–9
2	04:36	LA	Jacob Bernard 45-yard pass from Ben Wooldridge (Kenneth Almendares kick) (7 plays, 75 yards, 1:52)	LA 17–9
2	01:14	LA	Dontae Fleming 55-yard pass from Ben Wooldridge (Kenneth Almendares kick) (4 plays, 86 yards, 1:26)	LA 24–9
3	11:34	LA	Michael Jefferson 36-yard pass from Ben Wooldridge (Kenneth Almendares kick) (9 plays, 75 yards, 3:26)	LA 31–9
3	06:57	LA	Neal Anderson 13-yard pass from Ben Wooldridge (Kenneth Almendares kick) (7 plays, 49 yards, 3:39)	LA 38–9
3	01:59	ARST	Dominic Zvada 33-yard field goal (11 plays, 61 yards, 4:52)	LA 38–12
4	02:02	ARST	Dane Motley 12-yard fumble returned (Two-Point conversion attempt failed) (3 plays, -8 yards, 1:31)	LA 38–18

Statistics	Arkansas State	Louisiana
First downs	13	27
Total yards	271	522
Rushing yards	82	206
Passing yards	189	316
Turnovers	1	2
Time of possession	22:12	37:48

Team	Category	Player	Statistics
Arkansas State	Passing	AJ Mayer	8/23, 155 yards, 1 TD, 1 INT
Arkansas State	Rushing	Ja'Quez Cross	6 carries, 33 yards
Arkansas State	Receiving	Daverrick Jenkins	3 receptions, 61 yards
Louisiana	Passing	Ben Wooldridge	21/34, 316 yards, 5 TD
Louisiana	Rushing	Terrence Williams	11 carries, 58 yards
Louisiana	Receiving	Jacob Bernard	5 receptions, 97 yards, 1 TD

=== South Alabama ===
South Alabama Jaguars (5–2) at Arkansas State Red Wolves (2–6)

Quarter	1	2	3	4	Total
Jaguars	14	2	8	7	31
Red Wolves	3	0	0	0	3

at Centennial Bank Stadium, Jonesboro, AR

- Date: October 29, 2022
- Game time: 3:00 p.m. CDT
- Game weather: Cloudy Temperature: 70°F Wind: NE 18 mph
- Game attendance: 11,714
- Referee: Trennis Livingston
- TV announcers (ESPNU): Kevin Brown (play-by-play) and Hutson Mason (analyst)

Game information

First Quarter
Second Quarter
Third Quarter
Fourth Quarter

Win Probability

Line

Over/Under

Statistics	USA	ARST
First downs	16	9
Total yards	362	158
Rushing yards	183	–19
Passing yards	179	177
Passing: comp–att–int	17–24–0	22–39–0
Time of possession	35:59	24:01

Team	Category	Player	Statistics
South Alabama	Passing	Carter Bradley	17/24, 179 yards, TD
South Alabama	Rushing	La'Damian Webb	28 carries, 162 yards, 3 TD
South Alabama	Receiving	Jalen Wayne	3 receptions, 83 yards, TD
Arkansas State	Passing	James Blackman	22/39, 177 yards
Arkansas State	Rushing	Marcel Murray	4 carries, 15 yards
Arkansas State	Receiving	Jeff Foreman	6 receptions, 98 yards

=== UMass ===
	1	2	3	4	Total
Minutemen	3	3	13	14	33
Red Wolves	14	0	21	0	35

=== At Texas State ===
	1	2	3	4	Total
Red Wolves	0	7	3	3	13
Bobcats	3	0	0	13	16

Statistics	TXST	ARST
First downs	14	19
Total yards	291	340
Rushing yards	54	144
Passing yards	237	196
Turnovers	0	0
Time of possession	25:57	34:03

Team	Category	Player	Statistics
Texas State	Passing	Layne Hatcher	23/36, 196 yards
Texas State	Rushing	Lincoln Pare	19 carries, 75 yards, TD
Texas State	Receiving	Donovan Moorer	6 receptions, 54 yards
Arkansas State	Passing	James Blackman	22/40, 237 yards, TD
Arkansas State	Rushing	Johnnie Lang	13 carries, 36 yards
Arkansas State	Receiving	Daverrick Jenkins	3 receptions, 56 yards

=== Troy ===
	1	2	3	4	Total
Trojans	7	0	7	34	48
Red Wolves	3	10	6	0	19

== Roster ==
2022 Arkansas State Red Wolves football team roster
Players
Coaches
Offense

Pos.	#	Name	Class
WR	0	Daverrick Jenkins	Fr
QB	1	James Blackman	Sr
RB	2	Johnnie Lang	Sr
RB	4	Brian Snead	Jr
RB	5	Ja'Quez Cross	Fr
QB	6	Wyatt Begeal	Fr
WR	7	Champ Flemings	Sr
WR	8	Khyheem Waleed	So
WR	10	Te'Vailance Hunt	Sr
WR	11	Adam Jones	So
TE	12	Emmanual Stevenson	So
TE	13	Miller McCrumby	Fr
WR	14	Jeff Foreman	Jr
QB	15	Jaxon Dailey	Fr
QB	17	AJ Mayer	Jr
TE	18	Seydou Traore	So
RB	20	Mike Sharpe II	Fr
WR	23	Marquis Harris	Fr
RB	24	Bobby McMillian	Fr
WR	25	Jaden Milliner	Fr
WR	26	CJ Cage	Fr
WR	28	Reagan Ealy	So
WR	29	Brody McKinnon	Fr
WR	30	Will Whaley	Fr
RB	34	Marcel Murray	Jr
RB	35	Torrance Farmer	So
RB	36	Ay'Jon Green	So
RB	37	Tyler Williams	Fr
WR	39	Cameron Harris	Fr
OL	50	Austin Woods	Fr
OL	55	Aleric Watson	Fr
OL	57	Robert Holmes	Jr
OL	58	Cameron Ambrose	Fr
OL	63	Darrell Harden	Fr
OL	64	Taylor Williams	Fr
OL	65	Noah Smith	Fr
OL	67	Ethan Miner	So
OL	68	Tristian Smith	Fr
OL	70	Tyler Adair	Fr
OL	71	Mehki Butler	So
OL	73	Ernesto Ramirez	Sr
OL	74	Elijah Zollicoffer	Fr
OL	75	Saidou Ba	Fr
OL	77	Makilan Thomas	Fr
OL	78	Chase Jessup	Fr
OL	79	Jordan Rhodes	Sr
WR	80	Trace Corum	Fr
WR	81	Omari Walker	Fr
TE	84	Bronte Gallo	Fr
TE	85	Thomas Vaughan	Fr
WR	86	Walker Catsavis	Fr
TE	87	Reed Tyler	Sr

Defense

Pos.	#	Name	Class
DL	0	John Mincey	Sr
CB	1	Samy Johnson	Jr
CB	2	Leon Jones	Jr
CB	3	Kenneth Harris	So
CB	4	Taylon Doss	So
LB	5	Kivon Bennett	Sr
CB	6	Ahmad Robinson	Fr
DL	7	Terion Sugick	Fr
S	8	Eddie Smith	Jr
S	9	Trevian Thomas	So
LB	10	Jordan Carmouche	Sr
LB	11	Jaden Harris	Jr
S	12	Websley Etienne	Fr
CB	14	James Reed III	Fr
DE	17	Blayne Toll	So
DE	18	Dennard Flowers	Fr
CB	19	Denzel Blackwell	So
LB	21	Melique Straker	Jr
S	22	Sam Graham	So
LB	23	Dane Motley	So
LB	24	Javante Mackey	Fr
DE	25	Keyron Crawford	Fr
LB	26	Tristan Shorter	Fr
S	27	KaRon Coleman	So
S	29	Justin Parks	So
LB	30	Andrew Agapos	Fr
DL	32	Ethan Hassler	So
LB	33	Cam Jeffery	So
CB	34	AJ Beale	Fr
LB	35	Cruz Temple	Fr
LB	36	Charles Willekes	So
DE	37	Robert McWilliams	Sr
CB	39	Jaxson Fleming	Fr
LB	40	Bryson Everett	Fr
LB	42	Chris Daley	Fr
LB	43	Tylon Nash	Fr
LB	44	Israel Whitmore	Fr
DE	45	TW Ayers	Jr
CB	46	Charles Shelton IV	Jr
S	48	Alston Elam	Fr
LB	51	Joe Britton	Jr
DL	90	Tim Hardiman	Fr
DL	91	Ashtin Rustemeyer	Fr
DE	92	Thurman Geathers	Sr
DE	93	Luke Ydarraga	Fr
DL	96	Kadan Lewis	Fr
DL	97	VJ Bronson	So
DL	99	Deris Jackson	Fr

Special teams

Pos.	#	Name	Class
K	32	Aidan Ellison	Fr
K	33	Dominic Zvada	Fr
LS	38	Jack Bullard	So
P	42	Magnus Haines	Fr
K	47	Tristan Mattson	So
P	48	Ryan Hanson	So
LS	53	Caleb McCall	Fr
LS	69	Ethan Johnson	Fr
P	92	William Przystup	Jr

Head coach

- Butch Jones (Ferris State)

Coordinators/assistant coaches

- Rob Harley (Michigan State)
  Defensive coordinator
- Keith Heckendorf (Nebraska)
  Offensive coordinator/qb
- Jake Schoonover (Missouri Western)
  Special teams coordinator
- Matt Limegrover (Northwestern)
  Run game coordinator/ol
- Marquase Lovings (Mississippi State)
  Running backs
- Andy Kwon (Alabama)
  Tight ends
- Derrick Lett (Bowling Green State)
  Wide receivers
- Vinson Reynolds (Northern Illinois)
  Defensive line
- John Shalala (Grand View)
  Linebackers
- Jay Simpson (South Alabama)
  Defensive backs

Legend

- (C) Team captain
- (S) Suspended
- (I) Ineligible
- Injured
- Redshirt

Roster
Last update: 31 August 2023
