= 2023 Camellia Bowl =

Postseason college football bowl game

- 10th Camellia Bowl
| Arkansas State Red Wolves | Northern Illinois Huskies |
| (6–6) | (6–6) |
| Sun Belt | MAC |
| 19 | 21 |
| Head coach: Butch Jones | Head coach: Thomas Hammock |
| | 1 | 2 | 3 | 4 | Total |
|---|---|---|---|---|---|
| Arkansas State | 7 | 6 | 0 | 6 | 19 |
| Northern Illinois | 13 | 8 | 0 | 0 | 21 |
- Date: December 23, 2023
- Season: 2023
- Stadium: Cramton Bowl
- Location: Montgomery, Alabama
- MVP: Rocky Lombardi (QB, Northern Illinois)
- Favorite: Arkansas State by 1.5
- Referee: Kevin Randall (AAC)
- Attendance: 11,310

United States TV coverage
- Network: ESPN; ESPN Radio
- Announcers: Courtney Lyle (play-by-play), Hutson Mason (analyst), and Ashley Stroehlein (sideline) (ESPN); Mike Couzens (play-by-play) and Aaron Murray (analyst) (ESPN Radio)

International TV coverage
- Network: ESPN Deportes and ESPN Brazil
- Announcers: ESPN Brazil: Conrado Giulietti (play-by-play) and Weinny Eirado (analyst)

The 2023 Camellia Bowl was a college football bowl game played on December 23, 2023, at the Cramton Bowl in Montgomery, Alabama. The 10th annual Camellia Bowl featured the Arkansas State Red Wolves from the Sun Belt Conference and the Northern Illinois Huskies from the Mid-American Conference (MAC). The game began at approximately 11:00 a.m. CST and was aired on ESPN. The Camellia Bowl was one of the 2023–24 bowl games concluding the 2023 FBS football season.

== Teams ==
Consistent with conference tie-ins, the bowl featured teams from the Mid-American Conference (MAC) and the Sun Belt Conference.

This was the ninth meeting between Arkansas State and Northern Illinois; entering the game, the Huskies led the all-time series 7–1, with the Red Wolves' lone victory coming in 1995. This was the second time that Arkansas State and Northern Illinois played each other in a bowl game, following the 2012 GoDaddy.com Bowl which saw the Huskies defeat the Red Wolves by a score of 38–20.

=== Arkansas State Red Wolves ===
Arkansas State entered the game with a 6–6 record (4–4 in the Sun Belt), tied for second in the Sun Belt's West Division.

The Red Wolves started their season with losses to Oklahoma and Memphis, losing by an aggregate score of 110–3. They won their next three gams, and went on to become bowl eligible with a 77–31 rout against Texas State in their final home game of the season. This was the 11th bowl appearance in Arkansas State program history, and their third Camellia Bowl—they previously lost the 2017 edition and won the 2019 edition.

=== Northern Illinois Huskies ===
The Huskies entered the game with a 6–6 record (5–3 in the MAC), finishing second in their conference's West Division. After losing four of their first five games, the team recovered to win five of their final seven games.

This was Northern Illinois' first appearance in the Camellia Bowl.

== Game summary ==
2023 Camellia Bowl

| Quarter | 1 | 2 | 3 | 4 | Total |
|---|---|---|---|---|---|
| Arkansas State | 7 | 6 | 0 | 6 | 19 |
| Northern Illinois | 13 | 8 | 0 | 0 | 21 |

at Cramton Bowl • Montgomery, Alabama

- Date: Saturday, December 23, 2023
- Game time: 11:00 a.m. CST
- Game weather: Sunny • Temperature: 61 °F (16 °C) • Wind: 3 mph (4.8 km/h) SW
- Game attendance: 11,310
- Referee: Kevin Randall
- TV announcers (ESPN): Courtney Lyle (play-by-play), Hutson Mason (analyst), and Ashley Stroehlein (sideline)
- Box score

Game information

First Quarter

- (9:09) NIU – Grayson Barnes 18 yard pass from Rocky Lombardi, two-point run conversion failed (Drive: 10 plays, 75 yards, 5:51; Northern Illinois 6–0)
- (5:59) ARKST – Corey Rucker 42 yard pass from Jaylen Raynor, Dominic Zvada kick (Drive: 1 play, 42 yards, 0:08; Arkansas State 7–6)
- (1:24) NIU – Rocky Lombardi 6 yard run, Kanon Woodill kick (Drive: 9 plays, 75 yards, 4:35; Northern Illinois 13–7)

Second Quarter

- (9:42) NIU – Kanon Woodill 32 yard pass from Tom Foley, Trayvon Rudolph two-point pass conversion from Rocky Lombardi (Drive: 8 plays, 87 yards, 4:03; Northern Illinois 21–7)
- (6:30) ARKST – Dominic Zvada 28 yard field goal (Drive: 11 plays, 65 yards, 3:12; Northern Illinois 21–10)
- (0:01) ARKST – Dominic Zvada 45 yard field goal (Drive: 5 plays, 31 yards, 0:25; Northern Illinois 21–13)

Third Quarter

No scoring

Fourth Quarter

- (1:14) ARKST – Corey Rucker 13 yard pass from Jaylen Raynor, two-point pass conversion failed (Drive: 8 plays, 86 yards, 2:38; Northern Illinois 21–19)

=== Statistics ===
| Statistics | ASU | NIU |
|---|---|---|
| First downs | 18 | 26 |
| Plays–yards | 57–351 | 72–421 |
| Rushes–yards | 27–101 | 42–189 |
| Passing yards | 250 | 232 |
| Passing: comp–att–int | 16–30–1 | 19–30–2 |
| Time of possession | 19:39 | 40:21 |

| Team | Category | Player | Statistics |
|---|---|---|---|
| Arkansas State | Passing | Jaylen Raynor | 16/30, 250 yards, 2 TD, INT |
| Arkansas State | Rushing | Jaylen Raynor | 13 carries, 49 yards |
| Arkansas State | Receiving | Corey Rucker | 5 receptions, 107 yards, 2 TD |
| Northern Illinois | Passing | Rocky Lombardi | 18/29, 200 yards, TD, 2 INT |
| Northern Illinois | Rushing | Antario Brown | 25 carries, 132 yards |
| Northern Illinois | Receiving | Grayson Barnes | 5 receptions, 105 yards, TD |
