= Ja'Quez Cross =

American football player (born 2002)

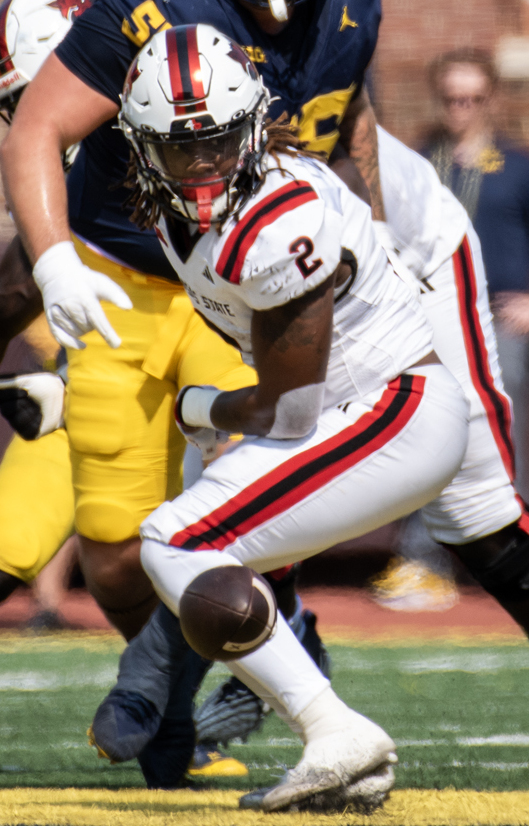
- Cross with Arkansas State in 2024

No. 11 – Appalachian State Mountaineers
- Position: Running back
- Class: Redshirt Senior

Personal information
- Born: January 11, 2002 (age 24)
- Listed height: 5 ft 9 in (1.75 m)
- Listed weight: 195 lb (88 kg)

Career information
- High school: Fordyce (Fordyce, Arkansas)
- College: Purdue (2021); Arkansas State (2022–2025); Appalachian State (2026–present)

Awards and highlights
- Third-team All-Sun Belt (2023)
- Stats at ESPN

Ja'Quez Cross (born January 11, 2002) is an American college football running back for Appalachian State. He previously played for the Purdue Boilermakers and Arkansas State Red Wolves.

== Early life ==
Cross grew up in Hampton, Arkansas and attended Fordyce High School where he lettered in football and basketball. In his high school career, Cross completed 141 carries for 1,310 yards and 25 touchdowns. He accumulated a total of 2,002 all-purpose yards and 1,656 total yards. He was ranked as a three-star rated recruit and originally committed to play college football at South Dakota State University before switching his commitment to play for Purdue University.

== College career ==
=== Purdue ===
During Cross's true freshman season in 2021, he appeared in three games and was redshirted. He finished the season with 13 recorded rushing attempts for 27 yards and a long run of five yards while also catching one pass which covered six yards.

On November 17, 2021, Cross announced that he would be entering the NCAA transfer portal. He would later transfer to Arkansas State.

=== Arkansas State ===
During the 2022 season, he appeared in eight games and started one against Louisiana. He finished the season with 24 recorded rushing attempts for 92 total rushing yards with a long run of 12 yards, along with 10 receptions for 56 yards.

During the 2023 season, he helped the Red Wolves receive their first victory of the season against Stony Brook where he rushed for a career-high 164 yards and two touchdowns. He also helped the team become bowl eligible with a 77–31 win against Texas State where he rushed for 139 yards and three touchdowns and then returned a kickoff 93 yards. Because of his performance, he was named the Sun Belt Conference Offensive and Special Teams Player of the Week. He finished the season with appearing in 13 games and recorded 128 rushing attempts for 716 yards and seven touchdowns, along with 24 receptions for 161 yards.

In 2025, Cross returned as the team’s starting running back. In the season opener against Southeast Missouri State, he rushed for 36 yards and a touchdown and added five receptions for 33 yards and a touchdown in a 42–24 victory. The following week, head coach Butch Jones announced that Cross would miss the remainder of the season after suffering a torn anterior cruciate ligament (ACL) during practice. On September 13, Cross was arrested following a DWI-related crash and was charged with misdemeanor fleeing, leaving the scene of an accident, resisting arrest, and second-degree criminal mischief. He was released from jail shortly afterward.

On December 19, 2025, Cross entered the NCAA transfer portal.

=== Appalachian State ===
On June 1, 2026, Cross transferred to Appalachian State.

=== Statistics ===
| Year | Team | Games | | Rushing | | | | Receiving | | | |
| Year | Team | GP | GS | Att | Yds | Avg | TD | Rec | Yds | Avg | TD |
|---|---|---|---|---|---|---|---|---|---|---|---|
| 2021 | Purdue | 3 | 1 | 13 | 27 | 2.1 | 0 | 1 | 6 | 6.0 | 0 |
| 2022 | Arkansas State | 8 | 1 | 24 | 92 | 3.8 | 0 | 10 | 56 | 5.6 | 0 |
| 2023 | Arkansas State | 13 | 13 | 128 | 716 | 5.6 | 7 | 24 | 161 | 6.7 | 0 |
| 2024 | Arkansas State | 13 | 6 | 115 | 638 | 5.5 | 2 | 35 | 228 | 6.5 | 1 |
| 2025 | Arkansas State | 1 | 1 | 8 | 36 | 4.5 | 1 | 5 | 33 | 6.6 | 1 |
| Career | | 38 | 22 | 288 | 1,509 | 5.2 | 10 | 75 | 484 | 6.5 | 1 |
