= 2023 Northern Illinois Huskies football team =

American college football season

2023 Northern Illinois Huskies football

Camellia Bowl champion

Camellia Bowl, W 21–19 vs. Arkansas State
- Conference: Mid-American Conference
- West Division
- Record: 7–6 (5–3 MAC)
- Head coach: Thomas Hammock (5th season)
- Offensive coordinator: Eric Eidsness (5th season)
- Offensive scheme: Multiple
- Defensive coordinator: Derrick Jackson (5th season)
- Co-defensive coordinator: Nick Benedetto (2nd season)
- Base defense: 4–2–5
- Home stadium: Huskie Stadium

2023 Mid-American Conference football standings
	Conf.			Overall
Team	W		L	W		L
East Division
Miami (OH) xy$	7	–	1	11	–	3
Ohio	6	–	2	10	–	3
Bowling Green	5	–	3	7	–	6
Buffalo	3	–	5	3	–	9
Akron	1	–	7	2	–	10
Kent State	0	–	8	1	–	11
West Division
Toledo xy	8	–	0	11	–	3
Northern Illinois	5	–	3	7	–	6
Eastern Michigan	4	–	4	6	–	7
Central Michigan	3	–	5	5	–	7
Ball State	3	–	5	4	–	8
Western Michigan	3	–	5	4	–	8
Championship: Miami (OH) 23, Toledo 14
$ – Conference champion; x – Division champion/co-champions; y – Championship game participant

The 2023 Northern Illinois Huskies football team represented Northern Illinois University as a member of the West Division of the Mid-American Conference (MAC) during the 2023 NCAA Division I FBS football season. The Huskies were led by fifth-year head coach Thomas Hammock and played their home games at Huskie Stadium in DeKalb, Illinois. The Huskies drew an average home attendance of 9,456 in 2023.

The Huskies hoped to improve after finishing 3-9 the previous season. They started off with an upset win at Boston College to collect their 18th "Boneyard win". The next game saw the Huskies get upset by FCS Southern Illinois at home. The Huskies were 1-4 after 5 games but managed to snap their 4-game skid by winning 5 of their remaining 7 games. They finished the regular season 6–6 and 5–3 in conference play. The Huskies were invited to the Camellia Bowl and defeated Arkansas State 21–19 to win their first bowl game since 2012.

== Preseason ==
=== Preseason coaches poll ===
On July 20, the MAC announced the preseason coaches poll. Northern Illinois was picked to finish third in the West Division.

== Schedule ==
Date	Time	Opponent	Site	TV	Result	Attendance
September 2	11:00 a.m.	at Boston College*	Alumni Stadium; Chestnut Hill, MA	ACCN	W 27–24 ^{OT}	30,122
September 9	2:30 p.m.	No. 24 (FCS) Southern Illinois*	Huskie Stadium; DeKalb, IL	ESPN+	L 11–14	13,114
September 16	6:00 p.m.	at Nebraska*	Memorial Stadium; Lincoln, NE	FS1	L 11–35	86,875
September 23	11:00 a.m.	Tulsa*	Huskie Stadium; DeKalb, IL	CBSSN	L 14–22	10,321
September 30	2:30 p.m.	at Toledo	Glass Bowl; Toledo, OH	ESPNU	L 33–35	23,417
October 7	2:30 p.m.	at Akron	InfoCision Stadium–Summa Field; Akron, OH	ESPN+	W 55–14	8,216
October 14	3:00 p.m.	Ohio^{†}	Huskie Stadium; DeKalb, IL	ESPNU	W 23–13	11,143
October 21	2:30 p.m.	Eastern Michigan	Huskie Stadium; DeKalb, IL	ESPN+	W 20–13	9,458
October 31	6:00 p.m.	at Central Michigan	Kelly/Shorts Stadium; Mount Pleasant, MI	ESPNU	L 31–37	9,625
November 7	6:00 p.m.	Ball State	Huskie Stadium; DeKalb, IL (Bronze Stalk Trophy)	CBSSN	L 17–20	6,282
November 14	6:00 p.m.	Western Michigan	Huskie Stadium; DeKalb, IL	ESPNU	W 24–0	6,417
November 25	11:00 a.m.	at Kent State	Dix Stadium; Kent, OH	ESPN+	W 37–27	5,427
December 23	11:00 a.m.	vs. Arkansas State*	Cramton Bowl; Montgomery, AL (Camellia Bowl)	ESPN	W 21–19	11,310
*Non-conference game; ^{†}Homecoming; Rankings from AP Poll and CFP Rankings (after November 2) released prior to game; All times are in Central time

== Game summaries ==
=== at Boston College ===
Northern Illinois (0–0) @ Boston College (0–0)

Quarter	1	2	3	4	OT	Total
Huskies	0	7	7	7	6	27
Eagles	0	0	7	14	3	24

at Alumni Stadium • Chestnut Hill, Massachusetts

- Date: September 2, 2022
- Game time: 11:04 pm CDT
- Game attendance: 30,122
- Referee: Billy Williams
- TV announcers (ACCN): Chris Cotter (play-by-play), Mark Herzlich (analyst)

Game information

Second quarter

- (02:44) NIU TD: Antario Brown 7–yard pass from Justin Lynch (Jake Seibert kick) NIU 7–0; 8 plays, 60 yards, 5:14.

Third quarter

- (10:33) NIU TD: Antario Brown 2–yard run (Jake Seibert kick) NIU 14–0; 9 plays, 75 yards, 4:27.
- (04:58) BC TD: Lewis Bond 11–yard pass from Thomas Castellanos (Liam Connor kick) NIU 14–7; 5 plays, 25 yards, 1:55.

Fourth quarter

- (09:24) NIU TD: Brock Lampe 1–yard run (Jake Seibert kick) NIU 21–7; 12 plays, 55 yards, 7:04.
- (05:59) BC TD: Thomas Castellanos 2–yard run (Liam Connor kick) NIU 21–14; 10 plays, 59 yards, 3:24.
- (01:44) BC TD: Jaden Williams 30-yard pass from Thomas Castellanos (Liam Conner kick) TIE 21–21; 6 plays 83 yards, 1:39

Overtime

- (00:00) BC FG: Liam Connor 39-yard field goal BC 24–21; 4 plays, 4 yards, 0:00.
- (00:00) NIU TD: Rocky Lombardi 1-yard run NIU 27–24; 4 plays, 25 yards, 0:00.

Statistics	NIU	BC
First downs	21	19
Plays–yards	78–338	66–314
Rushes–yards	48–166	28–146
Passing yards	172	168
Passing: comp–att–int	14–30–0	17–38–1
Turnovers		
Time of possession	36:53	23:07

Team	Category	Player	Statistics
NIU	Passing	Rocky Lombardi	13/29, 165 yds
NIU	Rushing	Gavin Williams	15 rushes, 61 yds
NIU	Receiving	Kacper Rutkiewicz	5 receptions, 46 yds
BC	Passing	Thomas Castellanos	13/28, 138 yds, 2 TDs, INT
BC	Rushing	Thomas Castellanos	9 rushes, 74 yds, TD
BC	Receiving	Lewis Bond	4 receptions, 40 yds, TD

=== Southern Illinois ===
Southern Illinois (1–0) at Northern Illinois (1–0)

Quarter	1	2	3	4	Total
Salukis	7	0	7	0	14
Huskies	0	0	3	8	11

at Huskie Stadium • DeKalb, Illinois

- Date: September 9, 2023
- Game time: 2:32 pm CDT
- Game attendance: 13,114
- Referee: Matt Packowski
- TV: ESPN+

Game information

First quarter

- (01:58) SIU TD: Nic Baker 8-yard run (Thomas Burks kick) SIU 7–0; 5 plays, 70 yards, 2:48.

Third quarter

- (11:45) SIU TD: Ro Elliott 10–yard run (Thomas Burks kick) SIU 14–0; 5 plays, 57 yards, 2:48.
- (05:35) NIU FG: Jake Siebert 27-yard field goal SIU 14–3; 13 plays, 65 yards, 6:10.

Fourth quarter

- (09:24) NIU TD: Kacper Rutkiewicz 62-yard pass from Rocky Lombardi (Rocky Lombardi pass) SIU 14–11; 9 plays, 99 yards, 4:56.

Statistics	SIU	NIU
First downs	12	19
Plays–yards	50–217	72–360
Rushes–yards	26–73	34–63
Passing yards	144	297
Passing: comp–att–int	16–24–0	23–38–3
Turnovers		
Time of possession	24:01	35:59

Team	Category	Player	Statistics
SIU	Passing	Nic Baker	16/24, 144 yds
SIU	Rushing	Ro Elliott	9 rushes, 62 yds
SIU	Receiving	Aidan Quinn	2 receptions, 47 yds
NIU	Passing	Rocky Lombardi	23/38, 297 yds, TD, 3 INTs
NIU	Rushing	Antario Brown	22 rushes, 66 yds
NIU	Receiving	Kacper Rutkiewicz	6 receptions, 139 yds, TD

=== at Nebraska ===
Northern Illinois (1–1) at Nebraska (0–2)

Quarter	1	2	3	4	Total
Huskies	3	0	0	8	11
Cornhuskers	7	7	7	14	35

at Memorial Stadium • Lincoln, Nebraska

- Date: September 16, 2023
- Game time: 6:00 pm CDT
- Game weather: Temperature: 79 °F (26 °C) • Wind: North at 8 miles per hour (13 km/h) • Weather: Sunny
- Game attendance: 86,875
- Referee: Chris Coyte
- TV announcers (FS1): Jeff Levering (play-by-play), Mark Helfrich (analyst)

Game information

First quarter

- (9:39) NEB - Billy Kemp IV 10-yard pass from Heinrich Haarberg, Tristan Alvano kick (6 plays, 55 yards, 3:17, Nebraska 7-0)
- (3:08) NIU - Jake Seibert 30-yard field goal ('4 plays, -8 yards, 2:13, Nebraska 7-3)

Second quarter

- (3:15) NEB – Thomas Fidone II 16-yard pass from Heinrich Haarberg, Tristan Alvano kick (4 plays, 36 yards, 2:14, Nebraska 14-3)

Third quarter

- (1:00) NEB – Gabe Ervin Jr. 3-yard run, Tristan Alvano kick (14 plays, 76 yards, 7:10, Nebraska 21-3)

Fourth Quarter

- (8:19) NEB – Heinrich Haarberg 20-yard run, Tristan Alvano kick (9 plays, 65 yards, 5:33, Nebraska 28-3)
- (3:23) NEB – Anthony Grant 11-yard run, Tristan Alvano kick (5 plays, 35 yards, 3:07, Nebraska 35-3)
- (0:04) NIU – Ethan Hampton 4-yard pass from Chris Carter, Billy Dozier 2-pt PAT pass from Chris Carter (11 plays, 75 yards, 3:19, Nebraska 35-11)

Statistics	NIU	Neb
First downs	12	23
Plays–yards	149	382
Rushes–yards	22–26	44–224
Passing yards	123	158
Passing: comp–att–int	17–36–1	14–24–0
Turnovers		
Time of possession	23:43	36:17

Team	Category	Player	Statistics
NIU	Passing	Rocky Lombardi	11/28, 73 yds, 1 INT
NIU	Rushing	Antario Brown	8 carries, 16 yds
NIU	Receiving	Davis Patterson	2 rec, 30 yds
Neb	Passing	Heinrich Haarberg	14/24, 158 yds, 2 TD
Neb	Rushing	Heinrich Haarberg	21 carries, 98 yds
Neb	Receiving	Thomas Fidone II	4 rec, 42 yds, 1 TD

=== vs Tulsa ===
Tulsa (1–2) at Northern Illinois (1–2)

Quarter	1	2	3	4	Total
Golden Hurricane	2	7	3	10	22
Huskies	0	7	7	0	14

at Huskie Stadium • DeKalb, Illinois

- Date: September 23, 2023
- Game time: 11:00 am CDT
- TV: CBSSN

Game information

First quarter

Second quarter

Third quarter

Fourth quarter

Statistics	Tul	NIU
First downs	17	18
Plays–yards	–281	–295
Rushes–yards	48–179	41–167
Passing yards	102	128
Passing: comp–att–int	8–20–2	17–29–2
Turnovers		
Time of possession	27:48	32:12

Team	Category	Player	Statistics
Tul	Passing	Cardell Williams	8–20, 102 yards, 2 INT
Tul	Rushing	Anthony Watkins	23 carries, 91 yards, 1 TD
Tul	Receiving	Kamdyn Benjamin	4 receptions, 53 yards
NIU	Passing	Ethan Hampton	13–23, 97 yards, 1 TD, 2 INT
NIU	Rushing	Justin Lynch	8 carries, 84 yards, 1 TD
NIU	Receiving	Grayson Barnes	3 receptions, 40 yards

=== vs Ohio ===
Ohio Bobcats(5–1) vs. Northern Illinois Huskies (2–4)

Quarter	1	2	3	4	Total
Bobcats	3	10	0	0	13
Huskies	7	0	10	6	23

at Huskie Stadium • DeKalb, IL

- Date: Saturday, October 14, 2023
- Game time: 3:00 p.m. CDT
- Game weather: cloudy, Temperature:53 °F (12 °C), Wind:Southwest 17 mph
- Game attendance: 11,143
- Referee: Andrew Speciale
- TV announcers (ESPNU): Drew Carter, Dustin Fox
- Ohio notes, boxcore

Game information

First Quarter

- (08:18) NIU - Gavin Williams 53 Yd Run (Kanon Woodill Kick) 7 plays, 85 yards, TOP 04:05 (NIU 7–0)
- (03:04) OHIO - Gianni Spetic 27 Yd Field Goal 10 plays, 51 yards, TOP 05:10 (NIU 7–3)

Second Quarter

- (10:22) OHIO - Kurtis Rourke 1 Yd Run (Gianni Spetic Kick) 13 plays, 60 yards, TOP 07:00 (OHIO 10–7)
- (00:07) OHIO - Gianni Spetic 37 Yd Field Goal 16 plays, 69 yards, TOP 06:00 (OHIO 13–7)

Third Quarter

- (12:54) NIU - Grayson Barnes 58 Yd pass from Rocky Lombardi (Kanon Woodill Kick) 3 plays, 66 yards, TOP 01:10 (NIU 14–13)
- (02:12) NIU - Kanon Woodill 31 Yd Field Goal 12 plays, 68 yards, TOP 06:50 (NIU 17–13)

Fourth Quarter

- (10:31) NIU - Kanon Woodill 37 Yd Field Goal 9 plays, 40 yards, TOP 05:11 (NIU 20–13)
- (08:09) NIU - Kanon Woodill 32 Yd Field Goal 4 plays, 5 yards, TOP 02:05 (NIU 23–13)

Statistics	Ohio	Northern Illinois
First downs	16	13
Total yards	254	302
Rushes/yards	159	172
Passing yards	159	172
Passing: Comp–Att–Int	22–36–3	15–23–0
Time of possession	28:15	31:45

Team	Category	Player	Statistics
Ohio	Passing	Kurtis Rourke	23/36, 159 yards, 3 INT
Ohio	Rushing	O'Shaan Allison	11 rushes, 43 yards
Ohio	Receiving	Sam Wiglusz	4 receptions, 37 yards
Northern Illinois	Passing	Rocky Lombardi	15/23, 172 yards, 1 TD
Northern Illinois	Rushing	Gavin Williams	10 rushes, 55 yards, 1 TD
Northern Illinois	Receiving	Grayson Barnes	2 receptions, 66 yards, 1 TD
