= Rob Harley (American football) =

American football coach (born 1982)

Current position
- Title: Head coach
- Team: Northern Illinois
- Conference: Mountain West
- Record: 0–11
- Annual salary: $260,000 (2024)

Biographical details
- Born: October 16, 1982 (age 44); Elmhurst, Illinois, U.S.
- Education: Ohio State University; Michigan State University

Playing career
- 2001–2005: Ohio State
- Position: Safety

Coaching career (HC unless noted)
- 2010–2011: Ohio Dominican (LB/DB)
- 2012–2013: Michigan State (GA)
- 2014: FIU (LB)
- 2015–2020: Pittsburgh (LB)
- 2021–2024: Arkansas State (AHC/DC)
- 2025: Northern Illinois (DC)
- 2026–present: Northern Illinois (interim HC)

Head coaching record
- Overall: 0–11

Accomplishments and honors

Championships
- BCS national champion (2002) (Player)

Rob Harley (born October 16, 1982) is an American football coach and former player. He is currently the interim head coach at Northern Illinois University.

== Coaching career ==
=== Ohio Dominican ===
After graduating from Ohio State University, Harley initially began his career in sports television before ultimately deciding “to grind in coaching rather than TV.” He began his coaching career at Ohio Dominican, coaching linebackers and defensive backs, along with serving as the assistant special teams coordinator during the 2010 and 2011 football seasons. Working with head coach Bill Conley, the staff helped the Panthers turn around from a 2-win team in 2010, to a 7-win team in 2011.

=== Michigan State ===
From there, Harley moved on to his next opportunity as a graduate assistant for the Michigan State Spartans, working for head coach Mark Dantonio. In 2012, Harley worked closely with offensive staff and special teams, a successful year that saw Le’Veon Bell rush for 1,793 yards. The following year, Harley worked with the defensive staff and defensive coordinator Pat Narduzzi. Harley helped coach the linebackers for a Spartans team that went 13–1, won the 2014 Rose Bowl, and ranked 2nd nationally in yards per game allowed (252.2).

=== FIU ===
Prior to the 2014 season, Harley was hired as the linebackers coach at FIU by head coach Ron Turner and defensive coordinator Josh Conklin. Harley helped lead one of the most disruptive defenses in college football that year, ranking 1st nationally in fumble recoveries (19), 2nd in defensive touchdowns (6), 4th in turnovers gained (33) and 35th in total defense (363.8 yards per game).

=== Pittsburgh ===
The following year, Conklin was hired as the defensive coordinator for Narduzzi's inaugural staff at Pittsburgh and Harley was hired as the linebackers coach, getting to reunite with Narduzzi. During Harley's tenure at Pitt, he mentored at least 4 All-ACC linebackers, including SirVocea Dennis and Nicholas Grigsby. Harley also spent the latter four years as the recruiting coordinator for the Panthers.

=== Arkansas State ===
From 2021 through 2024, Harley was the assistant head coach and defensive coordinator on Butch Jones’ staff at Arkansas State. Harley's continuously improved defensive squads helped turn the Red Wolves fortunes around, leading to a Bowl Game appearance in 2023 after a 5-year hiatus. During Harley's time in Jonesboro, ten defensive players earned All-Sun Belt honors.

=== Northern Illinois ===
Following the 2024 season, Harley returned to his native state of Illinois as the defensive coordinator for Thomas Hammock and the Northern Illinois Huskies football team. After Hammock left the team for a senior offensive assistant position with the NFL's Seattle Seahawks, Harley was named interim head coach by Northern Illinois to replace him on February 18, 2026.

== Playing career ==
Harley played safety for the Ohio State Buckeyes from 2001 through 2005, earning three letters, as well as being a member of the 2002 National Championship team. Rob wasn't the first Harley to play for the Buckeyes though, as his great-great uncle, Chic Harley, was the first 3-time All-American in Buckeye history.

== Personal life ==
Harley graduated with a bachelor's degree in business administration from Ohio State in 2006, and then a master's degree in kinesiology from Michigan State in 2013. Harley is married to his wife, Danielle, and they have two sons.

== Head coaching record ==
Year	Team	Overall	Conference	Standing	Bowl/playoffs
Northern Illinois Huskies (Mountain West Conference) (2026–present)
2026	Northern Illinois	0–10	0–6		
Northern Illinois:		0–10	0–6		
Total:		0–7			
