= Thomas Hammock =

American football player and coach (born 1981)

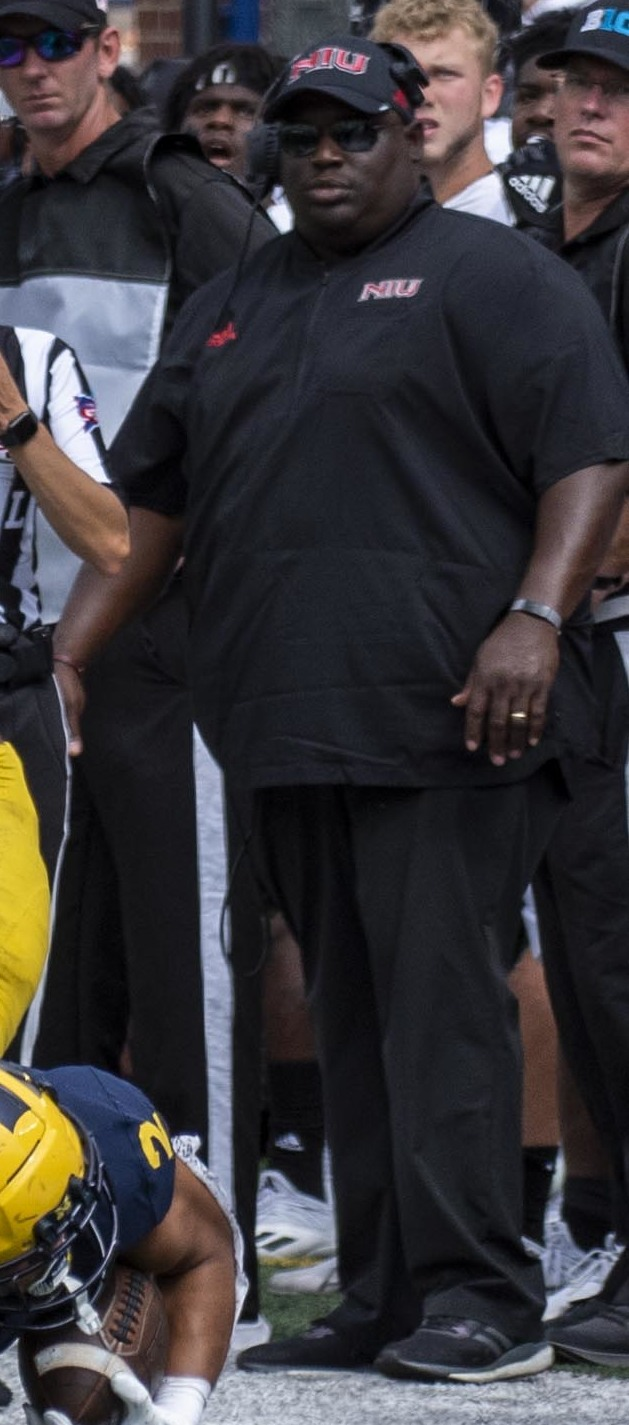
- Hammock in 2021

Seattle Seahawks
- Title: Running backs coach

Personal information
- Born: July 7, 1981 (age 45); Jersey City, New Jersey, U.S.
- Listed height: 5 ft 8 in (1.73 m)
- Listed weight: 211 lb (96 kg)

Career information
- Position: Running back (No. 28)
- High school: Bishop Luers (Fort Wayne, Indiana)
- College: Northern Illinois (1999–2002)

Career history
- Wisconsin (2003–2004) Graduate assistant; Northern Illinois (2005–2006) Running backs coach; Minnesota (2007–2009) Running backs coach; Minnesota (2010) Co-offensive coordinator & running backs coach; Wisconsin (2011–2013) Associate head coach & running backs coach; Baltimore Ravens (2014–2018) Running backs coach; Northern Illinois (2019–2025) Head coach; Seattle Seahawks (2026–present) Running backs coach

Awards and highlights
- MAC Coach of the Year (2021); 2x CoSIDA Academic All-American (2000, 2001); 2× First-team All-MAC (2000, 2001)

Thomas Hammock (born July 7, 1981) is an American football coach. He is the running backs coach for the Seattle Seahawks. Prior to this, he coached at his alma mater, Northern Illinois University, from January 2019 to February 2026. He served as the running backs coach for the Baltimore Ravens of the National Football League (NFL) for five seasons from 2014 to 2018.

== Biography ==
A native of Jersey City, New Jersey, Hammock was born on July 7, 1981. He attended Bishop Luers High School in Fort Wayne, Indiana before committing to Northern Illinois University (NIU) where he played running back from 1999 to 2002. Hammock earned his bachelor's degree in marketing from NIU in 2002, and a master's in educational leadership from the University of Wisconsin–Madison in 2004. He and his wife, Cheynnitha, also a NIU alum, have a daughter, Tierra, and a son, Thomas Douglas.

== Playing career ==
As a player, Thomas Hammock rushed for 2,432 yards in 32 games under head coach Joe Novak, which ranks 13th all-time at NIU. In both his sophomore and junior seasons, Hammock ran for over 1,000 yards, and was named first team CoSIDA Academic All-American. To start his senior campaign, Hammock rushed for 172 yards on 38 carries to help propel the Huskies to a 42–41 overtime win over Wake Forest. Following the game, however, Hammock noticed that he was having a hard time recovering with symptoms like shortness of breath and chest discomfort. Upon visiting several doctors and specialists, Hammock was diagnosed with a heart condition called hypertrophic cardiomyopathy. Through the recommendation of doctors, Hammock forwent the remainder of his senior season. Then in December 2002, shortly after graduating from NIU, Hammock announced his retirement with one season of eligibility remaining.

== Coaching career ==
Thomas Hammock began his coaching career at the University of Wisconsin–Madison, serving as a graduate assistant for the Wisconsin Badgers from 2003 to 2004. The following season, he was named the running backs coach at NIU, reuniting with his former head coach, Joe Novak. In Hammock's first season as running backs coach, Garrett Wolfe rushed for 1,580 yards and 16 touchdowns in just nine games as NIU won the MAC West Division and appeared in the MAC Championship Game for the first time in school history. Hammock then became a member of the Minnesota coaching staff from 2007 to 2010, first serving as the running backs coach before spending his final season as co-offensive coordinator under Jerry Kill.

In February 2011, Hammock was hired by Bret Bielema to serve as the running backs coach for Wisconsin where he coached standouts like Montee Ball, James White and Melvin Gordon. A trio that would run for 9,044 yards and 102 touchdowns during the three seasons Hammock was on staff. The most notable season being Montee Ball's 2011 campaign where he finished fourth in Heisman voting, breaking Barry Sanders’ single-season touchdown record with 39 total scores.

Hammock's success as a running backs coach at the collegiate level led to him joining the Baltimore Ravens in February 2014. There he served in a similar capacity under head coach John Harbaugh.

=== Northern Illinois ===
On January 18, 2019, Hammock was named the 23rd head football coach at his alma mater, Northern Illinois University (NIU). In his first season back at NIU, his team finished the season 5–7 overall and 4–4 in Mid-American Conference (MAC) play to tie for third place in the MAC's West Division.

Hammock's second season as head coach was shorted due to the COVID-19 pandemic. Touting a roster that was composed of 71 percent freshmen, inexperience and youth became additional challenges for an already unprecedented season. The Huskies went winless in six games against conference opponents. However, the season laid a foundation for many freshmen who saw significant playing time.

Prior to the 2021 season, Northern Illinois was predicted to finish last in the MAC West Division. In week one, the Huskies went into Atlanta and stunned Georgia Tech, 22–21. The team that was led by transfer quarterback, Rocky Lombardi went on to win the conference that season and it earned coach Hammock the 2021 MAC Football Coach of the year.

On November 9, 2021, Hammock signed a contract extension through the 2026 season.

On September 7, 2024, Hammock's Huskies defeated the fifth-ranked Notre Dame Fighting Irish at Notre Dame Stadium, earning NIU its first-ever win over a top-10 opponent, and becoming the first MAC team to ever beat a top-5 opponent.

=== Seattle Seahawks ===
On February 18, 2026, Hammock was hired by the Seattle Seahawks to serve as the team's running backs coach.

== Head coaching record ==
Year	Team	Overall	Conference	Standing	Bowl/playoffs
Northern Illinois Huskies (Mid-American Conference) (2019–2025)
2019	Northern Illinois	5–7	4–4	T–3rd (West)	
2020	Northern Illinois	0–6	0–6	6th (West)	
2021	Northern Illinois	9–5	6–2	T–1st (West)	L Cure
2022	Northern Illinois	3–9	2–6	6th (West)	
2023	Northern Illinois	7–6	5–3	2nd (West)	W Camellia
2024	Northern Illinois	8–5	4–4	T–6th	W Famous Idaho Potato
2025	Northern Illinois	3–9	2–6	T–11th	
Northern Illinois:		35–47	23–31		
Total:		35–47			
