= 2011 Liberty Bowl =

2011 AutoZone Liberty Bowl
- 53rd Liberty Bowl
Cincinnati Bearcats	Vanderbilt Commodores
(9–3)	(6–6)
Big East	SEC
31	24
Head coach: Butch Jones	Head coach: James Franklin
AP / Coaches; RV / 24
	1	2	3	4	Total
Cincinnati	0	14	0	17	31
Vanderbilt	7	0	7	10	24
- Date: December 31, 2011
- Season: 2011
- Stadium: Liberty Bowl Memorial Stadium
- Location: Memphis, Tennessee
- MVP: Isaiah Pead (RB, Cincinnati)
- Favorite: Vanderbilt by 3
- Referee: Land Clark (Pac-12)
- Halftime show: KC and the Sunshine Band
- Attendance: 57,103
- Payout: US$1.35 million per team

United States TV coverage
- Network: ABC
- Announcers: Dave LaMont (Play-by-Play); Ray Bentley (Analyst); Quint Kessenich (Sidelines)
- Nielsen ratings: 1.88

The 2011 Liberty Bowl was a college football postseason bowl game played on December 31, 2011, at Liberty Bowl Memorial Stadium in Memphis, Tennessee. With sponsorship from AutoZone, the 53rd edition of the Liberty Bowl was officially the AutoZone Liberty Bowl.

The game, which was telecast at 2:30 p.m. CT on ABC, featured the Cincinnati Bearcats, Big East co-champions, versus the Vanderbilt Commodores of the Southeastern Conference (SEC). It was the first edition of the game to be aired by ABC since 1980. Cincinnati won the game, 31–24, in front of a crowd of 57,103.

== Teams ==
After finishing the 2011 season with six wins and six losses, the Vanderbilt Commodores ended in fourth place in the Southeastern Conference (SEC) East Division. They were chosen as the SEC representative to the Liberty Bowl. The Commodores' roster included junior-year quarterback Jordan Rodgers, the younger brother of Green Bay Packers' Super Bowl-winning quarterback Aaron Rodgers.

The Cincinnati Bearcats ended the regular season with nine wins and three losses and were co-champions of the Big East Conference. Cincinnati was chosen as part of the alternate Big East tie-in with the Liberty Bowl in place of the Conference USA champions. The Bearcats' squad included Ralph Abernathy IV, grandson of Ralph Abernathy, a leader in the Civil Rights Movement.

In the 2011 season, both teams had beaten Connecticut. Vanderbilt won 24–21 at home in the second game of their season. Cincinnati won 35–27 at home in their final regular-season game. Both teams also lost to Tennessee. Vanderbilt dropped their second-to-last game on the road to the Volunteers by a score of 21–27. Cincinnati's loss was also in Knoxville by a score of 23–45 in the second game of their season.

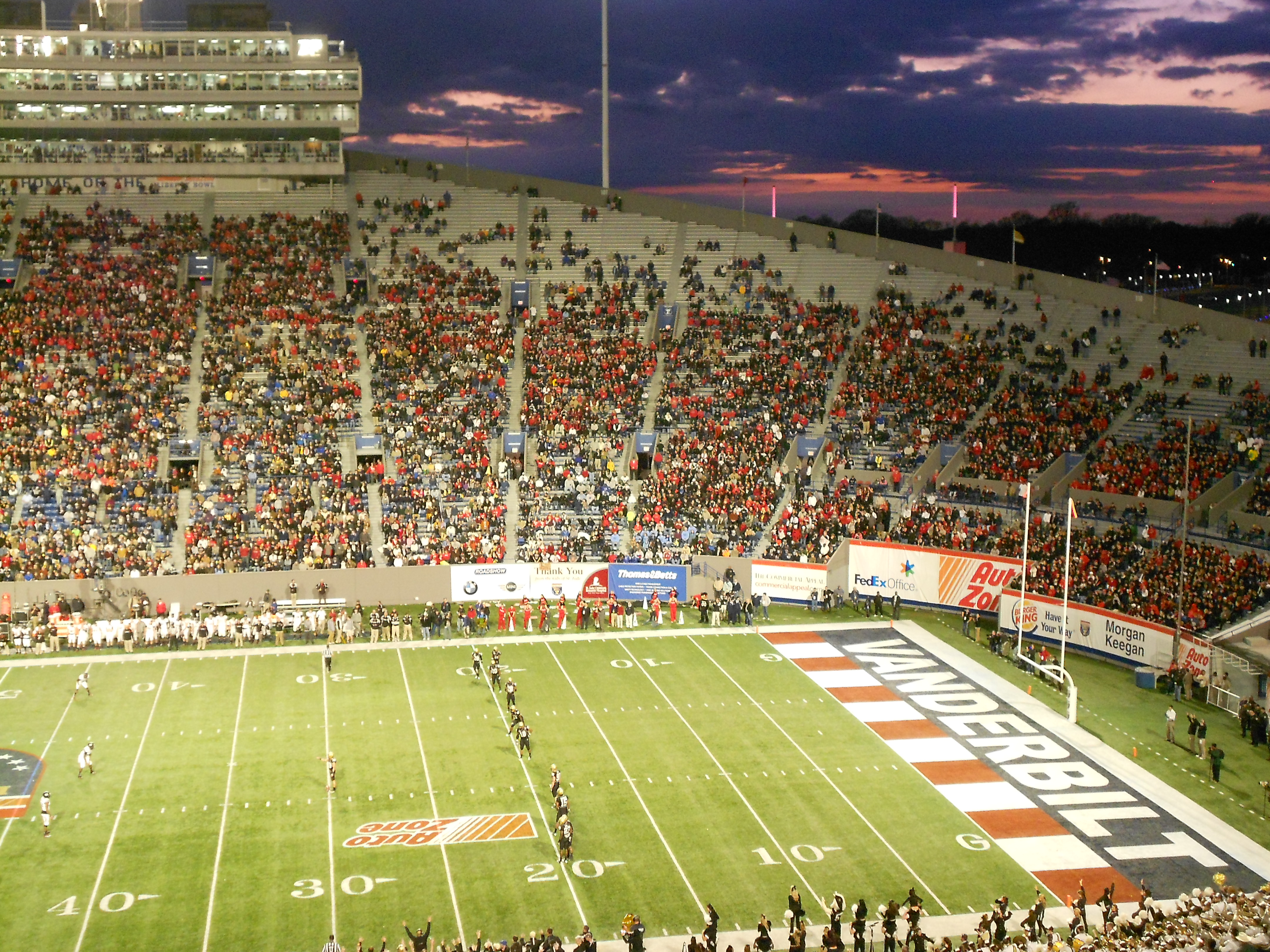
Vanderbilt kicks off to the Bearcats

== Game ==
After a touchdown by Zac Stacy and a successful conversion kick by Ryan Fowler, the Commodores were ahead at the end of the first quarter by 7–0. The Bearcats dominated the scoreboard in the second quarter with touchdowns by George Winn and Anthony McClung (with successful conversions by Tony Milano) and Cincinnati went into halftime with a 14–7 lead.

The halftime entertainment was presented by KC and the Sunshine Band. The group performed three of their hit songs – "Boogie Shoes", "Get Down Tonight", and "That's The Way I Like It". They were accompanied by a number of marching bands and dance groups from around the country.

After halftime, Vanderbilt tied the score with a Jerron Seymour touchdown and Ryan Fowler conversion and the third quarter ended 14–14. Shortly after the start of the fourth quarter, Cincinnati again took a 17–14 lead with a Tony Milano field goal. Vanderbilt responded with a touchdown by Chris Boyd and conversion by Fowler to retake the lead 21–17. Ralph Abernathy IV and Isaiah Pead then scored a pair of touchdowns (and two conversions for Milano) for Cincinnati, who went ahead 31–21. Vanderbilt finished the game with a Ryan Fowler field goal. The final score was Cincinnati 31 – 24 Vanderbilt.

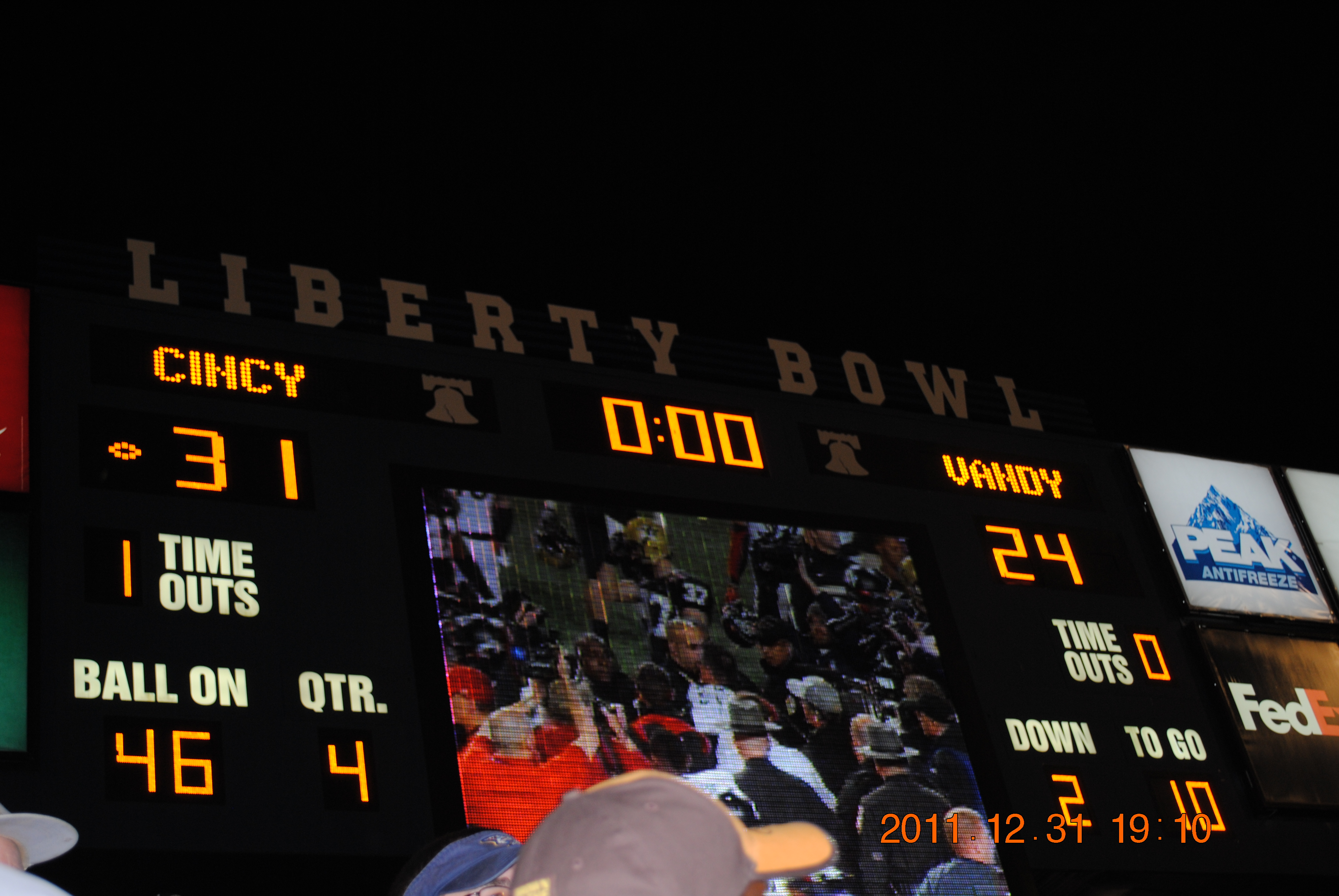
The final scoreboard at the conclusion of the game.

== MVP ==
After running for 149 yards and a touchdown, Isaiah Pead was named the game's Most Valuable Player. Pead led the Bearcats in carries (28) and rushing yards (149) and was the team's third leading receiver with 3 receptions for 15 yards.

== Statistics ==
Both teams were evenly matched in total offensive yards (Cincinnati 301, Vanderbilt 295) and yards per play (Bearcats 4.1, Commodores 4.2), but Cincinnati had a decisive edge (20–14) in total first downs. Vanderbilt played more of a passing game with 12 completions in 34 attempts for 168 yards (4.9 yards per attempt). Cincinnati also completed 12 passes but in 29 attempts for 2.8 yards per attempt. The Bearcats played more of a running game with 44 carries for 221 yards (5 yards per carry) while the Commodores had 36 carries for 127 yards (3.5 yards per carry).

Both teams threw two interceptions, but the Commodores also lost a fumble. Cincinnati received five penalties for 55 yards and Vanderbilt had six penalties for 39 total yards. The Bearcats had a slight edge in time of possession with 30:46 to the Commodores 29:14.
