= Keith Heckendorf =

American football player and coach (born 1981)

Current position
- Title: Quarterbacks coach
- Team: Iowa State
- Conference: Big 12

Biographical details
- Born: April 23, 1981 (age 44); Mosinee, Wisconsin, U.S.

Playing career
- 2000–2003: St. Cloud State
- Position: Quarterback

Coaching career (HC unless noted)
- 2004: Mosinee HS (WI) (assistant)
- 2005: Nebraska (OQC)
- 2006–2007: Nebraska (GA)
- 2008–2010: Western Carolina (OC/QB)
- 2011–2013: North Carolina (player development)
- 2014: Arkansas State (TE/RC)
- 2014–2015: North Carolina (QB/RC)
- 2016–2018: North Carolina (QB/PGC)
- 2019–2020: Arkansas State (AHC/OC/QB)
- 2021–2025: Arkansas State (OC/QB)
- 2026–present: Iowa State (QB)

Keith Heckendorf (born April 23, 1981) is an American football coach who is currently the quarterbacks coach at Iowa State University. He was previously the offensive coordinator and quarterbacks coach at Arkansas State University as well as the quarterbacks coach and pass game coordinator at the University of North Carolina at Chapel Hill.

== Playing career ==
Heckendorf played quarterback at St. Cloud State from 2000 to 2003. At St. Cloud, he set program records for career passing yards, career touchdowns, and career pass completions. He was also a three-time Harlon Hill Trophy finalist (the D-II equivalent of the Heisman Trophy), and an All-American. He was also a National Football Foundation Scholar athlete in 2003, and was inducted into the school's hall of fame in 2017.

== Coaching career ==
After his playing career concluded, Heckendorf was an assistant at his high school alma mater Mosinee High School in Mosinee, Wisconsin before spending time at Nebraska as a quality control coach and graduate assistant. He also had a stint at Western Carolina from 2008 to 2010 as their offensive coordinator.

Heckendorf was hired in a player development position at North Carolina in 2011. He was promoted to quarterbacks coach and recruiting coordinator in 2014. At UNC, he was the position coach for Mitchell Trubisky, who rose from a backup quarterback to the No. 2 overall pick of the 2017 NFL draft over the span of a year.

=== Arkansas State ===
Heckendorf was named the offensive coordinator and quarterbacks coach at Arkansas State in 2019. He spent time as their tight ends coach and recruiting coordinator for about a month before he was re-hired as the quarterbacks coach at North Carolina. Heckendorf was named a nominee for the Broyles Award in 2019, an award given to the top assistant coach in college football. On December 10, 2020, after head coach Blake Anderson left to take the same job at Utah State, Heckendorf was named interim head coach for the Red Wolves.

After initially being replaced by Major Applewhite and A. J. Milwee, Heckendorf was retained as offensive coordinator by newly hired Arkansas State head coach Butch Jones.
