= Trevian Thomas =

American football player (born 2002)

Profile
- Position: Safety

Personal information
- Born: March 4, 2002 (age 24); Americus, Georgia, U.S.
- Listed height: 5 ft 11 in (1.80 m)
- Listed weight: 196 lb (89 kg)

Career information
- High school: Americus High School (Americus, Georgia)
- College: Arkansas State (2020–2024)
- NFL draft: 2025: undrafted

Career history
- Carolina Panthers (2025); Jacksonville Jaguars (2025)*
- * Offseason or practice squad member only

Awards and highlights
- First team All-Sun Belt (2024)

Career NFL statistics as of 2025
- Total tackles: 1
- Stats at Pro Football Reference

Trevian Thomas (born March 4, 2002) is an American professional football safety. He played college football for the Arkansas State Red Wolves.

== Early life and college career ==
Thomas was born on March 4, 2002, and grew up in Americus, Georgia. He attended Americus High School where he played football as a safety. He was the team's leading tackler as a sophomore and as a senior was named first-team all-region after totaling 63 tackles and two interceptions. A three-star recruit, he committed to play college football for the Arkansas State Red Wolves.

Thomas played on special teams for the Red Wolves in 2020 and 2021, then won a starting role in 2022. He posted nine tackles in 11 games in 2020 and then seven tackles in 12 games in 2021. In 2022, he totaled 71 tackles and returned an interception for a touchdown. Thomas then had 91 tackles, six pass breakups, two interceptions and two fumble recoveries in 2023. In his last year, 2024, he tallied 79 tackles and led the Sun Belt Conference with five interceptions, earning first-team All-Sun Belt as well as Group of Five All-American honors. He concluded his collegiate career having appeared in 61 games, posting 257 tackles, eight interceptions and nine passes defended.

== Professional career ==
Pre-draft measurables
Height	Weight	Arm length	Hand span	Wingspan	40-yard dash	10-yard split	20-yard split	20-yard shuttle	Three-cone drill	Vertical jump	Broad jump	Bench press
5 ft 10 3/4 in (1.80 m)	193 lb (88 kg)	32 1/2 in (0.83 m)	8 7/8 in (0.23 m)	6 ft 3 3/4 in (1.92 m)	4.48 s	1.58 s	2.60 s	4.38 s	7.08 s	36.0 in (0.91 m)	10 ft 3 in (3.12 m)	16 reps
All values from Pro Day

=== Carolina Panthers ===
After going unselected in the 2025 NFL draft, Thomas signed with the Carolina Panthers as an undrafted free agent. He posted six tackles in preseason, but was waived on August 26, 2025, then re-signed to the practice squad the next day. On October 1, Thomas was signed to the active roster. He was waived on October 14 and re-signed to the practice squad two days later. On November 25, Thomas was released by Carolina following the signing of Isaiah Simmons.

=== Jacksonville Jaguars ===
On November 26, 2025, Thomas was signed to the Jacksonville Jaguars' practice squad. He signed a reserve/future contract with Jacksonville on January 12, 2026.

On August 30, 2026, Thomas was waived by the Jaguars as a part of final roster cuts.
