= Antario Brown =

American football player (born 2002)

Profile
- Position: Running back

Personal information
- Born: December 29, 2002 (age 23); Savannah, Georgia, U.S.
- Listed height: 5 ft 10 in (1.78 m)
- Listed weight: 221 lb (100 kg)

Career information
- High school: Beach (Savannah, Georgia)
- College: Northern Illinois (2021–2024)
- NFL draft: 2025: undrafted

Career history
- Calgary Stampeders (2025)*; Edmonton Elks (2026)*
- * Offseason or practice squad member only
- Stats at CFL.ca

Antario Brown (born December 29, 2002) is an American professional football running back. He played college football for the Northern Illinois Huskies.

== Early life ==
When Brown was 13 in 2016, his mother died after being shot in her car in front of the family's apartment after coming home from a work shift. He attended Beach High School in Savannah, Georgia, where he rushed for 1,008 yards in 10 games as a junior. Brown originally committed to the University of South Carolina to play college football but changed to Northern Illinois University.

== College career ==
As a true freshman at Northern Illinois in 2021, Brown started two of 10 games and rushed for 538 yards on 81 carries with five touchdowns. As a sophomore in 2022, he started three of 10 games, rushing for 689 on 110 carries and seven touchdowns. Brown became a full-time starter his junior year in 2023, rushing for 1,296 yards on 212 carries with 10 touchdowns. He returned to Northern Illinois in 2024.

== Professional career ==
Pre-draft measurables
Height	Weight	Arm length	Hand span	Bench press
5 ft 10 1/8 in (1.78 m)	214 lb (97 kg)	30 in (0.76 m)	8 3/8 in (0.21 m)	16 reps
All values from Pro Day

On October 7, 2025, Brown was signed to the practice roster of the Calgary Stampeders of the Canadian Football League (CFL). He was released on October 10, 2025.

Brown signed with the CFL's Edmonton Elks on January 23, 2026. He was released on May 13, 2026.
