= Dominic Zvada =

American football player (born 2003)

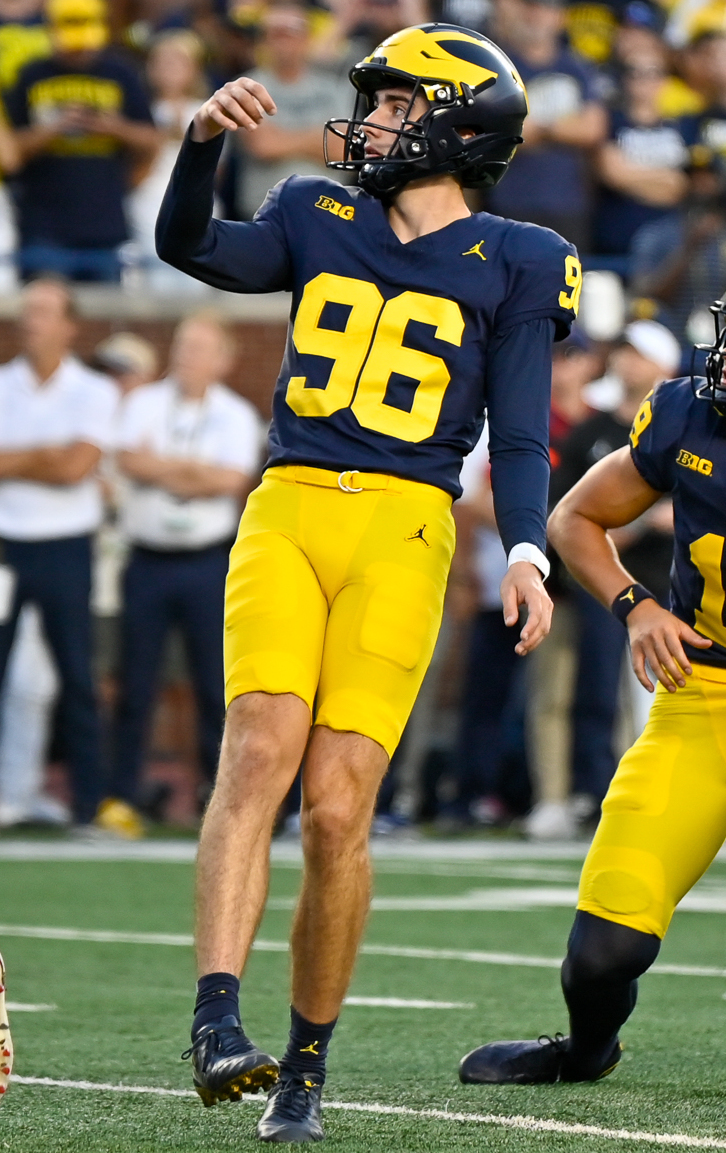
- Zvada with the Michigan Wolverines in 2024

No. 34 – New York Giants
- Position: Placekicker
- Roster status: Active

Personal information
- Born: October 25, 2003 (age 23)
- Listed height: 6 ft 3 in (1.91 m)
- Listed weight: 178 lb (81 kg)

Career information
- High school: Valley Christian (Chandler, Arizona)
- College: Arkansas State (2022–2023); Michigan (2024–2025)
- NFL draft: 2026: undrafted

Career history
- New York Giants (2026–present)

Awards and highlights
- First-team All-American (2024); Big Ten Kicker of the Year (2024); First-team All-Big Ten (2024); First-team All-Sun Belt (2022); Freshman All-American (2022)

Career NFL statistics as of Week 7, 2026
- Field goals made: 13
- Field goals attempted: 18
- Field goal %: 72.2
- Extra points made: 12
- Extra points attempted: 12
- Extra point %: 100
- Points: 51
- Longest field goal: 56
- Touchbacks: 4
- Stats at Pro Football Reference

Dominic Zvada (born October 25, 2003) is an American professional football placekicker for the New York Giants of the National Football League (NFL). He played college football for the Arkansas State Red Wolves and the Michigan Wolverines. Zvada was an All-American and the Big Ten Kicker of the Year with Michigan in 2024. He was signed by the Giants as an undrafted free agent in 2026.

== Early life ==
Zvada was born on October 25, 2003, the son of Jeff and Jody Zvada, and attended Valley Christian High School in Chandler, Arizona. He was rated as a five-star kicking recruit, holding the Arizona high school state record with a field goal of 55 yards in 2020. Zvada committed to play college football for the Arkansas State Red Wolves.

== College career ==
=== Arkansas State ===
As a freshman in 2022, Zvada made 17 of his 18 field goal attempts and 30 of his 31 extra point attempts, with his only misses being blocked. For his performance, he finished the year as a Lou Groza Award semifinalist and a Freshman All-American. In 2023, Zvada converted on 17 of his 22 field goal attempts and made all 41 of his extra points. After the conclusion of the 2023 season, Zvada entered the NCAA transfer portal.

=== Michigan ===
==== 2024 ====
In April 2024, Zvada transferred to the University of Michigan to play for first-year head coach Sherrone Moore. He was named the Wolverines starting kicker in the season opener versus Fresno State. Zvada made all six kicks, three extra points and three field goals. He connected on field goals of 55, 53 and 45 yards, earning him the week one Big Ten co-special teams player of the week. In week two against Texas, Zvada was two for two with field goals of 52 and 37 yards. In week five against Minnesota, Zvada connected on his fourth field goal of over 50 yards, making field goals of 53 and 35 yards to remain a perfect 7 of 7 for the season. He became the only kicker in Michigan football history to successfully make four over 50 yards in the same season, and earned the week five Big Ten special teams player of the week.

In week eleven against Indiana, Zvada connected on field goals of 56, 39 and 22 yards. In making his 56-yard field goal, he tied his personal best for career long, and became the single-season and career leader in Michigan football history with five field goals made over 50 yards. He was five for five on field goals over 50 yards in 2024 to this point. Following week eleven, Zvada was named the Big Ten special teams player of the week for a third time in 2024. After a bye, in week thirteen versus Northwestern, Zvada matched his career long in consecutive games. He connected on field goals of 56 and 28 yards, extending both his school records to six. In the last week of the season against Ohio State, Zvada connected on two field goals, a 54 yard in the second quarter and the game-winning 21-yard field goal with 45 seconds left in the game; leading Michigan to a 13–10 win over their arch-rival. He extended both his school records again, remaining a perfect seven for seven in 2024 from field goals over 50 yards.

In the ReliaQuest Bowl, Zvada made all four of his field goals (45, 37, 30 and 21 yards), as Michigan defeated Alabama 19-13. He ended the season 21 of 22 (95.5%), with his only miss being blocked. The 95.5 percent conversion rate was a single-season record for the Michigan football program. Following the 2024 season, Zvada was named an All-Big Ten team selection, awarded the Big Ten Kicker of the Year and was an All-American. He was named a first-team All-American by ESPN, The Athletic and The Sporting News.

==== 2025 ====
On December 10, 2024, Zvada announced he would be returning to Michigan for his senior season in 2025. He was ranked as a consensus top three NFL kicking prospect following his junior season. In 2025, Zvada failed to replicate the success from the 2024 season, connecting on 17/25 field goals. In week four, he was named the Co-Big Ten Special Teams Player of the Week for his performance against Nebraska, making all three field goal attempts and matching his career-long of 56 yards.

== Professional career ==
Pre-draft measurables
Height	Weight	Arm length	Hand span	Wingspan
6 ft 3 1/4 in (1.91 m)	178 lb (81 kg)	31 3/4 in (0.81 m)	9 1/8 in (0.23 m)	6 ft 4 7/8 in (1.95 m)
All values from NFL Combine

On April 25, 2026, Zvada signed with the New York Giants after going undrafted in the 2026 NFL draft. On August 28, 2026, Giants head coach John Harbaugh stated that Zvada had won the Giants kicking job, over Ben Sauls.
