= Rocky Lombardi =

American football player (born 1998)

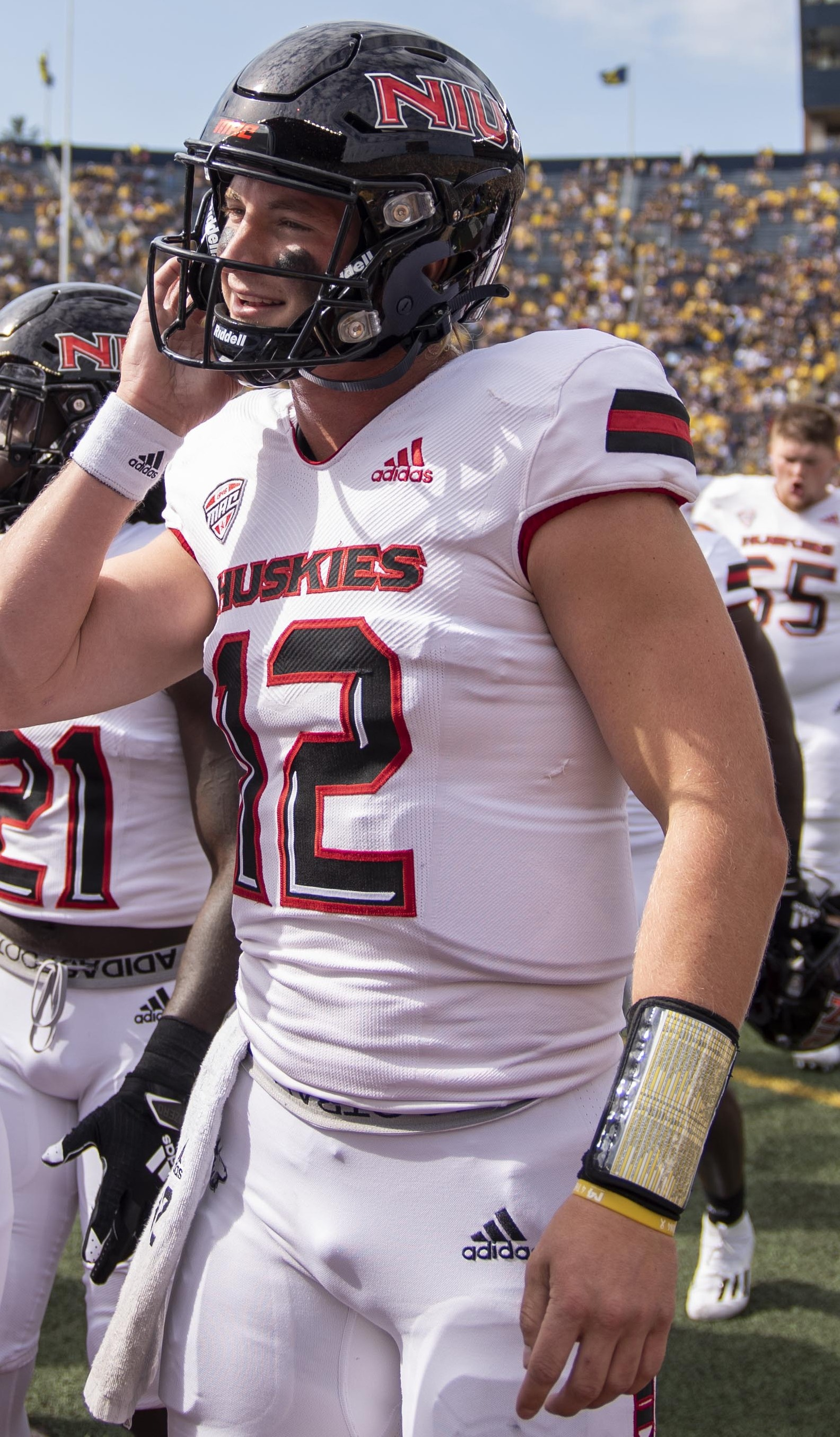
- Lombardi with the Northern Illinois Huskies in 2021

Dresden Monarchs
- Position: Quarterback
- Roster status: Active
- CFL status: American

Personal information
- Born: July 30, 1998 (age 28); Ann Arbor, Michigan, U.S.
- Listed height: 6 ft 3 in (1.91 m)
- Listed weight: 223 lb (101 kg)

Career information
- High school: Valley (West Des Moines, Iowa)
- College: Michigan State (2017–2020); Northern Illinois (2021–2023)
- NFL draft: 2024: undrafted

Career history
- Cincinnati Bengals (2024)*; Michigan Panthers (2025); Dresden Monarchs (2026–present)
- * Offseason or practice squad member only

Rocky Lombardi (born July 30, 1998) is an American professional football quarterback for the Dresden Monarchs of the German Football League (GFL). He played college football for the Michigan State Spartans and the Northern Illinois Huskies and was signed as an undrafted free agent in 2024 by the Cincinnati Bengals.

== Early life ==
Lombardi grew up in Clive, Iowa and attended Valley High School. He was rated a three-star recruit and committed to play college football at Michigan State over offers from Iowa, Iowa State, Northern Illinois, Virginia, Western Michigan, and Nebraska.

== College career ==
=== Michigan State ===
Lombardi was redshirted during his true freshman year in 2017 and was named the Scout Team Offensive Player of the Week after his performance against Iowa. During the 2018 season, he played in eight games (seven playing as a quarterback and one as a punter) and started three of them at quarterback. He finished the season with completing 68 out of 154 passing attempts for 738 yards, three touchdowns and three interceptions. During the 2019 season, he played in eight games while in limited action and finished the season with playing 51 snaps, completing 7 out of 21 passing attempts for 74 yards and two interceptions. During the 2020 season, he played in and started six games finishing the season with completing 84 out of 157 passing attempts for a career-high 1,090 yards, eight touchdowns and nine interceptions. He was named to the Manning Award Stars of the Week, the Davey O'Brien National Quarterback Award's Great 8 List and the Manning Award National Quarterback of the Week after his performance against Michigan.

On December 18, 2020, Lombardi announced that he would be entering the transfer portal. On December 27, 2020, he announced that he would be transferring to Northern Illinois.

=== Northern Illinois ===
During the 2021 season, Lombardi played in and started 13 games and finished the season with completing 200 out of 343 passing attempts for 2,597 yards with 15 touchdown passes and eight interceptions. He was named the MAC West Offensive Player of the Week for two consecutive weeks with the first being after his performance during the Week 4 game against Maine where he ran for a season-high 119 yards on 10 carries with three rushing scores. He was named the MAC West Offensive Player of the Week for the second time in the season after his performance during the Week 8 game against Central Michigan where he completed 17 out of 27 passing attempts for 348 yards with three touchdowns earning a win for the Huskies.

During the 2022 season, he played in four games because of an injury he suffered through after the Week 3 game against Vanderbilt. He finished the season with completing 50 out of 75 passing attempts for 645 yards and five touchdowns. Prior to the season, he was named to the Johnny Unitas Golden Arm Award Watchlist.

Lombardi returned for the 2023 season after receiving a medical redshirt. Prior to the season, he was named to the Reese's Senior Bowl Watchlist.

=== Statistics ===
Season	Team	Games			Passing							Rushing			
Season	Team	GP	GS	Record	Cmp	Att	Pct	Yds	TD	Int	Rtg	Att	Yds	Avg	TD
2017	Michigan State	0	0	—	Redshirted (redshirt)										
2018	Michigan State	8	3	2–1	68	154	44.2	738	3	3	86.9	38	130	3.4	0
2019	Michigan State	8	0	—	7	21	33.3	74	0	2	43.9	4	-3	-0.8	0
2020	Michigan State	6	6	2–4	84	157	53.5	1,090	8	9	117.2	32	39	1.2	0
2021	Northern Illinois	13	13	9–4	200	343	58.3	2,597	15	8	131.7	94	472	5.0	9
2022	Northern Illinois	4	3	1–2	50	75	66.7	645	5	1	158.2	6	1	0.2	1
2023	Northern Illinois	13	13	7–6	189	327	57.8	2,274	11	7	123.0	72	129	1.8	7
Career		52	38	21–17	598	1,077	55.5	7,418	42	30	120.7	246	768	3.1	17

== Professional career ==
Pre-draft measurables
Height	Weight	Arm length	Hand span	40-yard dash	10-yard split	20-yard split	20-yard shuttle	Three-cone drill	Vertical jump	Broad jump
6 ft 3 5/8 in (1.92 m)	223 lb (101 kg)	31 1/8 in (0.79 m)	9 1/8 in (0.23 m)	4.70 s	1.57 s	2.69 s	4.47 s	7.25 s	35.0 in (0.89 m)	9 ft 10 in (3.00 m)
All values from Pro Day

=== Cincinnati Bengals ===
On April 27, 2024, Lombardi signed as an undrafted free agent with the Cincinnati Bengals. Lombardi was waived by the Bengals on August 23.

=== Michigan Panthers ===
Lombardi was selected by the Michigan Panthers in the fifth round of the 2024 UFL draft on July 17. He signed with the Panthers on December 23.

On January 30, 2026, Lombardi signed to the Negotiation list with the Montreal Alouettes of the Canadian Football League (CFL).

=== Dresden Monarchs ===
On March 6, 2026, Lombardi signed with the Dresden Monarchs of the German Football League.

On October 3rd, 2026, Lombardi led the Monarchs to their second German Bowl victory over the Potsdam Royals, winning the MVP of the game.

== UFL career statistics ==
Year	Team	Games			Passing									Rushing				
Year	Team	GP	GS	Record	Cmp	Att	Pct	Yds	Y/A	Lng	TD	Int	Rtg	Att	Yds	Avg	Lng	TD
2025	MICH	2	1	0–1	8	18	44.4	61	3.4	13	0	1	30.1	3	30	10.0	17	0
Career		2	1	0–1	8	18	44.4	61	3.4	13	0	1	30.1	3	30	10.0	17	0

== Personal life ==
Lombardi is the son of football coach Tony Lombardi and is the grandson of the late Bob Lombardi. His younger brother Beau played college football for the Army Black Knights.
