= Butch Jones =

American football coach (born 1968)

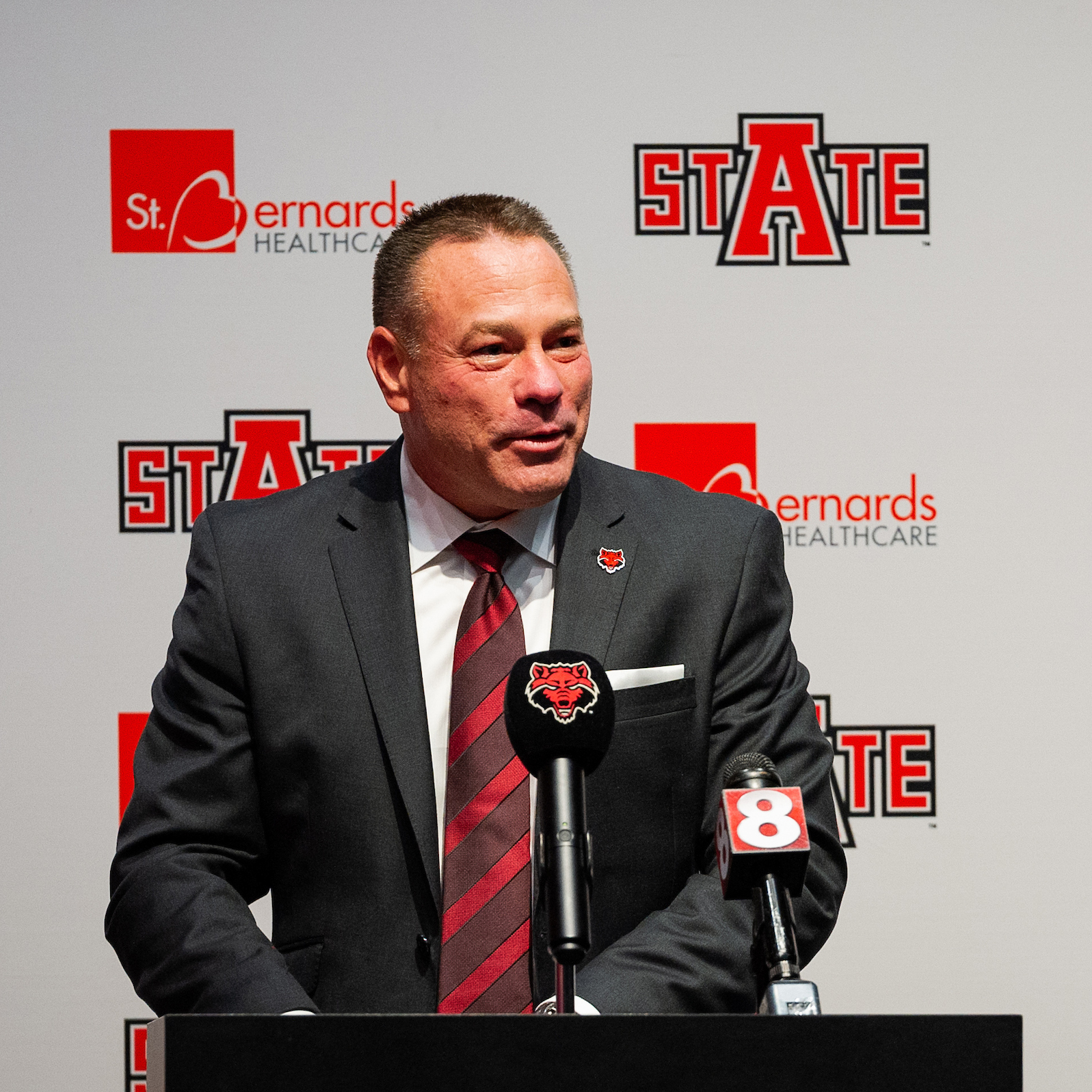
- Jones is announced as head coach of Arkansas State University football during a press conference.

Biographical details
- Born: January 17, 1968 (age 58); Saugatuck, Michigan, U.S.

Playing career
- 1987–1989: Ferris State
- Positions: Running back, wide receiver, cornerback

Coaching career (HC unless noted)
- 1987–1989: Tampa Bay Buccaneers (intern)
- 1990–1992: Rutgers (GA)
- 1993–1994: Wilkes (OC)
- 1995: Ferris State (RB)
- 1996–1997: Ferris State (OC)
- 1998: Central Michigan (TE)
- 1999: Central Michigan (WR)
- 2000: Central Michigan (RB)
- 2001–2003: Central Michigan (OC)
- 2004: Central Michigan (RB)
- 2005–2006: West Virginia (WR)
- 2007–2009: Central Michigan
- 2010–2012: Cincinnati
- 2013–2017: Tennessee
- 2018–2020: Alabama (OA)
- 2021–2026: Arkansas State

Administrative career (AD unless noted)
- 2020: Alabama (asst. to HC)

Head coaching record
- Overall: 114–97
- Bowls: 6–3

Accomplishments and honors

Championships
- 2 MAC (2007, 2009); 2 Big East (2011, 2012)

Awards
- Big East Coach of the Year (2011)

Lyle Allen "Butch" Jones Jr. (born January 17, 1968) is an American football coach. He was most recently the head coach at Arkansas State University. Jones previously served as a special assistant to the head coach and offensive analyst at the University of Alabama from 2018 to 2020, the head coach at the University of Tennessee from 2013 to 2017, the University of Cincinnati from 2010 to 2012, and Central Michigan University from 2007 to 2009. A Michigan native, he played college football at Ferris State University as a running back and wide receiver.

== Coaching career ==
=== Assistant coaching career ===
From 1987 to 1989, Jones was an intern for the Tampa Bay Buccaneers of the National Football League (NFL), assisting the staff of head coach Ray Perkins. Upon his graduation from Ferris State University in 1990, Jones joined the defensive staff of Rutgers as a graduate assistant. The new head coach of Rutgers at that time, Doug Graber, had previously worked as the defensive coordinator for the Buccaneers, and was familiar with Jones. Two years later, Jones took a job as offensive coordinator at Wilkes University, helping to guide the team deep into the Division III playoffs. In 1995, he returned to his alma mater, Ferris State, to serve in the offensive coordinator role. He led Ferris State to the top-ranked offense nationally for three straight years.

In 1998, Jones arrived at Central Michigan, where he coached tight ends for one year, running backs for two more, and was the offensive playcaller from 2002 to 2004. Initially hired as an assistant by head coach Dick Flynn, he was retained by new CMU head coaches Mike DeBord in 2000, and Brian Kelly in 2004. He left the school in 2005 to work for Rich Rodriguez and coach wide receivers at West Virginia University, helping the school reach back-to-back top 10 seasons.

In a 2013 interview with Cityview magazine in Knoxville, Jones listed Perkins, Graber, DeBord, Rodriguez, and Kelly as influences on his coaching career.

=== Central Michigan ===
Jones returned to Central Michigan as head coach in 2007. In his first year, he posted an 8–5 overall record and a 7–1 conference record. Jones ended two streaks that had haunted his predecessors. On September 29, 2007, the Chippewas beat Northern Illinois University, which was the first win over Northern Illinois going back to 1998. On November 6, 2007, CMU beat its chief rival, Western Michigan, at its home field of Waldo Stadium for the first time since 1993. He guided CMU to the MAC title at Ford Field in Detroit against Miami (Ohio), and led the team to its second consecutive Motor City Bowl. He was only the ninth football coach in Mid-American Conference history to win the championship in his first season. In 2008, a 31–24 loss to Ball State on November 19 derailed the Chippewas' MAC title hopes, but CMU earned a trip to a third consecutive Motor City Bowl. In 2009, he guided the Chippewas to their third MAC Championship in four years after an 8–0 MAC schedule, the first time in school history the Chippewas went undefeated in the MAC. CMU completed its run with a 20–10 win against Ohio in the MAC title game at Ford Field. He left CMU with a 27–13 overall record and 20–3 MAC record. He did not win a bowl game during his time at Central Michigan, though his team won the 2009 bowl game against Troy, 44–41.

=== Cincinnati ===
On December 16, 2009, Jones was named as the head coach at the University of Cincinnati. He replaced Brian Kelly, who left to become the head coach at Notre Dame. Jones had previously replaced Kelly at Central Michigan.

Jones led the Bearcats to records of 4–8 in 2010 and 10–3 in 2011, including a Big East championship, a Liberty Bowl victory (31–24 over Vanderbilt), and he was named Big East Coach of the Year. Also in 2011, Cincinnati was the only program to win both its conference championship as well as the league's team academic award.

He led the Bearcats to a 9–3 regular season record in 2012, leading them to the Belk Bowl in Charlotte to play against Duke University. Twenty days prior to the bowl game, on December 7, 2012, Jones announced to the team that he would be resigning to accept the job as head coach at the University of Tennessee, after declining offers from Colorado, Purdue, and others. He was required to pay $1.4 million to buy out his Cincinnati contract extension, signed on January 23, 2012, that went through the 2017 season.

=== Tennessee ===
On December 7, 2012, Jones was hired as the head coach of the Tennessee Volunteers.

Jones made his coaching debut on August 31, 2013, in Neyland Stadium against the FCS Austin Peay Governors, resulting in a 45–0 Tennessee victory. Tennessee earned its 800th victory in program history and became only the eighth school in the nation to reach that plateau after Michigan, Texas, Notre Dame, Nebraska, Ohio State, Oklahoma, and Alabama.

On October 19, 2013, Jones led the Vols to a win over No. 11 South Carolina Gamecocks at Neyland Stadium. This was widely considered Jones's first signature win. Jones's second signature win came on November 1, 2014, at Williams-Brice Stadium against the South Carolina Gamecocks. The Vols trailed 42–28 with less than five minutes remaining and came back to win 45–42 in overtime.

With the youngest roster in the FBS in 2014, Jones and the Vols finished the season with a record of 6–6 with bowl eligibility–the best regular season record and the first bowl game appearance the team had since the 2010 season, which was a 6–7 finish.

On January 2, 2015, Jones led Tennessee to their first bowl win since 2007, in the TaxSlayer Bowl.

During the 2015 season, Jones's team finally defeated No. 19 Georgia after five straight losses to the team in their annual rivalry. In most of the first half, the Vols trailed 24–3, until Tennessee came back and put up 28 unanswered points late in the second quarter and all through the third quarter. The Vols won 38–31, giving Jones his third signature win. To conclude the 2015 season, Jones's Vols defeated the Northwestern Wildcats by a score of 45–6 on January 1, 2016, in the Outback Bowl.

In 2016, Jones led the Vols to another 9–4 campaign and second-place finish in the SEC East. The season saw Tennessee snap rival Florida's 11-game winning streak over the Vols with a 38–28 victory on September 24. The following week, the Vols defeated the Georgia Bulldogs in dramatic fashion via a game-ending Hail Mary pass by quarterback Joshua Dobbs. Despite these wins, the Vols struggled down the stretch with losses to South Carolina and Vanderbilt. The season finished with a 38–24 victory over Nebraska in the 2016 Music City Bowl on December 30. While the Volunteers did not win the SEC championship, a proud Jones stated of his senior class: ""They've won the biggest championship – that's the championship of life."

In 2017, Jones's team saw a significant turnover of starting players, and the results were not positive. After a 42–41 2OT victory over Georgia Tech in the season opener and a 42–7 win over Indiana State, the season started to shift downward. In the annual rivalry game against Florida, a last-second 26–20 loss on a game-winning Hail Mary from quarterback Feleipe Franks was a harbinger for the remaining conference games. In the next game, in a hard-fought win over Massachusetts, the Volunteers struggled until the end of the game. The next game, a 41–0 loss to #7 Georgia, was the worst shutout loss in Neyland Stadium history. The Volunteers lost the next conference game, a lethargic 15–9 performance against South Carolina, to start 0–3 in the SEC. The Vols' next game was a 45–7 loss to #1 Alabama, the 11th straight victory for the longtime rivals. The Volunteers lost 29–26 to Kentucky in the next game for only the second time in the last 33 meetings between the two programs.

Jones was fired on November 12, 2017. The decision came following a 50–17 loss to Missouri the previous day, which left Tennessee at a 4–6 record for the season and 0–6 in conference. The Vols' loss to the Tigers was their worst loss to an unranked opponent in the AP Poll era. He became the second coach in the SEC to be ousted mid-season during 2017, after Jim McElwain was pushed out at Florida two weeks prior. His interim replacement was Brady Hoke, who had worked as the assistant head coach and defensive line coach during the 2017 season. Jeremy Pruitt was his permanent replacement. The 2017 Vols finished 4–8, the worst season in school history and still the worst on-field record in school history.

=== Alabama ===
After his termination at the University of Tennessee, Jones was hired by the University of Alabama to be an offensive analyst for the football team.

On December 10, 2018, Jones agreed to join the Maryland Terrapins under new head football coach Mike Locksley, as associate head coach and tight ends coach. In mid-January 2019, it was reported that Jones would remain at Alabama. Jones became the special assistant to the head coach in February 2020.

=== Arkansas State ===
On December 12, 2020, Jones was hired to become the 34th head coach at Arkansas State University, replacing Blake Anderson, who left Arkansas State to become the head coach at Utah State University. In the 2021 season, Jones went 2–10. The two wins for the Red Wolves marked the fewest in a single season since 2001. In the 2022 season, Jones led the team to a 3–9 mark. In the 2023 season, Jones led the team to a 6–6 regular season mark and a berth in the Camellia Bowl. The Red Wolves lost to Northern Illinois 21–19 in the bowl game. In the 2024 season, he led the team to a 7–5 regular season mark. He led the team to a 38–31 win over Bowling Green in the 68 Ventures Bowl. In the 2025 season, he led the Red Wolves to a 6–6 regular season record. Arkansas State defeated Missouri State 34–28 in the Xbox Bowl.

On November 16, 2026, Jones was fired by Arkansas State after 6 seasons. Finishing with a 30-43 record.

== Personal life ==
Jones and his wife, Barb, have three sons.

== Head coaching record ==
Year	Team	Overall	Conference	Standing	Bowl/playoffs	Coaches^{#}	AP^{°}
Central Michigan Chippewas (Mid-American Conference) (2007–2009)
2007	Central Michigan	8–6	6–1	1st (West)	L Motor City		
2008	Central Michigan	8–5	6–2	T–2nd (West)	L Motor City		
2009	Central Michigan	11–2	8–0	1st (West)	GMAC*	24	23
Central Michigan:		27–13	20–3	*resigned prior to bowl game			
Cincinnati Bearcats (Big East Conference) (2010–2012)
2010	Cincinnati	4–8	2–5	7th			
2011	Cincinnati	10–3	5–2	T–1st	W Liberty	21	25
2012	Cincinnati	9–3	5–2	T–1st	Belk*	22	
Cincinnati:		23–14	12–9	*resigned prior to bowl game			
Tennessee Volunteers (Southeastern Conference) (2013–2017)
2013	Tennessee	5–7	2–6	6th (Eastern)			
2014	Tennessee	7–6	3–5	T–4th (Eastern)	W TaxSlayer		
2015	Tennessee	9–4	5–3	T–2nd (Eastern)	W Outback	23	22
2016	Tennessee	9–4	4–4	T–2nd (Eastern)	W Music City	24	22
2017	Tennessee	4–6 (Note: Jones was fired by Tennessee prior to the LSU game.)	0–6	(Eastern)			
Tennessee:		34–27	14–24				
Arkansas State Red Wolves (Sun Belt Conference) (2021–2026)
2021	Arkansas State	2–10	1–7	5th (West)			
2022	Arkansas State	3–9	1–7	7th (West)			
2023	Arkansas State	6–7	4–4	T–2nd (West)	L Camellia		
2024	Arkansas State	8–5	5–3	T–2nd (West)	W 68 Ventures		
2025	Arkansas State	7–6	5–3	T–2nd (West)	W Xbox		
2026	Arkansas State	4–6 (Note: Arkansas State fired Jones with two games remaining)	2–4				
Arkansas State:		30–43	18–28				
Total:		114–97					
National championship Conference title Conference division title or championship game berth
^{#}Rankings from final Coaches Poll.; ^{°}Rankings from final AP Poll.
