= 2022 Lamar Cardinals football team =

American college football season

2022 Lamar Cardinals football
- Conference: Southland Conference
- Record: 1–10 (1–5 Southalnd)
- Head coach: Blane Morgan (3rd season)
- Co-offensive coordinators: Patrick Covington (3rd season); Ron Antoine (3rd season)
- Offensive scheme: Multiple
- Defensive coordinator: Matt Weikert (3rd season)
- Base defense: 3–4
- Home stadium: Provost Umphrey Stadium

2022 Southland Conference football standings
	Conf.			Overall
Team	W		L	W		L
No. 12 Southeastern Louisiana +^	5	–	1	9	–	4
No. 3 Incarnate Word +^	5	–	1	12	–	2
Northwestern State	4	–	2	4	–	7
Nicholls	3	–	3	3	–	8
Texas A&M–Commerce *	3	–	3	5	–	6
McNeese	2	–	4	4	–	7
Houston Christian	1	–	5	2	–	9
Lamar	1	–	5	1	–	10
+ – Conference co-champions; ^ – FCS playoff participant; * – Texas A&M–Commerce ineligible for FCS postseason play due to transition from NCAA Division II; Rankings from STATS Poll

The 2022 Lamar Cardinals football team represented Lamar University in the 2022 NCAA Division I FCS football season. The Cardinals played their home games at Provost Umphrey Stadium in Beaumont, Texas, United States, and competed in the Southland Conference following an early return from the Western Athletic Conference. On July 11, 2022, Lamar announced that they would take an early transition back to the Southland Conference after the athletic department announced back in April 2022 a transition back to the conference for the 2023 season.

The Cardinals finished the season with a 1–10 overall record, and were 1–5 in Southland Conference play. They were led by third-year head coach Blane Morgan. Their October 29 conference victory over the Nicholls Colonels ended a 15-game losing streak dating back to September 25, 2021.

== Schedule ==
Date	Time	Opponent	Site	TV	Result	Attendance
September 1	7:00 p.m.	at Abilene Christian*	Anthony Field at Wildcat Stadium; Abilene, TX	ESPN+	L 14–28	5,413
September 10	6:00 p.m.	at SMU*	Gerald J. Ford Stadium; Dallas, TX	ESPN+	L 45-16	26,509
September 17	6:00 p.m.	Northern Colorado*	Provost Umphrey Stadium; Beaumont, TX	ESPN+	L 14–21	4,933
September 24	3:30 p.m.	at Northwestern State	Harry Turpin Stadium; Natchitoches, LA	ESPN+	L 27–3	4,371
October 1	3:00 p.m.	Houston Christian^{†}	Provost Umphrey Stadium; Beaumont, TX	ESPN+	L 34–3	5,473
October 8	4:00 p.m.	at No. 10 Incarnate Word	Gayle and Tom Benson Stadium; San Antonio, TX	ESPN3	L 17–56	1,937
October 22	4:00 p.m.	Prairie View A&M*	Provost Umphrey Stadium; Beaumont, TX	ESPN3	L 21–54	6,627
October 29	3:00 p.m.	Nicholls	Provost Umphrey Stadium; Beaumont, TX	ESPN3	W 24–17	2,916
November 5	3:00 p.m.	Southeastern Louisiana	Provost Umphrey Stadium; Beaumont, TX	ESPN3	L 31–47	5,396
November 12	3:00 p.m.	at New Mexico State*	Aggie Memorial Stadium; Las Cruces, NM	FloSports	L 14–51	8,367
November 19	7:00 p.m.	at McNeese	Cowboy Stadium; Lake Charles, LA (Battle of the Border)	ESPN+	L 20–24	6,901
*Non-conference game; ^{†}Homecoming; Rankings from STATS Poll released prior to the game; All times are in Central time

== Preseason ==
=== Preseason poll ===
The Southland Conference released their preseason poll on July 20, 2022. The Cardinals were picked to finish seventh in the conference.

== Game summaries ==
=== Abilene Christian ===
	1	2	3	4	Total
Cardinals	14	0	0	0	14
Wildcats	7	14	0	7	28

Statistics

Statistics	Lamar	Abilene Christian
First downs	7	25
Total yards	272	444
Rushing yards	68	186
Passing yards	204	258
Turnovers	0	0
Time of possession	19:40	40:20

Team	Category	Player	Statistics
Lamar	Passing	Mike Chandler	8-24; 204 yards; long 75 yards
Lamar	Rushing	Khalan Griffin	8 attempts; 39 yards; long 21 yards
Lamar	Receiving	Sevonne Rhea	3 receptions; 113 yards; long 70 yards
Abilene Christian	Passing	Maverick McIvor	22–38; 258 yards; long 30 yards
Abilene Christian	Rushing	Rovaughn Banks Jr.	18 attempts; 78 yards; long 20 yards
Abilene Christian	Receiving	Kendall Catalon	7 receptions; 119 yards; long 30 yards

=== SMU ===
	1	2	3	4	Total
Cardinals	0	10	3	3	16
Mustangs	14	10	14	7	45

Statistics

Statistics	Lamar	SMU
First downs	16	23
Total yards	252	453
Rushing yards	104	208
Passing yards	148	245
Turnovers	(2) 19 yards	(1) 1 yard
Time of possession	35:45	24:15

Team	Category	Player	Statistics
Lamar	Passing	Mike Chandler	10–25; 127 yards; long 21 yards
Lamar	Rushing	Khalan Griffin	13 attempts; 32 yards; long 8 yards
Lamar	Receiving	Jalen Dummett	5 receptions; 58 yards; long 20 yards
SMU	Passing	Tanner Mordecai	18–31; 212 yards; long 33 yards
SMU	Rushing	Velton Gardner	11 attempts; 100 yards; long 40 yards
SMU	Receiving	Rashee Rice	9 receptions; 132 yards; long 33 yards

=== Northern Colorado ===
	1	2	3	4	Total
Bears	7	7	7	0	21
Cardinals	0	7	7	0	14

Statistics

Statistics	Northern Colorado	Lamar
First downs	19	21
Total yards	270	299
Rushing yards	52	217
Passing yards	218	82
Turnovers	3	0
Time of possession	27:39	32:21

Team	Category	Player	Statistics
Northern Colorado	Passing	Jacob Sirmon	16/28; 218 total yards; 43 long
Northern Colorado	Rushing	David Afari	7 attempts; 41 yards; 11 long
Northern Colorado	Receiving	Trevis Graham	5 receptions; 97 total yards; 43 long
Lamar	Passing	Nick Yockey	10/11; 71 total yards; 16 long
Lamar	Rushing	Khalan Griffin	10 attempts; 66 total yards; 10 yards long
Lamar	Receiving	Sevonne Rhea	3 receptions; 36 yards; 16 yards long

=== Northwestern State ===
	1	2	3	4	Total
Cardinals	10	0	3	14	27
Demons	0	21	14	0	35

Statistics

Statistics	Lamar	Northwestern State
First downs	24	20
Total yards	394	545
Rushing yards	92	179
Passing yards	302	366
Turnovers	1	2
Time of possession		

Team	Category	Player	Statistics
Lamar	Passing	Nick Yockney	19/39-1; 255 total yards; longest - 49 yards
Lamar	Rushing	Damashja Harris	11 attempts; 41 total yards; 13 long
Lamar	Receiving	Sevonne Rhea	2 receptions; 64 total yards; 41 long
Northwestern State	Passing	Zachary Clement	28/49-1; 366 total yards; 80 long
Northwestern State	Rushing	Kenneth Lacy	4 attempts; 83 yards; 55 long; 1 TD
Northwestern State	Receiving	Javon Antonio	9 receptions; 127 total yards; 49 long; 2 TDs

=== Houston Christian ===
	1	2	3	4	Total
Huskies	0	24	13	0	37
Cardinals	0	7	7	20	34

Statistics

Statistics	Houston Christian	Lamar
First downs	17	18
Total yards	323	376
Rushing yards	66	119
Passing yards	257	257
Turnovers	0	2
Time of possession	29:05	30:55

Team	Category	Player	Statistics
Houston Christian	Passing	Justin Fomby	31/45; 249 yards total; 40 long
Houston Christian	Rushing	Nate Livingston	6 attempts; 33 yards total; 11 long
Houston Christian	Receiving	Karl Reynolds	9 receptions; 109 yards total; 40 long
Lamar	Passing	Mike Chandler	11/27; 239 total yards; 52 yards long
Lamar	Rushing	Mike Chandler	13 attempts; 59 yards total; 13 long
Lamar	Receiving	Kyndon Fuselier	3 receptions; 104 yards total; 44 long

=== No. 10 Incarnate Word ===
	1	2	3	4	Total
Cardinals (LU)	0	10	0	7	17
No. 10 Cardinals (UIW)	35	21	0	0	56

Statistics

Statistics	Lamar	Incarnate Word
First downs	19	26
Total yards	446	609
Rushing yards	200	148
Passing yards	246	461
Turnovers	2	1
Time of possession	37:12	22:48

Team	Category	Player	Statistics
Lamar	Passing	Mike Chandler	14/28; 182 yards; long 66
Lamar	Rushing	R.J. Carver	9 attempts; 52 yards; long 22
Lamar	Receiving	Andre Dennis	1 reception; 66 yards
Incarnate Word	Passing	Lindsey Scott	23/26; 401 yards; long 83
Incarnate Word	Rushing	Isaiah Robinson	11 attempts; 66 yards; long 24
Incarnate Word	Receiving	Darian Chaffin	4 receptions; 115 yards; long 69

=== Prairie View A&M ===
	1	2	3	4	Total
Panthers	13	21	14	6	54
Cardinals	7	14	0	0	21

Statistics

Statistics	Prairie View A&M	Lamar
First downs	25	24
Total yards	580	430
Rushing yards	401	358
Passing yards	179	72
Turnovers	0	0
Time of possession	23:41	36:19

Team	Category	Player	Statistics
Prairie View A&M	Passing	Trazon Connley	15/21; 179 yards; long 28
Prairie View A&M	Rushing	Jaden Stewart	9 attempts; 141 total yards; longest 56 yards
Prairie View A&M	Receiving	Chris Herron	6 receptions; 94 total yards; longest 28
Lamar	Passing	Michael Chandler	7/16; 43 total yards; longest 11 yards; 1 interception
Lamar	Rushing	Khalan Griffin	17 attempts; 119 total yards; longest 31 yards
Lamar	Receiving	Andre Dennis	2 receptions; 29 yards total; longest 22 yards

=== Nicholls ===
	1	2	3	4	Total
Colonels	0	3	14	0	17
Cardinals	0	14	7	3	24

Statistics

Statistics	Nicholls	Lamar
First downs	23	16
Total yards	365	344
Rushing yards	170	267
Passing yards	195	77
Turnovers	0	0
Time of possession	19:24	30:36

Team	Category	Player	Statistics
Nicholls	Passing	Kohen Granier	18/29; 148 total yards; long 67 yards
Nicholls	Rushing	Julien Gums	21 attempts; 100 total yards; long 10 yards
Nicholls	Receiving	David Robinson	3 receptions; 80 yards; long 67 yards
Lamar	Passing	Michael Chandler	6/13; 77 yards total; long 25 yards
Lamar	Rushing	Khalan Griffin	17 attempts; 134 total yards; long 35 yards
Lamar	Receiving	Sevonne Rhea	3 receptions; 31 total yards; long 15 yards

=== Southeastern Louisiana ===
	1	2	3	4	Total
Lions	14	10	10	13	47
Cardinals	0	17	7	7	31

Statistics

Statistics	Southeastern Louisiana	Lamar
First downs	28	16
Total yards	527	415
Rushing yards	204	164
Passing yards	323	251
Turnovers	2	1
Time of possession	28:52	31:08

Team	Category	Player	Statistics
Southeastern Louisiana	Passing	Cephus Johnson, III	19–27; 179 yards; long 38 yards
Southeastern Louisiana	Rushing	Carlos Washington Jr.	18 attempts; 68 yards total; long 15 yards
Southeastern Louisiana	Receiving	Maurice Massey	10 receptions; 158 yards total; long 38 yards
Lamar	Passing	Michael Chandler	16–34; 251 yards; long 62 yards
Lamar	Rushing	Khalan Griffin	11 attempts; 84 yards total; long 40 yards
Lamar	Receiving	Andre Dennis	4 receptions; 108 yards total; long 62 yards

=== New Mexico State ===
	1	2	3	4	Total
Cardinals	0	0	7	7	14
Aggies	17	20	14	0	51

Statistics

Statistics	Lamar	New Mexico State
First downs	14	22
Total yards	247	433
Rushing yards	125	187
Passing yards	122	246
Turnovers	3	0
Time of possession	25:22	29:37

Team	Category	Player	Statistics
Lamar	Passing	Nick Yockey	7–13; 89 yards; long 35 yards
Lamar	Rushing	Hunter Batten	3 attempts; 44 total yards; long 38 yards
Lamar	Receiving	Devyn Gibbs	3 receptions; 47 total yards; long 23 yards
New Mexico State	Passing	Diego Pavia	14–19; 154 yards; long 30 yards
New Mexico State	Rushing	Diego Pavia	8 attempts; 81 total yards; long 27 yards
New Mexico State	Receiving	Ta'ir Brooks	2 receptions; 70 total yards; long 62 yards

=== McNeese ===
	1	2	3	4	Total
Cardinals	0	17	3	0	20
Cowboys	0	21	0	3	24

Statistics

Statistics	Lamar	McNeese
First downs	19	13
Total yards	369	314
Rushing yards	219	268
Passing yards	150	46
Turnovers	2	0
Time of possession	35:47	24:13

Team	Category	Player	Statistics
Lamar	Passing	Nick Yockey	19–27; 150 total yards; long 18 yards
Lamar	Rushing	Major Bowden	11 attempts; 92 total yards; long 30 yards
Lamar	Receiving	Major Bowden	2 receptions; 35 total yards; long 18 yards
McNeese	Passing	Ryan Roberts	6–14; 46 yards total; long 14 yards
McNeese	Rushing	Deonata McMahon	20 attempts; 241 total yards; long 79 yards
McNeese	Receiving	Jon McCall	2 receptions; 22 total yards; long 14 yards

== Personnel ==
=== Roster ===
2022 Lamar Cardinals football team roster
Players
Coaches
Offense

Pos.	#	Name	Class
RB	2	Damashja Harris	Fr
WR	3	Izaha Jones	Fr
WR	4	Cameron George	So
WR	5	Jalen Dummett	Sr
RB	6	Khalin Griffin	So
WR	7	Sevonne Rhea	So
WR	8	Tyrique Carter	So
QB	9	Mike Chandler	Fr
WR	10	Dozie Ifeadi	So
TE	11	Nathan Gaskamp	Sr
QB	12	Jakolby Longino	Fr
QB	13	Sharmon Rester	Fr
WR	14	Andre Dennis	Fr
TE	15	Jacoby Davis	Jr
QB	16	Kendrick Malone	Fr
WR	17	Keshaun Lazard	Fr
QB	18	Daelyn Williams	Fr
QB	19	Nick Yockey	Jr
RB	20	Major Bowden	Fr
RB	24	R J Carver	Fr
WR	29	Javonta Thomas	Fr
RB	36	Hunter Batten	Sr
WR	37	Jace Burns	Fr
RB	38	Jamichael Foxall	Fr
RB	44	Junior Ombati	Fr
OL	51	Donovan Jordan	Fr
OL	60	John Hester	Fr
OL	61	Kade Verden	Fr
OL	62	Devin Fregia	Fr
OL	63	Tim Carlson	Fr
OL	64	Sebastian Carter	Fr
OL	65	Jacob Dicharry	So
OL	66	Ja'Darrius Winans	So
OL	67	Marcus Harbert	Fr
OL	68	Ethan Wallace	Fr
OL	69	Brayden Clinton	Fr
OL	70	Preston Yarber	Fr
OL	71	Jevale Roberson	So
OL	72	Marques Mayo	Fr
OL	73	Jacob Bayer	So
OL	74	B J Williams	So
OL	75	Carter Murray	Fr
OL	76	Drew Moss	So
OL	77	Reginald Burks	Fr
OL	78	Devon King	So
WR	80	Kyndon Fuselier	Fr
TE	81	Devyn Gibbs	Fr
WR	82	Jayden Boyd	Fr
WR	83	Bo Baker	Fr
TE	84	Sterling Herrington	So
WR	86	David Jefferson	Fr
TE	87	Kameron Ladia	Fr
TE	88	Jayden Slater	Fr

Defense

Pos.	#	Name	Class
LB	2	Vencent Rockwell	So
DB	3	Ramond Stevens	So
DE	4	Jaymond Jackson	So
DB	5	Damian Alexander	So
DB	6	DeMarco Roberts	So
LB	7	Tyler Jackson	Jr
LB	8	Caleb Arnold	So
LB	10	Jase Williams	Fr
DB	11	Canden Grogan	Fr
DB	12	Antorius Hambric, Jr.	So
DB	13	Austin Goffney	Sr
DB	14	Dwight Davis	Fr
LB	15	Darion White	Fr
LB	16	Zyon Clark	Fr
LB	17	Brayden Faulkner	Fr
DB	20	Kristian Pugh	Fr
LB	21	Seth Johnson	So
DB	22	Jaden Hardin	Fr
DB	23	Aaron King	Fr
LB	25	Blaise Tita	Fr
LB	26	Ryan Harris	Fr
DB	30	Du'Wayne Paulhill, Jr	Fr
DB	33	Samuel Scaife IV	So
LB	34	Ian Box	Fr
LB	35	Breylon Charles	So
LB	40	Jalen Freeman	So
LB	41	Kendal Rowen	Fr
DE	42	Jacob Ferree	Fr
DS	43	Bo Dawson	Fr
DE	48	Njenge
DE	49	Dekalen Goodson	Jr
LB	52	Blake Gotcher	So
LB	53	Braden Courtney	Fr
LB	54	Robert Bonar	Fr
LB	55	Dawson Exline	Fr
DL	57	Jonovan Dennis	Fr
DL	79	Reggie Brooks	Fr
DL	90	Jayden Madkins	Fr
DL	91	Jalen Smith	Fr
DL	92	Colin Hedges	Fr
DL	93	Emmanuel Oguns	Fr
DL	94	Jack McCarthy	So
DL	96	Ayden Bell	So
DL	97	Byron Mathis	So
DL	99	Caleb Williams	So

Special teams

Pos.	#	Name	Class
K/P	32	Chris Esqueda	So
K/P	39	Colby Sessums	Fr
K	46	Alfonso Deleon	Jr
DS	43	Beau Dawson	Fr
DS	50	Luke Wallis	Jr

Head coach

Blane Morgan

Coordinators/assistant coaches

- Patrick Covington, Off Coord and OL
- Matt Weikert, Def Coord and interior LBs
- Scott Theisen Special teams / OLB's
- Coby Gipson, Recruiting coord and RBs
- Jackson Eskierka, QBs
- Wayne Cordova, Safeties
- Marshall Mann, Cornerbacks
- Taylor Godinet, DLs
- David Mertens, Tight ends
- Tyler Bates, Running backs

Legend

- (C) Team captain
- (S) Suspended
- (I) Ineligible
- Injured
- Redshirt

Roster
Last update: September 1, 2021

=== Recruiting ===
Lamar signed 25 high school recruits with 16 signed on Early Signing Day and 9 added on National Signing Day.

College recruiting information
Name	Hometown	School	Height	Weight	40^{‡}	Commit date
Bo Baker; ATH	Ravenna, TX	Bells High School	5 ft 11 in (1.80 m)	174 lb (79 kg)	–	
Bo Baker; ATH	Recruit ratings: No ratings found					
James Major Bowden; RB	Waco, TX	China Spring High School	5 ft 9 in (1.75 m)	180 lb (82 kg)	–	
James Major Bowden; RB	Recruit ratings: No ratings found					
Ian Box; OLB	Seguin, TX	Seguin High School	6 ft 2 in (1.88 m)	235 lb (107 kg)	–	
Ian Box; OLB	Recruit ratings: No ratings found					
Jayden Boyd; WR	Tatum, TX	Tatum High School	6 ft 2 in (1.88 m)	185 lb (84 kg)	–	
Jayden Boyd; WR	Recruit ratings: Rivals: 247Sports:					
Reginald Burks; OL	Lake Charles, LA	Lake Charles College Prep	6 ft 2 in (1.88 m)	290 lb (130 kg)	–	
Reginald Burks; OL	Recruit ratings: Rivals:					
Sabastian Carter; OL	Teague, TX	Teague High School	6 ft 4 in (1.93 m)	255 lb (116 kg)		
Sabastian Carter; OL	Recruit ratings: No ratings found					
Zyon Clark; DB	Anahuac, TX	Anahuac High School	6 ft 3 in (1.91 m)	180 lb (82 kg)	–	
Zyon Clark; DB	Recruit ratings: No ratings found					
Andre Dennis; WR	Beaumont, TX	West Brook High School	6 ft 1 in (1.85 m)	185 lb (84 kg)	–	
Andre Dennis; WR	Recruit ratings: No ratings found					
Brayden Faulkner; LB	Waco, TX	China Spring High School	6 ft 0 in (1.83 m)	208 lb (94 kg)	–	
Brayden Faulkner; LB	Recruit ratings: No ratings found					
Jacob Ferree; DE	League City, TX	Clear Springs High School	6 ft 2 in (1.88 m)	227 lb (103 kg)	–	
Jacob Ferree; DE	Recruit ratings: No ratings found					
Ryan Harris; OLB	Beckville, TX	Beckville High School	6 ft 3 in (1.91 m)	200 lb (91 kg)	–	
Ryan Harris; OLB	Recruit ratings: No ratings found					
Spencer Henslee; TE	Humble, TX	Atascocita High School	6 ft 4 in (1.93 m)	222 lb (101 kg)	–	
Spencer Henslee; TE	Recruit ratings: No ratings found					
John Hester; OL	Hawkins, TX	Hawkins High School	6 ft 4 in (1.93 m)	287 lb (130 kg)	–	
John Hester; OL	Recruit ratings: No ratings found					
Izaha Jones; WR	Normangee, TX	Normangee High School	6 ft 2 in (1.88 m)	175 lb (79 kg)	–	
Izaha Jones; WR	Recruit ratings: No ratings found					
Donovan Jordan; OL	Flint, TX	Tyler Legacy High School	6 ft 3 in (1.91 m)	290 lb (130 kg)	–	
Donovan Jordan; OL	Recruit ratings: No ratings found					
Aaron King; CB	Garland, TX	Garland High School	5 ft 10 in (1.78 m)	170 lb (77 kg)	–	
Aaron King; CB	Recruit ratings: 247Sports:					
Jayden Madkins; DL	Pearland, TX	Shadow Creek High School	6 ft 1 in (1.85 m)	297 lb (135 kg)	–	
Jayden Madkins; DL	Recruit ratings: No ratings found					
Du'Wayne Paulhill, Jr. S	Bryan, TX	Bryan High School	6 ft 1 in (1.85 m)	197 lb (89 kg)	–	
Du'Wayne Paulhill, Jr. S	Recruit ratings: No ratings found					
Khristian Pugh; S	Beaumont, TX	West Brook High School	5 ft 11 in (1.80 m)	160 lb (73 kg)	–	
Khristian Pugh; S	Recruit ratings: No ratings found					
Sharmon Rester; QB	El Dorado, AR	El Dorado High School	5 ft 10 in (1.78 m)	190 lb (86 kg)	–	
Sharmon Rester; QB	Recruit ratings: No ratings found					
Jayden Slater; WR	Keller, TX	Boys Ranch High School	6 ft 5 in (1.96 m)	195 lb (88 kg)	–	
Jayden Slater; WR	Recruit ratings: No ratings found					
Michael Thomas; CB	Texarkana, TX	Texas High School	5 ft 11 in (1.80 m)	175 lb (79 kg)	–	
Michael Thomas; CB	Recruit ratings: No ratings found					
Blaise Tita; OLB	Houston, TX	Alief Taylor High School	6 ft 1 in (1.85 m)	210 lb (95 kg)	–	
Blaise Tita; OLB	Recruit ratings: No ratings found					
Darion White; OLB	Waco, TX	La Vega High School	6 ft 1 in (1.85 m)	202 lb (92 kg)	–	
Darion White; OLB	Recruit ratings: No ratings found					
Preston Yarber; OL	Canton, TX	Canton High School	6 ft 5 in (1.96 m)	270 lb (120 kg)	–	
Preston Yarber; OL	Recruit ratings: No ratings found					
Overall recruit ranking: 247Sports: #40 FCS, #179 FBS and FCS combined
Note: In many cases, Scout, Rivals, 247Sports, On3, and ESPN may conflict in their listings of height and weight.; In these cases, the average was taken. ESPN grades are on a 100-point scale.; Sources: "2020 Team Ranking". Rivals.com.

=== Incoming transfers ===
The Cardinals added four transfer players.

Name	Pos.	Height	Weight	Hometown	Year	Prev school
Alfonso Deleon	P	5’11	190	Shreveport, LA	Junior	Hutchinson CC
Khalan Griffin	RB	5’10	215	Tyler, TX	Sophomore	Rice
Jakolby Longino	QB	6’3	195	Missouri City, TX	Freshman	UTEP
Pius Njenge	DE	6’4	250	Stratford, TX	Sophomore	Southern Nazarene
