= 2022 Southeastern Louisiana Lions football team =

American college football season

2022 Southeastern Louisiana Lions football

Southland co-champion

NCAA Division I Second Round, L 42–48 ^{OT} at Samford
- Conference: Southland Conference

Ranking
- STATS: No. 12
- FCS Coaches: No. 19
- Record: 9–4 (5–1 Southland)
- Head coach: Frank Scelfo (5th season)
- Offensive coordinator: Greg Stevens (7th season)
- Defensive coordinator: Bill D'Ottavio (1st season)
- Home stadium: Strawberry Stadium

2022 Southland Conference football standings
	Conf.			Overall
Team	W		L	W		L
No. 12 Southeastern Louisiana +^	5	–	1	9	–	4
No. 3 Incarnate Word +^	5	–	1	12	–	2
Northwestern State	4	–	2	4	–	7
Nicholls	3	–	3	3	–	8
Texas A&M–Commerce *	3	–	3	5	–	6
McNeese	2	–	4	4	–	7
Houston Christian	1	–	5	2	–	9
Lamar	1	–	5	1	–	10
+ – Conference co-champions; ^ – FCS playoff participant; * – Texas A&M–Commerce ineligible for FCS postseason play due to transition from NCAA Division II; Rankings from STATS Poll

The 2022 Southeastern Louisiana Lions football team represented Southeastern Louisiana University as a member of the Southland Conference during the 2022 NCAA Division I FCS football season. They were led by head coach Frank Scelfo, who was coaching his fifth season with the program. The Lions played their home games at Strawberry Stadium in Hammond, Louisiana.

== Preseason ==
=== Preseason poll ===
The Southland Conference released their preseason poll on July 20, 2022. The Lions were picked to finish first in the conference.

=== Preseason All–Southland Teams ===
The Southland Conference announced the 2022 preseason all-conference football team selections on July 13, 2022. Southeastern Louisiana had a total of 10 players selected.

Offense

1st Team

- Gage Larvadain – Wide receiver, SO
- John Allen – Offensive lineman, JR
- Jalen Bell – Offensive lineman, SR

2nd Team

- Taron Jones – Running back, SR
- CJ Turner – Wide receiver, RS-SR
- Brennan Lanclos – Offensive lineman, RS-JR

Defense

1st Team

- Garrett Crawford – Defensive lineman, JR
- Zy Alexander – Defensive back, SO
- Donniel Ward-McGee – Defensive back, SR
- Gage Larvadain – Kick returner, SO

2nd Team

- Bryce Cage – Defensive lineman, SO
- Gage Larvadain – Punt returner, SO

== Personnel ==
2022 Southeastern Louisiana Lions football team roster
Players
Coaches
Offense

Pos.	#	Name	Class
WR	1	Gage Larvadain	So
WR	3	Anthony Spurlock	Jr
QB	5	Cephus Johnson III	Sr
WR	6	Nick Kovacs	Sr
WR	7	Terrell Carter	Sr
RB	9	Jessie Britt	Sr
WR	10	Maurice Massey	Fr
WR	15	Kody Finley	Fr
TE	15	Jacob Logan	GS
QB	17	Grant Tisdale	So
QB	19	Eli Sawyer	Fr
RB	21	Johnathan Vaughn	Fr
RB	21	Joseph Wilson	Fr
RB	22	Taron Jones	Sr
RB	24	Carlos Washington Jr.	Sr
RB	30	Boogie Childs	Fr
RB	31	Rodeo Graham Jr.	Fr
RB	33	Jahmon McClendon	So
TE	38	Ivan Drobocky	So
TE	44	Connor Briggs	Fr
OL	52	Noah Devlin	So
OL	54	Brockhim Wicks	So
OL	55	John Allen	Jr
OL	56	Javin Turner	Fr
OL	61	Holden Kareokowsky	Fr
OL	62	William Granville	So
OL	63	Dom Serapiglia III	So
OL	66	Alex Smith	Fr
OL	71	Gavin Burtchaell	Fr
OL	72	Brennan Lanclos	Jr
OL	73	Jhy Orgeron	So
OL	74	Jalen Bell	Sr
OL	75	Blakely Miller	Fr
OL	77	Alex Harris	Fr
OL	78	Logan Potter	Fr
WR	80	Da'shun Hughley	So
WR	81	Marcellus Johnson	Jr
WR	82	Corey Lorio	Fr
WR	84	Jett Booker	Fr
TE	85	Tanner Olsen	Jr
WR	86	Darius Lewis	So
WR	87	Jack Jackson	Fr
TE	88	Bauer Sharp	Fr
TE	89	Cade Collier	So

Defense

Pos.	#	Name	Class
DB	0	Jack Henderson	So
DB	2	Ferlando Jordan	Sr
DB	4	Brandon Barbee	Sr
DB	8	Donniel Ward-Magee	Sr
DB	11	Kunta Hester	So
LB	13	Herman Christophe	Jr
DB	13	Markell Linzer	Fr
DB	14	Zy Alexander	So
DB	16	Justin Dumas	So
DB	18	Coryell Pierce	So
DB	19	TaQuan Thomas	Fr
LB	20	Dominic Lamm	So
DB	23	Blayne Delahoussaye	So
DB	24	Varon Douglas	Fr
DB	25	Ian Goodly	Fr
LB	27	Donte' Daniels	So
DB	28	Tyrone Legette	Jr
DB	29	Robert Buquoi	So
LB	30	Anthony Britton Jr.	Jr
LB	32	KK Reno	Fr
DL	34	Arlen Williams	Jr
LB	38	Slade Ziegler	Jr
DL	39	Gerald Henderson	So
LB	41	Kevin Bickham	So
DB	42	Taylor Martin	Fr
DL	42	Shemar Pearl	Jr
DL	43	Tainano Gaulua	GS
LB	43	Heath Stephen	Jr
LB	44	Fred Hill	Jr
DL	45	Garrett Crawford	Jr
DL	46	Joshua Randall	So
DL	47	John Graves III	Jr
DB	49	Zack Vicknair	Fr
LB	50	Tommy Lee	So
LB	52	Blake Robinson	So
DL	53	Austin Kent	Jr
DL	58	Rodney Sopsher	Jr
DL	59	Beau Davis	So
DL	90	Bryce Cage	So
DL	91	Darrius Harry	So
DL	93	Rowan Briggs	Fr
DL	94	Kaleb Proctor	Fr
DL	96	Dalton Allen	Fr
DL	97	Tyrik Mitchell	So
DL	98	Cullan Scott	So
DL	99	Charles Hill	Jr

Special teams

Pos.	#	Name	Class
K, P	16	Riley Callaghan	Fr
P	26	Austin Dunlap	Jr
K	36	Mateo Rengifo	Jr
LS	39	Korey Karbowsky	So
K, P	50	Alec Mahler	Fr
LS	58	Garret Wilson	Fr

Head coach

- Frank Scelfo (Northeast Louisiana)

Coordinators/assistant coaches

- Greg Stevens (Eastern Oregon)
  Offensive coordinator/QB
- Bill D’Ottavio (Millersville)
  Defensive coordinator/safeties
- Ross Jenkins (Louisiana Tech)
  Special teams coordinator/TE
- A. J. Hopp (Slippery Rock)
  Run Game Coordinator/OL
- Anthony Scelfo (Tulane)
  Wide receivers/recruiting coordinator/Pass Game Coordinator
- Tom Rinaldi (Bridgeport)
  Defensive line
- Albert Poree (Georgia Tech)
  Running backs
- Dustin Landry (Auburn)
  Linebackers
- Del Lee-Collins (McNeese State)
  Cornerbacks
- Antonio Baker (Louisiana Tech)
  Nickelbacks

Legend

- (C) Team captain
- (S) Suspended
- (I) Ineligible
- Injured
- Redshirt

Roster

== Schedule ==
Southeastern Louisiana Lions finalized their 2022 schedule on February 11, 2022.

Date	Time	Opponent	Rank	Site	TV	Result	Attendance
September 3	6:00 p.m.	at Louisiana*	No. 17	Cajun Field; Lafayette, LA (Cypress Mug)	ESPN+	L 7–24	16,812
September 10	5:00 p.m.	at Florida Atlantic*	No. 21	FAU Stadium; Boca Raton, FL	ESPN3	L 9–42	17,532
September 17	6:00 p.m.	Central Connecticut*		Strawberry Stadium; Hammond, LA	ESPN+	W 70–6	5,277
September 24	6:00 p.m.	No. T–4 Incarnate Word		Strawberry Stadium; Hammond, LA	ESPN+	W 41–35	5,095
October 1	6:00 p.m.	Murray State*	No. 21	Strawberry Stadium; Hammond, LA	ESPN+	W 48–14	5,127
October 8	4:00 p.m.	Texas A&M–Commerce^{†}	No. 19	Strawberry Stadium; Hammond, LA	ESPN+	L 28–31	7,192
October 22	1:00 p.m.	at Jacksonville State*		Burgess–Snow Field at JSU Stadium; Jacksonville, AL	ESPN+	W 31–14	18,654
October 29	7:00 p.m.	at McNeese		Cowboy Stadium; Lake Charles, LA	ESPN+	W 28–27	8,068
November 5	3:00 p.m.	at Lamar		Provost Umphrey Stadium; Beaumont, TX	ESPN3	W 47–31	5,396
November 12	4:00 p.m.	Northwestern State	No. 25	Strawberry Stadium; Hammond, LA (rivlary)	ESPN3	W 23–7	5,019
November 17	6:00 p.m.	at Nicholls	No. 23	Manning Field at John L. Guidry Stadium; Thibodaux, LA (River Bell Classic)	ESPN+	W 40–17	7,911
November 26	6:00 p.m.	No. 18 Idaho*	No. 17	Strawberry Stadium; Hammond, LA (NCAA Division I First Round)	ESPN+	W 45–42	3,174
December 3	2:00 p.m.	at No. 8 Samford	No. 17	Seibert Stadium; Homewood, AL (NCAA Division I Second Round)	ESPN+	L 42–48 ^{OT}	4,587
*Non-conference game; ^{†}Homecoming; Rankings from STATS Poll released prior to the game; All times are in Central time

== Game summaries ==
=== At Louisiana ===
Southeastern Louisiana Lions at Louisiana Ragin' Cajuns

Quarter	1	2	3	4	Total
No. 17 Lions	0	0	7	0	7
(FBS) Ragin' Cajuns	10	7	0	7	24

at Cajun Field, Lafayette, LA

- Date: September 3
- Game time: 6:00 p.m. CDT
- Game weather: 75 °F (24 °C) • Weather: Cloudy • Wind: SW 4 MPH
- Game attendance: 16,812
- Referee: Scott Broadway
- TV announcers: Dan McDonald (play-by-play) and Eric Mouton (analyst)

Game information

First Quarter

- LA – 9:08 Johnny Lumpkin 28 yard pass from Chandler Fields, Preston Stafford kick
  LA 7–0 Drive: 9 plays, 79 yards, 4:20
- LA – 1:34 Preston Stafford 36 yard field goal
  LA 10–0 Drive: 14 plays, 58 yards, 5:54

Second Quarter

- LA – 12:41 Eric Garror 83 yard punt return, Preston Stafford kick
  LA 17–0 Drive: 0 plays, 0 yards, 0:00

Third Quarter

- SELA – 4:04 Carlos Washington, Jr. 5 yard rush, Mateo Rengifo kick
  LA 17–7 Drive: 13 plays, 78 yards, 5:56

Fourth Quarter

- LA – 1:37 Johnny Lumpkin 3 yard pass from Chandler Fields, Preston Stafford kick
  LA 24–7 Drive: 7 plays, 39 yards, 3:09

Statistics	Southeastern Louisiana	Louisiana
First downs	12	18
Total yards	260	374
Rushing yards	111	133
Passing yards	149	241
Turnovers	2	0
Time of possession	29:04	30:56

Team	Category	Player	Statistics
Southeastern Louisiana	Passing	Cephus Johnson	22/34, 149 yards, 1 INT
Southeastern Louisiana	Rushing	Carlos Washington Jr.	10 carries, 57 yards, 1 TD
Southeastern Louisiana	Receiving	CJ Turner	3 receptions, 46 yards
Louisiana	Passing	Chandler Fields	13/20, 173 yards, 2 TDs
Louisiana	Rushing	Terrence Williams	10 carries, 61 yards
Louisiana	Receiving	Johnny Lumpkin	5 receptions, 72 yards, 2 TDs

=== At Florida Atlantic ===
Southeastern Louisiana Lions at Florida Atlantic Owls

Quarter	1	2	3	4	Total
No. 21 Lions	0	3	0	6	9
(FBS) Owls	7	21	7	7	42

at FAU Stadium, Boca Raton, FL

- Date: September 10
- Game time: 5:00 p.m.
- Game weather: Sunny
- Game attendance: 17,533
- Referee: Joe Lehring
- TV: ESPN3

=== Vs. Central Connecticut ===
Central Connecticut Blue Devils at Southeastern Louisiana Lions

Quarter	1	2	3	4	Total
Blue Devils	0	0	6	0	6
Lions	14	34	10	12	70

at Strawberry Stadium, Hammond, LA

- Date: September 17
- Game time: 6:00 p.m.
- Game weather: Sunny
- Game attendance: 5,217
- Referee: Nolan Dumas
- TV: ESPN+

=== Vs. No. 4T Incarnate Word ===
Incarnate Word Cardinals at Southeastern Louisiana Lions

Quarter	1	2	3	4	Total
No. 4T Cardinals	7	14	7	7	35
Lions	7	14	3	17	41

at Strawberry Stadium, Hammond, LA

- Date: September 24
- Game time: 6:00 p.m.
- Game weather: Sunny
- Game attendance: 5,095
- Referee: Ed Bourgeois
- TV announcers (ESPN3): Chase Gispert (play-by-play), Lonn Ellzey (analyst) and Mackenzie Fletcher (sideline)
- Box Score

Game information

First Quarter

- SLU – 7:33 Ivan Drobocky 9 Yd pass from Cephus Johnson III, Riley Callaghan kick
  SLU 7–0 Drive: 5 plays, 33 yards, 2:37
- UIW – 0:17 Lindsey Scott Jr. 6 Yd Run, Carson Mohr kick
  Tied 7–7 Drive: 11 plays, 60 yards, 2:53

Second Quarter

- SLU – 11:17 Carlos Washington Jr. 2 Yd Run, Riley Callaghan kick
  SLU 14–7 Drive: 9 plays, 54 yards, 3:54
- UIW – 9:01 Marcus Cooper 4 Yd Run, Carson Mohr kick
  Tied 14–14 Drive: 6 plays, 82 yards, 2:11
- SLU – 6:53 Carlos Washington Jr. 5 Yd Run, Riley Callaghan kick
  SLU 21–14 Drive: 6 plays, 60 yards, 2:01
- UIW – 4:21 CJ Hardy 18 Yd pass from Lindsey Scott Jr., Carson Mohr kick
  Tied 21–21 Drive: 7 plays, 75 yards, 2:32

Third Quarter

- SLU – 8:49 Riley Callaghan 29 Yd Field Goal
  SLU 24–21 Drive: 12 plays, 64 yards, 6:11
- UIW – 2:45 Darion Chafin 5 Yd pass from Lindsey Scott Jr., Carson Mohr kick
  UIW 28–24 Drive: 13 plays, 79 yards, 5:56

Fourth Quarter

- SLU – 12:24 Riley Callaghan 23 Yd Field Goal
  UIW 28–27 Drive: 11 plays, 75 yards, 5:13
- SLU – 6:14 CJ Turner 15 Yd pass from Eli Sawyer, Jessie Britt pass from Eli Sawyer
  SLU 35–28 Drive: 7 plays, 46 yards, 3:17
- UIW – 0:21 Marquez Perez 4 Yd pass from Lindsey Scott Jr., Carson Mohr kick
  Tied 35–35 Drive: 9 plays, 55 yards, 3:04
- SLU – 0:00 CJ Turner 59 Yd pass from Eli Sawyer
  SLU 41–35 Drive: 3 plays, 81 yards, 0:16

Passing

- UIW – Lindsey Scott Jr. 27/38, 333 YDS, 3 TD, 1 INT
- SLU – Eli Sawyer 15/24, 256 YDS, 2 TD

Rushing

- UIW – Marcus Cooper 16 ATT, 61 YDS, 1 TD7
- SLU – Carlos Washington 23 CAR, 120 YDS, 2 TD

Receiving

- UIW – Marcus Cooper 6 REC, 94 YDS
- SLU – CJ Turner 5 REC, 139 YDS, 2 TD

=== Vs. Murray State ===
Murray State Racers at Southeastern Louisiana Lions

Quarter	1	2	3	4	Total
Racers	0	7	7	0	14
No. 21 Lions	7	10	3	28	48

at Strawberry Stadium, Hammond, LA

- Date: October 1
- Game time: 6:00 p.m.
- Game weather: Clear
- Game attendance: 5,127
- Referee: Nolan Dumas
- TV: ESPN3

=== Vs. Texas A&M-Commerce ===
Texas A&M-Commerce Lions at Southeastern Louisiana Lions

Quarter	1	2	3	4	Total
TAMU-Commerce Lions	7	3	14	7	31
SELU No. 19 Lions	0	14	7	7	28

at Strawberry Stadium, Hammond, LA

- Date: October 8
- Game time: 4:00 p.m.
- Game weather: Clear
- Game attendance: 7,192
- Referee: Gary Leeper
- TV: ESPN+

=== At Jacksonville State ===
Southeastern Louisiana Lions at Jacksonville State Gamecocks

Quarter	1	2	3	4	Total
Lions	0	13	0	18	31
Gamecocks	0	14	0	0	14

at Burgess-Snow Field at JSU Stadium, Jacksonville, AL

- Date: October 22
- Game time: 1:00 p.m.
- Game weather: Sunny
- Game attendance: 18,654
- Referee: Garrett Dickerson
- TV: ESPN+

=== At McNeese ===
Southeastern Louisiana Lions at McNeese Cowboys

Quarter	1	2	3	4	Total
Lions	7	7	7	7	28
Cowboys	6	14	7	0	27

at Cowboy Stadium, Lake Charles, LA

- Date: October 29
- Game time: 7:00 p.m.
- Game weather: Cloudy
- Game attendance: 8,068
- Referee: Gary Leeper
- TV: ESPN+

=== At Lamar ===
Southeastern Louisiana Lions at Lamar Cardinals

Quarter	1	2	3	4	Total
Lions	14	10	10	13	47
Cowboys	0	17	7	7	31

at Provost Umphrey Stadium, Beaumont, TX

- Date: November 5
- Game time: 3:00 p.m.
- Game weather: Sunny
- Game attendance: 5,396
- Referee: Nolan Duman
- TV: ESPN3

Statistics

Statistics	Southeastern Louisiana	Lamar
First downs	28	16
Total yards	527	415
Rushing yards	204	164
Passing yards	323	251
Turnovers	2	1
Time of possession	28:52	31:08

Team	Category	Player	Statistics
Southeastern Louisiana	Passing	Cephus Johnson, III	19-27; 179 yards; long 38 yards
Southeastern Louisiana	Rushing	Carlos Washington, Jr.	18 attempts; 68 yards total; long 15 yards
Southeastern Louisiana	Receiving	Maurice Massey	10 receptions; 158 yards total; long 38 yards
Lamar	Passing	Michael Chandler	16-34; 251 yards; long 62 yards
Lamar	Rushing	Khalan Griffin	11 attempts; 84 yards total; long 40 yards
Lamar	Receiving	Andre Dennis	4 receptions; 108 yards total; long 62 yards

=== Vs. Northwestern State ===
Northwestern State Demons at Southeastern Louisiana Lions

Quarter	1	2	3	4	Total
Demons	0	0	7	0	7
Lions	7	16	0	0	23

at Strawberry Stadium, Hammond, LA

- Date: November 12
- Game time: 4:00 p.m.
- Game weather: Cloudy
- Game attendance: 5,019
- Referee: Craig Heiser
- TV: ESPN3

=== At Nicholls ===
Southeastern Louisiana Lions at Nicholls Colonels

Quarter	1	2	3	4	Total
No. 23 Lions	10	20	7	3	40
Colonels	7	10	0	0	17

at Manning Field at John L. Guidry Stadium, Thibodaux, LA

- Date: November 17
- Game time: 6:00 p.m.
- Game weather: Sunny
- Game attendance: 7,911
- Referee: Ed Bourgeois
- TV: ESPN+

== FCS Playoffs ==
=== Vs. No. 18 Idaho - First Round ===
Idaho Vandals at Southeastern Louisiana Lions

Quarter	1	2	3	4	Total
No. 18 Vandals	7	14	0	21	42
No. 17 Lions	7	10	7	21	45

at Strawberry Stadium, Hammond, LA

- Date: November 26
- Game time: 6:00 p.m.
- Game weather: Cloudy
- Game attendance: 3,174
- Referee: Rick Wayne
- TV: ESPN+

=== At No. 8 Samford - Second Round ===
Southeastern Louisiana Lions at Samford Bulldogs

Quarter	1	2	3	4	OT	Total
No. 17 Lions	14	0	14	14	0	42
No. 8 Bulldogs	14	7	7	14	6	48

at Seibert Stadium, Homewood, AL

- Date: December 3
- Game time: 2:00 p.m.
- Game weather: Cloudy
- Game attendance: 4,587
- Referee: Jeremy DeAngulo
- TV: ESPN+
