= 2022 Houston Christian Huskies football team =

American college football season

2022 Houston Christian Huskies football
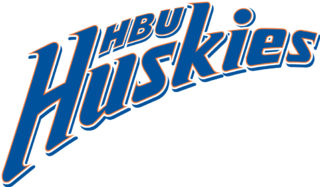
- Conference: Southland Conference
- Record: 2–9 (1–5 Southland)
- Head coach: Vic Shealy (10th season)
- Offensive coordinator: Cedric Cormier (2nd season)
- Offensive scheme: Air raid
- Defensive coordinator: Shane Eachus (2nd season)
- Co-defensive coordinator: Roger Hinshaw (10th season)
- Base defense: Multiple
- Home stadium: Husky Stadium

2022 Southland Conference football standings
	Conf.			Overall
Team	W		L	W		L
No. 12 Southeastern Louisiana +^	5	–	1	9	–	4
No. 3 Incarnate Word +^	5	–	1	12	–	2
Northwestern State	4	–	2	4	–	7
Nicholls	3	–	3	3	–	8
Texas A&M–Commerce *	3	–	3	5	–	6
McNeese	2	–	4	4	–	7
Houston Christian	1	–	5	2	–	9
Lamar	1	–	5	1	–	10
+ – Conference co-champions; ^ – FCS playoff participant; * – Texas A&M–Commerce ineligible for FCS postseason play due to transition from NCAA Division II; Rankings from STATS Poll

The 2022 Houston Christian Huskies football team represented Houston Christian University as a member of the Southland Conference during the 2022 NCAA Division I FCS football season. Led by tenth-year head coach Vic Shealy the Huskies compiled an overall record of 2–9. The Huskies tied for seventh place with Lamar in conference play with a 1–5 conference record. The Huskies played home games at Husky Stadium in Houston.

== Preseason ==
=== Preseason poll ===
The Southland Conference released their preseason poll on July 20, 2022. The Huskies were picked to finish last in the conference.

== Schedule ==
Houston Christian finalized their 2022 schedule on February 16, 2022.

Date	Time	Opponent	Site	TV	Result	Attendance
September 3	3:00 p.m.	at Northern Colorado*	Nottingham Field; Greeley, CO	ESPN+	W 46–34	4,419
September 10	6:00 p.m.	Lindenwood*	Husky Stadium; Houston, TX	ESPN3	L 20–21	2,125
September 24	6:00 p.m.	at Texas State*	Bobcat Stadium; San Marcos, TX	ESPN3	L 0–34	16,237
October 1	3:00 p.m.	at Lamar	Provost Umphrey Stadium; Beaumont, TX	ESPN+	W 37–34	5,473
October 8	6:00 p.m.	Nicholls	Husky Stadium; Houston, TX	ESPN+	L 17–19	1,823
October 15	6:00 p.m.	Northwestern State^{†}	Husky Stadium; Houston, TX	ESPN+	L 15–40	1,963
October 22	2:00 p.m.	at Texas A&M–Commerce	Memorial Stadium; Commerce, TX	ESPN+	L 3–31	5,557
October 29	2:00 p.m.	No. 21 UT Martin*	Husky Stadium; Houston, TX	ESPN+	L 28–52	1,137
November 5	2:00 p.m.	at No. 7 Incarnate Word	Gayle and Tom Benson Stadium; San Antonio, TX	ESPN+	L 20–73	3,249
November 12	2:00 p.m.	McNeese State	Husky Stadium; Houston, TX	ESPN+	L 10–21	1,355
November 19	2:00 p.m.	at Tarleton State*	Memorial Stadium; Stephenville, TX	ESPN+	L 7–49	8,121
*Non-conference game; ^{†}Homecoming; Rankings from STATS Poll released prior to the game; All times are in Central time

== Game summaries ==
=== At Northern Colorado ===
	1	2	3	4	Total
Huskies	6	16	10	14	46
Bears	7	7	0	20	34

=== Lindenwood ===
	1	2	3	4	Total
Lions	6	0	6	9	21
Huskies	7	10	3	0	20

=== At Texas State ===
	1	2	3	4	Total
Huskies	0	0	0	0	0
Bobcats	7	17	3	7	34

Statistics	HCU	TXST
First downs	8	28
Total yards	142	479
Rushing yards	39	117
Passing yards	103	362
Turnovers	1	1
Time of possession	24:55	35:05

Team	Category	Player	Statistics
Houston Christian	Passing	Justin Fomby	23/36, 103 yards, INT
Houston Christian	Rushing	R. J. Smith	9 rushes, 24 yards
Houston Christian	Receiving	Vernon Harrell	2 receptions, 26 yards
Texas State	Passing	Layne Hatcher	27/41, 362 yards, 4 TD, INT
Texas State	Rushing	Lincoln Pare	19 rushes, 84 yards
Texas State	Receiving	Marcell Barbee	6 receptions, 112 yards, TD

=== At Lamar ===
	1	2	3	4	Total
Huskies	0	24	13	0	37
Cardinals	0	7	7	20	34

Statistics

Statistics	Houston Christian	Lamar
First downs	17	18
Total yards	323	376
Rushing yards	66	119
Passing yards	257	257
Turnovers	0	2
Time of possession	29:05	30:55

Team	Category	Player	Statistics
Houston Christian	Passing	Justin Fomby	31/45; 249 yards total; 40 long
Houston Christian	Rushing	Nate Livingston	6 attempts; 33 yards total; 11 long
Houston Christian	Receiving	Karl Reynolds	9 receptions; 109 yards total; 40 long
Lamar	Passing	Mike Chandler	11/27; 239 total yards; 52 yards long
Lamar	Rushing	Mike Chandler	13 attempts; 59 yards total; 13 long
Lamar	Receiving	Kyndon Fuselier	3 receptions; 104 yards total; 44 long

=== Nicholls ===
	1	2	3	4	Total
Colonels	3	3	7	6	19
Huskies	0	0	14	3	17

=== Northwestern State ===
	1	2	3	4	Total
Demons	24	0	0	13	37
Huskies	0	0	10	0	10

=== At Texas A&M-Commerce ===
	1	2	3	4	Total
Huskies	3	0	0	0	3
Lions	0	7	17	7	31

=== No. 21 UT Martin ===
	1	2	3	4	Total
No. 21 Skyhawks	10	14	21	7	52
Huskies	7	7	7	7	28

=== At No. 7 Incarnate Word ===
Houston Christian Huskies at Incarnate Word Cardinals

Quarter	1	2	3	4	Total
Huskies	3	3	14	0	20
No. 7 Cardinals	21	49	3	0	73

at Gayle and Tom Benson Stadium, San Antonio, TX

- Date: November 5
- Game time: 2:05 p.m.
- Game weather: Temperature: 75 • Wind: SSE 6 mph • Weather: Sunny and Clear
- Game attendance: 3,249
- Referee: James Brookhart
- TV announcers (ESPN+): Paul Alexander (play-by-play), Karl Schoening (analyst) and Katie Goodman (sideline)
- Box Score

Game information

First Quarter

- HCU – 11:29 Nery Enriquez 32 yard field goal
  HCU 3–0 Drive: 11 plays, 56 yards, 3:26
- UIW – 7:50 Brandon Porter 19 yard pass from Lindsey Scott Jr., Carson Mohr kick
  UIW 7–3 Drive 5 plays, 38 yards, 1:22
- UIW – 7:34 Kelechi Anyalebechi 22 yard interception return, Carson Mohr kick
  UIW 14–3
- UIW – 2:35 Brandon Porter 41 yard pass from Lindsey Scott, Jr., Carson Mohr kick
  UIW 21–3 Drive: 4 plays, 81 yards, 0:57

Second Quarter

- HCU – 14:22 Nery Enriquez 31 yard field goal
  UIW 21–6 Drive: 10 plays, 61 yards, 3:13
- UIW – 12:38 Marcus Cooper fumble recovery in the end zone, Carson Mohr kick
  UIW 28–6 Drive: 5 plays, 67 yards, 1:38
- UIW – 11:58 Darion Chafin 10 yard pass from Lindsey Scott, Jr., Carson Mohr kick
  UIW 35–6 Drive: 3 plays, 10 yards, 0:15
- UIW – 9:28 CJ Hardy 13 yard pass from Lindsey Scott, Jr., Carson Mohr kick
  UIW 42–6 Drive: 3 plays, 58 yards, 0:37
- UIW – 8:13 Chance Trentman-Rosas 3 yard blocked punt return, Carson Mohr kick
  UIW 49–6
- UIW – 6:10 Darion Chafin 34 yard pass from Lindsey Scott, Jr., Carson Mohr kick
  UIW 56–6 Drive: 5 plays, 45 yards, 1:34
- UIW – 5:46 Taylor Grimes 39 yard pass from Lindsey Scott, Jr., Carson Mohr kick
  UIW 56–6 Drive: 1 play, 39 yard, 0:07
- UIW – 1:59 Jaelin Campbell 63 yard pass from Lindsey Scott, Jr., Carson Mohr kick
  UIW 70–6 Drive 5 plays, 78 yards, 1:50

Third Quarter

- UIW - 11:14 Carson Mohr 35 yard field goal
  UIW 73–6 Drive 7 plays, 39 yards, 3:41
- HCU – 7:03 Nat Livingston 7 yard fun, Nery Enriquez kick
  UIW 73–13 Drive 11 plays, 77 yards, 4:04
- HCU – 2:38 Fudge Woods 28 yard pass from Justin Fomby, Nery Enriquez kick
  UIW 73–20 Drive: 5 plays, 50 yards, 2:25

Passing

- HCU – Justin Fomby 27/45, 267 YDS, 1 TD, 3 INT
- UIW – Lindsey Scott Jr. 15/20, 319 YDS, 7 TD

Rushing

- HCU – Ismail Mahdi 13 ATT, 87 YDS
- UIW – Marcus Cooper 13 YDS, 79 YDS

Receiving

- HCU – Deon Cormier 8 REC, 65 YDS
- UIW – Jaelin Campbell 3 REC, 78 YDS, 1 TD

=== McNeese State ===
	1	2	3	4	Total
Cowboys	0	7	7	7	21
Huskies	0	7	3	0	10

=== At Tarleton State ===
	1	2	3	4	Total
Huskies	0	7	0	0	7
Texans	28	7	14	0	49
