= 2022 Texas A&M–Commerce Lions football team =

American college football season

2022 Texas A&M–Commerce Lions football
- Conference: Southland Conference
- Record: 5–6 (3–3 Southland)
- Head coach: David Bailiff (4th season)
- Offensive coordinator: Billy Riebock (4th season)
- Offensive scheme: Spread
- Defensive coordinator: Kyle Williams (1st season)
- Base defense: 4–2–5
- Home stadium: Ernest Hawkins Field at Memorial Stadium

2022 Southland Conference football standings
	Conf.			Overall
Team	W		L	W		L
No. 12 Southeastern Louisiana +^	5	–	1	9	–	4
No. 3 Incarnate Word +^	5	–	1	12	–	2
Northwestern State	4	–	2	4	–	7
Nicholls	3	–	3	3	–	8
Texas A&M–Commerce *	3	–	3	5	–	6
McNeese	2	–	4	4	–	7
Houston Christian	1	–	5	2	–	9
Lamar	1	–	5	1	–	10
+ – Conference co-champions; ^ – FCS playoff participant; * – Texas A&M–Commerce ineligible for FCS postseason play due to transition from NCAA Division II; Rankings from STATS Poll

The 2022 Texas A&M–Commerce Lions football team represented Texas A&M University–Commerce as a member of the Southland Conference during the 2022 NCAA Division I FCS football season. They were led by head coach David Bailiff, who coached his third and final season with the program. The Lions played their home games at Memorial Stadium in Commerce, Texas.

This was the program's inaugural season in the Southland Conference.

== Preseason ==
=== Preseason poll ===
The Southland Conference released their preseason poll on July 20, 2022. The Lions were picked to finish sixth in the conference.

== Personnel ==
2022 Texas A&M–Commerce Lions football team roster
Players
Coaches
Offense

Pos.	#	Name	Class
WR	1	Andrew Armstrong	So
WR	2	Kenedy Snell	Sr
WR	4	Jaden Proctor	So
WR	6	J.T. Smith	Sr
QB	8	Tyson Oliver	Fr
WR	9	Ke’Andre Street	Jr
QB	11	Eric Rodriguez	So
WR	12	Cameron Nellor	So
RB	16	DeMareus Hosey	So
QB	18	Zadock Dinkelmann	Jr
RB	22	B.J. Phillips, Jr.	Fr
WR	23	BJ Busbee	Sr
RB	24	Reggie Branch	Fr
RB	29	Spencer Long	Jr
TE	44	Austin Samaha	Fr
OL	52	Zach Gilmore	So
OL	54	Jaden Edmonson	Fr
OL	55	Jo-Bentley Keilani	Sr
OL	56	Chandler Donaway	Fr
OL	58	James Clark III	So
OL	63	Solomon Ndukwe	Sr
OL	66	McKenzie Agnello	Fr
OL	70	Mitchell Gorgas	Fr
OL	73	Nonso Omezi	Fr
OL	74	Ian Langford	Fr
OL	75	Jadin Jones	So
OL	77	Rehoboth Chibesa	Sr
OL	78	Hunter Miller	So
TE	80	Michael Keating	Sr
RB	81	Darlington Frasch	Fr
WR	82	Damirion Polty	Fr
WR	85	Isaac Sanchez	Fr
WR	86	Landry Tyson	So
TE	87	Dawson Hearne	Fr
WR	88	Keith Miller	Fr
TE		Casey Curtin	Fr
WR		Brendan Easley	Jr
OL		Peyton Ellis	Fr
TE		Orvis Fowler	So
WR		Treveon Johnson	Sr
QB		Thomas Landry	Fr
WR		Kevin LeDee	Jr
QB		Jaiave Magalei	Sr
TE		Blake Nelson	Fr
OL		Kaderrius Nelson	Fr
RB		EJ Oakmon	Fr

Defense

Pos.	#	Name	Class
LB	0	Dee Walker	Sr
LB	3	Prince Lollar	Sr
DB	5	D’Ante Smith	Sr
DB	7	Darius Williams	Sr
DB	10	Jordan Polk	So
DB	13	Champ Mathis	So
DB	14	Max Epps	So
DL	15	Justice Williams	Sr
DB	17	Jaden Rios	Fr
DB	21	Kendall Paul	So
DB	25	Daryion Taylor	Jr
DB	26	King Ambers	Jr
LB	27	Kion Hurd	Fr
DB	28	Sean-Krystoff King	Fr
DB	30	Mekhi Roberson	So
DB	31	Christian Shaw	Fr
LB	33	Xavier Morris	Sr
DB	34	George Gipson, Jr.	So
LB	35	Jaheim Lowe	Fr
DB	36	Lavon Williams	Fr
DB	37	Javotrick Dotrey	Jr
LB	38	Brandon Tucker, Jr.	Fr
DL	40	Michael Surface	Fr
DB	41	Jewelz-Unique Demps	Fr
DL	42	Juan Henry	Jr
DB	43	Davotrick Dotrey	Jr
DL	45	Celestin Haba	Sr
LB	50	Michael Noble	Sr
DL	51	Dorian Gates	Fr
DL	53	Levi Drake Rodriguez	Jr
DL	90	Bryson Stewart	So
DL	91	Clifford Funderburk	So
DL	92	Micah Owens	Fr
DL	93	Warren Robinson	So
DL	94	Torami Dixon, Jr.	Fr
DL	95	Patrick Brown, Jr.	Fr
DL	96	Anthony Gray	Fr
DL	97	Ben Hutch	Sr
DL	99	Leon Young	So
DB		Kyree Anderson	Fr
DL		Kiran Curtis	Fr
DL		Xayvion Fuller	Fr
DL		Gerard Joseph	Fr
LB		Daimon LaFrance	Jr
DB		Chase Moffitt	Fr
DB		Christopher Roberts, Jr.	Fr
DL		Aiden Wallace	Fr
LB		Luke Williams	Fr

Special teams

Pos.	#	Name	Class
K/P	39	Emmanuel Adagbon	Jr
LS	46	Carter Waid	Fr
LS	47	Josiah Kennard	Fr
P	48	Mitchell McGarry	So
K	49	Aidan Martin	Fr
LS		Evin McLeland	Fr
K		Jonathan Spurlock	Fr

Head coach

- David Bailiff (Southwest Texas State)

Coordinators/assistant coaches

- Billy Riebock (Quincy)
  Offensive coordinator/qb
- Kyle Williams (Kansas)
  Defensive coordinator/cb
- Jack Welch (Taylor)
  Special teams coordinator/rb
- Joe Caldwell (Auburn)
  Senior director of sports performance
- Ronnie Vinklarek (Southwest Texas State)
  Offensive line
- Tyron Carrier (Houston)
  Wide receivers
- Curtis Fuller (TCU)
  Safeties
- Michael Smith (Rice)
  Defensive line
- Jack Tyler (Virginia Tech)
  Linebackers
- Scott Vestal (Texas A&M)
  Tight ends/recruiting coordinator

Legend

- (C) Team captain
- (S) Suspended
- (I) Ineligible
- Injured
- Redshirt

Roster

== Schedule ==
Texas A&M–Commerce finalized their 2022 schedule on January 20, 2022.

Date	Time	Opponent	Site	TV	Result	Attendance
September 1	7:00 p.m.	Lincoln (CA)*	Ernest Hawkins Field at Memorial Stadium; Commerce, TX	ESPN+	W 52–7	2,130
September 10	6:00 p.m.	at Tennessee Tech*	Tucker Stadium; Cookeville, TN	ESPN+	L 25–26	7,352
September 17	6:00 p.m.	at Sam Houston*	Bowers Stadium; Huntsville, TX	ESPN+	L 17–27	8,675
September 24	6:00 p.m.	North American*	Ernest Hawkins Field at Memorial Stadium; Commerce, TX	ESPN+	W 63–3	3,742
October 8	4:00 p.m.	at No. 19 Southeastern Louisiana	Strawberry Stadium; Hammond, LA	ESPN+	W 31–28	7,192
October 15	2:00 p.m.	at McNeese State	Cowboy Stadium; Lake Charles, LA	ESPN+	W 40–15	9,202
October 22	2:00 p.m.	Houston Christian^{†}	Ernest Hawkins Field at Memorial Stadium; Commerce, TX	ESPN+	W 31–3	5,557
October 29	2:00 p.m.	No. 8 Incarnate Word	Ernest Hawkins Field at Memorial Stadium; Commerce, TX	ESPN+	L 7–35	4,127
November 5	2:00 p.m.	Northwestern State	Ernest Hawkins Field at Memorial Stadium; Commerce, TX	ESPN+	L 14–41	3,814
November 12	2:00 p.m.	at Nicholls	Manning Field at John L. Guidry Stadium; Thibodaux, LA	ESPN+	L 10–12	5,021
November 19	2:00 p.m.	Tennessee State*	Ernest Hawkins Field at Memorial Stadium; Commerce, TX	ESPN+	L 14–22	4,029
*Non-conference game; ^{†}Homecoming; Rankings from STATS Poll released prior to the game; All times are in Central time

== Game summaries ==
=== Lincoln ===
	1	2	3	4	Total
Oaklanders	0	0	7	0	7
Lions	14	21	7	10	52

=== At Tennessee Tech ===
	1	2	3	4	Total
Commerce Lions	0	16	3	6	25
Golden Eagles	0	3	3	20	26

=== At Sam Houston ===
Texas A&M–Commerce Lions (1–1) vs Sam Houston Bearkats (0–2) – Game summary

Quarter	1	2	3	4	Total
Lions	0	0	7	10	17
Bearkats	3	7	7	10	27

at Bowers Stadium • Huntsville, Texas

- Date: September 17
- Game time: 6:00 p.m. CDT
- Game weather: Party cloudy • Temperature: 86 °F (30 °C) • Wind: S at 6 miles per hour (9.7 km/h)
- Game attendance: 8,675
- Referee: Marcus Thornton
- TV announcers (ESPN+): Randy McIlvoy (play-by-play) and Shea Walker (analyst)
- Box score, Recap

Game information

First quarter

- (2:53) SHSU – Seth Morgan 40-yard field goal (Drive: 8 plays, 32 yards, 2:42; Sam Houston 3–0)

Second quarter

- (12:10) SHSU – Jordan Yates 6-yard run, Seth Morgan kick (Drive: 8 plays, 44 yards, 3:21; Sam Houston 10–0)

Third quarter

- (10:59) TAMC – Celestin Haba 41-yard interception return, Emmanuel Adagbon kick (Sam Houston 10–7)
- (6:39) SHSU – Cody Chrest 3-yard pass from Keegan Shoemaker, Seth Morgan kick (Drive: 13 plays, 75 yards, 4:20; Sam Houston 17–7)

Fourth quarter

- (11:33) TAMC – Emmanuel Adagbon 22-yard field goal (Drive: 9 plays, 50 yards, 3:50; Sam Houston 17–10)
- (9:31) SHSU – Zach Hrbacek 7-yard run, Seth Morgan kick (Drive: 5 plays, 47 yards, 1:53; Sam Houston 24–10)
- (4:46) SHSU – Seth Morgan 46-yard field goal (Drive: 7 plays, 28 yards, 3:31; Sam Houston 27–10)
- (0:31) TAMC – Spencer Long 1-yard run, Emmanuel Adagbon kick (Drive: 12 plays, 75 yards, 4:15; Sam Houston 27–17)

Statistics	TAMC	SHSU
First downs	14	27
Plays–yards	57–223	74–347
Rushes–yards	32–54	47–246
Passing yards	169	101
Passing: comp–att–int	13–25–1	11–27–1
Time of possession	28:03	31:57

Team	Category	Player	Statistics
Texas A&M–Commerce	Passing	Zadock Dinkelmann	13/25, 169 yards, 1 INT
Texas A&M–Commerce	Rushing	Zadock Dinkelmann	15 carries, 20 yards
Texas A&M–Commerce	Receiving	Andrew Armstrong	7 receptions, 104 yards
Sam Houston	Passing	Jordan Yates	5/14, 63 yards, 1 INT
Sam Houston	Rushing	Zach Hrbacek	19 carries, 131 yards, 1 TD
Sam Houston	Receiving	Cody Chrest	4 receptions, 55 yards, 1 TD

=== North American ===
	1	2	3	4	Total
Stallions	3	0	0	0	3
Lions	21	21	14	7	63

=== At No. 19 Southeastern Louisiana ===
Texas A&M-Commerce Lions at Southeastern Louisiana Lions

Quarter	1	2	3	4	Total
TAMU-Commerce Lions	7	3	14	7	31
SELU No. 19 Lions	0	14	7	7	28

at Strawberry Stadium, Hammond, LA

- Date: October 8
- Game time: 4:00 p.m.
- Game weather: Clear
- Game attendance: 7,192
- Referee: Gary Leeper
- TV: ESPN+

=== At McNeese State ===
	1	2	3	4	Total
Lions	7	10	3	20	40
Cowboys	8	7	0	0	15

=== Houston Christian ===
	1	2	3	4	Total
Huskies	3	0	0	0	3
Lions	0	7	17	7	31

=== No. 8 Incarnate Word ===
Incarnate Word Cardinals at Texas A&M–Commerce Lions

Quarter	1	2	3	4	Total
No. 8 Cardinals	0	14	7	14	35
Lions	0	7	0	0	7

at Ernest Hawkins Field at Memorial Stadium, Commerce, TX

- Date: October 29
- Game time: 2:02 p.m.
- Game weather: Temperature: 64 • Wind: NW 12 mph • Weather: Cloudy
- Game attendance: 4,127
- Referee: Nolan Dumas
- TV announcers (ESPN+): John Hendrie (play-by-play) and Drew Ivory (analyst)
- Box Score

Game information

First Quarter

None

Second Quarter

- UIW – 9:30 Lindsey Scott Jr. 24 yard run, Carson Mohr kick
  UIW 7–0 Drive: 8 plays, 99 yards, 3:03
- TAMUC – 4:09 Cameron Nellor 4 yard run, Emmanuel Adagbon kick
  Tied 7–7 Drive: 10 plays, 65 yards, 5:21
- UIW – 1:10 Marcus Cooper 5 yard run, Carson Mohr kick
  UIW 14–7 Drive: 10 plays, 77 yards, 2:54

Third Quarter

- UIW – 12:57 Brandon Porter 34 yard pass from Lindsey Scott, Jr., Carson Mohr kick
  UIW 21–7 Drive: 7 plays, 72 yards, 1:59

Fourth Quarter

- UIW – 14:30 Marcus Cooper 4 yard run, Carson Mohr kick
  UIW 28–7 Drive: 8 plays, 78 yards, 3:00
- UIW – 2:36 Marcus Cooper 3 yard run, Carson Mohr kick
  UIW 35–7 Drive: 11 plays, 52 yards, 5:52

Passing

- UIW – Lindsey Scott Jr. 19/29, 282 YDS, 1 TD, 2 INT
- TAMUC – Eric Rodriguez 16/27, 162 YDS, 2 INT

Rushing

- UIW – Marcus Cooper 22 ATT, 183 YDS, 3 TD
- TAMUC – Spencer Long 14 ATT, 38 YDS

Receiving

- UIW – Brandon Porter 7 REC, 127 YDS, 1 TD
- TAMUC – Andrew Armstrong 6 REC, 42 YDS

=== Northwestern State ===
	1	2	3	4	Total
Demons	14	7	13	7	41
Lions	0	14	0	0	14

=== At Nicholls ===
	1	2	3	4	Total
Lions	10	0	0	0	10
Colonels	0	3	7	2	12

=== Tennessee State ===
	1	2	3	4	Total
Tigers	7	12	3	0	22
Lions	7	0	7	0	14
