= 2022 McNeese Cowboys football team =

American college football season

2022 McNeese Cowboys football
- Conference: Southland Conference
- Record: 4–7 (2–4 Southland)
- Head coach: Gary Goff (1st season)
- Offensive scheme: Air raid
- Defensive coordinator: Tony Pecoraro (1st season)
- Home stadium: Cowboy Stadium

2022 Southland Conference football standings
	Conf.			Overall
Team	W		L	W		L
No. 12 Southeastern Louisiana +^	5	–	1	9	–	4
No. 3 Incarnate Word +^	5	–	1	12	–	2
Northwestern State	4	–	2	4	–	7
Nicholls	3	–	3	3	–	8
Texas A&M–Commerce *	3	–	3	5	–	6
McNeese	2	–	4	4	–	7
Houston Christian	1	–	5	2	–	9
Lamar	1	–	5	1	–	10
+ – Conference co-champions; ^ – FCS playoff participant; * – Texas A&M–Commerce ineligible for FCS postseason play due to transition from NCAA Division II; Rankings from STATS Poll

The 2022 McNeese State Cowboys football team represented McNeese State University as a member of the Southland Conference during the 2022 NCAA Division I FCS football season. Led by first-year head coach Gary Goff, the Cowboys compiled an overall record of 4–7 with a mark of 2–4 in conference play, placing sixth in the Southland. McNeese State played home games at Cowboy Stadium in Lake Charles, Louisiana.

== Preseason ==
=== Preseason poll ===
The Southland Conference released its preseason poll on July 20, 2022. The Cowboys were picked to finish fourth in the conference.

== Schedule ==
Date	Time	Opponent	Site	TV	Result	Attendance
September 3	7:00 p.m.	at No. 4 Montana State*	Bobcat Stadium; Bozeman, MT	ESPN+	L 17–40	21,687
September 10	6:30 p.m.	at Rice*	Rice Stadium; Houston, TX	ESPN3	L 10–52	18,629
September 17	7:00 p.m.	Alcorn State*	Cowboy Stadium; Lake Charles, LA	ESPN3	L 19–30	11,425
September 24	7:00 p.m.	Mississippi College*	Cowboy Stadium; Lake Charles, LA	ESPN+	W 32–17	10,105
October 1	6:00 p.m.	at No. 11 Incarnate Word	Gayle and Tom Benson Stadium; San Antonio, TX	ESPN+	L 20–48	2,542
October 15	7:00 p.m.	Texas A&M–Commerce	Cowboy Stadium; Lake Charles, LA	ESPN+	L 15–40	9,202
October 22	3:00 p.m.	at Nicholls	Manning Field at John L. Guidry Stadium; Thibodaux, LA	ESPN+	L 35–40	5,788
October 29	7:00 p.m.	Southeastern Louisiana^{†}	Cowboy Stadium; Lake Charles, LA	ESPN+	L 27–28	8,068
November 5	7:00 p.m.	Eastern Illinois*	Cowboy Stadium; Lake Charles, LA	ESPN+	W 29–15	7,520
November 12	2:00 p.m.	at Houston Christian	Husky Stadium; Houston, TX	ESPN+	W 21–10	1,355
November 19	7:00 p.m.	Lamar	Cowboy Stadium; Lake Charles, LA (Battle of the Border)	ESPN+	W 24–20	6,901
*Non-conference game; ^{†}Homecoming; Rankings from STATS Poll released prior to the game; All times are in Central time

== Game summaries ==
=== At No. 4 Montana State ===
	1	2	3	4	Total
Cowboys	0	10	0	7	17
No. 4 Bobcats	0	17	16	7	40

=== At Rice ===
McNeese State Cowboys (0–1) vs. Rice Owls (0–1)

Quarter	1	2	3	4	Total
Cowboys	0	0	10	0	10
Owls	10	21	14	7	52

at Rice Stadium • Houston, TX

- Date: September 10th
- Game time: 6:30 P.M CST
- Game attendance: 18,629
- Referee: Ed Ardito
- TV: ESPN3

Statistics	McNeese State	Rice
First downs	14	26
Plays–yards	51–263	74–487
Rushes–yards	30–172	43–209
Passing yards	91	278
Passing: comp–att–int	8–21–2	21–31–0
Time of possession	21:48	38:12

Team	Category	Player	Statistics
McNeese State	Passing	Know Kadum	5/12, 65 yards, 1 INT
McNeese State	Rushing	Deonta McMahon	5 carries, 101 yards, 1 TD
McNeese State	Receiving	Mason Pierce	3 receptions, 37 yards
Rice	Passing	TJ McMahon	20/29, 274 yards, 4 TD
Rice	Rushing	Ari Broussard	17 carries, 71 yards, 1 TD
Rice	Receiving	Bradley Rozner	3 receptions, 101 yards, 2 TD

Scoring summary

Quarter	Time	Drive			Team	Scoring information	Score	
Quarter	Time	Plays	Yards	TOP	Team	Scoring information	McNeese State	Rice
1st	7:23	4	-1	0:57	Rice	28-yard field goal by Christian VanSickle (#31)	0	3
1st	4:38	4	35	1:35	Rice	Bradley Rozner (#2) 13-yard touchdown reception from TJ McMahon (#7), Christian VanSickle (#31) kick good	0	10
2nd	10:17	11	70	7:07	Rice	TJ McMahon (#7) 9-yard touchdown run, Christian VanSickle (#31) kick good	0	17
2nd	6:59	1	91	-	Rice	Interception returned 91 yards for touchdown by Gabe Taylor (#26), Christian VanSickle (#31) kick good	0	24
2nd	3:26	5	20	2:05	Rice	Ari Broussard (#30) 2-yard touchdown run, Christian VanSickle (#31) kick good	0	31
3rd	14:31	2	77	0:23	McNeese State	Deonta McMahon (#20) 62-yard touchdown run, Garrison Smith (#37) kick good	7	31
3rd	14:20	1	75	0:11	Rice	Bradley Rozner (#2) 75-yard touchdown reception from TJ McMahon (#7), Christian VanSickle (#31) kick good	7	38
3rd	9:35	6	80	2:57	Rice	Jack Bradley (#87) 17-yard touchdown reception from TJ McMahon (#7), Christian VanSickle (#31) kick good	7	45
3rd	3:10	7	60	1:41	McNeese State	23-yard field goal by Garrison Smith (#37)	10	45
4th	13:14	11	75	4:56	Rice	Juma Otoviano (#8) 15-yard touchdown reception from TJ McMahon (#7), Christian VanSickle (#31) kick good	10	52
"TOP" = time of possession. For other American football terms, see Glossary of American football.							10	52

=== Vs. Alcorn State ===
Alcorn State Braves (0–2) vs. McNeese State Cowboys (0–2)

Quarter	1	2	3	4	Total
Braves	0	21	3	6	30
Cowboys	0	3	14	2	19

at Cowboy Stadium • Lake Charles, LA

- Date: September 17th
- Game time: 7:00 P.M CST
- Game attendance: 18,629
- Referee: Ed Ardito
- TV: ESPN3

=== Vs. Mississippi College ===
Mississippi College Choctaws (1–2) vs. McNeese State Cowboys (0–3)

Quarter	1	2	3	4	Total
Cowboys	8	10	7	7	32
Choctaws	7	0	7	3	17

at Cowboy Stadium • Lake Charles, LA

- Date: September 24th
- Game time: 7:00 P.M CST
- Game attendance: 10,105
- Referee: Gary Leeper
- TV: ESPN+

=== At No. 11 Incarnate Word ===
McNeese State Cowboys at Incarnate Word Cardinals

Quarter	1	2	3	4	Total
Cowboys	0	10	3	7	20
No. 11 Cardinals	14	7	7	20	48

at Gayle and Tom Benson Stadium, San Antonio, TX

- Date: October 1
- Game time: 6:05 p.m.
- Game weather: Temperature: 88 • Wind: E 8 mph • Weather: Clear
- Game attendance: 2,542
- Referee: Craig Helser
- TV announcers (ESPN+): Paul Alexander (play-by-play), Karl Schoening (analyst) and Sam Kaman (sideline)
- Box Score

Game information

First Quarter

- UIW – 12:10 Lindsey Scott Jr. 7 yard run, Carson Mohr kick
  UIW 7–0 Drive: 8 plays, 75 yards, 2:50
- UIW – 0:44 Lindsey Scott, Jr. 7 yard run, Carson Mohr kick
  UIW 14–0 Drive: 6 plays, 19 yards, 3:05

Second Quarter

- MSU – 10:04 Garrison Smith 39 yard field goal
  UIW 14–3 Drive: 13 plays, 53 yards, 5:40
- MSU – 2:12 Deonta McMahon 3 yard run, Garrison Smith kick
  UIW 14–10 Drive: 10 plays, 42 yards, 4:52
- UIW – 0:04 Taylor Grimes 11 yard pass from Lindsey Scott Jr., Carson Mohr kick
  UIW 21–10 Drive: 8 plays, 62 yards, 2:00

Third Quarter

- MSU – 10:58 Garrison Smith 47 yard field goal
  UIW 21–13 Drive: 10 plays, 45 yards, 4:02
- UIW – 3:40 Taylor Grimes 33 yard pass from Lindsey Scott Jr., Carson Mohr kick
  UIW 28–13 Drive: 8 plays, 81 yards, 2:31

Fourth Quarter

- MSU – 12:13 Josh Parker 1 yard run, Garrison Smith kick
  UIW 28–20 Drive: 12 plays, 56 yards, 6:17
- UIW – 8:20 Lindsey Scott, Jr. 5 yard run, Kevin Nguyen run failed
  UIW 34–20 Drive: 12 plays, 74 yards, 3:45
- UIW – 2:22 CJ Hardy 23 yard pass from Lindsey Scott, Jr., Carson Mohr kick
  UIW 41–20 Drive: 10 plays, 61 yards, 3:08
- UIW – 0:40 Taylor Grimes 6 yard pass from Lindsey Scott, Jr., Carson Mohr kick
  UIW 48–20 Drive: 3 plays, 32 yards, 1:03

Passing

- MSU – Knox Kadum 13/26, 144 YDS
- UIW – Lindsey Scott Jr. 25/35, 347 YDS, 4 TD

Rushing

- MSU – Deonta McMahon 17 ATT, 88 YDS, 1 TD
- UIW – Marcus Cooper 25 ATT, 135 YDS

Receiving

- MSU – Mason Pierce 5 REC, 60 YDS
- UIW – Taylor Grimes 8 REC, 115 YDS, 3 TD

=== Vs. Texas A&M-Commerce ===
	1	2	3	4	Total
Lions	7	10	3	20	40
Cowboys	8	7	0	0	15

=== At Nicholls ===
McNeese State Cowboys at Nicholls Colonels

Quarter	1	2	3	4	Total
Cowboys	0	22	7	6	35
Colonels	7	7	20	6	40

at Manning Field at John L. Guidry Stadium, Thibodaux, LA

- Date: October 22
- Game time: 3:00 p.m.
- Game weather: Sunny
- Game attendance: 5,788
- Referee: Nolan Dumas
- TV: ESPN+

=== Vs. Southeastern Louisiana ===
Southeastern Louisiana Lions at McNeese State Cowboys

Quarter	1	2	3	4	Total
Lions	7	7	7	7	28
Cowboys	6	14	7	0	27

at Cowboy Stadium, Lake Charles, LA

- Date: October 29
- Game time: 7:00 p.m.
- Game weather: Cloudy
- Game attendance: 8,068
- Referee: Gary Leeper
- TV: ESPN+

=== Vs. Eastern Illinois ===
	1	2	3	4	Total
Panthers	0	7	0	8	15
Cowboys	10	9	7	3	29

=== At Houston Christian ===
	1	2	3	4	Total
Cowboys	0	7	7	7	21
Huskies	0	7	3	0	10

=== Vs. Lamar ===
	1	2	3	4	Total
Cardinals	0	17	3	0	20
Cowboys	0	21	0	3	24

Statistics

Statistics	Lamar	McNeese
First downs	19	13
Total yards	369	314
Rushing yards	219	268
Passing yards	150	46
Turnovers	2	0
Time of possession	35:47	24:13

Team	Category	Player	Statistics
Lamar	Passing	Nick Yockey	19-27; 150 total yards; long 18 yards
Lamar	Rushing	Major Bowden	11 attempts; 92 total yards; long 30 yards
Lamar	Receiving	Major Bowden	2 receptions; 35 total yards; long 18 yards
McNeese	Passing	Ryan Roberts	6-14; 46 yards total; long 14 yards
McNeese	Rushing	Deonata McMahon	20 attempts; 241 total yards; long 79 yards
McNeese	Receiving	Jon McCall	2 receptions; 22 total yards; long 14 yards
