= 2022 Northwestern State Demons football team =

American college football season

2022 Northwestern State Demons football
- Conference: Southland Conference
- Record: 4–7 (4–2 Southland)
- Head coach: Brad Laird (5th season)
- Offensive coordinator: Beau Blair (1st season)
- Offensive scheme: Spread
- Defensive coordinator: Weston Glaser (1st season)
- Base defense: 3–3–5
- Home stadium: Harry Turpin Stadium

2022 Southland Conference football standings
	Conf.			Overall
Team	W		L	W		L
No. 12 Southeastern Louisiana +^	5	–	1	9	–	4
No. 3 Incarnate Word +^	5	–	1	12	–	2
Northwestern State	4	–	2	4	–	7
Nicholls	3	–	3	3	–	8
Texas A&M–Commerce *	3	–	3	5	–	6
McNeese	2	–	4	4	–	7
Houston Christian	1	–	5	2	–	9
Lamar	1	–	5	1	–	10
+ – Conference co-champions; ^ – FCS playoff participant; * – Texas A&M–Commerce ineligible for FCS postseason play due to transition from NCAA Division II; Rankings from STATS Poll

The 2022 Northwestern State Demons football team represented Northwestern State University as a member of the Southland Conference during the 2022 NCAA Division I FCS football season. Led by fifth-year head coach Brad Laird, the Demons played their home games at Harry Turpin Stadium in Natchitoches, Louisiana.

== Preseason ==
=== Preseason poll ===
The Southland Conference released their preseason poll on July 20, 2022. The Demons were picked to finish fifth in the conference.

=== Preseason All–Southland Teams ===
The Southland Conference announced the 2022 preseason all-conference football team selections on July 13, 2022. Northwestern State had a total of 5 players selected.

Offense

2nd Team

- Scooter Adams – Running Back, RS-JR

Defense

1st Team

- Shemar Bartholomew – Defensive Back, SR
- PJ Herrington – Defensive Back, SR

2nd Team

- Isaiah Longino – Defensive Lineman, SR
- Jomard Valsin – Defensive Lineman, SR

== Schedule ==
Northwestern State finalized their 2022 schedule on January 17, 2022.

Date	Time	Opponent	Site	TV	Result	Attendance
September 3	2:00 p.m.	at No. 3 Montana*	Washington–Grizzly Stadium; Missoula, MT	ESPN+	L 0–47	24,096
September 10	6:00 p.m.	vs. Grambling State*	Independence Stadium; Shreveport, LA		L 21–47	12,591
September 17	6:00 p.m.	at Southern Miss*	M. M. Roberts Stadium; Hattiesburg, MS	ESPN3	L 10–64	26,202
September 24	3:35 pm	Lamar	Harry Turpin Stadium; Natchitoches, LA	ESPN+	W 35–27	4,371
October 1	3:30 p.m.	Nicholls	Harry Turpin Stadium; Natchitoches, LA (NSU Challenge)	ESPN+	W 36–33	3,883
October 8	2:00 p.m.	at Eastern Illinois*	O'Brien Field; Charleston, IL	ESPN+	L 27–35	3,153
October 15	6:00 p.m.	at Houston Christian	Husky Stadium; Houston, TX	ESPN+	W 37–10	1,963
October 22	1:00 p.m.	No. 16 Southeast Missouri State*^{†}	Harry Turpin Stadium; Natchitoches, LA	ESPN+	L 16–51	4,326
November 5	2:00 p.m.	at Texas A&M–Commerce	Memorial Stadium; Commerce, TX	ESPN+	W 41–14	3,814
November 12	6:00 p.m.	at No. 25 Southeastern Louisiana	Strawberry Stadium; Hammond, LA (rivalry)	ESPN3	L 7–23	5,019
November 19	1:00 p.m.	No. 5 Incarnate Word	Harry Turpin Stadium; Natchitoches, LA	ESPN+	L 7–66	3,142
*Non-conference game; ^{†}Homecoming; Rankings from STATS Poll released prior to the game; All times are in Central time

== Game summaries ==
=== At No. 3 Montana ===
	1	2	3	4	Total
Demons	0	0	0	0	0
No. 3 Grizzles	13	13	7	14	47

=== Vs. Grambling State ===
	1	2	3	4	Total
Demons	7	0	7	7	21
Tigers	14	27	6	0	47

=== At Southern Miss ===
	1	2	3	4	Total
Demons	0	0	10	0	10
Golden Eagles	13	28	16	7	64

=== Lamar ===
	1	2	3	4	Total
Cardinals	10	0	3	14	27
Demons	0	21	14	0	35

Statistics

Statistics	Lamar	Northwestern State
First downs	24	20
Total yards	394	545
Rushing yards	92	179
Passing yards	302	366
Turnovers	1	2
Time of possession		

Team	Category	Player	Statistics
Lamar	Passing	Nick Yockney	19/39-1; 255 total yards; longest - 49 yards
Lamar	Rushing	Damashja Harris	11 attempts; 41 total yards; 13 long
Lamar	Receiving	Sevonne Rhea	2 receptions; 64 total yards; 41 long
Northwestern State	Passing	Zachary Clement	28/49-1; 366 total yards; 80 long
Northwestern State	Rushing	Kenneth Lacy	4 attempts; 83 yards; 55 long; 1 TD
Northwestern State	Receiving	Javon Antonio	9 receptions; 127 total yards; 49 long; 2 TDs

=== Nicholls ===
	1	2	3	4	Total
Colonels	7	17	3	6	33
Demons	0	14	7	15	36

=== At Eastern Illinois ===
	1	2	3	4	Total
Demons	7	0	7	13	27
Panthers	21	14	0	0	35

=== At Houston Christian ===
	1	2	3	4	Total
Demons	24	0	0	13	37
Huskies	0	0	10	0	10

=== No. 16 Southeast Missouri State ===
	1	2	3	4	Total
No. 16 Redhawks	23	14	14	0	51
Demons	3	0	13	0	16

=== At Texas A&M-Commerce ===
	1	2	3	4	Total
Demons	14	7	13	7	41
Lions	0	14	0	0	14

=== At No. 25 Southeastern Louisiana ===
Northwestern State Demons at Southeastern Louisiana Lions

Quarter	1	2	3	4	Total
Demons	0	0	7	0	7
Lions	7	16	0	0	23

at Strawberry Stadium, Hammond, LA

- Date: November 12
- Game time: 4:00 p.m.
- Game weather: Cloudy
- Game attendance: 5,019
- Referee: Craig Heiser
- TV: ESPN3

=== No. 5 Incarnate Word ===
Incarnate Word Cardinals at Northwestern State Demons

Quarter	1	2	3	4	Total
No. 5 Cardinals	14	17	21	14	66
Demons	7	0	0	0	7

at Harry Turpin Stadium, Natchitoches, LA

- Date: November 19
- Game time: 1:05 p.m.
- Game weather: Temperature: 47 • Wind: S 5 mph • Weather: Cloudy
- Game attendance: 3,142
- Referee: Gary Leeper
- TV announcers (ESPN+): Patrick Netherton (play-by-play), Gary Reasons (analyst), and Tyler Moody (sideline)
- Box Score

Game information

First Quarter

- NSU – 9:59 LC Greenwood 1 yard pass from Zachary Clement, Eddie Godina kick
  NSU 7–0 Drive 12 plays, 75 yards, 5:01
- UIW – 6:19 Darion Chafin 10 yard pass from Lindsey Scott Jr., Carson Mohr kick
  Tied 7–7 Drive 10 plays, 66 yards, 3:34
- UIW – 0:11 Taylor Grimes 16 yard pass from Lindsey Scott, Jr., Carson Mohr kick
  UIW 14–7 Drive 8 plays, 80 yards, 2:42

Second Quarter

- UIW – 8:40 Lindsey Scott, Jr. 18 yard run, Carson Mohr kick
  UIW 21–7 Drive 6 plays, 45 yards, 1:17
- UIW – 4:24 Jaelin Campbell 4 yard pass from Lindsey Scott, Jr., Carson Mohr kick
  UIW 28–7 Drive 6 plays, 65 yards, 1:40
- UIW – 0:00 Carson Mohr 31 yard field goal
  UIW 31–7 Drive 3 plays, 44 yards, 0:18

Third Quarter

- UIW – 14:18 Darion Chafin 51 yard pass from Lindsey Scott, Jr., Carson Mohr kick
  UIW 38–7 Drive 3 plays, 63 yards, 0:37
- UIW – 7:07 Marcus Cooper 67 yard run, Carson Mohr kick
  UIW 45–7 Drive 2 plays, 90 yards, 0:41
- UIW – 2:46 Darion Chafin 48 yard pass from Lindsey Scott, Jr., Carson Mohr kick
  UIW 52–7 Drive 5 plays, 71 yards, 1:11

Fourth Quarter

- UIW – 14:46 Marcus Cooper 78 yard run, Carson Mohr kick
  UIW 59–7 Drive 2 plays, 79 yards, 0:21
- UIW – 8:04 Jarrell Wiley 39 yard run, Carson Mohr kick
  UIW 66–7 Drive 5 plays, 74 yards, 1:30

Passing

- UIW – Lindsey Scott Jr. 24/36, 382 YDS, 5 TD
- NSU – Zachary Clement 28/25, 239 YDS, 1 TD, 1 INT

Rushing

- UIW – Marcus Cooper 20 ATT, 254 YDS, 2 TD
- NSU – Jordan Banks 17 ATT, 39 YDS

Receiving

- UIW – Darion Chafin 6 REC, 143 YDS, 3 TD
- NSU – Zach Patterson 8 REC, 64 YDS

== Personnel ==
2022 Northwestern State Demons football team roster
Players
Coaches
Offense

Pos.	#	Name	Class
WR	1	Javon Antonio	Jr
QB	2	Kaleb Fletcher	Sr
WR	3	LC Greenwood	Sr
WR	4	Ke’Nard King	So
WR	5	Jaren Mitchell	Jr
RB	6	Scooter Adams	Jr
WR	7	Kareame Cotton Jr.	Fr
RB	8	Garrison Johnson	Jr
WR	9	Andy Pierre-Antoine	Sr
WR	10	Zach Patterson	Jr
WR	11	Jaheim Walters	Fr
QB	13	Zachary Clement	So
QB	15	Miles Fallin	Sr
QB	16	Chance Newman	Jr
WR	17	Jamel Thomas	Sr
QB	18	Gabe Smith	Fr
QB	19	B J Higgins	Fr
WR	20	Hogan Wasson	Fr
RB	21	Kolbe Burrell	So
RB	25	London Williams	Fr
RB	28	Kennieth Lacy	So
WR	30	Micah Jernigan	So
RB	35	SirMichael Veasley	So
WR	39	Ian Bell	Fr
RB	42	Jay Sturgis	Fr
TE	43	Jaylon Glosson	Fr
OL	50	Cameron Vaughn	So
OL	51	Teeshaun Turpin	Sr
OL	53	Landon Blubaugh	Fr
OL	56	Matt Mabry	Jr
OL	57	Riley Birdwell	Fr
OL	58	Coby James	Fr
OL	64	Brody Heard	Fr
OL	65	Brayden Staggs	So
OL	66	D'Andre Richard	So
OL	67	Jordan Cooper	So
OL	68	Kaden Garcia	Fr
OL	69	Ryan Lira	Fr
OL	70	Alyzcha Ulufale-Hentz	Jr
OL	71	Stevie Ballard	So
OL	72	Rod Chaney	Jr
OL	75	Jordan McClaine	Fr
OL	77	Joey Milburn	Sr
WR	81	T.J. Johnson	Fr
TE	82	Monte Johnson	Fr
WR	83	Drake Beck	Sr
TE	84	Travon Jones	Fr
WR	85	Christian Thomas	Fr
WR	86	Duce Hart	Fr
WR	87	Caleb LaBoy	Sr
WR	88	Stanley King	So
WR	89	Dane Wallace	Fr

Defense

Pos.	#	Name	Class
LB	0	Jomard Valsin	Sr
S	1	Keenan Leachman	Jr
S	2	PJ Herrington	Sr
CB	3	Shemar Bartholomew	Sr
CB	4	Cedric Anderson	Jr
LB	5	Josh Clarke	Sr
LB	6	Jordan Banks	Fr
CB	7	William Hooper	Sr
LB	10	Dez Williams	So
S	11	Jacob Washington	Jr
CB	13	AJ Burns	Fr
S	14	Cadillac Rhone	Fr
CB	15	Ty Hall	So
S	17	DJ Johnson	Fr
CB	18	Dante Thomas	Fr
LB	19	Kwame Sarkodie	Jr
S	20	Kevin Davis Jr.	So
LB	21	Jared Pedraza	So
S	22	Jabari Reddock	Sr
S	23	Ronnie Caldwell	So
S	24	Tay Coleman	So
S	25	Isaiah Robinson	So
LB	26	Christian Hawkins	Fr
S	27	Antwon Fegans	Fr
S	29	Trey Williams	Sr
DE	30	Miles Dickens	Jr
LB	31	Matthew Broad	So
S	32	Ara Rauls III	So
DE	33	Isaiah Longino	Sr
LB	35	Ja’Quel Mack	Fr
DL	36	Christian Thomas	Fr
CB	38	Daniel Dufour	Fr
LB	40	Tory Morgan	Fr
LB	42	Jaeden Ward	Jr
LB	43	Kyren Brown	So
LB	45	Danny Sears	Fr
DE	48	John Daigle	So
LB	49	Race Moser	Sr
DT	50	Koruth Wilson	Fr
LB	51	Chad Gooden Jr.	Fr
DL	54	Kendal Harmon	Fr
DT	55	JaQuon Lott	Jr
DT	59	Maurice Campbell II	Jr
DL	91	Kevondre Burton	Fr
DL	93	Ray Gibson	So
DL	95	Johnny Mitchell	Fr
DL	96	JaBralen Yarber	Jr
DT	99	Donovan Green	So

Special teams

Pos.	#	Name	Class
K, P	9	Eddie Godina	Sr
K, P	46	Scotty Roblow	So
LS	47	Andrew Barnhill	Fr
LS	55	Sawyer Benson	Fr

Head coach

- Brad Laird (Northwestern State)

Coordinators/assistant coaches

- De'Von Lockett (Bethel (TN))
  Defensive backs
- Beau Blair (Stephen F. Austin)
  Offensive line
- Weston Glaser (Sam Houston State)
  Defensive coordinator
- Manny Harris (Texas–San Antonio)
  Wide receivers
- Jordan Hopkins (Lamar)
  Defensive line
- Josh Jones (Arkansas Tech)
  Safeties
- Kyle Washington (Angelo State)
  Quarterbacks
- Peyton Cox (Mississippi)
  Volunteer Equipment Assistant

Legend

- (C) Team captain
- (S) Suspended
- (I) Ineligible
- Injured
- Redshirt

Roster
