= 2022 Nicholls Colonels football team =

American college football season

2022 Nicholls Colonels football
- Conference: Southland Conference
- Record: 3–8 (3–3 Southland)
- Head coach: Tim Rebowe (8th season)
- Offensive coordinator: Rob Christophel (8th season)
- Offensive scheme: Spread
- Defensive coordinator: Tommy Rybacki (8th season)
- Base defense: Multiple 4–3
- Home stadium: Manning Field at John L. Guidry Stadium

2022 Southland Conference football standings
| | Conf. | | | Overall |
| Team | W | | L | W | | L |
|---|---|---|---|---|---|---|
| No. 12 Southeastern Louisiana +^ | 5 | – | 1 | 9 | – | 4 |
| No. 3 Incarnate Word +^ | 5 | – | 1 | 12 | – | 2 |
| Northwestern State | 4 | – | 2 | 4 | – | 7 |
| Nicholls | 3 | – | 3 | 3 | – | 8 |
| Texas A&M–Commerce * | 3 | – | 3 | 5 | – | 6 |
| McNeese | 2 | – | 4 | 4 | – | 7 |
| Houston Christian | 1 | – | 5 | 2 | – | 9 |
| Lamar | 1 | – | 5 | 1 | – | 10 |
+ – Conference co-champions; ^ – FCS playoff participant; * – Texas A&M–Commerce ineligible for FCS postseason play due to transition from NCAA Division II; Rankings from STATS Poll

The 2022 Nicholls Colonels football team represented Nicholls State University as a member of the Southland Conference during the 2022 NCAA Division I FCS football season. Led by eighth-year head coach Tim Rebowe, the Colonels compiled an overall record of 3–8 with a mark of 3–3 in conference play, tying for fourth place in the Southland. Nicholls played home games at Manning Field at John L. Guidry Stadium in Thibodaux, Louisiana.

== Preseason ==
=== Preseason poll ===
The Southland Conference released their preseason poll on July 20, 2022. The Colonels were picked to finish third in the conference.

=== Preseason All–Southland Teams ===
The Southland Conference announced the 2022 preseason all-conference football team selections on July 13, 2022. Nicholls had a total of 10 players selected.

Offense

1st Team

- Collin Guggenheim – Running Back, SO
- Lee NeGrotto – Tight End/Halfback, SO
- K.J. Franklin – Wide Receiver, JR
- Evan Roussel – Offensive Lineman, SO
- Gavin Lasseigne – Placekicker, JR

2nd Team

- Kohen Granier – Quarterback, SR
- Mark Barthelemy – Offensive Lineman, SR

Defense

1st Team

- Perry Ganci – Defensive Lineman, JR

2nd Team

- Hayden Shaheen – Linebacker, SO
- Jordan Jackson – Defensive Back, JR

== Personnel ==
2022 Nicholls Colonels football team roster
Players
Coaches
Offense

| Pos. | # | Name | Class |
|---|---|---|---|
| WR | 0 | Neno Lemay | Fr |
| WR | 1 | Terry Matthews | So |
| WR | 2 | K. J. Franklin | Jr |
| RB | 3 | John Carrington III | Jr |
| RB | 4 | Marquese Albert | So |
| WR | 5 | David Robinson Jr. | Jr |
| WR | 8 | Al'Dontre Davis | Sr |
| TE | 9 | Lee Negrotto | So |
| QB | 10 | Leonard Kelly | So |
| QB | 11 | Dillon Monette | Fr |
| QB | 12 | Jakob Foss | Fr |
| WR | 13 | Mike Gray Jr. | Fr |
| QB | 15 | Kohen Granier | Sr |
| QB | 16 | Christian Arceneaux | Fr |
| WR | 17 | Tank McMath | Fr |
| RB | 19 | Collin Guggenheim | So |
| RB | 20 | Jake Dalmado | Fr |
| WR | 23 | Jason Barnes Jr. | Fr |
| RB | 26 | Dalen Gondron | Fr |
| RB | 28 | Julien Gums | Sr |
| RB | 30 | Corey Warren Jr. | Fr |
| WR | 33 | Kyler Paul | Fr |
| RB | 35 | Jaylon Spears | Fr |
| TE | 42 | Ja'Cobey Lee | Jr |
| TE | 43 | Nathan Hebb | So |
| TE | 49 | Jacob Parker | Jr |
| OL | 54 | Cohen Barrilleaux | Fr |
| OL | 57 | Jeremiah James | Jr |
| OL | 59 | Baylee Trusty | Sr |
| OL | 61 | Reed Lambert | So |
| OL | 62 | Seth Trahan | Fr |
| OL | 63 | Ethan Bairnsfather | Jr |
| OL | 65 | Donald Fleming | Fr |
| OL | 66 | Sameij Scott | Fr |
| OL | 67 | Owen Melville | So |
| OL | 68 | Robbie Pizzolato | Fr |
| OL | 69 | Zakk McKeehan | Jr |
| OL | 70 | Titus Jones | Jr |
| OL | 71 | Evan Roussel | So |
| OL | 72 | Cohen Troxclair | Fr |
| OL | 73 | Kerwin Mitchell Jr. | Fr |
| OL | 74 | DeAndre’ Keller | So |
| OL | 75 | Mark Barthelemy | Sr |
| OL | 76 | Ryan Bernard | Fr |
| OL | 77 | Mikhail Hill | Sr |
| OL | 78 | Jaden Ben | So |
| OL | 79 | Cru Blanchard | Fr |
| WR | 80 | Scrappy Osby | Fr |
| WR | 81 | Treylin Whaley | Fr |
| TE | 82 | Brandon Hubicz | So |
| WR | 83 | Dany'e Brooks | Fr |
| WR | 84 | Navell Chopin | So |
| WR | 85 | Lance Williams | So |
| WR | 86 | Tyren Montgomery | Jr |
| WR | 87 | Ja’Corey Wells | Fr |
| TE | 89 | Logan Wilcox | So |

Defense

| Pos. | # | Name | Class |
|---|---|---|---|
| DB | 6 | Jordan Jackson | Jr |
| LB | 7 | Brandon Lairy | Jr |
| LB | 10 | Hayden Shaheen | So |
| LB | 11 | Quinton Sharkey | Sr |
| DB | 12 | Willie Butler Jr. | Fr |
| DB | 14 | Bryce Authement | So |
| DB | 16 | James Tobin IV | Sr |
| DB | 17 | Ma’Lyk Smith | Fr |
| DB | 18 | Markeyvrick Eddie | So |
| DL | 18 | Juan Monjarres | Sr |
| DB | 20 | Sterling McKeithen | So |
| DB | 21 | Elijah Winters | Fr |
| DB | 21 | Malik Woodery | So |
| DB | 22 | Tyreke Boyd | So |
| LB | 23 | Aaron Calcote | Sr |
| DB | 24 | Chancellor Hitchens | So |
| LB | 25 | Elijah Reames | Jr |
| DB | 26 | Keontae Williams | So |
| DB | 27 | Maurquel Price | So |
| DB | 29 | Chase Brown | Sr |
| DB | 31 | Tyler Morton | So |
| DB | 32 | Shawn Hall | Jr |
| DB | 33 | Logan Scott | So |
| DB | 34 | Paxton Martin | So |
| LB | 36 | Hayden Seneca | Fr |
| DB | 37 | Hugh Gregory Hamer | Fr |
| DB | 37 | Ethan Lee | Fr |
| LB | 39 | Connor Orgeron | Fr |
| DB | 41 | Zane McCrary | So |
| LB | 42 | Lonnie Kinchen | Fr |
| DB | 43 | Caleb Lee | So |
| LB | 44 | Eli Ennis | Fr |
| DL | 45 | Alex Villavaso | Fr |
| LB | 47 | Braydon Johnson | Fr |
| DL | 48 | Anthony Brown | Fr |
| DB | 49 | Josh Wax | Fr |
| LB | 50 | Ahmad Paige | Fr |
| LB | 51 | Tylan Turner | So |
| LB | 52 | Kaiden Jones | Fr |
| LB | 52 | Lance Rockwood Jr. | So |
| DL | 54 | Marcus Dickey | Fr |
| DL | 56 | Rasheed Lovelace | Fr |
| LB | 57 | Hayden Cormier | Fr |
| LB | 58 | Kylin White | Fr |
| DL | 59 | Deondre Diggs | Sr |
| DL | 61 | Moses Clark | Fr |
| DL | 65 | Christian Mannino | Fr |
| DL | 88 | Theodore Tyler | Jr |
| DL | 90 | Joshua Martin | Fr |
| DL | 91 | Zack Bernard | So |
| DL | 92 | Elinus Noel III | So |
| DL | 93 | Jamiran James | Jr |
| DL | 94 | Nick Williams | Fr |
| DL | 95 | Dillion Davis | So |
| DL | 96 | Glen Thurmond | Sr |
| DL | 97 | Dane Whalen | So |
| DL | 98 | Perry Ganci | Jr |
| DL | 99 | JaQuan Frank | Fr |

Special teams

| Pos. | # | Name | Class |
|---|---|---|---|
| K/P | 34 | Patrick Vanderbrook | Fr |
| K/P | 38 | Kylan Dupre | Fr |
| K/P | 40 | William Bryant | Fr |
| K | 46 | Gavin Lasseigne | Jr |
| P | 48 | Hayden Asprion | Fr |
| LS | 50 | Jackson McFarland | Fr |
| LS | 53 | Dominic Brocato | Sr |

Head coach

- Tim Rebowe (LSU)

Coordinators/assistant coaches

- Rob Christophel (Austin Peay State)
  Offensive coordinator/qb
- Tommy Rybacki (Jacksonville State)
  Defensive coordinator
- Russ Gisclair (Nicholls State)
  Tight ends
- Toren Joseph (Nicholls State)
  Safeties
- Tylan Martin (Jacksonville State)
  Running backs
- Darion Monroe (Tulane)
  Cornerbacks
- Sean Murphy (Millsaps College)
  Wide receivers
- Kyle Skierski (UC Davis)
  Offensive line
- Brian Wallace (Louisiana College)
  Defensive line

Legend

- (C) Team captain
- (S) Suspended
- (I) Ineligible
- Injured
- Redshirt

Roster

== Schedule ==
Nicholls finalized their 2022 schedule on March 3, 2022.

| Date | Time | Opponent | Site | TV | Result | Attendance |
|---|---|---|---|---|---|---|
| September 3 | 4:00 p.m. | at South Alabama* | Hancock Whitney Stadium; Mobile, AL | ESPN3 | L 7–48 | 15,101 |
| September 10 | 7:00 p.m. | at Louisiana–Monroe* | Malone Stadium; Monroe, LA | ESPN3 | L 7–35 | 13,536 |
| September 17 | 2:00 p.m. | at Southeast Missouri* | Houck Stadium; Cape Girardeau, MO | ESPN+ | L 16–42 | 3,482 |
| September 24 | 3:00 p.m. | Jacksonville State* | Manning Field at John L. Guidry Stadium; Thibodaux, LA | ESPN+ | L 21–52 | 7,231 |
| October 1 | 3:30 p.m. | at Northwestern State | Harry Turpin Stadium; Natchitoches, LA (NSU Challenge) | ESPN+ | L 33–36 | 3,883 |
| October 8 | 6:00 p.m. | at Houston Christian | Husky Stadium; Houston, TX | ESPN+ | W 19–17 | 1,823 |
| October 15 | 3:00 p.m. | No. 8т Incarnate Word ‡ | Manning Field at John L. Guidry Stadium; Thibodaux, LA | ESPN+ | L 14–49 | 5,122 |
| October 22 | 3:00 p.m. | McNeese State | Manning Field at John L. Guidry Stadium; Thibodaux, LA | ESPN+ | W 40–35 | 5,788 |
| October 29 | 3:00 p.m. | at Lamar | Provost Umphrey Stadium; Beaumont, TX | ESPN3 | L 17–24 | 2,916 |
| November 12 | 3:00p.m. | Texas A&M–Commerce | Manning Field at John L. Guidry Stadium; Thibodaux, LA | ESPN+ | W 12–10 | 5,021 |
| November 17 | 6:00 p.m. | No. 23 Southeastern Louisiana | Manning Field at John L. Guidry Stadium; Thibodaux, LA (River Bell Classic) | ESPN+ | L 17–40 | 7,911 |
*Non-conference game; Rankings from STATS Poll released prior to the game; All times are in Central time

‡The game vs. Incarnate Word was previously scheduled as a non-conference game, and was retained as such, even though both schools are still in the Southland Conference.

== Game summaries ==
=== At South Alabama ===
Nicholls Colonels (0–0) at South Alabama Jaguars (0–0)

| Quarter | 1 | 2 | 3 | 4 | Total |
|---|---|---|---|---|---|
| Colonels | 0 | 0 | 0 | 7 | 7 |
| Jaguars | 10 | 17 | 14 | 7 | 48 |

at Hancock Whitney Stadium, Mobile, AL

- Date: September 3, 2022
- Game time: 4:00 p.m. CDT
- Game weather: Sunny • Temperature: 88 °F (31 °C) • Wind: SE 4 mph
- Game attendance: 15,101
- Referee: Javarro Edwards
- TV announcers (ESPN3): J.D. Byars (play-by-play) and Pat Greenwood (analyst)

Game information

First Quarter

- (4:05) USA – La'Damian Webb 15-yard run, Diego Guajardo kick (Drive: 6 plays, 80 yards, 2:48; South Alabama 7–0)
- (1:54) USA – Diego Guajardo 39-yard field goal (Drive: 4 plays, 3 yards, 1:29; South Alabama 10–0)

Second Quarter

- (13:50) USA – Jalen Wayne 52-yard pass from Carter Bradley, Diego Guajardo kick (Drive: 4 plays, 83 yards, 1:17; South Alabama 17–0)
- (9:27) USA – Carter Bradley 4-yard run, Diego Guajardo kick (Drive: 1 play, 4 yards, 0:08; South Alabama 24–0)
- (1:30) USA – Diego Guajardo 48-yard field goal (Drive: 14 plays, 54 yards, 5:26; South Alabama 27–0)

Third Quarter

- (6:58) USA – Jalen Wayne 37-yard pass from Carter Bradley, Diego Guajardo kick (Drive: 4 plays, 66 yards, 1:17; South Alabama 34–0)
- (3:52) USA – Braylon McReynolds 18-yard pass from Carter Bradley, Diego Guajardo kick (Drive: 5 plays, 60 yards, 2:07; South Alabama 41–0)

Fourth Quarter

- (14:24) NSU – Julien Gums 10-yard run, Gavin Lasseigne kick (Drive: 9 plays, 75 yards, 4:28; South Alabama 41–7)
- (11:22) USA – La'Damian Webb 2-yard run, Diego Guajardo kick (Drive: 7 plays, 77 yards, 2:56; South Alabama 48–7)

| Statistics | NICH | USA |
|---|---|---|
| First downs | 10 | 24 |
| Total yards | 165 | 508 |
| Rushing yards | 59 | 176 |
| Passing yards | 106 | 332 |
| Passing: Comp–Att–Int | 15–28–1 | 26–35–0 |
| Time of possession | 25:11 | 34:49 |

| Team | Category | Player | Statistics |
|---|---|---|---|
| Nicholls | Passing | Kohen Granier | 15/27, 106 yards, INT |
| Nicholls | Rushing | Julien Gums | 9 carries, 33 yards, TD |
| Nicholls | Receiving | Neno Lemay | 3 receptions, 40 yards |
| South Alabama | Passing | Carter Bradley | 17/25, 260 yards, 3 TD |
| South Alabama | Rushing | La'Damian Webb | 18 carries, 98 yards, 2 TD |
| South Alabama | Receiving | Jalen Wayne | 3 receptions, 98 yards, 2 TD |

=== At Louisiana-Monroe ===
| Team | 1 | 2 | 3 | 4 | Total |
|---|---|---|---|---|---|
| Nicholls | 7 | 0 | 0 | 0 | 7 |
| • ULM | 0 | 21 | 7 | 7 | 35 |

- Date: September 10
- Location: Malone Stadium (Monroe, LA)
- Game start: 7:00 p.m.
- Game attendance: 13,536
- Game weather: 80 °F (27 °C) • Weather: Sunny • Wind: N 8 MPH
- Referee: Chris Tallent
- Television network: ESPN3

| Statistics | ULM | Nicholls |
|---|---|---|
| First downs | 14 | 23 |
| Total yards | 306 | 424 |
| Rushing yards | 75 | 167 |
| Passing yards | 231 | 257 |
| Turnovers | 1 | 0 |
| Time of possession | 28:45 | 31:15 |

| Team | Category | Player | Statistics |
|---|---|---|---|
| ULM | Passing | Chandler Rogers | 20–25, 253 yards, 2 TD |
| ULM | Rushing | Malik Jackson | 12 carries, 55 yards, 1 TD |
| ULM | Receiving | Alred Luke | 3 receptions, 72 yards |
| Nicholls | Passing | Kohen Granier | 26–42, 231 yards, 1 TD, 1 INT |
| Nicholls | Rushing | Julien Gums | 9 carries, 35 yards |
| Nicholls | Receiving | Lee Negrotto | 2 receptions, 43 yards |

=== At Southeast Missouri State ===
| | 1 | 2 | 3 | 4 | Total |
|---|---|---|---|---|---|
| Colonels | 0 | 7 | 9 | 0 | 16 |
| Redhawks | 7 | 14 | 14 | 7 | 42 |

=== Jacksonville State ===
| | 1 | 2 | 3 | 4 | Total |
|---|---|---|---|---|---|
| Gamecocks | 14 | 21 | 17 | 0 | 52 |
| Colonels | 7 | 7 | 0 | 7 | 21 |

=== At Northwestern State ===
| | 1 | 2 | 3 | 4 | Total |
|---|---|---|---|---|---|
| Colonels | 7 | 17 | 3 | 6 | 33 |
| Demons | 0 | 14 | 7 | 15 | 36 |

=== At HCU ===
| | 1 | 2 | 3 | 4 | Total |
|---|---|---|---|---|---|
| Colonels | 3 | 3 | 7 | 6 | 19 |
| Huskies | 0 | 0 | 14 | 3 | 17 |

=== No. 8т Incarnate Word ===
Incarnate Word Cardinals at Nicholls Colonels

| Quarter | 1 | 2 | 3 | 4 | Total |
|---|---|---|---|---|---|
| No. 8т Cardinals | 14 | 7 | 21 | 7 | 49 |
| Colonels | 0 | 7 | 0 | 7 | 14 |

at Manning Field at John L. Guidry Stadium, Thibodaux, LA

- Date: October 15
- Game time: 3:00 p.m.
- Game weather: Sunny
- Game attendance: 5,122
- Referee: Gary Leeper
- TV announcers (ESPN+): Jack Benjamin (play-by-play) and Ronnie Rantz (analyst)
- Box Score

Game information

First Quarter

- UIW – 8:15 CJ Hardy 30 yard pass from Lindsey Scott Jr., Carson Mohr kick
  UIW 7–0 Drive: 7 plays, 80 yards, 1:46
- UIW – 4:47 Taylor Grimes 4 yard pass from Lindsey Scott, Jr., Carson Mohr kick
  UIW 14–0 Drive 7 plays 50 yards 2:30

Second Quarter

- UIW – 13:30 Marcus Cooper 7 yard pass from Lindsey Scott, Jr., Carson Mohr kick
  UIW 21–0 Drive 13 plays, 79 yards, 4:58
- NSU – 6:16 Lee Negrotto 17 yard pass from Kohen Granier, Gavin Lasseigne kick
  UIW 21–7 Drive 8 plays, 63 yards, 3:43

Third Quarter

- UIW – 12:19 Marcus Cooper 14 yard run, Carson Mohr kick
  UIW 28–7 Drive 9 plays, 81 yards, 2:36
- UIW – 6:41 Taylor Grimes 20 yard pass from Lindsey Scott, Jr., Carson Mohr kick
  UIW 35–7 Drive 10 plays, 80 yards, 4:02
- UIW – 1:48 Darion Chafin 15 yard pass from Lindsey Scott, Jr., Carson Mohr kick
  UIW 42–7 Drive 10 plays 85 yards 3:13

Fourth Quarter

- NSU – 14:04 Leonard Kelly 1 yard run, Gavin Lasseigne kick
  UIW 42–14 Drive 9 plays, 63 yards, 2:44
- UIW – 9:41 Jaelin Campbell 14 yard pass from Steven Duncan, Carson Mohr kick
  UIW 49–14 Drive 10 plays, 75 yards, 4:23

Passing

- UIW – Lindsey Scott Jr. 27/36, 327 YDS, 5 TD
- NSU – Leonard Kelly 12/26, 114 YDS, 2 INT

Rushing

- UIW – Marcus Cooper 20 ATT, 137 YDS, 1 TD
- NSU – Collin Guggenheim 9 ATT, 78 YDS

Receiving

- UIW – Taylor Grimes 10 REC, 125 YDS, 2 TD
- NSU – Lee Negrotto 3 REC, 46 YDS, 1 TD

=== McNeese ===
McNeese State Cowboys at Nicholls Colonels

| Quarter | 1 | 2 | 3 | 4 | Total |
|---|---|---|---|---|---|
| Cowboys | 0 | 22 | 7 | 6 | 35 |
| Colonels | 7 | 7 | 20 | 6 | 40 |

at Manning Field at John L. Guidry Stadium, Thibodaux, LA

- Date: October 22
- Game time: 3:00 p.m.
- Game weather: Sunny
- Game attendance: 5,788
- Referee: Nolan Dumas
- TV: ESPN+

=== At Lamar ===
| | 1 | 2 | 3 | 4 | Total |
|---|---|---|---|---|---|
| Colonels | 0 | 3 | 14 | 0 | 17 |
| Cardinals | 0 | 14 | 7 | 3 | 24 |

Statistics

| Statistics | Nicholls | Lamar |
|---|---|---|
| First downs | 23 | 16 |
| Total yards | 365 | 344 |
| Rushing yards | 170 | 267 |
| Passing yards | 195 | 77 |
| Turnovers | 0 | 0 |
| Time of possession | 19:24 | 30:36 |

| Team | Category | Player | Statistics |
|---|---|---|---|
| Nicholls | Passing | Kohen Granier | 18/29; 148 total yards; long 67 yards |
| Nicholls | Rushing | Julien Gums | 21 attempts; 100 total yards; long 10 yards |
| Nicholls | Receiving | David Robinson | 3 receptions; 80 yards; long 67 yards |
| Lamar | Passing | Michael Chandler | 6/13; 77 yards total; long 25 yards |
| Lamar | Rushing | Khalan Griffin | 17 attempts; 134 total yards; long 35 yards |
| Lamar | Receiving | S. Rhea | 3 receptions; 31 total yards; long 15 yards |

=== Texas A&M-Commerce ===
| | 1 | 2 | 3 | 4 | Total |
|---|---|---|---|---|---|
| Lions | 10 | 0 | 0 | 0 | 10 |
| Colonels | 0 | 3 | 7 | 2 | 12 |

=== No. 23 Southeastern Louisiana ===
Southeastern Louisiana Lions at Nicholls Colonels

| Quarter | 1 | 2 | 3 | 4 | Total |
|---|---|---|---|---|---|
| No. 23 Lions | 10 | 20 | 7 | 3 | 40 |
| Colonels | 7 | 10 | 0 | 0 | 17 |

at Manning Field at John L. Guidry Stadium, Thibodaux, LA

- Date: November 17
- Game time: 6:00 p.m.
- Game weather: Sunny
- Game attendance: 7,911
- Referee: Ed Bourgeois
- TV: ESPN+
