= Cephus Johnson =

American football player (born 1999)

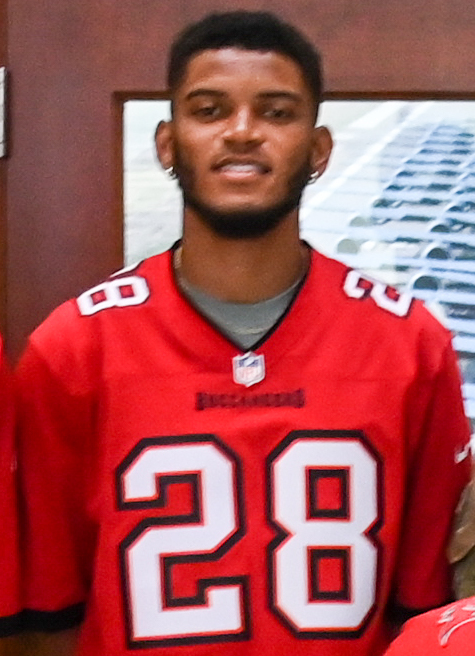
- Johnson with the Tampa Bay Buccaneers in 2023

Utah Tech Trailblazers
- Title: Offensive analyst

Personal information
- Born: September 21, 1999 (age 27); Mobile, Alabama, U.S.
- Listed height: 6 ft 5 in (1.96 m)
- Listed weight: 220 lb (100 kg)

Career information
- High school: Davidson (Mobile)
- College: South Alabama (2017–2019); Southeastern Louisiana (2020–2022)
- NFL draft: 2023: undrafted

Career history

Playing
- Minnesota Vikings (2023)*; Tampa Bay Buccaneers (2023–2024)*; Hamilton Tiger-Cats (2025)*
- * Offseason or practice squad member only

Coaching
- Utah Tech (2025–present) Offensive analyst
- Stats at Pro Football Reference
- Stats at CFL.ca

Cephus Lee Johnson III (born September 21, 1999) is an American professional football wide receiver who is currently an offensive analyst at Utah Tech, a position he has held since 2025. He played college football at South Alabama and Southeastern Louisiana.

== Early life ==
Johnson was born on September 21, 1999, in Mobile, Alabama. He attended Davidson High School where he was a four-year letterwinner for football and also lettered in basketball for his freshman year. During high school, he threw a school-record 1,849 yards and 22 touchdowns and earned second-team All-Regional and All-State honorable mention during his senior year.

== College career ==
=== South Alabama ===
Johnson redshirted his true freshman season at South Alabama. He appeared in eight games during his redshirt freshman season and completed 7-of-19 attempts for 120 yards and 3 touchdowns. He entered as the team's projected starting quarterback during his sophomore year. Johnson started eight games while throwing for 900 yards, 5 touchdowns, and 7 interceptions.

=== Southeastern Louisiana ===
After the 2019 season, Johnson transferred to Southeastern Louisiana. In the 2020 season, he played seven games as a reserve quarterback and a wide receiver. Johnson also completed all three passes for 67 yards and a touchdown while receiving 30 rushing attempts for 142 yards and a touchdown. During the 2021 season, he split time between being a backup quarterback and a wide receiver. He played 11 games while receiving 37 carries and completing 5 out of 12 passes for 149 yards and a touchdown. During his senior season in 2022, he established career highs, receiving a total of 1,527 passing yards, 651 rushing yards, and 8 rushing touchdowns.

== Professional career ==
Pre-draft measurables
Height	Weight	Arm length	Hand span	40-yard dash	10-yard split	20-yard split	20-yard shuttle	Three-cone drill	Vertical jump	Broad jump	Bench press
6 ft 5 1/8 in (1.96 m)	223 lb (101 kg)	33 5/8 in (0.85 m)	8 5/8 in (0.22 m)	4.60 s	1.59 s	2.59 s	4.49 s	7.25 s	36.5 in (0.93 m)	10 ft 1 in (3.07 m)	18 reps
All values from Pro Day

=== Minnesota Vikings ===
After not being selected in the 2023 NFL draft, Johnson signed with the Minnesota Vikings as an undrafted free agent. He was waived on August 7, 2023.

=== Tampa Bay Buccaneers ===
On August 13, 2023, Johnson signed with the Tampa Bay Buccaneers. He signed a reserve/future contract on January 23, 2024. He was waived on August 25, 2024.

=== Hamilton Tiger-Cats ===
On January 14, 2025, Johnson signed with the Hamilton Tiger-Cats of the Canadian Football League (CFL).
