= Carlos Washington Jr. =

American football player (born 1998)

No. 26 – Miami Dolphins
- Position: Running back
- Roster status: Practice squad

Personal information
- Born: December 26, 1998 (age 27); Clinton, Maryland, U.S.
- Listed height: 5 ft 11 in (1.80 m)
- Listed weight: 210 lb (95 kg)

Career information
- High school: Riverdale Baptist School (Upper Marlboro, Maryland)
- College: New Hampshire (2017–2021); Southeastern Louisiana (2022)
- NFL draft: 2023: undrafted

Career history
- Atlanta Falcons (2023–2025); Miami Dolphins (2026–present)

Career NFL statistics as of 2025
- Games played: 2
- Stats at Pro Football Reference

Carlos Washington Jr. (born December 26, 1998) is an American professional football running back for the Miami Dolphins of the National Football League (NFL). He played college football for the New Hampshire Wildcats and Southeastern Louisiana Lions. After going unselected in the 2023 NFL draft, he signed with the Atlanta Falcons.

== Early life ==
Washington grew up in Clinton, Maryland, and attended Riverdale Baptist School. During high school, he completed 1,200 rushing yards, 300 receiving yards and 20 touchdowns as a senior and was named the Washington Post All-Met Honorable Mention and the team MVP. He was an unranked running back recruit and committed to play for the University of New Hampshire.

== College career ==
=== University of New Hampshire ===
Washington redshirted during his true freshman season in 2017. During the 2018 season, he played in all 11 games and started two of them. He finished the season with 99 rushes, 582 rushing yards, six rushing touchdowns, seven touchdowns, 10 kickoff returns and 10 kickoff return yards. During the 2019 season, he played in all 11 games and started the first seven. He finished the season with 138 rush attempts, 28 receptions, 792 all-purpose yards, 138 rushes for 601 yards and three touchdowns. During the 2020 season, he played in and started their only game of the season where he completed 10 rush attempts for 30 yards. During the 2021 season, he played in 10 games and started nine of them. He finished the season with 117 rush attempts for 547 yards and a touchdown.

On December 8, 2021, Washington announced that he would be entering the transfer portal. He ultimately transferred to Southeastern Louisiana University.

=== Southeastern Louisiana University ===
During the 2022 season, he played in 12 games with 10 starts. He finished the season with 147 rushing attempts for 715 yards and 15 touchdowns.

== Professional career ==
Pre-draft measurables
Height	Weight	Arm length	Hand span	Wingspan	40-yard dash	10-yard split	20-yard split	20-yard shuttle	Three-cone drill	Vertical jump	Broad jump	Bench press
5 ft 10 3/8 in (1.79 m)	207 lb (94 kg)	30 in (0.76 m)	9 1/4 in (0.23 m)	6 ft 0 1/4 in (1.84 m)	4.60 s	1.53 s	2.53 s	4.41 s	7.09 s	34.0 in (0.86 m)	9 ft 6 in (2.90 m)	14 reps
All values from Pro Day

=== Atlanta Falcons ===
On April 29, 2023, Washington was signed to the Atlanta Falcons as an undrafted free agent after going unselected in the 2023 NFL draft. He was waived on August 29. Washington was re-signed to the practice squad on September 20. Following the end of the 2023 regular season, he signed a reserve/future contract with the Falcons on January 10, 2024.

Washington was waived by the Falcons on August 27, 2024, and re-signed to the practice squad. He was promoted to the active roster on December 11.

On August 26, 2025, Washington was waived by the Falcons as part of final roster cuts and re-signed to the practice squad the next day. He signed a reserve/future contract with Atlanta on January 5, 2026. Washington was released by the Falcons on May 11.

=== Miami Dolphins ===
On May 21, 2026, Washington signed with the Miami Dolphins. On August 30, he was waived by Miami as a part of final roster cuts and re-signed to the practice squad. He was promoted to the active roster on October 3 but waived two days later. On October 7, Washington was re-signed to the practice squad.
