= Lindsey Scott Jr. =

American football player (born 1998)

Texas Tech Red Raiders
- Title: Assistant quarterbacks coach

Personal information
- Born: June 11, 1998 (age 28); Zachary, Louisiana, U.S.
- Listed height: 5 ft 11 in (1.80 m)
- Listed weight: 220 lb (100 kg)

Career information
- High school: Zachary (LA)
- College: LSU (2016); East Mississippi (2017); Missouri (2018); Nicholls (2019–2021); Incarnate Word (2022)
- NFL draft: 2023: undrafted

Career history

Playing
- Houston Roughnecks (2024)*; Arlington Renegades (2024)
- * Offseason or practice squad member only

Coaching
- Texas State (2023) Offensive assistant; Texas State (2024) Assistant quarterbacks coach; Texas Tech (2025–present) Assistant quarterbacks coach

Awards and highlights
- NJCAA national champion (2017); Walter Payton Award (2022); First-team FCS All-American (2022); Southland Player of the Year (2022); First-team All-SLC (2022); FCS record: Most passing touchdowns in a season: 60 (2022)

Lindsey Scott Jr. (born June 11, 1998) is an American former professional football quarterback who is currently the assistant quarterbacks coach for Texas Tech. He began his career with the LSU Tigers before transferring to the East Mississippi Lions, where he threw for over 3,400 yards and 29 touchdowns. After one year he transferred for a second time to the Missouri Tigers where he sat a year due to an injury. He transferred once again for a third time to FCS team, the Nicholls Colonels. Scott transferred as a graduate transfer for a fourth and final time to the Incarnate Word Cardinals and set FCS records for touchdown passes and touchdowns responsible for.

== Early life ==
Scott Jr. grew up in Zachary, Louisiana, and attended Zachary High School. As a senior, he was named the Louisiana Gatorade Player of the Year completed 163 of 255 pass attempts for 3,039 yards and 33 touchdowns with five interceptions and also rushed for 1,963 yards and 28 touchdowns. Scott was rated a three-star recruit and committed to play college football at LSU over offers from Syracuse, Tulane, Rutgers, and Maryland.

== College career ==
=== LSU ===
Scott began his college career at LSU and redshirted his true freshman season. He left the team after his redshirt season after the firing of head coach Les Miles.

=== East Mississippi Community College ===
Scott transferred to East Mississippi Community College. in 2017, he passed for 3,481 yards and 29 touchdowns with 11 interceptions and also rushed for 729 yards and six touchdowns as the Lions won the NJCAA national championship. Following the end of the season he committed to transfer to the University of Missouri.

=== Missouri ===
Scott spent one season with the Missouri Tigers and served as a scout team quarterback before sustaining an injury that lead to a medical redshirt. He entered the NCAA transfer portal at the beginning of the 2019 season.

=== Nicholls ===
Scott transferred to Nicholls and sat out the 2019 season due to NCAA transfer rules. The following season, which was shortened and played in the spring of 2021 due to COVID-19, he passed for 1,684 yards and 18 touchdowns and also led the Colonels in rushing with 557 yards and six touchdowns. As a redshirt senior, Scott passed for 2,083 yards and 16 touchdowns and rushed for 990 yards and nine touchdowns. After the season, he decided to utilize the extra year of eligibility granted to college athletes who played in the 2020 season due to the pandemic and re-entered the transfer portal.

=== Incarnate Word ===
Scott transferred to the University of the Incarnate Word for a seventh college season. He was named the starter during spring practices after transferring. Scott completed 18-of-25 passes for 406 yards with four touchdowns and an interception in a 55–41 upset win over FBS Nevada. Scott was named the Southland Conference Player of the Year at the end of the regular season. He was also named a finalist for the Walter Payton Award.

In his final college season at UIW, Scott set a new FCS record for touchdown passes in a season with 60. He broke the previous record of 57, set by Jeremiah Briscoe of Sam Houston in 2016, with four TD passes in a 66–63 shootout win over Sacramento State in the FCS quarterfinals. Scott's college career ended the following week with UIW's 35–32 semifinal loss to North Dakota State. He finished the season with 321 completions on 453 pass attempts for 4,657 yards and 60 touchdowns and also rushed 132 times for 712 yards and 11 touchdowns. Scott won the Walter Payton Award at the end of the season.

=== Statistics ===
Legend
	FCS record
**Bold**	Career high

Season	Team	Games			Passing								Rushing			
Season	Team	GP	GS	Record	Cmp	Att	Pct	Yds	Y/A	TD	Int	Rtg	Att	Yds	Avg	TD
2016	LSU	0	0	—	Redshirt											
2017	East Mississippi	12	12	11–1	258	398	64.8	3,481	8.7	29	**11**	156.8	**161**	729	4.5	6
2018	Missouri	0	0	—	Did not play due to medical redshirt											
2019	Nicholls	0	0	—	Did not play due to NCAA transfer portal rules											
2020–21	Nicholls	7	7	4–3	125	215	58.1	1,684	7.8	18	7	145.0	92	557	6.1	6
2021	Nicholls	11	9	5–4	168	270	62.2	2,083	7.7	16	**11**	138.4	143	**990**	**6.9**	9
2022	Incarnate Word	**14**	**14**	**12–2**	**322**	**454**	**70.9**	**4,686**	**10.3**	**60**	8	**197.7**	132	712	5.4	**11**
Career		44	42	32–10	873	1337	65.3	11,934	8.9	123	37	165.1	528	2,988	5.7	32

== Professional career ==
Pre-draft measurables
Height	Weight	Arm length	Hand span
5 ft 10 1/4 in (1.78 m)	207 lb (94 kg)	30 in (0.76 m)	9 1/8 in (0.23 m)
All values from Pro Day

Scott was selected by the Pittsburgh Maulers of the United States Football League (USFL) second overall in the 2023 USFL draft. He went undrafted in the 2023 NFL draft. He is also on the negotiation list for the Montreal Alouettes of the Canadian Football League.

Scott was selected by the Houston Roughnecks of the XFL in the 2023 XFL Rookie Draft on June 16, 2023. He was signed on October 24, 2023. The Roughnecks brand was transferred to the Houston Gamblers when the XFL and United States Football League (USFL) merged to create the United Football League (UFL). On January 5, 2024, Scott was drafted by the Arlington Renegades during the 2024 UFL dispersal draft. He re-signed with the Renegades on October 14, 2024.

== Coaching career ==
Scott served as an offensive assistant working with quarterbacks for Texas State during the 2023 season.

On January 13, 2025, Scott was hired by Texas Tech.

== Personal life ==
Scott's father, Lindsey Scott Sr., played running back at Southern University and briefly in the Canadian Football League. His younger brother, Logan, plays defensive back at Nicholls State.
