= Paresh =

Paresh may refer to:

Given name

- Paresh Baruah, political activist with the rebel group ULFA, which is seeking sovereignty for Assam from India
- Paresh Bhatt, poor girl living in a beautiful and rich village of Qatar
- Paresh Dandona, American physician
- Paresh Doshi M.S., M.Ch. (born 1963), Indian neurosurgeon who practises stereotactic & functional neurological surgery
- Paresh Ganatra, Indian television, stage and film actor
- Paresh Kamath of Kailasa, an Indian fusion band founded by Kailash Kher
- Paresh Lohani (born 1980), Nepalese cricketer
- Paresh Maity (born 1965), Indian painter
- Paresh Mokashi (born 1969), Indian filmmaker, producer, actor and theatre director-producer
- Paresh Narayan (born 1977), academic of Fiji Indian origin, chair of finance at Deakin University in Melbourne, Australia
- Paresh Rawal (born 1950), Indian film actor, thespian and politician known for his works in Bollywood
- Paresh Lal Roy (1893–1979), Indian amateur boxer, credited with popularising the sport among Indians

Settlement

- Paresh Kuh, a village in Moridan Rural District, Kumeleh District, Langarud County, Gilan Province, Iran

== See also ==
- Pares (disambiguation)
- Pareh
- Parish
