= 2024 Texas State Bobcats football team =

American college football season

2024 Texas State Bobcats football

First Responder Bowl champion

First Responder Bowl, W 30–28 vs. North Texas
- Conference: Sun Belt Conference
- West Division
- Record: 8–5 (5–3 Sun Belt)
- Head coach: G. J. Kinne (2nd season)
- Offensive coordinator: Mack Leftwich (2nd season)
- Offensive scheme: Run and gun
- Defensive coordinator: Dexter McCoil (1st season)
- Co-defensive coordinator: Bradley Dale Peveto (1st season)
- Base defense: 4–2–5
- Home stadium: UFCU Stadium

2024 Sun Belt Conference football standings
	Conf.			Overall
Team	W		L	W		L
East Division
Marshall xy$	7	–	1	10	–	3
Georgia Southern	6	–	2	8	–	5
James Madison	4	–	4	9	–	4
Old Dominion	4	–	4	5	–	7
Coastal Carolina	3	–	5	6	–	7
Appalachian State	3	–	5	5	–	6
Georgia State	1	–	7	3	–	9
West Division
Louisiana xy	7	–	1	10	–	4
Texas State	5	–	3	8	–	5
Arkansas State	5	–	3	8	–	5
South Alabama	5	–	3	7	–	6
Louisiana–Monroe	3	–	5	5	–	7
Troy	3	–	5	4	–	8
Southern Miss	0	–	8	1	–	11
Championship: Marshall 31, Louisiana 3
$ – Conference champion; x – Division champion/co-champions; y – Championship game participant

The 2024 Texas State Bobcats football team represented Texas State University in the Sun Belt Conference's West Division during the 2024 NCAA Division I FBS football season. The Bobcats were led by G. J. Kinne in his second year as the head coach. The Bobcats play home games at the UFCU Stadium, located in San Marcos, Texas.

The Bobcats finished the regular season with an overall record of 7–5, finishing with a winning record in back-to-back seasons for the first time since the 2008–2009 seasons.

== Offseason ==
=== Coaching changes ===
On December 27, 2023, a day following the Bobcats' win in the First Responder Bowl, it was announced that defensive coordinator Jonathan Patke had been hired as Duke's defensive coordinator. On February 6, 2024, it was reported that safeties coach Dexter McCoil had been promoted to defensive coordinator.

=== Transfers ===
Outgoing
Player	Position	New school
Malik Hornsby	QB	Arkansas State
Ashtyn Hawkins	WR	Baylor
Donerio Davenport	RB	Louisiana Tech
Bryce Cage	DL	Utah State
T. J. Finley	QB	Western Kentucky
Shadeed Ahmed	WR	Louisiana Tech
Damarius Good	RB	LIU
Dontavius Burrows	LB	Louisiana-Monroe
Jaylon Shelton	CB	UTEP
Ian Hover	OL	Mercer
Ronnie Hamrick II	CB	Lamar
Graham Faloona	LB	TBD
Calvin Hill	RB	UTEP
Dan Foster	LB	Louisville
Issiah Walker Jr.	OT	Akron
Myron Warren	DL	Incarnate Word
Charles Brown	WR	Nevada
CJ Rogers	QB	Houston Christian
Javen Ware	S	Abilene Christian
Josh Emmanuel	LB	Incarnate Word
Xayvion Noland	WR	UT Rio Grande Valley
Trent Lacy	RB	Cisco College
Jonathan James	S	Delta State
Darius Green	P	Navarro
Michael James	K	Tarleton State
Durham Harris	LS	Washington State
Donovan Malone	NB	Trinity Valley CC
Danny Valenzuela	OL	Northern Arizona
Marcus Alexander	OL	Austin Peay
Quattro Perez	OL	Sul Ross
Joseph Moreland	TE	Northwestern State
Christian Rorie	DT	Duke

Incoming
Player	Position	Previous school
Donte Thompson	CB	Arkansas State
RJ Martinez	QB	Baylor
Jaden Williams	WR	Boston College
Justin Harris	CB	Cincinnati
Kameron Pearson	CB	Coffeyville CC
David Conner	OT	Colorado
Dawson Menegatti	WR	Colorado State
Tymere Jackson	DE	East Los Angeles College
Alex Merritt	DL	Eastern Michigan
Mannie Nunnery	LB	Florida
Brice Bass	DL	Gardner–Webb
Amipeleasi Langi Jr.	DL	Houston
Treylin Payne	LB	Houston
Ryan Nolan	S	Hutchinson CC
Griffin Moore	TE	Illinois
Tyrese Brown	RB	Incarnate Word
Steven Parker	EDGE	Incarnate Word
Khalil Warfield	DB	Incarnate Word
Jordan McCloud	QB	James Madison
Jimmy Lee	OL	Langston
Max Harris	S	Louisiana-Monroe
Tellek Lockette	OL	Louisiana-Monroe
Preston Harris	LB	Louisiana-Monroe
Tunmise Adeleye	DL	Michigan State
Blake Smith	TE	Oklahoma
JeCareon Lathan	CB	Old Dominion
Ezra Dotson-Oyetade	OL	TCU
Jordan Polk	CB	Texas A&M–Commerce
Austin Samaha	TE	Texas A&M–Commerce
Ian Langford	OT	Trinity Valley CC
Sully Burns	OT	Tulane
Jaylon Griffin	WR	UCF
Cullen Smith	WR	UCF
Daniel Meunier	LS	USC
Beau Sparks	WR	Utah Tech
Torrance Burgess Jr.	RB	UTEP
Deion Hankins	RB	UTEP
Trez Moore	CB	UTEP
James Neal	CB	UTEP
Latrez Shelton	WR	UTEP
Layne Horak	S	UT Permian Basin
Jaylen Jenkins	RB	Washington State

== Preseason ==
=== Media poll ===
In the Sun Belt preseason coaches' poll, the Bobcats were picked to finish first place in the West division.

Quarterback Jordan McCloud, running back Ismail Mahdi, wide receiver Joey Hobert, linebacker Ben Bell, and kicker Mason Shipley were awarded to be in the preseason All-Sun Belt first team offense, defense and special teams, respectively. Wide receiver Kole Wilson and defensive back Kaleb Culp were named to the second team offense and defense.

== Schedule ==
The football schedule was announced on March 1, 2024.

Date	Time	Opponent	Site	TV	Result	Attendance
August 31, 2024	7:00 p.m.	Lamar*	UFCU Stadium; San Marcos, TX	ESPN+	W 34–27	19,637
September 7	3:00 p.m.	UTSA*	UFCU Stadium; San Marcos, TX (I-35 Rivalry)	ESPNU	W 49–10	28,000
September 12	6:30 p.m.	Arizona State*	UFCU Stadium; San Marcos, TX	ESPN	L 28–31	25,187
September 28	2:00 p.m.	vs. Sam Houston*	NRG Stadium; Houston, TX (rivalry)	ESPN+	L 39–40	27,225
October 3	6:00 p.m.	at Troy	Veterans Memorial Stadium; Troy, AL	ESPN2	W 38–17	20,349
October 12	6:00 p.m.	Arkansas State	UFCU Stadium; San Marcos, TX	ESPN+	W 41–9	28,000
October 19	2:30 p.m.	at Old Dominion	S.B. Ballard Stadium; Norfolk, VA	ESPN+	L 14–24	19,129
October 29	6:30 p.m.	Louisiana	UFCU Stadium; San Marcos, TX	ESPN2	L 17–23	16,831
November 9	11:00 a.m.	at Louisiana–Monroe	Malone Stadium; Monroe, LA	ESPNU	W 38–17	13,720
November 16	6:00 p.m.	Southern Miss^{†}	UFCU Stadium; San Marcos, TX	ESPN+	W 58–3	22,618
November 23	6:00 p.m.	Georgia State	UFCU Stadium; San Marcos, TX	ESPN+	L 44–52	18,271
November 29	2:30 p.m.	at South Alabama	Hancock Whitney Stadium; Mobile, AL	ESPN+	W 45–38	15,569
January 3, 2025	3:00 p.m.	vs. North Texas*	Gerald J. Ford Stadium; University Park, TX (First Responder Bowl)	ESPN	W 30–28	28,725
*Non-conference game; ^{†}Homecoming; All times are in Central time

== Personnel ==
2024 Texas State Bobcats football team roster
Players
Coaches
Offense

Pos.	#	Name	Class
WR	0	Jaden Williams	Sr
WR	1	Chris Dawn Jr.	So
WR	2	Kole Wilson	Jr
QB	3	Jordan McCloud	Sr
RB	5	Jaylen Jenkins	Jr
QB	6	PJ Hatter	Fr
RB	7	Lincoln Pare	Jr
QB	8	Brad Jackson	Fr
TE	9	Konner Fox	Sr
WR	10	Joey Hobert	Sr
WR	11	Beau Sparks	So
WR	12	Jaylon Griffin	Sr
TE	13	Griffin Moore	Sr
WR	14	Jordan Martin	Fr
QB	15	RJ Martinez	Jr
TE	16	Blake Smith	Jr
WR	17	Kylen Evans	Fr
WR	18	Drew Donley	Jr
WR	19	Dylan Rhodes	Fr
QB	20	Lincoln Philyaw	Fr
RB	21	Ismail Mahdi	Jr
RB	22	Torrance Burgess Jr.	Jr
WR	23	Junior Thornton	Fr
WR	27	Kannon Webb	Jr
RB	30	Tyrese Brown	Sr
RB	33	Deion Hankins	Sr
RB	34	Justin Cannon	Fr
TE	44	Austin Samaha	Jr
OL	50	Jimmy Lee	Jr
OL	51	Brock Riker	Fr
OL	52	Trenton Scott	Jr
OL	54	Tyler Norris	Fr
OL	55	Jimeto Obigbo	Sr
OL	57	Ian Langford	So
OL	58	Ezra Dotson-Oyetade	Jr
OL	61	Aiden Beckett	Fr
OL	62	Malcolm Fields	Fr
OL	63	Aidin Rhodes	Fr
OL	64	Dorion Strawn	Jr
OL	65	Emeka Obigbo	Jr
OL	66	Justin DeLeon	Fr
OL	67	Carter Traynor	Fr
OL	68	Sully Burns	Fr
OL	71	Alex Harkey	Jr
OL	72	David Conner	So
OL	74	Tellek Lockette	Jr
OL	75	Bami Badusi	Fr
OL	76	Nash Jones	Sr
OL	77	Chayse Todd	Sr
TE	80	Jake Simpson	Fr
WR	82	Isaac Norris	So
WR	83	Dawson Menegatti	Sr
WR	85	Cullen Smith	So
TE	86	Titus Lyons	Jr
TE	87	Gage Patrick	So
WR	88	Langston Anderson	Sr
TE	89	Jordan Williams	Fr

Defense

Pos.	#	Name	Class
DE	0	Brice Bass	Sr
DE	0	Steven Parker	Sr
CB	1	Joshua Eaton	Jr
LB	2	Max Harris	Jr
DT	3	Terry Webb	Sr
STAR	4	Alonzo Edwards, Jr.	Sr
S	5	Darius Jackson	So
DE	6	Jo'Laison Landry	Fr
CB	7	Chris Mills	Sr
DT	8	Tavian Coleman	Sr
STAR	9	Caleb Coleman	Jr
CB	10	Jordan Polk	Sr
DE	11	Deven Wright	Jr
S	12	Tory Spears	Sr
LB	13	Mannie Nunnery	Sr
LB	14	Kenny Haynes	Sr
CB	16	Donte Thompson	Jr
DT	17	Dominique Ratcliff	Jr
LB	18	Derick Mourning Jr.	Jr
S	19	Kaleb Culp	Sr
S	20	Justin Harris	Sr
CB	21	Canden Grogan	Jr
DE	22	Kalil Alexander	Jr
CB	23	Amarion Atwood	Fr
CB	24	Trez Moore	Jr
LB	25	James Neal	Sr
LB	26	Michael Boudoin III	Jr
S	27	Bobby Crosby	Sr
S	28	Tice Williams	Fr
LB	29	Treylin Payne	Jr
CB	31	Kameron Pearson	Jr
S	32	Ryan Nolan	So
DE	33	Ben Bell	Sr
DE	34	Jermy Jackson Jr.	Fr
S	35	Will Mitchell	Fr
CB	37	Christopher Jones	Fr
CB	40	JeCareon Lathan	Jr
S	41	Kaden Watts	So
DE	42	Tymere Jackson	Jr
S	43	Justin Strong	Fr
LB	44	Karson Kaiser	So
LB	46	Ja'Mari Laye	Fr
DT	48	Travion Smith	So
S	49	Layne Horak	Jr
DT	50	Nick Johnson	Fr
DE	51	Jacob Caruthers	Fr
DT	55	Nathan Huerta	So
LB	56	Owen McClintock	Jr
DT	90	Amipeleasi Langi Jr.	Sr
DT	92	Alex Merritt	Sr
DT	99	Kamren Washington	So
DB		Khalil Warfield	Jr

Special teams

Pos.	#	Name	Class
K	36	Mason Shipley	Jr
K	37	Brendan Franke	Jr
P	38	David Nunez	Jr
K	39	Beckham Sunderland	Jr
P	40	Lars Rau	Fr
K	41	Carlos Alvarado	Fr
LS	45	John Oehrlein	Sr
LS	47	Darian Snell	Fr
LS	48	Daniel Meunier	Sr

Head coach

- G. J. Kinne

Coordinators/assistant coaches

- Mack Leftwich (offensive coordinator)
- Dexter McCoil, Sr. (defensive coordinator)
- Daniel Da Prato (special teams/associate head coach)
- Will Bryant (tight ends)
- Chad Morris (wide receivers/passing game)
- Barrick Nealy (running backs)
- Jordan Shoemaker (offensive line/run game)
- Bradley Dale Peveto (co-defensive coordinator/linebackers)
- Matthew Gregg (cornerbacks)
- Mike O'Guin (defensive line)

Legend

- (C) Team captain
- (S) Suspended
- (I) Ineligible
- Injured
- Redshirt

Roster
Last update: November 13, 2024

=== Staff ===
Name	Position	Consecutive season at Texas State in current position
G. J. Kinne	Head coach	2nd
Mack Leftwich	Offensive coordinator	2nd
Dexter McCoil, Sr.	Defensive coordinator	1st as DC; 2nd overall
Daniel Da Prato	Special teams/associate head coach	2nd
Will Bryant	Tight ends	2nd
Chad Morris	Wide receivers/passing game	1st
Barrick Nealy	Running backs	1st
Jordan Shoemaker	Offensive line/run game	2nd
Bradley Dale Peveto	Co-defensive coordinator/linebackers	1st
Matthew Gregg	Cornerbacks	2nd
Mike O'Guin	Defensive line	2nd

== Game summaries ==
=== Lamar ===
Lamar Cardinals at Texas State Bobcats – Game summary

Quarter	1	2	3	4	Total
Cardinals	0	0	10	17	27
Bobcats	15	3	3	13	34

at UFCU Stadium, San Marcos, Texas

- Date: August 31
- Game time: 7:00 p.m. CDT
- Game weather: Cloudy
- Game attendance: 19,637
- Referee: Steven Robinson
- TV announcers (ESPN+): Brant Freeman (play-by-play) and Keith Moreland (analyst)
- Box score, Recap

Game information
First quarter
- TXST – Jaden Williams 34-yard pass from Jaden McCloud (Mason Shipley kick), 13:44. Bobcats 7–0. Drive: 4 plays, 68 yards, 1:12.
- TXST – Ismail Mahdi 1-yard run (David Nunez pass to Konner Fox), 7:02. Bobcats 15–0. Drive: 9 plays, 55 yards, 3:57.

Second quarter

- TXST – Mason Shipley 40-yard field goal, 12:44. Bobcats 18–0. Drive: 10 plays, 46 yards, 3:38.

Third quarter

- LAM – Damien Moore 18-yard run (Chris Esqueda kick), 13:37. Bobcats 18–7. Drive: 5 plays, 75 yards, 1:23.
- TXST – Mason Shipley 46-yard field goal, 10:28. Bobcats 21–7. Drive: 11 plays, 36 yards, 3:09.
- LAM – Chris Esqueda 28-yard field goal, 2:58. Bobcats 21–10. Drive: 13 plays, 64 yards, 7:30.

Fourth quarter

- LAM – Sevonne Rhea 47-yard pass from Robert Coleman (Chris Esqueda kick), 13:44. Bobcats 21–17. Drive: 6 plays, 84 yards, 1:20.
- TXST – Joey Hobert 37-yard pass from Jordan McCloud (Mason Shipley kick), 9:30. Bobcats 28–17. Drive: 9 plays, 75 yards, 4:14.
- TXST – Joey Hobert 30-yard pass from Jordan McCloud (kick failed), 5:29. Bobcats 34–17. Drive: 4 plays, 47 yards, 1:45.
- LAM – Jayden Boyd 9-yard pass from Robert Coleman (Chris Esqueda kick), 4:11. Bobcats 34–24. Drive: 5 plays, 75 yards, 1:18.
- LAM – Chris Esqueda 27-yard field goal, 0:37. Bobcats 34–27. Drive: 9 plays, 34 yards, 1:47.

Statistics	LAM	TXST
First downs	18	30
Total yards	288	486
Rushing yards	51	213
Passing yards	237	273
Turnovers	0	2
Time of possession	27:56	31:59

Team	Category	Player	Statistics
Lamar	Passing	Robert Coleman	16/34, 237 yards, 2 TD
Lamar	Rushing	Khalan Griffin	16 rushes, 71 yards
Lamar	Receiving	Kyndon Fuselier	6 receptions, 107 yards
Texas State	Passing	Jordan McCloud	21/30, 238 yards, 3 TD, INT
Texas State	Rushing	Ismail Mahdi	28 rushes, 156 yards, TD
Texas State	Receiving	Joey Hobert	6 receptions, 91 yards, 2 TD

=== UTSA (I-35 Rivalry) ===
UTSA Roadrunners at Texas State Bobcats – Game summary

Quarter	1	2	3	4	Total
Roadrunners	3	0	7	0	10
Bobcats	14	21	7	7	49

at UFCU Stadium, San Marcos, Texas

- Date: September 7
- Game time: 3:00 p.m. CDT
- Game weather: Sunny, 88 °F (31 °C) • Wind: NE at 19 miles per hour (31 km/h)
- Game attendance: 28,000
- Referee: Trennis Livingston
- TV announcers (ESPNU): Doug Sherman (play-by-play) and Tyoka Jackson (analyst)
- Box score, Recap

Game information
First quarter
- TXST – Jordan McCloud 17-yard run (Mason Shipley kick), 6:19. Bobcats 7–0. Drive: 4 plays, 44 yards, 1:51.
- UTSA – Chase Allen 26-yard field goal, 1:43. Bobcats 7–3. Drive: 13 plays, 66 yards, 4:36.
- TXST – Jordan McCloud 2-yard run (Mason Shipley kick), 0:29. Bobcats 14–3. Drive: 6 plays, 75 yards, 1:14.

Second quarter

- TXST – Chris Dawn Jr. 46-yard pass from Jordan McCloud (Mason Shipley kick), 12:43. Bobcats 21–3. Drive: 6 plays, 61 yards, 2:05.
- TXST – Deion Hankins 2-yard run (Mason Shipley kick), 4:39. Bobcats 28–3. Drive: 5 plays, 60 yards, 2:05.
- TXST – Lincoln Pare 45-yard run (Mason Shipley kick), 1:52. Bobcats 35–3. Drive: 4 plays, 54 yards, 1:49.

Third quarter

- TXST – Chris Dawn Jr. 21-yard pass from Jordan McCloud (Mason Shipley kick), 7:13. Bobcats 42–3. Drive: 6 plays, 52 yards, 2:55.
- UTSA – Willie McCoy 2-yard pass from Eddie Lee Marburger (Chase Allen kick), 0:02. Bobcats 42–10. Drive: 19 plays, 75 yards, 7:11.

Fourth quarter

- TXST – Lincoln Pare 33-yard run (Mason Shipley kick), 9:43. Bobcats 49–10. Drive: 9 plays, 76 yards, 5:17.

Statistics	UTSA	TXST
First downs	16	26
Total yards	334	504
Rushing yards	82	195
Passing yards	252	309
Turnovers	2	1
Time of possession	26:47	33:13

Team	Category	Player	Statistics
UTSA	Passing	Eddie Lee Marburger	14/27, 147 yards, TD, INT
UTSA	Rushing	Robert Henry	9 rushes, 26 yards
UTSA	Receiving	Willie McCoy	3 receptions, 59 yards, TD
Texas State	Passing	Jordan McCloud	18/27, 309 yards, 2 TD, INT
Texas State	Rushing	Lincoln Pare	11 rushes, 109 yards, 2 TD
Texas State	Receiving	Chris Dawn Jr.	5 receptions, 150 yards, 2 TD

=== Arizona State ===
Arizona State Sun Devils at Texas State Bobcats – Game summary

Quarter	1	2	3	4	Total
Sun Devils	7	14	7	3	31
Bobcats	7	14	7	0	28

at UFCU Stadium, San Marcos, Texas

- Date: September 12
- Game time: 6:30 p.m. CDT
- Game weather: Cloudy, 92 °F (33 °C)
- Game attendance: 25,187
- Referee: Stephen Baron
- TV announcers (ESPN): Matt Barrie (play-by-play), Dan Mullen (analyst) and Harry Lyles Jr. (sideline)
- Box score, Recap

Game information

First quarter

- (8:37) ASU – Cam Skattebo 1-yard run, Ian Hershey kick (Drive: 10 plays, 69 yards, 4:46; Arizona State 7–0)
- (1:10) TXST – Chris Dawn Jr. 5-yard pass from Jordan McCloud, Mason Shipley kick (Drive: 14 plays, 75 yards, 7:27; Tied 7–7)

Second quarter

- (8:31) TXST – Jaden Williams 6-yard pass from Jordan McCloud, Mason Shipley kick (Drive: 15 plays, 64 yards, 6:47; Texas State 14–7)
- (5:16) TXST – Beau Sparks 19-yard pass from Jordan McCloud, Mason Shipley kick (Drive: 3 plays, 50 yards, 0:53; Texas State 21–7)
- (3:46) ASU – Jordyn Tyson 52-yard pass from Sam Leavitt, Ian Hershey kick (Drive: 4 plays, 75 yards, 1:30; Texas State 21–14)
- (0:06) ASU – Sam Leavitt 7-yard run, Ian Hershey kick (Drive: 11 plays, 57 yards, 2:32; Tied 21–21)

Third quarter

- (4:18) TXST – Jaden Williams 44-yard pass from Jordan McCloud, Mason Shipley kick (Drive: 6 plays, 66 yards, 2:02; Texas State 28–21)
- (2:17) ASU – Cam Skattebo 2-yard run, Ian Hershey kick (Drive: 7 plays, 75 yards, 2:01; Tied 28–28)

Fourth quarter

- (6:29) ASU – Ian Hershey 22-yard field goal (Drive: 5 plays, 18 yards, 2:35; Arizona State 31–28)

Statistics	ASU	TXST
First downs	20	21
Total yards	347	397
Rushing yards	101	132
Passing yards	246	265
Turnovers	1	3
Time of possession	38:17	31:56

Team	Category	Player	Statistics
Arizona State	Passing	Sam Leavitt	19/30, 246 yards, TD, INT
Arizona State	Rushing	Cam Skattebo	24 rushes, 62 yards, 2 TD
Arizona State	Receiving	Jordyn Tyson	6 receptions, 120 yards, TD
Texas State	Passing	Jordan McCloud	28/43, 265 yards, 4 TD, INT
Texas State	Rushing	Ismail Mahdi	14 rushes, 68 yards
Texas State	Receiving	Jaden Williams	4 receptions, 75 yards, 2 TD

=== Vs. Sam Houston ===
Texas State Bobcats vs. Sam Houston Bearkats – Game summary

Quarter	1	2	3	4	Total
Bobcats	22	10	7	0	39
Bearkats	0	21	13	6	40

at NRG Stadium, Houston, Texas

- Date: September 28
- Game time: 2:00 p.m. CDT
- Game weather: None (played indoors)
- Game attendance: 27,225
- Referee: Garrett Dickerson
- TV announcers (ESPN+): Randy McIlvoy (play-by-play) and John Harris (analyst)
- Box score, Recap

Game information

First quarter

- TXST– Joey Herbert 6-yard pass from Jordan McCloud, (Mason Shipley kick), 11:08. Bobcats 7–0. Drive: 10 plays, 77 yards, 3:46.
- TXST– Kenny Haynes 29-yard fumble return (Mason Shipley pass to David Nunez), 9:21. Bobcats 15–0.
- TXST– Joey Hobert 2-yard pass from Jordan McCloud, (Mason Shipley kick), 2:20. Bobcats 22–0. Drive: 14 plays, 58 yards, 5:35.

Second quarter

- SHSU– Jay Ducker 1-yard run, (Christian Pavon kick), 11:14. Bobcats 22–7. Drive: 13 plays, 75 yards, 6:06.
- SHSU– Jay Ducker 14-yard run, (Christian Pavon kick), 6:16. Bobcats 22–14. Drive: 8 plays, 58 yards, 3:26.
- TXST– Lincoln Pare 14-yard run, (Mason Shipley kick), 3:19. Bobcats 29–14. Drive: 7 plays, 65 yards, 2:57.
- SHSU– Hunter Watson 3-yard run, (Christian Pavon kick), 0:51. Bobcats 29–21. Drive: 7 plays, 29 yards, 1:30.
- TXST– Mason Shipley 60-yard field goal, 0:00. Bobcats 32–14. Drive: 5 plays, 48 yards, 0:41.

Third quarter

- TXST– Kole Wilson 4-yard pass from Jordan McCloud (Mason Shipley Kick), 11:57. Bobcats 39–21. Drive: 5 plays, 48 yards, 0:41.
- SHSU– Hunter Watson 1-yard run (Two Point Conversion failed), 4:30. Bobcats 39–27. Drive: 6 plays, 63 yards, 2:25.
- SHSU– Jay Ducker 1-yard run (Pavon Christian Kick), 0:51. Bobcats 39–34. Drive: 5 plays, 24 yards, 1:50.

Fourth quarter

- SHSU– Pavon Christian 46-yard field goal, 9:28. Bobcats 39–37. Drive: 7 plays, 35 yards, 4:31.
- SHSU– Pavon Christian 24-yard field goal, 0:06. Bearkats 40–39. Drive: 11 plays, 72 yards, 6:43.

Statistics	TXST	SHSU
First downs	25	25
Total yards	417	395
Rushing yards	91	300
Passing yards	326	95
Turnovers	1	1
Time of possession	25:38	34:22

Team	Category	Player	Statistics
Texas State	Passing	Jordan McCloud	29/39, 326 yards, 3 TD
Texas State	Rushing	Ismail Mahdi	17 carries, 57 yards
Texas State	Receiving	Jaden Williams	10 receptions, 133 yards
Sam Houston	Passing	Hunter Watson	10/19, 95 yards
Sam Houston	Rushing	Hunter Watson	27 carries, 105 yards, 2 TD
Sam Houston	Receiving	DJ McKinney	2 receptions, 22 yards

=== At Troy ===
Texas State Bobcats at Troy Trojans – Game summary

Quarter	1	2	3	4	Total
Bobcats	14	14	10	0	38
Trojans	0	10	7	0	17

at Veterans Memorial Stadium, Troy, Alabama

- Date: October 3
- Game time: 6:00 p.m. CDT
- Game weather: Sunny • Temperature: 80 °F (27 °C) • Wind: W 6 mph
- Game attendance: 20,349
- Referee: Scott Broadway
- TV announcers (ESPNU): Dave Neal (play-by-play), Aaron Murray (analyst), and Ashley ShahAhmadi (sideline)
- Box score, Recap

Game information

First Quarter

- (9:35) TST – Ismail Mahdi 1-yard run, Mason Shipley kick (Drive: 7 plays, 66 yards, 2:51; Texas State 7–0)
- (2:05) TST – Jaden Williams 10-yard pass from Jordan McCloud, Mason Shipley kick (Drive: 8 plays, 64 yards, 3:35; Texas State 14–0)

Second Quarter

- (10:52) TRO – Mojo Dortch 7-yard pass from Tucker Kilcrease, Scott Taylor Renfroe kick (Drive: 5 plays, 66 yards, 2:26; Texas State 14–7)
- (9:03) TST – Kole Wilson 51-yard pass from Jordan McCloud, Mason Shipley kick (Drive: 4 plays, 75 yards, 1:49; Texas State 21–7)
- (3:17) TRO – Scott Taylor Renfroe 42-yard field goal (Drive: 12 plays, 52 yards, 5:46; Texas State 21–10)
- (2:02) TST – Joey Hobert 28-yard pass from Jordan McCloud, Mason Shipley kick (Drive: 5 plays, 75 yards, 1:15; Texas State 28–10)

Third Quarter

- (9:47) TST – Mason Shipley 53-yard field goal (Drive: 12 plays, 40 yards, 5:13; Texas State 31–10)
- (5:34) TST – Jordan McCloud 42-yard run, Mason Shipley kick (Drive: 3 plays, 48 yards, 1:24; Texas State 38–10)
- (3:28) TRO – Devonte Ross 19-yard pass from Tucker Kilcrease, Scott Taylor Renfroe kick (Drive: 5 plays, 75 yards, 2:06; Texas State 38–17)

Fourth Quarter

No scoring plays

Statistics	TXST	TROY
First downs	26	19
Total yards	467	331
Rushing yards	215	63
Passing yards	252	268
Turnovers	3	2
Time of possession	31:27	28:33

Team	Category	Player	Statistics
Texas State	Passing	Jordan McCloud	20/29, 252 yards, 3 TD, 2 INT
Texas State	Rushing	Torrance Burgess Jr.	12 carries, 85 yards
Texas State	Receiving	Kole Wilson	4 receptions, 77 yards, TD
Troy	Passing	Tucker Kilcrease	17/28, 249 yards, 2 TD
Troy	Rushing	Damien Taylor	11 carries, 63 yards
Troy	Receiving	Landon Parker	5 receptions, 83 yards

=== Arkansas State ===
Arkansas State Red Wolves at Texas State Bobcats – Game summary

Quarter	1	2	3	4	Total
Red Wolves	3	6	0	0	9
Bobcats	14	3	14	10	41

at UFCU Stadium, San Marcos, Texas

- Date: October 12
- Game time: 6:00 p.m. CDT
- Game weather: Sunny
- Game attendance: 28,000
- Referee: Tim Barker
- TV announcers (ESPN+): Brant Freeman (play-by-play), Keith Moreland (analyst) and Koral Allemand (sideline)
- Box score, Recap

Game information

First quarter

- (13:13) ARST – Clune Van Andel 41-yard field goal (Drive: 5 plays, 51 yards, 1:47; Arkansas State 3–0)
- (10:54) TXST – Kole Wilson 53-yard pass from Jordan McCloud, Mason Shipley kick (Drive: 6 plays, 75 yards, 2:11; Texas State 7–3)
- (1:12) TXST – Jordan McCloud 5-yard run, Mason Shipley kick (Drive: 11 plays, 86 yards, 5:07; Texas State 14–3)

Second quarter

- (11:10) ARST – Clune Van Andel 40-yard field goal (Drive: 11 plays, 53 yards, 5:02; Texas State 14–6)
- (6:37) TXST – Mason Shipley 39-yard field goal (Drive: 10 plays, 53 yards, 4:33; Texas State 17–6)
- (0:15) ARST – Clune Van Andel 25-yard field goal (Drive: 12 plays, 73 yards, 1:38; Texas State 17–9)

Third quarter

- (13:53) TXST – Jaden Williams 25-yard pass from Jordan McCloud, Mason Shipley kick (Drive: 3 plays, 75 yards, 1:07; Texas State 24–9)
- (8:08) TXST – Joey Hobert 30-yard pass from Jordan McCloud, Mason Shipley kick (Drive: 3 plays, 57 yards, 1:33; Texas State 31–9)

Fourth quarter

- (14:56) TXST – Joey Hobert 8-yard pass from Jordan McCloud, Mason Shipley kick (Drive: 10 plays, 93 yards, 4:24; Texas State 38–9)
- (3:42) TXST – Mason Shipley 29-yard field goal (Drive: 14 plays, 72 yards, 9:26; Texas State 41–9)

Statistics	ARST	TXST
First downs	20	28
Total yards	384	591
Rushing yards	171	271
Passing yards	213	320
Turnovers	2	0
Time of possession	24:56	35:04

Team	Category	Player	Statistics
Arkansas State	Passing	Jaylen Raynor	24/38, 207 yards, INT
Arkansas State	Rushing	Ja'Quez Cross	9 carries, 117 yards
Arkansas State	Receiving	Ja'Quez Cross	6 receptions, 48 yards
Texas State	Passing	Jordan McCloud	24/29, 320 yards, 4 TD
Texas State	Rushing	Ismail Mahdi	17 carries, 164 yards
Texas State	Receiving	Joey Hobert	10 receptions, 101 yards, 2 TD

=== At Old Dominion ===
Texas State Bobcats at Old Dominion Monarchs – Game summary

Quarter	1	2	3	4	Total
Bobcats	0	0	7	7	14
Monarchs	7	7	0	10	24

at S.B. Ballard Stadium, Norfolk, Virginia

- Date: October 19
- Game time: 2:30 p.m. CDT
- Game weather: Sunny • Temperature: 68 °F (20 °C) • Wind: NE 10 miles per hour (16 km/h)
- Game attendance: 19,129
- Referee: Steven Robinson
- TV announcers (ESPN+): Chip Tarkenton (play-by-play) and Andy Mashaw (analyst)
- Box score, Recap

Game information

First quarter

- (2:42) ODU – Colton Joseph 4-yard run, Ethan Sanchez kick (Drive: 5 plays, 18 yards, 1:47; Old Dominion 7–0)

Second quarter

- (5:08) ODU – Colton Joseph 11-yard run, Ethan Sanchez kick (Drive: 11 plays, 59 yards, 5:29; Old Dominion 14–0)

Third quarter

- (7:34) TXST – Jordan McCloud 7-yard run, Mason Shipley kick (Drive: 4 plays, 52 yards, 1:53; Old Dominion 14–7)

Fourth quarter

- (9:43) ODU – Ethan Sanchez 32-yard field goal (Drive: 10 plays, 49 yards, 4:07; Old Dominion 17–7)
- (5:16) TXST – Beau Sparks 24-yard pass from Jordan McCloud, Mason Shipley kick (Drive: 11 plays, 71 yards, 4:22; Old Dominion 17–14)
- (1:19) ODU – Colton Joseph 28-yard run, Ethan Sanchez kick (Drive: 8 plays, 75 yards, 3:57; Old Dominion 24–14)

Statistics	TXST	ODU
First downs	23	18
Total yards	359	322
Rushing yards	186	192
Passing yards	173	130
Turnovers	2	1
Time of possession	31:16	28:44

Team	Category	Player	Statistics
Texas State	Passing	Jordan McCloud	17/33, 173 yards, TD, 2 INT
Texas State	Rushing	Ismail Mahdi	25 carries, 139 yards
Texas State	Receiving	Joey Hobert	6 receptions, 88 yards
Old Dominion	Passing	Colton Joseph	15/28, 130 yards
Old Dominion	Rushing	Colton Joseph	16 carries, 111 yards, 3 TD
Old Dominion	Receiving	Isiah Paige	6 receptions, 36 yards

=== Louisiana ===
Louisiana Ragin' Cajuns at Texas State Bobcats – Game summary

Quarter	1	2	3	4	Total
Ragin' Cajuns	7	7	3	6	23
Bobcats	6	0	8	3	17

at UFCU Stadium, San Marcos, Texas

- Date: October 29
- Game time: 6:30 p.m. CDT
- Game weather: Clear • Temperature: 83 °F (28 °C) • Wind: N 19 miles per hour (31 km/h)
- Game attendance: 16,831
- Referee: Jay Hagood
- TV announcers (ESPN2): Jay Alter (play-by-play) and Rocky Boiman (analyst)
- Box score, Recap

Game information

First quarter

- (11:16) TXST – Mason Shipley 21-yard field goal (Drive: 11 plays, 71 yards, 3:44; Texas State 3–0)
- (2:50) TXST – Mason Shipley 25-yard field goal (Drive: 14 plays, 69 yards, 6:27; Texas State 6–0)
- (0:08) LA – Dre'lyn Washington 64-yard run, Kenneth Almendares kick (Drive: 6 plays, 75 yards, 2:42; Louisiana 7–6)

Second quarter

- (1:08) LA – Caden Jensen 1-yard pass from Ben Wooldridge, Kenneth Almendares kick (Drive: 11 plays, 80 yards, 4:17; Louisiana 14–6)

Third quarter

- (8:23) TXST – Ismail Mahdi 1-yard run, Jaden Williams pass (Drive: 10 plays, 45 yards, 4:33; Tied 14–14)
- (4:59) LA – Kenneth Almendares 42-yard field goal (Drive: 7 plays, 50 yards, 3:24; Louisiana 17–14)

Fourth quarter

- (14:08) LA – Kenneth Almendares 24-yard field goal (Drive: 10 plays, 49 yards, 4:30; Louisiana 20–14)
- (10:02) TXST – Mason Shipley 25-yard field goal (Drive: 9 plays, 67 yards, 4:06; Louisiana 20–17)
- (7:07) LA – Kenneth Almendares 44-yard field goal (Drive: 6 plays, 48 yards, 2:55; Louisiana 23–17)

Statistics	LA	TXST
First downs	20	26
Total yards	423	378
Rushing yards	171	177
Passing yards	252	201
Turnovers	0	2
Time of possession	30:52	29:08

Team	Category	Player	Statistics
Louisiana	Passing	Ben Wooldridge	18/28, 252 yards, TD
Louisiana	Rushing	Dre'lyn Washington	10 carries, 94 yards, TD
Louisiana	Receiving	Lance LeGendre	3 receptions, 76 yards
Texas State	Passing	RJ Martinez	11/14, 113 yards, INT
Texas State	Rushing	Ismail Mahdi	14 carries, 82 yards, TD
Texas State	Receiving	Kole Wilson	6 receptions, 57 yards

=== At Louisiana–Monroe ===
Texas State Bobcats at Louisiana–Monroe Warhawks – Game summary

Quarter	1	2	3	4	Total
Bobcats	14	14	0	10	38
Warhawks	0	0	14	3	17

at Malone Stadium, Monroe, Louisiana

- Date: November 9
- Game time: 11:00 a.m. CDT
- Game weather: Rain • Temperature: 68 °F (20 °C) • Wind: NE 4 miles per hour (6.4 km/h)
- Game attendance: 13,720
- Referee: Marshall Lewis
- TV announcers (ESPNU): Jason Ross Jr. (play-by-play) and Tyoka Jackson (analyst)
- Box score, Recap

Game information

First quarter

- (7:25) TXST – Deion Hankins 3-yard run, Mason Shipley kick (Drive: 9 plays, 76 yards, 3:57; Texas State 7–0)
- (1:55) TXST – Kole Wilson 41-yard pass from Jordan McCloud, Mason Shipley kick (Drive: 1 play, 41 yards, 0:08; Texas State 14–0)

Second quarter

- (12:04) TXST – Jordan McCloud 6-yard run, Mason Shipley kick (Drive: 6 plays, 33 yards, 2:56; Texas State 21–0)
- (0:12) TXST – Brad Jackson 2-yard run, Mason Shipley kick (Drive: 14 plays, 83 yards, 3:52; Texas State 28–0)

Third quarter

- (7:48) ULM – Ahmad Hardy 1-yard run, Max Larson kick (Drive: 13 plays, 75 yards, 7:12; Texas State 28–7)
- (2:38) ULM – Ahmad Hardy 1-yard run, Max Larson kick (Drive: 8 plays, 63 yards, 3:49; Texas State 28–14)

Fourth quarter

- (8:28) TXST – Mason Shipley 32-yard field goal (Drive: 6 plays, 18 yards, 3:27; Texas State 31–14)
- (6:02) ULM – Max Larson 31-yard field goal (Drive: 8 plays, 62 yards, 2:26; Texas State 31–17)
- (0:56) TXST – Brad Jackson 13-yard run, Mason Shipley kick (Drive: 10 plays, 75 yards, 5:05; Texas State 38–17)

Statistics	TXST	ULM
First downs	21	18
Total yards	398	278
Rushing yards	326	159
Passing yards	72	119
Turnovers	0	2
Time of possession	31:01	28:59

Team	Category	Player	Statistics
Texas State	Passing	Jordan McCloud	4/5, 56 yards, TD
Texas State	Rushing	Brad Jackson	16 carries, 119 yards, 2 TD
Texas State	Receiving	Kole Wilson	3 receptions, 53 yards, TD
Louisiana–Monroe	Passing	Aidan Armenta	13/24, 119 yards, INT
Louisiana–Monroe	Rushing	Ahmad Hardy	20 carries, 105 yards, 2 TD
Louisiana–Monroe	Receiving	Davon Wells	3 receptions, 37 yards

=== Southern Miss ===
Southern Miss Golden Eagles at Texas State Bobcats – Game summary

Quarter	1	2	3	4	Total
Golden Eagles	0	3	0	0	3
Bobcats	21	13	17	7	58

at UFCU Stadium, San Marcos, Texas

- Date: November 16
- Game time: 6:00 p.m. CDT
- Game weather: Sunny
- Game attendance: 22,618
- Referee: Ted Pitts
- TV announcers (ESPN+): Brant Freeman (play-by-play) and Bill Culhane (analyst)
- Box score, Recap

Game information

First Quarter

- (10:06) TXST – Ismail Mahdi 11-yard pass from Jordan McCloud, Mason Shipley kick (Drive: 12 plays, 87 yards, 4:49; Texas State 7–0)
- (5:35) TXST – Konner Fox 23-yard pass from Jordan McCloud, Mason Shipley kick (Drive: 7 plays, 88 yards, 2:08; Texas State 14–0)
- (2:12) TXST – Brad Jackson 10-yard run, Mason Shipley kick (Drive: 5 plays, 41 yards, 1:38; Texas State 21–0)

Second Quarter

- (10:22) USM – Connor Gibbs 46-yard field goal (Drive: 13 plays, 46 yards, 6:50; Texas State 21–3)
- (9:33) TXST – Jaden Williams 29-yard pass from Jordan McCloud (Drive: 4 plays, 70 yards, 0:49; Texas State 27–3)
- (0:34) TXST – Ismail Mahdi 15-yard pass from Jordan McCloud, Mason Shipley kick (Drive: 4 plays, 74 yards, 0:40; Texas State 34–3)

Third Quarter

- (12:05) TXST – Torrance Burgess Jr. 57-yard field goal, Mason Shipley kick (Drive: 4 plays, 69 yards, 1:36; Texas State 41–3)
- (3:18) TXST – Mason Shipley 40-yard field goal (Drive: 11 plays, 53 yards, 4:46; Texas State 44–3)
- (2:05) TXST – Drew Donley 60-yard pass from Brad Jackson, Mason Shipley kick (Drive: 1 play, 60 yards, 0:12; Texas State 51–3)

Fourth Quarter

- (7:56) TXST – Lincoln Pare 68-yard run, Beckham Sunderland kick (Drive: 4 plays, 89 yards, 1:45; Texas State 58–3)

Statistics	USM	TXST
First downs	14	33
Total yards	194	703
Rushing yards	124	266
Passing yards	70	437
Turnovers	1	1
Time of possession	34:43	25:17

Team	Category	Player	Statistics
Southern Miss	Passing	Tate Rodemaker	6/15, 63 yards, INT
Southern Miss	Rushing	Rodrigues Clark	15 carries, 66 yards
Southern Miss	Receiving	Kenyon Clay	5 receptions, 43 yards
Texas State	Passing	Jordan McCloud	23/28, 335 yards, 4 TD, INT
Texas State	Rushing	Lincoln Pare	2 carries, 74 yards, TD
Texas State	Receiving	Kole Wilson	6 receptions, 116 yards

=== Georgia State ===
Georgia State Panthers at Texas State Bobcats – Game summary

Quarter	1	2	3	4	Total
Panthers	14	24	7	7	52
Bobcats	14	7	0	23	44

at UFCU Stadium, San Marcos, Texas

- Date: November 23
- Game time: 6:00 p.m. CDT
- Game weather: Sunny
- Game attendance: 18,271
- Referee: Tim Barker
- TV announcers (ESPN+): Brant Freeman (play-by-play), Keith Moreland (analyst) and Koral Allemand (sideline)

Game information

First quarter

- (11:40) GAST – Michel Dukes 23-yard run, Liam Rickman kick (Drive: 6 plays, 66 yards, 2:06; Georgia State 7–0)
- (7:56) TXST – Torrance Burgess Jr. 18-yard run, Mason Shipley kick (Drive: 9 plays, 75 yards, 3:44; Tied 7–7)
- (5:49) TXST – Chris Dawn Jr. 10-yard pass from Jordan McCloud, Mason Shipley kick (Drive: 2 plays, 16 yards, 0:30; Texas State 14–7)
- (2:39) GAST – Freddie Brock 7-yard run, Liam Rickman kick (Drive: 8 plays, 75 yards, 3:10; Tied 14–14)

Second quarter

- (12:26) TXST – Chris Dawn Jr. 6-yard pass from Jordan McCloud, Mason Shipley kick (Drive: 11 plays, 75 yards, 5:13; Texas State 21–14)
- (8:40) GAST – Dorian Fleming 30-yard pass from Christian Veilleux, Liam Rickman kick (Drive: 8 plays, 75 yards, 3:46; Tied 21–21)
- (1:54) GAST – Dorian Fleming 21-yard pass from Christian Veilleux, Liam Rickman kick (Drive: 7 plays, 80 yards, 3:25; Georgia State 28–21)
- (1:14) GAST – Dorian Fleming 11-yard pass from Christian Veilleux, Liam Rickman kick (Drive: 3 plays, 8 yards, 0:15; Georgia State 35–21)
- (0:00) GAST – Braeden McAlister 52-yard field goal (Drive: 4 plays, 27 yards, 0:19; Georgia State 38–21)

Third quarter

- (1:21) GAST – Freddie Brock 57-yard run, Liam Rickman kick (Drive: 2 plays, 65 yards, 0:49; Georgia State 45–21)

Fourth quarter

- (12:25) TXST – Beau Sparks 80-yard punt return, Chris Dawn Jr. pass (Georgia State 45–29)
- (10:16) GAST – Freddie Brock 16-yard run, Liam Rickman kick (Drive: 4 plays, 61 yards, 2:07; Georgia State 52–29)
- (7:05) TXST – Chris Dawn Jr. 6-yard pass from Jordan McCloud, Mason Shipley kick (Drive: 10 plays, 75 yards, 3:11; Georgia State 52–36)
- (2:52) TXST – Lincoln Pare 3-yard run, Lincoln Pare pass (Drive: 6 plays, 14 yards, 1:05; Georgia State 52–44)

Statistics	GAST	TXST
First downs	27	26
Total yards	504	459
Rushing yards	219	157
Passing yards	285	302
Turnovers	0	4
Time of possession	31:30	28:30

Team	Category	Player	Statistics
Georgia State	Passing	Christian Veilleux	15/26, 285 yards, 3 TD
Georgia State	Rushing	Freddie Brock	18 carries, 133 yards, 3 TD
Georgia State	Receiving	Dorian Fleming	5 receptions, 88 yards, 3 TD
Texas State	Passing	Jordan McCloud	28/44, 302 yards, 3 TD, 2 INT
Texas State	Rushing	Ismail Mahdi	15 carries, 58 yards
Texas State	Receiving	Jaden Williams	7 receptions, 91 yards

=== At South Alabama ===
Texas State Bobcats at South Alabama Jaguars – Game summary

Quarter	1	2	3	4	Total
Bobcats	14	7	10	14	45
Jaguars	14	14	7	3	38

at Hancock Whitney Stadium, Mobile, Alabama

- Date: November 29
- Game time: 2:30 p.m. CDT
- Game weather: Sunny, 56 °F (13 °C)
- Game attendance: 15,569
- Referee: Trennis Livingston
- TV announcers (ESPN+): Pat Greenwood (play-by-play) and Brian Genard (analyst)
- Box score, Recap

Game information
First quarter
- TXST – Jordan McCloud 9-yard run (Mason Shipley kick), 11:53. Bobcats 7–0. Drive: 7 plays, 75 yards, 3:07.
- USA – Fluff Bothwell 51-yard run (Laith Marjan kick), 9:38. Tied 7–7. Drive: 5 plays, 75 yards, 2:15.
- USA – Blayne Myrick 33-yard interception return (Laith Marjan kick), 8:15. Jaguars 14–7.
- TXST – Brad Jackson 11-yard run (Mason Shipley kick), 4:39. Tied 14–14. Drive: 8 plays, 75 yards, 3:36.

Second quarter

- TXST – Ismail Mahdi 33-yard run (Mason Shipley kick), 8:59. Bobcats 21–14. Drive: 8 plays, 60 yards, 3:58.
- USA – Jamaal Pritchett 17-yard pass from Gio Lopez (Laith Marjan kick), 3:59. Tied 21–21. Drive: 10 plays, 75 yards, 5:00.
- USA – Gio Lopez 8-yard run (Laith Marjan kick), 2:06. Jaguars 28–21. Drive: 2 plays, 25 yards, 0:41.

Third quarter

- TXST – Lincoln Pare 1-yard run (Mason Shipley kick), 6:33. Tied 28–28. Drive: 12 plays, 66 yards, 5:33.
- TXST – Mason Shipley 32-yard field goal, 2:49. Bobcats 31–28. Drive: 6 plays, 14 yards, 2:25.
- USA – Fluff Bothwell 29-yard run (Laith Marjan kick), 1:44. Jaguars 35–31. Drive: 3 plays, 75 yards, 1:05.

Fourth quarter

- TXST – Joey Hobert 18-yard pass from Jordan McCloud (Mason Shipley kick), 11:39. Bobcats 38–35. Drive: 12 plays, 90 yards, 4:58.
- TXST – Mannie Nunnery 60-yard interception return (Mason Shipley kick), 7:27. Bobcats 45–35.
- USA – Laith Marjan 21-yard field goal, 1:34. Bobcats 45–38. Drive: 14 plays, 74 yards, 5:49.

Statistics	TXST	USA
First downs	28	19
Total yards	530	377
Rushing yards	282	147
Passing yards	248	230
Turnovers	2	3
Time of possession	35:25	24:35

Team	Category	Player	Statistics
Texas State	Passing	Jordan McCloud	21/28, 248 yards, TD, 2 INT
Texas State	Rushing	Ismail Mahdi	20 rushes, 147 yards, TD
Texas State	Receiving	Joey Hobert	7 receptions, 80 yards, TD
South Alabama	Passing	Gio Lopez	16/23, 190 yards, TD, 2 INT
South Alabama	Rushing	Fluff Bothwell	6 rushes, 81 yards, 2 TD
South Alabama	Receiving	Jamaal Pritchett	10 receptions, 85 yards, TD

=== North Texas (First Responder Bowl) ===
2025 Servpro First Responder Bowl
North Texas Mean Green at Texas State Bobcats – Game summary

Quarter	1	2	3	4	Total
Mean Green	7	7	0	14	28
Bobcats	6	10	7	7	30

at Gerald J. Ford Stadium • University Park, Texas

- Date: Friday, January 3, 2025
- Game time: 3:00 p.m.
- Game weather: Sunny • Temperature: 62 °F (17 °C) • Wind: E at 5 miles per hour (8.0 km/h)
- Game attendance: 28,725
- Referee: Greg Sujack
- TV announcers (ESPN): Tom Hart (play-by-play), Jordan Rodgers (analyst), and Cole Cubelic (sideline)

Game information

First quarter

- TXST– Mason Shipley 34-yard field goal, 8:58. TXST 3–0. Drive: 11 plays, 58 yards, 4:19.
- UNT– Miles Coleman 46-yard pass from Drew Mestemaker, (Kali Nguma kick), 6:33. UNT 7–3. Drive: 7 plays, 75 yards, 2:25.
- TXST– Mason Shipley 21-yard field goal, 2:45. UNT 7–6. Drive: 7 plays, 71 yards, 3:48.

Second quarter

- UNT– Landon Sides 16-yard pass from Drew Mestemaker, (Kali Nguma kick), 14:54. UNT 14–6. Drive: 8 plays, 59 yards, 2:51.
- TXST– Mason Shipley 49-yard field goal, 11:02. UNT 14–9. Drive: 9 plays, 35 yards, 3:52.
- TXST– Jaden Williams 24-yard pass from Jordan McCloud, (Mason Shipley kick), 3:27. TXST 16–14. Drive: 10 plays, 68 yards, 4:33.

Third quarter

- TXST– Lincoln Pare 1-yard run, (Mason Shipley kick), 8:04. TXST 23–14. Drive: 13 plays, 75 yards, 6:56.

Fourth quarter

- UNT– Makenzie Gill 1-yard run, (Kali Nguma kick), 3:20. TXST 23–21. Drive: 3 plays, 58 yards, 1:36.
- TXST– Lincoln Pare 73-yard run, (Mason Shipley kick), 2:25. TXST 30–21. Drive: 2 plays, 75 yards, 0:55.
- UNT– Drew Mestemaker 70-yard run, (Kali Nguma kick), 1:49. TXST 30–28. Drive: 3 plays, 72 yards, 0:36.

Statistics	UNT	TXST
First downs	22	26
Total yards	491	508
Rushing yards	98	201
Passing yards	393	307
Passing: Comp–Att–Int	26–41–2	26–35–1
Time of possession	22:13	37:47

Team	Category	Player	Statistics
North Texas	Passing	Drew Mestemaker	26/41, 393 yards, 2 TD, 2 INT
North Texas	Rushing	Drew Mestemaker	9 carries, 55 yards, TD
North Texas	Receiving	Damon Ward Jr.	5 receptions, 133 yards
Texas State	Passing	Jordan McCloud	26/35, 307 yards, TD, INT
Texas State	Rushing	Lincoln Pare	21 carries, 143 yards, 2 TD
Texas State	Receiving	Jaden Williams	8 receptions, 155 yards, TD
