= 2024 North Texas Mean Green football team =

American college football season

2024 North Texas Mean Green football
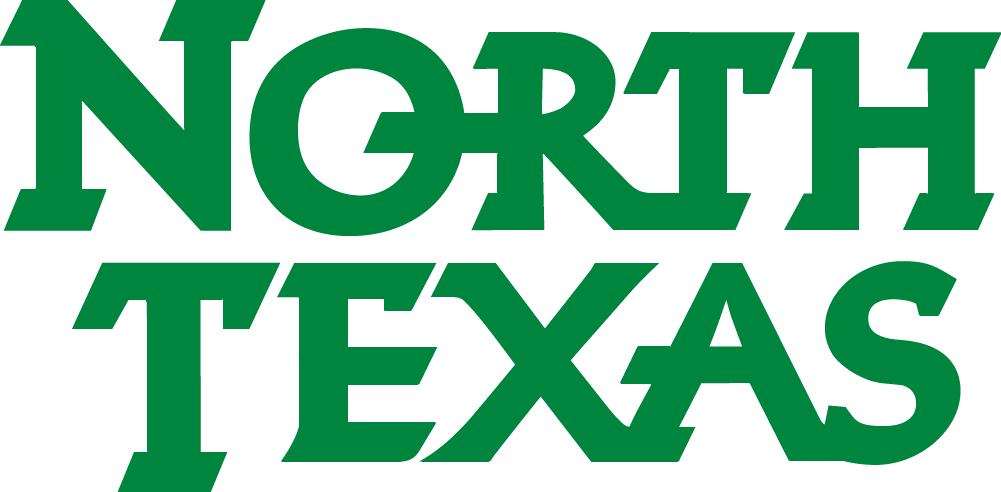

First Responder Bowl, L 28–30 vs. Texas State
- Conference: American Athletic Conference
- Record: 6–7 (3–5 AAC)
- Head coach: Eric Morris (2nd season)
- Offensive coordinator: Jordan Davis (2nd season)
- Offensive scheme: Air raid
- Defensive coordinator: Matt Caponi (2nd season; first 10 games); Brian Odom (interim; remainder of season)
- Base defense: 3–3–5
- Home stadium: DATCU Stadium

2024 American Athletic Conference football standings
	Conf.			Overall
Team	W		L	W		L
No. 21 Army y$	8	–	0	12	–	2
Tulane y	7	–	1	9	–	5
Navy	6	–	2	10	–	3
No. 24 Memphis	6	–	2	11	–	2
East Carolina	5	–	3	8	–	5
South Florida	4	–	4	7	–	6
UTSA	4	–	4	7	–	6
Charlotte	4	–	4	5	–	7
North Texas	3	–	5	6	–	7
Rice	3	–	5	4	–	8
Temple	2	–	6	3	–	9
UAB	2	–	6	3	–	9
Florida Atlantic	1	–	7	3	–	9
Tulsa	1	–	7	3	–	9
Championship: Army 35, Tulane 14
$ – Conference champion; y – Championship game participant; Rankings from AP Poll

The 2024 North Texas Mean Green football team represented the University of North Texas as a member of American Athletic Conference (AAC) during the 2024 NCAA Division I FBS football season. Led by second-year head coach Eric Morris, the Mean Green compiled an overall record of 6–7 with a mark of 3–5 in conference play, tying for ninth place in the AAC. North Texas was invited to the First Responder Bowl, where the Mean Green lost to Texas State. The team played home games at DATCU Stadium in Denton, Texas.

== Schedule ==
Date	Time	Opponent	Site	TV	Result	Attendance
August 31	4:00 p.m.	at South Alabama*	Hancock Whitney Stadium; Mobile, AL	ESPN+	W 52–38	15,559
September 7	6:30 p.m.	Stephen F. Austin*	DATCU Stadium; Denton, TX	ESPN+	W 35–20	23,510
September 14	11:00 a.m.	at Texas Tech*	Jones AT&T Stadium; Lubbock, TX	FS1	L 21–66	57,865
September 21	6:00 p.m.	Wyoming*	DATCU Stadium; Denton, TX	ESPN+	W 44–17	27,049
September 28	6:00 p.m.	Tulsa	DATCU Stadium; Denton, TX	ESPN+	W 52–20	18,529
October 12	6:00 p.m.	at Florida Atlantic	FAU Stadium; Boca Raton, FL	ESPN2	W 41–37	14,576
October 19	6:30 p.m.	at Memphis	Simmons Bank Liberty Stadium; Memphis, TN	ESPNU	L 44–52	24,110
October 26	11:00 a.m.	Tulane^{†}	DATCU Stadium; Denton, TX	ESPN2	L 37–45	23,138
November 9	2:30 p.m.	No. 25 Army	DATCU Stadium; Denton, TX	ESPN2	L 3–14	28,519
November 15	7:00 p.m.	at UTSA	Alamodome; San Antonio, TX	ESPN2	L 27–48	21,350
November 23	2:30 p.m.	East Carolina	DATCU Stadium; Denton, TX	ESPN+	L 28–40	17,387
November 30	11:00 a.m.	at Temple	Lincoln Financial Field; Philadelphia, PA	ESPN+	W 24–17	11,589
January 3, 2025	3:00 p.m.	vs. Texas State*	Gerald J. Ford Stadium; University Park, TX (First Responder Bowl)	ESPN	L 28–30	28,725
*Non-conference game; ^{†}Homecoming; Rankings from AP Poll (and CFP Rankings, after November 5) - Released prior to game; All times are in Central time

== Preseason ==
=== AAC media poll ===
The American Athletic Conference released its media prediction poll on July 23, 2024. The Mean Green were predicted to finish ninth in the conference.

== Game summaries ==
=== at South Alabama ===
North Texas Mean Green (0–0) at South Alabama Jaguars (0–0) – Game summary

Quarter	1	2	3	4	Total
Mean Green	7	7	28	10	52
Jaguars	3	16	7	12	38

at Hancock Whitney Stadium • Mobile, Alabama

- Date: August 31
- Game time: 4:00 p.m. CDT
- Game weather: Cloudy • Temperature: 86 °F (30 °C) • Wind: SE at 6 miles per hour (9.7 km/h)
- Game attendance: 15,559
- Referee: Edwin Lee
- TV announcers (ESPN+): Pat Greenwood (play-by-play) and Brian Genard (analyst)

Game information

First quarter

- (9:37) UNT – Chandler Morris 2 yard run, Kali Nguma kick (Drive: 15 plays, 79 yards, 5:18; North Texas 7–0)
- (5:58) USA – Laith Marjan 39 yard field goal (Drive: 8 plays, 57 yards, 3:34; North Texas 7–3)

Second quarter

- (14:55) USA – Gio Lopez 8 yard run, Laith Marjan kick (Drive: 7 plays, 72 yards, 2:13; South Alabama 10–7)
- (12:43) UNT – Damon Ward Jr. 3 yard pass from Chandler Morris, Kali Nguma kick (Drive: 7 plays, 79 yards, 2:06; North Texas 14–10)
- (9:39) USA – Laith Marjan 32 yard field goal (Drive: 8 plays, 61 yards, 3:04; North Texas 14–13)
- (4:24) USA – Fluff Bothwell 13 yard run, 2-point pass failed (Drive: 12 plays, 83 yards, 3:55; South Alabama 19–14)

Third quarter

- (13:23) UNT – Blair Conwright 25 yard pass from Chandler Morris, Kali Nguma kick (Drive: 3 plays, 66 yards, 0:47; North Texas 21–19)
- (10:14) UNT – Chandler Morris 1 yard run, Kali Nguma kick (Drive: 5 plays, 50 yards, 2:16; North Texas 28–19)
- (5:15) USA – Jamaal Pritchett 26 yard pass from Gio Lopez, Laith Marjan kick (Drive: 9 plays, 75 yards, 4:59; North Texas 28–26)
- (3:36) UNT – Damon Ward Jr. 54 yard pass from Chandler Morris, Kali Nguma kick (Drive: 4 plays, 69 yards, 1:35; North Texas 35–26)
- (2:40) UNT – CJ Garnett 0 yard punt return, Kali Nguma kick (North Texas 42–26)

Fourth quarter

- (13:31) USA – Shamar Sandgren 21 yard pass from Gio Lopez, 2-point pass failed (Drive: 9 plays, 75 yards, 4:09; North Texas 42–32)
- (8:28) UNT – Ikaika Ragsdale 3 yard run, Kali Nguma kick (Drive: 10 plays, 76 yards, 4:57; North Texas 49–32)
- (4:39) USA – Anthony Eager 23 yard pass from Gio Lopez, 2-point pass failed (Drive: 10 plays, 75 yards, 3:49; North Texas 49–38)
- (2:53) UNT – Kali Nguma 30 yard field goal (Drive: 7 plays, 28 yards, 1:46; North Texas 52–38)

Statistics	UNT	USA
First downs	28	29
Plays–yards	76–550	82–582
Rushes–yards	34–104	33–150
Passing yards	446	432
Passing: Comp–Att–Int	33–42–0	26–49–0
Time of possession	29:32	30:28

Team	Category	Player	Statistics
North Texas	Passing	Chandler Morris	32/41, 415 yards, 3 TD
North Texas	Rushing	Ikaika Ragsdale	14 carries, 45 yards, 1 TD
North Texas	Receiving	Damon Ward Jr.	12 receptions, 230 yards, 2 TD
South Alabama	Passing	Gio Lopez	26/49, 432 yards, 3 TD
South Alabama	Rushing	Gio Lopez	13 carries, 62 yards, 1 TD
South Alabama	Receiving	Jamaal Pritchett	10 receptions, 197 yards, 1 TD

=== Stephen F. Austin ===
Stephen F. Austin Lumberjacks (FCS) (1–0) at North Texas Mean Green (1–0) – Game summary

Quarter	1	2	3	4	Total
Lumberjacks (FCS)	10	7	3	0	20
Mean Green	14	7	7	7	35

at DATCU Stadium • Denton, Texas

- Date: September 7
- Game time: 6:30 p.m. CDT
- Game weather: Sunny • Temperature: 83 °F (28 °C) • Wind: W at 12 miles per hour (19 km/h)
- Game attendance: 23,510
- Referee: Reid Jackson
- TV announcers (ESPN+): Peter Sousa (play-by-play), Doc Holliday (analyst)

Game information

First quarter

- (11:26) SFA – Chris Campos 40 yard field goal (Drive: 4 plays, -12 yards, 2:00; Stephen F. Austin 3–0)
- (9:51) UNT – DT Sheffield 51 yard pass from Chandler Morris, Kali Nguma kick (Drive: 5 plays, 75 yards, 1:35; North Texas 7–3)
- (5:27) UNT – DT Sheffield 2 yard pass from Chandler Morris, Kali Nguma kick (Drive: 10 plays, 81 yards, 3:23; North Texas 14–3)
- (2:08) SFA – Jermaine Brown 70 yard interception return, Chris Campos kick (North Texas 14–10)

Second quarter

- (9:50) SFA – Isaiah Davis 33 yard pass from Sam Vidlak, Chris Campos kick (Drive: 6 plays, 62 yards, 2:10; Stephen F. Austin 17–14)
- (0:15) UNT – DT Sheffield 28 yard pass from Chandler Morris, Kali Nguma kick (Drive: 4 plays, 44 yards, 1:34; North Texas 21–17)

Third quarter

- (8:57) UNT – Oscar Hammond 7 yard pass from Chandler Morris, Kali Nguma kick (Drive: 10 plays, 74 yards, 4:04; North Texas 28–17)
- (6:47) SFA – Chris Campos 21 yard field goal (Drive: 5 plays, 31 yards, 1:11; North Texas 28–20)

Fourth quarter

- (14:16) UNT – Damashja Harris 80 yard run, Kali Nguma kick (Drive: 3 plays, 90 yards, 1:06; North Texas 35–20)

Statistics	SFA	UNT
First downs	14	25
Plays–yards	70–248	77–504
Rushes–yards	31–67	33–182
Passing yards	181	322
Passing: Comp–Att–Int	20–39–1	26–44–3
Time of possession	26:08	33:52

Team	Category	Player	Statistics
Stephen F. Austin	Passing	Sam Vidlak	20/39, 181 yards, 1 TD, 1 INT
Stephen F. Austin	Rushing	Jaylen Jenkins	12 carries, 44 yards
Stephen F. Austin	Receiving	Kylon Harris	9 receptions, 74 yards
North Texas	Passing	Chandler Morris	26/44, 322 yards, 4 TD, 3 INT
North Texas	Rushing	Damashja Harris	10 carries, 142 yards, 1 TD
North Texas	Receiving	DT Sheffield	6 receptions, 74 yards, 3 TD

=== at Texas Tech ===
North Texas Mean Green (2–0) at Texas Tech Red Raiders (1–1) – Game summary

Quarter	1	2	3	4	Total
Mean Green	7	0	7	7	21
Red Raiders	17	35	7	7	66

at Jones AT&T Stadium • Lubbock, Texas

- Date: September 14
- Game time: 11:00 a.m. CDT
- Game weather: Sunny • Temperature: 82 °F (28 °C) • Wind: SW at 14 miles per hour (23 km/h)
- Game attendance: 57,865
- Referee: Tutashinda Salaam
- TV announcers (FS1): Dan Hellie (play-by-play), Petros Papadakis (analyst)

Game information
First quarter
- (10:17) TTU – Josh Kelly 10 yard pass from Behren Morton, Gino Garcia kick (Drive: 8 plays, 56 yards, 3:04; Texas Tech 7–0)
- (5:12) TTU – Gino Garcia 25 yard field goal (Drive: 8 plays, 65 yards, 3:55; Texas Tech 10–0)
- (5:05) UNT – Wyatt Young 75 yard pass from Chandler Morris, Kali Nguma kick (Drive: 1 play, 75 yards, 0:07; Texas Tech 10–7)
- (0:52) TTU – Tahj Brooks 21 yard run, Reese Burkhardt kick (Drive: 9 plays, 75 yards, 4:13; Texas Tech 17–7)

Second quarter

- (10:22) TTU – Coy Eakin 70 yard pass from Behren Morton, Gino Garcia kick (Drive: 2 plays, 80 yards, 0:40; Texas Tech 24–7)
- (9:50) TTU – Bralyn Lux 44 yard interception return, Reese Burkhardt kick (Texas Tech 31–7)
- (9:30) TTU – Behren Morton 10 yard run, Gino Garcia kick (Drive: 1 play, 25 yards, 0:13; Texas Tech 38–7)
- (6:05) TTU – Johncarlos Miller II 45 yard pass from Behren Morton, Reese Burkhardt kick (Drive: 4 plays, 75 yards, 1:41; Texas Tech 45–7)
- (3:08) TTU – Jalin Conyers 10 yard pass from Behren Morton, Gino Garcia kick (Drive: 6 plays, 30 yards, 2:47; Texas Tech 52–7)

Third quarter

- (9:09) UNT – Jeremiah Aaron 15 yard pass from Chandler Morris, Kali Nguma kick (Drive: 4 plays, 18 yards, 0:58; Texas Tech 52–14)
- (4:06) TTU – J'Koby Williams 3 yard run, Reese Burkhardt kick (Drive: 4 plays, 43 yards, 1:27; Texas Tech 59–14)

Fourth quarter

- (12:50) TTU – Cameron Dickey 1 yard run, Gino Garcia kick (Drive: 9 plays, 79 yards, 4:35; Texas Tech 66–14)
- (9:19) UNT – Shane Porter 1 yard run, Kali Nguma kick (Drive: 8 plays, 75 yards, 3:31; Texas Tech 66–21)

Statistics	UNT	TTU
First downs	13	25
Plays–yards	64–353	71–586
Rushes–yards	34–135	37–232
Passing yards	218	354
Passing: Comp–Att–Int	17–30–3	24–34–1
Time of possession	27:29	32:31

Team	Category	Player	Statistics
North Texas	Passing	Chandler Morris	15/27, 162 yards, 2 TD, 3 INT
North Texas	Rushing	Shane Porter	7 carries, 31 yards, 1 TD
North Texas	Receiving	Miles Coleman	3 receptions, 75 yards
Texas Tech	Passing	Behren Morton	15/19, 273 yards, 4 TD
Texas Tech	Rushing	Tahj Brooks	17 carries, 109 yards, 1 TD
Texas Tech	Receiving	Coy Eakin	1 reception, 70 yards, 1 TD

=== Wyoming ===
Wyoming Cowboys (0–3) at North Texas Mean Green (2–1) – Game summary

Quarter	1	2	3	4	Total
Cowboys	3	14	0	0	17
Mean Green	7	20	14	3	44

at DATCU Stadium • Denton, Texas

- Date: September 21
- Game time: 6:00 p.m. CDT
- Game weather: Sunny, 94 °F (34 °C)
- Game attendance: 27,049
- Referee: Charles Lamertina
- TV announcers (ESPN+): James Westling (play-by-play) and Leger Douzable (analyst)

Game information

First quarter

- (9:54) WYO – John Hoyland 30 yard field goal (Drive: 11 plays, 62 yards, 5:06; WYO 3–0)
- (7:18) UNT – DT Sheffield 29 yard pass from Chandler Morris, Kali Nguma kick (Drive: 7 plays, 75 yards, 2:36; UNT 7–3)

Second quarter

- (14:12) UNT – Kali Nguma 23 yard field goal (Drive: 14 plays, 80 yards, 4:47; UNT 10–3)
- (5:54) UNT – Blair Conwright 19 yard pass from Chandler Morris, Kali Nguma kick (Drive: 8 plays, 75 yards, 4:09; UNT 17–3)
- (2:15) WYO – Sam Scott 41 yard pass from Evan Svoboda, John Hoyland kick (Drive: 8 plays, 75 yards, 3:39; UNT 17–10)
- (1:17) UNT – Makenzie McGill 4 yard run, Kali Nguma kick (Drive: 7 plays, 76 yards, 0:53; UNT 24–10)
- (1:03) WYO – Tyler King 100 yard kickoff return, John Hoyland kick (UNT 24–17)
- (0:00) UNT – Kali Nguma 45 yard field goal (Drive: 8 plays, 48 yards, 1:03; UNT 27–17)

Third quarter

- (10:10) UNT – Makenzie McGill 2 yard run, Kali Nguma kick (Drive: 6 plays, 35 yards, 2:07; UNT 34–17)
- (5:17) UNT – Makenzie McGill 24 yard run, Kali Nguma kick (Drive: 7 plays, 92 yards, 3:55; UNT 41–17)

Fourth quarter

- (2:07) UNT – Kali Nguma 34 yard field goal (Drive: 7 plays, 20 yards, 5:01; UNT 44–17)

Statistics	WYO	UNT
First downs	15	28
Plays–yards	60–244	75–534
Rushes–yards	32–69	32–216
Passing yards	175	318
Passing: Comp–Att–Int	15–28–0	30–43–0
Time of possession	28:13	31:47

Team	Category	Player	Statistics
Wyoming	Passing	Evan Svoboda	11/23, 155 yards, 1 TD
Wyoming	Rushing	Sam Scott	11 carries, 39 yards
Wyoming	Receiving	John Michael Gyllenborg	5 receptions, 56 yards
North Texas	Passing	Chandler Morris	28/41, 305 yards, 2 TD
North Texas	Rushing	Shane Porter	13 carries, 120 yards
North Texas	Receiving	DT Sheffield	8 receptions, 109 yards, 1 TD

=== Tulsa ===
Tulsa Golden Hurricane (2–2) at North Texas Mean Green (3–1) – Game summary

Quarter	1	2	3	4	Total
Golden Hurricane	0	3	0	17	20
Mean Green	0	24	21	7	52

at DATCU Stadium • Denton, Texas

- Date: September 28
- Game time: 6:30 p.m. CDT
- Game weather: Sunny • Temperature: 87 °F (31 °C) • Wind: S at 15 miles per hour (24 km/h)
- Game attendance: 18,529
- Referee: Steven Anderson
- TV announcers (ESPN+): James Westling (play-by-play), Leger Douzable (analyst) and Smacker Miles (sideline)

Game information

First quarter

No scoring plays

Second quarter

- (14:12) TLS – Seth Morgan 22-yard field goal (Drive: 11 plays, 58 yards, 3:51; Tulsa 3–0)
- (4:47) UNT – Blair Conwright 96-yard pass from Chandler Morris, Kali Nguma kick (Drive: 11 plays, 58 yards, 3:51; North Texas 7–3)
- (1:56) UNT – Kali Nguma 27-yard field goal (Drive: 6 plays, 40 yards, 2:00; North Texas 10–3)
- (1:28) UNT – Wyatt Young 1-yard run, Kali Nguma kick (Drive: 1 play, 1 yard, 0:05; North Texas 17–3)
- (0:06) UNT – Wyatt Young 26-yard pass from Chandler Morris, Kali Nguma kick (Drive: 2 plays, 41 yards, 0:15; North Texas 24–3)

Third quarter

- (12:05) UNT – DT Sheffield 27-yard pass from Chandler Morris, Kali Nguma kick (Drive: 8 plays, 64 yards, 2:49; North Texas 31–3)
- (8:31) UNT – Dalton Carnes 14-yard pass from Chandler Morris, Kali Nguma kick (Drive: 4 plays, 80 yards, 1:32; North Texas 38–3)
- (1:32) UNT – Kiefer Sibley 9-yard pass from Chandler Morris, Kali Nguma kick (Drive: 11 plays, 99 yards, 4:58; North Texas 45–3)

Fourth quarter

- (12:47) TLS – Seth Morgan 45-yard field goal (Drive: 11 plays, 48 yards, 3:45; North Texas 45–6)
- (12:35) UNT – Makenzie McGill II 75-yard run, Kali Nguma kick (Drive: 1 play, 75 yards, 0:12; North Texas 52–6)
- (7:29) TLS – Jack Wright 18-yard pass from Cooper Legas, Seth Morgan kick (Drive: 9 plays, 82 yards, 4:57; North Texas 52–13)
- (0:06) TLS – Connor Vaughn 5-yard pass from Tim Carpenter, Troop O'Neal kick (Drive: 12 plays, 71 yards, 3:31; North Texas 52–20)

Statistics	TLSA	UNT
First downs	27	21
Plays–yards	91–415	60–618
Rushes–yards	47–229	26–179
Passing yards	186	439
Passing: Comp–Att–Int	20–44–2	22–34–0
Time of possession	36:35	23:25

Team	Category	Player	Statistics
Tulsa	Passing	Kirk Francis	13/29, 101 yards, 2 INT
Tulsa	Rushing	Bill Jackson	16 carries, 77 yards
Tulsa	Receiving	Kamdyn Benjamin	7 receptions, 68 yards
North Texas	Passing	Chandler Morris	22/34, 439 yards, 5 TD
North Texas	Rushing	Makenzie McGill II	5 carries, 70 yards, TD
North Texas	Receiving	Blair Conwright	2 receptions, 115 yards, TD

=== at Florida Atlantic ===
North Texas Mean Green (4–1) at Florida Atlantic Owls (2–3) – Game summary

Quarter	1	2	3	4	Total
Mean Green	14	3	10	14	41
Owls	7	20	7	3	37

at FAU Stadium • Boca Raton, Florida

- Date: October 12
- Game time: 6:00 p.m. CDT
- Game weather: Rain • Temperature: 82 °F (28 °C) • Wind: NE at 5 miles per hour (8.0 km/h)
- Game attendance: 14,576
- Referee: Kevin Randall
- TV announcers (ESPN2): Dave Neal (play-by-play), Aaron Murray (analyst) and Ashley ShahAhmadi (sideline)

Game information

First quarter

- (10:29) UNT – Dalton Carnes 19-yard pass from Chandler Morris, Kali Nguma kick (Drive: 14 plays, 75 yards, 4:31; North Texas 7–0)
- (6:38) FAU – Omari Hayes 14-yard pass from Cam Fancher, Morgan Suarez kick (Drive: 7 plays, 75 yards, 3:51; Tied 7–7)
- (5:11) UNT – Nick Rempert 25-yard pass from Chandler Morris, Kali Nguma kick (Drive: 1 play, 25 yards, 0:08; North Texas 14–7)

Second quarter

- (14:19) FAU – Morgan Suarez 26-yard field goal (Drive: 11 plays, 71 yards, 5:45; North Texas 14–10)
- (7:34) FAU – Wyatt Sullivan 28-yard pass from Cam Fancher, Morgan Suarez kick (Drive: 10 plays, 73 yards, 5:28; Florida Atlantic 17–14)
- (4:40) UNT – Kali Nguma 46-yard field goal (Drive: 6 plays, 47 yards, 2:54; Tied 17–17)
- (1:20) FAU – Jabari Smith Jr. 5-yard pass from Cam Fancher, Morgan Suarez kick (Drive: 9 plays, 75 yards, 3:13; Florida Atlantic 24–17)
- (0:02) FAU – Morgan Suarez 32-yard field goal (Drive: 5 plays, 38 yards, 0:28; Florida Atlantic 27–17)

Third quarter

- (9:21) UNT – Makenzie McGill II 3-yard run, Kali Nguma kick (Drive: 7 plays, 65 yards, 2:40; Florida Atlantic 27–24)
- (5:06) FAU – CJ Campbell Jr. 12-yard run, Morgan Suarez kick (Drive: 1 play, 12 yards, 0:07; Florida Atlantic 34–24)
- (0:25) UNT – Kali Nguma 40-yard field goal (Drive: 10 plays, 58 yards, 4:34; Florida Atlantic 34–27)

Fourth quarter

- (4:21) FAU – Morgan Suarez 32-yard field goal (Drive: 7 plays, 18 yards, 3:41; Florida Atlantic 37–27)
- (2:38) UNT – DT Sheffield 8-yard pass from Chandler Morris, Kali Nguma kick (Drive: 8 plays, 75 yards, 1:43; Florida Atlantic 37–34)
- (0:58) UNT – DT Sheffield 3-yard pass from Chandler Morris, Kali Nguma kick (Drive: 5 plays, 58 yards, 0:45; North Texas 41–37)

Statistics	UNT	FAU
First downs	26	26
Plays–yards	71–484	74–519
Rushes–yards	26–148	43–168
Passing yards	336	351
Passing: Comp–Att–Int	27–45–1	22–31–1
Time of possession	23:50	36:10

Team	Category	Player	Statistics
North Texas	Passing	Chandler Morris	27/45, 336 yards, 4 TD, INT
North Texas	Rushing	Shane Porter	9 carries, 70 yards
North Texas	Receiving	DT Sheffield	11 receptions, 126 yards, 2 TD
Florida Atlantic	Passing	Cam Fancher	22/30, 351 yards, 3 TD, INT
Florida Atlantic	Rushing	CJ Campbell Jr.	18 carries, 89 yards, TD
Florida Atlantic	Receiving	Omari Hayes	5 receptions, 89 yards, TD

=== at Memphis ===
North Texas Mean Green (5–1) at Memphis Tigers (5–1) – Game summary

Quarter	1	2	3	4	Total
Mean Green	21	3	7	13	44
Tigers	14	14	7	17	52

at Simmons Bank Liberty Stadium • Memphis, Tennessee

- Date: October 19
- Game time: 6:30 p.m. CDT
- Game weather: Clear • Temperature: 69 °F (21 °C) • Wind: E 5 miles per hour (8.0 km/h)
- Game attendance: 24,110
- Referee: Tim Rich
- TV announcers (ESPNU): Noah Reed (play-by-play) and Craig Haubert (analyst)

Game information

First quarter

- (11:05) MEM – Seth Henigan 4-yard run, Caden Costa kick (Drive: 9 plays, 75 yards, 3:55; Memphis 7–0)
- (10:54) UNT – DT Sheffield 75-yard run, Kali Nguma kick (Drive: 1 play, 75 yards, 0:11; Tied 7–7)
- (7:05) MEM – Mario Anderson Jr. 5-yard run, Caden Costa kick (Drive: 7 plays, 75 yards, 3:49; Memphis 14–7)
- (6:55) UNT – DT Sheffield 75-yard pass from Chandler Morris, Kali Nguma kick (Drive: 1 play, 75 yards, 0:10; Tied 14–14)
- (2:46) UNT – Shane Porter 10-yard run, Kali Nguma kick (Drive: 6 plays, 71 yards, 2:36; North Texas 21–14)

Second quarter

- (13:07) MEM – Brandon Thomas 1-yard run, Caden Costa kick (Drive: 10 plays, 79 yards, 4:34; Tied 21–21)
- (7:41) MEM – Mario Anderson Jr. 42-yard run, Tristian Vandenberg kick (Drive: 1 play, 42 yards, 0:08; Memphis 28–21)
- (0:00) UNT – Kali Nguma 34-yard field goal (Drive: 9 plays, 62 yards, 1:02; Memphis 28–24)

Third quarter

- (2:32) UNT – DT Sheffield 9-yard pass from Chandler Morris, Kali Nguma kick (Drive: 11 plays, 65 yards, 4:29; North Texas 31–28)
- (0:33) MEM – DeMeer Blankumsee 62-yard pass from Seth Henigan, Tristian Vandenberg kick (Drive: 4 plays, 75 yards, 1:59; Memphis 35–31)

Fourth quarter

- (13:59) UNT – Chandler Morris 49-yard run, Kali Nguma kick (Drive: 6 plays, 75 yards, 1:34; North Texas 38–35)
- (9:23) MEM – Mario Anderson Jr. 4-yard run, Tristian Vandenberg kick (Drive: 8 plays, 65 yards, 4:36; Memphis 42–38)
- (5:17) MEM – Mario Anderson Jr. 5-yard run, Tristian Vandenberg kick (Drive: 5 plays, 70 yards, 2:47; Memphis 49–38)
- (2:48) UNT – Blair Conwright 9-yard pass from Chandler Morris (Drive: 10 plays, 75 yards, 2:29; Memphis 49–44)
- (1:05) MEM – Tristian Vandenberg 43-yard field goal (Drive: 6 plays, 19 yards, 1:43; Memphis 52–44)

Statistics	UNT	MEM
First downs	32	21
Plays–yards	97–653	70–526
Rushes–yards	33–208	32–207
Passing yards	445	319
Passing: Comp–Att–Int	36–64–1	24–38–0
Time of possession	27:50	32:10

Team	Category	Player	Statistics
North Texas	Passing	Chandler Morris	36/61, 445 yards, 3 TD, INT
North Texas	Rushing	Chandler Morris	10 carries, 71 yards, TD
North Texas	Receiving	DT Sheffield	8 receptions, 122 yards, 2 TD
Memphis	Passing	Seth Henigan	24/38, 319 yards, TD
Memphis	Rushing	Mario Anderson Jr.	22 carries, 183 yards, 4 TD
Memphis	Receiving	DeMeer Blankumsee	6 receptions, 96 yards, TD

=== Tulane ===
Tulane Green Wave (5–2) at North Texas Mean Green (5–2) – Game summary

Quarter	1	2	3	4	Total
Green Wave	21	10	14	0	45
Mean Green	3	14	7	13	37

at DATCU Stadium • Denton, Texas

- Date: October 26
- Game time: 11:00 a.m. CDT
- Game weather: Sunny • Temperature: 72 °F (22 °C) • Wind: S 10 miles per hour (16 km/h)
- Game attendance: 23,138
- Referee: Kevin Randall
- TV announcers (ESPN2): Brian Custer (play-by-play), Rod Gilmore (analyst) and Lauren Sisler (sideline)

Game information

First quarter

- (7:50) TULN – Mario Williams 9-yard pass from Darian Mensah, Jacob Barnes kick (Drive: 7 plays, 44 yards, 3:46; Tulane 7–0)
- (4:12) UNT – Kali Nguma 43-yard field goal (Drive: 9 plays, 60 yards, 3:33; Tulane 7–3)
- (2:07) TULN – Yulkeith Brown 30-yard pass from Darian Mensah, Jacob Barnes kick (Drive: 4 plays, 75 yards, 2:05; Tulane 14–3)
- (1:16) TULN – Ty Thompson 17-yard run, Jacob Barnes kick (Drive: 2 plays, 28 yards, 0:44; Tulane 21–3)

Second quarter

- (10:01) UNT – Damon Ward Jr. 26-yard pass from Chandler Morris, Kali Nguma kick (Drive: 5 plays, 57 yards, 2:08; Tulane 21–10)
- (5:50) TULN – Makhi Hughes 2-yard run, Jacob Barnes kick (Drive: 7 plays, 68 yards, 4:11; Tulane 28–10)
- (1:22) UNT – DT Sheffield 30-yard pass from Chandler Morris, Kali Nguma kick (Drive: 4 plays, 47 yards, 0:43; Tulane 28–17)
- (0:28) TULN – Jacob Barnes 47-yard field goal (Drive: 6 plays, 43 yards, 0:53; Tulane 31–17)

Third quarter

- (8:06) TULN – Alex Bauman 14-yard pass from Darian Mensah (Drive: 7 plays, 72 yards, 3:44; Tulane 37–17)
- (5:55) UNT – Chandler Morris 20-yard run, Kali Nguma kick (Drive: 7 plays, 75 yards, 2:11; Tulane 37–24)
- (3:02) TULN – Yulkeith Brown 11-yard run, Yukeith Brown pass (Drive: 1 play, 11 yards, 0:05; Tulane 45–24)

Fourth quarter

- (4:23) UNT – Makenzie McGill II 2-yard run (Drive: 19 plays, 80 yards, 7:20; Tulane 45–30)
- (0:41) UNT – Damon Ward Jr. 10-yard pass from Chandler Morris, Kali Nguma kick (Drive: 11 plays, 90 yards, 1:47; Tulane 45–37)

Statistics	TULN	UNT
First downs	21	28
Plays–yards	60–472	82–525
Rushes–yards	47–297	25–76
Passing yards	175	449
Passing: Comp–Att–Int	10–13–1	38–57–0
Time of possession	30:59	29:01

Team	Category	Player	Statistics
Tulane	Passing	Darian Mensah	10/13, 175 yards, 3 TD, INT
Tulane	Rushing	Makhi Hughes	30 carries, 195 yards, TD
Tulane	Receiving	Dontae Fleming	3 receptions, 92 yards
North Texas	Passing	Chandler Morris	38/57, 449 yards, 3 TD
North Texas	Rushing	Chandler Morris	6 carries, 20 yards, TD
North Texas	Receiving	DT Sheffield	9 receptions, 125 yards, TD

=== No. 25 Army ===
No. 25 Army Black Knights (8–0) at North Texas Mean Green (5–3) – Game summary

Quarter	1	2	3	4	Total
No. 25 Black Knights	7	0	0	7	14
Mean Green	3	0	0	0	3

at DATCU Stadium • Denton, Texas

- Date: November 9
- Game time: 2:30 p.m. CST
- Game weather: Sunny • Temperature: 70 °F (21 °C) • Wind: W 4 miles per hour (6.4 km/h)
- Game attendance: 28,519
- Referee: Edwin Lee
- TV announcers (ESPN2): Mike Monaco (play-by-play), Kirk Morrison (analyst), and Dawn Davenport (sideline reporter)

Game information

First quarter

- (8:10) UNT – Kali Nguma 31-yard field goal (Drive: 18 plays, 62 yards, 6:50; North Texas 3–0)
- (2:22) ARMY – Bryson Daily 10-yard run, Trey Gronotte kick (Drive: 9 plays, 48 yards, 5:47; Army 7–3)

Second quarter

No scoring plays

Third quarter

No scoring plays

Fourth quarter

- (11:44) ARMY – Bryson Daily 2-yard run, Trey Gronotte kick (Drive: 21 plays, 94 yards, 13:46; Army 14–3)

Statistics	ARMY	UNT
First downs	23	18
Plays–yards	68–308	55–283
Rushes–yards	64–293	18–69
Passing yards	15	214
Passing: Comp–Att–Int	2–4–1	24–37–2
Time of possession	41:37	18:15

Team	Category	Player	Statistics
Army	Passing	Bryson Daily	2/4, 15 yards, INT
Army	Rushing	Bryson Daily	36 carries, 153 yards, 2 TD
Army	Receiving	Josh Horton	1 reception, 8 yards
North Texas	Passing	Chandler Morris	24/37, 214 yards, 2 INT
North Texas	Rushing	Shane Porter	6 carries, 33 yards
North Texas	Receiving	Damon Ward Jr.	4 receptions, 63 yards

=== at UTSA ===
North Texas Mean Green (5–4) at UTSA Roadrunners (4–5) – Game summary

Quarter	1	2	3	4	Total
Mean Green	0	7	13	7	27
Roadrunners	14	13	3	18	48

at Alamodome • San Antonio, Texas

- Date: November 15
- Game time: 7:00 p.m. CST
- Game weather: None (played indoors)
- Game attendance: 21,350
- Referee: Kevin Randall
- TV announcers (ESPN2): Anish Shroff (play-by-play), Andre Ware (analyst) and Paul Carcaterra (sideline)

Game information

First quarter

- (6:38) UTSA – Kevorian Barnes 1-yard run, Tate Sandell kick (Drive: 8 plays, 49 yards, 3:05; UTSA 7–0)
- (3:41) UTSA – David Amador II 51-yard pass from Owen McCown, Tate Sandell kick (Drive: 2 plays, 59 yards, 0:41; UTSA 14–0)

Second quarter

- (14:42) UNT – Shane Porter 79-yard run, Kali Nguma kick (Drive: 1 play, 79 yards, 0:13; UTSA 14–7)
- (8:43) UTSA – Dan Dishman 7-yard pass from Owen McCown, Tate Sandell kick (Drive: 14 plays, 75 yards, 5:59; UTSA 21–7)
- (4:20) UTSA – Tate Sandell 42-yard field goal (Drive: 6 plays, 51 yards, 2:25; UTSA 24–7)
- (0:00) UTSA – Tate Sandell 44-yard field goal (Drive: 11 plays, 58 yards, 1:26; UTSA 27–7)

Third quarter

- (7:29) UNT – Shane Porter 39-yard run, Kali Nguma kick (Drive: 10 plays, 86 yards, 3:14; UTSA 27–14)
- (1:55) UTSA – Tate Sandell 28-yard field goal (Drive: 12 plays, 70 yards, 5:34; UTSA 30–14)
- (1:28) UNT – Shane Porter 43-yard run (Drive: 2 plays, 75 yards, 0:27; UTSA 30–20)

Fourth quarter

- (14:04) UTSA – Tate Sandell 34-yard field goal (Drive: 6 plays, 58 yards, 2:24; UTSA 33–20)
- (12:27) UNT – Blair Conwright 14-yard pass from Chandler Morris, Kali Nguma kick (Drive: 4 plays, 75 yards, 1:37; UTSA 33–27)
- (9:15) UTSA – Robert Henry 2-yard run, Patrick Overmyer pass (Drive: 6 plays, 82 yards, 2:42; UTSA 41–27)
- (2:33) UTSA – Robert Henry 83-yard run, Tate Sandell kick (Drive: 1 play, 83 yards, 0:12; UTSA 48–27)

Statistics	UNT	UTSA
First downs	20	30
Plays–yards	61–480	91–681
Rushes–yards	25–239	48–302
Passing yards	241	379
Passing: Comp–Att–Int	21–36–2	29–43–1
Time of possession	20:44	39:16

Team	Category	Player	Statistics
North Texas	Passing	Chandler Morris	21/36, 241 yards, TD, 2 INT
North Texas	Rushing	Shane Porter	13 carries, 193 yards, 3 TD
North Texas	Receiving	Damon Ward Jr.	4 receptions, 85 yards
UTSA	Passing	Owen McCown	29/43, 379 yards, 2 TD, INT
UTSA	Rushing	Robert Henry	20 carries, 168 yards, 2 TD
UTSA	Receiving	David Amador II	9 receptions, 122 yards, TD

=== East Carolina ===
East Carolina Pirates (6–4) at North Texas Mean Green (5–5) – Game summary

Quarter	1	2	3	4	Total
Pirates	0	7	24	9	40
Mean Green	14	7	7	0	28

at DATCU Stadium • Denton, Texas

- Date: November 23
- Game time: 2:30 p.m. CST
- Game weather: Sunny • Temperature: 72 °F (22 °C) • Wind: S 11 miles per hour (18 km/h)
- Game attendance: 17,387
- Referee: Charles Lamertina
- TV announcers (ESPN+): Ted Emrich (play-by-play), LaDarrin McLane (analyst) and Smacker Miles (sideline)

Game information

First quarter

- (8:31) UNT – Blair Conwright 4-yard pass from Chandler Morris, Kali Nguma kick (Drive: 4 plays, 37 yards, 1:45; North Texas 7–0)
- (5:54) UNT – Miles Coleman 7-yard pass from Chandler Morris, Kali Nguma kick (Drive: 9 plays, 49 yards, 2:14; North Texas 14–0)

Second quarter

- (3:06) UNT – Blair Conwright 3-yard pass from Chandler Morris, Kali Nguma kick (Drive: 14 plays, 83 yards, 6:59; North Texas 21–0)
- (0:04) ECU – Rahjai Harris 1-yard run, Andrew Conrad kick (Drive: 14 plays, 67 yards, 3:01; North Texas 21–7)

Third quarter

- (13:06) ECU – Rahjai Harris 39-yard run, Andrew Conrad kick (Drive: 2 plays, 46 yards, 0:31; North Texas 21–14)
- (8:19) ECU – Andrew Conrad 38-yard field goal (Drive: 9 plays, 25 yards, 3:11; North Texas 21–17)
- (6:08) ECU – Anthony Smith 50-yard pass from Katin Houser, Andrew Conrad kick (Drive: 4 plays, 80 yards, 1:16; East Carolina 24–21)
- (1:43) ECU – Yannick Smith 28-yard pass from Katin Houser, Andrew Conrad kick (Drive: 8 plays, 65 yards, 2:41; East Carolina 31–21)
- (0:04) UNT – Makenzie McGill II 7-yard run, Kali Nguma kick (Drive: 4 plays, 75 yards, 1:39; East Carolina 31–28)

Fourth quarter

- (10:36) ECU – Andrew Conrad 31-yard field goal (Drive: 12 plays, 63 yards, 4:28; East Carolina 34–28)
- (1:38) ECU – Rahjai Harris 7-yard run (Drive: 3 plays, 30 yards, 0:23; East Carolina 40–28)

Statistics	ECU	UNT
First downs	26	30
Plays–yards	81–553	84–447
Rushes–yards	57–255	36–181
Passing yards	298	266
Passing: Comp–Att–Int	16–24–1	32–48–0
Time of possession	28:33	31:27

Team	Category	Player	Statistics
East Carolina	Passing	Katin Houser	16/23, 298 yards, 2 TD, INT
East Carolina	Rushing	Rahjai Harris	24 carries, 128 yards, 3 TD
East Carolina	Receiving	Anthony Smith	4 receptions, 121 yards, TD
North Texas	Passing	Chandler Morris	32/48, 266 yards, 3 TD
North Texas	Rushing	Shane Porter	17 carries, 74 yards
North Texas	Receiving	Damon Ward Jr.	5 receptions, 68 yards

=== at Temple ===
North Texas Mean Green (5–6) at Temple Owls (3–8) – Game summary

Quarter	1	2	3	4	Total
Mean Green	17	7	0	0	24
Owls	3	14	0	0	17

at Lincoln Financial Field • Philadelphia, Pennsylvania

- Date: November 30
- Game time: 11:00 a.m. CST
- Game weather: Sunny • Temperature: 37 °F (3 °C) • Wind: W at 15 miles per hour (24 km/h)
- Game attendance: 11,589
- Referee: Reid Jackson
- TV announcers (ESPN+): Joe Tordy (play-by-play), Leger Douzable (analyst) and Maria Trivelpiece (sideline)

Game information

First quarter

- (12:19) UNT – DT Sheffield 14-yard pass from Chandler Morris, Kali Nguma kick (Drive: 8 plays, 75 yards, 2:41; UNT 7–0)
- (12:00) UNT – Kali Nguma 36-yard field goal (Drive: 4 plays, 0 yards, 0:11; UNT 10–0)
- (4:55) TEM – Maddux Trujillo 44-yard field goal (Drive: 5 plays, 27 yards, 2:13; UNT 10–3)
- (3:02) UNT – Makenzie McGill II 39-yard run, Kali Nguma kick (Drive: 7 plays, 75 yards, 1:53; UNT 17–3)

Second quarter

- (14:52) UNT – Makenzie McGill II 51-yard run, Kali Nguma kick (Drive: 3 plays, 60 yards, 1:22; UNT 24–3)
- (4:04) TEM – Joquez Smith 1-yard run, Maddux Trujillo kick (Drive: 3 plays, 58 yards, 0:52; UNT 24–10)
- (0:46) TEM – Evan Simon 1-yard run, Maddux Trujillo kick (Drive: 7 plays, 72 yards, 1:43; UNT 24–17)

Third quarter

No scoring plays

Fourth quarter

No scoring plays

Statistics	UNT	TEM
First downs	18	16
Plays–yards	78–433	73–345
Rushes–yards	38–253	29–77
Passing yards	180	268
Passing: Comp–Att–Int	21–40–0	27–44–1
Time of possession	28:46	31:14

Team	Category	Player	Statistics
North Texas	Passing	Chandler Morris	21/40, 180 yards, TD
North Texas	Rushing	Makenzie McGill II	14 carries, 155 yards, 2 TD
North Texas	Receiving	DT Sheffield	4 receptions, 47 yards, TD
Temple	Passing	Evan Simon	27/44, 268 yards, INT
Temple	Rushing	Joquez Smith	8 carries, 39 yards, TD
Temple	Receiving	John Adams	4 receptions, 63 yards

=== Texas State—First Responder Bowl ===
2025 Servpro First Responder Bowl
North Texas Mean Green (6–6) vs Texas State Bobcats (7–5) – Game summary

Quarter	1	2	3	4	Total
Mean Green	7	7	0	14	28
Bobcats	6	10	7	7	30

at Gerald J. Ford Stadium • University Park, Texas

- Date: Friday, January 3, 2025
- Game time: 3:00 p.m.
- Game weather: Sunny • Temperature: 62 °F (17 °C) • Wind: E at 5 miles per hour (8.0 km/h)
- Game attendance: 28,725
- Referee: Greg Sujack
- TV announcers (ESPN): Tom Hart (play-by-play), Jordan Rodgers (analyst), and Cole Cubelic (sideline)

Game information

First quarter

- TXST– Mason Shipley 34-yard field goal, 8:58. TXST 3–0. Drive: 11 plays, 58 yards, 4:19.
- UNT– Miles Coleman 46-yard pass from Drew Mestemaker, (Kali Nguma kick), 6:33. UNT 7–3. Drive: 7 plays, 75 yards, 2:25.
- TXST– Mason Shipley 21-yard field goal, 2:45. UNT 7–6. Drive: 7 plays, 71 yards, 3:48.

Second quarter

- UNT– Landon Sides 16-yard pass from Drew Mestemaker, (Kali Nguma kick), 14:54. UNT 14–6. Drive: 8 plays, 59 yards, 2:51.
- TXST– Mason Shipley 49-yard field goal, 11:02. UNT 14–9. Drive: 9 plays, 35 yards, 3:52.
- TXST– Jaden Williams 24-yard pass from Jordan McCloud, (Mason Shipley kick), 3:27. TXST 16–14. Drive: 10 plays, 68 yards, 4:33.

Third quarter

- TXST– Lincoln Pare 1-yard run, (Mason Shipley kick), 8:04. TXST 23–14. Drive: 13 plays, 75 yards, 6:56.

Fourth quarter

- UNT– Makenzie Gill 1-yard run, (Kali Nguma kick), 3:20. TXST 23–21. Drive: 3 plays, 58 yards, 1:36.
- TXST– Lincoln Pare 73-yard run, (Mason Shipley kick), 2:25. TXST 30–21. Drive: 2 plays, 75 yards, 0:55.
- UNT– Drew Mestemaker 70-yard run, (Kali Nguma kick), 1:49. TXST 30–28. Drive: 3 plays, 72 yards, 0:36.

Statistics	UNT	TXST
First downs	22	26
Total yards	491	508
Rushing yards	98	201
Passing yards	393	307
Passing: Comp–Att–Int	26–41–2	26–35–1
Time of possession	22:13	37:47

Team	Category	Player	Statistics
North Texas	Passing	Drew Mestemaker	26/41, 393 yards, 2 TD, 2 INT
North Texas	Rushing	Drew Mestemaker	9 carries, 55 yards, TD
North Texas	Receiving	Damon Ward Jr.	5 receptions, 133 yards
Texas State	Passing	Jordan McCloud	26/35, 307 yards, TD, INT
Texas State	Rushing	Lincoln Pare	21 carries, 143 yards, 2 TD
Texas State	Receiving	Jaden Williams	8 receptions, 155 yards, TD
