= Paring =

Paring may refer to:

- Paring Abbey, a Benedictine monastery
- Paring knife, a small knife with a plain edge blade

== See also ==
- Pare (disambiguation)
- Pares (disambiguation)
