= Pares =

Pares may refer to:

== People ==
- Pares (surname)
- John Pares Craine (before 1959 – 1977), Episcopalian bishop of Indianapolis

== Other uses ==
- Pares, Antigua and Barbuda, a village
- Pares (food), a dish originating in the Philippines
- Pares (butterfly), a genus of butterflies in the subtribe Moncina
- Portal de Archivos Españoles (PARES), a Spanish government archive service

== See also ==
- Doce Pares, a martial art
- "No pares", a 2006 song by Mexican band RBD
- Primus inter pares, a Latin phrase meaning "first among equals"
- Parés, a surname
- Parès, a surname
- Sala Parés, an art gallery in Barcelona, Spain
- Pare (disambiguation)
