= Parès =

Parès is a surname, and may refer to:

- Michel Parès (1887–1966), French politician
- Philippe Parès (1901–1979), French composer

== See also ==
- Pares (surname)
- Parés
