= List of UTSA Roadrunners football seasons =

This is a list of seasons completed by the UTSA Roadrunners college football program, the Roadrunners represent The University of Texas at San Antonio (UTSA) in the American Conference. UTSA plays its home games at the Alamodome in San Antonio, Texas.

== Seasons ==
Year	Coach	Overall	Conference	Standing	Bowl/playoffs	Coaches^{#}	AP^{°}
NCAA Division I FCS Independent (2011)
2011	Larry Coker	4–6					
Western Athletic Conference (2012)
2012	Larry Coker	8–4	3–3	4th	Ineligible-FBS transition		
Conference USA (2013–2022)
2013	Larry Coker	7–5	6–2	T–2nd (West)	Ineligible-FBS transition		
2014	Larry Coker	4–8	3–5	4th (West)			
2015	Larry Coker	3–9	3–5	T–3rd (West)			
2016	Frank Wilson	6–7	5–3	2nd (West)	L New Mexico Bowl		
2017	Frank Wilson	6–5	3–5	5th (West)			
2018	Frank Wilson	3–9	2–6	5th (West)			
2019	Frank Wilson	4–8	3–5	5th (West)			
2020	Jeff Traylor	7–5	5–2	2nd (West)	L First Responder Bowl		
2021	Jeff Traylor	12–2	7–1	1st (West)	L Frisco Bowl		
2022	Jeff Traylor	11–3	8–0	1st	L Cure Bowl		
CUSA:		63–61	45–34				
American Athletic Conference / American Conference (2023–present)
2023	Jeff Traylor	9–4	7–1	3rd	W Frisco Bowl		
2024	Jeff Traylor	7–6	4–4	T–6th	W Myrtle Beach Bowl		
2025	Jeff Traylor	7–6	4–4	T–6th	W First Responder Bowl		
American:		23–16	15–9				
Total:		98–87					
National championship Conference title Conference division title or championship game berth
