= Paré =

Paré is a family name of French origin. Some of the people who bear this name are:

- Ambroise Paré (c. 1510–1590), French surgeon
- Élise Paré-Tousignant (1937–2018), Canadian music administrator and pedagogue
- Emmett Paré (1907–1973), American tennis player
- François Paré (born 1949), Quebecois author and academic
- Jean Paré (1927–2022), Canadian cookbook author
- Jean Paré (journalist) (born 1935), Canadian journalist
- Jean-Guy Paré (born 1947), Canadian politician
- Jessica Paré (born 1980), Canadian actress
- Mark Paré (born 1957), Canadian NHL official
- Michael Paré (born 1958), American actor
- Pargui Emile Paré, Burkinabé politician
- Philippe Paré (born 1935), Canadian educator and politician
- Sammy Paré, Marvel Comics character

== See also ==
- Parè, municipality in the Province of Como
- Pare (disambiguation)
