= Rivesaltes =

- Commune
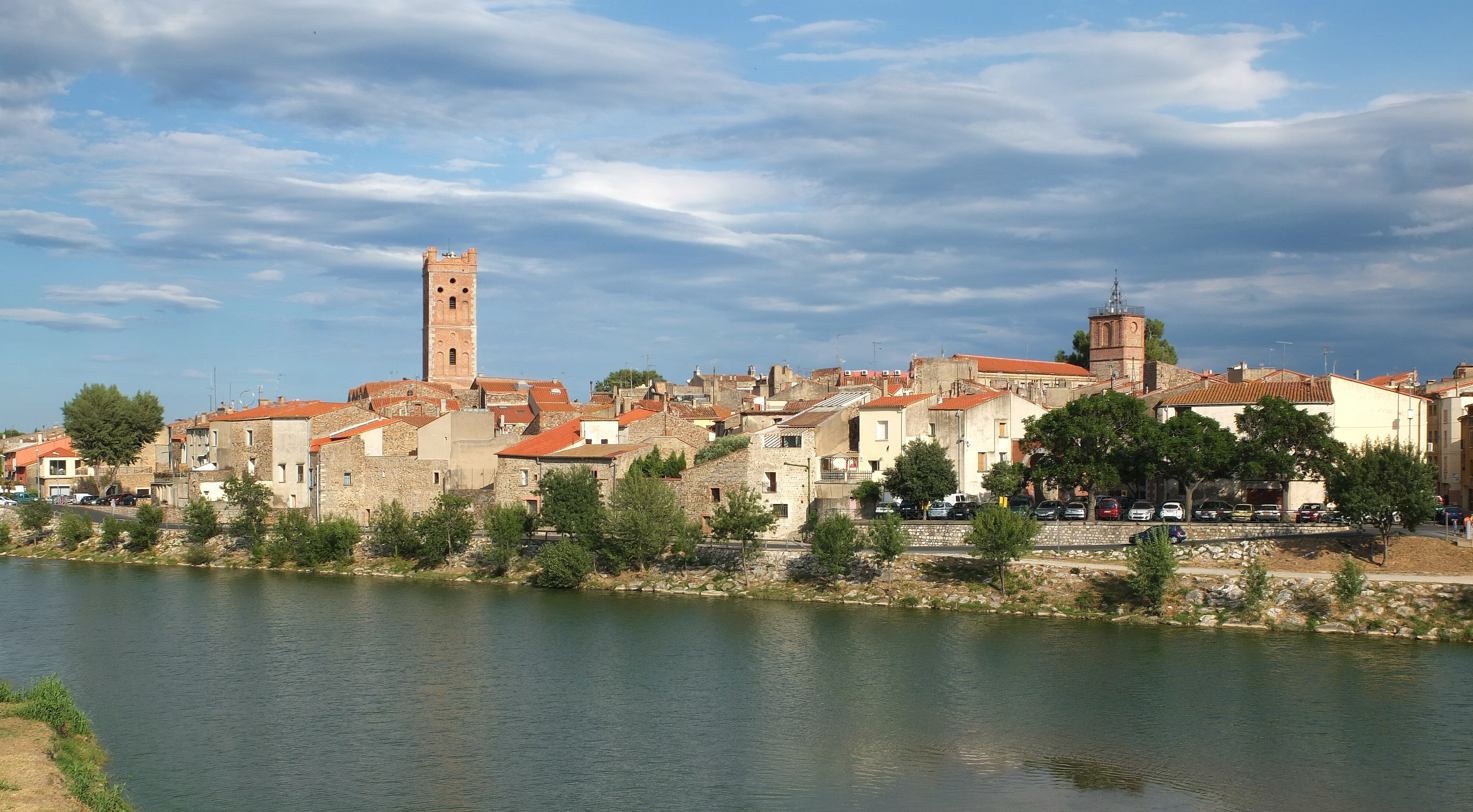
- General view of Rivesaltes

- Coat of arms
- Location of Rivesaltes
- Location within France Location within Occitanie
- Coordinates: 42°46′11″N 2°52′29″E
- Country: France
- Region: Occitania
- Department: Pyrénées-Orientales
- Arrondissement: Perpignan
- Canton: La Vallée de l'Agly
- Intercommunality: Perpignan Méditerranée Métropole

Government
  - Mayor (2020–2026): André Bascou (DVD)
- Area^{1}: 28.76 km^{2} (11.10 sq mi)
- Elevation: 29 m (95 ft)
- Highest elevation: 70 m (230 ft)
- Lowest elevation: 11 m (36 ft)
- Population (2023): 9,270
  - Density: 322/km^{2} (835/sq mi)
- Time zone: UTC+01:00 (CET)
  - Summer (DST): UTC+02:00 (CEST)
- INSEE/Postal code: 66164 /66600
- ^{1} French Land Register data, which excludes lakes, ponds, glaciers > 1 km^{2} (0.386 sq mi or 247 acres) and river estuaries.

Rivesaltes (French pronunciation: [ʁivzalt]; Catalan: Ribesaltes, which means the high shores) is a commune in the Pyrénées-Orientales department in southern France.

== Geography ==
Rivesaltes is in the canton of La Vallée de l'Agly and in the arrondissement of Perpignan.

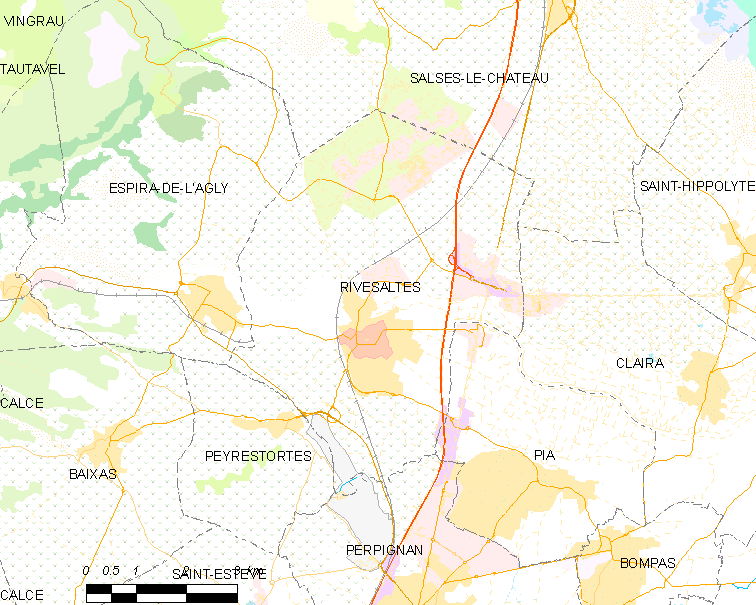
Map of Rivesaltes and its surrounding communes

== Politics and administration ==
=== Twin towns ===
Rivesaltes is twinned with:

- - Calgary, Canada
- - Chennai, India
- - Rangoon, Myanmar
- - Yaren, Nauru
- - Ramallah, Palestine
- - Port of Spain, Trinidad and Tobago
- - Chipping Norton, United Kingdom
- - Clitheroe, United Kingdom
- - Whalley, United Kingdom
- - Wilpshire, United Kingdom

== Population ==
Historical population
Year	Pop.	±% p.a.
1968	6,442	—
1975	6,589	+0.32%
1982	6,781	+0.41%
1990	7,110	+0.59%
1999	7,940	+1.23%
2007	8,625	+1.04%
2012	8,201	−1.00%
2017	8,610	+0.98%
2023	9,270	+1.24%
Source: INSEE

== Economy ==
Fortified wine is produced around Rivesaltes, as Rivesaltes AOC.

== Sites of interest ==
- The Camp de Rivesaltes is situated on the outskirts of the city. The Rivesaltes memorial museum is now fully open and commemorates the history of this major French concentration camp from 1939 to 2007.

== Notable people ==
- Joseph Joffre (1852–1931), general, born in Rivesaltes, who became prominent in the battles of World War I
- Michel Parès (1887–1966), politician, born in Rivesaltes

== See also ==
- Perpignan–Rivesaltes Airport
- Communes of the Pyrénées-Orientales department
