= 2025 First Responder Bowl (January) =

Postseason college football bowl game

2025 Servpro First Responder Bowl
- 15th First Responder Bowl
North Texas Mean Green	Texas State Bobcats
(6–6)	(7–5)
The American	Sun Belt
28	30
Head coach: Eric Morris	Head coach: G. J. Kinne
	1	2	3	4	Total
North Texas	7	7	0	14	28
Texas State	6	10	7	7	30
- Date: January 3, 2025
- Season: 2024
- Stadium: Gerald J. Ford Stadium
- Location: University Park, Texas
- MVP: Lincoln Pare (RB, Texas State)
- Referee: Greg Sujack (MAC)
- Attendance: 28,725

United States TV coverage
- Network: ESPN
- Announcers: Tom Hart (play-by-play), Jordan Rodgers (analyst), and Cole Cubelic (sideline)

International TV coverage
- Network: ESPN Deportes

The 2025 First Responder Bowl was a college football bowl game played on January 3, 2025, at Gerald J. Ford Stadium in University Park, Texas. The 15th annual First Responder Bowl featured North Texas and Texas State. The game began at approximately 3:00 p.m. CST and aired on ESPN. It was one of the 2024–25 bowl games concluding the 2024 FBS football season. Sponsored by cleanup and restoration company Servpro, the game was known as the Servpro First Responder Bowl.

== Teams ==
Consistent with conference tie-ins, the game featured teams from the Group of Five conferences. North Texas and Texas State had previously met 39 times, dating back to 1915 and most recently in 1994, with North Texas holding the advantage in the series, 29–7–3.

=== North Texas ===
North Texas completed their regular season with an overall record of 6–6 (3–5 in conference play). After starting with five wins in their first six games, the Mean Green finished with five losses in six games. North Texas faced one ranked team, losing to Army.

=== Texas State ===
Texas State had an overall record of 7–5 in regular-season play (5–3 in conference). The Bobcats had a 4–4 record after eight games, then won three of their final four games. Texas State did not face any ranked opponents.

== Game summary ==
2025 Servpro First Responder Bowl

Quarter	1	2	3	4	Total
North Texas	7	7	0	14	28
Texas State	6	10	7	7	30

at Gerald J. Ford Stadium • Dallas, Texas

- Date: Friday, January 3, 2025
- Game time: 3:05 p.m. CST
- Game weather: Sunny
- Game attendance: 28,725
- Referee: Greg Sujack
- TV announcers (ESPN): Tom Hart (play-by-play), Jordan Rodgers (analyst), and Cole Cubelic (sideline)
- Box score

Game information

First Quarter

- (8:58) TXST – Mason Shipley 34 yard field goal (Drive: 11 plays, 58 yards, 4:19; Texas State 3–0)
- (6:33) UNT – Miles Coleman 46 yard pass from Drew Mestemaker, Kali Nguma kick (Drive: 7 plays, 75 yards, 2:25; North Texas 7–3)
- (2:45) TXST – Mason Shipley 21 yard field goal (Drive: 7 plays, 71 yards, 3:48; North Texas 7–6)

Second Quarter

- (14:54) UNT – Landon Sides 16 yard pass from Drew Mestemaker, Kali Nguma kick (Drive: 8 plays, 59 yards, 2:51; North Texas 14–6)
- (11:02) TXST – Mason Shipley 47 yard field goal (Drive: 9 plays, 35 yards, 3:52; North Texas 14–9)
- (3:27) TXST – Jaden Williams 24 yard pass from Jordan McCloud, Mason Shipley kick (Drive: 10 plays, 68 yards, 4:33; Texas State 16–14)

Third Quarter

- (8:04) TXST – Lincoln Pare 1 yard run, Mason Shipley kick (Drive: 13 plays, 75 yards, 6:56; Texas State 23–14)

Fourth Quarter

- (3:20) UNT – Makenzie McGill II 1 yard run, Kali Nguma kick (Drive: 3 plays, 58 yards, 1:36; Texas State 23–21)
- (2:25) TXST – Lincoln Pare 73 yard run, Mason Shipley kick (Drive: 2 plays, 75 yards, 0:55; Texas State 30–21)
- (1:49) UNT – Drew Mestemaker 70 yard run, Kali Nguma kick (Drive: 3 plays, 72 yards, 0:36 Texas State 30–28)

=== Statistics ===
Statistics	UNT	TXST
First downs	22	26
Plays–yards	66–491	79–508
Rushes–yards	25–98	44–201
Passing yards	393	307
Passing: comp–att–int	26–41–2	26–35–1
Turnovers		
Time of possession	22:13	37:47

Team	Category	Player	Statistics
North Texas	Passing	Drew Mestemaker	26/41, 393 yards, 2 TD, 2 INT
North Texas	Rushing	Drew Mestemaker	9 carries, 55 yards, 1 TD
North Texas	Receiving	Damon Ward Jr.	5 receptions, 133 yards
Texas State	Passing	Jordan McCloud	26/35, 307 yards, 1 TD, 1 INT
Texas State	Rushing	Lincoln Pare	21 carries, 143 yards, 2 TD
Texas State	Receiving	Jaden Williams	8 receptions, 155 yards, 1 TD
