= Paresh Doshi =

Indian neurosurgeon

Paresh Doshi M.S., M.Ch.
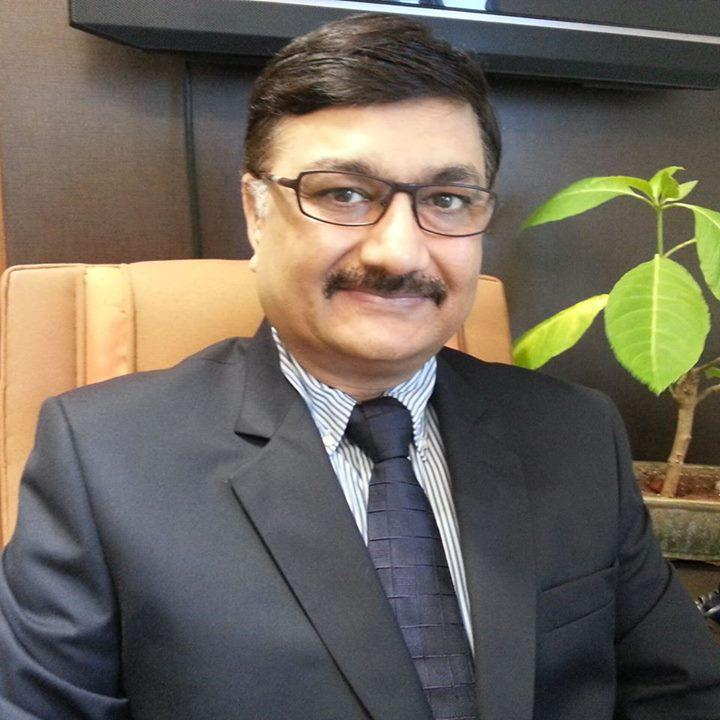
- Dr. Paresh Doshi at Jaslok Hospital, Mumbai
- Website: http://neurologicalsurgery.in/

Paresh Kishorchandra Doshi M.S., M.Ch. (born 1963) is a neurosurgeon who practices stereotactic and functional neurological surgery in India.

He is working as the Director of Neurosurgery, at the Jaslok hospital and research centre, Mumbai, India

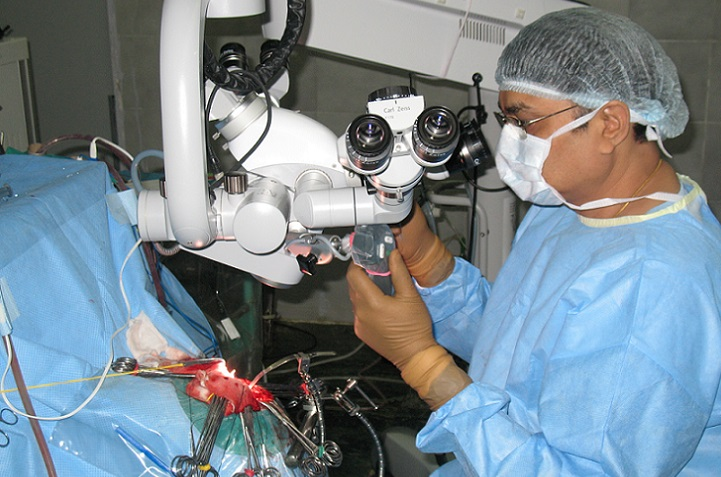
Doshi performing an epilepsy surgery at Jaslok Hospital, Mumbai.
