= Pare =

Pare may refer to:

== People with the name ==
- Pare, former member of Kotak, an Indonesian band
- Pare Lorentz (1905-1992), American film director
- Lincoln Pare (born 2001), American football player
- Richard Pare (born 1948), English photographer
- Paré, a surname (includes a list)

== Places ==
- Goregaon or formerly Pare, now a suburb of Mumbai, India
- Parè, a municipality in the Province of Como, Italy
- Pare, Kediri, a town in East Java, Indonesia
- Pare Mountains, a mountain range in northeastern Tanzania

== Other uses ==
- PARE (aviation), a spin recovery technique in aviation
- Pare (fort), a type of ruins on Rapa Iti
- Pare language, a Bantu language closely related to Taveta
- Pare (music), a concept in the European folk music traditions of Albania
- Pare people, members of an ethnic group indigenous to the Pare Mountains of northern Tanzania
- Pare (song), by Ghali and Madame
- Pare, a lintel above the door of a Māori wharenui
- Pare, a colloquial name for Auckland Prison

== See also ==
- Pare-Pare, a city in South Sulawesi, Indonesia
- Parre, a municipality in the Province of Bergamo in the Italian region of Lombardy
- Pere (disambiguation)
- Pair (disambiguation)
- Para (disambiguation)
- Pari (disambiguation)
- Paro (disambiguation)
- Pore (disambiguation)
- Pure (disambiguation)
