= Michel Parès =

French politician (1887–1966)

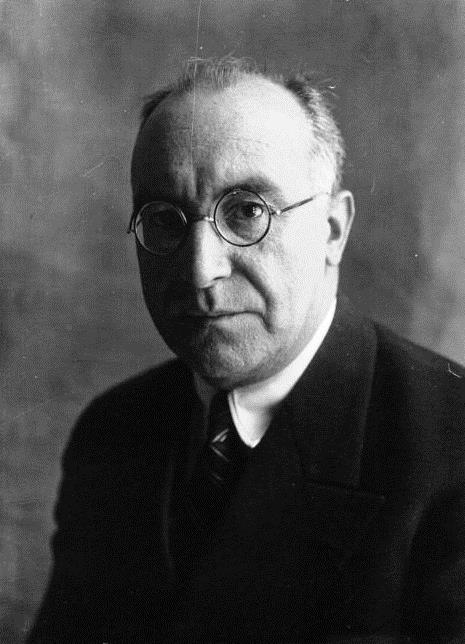
Michel Parès in 1932

Michel Parès (2 August 1887 – 3 November 1966) was a French politician.

Parès was born in Rivesaltes. He represented the Republican Federation in the Chamber of Deputies from 1931 to 1936.
