= Pars (surname) =

Pars is a surname. Notable people with the surname include:

- Leopold Pars (1896 – 1985), mathematician
- Asım Pars (1976 - 2024), Bosnian-Turkish basketball player
- Heino Pars (1925–2014), Estonian animated film director
- Kenan Pars (1920–2008), Turkish-Armenian actor
- Krisztián Pars (born 1982), Hungarian athlete
- William Pars (1742–1782), English painter
