= Paresh Dandona =

American physician

Paresh Dandona is an American physician, currently a SUNY Distinguished Professor at University at Buffalo.
