= Pares (surname) =

Pares is a surname, and may refer to:

- Bernard Pares (1867–1949), British historian and diplomat
- Bip Pares (1904–1977), English illustrator, niece of Bernard Pares
- Geoffrey Pares, Australian tennis player
- Norman Pares (1857–1936), English Anglican priest and amateur footballer, brother of Bernard Pares
- Richard Pares (1902–1958), British historian, son of Bernard Pares
- Susan Pares, married name Susan Jellicoe (1907–1986), English plantswoman, photographer, writer and editor, daughter of Bernard Pares

== See also ==
- Parés
- Pars (surname)
