= Parés =

Parés is a surname, and may refer to:

- Arnoldo Parés (born 1922), Argentine boxer
- Francisco Parés Alicea (born c.1988), Puerto Rican accountant and government official
- Jaime Parés (born 1955), Spanish sports shooter
- Natalia Parés Vives (born 1955), Spanish chess player and teacher
- Pablo Parés (born 1978), Argentine film director and actor
- Rómulo Parés (1925–2000), Argentine boxer
- Víctor Parés (born 1966), Puerto Rican politician

== See also ==
- Pares (surname)
- Parès
