= Jaden Williams (gridiron football) =

American gridiron football player (born 2002)

No. 80 – BC Lions
- Position: Wide receiver
- Roster status: Active
- CFL status: American

Personal information
- Born: November 23, 2002 (age 23)
- Listed height: 5 ft 11 in (1.80 m)
- Listed weight: 185 lb (84 kg)

Career information
- High school: Hendrickson (Pflugerville, Texas)
- College: Boston College (2021–2023); Texas State (2024)
- NFL draft: 2025: undrafted

Career history
- Vegas Knight Hawks (2026)*; BC Lions (2026–present)
- * Offseason or practice squad member only
- Stats at CFL.ca

Jaden Williams (born November 23, 2002) is an American professional football wide receiver. He played college football for the Boston College Eagles and Texas State Bobcats.

== Early life ==
Williams was born on November 23, 2002. He attended Hendrickson High School in Pflugerville, Texas. Williams played at wide receiver and defensive back, recording 60 catches for 1,285 yards, 16 touchdowns with 24 carries for 279 yards and 3 touchdowns as a senior. He also added two touchdowns on special teams.

== College career ==
Williams played college football for the Boston College Eagles from 2021 to 2023 and Texas State Bobcats in 2024. In three seasons at Boston College, he had 42 receptions for 571 yards and six touchdowns, while adding eight rushing yards and a touchdown. On December 16, 2023, Williams transferred to Texas State University. In 13 games, he logged 57 catches for 807 yards and seven touchdowns with nine rushing yards.

== Professional career ==
Pre-draft measurables
Height	Weight	Arm length	Hand span	40-yard dash	10-yard split	20-yard split	20-yard shuttle	Three-cone drill	Vertical jump	Broad jump
5 ft 9 1/4 in (1.76 m)	170 lb (77 kg)	31 3/4 in (0.81 m)	8 7/8 in (0.23 m)	4.54 s	1.53 s	2.64 s	4.26 s	7.00 s	36 in (0.91 m)	10 ft 10 in (3.30 m)
All values from Pro Day

=== Vegas Knight Hawks ===
On January 29, 2026, Williams signed with the Vegas Knight Hawks of the Indoor Football League (IFL).

=== BC Lions ===
On February 12, 2026, Williams signed with the BC Lions of the Canadian Football League (CFL). On May 31, he was reassigned to the Lions' practice roster. On June 19, 2026, Williams was promoted back to the active roster and made his CFL debut against the Hamilton Tiger-Cats, recording three catches for 52 yards.Williams was again reassigned to the practice roster the following week, but was again promoted the active roster on July 3, 2026, and served as the returner for the next five games, in which he recorded 15 kick returns for 291 yards, 28 punt returns for 306 yards and two missed field goal returns for 44 yards. On August 12, 2026, Williams was again reassigned to the Lions' practice roster. On October 22, 2026, Williams was promoted to the Lions' active roster for the fourth time that season. On October 26, 2026, Williams was again reassigned to the Lions' practice roster ahead of the Western Semi-Final. On November 8, 2026, Williams became a free agent as his contract expired at the conclusion of the Lions' season. On November 10, 2026, Williams re-signed with the Lions.
