= Lincoln Pare =

American football player (born 2001)

Profile
- Position: Running back

Personal information
- Born: June 29, 2001 (age 25)
- Listed height: 5 ft 9 in (1.75 m)
- Listed weight: 200 lb (91 kg)

Career information
- High school: Houston (Germantown, Tennessee)
- College: Arkansas State (2020–2021); Texas State (2022–2025)
- NFL draft: 2026: undrafted

Career history
- Indianapolis Colts (2026)*
- * Offseason or practice squad member only

Awards and highlights
- Second-team All-Sun Belt (2025)

Lincoln Pare (born June 29, 2001) is an American professional football running back. He played college football for the Arkansas State Red Wolves and Texas State Bobcats.

== Early life ==
Pare attended Houston High School in Germantown, Tennessee, and committed to play college football for the Arkansas State Red Wolves.

== College career ==
=== Arkansas State ===
In two seasons at Arkansas State in 2020 and 2021, he totaled 905 rushing yards, 368 receiving yards, and six total touchdowns. After the 2021 season, he entered the NCAA transfer portal.

=== Texas State ===
Pare transferred to play for the Texas State Bobcats. In 2022, he ran for a team-high 772 yards and six touchdowns. Heading into the 2023 season, Pare tore his ACL, causing him to miss the entirety of the season. In 2024, he played in all 13 games, rushing for 554 yards and eight touchdowns on 95 carries. Pare headed into the 2025 season, once again as the team's starting running back. He finished the 2025 season with 1,128 rushing yards and 12 touchdowns on 210 carries.

== Professional career ==
Pre-draft measurables
Height	Weight	Arm length	Hand span	Wingspan	40-yard dash	10-yard split	20-yard split	20-yard shuttle	Three-cone drill	Vertical jump	Broad jump	Bench press
5 ft 8 1/8 in (1.73 m)	190 lb (86 kg)	27 3/8 in (0.70 m)	8 7/8 in (0.23 m)	5 ft 7 in (1.70 m)	4.58 s	1.59 s	2.69 s	4.40 s	7.13 s	37.0 in (0.94 m)	10 ft 2 in (3.10 m)	23 reps
All values from Pro Day

After not being selected in the 2026 NFL draft, Pare signed with the Indianapolis Colts as an undrafted free agent. On July 27, 2026, he was waived by Indianapolis.
