= 2022 FCS All-America college football team =

College football honors

The 2022 FCS College Football All-America Team includes those players of American college football who have been honored by various selector organizations as the best players at their respective positions, in the Football Championship Subdivision (FCS). The selector organizations award the "All-America" honor annually following the conclusion of the fall college football season.

The 2022 FCS College Football All-America Team is composed of the following College Football All-American first teams chosen by the following selector organizations: Associated Press (AP), American Football Coaches Association (AFCA), Stats Perform (STATS), Phil Steele, and Walter Camp Football Foundation (WCFF).

Currently, the NCAA does not recognizes any organization as an official selector for the FCS College Football All-America Team, so no player can be selected as a consensus selection, let alone a unanimous All-American.

== Offense ==
=== Quarterback ===
- Lindsey Scott Jr., Incarnate Word (AP, AFCA, STATS, Phil Steele, WCFF)
- Tim DeMorat, Fordham (STATS, AP-2)

=== Running back ===
- Jaden Shirden, Monmouth (AFCA, STATS, Phil Steele, WCFF, AP-2)
- Geno Hess, Southeast Missouri State (AP, AFCA, WCFF)
- Jaleel McLaughlin, Youngstown State (AP, STATS, Phil Steele)
- Ulonzo Gilliam, UC Davis (AP-2)

=== Fullback ===
- Hunter Luepke, North Dakota State (STATS, Phil Steele)

=== Wide receiver ===
- Hayden Hatten, Idaho (AP, AFCA, STATS, WCFF)
- Fotis Kokosioulis, Fordham (AP, STATS, Phil Steele, WCFF)
- Xavier Gipson, Stephen F. Austin (AP, STATS, Phil Steele)
- Joey Hobert, Utah Tech (AFCA, AP-2)
- Andrei Iosivas, Princeton (Phil Steele, AP-2)
- Xavier Smith, Florida A&M (AP-2)

=== Tight end ===
- Ryan Miller, Furman (AP, AFCA, STATS, Phil Steele)
- Martin Marshel, Sacramento State (WCFF, AP-2)

=== Offensive linemen ===
- Cody Mauch, North Dakota State (AP, AFCA, STATS, Phil Steele, WCFF)
- Mason McCormick, South Dakota State (AP, AFCA, Phil Steele, WCFF)
- McClendon Curtis, Chattanooga (AFCA, STATS, Phil Steele, AP-2)
- Garret Greenfield, South Dakota State (AP, STATS, Phil Steele)
- Colby Sorsdal, William & Mary (AP, AFCA, WCFF)
- Mark Evans II, Arkansas-Pine Bluff (STATS, Phil Steele, AP-2)
- Nash Jensen, North Dakota State (AP, WCFF)
- Nick Olsofska, Holy Cross (AFCA, WCFF)
- Luke Newman, Holy Cross (STATS)
- Nick Amoah, UC Davis (AP-2)
- Ryan Coll, Richmond (AP-2)
- Brandon Weldon, Sacramento State (AP-2)

== Defense ==
=== Defensive linemen ===
- Jay Person, Chattanooga (AP, AFCA, STATS, Phil Steele, WCFF)
- Caleb Sanders, South Dakota State (AP, AFCA, STATS, Phil Steele, WCFF)
- David Walker, Central Arkansas (AP, AFCA, STATS, Phil Steele, WCFF)
- Spencer Waege, North Dakota State (AP, STATS, Phil Steele, WCFF)
- Isaiah Land, Florida A&M (AFCA)
- Ty French, Gardner-Webb (AP-2)
- Malik Hamm, Lafayette (AP-2)
- Devonnsha Maxwell, Chattanooga (AP-2)
- Josiah Silver, Delaware (AP-2)

=== Linebacker ===
- John Pius, William & Mary (AP, AFCA, STATS, Phil Steele, WCFF)
- Zeke Vandenburgh, Illinois State (AP, AFCA, STATS, Phil Steele, WCFF)
- Johnny Buchanan, Delaware (AP, STATS, Phil Steele, WCFF)
- John H. Ford II, UT Martin (AFCA, STATS)
- BJ Davis, South Carolina State (Phil Steele, AP-2)
- Aubrey Miller Jr., Jackson State (STATS, AP-2)
- Joe Andreessen, Bryant (AP-2)

=== Defensive backs ===
- Alijah Huzzie, East Tennessee State (AP, AFCA, STATS, Phil Steele, WCFF)
- Marcus Hillman, Elon (AP, STATS, Phil Steele, WCFF)
- Robby Hauck, Montana (AP, STATS, Phil Steele)
- Marte Mapu, Sacramento State (AP, STATS, WCFF)
- Eddie Heckard, Weber State (STATS, Phil Steele, AP-2)
- Khalil Baker, North Carolina Central (AP, AFCA)
- Justin Ford, Montana (AFCA, AP-2)
- Devin Haskins, Holy Cross (WCFF)
- Kedrick Whitehead, Delaware (AFCA)
- Maxwell Anderson, Weber State (AP-2)
- Kameron Brown, Chattanooga (AP-2)
- Luke Glenna, St. Thomas (AP-2)

== Special teams ==
=== Placekicker ===
- Skyler Davis, Elon (AP, AFCA, STATS, Phil Steele, WCFF)
- Matthew Cook, Northern Iowa (AP-2)

=== Punter ===
- Jake Gerardi, Southern Utah (AP, AFCA, STATS, Phil Steele, WCFF)
- Patrick Rohrbach, Montana (AP-2)

=== Return specialist / All-purpose ===
- Dylan Laube, New Hampshire (AP, STATS, Phil Steele, WCFF)
- Abraham Williams, Weber State (AFCA, STATS, Phil Steele)
- Jarrod Barnes, Central Arkansas (STATS, Phil Steele)
- Devron Harper, Mercer (STATS)
- Hunter Luepke, North Dakota State (AP-2)

=== Long snapper ===
- Robert Soderholm, VMI (STATS, Phil Steele)
- Brock Powers, UT Martin (AFCA)

== See also ==
- 2022 College Football All-America Team
- 2022 All-Big 12 Conference football team
- 2022 All-Big Ten Conference football team
- 2022 All-SEC football team
- 2022 All-ACC football team

== Sources ==
- Associated Press (AP):
- American Football Coaches Association (AFCA):
- Phil Steele:
- Stats Perform (STATS):
- Walter Camp Football Foundation (WCFF):
