= 2022 Idaho State Bengals football team =

American college football season

2022 Idaho State Bengals football
- Conference: Big Sky Conference
- Record: 1–10 (1–7 Big Sky)
- Head coach: Charlie Ragle (1st season)
- Offensive coordinator: Taylor Mazzone (1st season)
- Offensive scheme: Spread
- Defensive coordinator: Tim Schaffner (1st season)
- Base defense: 3–4
- Home stadium: Holt Arena

2022 Big Sky Conference football standings
	Conf.			Overall
Team	W		L	W		L
No. 4 Montana State +^	8	–	0	12	–	2
No. 5 Sacramento State +^	8	–	0	12	–	1
No. 9 Weber State ^	6	–	2	10	–	3
No. 18 Idaho ^	6	–	2	7	–	5
No. 25 UC Davis	5	–	3	6	–	5
No. 14 Montana ^	4	–	4	8	–	5
Portland State	3	–	5	4	–	7
Eastern Washington	2	–	6	3	–	8
Northern Colorado	2	–	6	3	–	8
Northern Arizona	2	–	6	3	–	8
Idaho State	1	–	7	1	–	10
Cal Poly	1	–	7	2	–	9
+ – Conference co-champions; ^ – FCS playoff participant; Rankings from STATS Poll

The 2022 Idaho State Bengals football team represented Idaho State University in the Big Sky Conference during the 2022 NCAA Division I FCS football season. In their only season under head coach Charlie Ragle, the Bengals were 1–10 (1–7 in Big Sky, last) and played their home games on campus at Holt Arena in Pocatello, Idaho.

Hired in December 2021, Ragle was previously the special teams coach at California of the Pac-12 Conference. After the season, he resigned in late November 2022 to join the staff at Arizona State.

== Preseason ==
=== Polls ===
On July 25, 2022, during the virtual Big Sky Kickoff, the Bengals were predicted to finish in a tie for eleventh in the Big Sky by the coaches and last by the media.

=== Preseason All–Big Sky team ===
The Bengals did not have any players selected to the preseason all-Big Sky team.

== Roster ==
2022 Idaho State Bengals football team roster
Players
Coaches
Offense

Pos.	#	Name	Class
WR	1	Xavier Guillory	So
WR	2	Chedon James	Fr
WR	4	Shane Dailey Jr.	So
RB	5	Raiden Hunter	So
QB	6	Jake Sanders	So
QB	7	Hunter Hays	So
WR	8	Jovan Sowell	Fr
WR	9	Jalen Johnson	Fr
WR	10	Benjamin Omayebu	So
QB	11	Keegan Thompson	Fr
WR	12	Oakley Hussey	So
WR	13	Brandon Johnson	So
QB	14	Mikey Zele	Fr
WR	15	Christian Fredericksen	So
QB	16	Sagan Gronauer	So
TE	17	Cyrus Wallace	Jr
QB	18	Tyler Vander Waal	Jr
RB	20	Damir Collins	Fr
WR	22	Aidan Garcia	Fr
WR	23	Kaysen Isom	Fr
RB	24	Keoua Kauhi	So
RB	25	Hunter Killian	Fr
RB	32	Soujah Gasu	Jr
TE	37	Kurtis Adkinson	Fr
RB	40	Jack Whitmer	Fr
OL	50	Joseph Toilolo	Fr
OL	53	John Perko	Jr
OL	54	Terron Carey	Jr
OL	58	Tyler Clemons	Sr
OL	61	Braden Croteau	Fr
OL	63	Carson Fugleberg	Fr
OL	64	Gunnar Clark	Fr
OL	66	Avery Demmons	Jr
OL	67	Aron Oliva	Fr
OL	68	Jude Steffen	So
OL	70	Hudson Chasko	Fr
OL	72	Syr Riley	Jr
OL	73	Isaiah Hullum	Fr
OL	74	Owen Stewart	So
OL	75	Jacob Angel	Jr
OL	76	Jaedon Garcia	Fr
OL	77	Jack O'Connor	Fr
OL	78	Jay Wadley	Fr
WR	80	Julian Mason	Fr
WR	81	Connor Maloney	Fr
WR	82	Bryler Shurtliff	Fr
TE	83	Maika Heck	So
TE	85	Joseph Bertao	Fr
TE	86	Preston Helwege	So
TE	88	Mike Davis	Jr

Defense

Pos.	#	Name	Class
CB	1	Josh Alford	So
CB	2	Tylor Bohannon	So
S	5	Jayden Bell	Fr
S	6	Calvin Pitcher	So
DL	7	Chestar Geffard	Jr
DL	8	Terrance Jones	Sr
S	9	Quantraill Morris-Walker	So
S	11	Junior Damuni	Fr
DB	13	Ja'Maree Boone	Fr
LB	14	Jack Genova	Sr
CB	16	Xavier Goldsmith	Fr
DL	17	Sam Benjamin	Fr
S	18	Quade Renfro	So
DL	20	Myles Amey	Fr
DB	21	Jihad Brown	So
DB	22	Cameren Davis	Sr
LB	23	Teilor Tuioti	So
S	24	Cameron Minor	So
LB	25	DJ Hagler	Sr
DB	26	Alec Flanagan	So
LB	27	Vaeaega Gasu	So
LB	28	Dason Brooks	Fr
DL	29	Cortland Horton	So
LB	30	Charles Ike	Sr
CB	34	Deville Dickerson	Fr
CB	36	Jason Moncure	Fr
LB	38	William Wallis	Fr
LB	39	Justin Douglas	Fr
DL	42	Garrett McKenna	Fr
LB	43	Tuaoa Tauili'ili	Fr
LB	44	Kris Sanchez	So
LB	45	Preston Helu	So
DL	46	Kamiah Olsen	Fr
DL	47	Zack Conner	So
LB	49	Cannen Siegel	Fr
DL	51	Curtis Hill	Fr
DL	52	Spencer Tatafu	So
DL	55	Zion To'oto'o	Fr
DL	56	Jameson Helu	Fr
LB	57	Camron Pitcher	Jr
LB	59	Todd Payne	So
DL	60	Hunter Hill	Fr
DL	91	Raemo Trevino	Sr
LB	92	Nick Larriva	So
DL	93	Mason Harwood	Fr
DL	94	Josiah Sagale	Fr
DL	95	Tyler Gonzalez	So
DL	96	David Rowe	So
DL	97	De'Qua Lang	So
DE	98	Colin Kraemer	Fr
DL	99	Jake McGinnis	So

Special teams

Pos.	#	Name	Class
K	10	Ian Hershey	Fr
K	31	Regan Baker	Fr
K	35	Thomas Kopcho	Fr
LS	48	Justice Brusatto	So
K	87	Connor Slack	Fr

Head coach

- Charlie Ragle

Coordinators/assistant coaches

- Taylor Mazzone – Offensive coordinator
- Tim Schaffner – Defensive coordinator
- David Fiefia – Running backs
- Byron Hout – Defensive flex
- JB Hall Jr. – Safeties
- Tyson Munns – Director of football operations
- Paea Moala – Video coordinator
- Kody Hensley – Linebackers
- Tanner Gueller – Offensive assistant
- Quintin Kohorst – Director of equipment operations
- Dustin Enslinger – Head athletic trainer
- Brandon Stephens – Director of strength & conditioning

Legend

- (C) Team captain
- (S) Suspended
- (I) Ineligible
- Injured
- Redshirt

Roster
Last update: May 27, 2023

== Schedule ==
Date	Time	Opponent	Site	TV	Result	Attendance
August 27	12:30 p.m.	at UNLV*	Allegiant Stadium; Paradise, NV	CBSSN	L 21–52	19,579
September 10	6:00 p.m.	at San Diego State*	Snapdragon Stadium; San Diego, CA	MWN	L 7–38	27,865
September 17	1:00 p.m.	Central Arkansas*	Holt Arena; Pocatello, ID	ESPN+	L 16–31	5,125
September 24	1:00 p.m.	at Northern Colorado	Nottingham Field; Greeley, CO	ESPN+	L 14–35	5,292
October 1	1:00 p.m.	No. 3 Montana	Holt Arena; Pocatello, ID	ESPN+	L 20–28	6,659
October 8	2:00 p.m.	at No. 4 Montana State	Bobcat Stadium; Bozeman, MT	ESPN+	L 6–37	21,647
October 15	1:00 p.m.	Cal Poly^{†}	Holt Arena; Pocatello, ID	ESPN+	W 40–31	5,921
October 22	1:00 p.m.	Northern Arizona	Holt Arena; Pocatello, ID	ESPN+	L 10–24	N/A
November 5	5:00 p.m.	at UC Davis	UC Davis Health Stadium; Davis, CA	ESPN+	L 3–43	6,802
November 12	1:00 p.m.	at No. 7 Weber State	Stewart Stadium; Ogden, UT	ESPN+	L 7–45	7,756
November 19	1:00 p.m.	No. 21т Idaho	Holt Arena; Pocatello, ID (rivalry)	ESPN+	L 7–38	7,706
*Non-conference game; ^{†}Homecoming; Rankings from STATS Poll released prior to the game; All times are in Mountain time

== Game summaries ==
=== at UNLV (FBS) ===
Idaho State Bengals (0–0) at UNLV Rebels (FBS) (0–0) – Game summary

Quarter	1	2	3	4	Total
Bengals	7	0	7	7	21
Rebels (FBS)	10	35	0	7	52

at Allegiant Stadium • Paradise, Nevada

- Date: August 27
- Game time: 12:30 p.m. MDT
- Game weather: None (indoor stadium)
- Game attendance: 19,579
- Referee: Kevin Boitmann
- TV announcers (CBSSN): Chris Lewis (play-by-play) and Donte Whitner (analyst)
- Box score, Recap

Game information

First quarter

- (9:13) UNLV – Aidan Robbins 1-yard run, Daniel Gutierrez kick (Drive: 11 plays, 53 yards, 5:40; UNLV 7–0)
- (3:52) UNLV – Daniel Gutierrez 39-yard field goal (Drive: 4 plays, 9 yards, 1:39; UNLV 10–0)
- (0:15) IDST – Jalen Johnson 55-yard pass from Tyler Vander Waal, Ian Hershey kick (Drive: 7 plays, 75 yards, 3:37; UNLV 10–7)

Second quarter

- (13:02) UNLV – Aidan Robbins 2-yard run, Daniel Gutierrez kick (Drive: 7 plays, 75 yards, 2:13; UNLV 17–7)
- (9:29) UNLV – Ricky White 72-yard pass from Doug Brumfield, Daniel Gutierrez kick (Drive: 3 plays, 80 yards, 0:54; UNLV 24–7)
- (6:49) UNLV – Kyle Williams 9-yard pass from Doug Brumfield, Daniel Gutierrez kick (Drive: 2 plays, 31 yards, 0:36; UNLV 31–7)
- (3:23) UNLV – Ricky White 19-yard pass from Doug Brumfield, Daniel Gutierrez kick (Drive: 5 plays, 73 yards, 2:10; UNLV 38–7)
- (0:42) UNLV – Aidan Robbins 7-yard pass from Doug Brumfield, Daniel Gutierrez kick (Drive: 7 plays, 62 yards, 1:31; UNLV 45–7)

Third quarter

- (3:04) IDST – Hunter Hays 5-yard run, Ian Hershey kick (Drive: 12 plays, 52 yards, 4:49; UNLV 45–14)

Fourth quarter

- (10:54) IDST – Xavier Guillory 19-yard pass from Hunter Hays, Ian Hershey kick (Drive: 11 plays, 51 yards, 3:55; UNLV 45–21)
- (5:05) UNLV – Zyell Griffin 14-yard pass from Cameron Friel, Daniel Gutierrez kick (Drive: 4 plays, 66 yards, 2:09; UNLV 52–21)

Statistics	IDST	UNLV
First downs	13	23
Plays–yards	67–241	59–554
Rushes–yards	40–50	33–149
Passing yards	191	405
Passing: comp–att–int	14–27–1	26–35–0
Time of possession	29:36	30:24

Team	Category	Player	Statistics
Idaho State	Passing	Tyler Vander Waal	7/13, 130 yards, 1 TD, 1 INT
Idaho State	Rushing	Raiden Hunter	13 carries, 26 yards
Idaho State	Receiving	Xavier Guillory	4 receptions, 73 yards, 1 TD
UNLV	Passing	Doug Brumfield	21/25, 356 yards, 4 TD
UNLV	Rushing	Courtney Reese	7 carries, 73 yards
UNLV	Receiving	Ricky White	8 receptions, 182 yards, 2 TD

=== at San Diego State (FBS) ===
Idaho State Bengals (0–1) at San Diego State Aztecs (FBS) (0–1) – Game summary

Quarter	1	2	3	4	Total
Bengals	7	0	0	0	7
Aztecs (FBS)	14	7	3	14	38

at Snapdragon Stadium • San Diego, California

- Date: September 10
- Game time: 6:00 p.m. MDT
- Game weather: Cloudy • Temperature: 83 °F (28 °C) • Wind: N at 3 miles per hour (4.8 km/h)
- Game attendance: 27,865
- Referee: Abram Anaya
- TV announcers (MWN): Jon Schaeffer (play-by-play) and J. R. Tolver (analyst)
- Box score, Recap

Game information

First quarter

- (14:46) IDST – Xavier Guillory 75-yard pass from Tyler Vander Waal, Ian Hershey kick (Drive: 2 plays, 75 yards, 0:14; Idaho State 7–0)
- (11:58) SDSU – Jordan Byrd 66-yard punt return, Jack Browning kick (Tied 7–7)
- (5:01) SDSU – Braxton Burmeister 47-yard run, Jack Browning kick (Drive: 3 plays, 57 yards, 1:10; San Diego State 14–7)

Second quarter

- (14:48) SDSU – Jordan Byrd 53-yard run, Jack Browning kick (Drive: 5 plays, 75 yards, 1:57; San Diego State 21–7)

Third quarter

- (2:32) SDSU – Jack Browning 20-yard field goal (Drive: 10 plays, 91 yards, 3:30; San Diego State 24–7)

Fourth quarter

- (8:35) SDSU – Tyrell Shavers 14-yard pass from Braxton Burmeister, Jack Browning kick (Drive: 7 plays, 80 yards, 2:42; San Diego State 31–7)
- (5:22) SDSU – Cam Davis 3-yard run, Jack Browning kick (Drive: 5 plays, 69 yards, 1:49; San Diego State 38–7)

Statistics	IDST	SDSU
First downs	14	19
Plays–yards	73–338	69–488
Rushes–yards	33–80	43–380
Passing yards	258	108
Passing: comp–att–int	24–40–0	15–26–0
Time of possession	30:40	29:20

Team	Category	Player	Statistics
Idaho State	Passing	Hunter Hays	18/30, 140 yards
Idaho State	Rushing	Raiden Hunter	13 carries, 53 yards
Idaho State	Receiving	Xavier Guillory	3 receptions, 94 yards, 1 TD
San Diego State	Passing	Braxton Burmeister	15/26, 108 yards, 1 TD
San Diego State	Rushing	Jaylon Armstead	5 carries, 96 yards
San Diego State	Receiving	Tyrell Shavers	3 receptions, 36 yards, 1 TD

=== vs Central Arkansas ===
Central Arkansas Bears (0–2) vs Idaho State Bengals (0–2) – Game summary

Quarter	1	2	3	4	Total
Bears	0	14	14	3	31
Bengals	3	0	0	13	16

at Holt Arena • Pocatello, Idaho

- Date: September 17
- Game time: 1:00 p.m.
- Game weather: None (indoor stadium)
- Game attendance: 5,125
- Referee: Brent Baumann
- TV announcers (ESPN+): Dylan Carder (play-by-play) and Kody Graves (analyst)
- Box score, Recap

Game information

First quarter

- (6:33) IDST – Ian Hershey 23-yard field goal (Drive: 13 plays, 85 yards, 5:08; Idaho State 3–0)

Second quarter

- (12:05) UCA – Darius Hale 2-yard run, Hayden Ray kick (Drive: 9 plays, 80 yards, 2:48; Central Arkansas 7–3)
- (6:27) UCA – Darius Hale 13-yard pass from Will McElvain, Hayden Ray kick (Drive: 5 plays, 70 yards, 1:44; Central Arkansas 14–3)

Third quarter

- (11:26) UCA – Corley Hooper 3-yard fumble return, Hayden Ray kick (Central Arkansas 21–3)
- (6:24) UCA – Darius Hale 1-yard run, Hayden Ray kick (Drive: 8 plays, 45 yards, 2:57; Central Arkansas 28–3)

Fourth quarter

- (9:37) IDST – Benjamin Omayebu 28-yard run, run failed (Drive: 6 plays, 68 yards, 1:58; Central Arkansas 28–9)
- (6:56) UCA – Hayden Ray 29-yard field goal (Drive: 6 plays, 65 yards, 2:35; Central Arkansas 31–9)
- (5:08) IDST – Benjamin Omayebu 3-yard run, Ian Hershey kick (Drive: 5 plays, 53 yards, 1:37; Central Arkansas 31–16)

Statistics	UCA	IDST
First downs	17	22
Plays–yards	65–418	74–408
Rushes–yards	36–159	38–124
Passing yards	259	284
Passing: comp–att–int	24–29–0	25–36–2
Time of possession	27:32	32:28

Team	Category	Player	Statistics
Central Arkansas	Passing	Will McElvain	24/29, 259 yards, 1 TD
Central Arkansas	Rushing	Darius Hale	17 carries, 114 yards, 2 TD
Central Arkansas	Receiving	John David White	7 receptions, 103 yards
Idaho State	Passing	Hunter Hays	25/36, 284 yards, 2 INT
Idaho State	Rushing	Raiden Hunter	16 carries, 72 yards
Idaho State	Receiving	Xavier Guillory	6 receptions, 90 yards

=== at Northern Colorado ===
Idaho State Bengals (0–3) at Northern Colorado Bears (1–2) – Game summary

Quarter	1	2	3	4	Total
Bengals	0	14	0	0	14
Bears	0	14	0	21	35

at Nottingham Field • Greeley, Colorado

- Date: September 24
- Game time: 1:00 p.m.
- Game weather: Sunny, 80 °F (27 °C)
- Game attendance: 5,292
- Referee: Scott Root
- TV: ESPN+
- Box score, Recap

Game information

First quarter

- No scoring plays

Second quarter

- (12:22) UNCO – Ty Arrington 8-yard pass from Dylan McCaffrey, Hunter Green kick (Drive: 3 plays, 43 yards, 0:51; Northern Colorado 7–0)
- (9:21) IDST – Shane Dailey Jr. 29-yard pass from Hunter Hays, Ian Hershey kick (Drive: 8 plays, 75 yards, 3:01; Tied 7–7)
- (6:13) UNCO – David Afari 1-yard run, Hunter Green kick (Drive: 8 plays, 75 yards, 3:08; Northern Colorado 14–7)
- (2:30) IDST – Xavier Guillory 51-yard pass from Hunter Hays, Ian Hershey kick (Drive: 7 plays, 75 yards, 3:43; Tied 14–14)

Third quarter

- No scoring plays

Fourth quarter

- (14:23) UNCO – Elijah Dotson 2-yard run, Hunter Green kick (Drive: 15 plays, 77 yards, 6:32; Northern Colorado 21–14)
- (10:26) UNCO – Elijah Dotson 82-yard punt return, Hunter Green kick (Northern Colorado 28–14)
- (9:13) UNCO – Elijah Anderson-Taylor 47-yard fumble return, Hunter Green kick (Northern Colorado 35–14)

Statistics	IDST	UNCO
First downs	22	23
Plays–yards	69–423	69–384
Rushes–yards	29–141	41–150
Passing yards	282	234
Passing: comp–att–int	27–40–1	23–28–0
Time of possession	29:34	30:26

Team	Category	Player	Statistics
Idaho State	Passing	Hunter Hays	25/34, 264 yards, 2 TD, 1 INT
Idaho State	Rushing	Raiden Hunter	17 carries, 111 yards
Idaho State	Receiving	Xavier Guillory	7 receptions, 120 yards, 1 TD
Northern Colorado	Passing	Dylan McCaffrey	23/28, 234 yards, 1 TD
Northern Colorado	Rushing	Elijah Dotson	24 carries, 102 yards, 1 TD
Northern Colorado	Receiving	Alec Pell	6 receptions, 86 yards

=== No. 3 Montana ===
	1	2	3	4	Total
No. 3 Grizzlies	0	21	7	0	28
Bengals	3	3	0	14	20

=== At No. 4 Montana State ===
	1	2	3	4	Total
Bengals	6	0	0	0	6
No. 4 Bobcats	14	20	0	3	37

=== Cal Poly ===
	1	2	3	4	Total
Mustangs	7	0	10	14	31
Bengals	14	10	13	3	40

=== Northern Arizona ===
	1	2	3	4	Total
Lumberjacks	3	14	7	0	24
Bengals	0	7	0	3	10

=== At UC Davis ===
	1	2	3	4	Total
Bengals	3	0	0	0	3
Aggies	9	13	14	7	43

=== At No. 7 Weber State ===
	1	2	3	4	Total
Bengals	0	7	0	0	7
No. 7 Wildcats	7	14	10	14	45

=== No. 21т Idaho ===
	1	2	3	4	Total
#21 Vandals	7	17	7	7	38
Bengals	7	0	0	0	7
