= 2022 Northern Colorado Bears football team =

American college football season

2022 Northern Colorado Bears football
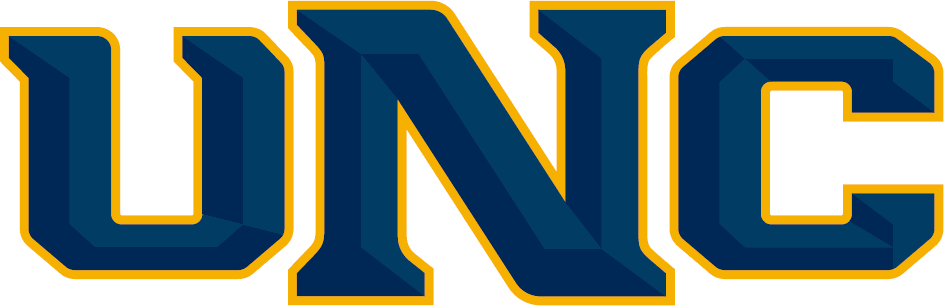
- Conference: Big Sky Conference
- Record: 3–8 (2–6 Big Sky)
- Head coach: Ed McCaffrey (2nd season)
- Offensive coordinator: Max McCaffrey (2nd season)
- Defensive coordinator: Scott Darnell (2nd season)
- Home stadium: Nottingham Field

2022 Big Sky Conference football standings
	Conf.			Overall
Team	W		L	W		L
No. 4 Montana State +^	8	–	0	12	–	2
No. 5 Sacramento State +^	8	–	0	12	–	1
No. 9 Weber State ^	6	–	2	10	–	3
No. 18 Idaho ^	6	–	2	7	–	5
No. 25 UC Davis	5	–	3	6	–	5
No. 14 Montana ^	4	–	4	8	–	5
Portland State	3	–	5	4	–	7
Eastern Washington	2	–	6	3	–	8
Northern Colorado	2	–	6	3	–	8
Northern Arizona	2	–	6	3	–	8
Idaho State	1	–	7	1	–	10
Cal Poly	1	–	7	2	–	9
+ – Conference co-champions; ^ – FCS playoff participant; Rankings from STATS Poll

The 2022 Northern Colorado Bears football team represented the University of Northern Colorado as a member of the Big Sky Conference during the 2022 NCAA Division I FCS football season. They were led by second-year head coach Ed McCaffrey and played their home games at Nottingham Field. McCaffrey was fired on November 21, 2022, two days after the Bears completed their season with a 3–8 record (2–6 in Big Sky play), repeating the win-loss record of the prior season.

== Preseason ==
=== Polls ===
On July 25, 2022, during the virtual Big Sky Kickoff, the Bengals were predicted to finish in a tie for eleventh in the Big Sky by the coaches and eleventh by the media.

=== Preseason All–Big Sky team ===
The Bears had one player selected to the preseason all-Big Sky team.

Defense

David Hoage – LB

== Schedule ==
Date	Time	Opponent	Site	TV	Result	Attendance
September 3	2:00 p.m.	Houston Baptist*	Nottingham Field; Greeley, CO	ESPN+	L 34–46	4,419
September 10	2:00 p.m.	at Wyoming*	War Memorial Stadium; Laramie, WY	MW Network	L 10–33	22,863
September 17	5:00 p.m.	at Lamar*	Provost Umphrey Stadium; Beaumont, TX	ESPN+	W 21–14	4,933
September 24	1:00 p.m.	Idaho State^{†}	Nottingham Field; Greeley, CO	ESPN+	W 35–14	5,292
October 1	7:00 p.m	at Idaho	Kibbie Dome; Moscow, ID	ESPN+	L 35–55	10,759
October 8	7:00 p.m.	at No. 5 Sacramento State	Hornet Stadium; Sacramento, CA	ESPN+	L 7–55	11,013
October 15	1:00 p.m.	No. 4 Montana State	Nottingham Field; Greeley, CO	ESPN+	L 14–37	4,796
October 22	1:00 p.m.	UC Davis	Nottingham Field; Greeley, CO	ESPN+	L 10–58	4,499
November 5	3:00 p.m.	at Portland State	Hillsboro Stadium; Hillsboro, OR	ESPN+	L 21–35	2,771
November 12	12:00 p.m.	Northern Arizona	Nottingham Field; Greeley, CO	ESPN+	W 21–20	3,769
November 19	2:00 p.m.	at Eastern Washington	Roos Field; Cheney, WA	ESPN+	L 21–45	4,099
*Non-conference game; ^{†}Homecoming; Rankings from STATS Poll released prior to the game; All times are in Mountain time

== Game summaries ==
=== vs Houston Baptist ===
	1	2	3	4	Total
Huskies	6	16	10	14	46
Bears	7	7	0	20	34

=== at Wyoming ===
	1	2	3	4	Total
Bears	0	0	3	7	10
Cowboys	3	6	7	17	33

=== at Lamar ===
	1	2	3	4	Total
Bears	7	7	7	0	21
Cardinals	0	7	0	7	14

Statistics

Statistics	Northern Colorado	Lamar
First downs	19	21
Total yards	270	299
Rushing yards	52	217
Passing yards	218	82
Turnovers	3	0
Time of possession	27:39	32:21

Team	Category	Player	Statistics
Northern Colorado	Passing	Jacob Sirmon	16/28; 218 total yards; 43 long
Northern Colorado	Rushing	David Afari	7 attempts; 41 yards; 11 long
Northern Colorado	Receiving	Trevis Graham	5 receptions; 97 total yards; 43 long
Lamar	Passing	Nick Yockey	10/11; 71 total yards; 16 long
Lamar	Rushing	Khalan Griffin	10 attempts; 66 total yards; 10 yards long
Lamar	Receiving	Sevonne Rhea	3 receptions; 36 yards; 16 yards long

=== vs Idaho State ===
Idaho State Bengals (0–3) at Northern Colorado Bears (1–2) – Game summary

Quarter	1	2	3	4	Total
Bengals	0	14	0	0	14
Bears	0	14	0	21	35

at Nottingham Field • Greeley, Colorado

- Date: September 24
- Game time: 1:00 p.m.
- Game weather: Sunny, 80 °F (27 °C)
- Game attendance: 5,292
- Referee: Scott Root
- TV: ESPN+

Game information

First quarter

- No scoring plays

Second quarter

- (12:22) UNCO – Ty Arrington 8-yard pass from Dylan McCaffrey, Hunter Green kick (Drive: 3 plays, 43 yards, 0:51; Northern Colorado 7–0)
- (9:21) IDST – Shane Dailey Jr. 29-yard pass from Hunter Hays, Ian Hershey kick (Drive: 8 plays, 75 yards, 3:01; Tied 7–7)
- (6:13) UNCO – David Afari 1-yard run, Hunter Green kick (Drive: 8 plays, 75 yards, 3:08; Northern Colorado 14–7)
- (2:30) IDST – Xavier Guillory 51-yard pass from Hunter Hays, Ian Hershey kick (Drive: 7 plays, 75 yards, 3:43; Tied 14–14)

Third quarter

- No scoring plays

Fourth quarter

- (14:23) UNCO – Elijah Dotson 2-yard run, Hunter Green kick (Drive: 15 plays, 77 yards, 6:32; Northern Colorado 21–14)
- (10:26) UNCO – Elijah Dotson 82-yard punt return, Hunter Green kick (Northern Colorado 28–14)
- (9:13) UNCO – Elijah Anderson-Taylor 47-yard fumble return, Hunter Green kick (Northern Colorado 35–14)

Statistics	IDST	UNCO
First downs	22	23
Plays–yards	69–423	69–384
Rushes–yards	29–141	41–150
Passing yards	282	234
Passing: comp–att–int	27–40–1	23–28–0
Time of possession	29:34	30:26

Team	Category	Player	Statistics
Idaho State	Passing	Hunter Hays	25/34, 264 yards, 2 TD, 1 INT
Idaho State	Rushing	Raiden Hunter	17 carries, 111 yards
Idaho State	Receiving	Xavier Guillory	7 receptions, 120 yards, TD
Northern Colorado	Passing	Dylan McCaffrey	23/28, 234 yards, TD
Northern Colorado	Rushing	Elijah Dotson	24 carries, 102 yards, TD
Northern Colorado	Receiving	Alec Pell	6 receptions, 86 yards

=== at Idaho ===
Northern Colorado Bears (2–2) vs Idaho Vandals (2–2) – Game summary

Quarter	1	2	3	4	Total
Bears	6	14	8	7	35
Vandals	10	14	21	10	55

at Kibbie Dome • Moscow, ID

- Date: October 1, 2022
- Game time: 7:00 p.m. MST
- Game weather: Sunny
- Game attendance: 10,759
- Referee: Steve Hanni
- TV: ESPN+

Game information

First quarter

- IDHO – Jermaine Jackson 26-yard pass from Gevani McCoy (Ricardo Chavez kick), 13:25. Drive: 4 play, 75 yards, 1:35.
- NCU – David Afari 14-yard run, 9:04. Drive: 8 plays, 75 yards, 4:21.
- IDHO – Ricardo Chavez 21-yard field goal, 0:40. Drive: 15 plays, 67 yards, 8:18.

Second quarter

- NCU – Ty Arrington 31-yard pass from Dylan McCaffrey (Devin Bale kick), 7:19. Drive: 3 plays, 71 yards, 1:03.
- IDHO – Elisha Cummings 27-yard run (Ricardo Chavez kick), 4:12. Drive: 7 plays, 75 yards, 3:07.
- NCU - Elijah Dotson 2-yard run (Devin Bale kick), 1:21. Drive: 7 plays, 75 yards, 2:51.
- IDHO - Elisha Cummings 25-yard run (Ricardo Chavez kick), 0:35. Drive: 5 plays, 75 yards, 0:46.

Third quarter

- IDHO – Anthony Woods 15-yard run (Ricardo Chavez kick), 10:35. Drive: 6 plays, 59 yards, 2:50.
- NCU – Elijah Dotson 8-yard pass from Dylan McCaffrey (Ty Arrington pass), 6:43. Drive: 11 plays, 75 yards, 3:52.
- IDHO - Hayden Hatten 35-yard pass from Gevani McCoy (Ricardo Chavez kick), 5:08. Drive: 4 plays, 75 yards, 1:35.
- IDHO - Hayden Hatten 9-yard pass from Gevani McCoy (Ricardo Chavez kick), 0:36. Drive: 7 plays, 34 yards, 3:13.

Fourth quarter

- IDHO - Elisha Cummings 12-yard pass from Gevani McCoy (Ricardo Chavez kick), 7:49. Drive: 12 plays, 88 yards, 6:22.
- IDHO - Richard Chavez 39-yard field goal, 5:02. Drive: 4 plays, 5 yards, 2:14.
- NCU – Ty Arrington 11-yard pass from Jacob Sirmon (Devin Bale kick), 0:51. Drive: 9 plays, 71 yards, 4:03.

Top passers

- NCU – Dylan McCaffrey – 17/26, 264 yards, 2 TD, 2 INT
- IDHO – Gevani McCoy – 22/27, 298 yards, 4 TD

Top rushers

- NCU – Elijah Dotson – 17 carries, 77 yards, TD
- IDHO – Anthony Woods – 17 carries, 96 yards, TD

Top receivers

- NCU – Ty Arrington – 4 receptions, 56 yards, 2 TD
- IDHO – Hayden Hatten – 8 receptions, 131 yards, 2 TD

=== at No. 5 Sacramento State ===
	1	2	3	4	Total
Bears	0	0	7	0	7
No. 5 Hornets	7	17	21	10	55

=== vs no. 4 Montana State ===
	1	2	3	4	Total
No. 4 Bobcats	3	14	13	7	37
Bears	7	7	0	0	14

=== vs UC Davis ===
	1	2	3	4	Total
Aggies	6	21	14	17	58
Bears	3	0	0	7	10

=== at Portland State ===
	1	2	3	4	Total
Bears	0	28	7	0	35
Vikings	14	0	0	7	21

=== vs Northern Arizona ===
	1	2	3	4	Total
Lumberjacks	7	3	0	10	20
Bears	3	0	10	8	21

=== at Eastern Washington ===
	1	2	3	4	Total
Bears	0	14	7	0	21
Eagles	7	14	14	10	45
