= 2022 Montana State Bobcats football team =

American college football season

2022 Montana State Bobcats football
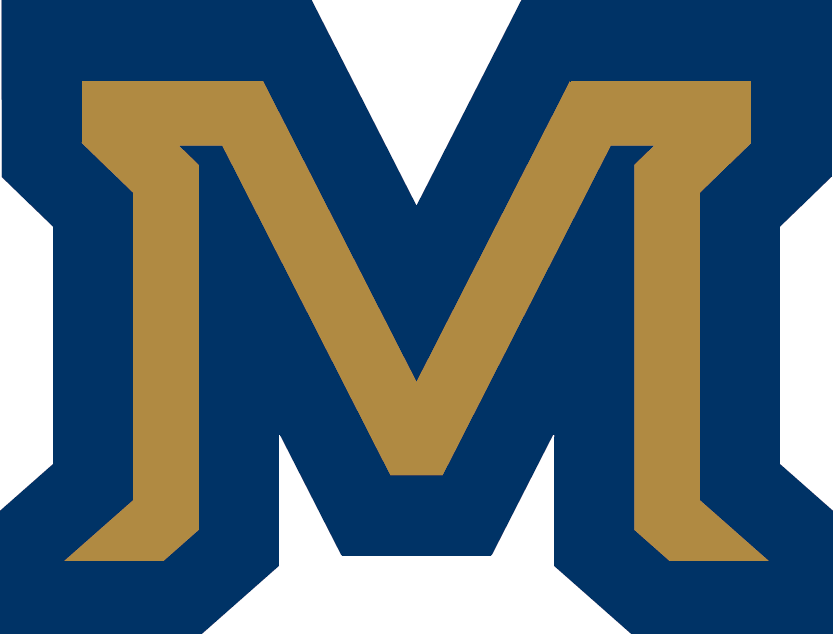

Big Sky co-champion

NCAA Division I Semifinal, L 18–39 at South Dakota State
- Conference: Big Sky Conference

Ranking
- STATS: No. 4
- FCS Coaches: No. 5
- Record: 12–2 (8–0 Big Sky)
- Head coach: Brent Vigen (2nd season)
- Offensive coordinator: Taylor Housewright (2nd season)
- Offensive scheme: Pro-style
- Defensive coordinator: Willie Mack Garza (1st season)
- Base defense: 4–2–5
- Home stadium: Bobcat Stadium

2022 Big Sky Conference football standings
	Conf.			Overall
Team	W		L	W		L
No. 4 Montana State +^	8	–	0	12	–	2
No. 5 Sacramento State +^	8	–	0	12	–	1
No. 9 Weber State ^	6	–	2	10	–	3
No. 18 Idaho ^	6	–	2	7	–	5
No. 25 UC Davis	5	–	3	6	–	5
No. 14 Montana ^	4	–	4	8	–	5
Portland State	3	–	5	4	–	7
Eastern Washington	2	–	6	3	–	8
Northern Colorado	2	–	6	3	–	8
Northern Arizona	2	–	6	3	–	8
Idaho State	1	–	7	1	–	10
Cal Poly	1	–	7	2	–	9
+ – Conference co-champions; ^ – FCS playoff participant; Rankings from STATS Poll

The 2022 Montana State Bobcats football team represented Montana State University as a member of the Big Sky Conference during the 2022 NCAA Division I FCS football season. The Bobcats were led by second-year head coach Brent Vigen and played their home games at Bobcat Stadium in Bozeman, Montana.

== Preseason ==
=== Polls ===
On July 25, 2022, during the virtual Big Sky Kickoff, the Bobcats were predicted to finish third in the Big Sky by the coaches and second by the media.

=== Preseason All–Big Sky team ===
The Bobcats had seven players selected to the preseason all-Big Sky team.

Offense

Tommy Mellott – QB

Isaiah Ifanse – RB

R.J. Fitzgerald – WR

Defense

Brody Grebe – DE

Callahan O'Reilly – ILB

Special teams

Bryce Leighton – P

Tommy Sullivan – LS

== Roster ==
2022 Montana State Bobcats football team roster
Players
Coaches
Offense

Pos.	#	Name	Class
WR	0	Malik Mullins	So
WR	1	Ravi Alston	GS
WR	2	Clevan Thomas Jr.	GS
WR	3	Coy Steel	Sr
QB	4	Tommy Mellott	So
RB	5	Garrett Coon	So
RB	7	Kaegun Williams	GS
TE	8	Derryk Snell	Jr
QB	9	Luke Abshire	Fr
QB	10	Sean Chambers	Jr
WR	11	Willie Patterson	Sr
RB	12	Jared White	Fr
RB	13	Elijah Elliott	So
WR	14	Taco Dowler	Fr
WR	16	Marqui Johnson	So
WR	17	Christian Anaya	Fr
QB	18	Sean Austin	Fr
FB	19	Jaharie Martin	So
RB	22	Isaiah Ifanse	Sr
RB	24	Lane Sumner	Jr
TE	41	R. J. Fitzgerald	Sr
FB	48	Max Murphy	Fr
G	51	Trey Yates	Fr
OL	55	J. T. Reed	So
G	56	Cole Sain	Jr
G	58	Aaron Richards	So
OL	60	Tommy Nilson	Fr
OL	62	Bear Old	Fr
OT	63	Rush Reimer	So
OL	64	Burke Mastel	Fr
C	65	Justus Perkins	So
OT	66	Titan Fleischmann	Fr
G	67	Joe McElroy	Sr
OL	68	Omar Aigbedion	Fr
G	70	Holden Sampson	So
OT	72	Connor Moore	Fr
OL	74	Jaden Perkins	Fr
OL	75	Jacob Kettels	Fr
G	76	Marcus Wehr	So
TE	80	Treyton Pickering	Jr
WR	81	Tayvian Williams	So
TE	82	Elijah Reynolds	Fr
WR	83	Dylan Snyder	Fr
WR	84	Noah Smith	Fr
WR	85	Aidan Garrigan	Fr
WR	86	Zachary Dodson-Greene	Fr
TE	87	Ryan Lonergan	So
TE	88	Rylan Schlepp	Fr
QB		Jordan Reed	Fr

Defense

Pos.	#	Name	Class
CB	0	Tyrel Thomas	Sr
CB	2	Dru Polidore	Fr
S	3	Rhedi Short	Sr
CB	4	James Campbell	Sr
S	5	Jeffrey Manning Jr.	Sr
DB	6	Miles Jackson	So
S, NB	7	Ty Okada	Sr
S, NB	8	Level Price Jr.	Jr
CB	9	Simeon Woodard	So
DE	10	Brody Grebe	So
DE	11	Kenneth Eiden IV	Fr
CB	12	Devin Davis	Fr
CB	13	Jackson Harmon	Fr
LB	14	Neil Daily	Fr
S	16	Michael Armstrong	Fr
DB	17	Caden Dowler	Fr
S	18	Kendric Bailey	So
S	20	Tyson Pottenger	Fr
DB	22	Takhari Carr	Fr
S	23	Aidan Parks	Fr
DB	25	Eli Aby	Fr
S, NB	26	Rylan Ortt	So
S	28	Jake D'Agostino	Fr
S	29	Max Kimball	Fr
LB	30	Danny Uluilakepa	So
LB	31	Jace Fitzgerald	Fr
LB	32	Jory Choate	Sr
DT	33	Blake Hehl	Jr
LB	34	Nolan Askelson	Jr
DB	35	Kade Cutler	Fr
ILB	40	Alex Johnson	Fr
LB	42	Ryan Krahe	Fr
LB	43	McCade O'Reilly	So
DE	44	Jake Vigen	Fr
DE	45	Hunter Parsons	Fr
DE	46	Logan Fredericksen	Fr
LB	47	Callahan O'Reilly	Sr
DL	50	Zack Black	Fr
DE	53	Luke Fedyk	Fr
DT	57	Tyson Regimbal	Sr
DT	69	Jaren Perkins	Fr
DT	91	Devin Slaughter	Jr
DT	92	Blake Schmidt	So
DT	93	Kyle Rygg	Sr
DE	94	David Alston	Jr
DT	95	Sebastian Valdez	So
DL	96	Paul Brott	Fr
DL	97	Ethan Abbott	Fr
DE	98	Ben Seymour	Jr

Special teams

Pos.	#	Name	Class
P	37	Bryce Leighton	So
K, P	38	Casey Kautzman	Fr
K	39	Blake Glessner	So
LS	71	Tommy Sullivan	So

Head coach

- Brent Vigen

Coordinators/assistant coaches

- Taylor Housewright (Offensive coordinator / quarterbacks)
- Willie Mack Garza (Defensive coordinator / Defensive backs)
- Bobby Daly (linebackers)
- Jimmy Beal (running backs)
- Justin Udy (special teams coordinator / wide receivers / pass game coordinator)
- Brian Armstrong (offensive line / run game coordinator)
- Tyler Walker (tight ends)
- Shawn Howe (defensive line / defensive run game coordinator)

Legend

- (C) Team captain
- (S) Suspended
- (I) Ineligible
- Injured
- Redshirt

Roster
Last update: July 24, 2022

== Schedule ==
Date	Time	Opponent	Rank	Site	TV	Result	Attendance
September 3	6:00 p.m.	McNeese State*	No. 4	Bobcat Stadium; Bozeman, MT	KWYB/ESPN+	W 40–17	21,687
September 10	1:00 p.m.	Morehead State*	No. 4	Bobcat Stadium; Bozeman, MT	KWYB/ESPN+	W 63–13	19,927
September 17	6:00 p.m.	vs. Oregon State*	No. 4	Providence Park; Portland, OR	P12N	L 28–68	25,218
September 24	2:00 p.m.	at No. 15 Eastern Washington	No. 4T	Roos Field; Cheney, WA	KBZK/ESPN+	W 38–35	7,200
October 1	8:15 p.m.	UC Davis	No. 4	Bobcat Stadium; Bozeman, MT	ESPNU	W 41–24	21,637
October 8	2:00 p.m.	Idaho State^{†}	No. 4	Bobcat Stadium; Bozeman, MT	KBZK/ESPN+	W 37–6	21,647
October 15	1:00 p.m.	at Northern Colorado	No. 4	Nottingham Field; Greeley, CO	KBZK/ESPN+	W 37–14	4,796
October 22	1:00 p.m.	No. 5 Weber State	No. 3	Bobcat Stadium; Bozeman, MT	KBZK/ESPN+	W 43–38	20,707
November 5	2:00 p.m.	at Northern Arizona	No. 3	Walkup Skydome; Flagstaff, AZ	KBZK/ESPN+	W 41–38	8,676
November 12	6:00 p.m.	at Cal Poly	No. 3	Alex G. Spanos Stadium; San Luis Obispo, CA	KBZK/ESPN+	W 72–28	5,369
November 19	12:00 p.m.	No. 13 Montana	No. 3	Bobcat Stadium; Bozeman, MT (rivalry, College GameDay)	KBZK/ESPN+	W 55–21	22,047
December 3	1:00 p.m.	No. 9 Weber State*	No. 3	Bobcat Stadium; Bozeman, MT (NCAA Division I Second Round)	ESPN+	W 33–25	16,397
December 9	8:15 p.m.	No. 6 William & Mary*	No. 3	Bobcat Stadium; Bozeman, MT (NCAA Division I Quarterfinal)	ESPN2/ESPN+	W 55–7	14,367
December 17	2:00 p.m.	at No. 1 South Dakota State*	No. 3	Dana J. Dykhouse Stadium; Brookings, SD (NCAA Division I Semifinal)	ESPN2/ESPN+	L 18–39	7,195
*Non-conference game; ^{†}Homecoming; Rankings from STATS Poll released prior to the game; All times are in Mountain time

== Game summaries ==
=== McNeese State ===
	1	2	3	4	Total
Cowboys	0	10	0	7	17
No. 4 Bobcats	0	17	16	7	40

=== Morehead State ===
	1	2	3	4	Total
Eagles	0	3	3	7	13
No. 4 Bobcats	28	7	14	14	63

=== At Oregon State ===
Previous meeting
First ever Meeting

No. 4 (FCS) Montana State Bobcats (2-0) vs Oregon State Beavers (2-0) – Game Summary

Quarter	1	2	3	4	Total
No. 4 Bobcats	7	7	7	7	28
Beavers	7	27	20	14	68

at Providence Park • Portland, Oregon

- Date: September 17th
- Game time: 5:00 p.m. PST
- Game weather: 68 °F (20 °C) • Wind: NW at 7 miles per hour (11 km/h) • Weather: Cloudy
- Game attendance: 25,218
- Referee: Francisco Villar
- TV announcers (P12N): Jordan Kent (play-by-play), Nigel Burton (analyst)

Game information

1st quarter

- OSU - Deshaun Fenwick runs for a 25-yard TD 11:20, (Everett Hayes kick) - Beavers 7-0, Drive: 7 plays, 90 yards, TOP: 3:33
- MST - Sean Chambers runs for a 7-yard TD 5:19, (Blake Glessner kick) - Tied 7-7, Drive: 10 plays, 66 yards, TOP: 5:54

2nd quarter

- OSU - Tre'Shaun Harrison 6-yard pass from Chance Nolan 14:51, (Everett Hayes kick) - Beavers 14-7, Drive: 14 plays, 75 yards, TOP: 5:28'
- OSU - Chance Nolan runs for a 1-yard TD 11:09, (Everett Hayes kick) - Beavers 21-7, Drive: 7 plays, 58 yards, TOP: 3:28
- MST – Marqui Johnson returns a kickoff for a 98-yard TD (Blake Glessner kick) - Beavers 21-14
- OSU - Silas Bolden 24-yard pass from Chance Nolan 6:19, (Everett Hayes kick) - Beavers 28-14, Drive: 8 plays, 75 yards, TOP: 4:34
- OSU - Anthony Gould 9-yard pass from Chance Nolan 4:14, (Extra Point is no good) - Beavers 34-14, Drive: 2 plays, 12 yards, TOP: 0:47

3rd quarter

- OSU – Anthony Gould returns a punt for an 80-yard TD (Everett Hayes kick) - Beavers 40-14
- MST - Sean Chambers runs for a 8-yard TD 7:21, (Blake Glessner kick) - Beavers 40-21, Drive: 11 plays, 75 yards, TOP: 5:20
- OSU - Damien Martinez runs for 7-yard TD 5:51, (Atticus Sappington kick) - Beavers 47-21, Drive: 3 plays, 20 yards, TOP: 1:18
- OSU - Anthony Gould 17-yard pass from Chance Nolan 1:09, (Atticus Sappington kick) - Beavers 54-21, Drive: 5 plays, 33 yards, TOP: 1:58

4th quarter

- OSU - Jam Griffin runs for a 23-yard TD 12:33, (Atticus Sappington kick) - Beavers 61-21, Drive: 6 plays, 54 yards, TOP: 2:48
- MST - Sean Chambers runs for a 1-yard TD 7:55, (Blake Blessner kick) - Beavers 61-28, Drive: 8 plays, 65 yards, TOP: 4:38
- OSU - Kanoa Shannon runs for a 3-yard TD 3:02, (Atticus Sappington kick) - Beavers 68-28, Drive: 10 plays, 64 yards, TOP: 4:51

Passing leaders

- Bobcats - Tommy Mellott 9-18, 101 yards, 3 INTs
- Beavers - Chance Nolan 19-25, 276 yards, 4 TDs

Rushing leaders

- Bobcats - Tommy Mellott 18 carries, 135 yards
- Beavers - Deshaun Fenwick 9 carries, 63 yards

Receiving leaders

- Bobcats - Derryk Snell 1 reception, 27 yards
- Beavers - Tre'Shaun Harrison 8 receptions, 133 yards, 1 TD
  Anthony Gould 5 receptions, 77 yards, 2 TDs

=== At No. 15 Eastern Washington ===
	1	2	3	4	Total
No. 4T Bobcats	10	14	7	7	38
No. 15 Eagles	14	7	0	14	35

=== UC Davis ===
	1	2	3	4	Total
Aggies	10	3	11	0	24
No. 4 Bobcats	7	17	14	3	41

=== Idaho State ===
	1	2	3	4	Total
Bengals	6	0	0	0	6
No. 4 Bobcats	14	20	0	3	37

=== At Northern Colorado ===
	1	2	3	4	Total
No. 4 Bobcats	3	14	13	7	37
Bears	7	7	0	0	14

=== No. 5 Weber State ===
	1	2	3	4	Total
No. 5 Wildcats	17	7	8	6	38
No. 3 Bobcats	9	18	16	0	43

=== At Northern Arizona ===
	1	2	3	4	Total
No. 3 Bobcats	17	0	7	17	41
Lumberjacks	7	14	7	10	38

=== At Cal Poly ===
	1	2	3	4	Total
No. 3 Bobcats	24	27	14	7	72
Mustangs	0	14	14	0	28

=== No. 13 Montana ===
	1	2	3	4	Total
No. 13 Grizzlies	7	0	0	14	21
No. 3 Bobcats	21	10	10	14	55

== FCS Playoffs ==
=== No. 9 Weber State – Second Round ===
	1	2	3	4	Total
No. 9 Wildcats	3	7	0	15	25
No. 3 Bobcats	7	9	10	7	33

=== No. 6 William & Mary – Quarterfinals ===
	1	2	3	4	Total
No. 6 Tribe	0	0	0	7	7
No. 3 Bobcats	10	17	28	0	55

=== At No. 1 South Dakota State – Semifinals ===
	1	2	3	4	Total
No. 3 Bobcats	6	3	3	6	18
No. 1 Jackrabbits	14	14	8	3	39

== Ranking movements ==
Ranking movements Legend: ██ Increase in ranking ██ Decrease in ranking т = Tied with team above or below
	Week													
Poll	Pre	1	2	3	4	5	6	7	8	9	10	11	12	Final
STATS FCS	4	4	4	4т	4	4	4	3	3	3	3	3	3	4
Coaches	4	4	4	4т	4	5	4	2	2	3	3	3	3	5
