= 2022 Cal Poly Mustangs football team =

American college football season

2022 Cal Poly Mustangs football
- Conference: Big Sky Conference
- Record: 2–9 (1–7 Big Sky)
- Head coach: Beau Baldwin (3rd season)
- Offensive scheme: Multiple
- Co-defensive coordinators: Will Plemons (1st season); Cody Von Appen (1st season)
- Base defense: Multiple
- Home stadium: Alex G. Spanos Stadium

2022 Big Sky Conference football standings
	Conf.			Overall
Team	W		L	W		L
No. 4 Montana State +^	8	–	0	12	–	2
No. 5 Sacramento State +^	8	–	0	12	–	1
No. 9 Weber State ^	6	–	2	10	–	3
No. 18 Idaho ^	6	–	2	7	–	5
No. 25 UC Davis	5	–	3	6	–	5
No. 14 Montana ^	4	–	4	8	–	5
Portland State	3	–	5	4	–	7
Eastern Washington	2	–	6	3	–	8
Northern Colorado	2	–	6	3	–	8
Northern Arizona	2	–	6	3	–	8
Idaho State	1	–	7	1	–	10
Cal Poly	1	–	7	2	–	9
+ – Conference co-champions; ^ – FCS playoff participant; Rankings from STATS Poll

The 2022 Cal Poly Mustangs football team represented California Polytechnic State University, San Luis Obispo as member of the Big Sky Conference during the 2022 NCAA Division I FCS football season. Led by Beau Baldwin in his third and final season as head coach, the Mustangs compiled an overall record of 2–9 with a mark of 1–7 in conference play, tying for 11th place in the Big Sky. Cal poly played home games at Mustang Stadium in San Luis Obispo, California.

== Schedule ==
Date	Time	Opponent	Site	TV	Result	Attendance
September 2	7:30 p.m.	at Fresno State*	Bulldog Stadium; Fresno, CA	FS1	L 7–35	36,011
September 10	2:05 p.m.	San Diego*	Alex G. Spanos Stadium; San Luis Obispo, CA	ESPN+	W 28–27	6,782
September 17	11:00 a.m.	at South Dakota*	DakotaDome; Vermillion, SD	ESPN+	L 21–38	6,812
October 1	5:05 p.m.	No. 5 Sacramento State^{†}	Alex G. Spanos Stadium; San Luis Obispo, CA	ESPN+	L 21–49	8,184
October 8	1:00 p.m.	at Northern Arizona	Walkup Skydome; Flagstaff, AZ	ESPN+	L 29–31	9,417
October 15	12:05 p.m.	at Idaho State	Holt Arena; Pocatello, ID	ESPN+	L 31–40	5,921
October 22	5:05 p.m.	Eastern Washington	Alex G. Spanos Stadium; San Luis Obispo, CA	ESPN+	L 10–17	8,357
October 29	4:00 p.m.	at UC Davis	UC Davis Health Stadium; Davis, CA (Battle for the Golden Horseshoe)	ESPN+	L 17–59	8,189
November 5	5:00 p.m.	at No. 16 Montana	Washington–Grizzly Stadium; Missoula, MT	ESPN+	L 0–57	25,684
November 12	5:05 p.m.	No. 3 Montana State	Mustang Memorial Field; San Luis Obispo, CA	ESPN+	L 28–72	5,369
November 19	5:05 p.m.	Portland State	Mustang Memorial Field; San Luis Obispo, CA	ESPN+	W 49–42	5,168
*Non-conference game; ^{†}Homecoming; Rankings from STATS Poll released prior to the game; All times are in Pacific time

== Preseason ==
=== Polls ===
On July 25, 2022, during the virtual Big Sky Kickoff, the Mustangs were predicted to finish tenth in the Big Sky by both the coaches and media.

=== Preseason All–Big Sky team ===
The Mustangs did not have any players selected to the preseason all-Big Sky team.

== Game summaries ==
=== At Fresno State ===
Game One – Cal Poly Mustangs (0–0) at Fresno State Bulldogs (0–0)

Quarter	1	2	3	4	Total
Mustangs	0	7	0	0	7
Bulldogs	21	0	7	7	35

at Bulldog Stadium • Fresno, CA

- Date: Thursday, September 1, 2022
- Game time: 7:30 p.m. PST
- Game weather: Sunny • Temperature: 102 °F (39 °C) • Wind: NW 10 mph
- Game attendance: 36,011
- Referee: Christian Watson
- TV announcers (FS1): Eric Collins (play-by-play) & Devin Gardner (analyst)

Game information

First quarter

- (8:37) FRES – Jordan Mims 1-yard run, Abraham Montano kick (Drive: 9 plays, 68 yards, 4:40; Fresno State 7–0)
- (3:54) FRES – Nikko Remigio 13-yard run, Abraham Montano kick (Drive: 9 plays, 93 yards, 3:49; Fresno State 14–0)
- (0:29) FRES – Jordan Mims 1-yard run, Abraham Montano kick (Drive: 6 plays, 75 yards, 2:06; Fresno State 21–0)

Second quarter

- (11:54) CP – Bryson Allen 9-yard pass from Jaden Jones, Jaden Ohlsen kick (Drive: 9 plays, 75 yards, 3:35; Fresno State 21–7)

Third quarter

- (8:53) FRES – Jordan Mims 18-yard pass from Jake Haener, Abraham Montano kick (Drive: 3 plays, 34 yards, 1:05; Fresno State 28–7)

Fourth quarter

- (8:53) FRES – Raymond Pauwels 8-yard pass from Jake Haener, Abraham Montano kick (Drive: 16 plays, 95 yards, 6:52; Fresno State 35–7)

Statistics	CP	FRES
First downs	17	32
Plays–yards	68–317	75–549
Rushes–yards	30–106	33–175
Passing yards	211	370
Passing: comp–att–int	20–38–0	35–42–0
Time of possession	26:19	33:41

Team	Category	Player	Statistics
Cal Poly	Passing	Jaden Jones	20/38, 211 yards, TD
Cal Poly	Rushing	Jaden Jones	9 carries, 59 yards
Cal Poly	Receiving	Chris Coleman	3 receptions 74 yards
Fresno State	Passing	Jake Haener	35/41, 370 yards, 2 TD
Fresno State	Rushing	Jordan Mims	15 carries, 76 yards, 2 TD
Fresno State	Receiving	Nikko Remigio	9 receptions, 100 yards

=== San Diego ===
	1	2	3	4	Total
Toreros	7	10	7	3	27
Mustangs	0	7	7	14	28

=== At South Dakota ===
	1	2	3	4	Total
Mustangs	7	0	0	14	21
Coyotes	21	0	0	17	38

=== No. 5 Sacramento State ===
	1	2	3	4	Total
No. 5 Hornets	7	14	14	14	49
Mustangs	0	0	7	14	21

=== At Northern Arizona ===
	1	2	3	4	Total
Mustangs	6	14	0	9	29
Lumberjacks	14	7	7	3	31

=== At Idaho State ===
	1	2	3	4	Total
Mustangs	7	0	10	14	31
Bengals	14	10	13	3	40

=== Eastern Washington ===
	1	2	3	4	Total
Eagles	10	0	0	7	17
Mustangs	7	3	0	0	10

=== At UC Davis ===
	1	2	3	4	Total
Mustangs	0	17	0	0	17
Aggies	14	17	14	14	59

=== At No. 16 Montana ===
	1	2	3	4	Total
Mustangs	0	0	0	0	0
No. 16 Grizzlies	14	17	13	13	57

=== No. 3 Montana State ===
	1	2	3	4	Total
No. 3 Bobcats	24	27	14	7	72
Mustangs	0	14	14	0	28

=== Portland State ===
	1	2	3	4	Total
Vikings	14	7	0	21	42
Mustangs	0	28	7	14	49

== Roster ==
2022 Cal Poly Mustangs football team roster
Players
Coaches
Offense

Pos.	#	Name	Class
WR	0	Zedakiah Centers	So
QB	1	Kahliq Paulette	Fr
WR	2	Giancarlo Woods	So
WR	3	Xavier Moore	Sr
RB	4	Mark Biggins	Jr
WR	5	Jake Woods	So
WR	6	Chris Coleman	GS
QB	7	Conor Bruce	Sr
RB	8	Shakobe Harper	Jr
WR	9	Evan Burkhart	So
WR	10	Kai Rappola	Fr
QB	11	Jaden Jones	Fr
WR	12	Makhi Johnson	Fr
QB	13	Spencer Brasch	Jr
QB	14	Jackson Pavitt	So
QB	15	Bryce Weiner	Fr
WR	16	Logan Booher	Fr
WR	17	Bryson Allen	Jr
QB	18	Bo Kelly	Fr
RB	19	Zion Hall	Fr
RB	22	Paul Holyfield	Fr
WR	27	Ben Martin	Fr
RB	28	Troy Fletcher	Fr
TE	29	Tyrece Fairly-Diyem	Fr
TE	34	Ryan Rivera	Sr
TE	41	Seth Robasciotti	So
RB	42	Adam Garwood	So
OL	52	Payson Campisano	Jr
OL	54	Hayden Jones	Fr
OL	55	Keith Marco	Fr
OL	56	Jake Trachtman	Fr
OL	57	Ava Leota	Fr
OL	58	Garrett Weichman	GS
OL	59	Tyler Charbonneau	Fr
OL	61	Ethan Bronson	So
OL	62	Hunter Jones	Jr
OL	65	Kavika Fitisemanu	Fr
OL	69	Carson Leedom	So
OL	70	Mohab Wahdan	Jr
OL	71	Charles Lincoln	Jr
OL	72	Austin Anderson	So
OL	74	Jasdev Banwait	So
OL	76	Vatulele Finau	Sr
OL	77	Eli Otero	Sr
OL	78	Jonathan Serdinsky	So
OL	79	Ryan Hannoun	So
TE	80	Josh Cuevas	Fr
TE	81	Alex Grywalski	Fr
WR	82	Legend Waring	Fr
TE	84	DeMarcus Oandasan	So
WR	85	Michael Roth	GS
TE	89	Tyler Hoffman	Fr

Defense

Pos.	#	Name	Class
DB	0	Dylan Wyatt	Sr
DB	1	Jamarri Jackson	GS
DB	3	Tommy Griffin	So
LB	5	Je'kob Jones	Fr
DB	6	Xavier Oliphant	So
LB	7	Laipeli Palu	Sr
DB	8	Dawson Hurts	Jr
DB	9	Brian Dukes	Fr
LB	10	David Meyer	So
DB	11	Zach Hernandez	Sr
DB	12	Donovan Saunders	Fr
DB	13	Jay'Vion Cole	Fr
DL	14	Elijah Ponder	So
DE	15	Robbie Greer	So
DB	17	Isaiah Hogan	Jr
DB	18	Dominic McCormack	Fr
DB	20	Corey Thomas	Sr
DB	21	Christian Middleton	So
DB	23	Julian Reed	Jr
DL	24	Michael Otterstedt	Fr
DB	25	Jeremy Justice	So
DB	26	Jerry Huddleston	Fr
DB	27	Jake East	Fr
DL	31	Dustin Grein	Sr
DB	32	Mason Rivera	Fr
DB	33	Grady Liddell	So
DB	36	Thomas McNamara	Fr
LB	43	Judaea Moon	Jr
LB	44	Carson Jones	Fr
LB	46	Josh Henderson	So
LB	47	Connor Heffler	So
LB	48	Drew Sulick	Fr
DL	49	Julius Jordan	Fr
LB	52	Kenny Olson	Fr
DL	53	Nilasoni Finau	Fr
DL	55	Zachary Denis	Fr
DL	58	Thomas Bouda	Fr
DL	60	Ethan Rodriguez	So
DL	64	Mason Barbour	Fr
DL	83	Sky Ellis	Fr
DL	88	Jordan Sanders	Fr
DL	92	Ian Don	So
DL	94	Marcus Mifsud	So
DL	95	Antonio Vakameilalo	So
DL	97	Elijah Satcher	Fr
DL	98	John Smolenski	So
DL	99	Josh Ngaluafe	So

Special teams

Pos.	#	Name	Class
P	35	Jesse Ehrlich	Fr
P	38	Noah Serna	Fr
LS	39	Cruz Rubio	So
K	40	Thomas Lee	Sr
LS	51	Reed Mercer	So
K	63	Kevin Ryan	Fr
K	66	Bryant Thao	So
K	67	Jaden Ohlsen	So

Head coach

- Beau Baldwin

Coordinators/assistant coaches

- Will Plemons (Co-Defensive coordinator / Defensive line)
- Cody Vonappen (Co-Defensive coordinator / Defensive backs)
- Casey Petree (Co-Special Teams coordinator / Tight ends)
- Erik Meyer (Quarterbacks)
- Paul Wulff (Running game coordinator / Offensive line)
- Robbie Rouse (Running backs)
- Latef Grim (Wide receivers)
- Josh Letuligasenoa (Defense)
- Asa Jackson (Cornerbacks)
- Jake Casteel (Defensive ends)

Legend

- (C) Team captain
- (S) Suspended
- (I) Ineligible
- Injured
- Redshirt

Roster
Last update: June 29, 2022
