= 2022 Northern Arizona Lumberjacks football team =

American college football season

2022 Northern Arizona Lumberjacks football
- Conference: Big Sky Conference
- Record: 3–8 (2–6 Big Sky)
- Head coach: Chris Ball (4th season)
- Offensive coordinator: Aaron Pflugrad (5th season)
- Defensive coordinator: Jerry Partridge (4th season)
- Home stadium: Walkup Skydome

2022 Big Sky Conference football standings
	Conf.			Overall
Team	W		L	W		L
No. 4 Montana State +^	8	–	0	12	–	2
No. 5 Sacramento State +^	8	–	0	12	–	1
No. 9 Weber State ^	6	–	2	10	–	3
No. 18 Idaho ^	6	–	2	7	–	5
No. 25 UC Davis	5	–	3	6	–	5
No. 14 Montana ^	4	–	4	8	–	5
Portland State	3	–	5	4	–	7
Eastern Washington	2	–	6	3	–	8
Northern Colorado	2	–	6	3	–	8
Northern Arizona	2	–	6	3	–	8
Idaho State	1	–	7	1	–	10
Cal Poly	1	–	7	2	–	9
+ – Conference co-champions; ^ – FCS playoff participant; Rankings from STATS Poll

The 2022 Northern Arizona Lumberjacks football team represented Northern Arizona University as a member of the Big Sky Conference during the 2022 NCAA Division I FCS football season. They were led by fourth-year head coach Chris Ball and played their home games at the Walkup Skydome.

== Preseason ==
=== Polls ===
On July 25, 2022, during the virtual Big Sky Kickoff, the Lumberjacks were predicted to finish seventh in the Big Sky by the coaches and the media.

=== Preseason All–Big Sky team ===
The Lumberjacks had two players selected to the preseason all-Big Sky team.

Offense

Jonas Leader – OL

Defense

Morgan Vest – S

== Schedule ==
Date	Time	Opponent	Site	TV	Result	Attendance
September 1	7:00 p.m.	at Arizona State*	Sun Devil Stadium; Tempe, AZ	P12N	L 3–40	44,764
September 10	4:00 p.m.	at Sam Houston*	Bowers Stadium; Huntsville, TX	ESPN+	W 10–3	7,117
September 17	1:00 p.m.	No. 22 North Dakota*	Walkup Skydome; Flagstaff, AZ	ESPN+	L 24–27	7,841
September 24	1:00 p.m.	Idaho	Walkup Skydome; Flagstaff, AZ	ESPN+	L 10–27	7,022
October 1	2:05 p.m.	at Portland State	Hillsboro Stadium; Hillsboro, OR	ESPN+	L 27–35	3,595
October 8	1:00 p.m.	Cal Poly	Walkup Skydome; Flagstaff, AZ	ESPN+	W 31–29	9,417
October 15	5:00 p.m.	at UC Davis	UC Davis Health Stadium; Davis, CA	ESPN+	L 27–56	9,152
October 22	12:00 p.m.	at Idaho State	Holt Arena; Pocatello, ID	ESPN+	W 24–10	1
November 5	1:00 p.m.	No. 3 Montana State^{†}	Walkup Skydome; Flagstaff, AZ	ESPN+	L 38–41	8,676
November 12	12:00 p.m.	at Northern Colorado	Nottingham Field; Greeley, CO	ESPN+	L 20–21	3,769
November 19	1:00 p.m.	No. 7 Weber State	Walkup Skydome; Flagstaff, AZ	ESPN+	L 31–33	5,217
*Non-conference game; ^{†}Homecoming; Rankings from STATS Poll released prior to the game; All times are in Mountain time

== Game summaries ==
=== At Arizona State ===
Northern Arizona Lumberjacks vs. Arizona State Sun Devils – Game summary

Quarter	1	2	3	4	Total
Lumberjacks	0	3	0	0	3
Sun Devils	3	21	13	3	40

at Sun Devil Stadium • Tempe, AZ

- Date: September 1, 2022
- Game time: 7:07 p.m.
- Game weather: Clear, 103 °F (39 °C)
- Game attendance: 44,764
- Referee: Michael Mothershed
- TV announcers (P12N): Roxy Bernstein, Lincoln Kennedy
- -

Game information
First quarter
- ASU – Carter Brown 27-yard field goal, 8:21. ASU 3–0. Drive: 11 plays, 69 yards, 5:07.

Second quarter

- ASU – Emory Jones 1-yard run (Carter Brown kick), 8:05. ASU 10–0. Drive: 9 plays, 72 yards, 4:42.
- ASU – Xazavian Valladay 4-yard run (Carter Brown kick), 3:44. ASU 17–0. Drive: 6 plays, 75 yards, 2:39.
- ASU – Emory Jones 17-yard run (Carter Brown kick), 2:19. ASU 24–0. Drive: 2 plays, 45 yards, 0:30.
- NAU – Collin Robbins 48-yard field goal, 0:05. ASU 24–3. Drive: 4 plays, -2 yards, 0:54.

Third quarter

- ASU – Xazavian Valladay 27-yard run (Carter Brown kick), 12:32. ASU 31–3. Drive: 5 plays, 68 yards, 2:28.
- ASU – Carter Brown 36-yard field goal, 9:42. ASU 34–3. Drive: 4 plays, 6 yards, 1:16.
- ASU – Carter Brown 44-yard field goal, 0:17. ASU 37–3. Drive: 10 plays, 39 yards, 5:14.

Fourth quarter

- ASU – Carter Brown 44-yard field goal, 7:54. ASU 40–3. Drive: 10 plays, 55 yards, 5:43.

Statistics	Northern Arizona	Arizona State
First downs	7	24
Plays–yards	53–120	67–419
Rushes–yards	23–23	49–267
Passing yards	120	152
Passing: comp–att–int	20–30–2	13–18
Time of possession	23:49	36:10

Team	Category	Player	Statistics
Northern Arizona	Passing	RJ Martinez	18/28, 92 yards, 2 INT
Northern Arizona	Rushing	Draycen Hall	2 carries, 14 yards
Northern Arizona	Receiving	Coleman Owen	5 receptions, 24 yards
Arizona State	Passing	Emory Jones	13/18, 152 yards
Arizona State	Rushing	Xazavian Valladay	15 carries, 116 yards, 2 TD
Arizona State	Receiving	Messiah Swinson	3 receptions, 50 yards

=== At Sam Houston ===
	1	2	3	4	Total
Lumberjacks	0	7	3	0	10
Bearkats	0	3	0	0	3

=== No. 22 North Dakota ===
	1	2	3	4	Total
No. 22 Fighting Hawks	0	13	0	14	27
Lumberjacks	7	7	0	10	24

=== Idaho ===
	1	2	3	4	Total
Vandals	7	10	3	7	27
Lumberjacks	7	3	0	0	10

=== At Portland State ===
	1	2	3	4	Total
Lumberjacks	7	0	0	20	27
Vikings	14	14	0	7	35

=== Cal Poly ===
	1	2	3	4	Total
Mustangs	6	14	0	9	29
Lumberjacks	14	7	7	3	31

=== At UC Davis ===
	1	2	3	4	Total
Lumberjacks	6	0	14	7	27
Aggies	7	28	21	0	56

=== At Idaho State ===
	1	2	3	4	Total
Lumberjacks	3	14	7	0	24
Bengals	0	7	0	3	10

=== No. 3 Montana State ===
	1	2	3	4	Total
No. 3 Bobcats	17	0	7	17	41
Lumberjacks	7	14	7	10	38

=== At Northern Colorado ===
	1	2	3	4	Total
Lumberjacks	7	3	0	10	20
Bears	3	0	10	8	21

=== No. 7 Weber State ===
	1	2	3	4	Total
No. 7 Wildcats	14	7	6	6	33
Lumberjacks	0	21	0	10	31
