= 2022 Eastern Washington Eagles football team =

American college football season

2022 Eastern Washington Eagles football
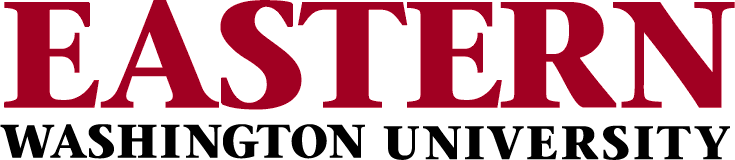
- Conference: Big Sky Conference
- Record: 3–8 (2–6 Big Sky)
- Head coach: Aaron Best (6th season)
- Offensive coordinator: Jim Chapin (1st season)
- Defensive coordinator: Jeff Copp (1st season)
- Home stadium: Roos Field

2022 Big Sky Conference football standings
	Conf.			Overall
Team	W		L	W		L
No. 4 Montana State +^	8	–	0	12	–	2
No. 5 Sacramento State +^	8	–	0	12	–	1
No. 9 Weber State ^	6	–	2	10	–	3
No. 18 Idaho ^	6	–	2	7	–	5
No. 25 UC Davis	5	–	3	6	–	5
No. 14 Montana ^	4	–	4	8	–	5
Portland State	3	–	5	4	–	7
Eastern Washington	2	–	6	3	–	8
Northern Colorado	2	–	6	3	–	8
Northern Arizona	2	–	6	3	–	8
Idaho State	1	–	7	1	–	10
Cal Poly	1	–	7	2	–	9
+ – Conference co-champions; ^ – FCS playoff participant; Rankings from STATS Poll

The 2022 Eastern Washington Eagles football team represented Eastern Washington University as a member of the Big Sky Conference during the 2022 NCAA Division I FCS football season. Led by sixth-year head coach Aaron Best, the Eagles played their home games at Roos Field in Cheney, Washington.

== Preseason ==
=== Polls ===
On July 25, 2022, during the virtual Big Sky Kickoff, the Eagles were predicted to finish sixth in the Big Sky by both the coaches and media.

=== Preseason All–Big Sky team ===
The Eagles had two players selected to the preseason all-Big Sky team.

Offense

Efton Chism III – WR

Defense

Joshua Jerome – DL

== Roster ==
2022 Eastern Washington Eagles football team roster
Players
Coaches
Offense

Pos.	#	Name	Class
WR	1	Freddie Roberson	Jr
QB	2	Gunner Talkington	Sr
WR	3	Anthony Stell Jr.	Jr
QB	6	Trey Turner	So
WR	9	Robert Mason III	Sr
WR	10	Josh Johnson	Fr
WR	11	Jakobie James	So
QB	12	Simon Burkett	Jr
WR	12	Wesley Garrett	Fr
QB	16	Kekoa Visperas	Fr
WR	16	Miles Williams	Fr
WR	17	Nolan Ulm	So
WR	18	Jaelin Gree	Fr
QB	18	Ryan Kelley	Sr
RB	19	Isaiah Lewis	Jr
RB	22	Justice Jackson	So
RB	23	Micah Smith	Jr
RB	24	Silas Perreiah	So
RB	32	Tuna Altahir	Fr
WR	35	Woodley Downard	Fr
RB	36	Nick Adimora	Fr
TE	39	Austin York	Jr
RB	43	Brandon Montoya	Fr
RB	45	Davante Smith	Fr
OL	51	Andrei Leonardi	Sr
OL	52	Isaac Flemmer	So
OL	57	Luke Dahlgren	So
OL	61	Wyatt Hansen	So
OL	64	Brenden Rivera	So
OL	66	Gale Kamp	So
OL	67	Dane Anderson	Fr
OL	68	Seth Carnahan	Jr
OL	70	Matthew Hewa Baddege	So
OL	72	Shane Schwake	Fr
OL	73	Tony Ortega	Fr
OL	74	Bret Fullington	Fr
OL	75	Brad Prestegord	Jr
OL	76	Brad Godwin	Jr
OL	77	Wyatt Musser	Sr
OL	79	Dylan Conner	Fr
TE	80	Messiah Jones	Fr
TE	81	Aiden Nellor	Jr
TE	82	Blake Gobel	So
TE	85	Jett Carpenter	Fr
TE	86	Dylan Ingram	Sr
WR	87	Malaki Roberson	So
WR	88	Isaiah Howard	Fr
WR	89	Efton Chism III	So
WR	91	Korey Bozovich	Fr
TE	92	Chris Johnson	So
TE	97	Tariq May	Fr

Defense

Pos.	#	Name	Class
DL	0	Debore'ae McClain	Sr
DB	4	Anthany Smith	Sr
DL	5	Mitchell Johnson	Sr
DB	7	Tre Weed	Jr
DB	8	Darrien Sampson	Jr
DL	13	LeAndre Gaines	So
DB	20	Marlon Jones Jr.	So
DB	21	Keshaun King	Sr
DB	25	Ely Doyle	Jr
S	26	Bryce Brown-Johnson	Fr
DB	27	DaJean Wells	So
S	28	Drew Carter	Fr
DB	29	Cage Schenck	So
DB	30	Joseph Obeto	Fr
DB	31	Demetrius Crosby Jr.	Jr
LB	33	Derek Tommasini	Jr
DB	34	Kentrell Williams Jr.	Fr
CB	35	Amani Pressley	Fr
DB	38	Armani Orange	Fr
LB	40	Danien Tuameopeau	Fr
LB	41	Steven Flowers	So
DL	44	Brock Harrison	So
LB	46	Conner O'Farrell	So
LB	48	Trevor Thurman	So
DL	50	Emmanuel Osuoha	Jr
LB	52	Elijah Rodriguez	Fr
LB	53	Shane Aleaga	Fr
DL	55	Joshua Jerome	Sr
DL	56	Taalefili Fata	So
LB	58	Ahmani Williams	So
DL	59	Robert Cooper	So
LB	59	Myles Mayovsky	Fr
DL	63	Chad Vidican	Fr
DT	78	Justin La'ulu	Fr
DL	90	Matthew Brown	So
DL	91	Warren Hardin	So
DL	93	Sean Skladany	Fr
DL	93	Sandrey Mitberg	Fr
DL	95	Gabriel Johnson	Fr
DL	96	Jacob Newsom	So
DL	98	Soli Paleso'o	So
DL	99	Caleb Davis	Sr

Special teams

Pos.	#	Name	Class
K	14	Jackson Cleaver	So
K, P	15	Wyatt Hawkins	So
LS	47	Cody Clements	Sr
K, P	49	Nick Kokich	Jr
LS	60	Jackson Plieth	Fr
LS	62	Aaron Estrada	So
K, P	83	Seth Harrison	Jr

Head coach

- Aaron Best

Coordinators/assistant coaches

- Jim Chapin (Offensive coordinator / Quarterbacks)
- Jeff Copp (Defensive coordinator)
- Marc Anderson (Tight ends)
- Jase Butorac (Offensive line)
- Zach Bruce (Safeties)
- Greg Hardin (Wide receivers)
- Aaron Prier (Running backs)
- Matt Ulrich (Defensive line)
- Justin Mullgrav (Linebackers)
- Wes Nurse (Cornerbacks)

Legend

- (C) Team captain
- (S) Suspended
- (I) Ineligible
- Injured
- Redshirt

2022 Roster
Last update: June 29, 2022

== Schedule ==
Date	Time	Opponent	Rank	Site	TV	Result	Attendance
September 3	1:00 p.m.	Tennessee State*	No. 13	Roos Field; Cheney, WA	ESPN+	W 36–29	3,932
September 10	5:30 p.m.	at Oregon*	No. 12	Autzen Stadium; Eugene, OR	P12N	L 14–70	47,289
September 24	1:00 p.m.	No. 4T Montana State	No. 15	Roos Field; Cheney, WA	ESPN+	L 35–38	7,200
October 2 (Note: The Florida game was moved back by one day due to Hurricane Ian.)	9:00 a.m.	at Florida*	No. 20	Ben Hill Griffin Stadium; Gainesville, FL	SECN+/ESPN+	L 17–52	72,462
October 8	5:00 p.m.	at No. 7 Weber State	No. 24	Stewart Stadium; Ogden, UT	ESPN+	L 21–45	10,724
October 15	4:00 p.m.	No. 5 Sacramento State^{†}		Roos Field; Cheney, WA	ESPN+	L 28–52	6,276
October 22	5:00 p.m.	at Cal Poly		Alex G. Spanos Stadium; San Luis Obispo, CA	ESPN+	W 17–10	8,357
October 29	1:00 p.m.	Portland State		Roos Field; Cheney, WA (The Dam Cup)	ESPN+	L 35–38	4,143
November 5	12:00 p.m.	at No. 15 Idaho		Kibbie Dome; Moscow, ID	ESPN+	L 16–48	11,811
November 12	12:00 p.m.	at No. 16 Montana		Washington–Grizzly Stadium; Missoula, MT (EWU–UM Governors Cup)	ESPN+	L 7–63	25,403
November 19	1:00 p.m.	Northern Colorado		Roos Field; Cheney, WA	ESPN+	W 45–21	4,099
*Non-conference game; ^{†}Homecoming; Rankings from STATS Poll released prior to the game; All times are in Pacific time

== Game summaries ==
=== Tennessee State ===
	1	2	3	4	Total
Tigers	19	0	0	10	29
No. 13 Eagles	15	14	0	7	36

=== At Oregon ===
Eastern Washington Eagles (1–0) vs Oregon Ducks (0–1) – Game summary

Quarter	1	2	3	4	Total
No. 12 Eagles	0	7	7	0	14
Ducks	14	28	21	7	70

at Autzen Stadium • Eugene, OR

- Date: September 10, 2022
- Game time: 5:30 p.m.
- Game weather: Sunny, 75 °F (24 °C)
- Game attendance: 47,289
- Referee: Chris Coyte
- TV announcers (Pac-12 Network): Ted Robinson (play-by-play), Yogi Roth (analyst)

Game information

First Quarter

- (9:27) ORE – Terrance Ferguson 13-yard pass from Bo Nix, Camden Lewis kick (Drive: 9 plays, 45 yards, 4:09; Oregon 7–0)
- (4:52) ORE – Noah Whittington 5-yard run, Camden Lewis kick (Drive: 9 plays, 72 yards, 3:34; Oregon 14–0)

Second Quarter

- (14:08) ORE – Terrance Ferguson 19-yard pass from Bo Nix, Camden Lewis kick (Drive: 10 plays, 83 yards, 4:31; Oregon 21–0)
- (10:10) ORE – Bucky Irving 1-yard run, Camden Lewis kick (Drive: 9 plays, 44 yards, 3:40; Oregon 28–0)
- (6:03) EWU – Jett Carpenter 7-yard pass from Gunner Talkington, Jackson Cleaver kick (Drive: 9 plays, 38 yards, 3:56; Oregon 28–7)
- (3:14) ORE – Byron Cardwell 13-yard pass from Bo Nix, Camden Lewis kick (Drive: 7 plays, 72 yards, 2:43; Oregon 35–7)
- (0:00) ORE – Troy Franklin 7-yard pass from Bo Nix, Camden Lewis kick (Drive: 9 plays, 65 yards, 2:20; Oregon 42–7)

Third Quarter

- (11:31) ORE– Cam McCormick 2-yard pass from Bo Nix, Camden Lewis kick (Drive: 8 plays, 75 yards, 3:29; Oregon 49–7)
- (11:18) ORE – Casey Rogers 0-yard fumble return, Camden Lewis kick (Drive: 1 plays, 0 yards, 0:00; Oregon 56–7)
- (5:38) ORE – Byron Cardwell 10-yard run, Camden Lewis kick (Drive: 9 plays, 78 yards, 3:10; Oregon 63–7)
- (2:18) EWU – Freddie Roberson 15-yard pass from Gunner Talkington, Jackson Cleaver kick (Drive: 10 plays, 73 yards, 3:11; Oregon 63–14)

Fourth Quarter

- (12:07) ORE – Kilohana Haasenritter 6-yard run, Camden Lewis kick (Drive: 11 plays, 76 yards, 5:03; Oregon 70–14)

Statistics	EWU	ORE
First downs	11	40
Total yards	187	604
Rushes/yards	28–100	48–263
Passing yards	87	341
Passing: Comp–Att–Int	12–23–2	34–41–0
Time of possession	21:05	38:55

Team	Category	Player	Statistics
Eastern Washington	Passing	Gunner Talkington	12/21, 87 yards, 2 TD, 2 INT
Eastern Washington	Rushing	Micah Smith	7 carries, 27 yards
Eastern Washington	Receiving	Freddie Roberson	3 receptions, 33 yards, TD
Oregon	Passing	Bo Nix	28/33, 277 yards, 5 TD
Oregon	Rushing	Bucky Irving	8 carries, 74 yards, TD
Oregon	Receiving	Troy Franklin	10 receptions, 84 yards, TD

=== No. 4т Montana State ===
	1	2	3	4	Total
No. 4T Bobcats	10	14	7	7	38
No. 15 Eagles	14	7	0	14	35

=== At Florida ===
Eastern Washington Eagles (1–2) at Florida Gators (2–2) – Game summary

Quarter	1	2	3	4	Total
No. 20 (FCS) Eastern Washington	3	0	0	14	17
Florida	14	21	10	7	52

at Ben Hill Griffin Stadium • Gainesville, FL

- Date: October 2, 2022
- Game time: 12:00 p.m. EDT
- Game weather: Temperature: 75 °F (24 °C) • Wind: NW at 2 miles per hour (3.2 km/h) • Weather: Sunny
- Game attendance: 72,462
- Referee: James Carter
- TV announcers (ESPN+/SECN+): Drew Carter (play-by-play), Aaron Murray (color), Monica Uber (sideline reporter)

Game information

First quarter

- Eastern Washington – Seth Harrison 44-yard field goal, 8:04
- Florida – Justin Shorter 75-yard pass from Anthony Richardson (Adam Mihalek kick), 7:53
- Florida – Montrell Johnson Jr. 3-yard run (Adam Mihalek kick), 1:13

Second quarter

- Florida – Nay'Quan Wright 4-yard (Adam Mihalek kick), 9:22
- Florida – Ricky Pearsall 76-yard run (Adam Mihalek kick), 5:48
- Florida – Xzavier Henderson 21-yard pass from Anthony Richardson (Adam Mihalek kick), 3:02

Third quarter

- Florida – Adam Mihalek 36-yard field goal, 7:47
- Florida – Caleb Douglas 62-yard pass from Jalen Kitna (Adam Mihalek kick), 4:25

Fourth quarter

- Florida – Lorenzo Lingard 11-yard run (Adam Mihalek kick), 11:53
- Eastern Washington – Jakobie James 28-yard pass from Gunner Talkington (Seth Harrison kick), 8:35
- Eastern Washington – Kekoa Visperas 25-yard run (Seth Harrison kick), 3:17

Passing leaders

- Eastern Washington – Gunner Talkington – 24/37, 250 yards, 1 touchdown
- Florida – Anthony Richardson – 8/10, 240 yards, 2 touchdowns, 1 interception

Rushing leaders

- Eastern Washington – Tuna Altahir – 15 carries, 48 yards
- Florida – Ricky Pearsall – 1 carry, 76 yards, 1 touchdown

Receiving leaders

- Eastern Washington – Freddie Roberson – 4 receptions, 62 yards
- Florida – Justin Shorter – 1 reception, 75 yards, 1 touchdown

Tackling leaders

- Eastern Washington – Sherwin King Jr. – 6 tackles
- Florida – Rashad Torrence II – 10 tackles

=== At No. 7 Weber State ===
	1	2	3	4	Total
No. 24 Eagles	7	7	7	0	21
No. 7 Wildcats	14	7	10	14	45

=== No. 5 Sacramento State ===
	1	2	3	4	Total
No. 5 Hornets	21	14	10	7	52
Eagles	0	21	7	0	28

=== At Cal Poly ===
	1	2	3	4	Total
Eagles	10	0	0	7	17
Mustangs	7	3	0	0	10

=== Portland State ===
	1	2	3	4	Total
Vikings	21	14	0	3	38
Eagles	0	7	7	21	35

=== At No. 15 Idaho ===
	1	2	3	4	Total
Eagles	3	7	0	6	16
No. 15 Vandals	7	28	3	10	48

=== At No. 16 Montana ===
	1	2	3	4	Total
Eagles	0	0	7	0	7
No. 16 Grizzlies	21	21	14	7	63

=== Northern Colorado ===
	1	2	3	4	Total
Bears	0	14	7	0	21
Eagles	7	14	14	10	45

== Ranking movements ==
Ranking movements Legend: ██ Increase in ranking ██ Decrease in ranking RV = Received votes
	Week													
Poll	Pre	1	2	3	4	5	6	7	8	9	10	11	12	Final
STATS	13	12	14	15	20	24	RV							
Coaches	12	11	15	15	18	21	RV							
