= 2022 Portland State Vikings football team =

American college football season

2022 Portland State Vikings football
- Conference: Big Sky Conference
- Record: 4–7 (3–5 Big Sky)
- Head coach: Bruce Barnum (8th season)
- Offensive coordinator: Skyler Fulton (1st season)
- Offensive scheme: Pro spread
- Defensive coordinator: Payam Saadat (5th season)
- Base defense: 3–3–5 or 4–2–5
- Home stadium: Hillsboro Stadium

2022 Big Sky Conference football standings
| | Conf. | | | Overall |
| Team | W | | L | W | | L |
|---|---|---|---|---|---|---|
| No. 4 Montana State +^ | 8 | – | 0 | 12 | – | 2 |
| No. 5 Sacramento State +^ | 8 | – | 0 | 12 | – | 1 |
| No. 9 Weber State ^ | 6 | – | 2 | 10 | – | 3 |
| No. 18 Idaho ^ | 6 | – | 2 | 7 | – | 5 |
| No. 25 UC Davis | 5 | – | 3 | 6 | – | 5 |
| No. 14 Montana ^ | 4 | – | 4 | 8 | – | 5 |
| Portland State | 3 | – | 5 | 4 | – | 7 |
| Eastern Washington | 2 | – | 6 | 3 | – | 8 |
| Northern Colorado | 2 | – | 6 | 3 | – | 8 |
| Northern Arizona | 2 | – | 6 | 3 | – | 8 |
| Idaho State | 1 | – | 7 | 1 | – | 10 |
| Cal Poly | 1 | – | 7 | 2 | – | 9 |
+ – Conference co-champions; ^ – FCS playoff participant; Rankings from STATS Poll

The 2022 Portland State Vikings football team represented Portland State University as a member of the Big Sky Conference during the 2022 NCAA Division I FCS football season. Led by eighth-year head coach Bruce Barnum, the Vikings played their home games off campus at Hillsboro Stadium in Hillsboro, Oregon, a suburb west of Portland.

== Preseason ==
=== Polls ===
On July 25, 2022, during the virtual Big Sky Kickoff, the Vikings were predicted to finish in the Big Sky ninth by the coaches and eighth by the media.

=== Preseason All–Big Sky team ===
The Vikings had three players selected to the preseason all-Big Sky team.

Offense

Beau Kelly – WR

Defense

Anthony Adams – S

VJ Malo – DT

== Schedule ==
| Date | Time | Opponent | Site | TV | Result | Attendance |
|---|---|---|---|---|---|---|
| September 1 | 7:30 p.m. | at San Jose State* | CEFCU Stadium; San Jose, CA | NBCSBA | L 17–21 | 16,291 |
| September 10 | 1:00 p.m. | at Washington* | Husky Stadium; Seattle, WA | P12N | L 6–52 | 57,518 |
| September 24 | 1:00 p.m. | at No. T–2 Montana | Washington–Grizzly Stadium; Missoula, MT | ESPN+ | L 16–53 | 12,345 |
| October 1 | 2:00 p.m. | Northern Arizona^{†} | Hillsboro Stadium; Hillsboro, OR | ESPN+ | W 35–27 | 3,595 |
| October 8 | 2:00 p.m. | Lincoln (CA)* | Hillsboro Stadium; Hillsboro, OR | KRCW/ESPN+ | W 48–6 | 2,921 |
| October 15 | 2:00 p.m. | No. 6 Weber State | Hillsboro Stadium; Hillsboro, OR | ESPN+ | L 7–42 | 4,067 |
| October 22 | 12:00 p.m. | at No. 17 Idaho | Kibbie Dome; Moscow, ID | ESPN+ | L 21–56 | 7,357 |
| October 29 | 1:00 p.m. | at Eastern Washington | Roos Field; Cheney, WA (The Dam Cup) | ESPN+ | W 38–35 | 4,143 |
| November 5 | 2:00 p.m. | Northern Colorado | Hillsboro Stadium; Hillsboro, OR | ESPN+ | W 35–21 | 2,771 |
| November 11 | 7:00 p.m. | No. 2 Sacramento State | Hillsboro Stadium; Hillsboro, OR | ESPN+ | L 17–45 | 2,891 |
| November 19 | 5:00 p.m. | at Cal Poly | Alex G. Spanos Stadium; San Luis Obispo, CA | ESPN+ | L 42–49 | 5,168 |
*Non-conference game; ^{†}Homecoming; Rankings from STATS Poll released prior to the game; All times are in Pacific time

== Game summaries ==
=== At San Jose State ===
| | 1 | 2 | 3 | 4 | Total |
|---|---|---|---|---|---|
| Vikings | 7 | 0 | 3 | 7 | 17 |
| Spartans | 7 | 7 | 0 | 7 | 21 |

=== At Washington ===
Portland State Vikings (0–1) at Washington Huskies (1–0) – Game summary

| Quarter | 1 | 2 | 3 | 4 | Total |
|---|---|---|---|---|---|
| Vikings | 0 | 3 | 3 | 0 | 6 |
| Huskies | 14 | 17 | 14 | 7 | 52 |

at Husky Stadium • Seattle, WA

- Date: September 10, 2022
- Game time: 1:00 P.M PDT
- Game weather: 86 °F (30 °C); Sunny
- Game attendance: 57,518
- Referee: Jim Wharrie
- TV announcers (Pac-12 Network): Elise Woodward (play-by-play), Max Browne (analyst)

Game information

First quarter

- (8:10) WASH – Cameron Davis 13-yard run, Peyton Henry kick (Drive: 10 plays, 77 yards, 4:34; Washington 7–0)
- (2:41) WASH – Ja'Lynn Polk 12-yard pass from Michael Penix Jr., Peyton Henry kick (Drive: 10 plays, 74 yards, 3:51; Washington 14–0)

Second quarter

- (9:51) WASH – Jalen McMillan 84-yard pass from Michael Penix Jr., Peyton Henry kick (Drive: 3 plays, 99 yards, 1:24; Washington 21–0)
- (4:44) PSU – Gianni Smith 23-yard field goal (Drive: 12 plays, 69 yards, 5:07; Washington 21–3)
- (2:13) WASH – Wayne Taulapapa 6-yard run, Peyton Henry kick (Drive: 5 plays, 46 yards, 2:28; Washington 28–3)
- (0:00) WASH – Peyton Henry 32-yard field goal (Drive: 5 plays, 46 yards, 0:34; Washington 31–3)

Third quarter

- (12:18) WASH – Will Nixon 4-yard run, Peyton Henry kick (Drive: 6 plays, 80 yards, 2:37; Washington 38–3)
- (7:43) PSU – Gianni Smith 40-yard field goal (Drive: 8 plays, 52 yards, 4:35; Washington 38–6)
- (2:28) WASH – Cameron Davis 5-yard run, Peyton Henry kick (Drive: 10 plays, 65 yards, 5:09; Washington 45–6)

Fourth quarter

- (5:12) WASH – Denzel Boston 2-yard run, Peyton Henry kick (Drive: 7 plays, 47 yards, 4:21; Washington 52–6)

| Statistics | PSU | WASH |
|---|---|---|
| First downs | 12 | 32 |
| Plays–yards | 51–131 | 73–617 |
| Rushes–yards | 31–81 | 40–241 |
| Passing yards | 50 | 376 |
| Passing: comp–att–int | 7–20–0 | 23–33–1 |
| Time of possession | 27:21 | 32:39 |

| Team | Category | Player | Statistics |
|---|---|---|---|
| Portland State | Passing | Dante Chachere | 6/17, 50 yards |
| Portland State | Rushing | Jalynnee McGee | 12 carries, 58 yards |
| Portland State | Receiving | Nate Bennett | 3 receptions, 25 yards |
| Washington | Passing | Michael Penix Jr. | 20/27, 337 yards, 2 TD, INT |
| Washington | Rushing | Wayne Taulapapa | 12 carries, 94 yards, TD |
| Washington | Receiving | Jalen McMillan | 4 receptions, 127 yards, TD |

=== At No. 2 Montana ===
| | 1 | 2 | 3 | 4 | Total |
|---|---|---|---|---|---|
| Vikings | 7 | 7 | 2 | 0 | 16 |
| #2 Grizzlies | 14 | 25 | 0 | 14 | 53 |

=== Northern Arizona ===
| | 1 | 2 | 3 | 4 | Total |
|---|---|---|---|---|---|
| Lumberjacks | 7 | 0 | 0 | 20 | 27 |
| Vikings | 14 | 14 | 0 | 7 | 35 |

=== Lincoln (CA) ===
| | 1 | 2 | 3 | 4 | Total |
|---|---|---|---|---|---|
| Oaklanders | 0 | 0 | 0 | 6 | 6 |
| Vikings | 7 | 28 | 13 | 0 | 48 |

=== No. 6 Weber State ===
| | 1 | 2 | 3 | 4 | Total |
|---|---|---|---|---|---|
| #6 Wildcats | 14 | 7 | 14 | 7 | 42 |
| Vikings | 0 | 0 | 0 | 7 | 7 |

=== At No. 17 Idaho ===
| | 1 | 2 | 3 | 4 | Total |
|---|---|---|---|---|---|
| Vikings | 14 | 7 | 0 | 0 | 21 |
| #17 Vandals | 14 | 7 | 14 | 21 | 56 |

=== At Eastern Washington ===
| | 1 | 2 | 3 | 4 | Total |
|---|---|---|---|---|---|
| Vikings | 21 | 14 | 0 | 3 | 38 |
| Eagles | 0 | 7 | 7 | 21 | 35 |

=== Northern Colorado ===
| | 1 | 2 | 3 | 4 | Total |
|---|---|---|---|---|---|
| Bears | 0 | 28 | 7 | 0 | 35 |
| Vikings | 14 | 0 | 0 | 7 | 21 |

=== No. 2 Sacramento State ===
| | 1 | 2 | 3 | 4 | Total |
|---|---|---|---|---|---|
| #2 Hornets | 7 | 17 | 14 | 7 | 45 |
| Vikings | 0 | 0 | 3 | 14 | 17 |

=== At Cal Poly ===
| | 1 | 2 | 3 | 4 | Total |
|---|---|---|---|---|---|
| Vikings | 14 | 7 | 0 | 21 | 42 |
| Mustangs | 0 | 28 | 7 | 14 | 49 |
