= 2022 Tarleton State Texans football team =

American college football season

2022 Tarleton State Texans football
- Conference: Western Athletic Conference
- Record: 6–5 (1–3 WAC)
- Head coach: Todd Whitten (13th season)
- Offensive scheme: Spread option
- Defensive coordinator: Tyrone Nix (1st season)
- Base defense: 4–3
- Home stadium: Memorial Stadium

2022 Western Athletic Conference football standings
	Conf.			Overall
Team	W		L	W		L
Stephen F. Austin +	3	–	1	6	–	5
Abilene Christian +	3	–	1	7	–	4
Sam Houston *	3	–	2	5	–	4
Utah Tech *	2	–	2	4	–	7
Tarleton State *	1	–	3	6	–	5
Southern Utah	1	–	3	5	–	6
+ – Conference co-champions; * Note: Sam Houston ineligible for WAC championship and FCS postseason play due to start of transition to FBS; Tarleton and Utah Tech ineligible for FCS postseason play due to transition from NCAA Division II.; Rankings from STATS Poll

The 2022 Tarleton State Texans football team represented Tarleton State University as a member of the Western Athletic Conference (WAC) during the 2022 NCAA Division I FCS football season. They were led by head coach Todd Whitten, who was coaching his thirteenth season overall with the program. The Texans played their home games at Memorial Stadium in Stephenville, Texas.

== Schedule ==
Tarleton State finalized their 2022 schedule on January 14, 2022. The Texans will not play Utah Tech (formally Dixie State), due to prior scheduling commitments.

Date	Time	Opponent	Site	TV	Result	Attendance
September 1	7:00 p.m.	Mississippi Valley State*	Memorial Stadium; Stephenville, TX	ESPN+	W 29–13	10,127
September 10	7:00 p.m.	at TCU*	Amon G. Carter Stadium; Fort Worth, TX	ESPN+	L 17–59	43,197
September 17	6:00 p.m.	Eastern New Mexico*	Memorial Stadium; Stephenville, TX	ESPN+	W 41–6	13,187
September 24	6:00 p.m.	at North Alabama*	Braly Municipal Stadium; Florence, AL	ESPN+	W 43–28	10,039
October 8	7:00 p.m.	at Southern Utah	Eccles Coliseum; Cedar City, UT	ESPN+	W 42–40	4,132
October 15	4:00 p.m.	at Stephen F. Austin	Homer Bryce Stadium; Nacogdoches, TX	ESPN+	L 24–41	7,035
October 22	7:00 p.m.	Southwest Baptist*	Memorial Stadium; Stephenville, TX	ESPN+	W 24–10	11,086
October 29	7:00 p.m.	Sam Houston^{†}	Memorial Stadium; Stephenville, TX	ESPN+	L 21–40	20,237
November 5	7:00 p.m.	Abilene Christian	Memorial Stadium; Stephenville, TX	ESPN+	L 23–28	9,359
November 12	2:00 p.m.	at Utah Tech	Greater Zion Stadium; St. George, UT	ESPN+	L 28–34	2,259
November 19	2:00 p.m.	Houston Christian*	Memorial Stadium; Stephenville, TX	ESPN+	W 49–7	8,121
*Non-conference game; ^{†}Homecoming; All times are in Central time

== Game summaries ==
=== Mississippi Valley State ===
	1	2	3	4	Total
Delta Devils	0	0	7	6	13
Texans	7	9	3	10	29

=== At TCU ===
Tarleton State Texans (1-0) vs TCU Horned Frogs (1-0, 0-0)

Quarter	1	2	3	4	Total
Texans	0	7	10	0	17
Horned Frogs	21	17	14	7	59

at Amon G. Carter Stadium • Fort Worth, Texas

- Date: September 10
- Game time: 7:00 p.m. CST
- Game weather: Temperature: 88 °F (31 °C) • Wind: NE at 7 miles per hour (11 km/h) • Weather: Sunny
- Game attendance: 43,197
- Referee: David Alvarez
- TV announcers (ESPN+): Mark Neely, Charles Arbuckle

Game information

1st Quarter
2nd Quarter
3rd Quarter
4th Quarter

Statistics	Tarleton State	TCU
First downs	13	28
Total yards	295	630
Rushes/yards	28-85	37-180
Passing yards	210	450
Passing: Comp–Att–Int	11-26-2	28-34-0
Time of possession	25:18	34:42

Team	Category	Player	Statistics
Tarleton State	Passing	Beau Allen	11/25, 210 yards, TD, 2 INT
Tarleton State	Rushing	Braelon Bridges	9 carries, 32 yards
Tarleton State	Receiving	Darius Cooper	6 receptions, 117 yards, TD
TCU	Passing	Max Duggan	23/29, 390 yards, 5 TD
TCU	Rushing	Kendre Miller	13 carries, 56 yards, TD
TCU	Receiving	Jordan Hudson	5 receptions, 76 yards, TD

=== Eastern New Mexico ===
	1	2	3	4	Total
Greyhounds	3	0	3	0	6
Texans	10	14	10	7	41

=== At North Alabama ===
	1	2	3	4	Total
Texans	6	14	14	9	43
Lions	14	7	0	7	28

=== At Southern Utah ===
	1	2	3	4	Total
Texans	0	14	21	7	42
Thunderbirds	0	10	3	27	40

=== At Stephen F. Austin ===
	1	2	3	4	Total
Texans	0	10	7	7	24
Lumberjacks	7	7	10	17	41

=== Southwest Baptist ===
	1	2	3	4	Total
Bearcats	7	0	0	3	10
Texans	7	3	7	7	24

=== Sam Houston ===
	1	2	3	4	Total
Bearkats	14	6	3	17	40
Texans	7	0	0	14	21

=== Abilene Christian ===
	1	2	3	4	Total
Wildcats	7	7	0	14	28
Texans	7	3	7	6	23

Statistics	ACU	TAR
First downs	17	23
Total yards	456	390
Rushing yards	68	209
Passing yards	388	181
Turnovers	2	0
Time of possession	28:09	31:51

Team	Category	Player	Statistics
Abilene Christian	Passing	Maverick McIvor	24/34, 384 yards, 3 TD, 2 INT
Abilene Christian	Rushing	Rovaughn Banks Jr.	8 rushes, 34 yards
Abilene Christian	Receiving	Tristan Golightly	7 receptions, 117 yards
Tarleton State	Passing	Beau Allen	16/27, 181 yards, 2 TD
Tarleton State	Rushing	Derrel Kelley III	18 rushes, 114 yards
Tarleton State	Receiving	Derrel Kelley III	5 receptions, 77 yards

=== At Utah Tech ===
	1	2	3	4	Total
Texans	7	7	0	14	28
Trailblazers	7	10	14	3	34

=== Houston Christian ===
	1	2	3	4	Total
Huskies	0	7	0	0	7
Texans	28	7	14	0	49
