= 2022 Sacramento State Hornets football team =

American college football season

2022 Sacramento State Hornets football

Big Sky co-champion

NCAA Division I Quarterfinal, L 63–66 vs. Incarnate Word
- Conference: Big Sky Conference

Ranking
- STATS: No. 5
- FCS Coaches: No. 4
- Record: 12–1 (8–0 Big Sky)
- Head coach: Troy Taylor (3rd season)
- Offensive coordinator: Kris Richardson (3rd season)
- Offensive scheme: West Coast
- Defensive coordinator: Andy Thompson (3rd season)
- Base defense: 4–2–5
- Home stadium: Hornet Stadium

2022 Big Sky Conference football standings
	Conf.			Overall
Team	W		L	W		L
No. 4 Montana State +^	8	–	0	12	–	2
No. 5 Sacramento State +^	8	–	0	12	–	1
No. 9 Weber State ^	6	–	2	10	–	3
No. 18 Idaho ^	6	–	2	7	–	5
No. 25 UC Davis	5	–	3	6	–	5
No. 14 Montana ^	4	–	4	8	–	5
Portland State	3	–	5	4	–	7
Eastern Washington	2	–	6	3	–	8
Northern Colorado	2	–	6	3	–	8
Northern Arizona	2	–	6	3	–	8
Idaho State	1	–	7	1	–	10
Cal Poly	1	–	7	2	–	9
+ – Conference co-champions; ^ – FCS playoff participant; Rankings from STATS Poll

The 2022 Sacramento State Hornets football team represented California State University, Sacramento as a member of the Big Sky Conference during the 2022 NCAA Division I FCS football season. Led by third-year head coach Troy Taylor, the Hornets played their home games on campus at Hornet Stadium in Sacramento, California.

This season set multiple milestones for Sac State. They beat an FBS team for the first time since 2012 with a 41–10 victory over Colorado State. The Hornets claimed their best start to a season in school history when they won their seventh game against Montana 31–24 in overtime, and completed their first perfect regular season in school history following a 27–21 victory over UC Davis. They won their first ever FCS playoff game with a 38–31 win over Richmond. However, in the highest-scoring game in FCS playoff history, they were upset by Incarnate Word in the quarterfinals, 66–63.

After the season in December, Taylor left for Stanford University and defensive coordinator Andy Thompson was promoted to head coach for 2023.

== Preseason ==
=== Polls ===
On July 25, 2022, during the virtual Big Sky Kickoff, the Hornets were predicted to finish second in the Big Sky by the coaches and third by the media.

=== Preseason All–Big Sky team ===
The Hornets had five players selected to the preseason all-Big Sky team.

Offense

Marshel Martin – TE

Pierre Williams – WR

Brandon Weldon – OL

Asher O'Hara – QB

Special teams

Kyle Sentkowski – K

== Schedule ==
Date	Time	Opponent	Rank	Site	TV	Result	Attendance
September 3	7:30 p.m.	Utah Tech*	No. 7	Hornet Stadium; Sacramento, CA	KMAX/ESPN+	W 56–33	10,257
September 17	2:00 p.m.	at Northern Iowa*	No. 8	UNI-Dome; Cedar Falls, IA	ESPN+	W 37–21	8,818
September 24	1:00 p.m.	at Colorado State*	No. 7	Canvas Stadium; Fort Collins, CO		W 41–10	25,445
October 1	5:00 p.m.	at Cal Poly	No. 5	Alex G. Spanos Stadium; San Luis Obispo, CA	ESPN+	W 49–21	8,184
October 8	6:00 p.m.	Northern Colorado	No. 5	Hornet Stadium; Sacramento, CA	KMAX/ESPN+	W 55–7	11,013
October 15	4:00 p.m.	at Eastern Washington	No. 5	Roos Field; Cheney, WA	ESPN+	W 52–28	6,276
October 22	8:00 p.m.	No. 7 Montana	No. 2	Hornet Stadium; Sacramento, CA	ESPN2	W 31–24 ^{OT}	15,927
October 29	6:00 p.m.	No. 14 Idaho^{†}	No. 2	Hornet Stadium; Sacramento, CA	KMAX/ESPN+	W 31–28	17,241
November 5	12:00 p.m.	at No. 5 Weber State	No. 2	Stewart Stadium; Ogden, UT	ESPN+	W 33–30	7,152
November 11	7:00 p.m.	at Portland State	No. 2	Hillsboro Stadium; Hillsboro, OR	ESPN+	W 45–17	2,891
November 19	2:00 p.m.	No. 24 UC Davis	No. 2	Hornet Stadium; Sacramento, CA (Causeway Classic)	KMAX/ESPN+	W 27–21	23,073
December 3	2:00 p.m.	No. 13 Richmond	No. 2	Hornet Stadium; Sacramento, CA (NCAA Division I Second Round)	ESPN+	W 38–31	9,136
December 9	7:30 p.m.	No. 5 Incarnate Word	No. 2	Hornet Stadium; Sacramento, CA (NCAA Division I Quarterfinal)	ESPN+	L 63–66	13,722
*Non-conference game; ^{†}Homecoming; Rankings from STATS Poll released prior to the game; All times are in Pacific time

== Game summaries ==
=== Utah Tech ===
	1	2	3	4	Total
Trailblazers	0	10	9	14	33
No. 7 Hornets	21	14	14	7	56

=== At Northern Iowa ===
	1	2	3	4	Total
No. 8 Hornets	7	17	3	10	37
Panthers	7	0	14	0	21

=== At Colorado State ===
	1	2	3	4	Total
No. 7 Hornets	7	17	7	10	41
Rams	0	10	0	0	10

=== At Cal Poly ===
	1	2	3	4	Total
No. 5 Hornets	7	14	14	14	49
Mustangs	0	0	7	14	21

=== Northern Colorado ===
	1	2	3	4	Total
Bears	0	0	7	0	7
No. 5 Hornets	7	17	21	10	55

=== At Eastern Washington ===
	1	2	3	4	Total
No. 5 Hornets	21	14	10	7	52
Eagles	0	21	7	0	28

=== No. 7 Montana ===
	1	2	3	4	OT	Total
No. 7 Grizzlies	7	3	7	7	0	24
No. 2 Hornets	0	7	0	17	7	31

=== No. 14 Idaho ===
	1	2	3	4	Total
No. 14 Vandals	0	7	7	14	28
No. 2 Hornets	7	10	7	7	31

=== At No. 5 Weber State ===
	1	2	3	4	Total
No. 2 Hornets	7	9	7	10	33
No. 5 Wildcats	7	0	7	16	30

=== At Portland State ===
	1	2	3	4	Total
No. 2 Hornets	7	17	14	7	45
Vikings	0	0	3	14	17

=== No. 24 UC Davis ===
	1	2	3	4	Total
No. 24 Aggies	3	7	3	8	21
No. 2 Hornets	10	7	0	10	27

== FCS Playoffs ==
=== No. 13 Richmond – Second Round ===
	1	2	3	4	Total
No. 13 Spiders	14	7	10	0	31
No. 2 Hornets	7	10	7	14	38

=== No. 5 Incarnate Word – Quarterfinal ===
No. 5 Incarnate Word Cardinals at No. 2 Sacramento State Hornets - NCAA Division I Quarterfinal

Quarter	1	2	3	4	Total
No. 5 Cardinals	7	21	10	28	66
No. 2 Hornets	14	3	17	29	63

at Hornet Stadium, Sacramento, CA

- Date: December 9
- Game time: 7:30 p.m.
- Game weather: Temperature: 48 • Wind: None • Weather: Sunny
- Game attendance: 13,722
- Referee: Bruce Austin
- TV announcers (ESPN+): Connor Onion (play-by-play) and Charles Arbuckle (analyst)
- Box Score

Game information

First Quarter

- SACST – 8:53 Cam Skattebo 1 yard run, Kyle Sentkowski kick
  SACST 7–0 Drive: 10 plays, 81 yards, 3:12
- UIW – 5:12 Marcus Cooper 20 yard pass from Lindsey Scott Jr., Carson Mohr kick
  Tied 7–7 Drive: 11 plays, 86 yards, 3:34
- SACST – 2:28 Marcus Fulcher 35 yard run, Kyle Sentkowski kick
  SACST 14–7 Drive: 6 plays, 65 yards, 2:44

Second Quarter

- UIW – 12:37 Lindsey Scott Jr. 1 yard run, Carson Mohr kick
  Tied 14–14 Drive: 15 plays, 79 yards, 4:45
- SACST – 7:25 Kyle Sentkowski 30 yard field goal
  SACST 17–14 Drive: 13 plays, 66 yards, 5:07
- UIW – 2:56 Roger McCuller 2 yard pass from Lindsey Scott Jr., Carson Mohr kick
  UIW 21–17 Drive: 6 plays, 29 yards, 1:43
- UIW – 0:11 Marcus Cooper, 4 yard run, Carson Mohr kick
  UIW 28–17 Drive: 9 plays, 39 yards, 1:23

Third Quarter

- SACST – 11:04 Cameron Skattebo 2 yard run, Kyle Sentkowski kick
  UIW 28–24 Drive: 12 plays, 75 yards, 3:56
- UIW - 8:26 Carson Mohr 27 yard field goal
  UIW 31–24 Drive: 8 plays, 73 yards, 2:31
- SACST – 4:16 Pierre Williams 16 yard pass from Asher O'Hara, Kyle Sentkowski kick
  Tied 31–31 Drive: 9 plays, 75 yards, 4:04
- UIW – 2:29 Darion Chafin 47 yard pass from Lindsey Scott Jr., Carson Mohr kick
  UIW 38–31 Drive: 5 plays, 74 yards, 1:42
- SACST – 0:04 Kyle Sentkowski 26 yard field goal
  UIW 38–34 Drive: 9 plays, 49 yards, 2:17

Fourth Quarter

- UIW – 14:50 Lindsey Scott Jr. 64 yard run, Carson Mohr kick
  UIW 45–34 Drive: 1 play, 64 yards, 0:10
- SACST – 12:08 Marshel Martin 19 yard pass from Cameron Skattebo, Kyle Sentkowski kick
  UIW 45–41 Drive: 7 plays, 67 yards, 2:37
- SACST – 10:12 Marshel Martin 14 yard pass from Jake Dunniway, Kyle Sentkowski kick
  SACST 48–45 Drive: 6 plays, 55 yards, 1:53
- UIW – 9:23 Marcus Cooper yard run, Carson Mohr kick
  UIW 52–48 Drive: 3 plays, 75 yards, 0:49
- UIW – 8:30 Kelechi Anyalebechi 55 yard fumble recovery, Carson Mohr kick
  UIW 59–48
- SACST – 4:57 Pierre Williams 10 yard pass from Jake Dunniway, Marcus Fulcher pass from Jake Dunniway
  UIW 59–56 Drive: 9 plays, 70 yards, 3:27
- SACST – 1:43 Marshel Martin 4 yard run, Kyle Sentkowski kick
  SACST 63–59 Drive: 8 plays, 57 yards, 3:14
- UIW – 0:27 Taylor Grimes 21 yard pass from Lindsey Scott Jr., Carson Mohr kick
  UIW 66–63 Drive: 7 plays, 75 yards, 1:16

Passing

- UIW – Lindsey Scott Jr. 19/31, 219 YDS, 4 TD
- SACST – Jake Dunniway 19/32, 228 YDS, 2 TD, 2 INT

Rushing

- UIW – Marcus Cooper 22 ATT, 176 YDS, 2 TD
- SACST – Marcus Fulcher 9 ATT, 108 YDS, 1 TD

Receiving

- UIW – Taylor Grimes 6 REC, 53 YDS, 1 TD
- SACST – Marshel Martin 12 REC, 144 YDS, 2 TD

== Ranking movements ==
Ranking movements Legend: ██ Increase in ranking ██ Decrease in ranking ( ) = First-place votes
	Week													
Poll	Pre	1	2	3	4	5	6	7	8	9	10	11	12	Final
STATS FCS	7	7	8	7	5	5	5	2 (1)	2 (2)	2 (1)	2 (6)	2 (7)	2 (9)	5
Coaches	7	6	7	6	5	4	5	3	3	3 (2)	2 (6)	2 (5)	2 (4)	4

== Players drafted into the NFL ==
Round	Pick	Player	Position	NFL team
3	76	Marte Mapu	LB	New England Patriots
