= 2022 Weber State Wildcats football team =

American college football season

2022 Weber State Wildcats football

NCAA Division I Second Round, L 25–33 vs. Montana State
- Conference: Big Sky Conference

Ranking
- STATS: No. 9
- FCS Coaches: No. 9
- Record: 10–3 (6–2 Big Sky)
- Head coach: Jay Hill (9th season)
- Offensive coordinator: Mickey Mental (1st season)
- Offensive scheme: Power spread
- Co-defensive coordinators: Grant Duff (2nd season); Joe Dale (2nd season)
- Base defense: Multiple 4–3
- Home stadium: Stewart Stadium

2022 Big Sky Conference football standings
	Conf.			Overall
Team	W		L	W		L
No. 4 Montana State +^	8	–	0	12	–	2
No. 5 Sacramento State +^	8	–	0	12	–	1
No. 9 Weber State ^	6	–	2	10	–	3
No. 18 Idaho ^	6	–	2	7	–	5
No. 25 UC Davis	5	–	3	6	–	5
No. 14 Montana ^	4	–	4	8	–	5
Portland State	3	–	5	4	–	7
Eastern Washington	2	–	6	3	–	8
Northern Colorado	2	–	6	3	–	8
Northern Arizona	2	–	6	3	–	8
Idaho State	1	–	7	1	–	10
Cal Poly	1	–	7	2	–	9
+ – Conference co-champions; ^ – FCS playoff participant; Rankings from STATS Poll

The 2022 Weber State Wildcats football team represented Weber State University as a member of the Big Sky Conference during the 2022 NCAA Division I FCS football season. The Wildcats were led by ninth-year head coach Jay Hill and played their games at Stewart Stadium in Ogden, Utah. The Wildcats began the regular season ranked number 20 in the FCS rankings. On September 10, the Wildcats defeated the Utah State Aggies, their first win against the Aggies since 1978, and their first win against an FBS opponent since their victory against Nevada in 1993. The Wildcats finished the regular season with a record of 9–2, good enough to qualify for the NCAA Division I FCS Playoffs, their fifth appearance under Jay Hill. The Wildcats defeated North Dakota in the opening round, but were defeated by Montana State the following round. After the season, head coach Jay Hill announced he would step down as Weber State head coach to accept the Defensive Coordinator position at BYU. Offensive coordinator Mickey Mental was announced as Hill's successor.

== Preseason ==
=== Polls ===
On July 25, 2022, during the virtual Big Sky Kickoff, the Wildcats were predicted to finish fourth in the Big Sky by both the coaches and media.

=== Preseason All-Big Sky team ===
The Wildcats had one player selected to the preseason all-Big Sky team.

Offense

Noah Atagi – OL

== Schedule ==
Date	Time	Opponent	Rank	Site	TV	Result	Attendance
September 1	6:00 p.m.	Western Oregon*	No. 20	Stewart Stadium; Ogden, UT	ESPN+	W 41–5	6,522
September 10	4:00 p.m.	at Utah State*	No. 16	Maverik Stadium; Logan, UT	MW Network	W 35–7	17,781
September 17	6:00 p.m.	Utah Tech*	No. 12	Stewart Stadium; Ogden, UT	KJZZ	W 44–14	9,035
September 24	8:00 p.m.	at UC Davis	No. 12	UC Davis Health Stadium; Davis, CA	ESPN+	W 17–12	8,822
October 8	6:00 p.m.	No. 24 Eastern Washington^{†}	No. 7	Stewart Stadium; Ogden, UT	KJZZ/ESPN+	W 45–21	10,724
October 15	3:00 p.m.	at Portland State	No. 6	Hillsboro Stadium; Hillsboro, OR	ESPN+	W 42–7	4,067
October 22	1:00 p.m.	at No. 3 Montana State	No. 5	Bobcat Stadium; Bozeman, MT	ESPN+	L 38–43	20,707
October 29	1:00 p.m.	No. 11 Montana	No. 5T	Stewart Stadium; Ogden, UT	ESPN+	W 24–21	11,722
November 5	1:00 p.m.	No. 2 Sacramento State	No. 5	Stewart Stadium; Ogden, UT	ESPN+	L 30–33	7,152
November 12	1:00 p.m.	Idaho State	No. 7	Stewart Stadium; Ogden, UT	ESPN+	W 45–7	7,756
November 19	1:00 p.m.	at Northern Arizona	No. 7	Walkup Skydome; Flagstaff, AZ	ESPN+	W 33–31	5,217
November 26	2:00 p.m.	No. 20 North Dakota*	No. 9	Stewart Stadium; Ogden, UT (NCAA Division I First Round)	ESPN+	W 38–31	4,495
December 3	1:00 p.m.	at No. 3 Montana State*	No. 9	Bobcat Stadium; Bozeman, MT (NCAA Division I Second Round)	ESPN+	L 25–33	16,397
*Non-conference game; ^{†}Homecoming; Rankings from STATS Poll released prior to the game; All times are in Mountain time

== Game summaries ==
=== Western Oregon ===
	1	2	3	4	Total
Wolves	2	0	3	0	5
No. 20 Wildcats	14	10	7	10	41

=== At Utah State ===
	1	2	3	4	Total
No. 16 Wildcats	13	0	15	7	35
Aggies	7	0	0	0	7

=== Utah Tech ===
	1	2	3	4	Total
Trailblazers	7	7	0	0	14
No. 12 Wildcats	21	3	13	7	44

=== At UC Davis ===
	1	2	3	4	Total
No. 12 Wildcats	7	7	3	0	17
Aggies	3	3	6	0	12

=== No. 24 Eastern Washington ===
	1	2	3	4	Total
No. 24 Eagles	7	7	7	0	21
No. 7 Wildcats	14	7	10	14	45

=== At Portland State ===
	1	2	3	4	Total
No. 6 Wildcats	14	7	14	7	42
Vikings	0	0	0	7	7

=== At No. 3 Montana State ===
	1	2	3	4	Total
No. 5 Wildcats	17	7	8	6	38
No. 3 Bobcats	9	18	16	0	43

=== No. 11 Montana ===
	1	2	3	4	Total
No. 11 Grizzles	3	7	3	8	21
No. 5T Wildcats	7	3	7	7	24

=== No. 2 Sacramento State ===
	1	2	3	4	Total
No. 2 Hornets	7	9	7	10	33
No. 5 Wildcats	7	0	7	16	30

=== Idaho State ===
	1	2	3	4	Total
Bengals	0	7	0	0	7
No. 7 Wildcats	7	14	10	14	45

=== At Northern Arizona ===
	1	2	3	4	Total
No. 7 Wildcats	14	7	6	6	33
Lumberjacks	0	21	0	10	31

== FCS Playoffs ==
=== No. 20 North Dakota – first round ===
	1	2	3	4	Total
No. 20 Fighting Hawks	0	14	3	14	31
No. 9 Wildcats	7	24	7	0	38

=== At No. 3 Montana State – second round ===
	1	2	3	4	Total
No. 9 Wildcats	3	7	0	15	25
No. 3 Bobcats	7	9	10	7	33
