= 2022 Montana Grizzlies football team =

American college football season

2022 Montana Grizzlies football

NCAA Division I Second Round, L 26–49 at North Dakota State
- Conference: Big Sky Conference

Ranking
- STATS: No. 14
- FCS Coaches: No. 14
- Record: 8–5 (4–4 Big Sky)
- Head coach: Bobby Hauck (12th season)
- Offensive coordinator: Timm Rosenbach (5th season)
- Offensive scheme: Spread
- Defensive coordinator: Kent Baer (4th season)
- Base defense: 3–3–5
- Home stadium: Washington–Grizzly Stadium

2022 Big Sky Conference football standings
	Conf.			Overall
Team	W		L	W		L
No. 4 Montana State +^	8	–	0	12	–	2
No. 5 Sacramento State +^	8	–	0	12	–	1
No. 9 Weber State ^	6	–	2	10	–	3
No. 18 Idaho ^	6	–	2	7	–	5
No. 25 UC Davis	5	–	3	6	–	5
No. 14 Montana ^	4	–	4	8	–	5
Portland State	3	–	5	4	–	7
Eastern Washington	2	–	6	3	–	8
Northern Colorado	2	–	6	3	–	8
Northern Arizona	2	–	6	3	–	8
Idaho State	1	–	7	1	–	10
Cal Poly	1	–	7	2	–	9
+ – Conference co-champions; ^ – FCS playoff participant; Rankings from STATS Poll

The 2022 Montana Grizzlies football team represented the University of Montana as a member of the Big Sky Conference during the 2022 NCAA Division I FCS football season. The Grizzlies were led by head coach Bobby Hauck, in the fifth season of his current stint and the twelfth overall, as he was head coach from 2003 to 2009. The team played their home games at Washington–Grizzly Stadium in Missoula, Montana.

== Preseason ==
=== Polls ===
On July 25, 2022, during the virtual Big Sky Kickoff, the Grizzlies were predicted to finish first in the Big Sky by both the coaches and media.

Coaches poll
Predicted finish	Team	Votes (1st place)
1	Montana	111 (3)
2	Sacramento State	110 (4)
3	Montana State	109 (5)
4	Weber State	84
5	UC Davis	82
6	Eastern Washington	76
7	Northern Arizona	62
8	Idaho	45
9	Portland State	42
10	Cal Poly	33
T-11	Idaho State	19
T-11	Northern Colorado	19

Media poll
Predicted finish	Team	Votes (1st place)
1	Montana	356 (14)
2	Montana State	352 (13)
3	Sacramento State	335 (4)
4	Weber State	261
5	UC Davis	255 (1)
6	Eastern Washington	236
7	Northern Arizona	191
8	Portland State	146
9	Idaho	142
10	Cal Poly	85
11	Northern Colorado	71
12	Idaho State	66

=== Preseason All–Big Sky team ===
The Grizzlies had five players selected to the preseason all-Big Sky team.

Offense

Malik Flowers – WR

Defense

Patrick O'Connell – LB

Alex Gubner – DT

Robby Hauck – S

Justin Ford – CB

== Schedule ==
Date	Time	Opponent	Rank	Site	TV	Result	Attendance
September 3	1:00 p.m.	Northwestern State*	No. 3	Washington–Grizzly Stadium; Missoula, MT	KTMF/ESPN+	W 47–0	24,096
September 10	1:00 p.m.	South Dakota*	No. 3	Washington–Grizzly Stadium; Missoula, MT	KTMF/ESPN+	W 24–7	24,204
September 17	11:00 a.m.	at Indiana State*	No. 3	Memorial Stadium; Terre Haute, IN	ESPN+	W 49–14	5,929
September 24	2:00 p.m.	Portland State^{†}	No. T–2	Washington–Grizzly Stadium; Missoula, MT	KPAX/ESPN+	W 53–16	26,087
October 1	1:00 p.m.	at Idaho State	No. 3	Holt Arena; Pocatello, ID	KPAX/ESPN+	W 28–20	6,659
October 15	1:00 p.m.	Idaho	No. 3	Washington–Grizzly Stadium; Missoula, MT (Little Brown Stein)	KPAX/ESPN+	L 23–30	26,314
October 22	9:00 p.m.	at No. 2 Sacramento State	No. 7	Hornet Stadium; Sacramento, CA	ESPN2	L 24–31 ^{OT}	15,927
October 29	1:00 p.m.	at No. T–5 Weber State	No. 11	Stewart Stadium; Ogden, UT	KPAX/ESPN+	L 21–24	11,722
November 5	6:00 p.m.	Cal Poly	No. 16	Washington–Grizzly Stadium; Missoula, MT	KPAX/ESPN+	W 57–0	25,684
November 12	1:00 p.m.	Eastern Washington	No. 16	Washington–Grizzly Stadium; Missoula, MT (EWU–UM Governors Cup)	KPAX/ESPN+	W 63–7	25,403
November 19	12:00 p.m.	at No. 3 Montana State	No. 13	Bobcat Stadium; Bozeman, MT (rivalry, College GameDay)	KPAX/ESPN+	L 21–55	22,047
November 26	8:00 p.m.	No. 14 Southeast Missouri State*	No. 19	Washington–Grizzly Stadium; Missoula, MT (NCAA Division I First Round)	ESPN2/ESPN+	W 34–24	13,390
December 3	2:30 p.m.	at No. 4 North Dakota State*	No. 19	Fargodome; Fargo, ND (NCAA Division I Second Round)	ESPN+	L 26–49	12,929
*Non-conference game; ^{†}Homecoming; Rankings from STATS Poll released prior to the game; All times are in Mountain time

== Game summaries ==
=== Northwestern State ===
	1	2	3	4	Total
Demons	0	0	0	0	0
No. 3 Grizzles	13	13	7	14	47

=== South Dakota ===
	1	2	3	4	Total
Coyotes	0	0	0	7	7
No. 3 Grizzles	13	0	9	2	24

=== At Indiana State ===
	1	2	3	4	Total
No. 3 Grizzles	14	7	14	14	49
Sycamores	7	0	0	7	14

=== Portland State ===
	1	2	3	4	Total
Vikings	7	7	2	0	16
No. 2T Grizzles	14	25	0	14	53

=== At Idaho State ===
	1	2	3	4	Total
No. 3 Grizzles	0	21	7	0	28
Bengals	3	3	0	14	20

=== Idaho ===
	1	2	3	4	Total
Vandals	3	9	10	8	30
No. 3 Grizzles	6	7	3	7	23

=== At No. 2 Sacramento State ===
	1	2	3	4	OT	Total
No. 7 Grizzles	7	3	7	7	0	24
No. 2 Hornets	0	7	0	17	7	31

=== At No. 5т Weber State ===
	1	2	3	4	Total
No. 11 Grizzles	3	7	3	8	21
No. 5T Wildcats	7	3	7	7	24

=== Cal Poly ===
	1	2	3	4	Total
Mustangs	0	0	0	0	0
No. 16 Grizzles	14	17	13	13	57

=== Eastern Washington ===
	1	2	3	4	Total
Eagles	0	0	7	0	7
No. 16 Grizzles	21	21	14	7	63

=== At No. 3 Montana State ===
	1	2	3	4	Total
No. 13 Grizzles	7	0	0	14	21
No. 3 Bobcats	21	10	10	14	55

== FCS Playoffs ==
=== No. 14 Southeast Missouri State – First Round ===
	1	2	3	4	Total
No. 14 Redhawks	7	10	7	0	24
No. 19 Grizzlies	0	3	21	10	34

=== At No. 4 North Dakota State – Second Round ===
	1	2	3	4	Total
No. 19 Grizzlies	7	6	7	6	26
No. 4 Bison	14	7	14	14	49

== Ranking movements ==
Ranking movements Legend: ██ Increase in ranking ██ Decrease in ranking т = Tied with team above or below ( ) = First-place votes
	Week													
Poll	Pre	1	2	3	4	5	6	7	8	9	10	11	12	Final
STATS FCS	3	3	3	2т (6)	3 (7)	3 (6)	3 (7)	7	11	16	16	13	19	
Coaches	2	2	2 (1)	2 (5)	2 (4)	2 (3)	2 (3)	7	10	13	14	12	17	
