= 2022 UC Davis Aggies football team =

American college football season

2022 UC Davis Aggies football
- Conference: Big Sky Conference

Ranking
- STATS: No. 25
- Record: 6–5 (5–3 Big Sky)
- Head coach: Dan Hawkins (6th season)
- Offensive coordinator: Cody Hawkins (2nd season)
- Defensive coordinator: Matt Coombs (3rd season)
- Home stadium: UC Davis Health Stadium

2022 Big Sky Conference football standings
	Conf.			Overall
Team	W		L	W		L
No. 4 Montana State +^	8	–	0	12	–	2
No. 5 Sacramento State +^	8	–	0	12	–	1
No. 9 Weber State ^	6	–	2	10	–	3
No. 18 Idaho ^	6	–	2	7	–	5
No. 25 UC Davis	5	–	3	6	–	5
No. 14 Montana ^	4	–	4	8	–	5
Portland State	3	–	5	4	–	7
Eastern Washington	2	–	6	3	–	8
Northern Colorado	2	–	6	3	–	8
Northern Arizona	2	–	6	3	–	8
Idaho State	1	–	7	1	–	10
Cal Poly	1	–	7	2	–	9
+ – Conference co-champions; ^ – FCS playoff participant; Rankings from STATS Poll

The 2022 UC Davis football team represented the University of California, Davis as a member of the Big Sky Conference during the 2022 NCAA Division I FCS football season. Led by sixth-year head coach Dan Hawkins, the Aggies played their home games at UC Davis Health Stadium in Davis, California.

== Preseason ==
=== Polls ===
On July 25, 2022, during the virtual Big Sky Kickoff, the Aggies were predicted to finish fifth in the Big Sky by both the coaches and media.

=== Preseason All–Big Sky team ===
The Aggies had three players selected to the preseason all-Big Sky team.

Offense

Ulonzo Gilliam, Jr. – WR

Connor Pettek – C

Jake Parks – G

== Schedule ==
Date	Time	Opponent	Rank	Site	TV	Result	Attendance
September 3	1:00 p.m.	at California*	No. 25	California Memorial Stadium; Berkeley, CA	P12N	L 13–34	34,984
September 10	6:00 p.m.	at No. 2 South Dakota State*		Dana J. Dykhouse Stadium; Brookings, SD	ESPN+	L 22–24	15,182
September 17	7:00 p.m.	San Diego*		UC Davis Health Stadium; Davis, CA	ESPN+	W 43–13	14,394
September 24	7:00 p.m.	No. 12 Weber State		UC Davis Health Stadium; Davis, CA	ESPN+	L 12–17	8,822
October 1	7:15 p.m.	at No. 4 Montana State		Bobcat Stadium; Bozeman, MT	ESPNU	L 24–41	21,637
October 15	4:00 p.m.	Northern Arizona^{†}		UC Davis Health Stadium; Davis, CA	ESPN+	W 56–27	9,152
October 22	12:00 p.m.	at Northern Colorado		Nottingham Field; Greeley, CO	ESPN+	W 58–10	4,499
October 29	4:00 p.m.	Cal Poly		UC Davis Health Stadium; Davis, CA (Battle for the Golden Horseshoe)	ESPN+	W 59–17	8,189
November 5	4:00 p.m.	Idaho State		UC Davis Health Stadium; Davis, CA	ESPN+	W 43–3	6,802
November 12	4:00 p.m.	at No. 15 Idaho		Kibbie Dome; Moscow, ID	ESPN+	W 44–26	7,681
November 19	2:00 p.m.	at No. 2 Sacramento State	No. 24	Hornet Stadium; Sacramento, CA (Causeway Classic)	ESPN+	L 21–27	23,073
*Non-conference game; ^{†}Homecoming; Rankings from STATS Poll released prior to the game; All times are in Pacific time

== Game summaries ==
=== At California ===
UC Davis Aggies (0–0) vs California Golden Bears (0–0) – Game summary

Quarter	1	2	3	4	Total
No. 25 Aggies	7	0	6	0	13
Golden Bears	0	17	10	7	34

at California Memorial Stadium • Berkeley, CA

- Date: September 3, 2022
- Game time: 1:07 p.m.
- Game weather: Sunny, 76 °F (24 °C)
- Game attendance: 34,984
- Referee: Michael Mothershed
- TV announcers (Pac-12 Network): Guy Haberman (play-by-play), Shane Vereen (analyst)

Game information

First Quarter

- (3:09) UCD – Chaz Davis 4-yard pass from Miles Hastings, Isaiah Gomez kick (Drive: 14 plays, 53 yards, 5:39; UCD 7–0)

Second Quarter

- (8:54) CAL – Jeremiah Hunter 3-yard pass from Jack Plummer, Dario Longhetto kick (Drive: 8 plays, 53 yards, 3:26; Tied 7–7)
- (2:25) CAL – Jaydn Ott 8-yard pass from Jack Plummer, Dario Longhetto kick (Drive: 10 plays, 87 yards, 4:08; California 14–7)
- (0:00) CAL – Dario Longhetto 32-yard field goal (Drive: 5 plays, 52 yards, 0:36; California 17–7)

Third Quarter

- (14:20) CAL – Craig Woodson 39-yard interception return, Dario Longhetto kick (Drive: 2 plays, 5 yards, 0:40; California 24–7)
- (14:04) UCD – Ulonzo Gilliam Jr. 60-yard run (Drive: 1 plays, 60 yards, 0:10; California 24–13)
- (7:02) CAL – Dario Longhetto 41-yard field goal (Drive: 15 plays, 59 yards, 6:57; California 27–13)

Fourth Quarter

- (7:19) CAL – Mavin Anderson 14-yard pass from Jack Plummer, Dario Longhetto kick (Drive: 5 plays, 58 yards, 1:37; California 34–13)

Statistics	UCD	CAL
First downs	19	24
Total yards	387	415
Rushes/yards	27–145	34–147
Passing yards	242	262
Passing: Comp–Att–Int	32–50–2	23–35–1
Time of possession	30:01	29:59

Team	Category	Player	Statistics
UC Davis	Passing	Miles Hastings	32/50, 242 yards, TD, 2 INT
UC Davis	Rushing	Ulonzo Gilliam Jr.	14 carries, 115 yards, TD
UC Davis	Receiving	Chaz Davis	5 receptions, 53 yards, TD
California	Passing	Jack Plummer	23/35, 268 yards, 3 TD, INT
California	Rushing	Jaydn Ott	17 carries, 104 yards
California	Receiving	Jeremiah Hunter	6 receptions, 78 yards

=== At No. 2 South Dakota State ===
	1	2	3	4	Total
Aggies	0	10	0	12	22
No. 2 Jackrabbits	7	10	0	7	24

=== San Diego ===
	1	2	3	4	Total
Toreros	0	7	6	0	13
Aggies	14	21	8	0	43

=== No. 12 Weber State ===
	1	2	3	4	Total
No. 12 Wildcats	7	7	3	0	17
Aggies	3	3	6	0	12

=== At No. 4 Montana State ===
	1	2	3	4	Total
Aggies	10	3	11	0	24
No. 4 Bobcats	7	17	14	3	41

=== Northern Arizona ===
	1	2	3	4	Total
Lumberjacks	6	0	14	7	27
Aggies	7	28	21	0	56

=== At Northern Colorado ===
	1	2	3	4	Total
Aggies	6	21	14	17	58
Bears	3	0	0	7	10

=== Cal Poly ===
	1	2	3	4	Total
Mustangs	0	17	0	0	17
Aggies	14	17	14	14	59

=== Idaho State ===
	1	2	3	4	Total
Bengals	3	0	0	0	3
Aggies	9	13	14	7	43

=== At No. 15 Idaho ===
	1	2	3	4	Total
Aggies	14	17	3	10	44
#15 Vandals	7	0	12	7	26

=== At No. 2 Sacramento State ===
	1	2	3	4	Total
No. 24 Aggies	3	7	3	8	21
No. 2 Hornets	10	7	0	10	27

== Ranking movements ==
Ranking movements Legend: ██ Increase in ranking ██ Decrease in ranking RV = Received votes
	Week													
Poll	Pre	1	2	3	4	5	6	7	8	9	10	11	12	Final
STATS	25	RV	RV	RV					RV					
Coaches	22	25	RV	RV										
