= Elijah Dotson =

American football player (born 1999)

Profile
- Position: Running back

Personal information
- Born: January 19, 1999 (age 27); Sacramento, California, U.S.
- Listed height: 5 ft 9 in (1.75 m)
- Listed weight: 202 lb (92 kg)

Career information
- High school: Antelope (Antelope, California)
- College: Sacramento State (2017–2021); Northern Colorado (2022)
- NFL draft: 2023: undrafted

Career history
- Los Angeles Chargers (2023); Atlanta Falcons (2024)*; Orlando Storm (2026)
- * Offseason or practice squad member only

Awards and highlights
- 2× First-team All-Big Sky (2018, 2019); HERO Sports second-team All-American (2019)

Career NFL statistics
- Rushing yards: 6
- Rushing average: 1.5
- Receptions: 2
- Receiving yards: 13
- Stats at Pro Football Reference

Elijah Dotson (born January 19, 1999) is an American professional football running back. He played college football for the Sacramento State Hornets and Northern Colorado Bears.

== Early life ==
Dotson played Pop Warner for the Jr. Foothill Mustangs (Sacramento) and attended Antelope High School in Antelope, California.

== College career ==
Year	Team	Games		Rushing				Receiving				Kick returns				Punt returns			
Year	Team	GP	GS	Att	Yards	Avg	TD	Rec	Yards	Avg	TD	Ret	Yards	Avg	TD	Ret	Yards	Avg	TD
2017	Sacramento State	11	5	87	475	5.5	5	8	139	17.4	2	19	403	21.2	0	0	0	0.0	0
2018	Sacramento State	10	10	185	1,154	6.2	9	14	160	11.4	0	0	0	0.0	0	0	0	0.0	0
2019	Sacramento State	13	13	151	742	4.9	7	70	702	10.0	4	0	0	0.0	0	1	1	1.0	0
2020	Sacramento State	Team did not play due to COVID-19 concerns																	
2021	Sacramento State	4	4	28	95	3.4	1	18	108	6.0	0	0	0	0.0	0	0	0	0.0	0
2022	Northern Colorado	11	11	206	929	4.5	6	47	329	7.0	2	13	252	19.4	0	1	82	82.0	1
Career		49	43	657	3,395	5.2	28	157	1,438	9.2	8	32	655	20.5	0	2	83	41.5	1

== Professional career ==
Pre-draft measurables
Height	Weight	Arm length	Hand span	Wingspan	40-yard dash	10-yard split	20-yard split	20-yard shuttle	Three-cone drill	Vertical jump	Broad jump	Bench press
5 ft 9 1/4 in (1.76 m)	202 lb (92 kg)	30 7/8 in (0.78 m)	8 7/8 in (0.23 m)	6 ft 1 3/4 in (1.87 m)	4.53 s	1.61 s	2.69 s	4.26 s	7.39 s	33.5 in (0.85 m)	10 ft 1 in (3.07 m)	21 reps
All values from Pro Day

=== Los Angeles Chargers ===
Dotson signed with the Los Angeles Chargers as an undrafted free agent in 2023. He played in four games before being waived on December 2, 2023. Dotson was re-signed to the team's practice squad on December 5. He signed a reserve/future contract with Los Angeles on January 11, 2024.

On August 27, 2024, Dotson was waived by the Chargers as part of final roster cuts.

=== Atlanta Falcons ===
On December 3, 2024, Dotson signed with the Atlanta Falcons' practice squad. He signed a reserve/future contract with Atlanta on January 6, 2025.

On August 23, 2025, Dotson was waived by the Falcons as part of final roster cuts.

=== Orlando Storm ===
On January 21, 2026, Dotson signed with the Orlando Storm of the United Football League (UFL).
