= 2022 Utah Tech Trailblazers football team =

American college football season

2022 Utah Tech Trailblazers football
- Conference: Western Athletic Conference
- Record: 4–7 (2–2 WAC)
- Head coach: Paul Peterson (4th season)
- Offensive coordinator: Craig Stutzmann (1st season)
- Offensive scheme: Spread-N-Shred
- Co-defensive coordinators: Shane Hunter (1st season); Misi Tupe (3rd season)
- Home stadium: Greater Zion Stadium

2022 Western Athletic Conference football standings
	Conf.			Overall
Team	W		L	W		L
Stephen F. Austin +	3	–	1	6	–	5
Abilene Christian +	3	–	1	7	–	4
Sam Houston *	3	–	2	5	–	4
Utah Tech *	2	–	2	4	–	7
Tarleton State *	1	–	3	6	–	5
Southern Utah	1	–	3	5	–	6
+ – Conference co-champions; * Note: Sam Houston ineligible for WAC championship and FCS postseason play due to start of transition to FBS; Tarleton and Utah Tech ineligible for FCS postseason play due to transition from NCAA Division II.; Rankings from STATS Poll

The 2022 Utah Tech Trailblazers football team represented Utah Tech University (formerly Dixie State University) as a member of the Western Athletic Conference (WAC) during the 2022 NCAA Division I FCS football season. They were led by head coach Paul Peterson, who was coaching his fourth season overall with the program. The Trailblazers played their home games at Greater Zion Stadium in St. George, Utah. This was their first season playing under the Utah Tech name.

== Schedule ==
Utah Tech and the WAC announced the 2022 football schedule on January 12, 2022.

Date	Time	Opponent	Site	TV	Result	Attendance
September 3	7:00 p.m.	at No. 7 Sacramento State*	Hornet Stadium; Sacramento, CA	ESPN+	L 33–56	10,257
September 10	7:00 p.m.	Chadron State*	Greater Zion Stadium; St. George, UT	ESPN+	W 56–10	669
September 17	6:00 p.m.	at No. 14 Weber State*	Stewart Stadium; Ogden, UT	KJZZ	L 14–44	9,035
September 24	6:00 p.m.	at Southern Utah	Eccles Coliseum; Cedar City, UT	ESPN+	L 17–31	8,069
October 1	7:00 p.m.	Abilene Christian	Greater Zion Stadium; St. George, UT	ESPN+	L 10–26	3,718
October 15	3:00 p.m.	at Northern Iowa*	UNI-Dome; Cedar Falls, IA	ESPN+	L 14–41	6,942
October 22	7:00 p.m.	Sam Houston	Greater Zion Stadium; St. George, UT	ESPN+	L 13–18	2,719
October 29	3:00 p.m.	at Stephen F. Austin	Homer Bryce Stadium; Nacogdoches, TX	ESPN+	W 47–44	7,156
November 5	6:00 p.m.	Southern Utah*^{†}	Greater Zion Stadium; St. George, UT	ESPN+	W 48–36	6,903
November 12	1:00 p.m.	Tarleton State	Greater Zion Stadium; St. George, UT	ESPN+	W 34−28	2,259
November 19	1:30 p.m.	at BYU*	LaVell Edwards Stadium; Provo, UT	BYUtv/ESPN3	L 26–52	56,059
*Non-conference game; ^{†}Homecoming; Rankings from STATS Poll released prior to the game; All times are in Mountain time
