= 2022 William & Mary Tribe football team =

American college football season

2022 William & Mary Tribe football

CAA co-champion Lambert Cup winner

NCAA Division I Quarterfinal, L 7–55 vs. Montana State
- Conference: Colonial Athletic Association

Ranking
- STATS: No. 8
- FCS Coaches: No. 8
- Record: 11–2 (7–1 CAA)
- Head coach: Mike London (4th season)
- Offensive coordinator: Christian Taylor (3rd season)
- Defensive coordinator: Vincent Brown (4th season)
- Home stadium: Zable Stadium

2022 Colonial Athletic Association football standings
	Conf.			Overall
Team	W		L	W		L
No. 8 William & Mary +^	7	–	1	11	–	2
No. 13 New Hampshire +^	7	–	1	9	–	4
No. 11 Richmond ^	6	–	2	9	–	4
No. 17 Elon ^	6	–	2	8	–	4
Rhode Island	5	–	3	7	–	4
No. 19 Delaware ^	4	–	4	8	–	5
Towson	4	–	4	6	–	5
Villanova	4	–	4	6	–	5
Monmouth	3	–	5	5	–	6
Albany	2	–	6	3	–	8
Maine	2	–	6	2	–	9
Hampton	1	–	7	4	–	7
Stony Brook	1	–	7	2	–	9
+ – Conference co-champions; ^ – FCS playoff participant; Rankings from STATS Poll

The 2022 William & Mary Tribe football team represented the College of William & Mary as a member of the Colonial Athletic Association (CAA) during the 2022 NCAA Division I FCS football season. The Tribe, led by fourth-year head coach Mike London, played their home games at Zable Stadium. By finishing 7–1 in regular season CAA games, the Tribe tied with New Hampshire as conference co-champions. They went 6–0 on the road in the regular season for the first time in program history. William & Mary earned the FCS playoffs automatic bid. They made it to the quarterfinals before losing 55–7 to the #3 team in the nation, Montana State. The 11 wins tied a school record previously set twice, in 2004 and 2009.

== Preseason ==
=== CAA poll ===
In the CAA preseason poll released on July 28, 2022, the Tribe were predicted to finish in fifth place out of 13 teams following the departure of James Madison and the addition on Monmouth and Hampton for the 2022 season.

Predicted finish	Team	Votes (1st place)
1	Villanova	270 (16)
2	Delaware	235 (7)
3	Rhode Island	224
4	Richmond	219
5	William & Mary	206 (2)
6	Elon	191 (1)
7	Stony Brook	151
8	Maine	134
9	New Hampshire	117
10	Monmouth	105
11	Towson	81
12	Albany	64
13	Hampton	31

=== Preseason All-CAA team ===
Junior running back Bronson Yoder, senior defensive lineman Nate Lynn, and senior cornerback Ryan Poole were named to the CAA preseason all-conference team. Lynn was also named the preseason CAA Defensive Player of the Year.

== Schedule ==
Date	Time	Opponent	Rank	Site	TV	Result	Attendance
September 2	7:00 p.m.	at Charlotte*		Jerry Richardson Stadium; Charlotte, NC	ESPN3	W 41–24	13,940
September 10	6:00 p.m.	Campbell*	No. 20	Zable Stadium; Williamsburg, VA	Cox/Flo Football	W 37–21	8,558
September 17	3:30 p.m.	at Lafayette*	No. 15	Fisher Stadium; Easton, PA	ESPN+	W 34–7	5,244
September 24	3:30 p.m.	Elon	No. 14	Zable Stadium; Williamsburg, VA	Cox/Flo Football	L 31–35	10,803
October 1	3:30 p.m.	at Stony Brook	No. 18	Kenneth P. LaValle Stadium; Stony Brook, NY	Flo Football	W 27–10	3,581
October 8	3:30 p.m.	No. 6 Delaware^{†}	No. 16	Zable Stadium; Williamsburg, VA (Rivalry)	Cox/Flo Football	W 27–21	12,506
October 22	4:00 p.m.	at Towson	No. 12	Johnny Unitas Stadium; Towson, MD	Flo Football	W 44–24	4,445
October 29	1:00 p.m.	No. 18 Rhode Island	No. 10	Zable Stadium; Williamsburg, VA	Cox/Flo Football	W 31–30	7,981
November 5	1:00 p.m.	at Hampton	No. 8	Armstrong Stadium; Hampton, VA	Flo Football	W 20–14	4,126
November 12	1:00 p.m.	Villanova	No. 8	Zable Stadium; Williamsburg, VA	Cox/Flo Football	W 45–12	10,280
November 19	12:00 p.m.	at No. 11 Richmond	No. 8	E. Claiborne Robins Stadium; Richmond, VA (Capital Cup)	Flo Football	W 37–26	8,200
December 3	2:00 p.m.	Gardner–Webb*	No. 6	Zable Stadium; Williamsburg, VA (NCAA Division I Second Round)	ESPN+	W 54–14	7,110
December 9	10:15 p.m.	at No. 3 Montana State*	No. 6	Bobcat Stadium; Bozeman, MT (NCAA Division I Quarterfinal)	ESPN2/ESPN+	L 7–55	14,367
*Non-conference game; ^{†}Homecoming; Rankings from STATS Poll released prior to the game; All times are in Eastern time

== Game summaries ==
=== At Charlotte ===
William & Mary vs Charlotte

Team	1	2	3	4	Total
• Tribe	10	7	3	21	41
49ers	3	14	7	0	24

- Date: September 2
- Location: Jerry Richardson Stadium
  Charlotte, NC
- Game start: 7:02 pm EDT
- Elapsed time: 3:28
- Game attendance: 13,940
- Game weather: 87 °F (31 °C) • Weather: Clear• Wind: NW 2 MPH
- Referee: Scott Hardin
- TV announcers (ESPN3): Bobby Rosinski, Reginald Walker Jr.

Scoring summary
1	12:17	W&M	Ethan CHANG 36 Yd Field Goal	W&M 3–0
1	5:19	CHAR	Antonio ZITA 32 Yd Field Goal	TIED 3–3
1	4:28	W&M	Tyler ROSE 31 Yd pass from Darius WILSON (Ethan CHANG Kick)	W&M 10–3
2	10:22	W&M	Donavyn LESTER 22 Yd Run (Ethan CHANG Kick)	W&M 17–3
2	6:34	CHAR	ChaVon MCEACHERN 3 Yd Run (Antonio ZITA Kick)	W&M 17–10
2	0:13	CHAR	Xavier WILLIAMS 2 Yd Run (Antonio ZITA Kick)	TIED 17–17
3	4:30	W&M	Ethan CHANG 28 Yd Field Goal	W&M 20–17
3	2:18	CHAR	Xavier WILLIAMS 67 Yd Run (Antonio ZITA Kick)	CHAR 24–20
4	12:31	W&M	Bronson YODER 1 Yd Run (Ethan CHANG Kick)	W&M 27–24
4	9:54	W&M	Lachlan PITTS 65 Yd pass from Darius WILSON (Ethan CHANG Kick)	W&M 34–24
4	7:38	W&M	Malachi IMOH 17 Yd Run (Ethan CHANG Kick)	W&M 41–24

Game notes:

- This was William & Mary's first win over an FBS team since 2009, when the Tribe upset Virginia 26–14 in Charlottesville.

Team	Category	Player	Statistics
William & Mary	Passing	Darius Wilson	12–18, 237 yards, 2 TD
William & Mary	Rushing	Bronson Yoder	15 rushes, 120 yards, 1 TD
William & Mary	Receiving	Lacklan Pitts	1 reception, 65 yards, 1 TD
Charlotte	Passing	Xavier Williams	12–23, 201 yards
Charlotte	Rushing	Xavier Williams	10 rushes, 48 yards, 2 TD
Charlotte	Receiving	Elijah Spencer	5 receptions, 107 yards

Statistics	W&M	CHAR
First downs	25	22
Total yards	559	379
Rushing yards	303	131
Passing yards	256	248
Turnovers	0	0
Time of possession	32:05	27:55

=== Campbell ===
	1	2	3	4	Total
Fighting Camels	0	7	14	0	21
No. 20 Tribe	10	7	20	0	37

=== At Lafayette ===
	1	2	3	4	Total
No. 15 Tribe	14	3	10	7	34
Leopards	7	0	0	0	7

=== Elon ===
	1	2	3	4	Total
Phoenix	7	3	6	19	35
No. 14 Tribe	14	14	3	0	31

=== At Stony Brook ===
	1	2	3	4	Total
No. 18 Tribe	3	3	7	14	27
Seawolves	10	0	0	0	10

=== No. 6 Delaware ===
	1	2	3	4	Total
No. 6 Fightin' Blue Hens	0	7	14	0	21
No. 16 Tribe	0	17	7	3	27

=== At Towson ===
	1	2	3	4	Total
No. 12 Tribe	14	16	7	7	44
Tigers	3	0	7	14	24

=== No. 18 Rhode Island ===
	1	2	3	4	Total
No. 18 Rams	7	7	7	9	30
No. 10 Tribe	0	14	7	10	31

=== At Hampton ===
	1	2	3	4	Total
No. 8 Tribe	7	3	7	3	20
Pirates	0	7	7	0	14

=== Villanova ===
	1	2	3	4	Total
Wildcats	3	3	0	6	12
No. 8 Tribe	14	14	10	7	45

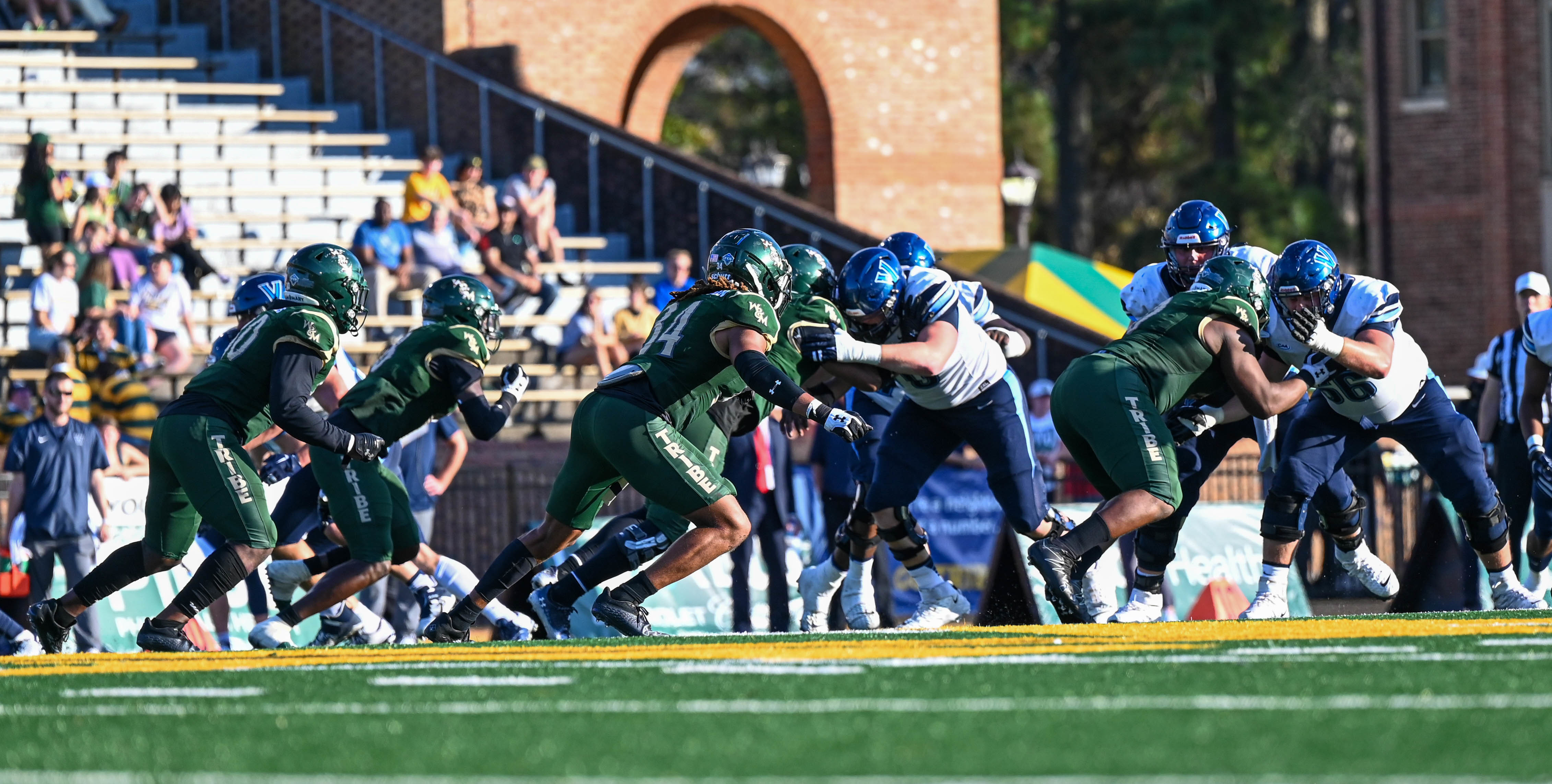
William & Mary defenders take on the Villanova offensive line at Zable Stadium

=== At No. 11 Richmond ===
	1	2	3	4	Total
No. 8 Tribe	7	10	14	6	37
No. 11 Spiders	6	7	7	6	26

== FCS Playoffs ==
=== Gardner–Webb – second round ===
	1	2	3	4	Total
Runnin' Bulldogs	0	0	7	7	14
No. 5 Tribe	7	27	13	7	54

=== At No. 4 Montana State – Quarterfinals ===
	1	2	3	4	Total
No. 5 Tribe	0	0	0	7	7
No. 4 Bobcats	10	17	28	0	55

== Awards and honors ==
William & Mary had a league-high 13 players receive all-conference honors, highlighted by two major award winners in John Pius and Jalen Jones. Pius was also named a top-three finalist for the Buck Buchanan Award, given annually to the most outstanding defensive player in all of Division I FCS.

- CAA Defensive Player of the Year – John Pius (linebacker, sophomore)
- CAA Defensive Rookie of the Year – Jalen Jones (cornerback, freshman)
- CAA First Team Offense – Bronson Yoder (running back, senior); Charles Grant (offensive lineman, sophomore); Colby Sorsdal (offensive lineman, senior)
- CAA First Team Defense – Nate Lynn (defensive lineman, senior); John Pius (linebacker, sophomore); Ryan Poole (cornerback, senior); Caylin Newton (special teams, senior)
- CAA Second Team Offense – Donavyn Lester (fullback / halfback, senior); Lachlan Pitts (tight end, senior); Ethan Chang (placekicker, sophomore)
- CAA Second Team Defense – Carl Fowler (defensive lineman, senior); Isaiah Jones (linebacker, senior); Jalen Jones (cornerback, freshman)

== NFL Draft selections ==
= Pro Football Hall of Fame	= Canadian Football Hall of Fame	= College Football Hall of Fame

NFL Draft Selections

Year	Round	Pick	Overall	Name	Team	Position
2023	5	18	152	Colby Sorsdal	Detroit Lions	Offensive tackle
