= 2022 Richmond Spiders football team =

American college football season

2022 Richmond Spiders football

NCAA Division I Second Round, L 31–38 vs. Sacramento State
- Conference: Colonial Athletic Association

Ranking
- STATS: No. 11
- FCS Coaches: No. 12
- Record: 9–4 (6–2 CAA)
- Head coach: Russ Huesman (6th season)
- Offensive coordinator: Billy Cosh (1st season)
- Defensive coordinator: Justin Wood (3rd season)
- Home stadium: E. Claiborne Robins Stadium

2022 Colonial Athletic Association football standings
	Conf.			Overall
Team	W		L	W		L
No. 8 William & Mary +^	7	–	1	11	–	2
No. 13 New Hampshire +^	7	–	1	9	–	4
No. 11 Richmond ^	6	–	2	9	–	4
No. 17 Elon ^	6	–	2	8	–	4
Rhode Island	5	–	3	7	–	4
No. 19 Delaware ^	4	–	4	8	–	5
Towson	4	–	4	6	–	5
Villanova	4	–	4	6	–	5
Monmouth	3	–	5	5	–	6
Albany	2	–	6	3	–	8
Maine	2	–	6	2	–	9
Hampton	1	–	7	4	–	7
Stony Brook	1	–	7	2	–	9
+ – Conference co-champions; ^ – FCS playoff participant; Rankings from STATS Poll

The 2022 Richmond Spiders football team represented the University of Richmond as a member of the Colonial Athletic Association (CAA) in the 2022 NCAA Division I FCS football season. The Spiders, led by sixth-year head coach Russ Huesman, played their home games at E. Claiborne Robins Stadium.

== Preseason ==
Following the graduation of four-year starting quarterback Joe Mancuso, the Spiders brought in graduate transfer Reece Udinski from Maryland to lead the team in 2022. Udinski, who formerly played at VMI, reunites with his former teammate Jakob Herres at wide receiver.

=== CAA poll ===
In the CAA preseason poll released on July 28, 2022, the Spiders were predicted to finish in fourth place out of 13 teams following the departure of James Madison and the addition of Monmouth and Hampton for the 2022 season.

Predicted finish	Team	Votes (1st place)
1	Villanova	270 (16)
2	Delaware	235 (7)
3	Rhode Island	224
4	Richmond	219
5	William & Mary	206 (2)
6	Elon	191 (1)
7	Stony Brook	151
8	Maine	134
9	New Hampshire	117
10	Monmouth	105
11	Towson	81
12	Albany	64
13	Hampton	31

=== Preseason All-CAA team ===
Junior linebacker Tristan Wheeler and senior kick returner Aaron Dykes were named to the CAA preseason all-conference team.

== Schedule ==
Date	Time	Opponent	Rank	Site	TV	Result	Attendance
September 3	12:30 p.m.	at Virginia*	No. 24	Scott Stadium; Charlotteville, VA	ACCRSN	L 17–34	41,122
September 10	5:30 p.m.	Saint Francis*		E. Claiborne Robins Stadium; Richmond, VA	FloSports/NBCS WA	W 31–21	6,388
September 17	noon	at Lehigh*		Goodman Stadium; Bethlehem, PA	ESPN+	W 30–6	6,178
September 24	2:00 p.m.	Stony Brook	No. 22	E. Claiborne Robins Stadium; Richmond, VA	FloSports/NBCS WA	W 51–7	7,618
October 1	2:00 p.m.	at No. 23 Elon	No. 17	Rhodes Stadium; Elon, NC	FloSports	L 27–30 ^{2OT}	9,243
October 15	3:30 p.m.	No. 17 Villanova	No. 21	E. Claiborne Robins Stadium; Richmond, VA	FloSports/MASN	W 20–10	7,830
October 22	2:00 p.m.	at Hampton	No. 19	Armstrong Stadium; Hampton, VA	FloSports	W 41–10	
October 29	1:00 p.m.	at Maine	No. 17	Alfond Stadium; Orono, ME	FloSports	W 31–21	4,278
November 5	3:30 p.m.	No. 17 New Hampshire^{†}	No. 14	E. Claiborne Robins Stadium; Richmond, VA	FloSports/MASN	W 40–34	6,329
November 12	1:00 p.m.	at No. 17 Delaware	No. 12	Delaware Stadium; Newark, DE	FloSports	W 21–13	16,534
November 19	noon	No. 8 William & Mary	No. 11	E. Claiborne Robins Stadium; Richmond, VA (Capital Cup)	FloSports/NBCS WA	L 26–37	8,200
November 26	2:00 p.m.	Davidson*	No. 13	E. Claiborne Robins Stadium; Richmond, VA (NCAA Division I First Round)	ESPN+	W 41–0	3,000
December 3	5:00 p.m.	at No. 2 Sacramento State*	No. 13	Hornet Stadium; Sacramento, CA (NCAA Division I Second Round)	ESPN+	L 31–38	9,136
*Non-conference game; ^{†}Homecoming; Rankings from STATS Poll released prior to the game; All times are in Eastern time

== Game summaries ==
=== At Virginia ===
	1	2	3	4	Total
No. 24 Spiders	7	3	7	0	17
Cavaliers	14	14	0	6	34

=== Saint Francis ===
	1	2	3	4	Total
Red Flash	6	7	0	8	21
Spiders	0	14	3	14	31

=== At Lehigh ===
	1	2	3	4	Total
Spiders	7	13	7	3	30
Mountain Hawks	0	0	6	0	6

=== Stony Brook ===
	1	2	3	4	Total
Seawolves	7	0	0	0	7
No. 22 Spiders	7	28	14	2	51

=== At No. 23 Elon ===
	1	2	3	4	OT	2OT	Total
No. 17 Spiders	7	7	3	0	7	3	27
No. 23 Phoenix	14	0	0	3	7	6	30

=== No. 17 Villanova ===
	1	2	3	4	Total
No. 17 Wildcats	7	3	0	0	10
No. 21 Spiders	0	14	0	6	20

=== At Hampton ===
	1	2	3	4	Total
No. 19 Spiders	10	14	7	10	41
Pirates	0	10	0	0	10

=== At Maine ===
	1	2	3	4	Total
No. 17 Spiders	21	0	7	3	31
Black Bears	0	7	0	14	21

=== No. 17 New Hampshire ===
	1	2	3	4	Total
No. 17 Wildcats	0	7	20	7	34
No. 14 Spiders	7	17	13	3	40

=== At No. 17 Delaware ===
	1	2	3	4	Total
No. 12 Spiders	3	3	3	12	21
No. 17 Fightin' Blue Hens	0	0	0	13	13

=== No. 8 William & Mary ===
	1	2	3	4	Total
No. 8 Tribe	7	10	14	6	37
No. 11 Spiders	6	7	7	6	26

== FCS Playoffs ==
=== Davidson - First Round ===
	1	2	3	4	Total
Wildcats	0	0	0	0	0
No. 13 Spiders	10	17	7	7	41

=== At No. 2 Sacramento State - Second Round ===
	1	2	3	4	Total
No. 13 Spiders	14	7	10	0	31
No. 2 Hornets	7	10	7	14	38

== Ranking movements ==
Ranking movements Legend: ██ Increase in ranking ██ Decrease in ranking RV = Received votes т = Tied with team above or below
	Week													
Poll	Pre	1	2	3	4	5	6	7	8	9	10	11	12	Final
STATS FCS	24	RV	RV	22	17	23	21	19	17	14	12	11	13	11
Coaches	24T	RV	RV	24T	22	RV	25	21	20	14	13	11	14	12
