= 2022 Monmouth Hawks football team =

American college football season

2022 Monmouth Hawks football
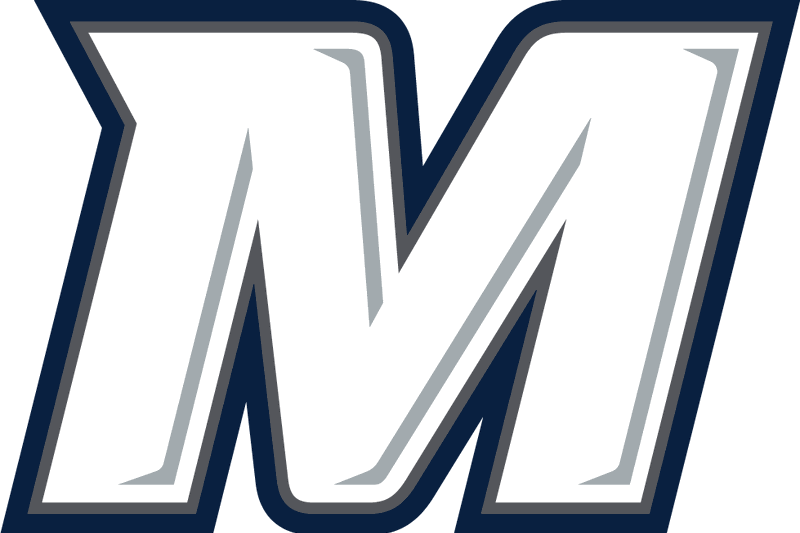
- Conference: Colonial Athletic Association
- Record: 5–6 (3–5 CAA)
- Head coach: Kevin Callahan (30th season)
- Offensive coordinator: Jeff Gallo (4th season)
- Offensive scheme: Air raid
- Defensive coordinator: Andy Bobik (29th season)
- Base defense: 4–3
- Home stadium: Kessler Stadium

2022 Colonial Athletic Association football standings
	Conf.			Overall
Team	W		L	W		L
No. 8 William & Mary +^	7	–	1	11	–	2
No. 13 New Hampshire +^	7	–	1	9	–	4
No. 11 Richmond ^	6	–	2	9	–	4
No. 17 Elon ^	6	–	2	8	–	4
Rhode Island	5	–	3	7	–	4
No. 19 Delaware ^	4	–	4	8	–	5
Towson	4	–	4	6	–	5
Villanova	4	–	4	6	–	5
Monmouth	3	–	5	5	–	6
Albany	2	–	6	3	–	8
Maine	2	–	6	2	–	9
Hampton	1	–	7	4	–	7
Stony Brook	1	–	7	2	–	9
+ – Conference co-champions; ^ – FCS playoff participant; Rankings from STATS Poll

The 2022 Monmouth Hawks football team represented the Monmouth University during the 2022 NCAA Division I FCS football season. The Hawks played their home games at the Kessler Stadium in West Long Branch, New Jersey. The team was coached by 30th-year head coach Kevin Callahan.

== Schedule ==
Date	Time	Opponent	Site	TV	Result	Attendance
September 1	7:00 p.m.	at New Hampshire	Wildcat Stadium; Durham, NH	FloSports	L 21–31	8,703
September 10	1:00 p.m.	Fordham*	Kessler Stadium; West Long Branch, NJ	FloSports	L 49–52	2,785
September 17	1:00 p.m.	Georgetown*	Kessler Stadium; West Long Branch, NJ	FloSports	W 45–6	2,589
September 24	3:30 p.m.	at No. 9 Villanova	Villanova Stadium; Villanova, PA	FloSports	W 49–42	12,001
October 1	12:00 p.m.	at Lehigh*	Goodman Stadium; Bethlehem, PA	ESPN+	W 35–7	2,923
October 8	1:00 p.m.	Albany	Kessler Stadium; West Long Branch, NJ	FloSports	W 38–31	2,532
October 15	1:00 p.m.	at Maine	Alfond Stadium; Orono, ME	FloSports	L 28–38	6,241
October 22	1:00 p.m.	No. 22 Rhode Island^{†}	Kessler Stadium; West Long Branch, NJ	FloSports	L 46–48 ^{7OT}	3,478
October 29	1:00 p.m.	Towson	Kessler Stadium; West Long Branch, NJ	FloSports	L 48–52	3,729
November 5	1:00 p.m.	at No. 18 Delaware	Delaware Stadium; Newark, DE	FloSports	L 17–49	16,385
November 19	12:00 p.m.	Stony Brook	Kessler Stadium; West Long Branch, NJ	FloSports	W 24–21	
*Non-conference game; ^{†}Homecoming; Rankings from STATS Poll released prior to the game; All times are in Eastern time

== Game summaries ==
=== At New Hampshire ===
	1	2	3	4	Total
Hawks	7	7	7	0	21
Wildcats	7	10	0	14	31

=== Fordham ===
	1	2	3	4	Total
Rams	7	21	10	14	52
Hawks	20	6	9	14	49

=== Georgetown ===
	1	2	3	4	Total
Hoyas	3	3	0	0	6
Hawks	14	7	7	17	45

=== At No. 9 Villanova ===
	1	2	3	4	Total
Hawks	7	14	7	21	49
No. 9 Wildcats	7	7	14	14	42

=== At Lehigh ===
	1	2	3	4	Total
Hawks	7	14	14	0	35
Mountain Hawks	0	0	7	0	7

=== Albany ===
	1	2	3	4	Total
Great Danes	7	3	7	14	31
Hawks	14	10	7	7	38

=== At Maine ===
	1	2	3	4	Total
Hawks	7	7	6	8	28
Black Bears	7	14	14	3	38

=== No. 22 Rhode Island ===
Game Seven – No. 22 Rhode Island Rams (4–2) vs Monmouth Hawks (4–3)

Quarter	1	2	3	4	OT	2OT	3OT	4OT	5OT	6OT	7OT	Total
No. 22 Rhode Island	7	14	7	7	7	0	2	0	0	2	2	48
Monmouth	14	10	3	8	7	0	2	0	0	2	0	46

at Kessler Stadium • West Long Branch, New Jersey

- Date: Saturday, October 22, 2022
- Game time: 1:00 p.m. EST
- Game weather: Temperature: 64 °F (18 °C) • Weather: Sunny
- Game attendance: 3,478
- Referee: Jeff Pumphry
- TV: FloSports

Game information

First quarter

- (7:05) URI – Marques DeShields 5 Yd Pass, Harrison Leonard Kick (Rhode Island 7–0)
- (6:23) MON – Dymere Miller 13 Yd Pass, Eric Bernstein Kick (Tied 7–7)
- (1:58) MON – Ugo Obasi 28 Yd Pass, Eric Bernstein Kick (Monmouth 7–14)

Second quarter

- (13:42) URI – Ed Lee 10 Yd Pass, Harrison Leonard Kick (Tied 14–14)
- (9:03) MON – Jaden Shirden 13 Yd Run, Eric Bernstein Kick (Monmouth 14–21)
- (8:14) URI – Kasim Hill 1 Yd Run, Harrison Leonard Kick (Tied 21–21)
- (0:00) MON – Eric Bernstein 26 Yd Field Goal (Monmouth 21–24)

Third quarter

- (10:35) URI – Marques DeShields 3 Yd Run, Harrison Leonard Kick (Rhode Island 28–24)
- (6:23) MON – Eric Bernstein 29 Yd Field Goal (Rhode Island 28–27)

Fourth quarter

- (5:08) MON – Darrion Carrington 34 Yd Pass, Darrion Carrington 2PT Conversion (Monmouth 28–35)
- (3:23) URI – Marques DeShields 73 Yd Pass, Harrison Leonard Kick (Tied 35–35)

First Overtime

- MON – Owen Wright 1 Yd Run, Eric Bernstein Kick (Monmouth 35–42)
- URI – Marques DeShields 1 Yd Run, Harrison Leonard Kick (Tied 42–42)

Second Overtime

no scoring

Third Overtime

- MON – 2PT Conversion (Monmouth 42–44)
- URI – 2PT Conversion (Tied 44–44)

Fourth Overtime

no scoring

Fifth Overtime

no scoring

Sixth Overtime

- MON – 2PT Conversion (Monmouth 44–46)
- URI – 2PT Conversion (Tied 46–46)

Seventh Overtime

- URI – 2PT Conversion (Rhode Island 48–46)

Statistics	URI	MON
First downs	20	26
Plays–yards	71–530	80–486
Rushes–yards	178	237
Passing yards	352	249
Passing: comp–att–int	14–24–3	18–29–1
Time of possession	28:32	31:28

Team	Category	Player	Statistics
Rhode Island	Passing	Kasim Hill	14/24, 352 yards, 3 TD, 3 INT
Rhode Island	Rushing	Marques DeShields	28 carries, 161 yards, 2 TD
Rhode Island	Receiving	Ed Lee	4 receptions, 120 yards, 1 TD
Monmouth	Passing	Tony Muskett	18/29, 249 yards, 3 TD, 1 INT
Monmouth	Rushing	Jaden Shirden	23 carries, 141 yards, 1 TD
Monmouth	Receiving	Assanti Kearney	5 receptions, 105 yards

=== Towson ===
	1	2	3	4	Total
Tigers	18	10	7	17	52
Hawks	14	6	6	22	48

=== At No. 18 Delaware ===
	1	2	3	4	Total
Hawks	10	0	0	7	17
No. 18 Fightin' Blue Hens	21	21	7	0	49

=== Stony Brook ===
	1	2	3	4	Total
Seawolves	0	7	7	7	21
Hawks	14	3	0	7	24
