= 2022 Villanova Wildcats football team =

American college football season

2022 Villanova Wildcats football
- Conference: Colonial Athletic Association
- Record: 6–5 (4–4 CAA)
- Head coach: Mark Ferrante (6th season)
- Offensive coordinator: Chris Boden (4th season)
- Offensive scheme: Spread
- Defensive coordinator: Ross Pennypacker (1st season)
- Base defense: Multiple 3–3–5
- Home stadium: Villanova Stadium

2022 Colonial Athletic Association football standings
	Conf.			Overall
Team	W		L	W		L
No. 8 William & Mary +^	7	–	1	11	–	2
No. 13 New Hampshire +^	7	–	1	9	–	4
No. 11 Richmond ^	6	–	2	9	–	4
No. 17 Elon ^	6	–	2	8	–	4
Rhode Island	5	–	3	7	–	4
No. 19 Delaware ^	4	–	4	8	–	5
Towson	4	–	4	6	–	5
Villanova	4	–	4	6	–	5
Monmouth	3	–	5	5	–	6
Albany	2	–	6	3	–	8
Maine	2	–	6	2	–	9
Hampton	1	–	7	4	–	7
Stony Brook	1	–	7	2	–	9
+ – Conference co-champions; ^ – FCS playoff participant; Rankings from STATS Poll

The 2022 Villanova Wildcats football team represented Villanova University as a member of the Colonial Athletic Association (CAA) during the 2022 NCAA Division I FCS football season. It was led by sixth-year head coach Mark Ferrante and played its home games at Villanova Stadium.

== Schedule ==
Date	Time	Opponent	Rank	Site	TV	Result	Attendance
September 2	6:00 p.m.	Lehigh*	No. 6	Villanova Stadium; Villanova, PA	FloSports	W 45–17	6,101
September 10	1:00 p.m.	at LIU*	No. 6	Bethpage Federal Credit Union Stadium; Brookville, NY	NEC Front Row	W 38–21	4,812
September 17	12:00 p.m.	at Army*	No. 7	Michie Stadium; West Point, NY	CBSSN	L 10–49	32,320
September 24	3:30 p.m.	Monmouth	No. 9	Villanova Stadium; Villanova, PA	FloSports	L 42–49	12,001
October 1	1:00 p.m.	at Maine	No. 14	Alfond Stadium; Orono, ME	FloSports	W 45–20	7,168
October 15	3:30 p.m.	at No. 21 Richmond	No. 17	E. Claiborne Robins Stadium; Richmond, VA	FloSports	L 10–20	7,830
October 22	3:30 p.m.	Albany		Villanova Stadium; Villanova, PA	FloSports	W 31–29	6,741
October 29	1:00 p.m.	Hampton		Villanova Stadium; Villanova, PA	FloSports	W 24–10	4,097
November 5	2:00 p.m.	at Towson		Johnny Unitas Stadium; Towson, MD	FloSports	L 3–27	4,057
November 12	1:00 p.m.	at No. 8 William & Mary		Zable Stadium; Williamsburg, VA	FloSports	L 12–45	10,280
November 19	1:00 p.m.	No. 20 Delaware		Villanova Stadium; Villanova, PA (Battle of the Blue)	FloSports	W 29–26	6,451
*Non-conference game; Rankings from STATS Poll released prior to the game; All times are in Eastern time

== Game summaries ==
=== Lehigh ===
	1	2	3	4	Total
Mountain Hawks	0	14	3	0	17
No. 6 Wildcats	3	28	7	7	45

=== At LIU ===
	1	2	3	4	Total
No. 6 Wildcats	3	14	14	7	38
Sharks	0	7	0	14	21

=== At (FBS) Army ===
Villanova Wildcats at Army Black Knights

Quarter	1	2	3	4	Total
No. 7 Wildcats	7	0	3	0	10
(FBS) Black Knights	14	7	7	21	49

at Michie Stadium, West Point, NY

- Date: September 17, 2022
- Game time: 12:00 p.m. EDT
- Game weather: Temperature: 68 °F (20 °C) • Wind: S 7 mph • Weather: Sunny
- Game attendance: 32,320
- Referee: Darryl Deberry
- TV announcers (CBSSN): Dave Ryan (play-by-play), Ross Tucker (analyst) & Tina Cervasio (sideline)
- ESPN – Villanova Wildcats at Army Black Knights /// Box Score, Villanova at Army /// Army Pregame Notes /// Villanova Pregame Notes /// Postgame Notes

Game information

First quarter

- (10:50) ARMY TD – Tyhier Tyler 7-yard rush, Quinn Maretzki kick
  Drive: 5 plays, 68 yards, 2:15; Army 7–0
- (05:27) VIL TD – Rayjuon Pringle 5-yard pass from Connor Watkins, Matthew Mercurio kick
  Drive: 11 plays, 75 yards, 5:23; Tied 7–7
- (01:20) ARMY TD – Tyhier Tyler 23-yard rush, Quinn Maretzki kick
  Drive: 8 plays, 66 yards, 4:03; Army 14–7

Second quarter

- (05:12) ARMY TD – Cade Ballard 6-yard rush, Quinn Maretzki kick
  Drive: 9 plays, 80 yards, 4:42; Army 21–7

Third quarter

- (13:11) ARMY TD – Tyson Riley 70-yard rush, Quinn Maretzki kick
  Drive: 3 plays, 76 yards, 1:43; Army 28–7
- (08:27) VIL FG – Matthew Mercurio 40-yard field goal
  Drive: 11 plays, 50 yards, 4:38; Army 28–10

Fourth quarter

- (14:56) ARMY TD – Tyhier Tyler 3-yard rush, Quinn Maretzki kick
  Drive: 14 plays, 75 yards, 8:31; Army 35–10
- (12:53) ARMY TD – Tyrell Robinson 73-yard punt return, Quinn Maretzki kick
  Drive: 0 plays, 0 yards, 0:00; Army 42–10
- (04:29) ARMY TD – Hayden Reed 24-yard rush, Trey Gronotte kick
  Drive: 6 plays, 56 yards, 3:14; Army 49–10

Passing

- VIL – Connor Watkins: 12/21, 74 yards, 1 TD, 2 INT
- ARMY – Cade Ballard: 0/1, 0 yards

Rushing

- VIL – Connor Watkins: 10 carries, 60 yards
- ARMY – Tyson Riley: 21 carries, 158 yards, 1 TD

Receiving

- VIL – Rayjuon Pringle: 6 receptions, 54 yards, 1 TD
- ARMY – No Receptions

Defense

- VIL – Timmy Furgeson: 8 total tackles (3 solo, 5 assisted)
- ARMY – Leo Lowin: 7 total tackles (4 solo, 3 assisted)

Statistics	VIL	ARMY
First downs	15	20
3rd down efficiency	1–9	4–10
4th down efficiency	2–3	3–3
Plays–yards	57–247	56–472
Rushes–yards	35–173	55–472
Passing yards	74	0
Passing: Comp–Att–Int	12–22–2	0–1–0
Penalties–yards	7–55	7–80
Turnovers	2	0
Time of possession	29:17	30:43

=== Monmouth ===
	1	2	3	4	Total
Hawks	7	14	7	21	49
No. 9 Wildcats	7	7	14	14	42

=== At Maine ===
	1	2	3	4	Total
No. 14 Wildcats	10	21	7	7	45
Black Bears	7	7	0	6	20

=== At No. 21 Richmond ===
	1	2	3	4	Total
No. 17 Wildcats	7	3	0	0	10
No. 21 Spiders	0	14	0	6	20

=== Albany ===
	1	2	3	4	Total
Great Danes	0	7	9	13	29
Wildcats	7	14	0	10	31

=== Hampton ===
	1	2	3	4	Total
Pirates	0	3	7	0	10
Wildcats	7	3	7	7	24

=== At Towson ===
	1	2	3	4	Total
Wildcats	3	0	0	0	3
Tigers	0	10	3	14	27

=== At No. 8 William & Mary ===
	1	2	3	4	Total
Wildcats	3	3	0	6	12
No. 8 Tribe	14	14	10	7	45

=== No. 20 Delaware ===
	1	2	3	4	Total
No. 20 Fightin' Blue Hens	7	9	7	3	26
Wildcats	7	7	7	8	29
