= 2022 Maine Black Bears football team =

American college football season

2022 Maine Black Bears football
- Conference: Colonial Athletic Association
- Record: 2–9 (2–6 CAA)
- Head coach: Jordan Stevens (1st season)
- Offensive coordinator: Andrew Dresner (4th season)
- Defensive coordinator: Jared Keyte (1st season)
- Home stadium: Alfond Stadium

2022 Colonial Athletic Association football standings
| | Conf. | | | Overall |
| Team | W | | L | W | | L |
|---|---|---|---|---|---|---|
| No. 8 William & Mary +^ | 7 | – | 1 | 11 | – | 2 |
| No. 13 New Hampshire +^ | 7 | – | 1 | 9 | – | 4 |
| No. 11 Richmond ^ | 6 | – | 2 | 9 | – | 4 |
| No. 17 Elon ^ | 6 | – | 2 | 8 | – | 4 |
| Rhode Island | 5 | – | 3 | 7 | – | 4 |
| No. 19 Delaware ^ | 4 | – | 4 | 8 | – | 5 |
| Towson | 4 | – | 4 | 6 | – | 5 |
| Villanova | 4 | – | 4 | 6 | – | 5 |
| Monmouth | 3 | – | 5 | 5 | – | 6 |
| Albany | 2 | – | 6 | 3 | – | 8 |
| Maine | 2 | – | 6 | 2 | – | 9 |
| Hampton | 1 | – | 7 | 4 | – | 7 |
| Stony Brook | 1 | – | 7 | 2 | – | 9 |
+ – Conference co-champions; ^ – FCS playoff participant; Rankings from STATS Poll

The 2022 Maine Black Bears football team represented the University of Maine as a member of the Colonial Athletic Association (CAA) in the 2022 NCAA Division I FCS football season. The Black Bears, led by first-year head coach Jordan Stevens, played their home games at Alfond Stadium.

== Transfers ==
=== Outgoing ===
Over the off-season, Maine lost twelve players through the transfer portal. Nine are currently committed while the remainder are still actively pursuing new schools.

| Name | Pos. | New school |
|---|---|---|
| David Gelb | P | Charleston Southern |
| Fofie Bazzie | S | Charleston |
| Jack Corcoran | TE | Unknown |
| Chris Glass | DT | UMass |
| Logan Martin | WR | Husson |
| Joey McCracken | QB | Shippensburg |
| Richie Pekmezian | K | Edinboro |
| Kolubah Pewee, Jr. | CB | Georgetown |
| Larry St. Pierre, Jr. | RB | Unknown |
| Devin Young | WR | Sacred Heart |

=== Incoming ===
Over the off-season, Maine added six players through the transfer portal.

| Name | Pos. | Class | Previous school |
|---|---|---|---|
| Terrence Ganyi | LB | JR | UConn |
| Braeden Heald | WR | GR | Northwestern |
| Cooper Heisey | TE | JR | Rutgers |
| Bailey Timms | P | GR | La Trobe University |
| Kobay White | WR | SR | Boston College |
| Cody Williams | K | SR | Portland State |

== Schedule ==
| Date | Time | Opponent | Site | TV | Result | Attendance |
|---|---|---|---|---|---|---|
| September 3 | 8:00 p.m. | at New Mexico* | University Stadium; Albuquerque, NM | | L 0–41 | 15,166 |
| September 10 | 1:00 p.m. | Colgate* | Alfond Stadium; Orono, ME | FloSports | L 18–21 | 5,295 |
| September 17 | 7:30 p.m. | at Boston College* | Alumni Stadium; Chestnut Hill, MA | ACCRSN | L 17–38 | 34,325 |
| October 1 | 1:00 p.m. | No. 14 Villanova | Alfond Stadium; Orono, ME | FloSports | L 20–45 | 7,168 |
| October 8 | 2:00 p.m. | at Hampton | Armstrong Stadium; Hampton, VA | FloSports | W 31–24 | 4,512 |
| October 15 | 1:00 p.m. | Monmouth^{†} | Alfond Stadium; Orono, ME | FloSports | W 38–28 | 6,241 |
| October 22 | 3:30 p.m. | at Stony Brook | Kenneth P. LaValle Stadium; Stony Brook, NY | FloSports | L 27–28 | 7,174 |
| October 29 | 1:00 p.m. | No. 17 Richmond | Alfond Stadium; Orono, ME | FloSports | L 21–31 | 4,278 |
| November 5 | 1:00 p.m. | at No. 23 Rhode Island | Meade Stadium; Kingston, RI | FloSports | L 22–26 | 4,377 |
| November 12 | 12:00 p.m. | at Albany | Bob Ford Field at Tom & Mary Casey Stadium; Albany, NY | FloSports | L 21–23 | 2,301 |
| November 19 | 12:00 p.m. | No. 18 New Hampshire | Alfond Stadium; Orono, ME (Battle for the Brice–Cowell Musket) | FloSports | L 41–42 ^{OT} | 4,638 |
*Non-conference game; ^{†}Homecoming; Rankings from STATS Poll released prior to the game; All times are in Eastern time

== Roster ==
2022 Maine Black Bears football team roster
Players
Coaches
Offense

| Pos. | # | Name | Class |
|---|---|---|---|
| QB | 1 | Joe Fagnano | Sr |
| RB | 2 | Elijah Barnwell | Sr |
| WR | 5 | Kobay White | Sr |
| WR | 10 | Tyrese Baptiste | Fr |
| QB | 11 | Ayden Pereira | Fr |
| WR | 12 | Braeden Heald | Sr |
| QB | 13 | Derek Robertson | So |
| QB | 14 | Anthony Harris | So |
| WR | 15 | Zaheem Crawford-Patterson | Fr |
| WR | 17 | Zavier Scott | Sr |
| TE | 18 | Shawn Bowman | Sr |
| QB | 19 | Jack Kelley | Fr |
| RB | 25 | Tavion Banks | Jr |
| RB | 28 | Freddie Brock | Jr |
| RB | 29 | Garrison Burnett | Sr |
| WR | 34 | Daren Omoregie | Fr |
| RB | 35 | Stone Compton | So |
| RB | 36 | Symon Sathler | Fr |
| RB | 37 | Zachariah Oja | Fr |
| WR | 41 | Aaron Arteaga | Fr |
| TE | 45 | Eli Mahan | Fr |
| RB | 46 | John Gay | Sr |
| TE | 48 | Declan McKevitt | Fr |
| RB | 49 | Evan Wallace | Fr |
| OL | 55 | Darius Bell | Fr |
| OL | 57 | David Gross | So |
| OL | 62 | Michael Gerace | Sr |
| OL | 63 | Jack Webb | Sr |
| OL | 64 | Jack Boutaugh | Fr |
| OL | 65 | Nick Cruji | Fr |
| OL | 67 | Tyler Royal | Sr |
| OL | 68 | Max Gregor | Fr |
| OL | 71 | Tyler Williams | Fr |
| OL | 75 | Sean Pozniak | Fr |
| OL | 76 | Tyrie Francois | Sr |
| OL | 77 | Kevin Jones | Sr |
| OL | 79 | Max Lövblad | Jr |
| WR | 80 | Jamie Lamson | Jr |
| WR | 81 | Montigo Moss | Jr |
| TE | 82 | Cooper Heisey | Sr |
| WR | 83 | Michael Monios | Jr |
| WR | 84 | Trevin Ewing | Jr |
| TE | 85 | Matt Toman | So |
| TE | 86 | Antonio Corsi | Fr |
| WR | 87 | Jacob Hennie | Sr |
| TE | 88 | Rohan Jones | Fr |
| WR | 89 | Gianni Rossitto | Fr |
| TE | 92 | Francisco Pratts | Fr |

Defense

| Pos. | # | Name | Class |
|---|---|---|---|
| LB | 0 | Vince Thomas | So |
| CB | 3 | Benito Speight | Sr |
| DT | 4 | Justin Sambu | Sr |
| DT | 5 | Josh Lezin | Sr |
| LB | 6 | Adrian Otero | Sr |
| LB | 7 | Xavier Nurse | Jr |
| S | 8 | Robby Riobe | Jr |
| DE | 9 | Jamehl Wiley | Sr |
| DE | 11 | Khairi Manns | Jr |
| CB | 13 | Daniel Doegan | Fr |
| S | 14 | Harvey Clayton Jr. | Sr |
| LB | 15 | Brian Lee Jr. | Sr |
| DE | 16 | Xavier Mitchell | Sr |
| S | 20 | Jylun Spence | Fr |
| S | 21 | Austin Ambush | Jr |
| CB | 22 | Jabari Echols | Fr |
| S | 23 | Shakur Smalls | So |
| CB | 24 | Aaron Gethers | Jr |
| S | 26 | Jamond DuBose | Sr |
| CB | 27 | Jamaree Gibson | Fr |
| CB | 30 | Kahzir Brown | So |
| LB | 31 | Terrence Ganyi | Jr |
| LB | 32 | Jaylen Long | Fr |
| LB | 33 | Christian Thomas | So |
| CB | 35 | Navonn Barrett | Fr |
| S | 37 | Luca Gebhard | Fr |
| S | 38 | Sherrod Hudson | Fr |
| LB | 40 | Tyshawn Stewart | So |
| LB | 41 | Devin Hairston | Fr |
| S | 42 | Abdul Stewart | So |
| DT | 44 | Raffaele Salamone | Sr |
| LB | 47 | Darius McKenzie | So |
| DB | 48 | Nic Swanson | Fr |
| DB | 49 | Nassir Young | Fr |
| LB | 50 | Latrell Couchman | Fr |
| DT | 52 | John Costanza | Jr |
| LB | 53 | Isaac Ofielu | Fr |
| LB | 54 | Zion Cheeks | Fr |
| DE | 56 | Jacob Tuiasosopo | Jr |
| DT | 58 | Thomas Horton | Fr |
| DE | 90 | Xavier Holmes | Fr |
| DT | 91 | Shymell Davis | Fr |
| DT | 95 | Michael Hamilton | Fr |
| DT | 96 | Dorian Royal | So |
| DE | 97 | Elijah Alexander | Fr |
| DE | 99 | Nicolas Kalume | Fr |

Special teams

| Pos. | # | Name | Class |
|---|---|---|---|
| LS/LB | 43 | Charles Eberle | So |
| K/P | 51 | Joey Bryson | Fr |
| K/P | 59 | Cody Williams | Sr |
| P/K | 93 | Brian Cooey | Sr |
| LS | 94 | Clayton Ritter | Fr |
| P | 95 | Bailey Timms | Sr |
| K/P | 98 | Cole Baker | Fr |

Head coach

- Jordan Stevens (Maine)

Coordinators/assistant coaches

- Andrew Dresner (Union)
  Offensive coordinator/quarterbacks
- Jared Keyte (Utica)
  Defensive coordinator/linebackers
- Justin Flores (Maine)
  Wide receivers/recruiting coordinator
- Mikahael Waters (Nevada)
  Tight ends/Asst. Special Team Coord./Pro Liaison
- Patrick Kugler (Michigan)
  Offensive line
- Bryan Anthony Murray (Boston College)
  Defensive line
- Tom McEntire (Thiel)
  Defensive backs
- Jimmy Walsh (Bates)
  Special teams coordinator/cornerbacks
- Spencer Carey (Maine)
  Outside linebackers
- Pushaun Brown (Maine)
  Running backs
- Thomas Hanscom (Maine)
  Director of football operations
- Jon Lynch (Westfield State)
  Director of sports performance
- Trey Hall (Edinboro)
  Head football sports performance coach
- Jessica Bishop
  Athletic academic counselor – tutor/mentor coordinator
- Kristin Gilmour
  Athletic academic counselor
- Mark Puleo
  Assistant equipment manager

Legend

- (C) Team captain
- (S) Suspended
- (I) Ineligible
- Injured
- Redshirt

Roster
Last update: July 9, 2021

== Game summaries ==
=== At New Mexico ===
| | 1 | 2 | 3 | 4 | Total |
|---|---|---|---|---|---|
| Black Bears | 0 | 0 | 0 | 0 | 0 |
| Lobos | 0 | 21 | 13 | 7 | 41 |

=== Colgate ===
| | 1 | 2 | 3 | 4 | Total |
|---|---|---|---|---|---|
| Raiders | 0 | 7 | 7 | 7 | 21 |
| Black Bears | 0 | 0 | 3 | 15 | 18 |

=== At Boston College ===
| | 1 | 2 | 3 | 4 | Total |
|---|---|---|---|---|---|
| Black Bears | 10 | 0 | 7 | 0 | 17 |
| Eagles | 14 | 14 | 3 | 7 | 38 |

=== No. 14 Villanova ===
| | 1 | 2 | 3 | 4 | Total |
|---|---|---|---|---|---|
| No. 14 Wildcats | 10 | 21 | 7 | 7 | 45 |
| Black Bears | 7 | 7 | 0 | 6 | 20 |

=== At Hampton ===
| | 1 | 2 | 3 | 4 | Total |
|---|---|---|---|---|---|
| Black Bears | 7 | 10 | 0 | 14 | 31 |
| Pirates | 14 | 0 | 10 | 0 | 24 |

=== Monmouth ===
| | 1 | 2 | 3 | 4 | Total |
|---|---|---|---|---|---|
| Hawks | 7 | 7 | 6 | 8 | 28 |
| Black Bears | 7 | 14 | 14 | 3 | 38 |

=== At Stony Brook ===
| | 1 | 2 | 3 | 4 | Total |
|---|---|---|---|---|---|
| Black Bears | 3 | 17 | 7 | 0 | 27 |
| Seawolves | 7 | 0 | 14 | 7 | 28 |

=== No. 17 Richmond ===
| | 1 | 2 | 3 | 4 | Total |
|---|---|---|---|---|---|
| No. 17 Spiders | 21 | 0 | 7 | 3 | 31 |
| Black Bears | 0 | 7 | 0 | 14 | 21 |

=== At No. 23 Rhode Island ===
| | 1 | 2 | 3 | 4 | Total |
|---|---|---|---|---|---|
| Black Bears | 3 | 10 | 6 | 3 | 22 |
| No. 23 Rams | 21 | 21 | 7 | 0 | 49 |

=== At Albany ===
| | 1 | 2 | 3 | 4 | Total |
|---|---|---|---|---|---|
| Black Bears | 7 | 0 | 7 | 7 | 21 |
| Great Danes | 0 | 10 | 7 | 6 | 23 |

=== No. 18 New Hampshire ===
| | 1 | 2 | 3 | 4 | OT | Total |
|---|---|---|---|---|---|---|
| No. 18 Wildcats | 7 | 14 | 7 | 7 | 7 | 42 |
| Black Bears | 0 | 14 | 7 | 14 | 6 | 41 |
