= 2022 Stony Brook Seawolves football team =

American college football season

2022 Stony Brook Seawolves football
- Conference: Colonial Athletic Association
- Record: 2–9 (1–7 CAA)
- Head coach: Chuck Priore (17th season)
- Co-offensive coordinator: Chris Bache (8th season)
- Defensive coordinator: Rob Noel (3rd season)
- Home stadium: Kenneth P. LaValle Stadium

2022 Colonial Athletic Association football standings
	Conf.			Overall
Team	W		L	W		L
No. 8 William & Mary +^	7	–	1	11	–	2
No. 13 New Hampshire +^	7	–	1	9	–	4
No. 11 Richmond ^	6	–	2	9	–	4
No. 17 Elon ^	6	–	2	8	–	4
Rhode Island	5	–	3	7	–	4
No. 19 Delaware ^	4	–	4	8	–	5
Towson	4	–	4	6	–	5
Villanova	4	–	4	6	–	5
Monmouth	3	–	5	5	–	6
Albany	2	–	6	3	–	8
Maine	2	–	6	2	–	9
Hampton	1	–	7	4	–	7
Stony Brook	1	–	7	2	–	9
+ – Conference co-champions; ^ – FCS playoff participant; Rankings from STATS Poll

The 2022 Stony Brook Seawolves football team represented the Stony Brook University as a member of the Colonial Athletic Association (CAA) during the 2022 NCAA Division I FCS football season. The Seawolves, led by 17th-year head coach Chuck Priore, played their home games at Kenneth P. LaValle Stadium.

== Schedule ==
Date	Time	Opponent	Site	TV	Result	Attendance
September 1	7:00 p.m.	No. 22 Rhode Island	Kenneth P. LaValle Stadium; Stony Brook, NY	FloSports	L 14–35	7,101
September 17	3:30 p.m.	at UMass*	Warren McGuirk Alumni Stadium; Hadley, MA	ESPN3	L 3–20	10,011
September 24	2:00 p.m.	at No. 22 Richmond	E. Claiborne Robins Stadium; Richmond, VA	FloSports	L 7–51	7,618
October 1	3:30 p.m.	No. 18 William & Mary	Kenneth P. LaValle Stadium; Stony Brook, NY	FloSports	L 10–27	3,581
October 8	3:30 p.m.	at New Hampshire	Wildcat Stadium; Durham, NH	FloSports	L 14–24	13,273
October 15	6:00 p.m.	at No. 22 Fordham*	Coffey Field; Bronx, NY	SNY, ESPN+	L 14–45	1,914
October 22	3:30 p.m.	Maine^{†}	Kenneth P. LaValle Stadium; Stony Brook, NY	FloSports	W 28–27	7,714
October 29	1:00 p.m.	at Albany	Bob Ford Field at Tom & Mary Casey Stadium; Albany, NY (rivalry)	FloSports	L 14–59	
November 5	1:00 p.m.	Morgan State*	Kenneth P. LaValle Stadium; Stony Brook, NY	FloSports	W 24–22	4,502
November 12	1:00 p.m.	Towson	Kenneth P. LaValle Stadium; Stony Brook, NY	FloSports	L 17–21	3,513
November 19	12:00 p.m.	at Monmouth	Kessler Stadium; West Long Branch, NJ	FloSports	L 21–24	
*Non-conference game; ^{†}Homecoming; Rankings from STATS Poll released prior to the game; All times are in Eastern time

== Game summaries ==
=== No. 22 Rhode Island ===
Game One – No. 22 Rhode Island Rams (0–0) vs Stony Brook Seawolves (0–0)

Quarter	1	2	3	4	Total
No. 22 Rhode Island	7	7	7	14	35
Stony Brook	7	7	0	0	14

at Kenneth P. LaValle Stadium • Stony Brook, New York

- Date: Thursday, September 1, 2022
- Game time: 7:00 p.m. EST
- Game weather: Temperature: 79 °F (26 °C) • Weather: Sunny
- Game attendance: 7,101
- Referee: Henry Wimberg

Game information

First quarter

- (10:14) STBK – Carthell Flowers-LLoyd 20 Yd Fumble Return, Angelo Guglielmello Kick (Stony Brook 7–0)
- (2:48) URI – Paul Woods 7 Yd Pass, Michael DeBolt Kick (Tied 7–7)

Second quarter

- (10:50) URI – Jordan Jones 35 Yd Interception Return, Michael DeBolt Kick (Rhode Island 14–7)
- (0:50) STBK – Ty Son Lawton 2 Yd Run, Angelo Guglielmello Kick (Tied 14–14)

Third quarter

- (3:31) URI – Ed Lee 32 Yd Pass, Michael DeBolt Kick (Rhode Island 21–14)

Fourth quarter

- (12:24) URI – Kasim Hill 10 Yd Run, Michael DeBolt Kick (Rhode Island 28–14)
- (1:35) URI – Marques DeShields 2 Yd Run, Michael DeBolt Kick (Rhode Island 35–14)

Statistics	URI	STBK
First downs	21	15
Plays–yards	67–387	67–250
Rushes–yards	151	167
Passing yards	236	83
Passing: comp–att–int	17–32–0	8–24–3
Time of possession	29:12	30:48

Team	Category	Player	Statistics
Rhode Island	Passing	Kasim Hill	17/32, 236 yards, 2 TD
Rhode Island	Rushing	Jaylen Smith	13 carries, 81 yards
Rhode Island	Receiving	Ed Lee	6 receptions, 87 yards, 1 TD
Stony Brook	Passing	Joshua Zamot	6/16, 74 yards, 1 INT
Stony Brook	Rushing	Joshua Zamot	15 carry, 83 yards
Stony Brook	Receiving	Damien Caffrey	2 receptions, 20 yards

=== At UMass ===
	1	2	3	4	Total
Seawolves	0	3	0	0	3
Minutemen	7	10	3	0	20

=== At No. 22 Richmond ===
	1	2	3	4	Total
Seawolves	7	0	0	0	7
No. 22 Spiders	7	28	14	2	51

=== No. 18 William & Mary ===
	1	2	3	4	Total
No. 18 Tribe	3	3	7	14	27
Seawolves	10	0	0	0	10

=== At New Hampshire ===
	1	2	3	4	Total
Seawolves	0	7	0	7	14
Wildcats	0	10	7	7	24

=== At No. 22 Fordham ===
	1	2	3	4	Total
Seawolves	0	0	0	14	14
No. 22 Rams	7	24	0	14	45

=== Maine ===
	1	2	3	4	Total
Black Bears	3	17	7	0	27
Seawolves	7	0	14	7	28

=== At Albany ===
	1	2	3	4	Total
Seawolves	0	0	0	14	14
Great Danes	21	17	21	0	59

=== Morgan State ===
	1	2	3	4	Total
Bears	7	3	0	12	22
Seawolves	0	7	14	3	24

=== Towson ===
	1	2	3	4	Total
Tigers	7	0	7	7	21
Seawolves	7	0	7	3	17

=== At Monmouth ===
	1	2	3	4	Total
Seawolves	0	7	7	7	21
Hawks	14	3	0	7	24
