= Reese Poffenbarger =

American football player

No. 7
- Position: Quarterback

Personal information
- Listed height: 6 ft 1 in (1.85 m)
- Listed weight: 215 lb (98 kg)

Career information
- High school: Middletown
- College: Old Dominion (2021); Albany (2022–2023); Miami (FL) (2024); North Texas (2025); Akron*)

Awards and highlights
- CAA Offensive Rookie of the Year (2022); ECAC FCS Rookie of the Year (2022); Third-team All-CAA (2022)
- Stats at ESPN

Reese Poffenbarger is a former American college football quarterback. He previously played for the Old Dominion Monarchs, Albany Great Danes, Miami Hurricanes and North Texas Mean Green.

== Early life ==
Poffenbarger attended Middletown High School in Middletown, Maryland. As a senior, he passed for 2,943 yards and 32 touchdowns before committing to play college football at Old Dominion University.

== College career ==
=== Albany ===
Poffenbarger redshirted in 2021 at Old Dominion before deciding to transfer to the University at Albany, SUNY. Entering the 2022 season, Poffenbarger competed with Tyler Szalkowski and Joey Carino for Albany's starting quarterback job, with Poffenbarger being named the starter in the season opener against Baylor. Against Fordham, Poffenbarger threw for 412 yards, setting the school record for single game passing yards. He finished the season throwing for 2,999 yards and 24 touchdowns, earning CAA Offensive Rookie of the Year honors. He was also named a finalist for the Jerry Rice Award. The following season, Poffenbarger led Albany to the FCS semifinals, being named an FCS third-team All-American. After leading the FCS in passing touchdowns (36) and passing yards (3,603), he entered the transfer portal for a second time. He finished his career at Albany as the school's all-time touchdown passes leader.

=== Miami ===
On January 8, 2024, Poffenbarger announced that he would be transferring to the University of Miami to play for the Miami Hurricanes. During the 2024 season, he served as the backup to Cam Ward, appearing in four games, before entering the transfer portal for a third time.

=== North Texas ===
On December 16, 2024, Poffenbarger announced he was transferring to the University of North Texas to play for the North Texas Mean Green.

=== Statistics ===
Season	Team	Games			Passing								Rushing			
Season	Team	GP	GS	Record	Cmp	Att	Pct	Yds	Y/A	TD	Int	Rtg	Att	Yds	Avg	TD
2021	Old Dominion	0	0	—	Redshirted (redshirt)											
2022	Albany	11	11	3–8	227	369	61.5	2,999	8.1	24	4	149.1	104	127	1.2	2
2023	Albany	15	15	11–4	276	471	58.6	3,614	7.7	36	13	142.8	105	183	1.7	6
2024	Miami	4	0	—	6	7	85.7	20	2.9	0	0	109.7	5	12	2.4	0
2025	North Texas	2	0	—	5	7	71.4	36	5.1	0	0	114.6	4	20	5.0	0
Career		32	26	14−12	514	854	60.2	6,669	7.8	60	17	145.0	218	342	1.6	8

== Personal life ==
Poffenbarger's mom played professional basketball, and his sister, Saylor, plays for the Maryland Terrapins women's basketball team.
