= 2022 Towson Tigers football team =

American college football season

2022 Towson Tigers football
- Conference: Colonial Athletic Association
- Record: 6–5 (4–4 CAA)
- Head coach: Rob Ambrose (13th season)
- Defensive coordinator: Eric Daniels (3rd season)
- Home stadium: Johnny Unitas Stadium

2022 Colonial Athletic Association football standings
	Conf.			Overall
Team	W		L	W		L
No. 8 William & Mary +^	7	–	1	11	–	2
No. 13 New Hampshire +^	7	–	1	9	–	4
No. 11 Richmond ^	6	–	2	9	–	4
No. 17 Elon ^	6	–	2	8	–	4
Rhode Island	5	–	3	7	–	4
No. 19 Delaware ^	4	–	4	8	–	5
Towson	4	–	4	6	–	5
Villanova	4	–	4	6	–	5
Monmouth	3	–	5	5	–	6
Albany	2	–	6	3	–	8
Maine	2	–	6	2	–	9
Hampton	1	–	7	4	–	7
Stony Brook	1	–	7	2	–	9
+ – Conference co-champions; ^ – FCS playoff participant; Rankings from STATS Poll

The 2022 Towson Tigers football team represented Towson University as a member of the Colonial Athletic Association (CAA) during the 2022 NCAA Division I FCS football season. They were led by 13th-year head coach Rob Ambrose, and played their home games at Johnny Unitas Stadium in Towson, Maryland. Ambrose was fired at the end of the season, and replaced with interim head coach Lyndon Johnson.

== Schedule ==
Date	Time	Opponent	Site	TV	Result	Attendance
September 3	6:00 p.m.	at Bucknell*	Christy Mathewson–Memorial Stadium; Lewisburg, PA	ESPN+	W 14–13 ^{OT}	1,949
September 10	6:00 p.m.	Morgan State*	Johnny Unitas Stadium; Towson, MD (The Battle for Greater Baltimore)	MPT	W 29–21	9,784
September 17	1:00 p.m.	at West Virginia*	Milan Puskar Stadium; Morgantown, WV	ESPN+	L 7–65	50,703
September 24	4:00 p.m.	New Hampshire	Johnny Unitas Stadium; Towson, MD	FloSports	L 14–37	5,508
October 1	3:00 p.m.	at No. 6 Delaware	Delaware Stadium; Newark, DE	FloSports/NBC Sports Philadelphia	L 10–24	18,905
October 8	2:00 p.m.	at No. 14 Elon	Rhodes Stadium; Elon, NC	FloSports	L 10–27	5,578
October 22	4:00 p.m.	No. 12 William & Mary	Johnny Unitas Stadium; Towson, MD	FloSports	L 24–44	4,445
October 29	1:00 p.m.	at Monmouth	Kessler Stadium; West Long Branch, NJ	FloSports	W 52–48	3,729
November 5	2:00 p.m.	Villanova	Johnny Unitas Stadium; Towson, MD	FloSports	W 27–3	4,057
November 12	1:00 p.m.	at Stony Brook	Kenneth P. LaValle Stadium; Stony Brook, NY	FloSports	W 21–17	
November 19	1:00 p.m.	Hampton	Johnny Unitas Stadium; Towson, MD	FloSports	W 27–7	4,045
*Non-conference game; Rankings from STATS Poll released prior to the game; All times are in Eastern time

== Game summaries ==
=== At Bucknell ===
	1	2	3	4	OT	Total
Tigers	0	0	7	0	7	14
Bison	0	0	0	7	6	13

=== Morgan State ===
	1	2	3	4	Total
Bears	7	7	7	0	21
Tigers	3	10	13	3	29

=== At West Virginia ===
	1	2	3	4	Total
Tigers	7	0	0	0	7
Mountaineers	21	24	6	14	65

=== New Hampshire ===
	1	2	3	4	Total
Wildcats	10	7	14	6	37
Tigers	0	0	14	0	14

=== At No. 6 Delaware ===
	1	2	3	4	Total
Tigers	0	3	0	7	10
No. 6 Fightin' Blue Hens	0	14	7	3	24

=== At No. 14 Elon ===
	1	2	3	4	Total
Tigers	7	0	0	3	10
No. 14 Phoenix	0	14	3	10	27

=== No. 12 William & Mary ===
	1	2	3	4	Total
No. 12 Tribe	14	16	7	7	44
Tigers	3	0	7	14	24

=== At Monmouth ===
	1	2	3	4	Total
Tigers	18	10	7	17	52
Hawks	14	6	6	22	48

=== Villanova ===
	1	2	3	4	Total
Wildcats	3	0	0	0	3
Tigers	0	10	3	14	27

=== At Stony Brook ===
	1	2	3	4	Total
Tigers	7	0	7	7	21
Seawolves	7	0	7	3	17

=== Hampton ===
	1	2	3	4	Total
Pirates	0	7	0	0	7
Tigers	7	10	3	7	27
