= 2022 New Hampshire Wildcats football team =

American college football season

2022 New Hampshire Wildcats football

CAA co-champion

NCAA Division I Second Round, L 19–35 vs. Holy Cross
- Conference: Colonial Athletic Association

Ranking
- STATS: No. 13
- FCS Coaches: No. 15
- Record: 9–4 (7–1 CAA)
- Head coach: Ricky Santos (2nd season)
- Offensive coordinator: Brian Scott (1st season)
- Defensive coordinator: Garrett Gillick (1st season)
- Home stadium: Wildcat Stadium

2022 Colonial Athletic Association football standings
	Conf.			Overall
Team	W		L	W		L
No. 8 William & Mary +^	7	–	1	11	–	2
No. 13 New Hampshire +^	7	–	1	9	–	4
No. 11 Richmond ^	6	–	2	9	–	4
No. 17 Elon ^	6	–	2	8	–	4
Rhode Island	5	–	3	7	–	4
No. 19 Delaware ^	4	–	4	8	–	5
Towson	4	–	4	6	–	5
Villanova	4	–	4	6	–	5
Monmouth	3	–	5	5	–	6
Albany	2	–	6	3	–	8
Maine	2	–	6	2	–	9
Hampton	1	–	7	4	–	7
Stony Brook	1	–	7	2	–	9
+ – Conference co-champions; ^ – FCS playoff participant; Rankings from STATS Poll

The 2022 New Hampshire Wildcats football team represented the University of New Hampshire as a member of the Colonial Athletic Association (CAA) in the 2022 NCAA Division I FCS football season. The Wildcats, led by second-year head coach Ricky Santos, (Note: Santos also served as interim-head coach for the 2019 season.) played their home games at Wildcat Stadium.

== Schedule ==
Date	Time	Opponent	Rank	Site	TV	Result	Attendance
September 1	7:00 p.m.	Monmouth		Wildcat Stadium; Durham, NH	FloSports	W 31–21	8,703
September 10	7:00 p.m.	at Albany		Bob Ford Field at Tom & Mary Casey Stadium; Albany, NY	FloSports	W 28–23	7,174
September 17	6:00 p.m.	North Carolina Central*	No. 25	Wildcat Stadium; Durham, NH	FloSports	L 27–45	9,630
September 24	6:00 p.m.	at Towson		Johnny Unitas Stadium; Towson, MD	FloSports	W 37–14	5,508
October 1	6:00 p.m.	at Western Michigan*		Waldo Stadium; Kalamazoo, MI	ESPN3	L 7–44	20,119
October 8	3:30 p.m.	Stony Brook^{†}		Wildcat Stadium; Durham, NH	FloSports	W 24–14	13,273
October 15	1:30 p.m.	at Dartmouth*		Memorial Field; Hanover, NH (Rivalry)	ESPN+	W 14–0	3,580
October 22	1:00 p.m.	No. 21 Elon	No. 25	Wildcat Stadium; Durham, NH	FloSports	W 40–22	14,137
November 5	3:30 p.m.	at No. 14 Richmond	No. 17	E. Claiborne Robins Stadium; Richmond, VA	FloSports	L 34–40	6,329
November 12	1:00 p.m.	No. 22 Rhode Island	No. 21	Wildcat Stadium; Durham, NH	FloSports	W 31–28	8,045
November 19	12:00 p.m.	at Maine	No. 18	Alfond Stadium; Orono, ME (Battle for the Brice–Cowell Musket)	FloSports	W 42–41 ^{OT}	4,638
November 26	2:00 p.m.	No. 16 Fordham*	No. 15	Wildcat Stadium; Durham, NH (NCAA Division I First Round)	ESPN+	W 52–42	2,989
December 3	12:00 p.m.	at No. 7 Holy Cross*	No. 15	Fitton Field; Worcester, MA (NCAA Division I Second Round)	ESPN+	L 19–35	6,265
*Non-conference game; ^{†}Homecoming; Rankings from STATS Poll released prior to the game; All times are in Eastern time

== Game summaries ==
=== Monmouth ===
	1	2	3	4	Total
Hawks	7	7	7	0	21
Wildcats	7	10	0	14	31

=== At Albany ===
	1	2	3	4	Total
Wildcats	7	7	7	7	28
Great Danes	0	3	7	13	23

=== North Carolina Central ===
	1	2	3	4	Total
Eagles	21	7	10	7	45
No. 25 Wildcats	7	14	0	6	27

=== At Towson ===
	1	2	3	4	Total
Wildcats	10	7	14	6	37
Tigers	0	0	14	0	14

=== At Western Michigan ===
	1	2	3	4	Total
Wildcats	0	7	0	0	7
Broncos	21	7	3	13	44

=== Stony Brook ===
	1	2	3	4	Total
Seawolves	0	7	0	7	14
Wildcats	0	10	7	7	24

=== At Dartmouth ===
	1	2	3	4	Total
Wildcats	7	7	0	0	14
Big Green	0	0	0	0	0

=== No. 21 Elon ===
	1	2	3	4	Total
No. 21 Phoenix	0	7	8	7	22
No. 25 Wildcats	7	16	7	10	40

=== At No. 14 Richmond ===
	1	2	3	4	Total
No. 17 Wildcats	0	7	20	7	34
No. 14 Spiders	7	17	13	3	40

=== No. 22 Rhode Island ===
	1	2	3	4	Total
No. 22 Rams	0	14	7	7	28
No. 21 Wildcats	0	10	11	10	31

=== At Maine ===
	1	2	3	4	OT	Total
No. 18 Wildcats	7	14	7	7	7	42
Black Bears	0	14	7	14	6	41

=== NCAA Division I First Round—No. 16 Fordham ===
	1	2	3	4	Total
No. 16 Rams	7	14	7	14	42
No. 15 Wildcats	21	7	14	10	52

=== NCAA Division I Second Round—at No. 7 Holy Cross ===
	1	2	3	4	Total
No. 15 Wildcats	2	3	6	8	19
No. 7 Crusaders	7	0	14	14	35
