= 2022 Rhode Island Rams football team =

American college football season

2022 Rhode Island Rams football
- Conference: Colonial Athletic Association
- Record: 7–4 (5–3 CAA)
- Head coach: Jim Fleming (9th season)
- Offensive coordinator: Patrick Murphy (3rd season)
- Defensive coordinator: Jack Cooper (3rd season)
- Home stadium: Meade Stadium

2022 Colonial Athletic Association football standings
	Conf.			Overall
Team	W		L	W		L
No. 8 William & Mary +^	7	–	1	11	–	2
No. 13 New Hampshire +^	7	–	1	9	–	4
No. 11 Richmond ^	6	–	2	9	–	4
No. 17 Elon ^	6	–	2	8	–	4
Rhode Island	5	–	3	7	–	4
No. 19 Delaware ^	4	–	4	8	–	5
Towson	4	–	4	6	–	5
Villanova	4	–	4	6	–	5
Monmouth	3	–	5	5	–	6
Albany	2	–	6	3	–	8
Maine	2	–	6	2	–	9
Hampton	1	–	7	4	–	7
Stony Brook	1	–	7	2	–	9
+ – Conference co-champions; ^ – FCS playoff participant; Rankings from STATS Poll

The 2022 Rhode Island Rams football team represented the University of Rhode Island as a member of the Colonial Athletic Association (CAA) during the 2022 NCAA Division I FCS football season. The Rams, led by ninth-year head coach Jim Fleming, played their home games at Meade Stadium.

== Schedule ==
Date	Time	Opponent	Rank	Site	TV	Result	Attendance
September 1	7:00 p.m.	at Stony Brook	No. 22	Kenneth P. LaValle Stadium; Stony Brook, NY	FloSports	W 35–14	7,101
September 10	6:00 p.m.	at Bryant*	No. 22	Beirne Stadium; Smithfield, RI	ESPN+	W 35–21	4,893
September 17	1:00 p.m.	No. 9 Delaware	No. 17	Meade Stadium; Kingston, RI	FloSports	L 21–42	4,666
September 24	12:00 p.m.	at No. 24 (FBS) Pittsburgh*	No. 20	Acrisure Stadium; Pittsburgh, PA	ACCN	L 24–45	54,667
October 1	6:00 p.m.	Brown*		Meade Stadium; Kingston, RI (rivalry)	FloSports	W 38–10	5,028
October 15	1:00 p.m.	No. 14 Elon	No. 25т	Meade Stadium; Kingston, RI	FloSports	W 17–10	5,415
October 22	1:00 p.m.	at Monmouth	No. 22	Kessler Stadium; West Long Branch, NJ	FloSports	W 48–46 ^{7OT}	3,478
October 29	1:00 p.m.	at No. 10 William & Mary	No. 18	Zable Stadium; Williamsburg, VA	FloSports	L 30–31	7,981
November 5	1:00 p.m.	Maine	No. 23	Meade Stadium; Kingston, RI	FloSports	W 26–22	4,377
November 12	1:00 p.m.	at No. 21 New Hampshire	No. 22	Wildcat Stadium; Durham, NH	FloSports	L 28–31	8,045
November 19	1:00 p.m.	Albany		Meade Stadium; Kingston, RI	FloSports	W 35–21	3,603
*Non-conference game; Rankings from STATS Poll released prior to the game; All times are in Eastern time

== Game summaries ==
=== At Stony Brook ===
Game One – No. 22 Rhode Island Rams (0–0) vs Stony Brook Seawolves (0–0)

Quarter	1	2	3	4	Total
No. 22 Rhode Island	7	7	7	14	35
Stony Brook	7	7	0	0	14

at Kenneth P. LaValle Stadium • Stony Brook, New York

- Date: Thursday, September 1, 2022
- Game time: 7:00 p.m. EST
- Game weather: Temperature: 79 °F (26 °C) • Weather: Sunny
- Game attendance: 7,101
- Referee: Henry Wimberg

Game information

First quarter

- (10:14) STBK – Carthell Flowers-LLoyd 20 Yd Fumble Return, Angelo Guglielmello Kick (Stony Brook 7–0)
- (2:48) URI – Paul Woods 7 Yd Pass, Michael DeBolt Kick (Tied 7–7)

Second quarter

- (10:50) URI – Jordan Jones 35 Yd Interception Return, Michael DeBolt Kick (Rhode Island 14–7)
- (0:50) STBK – Ty Son Lawton 2 Yd Run, Angelo Guglielmello Kick (Tied 14–14)

Third quarter

- (3:31) URI – Ed Lee 32 Yd Pass, Michael DeBolt Kick (Rhode Island 21–14)

Fourth quarter

- (12:24) URI – Kasim Hill 10 Yd Run, Michael DeBolt Kick (Rhode Island 28–14)
- (1:35) URI – Marques DeShields 2 Yd Run, Michael DeBolt Kick (Rhode Island 35–14)

Statistics	URI	STBK
First downs	21	15
Plays–yards	67–387	67–250
Rushes–yards	151	167
Passing yards	236	83
Passing: comp–att–int	17–32–0	8–24–3
Time of possession	29:12	30:48

Team	Category	Player	Statistics
Rhode Island	Passing	Kasim Hill	17/32, 236 yards, 2 TD
Rhode Island	Rushing	Jaylen Smith	13 carries, 81 yards
Rhode Island	Receiving	Ed Lee	6 receptions, 87 yards, 1 TD
Stony Brook	Passing	Joshua Zamot	6/16, 74 yards, 1 INT
Stony Brook	Rushing	Joshua Zamot	15 carry, 83 yards
Stony Brook	Receiving	Damien Caffrey	2 receptions, 20 yards

=== At Bryant ===
Game Two – No. 22 Rhode Island Rams (1–0) vs Bryant Bulldogs (0–1)

Quarter	1	2	3	4	Total
No. 22 Rhode Island	0	20	7	8	35
Bryant	7	7	0	7	21

at Beirne Stadium • Smithfield, Rhode Island

- Date: Saturday, September 10, 2022
- Game time: 6:00 p.m. EST
- Game weather: Temperature: 75 °F (24 °C) • Weather: Sunny
- Game attendance: 4,893
- Referee: Michael Jarosinski
- TV: ESPN+

Game information

First quarter

- (3:18) BRY – Derick Eugene 18 Yd Pass, Ethan Gettman Kick (Bryant 7–0)

Second quarter

- (14:57) URI – Jaylen Smith 1 Yd Run, Michael DeBolt PAT failed (Bryant 6–7)
- (12:54) URI – Ed Lee 78 Yd Pass, Harrison Leonard Kick (Rhode Island 13–7)
- (5:28) URI – Kahtero Summers 63 Yd Pass, Harrison Leonard Kick (Rhode Island 20–7)
- (0:40) BRY – Anthony White 7 Yd Pass, Ethan Gettman Kick (Rhode Island 20–14)

Third quarter

- (4:55) URI – Marques DeShields 16 Yd Run, Harrison Leonard Kick (Rhode Island 27–14)

Fourth quarter

- (8:55) URI – Jaylen Smith 50 Yd Run, Harrison Leonard PAT blocked (Rhode Island 33–14)
- (5:29) BRY – Matthew Prochasla 5 Yd Pass, Ethan Gettman Kick (Rhode Island 33–21)
- (2:06) URI – Team Safety (Rhode Island 35–21)

Statistics	URI	BRY
First downs	23	17
Plays–yards	61–502	66–264
Rushes–yards	212	-7
Passing yards	290	271
Passing: comp–att–int	14–20–1	22–37–0
Time of possession	32:09	27:51

Team	Category	Player	Statistics
Rhode Island	Passing	Kasim Hill	14/20, 290 yards, 2 TD, 1 INT
Rhode Island	Rushing	Marques DeShields	16 carries, 105 yards, 1 TD
Rhode Island	Receiving	Ed Lee	5 receptions, 135 yards, 1 TD
Bryant	Passing	Zevi Eckhaus	22/37, 271 yards, 3 TD
Bryant	Rushing	Ryan Clark	7 carry, 46 yards
Bryant	Receiving	David Zorrilla	4 receptions, 67 yards

=== No. 9 Delaware ===
Game Three – No. 17 Rhode Island Rams (2–0) vs No. 9 Delaware Fightin' Blue Hens (2–0)

Quarter	1	2	3	4	Total
No. 9 Delaware	7	28	0	7	42
No. 17 Rhode Island	0	7	7	7	21

at Meade Stadium • Kingston, Rhode Island

- Date: Saturday, September 17, 2022
- Game time: 1:00 p.m. EST
- Game weather: Temperature: 68 °F (20 °C) • Weather: Sunny
- Game attendance: 4,666
- Referee: Eric Lewis
- TV: FloSports

Game information

First quarter

- (6:34) DEL – Braden brose 21 Yd Pass, Garrett Bennion Kick (Delaware 7–0)

Second quarter

- (14:46) DEL – Jourdan Townsend 65 Yd Pass, Garrett Bennion Kick (Delaware 14–0)
- (6:17) DEL – Anthony Paoletti 9 Yd Run, Garrett Bennion Kick (Delaware 21–0)
- (1:58) DEL – Thyrick Pitts 8 Yd Pass, Garrett Bennion Kick (Delaware 28–0)
- (1:23) URI – Gabe Sloat 65 Yd Run, Harrison Leonard Kick (Delaware 28–7)
- (0:20) DEL – Jourdan Townsend 4 Yd Pass, Garrett Bennion Kick (Delaware 35–7)

Third quarter

- (9:21) URI – Kahtero Summers 19 Yd Pass, Harrison Leonard Kick (Delaware 35–14)

Fourth quarter

- (13:45) DEL – Kyron Cumby 9 Yd Run, Garrett Bennion Kick (Delaware 42–14)
- (1:23) URI – Kahtero Summers 20 Yd Pass, Harrison Leonard Kick (Delaware 42–21)

Statistics	DEL	URI
First downs	30	20
Plays–yards	81–610	60–299
Rushes–yards	231	120
Passing yards	379	179
Passing: comp–att–int	29–34–0	16–37–1
Time of possession	36:56	23:04

Team	Category	Player	Statistics
Delaware	Passing	Nolan Henderson	29/34, 379 yards, 4 TD
Delaware	Rushing	Kyron Cumby	8 carries, 77 yards, 1 TD
Delaware	Receiving	Jourdan Townsend	7 receptions, 109 yards, 2 TD
Rhode Island	Passing	Kasim Hill	16/37, 179 yards, 2 TD, 1 INT
Rhode Island	Rushing	Gabe Sloat	1 carry, 65 yards, 1 TD
Rhode Island	Receiving	Kahtero Summers	5 receptions, 78 yards, 2 TD

=== At No. 24 (FBS) Pittsburgh ===
Game Four – No. 20 Rhode Island Rams (2–1) vs No. 24 (FBS) Pittsburgh Panthers (2–1)

Quarter	1	2	3	4	Total
No. 20 Rhode Island	7	7	3	7	24
No. 24 (FBS) Pittsburgh	14	10	7	14	45

at Acrisure Stadium • Pittsburgh, Pennsylvania

- Date: Saturday, September 24, 2022
- Game time: 12:00 p.m. EST
- Game weather: Temperature: 64 °F (18 °C) • Wind: S at 5 miles per hour (8.0 km/h) • Weather: Sunny
- Game attendance: 54,667
- Referee: Stuart Mullins
- TV: ACCN

Game information

First quarter

- (12:18) PITT – M.J. Devonshire 82 Yd Punt Return, Ben Sauls Kick (Pittsburgh 7–0)
- (6:03) PITT – Israel Abanikanda 67 Yd Run, Ben Sauls Kick (Pittsburgh 14–0)
- (5:09) URI – Marques DeShields 63 Yd Run, Harrison Leonard Kick (Pittsburgh 14–7)

Second quarter

- (12:28) PITT – Israel Abanikanda 12 Yd Run, Ben Sauls Kick (Pittsburgh 21–7)
- (3:39) PITT – Ben Sauls 31 Yd Field Goal (Pittsburgh 24–7)
- (0:50) URI – Marques DeShields 1 Yd Run, Harrison Leonard Kick (Pittsburgh 24–14)

Third quarter

- (9:18) PITT – Israel Abanikanda 24 Yd Run, Ben Sauls Kick (Pittsburgh 31–14)
- (0:56) URI – Harrison Leonard 34 Yd Field Goal (Pittsburgh 31–17)

Fourth quarter

- (8:32) PITT – Israel Abanikanda 13 Yd Run, Ben Sauls Kick (Pittsburgh 38–17)
- (1:21) URI – Darius Savedge 15 Yd Pass, Harrison Leonard Kick (Pittsburgh 38–24)
- (1:11) PITT – Vincent Davis 18 Yd Run, Ben Sauls Kick (Pittsburgh 45–24)

Statistics	URI	PITT
First downs	16	25
Plays–yards	52	68–460
Rushes–yards	63	271
Passing yards	223	189
Passing: comp–att–int	17–30–0	20–27–0
Time of possession	24:51	35:09

Team	Category	Player	Statistics
Rhode Island	Passing	Kasim Hill	17/30, 223 yards, 1 TD
Rhode Island	Rushing	Marques DeShields	10 carries, 82 yards, 2 TD
Rhode Island	Receiving	Kahtero Summers	4 receptions, 55 yards
Pittsburgh	Passing	Kedon Slovis	20/27, 189 yards
Pittsburgh	Rushing	Israel Abanikanda	19 carries, 177 yards, 4 TD
Pittsburgh	Receiving	Konata Mumpfield	5 receptions, 42 yards

=== Brown ===
Game Five – No. 25 Rhode Island Rams (2–2) vs Brown Bears (1–1)

Quarter	1	2	3	4	Total
Brown	3	0	0	7	10
No. 25 Rhode Island	17	21	0	0	38

at Meade Stadium • Kingston, Rhode Island

- Date: Saturday, October 1, 2022
- Game time: 6:00 p.m. EST
- Game weather: Rain
- Game attendance: 5,028
- Referee: Christian Keel

Game information

First quarter

- (10:55) URI – Marques DeShields 21 Yd Run, Harrison Leonard Kick (Rhode Island 7–0)
- (8:13) URI – Jaylen Smith 6 Yd Run, Harrison Leonard Kick (Rhode Island 14–0)
- (5:41) BRWN – Christopher Maron 45 Yd Field Goal (Rhode Island 14–3)
- (2:45) URI – Harrison Leonard 36 Yd Field Goal (Rhode Island 17–3)

Second quarter

- (5:53) URI – Marques DeShields 12 Yd Run, Harrison Leonard Kick (Rhode Island 24–3)
- (0:43) URI – Caleb Warren 28 Yd Pass, Harrison Leonard Kick (Rhode Island 31–3)
- (0:24) URI – Caleb Warren 26 Yd Pass, Harrison Leonard Kick (Rhode Island 38–3)

Third quarter

no scoring

Fourth quarter

- (3:22) BRWN – Allen Smith 1 Yd Run, Christopher Maron Kick (Rhode Island 38–10)

Statistics	BRWN	URI
First downs	18	26
Plays–yards	71–261	64–546
Rushes–yards	103	289
Passing yards	158	257
Passing: comp–att–int	20–29–3	15–27–1
Time of possession	30:24	29:36

Team	Category	Player	Statistics
Brown	Passing	Jake Wilcox	20/29, 158 yards, 3 INT
Brown	Rushing	Allen Smith	20 carries, 41 yards, 1 TD
Brown	Receiving	Wes Rockett	4 receptions, 41 yards
Rhode Island	Passing	Kasim Hill	15/27, 257 yards, 2 TD, 1 INT
Rhode Island	Rushing	Marques DeShields	11 carries, 109 yards, 2 TD
Rhode Island	Receiving	Kahtero Summers	6 receptions, 112 yards

=== No. 14 Elon ===
Game Six – No. 25т Rhode Island Rams (3–2) vs No. 14 Elon Phoenix (5–1)

Quarter	1	2	3	4	Total
No. 14 Elon	3	7	0	0	10
No. 25т Rhode Island	0	3	7	7	17

at Meade Stadium • Kingston, Rhode Island

- Date: Saturday, October 15, 2022
- Game time: 1:00 p.m. EST
- Game weather: Sunny
- Game attendance: 5,415
- TV: FloSports

Game information

First quarter

- (4:29) ELON – Skyler Davis 33 Yd Field Goal (Elon 3–0)

Second quarter

- (12:44) URI – Harrison Leonard 21 Yd Field Goal (Tied 3–3)
- (6:13) ELON – Jalen Hampton 4 Yd Run, Skylar Davis Kick (Elon 10–3)

Third quarter

- (0:17) URI – Kasim Hill 7 Yd Run, Harrison Leonard Kick (Tied 10–10)

Fourth quarter

- (8:37) URI – Jarrett Martin 16 Yd Interception Return, Harrison Leonard Kick (Rhode Island 17–10)

Statistics	ELON	URI
First downs	17	17
Plays–yards	66–263	61–401
Rushes–yards	133	200
Passing yards	130	201
Passing: comp–att–int	14–28–1	17–29–0
Time of possession	31:50	28:10

Team	Category	Player	Statistics
Elon	Passing	Matthew McKay	14/28, 130 yards, 1 INT
Elon	Rushing	Jalen Hampton	20 carries, 81 yards, 1 TD
Elon	Receiving	Bryson Daughtry	5 receptions, 55 yards
Rhode Island	Passing	Kasim Hill	17/29, 201 yards
Rhode Island	Rushing	Marques DeShields	18 carries, 127 yards
Rhode Island	Receiving	Kahtero Summers	5 receptions, 74 yards

=== At Monmouth ===
Game Seven – No. 22 Rhode Island Rams (4–2) vs Monmouth Hawks (4–3)

Quarter	1	2	3	4	OT	2OT	3OT	4OT	5OT	6OT	7OT	Total
No. 22 Rhode Island	7	14	7	7	7	0	2	0	0	2	2	48
Monmouth	14	10	3	8	7	0	2	0	0	2	0	46

at Kessler Stadium • West Long Branch, New Jersey

- Date: Saturday, October 22, 2022
- Game time: 1:00 p.m. EST
- Game weather: Temperature: 64 °F (18 °C) • Weather: Sunny
- Game attendance: 3,478
- Referee: Jeff Pumphry
- TV: FloSports

Game information

First quarter

- (7:05) URI – Marques DeShields 5 Yd Pass, Harrison Leonard Kick (Rhode Island 7–0)
- (6:23) MON – Dymere Miller 13 Yd Pass, Eric Bernstein Kick (Tied 7–7)
- (1:58) MON – Ugo Obasi 28 Yd Pass, Eric Bernstein Kick (Monmouth 7–14)

Second quarter

- (13:42) URI – Ed Lee 10 Yd Pass, Harrison Leonard Kick (Tied 14–14)
- (9:03) MON – Jaden Shirden 13 Yd Run, Eric Bernstein Kick (Monmouth 14–21)
- (8:14) URI – Kasim Hill 1 Yd Run, Harrison Leonard Kick (Tied 21–21)
- (0:00) MON – Eric Bernstein 26 Yd Field Goal (Monmouth 21–24)

Third quarter

- (10:35) URI – Marques DeShields 3 Yd Run, Harrison Leonard Kick (Rhode Island 28–24)
- (6:23) MON – Eric Bernstein 29 Yd Field Goal (Rhode Island 28–27)

Fourth quarter

- (5:08) MON – Darrion Carrington 34 Yd Pass, Darrion Carrington 2PT Conversion (Monmouth 28–35)
- (3:23) URI – Marques DeShields 73 Yd Pass, Harrison Leonard Kick (Tied 35–35)

First Overtime

- MON – Owen Wright 1 Yd Run, Eric Bernstein Kick (Monmouth 35–42)
- URI – Marques DeShields 1 Yd Run, Harrison Leonard Kick (Tied 42–42)

Second Overtime

no scoring

Third Overtime

- MON – 2PT Conversion (Monmouth 42–44)
- URI – 2PT Conversion (Tied 44–44)

Fourth Overtime

no scoring

Fifth Overtime

no scoring

Sixth Overtime

- MON – 2PT Conversion (Monmouth 44–46)
- URI – 2PT Conversion (Tied 46–46)

Seventh Overtime

- URI – 2PT Conversion (Rhode Island 48–46)

Statistics	URI	MON
First downs	20	26
Plays–yards	71–530	80–486
Rushes–yards	178	237
Passing yards	352	249
Passing: comp–att–int	14–24–3	18–29–1
Time of possession	28:32	31:28

Team	Category	Player	Statistics
Rhode Island	Passing	Kasim Hill	14/24, 352 yards, 3 TD, 3 INT
Rhode Island	Rushing	Marques DeShields	28 carries, 161 yards, 2 TD
Rhode Island	Receiving	Ed Lee	4 receptions, 120 yards, 1 TD
Monmouth	Passing	Tony Muskett	18/29, 249 yards, 3 TD, 1 INT
Monmouth	Rushing	Jaden Shirden	23 carries, 141 yards, 1 TD
Monmouth	Receiving	Assanti Kearney	5 receptions, 105 yards

=== At No. 10 William & Mary ===
Game Eight – No. 18 Rhode Island Rams (5–2) vs No. 10 William & Mary Tribe (6–1)

Quarter	1	2	3	4	Total
No. 18 Rhode Island	7	7	7	9	30
No. 10 William & Mary	0	14	7	10	31

at Zable Stadium • Williamsburg, Virginia

- Date: Saturday, October 29, 2022
- Game time: 1:00 p.m. EST
- Game weather: Temperature: 62 °F (17 °C) • Weather: Cloudy
- Game attendance: 7,981
- Referee: Christian Keel
- TV: FloSports

Game information

First quarter

- (8:33) URI – Kasim Hill 1 Yd Run, Harrison Leonard Kick (Rhode Island 7–0)

Second quarter

- (14:55) URI – Kahtero Summers 8 Yd Pass, Harrison Leonard Kick (Rhode Island 14–0)
- (12:32) W&M – Bronson Yoder 7 Yd Run, Ethan Chang Kick (Rhode Island 14–7)
- (5:40) W&M – Donavyn Lester 14 Yd Run, Ethan Chang Kick (Tied 14–14)

Third quarter

- (11:27) W&M – Malachi Imoh 10 Yd Run, Ethan Chang Kick (William & Mary 14–21)
- (3:18) URI – Marques DeShields 1 Yd Run, Harrison Leonard Kick (Tied 21–21)

Fourth quarter

- (11:35) W&M – Ethan Chang 26 Yd Field Goal (William & Mary 21–24)
- (8:51) W&M – Donavyn Lester 5 Yd Run, Ethan Chang Kick (William & Mary 21–31)
- (6:51) URI – Harrison Leonard 28 Yd Field Goal (William & Mary 24–31)
- (0:00) URI – Caleb Warren 7 Yd Pass, Two-Point Run Conversion Failed (William & Mary 30–31)

Statistics	URI	W&M
First downs	25	22
Plays–yards	78–453	58–446
Rushes–yards	170	314
Passing yards	283	132
Passing: comp–att–int	24–47–1	9–13–1
Time of possession	29:53	30:03

Team	Category	Player	Statistics
Rhode Island	Passing	Kasim Hill	24/45, 283 yards, 2 TD, 1 INT
Rhode Island	Rushing	Marques DeShields	18 carries, 132 yards, 1 TD
Rhode Island	Receiving	Ed Lee	6 receptions, 86 yards
William & Mary	Passing	Darius Wilson	9/13, 132 yards, 1 INT
William & Mary	Rushing	Bronson Yoder	16 carries, 113 yards, 1 TD
William & Mary	Receiving	Malachi Imoh	3 receptions, 36 yards

=== Maine ===
Game Nine – No. 23 Rhode Island Rams (5–3) vs Maine Black Bears (2–6)

Quarter	1	2	3	4	Total
Maine	3	10	6	3	22
No. 23 Rhode Island	0	7	13	6	26

at Meade Stadium • Kingston, Rhode Island

- Date: Saturday, November 5, 2022
- Game time: 1:00 p.m. EST
- Game weather: Temperature: 70 °F (21 °C) • Weather: Cloudy
- Game attendance: 4,377
- Referee: Henry Wimberg
- TV: FloSports

Game information

First quarter

- (5:22) ME – Cody Williams 29 Yd Field Goal (Maine 3–0)

Second quarter

- (7:22) ME – Elijah Barnwell 2 Yd Run, Cody Williams Kick (Maine 10–0)
- (1:15) URI – Ed Lee 63 Yd Pass, Harrison Leonard Kick (Maine 10–7)
- (0:00) ME – Cody Williams 46 Yd Field Goal (Maine 13–7)

Third quarter

- (10:43) URI – Kasim Hill 7 Yd Run, Harrison Leonard Kick (Rhode Island 13–14)
- (2:20) ME – Rohan Jones 18 Yd Pass, Tavion Banks Run 2PT Conversion Failed (Maine 19–14)
- (1:06) URI – Kasim Hill 9 Yd Run, Kasim Hill Run 2PT Conversion Failed (Rhode Island 19–20)

Fourth quarter

- (9:33) ME – Cody Williams 39 Yd Field Goal (Maine 22–20)
- (7:17) URI – Marques DeShields 1 Yd Run, PAT Failed (Rhode Island 22–26)

Statistics	ME	URI
First downs	21	19
Plays–yards	70–309	58–393
Rushes–yards	183	149
Passing yards	126	244
Passing: comp–att–int	12–28–0	13–25–0
Time of possession	35:26	24:34

Team	Category	Player	Statistics
Maine	Passing	Joe Fagnano	12/27, 126 yards, 1 TD
Maine	Rushing	Elijah Barnwell	20 carries, 98 yards, 1 TD
Maine	Receiving	Kobay White	4 receptions, 37 yards
Rhode Island	Passing	Kasim Hill	13/25, 244 yards, 1 TD
Rhode Island	Rushing	Marques DeShields	23 carry, 110 yards, 1 TD
Rhode Island	Receiving	Ed Lee	8 receptions, 190 yards, 1 TD

=== At No. 21 New Hampshire ===
	1	2	3	4	Total
No. 22 Rams	0	14	7	7	28
No. 21 Wildcats	0	10	11	10	31

=== Albany ===
	1	2	3	4	Total
Great Danes	7	0	7	7	21
Rams	0	21	7	7	35

== Rankings ==
Ranking movements Legend: ██ Increase in ranking ██ Decrease in ranking — = Not ranked
	Week													
Poll	Pre	1	2	3	4	5	6	7	8	9	10	11	12	Final
STATS FCS	22	22	17	20	—	—	25	22	18	23	—	—	—	—
Coaches	24	20	14	21	25	23	22	19	17	22	—	—	—	—

== Personnel ==
=== Coaching staff ===
Name	Position
Jim Fleming	Head coach
Jack Cooper	Defensive coordinator/defensive back coach
Umberto Di Meo	Defensive line coach
Mike Flanagan	Associate head coach/Running backs coach/Recruiting coordinator
Troy Gilmer	Outside linebackers coach/special teams coordinator
Chris Lorenti	Inside linebackers coach
Clayton McGrath	Defensive quality control coach
Zach Metker	Offensive quality control coach
Patrick Murphy	Offensive coordinator/quarterbacks coach
Brendan Patterson	Tight ends coach
Custavious Patterson	Wide receivers coach
Chris Satoh	Director of player personnel and pro liaison/assistant defensive backs coach/director of video & social media
Stefon Wheeler	Offensive line coach/running game coordinator
Vince Sinagra	Chief of staff
Michaela Kraut	Director of operations
Donnie Smith	Director of player development
Robert Izzi	Team chaplain

=== Roster ===
2022 Rhode Island Rams Football
Quarterbacks: 7 – Kennique Bonner-Steward – (redshirt) sophomore (6'4, 230); 8 – Kasim Hill – (redshirt) senior (6'2, 234); 15 – Jackson Burkhalter – (redshirt) sophomore (6'4, 230); 19 – Trevor Nored – freshman (6'1, 220); Running backs: 5 – Jaylen Smith – sophomore (5'10, 205); 10 – Marques DeShields – (redshirt) senior (5'9, 200); 21 – Jaden Griffin – freshman (5'10, 170); 28 – Kamalie Pemberton – freshman (5'9, 180); 34 – Gabe Sloat – (redshirt) sophomore (6'0, 190); 41 – Rocco Cillino – (redshirt) freshman (5'9, 185); Wide receivers: 2 – Paul Woods – (redshirt) senior (6'1, 180); 3 – John Erby – (redshirt) sophomore (5'10, 185); 4 – Darius Savedge – (redshirt) junior (6'3, 215); 13 – Ed Lee – (redshirt) senior (5'10, 185); 14 – Marquis Buchanan – freshman (6'4, 185); 17 – Jamall Mensah – sophomore (5'11, 180); 18 – Kahtero Summers – (redshirt) Graduate (6'3, 213); 80 – DeJuan Ellis – (redshirt) junior (6'0, 177); 83 – J.T. Gibbons – senior (6'0, 225); 84 – Jig Williams – sophomore (6'3, 195); 85 – Mack Murtha – freshman (5'10, 180); 86 – Pedro Schmidt – (redshirt) Graduate (6'0, 195)	Tight ends: 42 – Sean Stackpole – freshman (6'4, 255); 81 – Tommy Smith – (redshirt) sophomore (6'2, 230); 82 – Caleb Warren – senior (6'3, 245); 87 – Hunter Hopperton – freshman (6'3, 250); 88 – Kevin Schaeffer – (redshirt) freshman (6'5, 245); 89 – Brady Roark – (redshirt) sophomore (6'2, 230); Offensive linemen: 60 – Nick Lombardo – freshman (6'2, 285); 61 – Daniel Ayriyan – senior (6'2, 290); 62 – Richard King – (redshirt) freshman (6'3, 305); 64 – Sebastian Delasoudas – (redshirt) junior (6'2, 305); 65 – Ajani Cornelius – sophomore (6'5, 310); 67 – Jordan Riendeau – (redshirt) sophomore (6'5, 285); 68 – Kai Rose – (redshirt) freshman (6'3, 330); 70 – Adam McKanna – (redshirt) freshman (6'5, 300); 72 – Jacob Otts – (redshirt) freshman (6'7, 300); 74 – Tre Alexander – freshman (6'2, 321); 75 – Nick Correia – (redshirt) junior (6'6, 330); 76 – Michael Scibelli – (redshirt) junior (6'3, 290); 77 – Asa Neal – freshman (6'4, 305); 78 – Lorenzo Thompson – (redshirt) junior (6'7, 295); 79 – Montaner Fresilli – (redshirt) sophomore (6'2, 285)	Defensive linemen: 44 – James Makszin – (redshirt) junior (6'3, 290); 50 – Matthew Osinaga – sophomore (6'2, 255); 51 – Adebayo Adeyemo – freshman (6'6, 275); 52 – Malachi Burby – (redshirt) sophomore (6'3, 265); 54 – Dylan Brown – (redshirt) junior (6'3, 340); 55 – Matt Thomas – junior (6'3, 271); 66 – Tosin Akinsulire – freshman (6'4, 277); 69 – Peter Papakyrikos – freshman (6'1, 290); 91 – Treyvon Christian – freshman (6'3, 295); 93 – Bless Nyanneh – freshman (6'3, 265); 97 – Jalen Brown – (redshirt) Graduate (6'0, 266); 98 – Jasyn Andrews – senior (6'3, 298); 99 – Westley Neal Jr. – sophomore (6'0, 200); Linebackers: 6 – Evan Stewart – (redshirt) sophomore (6'0, 225); 11 – Christian Arrington – (redshirt) junior (6'2, 230); 31 – Andre Johnson – (redshirt) junior (6'0, 210); 33 – Mekhi Bethel – sophomore (6'1, 220); 35 – Johnny Alvarado – (redshirt) sophomore (6'1, 260); 38 – Declan Williams – freshman (6'2, 230); 39 – Cole Brockwell – (redshirt) sophomore (6'0, 228); 45 – A.J. Pena – freshman (6'2, 235); 46 – Gabe Franco – freshman (6'1, 215); 47 – Jarrett Martin – (redshirt) junior (6'3, 220); 48 – Sean Pelkisson – (redshirt) sophomore (6'3. 240); 56 – Danilson DaVeiga – senior (6'2, 230); 57 – Michael Strachan – (redshirt) freshman (6'2, 230); 58 – Jake Fire – (redshirt) senior (5'11, 230); 59 – Paul Fuller – freshman (6'2, 205); 90 – Gabe Salomons – sophomore (6'4, 240)	Defensive backs: 8 – Antonio Carter II – (redshirt) sophomore (6'1, 200); 9 – Oneil "Buzz" Robinson – senior (6'2, 203); 16 – Jordan Colbert – (redshirt) Graduate (6'3, 215); 22 – Randy Jordan – (redshirt) sophomore (5'9, 175); 23 – Jordan Jones – (redshirt) senior (6'0, 180); 24 – Arthur White – sophomore (6'1, 196); 25 – Fredrick Mallay – sophomore (5'9, 175); 26 – Syeed Gibbs – freshman (6'0, 180); 27 – Emmanuel Gomes – (redshirt) sophomore (6'0, 200); 29 – Henry Yianakopolos – (redshirt) senior (6'1, 225); 30 – Andre DePina-Gray – freshman (6'1, 216); 32 – Malik Hill – sophomore (6'0, 180); 40 – Malik Gavek – (redshirt) senior (5'10, 195); 43 – Seun Filaoye – (redshirt) sophomore (5'10, 187); Placekickers: 36 – Harrison Leonard – (redshirt) sophomore (5'9,195); 46 – Dylan Shank – freshman (5'11, 205); 96 – Michael DeBolt – (redshirt) freshman (5'11, 206); Punters: 37 – Davey Schaum-Bartocci – (redshirt) senior (6'1, 187); 94 – Henry Westermann – (redshirt) sophomore (6'3, 225); Long snapper: 95 – Donato Crisanti – (redshirt) sophomore (6'5, 231)
Source and player details, 2022 Rhode Island Rams (10/16/2022):

== Statistics ==
=== Team ===
	Rhode Island	Opp
Scoring	170	142
Points per game	28.3	23.7
First downs	123	122
Rushing	49	
Passing	60	
Penalty	14	
Rushing yards	1035	898
Avg per play	5.5	
Avg per game	172.5	
Rushing touchdowns	12	
Passing yards	1386	1294
Att–Comp–Int	96–175–3	113–179–7
Avg per pass	7.9	7.2
Avg per catch	14.4	11.5
Avg per game	231	215.7
Passing touchdowns	9	7
Total offense	2421	2192
Avg per game	403.5	365.3
Fumbles–Lost	0–0	
Penalties–Yards	40–386	
Avg per game	64	

	Rhode Island	Opp
Punts–Yards	24–911	
Avg per punt	38.0	
Time of possession/Game	27:50	
3rd down conversions	40.30	
4th down conversions	37.50	
Touchdowns scored	22	
Field goals–Attempts	3–6	
PAT–Attempts		
Attendance		
Games/Avg per Game		
Neutral Site		

=== Individual leaders ===
==== Offense ====
Passing statistics
#	NAME	POS	RAT	CMP	ATT	YDS	AVG/G	CMP%	TD	INT	LONG
8	Kasim Hill	QB	134.9	96	175	1,386	231	54.9	9	3	78
	TOTALS		134.9	96	175	1,386	231	54.9%	9	3	78

Rushing statistics
#	NAME	POS	ATT	YDS	AVG	TD	LONG
10	Marques DeShields	RB	71	503	7.1	6	63
27	Jaylen Smith	RB	42	238	5.7	3	50
8	Kasim Hill	QB	56	165	2.9	2	38
34	Gabe Sloat	RB	9	107	11.9	1	65
21	Jaden Griffin	RB	6	34	5.7	0	8
41	Rocco Cillino	RB	2	3	1.5	0	3
7	Kennique Bonner-Steward	QB	1	0	0.0	0	0
13	Ed Lee	WR	1	0	0.0	0	0
37	Davey Schaum-Bartocci	P	1	-15	-15.0	0	-15
	TOTALS		187	1035	5.5	12	65

Receiving statistics
#	NAME	POS	CTH	YDS	AVG	TD	LONG
18	Kahtero Summers	WR	26	432	16.6	3	63
13	Ed Lee	WR	25	364	14.6	2	78
82	Caleb Warren	TE	15	258	17.2	2	29
4	Darius Savedge	WR	9	88	9.8	1	17
2	Paul Woods	WR	7	73	10.4	1	45
34	Gabe Sloat	RB	3	56	18.7	0	38
3	John Erby	WR	4	50	12.5	0	29
5	Jaylen Smith	RB	3	31	10.3	0	17
10	Marques DeShields	RB	2	20	10.0	0	12
89	Brady Roark	TE	2	14	7.0	0	9
	TOTALS		96	1,386	14.4	9	78

==== Defense ====
Defense statistics
#	NAME	POS	SOLO	AST	TOT	SACK	SACK-YDS	PD	INT	INT-YDS	LNG	TD	FF	FR	FTD
58	Jake Fire	LB	28	24	52	1.5	13	0	1	12	12	0	2	0	0
6	Evan Stewart	LB	20	15	35	2.5	23	2	1	0	0	0	0	1	0
8	Antonio Carter II	DB	24	9	33	0	0.0	6	1	7	7	0	1	1	0
9	O'Neil Robinson	DB	17	14	31	0	0.0	1	0	0	0	0	0	0	0
53	Gabe Salomons	LB	11	15	26	0	0.0	1	0	0	0	0	0	1	0
40	Malik Gavek	DB	15	11	26	0	0.0	0	0	0	0	0	0	0	0
16	Jordan Colbert	DB	16	6	22	0	0.0	0	0	0	0	0	1	0	0
29	Henry Yianakopolos	S	14	8	22	2.5	20	1	0	0	0	0	0	0	0
52	Malachi Burby	DL	9	11	20	1	3	0.0	0	0	0	0	1	0	0
23	Jordan Jones	DB	13	5	18	0	0.0	4	2	54	54	1	0	0	0
44	James Makszin	DL	5	13	18	0	0.0	0	0	0	0	0	0	0	0
45	A.J. Pena	LB	12	4	16	3.5	10	0.0	1	0	0	0	0	0	0
47	Jarrett Martin	LB	8	8	16	1.5	18	0.0	1	16	16	1	1	1	0
55	Matt Thomas	DL	5	10	15	1	1	0.0	0	0	0	0	0	0	0
99	Westley Neal Jr.	DL	4	6	10	0.5	1	0	0	0	0	0	0	0	0
54	Dylan Brown	DL	1	9	10	0	0.0	0	0	0	0	0	0	0	0
39	Cole Brockwell	LB	4	5	9	0	0.0	0	0	0	0	0	0	0	0
49	Emmanuel Gomes	DB	6	3	9	0	0.0	1	1	10	10	0	0	0	0
24	Arthur White	DB	3	4	7	0	0.0	2	0	0	0	0	0	0	0
25	Fredrick Mallay	DB	4	3	7	0	0.0	0	0	0	0	0	0	0	0
33	Mekhi Bethel	LB	4	2	6	0	0.0	0	0	0	0	0	0	0	0
11	Christian Arrington	LB	4	2	6	1	9	0	0	0	0	0	1	0	0
81	Tommy Smith	TE	3	2	5	0	0.0	0	0	0	0	0	0	0	0
20	A.J. Rogers	S	3	2	5	0	0.0	1	0	0	0	0	0	0	0
98	Jasyn Andrews	DL	4	0	4	0	0.0	0	0	0	0	0	0	0	0
26	Syeed Gibbs	DB	2	0	2	0	0.0	0	0	0	0	0	0	0	0
30	Randy Jordan	DB	2	0	2	0	0.0	0	0	0	0	0	0	0	0
31	Andre Johnson	LB	1	1	2	0	0.0	0	0	0	0	0	0	0	0
27	Jaylen Smith	RB	1	0	1	0	0.0	0	0	0	0	0	0	0	0
18	Kahtero Summers	WR	1	0	1	0	0.0	0	0	0	0	0	0	0	0
48	Sean Pelkisson	LB	1	0	1	0	0.0	0	0	0	0	0	0	0	0
	TOTAL		245	192	437	15.0	88	20	7	99	54	2	8	4	0

Key: POS: Position, SOLO: Solo Tackles, AST: Assisted Tackles, TOT: Total Tackles, SACK: Quarterback Sacks, SACK–YDS: Sack Yards, PD: Passes Defended, INT: Interceptions, INT–YDS: Interception Yards, LNG: Long Interception, TD: Interception Touchdowns, FR: Fumbles Recovered, FF: Forced Fumbles, FTD: Fumbles Touchdown

==== Special teams ====
Kicking statistics
#	NAME	POS	XPM	XPA	XP%	FGM	FGA	FG%	1–19	20–29	30–39	40–49	50+	LNG
36	Harrison Leonard	PK	16	17	94.1%	3	5	60%	0–0	1–1	2–4	0–0	0-0	36
96	Michael DeBolt	PK	5	6	83.3%	0	1	0%	0–0	0–0	0–1	0–0	0–0	0
	TOTALS		21	23	91.3%	3	6	50%	0-0	1-1	2-5	0-0	0-0	36

Punting statistics
#	NAME	POS	PUNTS	AVG	LONG	YDS
37	Davey Schaum-Bartocci	P	24	38.0	59	911
	TOTALS		24	38.0	59	911

=== Scoring ===
Rhode Island vs Non-Conference Opponents

	1	2	3	4	Total
Rhode Island	24	48	10	15	97
Opponents	24	17	7	28	76

Rhode Island vs CAA Opponents

	1	2	3	4	Total
Rhode Island	7	17	21	28	73
Opponents	10	42	0	7	59

Rhode Island vs All Opponents

	1	2	3	4	Total
Rhode Island	31	65	31	43	170
Opponents	41	59	7	35	142
