= 2022 Delaware Fightin' Blue Hens football team =

American college football season

2022 Delaware Fightin' Blue Hens football

NCAA Division I Second Round, L 6–42 at South Dakota State
- Conference: Colonial Athletic Association

Ranking
- STATS: No. 19
- FCS Coaches: No. 24 (tie)
- Record: 8–5 (4–4 CAA)
- Head coach: Ryan Carty (1st season)
- Offensive scheme: Spread option
- Defensive coordinator: Manny Rojas (3rd season)
- Base defense: 3–3–5
- Home stadium: Delaware Stadium

2022 Colonial Athletic Association football standings
| | Conf. | | | Overall |
| Team | W | | L | W | | L |
|---|---|---|---|---|---|---|
| No. 8 William & Mary +^ | 7 | – | 1 | 11 | – | 2 |
| No. 13 New Hampshire +^ | 7 | – | 1 | 9 | – | 4 |
| No. 11 Richmond ^ | 6 | – | 2 | 9 | – | 4 |
| No. 17 Elon ^ | 6 | – | 2 | 8 | – | 4 |
| Rhode Island | 5 | – | 3 | 7 | – | 4 |
| No. 19 Delaware ^ | 4 | – | 4 | 8 | – | 5 |
| Towson | 4 | – | 4 | 6 | – | 5 |
| Villanova | 4 | – | 4 | 6 | – | 5 |
| Monmouth | 3 | – | 5 | 5 | – | 6 |
| Albany | 2 | – | 6 | 3 | – | 8 |
| Maine | 2 | – | 6 | 2 | – | 9 |
| Hampton | 1 | – | 7 | 4 | – | 7 |
| Stony Brook | 1 | – | 7 | 2 | – | 9 |
+ – Conference co-champions; ^ – FCS playoff participant; Rankings from STATS Poll

The 2022 Delaware Fightin' Blue Hens football team represented the University of Delaware as a member of the Colonial Athletic Association (CAA) during the 2022 NCAA Division I FCS football season. They were led by first-year head coach Ryan Carty and played their home games at Delaware Stadium in Newark, Delaware.

== Preseason ==
=== CAA poll ===
In the CAA preseason poll released on July 28, 2022, the Blue Hens were predicted to finish in second place out of 13 teams following the departure of James Madison and the addition on Monmouth and Hampton for the 2022 season.

| Predicted finish | Team | Votes (1st place) |
|---|---|---|
| 1 | Villanova | 270 (16) |
| 2 | Delaware | 235 (7) |
| 3 | Rhode Island | 224 |
| 4 | Richmond | 219 |
| 5 | William & Mary | 206 (2) |
| 6 | Elon | 191 (1) |
| 7 | Stony Brook | 151 |
| 8 | Maine | 134 |
| 9 | New Hampshire | 117 |
| 10 | Monmouth | 105 |
| 11 | Towson | 81 |
| 12 | Albany | 64 |
| 13 | Hampton | 31 |

== Schedule ==
| Date | Time | Opponent | Rank | Site | TV | Result | Attendance |
|---|---|---|---|---|---|---|---|
| September 3 | 12:00 p.m. | at Navy* | No. 19 | Navy–Marine Corps Memorial Stadium; Annapolis, MD | CBSSN | W 14–7 | 30,542 |
| September 10 | 6:00 p.m. | Delaware State* | No. 10 | Delaware Stadium; Newark, DE (Route 1 Rivalry) | FloSports/NBC Sports Philadelphia | W 35–9 | 17,176 |
| September 17 | 1:00 p.m. | at No. 17 Rhode Island | No. 9 | Meade Stadium; Kingston, RI | FloSports | W 42–21 | 4,666 |
| September 24 | 6:00 p.m. | Hampton | No. 8 | Delaware Stadium; Newark, DE | FloSports | W 35–3 | 16,035 |
| October 1 | 3:30 p.m. | Towson | No. 6 | Delaware Stadium; Newark, DE | FloSports/NBC Sports Philadelphia | W 24–10 | 18,905 |
| October 8 | 3:30 p.m. | at No. 16 William & Mary | No. 6 | Zable Stadium; Williamsburg, VA (rivalry) | FloSports | L 21–27 | 12,506 |
| October 22 | 3:00 p.m. | Morgan State*^{†} | No. 13 | Delaware Stadium; Newark, DE | FloSports | W 38–7 | 16,375 |
| October 29 | 3:30 p.m. | at Elon | No. 12 | Rhodes Stadium; Elon, NC | FloSports | L 7–27 | 5,541 |
| November 5 | 1:00 p.m. | Monmouth | No. 18 | Delaware Stadium; Newark, DE | FloSports/NBC Sports Philadelphia | W 49–17 | 16,385 |
| November 12 | 1:00 p.m. | No. 12 Richmond | No. 17 | Delaware Stadium; Newark, DE | FloSports/NBC Sports Philadelphia | L 13–21 | 16,534 |
| November 19 | 1:00 p.m. | at Villanova | No. 20 | Villanova Stadium; Villanova, PA (Battle of the Blue) | FloSports | L 26–29 | 6,451 |
| November 26 | 2:00 p.m. | Saint Francis (PA)* | No. 23 | Delaware Stadium; Newark, DE (NCAA Division I First Round) | ESPN+ | W 56–17 | 4,629 |
| December 3 | 3:00 p.m. | at No. 1 South Dakota State* | No. 23 | Dana J. Dykhouse Stadium; Brookings, SD (NCAA Division I Second Round) | ESPN+ | L 6–42 | 6,117 |
*Non-conference game; ^{†}Homecoming; Rankings from STATS Poll released prior to the game; All times are in Eastern time

== Game summaries ==
=== At Navy ===
Delaware at Navy

| Team | 1 | 2 | 3 | 4 | Total |
|---|---|---|---|---|---|
| • No. 19 Fightin' Blue Hens | 7 | 0 | 7 | 0 | 14 |
| Midshipmen | 0 | 0 | 7 | 0 | 7 |

- Date: September 3, 2022
- Location: Navy–Marine Corps Memorial Stadium
  Annapolis, MD
- Game start: 12:03 p.m.
- Elapsed time: 3 hours, 21 minutes
- Game attendance: 30,542
- Game weather: 82 °F (28 °C) • Weather: Sunny • Wind: SE 6 MPH
- Referee: Kevin Randall
- TV announcers (CBSSN): Chick Hernandez (play-by-play), Randy Cross (analyst) & Sheehan Stanwick Burch (sideline)

Scoring summary
1 | 14:38 | DEL | Bryce De Mille 6–yard pass from Nolan Henderson (Brandon Radcliffe kick) (1 play, 21 yards, 0:10) | DEL 7–0
2 | No scoring plays this quarter
3 | 4:30 | DEL | Chandler Harvin 51–yard pass from Noah Henderson (Brandon Radcliffe kick) (5 plays, 78 yards, 3:12) | DEL 14–0
0:29 | NAVY | Tai Lavatai 2–yard run (Evan Warren kick) (10 plays, 56 yards, 3:55) | DEL 14–7
4 | No scoring plays this quarter

| Statistics | Delaware | Navy |
|---|---|---|
| First downs | 13 | 17 |
| Plays–yards | 61 | 76 |
| Rushes–yards | 3 | 184 |
| Passing yards | 189 | 135 |
| Passing: comp–att–int | 20–32–0 | 5–13–0 |
| Time of possession | 27:41 | 32:19 |

| Team | Category | Player | Statistics |
|---|---|---|---|
| Delaware | Passing | Nolan Henderson | 20–32–0, 189 yards, 2 TD |
| Delaware | Rushing | Quincy Watson | 6 carries, 15 yards |
| Delaware | Receiving | Chandler Harvin | 3 receptions, 69 yards, TD |
| Navy | Passing | Tai Lavatai | 5–13–0, 135 yards, TD |
| Navy | Rushing | Daba Fofana | 15 carries, 48 yards |
| Navy | Receiving | Maquel Haywood | 2 receptions, 77 yards |

=== Delaware State ===
| | 1 | 2 | 3 | 4 | Total |
|---|---|---|---|---|---|
| Hornets | 3 | 0 | 0 | 6 | 9 |
| No. 10 Fightin' Blue Hens | 7 | 7 | 14 | 7 | 35 |

=== At No. 17 Rhode Island ===
| | 1 | 2 | 3 | 4 | Total |
|---|---|---|---|---|---|
| No. 9 Fightin' Blue Hens | 7 | 28 | 0 | 7 | 42 |
| No. 17 Rams | 0 | 7 | 7 | 7 | 21 |

=== Hampton ===
| | 1 | 2 | 3 | 4 | Total |
|---|---|---|---|---|---|
| Pirates | 0 | 0 | 0 | 3 | 3 |
| No. 8 Fightin' Blue Hens | 14 | 0 | 14 | 7 | 35 |

=== Towson ===
| | 1 | 2 | 3 | 4 | Total |
|---|---|---|---|---|---|
| Tigers | 0 | 3 | 0 | 7 | 10 |
| No. 6 Fightin' Blue Hens | 0 | 14 | 7 | 3 | 24 |

=== At No. 16 William & Mary ===
| | 1 | 2 | 3 | 4 | Total |
|---|---|---|---|---|---|
| No. 6 Fightin' Blue Hens | 0 | 7 | 14 | 0 | 21 |
| No. 16 Tribe | 0 | 17 | 7 | 3 | 27 |

=== Morgan State ===
| | 1 | 2 | 3 | 4 | Total |
|---|---|---|---|---|---|
| Bears | 0 | 7 | 0 | 0 | 7 |
| No. 13 Fightin' Blue Hens | 14 | 0 | 7 | 17 | 38 |

=== At Elon ===
| | 1 | 2 | 3 | 4 | Total |
|---|---|---|---|---|---|
| No. 12 Fightin' Blue Hens | 7 | 0 | 0 | 0 | 7 |
| Phoenix | 3 | 7 | 14 | 3 | 27 |

=== Monmouth ===
| | 1 | 2 | 3 | 4 | Total |
|---|---|---|---|---|---|
| Hawks | 10 | 0 | 0 | 7 | 17 |
| No. 18 Fightin' Blue Hens | 21 | 21 | 7 | 0 | 49 |

=== No. 12 Richmond ===
| | 1 | 2 | 3 | 4 | Total |
|---|---|---|---|---|---|
| No. 12 Spiders | 3 | 3 | 3 | 12 | 21 |
| No. 17 Fightin' Blue Hens | 0 | 0 | 0 | 13 | 13 |

=== At Villanova ===
| | 1 | 2 | 3 | 4 | Total |
|---|---|---|---|---|---|
| No. 20 Fightin' Blue Hens | 7 | 9 | 7 | 3 | 26 |
| Wildcats | 7 | 7 | 7 | 8 | 29 |

== FCS Playoffs ==
=== Saint Francis – first round ===
| | 1 | 2 | 3 | 4 | Total |
|---|---|---|---|---|---|
| Red Flash | 3 | 0 | 7 | 7 | 17 |
| No. 23 Fightin' Blue Hens | 14 | 14 | 7 | 21 | 56 |

=== South Dakota State – second round ===
| | 1 | 2 | 3 | 4 | Total |
|---|---|---|---|---|---|
| No. 23 Fightin' Blue Hens | 3 | 3 | 0 | 0 | 6 |
| No. 1 Jackrabbits | 7 | 14 | 21 | 0 | 42 |
