= 2022 Albany Great Danes football team =

American college football season

2022 Albany Great Danes football
- Conference: Colonial Athletic Association
- Record: 3–8 (2–6 CAA)
- Head coach: Greg Gattuso (9th season)
- Co-offensive coordinators: Nate Byham (1st season); Jared Ambrose (1st season)
- Defensive coordinator: Joe Bernard (5th season)
- Home stadium: Bob Ford Field at Tom & Mary Casey Stadium

2022 Colonial Athletic Association football standings
	Conf.			Overall
Team	W		L	W		L
No. 8 William & Mary +^	7	–	1	11	–	2
No. 13 New Hampshire +^	7	–	1	9	–	4
No. 11 Richmond ^	6	–	2	9	–	4
No. 17 Elon ^	6	–	2	8	–	4
Rhode Island	5	–	3	7	–	4
No. 19 Delaware ^	4	–	4	8	–	5
Towson	4	–	4	6	–	5
Villanova	4	–	4	6	–	5
Monmouth	3	–	5	5	–	6
Albany	2	–	6	3	–	8
Maine	2	–	6	2	–	9
Hampton	1	–	7	4	–	7
Stony Brook	1	–	7	2	–	9
+ – Conference co-champions; ^ – FCS playoff participant; Rankings from STATS Poll

The 2022 Albany Great Danes football team represented the University at Albany, SUNY as a member of the Colonial Athletic Association (CAA) during the 2022 NCAA Division I FCS football season. Led by ninth-year head coach Greg Gattuso, the Great Danes compiled an overall record of 3–8 with a mark of 2–6 in conference play, tying for tenth place in the CAA. The team played home games at Bob Ford Field at Tom & Mary Casey Stadium in Albany, New York.

== Schedule ==
Date	Time	Opponent	Site	TV	Result	Attendance
September 3	7:00 p.m.	at No. 10 (FBS) Baylor*	McLane Stadium; Waco, TX	ESPN+	L 10–69	41,242
September 10	7:00 p.m.	New Hampshire	Bob Ford Field at Tom & Mary Casey Stadium; Albany, NY	FloSports	L 23–28	7,174
September 17	1:00 p.m.	at Fordham*	Coffey Field; Bronx, NY	SNY, ESPN+	L 45–48	5,000
September 24	3:30 p.m.	Central Connecticut*	Bob Ford Field at Tom & Mary Casey Stadium; Albany, NY	FloSports	W 45–26	6,111
October 8	1:00 p.m.	at Monmouth	Kessler Stadium; West Long Branch, NJ	FloSports	L 31–38	2,532
October 15	3:30 p.m.	Hampton	Bob Ford Field at Tom & Mary Casey Stadium; Albany, NY	FloSports	L 37–38 ^{OT}	8,212
October 22	3:30 p.m.	at Villanova	Villanova Stadium; Villanova, PA	FloSports	L 29–31	6,741
October 29	1:00 p.m.	Stony Brook	Bob Ford Field at Tom & Mary Casey Stadium; Albany, NY (rivalry)	FloSports	W 59–14	2,403
November 5	2:00 p.m.	at No. 19 Elon	Rhodes Stadium; Elon, NC	FloSports	L 3–27	8,368
November 12	12:00 p.m.	Maine	Bob Ford Field at Tom & Mary Casey Stadium; Albany, NY	FloSports	W 23–21	2,301
November 19	1:00 p.m.	at Rhode Island	Rhodes Stadium; Kingston, RI	FloSports	L 21–35	3,603
*Non-conference game; Rankings from STATS Poll released prior to the game; All times are in Eastern time

== Game summaries ==
=== At No. 10 (FBS) Baylor ===
Albany Great Danes (0–0) vs. No. 10 (FBS) Baylor Bears (0–0)

Quarter	1	2	3	4	Total
Great Danes	7	0	3	0	10
No. 10 (FBS) Bears	21	14	14	20	69

at McLane Stadium • Waco, TX

- Date: Saturday, September 3, 2022
- Game time: 7:00 p.m. EDT
- Game weather: sunny • Temperature: 86°F
- Game attendance: 41,242
- Referee: Kevin Boitmann
- TV announcers (ESPN+): Pete Sousa (play-by-play), Chad Brown (analyst), and Shane Sparks (sideline)

Game information

First Quarter

- (10:59) BU – Monaray Baldwin 47 yard pass from Blake Shapen, Isaiah Hankins kick (Drive: 6 plays, 76 yards, 2:20; BU 7–0)
- (8:03) BU – Craig Williams 4 yard rush, Isaiah Hankins kick (Drive: 4 plays, 29 yards, 1:46; BU 14–0)
- (5:37) BU – Gavin Holmes 72 yard punt return, Isaiah Hankins kick (BU 21–0)
- (0:00) ALB – Julian Hicks 17 yard pass from Reese Poffenbarger, John Opalko kick (Drive: 4 plays, 30 yards, 2:14; BU 21–7)

Second Quarter

- (11:55) BU – Hal Presley 38 yard pass from Blake Shapen, Isaiah Hankins kick (Drive: 6 plays, 75 yards, 3:05; BU 28–7)
- (0:00) BU – Blake Shapen 1 yard rush, Isaiah Hankins kick (Drive: 11 plays, 80 yards, 2:44; BU 35–7)

Third Quarter

- (11:48) BU – Monaray Baldwin 50 yard rush, Isaiah Hankins kick (Drive: 6 plays, 80 yards, 3:12; BU 42–7)
- (6:19) ALB – John Opalko 25 yard field goal (Drive: 11 plays, 67 yards, 5:29; BU 42–10)
- (1:54) BU – Kyron Drones 9 yard rush, John Mayers kick (Drive: 9 plays, 54 yards, 4:25; BU 49–10)

Fourth Quarter

- (12:33) BU – Richard Reese 1 yard rush, John Mayers kick (Drive: 7 plays, 61 yards, 2:40; BU 56–10)
- (9:10) BU – Richard Reese 7 yard rush, John Mayers kick (Drive: 4 plays, 22 yards, 1:59; BU 63–10)
- (5:46) BU – Qualan Jones 27 yard rush, John Mayers kick missed (Drive: 4 plays, 66 yards, 1:45; BU 69–10)

Statistics	ALB	BU
First downs	10	29
Total yards	237	573
Rushes/yards	30/87	41/259
Passing yards	150	314
Passing: Comp–Att–Int	13–30–0	22–27–0
Time of possession	30:28	29:32

Team	Category	Player	Statistics
Albany	Passing	Reese Poffenbarger	13–26, 150 yards, 1 TD
Albany	Rushing	Reese Poffenbarger	12 carries, 45 yards
Albany	Receiving	Thomas Greaney	3 receptions, 57 yards
Baylor	Passing	Blake Shapen	17–20, 214 yards, 2 TD
Baylor	Rushing	Richard Reese	9 carries, 62 yards, 2 TD
Baylor	Receiving	Monaray Baldwin	4 receptions, 84 yards, 1 TD

=== New Hampshire ===
	1	2	3	4	Total
Wildcats	7	7	7	7	28
Great Danes	0	3	7	13	23

=== At Fordham ===
	1	2	3	4	Total
Great Danes	0	24	14	7	45
Rams	10	7	10	21	48

=== Central Connecticut ===
	1	2	3	4	Total
Blue Devils	6	6	8	6	26
Great Danes	14	10	21	0	45

=== At Monmouth ===
	1	2	3	4	Total
Great Danes	7	3	7	14	31
Hawks	14	10	7	7	38

=== Hampton ===
	1	2	3	4	OT	Total
Pirates	7	3	7	14	7	38
Great Danes	7	17	0	7	6	37

=== At Villanova ===
	1	2	3	4	Total
Great Danes	0	7	9	13	29
Wildcats	7	14	0	10	31

=== Stony Brook ===
	1	2	3	4	Total
Seawolves	0	0	0	14	14
Great Danes	21	17	21	0	59

=== At No. 19 Elon ===
	1	2	3	4	Total
Great Danes	3	0	0	0	3
No. 19 Phoenix	7	17	0	3	27

=== Maine ===
	1	2	3	4	Total
Black Bears	7	0	7	7	21
Great Danes	0	10	7	6	23

=== At Rhode Island ===
	1	2	3	4	Total
Great Danes	7	0	7	7	21
Rams	0	21	7	7	35
