= 2022 Hampton Pirates football team =

American college football season

2022 Hampton Pirates football
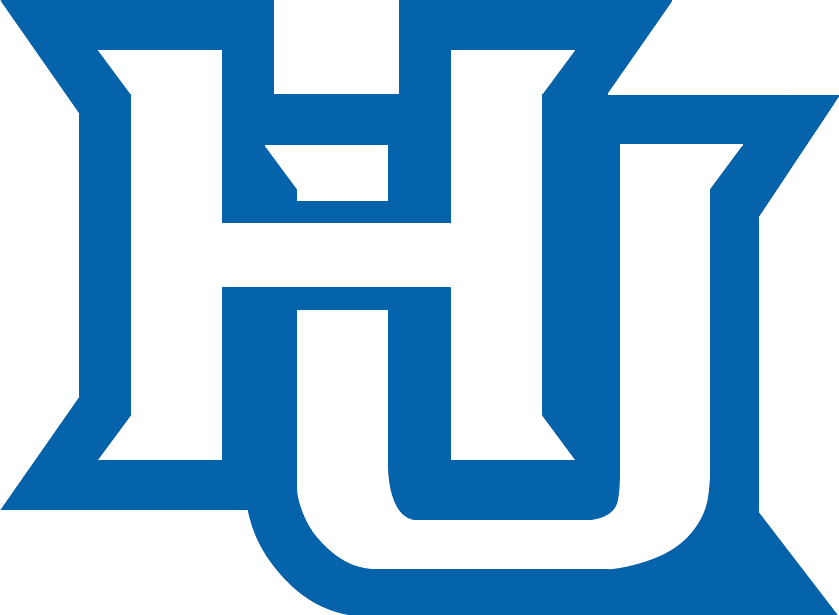
- Conference: Colonial Athletic Association
- Record: 4–7 (1–7 CAA)
- Head coach: Robert Prunty (4th season)
- Offensive coordinator: Zack Patterson (3rd season)
- Co-defensive coordinators: Chris Cosh (1st season); Todd McComb (3rd season)
- Home stadium: Armstrong Stadium

2022 Colonial Athletic Association football standings
	Conf.			Overall
Team	W		L	W		L
No. 8 William & Mary +^	7	–	1	11	–	2
No. 13 New Hampshire +^	7	–	1	9	–	4
No. 11 Richmond ^	6	–	2	9	–	4
No. 17 Elon ^	6	–	2	8	–	4
Rhode Island	5	–	3	7	–	4
No. 19 Delaware ^	4	–	4	8	–	5
Towson	4	–	4	6	–	5
Villanova	4	–	4	6	–	5
Monmouth	3	–	5	5	–	6
Albany	2	–	6	3	–	8
Maine	2	–	6	2	–	9
Hampton	1	–	7	4	–	7
Stony Brook	1	–	7	2	–	9
+ – Conference co-champions; ^ – FCS playoff participant; Rankings from STATS Poll

The 2022 Hampton Pirates football team represented the Hampton University as a first year member of the Colonial Athletic Association during the 2022 NCAA Division I FCS football season. Led by third-year head coach Robert Prunty, the Pirates played their home games at the Armstrong Stadium in Hampton, Virginia.

== Schedule ==
Date	Time	Opponent	Site	TV	Result	Attendance
September 3	6:00 p.m.	Howard*	Armstrong Stadium; Hampton, VA (The Real HU)	Flo Football	W 31–28	2,587
September 10	6:00 p.m.	Tuskegee*	Armstrong Stadium; Hampton, VA	Flo Football	W 42–10	6,512
September 17	2:00 p.m.	at Norfolk State*	William "Dick" Price Stadium; Norfolk, VA (Battle of the Bay)	ESPN+	W 17–7	15,459
September 24	6:00 p.m.	at No. 8 Delaware	Delaware Stadium; Newark, DE	Flo Football	L 3–35	16,035
October 8	2:00 p.m.	Maine	Armstrong Stadium; Hampton, VA	Flo Football	L 24–31	4,512
October 15	3:30 p.m.	at Albany	Bob Ford Field at Tom & Mary Casey Stadium; Albany, NY	Flo Football	W 38–37 ^{OT}	8,212
October 22	2:00 p.m.	No. 19 Richmond^{†}	Armstrong Stadium; Hampton, VA	Flo Football	L 10–41	
October 29	1:00 p.m.	at Villanova	Villanova Stadium; Villanova, PA	Flo Football	L 10–24	4,097
November 5	1:00 p.m.	No. 8 William & Mary	Armstrong Stadium; Hampton, VA	Flo Football	L 14–20	4,126
November 12	1:00 p.m.	No. 18 Elon	Armstrong Stadium; Hampton, VA	Flo Football	L 24–38	
November 19	1:00 p.m.	at Towson	Johnny Unitas Stadium; Towson, MD	Flo Football	L 7–27	
*Non-conference game; ^{†}Homecoming; Rankings from STATS Poll released prior to the game; All times are in Eastern time

== Game summaries ==
=== Howard ===
	1	2	3	4	Total
Bison	0	6	0	22	28
Pirates	0	14	7	10	31

=== Tuskegee ===
	1	2	3	4	Total
Golden Tigers	0	7	3	0	10
Pirates	14	7	7	14	42

=== At Norfolk State ===
	1	2	3	4	Total
Pirates	7	0	7	3	17
Spartans	7	0	0	0	7

=== At No. 8 Delaware ===
	1	2	3	4	Total
Pirates	0	0	0	3	3
No. 8 Fightin' Blue Hens	14	0	14	7	35

=== Maine ===
	1	2	3	4	Total
Black Bears	7	10	0	14	31
Pirates	14	0	10	0	24

=== At Albany ===
	1	2	3	4	OT	Total
Pirates	7	3	7	14	7	38
Great Danes	7	17	0	7	6	37

=== No. 19 Richmond ===
	1	2	3	4	Total
No. 19 Spiders	10	14	7	10	41
Pirates	0	10	0	0	10

=== At Villanova ===
	1	2	3	4	Total
Pirates	0	3	7	0	10
Wildcats	7	3	7	7	24

=== No. 8 William & Mary ===
	1	2	3	4	Total
No. 8 Tribe	7	3	7	3	20
Pirates	0	7	7	0	14

=== No. 18 Elon ===
	1	2	3	4	Total
No. 18 Phoenix	14	7	10	7	38
Pirates	7	10	0	7	24

=== At Towson ===
	1	2	3	4	Total
Pirates	0	7	0	0	7
Tigers	7	10	3	7	27
