= 2022 Elon Phoenix football team =

American college football season

2022 Elon Phoenix football

NCAA Division I First Round, L 6–31 at Furman
- Conference: Colonial Athletic Association

Ranking
- STATS: No. 17
- FCS Coaches: No. 18
- Record: 8–4 (6–2 CAA)
- Head coach: Tony Trisciani (4th season)
- Offensive coordinator: Drew Folmar (6th season)
- Defensive coordinator: Dovonte Edwards (1st season)
- Home stadium: Rhodes Stadium

2022 Colonial Athletic Association football standings
	Conf.			Overall
Team	W		L	W		L
No. 8 William & Mary +^	7	–	1	11	–	2
No. 13 New Hampshire +^	7	–	1	9	–	4
No. 11 Richmond ^	6	–	2	9	–	4
No. 17 Elon ^	6	–	2	8	–	4
Rhode Island	5	–	3	7	–	4
No. 19 Delaware ^	4	–	4	8	–	5
Towson	4	–	4	6	–	5
Villanova	4	–	4	6	–	5
Monmouth	3	–	5	5	–	6
Albany	2	–	6	3	–	8
Maine	2	–	6	2	–	9
Hampton	1	–	7	4	–	7
Stony Brook	1	–	7	2	–	9
+ – Conference co-champions; ^ – FCS playoff participant; Rankings from STATS Poll

The 2022 Elon Phoenix football team represented Elon University as a member of the Colonial Athletic Association (CAA) during the 2022 NCAA Division I FCS football season. The Phoenix, led by fourth-year head coach Tony Trisciani, played their home games at Rhodes Stadium.

== Schedule ==
Date	Time	Opponent	Rank	Site	TV	Result	Attendance
September 3	7:00 p.m.	at Vanderbilt*		FirstBank Stadium; Nashville, TN	SECN+/ESPN+	L 31–42	20,120
September 10	6:00 p.m.	at Wofford*		Gibbs Stadium; Spartanburg, SC	ESPN+	W 26–0	2,549
September 17	6:00 p.m.	Gardner–Webb*		Rhodes Stadium; Elon, NC	FloSports	W 30–24	8,126
September 24	3:30 p.m.	at No. 14 William & Mary		Zable Stadium; Williamsburg, VA	FloSports	W 35–31	10,803
October 1	2:00 p.m.	No. 17 Richmond	No. 23	Rhodes Stadium; Elon, NC	FloSports	W 30–27 ^{2OT}	9,243
October 8	2:00 p.m.	Towson	No. 14	Rhodes Stadium; Elon, NC	FloSports	W 27–10	5,578
October 15	1:00 p.m.	at No. T–25 Rhode Island	No. 14	Meade Stadium; Kingston, RI	FloSports	L 10–17	5,415
October 22	1:00 p.m.	at No. 25 New Hampshire	No. 21	Wildcat Stadium; Durham, NH	FloSports	L 22–40	14,137
October 29	3:30 p.m.	No. 12 Delaware		Rhodes Stadium; Elon, NC	FloSports	W 27–7	5,541
November 5	2:00 p.m.	Albany^{†}	No. 19	Rhodes Stadium; Elon, NC	FloSports	W 27–3	8,368
November 12	1:00 p.m.	at Hampton	No. 18	Armstrong Stadium; Hampton, VA	FloSports	W 38–24	
November 26	12:00 p.m.	at No. 11 Furman*	No. 12	Paladin Stadium; Greenville, SC (NCAA Division I First Round)	ESPN+	L 6–31	2,717
*Non-conference game; ^{†}Homecoming; Rankings from STATS Poll released prior to the game; All times are in Eastern time

== Game summaries ==
=== At Vanderbilt ===
	1	2	3	4	Total
Phoenix	7	3	14	7	31
Commodores	21	7	7	7	42

Statistics

Statistics	ELON	VAN
First downs	23	17
Total yards	495	424
Rushing yards	152	179
Passing yards	343	245
Turnovers	1	0
Time of possession	34:29	25:27

Team	Category	Player	Statistics
Elon	Passing	Matthew McKay	19/32, 333 yards, 2 TD
Elon	Rushing	Matthew McKay	13 rushes, 52 yards, 2 TD
Elon	Receiving	Jackson Parham	8 receptions, 143 yards, TD
Vanderbilt	Passing	Mike Wright	18/29, 245 yards, 4 TD
Vanderbilt	Rushing	Ray Davis	20 rushes, 95 yards
Vanderbilt	Receiving	Jayden McGowan	4 receptions, 118 yards, TD

=== At Wofford ===
	1	2	3	4	Total
Phoenix	3	9	7	7	26
Terriers	0	0	0	0	0

=== Gardner–Webb ===
	1	2	3	4	Total
Runnin' Bulldogs	3	21	0	0	24
Phoenix	13	7	7	3	30

=== At No. 14 William & Mary ===
	1	2	3	4	Total
Phoenix	7	3	6	19	35
No. 14 Tribe	14	14	3	0	31

=== No. 17 Richmond ===
	1	2	3	4	OT	2OT	Total
No. 17 Spiders	7	7	3	0	7	3	27
No. 23 Phoenix	14	0	0	3	7	6	30

=== Towson ===
	1	2	3	4	Total
Tigers	7	0	0	3	10
No. 14 Phoenix	0	14	3	10	27

=== At No. 25т Rhode Island ===
	1	2	3	4	Total
No. 14 Phoenix	3	7	0	0	10
No. 25т Rams	0	3	7	7	17

=== At No. 25 New Hampshire ===
	1	2	3	4	Total
No. 21 Phoenix	0	7	8	7	22
No. 25 Wildcats	7	16	7	10	40

=== No. 12 Delaware ===
	1	2	3	4	Total
No. 12 Fightin' Blue Hens	7	0	0	0	7
Phoenix	3	7	14	3	27

=== Albany ===
	1	2	3	4	Total
Great Danes	3	0	0	0	3
No. 19 Phoenix	7	17	0	3	27

=== At Hampton ===
	1	2	3	4	Total
No. 18 Phoenix	14	7	10	7	38
Pirates	7	10	0	7	24

== FCS Playoffs ==
=== At Furman – first round ===
	1	2	3	4	Total
No. 12 Phoenix	3	0	0	3	6
No. 11 Paladins	7	7	3	14	31
