= 2022 VMI Keydets football team =

American college football season

2022 VMI Keydets football
- Conference: Southern Conference
- Record: 1–10 (0–8 SoCon)
- Head coach: Scott Wachenheim (8th season)
- Offensive coordinator: Patrick Ashford (1st season)
- Defensive coordinator: Nick Reveiz (1st season)
- Home stadium: Alumni Memorial Field

2022 Southern Conference football standings
	Conf.			Overall
Team	W		L	W		L
No. 7 Samford $^	8	–	0	11	–	2
No. 10 Furman ^	7	–	1	10	–	3
No. 23 Chattanooga	5	–	3	7	–	4
No. 24 Mercer	5	–	3	7	–	4
Western Carolina	4	–	4	6	–	5
Wofford	3	–	5	3	–	8
The Citadel	3	–	5	4	–	7
East Tennessee State	1	–	7	3	–	8
VMI	0	–	8	1	–	10
$ – Conference champion; ^ – FCS playoff participant; Rankings from STATS Poll

The 2022 VMI Keydets football team represented the Virginia Military Institute as a member of the Southern Conference (SoCon) during the 2022 NCAA Division I FCS football season. The Keydets were led by eighth-year head coach Scott Wachenheim and played their home games at Alumni Memorial Field in Lexington, Virginia.

== Schedule ==
Date	Time	Opponent	Site	TV	Result	Attendance
September 1	7:30 p.m.	at No. 22 (FBS) Wake Forest*	Truist Field at Wake Forest; Winston-Salem, NC	ACCN	L 10–44	26,013
September 10	1:30 p.m.	Bucknell*	Alumni Memorial Field; Lexington, VA	ESPN+	W 24–14	5,000
September 17	1:30 p.m.	Cornell*	Alumni Memorial Field; Lexington, VA	ESPN+	L 22–28	5,074
October 1	3:30 p.m.	at Western Carolina	Bob Waters Field at E. J. Whitmire Stadium; Cullowhee, NC	ESPN+	L 17–38	11,103
October 8	1:30 p.m.	East Tennessee State	Alumni Memorial Field; Lexington, VA	ESPN+	L 21–44	6,324
October 15	1:30 p.m.	at No. 10 Chattanooga	Finley Stadium; Chattanooga, TN	ESPN3	L 13–41	6,284
October 22	1:30 p.m.	Furman	Alumni Memorial Field; Lexington, VA	ESPN+	L 3–41	5,487
October 29	1:30 p.m.	No. 16 Mercer	Alumni Memorial Field; Lexington, VA	ESPN+	L 14–55	5,133
November 5	3:00 p.m.	at No. 10 Samford	Seibert Stadium; Homewood, AL	ESPN+	L 15–34	5,375
November 12	1:30 p.m.	at Wofford	Gibbs Stadium; Spartanburg, SC	ESPN+	L 16–34	3,905
November 19	12:00pm	The Citadel	Alumni Memorial Field; Lexington, VA (Military Classic of the South)	ESPN+	L 22–26	7,432
*Non-conference game; Rankings from STATS Poll released prior to the game; All times are in Eastern time

== Game summaries ==
=== At No. 22 (FBS) Wake Forest ===
	1	2	3	4	Total
Keydets	0	3	7	0	10
No. 22 (FBS) Demon Deacons	17	6	14	7	44

=== Bucknell ===
	1	2	3	4	Total
Bison	0	0	6	8	14
Keydets	14	7	3	0	24

=== Cornell ===
	1	2	3	4	Total
Big Red	7	14	0	7	28
Keydets	2	0	0	20	22

=== At Western Carolina ===
	1	2	3	4	Total
Keydets	7	3	7	0	17
Catamounts	14	7	10	7	38

=== East Tennessee State ===
	1	2	3	4	Total
Buccaneers	14	13	7	10	44
Keydets	7	0	7	7	21

=== At No. 10 Chattanooga ===
	1	2	3	4	Total
Keydets	7	0	6	0	13
No. 10 Mocs	21	10	0	10	41

=== Furman ===
	1	2	3	4	Total
Paladins	3	21	3	14	41
Keydets	0	3	0	0	3

=== No. 16 Mercer ===
	1	2	3	4	Total
No. 16 Bears	7	24	14	10	55
Keydets	0	0	14	0	14

=== At No. 10 Samford ===
	1	2	3	4	Total
Keydets	6	6	3	0	15
No. 10 Samford Bulldogs	0	7	13	14	34

=== At Wofford ===
	1	2	3	4	Total
Keydets	0	10	0	6	16
Terriers	21	3	7	3	34

=== The Citadel ===
	1	2	3	4	Total
Citadel Bulldogs	0	14	0	12	26
Keydets	3	0	19	0	22
