= 2022 Wofford Terriers football team =

American college football season

2022 Wofford Terriers football
- Conference: Southern Conference
- Record: 3–8 (3–5 SoCon)
- Head coach: Josh Conklin (5th season; first 5 games); Shawn Watson (interim, games 6–11)
- Offensive coordinator: Shawn Watson (1st season)
- Co-offensive coordinators: Tyler Carlton (1st season); Dane Romero (1st season)
- Co-defensive coordinators: Rob Greene (3rd season); Andrew Warwick (1st season)
- Home stadium: Gibbs Stadium

2022 Southern Conference football standings
	Conf.			Overall
Team	W		L	W		L
No. 7 Samford $^	8	–	0	11	–	2
No. 10 Furman ^	7	–	1	10	–	3
No. 23 Chattanooga	5	–	3	7	–	4
No. 24 Mercer	5	–	3	7	–	4
Western Carolina	4	–	4	6	–	5
Wofford	3	–	5	3	–	8
The Citadel	3	–	5	4	–	7
East Tennessee State	1	–	7	3	–	8
VMI	0	–	8	1	–	10
$ – Conference champion; ^ – FCS playoff participant; Rankings from STATS Poll

The 2022 Wofford Terriers football team represented Wofford College as a member of the Southern Conference (SoCon) during the 2022 NCAA Division I FCS football season. The Terriers were led by fifth-year head coach Josh Conklin and played their home games at Gibbs Stadium in Spartanburg, South Carolina. Conklin resigned as head coach following their fifth game and Shawn Watson was promoted to interim head coach for the remainder of the season.

== Schedule ==
Date	Time	Opponent	Site	TV	Result	Attendance
September 3	6:00 p.m.	at No. 12 Chattanooga	Finley Stadium; Chattanooga, TN		L 0–31	7,123
September 10	6:00 p.m.	Elon*	Gibbs Stadium; Spartanburg, SC	ESPN+	L 0–26	2,549
September 17	11:00 a.m.	at Virginia Tech*	Lane Stadium; Blacksburg, VA	ACCN	L 7–27	62,043
September 24	6:00 p.m.	at Kennesaw State*	Fifth Third Bank Stadium; Kennesaw, GA	ESPN+	L 22–24	7,154
October 1	1:30 p.m.	No. 13 Mercer	Gibbs Stadium; Spartanburg, SC	ESPN+	L 7–42	4,087
October 8	1:00 p.m.	at No. 13 Samford	Seibert Stadium; Homewood, AL	ESPN+	L 14–28	3,513
October 15	1:30 p.m.	The Citadel	Gibbs Stadium; Spartanburg, SC (rivalry)	ESPN+	W 31–16	4,198
October 29	1:30 p.m.	East Tennessee State^{†}	Gibbs Stadium; Spartanburg, SC	ESPN+	W 48–41	5,849
November 5	2:00 p.m.	at Western Carolina	Bob Waters Field at E. J. Whitmire Stadium; Cullowhee, NC		L 29–36	10,107
November 12	1:30 p.m.	VMI	Gibbs Stadium; Spartanburg, SC	ESPN+	W 34–16	3,905
November 19	1:00 p.m.	at No. 12 Furman	Paladin Stadium; Greenville, SC (rivalry)	ESPN+	L 28–63	10,117
*Non-conference game; ^{†}Homecoming; Rankings from STATS Poll released prior to the game; All times are in Eastern time

== Game summaries ==
=== At No. 12 Chattanooga ===
	1	2	3	4	Total
Terriers	0	0	0	0	0
No. 12 Mocs	10	14	7	0	31

=== Elon ===
	1	2	3	4	Total
Phoenix	3	9	7	7	26
Terriers	0	0	0	0	0

=== At Virginia Tech ===
	1	2	3	4	Total
Terriers	0	0	0	7	7
Hokies	3	17	0	7	27

=== At Kennesaw State ===
	1	2	3	4	Total
Terriers	6	3	0	13	22
Owls	14	0	7	3	24

=== No. 13 Mercer ===
	1	2	3	4	Total
No. 13 Bears	14	7	14	7	42
Terriers	0	0	7	0	7

=== At No. 13 Samford ===
	1	2	3	4	Total
Terriers	0	0	7	7	14
No. 13 Samford Bulldogs	7	7	14	0	28

=== The Citadel ===
	1	2	3	4	Total
Citadel Bulldogs	0	7	0	9	16
Terriers	7	17	7	0	31

=== East Tennessee State ===
	1	2	3	4	Total
Buccaneers	3	14	10	14	41
Terriers	7	10	10	21	48

=== At Western Carolina ===
	1	2	3	4	Total
Terriers	7	7	7	8	29
Catamounts	3	9	14	10	36

=== VMI ===
	1	2	3	4	Total
Keydets	0	10	0	6	16
Terriers	21	3	7	3	34

=== At No. 12 Furman ===
	1	2	3	4	Total
Terriers	14	7	0	7	28
No. 12 Paladins	21	21	21	0	63
