= 2022 Western Carolina Catamounts football team =

American college football season

2022 Western Carolina Catamounts football
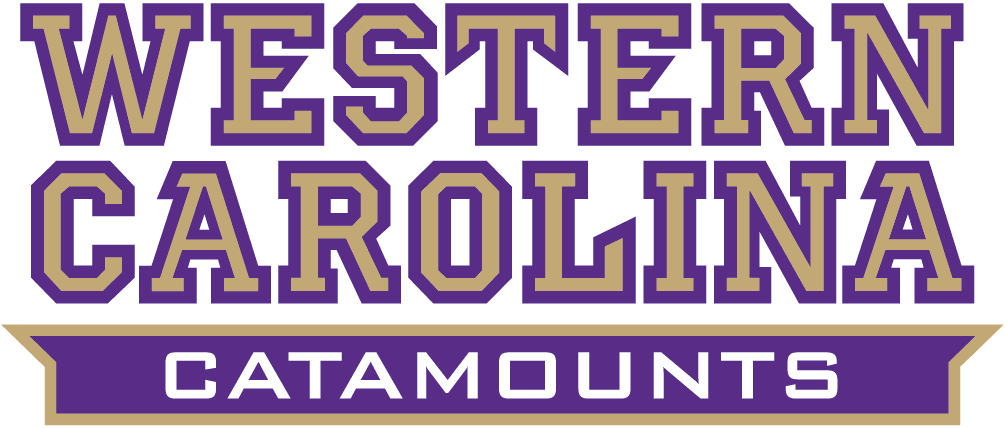
- Conference: Southern Conference
- Record: 6–5 (4–4 SoCon)
- Head coach: Kerwin Bell (2nd season)
- Offensive coordinator: Kade Bell (2nd season)
- Offensive scheme: No-huddle spread
- Defensive coordinator: Chaz Scales (2nd season)
- Base defense: 4–3
- Home stadium: Bob Waters Field at E. J. Whitmire Stadium

2022 Southern Conference football standings
	Conf.			Overall
Team	W		L	W		L
No. 7 Samford $^	8	–	0	11	–	2
No. 10 Furman ^	7	–	1	10	–	3
No. 23 Chattanooga	5	–	3	7	–	4
No. 24 Mercer	5	–	3	7	–	4
Western Carolina	4	–	4	6	–	5
Wofford	3	–	5	3	–	8
The Citadel	3	–	5	4	–	7
East Tennessee State	1	–	7	3	–	8
VMI	0	–	8	1	–	10
$ – Conference champion; ^ – FCS playoff participant; Rankings from STATS Poll

The 2022 Western Carolina Catamounts football team represented the Western Carolina University as a member of the Southern Conference (SoCon) during the 2022 NCAA Division I FCS football season. Led by second-year head coach Kerwin Bell the Catamounts played their home games at Bob Waters Field at E. J. Whitmire Stadium in Cullowhee, North Carolina.

== Schedule ==
Date	Time	Opponent	Site	TV	Result	Attendance
September 3	12:00 p.m.	at Charleston Southern*	Buccaneer Field; North Charleston, SC		W 52–38	3,922
September 10	7:00 p.m.	at Georgia Tech*	Bobby Dodd Stadium; Atlanta, GA	ACCNX	L 17–35	36,486
September 17	3:30 p.m.	Presbyterian*	Bob Waters Field at E. J. Whitmire Stadium; Cullowhee, NC	ESPN+	W 77–21	11,776
September 24	3:00 p.m.	at No. 21 Samford	Seibert Stadium; Homewood, AL	ESPN+	L 12–35	7,519
October 1	3:30 p.m.	VMI	Bob Waters Field at E. J. Whitmire Stadium; Cullowhee, NC	ESPN+	W 38–17	11,103
October 8	4:00 p.m.	at No. 12 Mercer	Five Star Stadium; Macon, GA	ESPN+	L 6–49	10,927
October 15	2:00 p.m.	at Furman	Paladin Stadium; Greenville, SC		L 40–47	9,617
October 22	2:00 p.m.	The Citadel	Bob Waters Field at E. J. Whitmire Stadium; Cullowhee, NC	ESPN+	L 21–34	7,304
November 5	2:00 p.m.	Wofford^{†}	Bob Waters Field at E. J. Whitmire Stadium; Cullowhee, NC	ESPN+	W 36–29	10,107
November 12	1:00 p.m.	at East Tennessee State	William B. Greene Jr. Stadium; Johnson City, TN	ESPN+	W 20–17	7,244
November 19	1:00 p.m.	No. 15 Chattanooga	Bob Waters Field at E. J. Whitmire Stadium; Cullowhee, NC	ESPN+	W 32–29	9,089
*Non-conference game; ^{†}Homecoming; Rankings from STATS Poll released prior to the game; All times are in Eastern time

== Game summaries ==
=== At Charleston Southern ===
	1	2	3	4	Total
Catamounts	17	14	14	7	52
Buccaneers	7	10	14	7	38

=== At Georgia Tech ===
	1	2	3	4	Total
Catamounts	14	0	0	3	17
Yellow Jackets	14	14	7	0	35

=== Presbyterian ===
	1	2	3	4	Total
Blue Hose	0	7	7	7	21
Catamounts	7	21	28	21	77

=== At No. 21 Samford ===
	1	2	3	4	Total
Catamounts	0	3	6	3	12
No. 21 Bulldogs	7	7	7	14	35

=== VMI ===
	1	2	3	4	Total
Keydets	7	3	7	0	17
Catamounts	14	7	10	7	38

=== At No. 12 Mercer ===
	1	2	3	4	Total
Catamounts	0	0	6	0	6
No. 12 Bears	21	21	0	7	49

=== At Furman ===
	1	2	3	4	Total
Catamounts	7	13	0	20	40
Paladins	14	13	17	3	47

=== The Citadel ===
	1	2	3	4	Total
Citadel Bulldogs	7	17	7	3	34
Catamounts	0	0	7	14	21

=== Wofford ===
	1	2	3	4	Total
Terriers	7	7	7	8	29
Catamounts	3	9	14	10	36

=== At East Tennessee State ===
	1	2	3	4	Total
Catamounts	7	3	0	10	20
Buccaneers	7	7	0	3	17

=== No. 15 Chattanooga ===
	1	2	3	4	Total
No. 15 Mocs	7	7	9	6	29
Catamounts	7	7	7	11	32
