= Shawn Watson =

American football player and coach (born 1959)

Current position
- Title: Head coach
- Team: Wofford
- Conference: SoCon
- Record: 16–27

Biographical details
- Born: September 21, 1959 (age 67); Carbondale, Illinois, U.S.

Playing career
- 1978: Illinois
- 1979–1980: Southern Illinois
- Position: Free safety

Coaching career (HC unless noted)
- 1982: Southern Illinois (GA)
- 1983–1984: Illinois (GA)
- 1985: Illinois (TE/OT)
- 1986: Illinois (WR)
- 1987–1989: Miami (OH) (TE)
- 1990–1991: Miami (OH) (WR)
- 1992–1993: Miami (OH) (QB/RC)
- 1994–1996: Southern Illinois
- 1997–1998: Northwestern (QB)
- 1999: Colorado (QB)
- 2000–2005: Colorado (OC/QB)
- 2006: Nebraska (TE/RC)
- 2007–2010: Nebraska (OC/QB)
- 2011–2013: Louisville (OC/QB)
- 2014–2015: Texas (AHC/QB)
- 2016: Indiana (OQC)
- 2016: Indiana (QB)
- 2017–2018: Pittsburgh (OC/QB)
- 2019: Georgia (OQC)
- 2020–2021: Northern Iowa (OA/QB)
- 2022: Wofford (AHC/OC/QB/Interim HC)
- 2022–present: Wofford

Head coaching record
- Overall: 27–49

Accomplishments and honors

Championships
- 1 National (1990)

Shawn Watson (born September 21, 1959) is an American football coach. He is currently the head coach at Wofford College, a position he has held since October 6, 2022 after the resignation of Josh Conklin. Watson served as the head football coach at Southern Illinois University Carbondale from 1994 to 1996, compiling a record of 11–22. He was the offensive coordinator at the University of Colorado Boulder (2000–2005), the University of Nebraska–Lincoln (2007–2010), the University of Louisville (2011–2013), and the University of Pittsburgh (2017–2018).

== Early life ==
Watson was born in Carbondale, Illinois on September 21, 1959, and graduated from Carterville High School in Carterville, Illinois and SIU.

== Coaching career ==
Watson began his football coaching career as a graduate assistant in 1982 at Southern Illinois; the same school where he had completed his playing career.

His first full-time position was at the University of Illinois at Urbana–Champaign, where he started as a graduate assistant for two years beginning in 1983 before promotions to offensive tackles coach, tight ends coach, and wide receivers coach by 1986. Illinois participated in two bowl games during Watson's time there, including the 1984 Rose Bowl.

Beginning in 1987, Watson coached in various positions at Miami University across seven years, starting as wide receivers coach, and moving through positions as tight ends coach, wide receivers coach and completing his career at Miami in 1993 as quarterbacks coach and recruiting coordinator.

In 1994, Watson obtained his first appointment as a head coach when he was hired to take control of the program where he started his playing and coaching careers; Southern Illinois. SIU had gone 15–29 in the four years prior to Watson's arrival, and his first year was a rough start to his head coaching career as SIU finished 1–10. SIU finished the next two seasons with repeat 5–6 records before Watson moved on, finishing with an overall head coaching record to date of 11–22. During Watson's three-year tenure at SIU he produced 20 all-conference players and an NFL-drafted tight end in Damon Jones.

In 1997, Watson was hired by head coach Gary Barnett at Northwestern University as quarterbacks coach. When Barnett was later hired as head coach by the University of Colorado in 1999, Watson also followed and continued for a year as quarterbacks coach. In 2000, Watson was promoted to Offensive Coordinator at Colorado while maintaining his role with the quarterbacks, and remained in that role until Barnett's firing at the conclusion of the 2005 season.

In 2006, head coach Bill Callahan hired Watson to the position of tight ends coach and recruiting coordinator at the University of Nebraska, and he was subsequently promoted the following year to the same position he had held at Colorado, offensive coordinator and quarterbacks coach. When Callahan was fired at the conclusion of the 2007 season, Watson was one of two members of Callahan's staff that were retained under new Nebraska head coach, Bo Pelini.

Watson was not retained in a 2011 realignment of assistant coaches at Nebraska, and was subsequently hired as the quarterbacks coach at the University of Louisville.

After a lackluster offensive performance against Marshall, offensive coordinator Mike Sanford did not travel with the Cardinals for their next game, against North Carolina. Watson was named the play-caller for that game. CBSSports.com's Brett McMurphy reported that Sanford had been fired and replaced by Watson. However, The Courier-Journal's Rick Bozich reported that Sanford was still with the team, but may be demoted to a position coach. Bozich later confirmed that Sanford was no longer offensive coordinator.

The following Monday, head coach Charlie Strong announced that Watson would serve as offensive coordinator for the remainder of the season.

Perhaps Watson's trademark game came in the 2013 Sugar Bowl, where Louisville defeated No. 4 Florida. Louisville's offense, led by quarterback Teddy Bridgewater, scored over 30 points and racked up over 330 yards of offense on a top-five Florida defense. On December 12, 2015, the University of Texas announced it would not be extending Watson's contract, thereby ending his tenure as the school's offensive coordinator and quarterback's coach.

Watson was hired as offensive quality control coach at Indiana in 2016, and then was promoted to quarterback coach after the resignation of Kevin Wilson.

On February 2, 2017, Watson was hired as offensive coordinator at the University of Pittsburgh. On January 4, 2019, Watson was let go as offensive coordinator. On February 8, 2019, Georgia hired Watson as their offensive quality control coach.

On March 19, 2020, Mark Farley, head football coach at the University of Northern Iowa, tabbed coaching Watson as a new offensive assistant for the Panthers, joining former Nebraska quarterback Joe Ganz on Northern Iowa's coaching staff.

== Head coaching record ==
Year	Team	Overall	Conference	Standing	Bowl/playoffs
Southern Illinois Salukis (Gateway Football Conference) (1994–1996)
1994	Southern Illinois	1–10	1–5	T–6th	
1995	Southern Illinois	5–6	2–4	T–5th	
1996	Southern Illinois	5–6	1–4	5th	
Southern Illinois:		11–22	4–13		
Wofford Terriers (Southern Conference) (2022–present)
2022	Wofford	3–3 (Note: Served as interim head coach after Josh Conklin resigned after 5 games.)	3–3	T–6th	
2023	Wofford	2–9	2–6	T–7th	
2024	Wofford	5–7	3–5	T–6th	
2025	Wofford	6–6	5–3	T–3rd	
Wofford:		16–27	13–17		
Total:		27–49			
