= 2022 The Citadel Bulldogs football team =

American college football season

2022 The Citadel Bulldogs football
- Conference: Southern Conference
- Record: 4–7 (3–5 SoCon)
- Head coach: Brent Thompson (7th season)
- Offensive coordinator: Lou Conte (7th season)
- Offensive scheme: Triple option
- Defensive coordinator: Tony Grantham (4th season)
- Base defense: 3–4
- Home stadium: Johnson Hagood Stadium

2022 Southern Conference football standings
	Conf.			Overall
Team	W		L	W		L
No. 7 Samford $^	8	–	0	11	–	2
No. 10 Furman ^	7	–	1	10	–	3
No. 23 Chattanooga	5	–	3	7	–	4
No. 24 Mercer	5	–	3	7	–	4
Western Carolina	4	–	4	6	–	5
Wofford	3	–	5	3	–	8
The Citadel	3	–	5	4	–	7
East Tennessee State	1	–	7	3	–	8
VMI	0	–	8	1	–	10
$ – Conference champion; ^ – FCS playoff participant; Rankings from STATS Poll

The 2022 The Citadel Bulldogs football team represented The Citadel as a member of the Southern Conference (SoCon) during the 2022 NCAA Division I FCS football season. The Bulldogs were led by seventh-year head coach Brent Thompson and played their home games at Johnson Hagood Stadium in Charleston, South Carolina.

== Schedule ==
Date	Time	Opponent	Site	TV	Result	Attendance
September 1	6:00 p.m.	at Campbell*	Barker–Lane Stadium; Buies Creek, NC	ESPN+	L 10–29	4,010
September 10	4:00 p.m.	No. 9 East Tennessee State	Johnson Hagood Stadium; Charleston, SC	ESPN+	W 20–17	8,573
September 17	6:00 p.m.	at No. 20 Mercer	Five Star Stadium; Macon, GA	ESPN3	L 0–17	11,339
October 1	3:30 p.m.	at Appalachian State*	Kidd Brewer Stadium; Boone, NC	ESPN+	L 0–49	30,789
October 8	2:00 p.m.	Furman	Johnson Hagood Stadium; Charleston, SC (rivalry)	ESPN3	L 10–21	12,106
October 15	1:30 p.m.	at Wofford	Gibbs Stadium; Spartanburg, SC (rivalry)	ESPN+	L 16–31	4,198
October 22	2:00 p.m.	at Western Carolina	Bob Waters Field at E. J. Whitmire Stadium; Cullowhee, NC	ESPN+	W 34–21	7,304
October 29	2:00 p.m.	No. 13 Samford	Johnson Hagood Stadium; Charleston, SC	ESPN+	L 3–38	8,603
November 5	2:00 p.m.	No. 11 Chattanooga^{†}	Johnson Hagood Stadium; Charleston, SC	ESPN+	L 21–31	12,106
November 12	2:00 p.m.	Virginia–Lynchburg*	Johnson Hagood Stadium; Charleston, SC	ESPN3	W 66–0	7,938
November 19	12:00 p.m.	at VMI	Alumni Memorial Field; Lexington, VA (Military Classic of the South)	ESPN+	W 26–22	7,432
*Non-conference game; ^{†}Homecoming; Rankings from STATS Poll released prior to the game; All times are in Eastern time

== Game summaries ==
=== At Campbell ===
	1	2	3	4	Total
Citadel Bulldogs	3	0	0	7	10
Fighting Camels	7	10	6	6	29

=== No. 9 East Tennessee State ===
	1	2	3	4	Total
No. 9 Buccaneers	0	7	7	3	17
Citadel Bulldogs	3	7	7	3	20

=== At No. 20 Mercer ===
	1	2	3	4	Total
Citadel Bulldogs	0	0	0	0	0
No. 20 Bears	0	0	14	3	17

=== At Appalachian State ===
The Citadel Bulldogs (1–2) at Appalachian State Mountaineers (2–2) – Game summary

Quarter	1	2	3	4	Total
Bulldogs	0	0	0	0	0
Mountaineers	14	21	7	7	49

at Kidd Brewer Stadium, Boone, North Carolina

- Date: October 1
- Game time: 3:30 p.m. EDT
- Game weather: Rain, 50 °F (10 °C)
- Game attendance: 30,789
- Referee: Javarro Edwards
- TV announcers (ESPN+): David Jackson and Avery Hall

Game information
First quarter
- APP – Dashaun Davis 44 yard pass from Chase Brice (Michael Hughs kick), 12:18. Mountaineers 7–0. Drive: 6 plays, 74 yards, 2:37.
- APP – Chase Brice 1 yard run (Michael Hughs kick), 2:38. Mountaineers 14–0. Drive: 8 plays, 75 yards, 3:54.

Second quarter'

- APP – Eli Wilson 8 yard pass from Chase Brice (Michael Hughs kick), 11:55. Mountaineers 21–0. Drive: 8 plays, 65 yards, 3:35.
- APP – Camerun Peoples 73 yard run (Michael Hughs kick), 9:31. Mountaineers 28–0. Drive: 1 play, 73 yards, 0:15.
- APP – Christian Horn 22 yard pass from Chase Brice (Michael Hughs kick), 4:56. Mountaineers 35–0. Drive: 3 plays, 33 yards, 0:46.

Third quarter

- APP – Christian Horn 80 yard pass from Chase Brice (Michael Hughs kick), 3:23. Mountaineers 42–0. Drive: 1 play, 80 yards, 0:15.

Fourth quarter

- APP – Kanye Roberts 4 yard run (Michael Hughs kick), 6:40. Mountaineers 49–0. Drive: 7 plays, 60 yards, 3:20.

Statistics

Statistics	CIT	APP
First downs	13	21
Total yards	223	545
Rushing yards	172	247
Passing yards	51	298
Turnovers	2	0
Time of possession	39:51	20:04

Team	Category	Player	Statistics
The Citadel	Passing	Peyton Derrick	2/7, 45 yards, 1 INT
The Citadel	Rushing	Sam Llewellyn	10 carries, 41 yards
The Citadel	Receiving	Jay Graves-Billips	2 receptions, 42 yards
Appalachian State	Passing	Chase Brice	12/18, 265 yards, 4 TD
Appalachian State	Rushing	Camerun Peoples	4 carries, 102 yards, 1 TD
Appalachian State	Receiving	Christian Horn	3 receptions 132 yards, 2 TD

=== Furman ===
	1	2	3	4	Total
Paladins	7	0	14	0	21
Citadel Bulldogs	0	3	7	0	10

=== At Wofford ===
	1	2	3	4	Total
Citadel Bulldogs	0	7	0	9	16
Terriers	7	17	7	0	31

=== At Western Carolina ===
	1	2	3	4	Total
Citadel Bulldogs	7	17	7	3	34
Catamounts	0	0	7	14	21

=== No. 13 Samford ===
	1	2	3	4	Total
No. 13 Samford Bulldogs	7	14	10	7	38
Citadel Bulldogs	0	3	0	0	3

=== No. 11 Chattanooga ===
	1	2	3	4	Total
No. 11 Mocs	3	7	14	7	31
Citadel Bulldogs	7	0	0	14	21

=== Virginia-Lynchburg ===
	1	2	3	4	Total
Dragons	0	0	0	0	0
Citadel Bulldogs	17	7	21	21	66

=== At VMI ===
	1	2	3	4	Total
Citadel Bulldogs	0	14	0	12	26
Keydets	3	0	19	0	22
