= 2022 Furman Paladins football team =

American college football season

2022 Furman Paladins football

NCAA Division I Second Round, L 38–41 at Incarnate Word
- Conference: Southern Conference

Ranking
- STATS: No. 10
- FCS Coaches: No. 10
- Record: 10–3 (7–1 SoCon)
- Head coach: Clay Hendrix (6th season)
- Co-offensive coordinators: Chad Byers (1st season); Justin Roper (1st season)
- Defensive coordinator: Duane Vaughn (4th season)
- Home stadium: Paladin Stadium

2022 Southern Conference football standings
	Conf.			Overall
Team	W		L	W		L
No. 7 Samford $^	8	–	0	11	–	2
No. 10 Furman ^	7	–	1	10	–	3
No. 23 Chattanooga	5	–	3	7	–	4
No. 24 Mercer	5	–	3	7	–	4
Western Carolina	4	–	4	6	–	5
Wofford	3	–	5	3	–	8
The Citadel	3	–	5	4	–	7
East Tennessee State	1	–	7	3	–	8
VMI	0	–	8	1	–	10
$ – Conference champion; ^ – FCS playoff participant; Rankings from STATS Poll

The 2022 Furman Paladins football team represented Furman University as a member of the Southern Conference (SoCon) during the 2022 NCAA Division I FCS football season. The Paladins were led by sixth-year head coach Clay Hendrix and played their home games at Paladin Stadium in Greenville, South Carolina.

With a win over Elon in the first round of the 2022 NCAA Division I Football Championship, Furman completed their first 10-win season for the first time since 2005. They would fall to Incarnate Word in the second round.

== Schedule ==
Date	Time	Opponent	Rank	Site	TV	Result	Attendance
September 1	7:00 p.m.	North Greenville*		Paladin Stadium; Greenville, SC	ESPN3	W 52–0	9,264
September 10	3:30 p.m.	at No. 5 (FBS) Clemson*		Memorial Stadium; Clemson, SC	ACCN	L 12–35	78,302
September 17	7:30 p.m.	at No. 18 East Tennessee State		William B. Greene Jr. Stadium; Johnson City, TN	ESPN+	W 27–14	9,836
September 24	12:00 p.m.	at Charleston Southern*		Buccaneer Field; North Charleston, SC	ESPN+	W 24–19	3,715
October 1	2:00 p.m.	No. 16 Samford		Paladin Stadium; Greenville, SC	ESPN+	L 27–34	9,507
October 8	2:00 p.m.	at The Citadel		Johnson Hagood Stadium; Charleston, SC (rivalry)	ESPN3	W 21–10	12,106
October 15	2:00 p.m.	Western Carolina		Paladin Stadium; Greenville, SC	ESPN+	W 47–40	9,617
October 22	1:30 p.m.	at VMI		Alumni Memorial Field; Lexington, VA	ESPN+	W 41–3	5,487
October 29	2:00 p.m.	No. 7 Chattanooga^{†}	No. 24	Paladin Stadium; Greenville, SC	ESPN3	W 24–20	9,724
November 12	3:00 p.m.	at No. 14 Mercer	No. 13	Five Star Stadium; Macon, GA	ESPN+	W 23–13	11,729
November 19	1:00 p.m.	Wofford	No. 12	Paladin Stadium; Greenville, SC (rivalry)	ESPN+	W 63–28	10,117
November 26	12:00 p.m.	No. 12 Elon*	No. 11	Paladin Stadium; Greenville, SC (NCAA Division I First Round)	ESPN+	W 31–6	2,717
December 3	2:00 p.m.	at No. 5 Incarnate Word*	No. 11	Gayle and Tom Benson Stadium; San Antonio, TX (NCAA Division I Second Round)	ESPN+	L 38–41	2,373
*Non-conference game; ^{†}Homecoming; Rankings from STATS Poll released prior to the game; All times are in Eastern time

== Game summaries ==
=== North Greenville ===
	1	2	3	4	Total
Crusaders	0	0	0	0	0
Paladins	21	24	0	7	52

=== At No. 5 (FBS) Clemson ===
	1	2	3	4	Total
Paladins	3	6	3	0	12
No. 5 (FBS) Tigers	14	14	7	0	35

=== At No. 18 East Tennessee State ===
	1	2	3	4	Total
Paladins	3	10	7	7	27
No. 18 Buccaneers	7	0	7	0	14

=== At Charleston Southern ===
	1	2	3	4	Total
Paladins	3	7	7	7	24
Buccaneers	7	2	10	0	19

=== No. 16 Samford ===
	1	2	3	4	Total
No. 16 Samford Bulldogs	0	20	14	0	34
Paladins	10	7	0	10	27

=== At The Citadel ===
	1	2	3	4	Total
Paladins	7	0	14	0	21
Citadel Bulldogs	0	3	7	0	10

=== Western Carolina ===
	1	2	3	4	Total
Catamounts	7	13	0	20	40
Paladins	14	13	17	3	47

=== At VMI ===
	1	2	3	4	Total
Paladins	3	21	3	14	41
Keydets	0	3	0	0	3

=== No. 7 Chattanooga ===
	1	2	3	4	Total
No. 7 Mocs	3	7	3	7	20
No. 24 Paladins	7	10	7	0	24

=== At No. 14 Mercer ===
	1	2	3	4	Total
No. 13 Paladins	3	7	10	3	23
No. 14 Bears	0	7	0	6	13

=== Wofford ===
	1	2	3	4	Total
Terriers	14	7	0	7	28
No. 12 Paladins	21	21	21	0	63

== FCS Playoffs ==
=== No. 12 Elon – first round ===
	1	2	3	4	Total
No. 12 Phoenix	3	0	0	3	6
No. 11 Paladins	7	7	3	14	31

=== At No. 5 Incarnate Word – second round ===
	1	2	3	4	Total
No. 11 Paladins	17	0	7	14	38
No. 5 Cardinals	14	14	3	10	41
