= 2022 East Tennessee State Buccaneers football team =

American college football season

2022 East Tennessee State Buccaneers football
- Conference: Southern Conference
- Record: 3–8 (1–7 SoCon)
- Head coach: George Quarles (1st season)
- Offensive coordinator: Adam Neugebauer (1st season)
- Defensive coordinator: Billy Taylor (8th season)
- Home stadium: William B. Greene Jr. Stadium

2022 Southern Conference football standings
	Conf.			Overall
Team	W		L	W		L
No. 7 Samford $^	8	–	0	11	–	2
No. 10 Furman ^	7	–	1	10	–	3
No. 23 Chattanooga	5	–	3	7	–	4
No. 24 Mercer	5	–	3	7	–	4
Western Carolina	4	–	4	6	–	5
Wofford	3	–	5	3	–	8
The Citadel	3	–	5	4	–	7
East Tennessee State	1	–	7	3	–	8
VMI	0	–	8	1	–	10
$ – Conference champion; ^ – FCS playoff participant; Rankings from STATS Poll

The 2022 East Tennessee State Buccaneers football team represented East Tennessee State University as a member of the Southern Conference (SoCon) during the 2022 NCAA Division I FCS football season. The Buccaneers were led by first-year head coach George Quarles and play their home games at William B. Greene Jr. Stadium in Johnson City, Tennessee.

== Schedule ==
Date	Time	Opponent	Rank	Site	TV	Result	Attendance
September 1	7:30 p.m.	Mars Hill*	No. 11	William B. Greene Jr. Stadium; Johnson City, TN	ESPN+	W 44–7	9,701
September 10	4:00 p.m.	at The Citadel	No. 9	Johnson Hagood Stadium; Charleston, SC	ESPN+	L 17–20	8,573
September 17	7:30 p.m.	Furman	No. 18	William B. Greene Jr. Stadium; Johnson City, TN	ESPN+	L 14–27	9,836
September 24	12:00 p.m.	at Robert Morris*		Joe Walton Stadium; Moon Township, PA	ESPN+	W 45–3	2,629
October 1	3:00 p.m.	No. 12 Chattanooga		William B. Greene Jr. Stadium; Johnson City, TN	ESPN+	L 16–24	10,247
October 8	1:30 p.m.	at VMI		Alumni Memorial Field; Lexington, VA		W 44–21	6,324
October 15	4:00 p.m.	at No. 12 Mercer		Five Star Stadium; Macon, GA	ESPN+	L 33–55	10,002
October 22	3:30 p.m.	No. 15 Samford^{†}		William B. Greene Jr. Stadium; Johnson City, TN	ESPN3	L 45–55	10,327
October 29	1:30 p.m.	at Wofford		Gibbs Stadium; Spartanburg, SC	ESPN+	L 41–48	5,849
November 12	1:00 p.m.	Western Carolina		William B. Greene Jr. Stadium; Johnson City, TN	ESPN+	L 17–20	7,244
November 19	12:00 p.m.	at Mississippi State*		Davis Wade Stadium; Starkville, MS	ESPN+	L 7–56	49,117
*Non-conference game; ^{†}Homecoming; Rankings from STATS Poll released prior to the game; All times are in Eastern time

== Game summaries ==
=== Mars Hill ===
	1	2	3	4	Total
Lions	0	0	7	0	7
No. 11 Buccaneers	20	14	10	0	44

=== At The Citadel ===
	1	2	3	4	Total
No. 9 Buccaneers	0	7	7	3	17
Citadel Bulldogs	3	7	7	3	20

=== Furman ===
	1	2	3	4	Total
Paladins	3	10	7	7	27
No. 18 Buccaneers	7	0	7	0	14

=== At Robert Morris ===
	1	2	3	4	Total
Buccaneers	14	28	3	0	45
Colonials	0	0	0	3	3

=== No. 12 Chattanooga ===
	1	2	3	4	Total
No. 12 Mocs	0	0	3	21	24
Buccaneers	10	3	0	3	16

=== At VMI ===
	1	2	3	4	Total
Buccaneers	14	13	7	10	44
Keydets	7	0	7	7	21

=== At No. 12 Mercer ===
	1	2	3	4	Total
Buccaneers	3	17	6	7	33
No. 12 Bears	14	14	7	20	55

=== No. 15 Samford ===
	1	2	3	4	Total
No. 15 Samford Bulldogs	10	24	14	7	55
Buccaneers	10	14	7	14	45

=== At Wofford ===
	1	2	3	4	Total
Buccaneers	3	14	10	14	41
Terriers	7	10	10	21	48

=== Western Carolina ===
	1	2	3	4	Total
Catamounts	7	3	0	10	20
Buccaneers	7	7	0	3	17

=== At Mississippi State ===
	1	2	3	4	Total
Buccaneers	0	0	0	7	7
MSU Bulldogs	14	21	14	7	56
