= 2022 NCAA Division I FCS football season =

American college football season

2022 NCAA Division I FCS season

Regular season
- Number of teams: 130
- Duration: August 27 – December 3
- Payton Award: Incarnate Word quarterback Lindsey Scott Jr.
- Buchanan Award: Illinois State linebacker Zeke Vandenburgh

Playoff
- Duration: November 26 – December 17
- Championship date: January 8, 2023
- Championship site: Toyota Stadium, Frisco, Texas
- Champion: South Dakota State

NCAA Division I FCS football seasons
- «2021 2023»

The 2022 NCAA Division I FCS football season, part of college football in the United States, was organized by the National Collegiate Athletic Association (NCAA) at the Division I Football Championship Subdivision (FCS) level. The regular season began on August 27 and ended on November 19. The postseason began on November 26, and ended on January 8, 2023, with the 2023 NCAA Division I Football Championship Game at Toyota Stadium in Frisco, Texas. South Dakota State defeated defending champion North Dakota State, 45-21, to win the title.

== Conference changes and new programs ==
- The ASUN Conference and Western Athletic Conference renewed their football alliance for the 2022 season, after each suffered key losses of members starting FBS transitions (Jacksonville State and Sam Houston State), rendering them ineligible for a playoff automatic qualifier (AQ) as separate leagues. Eight alliance members (three WAC, five ASUN) competed for a single AQ in the FCS playoffs.
- After announcing a move to the Western Athletic Conference for the 2022 season in a November 2021 press conference, Incarnate Word reversed course in June 2022, just days before it was to officially join the WAC, and recommitted to the Southland Conference. At the same time, Lamar returned to the Southland after just one season in the WAC (and WAC–ASUN Challenge).

School	2021 conference	2022 conference
Austin Peay	Ohio Valley	WAC–ASUN Challenge (ASUN)
Bryant	NEC	Big South
Hampton	Big South	CAA
Jacksonville State	WAC–ASUN Challenge (ASUN)	ASUN
James Madison	CAA (FCS)	Sun Belt (FBS)
Kennesaw State	Big South	WAC–ASUN Challenge (ASUN)
Lamar	WAC–ASUN Challenge (WAC)	Southland
Lindenwood	GLVC (D-II)	Ohio Valley (FCS)
Monmouth	Big South	CAA
North Alabama	Big South	WAC–ASUN Challenge (ASUN)
Sam Houston State	WAC–ASUN Challenge (WAC)	WAC
Southern Utah	Big Sky	WAC–ASUN Challenge (WAC)
Stonehill	Northeast-10 (D-II)	NEC (FCS)
Texas A&M–Commerce	Lone Star (D-II)	Southland (FCS)

== Notable headlines ==
- August 31 – The Division I Board of Directors adopted a series of changes to transfer rules.
  - Transfer windows were adopted for all Division I sports. Student-athletes who wish to be immediately eligible at their next school must enter the NCAA transfer portal within the designated period(s) for their sport. For FCS football, two windows were established: a 45-day window starting the day after postseason selections are made, and a spring window from May 1–15. Accommodations will be made for participants in the FCS championship game.
  - Student-athletes who experience head coaching changes, or those whose athletic aid is reduced, canceled, or not renewed, may transfer outside designated windows without penalty.
  - Transferring student-athletes will be guaranteed their financial aid at their next school through graduation.
- September 21 – Houston Baptist University announced a name change to Houston Christian University, effective immediately.
- December 9 – In the highest-scoring game in FCS playoff history, Incarnate Word defeated previously unbeaten Sacramento State 66–63. UIW quarterback Lindsey Scott Jr. threw four touchdown passes to bring his season total to 59, surpassing the previous FCS record of 57 held by Jeremiah Briscoe of Sam Houston in 2016. Scott ended the season with 60, having thrown one TD pass in UIW's 35–32 semifinal loss to North Dakota State.

== FCS team wins over FBS teams ==
Italics denotes FBS teams.

Date	Visiting team	Home team	Site	Result	Attendance	Ref.
September 2	William & Mary	Charlotte	Jerry Richardson Stadium • Charlotte, North Carolina	41–24	13,940	
September 3	No. 19 Delaware	Navy	Navy–Marine Corps Memorial Stadium • Annapolis, Maryland	14–7	30,542	
September 10	Eastern Kentucky	Bowling Green	Doyt Perry Stadium • Bowling Green, Ohio	59–57 ^{7OT}	17,376	
September 10	No. 8 Incarnate Word	Nevada	Mackay Stadium • Reno, Nevada	55–41	14,092	
September 10	No. 15 Holy Cross	Buffalo	UB Stadium • Buffalo, New York	37–31	16,933	
September 10	No. 16 Weber State	Utah State	Maverik Stadium • Logan, Utah	35–7	17,781	
September 17	Southern Illinois	Northwestern	Ryan Field • Evanston, Illinois	31–24	23,146	
September 24	No. 7 Sacramento State	Colorado State	Canvas Stadium • Fort Collins, Colorado	41–10 (Note: Sacramento State was a 4.5-point favorite at kickoff.)	25,445	
^{#}Rankings from STATS poll released prior to the game.

== Conference standings ==
2022 ASUN Conference football standings
	Conf.			Overall
Team	W		L	W		L
Jacksonville State*	5	–	0	9	–	2
Austin Peay +	3	–	2	7	–	4
Eastern Kentucky +^	3	–	2	7	–	5
Central Arkansas +	3	–	2	5	–	6
Kennesaw State	1	–	4	5	–	6
North Alabama	0	–	5	1	–	10
+ – Conference co-champions; ^ – FCS playoff participant; Note: Jacksonville State ineligible for postseason play and ASUN title due to start of transition to FBS.; Rankings from STATS Poll

2022 Big Sky Conference football standings
	Conf.			Overall
Team	W		L	W		L
No. 4 Montana State +^	8	–	0	12	–	2
No. 5 Sacramento State +^	8	–	0	12	–	1
No. 9 Weber State ^	6	–	2	10	–	3
No. 18 Idaho ^	6	–	2	7	–	5
No. 25 UC Davis	5	–	3	6	–	5
No. 14 Montana ^	4	–	4	8	–	5
Portland State	3	–	5	4	–	7
Eastern Washington	2	–	6	3	–	8
Northern Colorado	2	–	6	3	–	8
Northern Arizona	2	–	6	3	–	8
Idaho State	1	–	7	1	–	10
Cal Poly	1	–	7	2	–	9
+ – Conference co-champions; ^ – FCS playoff participant; Rankings from STATS Poll

2022 Big South Conference football standings
	Conf.			Overall
Team	W		L	W		L
Gardner–Webb $^	5	–	0	7	–	6
North Carolina A&T	4	–	1	7	–	4
Campbell	2	–	3	5	–	6
Bryant	2	–	3	4	–	7
Charleston Southern	2	–	3	2	–	8
Robert Morris	0	–	5	0	–	11
$ – Conference champion; ^ – FCS playoff participant; Rankings from STATS Poll

2022 Colonial Athletic Association football standings
	Conf.			Overall
Team	W		L	W		L
No. 8 William & Mary +^	7	–	1	11	–	2
No. 13 New Hampshire +^	7	–	1	9	–	4
No. 11 Richmond ^	6	–	2	9	–	4
No. 17 Elon ^	6	–	2	8	–	4
Rhode Island	5	–	3	7	–	4
No. 19 Delaware ^	4	–	4	8	–	5
Towson	4	–	4	6	–	5
Villanova	4	–	4	6	–	5
Monmouth	3	–	5	5	–	6
Albany	2	–	6	3	–	8
Maine	2	–	6	2	–	9
Hampton	1	–	7	4	–	7
Stony Brook	1	–	7	2	–	9
+ – Conference co-champions; ^ – FCS playoff participant; Rankings from STATS Poll

2022 Ivy League football standings
	Conf.			Overall
Team	W		L	W		L
Yale $	6	–	1	8	–	2
Penn	5	–	2	8	–	2
Princeton	5	–	2	8	–	2
Harvard	4	–	3	6	–	4
Columbia	3	–	4	6	–	4
Cornell	2	–	5	5	–	5
Dartmouth	2	–	5	3	–	7
Brown	1	–	6	3	–	7
$ – Conference champion; Rankings from STATS Poll

2022 Mid-Eastern Athletic Conference football standings
	Conf.			Overall
Team	W		L	W		L
North Carolina Central +	4	–	1	10	–	2
Howard +	4	–	1	5	–	6
Delaware State	2	–	3	5	–	6
Morgan State	2	–	3	4	–	7
Norfolk State	2	–	3	2	–	9
South Carolina State	1	–	4	3	–	8
+ – Conference co-champions; Rankings from STATS Poll

2022 Missouri Valley Football Conference standings
	Conf.			Overall
Team	W		L	W		L
No. 1 South Dakota State $^	8	–	0	14	–	1
No. 2 North Dakota State ^	7	–	1	12	–	3
No. 20 North Dakota ^	5	–	3	7	–	5
Youngstown State	5	–	3	7	–	4
Northern Iowa	5	–	3	6	–	5
Illinois State	4	–	4	6	–	5
Southern Illinois	4	–	4	5	–	6
Missouri State	3	–	5	5	–	6
South Dakota	2	–	6	3	–	8
Indiana State	1	–	7	2	–	9
Western Illinois	0	–	8	0	–	11
$ – Conference champion; ^ – FCS playoff participant; Rankings from STATS Poll

2022 Northeast Conference football standings
	Conf.			Overall
Team	W		L	W		L
Saint Francis (PA) $^	7	–	0	9	–	3
Merrimack *	6	–	1	8	–	3
LIU	4	–	3	4	–	7
Duquesne	3	–	4	4	–	7
Sacred Heart	3	–	4	5	–	6
Central Connecticut	2	–	5	2	–	9
Stonehill *	2	–	5	4	–	5
Wagner	1	–	6	1	–	10
$ – Conference champion; ^ – FCS playoff participant; Note: Merrimack and Stonehill ineligible for NEC title and FCS postseason play due to transition from NCAA Division II; Rankings from STATS Poll

2022 Ohio Valley Conference football standings
	Conf.			Overall
Team	W		L	W		L
No. 15 Southeast Missouri State +^	5	–	0	9	–	3
UT Martin +	5	–	0	7	–	4
Tennessee State	2	–	3	4	–	7
Tennessee Tech	2	–	3	4	–	7
Lindenwood *	2	–	3	7	–	3
Eastern Illinois	1	–	4	2	–	9
Murray State	1	–	4	2	–	9
+ – Conference co-champions; ^ – FCS playoff participant; Note: Lindenwood ineligible for OVC title and FCS postseason play due to transition from NCAA Division II.; Rankings from STATS Poll

2022 Patriot League football standings
	Conf.			Overall
Team	W		L	W		L
No. 6 Holy Cross $^	6	–	0	12	–	1
No. 22 Fordham ^	5	–	1	9	–	3
Lafayette	3	–	3	4	–	7
Bucknell	2	–	4	3	–	8
Colgate	2	–	4	3	–	8
Lehigh	2	–	4	2	–	9
Georgetown	1	–	5	2	–	9
$ – Conference champion; ^ – FCS playoff participant; Rankings from STATS Poll

2022 Pioneer Football League standings
	Conf.			Overall
Team	W		L	W		L
St. Thomas (MN) * $	8	–	0	10	–	1
Dayton	6	–	2	8	–	3
Davidson ^	6	–	2	8	–	4
Butler	5	–	3	7	–	4
San Diego	4	–	3	5	–	5
Valparaiso	4	–	4	5	–	7
Marist	4	–	4	4	–	7
Drake	3	–	5	3	–	8
Stetson	2	–	5	4	–	6
Morehead State	1	–	7	2	–	9
Presbyterian	0	–	8	1	–	10
$ – Conference champion; ^ – FCS playoff participant; * – St. Thomas (MN) ineligible for FCS postseason play due to transition from NCAA Division III; Rankings from STATS Poll

2022 Southern Conference football standings
	Conf.			Overall
Team	W		L	W		L
No. 7 Samford $^	8	–	0	11	–	2
No. 10 Furman ^	7	–	1	10	–	3
No. 23 Chattanooga	5	–	3	7	–	4
No. 24 Mercer	5	–	3	7	–	4
Western Carolina	4	–	4	6	–	5
Wofford	3	–	5	3	–	8
The Citadel	3	–	5	4	–	7
East Tennessee State	1	–	7	3	–	8
VMI	0	–	8	1	–	10
$ – Conference champion; ^ – FCS playoff participant; Rankings from STATS Poll

2022 Southland Conference football standings
	Conf.			Overall
Team	W		L	W		L
No. 12 Southeastern Louisiana +^	5	–	1	9	–	4
No. 3 Incarnate Word +^	5	–	1	12	–	2
Northwestern State	4	–	2	4	–	7
Nicholls	3	–	3	3	–	8
Texas A&M–Commerce *	3	–	3	5	–	6
McNeese	2	–	4	4	–	7
Houston Christian	1	–	5	2	–	9
Lamar	1	–	5	1	–	10
+ – Conference co-champions; ^ – FCS playoff participant; * – Texas A&M–Commerce ineligible for FCS postseason play due to transition from NCAA Division II; Rankings from STATS Poll

2022 Southwestern Athletic Conference football standings
	Conf.			Overall
Team	W		L	W		L
East Division
No. 16 Jackson State xy$	8	–	0	12	–	1
Florida A&M	7	–	1	9	–	2
Alabama State	4	–	4	6	–	5
Alabama A&M	4	–	4	4	–	7
Bethune–Cookman	2	–	6	2	–	9
Mississippi Valley State	2	–	6	2	–	9
West Division
Southern xy	5	–	3	7	–	5
Prairie View A&M x	5	–	3	6	–	5
Alcorn State	4	–	4	5	–	6
Texas Southern	4	–	4	5	–	6
Grambling State	2	–	6	3	–	8
Arkansas–Pine Bluff	1	–	7	3	–	8
Championship: Jackson State 43, Southern 24
$ – Conference champion; x – Division champion/co-champions; y – Championship game participant; Rankings from STATS Poll

2022 WAC–ASUN Challenge football standings
	Conf.			Overall
Team	W		L	W		L
Eastern Kentucky $^	4	–	1	7	–	5
Central Arkansas	4	–	1	5	–	6
Austin Peay	3	–	1	7	–	4
Stephen F. Austin	2	–	1	6	–	5
Abilene Christian	1	–	1	7	–	4
Kennesaw State	1	–	3	5	–	6
Southern Utah	0	–	3	5	–	6
North Alabama	0	–	4	1	–	10
$ – Conference champion; ^ – FCS playoff participant; Rankings from STATS Poll

2022 Western Athletic Conference football standings
	Conf.			Overall
Team	W		L	W		L
Stephen F. Austin +	3	–	1	6	–	5
Abilene Christian +	3	–	1	7	–	4
Sam Houston *	3	–	2	5	–	4
Utah Tech *	2	–	2	4	–	7
Tarleton State *	1	–	3	6	–	5
Southern Utah	1	–	3	5	–	6
+ – Conference co-champions; * Note: Sam Houston ineligible for WAC championship and FCS postseason play due to start of transition to FBS; Tarleton and Utah Tech ineligible for FCS postseason play due to transition from NCAA Division II.; Rankings from STATS Poll

== Playoff qualifiers ==
=== Automatic berths for conference champions ===
Conference	Team	Appearance	Last bid	Result of last appearance
Big Sky Conference	Sacramento State	3rd	2021	Second Round (L - South Dakota State)
Big South Conference	Gardner–Webb	1st	None	None
Colonial Athletic Association	William & Mary	11th	2015	Second Round (L - Richmond)
Missouri Valley Football Conference	South Dakota State	12th	2021	Semifinals (L – Montana State)
Northeast Conference	Saint Francis (PA)	2nd	2016	First Round (L – Villanova)
Ohio Valley Conference	Southeast Missouri State	4th	2019	First Round (L - Illinois State)
Patriot League	Holy Cross	5th	2021	Second Round (L – Villanova)
Pioneer Football League	Davidson	3rd	2021	First Round (L – Kennesaw State)
Southern Conference	Samford	6th	2017	First Round (L – Kennesaw State)
Southland Conference	Southeastern Louisiana	5th	2021	Second Round (L – James Madison)
ASUN Conference-Western Athletic Conference	Eastern Kentucky	22nd	2014	First Round (L - Indiana State)

=== At large qualifiers ===
Conference	Team	Appearance	Last bid	Result of last appearance
Big Sky Conference	Montana State	12th	2021	Championship Game (L - North Dakota State)
Big Sky Conference	Weber State	10th	2020	First Round (L - Southern Illinois)
Big Sky Conference	Idaho	12th	1995	First Round (L - McNeese State)
Big Sky Conference	Montana	26th	2021	Quarterfinals (L - James Madison)
Colonial Athletic Association	New Hampshire	17th	2017	Quarterfinals (L - South Dakota State)
Colonial Athletic Association	Elon	4th	2018	First Round (L - Wofford)
Colonial Athletic Association	Richmond	12th	2016	Quarterfinals (L - Eastern Washington)
Colonial Athletic Association	Delaware	18th	2020	Semifinals (L - South Dakota State)
Missouri Valley Football Conference	North Dakota State	13th	2021	National champions (W - Montana State)
Missouri Valley Football Conference	North Dakota	4th	2020	Quarterfinals (L - James Madison)
Patriot League	Fordham	6th	2015	First Round (L - Chattanooga)
Southern Conference	Furman	19th	2019	First Round (L - Austin Peay)
Southland Conference	Incarnate Word	3rd	2021	Second Round (L - Sam Houston State)

=== Abstentions ===
- Ivy League – Yale
- Mid-Eastern Athletic Conference – North Carolina Central
- Southwestern Athletic Conference – Jackson State

== Postseason ==
The FCS again featured a 24-team postseason bracket: 11 teams decided via automatic bids issued to conference champions, and 13 at-large bids; the top eight teams were seeded.

=== Bowl game ===
Date	Time (EST)	Game	Site	Television	Participants	Affiliations	Results
Dec. 17	12:00 p.m.	Celebration Bowl	Mercedes-Benz Stadium; Atlanta, Georgia	ABC	North Carolina Central Eagles (9–2); Jackson State Tigers (12–0)	MEAC; SWAC	North Carolina Central 41; Jackson State 34 (OT)

=== NCAA Division I playoff bracket ===
First Round; November 26; Campus sites
Saint Francis (PA)	17
Delaware	56
Fordham	42
New Hampshire	52
Gardner–Webb	52
Eastern Kentucky	41
North Dakota	31
Weber State	38
Southeast Missouri State	24
Montana	34
Idaho	42
Southeastern Louisiana	45
Elon	6
Furman	31
Davidson	0
Richmond	41

Second Round; December 3 Campus sites
1	South Dakota State	42
Delaware	6
8	Holy Cross	35
New Hampshire	19
5	William & Mary	54
Gardner–Webb	14
4	Montana State	33
Weber State	25
3	North Dakota State	49
Montana	26
6	Samford	48
Southeastern Louisiana	42
7	Incarnate Word	41
Furman	38
2	Sacramento State	38
Richmond	31

Quarterfinals; December 9/10; Campus sites
1	South Dakota State	42
8	Holy Cross	21
5	William & Mary	7
4	Montana State	55
3	North Dakota State	27
6	Samford	9
7	Incarnate Word	66
2	Sacramento State	63

Semifinals; December 16/17; Campus sites
1	South Dakota State	39
4	Montana State	18
3	North Dakota State	35
7	Incarnate Word	32

National Championship; January 8; 2 p.m. EST; Toyota Stadium, Frisco, Texas; ABC, ESPN+
1	South Dakota State	45
3	North Dakota State	21

== Rankings ==
The top 25 from the STATS and USA Today Coaches Polls.

=== Pre-season polls ===
STATS
Ranking	Team
1	North Dakota State (52)
2	South Dakota State (2)
3	Montana
4	Montana State
5	Missouri State
6	Villanova
7	Sacramento State
8	Kennesaw State
9	Southern Illinois
10	Stephen F. Austin
11	East Tennessee State
12	Chattanooga
13	Eastern Washington
14	Incarnate Word
15	Jackson State
16	Holy Cross
17	Southeastern Louisiana
18	UT Martin
19	Delaware
20	Weber State
21	Northern Iowa
22	Rhode Island
23	Mercer
24	Richmond
25	UC Davis

USA Today Coaches
Ranking	Team
1	North Dakota State (24)
2	Montana
3	South Dakota State (1)
4	Montana State
5	Villanova
6	Kennesaw State
7	Sacramento State
8	Missouri State
9	Southern Illinois
10	Stephen F. Austin
11	East Tennessee State
12	Eastern Washington
13	Chattanooga
14	Incarnate Word
15	UT Martin
16	Southeastern Louisiana
17	Jackson State
18	Holy Cross
19	Delaware
20	Weber State
21	Northern Iowa
22	UC Davis
23	Mercer
24	Rhode Island т Richmond т

=== Final rankings ===
Rank	Stats Perform	Coaches' Poll
1	South Dakota State (14–1) (54)	South Dakota State (14–1) (26)
2	North Dakota State (12–3)	North Dakota State (12–3)
3	Incarnate Word (12–2)	Incarnate Word (12–2)
4	Montana State (12–2)	Sacramento State (12–1)
5	Sacramento State (12–1)	Montana State (12–2)
6	Holy Cross (12–1)	Holy Cross (12–1)
7	Samford (11–2)	Samford (11–2)
8	William & Mary (11–2)	William & Mary (11–2)
9	Weber State (10–3)	Weber State (10–3)
10	Furman (10–3)	Furman (10–3)
11	Richmond (9–4)	Jackson State (12–1)
12	Southeastern Louisiana (9–4)	Richmond (9–4)
13	New Hampshire (9–4)	Southeast Missouri State (9–3)
14	Montana (8–5)	Montana (8–5)
15	Southeast Missouri State (9–3)	New Hampshire (9–4)
16	Jackson State (12–1)	Fordham (9–3)
17	Elon (8–4)	North Carolina Central (10–2)
18	Idaho (7–5)	Elon (8–4)
19	Delaware (8–5)	Southeastern Louisiana (9–4)
20	North Dakota (7–5)	St. Thomas (MN)
21	North Carolina Central (10–2)	Mercer (7–4)
22	Fordham (9–3)	Idaho (7–5)
23	Chattanooga (7–4)	Florida A&M (9–2)
24	Mercer (7–4)	Delaware (8–5) т Chattanooga (7–4) т
25	UC Davis (6–5)	

== Kickoff games ==
The regular season began on Saturday, August 27 with seven games in Week 0:

- FCS Kickoff (Cramton Bowl, Montgomery, Alabama): Jacksonville State 42, No. 10 Stephen F. Austin 17
- MEAC/SWAC Challenge (Center Parc Stadium, Atlanta): Alabama State 23, Howard 13
- Florida State 47 (FBS), Duquesne 7
- North Carolina 56 (FBS), Florida A&M 24
- Western Kentucky 38, Austin Peay 27
- UNLV 52 (FBS), Idaho State 21
- No. 23 Mercer 63, Morehead State 13

== Regular season top 10 matchups ==
Rankings reflect the STATS Poll.

- Week 4
  - No. 2т South Dakota State defeated No. 6 Missouri State, 28–14 (Robert W. Plaster Stadium, Springfield, MO)
- Week 7
  - No. 2 South Dakota State defeated No. 1 North Dakota State, 23–21 (Fargodome, Fargo, ND)
- Week 8
  - No. 2 Sacramento State defeated No. 7 Montana, 31–24 ^{OT} (Hornet Stadium, Sacramento, CA)
  - No. 3 Montana State defeated No. 5 Weber State, 43–38 (Bobcat Stadium, Bozeman, MT)
- Week 10
  - No. 2 Sacramento State defeated No. 5 Weber State, 33–30 (Stewart Stadium, Ogden, UT)

== Upsets ==
This section lists instances of unranked teams defeating ranked teams during the season.

During the regular season, 13 unranked teams defeated a ranked team.

- August 27, 2022
  - Jacksonville State 42, No. 10 Stephen F. Austin 17 (FCS Kickoff)
- September 1
  - Samford 27, No. 8 Kennesaw State 17
- September 10
  - The Citadel 20, No. 9 East Tennessee State 17
  - Southeast Missouri State 34, No. 17 Southern Illinois 31
  - North Dakota 29, No. 24 Northern Iowa 27
- September 17
  - North Carolina Central 45, No. 25 New Hampshire 27
  - Furman 27, No. 18 East Tennessee State 14
- September 24
  - Monmouth 49, No. 9 Villanova 42
  - Elon 35, No. 14 William & Mary 31
  - Austin Peay 31, No. 16 Eastern Kentucky 20
  - Southeastern Louisiana 41, No. 4т Incarnate Word 35
- October 1
  - North Dakota 48, No. 7 Missouri State 31
  - Central Arkansas 49, No. 22 Austin Peay 20
- October 8
  - Texas A&M–Commerce 31, No 19. Southeastern Louisiana 28
- October 15
  - Idaho 30, No. 2 Montana 23
  - Sam Houston State 25, No. 23 Eastern Kentucky 17
- October 22
  - South Dakota 27, No. 14 Southern Illinois 24
- October 29
  - Elon 27, No. 12 Delaware 7
  - Eastern Kentucky 28, No. 15 Southeast Missouri State 23
  - Northern Iowa 37, No. 20 Southern Illinois 36
  - Jacksonville State 40, No. 25 Austin Peay 16
- November 5
  - Kennesaw State 44, No. 15 UT Martin 27
- November 12
  - UC Davis 44, No. 15 Idaho 26
  - Yale 24, No. 24 Princeton 20
- November 19
  - Western Carolina 32, No. 15 Chattanooga 29
  - Villanova 29, No. 20 Delaware 26

== Coaching changes ==
=== Preseason and in-season ===
This is restricted to coaching changes that took place on or after May 1, 2022, and will include any changes announced after a team's last regularly scheduled games but before its playoff games. For coaching changes that occurred earlier in 2022, see 2021 NCAA Division I FCS end-of-season coaching changes.

School	Outgoing coach	Date	Reason	Replacement
Wofford	Josh Conklin	October 6, 2022	Resigned (effective immediately)	Shawn Watson (named full time on December 1)
Arkansas–Pine Bluff	Doc Gamble	October 20, 2022	Fired	Don Treadwell (interim)
North Alabama	Chris Willis	October 30, 2022	Fired	Ryan Held (interim)

=== End of season ===
This list includes coaching changes announced during the season that did not take effect until the end of the season.

School	Outgoing coach	Date	Reason	Replacement	Previous position
Charleston Southern	Autry Denson	November 14, 2022	Fired	Gabe Giardina	Albany State head coach (2018–2022)
VMI	Scott Wachenheim	November 20, 2022	Resigned	Danny Rocco	Delaware head coach (2017–2021)
Northern Colorado	Ed McCaffrey	November 21, 2022	Fired	Ed Lamb	BYU associate head coach/ST coordinator/safeties coach (2016–2022)
Houston Christian	Vic Shealy	November 21, 2022	Resigned	Braxton Harris	Campbell associate head coach/linebackers/recruiting coordinator (2021–2022)
Lamar	Blane Morgan	November 21, 2022	Fired	Peter Rossomando	Charlotte interim head coach (2022)
Towson	Rob Ambrose	November 21, 2022	Fired	Pete Shinnick	West Florida head coach (2014–2022)
The Citadel	Brent Thompson	November 21, 2022	Fired	Maurice Drayton	Las Vegas Raiders assistant special teams coach (2022)
Lehigh	Tom Gilmore	November 21, 2022	Resigned	Kevin Cahill	Yale associate head coach/OC/QB coach (2018–2022)
Texas A&M–Commerce	David Bailiff	November 22, 2022	Contract expired	Clint Dolezel	Frisco Fighters head coach (2020–2021)
Idaho State	Charlie Ragle	November 28, 2022	Became ST Coordinator at Arizona State	Cody Hawkins	UC Davis OC/QB coach (2017–2022)
Delaware State	Rod Milstead	November 28, 2022	Fired	Lee Hull	Howard OC/QB coach (2020–2022)
Dayton	Rick Chamberlin	November 29, 2022	Retired	Trevor Andrews	Western Michigan linebackers coach (2019–2022)
Bethune–Cookman	Terry Sims	November 29, 2022	Fired	Raymond Woodie	Florida Atlantic associate head coach/OLB coach/ST coordinator/recruiting coordinator (2020–22)
Central Connecticut	Ryan McCarthy	November 30, 2022	Contract not renewed	Adam Lechtenberg	Central Oklahoma assistant head coach/co-OC/QB coach (2022)
UIW	G. J. Kinne	December 2, 2022	Became head coach at Texas State	Clint Killough	UIW associate head coach/WR coach/recruiting coordinator (2022)
Cal Poly	Beau Baldwin	December 2, 2022	Became OC at Arizona State	Paul Wulff	Cal Poly associate head coach/OL coach (2020–2022)
North Alabama	Ryan Held (interim)	December 3, 2022	Permanent replacement	Brent Dearmon	Florida Atlantic OC/QB coach (2022)
Jackson State	Deion Sanders	December 4, 2022	Became head coach at Colorado	T. C. Taylor	Jackson State OC/WR coach (2019–2022)
Weber State	Jay Hill	December 7, 2022	Became DC at BYU	Mickey Mental	Weber State offensive coordinator (2022)
Mississippi Valley State	Vincent Dancy	December 8, 2022	Became defensive assistant at Colorado	Kendrick Wade	Delta State pass game coordinator/WR coach (2022)
Sacramento State	Troy Taylor	December 10, 2022	Became head coach at Stanford	Andy Thompson	Sacramento State defensive coordinator (2019–2022)
Missouri State	Bobby Petrino	December 15, 2022	Became OC at UNLV	Ryan Beard	Missouri State defensive coordinator and safeties coach (2020–2022)
North Carolina A&T	Sam Washington	December 15, 2022	Fired	Vincent Brown	William & Mary Assistant head coach/defensive coordinator/linebackers coach (2019–2022)
Arkansas–Pine Bluff	Don Treadwell (interim)	December 22, 2022	Permanent replacement	Alonzo Hampton	Louisiana–Monroe associate head coach/ST coordinator/safeties coach (2021–2022)
South Dakota State	John Stiegelmeier	January 20, 2023	Retired	Jimmy Rogers	South Dakota State associate head coach/Defensive coordinator/LB coach (2019–2022)
San Diego	Dale Lindsey	March 21, 2023	Retired	Brandon Moore	Colorado Mines head coach (2022)

== Rule changes ==
The following rule changes were recommended by the NCAA Football Rules Committee for the 2022 season:

- When players are disqualified for a targeting call in the second half or in overtime (which requires a carryover penalty of sitting out the first half of the next scheduled game), an appeals process will be available to allow the National Coordinator of Officials (currently Steve Shaw) to review tapes of the targeting penalty for consideration of not requiring the player to sit out the first half of the following game.
- Injury timeouts awarded due to "deceptive actions" during a game will also be able to reviewed by the National Coordinator of Officials to determine what sanctions, if any, against teams who use this tactic, enforced at the conference or school level.
- Blocking below the waist will only be permitted inside the tackle box by linemen and stationary backs. Blocks below the waist outside of the tackle box are not allowed.
- Defensive holding will remain a 10-yard penalty but will always carry an automatic first down.
- Codifying the rule change made shortly after the 2021 ACC Championship Game, ball carriers who simulate a feet-first slide will be declared down at that spot.
- Uniform rules would require the sock/leg covering to go from the shoe to the bottom of the pants, similar to the NFL rule.

== See also ==
- 2022 NCAA Division I FBS football season
- 2022 NCAA Division II football season
- 2022 NCAA Division III football season
- 2022 NAIA football season
- 2022 U Sports football season
- 2022 junior college football season
