= 2022 Samford Bulldogs football team =

American college football season

2022 Samford Bulldogs football

SoCon champion

FCS Playoffs Quarterfinal, L 9–27 vs. North Dakota State
- Conference: Southern Conference

Ranking
- STATS: No. 7
- FCS Coaches: No. 7
- Record: 11–2 (8–0 SoCon)
- Head coach: Chris Hatcher (8th season)
- Offensive coordinator: Ricky Turner (1st season)
- Offensive scheme: Spread
- Defensive coordinator: Chris Boone (1st season)
- Base defense: 4–3
- Home stadium: Seibert Stadium

2022 Southern Conference football standings
	Conf.			Overall
Team	W		L	W		L
No. 7 Samford $^	8	–	0	11	–	2
No. 10 Furman ^	7	–	1	10	–	3
No. 23 Chattanooga	5	–	3	7	–	4
No. 24 Mercer	5	–	3	7	–	4
Western Carolina	4	–	4	6	–	5
Wofford	3	–	5	3	–	8
The Citadel	3	–	5	4	–	7
East Tennessee State	1	–	7	3	–	8
VMI	0	–	8	1	–	10
$ – Conference champion; ^ – FCS playoff participant; Rankings from STATS Poll

The 2022 Samford Bulldogs football team represented Samford University as a member of the Southern Conference (SoCon) during the 2022 NCAA Division I FCS football season. The Bulldogs were led by eighth-year head coach Chris Hatcher and played their home games at Seibert Stadium in Homewood, Alabama.

== Schedule ==
Date	Time	Opponent	Rank	Site	TV	Result	Attendance
September 1	6:00 p.m.	No. 8 Kennesaw State*		Seibert Stadium; Homewood, AL	ESPN+	W 27–17	5,333
September 10	3:00 p.m.	at No. 2 (FBS) Georgia*	No. 25	Sanford Stadium; Athens, GA	SECN	L 0–33	92,746
September 17	6:00 p.m.	at Tennessee Tech*	No. 24	Tucker Stadium; Cookeville, TN	ESPN+	W 33–28	9,249
September 24	2:00 p.m.	Western Carolina	No. 21	Seibert Stadium; Homewood, AL	ESPN+	W 35–12	7,519
October 1	1:00 p.m.	at Furman	No. 16	Paladin Stadium; Greenville, SC	ESPN+	W 34–27	9,507
October 8	12:00 p.m.	Wofford	No. 13	Seibert Stadium; Homewood, AL	ESPN+	W 28–14	3,513
October 22	2:30 p.m.	at East Tennessee State	No. 15	William B. Greene Jr. Stadium; Johnson City, TN	ESPN3	W 55–45	10,327
October 29	1:00 p.m.	at The Citadel	No. 13	Johnson Hagood Stadium; Charleston, SC	ESPN+	W 38–3	8,603
November 5	2:00 p.m.	VMI^{†}	No. 10	Seibert Stadium; Homewood, AL	ESPN+	W 34–15	5,375
November 12	12:30 p.m.	at No. 11 Chattanooga	No. 10	Finley Stadium; Chattanooga, TN	ESPN+	W 35–24	7,128
November 19	12:00 p.m.	No. 19 Mercer	No. 9	Seibert Stadium; Homewood, AL	ESPN+	W 50–44 ^{2OT}	6,033
December 3	3:00 p.m.	No. 17 Southeastern Louisiana*	No. 8	Seibert Stadium; Homewood, AL (NCAA Division I Second Round)	ESPN+	W 48–42 ^{OT}	4,587
December 9	6:00 p.m.	at No. 4 North Dakota State*	No. 8	Fargodome; Fargo, ND (NCAA Division I Quarterfinal)	ESPN2/ESPN+	L 9–27	11,825
*Non-conference game; ^{†}Homecoming; Rankings from STATS Poll released prior to the game; All times are in Central time

== Game summaries ==
=== No. 8 Kennesaw State ===
	1	2	3	4	Total
No. 8 Owls	7	0	10	0	17
Bulldogs	0	14	0	13	27

=== At No. 2 (FBS) Georgia ===
Game Two – No. 2 (FBS) Georgia Bulldogs (1–0) vs. No. 25 Samford Bulldogs (1–0)

Quarter	1	2	3	4	Total
No. 25 Samford	0	0	0	0	0
No. 2 (FBS) Georgia	13	17	0	3	33

at Sanford Stadium • Athens, Georgia

- Date: Saturday, September 10, 2022
- Game time: 3:00 p.m. CST
- Game weather: Clear • Temperature: - • Wind:
- Game attendance: 92,746
- Referee: Wayne Winkler
- TV announcers (SEC Network): Taylor Zarzour (play-by-play), Matt Stinchcomb (color) and Alyssa Lang (sideline)

Game information

First quarter

- (7:51) UGA – Jack Podlesny 27 Yd Field Goal (Georgia 3–0)
- (5:34) UGA – Jack Podlesny 25 Yd Field Goal (Georgia 6–0)
- (14:55) UGA – Stetson Bennett 3 Yd Run (Jack Podlesny Kick) (Georgia 13–0)

Second quarter

- (8:48) UGA – Dillon Bell 3 Yd pass from Stetson Bennett (Jack Podlesny Kick) (Georgia 20–0)
- (5:01) UGA – Jack Podlesny 26 Yd Field Goal (Georgia 23–0)
- (0:55) UGA – Kenny McIntosh 1 Yd Run (Jack Podlesny Kick) (Georgia 30–0)

Third quarter

no scoring

Fourth quarter

- (11:11) UGA – Jack Podlesny 25 Yd Field Goal (Georgia 33–0)

Statistics	SAM	UGA
First downs	3	25
Plays–yards	43–128	75–479
Rushes–yards	19	127
Passing yards	109	352
Passing: comp–att–int	16–26-0	29–43–0
Time of possession	19:57	40:03

Team	Category	Player	Statistics
Samford	Passing	Michael Hiers	13/21, 62 yards
Samford	Rushing	Jay Stanton	5 carries, 12 yards
Samford	Receiving	Ty King	4 receptions, 52 yards
Georgia	Passing	Stetson Bennett	24/34, 300 yards, 1 TD
Georgia	Rushing	Kendall Milton	10 carry, 85 yards
Georgia	Receiving	Kenny McIntosh	5 receptions, 61 yards

=== At Tennessee Tech ===
	1	2	3	4	Total
No. 24 Bulldogs	10	7	7	9	33
Golden Eagles	14	7	0	7	28

=== Western Carolina ===
	1	2	3	4	Total
Catamounts	0	3	6	3	12
No. 21 Bulldogs	7	7	7	14	35

=== At Furman ===
	1	2	3	4	Total
No. 16 Bulldogs	0	20	14	0	34
Paladins	10	7	0	10	27

=== Wofford ===
	1	2	3	4	Total
Terriers	0	0	7	7	14
No. 13 Bulldogs	7	7	14	0	28

=== At East Tennessee State ===
	1	2	3	4	Total
No. 15 Bulldogs	10	24	14	7	55
Buccaneers	10	14	7	14	45

=== At The Citadel ===
	1	2	3	4	Total
No. 13 Samford Bulldogs	7	14	10	7	38
Citadel Bulldogs	0	3	0	0	3

=== VMI ===
	1	2	3	4	Total
Keydets	6	6	3	0	15
No. 10 Bulldogs	0	7	13	14	34

=== At No. 11 Chattanooga ===
	1	2	3	4	Total
No. 10 Bulldogs	7	21	7	0	35
No. 11 Mocs	7	3	14	0	24

=== No. 19 Mercer ===
	1	2	3	4	OT	2OT	Total
No. 19 Bears	17	0	3	17	7	0	44
No. 9 Bulldogs	14	6	7	10	7	6	50

== FCS Playoffs ==
=== No. 17 Southeastern Louisiana – second round ===
Southeastern Louisiana Lions at Samford Bulldogs

Quarter	1	2	3	4	OT	Total
No. 17 Lions	14	0	14	14	0	42
No. 8 Bulldogs	14	7	7	14	6	48

at Seibert Stadium, Homewood, AL

- Date: December 3
- Game time: 2:00 p.m.
- Game weather: Cloudy
- Game attendance: 4,587
- Referee: Jeremy DeAngulo
- TV: ESPN+

=== At No. 4 North Dakota State – Quarterfinals ===
Samford Bulldogs (11–1) vs. North Dakota State Bison (10–2)

Quarter	1	2	3	4	Total
No. 8 (6) Bulldogs	0	0	0	9	9
No. 4 (3) Bison	0	10	14	3	27

at Fargodome, Fargo, ND

- Date: December 9, 2022
- Game time: 6:00 p.m. (CT)
- Game weather: Indoors; 70 °F (21 °C)
- Game attendance: 11,825
- Referee: Reed Brotherton
- TV announcers (ESPN2): Tiffany Greene, Jay Walker, Taylor Davis

Statistics	Samford	North Dakota State
First downs	19	21
Plays–yards	71–336	66–360
Rushes–yards	24–57	48–166
Passing yards	279	194
Passing: comp–att–int	30–47–1	15–18–0
Time of possession	20:55	39:05

Team	Category	Player	Statistics
Samford	Passing	Michael Hiers	22/30, 227 yds, TD, INT
Samford	Rushing	Jay Stanton	10 car, 39 yds
Samford	Receiving	Chandler Smith	6 rec, 120 yds, TD
North Dakota State	Passing	Cam Miller	15/18, 194 yds, TD
North Dakota State	Rushing	Kobe Johnson	15 car, 48 yds
North Dakota State	Receiving	Joe Stoffel	3 rec, 60 yds, TD

Scoring summary

Quarter	Time	Drive			Team	Scoring information	Score	
Quarter	Time	Plays	Yards	TOP	Team	Scoring information	SAM	NDSU
2nd	1:25	12	69	7:28	NDSU	Joe Stoffel (#82) 2-yard touchdown reception from Cam Miller (#7), Griffin Crosa (#39) kick good	0	7
2nd	0:00	3	24	0:25	NDSU	44-yard field goal by Griffin Crosa (#39)	0	10
3rd	10:57	7	82	3:59	NDSU	TK Marshall (#28) 7-yard touchdown run, Griffin Crosa (#39) kick good	0	17
3rd	2:02	12	63	7:15	NDSU	Cam Miller (#7) 1-yard touchdown run, Griffin Crosa (#39) kick good	0	24
4th	12:08	12	66	4:48	SAM	28-yard field goal by Zach Williams (#59)	3	24
4th	6:04	9	71	6:04	NDSU	22-yard field goal by Griffin Crosa (#39)	3	27
4th	3:53	8	75	2:11	SAM	Chandler Smith (#0) 40-yard touchdown reception from Michael Hiers (#10), 2-point pass incomplete	9	27
"TOP" = time of possession. For other American football terms, see Glossary of American football.							9	27
