= 2022 Chattanooga Mocs football team =

American college football season

2022 Chattanooga Mocs football
- Conference: Southern Conference

Ranking
- STATS: No. 23
- FCS Coaches: No. 24 (tie)
- Record: 7–4 (5–3 SoCon)
- Head coach: Rusty Wright (4th season)
- Offensive coordinator: Joe Pizzo (4th season)
- Defensive coordinator: Lorenzo Ward (4th season)
- Home stadium: Finley Stadium

2022 Southern Conference football standings
| | Conf. | | | Overall |
| Team | W | | L | W | | L |
|---|---|---|---|---|---|---|
| No. 7 Samford $^ | 8 | – | 0 | 11 | – | 2 |
| No. 10 Furman ^ | 7 | – | 1 | 10 | – | 3 |
| No. 23 Chattanooga | 5 | – | 3 | 7 | – | 4 |
| No. 24 Mercer | 5 | – | 3 | 7 | – | 4 |
| Western Carolina | 4 | – | 4 | 6 | – | 5 |
| Wofford | 3 | – | 5 | 3 | – | 8 |
| The Citadel | 3 | – | 5 | 4 | – | 7 |
| East Tennessee State | 1 | – | 7 | 3 | – | 8 |
| VMI | 0 | – | 8 | 1 | – | 10 |
$ – Conference champion; ^ – FCS playoff participant; Rankings from STATS Poll

The 2022 Chattanooga Mocs football team represented the University of Tennessee at Chattanooga as a member of the Southern Conference (SoCon) during the 2022 NCAA Division I FCS football season. The Mocs were led by third-year head coach Rusty Wright and played their home games at Finley Stadium in Chattanooga, Tennessee.

== Schedule ==
| Date | Time | Opponent | Rank | Site | TV | Result | Attendance |
|---|---|---|---|---|---|---|---|
| September 3 | 6:00 p.m. | Wofford | No. 12 | Finley Stadium; Chattanooga, TN | | W 31–0 | 7,123 |
| September 10 | 7:00 p.m. | at Eastern Illinois* | No. 11 | O'Brien Field; Charleston, IL | ESPN+ | W 38–20 | 6,565 |
| September 17 | 6:00 p.m. | North Alabama*^{†} | No. 10 | Finley Stadium; Chattanooga, TN | | W 41–14 | 10,254 |
| September 24 | 8:30 p.m. | at Illinois* | No. 10 | Memorial Stadium; Champaign, IL | BTN | L 0–31 | 37,579 |
| October 1 | 3:00 p.m. | at East Tennessee State | No. 12 | William B. Greene Jr. Stadium; Johnson City, TN | ESPN+ | W 24–16 | 10,247 |
| October 15 | 1:30 p.m. | VMI | No. 10 | Finley Stadium; Chattanooga, TN | ESPN3 | W 41–13 | 6,284 |
| October 22 | 1:30 p.m. | No. 11 Mercer | No. 10 | Finley Stadium; Chattanooga, TN | ESPN+ | W 41–21 | 9,092 |
| October 29 | 2:00 p.m. | at No. 24 Furman | No. 7 | Paladin Stadium; Greenville, SC | ESPN3 | L 20–24 | 9,724 |
| November 5 | 2:00 p.m. | at The Citadel | No. 11 | Johnson Hagood Stadium; Charleston, SC | ESPN+ | W 31–21 | 12,106 |
| November 12 | 1:30 p.m. | No. 10 Samford | No. 11 | Finley Stadium; Chattanooga, TN | ESPN+ | L 24–35 | 7,128 |
| November 19 | 1:00 p.m. | at Western Carolina | No. 15 | Bob Waters Field at E. J. Whitmire Stadium; Cullowhee, NC | ESPN+ | L 29–32 | 9,089 |
*Non-conference game; ^{†}Homecoming; Rankings from STATS Poll released prior to the game; All times are in Eastern time

== Game summaries ==
=== Wofford ===
| | 1 | 2 | 3 | 4 | Total |
|---|---|---|---|---|---|
| Terriers | 0 | 0 | 0 | 0 | 0 |
| No. 12 Mocs | 10 | 14 | 7 | 0 | 31 |

=== At Eastern Illinois ===
| | 1 | 2 | 3 | 4 | Total |
|---|---|---|---|---|---|
| No. 11 Mocs | 7 | 7 | 14 | 10 | 38 |
| Panthers | 10 | 0 | 10 | 0 | 20 |

=== North Alabama ===
| | 1 | 2 | 3 | 4 | Total |
|---|---|---|---|---|---|
| Lions | 0 | 14 | 0 | 0 | 14 |
| No. 10 Mocs | 7 | 20 | 0 | 14 | 41 |

=== At Illinois ===
| | 1 | 2 | 3 | 4 | Total |
|---|---|---|---|---|---|
| No. 10 Mocs | 0 | 0 | 0 | 0 | 0 |
| Fighting Illini | 10 | 14 | 7 | 0 | 31 |

=== At East Tennessee State ===
| | 1 | 2 | 3 | 4 | Total |
|---|---|---|---|---|---|
| No. 12 Mocs | 0 | 0 | 3 | 21 | 24 |
| Buccaneers | 10 | 3 | 0 | 3 | 16 |

=== VMI ===
| | 1 | 2 | 3 | 4 | Total |
|---|---|---|---|---|---|
| Keydets | 7 | 0 | 6 | 0 | 13 |
| No. 10 Mocs | 21 | 10 | 0 | 10 | 41 |

=== No. 11 Mercer ===
| | 1 | 2 | 3 | 4 | Total |
|---|---|---|---|---|---|
| No. 11 Bears | 0 | 14 | 7 | 0 | 21 |
| No. 10 Mocs | 17 | 10 | 7 | 7 | 41 |

=== At No. 24 Furman ===
| | 1 | 2 | 3 | 4 | Total |
|---|---|---|---|---|---|
| No. 7 Mocs | 3 | 7 | 3 | 7 | 20 |
| No. 24 Paladins | 7 | 10 | 7 | 0 | 24 |

=== At The Citadel ===
| | 1 | 2 | 3 | 4 | Total |
|---|---|---|---|---|---|
| No. 11 Mocs | 3 | 7 | 14 | 7 | 31 |
| Citadel Bulldogs | 7 | 0 | 0 | 14 | 21 |

=== No. 10 Samford ===
| | 1 | 2 | 3 | 4 | Total |
|---|---|---|---|---|---|
| No. 10 Samford Bulldogs | 7 | 21 | 7 | 0 | 35 |
| No. 11 Mocs | 7 | 3 | 14 | 0 | 24 |

=== At Western Carolina ===
| | 1 | 2 | 3 | 4 | Total |
|---|---|---|---|---|---|
| No. 15 Mocs | 7 | 7 | 9 | 6 | 29 |
| Catamounts | 7 | 7 | 7 | 11 | 32 |
