= 2022 Idaho Vandals football team =

American college football season

2022 Idaho Vandals football

FCS First Round, L 42–45 at Southeastern Louisiana
- Conference: Big Sky

Ranking
- STATS: No. 18
- FCS Coaches: No. 22
- Record: 7–5 (6–2 Big Sky)
- Head coach: Jason Eck (1st season)
- Offensive coordinator: Luke Schleusner (1st season)
- Offensive scheme: Spread option
- Defensive coordinator: Rob Aurich (1st season)
- Base defense: 3–4
- Home stadium: Kibbie Dome

2022 Big Sky Conference football standings
| | Conf. | | | Overall |
| Team | W | | L | W | | L |
|---|---|---|---|---|---|---|
| No. 4 Montana State +^ | 8 | – | 0 | 12 | – | 2 |
| No. 5 Sacramento State +^ | 8 | – | 0 | 12 | – | 1 |
| No. 9 Weber State ^ | 6 | – | 2 | 10 | – | 3 |
| No. 18 Idaho ^ | 6 | – | 2 | 7 | – | 5 |
| No. 25 UC Davis | 5 | – | 3 | 6 | – | 5 |
| No. 14 Montana ^ | 4 | – | 4 | 8 | – | 5 |
| Portland State | 3 | – | 5 | 4 | – | 7 |
| Eastern Washington | 2 | – | 6 | 3 | – | 8 |
| Northern Colorado | 2 | – | 6 | 3 | – | 8 |
| Northern Arizona | 2 | – | 6 | 3 | – | 8 |
| Idaho State | 1 | – | 7 | 1 | – | 10 |
| Cal Poly | 1 | – | 7 | 2 | – | 9 |
+ – Conference co-champions; ^ – FCS playoff participant; Rankings from STATS Poll

The 2022 Idaho Vandals football team represented the University of Idaho in the Big Sky Conference during the 2022 NCAA Division I FCS football season. Led by first-year head coach Jason Eck, the Vandals were 7–4 in the regular season (6–2 in Big Sky, third) and played their home games on campus at the Kibbie Dome in Moscow, Idaho. It was the program's first winning season in six years.

Idaho defeated rival Montana for the first time since 1999 and made their twelfth appearance in the FCS playoffs, the first since 1995 (the program was in FBS from 1996 through 2017).

Hired in December 2021, Eck was previously the offensive coordinator at South Dakota State; earlier, he was an assistant coach at Idaho for three seasons (2004–06).

== Preseason ==
=== Polls ===
During the virtual Big Sky Kickoff on July 25, the Vandals were predicted to finish eighth by the coaches, and ninth by the media.

=== Preseason All–Big Sky team ===
The Vandals had one player selected to the preseason all-Big Sky team.

Defense

Fa'Avae Fa'Avae – OLB

== Roster ==
2022 Idaho Vandals football team roster
Players
Coaches
Offense

| Pos. | # | Name | Class |
|---|---|---|---|
| WR | 0 | Terez Traynor | Jr |
| WR | 1 | Jermaine Jackson | Sr |
| WR | 2 | Michael Noil | Jr |
| RB | 3 | Nick Romano | Jr |
| QB | 4 | Gevani McCoy | So |
| QB | 5 | J'Bore Gibbs | Jr |
| QB | 7 | C. J. Jordan | So |
| QB | 8 | Tyler Webb | Fr |
| WR | 11 | Jalen Grable | So |
| TE | 12 | Connor Whitney | Sr |
| QB, RB | 13 | Zach Borisch | Jr |
| QB | 18 | Ridge Docekal | Fr |
| QB | 19 | Jack Layne | Fr |
| RB | 20 | Elisha Cummings | So |
| WR | 21 | Jordan Dwyey | Fr |
| RB | 22 | Aundre Carter | Jr |
| RB | 24 | Roshaun Johnson | Sr |
| TE | 27 | Spencer Fisher | Fr |
| RB | 28 | Anthony Woods | Fr |
| TE | 33 | Jake Cox | So |
| RB | 39 | Trent Elstad | Fr |
| WR | 42 | Trais Higgins | Fr |
| WR | 44 | Luke Borchardt | Fr |
| WR | 48 | Travis Jerome | So |
| TE | 49 | Chance Bogan | Fr |
| OL | 54 | Logan Floyd | Sr |
| OL | 55 | Abe Christensen | So |
| OL | 58 | Greyson Harwood | So |
| OL | 60 | Logan Harris | So |
| OL | 61 | Jacob Graves | Fr |
| OL | 62 | Connor Wood | So |
| OL | 65 | Jack Foster | Fr |
| OL | 66 | Jory Dotts | So |
| OL | 67 | Kevin Eldredge | So |
| OL | 68 | Charlie Vliem | Fr |
| OL | 70 | Cooper Carlson | Fr |
| OL | 71 | Tigana Cisse | Fr |
| OL | 72 | Elijah Sanchez | So |
| OL | 74 | Nate Azzopardi | So |
| OL | 75 | Ayden Knapik | Fr |
| OL | 77 | Jason Hahlbeck | GS |
| OL | 78 | Beau St. John | Sr |
| WR | 80 | Hayden Hatten | Jr |
| TE | 81 | Jack Schuster | So |
| WR | 83 | Booker Rush | So |
| TE | 84 | Alex Moore | So |
| WR | 85 | Michael Graves | So |
| TE | 86 | Dalton Cash | Sr |
| TE | 87 | Jackson Mason | Fr |
| WR | 88 | Daseau Puffer | So |
| WR | 89 | Tommy Hauser | Fr |

Defense

| Pos. | # | Name | Class |
|---|---|---|---|
| DB | 0 | Murvin Kenion III | So |
| LB | 2 | Fa'Avae Fa'Avae | Sr |
| DB | 3 | Jeremiah Salaam | Sr |
| DB | 4 | Arnell Walker Jr. | So |
| DB | 5 | Josh Jones | Sr |
| DB | 6 | Wyryon Noil | Sr |
| LB | 7 | Mujeeb Rufai | Jr |
| DB | 10 | Sean McCormick | Jr |
| DB | 11 | Marcus Harris | So |
| DB | 12 | Jordan Doyle | So |
| LB | 13 | Paul Moala | Jr |
| DB | 18 | Tommy McCormick | So |
| DB | 19 | Davis Dengah | So |
| LB | 20 | Sully Shannon | Jr |
| DB | 21 | Zamajay Duncan | So |
| DB | 22 | Ormaine Arnold | Fr |
| DB | 22 | Awan Parker | Sr |
| DB | 23 | Dee'Shon Swafford | So |
| LB | 24 | Isiah King | So |
| S | 25 | Jordan Velasquez | Fr |
| DB | 26 | Daniel Coverley | Fr |
| DB | 27 | Kyrin Beachem | So |
| DB | 28 | Colbey Nosworthy | So |
| LB | 30 | Brett Tommasini | So |
| DB | 31 | Mathias Bertram | So |
| DL | 33 | Leo Tamba | Sr |
| LB | 34 | Jabarii Pharms | So |
| DL | 35 | Kemari Bailey | So |
| LB | 36 | Dylan Layne | Fr |
| LB | 40 | Eddie Becker | Jr |
| OLB | 41 | Juliano Falaniko | Sr |
| DL | 44 | Jackson Bailey | So |
| LB | 45 | Mitchel Jaskowiak | Fr |
| LB | 46 | Hogan Hatten | Jr |
| LB | 47 | Colt Musgrave | So |
| OLB | 50 | Jackson Beck | Fr |
| DE | 51 | Xavier Slayton | Fr |
| DL | 52 | Carter Carlson | So |
| DL | 54 | Ben Bertram | Sr |
| LB | 57 | Jake Kindel | So |
| DL | 59 | Cooper Wooley | Fr |
| OLB | 69 | Caleb Menzel | Fr |
| DL | 90 | Malakai Williams | So |
| DL | 92 | Aamarii Notice | So |
| DL | 93 | Sam Brown | So |
| DL | 94 | Nate Degraw | Sr |
| OLB | 95 | Dylan Bartles | Fr |
| DL | 96 | Zach Krotzer | So |
| LB | 97 | Tanner Brooks | So |
| DL | 99 | Devante Keys | Jr |

Special teams

| Pos. | # | Name | Class |
|---|---|---|---|
| K, P | 10 | Ricardo Chavez | Jr |
| K | 15 | Logan Prescott | Jr |
| LS | 54 | Tyson Jacobson | Fr |

Head coach

- Jason Eck (1st year)

Coordinators/assistant coaches

- Luke Schleusner (Offensive coordinator / quarterbacks)
- Rob Aurich (Defensive coordinator)
- Thomas Ford (special teams coordinator / Running backs)
- Tyler Sutton (Tight ends)
- Tyler Yelk (safeties)
- Cody Booth (offensive line)
- David Lose (defensive line)
- Stanley Franks Jr. (cornerbacks)
- Matt Linehan (wide receivers)
- Kapono Roy Asuega (outside linebackers)

Legend

- (C) Team captain
- (S) Suspended
- (I) Ineligible
- Injured
- Redshirt

Roster
Last update: June 25, 2022

== Schedule ==
| Date | Time | Opponent | Rank | Site | TV | Result | Attendance |
|---|---|---|---|---|---|---|---|
| September 3 | 6:30 p.m. | at Washington State* | | Martin Stadium; Pullman, WA (Battle of the Palouse) | P12N | L 17–24 | 25,233 |
| September 10 | 5:00 p.m. | at Indiana* | | Memorial Stadium; Bloomington, IN | BTN | L 22–35 | 46,785 |
| September 17 | 12:00 p.m. | Drake* | | Kibbie Dome; Moscow, ID | ESPN+ | W 42–24 | 6,852 |
| September 24 | 1:00 p.m. | at Northern Arizona | | Walkup Skydome; Flagstaff, AZ | ESPN+ | W 27–10 | 7,022 |
| October 1 | 6:00 p.m. | Northern Colorado^{†} | | Kibbie Dome; Moscow, ID | ESPN+/SWX | W 55–35 | 10,759 |
| October 15 | 12:00 p.m. | at No. 3 Montana | | Washington–Grizzly Stadium; Missoula, MT (Little Brown Stein) | ESPN+ | W 30–23 | 26,314 |
| October 22 | 12:00 p.m. | Portland State | No. 17 | Kibbie Dome; Moscow, ID | ESPN+/SWX | W 56–21 | 7,357 |
| October 29 | 6:00 p.m. | at No. 2 Sacramento State | No. 14 | Hornet Stadium; Sacramento, CA | ESPN+ | L 28–31 | 17,241 |
| November 5 | 12:00 p.m. | Eastern Washington | No. 15 | Kibbie Dome; Moscow, ID | ESPN+/SWX | W 48–16 | 11,811 |
| November 12 | 4:00 p.m. | UC Davis | No. 15 | Kibbie Dome; Moscow, ID | ESPN+/SWX | L 26–44 | 7,681 |
| November 19 | 12:00 p.m. | at Idaho State | No. T–21 | Holt Arena; Pocatello, ID (rivalry) | ESPN+ | W 38–7 | 7,706 |
| November 26 | 4:00 p.m. | at No. 17 Southeastern Louisiana* | No. 18 | Strawberry Stadium; Hammond, LA (FCS First Round) | ESPN+ | L 42–45 | 3,174 |
*Non-conference game; ^{†}Homecoming; Rankings from STATS Poll released prior to the game; All times are in Pacific time

== Game summaries ==
=== at Washington State ===
Idaho Vandals (0–0) at Washington State Cougars (0–0) – Game summary

| Quarter | 1 | 2 | 3 | 4 | Total |
|---|---|---|---|---|---|
| Vandals | 10 | 0 | 0 | 7 | 17 |
| Cougars | 0 | 10 | 7 | 7 | 24 |

at Martin Stadium • Pullman, WA

- Date: September 3, 2022
- Game time: 8:00 p.m. PDT
- Game weather: 70 °F (21 °C) Sunny
- Game attendance: 25,233
- Referee: Steven Strimling
- TV announcers (P12N): J. B. Long (play-by-play), Ryan Leaf (analyst)

Game information

First quarter

- IDHO – Marcus Harris 45 Yd Fumble Return (Logan Prescott Kick), 11:11. Drive:1 play, 3 yards, 0:10.
- IDHO – Ricardo Chavez 27 Yd Field Goal 3:28. Drive: 11 plays, 69 yards, 6:24.

Second quarter

- WSU – Renard Bell 3 Yd pass from Cameron Ward (Dean Janikowski Kick), 3:13. Drive: 6 plays, 19 yards, 1:28.
- WSU – Dean Janikowski 26-yard field goal, 0:06. Drive: 9 plays, 80 yards, 3:06.

Third quarter

- WSU - De'Zhaun Stribling 13 Yd pass from Cameron Ward (Dean Janikowski Kick), 8:17. Drive: 8 plays, 58 yards, 2:29.

Fourth quarter

- WSU - Jaylen Jenkins 8 Yd pass from Cameron Ward (Dean Janikowski Kick), 10:33. Drive: 5 plays, 39 yards, 1:07.
- IDHO - Jordan Dwyer 23 Yd pass from Gevani McCoy (Ricardo Chavez Kick), 6:05. Drive:8 plays, 75 yards, 4:28.

Top passers

- IDHO – Gevani McCoy – 21/32, 212 yards, 1 TD, 2 INT
- WSU – Cam Ward – 26/41, 228 yards, 3 TD

Top rushers

- IDHO – Anthony Woods – 9 rushes, 50 yards
- WSU – Nakia Watson – 18 rushes, 117 yards

Top receivers

- IDHO – Jermaine Jackson – 6 receptions, 113 yards
- WSU – Donovan Ollie – 7 receptions, 67 yards

=== at Indiana ===
Idaho Vandals (0–1) at Indiana Hoosiers (1–0) – Game summary

| Quarter | 1 | 2 | 3 | 4 | Total |
|---|---|---|---|---|---|
| Vandals | 0 | 10 | 0 | 12 | 22 |
| Hoosiers | 0 | 0 | 23 | 12 | 35 |

at Memorial Stadium • Bloomington, IN

- Date: September 10, 2022
- Game time: 8:00 p.m. EDT
- Game attendance: 46,785
- TV: BTN

=== vs Drake ===
Drake Bulldogs (0–2) vs Idaho Vandals (0–2) – Game summary

| Quarter | 1 | 2 | 3 | 4 | Total |
|---|---|---|---|---|---|
| Bulldogs | 7 | 7 | 0 | 0 | 14 |
| Vandals | 7 | 13 | 14 | 8 | 42 |

at Kibbie Dome • Moscow, ID

- Date: September 17, 2022
- Game time: 12:00 p.m. PST
- Game attendance: 6,852
- TV: ESPN+

=== at Northern Arizona ===
Idaho Vandals (1–2) at Northern Arizona Lumberjacks (1–2) – Game summary

| Quarter | 1 | 2 | 3 | 4 | Total |
|---|---|---|---|---|---|
| Vandals | 7 | 10 | 3 | 7 | 27 |
| Lumberjacks | 7 | 3 | 0 | 0 | 10 |

at Walkup Skydome • Flagstaff, AZ

- Date: September 24, 2022
- Game time: 1:00 p.m. PST
- Game attendance: 7,022
- TV: ESPN+

=== vs Northern Colorado ===
Northern Colorado Bears (2–2) vs Idaho Vandals (2–2) – Game summary

| Quarter | 1 | 2 | 3 | 4 | Total |
|---|---|---|---|---|---|
| Bears | 6 | 14 | 8 | 7 | 35 |
| Vandals | 10 | 14 | 21 | 10 | 55 |

at Kibbie Dome • Moscow, ID

- Date: October 1, 2022
- Game time: 6:00 p.m. PST
- Game weather: Sunny
- Game attendance: 10,759
- Referee: Steve Hanni
- TV: ESPN+

Game information

First quarter

- IDHO – Jermaine Jackson 26-yard pass from Gevani McCoy (Ricardo Chavez kick), 13:25. Drive: 4 play, 75 yards, 1:35.
- NCU – David Afari 14-yard run, 9:04. Drive: 8 plays, 75 yards, 4:21.
- IDHO – Ricardo Chavez 21-yard field goal, 0:40. Drive: 15 plays, 67 yards, 8:18.

Second quarter

- NCU – Ty Arrington 31-yard pass from Dylan McCaffrey (Devin Bale kick), 7:19. Drive: 3 plays, 71 yards, 1:03.
- IDHO – Elisha Cummings 27-yard run (Ricardo Chavez kick), 4:12. Drive: 7 plays, 75 yards, 3:07.
- NCU - Elijah Dotson 2-yard run (Devin Bale kick), 1:21. Drive: 7 plays, 75 yards, 2:51.
- IDHO - Elisha Cummings 25-yard run (Ricardo Chavez kick), 0:35. Drive: 5 plays, 75 yards, 0:46.

Third quarter

- IDHO – Anthony Woods 15-yard run (Ricardo Chavez kick), 10:35. Drive: 6 plays, 59 yards, 2:50.
- NCU – Elijah Dotson 8-yard pass from Dylan McCaffrey (Ty Arrington pass), 6:43. Drive: 11 plays, 75 yards, 3:52.
- IDHO - Hayden Hatten 35-yard pass from Gevani McCoy (Ricardo Chavez kick), 5:08. Drive: 4 plays, 75 yards, 1:35.
- IDHO - Hayden Hatten 9-yard pass from Gevani McCoy (Ricardo Chavez kick), 0:36. Drive: 7 plays, 34 yards, 3:13.

Fourth quarter

- IDHO - Elisha Cummings 12-yard pass from Gevani McCoy (Ricardo Chavez kick), 7:49. Drive: 12 plays, 88 yards, 6:22.
- IDHO - Richard Chavez 39-yard field goal, 5:02. Drive: 4 plays, 5 yards, 2:14.
- NCU – Ty Arrington 11-yard pass from Jacob Sirmon (Devin Bale kick), 0:51. Drive: 9 plays, 71 yards, 4:03.

Top passers

- NCU – Dylan McCaffrey – 17/26, 264 yards, 2 TD, 2 INT
- IDHO – Gevani McCoy – 22/27, 298 yards, 4 TD

Top rushers

- NCU – Elijah Dotson – 17 carries, 77 yards, TD
- IDHO – Anthony Woods – 17 carries, 96 yards, TD

Top receivers

- NCU – Ty Arrington – 4 receptions, 56 yards, 2 TD
- IDHO – Hayden Hatten – 8 receptions, 131 yards, 2 TD

=== at No. 3 Montana ===
Idaho Vandals (3–2) at No. 3 Montana Grizzlies (5–0) – Game summary

| Quarter | 1 | 2 | 3 | 4 | Total |
|---|---|---|---|---|---|
| Vandals | 3 | 9 | 10 | 8 | 30 |
| No. 3 Grizzlies | 6 | 7 | 3 | 7 | 23 |

at Washington–Grizzly Stadium • Missoula, MT

- Date: October 15, 2022
- Game time: 12:00 p.m. PST
- Game attendance: 26,314
- TV: ESPN+

=== vs Portland State ===
Portland State Vikings (2–4) vs No. 17 Idaho Vandals (4–2) – Game summary

| Quarter | 1 | 2 | 3 | 4 | Total |
|---|---|---|---|---|---|
| Vikings | 14 | 7 | 0 | 0 | 21 |
| No. 17 Vandals | 14 | 7 | 14 | 21 | 56 |

at Kibbie Dome • Moscow, ID

- Date: October 22, 2022
- Game time: 12:00 p.m. PST
- Game attendance: 7,357
- TV: ESPN+/SWX

=== at No. 2 Sacramento State ===
No. 14 Idaho Vandals (5–2) at No. 2 Sacramento State Hornets (7–0) – Game summary

| Quarter | 1 | 2 | 3 | 4 | Total |
|---|---|---|---|---|---|
| No. 14 Vandals | 0 | 7 | 7 | 14 | 28 |
| No. 2 Hornets | 7 | 10 | 7 | 7 | 31 |

at Hornet Stadium • Sacramento, CA

- Date: October 29, 2022
- Game time: 6:00 p.m. PST
- Game attendance: 17,241
- TV: ESPN+

=== vs Eastern Washington ===
Eastern Washington Eagles (2–6) vs No. 15 Idaho Vandals (5–3) – Game summary

| Quarter | 1 | 2 | 3 | 4 | Total |
|---|---|---|---|---|---|
| Eagles | 3 | 7 | 0 | 6 | 16 |
| No. 15 Vandals | 7 | 28 | 3 | 10 | 48 |

at Kibbie Dome • Moscow, ID

- Date: November 5, 2022
- Game time: 12:00 p.m. PST
- Game attendance: 11,811
- TV: ESPN+/SWX

=== vs UC Davis ===
UC Davis Aggies (5–4) vs No. 15 Idaho Vandals (6–3) – Game summary

| Quarter | 1 | 2 | 3 | 4 | Total |
|---|---|---|---|---|---|
| Aggies | 14 | 17 | 3 | 10 | 44 |
| No. 15 Vandals | 7 | 0 | 12 | 7 | 26 |

at Kibbie Dome • Moscow, ID

- Date: November 12, 2022
- Game time: 4:00 p.m. PST
- Game attendance: 7,681
- TV: ESPN+/SWX

=== at Idaho State ===
No. 21T Idaho Vandals (6–4) at Idaho State Bengals (1–9) – Game summary

| Quarter | 1 | 2 | 3 | 4 | Total |
|---|---|---|---|---|---|
| No. 21T Vandals | 7 | 17 | 7 | 7 | 38 |
| Bengals | 7 | 0 | 0 | 0 | 7 |

at Holt Arena • Pocatello, ID

- Date: November 19, 2022
- Game time: 12:00 p.m. PST
- Game attendance: 7,706
- TV: ESPN+

== FCS Playoffs ==
=== at No. 17 Southeastern Louisiana – first round ===
Idaho Vandals (7–4) at Southeastern Louisiana Lions (8–3) – Game summary

| Quarter | 1 | 2 | 3 | 4 | Total |
|---|---|---|---|---|---|
| No. 18 Vandals | 7 | 14 | 0 | 21 | 42 |
| No. 17 Lions | 7 | 10 | 7 | 21 | 45 |

at Strawberry Stadium • Hammond, LA

- Date: November 26
- Game time: 6:00 p.m.
- Game weather: Cloudy
- Game attendance: 3,174
- Referee: Rick Wayne
- TV: ESPN+
