= 2022 Mercer Bears football team =

American college football season

2022 Mercer Bears football
- Conference: Southern Conference

Ranking
- STATS: No. 24
- FCS Coaches: No. 21
- Record: 7–4 (5–3 SoCon)
- Head coach: Drew Cronic (3rd season)
- Offensive coordinator: Bob Bodine (3rd season)
- Defensive coordinator: Joel Taylor (3rd season)
- Home stadium: Moye Complex

2022 Southern Conference football standings
	Conf.			Overall
Team	W		L	W		L
No. 7 Samford $^	8	–	0	11	–	2
No. 10 Furman ^	7	–	1	10	–	3
No. 23 Chattanooga	5	–	3	7	–	4
No. 24 Mercer	5	–	3	7	–	4
Western Carolina	4	–	4	6	–	5
Wofford	3	–	5	3	–	8
The Citadel	3	–	5	4	–	7
East Tennessee State	1	–	7	3	–	8
VMI	0	–	8	1	–	10
$ – Conference champion; ^ – FCS playoff participant; Rankings from STATS Poll

The 2022 Mercer Bears football team represented Mercer University as a member of the Southern Conference (SoCon) during the 2022 NCAA Division I FCS football season. The Bears were led by third-year head coach Drew Cronic and played their home games at Moye Complex in Macon, Georgia.

== Schedule ==
Date	Time	Opponent	Rank	Site	TV	Result	Attendance
August 27	7:00 p.m.	Morehead State*	No. 23	Five Star Stadium; Macon, GA	ESPN+	W 63–13	9,027
September 3	7:00 p.m.	at Auburn*	No. 23	Jordan–Hare Stadium; Auburn, AL	SECN+/ESPN+	L 16–42	84,562
September 17	6:00 p.m.	The Citadel	No. 20	Five Star Stadium; Macon, GA	ESPN3	W 17–0	11,339
September 24	6:00 p.m.	at Gardner–Webb*	No. 17	Ernest W. Spangler Stadium; Boiling Springs, NC	ESPN+	W 45–14	4,750
October 1	1:30 p.m.	at Wofford	No. 13	Gibbs Stadium; Spartanburg, SC	ESPN+	W 42–7	4,087
October 8	4:00 p.m.	Western Carolina	No. 12	Five Star Stadium; Macon, GA	ESPN+	W 49–6	10,927
October 15	4:00 p.m.	East Tennessee State	No. 12	Five Star Stadium; Macon, GA	ESPN+	W 55–33	10,002
October 22	1:30 p.m.	at No. 10 Chattanooga	No. 11	Finley Stadium; Chattanooga, TN	ESPN+	L 21–41	9,092
October 29	1:30 p.m.	at VMI	No. 16	Alumni Memorial Field; Lexington, VA	ESPN+	W 55–14	5,133
November 12	3:00 p.m.	No. 13 Furman	No. 14	Five Star Stadium; Macon, GA	ESPN+	L 13–23	11,729
November 19	1:00 p.m.	at No. 9 Samford	No. 19	Seibert Stadium; Homewood, AL	ESPN+	L 44–50 ^{2OT}	6,033
*Non-conference game; Rankings from STATS Poll released prior to the game; All times are in Eastern time

== Game summaries ==
=== Morehead State ===
	1	2	3	4	Total
Eagles	0	10	3	0	13
No. 23 Bears	14	28	14	7	63

=== At Auburn ===
	1	2	3	4	Total
No. 23 Bears	0	7	0	9	16
Tigers	14	14	14	0	42

=== The Citadel ===
	1	2	3	4	Total
Citadel Bulldogs	0	0	0	0	0
No. 20 Bears	0	0	14	3	17

=== At Gardner–Webb ===
	1	2	3	4	Total
No. 17 Bears	21	7	7	10	45
Runnin' Bulldogs	0	7	7	0	14

=== At Wofford ===
	1	2	3	4	Total
No. 13 Bears	14	7	14	7	42
Terriers	0	0	7	0	7

=== Western Carolina ===
	1	2	3	4	Total
Catamounts	0	0	6	0	6
No. 12 Bears	21	21	0	7	49

=== East Tennessee State ===
	1	2	3	4	Total
Buccaneers	3	17	6	7	33
No. 12 Bears	14	14	7	20	55

=== At No. 10 Chattanooga ===
	1	2	3	4	Total
No. 11 Bears	0	14	7	0	21
No. 10 Mocs	17	10	7	7	41

=== At VMI ===
	1	2	3	4	Total
No. 16 Bears	7	24	14	10	55
Keydets	0	0	14	0	14

=== No. 13 Furman ===
	1	2	3	4	Total
No. 13 Paladins	3	7	10	3	23
No. 14 Bears	0	7	0	6	13

=== At No. 9 Samford ===
	1	2	3	4	OT	2OT	Total
No. 19 Bears	17	0	3	17	7	0	44
No. 9 Samford Bulldogs	14	6	7	10	7	6	50

== Roster ==
2022 Mercer Bears football team roster
Players
Coaches
Offense

Pos.	#	Name	Class
WR	1	Devron Harper	Jr
RB	2	Austin Douglas	So
QB	4	Fred Payton	Sr
RB	5	Al Wooten II	So
QB	7	Carter Peevy	So
RB	8	Brandon Marshall	So
WR	10	Parker Wroble	So
RB	12	Fred Jackson	Sr
WR	13	Ty James	So
WR	16	Trey Adkins	Sr
QB	17	Daniel Shoch	Fr
QB	19	Chad Kearns	Fr
RB	21	Tayshaun Shipp	Jr
WR	23	Travion Solomon	Fr
RB	27	Jacob Walker	Fr
WR	29	Xavier Brantley	Fr
RB	33	Tylan Johnson	Fr
RB	35	Langston White	Fr
RB	36	Justin Coleman	So
RB	37	CJ Miller	Fr
OL	50	Cedric Richardson	Fr
OL	57	Jose Gonzalez	Fr
OL	58	Tyzen Wilkerson	Fr
OL	59	Clay Baker	So
OL	63	Eli Edwards	Fr
OL	64	Riley Adcock	So
OL	66	Riley Bell	Fr
OL	67	Hunter Brozio	So
OL	68	Ni Mansell	Jr
OL	70	Santo DeFranco	Sr
OL	71	Israel Mukwiza	So
OL	72	Caleb Carter	Fr
OL	73	John Thomas	Jr
OL	76	Nash Jensen	So
OL	77	Mac Johnson	Jr
OL	78	Peyton Bumpers	Fr
OL	79	Ari Kamau	So
TE	81	Andrew Lane	Fr
TE	82	Andrew May	So
TE	83	Drake Starks	Sr
WR	84	Nate Boehm	Fr
TE	85	Sawyer Burt	Fr
TE	86	Luke Szabados	Jr
TE	88	Baxley O’Brien	Fr
OL	-	Jason Berko	Fr
OL	-	Justin Brett	Fr
RB	-	Jamell Coast	Fr
OL	-	Elijah Heald	Fr
OL	-	Jackson Favors	Fr
OL	-	Tim Maddox	Fr
WR	-	Mikeal Sullivan	Fr

Defense

Pos.	#	Name	Class
S	0	Lance Wise	Jr
LB	3	Isaac Dowling	So
CB	6	Cam Sims	So
CB	9	Michael Campbell	Sr
EDGE	11	Solomon Zubairu	Sr
S	14	Chris Joines	Fr
LB	15	Ken Standley	So
CB	18	Corey Barnes	So
S	20	Richie Coffey	Sr
S	22	Shi’heem Watkins	Sr
LB	24	Danijah Gammage	Sr
CB	25	TJ Moore	So
S	26	Khay Loyd	Fr
S	28	Kenyatta Ward	Jr
CB	30	Kaleb Frost	Fr
CB	31	Myles Weston	Fr
S	32	Josh Pickett	Fr
S	34	Myles Redding	So
S	38	Juwan Johnson	Fr
S	39	John Stegenga	Fr
KAT	40	Isaiah Washburn	Fr
LB	41	Zach Hopkins	Sr
KAT	42	Christian Hanson	Fr
KAT	43	Myles Jones	Fr
KAT	44	Marcus Christian	Fr
S	45	Tommy Bliss	Fr
LB	46	Isaac Prince	Fr
LB	47	Tommy Pollack	Fr
S	48	Mic Wasson	Fr
LB	49	Chris Taylor	Jr
LB	51	Drew Clare	Fr
DL	52	Richard Benton Jr.	Jr
KAT	53	Royce Izundu	So
LB	55	Marques Thomas	So
DL	56	Carson Griffin	Jr
DL	60	Joshua Williams	Fr
DL	61	Pierce Vickery	Fr
DL	87	Will Pounds	Sr
DL	90	Emil Hovde	Fr
DL	91	Jordan Swain	So
KAT	92	Barrett Schmidlkofer	Fr
DL	94	Savio Frazier	So
DL	95	Robert Johnson	Fr
DL	96	Arias Nash	Fr
DL	98	Chris Hill	So
DL	99	Caden Camese	Fr
S	-	Nate Brooks	Fr
LB	-	Peyton Cromwell	Fr
CB	-	Tucker Mix	Fr
LB	-	Tripp Slaton	Fr
DL	-	Ricky Stever	Fr
LB	-	Tucker Wilson	Fr

Special teams

Pos.	#	Name	Class
LS	62	Joe Miller	Fr
LS/WR	80	Reid Brass	So
P	89	Ian Garcia	Fr
K	93	Devin Folser	Sr
P/K	97	Trey Turk	So
K	-	Bryce Addison	Fr
K	-	Christian Cole	Fr

Head coach

- Drew Cronic (head coach)

Coordinators/assistant coaches

- David A. Cole (Associate head coach / Cornerbacks / special teams coordinator)
- Bob Bodine (offensive coordinator / offensive line)
- Joel Taylor (defensive coordinator / linebackers)
- Fred Jones (Run Game Coordinator / running backs)
- Mike Adams (defensive pass game coordinator / safeties)
- Sumner Ellis (KATS / defensive recruiting coordinator)
- La'Donte Harris (Pass Game Coordinator / wide receivers)
- Jimmy Long (defensive run game coordinator / defensive line)
- Kevin O'Brien (Tight Ends / offensive recruiting coordinator)
- David Salmon (Quarterbacks / video coordinator)
- Daniel Dieudonne (volunteer assistant – defense)
- Markerious Bolden (analyst – defense)
- Evan Barr (director of strength and conditioning)

Legend

- (C) Team captain
- (S) Suspended
- (I) Ineligible
- Injured
- Redshirt

Roster
Last update: 24 September 2022
