= Josh Conklin =

American football player and coach (born 1979)

Current position
- Title: Senior defensive analyst
- Team: Virginia Tech
- Conference: ACC

Biographical details
- Born: June 19, 1979 (age 47)

Playing career
- 1998–2001: Dakota State
- Position: Linebacker

Coaching career (HC unless noted)
- 2003–2004: South Dakota State (GA)
- 2005–2006: South Dakota State (DB/ST)
- 2007–2009: Wofford (DB)
- 2010–2011: The Citadel (DC)
- 2012: Tennessee (S)
- 2013–2014: FIU (DC)
- 2015–2017: Pittsburgh (DC)
- 2018–2022: Wofford
- 2023–2024: Arkansas State (STC/S)
- 2025: Colorado (DA)
- 2026–present: Virginia Tech (DA)

Head coaching record
- Overall: 19–23
- Tournaments: 1–1 (NCAA D-I playoffs)

Accomplishments and honors

Championships
- 2 SoCon (2018–2019)

Josh Conklin (born June 19, 1979) is an American college football coach who is currently a senior defensive analyst for the Virginia Tech Hokies. He served as head football coach of Wofford College in Spartanburg, South Carolina from 2018 until midway through the 2022 season. Conklin served as the defensive coordinator at the University of Pittsburgh from 2015 to 2017. He played college football at Dakota State College in Madison, South Dakota.

Conklin and Wofford parted ways after the first five games of the 2022 season, all of which the Terriers lost.

== Head coaching record ==
Year	Team	Overall	Conference	Standing	Bowl/playoffs	FCS^{#}
Wofford Terriers (Southern Conference) (2018–2022)
2018	Wofford	9–4	6–2	T–1st	L NCAA Division I Second Round	12
2019	Wofford	8–5	7–1	1st	L NCAA Division I First Round	17
2020–21	Wofford	1–4	1–4	7th		
2021	Wofford	1–10	0–8	9th		
2022	Wofford	0–5 (Note: Wofford parted ways with Conklin after 5 games.)	0–2			
Wofford:		19–28	14–17			
Total:		19–28				
National championship Conference title Conference division title or championship game berth
