= 2022 NCAA Division I FCS football rankings =

Rankings for the 2022 NCAA Division I FCS football season

- Season: 2022
- Postseason: Single-elimination
- Preseason No. 1: North Dakota State
- National champions: South Dakota State
- Conference with most teams in final poll: Big Sky (6)

The 2022 National Collegiate Athletic Association (NCAA) Division I Football Championship Subdivision (FCS) football rankings consists of two human polls, in addition to various publications' preseason polls. Unlike the Football Bowl Subdivision (FBS), college football's governing body, the NCAA, bestows the national championship title through a 24-team tournament. The following weekly polls determine the top 25 teams at the NCAA Division I Football Championship Subdivision level of college football for the 2022 season. The STATS poll is voted by media members while the coaches poll is determined by coaches at the FCS level.

== Legend ==
Legend
	Increase in ranking
	Decrease in ranking
	Not ranked previous week
	Selected for NCAA FCS Playoffs
(Italics)	Number of first place votes
(#–#)	Win–loss record
т	Tied with team above or below also with this symbol

== STATS poll ==
	Preseason August 8	Week 1 September 5	Week 2 September 12	Week 3 September 19	Week 4 September 26	Week 5 October 3	Week 6 October 10	Week 7 October 17	Week 8 October 24	Week 9 October 31	Week 10 November 7	Week 11 November 14	Week 12 November 21	Final January 13	
1.	North Dakota State (52)	North Dakota State (1–0) (52)	North Dakota State (2–0) (52)	North Dakota State (2–1) (43)	North Dakota State (3–1) (44)	North Dakota State (4–1) (45)	North Dakota State (5–1) (41)	South Dakota State (6–1) (51)	South Dakota State (7–1) (51)	South Dakota State (8–1) (53)	South Dakota State (9–1) (48)	South Dakota State (10–1) (47)	South Dakota State (10–1) (45)	South Dakota State (14–1) (54)	1.
2.	South Dakota State (2)	South Dakota State (0–1) (2)	South Dakota State (1–1) (2)	Montana (3–0) т (6)	South Dakota State (3–1) (3)	South Dakota State (4–1) (3)	South Dakota State (5–1) (7)	Sacramento State (6–0) (1)	Sacramento State (7–0) (2)	Sacramento State (8–0) (1)	Sacramento State (9–0) (6)	Sacramento State (10–0) (7)	Sacramento State (11–0) (9)	North Dakota State (12–3)	2.
3.	Montana	Montana (1–0)	Montana (2–0)	South Dakota State (2–1) т (5)	Montana (4–0) (7)	Montana (5–0)	Montana (5–0) (7)	Montana State (6–1)	Montana State (7–1)	Montana State (7–1)	Montana State (8–1)	Montana State (9–1)	Montana State (10–1)	Incarnate Word (12–2)	3.
4.	Montana State	Montana State (1–0)	Montana State (2–0)	Montana State (2–1) т	Montana State (3–1)	Montana State (4–1)	Montana State (5–1)	North Dakota State (5–2)	North Dakota State (5–2)	North Dakota State (6–2)	North Dakota State (7–2)	North Dakota State (8–2)	North Dakota State (9–2)	Montana State (12–2)	4.
5.	Missouri State	Missouri State (1–0)	Missouri State (2–0)	Incarnate Word (3–0) т	Sacramento State (3–0)	Sacramento State (4–0)	Sacramento State (5–0)	Weber State (6–0)	Weber State (6–1) т	Weber State (7–1)	Holy Cross (9–0)	Incarnate Word (9–1)	Incarnate Word (10–1)	Sacramento State (12–1)	5.
6.	Villanova	Villanova (1–0)	Incarnate Word (2–0)	Missouri State (2–1)	Delaware (4–0)	Delaware (5–0)	Weber State (5–0)	Holy Cross (6–0)	Holy Cross (7–0) т	Holy Cross (8–0)	Incarnate Word (9–1)	Holy Cross (10–0)	William & Mary (10–1)	Holy Cross (12–1)	6.
7.	Sacramento State	Sacramento State (1–0)	Villanova (2–0)	Sacramento State (2–0)	Missouri State (2–2)	Weber State (4–0)	Holy Cross (6–0)	Montana (5–1)	Chattanooga (6–1)	Incarnate Word (8–1)	Weber State (7–2)	Weber State (8–2)	Holy Cross (11–0)	Samford (11–2)	7.
8.	Kennesaw State	Incarnate Word (1–0)	Sacramento State (1–0)	Delaware (3–0)	Weber State (4–0)	Jackson State (4–0)	Jackson State (5–0) т	Incarnate Word (6–1)	Incarnate Word (7–1)	William & Mary (7–1)	William & Mary (8–1)	William & Mary (9–1)	Samford (10–1)	William & Mary (11–2)	8.
9.	Southern Illinois	East Tennessee State (1–0)	Delaware (2–0)	Villanova (2–1)	Jackson State (4–0)	Holy Cross (5–0)	Incarnate Word (5–1) т	Jackson State (6–0) (2)	Jackson State (7–0) (1)	Jackson State (8–0)	Jackson State (9–0)	Samford (9–1)	Weber State (9–2)	Weber State (10–3)	9.
10.	Stephen F. Austin	Delaware (1–0)	Chattanooga (2–0)	Chattanooga (3–0)	Holy Cross (4–0)	Incarnate Word (4–1)	Chattanooga (4–1)	Chattanooga (5–1)	William & Mary (6–1)	Samford (7–1)	Samford (8–1)	Jackson State (10–0)	Jackson State (11–0)	Furman (10–3)	10.
11.	East Tennessee State	Chattanooga (1–0)	Jackson State (2–0)	Jackson State (3–0)	Incarnate Word (3–1)	Chattanooga (4–1)	William & Mary (5–1)	Mercer (6–1)	Montana (5–2)	Chattanooga (6–2)	Chattanooga (7–2)	Richmond (8–2)	Furman (9–2)	Richmond (9–4)	11.
12.	Chattanooga	Eastern Washington (1–0)	Weber State (2–0)	Weber State (3–0)	Chattanooga (3–1)	Mercer (4–1)	Mercer (5–1)	William & Mary (5–1)	Delaware (6–1)	Mercer (7–2)	Richmond (7–2)	Furman (8–2)	Elon (8–3)	Southeastern Louisiana (9–4)	12.
13.	Eastern Washington	Jackson State (1–0)	Holy Cross (2–0)	Holy Cross (3–0)	Mercer (3–1)	Samford (4–1)	Delaware (5–1)	Delaware (5–1)	Samford (6–1)	Furman (7–2)	Furman (7–2)	Montana (7–3)	Richmond (8–3)	New Hampshire (9–4)	13.
14.	Incarnate Word	UT Martin (1–0)	Eastern Washington (1–1)	William & Mary (3–0)	Villanova (2–2)	Elon (4–1)	Elon (5–1)	Southern Illinois (5–2)	Idaho (5–2)	Richmond (6–2)	Mercer (7–2)	Elon (8–3)	Southeast Missouri State (9–2)	Montana (8–5)	14.
15.	Jackson State	Holy Cross (1–0)	William & Mary (2–0)	Eastern Washington (1–1)	UT Martin (2–2)	Villanova (3–2)	Samford (5–1)	Samford (5–1)	Southeast Missouri State (6–1)	Idaho (5–3)	Idaho (6–3)	Chattanooga (7–3)	New Hampshire (8–3)	Southeast Missouri State (9–3)	15.
16.	Holy Cross	Weber State (1–0)	UT Martin (1–1)	Eastern Kentucky (2–1)	Samford (3–1)	William & Mary (4–1)	Southern Illinois (4–2)	Southeast Missouri (5–1)	Mercer (6–2)	Montana (5–3)	Montana (6–3)	North Dakota (7–3)	Fordham (9–2)	Jackson State (12–1)	16.
17.	Southeastern Louisiana	Southern Illinois (0–1)	Rhode Island (2–0)	Mercer (2–1)	Richmond (3–1)	Southern Illinois (3–2)	Villanova (3–2)	Idaho (4–2)	Richmond (5–2)	New Hampshire (6–2)	Delaware (7–2)	Southeast Missouri State (8–2)	Southeastern Louisiana (8–3)	Elon (8–4)	17.
18.	UT Martin	Stephen F. Austin (1–1)	East Tennessee State (1–1)	UT Martin (1–2)	William & Mary (3–1)	UT Martin (3–2)	Southeast Missouri State (5–1)	UT Martin (4–2)	Rhode Island (5–2)	Delaware (6–2)	Elon (7–3)	New Hampshire (7–3)	Idaho (7–4)	Idaho (7–5)	18.
19.	Delaware	Kennesaw State (0–1)	Eastern Kentucky (1–1)	North Dakota (2–1)	Southern Illinois (2–2)	Southeastern Louisiana (3–2)	UT Martin (4–2)	Richmond (4–2)	New Hampshire (6–2)	Elon (6–3)	North Dakota (6–3)	Mercer (7–3)	Montana (7–4)	Delaware (8–5)	19.
20.	Weber State	William & Mary (1–0)	Mercer (1–1)	Rhode Island (2–1)	Eastern Washington (1–2)	Missouri State (2–3)	North Dakota (4–2)	North Dakota (4–2)	Southern Illinois (5–3)	UT Martin (5–3)	Southeast Missouri State (7–2)	Delaware (7–3)	North Dakota (7–4)	North Dakota (7-5)	20.
21.	Northern Iowa	Southeastern Louisiana (0–1)	Stephen F. Austin (1–2)	Samford (2–1)	Southeastern Louisiana (2–2)	Southeast Missouri State (4–1)	Richmond (3–2)	Elon (5–2)	UT Martin (4–3)	North Dakota (5–3)	New Hampshire (6–3)	Fordham (8–2) т	Chattanooga (7–4)	North Carolina Central (10–2)	21.
22.	Rhode Island	Rhode Island (1–0)	North Dakota (1–1)	Richmond (2–1)	Austin Peay (4–1)	North Dakota (3–2)	Fordham (5–1)	Rhode Island (4–2)	Fordham (6–1)	Southeast Missouri State (6–2)	Rhode Island (6–3)	Idaho (6–4) т	Mercer (7–4)	Fordham (9–3)	22.
23.	Mercer	Mercer (1–1)	Kennesaw State (0–2)	Stephen F. Austin (1–2)	Elon (3–1)	Richmond (3–2)	Eastern Kentucky (3–2)	Fordham (6–1)	North Dakota (4–3)	Rhode Island (5–3)	Fordham (7–2)	Southeastern Louisiana (7–3)	Delaware (7–4)	Chattanooga (7–4)	23.
24.	Richmond	Northern Iowa (0–1)	Samford (1–1)	Southern Illinois (1–2)	Southeast Missouri State (3–1)	Eastern Washington (1–3)	Austin Peay (4–2)	Austin Peay (5–2)	Furman (6–2)	Fordham (6–2)	Princeton (8–0)	UC Davis (6–4)	UC Davis (6–5)	Mercer (7–4)	24.
25.	UC Davis	Samford (1–0)	New Hampshire (2–0)	North Carolina Central (3–0)	Eastern Kentucky (2–2)	Eastern Kentucky (3–2)	Rhode Island (3–2) т Southeastern Louisiana (3–3) т	New Hampshire (5–2)	Austin Peay (5–2)	Princeton (7–0)	Southeastern Louisiana (6–3)	UT Martin (6–4)	UT Martin (7–4)	UC Davis (6–5)	25.
	Preseason August 8	Week 1 September 5	Week 2 September 12	Week 3 September 19	Week 4 September 26	Week 5 October 3	Week 6 October 10	Week 7 October 17	Week 8 October 24	Week 9 October 31	Week 10 November 7	Week 11 November 14	Week 12 November 21	Final January 13	
		Dropped: No. 24 Richmond; No. 25 UC Davis	Dropped: No. 17 Southern Illinois; No. 21 Southeastern Louisiana; No. 24 Northern Iowa	Dropped: No. 18 East Tennessee State; No. 23 Kennesaw State; No. 25 New Hampshire	Dropped: No. 19 North Dakota; No. 20 Rhode Island; No. 23 Stephen F. Austin; No. 25 North Carolina Central	Dropped: No. 22 Austin Peay	Dropped: No. 20 Missouri State; No. 24 Eastern Washington	Dropped: No. 17 Villanova; No. 23 Eastern Kentucky; No. 25т Southeastern Louisiana	Dropped: No. 21 Elon	Dropped: No. 20 Southern Illinois; No. 25 Austin Peay	Dropped: No. 20 UT Martin	Dropped: No. 22 Rhode Island; No. 24 Princeton	None	Dropped: No. 25 UT Martin	

== Coaches' poll ==
	Preseason August 15	Week 1 September 6	Week 2 September 12	Week 3 September 19	Week 4 September 26	Week 5 October 3	Week 6 October 10	Week 7 October 17	Week 8 October 24	Week 9 October 31	Week 10 November 7	Week 11 November 14	Week 12 November 21	Final January 13	
1.	North Dakota State (24)	North Dakota State (1–0) (26)	North Dakota State (2–0) (26)	North Dakota State (2–1) (21)	North Dakota State (3–1) (24)	North Dakota State (4–1) (24)	North Dakota State (5–1) (23)	South Dakota State (6–1) (26)	South Dakota State (7–1) (25)	South Dakota State (8–1) (25)	South Dakota State (9–1) (21)	South Dakota State (10–1) (23)	South Dakota State (10–1) (24)	South Dakota State (14–1) (26)	1.
2.	Montana	Montana (1–0) (1)	Montana (2–0) (1)	Montana (3–0) (5)	Montana (4–0) (4)	Montana (5–0) (3)	Montana (5–0) (3)	Montana State (6–1)	Montana State (7–1)	Montana State (7–1)	Sacramento State (9–0) (6)	Sacramento State (10–0) (5)	Sacramento State (11–0) (4)	North Dakota State (12–3)	2.
3.	South Dakota State (1)	South Dakota State (0–1) (1)	South Dakota State (1–1)	South Dakota State (2–1)	South Dakota State (3–1)	South Dakota State (4–1)	South Dakota State (5–1)	Sacramento State (6–0) (1)	Sacramento State (7–0) (1)	Sacramento State (8–0) (2)	Montana State (8–1)	Montana State (9–1)	Montana State (10–1)	Incarnate Word (12–2)	3.
4.	Montana State	Montana State (1–0)	Montana State (2–0)	Missouri State (2–1) т	Montana State (3–1)	Sacramento State (4–0)	Montana State (5–1)	North Dakota State (5–2)	North Dakota State (5–2)	North Dakota State (6–2)	North Dakota State (7–2)	North Dakota State (8–2)	North Dakota State (9–2)	Sacramento State (12–1)	4.
5.	Villanova	Villanova (1–0)	Villanova (2–0)	Montana State (2–1) т	Sacramento State (3–0)	Montana State (4–1)	Sacramento State (5–0)	Weber State (6–0)	Jackson State (7–0)	Jackson State (8–0)	Jackson State (9–0)	Jackson State (10–0)	Jackson State (11–0)	Montana State (11–2)	5.
6.	Kennesaw State	Sacramento State (1–0)	Missouri State (2–0)	Sacramento State (2–0)	Delaware (4–0)	Delaware (5–0)	Weber State (5–0)	Jackson State (6–0)	Chattanooga (6–1)	Weber State (7–1)	Holy Cross (9–0)	Holy Cross (10–0)	Holy Cross (11–0)	Holy Cross (12–1)	6.
7.	Sacramento State	Missouri State (1–0)	Sacramento State (1–0)	Incarnate Word (3–0)	Weber State (4–0)	Weber State (4–0)	Jackson State (5–0)	Montana (5–1)	Weber State (6–1)	Holy Cross (8–0)	Incarnate Word (9–1)	Incarnate Word (9–1)	Incarnate Word (10–1)	Samford (11–2)	7.
8.	Missouri State	East Tennessee State (1–0)	Incarnate Word (2–0)	Delaware (3–0)	Jackson State (4–0)	Jackson State (4–0)	Holy Cross (6–0)	Chattanooga (5–1)	Holy Cross (7–0)	Incarnate Word (8–1)	William & Mary (8–1)	William & Mary (9–1)	William & Mary (10–1)	William & Mary (11–2)	8.
9.	Southern Illinois	Incarnate Word (1–0)	Chattanooga (2–0)	Chattanooga (3–0)	Missouri State (2–2)	Chattanooga (4–1)	Chattanooga (4–1)	Holy Cross (6–0)	Incarnate Word (7–1)	William & Mary (7–1)	Samford (8–1)	Samford (9–1)	Samford (10–1)	Weber State (10–3)	9.
10.	Stephen F. Austin	Chattanooga (1–0)	Delaware (2–0)	Villanova (2–1)	Chattanooga (3–1)	Holy Cross (5–0)	Incarnate Word (5–1)	Incarnate Word (6–1)	Montana (5–2)	Samford (7–1)	Weber State (7–2)	Weber State (8–2)	Weber State (9–2)	Furman (10–3)	10.
11.	East Tennessee State	Eastern Washington (1–0)	Jackson State (2–0)	Jackson State (3–0)	Holy Cross (4–0)	Incarnate Word (4–1)	Mercer (5–1)	Mercer (6–1)	Delaware (6–1)	Mercer (7–2)	Mercer (7–2)	Richmond (8–2)	Furman (9–2)	Jackson State (12–1)	11.
12.	Eastern Washington	Stephen F. Austin (1–1)	Holy Cross (2–0)	Weber State (3–0)	Incarnate Word (3–1)	Mercer (4–1)	Delaware (5–1)	Delaware (5–1)	William & Mary (6–1)	Chattanooga (6–2)	Chattanooga (7–2)	Montana (7–3)	Southeast Missouri State (9–2)	Richmond (9–4)	12.
13.	Chattanooga	Delaware (1–0)	Weber State (2–0)	Holy Cross (3–0)	Mercer (3–1)	Villanova (3–2)	William & Mary (5–1)	William & Mary (5–1)	Samford (6–1)	Montana (5–3)	Richmond (7–2)	Furman (8–2)	Fordham (9–2)	Southeast Missouri State (9–3)	13.
14.	Incarnate Word	UT Martin (1–0)	Rhode Island (2–0)	William & Mary (3–0)	Stephen F. Austin (2–2)	UT Martin (3–2)	UT Martin (4–2)	UT Martin (4–2)	Southeast Missouri State (6–1)	Richmond (6–2)	Montana (7–2)	Fordham (8–2)	Richmond (8–3)	Montana (8–5)	14.
15.	UT Martin	Jackson State (1–0)	Eastern Washington (1–1)	Eastern Washington (1–1)	Villanova (2–2)	Samford (4–1)	Samford (5–1)	Samford (5–1)	Fordham (6–1)	UT Martin (5–3)	Delaware (7–2)	Southeast Missouri State (8–2)	Elon (8–3)	New Hampshire (9–4)	15.
16.	Southeastern Louisiana	Holy Cross (1–0)	Stephen F. Austin (1–2)	Mercer (2–1)	Austin Peay (4–1)	Fordham (4–1)	Villanova (3–2)	Fordham (6–1)	Mercer (6–2)	Delaware (6–2)	Furman (7–2) т	Mercer (7–3)	New Hampshire (8–3)	Fordham (9–3)	16.
17.	Jackson State	Weber State (1–0)	William & Mary (2–0)	Stephen F. Austin (1–2)	UT Martin (2–2)	William & Mary (4–1)	Fordham (5–1)	Southern Illinois (5–2)	Rhode Island (5–2)	Princeton (7–0)	Princeton (8–0) т	Chattanooga (7–3)	Montana (7–4)	North Carolina Central (10–2)	17.
18.	Holy Cross	Kennesaw State (0–1)	UT Martin (1–1)	Fordham (3–0)	Eastern Washington (1–2)	Elon (4–1)	Elon (5–1)	Southeast Missouri State (5–1)	UT Martin (4–3)	Fordham (6–2)	Fordham (7–2)	Elon (8–3)	Mercer (7–4)	Elon (8–4)	18.
19.	Delaware	Southern Illinois (0–1)	East Tennessee State (1–1)	UT Martin (1–2)	Samford (3–1)	Missouri State (2–3)	Southern Illinois (4–2)	Rhode Island (4–2)	Stephen F. Austin (5–3)	Furman (7–2)	Southeast Missouri State (7–2)	Delaware (7–3)	St. Thomas (MN) (10–1)	Southeastern Louisiana (9–4)	19.
20.	Weber State	Rhode Island (1–0) т	Mercer (1–1)	Eastern Kentucky (2–1)	Fordham (3–1)	Southeastern Louisiana (3–2)	Stephen F. Austin (3–3)	Stephen F. Austin (4–3)	Richmond (5–2)	Southeast Missouri State (6–2)	Idaho (6–3)	New Hampshire (7–3)	Florida A&M (9–2)	St. Thomas (MN)	20.
21.	Northern Iowa	Southeastern Louisiana (0–1) т	Fordham (2–0)	Rhode Island (2–1)	William & Mary (3–1)	Eastern Washington (1–3)	Southeast Missouri State (5–1)	Richmond (4–2)	Austin Peay (5–2)	New Hampshire (6–2)	Elon (7–3)	St. Thomas (MN) (9–1)	North Carolina Central (9–2)	Mercer (7–4)	21.
22.	UC Davis	William & Mary (1–0)	Kennesaw State (0–2)	Samford (2–1)	Richmond (3–1)	Stephen F. Austin (2–3)	Rhode Island (3–2)	Austin Peay (5–2)	Princeton (6–0)	Rhode Island (5–3)	Rhode Island (6–3)	Princeton (8–1)	Chattanooga (7–4)	Idaho (7–5)	22.
23.	Mercer	Mercer (1–1)	Youngstown State (2–0)	Austin Peay (3–1)	Elon (3–1)	Rhode Island (3–2)	Princeton (4–0)	Princeton (5–0)	Idaho (5–2)	Elon (6–3)	St. Thomas (MN) (8–1)	North Dakota (7–3)	Southeastern Louisiana (8–3)	Florida A&M (9–2)	23.
24.	Rhode Island т	Northern Iowa (0–1)	Eastern Kentucky (1–1)	Richmond (2–1) т	Southeastern Louisiana (2–2)	Southern Illinois (3–2)	Austin Peay (4–2)	Idaho (4–2)	Southern Illinois (5–3)	Idaho (5–3)	Eastern Kentucky (6–3)	Florida A&M (8–2)	Idaho (7–4) т	Delaware (8–5) т	24.
25.	Richmond т	UC Davis (0–1)	Samford (1–1)	Youngstown State (2–1) т	Rhode Island (2–2)	Southeast Missouri State (4–1)	Richmond (3–2)	Elon (5–2)	New Hampshire (6–2)	St. Thomas (MN) (7–1)	New Hampshire (6–3)	North Carolina Central (8–2)	North Dakota (7–4) т	Chattanooga (7–4) т	25.
	Preseason August 15	Week 1 September 6	Week 2 September 12	Week 3 September 19	Week 4 September 26	Week 5 October 3	Week 6 October 10	Week 7 October 17	Week 8 October 24	Week 9 October 31	Week 10 November 7	Week 11 November 14	Week 12 November 21	Final January 13	
		Dropped: No. 24 Richmond	Dropped: No. 19 Southern Illinois; No. 20т Southeastern Louisiana; No. 24 Northern Iowa; No. 25 UC Davis	Dropped: No. 19 East Tennessee State; No. 22 Kennesaw State	Dropped: No. 20 Eastern Kentucky; No. 24т Youngstown State	Dropped: No. 16 Austin Peay; No. 22 Richmond	Dropped: No. 19 Missouri State; No. 20 Southeastern Louisiana; No. 21 Eastern Washington	Dropped: No. 16 Villanova	Dropped: No. 25 Elon	Dropped: No. 19 Stephen F. Austin; No. 21 Austin Peay; No. 24 Southern Illinois	Dropped: No. 15 UT Martin	Dropped: No. 20 Idaho; No. 22 Rhode Island; No. 24 Eastern Kentucky	Dropped: No. 19 Delaware; No. 22 Princeton	Dropped: No. 24 North Dakota	
