= 2022 Harvard Crimson football team =

American college football season

2022 Harvard Crimson football
- Conference: Ivy League
- Record: 6–4 (4–3 Ivy)
- Head coach: Tim Murphy (28th season)
- Offensive coordinator: Mickey Fein (2nd season)
- Offensive scheme: Pro spread
- Defensive coordinator: Scott Larkee (13th season)
- Base defense: 4–3
- Captain: Truman Jones
- Home stadium: Harvard Stadium

2022 Ivy League football standings
	Conf.			Overall
Team	W		L	W		L
Yale $	6	–	1	8	–	2
Penn	5	–	2	8	–	2
Princeton	5	–	2	8	–	2
Harvard	4	–	3	6	–	4
Columbia	3	–	4	6	–	4
Cornell	2	–	5	5	–	5
Dartmouth	2	–	5	3	–	7
Brown	1	–	6	3	–	7
$ – Conference champion; Rankings from STATS Poll

The 2022 Harvard Crimson football team represented Harvard University as a member of the Ivy League during the 2022 NCAA Division I FCS football season. The team was led by 28th-year head coach Tim Murphy and played its home games at Harvard Stadium.

== Schedule ==
Date	Time	Opponent	Site	TV	Result	Attendance
September 16	7:00 p.m.	Merrimack*	Harvard Stadium; Boston, MA	ESPN+	W 28–21 ^{OT}	10,946
September 24	12:30 p.m.	at Brown	Richard Gouse Field at Brown Stadium; Providence, RI	ESPN+	W 35–28	9,395
October 1	1:00 p.m.	No. 10 Holy Cross*	Harvard Stadium; Boston, MA	ESPN+	L 21–30	7,726
October 7	7:00 p.m.	at Cornell	Schoellkopf Field; Ithaca, NY	ESPNU	W 35–28	4,205
October 15	4:00 p.m.	at Howard*	Audi Field; Washington, DC (Truth & Service Classic)	ESPN3	W 41–25	8,097
October 21	7:00 p.m.	Princeton	Harvard Stadium; Boston, MA (rivalry)	ESPNU	L 10–37	10,793
October 29	1:30 p.m.	at Dartmouth	Memorial Field; Hanover, NH (rivalry)	ESPN+	W 28–13	8,735
November 5	1:00 p.m.	Columbia	Harvard Stadium; Boston, MA	ESPN+	L 20–21	13,972
November 12	1:00 p.m.	at Penn	Franklin Field; Philadelphia, PA (rivalry)	ESPN+	W 37–14	10,370
November 19	12:00 p.m.	Yale	Harvard Stadium; Boston, MA (rivalry)	ESPNU	L 14–19	30,006
*Non-conference game; Rankings from STATS Poll released prior to the game; All times are in Eastern time

== Game summaries ==
=== Merrimack ===
	1	2	3	4	OT	Total
Warriors	0	7	6	8	0	21
Crimson	0	7	0	14	7	28

=== At Brown ===
	1	2	3	4	Total
Crimson	7	14	14	0	35
Bears	0	0	7	21	28

=== No. 10 Holy Cross ===
	1	2	3	4	Total
No. 10 Crusaders	7	10	7	6	30
Crimson	7	7	7	0	21

=== At Cornell ===
	1	2	3	4	Total
Crimson	0	13	7	15	35
Big Red	7	0	7	14	28

=== At Howard ===
	1	2	3	4	Total
Crimson	10	7	14	10	41
Bison	0	17	0	8	25

=== Princeton ===
	1	2	3	4	Total
Tigers	7	7	14	9	37
Crimson	3	7	0	0	10

=== At Dartmouth ===
	1	2	3	4	Total
Crimson	7	7	7	7	28
Big Green	0	13	0	0	13

=== Columbia ===
	1	2	3	4	Total
Lions	0	10	3	8	21
Crimson	7	10	3	0	20

=== At Penn ===
	1	2	3	4	Total
Crimson	7	17	10	3	37
Quakers	7	0	7	0	14

=== Yale ===
	1	2	3	4	Total
Bulldogs	7	3	3	6	19
Crimson	0	7	0	7	14
