= 2022 Dartmouth Big Green football team =

American college football season

2022 Dartmouth Big Green football
- Conference: Ivy League
- Record: 3–7 (2–5 Ivy)
- Head coach: Buddy Teevens (22nd season)
- Offensive coordinator: Kevin Daft (5th season)
- Offensive scheme: Option
- Defensive coordinator: Don Dobes (12th season)
- Base defense: 4–3
- Home stadium: Memorial Field

2022 Ivy League football standings
| | Conf. | | | Overall |
| Team | W | | L | W | | L |
|---|---|---|---|---|---|---|
| Yale $ | 6 | – | 1 | 8 | – | 2 |
| Penn | 5 | – | 2 | 8 | – | 2 |
| Princeton | 5 | – | 2 | 8 | – | 2 |
| Harvard | 4 | – | 3 | 6 | – | 4 |
| Columbia | 3 | – | 4 | 6 | – | 4 |
| Cornell | 2 | – | 5 | 5 | – | 5 |
| Dartmouth | 2 | – | 5 | 3 | – | 7 |
| Brown | 1 | – | 6 | 3 | – | 7 |
$ – Conference champion; Rankings from STATS Poll

The 2022 Dartmouth Big Green football team represented Dartmouth College as a member of the Ivy League during the 2022 NCAA Division I FCS football season. Led by Buddy Teevens in his 22nd and final season as head coach, the Big Green compiled an overall record of 3–7 with a mark of 2–5 in conference play, tying for sixth place in the Ivy League. Dartmouth played home games at Memorial Field in Hanover, New Hampshire.

== Schedule ==
| Date | Time | Opponent | Site | TV | Result | Attendance |
|---|---|---|---|---|---|---|
| September 17 | 1:30 p.m. | Valparaiso* | Memorial Field; Hanover, NH | ESPN+ | W 35–13 | 3,562 |
| September 24 | 2:00 p.m. | at Sacred Heart* | Campus Field; Fairfield, CT | NEC Front Row | L 31–38 | 6,293 |
| September 30 | 7:00 p.m. | Penn | Memorial Field; Hanover, NH | ESPNU | L 17–23 ^{2OT} | 4,767 |
| October 8 | 12:00 p.m. | at Yale | Yale Bowl; New Haven, CT | ESPN+ | L 21–24 | 6,300 |
| October 15 | 1:30 p.m. | New Hampshire* | Memorial Field; Hanover, NH (Rivalry) | ESPN+ | L 0–14 | 3,580 |
| October 22 | 1:30 p.m. | at Columbia | Robert K. Kraft Field at Lawrence A. Wien Stadium; New York, NY | ESPN+ | W 27–24 | 11,023 |
| October 29 | 1:30 p.m. | Harvard^{†} | Memorial Field; Hanover, NH (Rivalry) | ESPN+ | L 13–28 | 8,735 |
| November 5 | 1:00 p.m. | at No. 25 Princeton | Powers Field at Princeton Stadium; Princeton, NJ | ESPN+ | L 14–17 | 6,413 |
| November 12 | 1:00 p.m. | at Cornell | Schoellkopf Field; Ithaca, NY (Rivalry) | ESPN+ | L 13–17 | 4,212 |
| November 19 | 1:30 p.m. | Brown | Memorial Field; Hanover, NH | ESPN+ | W 30–7 | 2,678 |
*Non-conference game; ^{†}Homecoming; Rankings from STATS Poll released prior to the game; All times are in Eastern time

== Game summaries ==
=== Valparaiso ===
| | 1 | 2 | 3 | 4 | Total |
|---|---|---|---|---|---|
| Beacons | 3 | 7 | 3 | 0 | 13 |
| Big Green | 7 | 14 | 7 | 7 | 35 |

=== At Sacred Heart ===
| | 1 | 2 | 3 | 4 | OT | Total |
|---|---|---|---|---|---|---|
| Big Green | 21 | 0 | 10 | 0 | 0 | 31 |
| Pioneers | 3 | 14 | 7 | 7 | 7 | 38 |

=== Penn ===
| | 1 | 2 | 3 | 4 | OT | 2OT | Total |
|---|---|---|---|---|---|---|---|
| Quakers | 7 | 0 | 0 | 3 | 7 | 6 | 23 |
| Big Green | 0 | 3 | 0 | 7 | 7 | 0 | 17 |

=== At Yale ===
| | 1 | 2 | 3 | 4 | Total |
|---|---|---|---|---|---|
| Big Green | 7 | 0 | 0 | 14 | 21 |
| Bulldogs | 0 | 10 | 14 | 0 | 24 |

=== New Hampshire ===
| | 1 | 2 | 3 | 4 | Total |
|---|---|---|---|---|---|
| Wildcats | 7 | 7 | 0 | 0 | 14 |
| Big Green | 0 | 0 | 0 | 0 | 0 |

=== At Columbia ===
| | 1 | 2 | 3 | 4 | Total |
|---|---|---|---|---|---|
| Big Green | 7 | 7 | 10 | 3 | 27 |
| Lions | 3 | 6 | 8 | 7 | 24 |

=== Harvard ===
| | 1 | 2 | 3 | 4 | Total |
|---|---|---|---|---|---|
| Crimson | 7 | 7 | 7 | 7 | 28 |
| Big Green | 0 | 13 | 0 | 0 | 13 |

=== At No. 25 Princeton ===
| | 1 | 2 | 3 | 4 | Total |
|---|---|---|---|---|---|
| Big Green | 7 | 0 | 0 | 7 | 14 |
| No. 25 Tigers | 14 | 3 | 0 | 0 | 17 |

=== At Cornell ===
| | 1 | 2 | 3 | 4 | Total |
|---|---|---|---|---|---|
| Big Green | 0 | 6 | 7 | 0 | 13 |
| Big Red | 0 | 7 | 7 | 3 | 17 |

=== Brown ===
| | 1 | 2 | 3 | 4 | Total |
|---|---|---|---|---|---|
| Bears | 0 | 0 | 0 | 7 | 7 |
| Big Green | 7 | 13 | 0 | 10 | 30 |
