= 2022 Yale Bulldogs football team =

American college football season

2022 Yale Bulldogs football

Ivy League champion
- Conference: Ivy League
- Record: 8–2 (6–1 Ivy)
- Head coach: Tony Reno (10th season)
- Offensive coordinator: Kevin Cahill (4th season)
- Offensive scheme: Pro spread
- Defensive coordinator: Sean McGowan (5th season)
- Base defense: 4–2–5
- Home stadium: Yale Bowl

2022 Ivy League football standings
	Conf.			Overall
Team	W		L	W		L
Yale $	6	–	1	8	–	2
Penn	5	–	2	8	–	2
Princeton	5	–	2	8	–	2
Harvard	4	–	3	6	–	4
Columbia	3	–	4	6	–	4
Cornell	2	–	5	5	–	5
Dartmouth	2	–	5	3	–	7
Brown	1	–	6	3	–	7
$ – Conference champion; Rankings from STATS Poll

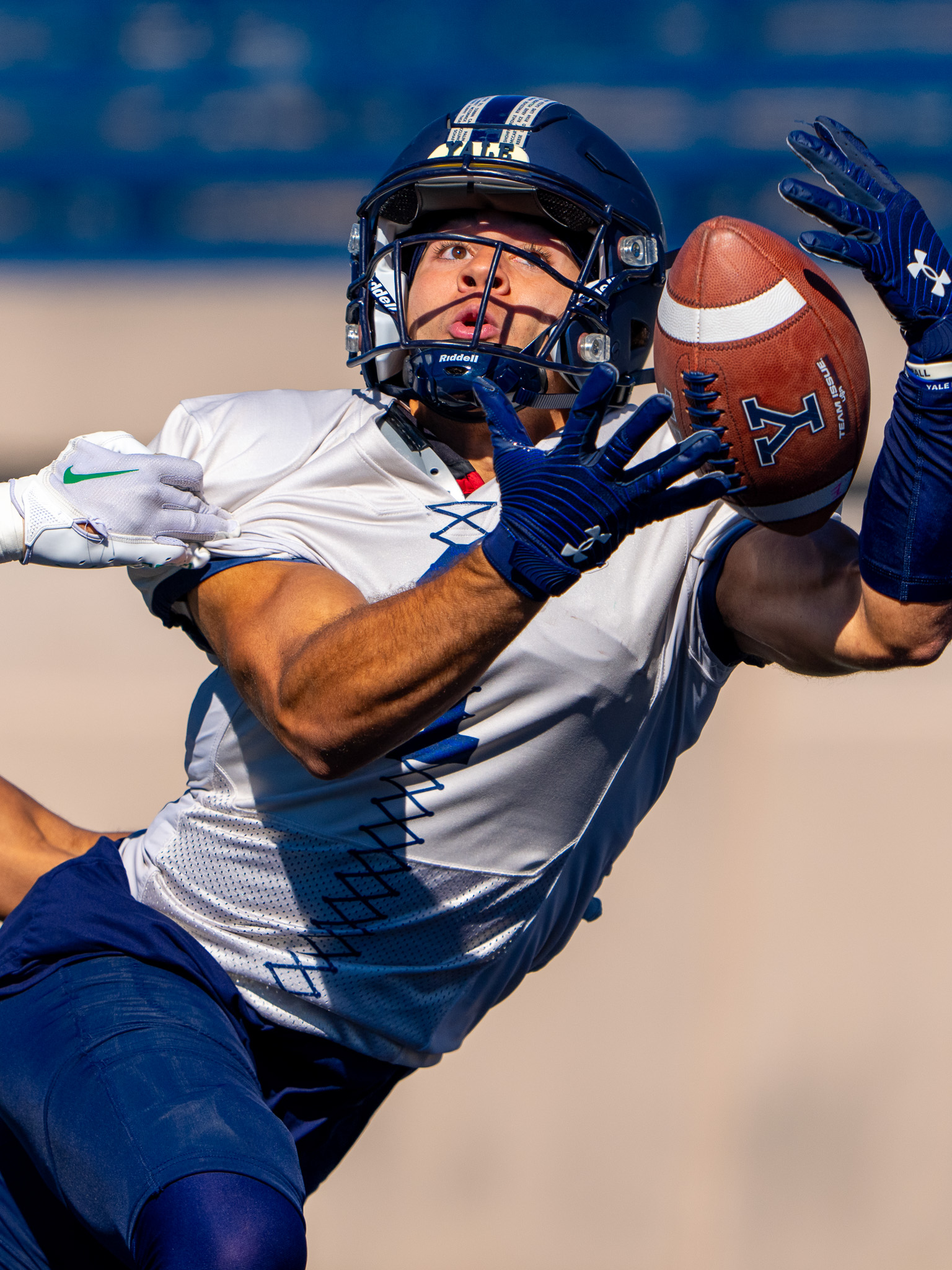
Mason Tipton catches a touchdown during the Dartmouth game

The 2022 Yale Bulldogs football team represented Yale University as a member of the Ivy League during the 2022 NCAA Division I FCS football season. The team was led by tenth-year head coach Tony Reno and played its home games at the Yale Bowl.

== Schedule ==
Date	Time	Opponent	Site	TV	Result	Attendance
September 17	2:00 p.m.	at No. 13 Holy Cross*	Fitton Field; Worcester, MA	ESPN+	L 14–38	13,847
September 24	2:00 p.m.	at Cornell	Schoellkopf Field; Ithaca, NY	ESPN+	W 38–14	14,821
October 1	12:00 p.m.	Howard*	Yale Bowl; New Haven, CT	ESPN+	W 34–26	9,200
October 8	12:00 p.m.	Dartmouth	Yale Bowl; New Haven, CT	ESPN+	W 24–21	6,300
October 15	12:00 p.m.	Bucknell*	Yale Bowl; New Haven, CT	ESPN+	W 29–9	3,995
October 22	1:00 p.m.	at Penn	Franklin Field; Philadelphia, PA	ESPN+	L 13–20	11,972
October 28	6:30 p.m.	at Columbia	Robert K. Kraft Field at Lawrence A. Wien Stadium; New York, NY	ESPNU	W 41–16	3,551
November 5	12:00 p.m.	Brown	Yale Bowl; New Haven, CT	ESPN+	W 69–17	4,500
November 12	12:00 p.m.	No. 24 Princeton	Yale Bowl; New Haven, CT (rivalry)	ESPN+	W 24–20	7,500
November 19	12:00 p.m.	at Harvard	Harvard Stadium; Boston, MA (rivalry)	ESPNU	W 19–14	30,006
*Non-conference game; Rankings from STATS Poll released prior to the game; All times are in Eastern time

== Game summaries ==
=== At No. 13 Holy Cross ===
	1	2	3	4	Total
Bulldogs	0	7	0	7	14
No. 13 Crusaders	0	21	14	3	38

=== At Cornell ===
	1	2	3	4	Total
Bulldogs	14	14	10	0	38
Big Red	7	0	0	7	14

=== Howard ===
	1	2	3	4	Total
Bison	3	3	7	13	26
Bulldogs	0	17	10	7	34

=== Dartmouth ===
	1	2	3	4	Total
Big Green	7	0	0	14	21
Bulldogs	0	10	14	0	24

=== Bucknell ===
	1	2	3	4	Total
Bison	3	0	6	0	9
Bulldogs	0	7	9	13	29

=== At Penn ===
	1	2	3	4	Total
Bulldogs	0	10	0	3	13
Quakers	3	7	3	7	20

=== At Columbia ===
	1	2	3	4	Total
Bulldogs	7	17	0	17	41
Lions	3	13	0	0	16

=== Brown ===
	1	2	3	4	Total
Bears	0	3	7	7	17
Bulldogs	17	35	14	3	69

=== No. 24 Princeton ===
	1	2	3	4	Total
No. 24 Tigers	0	14	0	6	20
Bulldogs	0	7	17	0	24

=== At Harvard ===
	1	2	3	4	Total
Bulldogs	7	3	3	6	19
Crimson	0	7	0	7	14
