= 2022 Fordham Rams football team =

American college football season

2022 Fordham Rams football

NCAA Division I First Round, L 42–52 at New Hampshire
- Conference: Patriot League

Ranking
- STATS: No. 22
- FCS Coaches: No. 16
- Record: 9–3 (5–1 Patriot)
- Head coach: Joe Conlin (5th season)
- Offensive coordinator: Kevin Decker (4th season)
- Defensive coordinator: Mark Powell (1st season)
- Home stadium: Coffey Field

2022 Patriot League football standings
	Conf.			Overall
Team	W		L	W		L
No. 6 Holy Cross $^	6	–	0	12	–	1
No. 22 Fordham ^	5	–	1	9	–	3
Lafayette	3	–	3	4	–	7
Bucknell	2	–	4	3	–	8
Colgate	2	–	4	3	–	8
Lehigh	2	–	4	2	–	9
Georgetown	1	–	5	2	–	9
$ – Conference champion; ^ – FCS playoff participant; Rankings from STATS Poll

The 2022 Fordham Rams football team represented Fordham University as a member of the Patriot League during the 2022 NCAA Division I FCS football season. Led by fifth-year head coach Joe Conlin, the Rams compiled an overall record of 9–3 with a mark of 5–1 in conference play, placing second in the Patriot League. Fordham received an at-large bid to the NCAA Division I Football Championship playoffs, where the Rams lost in the first round to New Hampshire. The team played home games at Coffey Field in The Bronx.

== Schedule ==
Date	Time	Opponent	Rank	Site	TV	Result	Attendance
September 1	6:00 p.m.	at Wagner*		Wagner College Stadium; Staten Island, NY	NEC Front Row	W 48–31	3,000
September 10	1:00 p.m.	at Monmouth*		Kessler Stadium; West Long Branch, NJ	SNY/FloSports	W 52–49	2,785
September 17	1:00 p.m.	Albany*^{†}		Coffey Field; Bronx, NY	SNY/ESPN+	W 48–45	5,000
September 24	2:00 p.m.	at Ohio*		Peden Stadium; Athens, OH	ESPN+	L 52–59	19,024
October 1	1:00 p.m.	Georgetown		Coffey Field; Bronx, NY	ESPN+	W 59–38	4,417
October 8	Noon	at Lehigh		Goodman Field; Bethlehem, PA	ESPN+	W 40–28	3,221
October 15	6:00 p.m.	Stony Brook*	No. 22	Coffey Field; Bronx, NY	SNY/ESPN+	W 45–14	1,914
October 29	1:00 p.m.	at No. T–5 Holy Cross	No. 22	Fitton Field; Worcester, MA (Ram–Crusader Cup)	ESPN+	L 52–53 ^{OT}	17,592
November 5	1:00 p.m.	at Bucknell	No. 24	Christy Mathewson–Memorial Stadium; Lewisburg, PA	ESPN+	W 59–17	1,324
November 12	1:00 p.m.	Lafayette	No. 23	Coffey Field; Bronx, NY	ESPN+/SNY	W 45–10	2,020
November 19	1:00 p.m.	Colgate	No. T–21	Coffey Field; Bronx, NY	ESPN+	W 52–38	2,000
November 26	2:00 p.m.	at No. 15 New Hampshire*	No. 16	Wildcat Stadium; Durham, NH (NCAA Division I First Round)	ESPN+	L 42–52	2,989
*Non-conference game; ^{†}Homecoming; Rankings from STATS Poll released prior to the game; All times are in Eastern time

== Game summaries ==
=== At Wagner ===
	1	2	3	4	Total
Rams	7	7	20	14	48
Seahawks	7	14	7	3	31

=== At Monmouth ===
	1	2	3	4	Total
Rams	7	21	10	14	52
Hawks	20	6	9	14	49

=== Albany ===
	1	2	3	4	Total
Great Danes	0	24	14	7	45
Rams	10	7	10	21	48

=== At Ohio ===
	1	2	3	4	Total
Rams	0	21	28	3	52
Bobcats	14	17	7	21	59

=== Georgetown ===
	1	2	3	4	Total
Hoyas	21	0	3	14	38
Rams	7	28	10	14	59

=== At Lehigh ===
	1	2	3	4	Total
Rams	14	3	17	6	40
Mountain Hawks	14	7	0	7	28

=== Stony Brook ===
	1	2	3	4	Total
Seawolves	0	0	0	14	14
No. 22 Rams	7	24	0	14	45

=== At No. 5т Holy Cross ===
	1	2	3	4	OT	Total
No. 22 Rams	10	14	7	14	7	52
No. 5т Crusaders	14	7	7	17	8	53

=== At Bucknell ===
	1	2	3	4	Total
No. 24 Rams	0	24	7	28	59
Bison	3	0	7	7	17

=== Lafayette ===
	1	2	3	4	Total
Leopards	0	3	7	0	10
No. 23 Rams	10	14	14	7	45

=== Colgate ===
	1	2	3	4	Total
Raiders	10	14	0	14	38
No. 21т Rams	14	14	10	14	52

== FCS Playoffs ==
=== At No. 15 New Hampshire – first round ===
	1	2	3	4	Total
No. 16 Rams	7	14	7	14	42
No. 15 Wildcats	21	7	14	10	52
