= 2022 Lafayette Leopards football team =

American college football season

2022 Lafayette Leopards football
- Conference: Patriot League
- Record: 4–7 (3–3 Patriot)
- Head coach: John Troxell (1st season)
- Offensive coordinator: T. J. Dimuzio (1st season)
- Defensive coordinator: Mike Saint Germain (1st season)
- Home stadium: Fisher Stadium

2022 Patriot League football standings
	Conf.			Overall
Team	W		L	W		L
No. 6 Holy Cross $^	6	–	0	12	–	1
No. 22 Fordham ^	5	–	1	9	–	3
Lafayette	3	–	3	4	–	7
Bucknell	2	–	4	3	–	8
Colgate	2	–	4	3	–	8
Lehigh	2	–	4	2	–	9
Georgetown	1	–	5	2	–	9
$ – Conference champion; ^ – FCS playoff participant; Rankings from STATS Poll

The 2022 Lafayette Leopards football team represented Lafayette College as a member of the Patriot League during the 2022 NCAA Division I FCS football season. The Leopards, led by first-year head coach John Troxell, played their home games at Fisher Stadium.

== Schedule ==
Date	Time	Opponent	Site	TV	Result	Attendance
September 3	12:30 p.m.	Sacred Heart*	Fisher Stadium; Easton, PA	ESPN+	W 6–0	5,255
September 10	2:00 p.m.	at Temple*	Lincoln Financial Field; Philadelphia, PA	ESPN+	L 14–30	18,430
September 17	3:30 p.m.	No. 15 William & Mary*	Fisher Stadium; Easton, PA	ESPN+	L 7–34	5,244
September 24	1:00 p.m.	at Penn*	Franklin Field; Philadelphia, PA (Rivalry)	ESPN+	L 0–12	2,122
October 1	3:30 p.m.	at Bucknell	Christy Mathewson–Memorial Stadium; Lewisburg, PA (rivalry)	ESPN+	W 24–14	1,370
October 8	12:30 p.m.	Princeton*	Fisher Stadium; Easton, PA	ESPN+	L 2–23	3,303
October 22	3:30 p.m.	No. 6 Holy Cross^{†}	Fisher Stadium; Easton, PA	ESPN+	L 21–24	4,363
October 29	12:30 p.m.	Georgetown	Fisher Stadium; Easton, PA	ESPN+	L 20–30	3,374
November 5	1:00 p.m.	at Colgate	Crown Field at Andy Kerr Stadium; Hamilton, NY	ESPN+	W 21–16	2,175
November 12	1:00 p.m.	at No. 23 Fordham	Coffey Field; Bronx, NY	ESPN+	L 10–45	2,020
November 19	12:30 p.m.	Lehigh	Fisher Stadium; Easton, PA (The Rivalry)	ESPN+	W 14–11	11,882
*Non-conference game; ^{†}Homecoming; Rankings from STATS Poll released prior to the game; All times are in Eastern time
