= 2022 Holy Cross Crusaders football team =

American college football season

2022 Holy Cross Crusaders football

Patriot League champion Lambert Cup winner

FCS Playoffs Quarterfinal, L 21–42 vs. South Dakota State
- Conference: Patriot League

Ranking
- STATS: No. 6
- FCS Coaches: No. 6
- Record: 12–1 (6–0 Patriot)
- Head coach: Bob Chesney (5th season)
- Offensive coordinator: Chris Smith (1st season)
- Offensive scheme: Multiple
- Defensive coordinator: Scott James (5th season)
- Base defense: 4–3
- Home stadium: Fitton Field

2022 Patriot League football standings
	Conf.			Overall
Team	W		L	W		L
No. 6 Holy Cross $^	6	–	0	12	–	1
No. 22 Fordham ^	5	–	1	9	–	3
Lafayette	3	–	3	4	–	7
Bucknell	2	–	4	3	–	8
Colgate	2	–	4	3	–	8
Lehigh	2	–	4	2	–	9
Georgetown	1	–	5	2	–	9
$ – Conference champion; ^ – FCS playoff participant; Rankings from STATS Poll

The 2022 Holy Cross Crusaders football team represented the College of the Holy Cross as a member of the Patriot League during the 2022 NCAA Division I FCS football season. The Crusaders were led by fifth-year head coach Bob Chesney.

== Schedule ==
Date	Time	Opponent	Rank	Site	TV	Result	Attendance
September 2	7:00 p.m.	at Merrimack*	No. 16	Duane Stadium; North Andover, MA	NEC Front Row	W 31–17	8,147
September 10	6:00 p.m.	at Buffalo*	No. 15	University at Buffalo Stadium; Amherst, NY	ESPN+	W 37–31	16,933
September 17	2:00 p.m.	Yale*	No. 13	Fitton Field; Worcester, MA	ESPN+	W 38–14	13,847
September 24	1:00 p.m.	at Colgate	No. 13	Crown Field at Andy Kerr Stadium; Hamilton, NY	ESPN+	W 35–10	3,327
October 1	1:00 p.m.	at Harvard*	No. 10	Harvard Stadium; Boston, MA	ESPN+	W 30–21	7,726
October 8	4:00 p.m.	Bucknell	No. 9	Polar Park; Worcester, MA	ESPN+	W 57–0	7,658
October 22	3:30 p.m.	at Lafayette	No. 6	Fisher Stadium; Easton, PA	ESPN+	W 24–21	4,363
October 29	1:00 p.m.	No. 22 Fordham	No. T–5	Fitton Field; Worcester, MA (Ram–Crusader Cup)	ESPN+	W 53–52 ^{OT}	17,592
November 5	12:00 p.m.	Lehigh	No. 6	Fitton Field; Worcester, MA	ESPN+	W 42–14	11,171
November 12	12:00 p.m.	Bryant*	No. 5	Fitton Field; Worcester, MA	ESPN+	W 36–29	9,217
November 19	12:30 p.m.	at Georgetown	No. 6	Cooper Field; Washington, DC	ESPN+	W 47–10	2,269
December 3	12:00 p.m.	No. 15 New Hampshire*	No. 7	Fitton Field; Worcester, MA (NCAA Division I Second Round)	ESPN+	W 35–19	6,265
December 10	12:00 p.m.	at No. 1 South Dakota State*	No. 7	Dana J. Dykhouse Stadium; Brookings, SD (NCAA Division I Quarterfinal)	ESPN/ESPN+	L 21–42	6,549
*Non-conference game; Rankings from STATS Poll released prior to the game; All times are in Eastern time

== Game summaries ==
=== At Merrimack ===
	1	2	3	4	Total
No. 16 Crusaders	10	9	5	7	31
Warriors	3	7	0	7	17

=== At Buffalo ===
	1	2	3	4	Total
No. 15 Crusaders	0	14	14	9	37
Bulls	7	14	7	3	31

=== Yale ===
	1	2	3	4	Total
Bulldogs	0	7	0	7	14
No. 13 Crusaders	0	21	14	3	38

=== At Colgate ===
	1	2	3	4	Total
No. 13 Crusaders	7	7	14	7	35
Raiders	0	10	0	0	10

=== At Harvard ===
	1	2	3	4	Total
No. 10 Crusaders	7	10	7	6	30
Crimson	7	7	7	0	21

=== Bucknell ===
	1	2	3	4	Total
Bison	0	0	0	0	0
No. 9 Crusaders	21	16	13	7	57

=== At Lafayette ===
	1	2	3	4	Total
No. 6 Crusaders	7	10	0	7	24
Leopards	0	7	7	7	21

=== No. 22 Fordham ===
	1	2	3	4	OT	Total
No. 22 Rams	10	14	7	14	7	52
No. 5т Crusaders	14	7	7	17	8	53

=== Lehigh ===
	1	2	3	4	Total
Mountain Hawks	0	7	7	0	14
No. 6 Crusaders	7	14	14	7	42

=== Bryant ===
	1	2	3	4	Total
Bulldogs	0	0	12	17	29
No. 5 Crusaders	12	10	7	7	36

=== At Georgetown ===
	1	2	3	4	Total
No. 6 Crusaders	14	20	7	6	47
Hoyas	7	3	0	0	10

== FCS Playoffs ==
=== No. 15 New Hampshire – second round ===
	1	2	3	4	Total
No. 15 Wildcats	2	3	6	8	19
No. 7 Crusaders	7	0	14	14	35

=== At No. 1 South Dakota State – Quarterfinals ===
	1	2	3	4	Total
No. 7 Crusaders	7	7	7	0	21
No. 1 Jackrabbits	6	15	0	21	42
