= 2022 Cornell Big Red football team =

American college football season

2022 Cornell Big Red football
- Conference: Ivy League
- Record: 5–5 (2–5 Ivy)
- Head coach: David Archer (9th season)
- Offensive coordinator: Joe Villapiano (5th season)
- Defensive coordinator: Jared Backus (9th season)
- Home stadium: Schoellkopf Field

2022 Ivy League football standings
| | Conf. | | | Overall |
| Team | W | | L | W | | L |
|---|---|---|---|---|---|---|
| Yale $ | 6 | – | 1 | 8 | – | 2 |
| Penn | 5 | – | 2 | 8 | – | 2 |
| Princeton | 5 | – | 2 | 8 | – | 2 |
| Harvard | 4 | – | 3 | 6 | – | 4 |
| Columbia | 3 | – | 4 | 6 | – | 4 |
| Cornell | 2 | – | 5 | 5 | – | 5 |
| Dartmouth | 2 | – | 5 | 3 | – | 7 |
| Brown | 1 | – | 6 | 3 | – | 7 |
$ – Conference champion; Rankings from STATS Poll

The 2022 Cornell Big Red football team represented Cornell University as a member of the Ivy League during the 2022 NCAA Division I FCS football season. The team was led by ninth-year head coach David Archer and played its home games at Schoellkopf Field.

== Schedule ==
| Date | Time | Opponent | Site | TV | Result | Attendance |
|---|---|---|---|---|---|---|
| September 17 | 1:30 p.m. | at VMI* | Alumni Memorial Field; Lexington, VA | ESPN+ | W 28–22 | 5,074 |
| September 24 | 2:00 p.m. | Yale^{†} | Schoellkopf Field; Ithaca, NY | ESPN+ | L 14–38 | 14,821 |
| October 1 | 1:00 p.m. | at Colgate* | Crown Field at Andy Kerr Stadium; Hamilton, NY (rivalry) | ESPN+ | W 34–31 | 2,432 |
| October 7 | 7:00 p.m. | Harvard | Schoellkopf Field; Ithaca, NY | ESPNU | L 28–35 | 4,205 |
| October 15 | 1:00 p.m. | Lehigh* | Schoellkopf Field; Ithaca, NY | ESPN+ | W 19–15 | 5,138 |
| October 22 | 12:30 p.m. | at Brown | Richard Gouse Field at Brown Stadium; Providence, RI | ESPN+ | W 24–21 | 4,386 |
| October 29 | 1:00 p.m. | at Princeton | Powers Field at Princeton Stadium; Princeton, NJ | ESPN+ | L 9–35 | 7,652 |
| November 5 | 1:00 p.m. | Penn | Schoellkopf Field; Ithaca, NY (rivalry) | ESPN+ | L 21–28 | 6,012 |
| November 12 | 1:00 p.m. | Dartmouth | Schoellkopf Field; Ithaca, NY (rivalry) | ESPN+ | W 17–13 | 4,212 |
| November 19 | 1:00 p.m. | at Columbia | Robert K. Kraft Field at Lawrence A. Wien Stadium; New York, NY (rivalry) | ESPN+ | L 22–45 | 3,672 |
*Non-conference game; ^{†}Homecoming; All times are in Eastern time

== Game summaries ==
=== VMI ===
| | 1 | 2 | 3 | 4 | Total |
|---|---|---|---|---|---|
| Big Red | 7 | 14 | 7 | 0 | 28 |
| Keydets | 2 | 0 | 0 | 20 | 22 |

=== Yale ===
| | 1 | 2 | 3 | 4 | Total |
|---|---|---|---|---|---|
| Bulldogs | 14 | 14 | 10 | 0 | 38 |
| Big Red | 7 | 0 | 0 | 7 | 14 |

=== At Colgate ===
| | 1 | 2 | 3 | 4 | Total |
|---|---|---|---|---|---|
| Big Red | 7 | 14 | 3 | 10 | 34 |
| Raiders | 7 | 6 | 18 | 0 | 31 |

=== Harvard ===
| | 1 | 2 | 3 | 4 | Total |
|---|---|---|---|---|---|
| Crimson | 0 | 13 | 7 | 15 | 35 |
| Big Red | 7 | 0 | 7 | 14 | 28 |

=== Lehigh ===
| | 1 | 2 | 3 | 4 | Total |
|---|---|---|---|---|---|
| Mountain Hawks | 6 | 9 | 0 | 0 | 15 |
| Big Red | 7 | 3 | 6 | 3 | 19 |

=== At Brown ===
| | 1 | 2 | 3 | 4 | Total |
|---|---|---|---|---|---|
| Big Red | 7 | 10 | 0 | 7 | 24 |
| Bears | 0 | 7 | 7 | 7 | 21 |

=== At Princeton ===
| | 1 | 2 | 3 | 4 | Total |
|---|---|---|---|---|---|
| Big Red | 0 | 3 | 6 | 0 | 9 |
| Tigers | 0 | 12 | 9 | 14 | 35 |

=== Penn ===
| | 1 | 2 | 3 | 4 | Total |
|---|---|---|---|---|---|
| Quakers | 7 | 14 | 7 | 0 | 28 |
| Big Red | 7 | 0 | 7 | 7 | 21 |

=== Dartmouth ===
| | 1 | 2 | 3 | 4 | Total |
|---|---|---|---|---|---|
| Big Green | 0 | 6 | 7 | 0 | 13 |
| Big Red | 0 | 7 | 7 | 3 | 17 |

=== At Columbia ===
| | 1 | 2 | 3 | 4 | Total |
|---|---|---|---|---|---|
| Big Red | 0 | 7 | 0 | 15 | 22 |
| Lions | 7 | 7 | 14 | 17 | 45 |
