= 2022 Columbia Lions football team =

American college football season

2022 Columbia Lions football
- Conference: Ivy League
- Record: 6–4 (3–4 Ivy)
- Head coach: Al Bagnoli (7th season)
- Offensive coordinator: Mark Fabish (8th season)
- Defensive coordinator: Justin Stovall (1st season)
- Home stadium: Robert K. Kraft Field at Lawrence A. Wien Stadium

2022 Ivy League football standings
	Conf.			Overall
Team	W		L	W		L
Yale $	6	–	1	8	–	2
Penn	5	–	2	8	–	2
Princeton	5	–	2	8	–	2
Harvard	4	–	3	6	–	4
Columbia	3	–	4	6	–	4
Cornell	2	–	5	5	–	5
Dartmouth	2	–	5	3	–	7
Brown	1	–	6	3	–	7
$ – Conference champion; Rankings from STATS Poll

The 2022 Columbia Lions football team represented Columbia University as a member of the Ivy League during the 2022 NCAA Division I FCS football season. The team was led by seventh-year head coach Al Bagnoli and played its home games at Robert K. Kraft Field at Lawrence A. Wien Stadium.

== Schedule ==
Date	Time	Opponent	Site	TV	Result	Attendance
September 17	6:00 p.m.	at Marist*	Tenney Stadium at Leonidoff Field; Poughkeepsie, NY	ESPN3	W 38–3	1,643
September 24	12:30 p.m.	at Georgetown*	Cooper Field; Washington, D.C.		W 42–6	2,169
October 1	1:00 p.m.	Princeton	Robert K. Kraft Field at Lawrence A. Wien Stadium; New York, NY	ESPN+	L 6–24	4,071
October 8	1:00 p.m.	Wagner*	Robert K. Kraft Field at Lawrence A. Wien Stadium; New York, NY	ESPN+	W 28–7	3,125
October 15	1:00 p.m.	at Penn	Franklin Field; Philadelphia, PA	ESPN+	L 14–34	5,127
October 22	1:30 p.m.	Dartmouth^{†}	Robert K. Kraft Field at Lawrence A. Wien Stadium; New York, NY	ESPN+	L 24–27	11,023
October 28	6:30 p.m.	Yale	Robert K. Kraft Field at Lawrence A. Wien Stadium; New York, NY	ESPNU	L 16–41	3,551
November 5	1:00 p.m.	at Harvard	Harvard Stadium; Boston, MA	ESPN+	W 21–20	13,972
November 12	12:00 p.m.	at Brown	Richard Gouse Field at Brown Stadium; Providence, RI	ESPN+	W 31–24	2,350
November 19	1:00 p.m.	Cornell	Robert K. Kraft Field at Lawrence A. Wien Stadium; New York, NY (rivalry)	ESPN+	W 45–22	3,672
*Non-conference game; ^{†}Homecoming; All times are in Eastern time

== Game summaries ==
=== At Marist ===
	1	2	3	4	Total
Lions	21	10	7	0	38
Red Foxes	0	0	0	3	3

=== At Georgetown ===
	1	2	3	4	Total
Lions	0	13	7	22	42
Hoyas	0	0	6	0	6

=== Princeton ===
	1	2	3	4	Total
Tigers	7	7	7	3	24
Lions	6	0	0	0	6

=== Wagner ===
	1	2	3	4	Total
Seahawks	0	0	0	7	7
Lions	0	7	14	7	28

=== At Penn ===
	1	2	3	4	Total
Lions	0	0	7	7	14
Quakers	10	14	10	0	34

=== Dartmouth ===
	1	2	3	4	Total
Big Green	7	7	10	3	27
Lions	3	6	8	7	24

=== Yale ===
	1	2	3	4	Total
Bulldogs	7	17	0	17	41
Lions	3	13	0	0	16

=== At Harvard ===
	1	2	3	4	Total
Lions	0	10	3	8	21
Crimson	7	10	3	0	20

=== At Brown ===
	1	2	3	4	OT	Total
Lions	0	21	0	3	7	31
Bears	0	7	7	10	0	24

=== Cornell ===
	1	2	3	4	Total
Big Red	0	7	0	15	22
Lions	7	7	14	17	45
