= 2022 Georgetown Hoyas football team =

American college football season

2022 Georgetown Hoyas football
- Conference: Patriot League
- Record: 2–9 (1–5 Patriot)
- Head coach: Rob Sgarlata (8th season)
- Offensive coordinator: Rob Spence (4th season)
- Defensive coordinator: Kevin Doherty (5th season)
- Home stadium: Cooper Field

2022 Patriot League football standings
	Conf.			Overall
Team	W		L	W		L
No. 6 Holy Cross $^	6	–	0	12	–	1
No. 22 Fordham ^	5	–	1	9	–	3
Lafayette	3	–	3	4	–	7
Bucknell	2	–	4	3	–	8
Colgate	2	–	4	3	–	8
Lehigh	2	–	4	2	–	9
Georgetown	1	–	5	2	–	9
$ – Conference champion; ^ – FCS playoff participant; Rankings from STATS Poll

The 2022 Georgetown Hoyas football team represented Georgetown University as a member of the Patriot League during the 2022 NCAA Division I FCS football season. Led by eighth-year head coach Rob Sgarlata, the Hoyas compiled an overall record of 2–9 with a mark of 1–5 in conference play, placing last out of seven teams in the Patriot League. Georgetown played home games at Cooper Field in Washington, D.C.

== Schedule ==
Date	Time	Opponent	Site	TV	Result	Attendance
September 3	12:00 p.m.	at Marist*	Tenney Stadium at Leonidoff Field; Poughkeepsie, NY	ESPN+	W 43–12	2,453
September 10	5:00 p.m.	Lehigh	Cooper Field; Washington, DC	ESPN+	L 19–21	2,107
September 17	1:00 p.m.	at Monmouth*	Kessler Stadium; West Long Branch, NJ	FloSports	L 6–45	2,589
September 24	12:30 p.m.	Columbia*	Cooper Field; Washington, DC	ESPN+	L 6–42	2,169
October 1	1:00 p.m.	at Fordham	Coffey Field; Bronx, NY	ESPN+	L 38–59	4,417
October 8	2:00 p.m.	Penn*	Cooper Field; Washington, DC	ESPN+	L 28–59	
October 22	12:00 p.m.	at Colgate	Crown Field at Andy Kerr Stadium; Hamilton, NY	ESPN+	L 24–34	4,883
October 29	12:30 p.m.	at Lafayette	Fisher Stadium; Easton, PA	ESPN+	W 30–20	3,374
November 5	12:30 p.m.	Saint Francis (PA)*	Cooper Field; Washington, DC	ESPN+	L 24–38	1,487
November 12	12:30 p.m.	Bucknell	Cooper Field; Washington, DC	ESPN+	L 21–24	1,967
November 19	12:30 p.m.	No. 6 Holy Cross	Cooper Field; Washington, DC	ESPN+	L 10–47	2,269
*Non-conference game; Rankings from STATS Poll released prior to the game; All times are in Eastern time
