= 2022 Colgate Raiders football team =

American college football season

2022 Colgate Raiders football
- Conference: Patriot League
- Record: 3–8 (2–4 Patriot)
- Head coach: Stan Dakosty (2nd season)
- Offensive coordinator: Brent Bassham (3rd season)
- Defensive coordinator: Jordan Belfiori (1st season)
- Home stadium: Crown Field at Andy Kerr Stadium

2022 Patriot League football standings
	Conf.			Overall
Team	W		L	W		L
No. 6 Holy Cross $^	6	–	0	12	–	1
No. 22 Fordham ^	5	–	1	9	–	3
Lafayette	3	–	3	4	–	7
Bucknell	2	–	4	3	–	8
Colgate	2	–	4	3	–	8
Lehigh	2	–	4	2	–	9
Georgetown	1	–	5	2	–	9
$ – Conference champion; ^ – FCS playoff participant; Rankings from STATS Poll

The 2022 Colgate Raiders football team represented Colgate University as a member of the Patriot League during the 2022 NCAA Division I FCS football season. The Raiders, led by second-year head coach Stan Dakosty, played their home games at Crown Field at Andy Kerr Stadium.

== Schedule ==
Date	Time	Opponent	Site	TV	Result	Attendance
September 3	8:00 p.m.	at Stanford*	Stanford Stadium; Stanford, CA	P12N	L 10–41	26,826
September 10	1:00 p.m.	at Maine*	Alfond Stadium; Orono, ME	FloSports	W 21–18	5,295
September 17	1:00 p.m.	at Penn*	Franklin Field; Philadelphia, PA	ESPN+	L 14–25	4,678
September 24	1:00 p.m.	No. 13 Holy Cross	Crown Field at Andy Kerr Stadium; Hamilton, NY	ESPN+	L 10–35	3,327
October 1	1:00 p.m.	Cornell	Crown Field at Andy Kerr Stadium; Hamilton, NY (rivalry)	ESPN+	L 31–34	2,432
October 15	12:00 p.m.	at Army*	Michie Stadium; West Point, NY	CBSSN	L 17–42	28,896
October 22	12:00 p.m.	Georgetown	Crown Field at Andy Kerr Stadium; Hamilton, NY	ESPN+	W 34–24	4,883
October 29	1:00 p.m.	at Bucknell	Christy Mathewson–Memorial Stadium; Lewisburg, PA	ESPN+	W 13–7	1,164
November 5	1:00 p.m.	Lafayette	Crown Field at Andy Kerr Stadium; Hamilton, NY	ESPN+	L 16–21	2,175
November 12	12:00 p.m.	at Lehigh	Goodman Stadium; Bethlehem, PA	ESPN+	L 33–36	3,526
November 19	1:00 p.m.	at No. T–21 Fordham	Coffey Field; Bronx, NY	ESPN+	L 38–52	
*Non-conference game; Rankings from STATS Poll released prior to the game; All times are in Eastern time

== Game summaries ==
=== At Stanford ===
Colgate Raiders (0–0) vs Stanford Cardinal (0–0) – Game summary

Quarter	1	2	3	4	Total
Raiders	0	7	3	0	10
Cardinal	7	21	0	13	41

at Stanford Stadium • Stanford, CA

- Date: September 3, 2022
- Game time: 8:00 p.m. EST
- Game weather: Sunny, 79 °F (26 °C)
- Game attendance: 26,826
- Referee: Mark Duddy
- TV announcers (Pac-12 Network): Jordan Kent (play-by-play), Greg Camarillo (analyst)

Game information

First quarter

- (14:42) STAN – E. J. Smith 87-yard run, Joshua Karty kick (Drive: 1 play, 87 yards, 0:15; Stanford 7–0)

Second quarter

- (14:48) COLG – Asauni Allen 0-yard fumble return, Spencer Biscoe kick (Drive: 3 plays, 3 yards, 1:48; Tied 7–7)
- (12:49) STAN – Michael Wilson 26-yard pass from Tanner McKee, Joshua Karty kick (Drive: 5 plays, 75 yards, 1:59; Stanford 14–7)
- (6:31) STAN – E. J. Smith 1-yard run, Joshua Karty kick (Drive: 8 plays, 72 yards, 4:20; Stanford 21–7)
- (1:16) STAN – Michael Wilson 13-yard pass from Tanner McKee, Joshua Karty (Drive: 8 plays, 56 yards, 4:14; Stanford 28–10)

Third quarter

- (5:17) COLG – Spencer Biscoe 25-yard field goal (Drive: 8 plays, 47 yards, 3:38; Stanford 28–10)

Fourth quarter

- (14:15) STAN – Casey Filkins 1-yard run, Joshua Karty kick (Drive: 5 plays, 75 yards, 1:56; Stanford 35–10)
- (3:15) STAN – Mudia Reuben 7-yard pass from Ari Patu (Drive: 9 plays, 48 yards, 4:33; Stanford 41–10)

Statistics	COLG	STAN
First downs	11	20
Total yards	218	497
Rushes/yards	39–159	28–169
Passing yards	59	328
Passing: Comp–Att–Int	10–20–1	24–30–1
Time of possession	32:06	27:54

Team	Category	Player	Statistics
Colgate	Passing	Michael Brescia	9/19, 57 yards, INT
Colgate	Rushing	Max Hurleman	12 carries, 65 yards
Colgate	Receiving	Jake Ryan	1 reception, 21 yards
Stanford	Passing	Tanner McKee	22/27, 308 yards, 2 TD, INT
Stanford	Rushing	E. J. Smith	11 carries, 118 yards, 2 TD
Stanford	Receiving	John Humphreys	4 receptions, 88 yards

=== At Maine ===
	1	2	3	4	Total
Raiders	0	7	7	7	21
Black Bears	0	0	3	15	18

=== At Penn ===
	1	2	3	4	Total
Raiders	3	11	0	0	14
Quakers	3	0	12	10	25

=== No. 13 Holy Cross ===
	1	2	3	4	Total
No. 13 Crusaders	7	7	14	7	35
Quakers	0	10	0	0	10

=== Cornell ===
	1	2	3	4	Total
Big Red	7	14	3	10	34
Raiders	7	6	18	0	31

=== At Army ===
	1	2	3	4	Total
Raiders	10	7	0	0	17
Black Knights	14	14	14	0	42

=== Georgetown ===
	1	2	3	4	Total
Hoyas	3	0	14	7	24
Raiders	3	14	10	7	34

=== At Bucknell ===
	1	2	3	4	Total
Raiders	0	6	7	0	13
Bison	0	0	0	7	7

=== Lafayette ===
	1	2	3	4	Total
Leopards	7	14	0	0	21
Bison	0	10	6	0	16

=== At Lehigh ===
	1	2	3	4	Total
Bison	14	6	6	7	33
Mountain Hawks	7	7	7	15	36

=== At No. 21т Fordham ===
	1	2	3	4	Total
Raiders	10	14	0	14	38
No. 21т Rams	14	14	10	14	52
