= 2022 Lehigh Mountain Hawks football team =

American college football season

2022 Lehigh Mountain Hawks football
- Conference: Patriot League
- Record: 2–9 (2–4 Patriot)
- Head coach: Tom Gilmore (4th season)
- Offensive coordinator: Scott Brisson (6th season)
- Defensive coordinator: Mike Kashurba (4th season)
- Home stadium: Goodman Stadium

Uniform
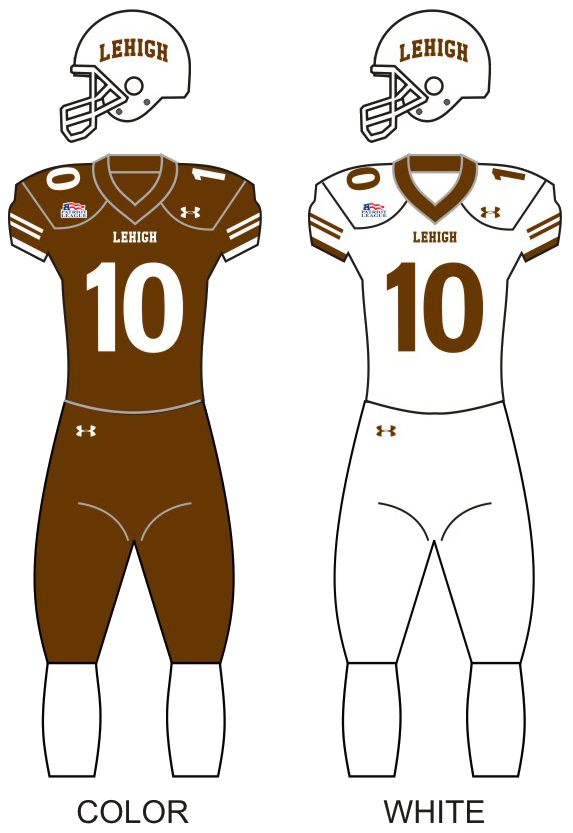

2022 Patriot League football standings
	Conf.			Overall
Team	W		L	W		L
No. 6 Holy Cross $^	6	–	0	12	–	1
No. 22 Fordham ^	5	–	1	9	–	3
Lafayette	3	–	3	4	–	7
Bucknell	2	–	4	3	–	8
Colgate	2	–	4	3	–	8
Lehigh	2	–	4	2	–	9
Georgetown	1	–	5	2	–	9
$ – Conference champion; ^ – FCS playoff participant; Rankings from STATS Poll

The 2022 Lehigh Mountain Hawks football team represented Lehigh University as a member of the Patriot League during the 2022 NCAA Division I FCS football season. The Mountain Hawks, led by fourth-year head coach Tom Gilmore, played their home games at Goodman Stadium. They finished the season 2–9, 2–4 in Patriot League play to finish in a three-way tie for fourth place. Gilmore resigned at the end of the season.

== Schedule ==
Date	Time	Opponent	Site	TV	Result	Attendance
September 2	6:00 p.m.	at No. 6 Villanova*	Villanova Stadium; Villanova, PA	FloSports	L 17–45	6,101
September 10	5:00 p.m.	at Georgetown	Cooper Field; Washington, D.C.	ESPN+	W 21–19	2,107
September 17	12:00 p.m.	Richmond*	Goodman Stadium; Bethlehem, PA	ESPN+	L 6–30	6,178
September 24	1:00 p.m.	at Princeton*	Powers Field at Princeton Stadium; Princeton, NJ	ESPN+	L 17–29	5,560
October 1	12:00 p.m.	Monmouth*	Goodman Stadium; Bethlehem, PA	ESPN+	L 7–35	2,923
October 8	12:00 p.m.	Fordham	Goodman Stadium; Bethlehem, PA	ESPN+	L 28–40	3,221
October 15	1:00 p.m.	at Cornell	Schoellkopf Field; Ithaca, NY	ESPN+	L 15–19	5,138
October 22	12:00 p.m.	Bucknell	Goodman Stadium; Bethlehem, PA	ESPN+	L 17–19	3,582
November 5	12:00 p.m.	at No. 6 Holy Cross	Fitton Field; Worcester, MA	ESPN+	L 14–42	11,171
November 12	12:00 p.m.	Colgate	Goodman Stadium; Bethlehem, PA	ESPN+	W 36–33	3,526
November 19	12:30 p.m.	at Lafayette	Fisher Stadium; Easton, PA (The Rivalry)	ESPN+	L 11–14	11,882
*Non-conference game; Rankings from STATS Poll released prior to the game; All times are in Eastern time

== Game summaries ==
=== At Villanova ===
	1	2	3	4	Total
Mountain Hawks	0	14	3	0	17
Wildcats	3	28	7	7	45

In Lehigh's season opener, the Mountain Hawks lost to the Villanova Wildcats 45-17. The Mountain Hawks entered the second period down 24-0, and launched a comeback attempt through the second and third periods, rebounding to 31-17. However, the Wildcats scored two unanswered touchdowns in the third and fourth quarters to end the game 45-17. Despite the loss, this was one of the best offensive performances of Tom Gilmore's tenure as head coach with the Mountain Hawks putting up 408 total yards of offense and Senior wide receiver Jalen Burbage had a career best performance with 8 catches for 106 yards. Mountain Hawks quarterback, the Junior Dante Perri, went 22 of 38 with two touchdowns and an interception. In a post game interview Gilmore stated he was proud with the offense's performance, but that the game was "a rude awakening" for the defense. This was the tenth straight Villanova win against Lehigh.

=== At Georgetown ===
	1	2	3	4	Total
Mountain Hawks	0	14	7	0	21
Hoyas	3	10	0	6	19

Lehigh's first win came in week two against the Georgetown Hoyas, 21–19. Tom Gilmore credited the win to the Mountain Hawks' running backs, senior Zaythan Hill, sophomore Gaige Garcia, and junior Jack DiPietro, who ran for a combined 169 yards and two rushing touchdowns. In the opening series, quarterback Dante Perri was sacked three times, and throughout the first quarter the Mountain Hawks pass-first offense couldn't score, falling behind the Hoyas 0–10. However, during the second quarter, Hill had a 70-yard run and scored off a one-yard, fourth down play followed next drive by a 5-yard passing touchdown from Perri to junior wide receiver Eric Johnson to go into the locker room up 14–13. Lehigh opened the second half with a 25-yard rushing touchdown from Garcia and stopped the Hoyas on three fourth downs to come away with a win. This win brought the Lehigh-Georgetown record, since the Hoyas joined the Patriot League in 2001, to 19–1.

=== Richmond ===
	1	2	3	4	Total
Spiders	7	13	7	3	30
Mountain Hawks	0	0	6	0	6

Lehigh's home opener saw the Mountain Hawks fall 30–6 behind the Reece Udinski led Richmond Spiders. Richmond had over 400 yards of total offense, 351 of which came from passes from Udinski who went 37–44 with two passing touchdowns. This was the second best offensive performance that Richmond has ever had from a quarterback. Junior linebacker Mike DeNucci said the large gains for Richmond were due to the defense's inconsistencies. Lehigh's Goodman stadium was filled for parents weekend, with most of the school, and their families, coming to see Mountain Hawks fail to stop Richmond on any drive. Lehigh's sole score came at the start of the second half with a one-play 77-yard drive and rushing touchdown from Zaythan Hill, but saw a missed extra point.

=== At Princeton ===
	1	2	3	4	Total
Mountain Hawks	7	3	0	7	17
Tigers	7	3	13	6	29

At Princeton's home opener, the Mountain Hawks lost a close 29–17 game against the Tigers. Lehigh scored on its first drive of the game on a five-yard pass from Dante Perri to Eric Johnson. The game was 10–10 at halftime, but the third quarter saw Lehigh turn the ball over on three of their four possessions which saw Princeton go up 23–10 at the start of the fourth quarter where both teams exchanged touchdowns to finish 29-17. Lehigh's only score in the second half would be a 52-yard interception return by defensive lineman Dean Colton, which would be Princeton's only turnover. Perri finished 13-of-20 for 104 yards with one touchdown and two interceptions. He would be pulled in the final quarter for Freshman Brayten Silbor's career debut, who went 3–6 with 66 yards.

=== Monmouth ===
	1	2	3	4	Total
Hawks	7	14	14	0	35
Mountain Hawks	0	0	7	0	7

The Mountain Hawks suffered a 35–7 rout in week five against the Monmouth Hawks. With seven of their starters injured, Lehigh started by forcing a three-and-out on the first drive, followed by a six play, 20-yard drive of its own, setting the Mountain Hawks up for a 40-yard field goal attempt, which was missed. After Monmouth scored, the second Mountain Hawks drive saw a 53-yard run from Gaige Garcia, which ended in a fumble, turnover, and eventual Hawks touchdown. Dante Perri finished the half 7-13 for just 60 yards, getting sacked three times and was replaced by Brayten Silbor. Silbor's opening drive was promising, going 30 yards before fumbling resulting in another Monmouth touchdown. The Mountain Hawks finally got in the endzone on a one-yard rush by Garcia at the end of the third quarter. Silbor finished 10-22 for 139 yards but Monmouth finished with 485 yards of offense, while holding Lehigh to just 299 yards.

=== Fordham ===
	1	2	3	4	Total
Rams	14	3	17	6	40
Mountain Hawks	14	7	0	7	28

The 1-4 Mountain Hawks would host the 4-1 Fordham Rams and suffer another big loss. Lehigh opened the game with an 89-yard kickoff return by Jalen Burbage, the longest in the Mountain Hawks' history since 2016. The next drive defensive lineman Dean Colton had a scoop and score on a Fordham fumble. Lehigh's defensive performance had them up 21-17 going into the locker room. However, Fordham's offensive mistakes would end in the second half, and Lehigh's offensive failed to keep pace with the Rams. Fordham quarterback Tim DeMorat threw for 499 yards and four touchdowns while Lehigh's Dante Perri threw for just two touchdowns and an interception for a final score of 40-28.

=== At Cornell ===
	1	2	3	4	Total
Mountain Hawks	6	9	0	0	15
Big Red	7	3	6	3	19

Seeking to snap their four game losing streak, the Mountain Hawks played a close game against Cornell's Big Red, ultimately coming up short and losing 15-19. Scoring a field goal on the opening 17-play drive Lehigh's defense forced a three and out and set up another Lehigh possession that also ended in a field goal. A defensive holding call on the next drive saw Cornell score on a ten-yard run to go up 7-6. Lehigh's next drive ended in a missed field goal, and was followed on their next offensive series by a fumble by Dante Perri. After trading field goals, Lehigh's defense forced a fumble, which led to a 13-yard touchdown run from Gaige Garcia ending the half up 15-10. Lehigh would not score in the second half, with the only touchdown being an interception by Perri in the third quarter and another field goal by Cornell in the fourth quarter to bring the game to 19–15 in favor of the Big Red. Lehigh had an opportunity with four minutes left to win the game, but instead suffered a three and out to lose their fifth game in a row.

=== Bucknell ===
	1	2	3	4	Total
Bison	0	7	0	12	19
Mountain Hawks	0	3	7	7	17

Coming into week eight, the Mountain Hawks hosted the winless Bucknell Bisons. Lehigh quarterbacks Dante Perri and Brayten Silbor split time to start the game. Perri led the first two drives of the game. Afterwards Silbor led the next three drives before being carted off the field due to an injury which led to an altercation between the teams. At half the Mountain Hawks where down 3-7 but early in the third Lehigh Senior Johnny Foley blocked a punt recovered by junior Nick Lucien, giving Lehigh a 10–7 lead. Bucknell tied the game early in the fourth quarter and the next Lehigh drive ended with a one-yard Gaige Garcia rushing touchdown. Bucknell then put together a scoring drive of their own but their extra point was blocked giving lehigh a 17–16 lead with 2:05 left in the game. Bucknell then attempted, and recovered, an onside kick and won with a chip-shot 19-yard field goal as time expired. This was the first Bucknell win in 13 games as Lehigh's losing streak continued.

=== At Holy Cross ===
	1	2	3	4	Total
Mountain Hawks	0	7	7	0	14
Crusaders	7	14	14	7	42

Coming out of their bye-week Lehigh played the undefeated Holy Cross Crusaders in Worcester, Massachusetts. To start the game, the Lehigh offense went three and out on three consecutive drives while Holy Cross scored on both of their drives. Dante Perri hit Senior wide receiver Jalen Burbage with a 35-yard touchdown pass on a 4th-and-8 to get the Mountain Hawks first touchdown of the day. Holy Cross took a 21–7 lead into the locker room but their first play of the second half was an interception by Lehigh's Sophomore defensive back Logan Jones. Perri would have a second touchdown pass off a screen to freshman wide receiver Geoffrey Jamiel to cut the lead to 21-14. After a Crusader touchdown, Lehigh's next drive would end in a fumble by Jack DiPietro and another touchdown by the Crusaders. Lehigh's last significant drive ended after the Mountain Hawks failed to convert a 4th-and-1 on the goal line to cut into the 35–14 deficit. Holy Cross would score again to finish the game 42-14. Holy Cross finished with 338 rushing yards, compared to 81 for the Mountain Hawks, and the win allowed the Crusaders to clinch their fourth Patriot League title in a row. After the game Coach Gilmore said overall it wasn't a terrible game as the Mountain Hawks "were a lot closer than the score indicated.”

=== Colgate ===
	1	2	3	4	Total
Raiders	14	6	6	7	33
Mountain Hawks	7	7	7	15	36

The 1 and 8 Mountain Hawks sought a comeback game against the Colgate Raiders as last season the Raiders handily defeated Lehigh 30-3. Colgate came out to a quick 14–0 lead which was met just as quickly by two back-to-back lehigh drives that both culminated in Dante Perri rushing touchdowns. Colgate would also make a pair of field-goals ending the half up 20-14. Colgate opened the second half with a touchdown which was met by Dante Perri throwing to senior wide receiver Jalen Burbage for a score. The scoring stalled at 26-21 Colgate until 3:58 in the fourth quarter when running back Jack DiPietro broke multiple tackles en route to a 17-yard touchdown, giving Lehigh its first lead of the game. Colgate had an answer of their own with 1:15 left. With 22 seconds left, Perri found wide receiver Eric Johnson for an 11-yard game winning touchdown. Finally broke their losing streak with a 36–33 win, Dante Perri completed 25-33 passes for 424 yards and four total touchdowns while Eric Johnson caught 10 passes for 194 yards.

=== At Lafayette ===
	1	2	3	4	Total
Mountain Hawks	0	3	0	8	11
Leopards	14	0	0	0	14

The 2-8 Mountain Hawks traveled to the 3-7 Lafayette Leopards for the 158th meeting of The Rivalry. After a pair of first downs, Lehigh's initial drive stalled out and was forced to punt allowing Lafaytte to score the first points of the game off a 71-yard run. The Leopards extended their lead with a defensive touchdown, as senior linebacker Billy Shaeffer intercepted Perri and took it 50 yards for a pick-six. Lehigh was able to get a field goal late in the second quarter, heading into the locker room down 3-14. The Mountain Hawks prevented the Leopards from scoring any points in the second half. Lehigh's first possession of the half was an 82-yard drive that ended with no points after being backed out of field-goal range by penalties. On the next drive Dante Perri found Jalen Burbage for a 37-yard touchdown, and after a failed two-point conversion, the score was 14-9. With 1:19 left in the game, Lehigh had a chance to put together a game-winning drive, but instead failed to convert on a fourth-down. Lafayette punter Jakob Tresik ran out of the back of the endzone to run out the clock, resulting in a safety and a final score of 14-11. With this loss the rivalry is 80-71-5 in favor of Lafayette. Two days after the loss, Tom Gilmore resigned as the Mountain Hawks head coach finishing 9–27 overall with his best performance being his initial 4–7 season in 2019.
