= 2022 Princeton Tigers football team =

American college football season

2022 Princeton Tigers football
- Conference: Ivy League
- Record: 8–2 (5–2 Ivy)
- Head coach: Bob Surace (12th season)
- Offensive coordinator: Mike Willis (2nd season)
- Offensive scheme: Spread
- Defensive coordinator: Steve Verbit (9th season)
- Base defense: 4–2–5
- Home stadium: Powers Field at Princeton Stadium

2022 Ivy League football standings
	Conf.			Overall
Team	W		L	W		L
Yale $	6	–	1	8	–	2
Penn	5	–	2	8	–	2
Princeton	5	–	2	8	–	2
Harvard	4	–	3	6	–	4
Columbia	3	–	4	6	–	4
Cornell	2	–	5	5	–	5
Dartmouth	2	–	5	3	–	7
Brown	1	–	6	3	–	7
$ – Conference champion; Rankings from STATS Poll

The 2022 Princeton Tigers football team represented Princeton University as a member of the Ivy League during the 2022 NCAA Division I FCS football season. The team was led by 12th-year head coach Bob Surace and played its home games at Powers Field at Princeton Stadium.

== Schedule ==
Date	Time	Opponent	Rank	Site	TV	Result	Attendance
September 17	1:00 p.m.	at Stetson*		Spec Martin Stadium; DeLand, FL	ESPN+	W 39–14	1,692
September 24	3:00 p.m.	Lehigh*		Powers Field at Princeton Stadium; Princeton, NJ	ESPN+	W 29–17	5,560
October 1	1:00 p.m.	at Columbia		Robert K. Kraft Field at Lawrence A. Wien Stadium; New York, NY	ESPN+	W 24–6	4,071
October 8	12:30 p.m.	at Lafayette*		Fisher Stadium; Easton, PA	ESPN+	W 23–2	3,303
October 14	7:00 p.m.	Brown		Powers Field at Princeton Stadium; Princeton, NJ	ESPNU	W 35–19	5,838
October 21	7:00 p.m.	at Harvard		Harvard Stadium; Boston, MA (rivalry)	ESPNU	W 37–10	10,793
October 29	1:00 p.m.	Cornell^{†}		Powers Field at Princeton Stadium; Princeton, NJ	ESPN+	W 35–9	7,652
November 5	1:00 p.m.	Dartmouth	No. 25	Powers Field at Princeton Stadium; Princeton, NJ	ESPN+	W 17–14	6,413
November 12	12:00 p.m.	at Yale	No. 24	Yale Bowl; New Haven, CT (rivalry)	ESPN+	L 20–24	7,500
November 19	1:00 p.m.	Penn		Powers Field at Princeton Stadium; Princeton, NJ (rivalry)	ESPN+	L 19–20	6,028
*Non-conference game; ^{†}Homecoming; Rankings from STATS Poll released prior to the game; All times are in Eastern time

== Game summaries ==
=== At Stetson ===
	1	2	3	4	Total
Tigers	7	15	10	7	39
Hatters	7	7	0	0	14

The Princeton Tigers opened their 2022 season with a commanding 39–14 road victory over the Stetson Hatters on September 17 at Spec Martin Stadium in DeLand, Florida. Princeton outgained Stetson 444–216 in total yardage and held the ball for over 37 minutes of possession time.

Quarterback Blake Stenstrom had a standout debut, completing 23 of 34 passes for 256 yards and rushing for a touchdown. Running back John Volker added two rushing scores as part of a ground game that produced 188 yards.

Defensively, the Tigers recorded three sacks and ten tackles for loss, while holding Stetson to just 67 rushing yards and forcing two turnovers. The victory marked Princeton’s eighth consecutive season-opening win under head coach Bob Surace.

=== Lehigh ===
	1	2	3	4	Total
Mountain Hawks	7	3	0	7	17
Tigers	7	3	13	6	29

Princeton defeated Lehigh, 29–17, in the Tigers’ 2022 home opener at Princeton Stadium on September 24. The two teams entered halftime tied 10–10, but Princeton outscored Lehigh 13–0 in the third quarter to pull ahead.

Princeton quarterback Blake Stenstrom threw for 291 yards and a 65-yard fourth-quarter touchdown pass to Andrei Iosivas, who finished with 7 catches for 115 yards. Kicker Jeffrey Sexton contributed three field goals, including a 44-yarder.

Lehigh quarterback Dante Perri went 13-for-20 for 104 yards with one touchdown and two interceptions before being replaced by freshman Brayten Silbor late in the game. The Mountain Hawks’ only second-half points came from a 52-yard interception return by defensive lineman Dean Colton.

The game was played in front of 5,560 spectators and lasted 3 hours and 13 minutes under clear skies with temperatures around 70 °F.

=== At Columbia ===
	1	2	3	4	Total
Tigers	7	7	7	3	24
Lions	6	0	0	0	6

Princeton defeated Columbia 24–6 on October 1, 2022, at Robert K. Kraft Field at Lawrence A. Wien Stadium in New York City. The Tigers opened the game with an eight-play, 75-yard drive culminating in a 1-yard touchdown run by Ryan Butler. Columbia responded with a defensive score when Aaron Brebnor recovered a fumble and returned it 2 yards for a touchdown; however, the two-point conversion attempt failed, leaving Princeton ahead 7–6.

Princeton extended its lead just before halftime with a 13-yard touchdown pass from Blake Stenstrom to JoJo Hawkins. In the third quarter, Niko Vangarelli added a 2-yard rushing touchdown, and Jeffrey Sexton capped the scoring with a 39-yard field goal in the fourth quarter.

Stenstrom completed 21 of 35 passes for 257 yards, while Dylan Classi led all receivers with 6 catches for 133 yards. The Tigers' defense held Columbia scoreless after the first quarter and intercepted quarterback Joe Green three times.

=== At Lafayette ===
	1	2	3	4	Total
Tigers	7	13	3	0	23
Leopards	0	2	0	0	2

Princeton improved to 4–0 with a 23–2 road victory over Lafayette on October 8, 2022, at Fisher Stadium in Easton, Pennsylvania. The Tigers' defense dominated, holding the Leopards to just 206 total yards and forcing two turnovers.

Running back Ryan Butler scored two rushing touchdowns, including an 8-yard run in the first quarter and a 1-yard run in the second quarter. Niko Vangarelli added a 1-yard touchdown run, and kicker Jeffrey Sexton converted a 27-yard field goal in the third quarter. Lafayette’s only points came from a defensive PAT return by Byron Johnson after a blocked extra point attempt.

Quarterback Blake Stenstrom completed 30 of 40 passes for 290 yards, while wide receiver Andrei Iosivas led all receivers with 10 catches for 150 yards. The Tigers controlled the ball for over 39 minutes and tallied 21 first downs. The game was attended by 3,303 spectators.

=== Brown ===
	1	2	3	4	Total
Bears	3	7	0	9	19
Tigers	7	7	14	7	35

Princeton improved to 5–0 (2–0 Ivy League) with a 35–19 win over Brown on October 14, 2022, at Powers Field at Princeton Stadium. Quarterback Blake Stenstrom threw for 258 yards and three touchdowns, including two to wide receiver Dylan Classi, who finished with a career-high 169 receiving yards on nine catches. Running back Ryan Butler added two rushing touchdowns, including a 49-yard score late in the fourth quarter to seal the victory.

Brown trailed 14–10 at halftime after a 9-yard touchdown pass from Jake Willcox to Wes Rockett was upheld following a replay review. The Bears narrowed the deficit to 28–19 with a 17-yard touchdown pass from Willcox to Allen Smith in the fourth quarter, but Butler's long touchdown run on the ensuing drive put the game out of reach. Willcox finished with 339 passing yards and two touchdowns.

Despite the loss, Brown outgained Princeton 391–368 in total offense and recorded 29 first downs to Princeton’s 19. However, the Bears were unable to overcome the Tigers’ efficient passing attack and key defensive stops.

=== At Harvard ===
	1	2	3	4	Total
Tigers	7	7	14	9	37
Crimson	3	7	0	0	10

Princeton remained unbeaten at 6–0 (3–0 Ivy League) with a 37–10 victory over Harvard on October 21, 2022, at Harvard Stadium in Cambridge, Massachusetts. The Tigers opened the scoring with a 61-yard flea-flicker touchdown pass from quarterback Blake Stenstrom to wide receiver Andrei Iosivas. Harvard answered with a 24-yard field goal by Jonah Lipel to make it 7–3 at the end of the first quarter.

In the second quarter, Stenstrom connected with running back Ryan Butler on a 14-yard touchdown pass, extending Princeton’s lead to 14–3. Harvard responded with a 10-yard touchdown pass from quarterback Charlie Dean to tight end Tyler Neville to cut the lead to 14–10 at halftime.

Princeton dominated the second half, scoring 23 unanswered points. Stenstrom threw a 23-yard touchdown pass to Dylan Classi in the third quarter and added a 4-yard rushing touchdown in the fourth. Ryan Butler also scored on a 1-yard run, and Jeffrey Sexton kicked a 24-yard field goal.

Stenstrom finished with 278 passing yards, two passing touchdowns, and one rushing touchdown. Iosivas led all receivers with 176 yards on nine receptions, while Classi added 92 yards on five catches. The Princeton defense forced two turnovers and held Harvard scoreless in the second half.

=== Cornell ===
	1	2	3	4	Total
Big Red	0	3	6	0	9
Tigers	0	12	9	14	35

=== Dartmouth ===
	1	2	3	4	Total
Big Green	7	0	0	7	14
No. 25 Tigers	14	3	0	0	17

=== At Yale ===
	1	2	3	4	Total
No. 24 Tigers	0	14	0	6	20
Bulldogs	0	7	17	0	24

=== Penn ===
	1	2	3	4	Total
Quakers	0	7	0	13	20
Tigers	6	6	7	0	19

=== All-Ivy honors ===
Following the 2022 regular season, eleven Princeton players were named to the All-Ivy League First and Second Teams, leading all schools in total selections.

First Team All-Ivy

- *Andrei Iosivas* – Wide Receiver (Unanimous selection)
- *Henry Byrd* – Offensive Lineman (Unanimous selection)
- Dylan Classi – Wide Receiver
- Matthew Jester – Defensive Lineman
- *Liam Johnson* – Linebacker (Unanimous selection)
- Michael Ruttlen Jr. – Defensive Back
- CJ Wall – Defensive Back

Second Team All-Ivy

- Jalen Travis – Offensive Lineman
- Blake Stenstrom – Quarterback
- Carson Bobo – Tight End
- Ozzie Nicholas – Linebacker

Honorable Mention All-Ivy

- Connor Scaglione – Offensive Lineman
- Ryan Butler – Running Back (Freshman)
- Uche Ndukwe – Defensive Lineman
- Will Powers – Punter
- AJ Barber – Return Specialist

Academic All-Ivy

- Cole Aubrey – Senior, Defensive Line

*Unanimous selections are noted with an asterisk.
