= 2022 Bucknell Bison football team =

American college football season

2022 Bucknell Bison football
- Conference: Patriot League
- Record: 3–8 (2–4 Patriot)
- Head coach: Dave Cecchini (4th season)
- Offensive coordinator: Jason Miran (4th season)
- Defensive coordinator: Chris Bowers (1st season)
- Home stadium: Christy Mathewson–Memorial Stadium

2022 Patriot League football standings
	Conf.			Overall
Team	W		L	W		L
No. 6 Holy Cross $^	6	–	0	12	–	1
No. 22 Fordham ^	5	–	1	9	–	3
Lafayette	3	–	3	4	–	7
Bucknell	2	–	4	3	–	8
Colgate	2	–	4	3	–	8
Lehigh	2	–	4	2	–	9
Georgetown	1	–	5	2	–	9
$ – Conference champion; ^ – FCS playoff participant; Rankings from STATS Poll

The 2022 Bucknell Bison football team represented Bucknell University as a member of the Patriot League during the 2022 NCAA Division I FCS football season. The Bison, led by fourth-year head coach Dave Cecchini, played their home games at Christy Mathewson–Memorial Stadium.

== Schedule ==
Date	Time	Opponent	Site	TV	Result	Attendance
September 3	6:00 p.m.	Towson*	Christy Mathewson–Memorial Stadium; Lewisburg, PA	ESPN+	L 13–14 ^{OT}	1,949
September 10	1:30 p.m.	at VMI*	Alumni Memorial Field; Lexington, VA	ESPN+	L 14–24	5,000
September 17	1:00 p.m.	at Central Michigan*	Kelly/Shorts Stadium; Mount Pleasant, MI	ESPN3	L 0–41	21,554
October 1	3:30 p.m.	Lafayette	Christy Mathewson–Memorial Stadium; Lewisburg, PA	ESPN+	L 14–24	1,370
October 8	4:00 p.m.	at No. 9 Holy Cross	Polar Park; Worcester, MA	ESPN+	L 0–57	7,658
October 15	12:00 p.m.	at Yale*	Yale Bowl; New Haven, CT	ESPN+	L 9–29	3,995
October 22	12:00 p.m.	at Lehigh	Goodman Stadium; Bethlehem, PA	ESPN+	W 19–17	3,582
October 29	1:00 p.m.	Colgate	Christy Mathewson–Memorial Stadium; Lewisburg, PA	ESPN+	L 7–13	1,164
November 5	1:00 p.m.	No. 24 Fordham	Christy Mathewson–Memorial Stadium; Lewisburg, PA	ESPN+	L 17–59	1,324
November 12	12:30 p.m.	at Georgetown	Cooper Field; Washington, D.C.	ESPN+	W 24–21	1,967
November 19	1:00 p.m.	Marist*	Christy Mathewson–Memorial Stadium; Lewisburg, PA	ESPN+	W 24–13	809
*Non-conference game; Rankings from STATS Poll released prior to the game; All times are in Eastern time

== Game summaries ==
=== Towson ===
	1	2	3	4	OT	Total
Tigers	0	0	7	0	7	14
Bison	0	0	0	7	6	13

=== At VMI ===
	1	2	3	4	Total
Bison	0	0	6	8	14
Keydets	14	7	3	0	24

=== At Central Michigan ===
	1	2	3	4	Total
Bison	0	0	0	0	0
Chippewas	0	7	13	21	41

=== Lafayette ===
	1	2	3	4	Total
Leopards	0	10	7	7	24
Bison	0	6	0	8	14

=== At No. 9 Holy Cross ===
	1	2	3	4	Total
Bison	0	0	0	0	0
No. 9 Crusaders	21	16	13	7	57

=== At Yale ===
	1	2	3	4	Total
Bison	3	0	6	0	9
Bulldogs	0	7	9	13	29

=== At Lehigh ===
	1	2	3	4	Total
Bison	0	7	0	12	19
Mountain Hawks	0	3	7	7	17

=== Colgate ===
	1	2	3	4	Total
Raiders	0	6	7	0	13
Bison	0	0	0	7	7

=== No. 24 Fordham ===
	1	2	3	4	Total
No. 24 Rams	0	24	7	28	59
Bison	3	0	7	7	17

=== At Georgetown ===
	1	2	3	4	OT	Total
Bison	0	3	7	11	3	24
Hoyas	7	0	14	0	0	21

=== Marist ===
	1	2	3	4	Total
Red Foxes	7	6	0	0	13
Bison	3	0	7	14	24
