= 2022 Brown Bears football team =

American college football season

2022 Brown Bears football
- Conference: Ivy League
- Record: 3–7 (1–6 Ivy)
- Head coach: James Perry (3rd season)
- Offensive coordinator: Ryan Mattison (1st season)
- Offensive scheme: Air raid
- Defensive coordinator: Tim Weaver (3rd season)
- Base defense: 3–4
- Home stadium: Richard Gouse Field at Brown Stadium

2022 Ivy League football standings
	Conf.			Overall
Team	W		L	W		L
Yale $	6	–	1	8	–	2
Penn	5	–	2	8	–	2
Princeton	5	–	2	8	–	2
Harvard	4	–	3	6	–	4
Columbia	3	–	4	6	–	4
Cornell	2	–	5	5	–	5
Dartmouth	2	–	5	3	–	7
Brown	1	–	6	3	–	7
$ – Conference champion; Rankings from STATS Poll

The 2022 Brown Bears football team represented Brown University as a member of the Ivy League during the 2022 NCAA Division I FCS football season. Led by third-year head coach James Perry, the Bears compiled an overall record of 3–7 with a mark of 1–6 in conference play, placing last out of eight teams in the Ivy League. Brown played home games at Richard Gouse Field at Brown Stadium in Providence, Rhode Island.

== Schedule ==
Date	Time	Opponent	Site	TV	Result	Attendance
September 17	12:30 p.m.	Bryant*	Richard Gouse Field at Brown Stadium; Providence, RI	ESPN+, NESN+	W 44–38 ^{2OT}	2,044
September 24	12:30 p.m.	Harvard	Richard Gouse Field at Brown Stadium; Providence, RI	ESPN+	L 28–35	9,395
October 1	6:00 p.m.	at Rhode Island*	Meade Stadium; Kingston, RI (rivalry)	FloSports	L 10–38	5,028
October 8	1:00 p.m.	at Central Connecticut*	Arute Field; New Britain, CT	NEC Front Row	W 27–20	3,722
October 14	7:00 p.m.	at Princeton	Powers Field at Princeton Stadium; Princeton, NJ	ESPNU	L 19–35	5,838
October 22	12:30 p.m.	Cornell	Richard Gouse Field at Brown Stadium; Providence, RI	ESPN+	L 21–24	4,386
October 29	12:30 p.m.	Penn	Richard Gouse Field at Brown Stadium; Providence, RI	ESPN+	W 34–31	3,938
November 5	12:00 p.m.	at Yale	Yale Bowl; New Haven, CT	ESPN+	L 17–69	4,500
November 12	12:00 p.m.	Columbia	Richard Gouse Field at Brown Stadium; Providence, RI	ESPN+	L 24–31 ^{OT}	2,350
November 19	1:30 p.m.	at Dartmouth	Memorial Field; Hanover, NH	ESPN+	L 7–30	2,678
*Non-conference game; All times are in Eastern time

== Game summaries ==
=== Bryant ===
	1	2	3	4	OT	2OT	Total
Bulldogs	7	3	14	7	7	0	38
Bears	3	0	7	21	7	6	44

=== Harvard ===
	1	2	3	4	Total
Crimson	7	14	14	0	35
Bears	0	0	7	21	28

=== At Rhode Island ===
	1	2	3	4	Total
Bears	3	0	0	7	10
Rams	17	21	0	0	38

=== At Central Connecticut ===
	1	2	3	4	Total
Bears	7	14	3	3	27
Blue Devils	6	7	0	7	20

=== At Princeton ===
	1	2	3	4	Total
Bears	3	7	0	9	19
Tigers	7	7	14	7	35

=== Cornell ===
	1	2	3	4	Total
Big Red	7	10	0	7	24
Bears	0	7	7	7	21

=== Penn ===
	1	2	3	4	Total
Quakers	0	7	17	7	31
Bears	7	17	0	10	34

=== At Yale ===
	1	2	3	4	Total
Bears	0	3	7	7	17
Bulldogs	17	35	14	3	69

=== Columbia ===
	1	2	3	4	OT	Total
Lions	0	21	0	3	7	31
Bears	0	7	7	10	0	24

=== At Dartmouth ===
	1	2	3	4	Total
Bears	0	0	0	7	7
Big Green	7	13	0	10	30
