= 2022 Penn Quakers football team =

American college football season

2022 Penn Quakers football
- Conference: Ivy League
- Record: 8–2 (5–2 Ivy)
- Head coach: Ray Priore (7th season)
- Offensive coordinator: Dan Swanstrom (1st season)
- Offensive scheme: No-huddle spread option
- Defensive coordinator: Bob Benson (7th season)
- Base defense: 3–3–5
- Home stadium: Franklin Field

2022 Ivy League football standings
	Conf.			Overall
Team	W		L	W		L
Yale $	6	–	1	8	–	2
Penn	5	–	2	8	–	2
Princeton	5	–	2	8	–	2
Harvard	4	–	3	6	–	4
Columbia	3	–	4	6	–	4
Cornell	2	–	5	5	–	5
Dartmouth	2	–	5	3	–	7
Brown	1	–	6	3	–	7
$ – Conference champion; Rankings from STATS Poll

The 2022 Penn Quakers football team represented the University of Pennsylvania as a member of the Ivy League during the 2022 NCAA Division I FCS football season. The team was led by seventh-year head coach Ray Priore and played its home games at Franklin Field.

== Schedule ==
Date	Time	Opponent	Site	TV	Result	Attendance
September 17	1:00 p.m.	Colgate*	Franklin Field; Philadelphia, PA	ESPN+	W 25–14	4,678
September 24	1:00 p.m.	Lafayette*	Franklin Field; Philadelphia, PA	ESPN+/NBCSPHI+	W 12–0	2,122
September 30	7:00 p.m.	at Dartmouth	Memorial Field; Hanover, NH	ESPNU	W 23–17 ^{2OT}	4,767
October 8	2:00 p.m.	at Georgetown*	Cooper Field; Washington, D.C.	ESPN+	W 59–28	0
October 15	1:00 p.m.	Columbia	Franklin Field; Philadelphia, PA	ESPN+	W 34–14	5,127
October 22	1:00 p.m.	Yale^{†}	Franklin Field; Philadelphia, PA	ESPN+/NBCSPHI	W 20–13	11,972
October 29	12:30 p.m.	at Brown	Richard Gouse Field at Brown Stadium; Providence, RI	ESPN+	L 31–34	3,938
November 5	1:00 p.m.	at Cornell	Schoellkopf Field; Ithaca, NY (Rivalry)	ESPN+	W 28–21	6,012
November 12	1:00 p.m.	Harvard	Franklin Field; Philadelphia, PA (rivalry)	ESPN+	L 14–37	10,370
November 19	1:00 p.m.	at Princeton	Powers Field at Princeton Stadium; Princeton, NJ (rivalry)	ESPN+	W 20–19	6,028
*Non-conference game; ^{†}Homecoming; All times are in Eastern time

== Game summaries ==
=== Colgate ===
	1	2	3	4	Total
Raiders	3	11	0	0	14
Quakers	3	0	12	10	25

=== Lafayette ===
	1	2	3	4	Total
Leopards	0	0	0	0	0
Quakers	0	6	6	0	12

=== At Dartmouth ===
	1	2	3	4	OT	2OT	Total
Quakers	7	0	0	3	7	6	23
Big Green	0	3	0	7	7	0	17

=== At Georgetown ===
	1	2	3	4	Total
Quakers	17	7	28	7	59
Hoyas	7	7	14	0	28

=== Columbia ===
	1	2	3	4	Total
Lions	0	0	7	7	14
Quakers	10	14	10	0	34

=== Yale ===
	1	2	3	4	Total
Bulldogs	0	10	0	3	13
Quakers	3	7	3	7	20

=== At Brown ===
	1	2	3	4	Total
Quakers	0	7	17	7	31
Bears	7	17	0	10	34

=== At Cornell ===
	1	2	3	4	Total
Quakers	7	14	7	0	28
Big Red	7	0	7	7	21

=== Harvard ===
	1	2	3	4	Total
Crimson	7	17	10	3	37
Quakers	7	0	7	0	14

=== At Princeton ===
	1	2	3	4	Total
Quakers	0	7	0	13	20
Tigers	6	6	7	0	19
