= Truman Jones =

American football player (born 2000)

No. 56 – Tennessee Titans
- Position: Linebacker
- Roster status: Active

Personal information
- Born: May 13, 2000 (age 26); Boston, Massachusetts, U.S.
- Listed height: 6 ft 3 in (1.91 m)
- Listed weight: 255 lb (116 kg)

Career information
- High school: Westminster (Atlanta, Georgia)
- College: Harvard (2018–2022)
- NFL draft: 2023: undrafted

Career history
- Kansas City Chiefs (2023–2024)*; New England Patriots (2024–2025); Tennessee Titans (2025–present)
- * Offseason or practice squad member only

Awards and highlights
- Super Bowl champion (LVIII); Ivy League Defensive Player of the Year (2023); First team All-Ivy League (2022)

Career NFL statistics as of 2025
- Total tackles: 13
- Sacks: 1.5
- Pass deflections: 1
- Stats at Pro Football Reference

Truman Lamar Jones (born May 13, 2000) is an American professional football linebacker for the Tennessee Titans of the National Football League (NFL). After four seasons of college football with the Harvard Crimson, Jones went undrafted in the 2023 NFL draft.

== Early life ==
Jones grew up in Atlanta, Georgia. He is the son of Archie L. Jones, Jr., an investor and lecturer at Harvard Business School, from which he graduated in 1998. Jones has two brothers. He attended The Westminster Schools for high school, where he was a three-year starter and captain of both the football and the lacrosse teams.

== College career ==
In 2018, Jones began his collegiate career as a defensive end with the Harvard Crimson, seeing three games as a true freshman. At the start of the 2019 season, Jones was moved to defensive end by the coaching staff. In his new position, he recorded 23 total tackles and ranked second in the Ivy League for sacks with 6.5. Jones did not play in 2020, as Ivy League competition halted amid the COVID-19 pandemic. In 2021, Jones suited up in all 10 games for the Crimson, registering 25 tackles. His senior year, Jones was named the 148th captain of the Harvard Crimson football team.

In 2022 as captain, he put up a career high of 40 tackles, with six sacks, three blocked kicks, and a forced fumble. That year, Jones earned numerous honors. He was named unanimously to the first team All-Ivy League and was awarded the Bulger Lowe Award, given to the best defensive player in New England. The Bulger Lowe, named after former NFL player Bulger Lowe, is the nation's second-oldest award in college football, after only the Heisman Trophy. Jones was also named Ivy League Defensive Player of the Year and an Academic All-Ivy recognition. He earned invitation to play in the 2023 Hula Bowl, the nation's top annual college football all-star game.

In December 2022, Jones graduated from Harvard with a degree in biomedical engineering with a plan to attend medical school after his playing career.

== Professional career ==
Pre-draft measurables
Height	Weight	Arm length	Hand span	Wingspan	40-yard dash	10-yard split	20-yard split	20-yard shuttle	Three-cone drill	Vertical jump	Broad jump	Bench press
6 ft 3 1/4 in (1.91 m)	250 lb (113 kg)	33 1/2 in (0.85 m)	10 1/4 in (0.26 m)	6 ft 9 3/8 in (2.07 m)	4.68 s	1.61 s	2.68 s	4.38 s	7.30 s	37.0 in (0.94 m)	10 ft 2 in (3.10 m)	17 reps
All values from Pro Day

=== Kansas City Chiefs ===
Shortly after his graduation, Jones declared for the 2023 NFL draft but went undrafted after being projected a 6th-7th round pick. After the conclusion of the draft, he was signed by the Kansas City Chiefs to a three-year, $2.7 million contact. He was waived on August 27, 2024. He was resigned to the practice squad the next day. Jones was later released from the practice squad on November 26.

=== New England Patriots ===
Jones signed to the practice squad of the New England Patriots on December 3, 2024. On January 4, 2025, prior to the team's Week 18 season finale, Jones was signed off the practice squad to the active roster.

On August 26, 2025, Jones was released by the Patriots as part of final roster cuts. He joined the practice squad the next day. He was elevated from the practice squad to the active roster for their Week 6 matchup against the New Orleans Saints.

=== Tennessee Titans ===
On October 27, 2025, the Tennessee Titans signed Jones to their 53-man roster.
