= List of Big Sky Conference football standings =

This is a list of yearly Big Sky Conference football standings.

== Big Sky standings ==
1963 Big Sky Conference football standings
| | Conf. | | | | | Overall |
| Team | W | | L | | T | W | | L | | T |
|---|---|---|---|---|---|---|---|---|---|---|
| Idaho State $ | 3 | – | 1 | – | 0 | 5 | – | 3 | – | 0 |
| Montana State | 2 | – | 1 | – | 0 | 6 | – | 3 | – | 0 |
| Weber State | 1 | – | 2 | – | 0 | 6 | – | 3 | – | 0 |
| Montana | 0 | – | 3 | – | 0 | 1 | – | 9 | – | 0 |
| Idaho * | 1 | – | 0 | – | 0 | 5 | – | 4 | – | 0 |
$ – Conference champion; * – Insufficient number of games for conference championship

1964 Big Sky Conference football standings
| | Conf. | | | | | Overall |
| Team | W | | L | | T | W | | L | | T |
|---|---|---|---|---|---|---|---|---|---|---|
| Montana State $ | 3 | – | 0 | – | 0 | 7 | – | 4 | – | 0 |
| Idaho State | 2 | – | 1 | – | 0 | 6 | – | 3 | – | 0 |
| Montana | 1 | – | 2 | – | 0 | 3 | – | 6 | – | 0 |
| Weber State | 0 | – | 3 | – | 0 | 2 | – | 6 | – | 0 |
| Idaho * | 0 | – | 0 | – | 0 | 4 | – | 6 | – | 0 |
$ – Conference champion; * – Insufficient number of games for conference championship

1965 Big Sky Conference football standings
| | Conf. | | | | | Overall |
| Team | W | | L | | T | W | | L | | T |
|---|---|---|---|---|---|---|---|---|---|---|
| Weber State + | 3 | – | 1 | – | 0 | 8 | – | 1 | – | 0 |
| Idaho + | 3 | – | 1 | – | 0 | 5 | – | 5 | – | 0 |
| Montana | 2 | – | 2 | – | 0 | 4 | – | 6 | – | 0 |
| Idaho State | 1 | – | 3 | – | 0 | 3 | – | 5 | – | 1 |
| Montana State | 1 | – | 3 | – | 0 | 3 | – | 7 | – | 0 |
+ – Conference co-champions

1966 Big Sky Conference football standings
| | Conf. | | | | | Overall |
| Team | W | | L | | T | W | | L | | T |
|---|---|---|---|---|---|---|---|---|---|---|
| Montana State $^ | 4 | – | 0 | – | 0 | 8 | – | 3 | – | 0 |
| Idaho | 3 | – | 1 | – | 0 | 4 | – | 6 | – | 0 |
| Weber State | 2 | – | 2 | – | 0 | 6 | – | 3 | – | 0 |
| Idaho State | 1 | – | 3 | – | 0 | 3 | – | 6 | – | 0 |
| Montana | 0 | – | 4 | – | 0 | 1 | – | 8 | – | 0 |
$ – Conference champion

1967 Big Sky Conference football standings
| | Conf. | | | | | Overall |
| Team | W | | L | | T | W | | L | | T |
|---|---|---|---|---|---|---|---|---|---|---|
| Montana State $ | 4 | – | 0 | – | 0 | 7 | – | 3 | – | 0 |
| Montana | 2 | – | 2 | – | 0 | 7 | – | 3 | – | 0 |
| Weber State | 2 | – | 2 | – | 0 | 6 | – | 4 | – | 0 |
| Idaho | 2 | – | 2 | – | 0 | 4 | – | 6 | – | 0 |
| Idaho State | 0 | – | 4 | – | 0 | 1 | – | 9 | – | 0 |
$ – Conference champion

1968 Big Sky Conference football standings
| | Conf. | | | | | Overall |
| Team | W | | L | | T | W | | L | | T |
|---|---|---|---|---|---|---|---|---|---|---|
| Weber State + | 3 | – | 1 | – | 0 | 7 | – | 2 | – | 0 |
| Montana State + | 3 | – | 1 | – | 0 | 6 | – | 4 | – | 0 |
| Idaho + | 3 | – | 1 | – | 0 | 5 | – | 5 | – | 0 |
| Idaho State | 1 | – | 3 | – | 0 | 4 | – | 5 | – | 0 |
| Montana | 0 | – | 4 | – | 0 | 2 | – | 7 | – | 0 |
+ – Conference co-champions

1969 Big Sky Conference football standings
| | Conf. | | | | | Overall |
| Team | W | | L | | T | W | | L | | T |
|---|---|---|---|---|---|---|---|---|---|---|
| Montana $ | 4 | – | 0 | – | 0 | 10 | – | 1 | – | 0 |
| Weber State | 3 | – | 1 | – | 0 | 6 | – | 4 | – | 0 |
| Idaho State | 2 | – | 2 | – | 0 | 5 | – | 5 | – | 0 |
| Idaho | 1 | – | 3 | – | 0 | 2 | – | 8 | – | 0 |
| Montana State | 0 | – | 4 | – | 0 | 1 | – | 8 | – | 0 |
$ – Conference champion

1970 Big Sky Conference football standings
| | Conf. | | | | | Overall |
| Team | W | | L | | T | W | | L | | T |
|---|---|---|---|---|---|---|---|---|---|---|
| Montana $ | 5 | – | 0 | – | 0 | 10 | – | 1 | – | 0 |
| Idaho State | 3 | – | 2 | – | 0 | 5 | – | 5 | – | 0 |
| Boise State | 2 | – | 2 | – | 0 | 8 | – | 3 | – | 0 |
| Weber State | 3 | – | 3 | – | 0 | 5 | – | 5 | – | 1 |
| Idaho | 2 | – | 2 | – | 0 | 4 | – | 7 | – | 0 |
| Montana State | 1 | – | 5 | – | 0 | 2 | – | 8 | – | 0 |
| Northern Arizona | 0 | – | 4 | – | 0 | 2 | – | 8 | – | 0 |
$ – Conference champion; Boise State's game against Long Beach State and Northern Arizona's game against New Mexico State counted in the conference standings.

1971 Big Sky Conference football standings
| | Conf. | | | | | Overall |
| Team | W | | L | | T | W | | L | | T |
|---|---|---|---|---|---|---|---|---|---|---|
| Idaho $ | 4 | – | 1 | – | 0 | 8 | – | 3 | – | 0 |
| No. 7 Boise State | 4 | – | 2 | – | 0 | 10 | – | 2 | – | 0 |
| Montana | 3 | – | 2 | – | 0 | 6 | – | 5 | – | 0 |
| Weber State | 3 | – | 2 | – | 1 | 7 | – | 2 | – | 1 |
| Idaho State | 2 | – | 3 | – | 0 | 6 | – | 4 | – | 0 |
| Northern Arizona | 1 | – | 3 | – | 0 | 5 | – | 5 | – | 0 |
| Montana State | 0 | – | 5 | – | 1 | 2 | – | 7 | – | 1 |
$ – Conference champion; Rankings from AP small college poll

1972 Big Sky Conference football standings
| | Conf. | | | | | Overall |
| Team | W | | L | | T | W | | L | | T |
|---|---|---|---|---|---|---|---|---|---|---|
| Montana State $ | 5 | – | 1 | – | 0 | 8 | – | 3 | – | 0 |
| Idaho State | 4 | – | 1 | – | 0 | 7 | – | 3 | – | 0 |
| Boise State | 3 | – | 3 | – | 0 | 7 | – | 4 | – | 0 |
| Montana | 3 | – | 3 | – | 0 | 3 | – | 8 | – | 0 |
| Idaho | 2 | – | 3 | – | 0 | 4 | – | 7 | – | 0 |
| Weber State | 2 | – | 4 | – | 0 | 5 | – | 5 | – | 0 |
| Northern Arizona | 0 | – | 4 | – | 0 | 3 | – | 8 | – | 0 |
$ – Conference champion

1973 Big Sky Conference football standings
| | Conf. | | | | | Overall |
| Team | W | | L | | T | W | | L | | T |
|---|---|---|---|---|---|---|---|---|---|---|
| No. 5 Boise State $^ | 6 | – | 0 | – | 0 | 10 | – | 3 | – | 0 |
| Montana State | 5 | – | 1 | – | 0 | 7 | – | 4 | – | 0 |
| Idaho | 3 | – | 2 | – | 0 | 4 | – | 7 | – | 0 |
| Northern Arizona | 2 | – | 3 | – | 0 | 4 | – | 6 | – | 0 |
| Montana | 2 | – | 4 | – | 0 | 4 | – | 6 | – | 0 |
| Weber State | 2 | – | 4 | – | 0 | 3 | – | 8 | – | 0 |
| Idaho State | 0 | – | 6 | – | 0 | 2 | – | 9 | – | 0 |
$ – Conference champion; ^ – NCAA Division II playoff participant; Idaho was classified as Division I. All the other teams were classified as Division II.; Rankings from AP small college poll

1974 Big Sky Conference football standings
| | Conf. | | | | | Overall |
| Team | W | | L | | T | W | | L | | T |
|---|---|---|---|---|---|---|---|---|---|---|
| No. 5 Boise State $^ | 6 | – | 0 | – | 0 | 10 | – | 2 | – | 0 |
| Montana State | 4 | – | 2 | – | 0 | 7 | – | 3 | – | 0 |
| Idaho | 2 | – | 2 | – | 1 | 2 | – | 8 | – | 1 |
| Montana | 2 | – | 3 | – | 1 | 3 | – | 6 | – | 1 |
| Northern Arizona | 2 | – | 3 | – | 0 | 3 | – | 6 | – | 0 |
| Idaho State | 2 | – | 4 | – | 0 | 5 | – | 5 | – | 0 |
| Weber State | 1 | – | 5 | – | 0 | 4 | – | 7 | – | 0 |
$ – Conference champion; ^ – NCAA Division II playoff participant; Rankings from AP small college poll

1975 Big Sky Conference football standings
| | Conf. | | | | | Overall |
| Team | W | | L | | T | W | | L | | T |
|---|---|---|---|---|---|---|---|---|---|---|
| No. 6 Boise State $^ | 5 | – | 0 | – | 1 | 9 | – | 2 | – | 1 |
| Idaho State | 4 | – | 2 | – | 0 | 7 | – | 3 | – | 0 |
| Montana State | 4 | – | 2 | – | 0 | 5 | – | 5 | – | 0 |
| Idaho | 2 | – | 2 | – | 2 | 4 | – | 5 | – | 2 |
| Montana | 3 | – | 3 | – | 0 | 6 | – | 4 | – | 0 |
| Weber State | 1 | – | 4 | – | 1 | 1 | – | 9 | – | 1 |
| Northern Arizona | 0 | – | 6 | – | 0 | 1 | – | 9 | – | 0 |
$ – Conference champion; ^ – NCAA Division II playoff participant; Rankings from NCAA Division II AP Poll

1976 Big Sky Conference football standings
| | Conf. | | | | | Overall |
| Team | W | | L | | T | W | | L | | T |
|---|---|---|---|---|---|---|---|---|---|---|
| No. 1 Montana State $^ | 6 | – | 0 | – | 0 | 12 | – | 1 | – | 0 |
| Idaho | 5 | – | 1 | – | 0 | 7 | – | 4 | – | 0 |
| Northern Arizona | 4 | – | 2 | – | 0 | 8 | – | 3 | – | 0 |
| Montana | 3 | – | 3 | – | 0 | 4 | – | 6 | – | 0 |
| Boise State | 2 | – | 4 | – | 0 | 5 | – | 5 | – | 1 |
| Weber State | 1 | – | 5 | – | 0 | 2 | – | 9 | – | 0 |
| Idaho State | 0 | – | 6 | – | 0 | 1 | – | 9 | – | 0 |
$ – Conference champion; ^ – NCAA Division II playoff participant; Rankings from NCAA Division II AP Poll

1977 Big Sky Conference football standings
| | Conf. | | | | | Overall |
| Team | W | | L | | T | W | | L | | T |
|---|---|---|---|---|---|---|---|---|---|---|
| No. T–5 Boise State $ | 6 | – | 0 | – | 0 | 9 | – | 2 | – | 0 |
| No. T–5 Northern Arizona ^ | 5 | – | 1 | – | 0 | 9 | – | 3 | – | 0 |
| Montana State | 3 | – | 3 | – | 0 | 6 | – | 4 | – | 0 |
| Weber State | 2 | – | 4 | – | 0 | 4 | – | 6 | – | 0 |
| Idaho State | 2 | – | 4 | – | 0 | 3 | – | 8 | – | 0 |
| Idaho | 2 | – | 4 | – | 0 | 3 | – | 8 | – | 0 |
| Montana | 1 | – | 5 | – | 0 | 4 | – | 6 | – | 0 |
$ – Conference champion; ^ – NCAA Division II playoff participant; Boise State concluded its regular season after the NCAA Division II playoffs started; runner-up Northern Arizona was awarded playoff bid.; Rankings from NCAA Division II AP Poll

1978 Big Sky Conference football standings
| | Conf. | | | | | Overall |
| Team | W | | L | | T | W | | L | | T |
|---|---|---|---|---|---|---|---|---|---|---|
| No. 7 Northern Arizona $ | 6 | – | 0 | – | 0 | 8 | – | 2 | – | 0 |
| No. T–9 Montana State | 4 | – | 2 | – | 0 | 8 | – | 2 | – | 0 |
| Montana | 4 | – | 2 | – | 0 | 5 | – | 6 | – | 0 |
| Boise State | 3 | – | 3 | – | 0 | 7 | – | 4 | – | 0 |
| Weber State | 2 | – | 4 | – | 0 | 4 | – | 7 | – | 0 |
| Idaho | 2 | – | 4 | – | 0 | 2 | – | 9 | – | 0 |
| Idaho State | 0 | – | 6 | – | 0 | 2 | – | 9 | – | 0 |
$ – Conference champion; Rankings from NCAA Division I-AA AP Poll

1979 Big Sky Conference football standings
| | Conf. | | | | | Overall |
| Team | W | | L | | T | W | | L | | T |
|---|---|---|---|---|---|---|---|---|---|---|
| Boise State * | 7 | – | 0 | – | 0 | 10 | – | 1 | – | 0 |
| No. 9 Montana State $ | 6 | – | 1 | – | 0 | 6 | – | 4 | – | 0 |
| No. 5 Nevada ^ | 5 | – | 2 | – | 0 | 8 | – | 4 | – | 0 |
| No. T–10 Northern Arizona | 3 | – | 4 | – | 0 | 7 | – | 4 | – | 0 |
| Weber State | 3 | – | 4 | – | 0 | 3 | – | 8 | – | 0 |
| Idaho | 2 | – | 5 | – | 0 | 4 | – | 7 | – | 0 |
| Montana | 2 | – | 5 | – | 0 | 3 | – | 7 | – | 0 |
| Idaho State | 0 | – | 7 | – | 0 | 0 | – | 11 | – | 0 |
$ – Conference champion; ^ – NCAA Division I-AA playoff participant; * – Boise State was on probation; Rankings from NCAA Division I-AA AP Poll

1980 Big Sky Conference football standings
| | Conf. | | | | | Overall |
| Team | W | | L | | T | W | | L | | T |
|---|---|---|---|---|---|---|---|---|---|---|
| No. 7 Boise State $^ | 6 | – | 1 | – | 0 | 10 | – | 3 | – | 0 |
| Idaho | 4 | – | 3 | – | 0 | 6 | – | 5 | – | 0 |
| Nevada | 4 | – | 3 | – | 0 | 6 | – | 4 | – | 1 |
| Idaho State* | 4 | – | 4 | – | 0 | 6 | – | 5 | – | 0 |
| Weber State* | 4 | – | 4 | – | 0 | 4 | – | 7 | – | 0 |
| Montana State | 3 | – | 4 | – | 0 | 4 | – | 6 | – | 0 |
| Northern Arizona | 3 | – | 4 | – | 0 | 5 | – | 6 | – | 0 |
| Montana | 1 | – | 6 | – | 0 | 3 | – | 7 | – | 0 |
$ – Conference champion; ^ – NCAA Division I-AA playoff participant; * – Idaho State and Weber State met twice in league play with each game counting as a half game.; Rankings from NCAA Division I-AA AP Poll

1981 Big Sky Conference football standings
| | Conf. | | | | | Overall |
| Team | W | | L | | T | W | | L | | T |
|---|---|---|---|---|---|---|---|---|---|---|
| No. 2 Idaho State $^ | 6 | – | 1 | – | 0 | 12 | – | 1 | – | 0 |
| No. 5 Boise State ^ | 6 | – | 1 | – | 0 | 10 | – | 3 | – | 0 |
| Montana | 5 | – | 2 | – | 0 | 7 | – | 3 | – | 0 |
| Nevada | 4 | – | 3 | – | 0 | 7 | – | 4 | – | 0 |
| Weber State | 4 | – | 3 | – | 0 | 7 | – | 4 | – | 0 |
| Northern Arizona | 2 | – | 5 | – | 0 | 4 | – | 7 | – | 0 |
| Montana State | 1 | – | 6 | – | 0 | 3 | – | 7 | – | 0 |
| Idaho | 0 | – | 7 | – | 0 | 3 | – | 8 | – | 0 |
$ – Conference champion; ^ – NCAA Division I-AA playoff participant; Rankings from NCAA Division I-AA Committee poll

1982 Big Sky Conference football standings
| | Conf. | | | | | Overall |
| Team | W | | L | | T | W | | L | | T |
|---|---|---|---|---|---|---|---|---|---|---|
| No. 19 Montana $^ | 5 | – | 2 | – | 0 | 6 | – | 6 | – | 0 |
| No. 11 Idaho ^ | 5 | – | 2 | – | 0 | 9 | – | 4 | – | 0 |
| Montana State | 5 | – | 2 | – | 0 | 6 | – | 5 | – | 0 |
| No. 15 Boise State | 4 | – | 3 | – | 0 | 8 | – | 3 | – | 0 |
| Nevada | 3 | – | 4 | – | 0 | 6 | – | 5 | – | 0 |
| Northern Arizona | 3 | – | 4 | – | 0 | 4 | – | 7 | – | 0 |
| Weber State | 2 | – | 5 | – | 0 | 4 | – | 7 | – | 0 |
| Idaho State | 1 | – | 6 | – | 0 | 3 | – | 8 | – | 0 |
$ – Conference champion; ^ – NCAA Division I-AA playoff participant; Rankings from NCAA Division I-AA Poll

1983 Big Sky Conference football standings
| | Conf. | | | | | Overall |
| Team | W | | L | | T | W | | L | | T |
|---|---|---|---|---|---|---|---|---|---|---|
| No. 11 Nevada * $^ | 6 | – | 1 | – | 0 | 10 | – | 4 | – | 0 |
| No. 12 Idaho State ^ | 5 | – | 2 | – | 0 | 8 | – | 4 | – | 0 |
| Idaho | 4 | – | 3 | – | 0 | 8 | – | 3 | – | 0 |
| Boise State | 4 | – | 3 | – | 0 | 6 | – | 5 | – | 0 |
| Weber State | 3 | – | 4 | – | 0 | 6 | – | 5 | – | 0 |
| Montana | 3 | – | 4 | – | 0 | 4 | – | 6 | – | 0 |
| Northern Arizona | 2 | – | 5 | – | 0 | 4 | – | 7 | – | 0 |
| Montana State | 1 | – | 6 | – | 0 | 1 | – | 10 | – | 0 |
$ – Conference champion; ^ – NCAA Division I-AA playoff participant; * – Nevada was given a win on the Fremont Cannon after UNLV was forced to forfeit the game after an investigation found that ineligible players had participated in the 1983 and 1984 seasons.; Rankings from NCAA Division I-AA Poll

1984 Big Sky Conference football standings
| | Conf. | | | | | Overall |
| Team | W | | L | | T | W | | L | | T |
|---|---|---|---|---|---|---|---|---|---|---|
| No. 2 Montana State $^ | 6 | – | 1 | – | 0 | 12 | – | 2 | – | 0 |
| Nevada | 5 | – | 2 | – | 0 | 7 | – | 4 | – | 0 |
| Boise State | 4 | – | 3 | – | 0 | 6 | – | 5 | – | 0 |
| Idaho | 4 | – | 3 | – | 0 | 6 | – | 5 | – | 0 |
| Idaho State | 4 | – | 3 | – | 0 | 5 | – | 6 | – | 0 |
| Weber State | 3 | – | 4 | – | 0 | 5 | – | 6 | – | 0 |
| Northern Arizona | 2 | – | 5 | – | 0 | 4 | – | 6 | – | 0 |
| Montana | 0 | – | 7 | – | 0 | 2 | – | 8 | – | 1 |
$ – Conference champion; ^ – NCAA Division I-AA playoff participant; Rankings from NCAA Division I-AA Poll

1985 Big Sky Conference football standings
| | Conf. | | | | | Overall |
| Team | W | | L | | T | W | | L | | T |
|---|---|---|---|---|---|---|---|---|---|---|
| No. 5 Idaho $^ | 6 | – | 1 | – | 0 | 9 | – | 3 | – | 0 |
| No. T–2 Nevada ^ | 6 | – | 1 | – | 0 | 11 | – | 2 | – | 0 |
| Boise State | 5 | – | 2 | – | 0 | 7 | – | 4 | – | 0 |
| Weber State | 4 | – | 3 | – | 0 | 6 | – | 5 | – | 0 |
| Idaho State | 3 | – | 4 | – | 0 | 5 | – | 6 | – | 0 |
| Montana | 2 | – | 5 | – | 0 | 3 | – | 8 | – | 0 |
| Northern Arizona | 1 | – | 6 | – | 0 | 3 | – | 8 | – | 0 |
| Montana State | 1 | – | 6 | – | 0 | 2 | – | 9 | – | 0 |
$ – Conference champion; ^ – NCAA Division I-AA playoff participant; Rankings from NCAA Division I-AA Poll

1986 Big Sky Conference football standings
| | Conf. | | | | | Overall |
| Team | W | | L | | T | W | | L | | T |
|---|---|---|---|---|---|---|---|---|---|---|
| No. 1 Nevada $^ | 7 | – | 0 | – | 0 | 13 | – | 1 | – | 0 |
| No. 16 Idaho ^ | 8 | – | 2 | – | 0 | 8 | – | 4 | – | 0 |
| Northern Arizona | 5 | – | 2 | – | 0 | 7 | – | 4 | – | 0 |
| Montana * | 4 | – | 4 | – | 0 | 6 | – | 4 | – | 0 |
| Boise State | 3 | – | 4 | – | 0 | 5 | – | 6 | – | 0 |
| Weber State | 2 | – | 5 | – | 0 | 3 | – | 8 | – | 0 |
| Montana State | 2 | – | 5 | – | 0 | 3 | – | 8 | – | 0 |
| Idaho State * | 1 | – | 7 | – | 0 | 2 | – | 9 | – | 0 |
$ – Conference champion; ^ – NCAA Division I-AA playoff participant; * – Montana and Idaho State played twice.; Rankings from NCAA Division I-AA Poll

1987 Big Sky Conference football standings
| | Conf. | | | | | Overall |
| Team | W | | L | | T | W | | L | | T |
|---|---|---|---|---|---|---|---|---|---|---|
| No. 5 Idaho $^ | 7 | – | 1 | – | 0 | 9 | – | 3 | – | 0 |
| No. 10 Weber State ^ | 7 | – | 1 | – | 0 | 10 | – | 3 | – | 0 |
| Montana | 5 | – | 3 | – | 0 | 6 | – | 5 | – | 0 |
| Boise State | 4 | – | 4 | – | 0 | 6 | – | 5 | – | 0 |
| Nevada | 4 | – | 4 | – | 0 | 5 | – | 6 | – | 0 |
| Northern Arizona | 4 | – | 4 | – | 0 | 7 | – | 4 | – | 0 |
| Idaho State | 3 | – | 5 | – | 0 | 3 | – | 7 | – | 1 |
| Eastern Washington | 2 | – | 6 | – | 0 | 4 | – | 7 | – | 0 |
| Montana State | 0 | – | 8 | – | 0 | 1 | – | 10 | – | 0 |
$ – Conference champion; ^ – NCAA Division I-AA playoff participant; Rankings from NCAA Division I-AA Poll

1988 Big Sky Conference football standings
| | Conf. | | | | | Overall |
| Team | W | | L | | T | W | | L | | T |
|---|---|---|---|---|---|---|---|---|---|---|
| No. 1 Idaho $^ | 7 | – | 1 | – | 0 | 11 | – | 2 | – | 0 |
| No. 16 Montana ^ | 6 | – | 2 | – | 0 | 8 | – | 4 | – | 0 |
| No. 12 Boise State ^ | 5 | – | 3 | – | 0 | 8 | – | 4 | – | 0 |
| Nevada | 4 | – | 4 | – | 0 | 7 | – | 4 | – | 0 |
| Northern Arizona | 4 | – | 4 | – | 0 | 6 | – | 5 | – | 0 |
| Weber State | 4 | – | 4 | – | 0 | 5 | – | 6 | – | 0 |
| Montana State | 4 | – | 4 | – | 0 | 4 | – | 7 | – | 0 |
| Eastern Washington | 2 | – | 6 | – | 0 | 2 | – | 8 | – | 1 |
| Idaho State | 0 | – | 8 | – | 0 | 0 | – | 11 | – | 0 |
$ – Conference champion; ^ – NCAA Division I-AA playoff participant; Rankings from NCAA Division I-AA Poll

1989 Big Sky Conference football standings
| | Conf. | | | | | Overall |
| Team | W | | L | | T | W | | L | | T |
|---|---|---|---|---|---|---|---|---|---|---|
| No. T–4 Idaho $^ | 8 | – | 0 | – | 0 | 9 | – | 3 | – | 0 |
| No. 6 Montana ^ | 7 | – | 1 | – | 0 | 11 | – | 3 | – | 0 |
| No. 19 Nevada | 5 | – | 3 | – | 0 | 7 | – | 4 | – | 0 |
| Boise State | 5 | – | 3 | – | 0 | 6 | – | 5 | – | 0 |
| Eastern Washington | 4 | – | 4 | – | 0 | 4 | – | 6 | – | 0 |
| Northern Arizona | 2 | – | 6 | – | 0 | 3 | – | 8 | – | 0 |
| Montana State | 2 | – | 6 | – | 0 | 4 | – | 7 | – | 0 |
| Idaho State | 2 | – | 6 | – | 0 | 3 | – | 7 | – | 0 |
| Weber State | 1 | – | 7 | – | 0 | 3 | – | 8 | – | 0 |
$ – Conference champion; ^ – NCAA Division I-AA playoff participant; Rankings from NCAA Division I-AA Poll

1990 Big Sky Conference football standings
| | Conf. | | | | | Overall |
| Team | W | | L | | T | W | | L | | T |
|---|---|---|---|---|---|---|---|---|---|---|
| No. 4 Nevada $^ | 7 | – | 1 | – | 0 | 13 | – | 2 | – | 0 |
| No. 10 Boise State ^ | 6 | – | 2 | – | 0 | 10 | – | 4 | – | 0 |
| No. 13 Idaho ^ | 6 | – | 2 | – | 0 | 9 | – | 4 | – | 0 |
| Montana | 4 | – | 4 | – | 0 | 7 | – | 4 | – | 0 |
| Northern Arizona | 3 | – | 5 | – | 0 | 5 | – | 6 | – | 0 |
| Weber State | 3 | – | 5 | – | 0 | 5 | – | 6 | – | 0 |
| Eastern Washington | 3 | – | 5 | – | 0 | 5 | – | 6 | – | 0 |
| Montana State | 3 | – | 5 | – | 0 | 4 | – | 7 | – | 0 |
| Idaho State | 1 | – | 7 | – | 0 | 3 | – | 8 | – | 0 |
$ – Conference champion; ^ – NCAA Division I-AA playoff participant; Rankings from NCAA Division I-AA Poll

1991 Big Sky Conference football standings
| | Conf. | | | | | Overall |
| Team | W | | L | | T | W | | L | | T |
|---|---|---|---|---|---|---|---|---|---|---|
| No. 1 Nevada $^ | 8 | – | 0 | – | 0 | 12 | – | 1 | – | 0 |
| No. 15 Weber State ^ | 6 | – | 2 | – | 0 | 8 | – | 4 | – | 0 |
| Montana | 6 | – | 2 | – | 0 | 7 | – | 4 | – | 0 |
| Boise State | 4 | – | 4 | – | 0 | 7 | – | 4 | – | 0 |
| Idaho | 4 | – | 4 | – | 0 | 6 | – | 5 | – | 0 |
| Eastern Washington | 4 | – | 4 | – | 0 | 5 | – | 6 | – | 0 |
| Idaho State | 2 | – | 6 | – | 0 | 3 | – | 7 | – | 1 |
| Northern Arizona | 1 | – | 7 | – | 0 | 3 | – | 8 | – | 0 |
| Montana State | 1 | – | 7 | – | 0 | 2 | – | 9 | – | 0 |
$ – Conference champion; ^ – NCAA Division I-AA playoff participant; Rankings from NCAA Division I-AA Poll

1992 Big Sky Conference football standings
| | Conf. | | | | | Overall |
| Team | W | | L | | T | W | | L | | T |
|---|---|---|---|---|---|---|---|---|---|---|
| No. 5 Idaho +^ | 6 | – | 1 | – | 0 | 9 | – | 3 | – | 0 |
| No. 14 Eastern Washington +^ | 6 | – | 1 | – | 0 | 7 | – | 4 | – | 0 |
| Montana | 4 | – | 3 | – | 0 | 6 | – | 5 | – | 0 |
| Weber State | 4 | – | 3 | – | 0 | 6 | – | 5 | – | 0 |
| Boise State | 3 | – | 4 | – | 0 | 5 | – | 6 | – | 0 |
| Montana State | 2 | – | 5 | – | 0 | 4 | – | 7 | – | 0 |
| Northern Arizona | 2 | – | 5 | – | 0 | 4 | – | 7 | – | 0 |
| Idaho State | 1 | – | 6 | – | 0 | 3 | – | 8 | – | 0 |
+ – Conference co-champions; ^ – NCAA Division I-AA playoff participant; Rankings from NCAA Division I-AA Football Committee poll

1993 Big Sky Conference football standings
| | Conf. | | | | | Overall |
| Team | W | | L | | T | W | | L | | T |
|---|---|---|---|---|---|---|---|---|---|---|
| No. 3 Montana $^ | 7 | – | 0 | – | 0 | 10 | – | 2 | – | 0 |
| No. 11 Idaho ^ | 5 | – | 2 | – | 0 | 11 | – | 3 | – | 0 |
| No. 20 Eastern Washington | 5 | – | 2 | – | 0 | 7 | – | 3 | – | 0 |
| Montana State | 4 | – | 3 | – | 0 | 7 | – | 4 | – | 0 |
| Northern Arizona | 3 | – | 4 | – | 0 | 7 | – | 4 | – | 0 |
| Weber State | 3 | – | 4 | – | 0 | 7 | – | 4 | – | 0 |
| Boise State | 1 | – | 6 | – | 0 | 3 | – | 8 | – | 0 |
| Idaho State | 0 | – | 7 | – | 0 | 0 | – | 11 | – | 0 |
$ – Conference champion; ^ – NCAA Division I-AA playoff participant; Rankings from The Sports Network poll

1994 Big Sky Conference football standings
| | Conf. | | | | | Overall |
| Team | W | | L | | T | W | | L | | T |
|---|---|---|---|---|---|---|---|---|---|---|
| No. 3 Boise State $^ | 6 | – | 1 | – | 0 | 13 | – | 2 | – | 0 |
| No. 6 Idaho ^ | 5 | – | 2 | – | 0 | 9 | – | 3 | – | 0 |
| No. 8 Montana ^ | 5 | – | 2 | – | 0 | 11 | – | 3 | – | 0 |
| No. 25 Northern Arizona | 4 | – | 3 | – | 0 | 7 | – | 4 | – | 0 |
| Idaho State | 4 | – | 3 | – | 0 | 6 | – | 5 | – | 0 |
| Weber State | 2 | – | 5 | – | 0 | 5 | – | 6 | – | 0 |
| Eastern Washington | 2 | – | 5 | – | 0 | 4 | – | 7 | – | 0 |
| Montana State | 0 | – | 7 | – | 0 | 3 | – | 8 | – | 0 |
$ – Conference champion; ^ – NCAA Division I-AA playoff participant; Rankings from The Sports Network poll

1995 Big Sky Conference football standings
| | Conf. | | | | | Overall |
| Team | W | | L | | T | W | | L | | T |
|---|---|---|---|---|---|---|---|---|---|---|
| No. 8 Montana $^ | 6 | – | 1 | – | 0 | 13 | – | 2 | – | 0 |
| No. 21 Boise State | 4 | – | 3 | – | 0 | 7 | – | 4 | – | 0 |
| No. 22 Northern Arizona | 4 | – | 3 | – | 0 | 7 | – | 4 | – | 0 |
| No. 17 Idaho ^ | 4 | – | 3 | – | 0 | 6 | – | 5 | – | 0 |
| Weber State | 4 | – | 3 | – | 0 | 6 | – | 5 | – | 0 |
| Idaho State | 3 | – | 4 | – | 0 | 6 | – | 5 | – | 0 |
| Montana State | 2 | – | 5 | – | 0 | 5 | – | 6 | – | 0 |
| Eastern Washington | 1 | – | 6 | – | 0 | 3 | – | 8 | – | 0 |
$ – Conference champion; ^ – NCAA Division I-AA playoff participant; Rankings from The Sports Network poll

1996 Big Sky Conference football standings
| | Conf. | | | Overall |
| Team | W | | L | W | | L |
|---|---|---|---|---|---|---|
| No. 2 Montana $^ | 7 | – | 0 | 14 | – | 1 |
| No. 6 Northern Arizona ^ | 6 | – | 1 | 9 | – | 3 |
| Cal State Northridge | 4 | – | 3 | 7 | – | 4 |
| Weber State | 4 | – | 3 | 7 | – | 4 |
| Eastern Washington | 3 | – | 4 | 6 | – | 5 |
| Montana State | 3 | – | 4 | 6 | – | 5 |
| Idaho State | 1 | – | 6 | 4 | – | 7 |
| Sacramento State | 0 | – | 7 | 1 | – | 10 |
| Portland State | 0 | – | 0 | 3 | – | 8 |
$ – Conference champion; ^ – NCAA Division I-AA playoff participant; Portland State games did not count in conference standings; Rankings from The Sports Network poll

1997 Big Sky Conference football standings
| | Conf. | | | Overall |
| Team | W | | L | W | | L |
|---|---|---|---|---|---|---|
| No. 6 Eastern Washington $^ | 7 | – | 1 | 12 | – | 2 |
| No. 11 Montana ^ | 6 | – | 2 | 8 | – | 4 |
| Montana State | 5 | – | 3 | 6 | – | 5 |
| Northern Arizona | 4 | – | 4 | 6 | – | 5 |
| Weber State | 4 | – | 4 | 6 | – | 5 |
| Cal State Northridge | 4 | – | 4 | 4 | – | 8 |
| Portland State | 3 | – | 5 | 4 | – | 7 |
| Idaho State | 2 | – | 6 | 3 | – | 8 |
| Sacramento State | 1 | – | 7 | 1 | – | 10 |
$ – Conference champion; ^ – NCAA Division I-AA playoff participant; Cal State Northridge record includes two losses by forfeit; Rankings from The Sports Network poll

1998 Big Sky Conference football standings
| | Conf. | | | Overall |
| Team | W | | L | W | | L |
|---|---|---|---|---|---|---|
| No. 15 Montana $^ | 6 | – | 2 | 8 | – | 4 |
| Cal State Northridge | 5 | – | 3 | 7 | – | 4 |
| No. 25 Montana State | 5 | – | 3 | 7 | – | 4 |
| Weber State | 4 | – | 4 | 6 | – | 5 |
| Eastern Washington | 4 | – | 4 | 5 | – | 6 |
| Portland State | 4 | – | 4 | 5 | – | 6 |
| Northern Arizona | 3 | – | 5 | 6 | – | 5 |
| Sacramento State | 3 | – | 5 | 5 | – | 6 |
| Idaho State | 2 | – | 6 | 3 | – | 8 |
$ – Conference champion; ^ – NCAA Division I-AA playoff participant; Rankings from The Sports Network poll

1999 Big Sky Conference football standings
| | Conf. | | | Overall |
| Team | W | | L | W | | L |
|---|---|---|---|---|---|---|
| No. 8 Montana $^ | 7 | – | 1 | 9 | – | 3 |
| No. 20 Portland State | 6 | – | 2 | 8 | – | 3 |
| Eastern Washington | 6 | – | 2 | 7 | – | 4 |
| Cal State Northridge | 5 | – | 3 | 6 | – | 5 |
| Sacramento State | 3 | – | 5 | 6 | – | 5 |
| Weber State | 3 | – | 5 | 4 | – | 7 |
| Idaho State | 2 | – | 6 | 4 | – | 7 |
| Montana State | 2 | – | 6 | 4 | – | 7 |
| No. 16 Northern Arizona ^ | 2 | – | 6 | 4 | – | 8 |
$ – Conference champion; ^ – NCAA Division I-AA playoff participant; Portland State games did not count in conference standings. Northern Arizona forfeited four conference wins, to Idaho State, Montana State, Weber State, Cal State Northridge.; Rankings from The Sports Network poll

2000 Big Sky Conference football standings
| | Conf. | | | Overall |
| Team | W | | L | W | | L |
|---|---|---|---|---|---|---|
| No. 2 Montana $^ | 8 | – | 0 | 13 | – | 2 |
| No. 15 Portland State ^ | 5 | – | 3 | 8 | – | 4 |
| No. 18 Weber State | 5 | – | 3 | 7 | – | 4 |
| Sacramento State | 5 | – | 3 | 7 | – | 4 |
| Eastern Washington | 5 | – | 3 | 6 | – | 5 |
| Idaho State | 4 | – | 4 | 6 | – | 5 |
| Cal State Northridge | 2 | – | 6 | 4 | – | 7 |
| Northern Arizona | 2 | – | 6 | 3 | – | 8 |
| Montana State | 0 | – | 8 | 0 | – | 11 |
$ – Conference champion; ^ – NCAA Division I-AA playoff participant; Rankings from The Sports Network poll

2001 Big Sky Conference football standings
| | Conf. | | | Overall |
| Team | W | | L | W | | L |
|---|---|---|---|---|---|---|
| No. 1 Montana $^ | 7 | – | 0 | 15 | – | 1 |
| No. 16 Northern Arizona ^ | 5 | – | 2 | 9 | – | 4 |
| Portland State | 5 | – | 2 | 7 | – | 4 |
| Montana State | 4 | – | 3 | 5 | – | 6 |
| Eastern Washington | 3 | – | 4 | 7 | – | 4 |
| Weber State | 2 | – | 5 | 3 | – | 8 |
| Idaho State | 1 | – | 6 | 4 | – | 7 |
| Sacramento State | 1 | – | 6 | 2 | – | 9 |
$ – Conference champion; ^ – NCAA Division I-AA playoff participant; Rankings from The Sports Network poll

2002 Big Sky Conference football standings
| | Conf. | | | Overall |
| Team | W | | L | W | | L |
|---|---|---|---|---|---|---|
| No. 7 Montana +^ | 5 | – | 2 | 11 | – | 3 |
| No. 19 Montana State +^ | 5 | – | 2 | 7 | – | 6 |
| No. 18 Idaho State + | 5 | – | 2 | 8 | – | 3 |
| Eastern Washington | 3 | – | 4 | 6 | – | 5 |
| Northern Arizona | 3 | – | 4 | 6 | – | 5 |
| Portland State | 3 | – | 4 | 6 | – | 5 |
| Sacramento State | 3 | – | 4 | 5 | – | 8 |
| Weber State | 1 | – | 6 | 3 | – | 8 |
+ – Conference co-champions; ^ – NCAA Division I-AA playoff participant; Rankings from The Sports Network poll

2003 Big Sky Conference football standings
| | Conf. | | | Overall |
| Team | W | | L | W | | L |
|---|---|---|---|---|---|---|
| No. 14 Montana +^ | 5 | – | 2 | 9 | – | 4 |
| No. 10 Northern Arizona +^ | 5 | – | 2 | 9 | – | 4 |
| No. 21 Montana State +^ | 5 | – | 2 | 7 | – | 6 |
| No. 22 Idaho State | 4 | – | 3 | 8 | – | 4 |
| Weber State | 4 | – | 3 | 8 | – | 4 |
| Eastern Washington | 3 | – | 4 | 6 | – | 5 |
| Portland State | 1 | – | 6 | 4 | – | 7 |
| Sacramento State | 1 | – | 6 | 2 | – | 9 |
+ – Conference co-champions; ^ – NCAA Division I-AA playoff participant; Rankings from The Sports Network poll

2004 Big Sky Conference football standings
| | Conf. | | | Overall |
| Team | W | | L | W | | L |
|---|---|---|---|---|---|---|
| No. 2 Montana $^ | 6 | – | 1 | 12 | – | 3 |
| No. 8 Eastern Washington ^ | 6 | – | 1 | 9 | – | 4 |
| Montana State | 4 | – | 3 | 6 | – | 5 |
| Portland State | 4 | – | 3 | 7 | – | 4 |
| Northern Arizona | 3 | – | 4 | 4 | – | 7 |
| Idaho State | 2 | – | 5 | 3 | – | 8 |
| Sacramento State | 2 | – | 5 | 3 | – | 8 |
| Weber State | 1 | – | 6 | 1 | – | 10 |
$ – Conference champion; ^ – NCAA Division I-AA playoff participant; Rankings from The Sports Network poll

2005 Big Sky Conference football standings
| | Conf. | | | Overall |
| Team | W | | L | W | | L |
|---|---|---|---|---|---|---|
| No. 13 Eastern Washington $^ | 5 | – | 2 | 7 | – | 5 |
| No. 12 Montana ^ | 5 | – | 2 | 8 | – | 4 |
| No. 18 Montana State | 5 | – | 2 | 7 | – | 4 |
| Portland State | 4 | – | 3 | 6 | – | 5 |
| Weber State | 4 | – | 3 | 6 | – | 5 |
| Idaho State | 3 | – | 4 | 5 | – | 6 |
| Sacramento State | 1 | – | 6 | 2 | – | 9 |
| Northern Arizona | 1 | – | 6 | 3 | – | 8 |
$ – Conference champion; ^ – NCAA Division I-AA playoff participant; Rankings from The Sports Network poll

2006 Big Sky Conference football standings
| | Conf. | | | Overall |
| Team | W | | L | W | | L |
|---|---|---|---|---|---|---|
| No. 3 Montana $^ | 8 | – | 0 | 12 | – | 2 |
| No. 10 Montana State ^ | 6 | – | 2 | 8 | – | 5 |
| No. 19 Portland State | 6 | – | 2 | 7 | – | 4 |
| Northern Arizona | 5 | – | 3 | 6 | – | 5 |
| Sacramento State | 4 | – | 4 | 4 | – | 7 |
| Weber State | 3 | – | 5 | 4 | – | 7 |
| Eastern Washington | 3 | – | 5 | 3 | – | 8 |
| Idaho State | 1 | – | 7 | 2 | – | 9 |
| Northern Colorado | 0 | – | 8 | 1 | – | 10 |
$ – Conference champion; ^ – FCS playoff participant; Rankings from The Sports Network poll

2007 Big Sky Conference football standings
| | Conf. | | | Overall |
| Team | W | | L | W | | L |
|---|---|---|---|---|---|---|
| No. 10 Montana $^ | 8 | – | 0 | 11 | – | 1 |
| No. 8 Eastern Washington ^ | 6 | – | 2 | 9 | – | 4 |
| Northern Arizona | 5 | – | 3 | 6 | – | 5 |
| Montana State | 4 | – | 4 | 6 | – | 5 |
| Weber State | 4 | – | 4 | 5 | – | 6 |
| Portland State | 3 | – | 5 | 3 | – | 8 |
| Sacramento State | 3 | – | 5 | 3 | – | 8 |
| Idaho State | 2 | – | 6 | 3 | – | 8 |
| Northern Colorado | 1 | – | 7 | 1 | – | 11 |
$ – Conference champion; ^ – FCS playoff participant; Rankings from The Sports Network poll

2008 Big Sky Conference football standings
| | Conf. | | | Overall |
| Team | W | | L | W | | L |
|---|---|---|---|---|---|---|
| No. 2 Montana $^ | 7 | – | 1 | 14 | – | 2 |
| No. 7 Weber State $^ | 7 | – | 1 | 10 | – | 4 |
| Montana State | 5 | – | 3 | 7 | – | 5 |
| Eastern Washington | 5 | – | 3 | 6 | – | 5 |
| Northern Arizona | 4 | – | 4 | 6 | – | 5 |
| Sacramento State | 3 | – | 5 | 6 | – | 6 |
| Portland State | 3 | – | 5 | 4 | – | 7 |
| Northern Colorado | 1 | – | 7 | 1 | – | 10 |
| Idaho State | 1 | – | 7 | 1 | – | 11 |
$ – Conference champion; ^ – FCS playoff participant; Rankings from The Sports Network poll

2010 Big Sky Conference football standings
| | Conf. | | | Overall |
| Team | W | | L | W | | L |
|---|---|---|---|---|---|---|
| No. 1 Eastern Washington +^ | 7 | – | 1 | 13 | – | 2 |
| No. 11 Montana State +^ | 7 | – | 1 | 9 | – | 3 |
| No. 20 Montana | 5 | – | 3 | 7 | – | 4 |
| Weber State | 5 | – | 3 | 6 | – | 5 |
| Sacramento State | 5 | – | 3 | 6 | – | 5 |
| Northern Arizona | 4 | – | 4 | 6 | – | 5 |
| Northern Colorado | 2 | – | 6 | 3 | – | 8 |
| Portland State | 1 | – | 7 | 2 | – | 9 |
| Idaho State | 0 | – | 8 | 1 | – | 10 |
$ – Conference champion; ^ – FCS playoff participant; Rankings from The Sports Network poll

2011 Big Sky Conference football standings
| | Conf. | | | Overall |
| Team | W | | L | W | | L |
|---|---|---|---|---|---|---|
| No. 7 Montana State $^ | 7 | – | 1 | 10 | – | 3 |
| No. ~~5~~ Montana† ^ | 5 | – | 1 | 6 | – | 2 |
| Portland State | 5 | – | 3 | 7 | – | 4 |
| Eastern Washington | 5 | – | 3 | 6 | – | 5 |
| Weber State | 5 | – | 3 | 5 | – | 6 |
| Northern Arizona | 3 | – | 5 | 4 | – | 7 |
| Sacramento State | 3 | – | 5 | 4 | – | 7 |
| Idaho State* | 1 | – | 7 | 2 | – | 9 |
| Northern Colorado | 0 | – | 8 | 0 | – | 11 |
$ – Conference champion; ^ – FCS playoff participant; † Montana vacated two conference wins, five total wins, their conference co-championship, and playoff participation (three games, including two of the five total wins) in 2011 * Idaho State ineligible for FCS playoffs due to APR violations; Rankings from The Sports Network poll, using Montana's later-diminished W–L record

2012 Big Sky Conference football standings
| | Conf. | | | Overall |
| Team | W | | L | W | | L |
|---|---|---|---|---|---|---|
| No. 4 Eastern Washington +^ | 7 | – | 1 | 11 | – | 3 |
| No. 5 Montana State +^ | 7 | – | 1 | 11 | – | 2 |
| No. 12 Cal Poly +^ | 7 | – | 1 | 9 | – | 3 |
| No. 20 Northern Arizona | 6 | – | 2 | 8 | – | 3 |
| Sacramento State | 4 | – | 4 | 6 | – | 5 |
| Northern Colorado | 4 | – | 4 | 5 | – | 6 |
| Southern Utah | 4 | – | 4 | 5 | – | 6 |
| North Dakota | 3 | – | 5 | 5 | – | 6 |
| Montana | 3 | – | 5 | 5 | – | 6 |
| UC Davis | 3 | – | 5 | 4 | – | 7 |
| Portland State | 2 | – | 6 | 3 | – | 8 |
| Weber State | 2 | – | 6 | 2 | – | 9 |
| Idaho State | 0 | – | 8 | 1 | – | 10 |
$ – Conference champion; ^ – FCS playoff participant; Rankings from The Sports Network poll

2013 Big Sky Conference football standings
| | Conf. | | | Overall |
| Team | W | | L | W | | L |
|---|---|---|---|---|---|---|
| No. 3 Eastern Washington $^ | 8 | – | 0 | 12 | – | 3 |
| No. 5 Northern Arizona ^ | 7 | – | 1 | 9 | – | 3 |
| No. 8 Montana ^ | 6 | – | 2 | 10 | – | 3 |
| No. 21 Southern Utah ^ | 5 | – | 3 | 8 | – | 5 |
| No. 20 Montana State | 5 | – | 3 | 7 | – | 5 |
| Cal Poly | 5 | – | 3 | 6 | – | 6 |
| UC Davis | 5 | – | 3 | 5 | – | 7 |
| Sacramento State | 4 | – | 4 | 5 | – | 7 |
| Portland State | 3 | – | 5 | 6 | – | 6 |
| North Dakota | 2 | – | 6 | 3 | – | 8 |
| Idaho State | 1 | – | 7 | 3 | – | 9 |
| Weber State | 1 | – | 7 | 2 | – | 10 |
| Northern Colorado | 0 | – | 8 | 1 | – | 11 |
$ – Conference champion; ^ – FCS playoff participant; Rankings from The Sports Network poll

2014 Big Sky Conference football standings
| | Conf. | | | Overall |
| Team | W | | L | W | | L |
|---|---|---|---|---|---|---|
| No. 4 Eastern Washington $^ | 7 | – | 1 | 11 | – | 3 |
| No. 13 Montana ^ | 6 | – | 2 | 9 | – | 5 |
| No. 20 Montana State ^ | 6 | – | 2 | 8 | – | 5 |
| No. 25 Idaho State | 6 | – | 2 | 8 | – | 4 |
| Cal Poly | 5 | – | 3 | 7 | – | 5 |
| Northern Arizona | 5 | – | 3 | 7 | – | 5 |
| Sacramento State | 4 | – | 4 | 7 | – | 5 |
| North Dakota | 3 | – | 5 | 5 | – | 7 |
| Southern Utah | 3 | – | 5 | 3 | – | 9 |
| Northern Colorado | 2 | – | 6 | 3 | – | 8 |
| Portland State | 2 | – | 6 | 3 | – | 9 |
| Weber State | 2 | – | 6 | 2 | – | 10 |
| UC Davis | 1 | – | 7 | 2 | – | 9 |
$ – Conference champion; ^ – FCS playoff participant; Rankings from The Sports Network poll

2015 Big Sky Conference football standings
| | Conf. | | | Overall |
| Team | W | | L | W | | L |
|---|---|---|---|---|---|---|
| No. 18 Southern Utah $^ | 7 | – | 1 | 8 | – | 4 |
| No. 10 Portland State ^ | 6 | – | 2 | 9 | – | 3 |
| No. 14 Montana ^ | 6 | – | 2 | 8 | – | 5 |
| North Dakota | 5 | – | 3 | 7 | – | 4 |
| Northern Arizona | 5 | – | 3 | 7 | – | 4 |
| Eastern Washington | 5 | – | 3 | 6 | – | 5 |
| Weber State | 5 | – | 3 | 6 | – | 5 |
| Northern Colorado | 3 | – | 5 | 6 | – | 5 |
| Montana State | 3 | – | 5 | 5 | – | 6 |
| Cal Poly | 3 | – | 5 | 4 | – | 7 |
| UC Davis | 2 | – | 6 | 2 | – | 9 |
| Idaho State | 1 | – | 7 | 2 | – | 9 |
| Sacramento State | 1 | – | 7 | 2 | – | 9 |
$ – Conference champion; ^ – FCS playoff participant; Rankings from STATS Poll

2016 Big Sky Conference football standings
| | Conf. | | | Overall |
| Team | W | | L | W | | L |
|---|---|---|---|---|---|---|
| No. 4 Eastern Washington +^ | 8 | – | 0 | 12 | – | 2 |
| No. 12 North Dakota +^ | 8 | – | 0 | 9 | – | 3 |
| No. 25 Weber State ^ | 6 | – | 2 | 7 | – | 5 |
| No. 24 Cal Poly ^ | 5 | – | 3 | 7 | – | 5 |
| Southern Utah | 5 | – | 3 | 6 | – | 5 |
| Northern Colorado | 4 | – | 4 | 6 | – | 5 |
| Northern Arizona | 4 | – | 4 | 5 | – | 6 |
| Montana | 3 | – | 5 | 6 | – | 5 |
| Montana State | 2 | – | 6 | 4 | – | 7 |
| Portland State | 2 | – | 6 | 3 | – | 8 |
| UC Davis | 2 | – | 6 | 3 | – | 8 |
| Sacramento State | 2 | – | 6 | 2 | – | 9 |
| Idaho State | 1 | – | 7 | 2 | – | 9 |
$ – Conference champion; ^ – FCS playoff participant; Rankings from STATS Poll

2017 Big Sky Conference football standings
| | Conf. | | | Overall |
| Team | W | | L | W | | L |
|---|---|---|---|---|---|---|
| No. 14 Southern Utah +^ | 7 | – | 1 | 9 | – | 3 |
| No. 5 Weber State +^ | 7 | – | 1 | 11 | – | 3 |
| Northern Arizona ^ | 6 | – | 2 | 7 | – | 5 |
| No. 21 Eastern Washington | 6 | – | 2 | 7 | – | 4 |
| Sacramento State | 6 | – | 2 | 7 | – | 4 |
| Montana | 5 | – | 3 | 7 | – | 4 |
| Montana State | 5 | – | 3 | 5 | – | 6 |
| UC Davis | 3 | – | 5 | 5 | – | 6 |
| Idaho State | 2 | – | 6 | 4 | – | 7 |
| Northern Colorado | 2 | – | 6 | 3 | – | 7 |
| North Dakota | 2 | – | 6 | 3 | – | 8 |
| Cal Poly | 1 | – | 7 | 1 | – | 10 |
| Portland State | 0 | – | 8 | 0 | – | 11 |
$ – Conference champion; ^ – FCS playoff participant; Rankings from STATS Poll

2018 Big Sky Conference football standings
| | Conf. | | | Overall |
| Team | W | | L | W | | L |
|---|---|---|---|---|---|---|
| No. 6 Weber State +^ | 7 | – | 1 | 10 | – | 3 |
| No. 2 Eastern Washington +^ | 7 | – | 1 | 12 | – | 3 |
| No. 7 UC Davis +^ | 7 | – | 1 | 10 | – | 3 |
| No. 17 Montana State ^ | 5 | – | 3 | 8 | – | 5 |
| Idaho State | 5 | – | 3 | 6 | – | 5 |
| Montana | 4 | – | 4 | 6 | – | 5 |
| Cal Poly | 4 | – | 4 | 5 | – | 6 |
| Northern Arizona | 3 | – | 4 | 4 | – | 6 |
| Portland State | 3 | – | 5 | 4 | – | 7 |
| Idaho | 3 | – | 5 | 4 | – | 7 |
| Northern Colorado | 2 | – | 6 | 2 | – | 9 |
| Southern Utah | 1 | – | 7 | 1 | – | 10 |
| Sacramento State | 0 | – | 7 | 2 | – | 8 |
$ – Conference champion; ^ – FCS playoff participant; Although North Dakota was classified as an independent, games against them still counted as Big Sky Conference games.; Rankings from STATS Poll

2019 Big Sky Conference football standings
| | Conf. | | | Overall |
| Team | W | | L | W | | L |
|---|---|---|---|---|---|---|
| No. 3 Weber State +^ | 7 | – | 1 | 11 | – | 4 |
| No. 9 Sacramento State +^ | 7 | – | 1 | 9 | – | 4 |
| No. 4 Montana State ^ | 6 | – | 2 | 11 | – | 4 |
| No. 6 Montana ^ | 6 | – | 2 | 10 | – | 4 |
| Eastern Washington | 6 | – | 2 | 7 | – | 5 |
| Idaho | 3 | – | 5 | 5 | – | 7 |
| Portland State | 3 | – | 5 | 5 | – | 7 |
| UC Davis | 3 | – | 5 | 5 | – | 7 |
| Northern Arizona | 2 | – | 6 | 4 | – | 8 |
| Cal Poly | 2 | – | 6 | 3 | – | 8 |
| Idaho State | 2 | – | 6 | 3 | – | 9 |
| Southern Utah | 2 | – | 6 | 3 | – | 9 |
| Northern Colorado | 2 | – | 6 | 2 | – | 10 |
+ – Conference co-champions; ^ – FCS playoff participant; Although North Dakota was classified as an independent, games against them still counted as Big Sky Conference games.; Rankings from STATS Poll

2020 Big Sky Conference football standings
| | Conf. | | | Overall |
| Team | W | | L | W | | L |
|---|---|---|---|---|---|---|
| No. 9 Weber State $^ | 5 | – | 0 | 5 | – | 1 |
| No. 10 Eastern Washington ^ | 5 | – | 1 | 5 | – | 2 |
| No. 14 UC Davis | 3 | – | 2 | 3 | – | 2 |
| Northern Arizona | 3 | – | 2 | 3 | – | 2 |
| Idaho State | 2 | – | 4 | 2 | – | 4 |
| Idaho | 2 | – | 4 | 2 | – | 4 |
| Southern Utah | 1 | – | 5 | 1 | – | 5 |
| Cal Poly‡ | 0 | – | 3 | 0 | – | 3 |
| Montana† | | – | | 2 | – | 0 |
| Portland State† | | – | | 0 | – | 1 |
$ – Conference champion; ^ – FCS playoff participant; Notes: Due to COVID-19, the Big Sky suspended the fall 2020 football season. Montana State, Northern Colorado, and Sacramento State opted out of the spring season. † – Montana and Portland State opted out of the conference season, but scheduled non-conference games. ‡ – Cal Poly opted out of the remainder of the spring season on March 29, 2021.; Rankings from STATS Poll

2021 Big Sky Conference football standings
| | Conf. | | | Overall |
| Team | W | | L | W | | L |
|---|---|---|---|---|---|---|
| No. 10 Sacramento State $^ | 8 | – | 0 | 9 | – | 3 |
| No. 2 Montana State ^ | 7 | – | 1 | 11 | – | 3 |
| No. 7 Eastern Washington ^ | 6 | – | 2 | 10 | – | 3 |
| No. 6 Montana ^ | 6 | – | 2 | 10 | – | 3 |
| No. 17 UC Davis ^ | 5 | – | 3 | 8 | – | 4 |
| Weber State | 5 | – | 3 | 6 | – | 5 |
| Northern Arizona | 4 | – | 4 | 5 | – | 6 |
| Portland State | 4 | – | 4 | 5 | – | 6 |
| Idaho | 3 | – | 5 | 4 | – | 7 |
| Northern Colorado | 2 | – | 6 | 3 | – | 8 |
| Cal Poly | 1 | – | 7 | 2 | – | 9 |
| Idaho State | 1 | – | 7 | 1 | – | 10 |
| Southern Utah | 0 | – | 8 | 1 | – | 10 |
$ – Conference champion; ^ – FCS playoff participant; Rankings from STATS Poll

2022 Big Sky Conference football standings
| | Conf. | | | Overall |
| Team | W | | L | W | | L |
|---|---|---|---|---|---|---|
| No. 4 Montana State +^ | 8 | – | 0 | 12 | – | 2 |
| No. 5 Sacramento State +^ | 8 | – | 0 | 12 | – | 1 |
| No. 9 Weber State ^ | 6 | – | 2 | 10 | – | 3 |
| No. 18 Idaho ^ | 6 | – | 2 | 7 | – | 5 |
| No. 25 UC Davis | 5 | – | 3 | 6 | – | 5 |
| No. 14 Montana ^ | 4 | – | 4 | 8 | – | 5 |
| Portland State | 3 | – | 5 | 4 | – | 7 |
| Eastern Washington | 2 | – | 6 | 3 | – | 8 |
| Northern Colorado | 2 | – | 6 | 3 | – | 8 |
| Northern Arizona | 2 | – | 6 | 3 | – | 8 |
| Idaho State | 1 | – | 7 | 1 | – | 10 |
| Cal Poly | 1 | – | 7 | 2 | – | 9 |
+ – Conference co-champions; ^ – FCS playoff participant; Rankings from STATS Poll

2023 Big Sky Conference football standings
| | Conf. | | | Overall |
| Team | W | | L | W | | L |
|---|---|---|---|---|---|---|
| No. 2 Montana $^ | 7 | – | 1 | 13 | – | 2 |
| No. 8 Idaho ^ | 6 | – | 2 | 9 | – | 4 |
| No. 9 Montana State ^ | 6 | – | 2 | 8 | – | 4 |
| Northern Arizona | 5 | – | 3 | 5 | – | 6 |
| No. 24 UC Davis | 5 | – | 3 | 7 | – | 4 |
| No. 13 Sacramento State ^ | 4 | – | 4 | 8 | – | 5 |
| Portland State | 4 | – | 4 | 5 | – | 6 |
| Weber State | 4 | – | 4 | 6 | – | 5 |
| Eastern Washington | 3 | – | 5 | 4 | – | 7 |
| Idaho State | 3 | – | 5 | 3 | – | 8 |
| Cal Poly | 1 | – | 7 | 3 | – | 8 |
| Northern Colorado | 0 | – | 8 | 0 | – | 11 |
$ – Conference champion; ^ – FCS playoff participant; Rankings from STATS Poll

2024 Big Sky Conference football standings
| | Conf. | | | Overall |
| Team | W | | L | W | | L |
|---|---|---|---|---|---|---|
| No. 2 Montana State $^ | 8 | – | 0 | 15 | – | 1 |
| No. 5 UC Davis ^ | 7 | – | 1 | 11 | – | 3 |
| No. 7 Idaho ^ | 6 | – | 2 | 10 | – | 4 |
| No. 22 Northern Arizona ^ | 6 | – | 2 | 8 | – | 5 |
| No. 10 Montana ^ | 5 | – | 3 | 9 | – | 5 |
| Idaho State | 3 | – | 5 | 5 | – | 7 |
| Eastern Washington | 3 | – | 5 | 4 | – | 8 |
| Weber State | 3 | – | 5 | 4 | – | 8 |
| Portland State | 3 | – | 5 | 3 | – | 8 |
| Cal Poly | 2 | – | 6 | 3 | – | 8 |
| Sacramento State | 1 | – | 7 | 3 | – | 9 |
| Northern Colorado | 1 | – | 7 | 1 | – | 11 |
$ – Conference champion; ^ – FCS playoff participant; Rankings from STATS Poll

2025 Big Sky Conference football standings
| | Conf. | | | Overall |
| Team | W | | L | W | | L |
|---|---|---|---|---|---|---|
| Cal Poly | 0 | – | 0 | 0 | – | 0 |
| Eastern Washington | 0 | – | 0 | 0 | – | 0 |
| No. 12 Idaho | 0 | – | 0 | 0 | – | 0 |
| No. 7 Montana | 0 | – | 0 | 0 | – | 0 |
| No. 2 Montana State | 0 | – | 0 | 0 | – | 0 |
| No. 19 Northern Arizona | 0 | – | 0 | 0 | – | 0 |
| Northern Colorado | 0 | – | 0 | 0 | – | 0 |
| No. 15 Sacramento State | 0 | – | 0 | 0 | – | 0 |
| No. 8 UC Davis | 0 | – | 0 | 0 | – | 0 |
| Weber State | 0 | – | 0 | 0 | – | 0 |
| Idaho State | 0 | – | 0 | 0 | – | 1 |
| Portland State | 0 | – | 0 | 0 | – | 1 |
As of August 25, 2025; Rankings from STATS Poll
