= 2020 Southern Utah Thunderbirds football team =

American college football season

2020 Southern Utah Thunderbirds football
- Conference: Big Sky Conference
- Record: 1–5 (1–5 Big Sky)
- Head coach: Demario Warren (5th season)
- Offensive coordinator: Matt Wade (1st season)
- Co-defensive coordinators: Robert Bala (1st season); Tommy Collet Jr. (1st season)
- Home stadium: Eccles Coliseum

2020 Big Sky Conference football standings
| | Conf. | | | Overall |
| Team | W | | L | W | | L |
|---|---|---|---|---|---|---|
| No. 9 Weber State $^ | 5 | – | 0 | 5 | – | 1 |
| No. 10 Eastern Washington ^ | 5 | – | 1 | 5 | – | 2 |
| No. 14 UC Davis | 3 | – | 2 | 3 | – | 2 |
| Northern Arizona | 3 | – | 2 | 3 | – | 2 |
| Idaho State | 2 | – | 4 | 2 | – | 4 |
| Idaho | 2 | – | 4 | 2 | – | 4 |
| Southern Utah | 1 | – | 5 | 1 | – | 5 |
| Cal Poly‡ | 0 | – | 3 | 0 | – | 3 |
| Montana† | | – | | 2 | – | 0 |
| Portland State† | | – | | 0 | – | 1 |
$ – Conference champion; ^ – FCS playoff participant; Notes: Due to COVID-19, the Big Sky suspended the fall 2020 football season. Montana State, Northern Colorado, and Sacramento State opted out of the spring season. † – Montana and Portland State opted out of the conference season, but scheduled non-conference games. ‡ – Cal Poly opted out of the remainder of the spring season on March 29, 2021.; Rankings from STATS Poll

The 2020 Southern Utah Thunderbirds football team represented Southern Utah University in the 2020–21 NCAA Division I FCS football season. They were led by fifth-year head coach Demario Warren and played their home games at Eccles Coliseum in Cedar City, Utah. They played as a member of the Big Sky Conference.

== Preseason ==
=== Polls ===
On July 23, 2020, during the virtual Big Sky Kickoff, the Thunderbirds were predicted to finish twelfth in the Big Sky by both the coaches and media.

== Schedule ==
| Date | Time | Opponent | Site | TV | Result | Attendance |
|---|---|---|---|---|---|---|
| February 27 | 1:00 p.m. | at Northern Arizona | Walkup Skydome; Flagstaff, AZ (Grand Canyon Rivalry) | Pluto TV | L 33–34 | 0 |
| March 6 | 12:00 p.m. | Idaho State | Eccles Coliseum; Cedar City, UT | Pluto TV | L 24–26 | 1,608 |
| March 13 | 2:00 p.m. | at Cal Poly | Alex G. Spanos Stadium; San Luis Obispo, CA | | W 34–24 | 0 |
| March 27 | 1:00 p.m. | at Idaho | Kibbie Dome; Moscow, ID | | L 32–33 | 1,947 |
| April 3 | 2:00 p.m. | No. 3 Weber State | Eccles Coliseum; Cedar City, UT (Beehive Bowl) | | L 16–19 | 2,803 |
| April 10 | 4:00 p.m. | Northern Arizona | Eccles Coliseum; Cedar City, UT (Grand Canyon Rivalry) | | L 20–28 | 1,800 |
Rankings from STATS Poll released prior to the game; All times are in Mountain time
