= Chris Ball =

American football player and coach (born 1963)

Current position
- Title: Defensive Analyst
- Team: Missouri
- Conference: SEC

Biographical details
- Born: May 7, 1963 (age 63); St. Louis, Missouri, U.S.

Playing career
- 1982–1986: Missouri Western
- Position: Defensive back

Coaching career (HC unless noted)
- 1986–1987: Northeast Missouri State (DB)
- 1987–1988: Akron (GA)
- 1989–1990: Washington State (GA)
- 1991–1994: Coffeyville (DB)
- 1995–1996: Western Oregon State (AHC/DB)
- 1997–1998: Missouri Western (DC)
- 1999: Idaho State (DC)
- 2000–2002: Washington State (DB)
- 2003–2006: Alabama (DB)
- 2007: Pittsburgh (DB)
- 2008–2011: Washington State (AHC/DC/DB)
- 2012–2015: Arizona State (DC/DB)
- 2016–2018: Memphis (DC)
- 2019–2023: Northern Arizona
- 2024–present: Missouri (DA)

Head coaching record
- Overall: 20–30

Christopher Farley Ball (born May 7, 1963) is an American college football coach and former player. He was the head football coach for Northern Arizona University from 2019 to 2023.

Ball served as defensive coordinator for multiple NCAA Division II, Division I FCS, and Division I FBS programs: Missouri Western, Idaho State, Washington State, Arizona State, and Memphis.

== Head coaching record ==
Year	Team	Overall	Conference	Standing	Bowl/playoffs
Northern Arizona Lumberjacks (Big Sky Conference) (2019–2023)
2019	Northern Arizona	4–8	2–6	T–9th	
2020–21	Northern Arizona	3–2	3–2	T–3rd	
2021	Northern Arizona	5–6	4–4	T–7th	
2022	Northern Arizona	3–8	2–6	T–8th	
2023	Northern Arizona	5–6	5–3	T-4th	
Northern Arizona:		20–30	16–21		
Total:		20–30			
