= Rob Tenyer =

American football coach (born c. 1973)

Biographical details
- Born: c. 1973 (age 52–53)
- Education: Olivet College (1995)

Playing career
- 1992–1995: Olivet
- 1996: Landsberg Express
- Position: Quarterback

Coaching career (HC unless noted)
- 1995: St. Clair HS (MI) (freshman)
- 1996: Landsberg Express (OC)
- 1997: California (PA) (GA)
- 1998: Centre (GA)
- 1999–2000: Centre (ST/QB)
- 2001–2010: Morehead State (RB)
- 2011–2012: Morehead State (OC/RB)
- 2013–2023: Morehead State

Head coaching record
- Overall: 47–73

Rob Tenyer (born c. 1973) is an American college football coach. He was the head football coach for Morehead State University from 2013 to 2023.

Tenyer also coached for St. Clair High School, California (PA), and Centre.

== Head coaching record ==
Year	Team	Overall	Conference	Standing	Bowl/playoffs
Morehead State Eagles (Pioneer Football League) (2013–2023)
2013	Morehead State	3–9	3–5	7th	
2014	Morehead State	4–8	3–5	T–7th	
2015	Morehead State	7–4	6–2	3rd	
2016	Morehead State	4–7	3–5	T–7th	
2017	Morehead State	4–7	3–5	T–8th	
2018	Morehead State	3–8	2–6	T–7th	
2019	Morehead State	5–7	3–5	7th	
2020–21	Morehead State	4–3	4–2	T–3rd	
2021	Morehead State	7–4	6–2	T–3rd	
2022	Morehead State	2–9	1–7	10th	
2023	Morehead State	4–7	3–5	7th	
Morehead State:		47–73	37–49		
Total:		47–73			
