= 2020 Valparaiso University football team =

American college football season

2020 Valparaiso University football
- Conference: Pioneer Football League
- Record: 4–2 (4–2 PFL)
- Head coach: Landon Fox (2nd season)
- Offensive coordinator: Chris Limbach (2nd season)
- Defensive coordinator: Brian Dougherty (2nd season)
- Home stadium: Brown Field

2020 Pioneer Football League standings
| | Conf. | | | Overall |
| Team | W | | L | W | | L |
|---|---|---|---|---|---|---|
| Davidson $^ | 4 | – | 1 | 4 | – | 3 |
| Valparaiso | 4 | – | 2 | 4 | – | 2 |
| San Diego | 4 | – | 2 | 4 | – | 2 |
| Morehead State | 4 | – | 2 | 4 | – | 3 |
| Drake | 2 | – | 3 | 2 | – | 3 |
| Stetson | 0 | – | 4 | 0 | – | 4 |
| Butler | 0 | – | 6 | 0 | – | 6 |
| Presbyterian | 0 | – | 0 | 4 | – | 3 |
$ – Conference champion; ^ – FCS playoff participant; Notes: Due to COVID-19, the Pioneer Football League suspended the fall 2020 football season. Dayton and Marist opted out of the spring season. Presbyterian played a full PFL schedule, but was ineligible for the conference title, and its games were not counted in PFL standings.; Rankings from STATS Poll

The 2020 Valparaiso University football team represented Valparaiso University in the 2020–21 NCAA Division I FCS football season. They were led by second-year head coach Landon Fox and played their home games at Brown Field. They competed in the Pioneer Football League.

== Schedule ==
Valparaiso's games scheduled against North Dakota and Central Connecticut were canceled on July 27 due to the Pioneer Football League's decision to play a conference-only schedule due to the COVID-19 pandemic.

| Date | Time | Opponent | Site | TV | Result | Attendance |
|---|---|---|---|---|---|---|
| March 13 | 11:00 a.m. | at Butler | Bud and Jackie Sellick Bowl; Indianapolis, IN (Hoosier Helmet Trophy) | | W 24–14 | |
| March 20 | 1:00 p.m. | Drake | Brown Field; Valparaiso, IN | | L 6–17 | |
| March 27 | 1:00 p.m. | Butler | Brown Field; Valparaiso, IN (Hoosier Helmet Trophy) | | W 28–25 | |
| April 3 | 1:00 p.m. | at Drake | Drake Stadium; Des Moines, IA | | W 10–7 | |
| April 10 | 11:00 a.m. | at Morehead State | Jayne Stadium; Morehead, KY | ESPN+ | L 24–28 | |
| April 17 | 1:00 p.m. | San Diego | Brown Field; Valparaiso, IN | | W 20–19 | |
Rankings from STATS Poll released prior to the game; All times are in Central time
