= 2020 Weber State Wildcats football team =

American college football season

2020 Weber State Wildcats football

Big Sky champion

FCS Playoffs First Round, L 31–34 vs. Southern Illinois
- Conference: Big Sky Conference

Ranking
- STATS: No. 3
- FCS Coaches: No. 3
- Record: 5–1 (5–0 Big Sky)
- Head coach: Jay Hill (7th season)
- Offensive coordinator: Matt Hammer (1st season)
- Home stadium: Stewart Stadium

2020 Big Sky Conference football standings
	Conf.			Overall
Team	W		L	W		L
No. 9 Weber State $^	5	–	0	5	–	1
No. 10 Eastern Washington ^	5	–	1	5	–	2
No. 14 UC Davis	3	–	2	3	–	2
Northern Arizona	3	–	2	3	–	2
Idaho State	2	–	4	2	–	4
Idaho	2	–	4	2	–	4
Southern Utah	1	–	5	1	–	5
Cal Poly‡	0	–	3	0	–	3
Montana†		–		2	–	0
Portland State†		–		0	–	1
$ – Conference champion; ^ – FCS playoff participant; Notes: Due to COVID-19, the Big Sky suspended the fall 2020 football season. Montana State, Northern Colorado, and Sacramento State opted out of the spring season. † – Montana and Portland State opted out of the conference season, but scheduled non-conference games. ‡ – Cal Poly opted out of the remainder of the spring season on March 29, 2021.; Rankings from STATS Poll

The 2020 Weber State Wildcats football team represented Weber State University in the 2020–21 NCAA Division I FCS football season. The Wildcats were led by seventh-year head coach Jay Hill and played their games at Stewart Stadium as members of the Big Sky Conference.

== Preseason ==
=== Polls ===
On July 23, 2020, during the virtual Big Sky Kickoff, the Wildcats were predicted to finish first in the Big Sky by both the coaches and media.

== Schedule ==
Date	Time	Opponent	Rank	Site	TV	Result	Attendance
February 27	4:00 p.m.	at Idaho State	No. 4	Holt Arena; Pocatello, ID	Pluto TV	W 49–21	2,211
March 13	1:00 p.m.	No. 23 UC Davis	No. 2	Stewart Stadium; Ogden, UT	KJZZ	W 18–13	4,322
March 27	1:00 p.m.	Northern Arizona	No. 3	Stewart Stadium; Ogden, UT	KJZZ	W 28–23	4,218
April 3	2:00 p.m.	at Southern Utah	No. 3	Eccles Coliseum; Cedar City, UT (Beehive Bowl)	Pluto TV	W 19–16	2,803
April 10	1:00 p.m.	Idaho State	No. 3	Stewart Stadium; Ogden, UT	KJZZ	W 20–15	4,786
~~April 17~~	~~1:00 p.m.~~	~~at Cal Poly~~		~~Alex G. Spanos Stadium~~; ~~San Luis Obispo, CA~~	~~Pluto TV~~	Canceled (Note: On March 29, 2021, Cal Poly announced that it would opt out of the remainder of the 2021 spring season, citing safety issues related to the COVID-19 pandemic and numerous injuries to players.)	
April 24	4:00 p.m.	No. 14 Southern Illinois	No. 3	Stewart Stadium; Ogden, UT (FCS Playoffs First Round)	ESPN3	L 31–34	4,033
Rankings from STATS Poll released prior to the game; All times are in Mountain time
