= 2020 Butler Bulldogs football team =

American college football season

2020 Butler Bulldogs football
- Conference: Pioneer Football League
- Record: 0–6 (0–6 PFL)
- Head coach: Jeff Voris (15th season)
- Offensive coordinator: Kyle Conner (5th season)
- Defensive coordinator: Joe Cheshire (11th season)
- Home stadium: Bud and Jackie Sellick Bowl

2020 Pioneer Football League standings
	Conf.			Overall
Team	W		L	W		L
Davidson $^	4	–	1	4	–	3
Valparaiso	4	–	2	4	–	2
San Diego	4	–	2	4	–	2
Morehead State	4	–	2	4	–	3
Drake	2	–	3	2	–	3
Stetson	0	–	4	0	–	4
Butler	0	–	6	0	–	6
Presbyterian	0	–	0	4	–	3
$ – Conference champion; ^ – FCS playoff participant; Notes: Due to COVID-19, the Pioneer Football League suspended the fall 2020 football season. Dayton and Marist opted out of the spring season. Presbyterian played a full PFL schedule, but was ineligible for the conference title, and its games were not counted in PFL standings.; Rankings from STATS Poll

The 2020 Butler Bulldogs football team represented Butler University as a member of the Pioneer Football League (PFL) during the 2020–21 NCAA Division I FCS football season. Led by 15th-year head coach Jeff Voris, Bulldogs compiled an overall record of 0–6 with an identical mark in conference play, placing seventh in the PFL. Butler played home games at the Bud and Jackie Sellick Bowl in Indianapolis.

== Schedule ==
Butler's games scheduled against South Dakota State, DePauw, and Taylor were canceled on July 27 due to the Pioneer Football League's decision to play a conference-only schedule due to the COVID-19 pandemic.

Date	Time	Opponent	Site	TV	Result	Attendance
March 13	12:00 p.m.	Valparaiso	Bud and Jackie Sellick Bowl; Indianapolis, IN (Hoosier Helmet Trophy)		L 14–24	
March 20		at San Diego	Torero Stadium; San Diego, CA		L 13–27	
March 27	2:00 p.m.	at Valparaiso	Brown Field; Valparaiso, IN		L 25–28	
April 3	3:00 p.m.	Morehead State	Bud and Jackie Sellick Bowl; Indianapolis, IN		L 14–35	
April 10	12:00 p.m.	Drake	Bud and Jackie Sellick Bowl; Indianapolis, IN		L 7–33	
April 17	4:00 p.m.	at Morehead State	Jayne Stadium; Morehead, KY	ESPN+	L 18–28	
Rankings from STATS Poll released prior to the game; All times are in Eastern time
