= 2020 Stetson Hatters football team =

American college football season

2020 Stetson Hatters football
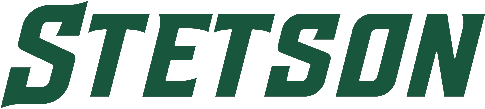
- Conference: Pioneer Football League
- Record: 0–4 (0–4 PFL)
- Head coach: Roger Hughes (8th season)
- Offensive coordinator: Stan Clayton (3rd season)
- Defensive coordinator: Steve Davis (1st season)
- Home stadium: Spec Martin Stadium

2020 Pioneer Football League standings
	Conf.			Overall
Team	W		L	W		L
Davidson $^	4	–	1	4	–	3
Valparaiso	4	–	2	4	–	2
San Diego	4	–	2	4	–	2
Morehead State	4	–	2	4	–	3
Drake	2	–	3	2	–	3
Stetson	0	–	4	0	–	4
Butler	0	–	6	0	–	6
Presbyterian	0	–	0	4	–	3
$ – Conference champion; ^ – FCS playoff participant; Notes: Due to COVID-19, the Pioneer Football League suspended the fall 2020 football season. Dayton and Marist opted out of the spring season. Presbyterian played a full PFL schedule, but was ineligible for the conference title, and its games were not counted in PFL standings.; Rankings from STATS Poll

The 2020 Stetson Hatters football team represented Stetson University as a member of the Pioneer Football League (PFL) during the 2020–21 NCAA Division I FCS football season. Led by Roger Hughes in his eighth and final season as head coach, the Hatters compiled an overall record of 0–4 with all games played against conference opponents, placing sixth in the PFL. Stetson played home games at Spec Martin Stadium on DeLand, Florida.

== Schedule ==
Stetson released their full football schedule on February 25, 2020. The Hatters had games scheduled against Ave Maria (September 5), Louisiana College (September 12), and Presbyterian (October 3), which were later canceled before the start of the 2020 season.

Date	Time	Opponent	Site	TV	Result	Attendance
March 13	1:00 p.m.	Davidson	Spec Martin Stadium; DeLand, FL		L 20–26	
March 20	12:00 p.m.	at Morehead State	Jayne Stadium; Morehead, KY	ESPN+	L 14–31	
April 3	1:00 p.m.	Presbyterian	Spec Martin Stadium; DeLand, FL	ESPN+	L 3–26	
April 10		at San Diego	Torero Stadium; San Diego, CA		L 10–34	
April 17	1:00 p.m.	at Davidson	Richardson Stadium; Davidson, NC		Canceled	
All times are in Eastern time
