= 2020 Drake Bulldogs football team =

American college football season

2020 Drake Bulldogs football
- Conference: Pioneer Football League
- Record: 2–3 (2–3 PFL)
- Head coach: Todd Stepsis (2nd season)
- Offensive coordinator: Kirk Wherritt (1st season)
- Defensive coordinator: Allen Smith (2nd season)
- Co-defensive coordinator: Willie Cashmore (2nd season)
- Home stadium: Drake Stadium

Uniform
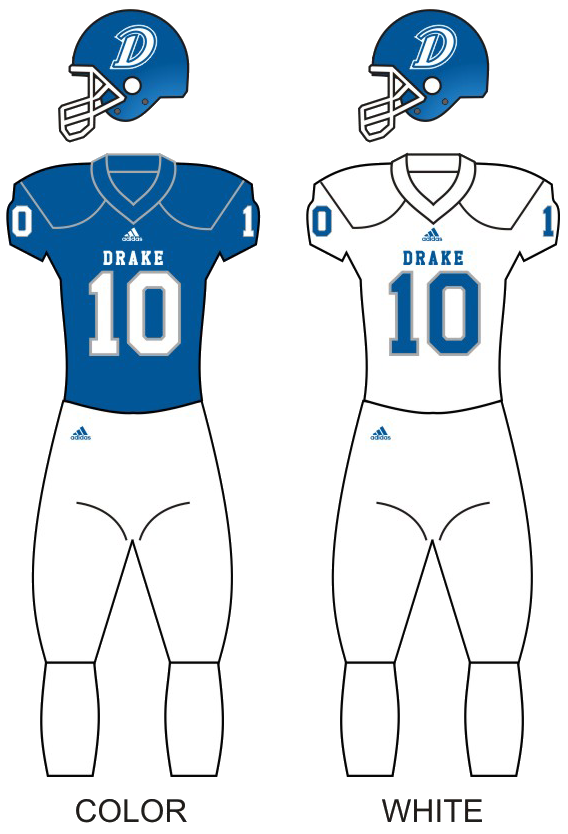

2020 Pioneer Football League standings
	Conf.			Overall
Team	W		L	W		L
Davidson $^	4	–	1	4	–	3
Valparaiso	4	–	2	4	–	2
San Diego	4	–	2	4	–	2
Morehead State	4	–	2	4	–	3
Drake	2	–	3	2	–	3
Stetson	0	–	4	0	–	4
Butler	0	–	6	0	–	6
Presbyterian	0	–	0	4	–	3
$ – Conference champion; ^ – FCS playoff participant; Notes: Due to COVID-19, the Pioneer Football League suspended the fall 2020 football season. Dayton and Marist opted out of the spring season. Presbyterian played a full PFL schedule, but was ineligible for the conference title, and its games were not counted in PFL standings.; Rankings from STATS Poll

The 2020 Drake Bulldogs football team represented Drake University as a member of the Pioneer Football League (PFL) during the 2020–21 NCAA Division I FCS football season. The season was suspended in the fall of 2020 because of the COVID-19 pandemic and played in the spring of 2021. Led by second-year head coach Todd Stepsis, the Bulldogs compiled an overall record of 2–3 with an identical mark in conference play, placing fifth in the PFL. The team played its home games at Drake Stadium in Des Moines, Iowa.

== Schedule ==
Drake had a game scheduled against Hastings on September 3, which was later canceled before the start of the 2020 season. A replacement game, scheduled for the same day, was announced against Black Hills State on July 14. On July 27, that replacement game, along with Drake's scheduled games against North Dakota State and Dixie State, were canceled due to the Pioneer Football League's decision to play a conference-only schedule due to the COVID-19 pandemic. In August, the entire schedule was pushed to spring due to the pandemic. On December 17, the PFL announced its revised spring football season schedule, which included Presbyterian, who were originally not scheduled to move into the PFL until the 2021–22 season.

Following the decisions by Marist and Dayton to opt out of a spring season, the PFL released another schedule in February 2021.

Date	Time	Opponent	Site	Result
March 13	1:00 p.m.	San Diego	Drake Stadium; Des Moines, IA	L 10–13
March 20	1:00 p.m.	at Valparaiso	Brown Field; Valparaiso, IN	W 17–6
April 3	1:00 p.m.	Valparaiso	Drake Stadium; Des Moines, IA	L 7–10
April 10	11:00 a.m.	at Butler	Bud and Jackie Sellick Bowl; Indianapolis, IN	W 33–7
April 17	2:00 p.m.	Presbyterian	Drake Stadium; Des Moines, IA	L 24–28
All times are in Central time
