= 2020 San Diego Toreros football team =

American college football season

2020 San Diego Toreros football
- Conference: Pioneer Football League
- Record: 4–2 (4–2 PFL)
- Head coach: Dale Lindsey (8th season)
- Defensive coordinator: Bobby Jay (3rd season)
- Home stadium: Torero Stadium

2020 Pioneer Football League standings
	Conf.			Overall
Team	W		L	W		L
Davidson $^	4	–	1	4	–	3
Valparaiso	4	–	2	4	–	2
San Diego	4	–	2	4	–	2
Morehead State	4	–	2	4	–	3
Drake	2	–	3	2	–	3
Stetson	0	–	4	0	–	4
Butler	0	–	6	0	–	6
Presbyterian	0	–	0	4	–	3
$ – Conference champion; ^ – FCS playoff participant; Notes: Due to COVID-19, the Pioneer Football League suspended the fall 2020 football season. Dayton and Marist opted out of the spring season. Presbyterian played a full PFL schedule, but was ineligible for the conference title, and its games were not counted in PFL standings.; Rankings from STATS Poll

The 2020 San Diego Toreros football team represented the University of San Diego as a member of the Pioneer Football League (PFL) during the 2020–21 NCAA Division I FCS football season. Led by eighth-year head coach Dale Lindsey, the Toreros compiled an overall record of 4–2 with an identical mark in conference play, placing in a three-way tie for second in the PFL. The team played home games at Torero Stadium in San Diego.

== Schedule ==
San Diego released their schedule on February 12, 2020. The Toreros had a game scheduled against Georgetown (November 21), but the game was canceled on July 13 due to the Patriot League's decision to cancel fall sports due to the COVID-19 pandemic. San Diego's games scheduled against UC Davis (September 5) and Cal Poly (September 19) were canceled on July 27 due to the Pioneer Football League's decision to play a conference-only schedule due to COVID-19.

Date	Time	Opponent	Site	TV	Result	Attendance
March 13	11:00 a.m.	at Drake	Drake Stadium; Des Moines, IA		W 13–10	
March 20		Butler	Torero Stadium; San Diego, CA		W 27–13	
March 27	8:00 a.m.	at Presbyterian	Bailey Memorial Stadium; Clinton, SC	ESPN+	W 24–21	
April 3	12:00 p.m.	Davidson	Torero Stadium; San Diego, CA		L 25–31	
April 10		Stetson	Torero Stadium; San Diego, CA		W 34–10	
April 17	11:00 a.m.	at Valparaiso	Brown Field; Valparaiso, IN		L 19–20	
Rankings from STATS Poll released prior to the game; All times are in Pacific time
