= 2020 Davidson Wildcats football team =

American college football season

2020 Davidson Wildcats football

Pioneer Football League champion

NCAA Division I First Round, L 14–49 vs. Jacksonsville State
- Conference: Pioneer Football League
- Record: 4–3 (4–1 PFL)
- Head coach: Scott Abell (3rd season)
- Defensive coordinator: Jon Berlin (3rd season)
- Home stadium: Richardson Stadium

2020 Pioneer Football League standings
	Conf.			Overall
Team	W		L	W		L
Davidson $^	4	–	1	4	–	3
Valparaiso	4	–	2	4	–	2
San Diego	4	–	2	4	–	2
Morehead State	4	–	2	4	–	3
Drake	2	–	3	2	–	3
Stetson	0	–	4	0	–	4
Butler	0	–	6	0	–	6
Presbyterian	0	–	0	4	–	3
$ – Conference champion; ^ – FCS playoff participant; Notes: Due to COVID-19, the Pioneer Football League suspended the fall 2020 football season. Dayton and Marist opted out of the spring season. Presbyterian played a full PFL schedule, but was ineligible for the conference title, and its games were not counted in PFL standings.; Rankings from STATS Poll

The 2020 Davidson Wildcats football team represented Davidson College in the 2020–21 NCAA Division I FCS football season. They were led by third-year head coach Scott Abell and played their home games at Richardson Stadium. They competed as a member of the Pioneer Football League.

== Schedule ==
Davidson formally released their football schedule on June 1, 2020. The Wildcats' games scheduled against Campbell, Barton, and Middle Georgia State were canceled on July 27 due to the Pioneer Football League's decision to play a conference-only schedule due to the COVID-19 pandemic.

Date	Time	Opponent	Site	TV	Result	Attendance
February 20	1:30 p.m.	at Elon*	Rhodes Stadium; Elon, NC	FloFootball	L 23–26	
March 13	1:00 p.m.	at Stetson	Spec Martin Stadium; DeLand, FL		W 26–20	
March 20	1:00 p.m.	Presbyterian	Richardson Stadium; Davidson, NC		W 41–24	
March 27	12:00 p.m.	Morehead State	Richardson Stadium; Davidson, NC		W 24–21	
April 3	3:00 p.m.	at San Diego	Torero Stadium; San Diego, CA		W 31–25	
April 10	11:00 a.m.	at Presbyterian	Bailey Memorial Stadium; Clinton, SC	ESPN+	L 24–29	
April 17	1:00 p.m.	Stetson	Richardson Stadium; Davidson, NC		Canceled	
April 24	2:00 p.m.	at No. 8 Jacksonville State*	JSU Stadium; Jacksonville, AL (NCAA Division I First Round)	ESPN3	L 14–49	
*Non-conference game; Rankings from STATS Poll released prior to the game; All times are in Eastern time
