= 2020 Presbyterian Blue Hose football team =

American college football season

2020 Presbyterian Blue Hose football
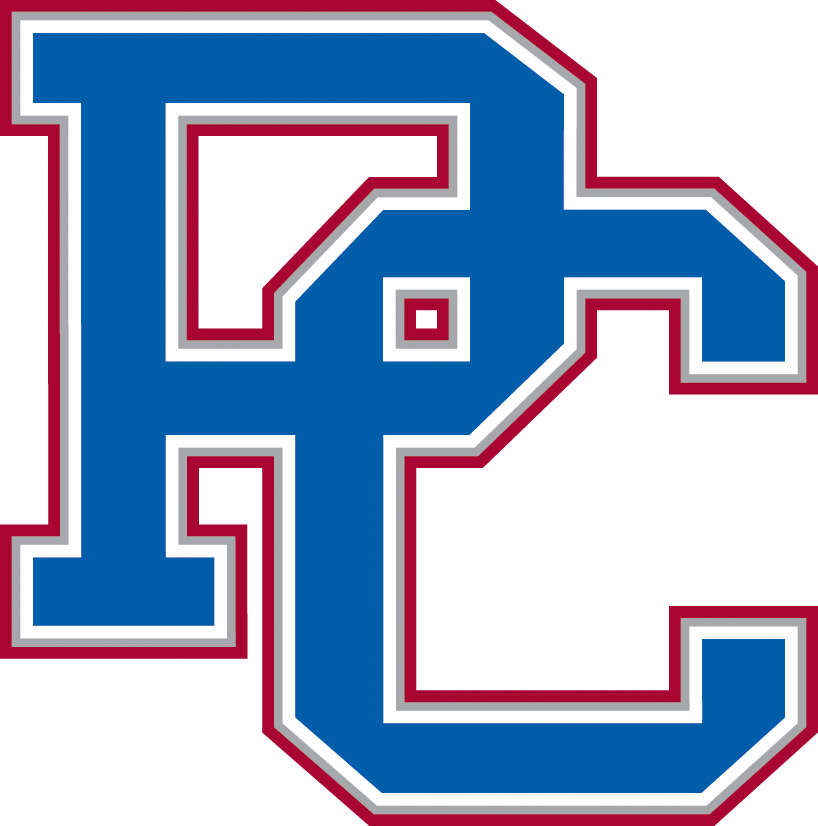
- Conference: Independent
- Record: 4–3
- Head coach: Tommy Spangler (4th season of stint, 10th overall season)
- Defensive coordinator: Roland Matthews (1st season)
- Home stadium: Bailey Memorial Stadium

2020 Pioneer Football League standings
	Conf.			Overall
Team	W		L	W		L
Davidson $^	4	–	1	4	–	3
Valparaiso	4	–	2	4	–	2
San Diego	4	–	2	4	–	2
Morehead State	4	–	2	4	–	3
Drake	2	–	3	2	–	3
Stetson	0	–	4	0	–	4
Butler	0	–	6	0	–	6
Presbyterian	0	–	0	4	–	3
$ – Conference champion; ^ – FCS playoff participant; Notes: Due to COVID-19, the Pioneer Football League suspended the fall 2020 football season. Dayton and Marist opted out of the spring season. Presbyterian played a full PFL schedule, but was ineligible for the conference title, and its games were not counted in PFL standings.; Rankings from STATS Poll

The 2020 Presbyterian Blue Hose football team represented Presbyterian College in the 2020–21 NCAA Division I FCS football season as a technical FCS independent but in a scheduling agreement with the Pioneer Football League (PFL), which it fully joined in July 2021. Under the agreement, Presbyterian was not eligible for the PFL title, but its players and coaches were eligible for individual PFL honors. They were led by tenth-year head coach Tommy Spangler, in his second stint as Presbyterian's head coach, as he coached the Blue Hose from 2001 to 2006 and resumed in 2017. The Blue Hose play their home games at Bailey Memorial Stadium.

On March 4, it was announced that Roland Matthews would be promoted to defensive coordinator after spending four years as defensive line coach.

== Schedule ==
Presbyterian's games scheduled against Morehead State (September 5), Johnson C. Smith (September 12), Virginia–Wise (September 19), Stetson (October 3), Merrimack (November 14), and Virginia–Lynchburg (November 21), were all canceled before the start of the 2020 season.

Date	Time	Opponent	Site	TV	Result	Attendance
March 6	1:00 p.m.	at Gardner–Webb	Ernest W. Spangler Stadium; Boiling Springs, NC	ESPN+	L 24–31 ^{2OT}	
March 13	12:00 p.m.	Morehead State	Bailey Memorial Stadium; Clinton, SC	ESPN+	W 31–16	
March 20	1:00 p.m.	at Davidson	Richardson Stadium; Davidson, NC		L 24–41	
March 27	11:00 a.m.	San Diego	Bailey Memorial Stadium; Clinton, SC	ESPN+	L 21–24	
April 3	1:00 p.m.	at Stetson	Spec Martin Stadium; DeLand, FL	ESPN+	W 26–3	
April 10	11:00 a.m.	Davidson	Bailey Memorial Stadium; Clinton, SC	ESPN+	W 29–24	
April 17	3:00 p.m.	at Drake	Drake Stadium; Des Moines, IA		W 28–24	
Rankings from STATS Poll released prior to the game; All times are in Eastern time
