= 2020 Northern Arizona Lumberjacks football team =

American college football season

2020 Northern Arizona Lumberjacks football
- Conference: Big Sky Conference
- Record: 3–2 (3–2 Big Sky)
- Head coach: Chris Ball (2nd season)
- Offensive coordinator: Aaron Pflugrad (3rd season)
- Defensive coordinator: Jerry Partridge (2nd season)
- Home stadium: Walkup Skydome

2020 Big Sky Conference football standings
	Conf.			Overall
Team	W		L	W		L
No. 9 Weber State $^	5	–	0	5	–	1
No. 10 Eastern Washington ^	5	–	1	5	–	2
No. 14 UC Davis	3	–	2	3	–	2
Northern Arizona	3	–	2	3	–	2
Idaho State	2	–	4	2	–	4
Idaho	2	–	4	2	–	4
Southern Utah	1	–	5	1	–	5
Cal Poly‡	0	–	3	0	–	3
Montana†		–		2	–	0
Portland State†		–		0	–	1
$ – Conference champion; ^ – FCS playoff participant; Notes: Due to COVID-19, the Big Sky suspended the fall 2020 football season. Montana State, Northern Colorado, and Sacramento State opted out of the spring season. † – Montana and Portland State opted out of the conference season, but scheduled non-conference games. ‡ – Cal Poly opted out of the remainder of the spring season on March 29, 2021.; Rankings from STATS Poll

The 2020 Northern Arizona Lumberjacks football team represented Northern Arizona University in the 2020–21 NCAA Division I FCS football season. They were led by 2nd-year head coach Chris Ball and played their home games at the Walkup Skydome. They played as members of the Big Sky Conference.

== Preseason ==
=== Polls ===
On July 23, 2020, during the virtual Big Sky Kickoff, the Lumberjacks were predicted to finish seventh in the Big Sky by the coaches and ninth by the media.

== Schedule ==
Northern Arizona released their full schedule on January 13, 2020. The Lumberjacks had a game scheduled against Arizona State, which was later canceled before the start of the 2020 season.

Date	Time	Opponent	Site	TV	Result	Attendance
February 27	1:00 pm	Southern Utah	Walkup Skydome; Flagstaff, AZ (Grand Canyon Rivalry)	Pluto TV	W 34–33	
March 6	2:00 pm	at No. 22 Eastern Washington	Roos Field; Cheney, WA		L 13–45	
March 27	1:00 pm	at No. 3 Weber State	Stewart Stadium; Ogden, UT		L 23–28	
~~April 3~~	~~1:00 pm~~	~~Cal Poly~~	~~Walkup Skydome~~; ~~Flagstaff, AZ~~		Canceled (Note: On March 29, 2021, Cal Poly announced that it would opt out of the remainder of the 2021 spring season, citing safety issues related to the COVID-19 pandemic and numerous injuries to players.)	
April 10	4:00 pm	at Southern Utah	Eccles Coliseum; Cedar City, UT (Grand Canyon Rivalry)		W 28–20	
April 17	2:00 pm	Idaho	Walkup Skydome; Flagstaff, AZ		W 19–9	
Rankings from STATS Poll released prior to the game; All times are in Mountain time

Despite being a Big Sky opponent, the game against Eastern Washington on September 19 will not count towards the Big Sky Conference standings.
