= 2020 Morehead State Eagles football team =

American college football season

2020 Morehead State Eagles football
- Conference: Pioneer Football League
- Record: 4–3 (4–2 PFL)
- Head coach: Rob Tenyer (8th season)
- Defensive coordinator: Tony Brinson (2nd season)
- Home stadium: Jayne Stadium

2020 Pioneer Football League standings
	Conf.			Overall
Team	W		L	W		L
Davidson $^	4	–	1	4	–	3
Valparaiso	4	–	2	4	–	2
San Diego	4	–	2	4	–	2
Morehead State	4	–	2	4	–	3
Drake	2	–	3	2	–	3
Stetson	0	–	4	0	–	4
Butler	0	–	6	0	–	6
Presbyterian	0	–	0	4	–	3
$ – Conference champion; ^ – FCS playoff participant; Notes: Due to COVID-19, the Pioneer Football League suspended the fall 2020 football season. Dayton and Marist opted out of the spring season. Presbyterian played a full PFL schedule, but was ineligible for the conference title, and its games were not counted in PFL standings.; Rankings from STATS Poll

The 2020 Morehead State Eagles football team represented Morehead State University in the 2020–21 NCAA Division I FCS football season. They were led by eighth-year head coach Rob Tenyer and play their home games at Jayne Stadium. They competed as members of the Pioneer Football League.

== Schedule ==
Morehead State's games scheduled against Presbyterian, Montana, and St. Andrews were canceled on July 27 due to the Pioneer Football League's decision to play a conference-only schedule due to the COVID-19 pandemic.

Date	Time	Opponent	Site	TV	Result	Attendance
February 20	12:00 p.m.	at No. 2 James Madison*	Bridgeforth Stadium; Harrisonburg, VA	NBCSW/FloFootball	L 0–52	
March 13	12:00 p.m.	at Presbyterian	Bailey Memorial Stadium; Clinton, SC	ESPN+	L 16–31	
March 20	12:00 p.m.	Stetson	Jayne Stadium; Morehead, KY	ESPN+	W 31–14	
March 27	12:00 p.m.	at Davidson	Richardson Stadium; Davidson, NC		L 21–24	
April 3	3:00 p.m.	at Butler	Bud and Jackie Sellick Bowl; Indianapolis, IN		W 35–14	
April 10	12:00 p.m.	Valparaiso	Jayne Stadium; Morehead, KY	ESPN+	W 28–24	
April 17	4:00 p.m.	Butler	Jayne Stadium; Morehead, KY	ESPN+	W 28–18	
*Non-conference game; Rankings from STATS Poll released prior to the game; All times are in Eastern time
