= 2020 Eastern Washington Eagles football team =

American college football season

2020 Eastern Washington Eagles football
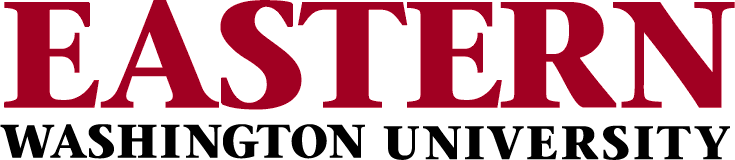

NCAA Division I First Round, L 20–42 vs. North Dakota State
- Conference: Big Sky Conference

Ranking
- STATS: No. 10
- FCS Coaches: No. 11
- Record: 5–2 (5–1 Big Sky)
- Head coach: Aaron Best (4th season)
- Offensive coordinator: Ian Shoemaker (2nd season)
- Offensive scheme: Multiple
- Defensive coordinator: Eti Ena (2nd season)
- Base defense: 4–2–5
- Home stadium: Roos Field

2020 Big Sky Conference football standings
	Conf.			Overall
Team	W		L	W		L
No. 9 Weber State $^	5	–	0	5	–	1
No. 10 Eastern Washington ^	5	–	1	5	–	2
No. 14 UC Davis	3	–	2	3	–	2
Northern Arizona	3	–	2	3	–	2
Idaho State	2	–	4	2	–	4
Idaho	2	–	4	2	–	4
Southern Utah	1	–	5	1	–	5
Cal Poly‡	0	–	3	0	–	3
Montana†		–		2	–	0
Portland State†		–		0	–	1
$ – Conference champion; ^ – FCS playoff participant; Notes: Due to COVID-19, the Big Sky suspended the fall 2020 football season. Montana State, Northern Colorado, and Sacramento State opted out of the spring season. † – Montana and Portland State opted out of the conference season, but scheduled non-conference games. ‡ – Cal Poly opted out of the remainder of the spring season on March 29, 2021.; Rankings from STATS Poll

The 2020 Eastern Washington Eagles football team represented Eastern Washington University as a member of the Big Sky Conference during the 2020–21 NCAA Division I FCS football season. Led by fourth-year head coach Aaron Best, the Eagles played their home games at Roos Field in Cheney, Washington.

== Preseason ==
=== Polls ===
On July 23, 2020, during the virtual Big Sky Kickoff, the Eagles were predicted to finish fourth in the Big Sky by both the coaches and media.

=== Preseason All-Conference Team ===
The Eagles had two players selected to the Preseason All-Conference Team. Senior quarterback Eric Barriere was also selected as the Big Sky Preseason Most Valuable Player.

Eric Barriere – Sr. QB (Preseason Offensive MVP)

Tristen Taylor – Sr. OT

== Schedule ==
Date	Time	Opponent	Rank	Site	TV	Result	Attendance
February 27	3:00 p.m.	at Idaho	No. 12	Kibbie Dome; Moscow, ID	SWX/Pluto TV	L 21–28	2,694
March 6	1:00 p.m.	Northern Arizona	No. 22	Roos Field; Cheney, WA	SWX/Pluto TV	W 45–13	0
March 13	3:05 p.m.	at Idaho State	No. 16	Holt Arena; Pocatello, ID	Pluto TV	W 46–42	2,226
March 27	1:00 p.m.	Cal Poly	No. 12	Roos Field; Cheney, WA	SWX/Pluto TV	W 62–10	0
April 3	1:05 p.m.	at No. 11 UC Davis	No. 9	UC Davis Health Stadium; Davis, CA	Pluto TV	W 32–22	1,720
April 10	1:00 p.m.	Idaho	No. 9	Roos Field; Cheney, WA	SWX/Pluto TV	W 38–31	0
April 24	12:30 p.m.	at No. 6 North Dakota State	No. 9	Fargodome; Fargo, ND (NCAA Division I First Round)	ESPN3	L 20–42	3,587
Rankings from STATS Poll released prior to the game; All times are in Pacific time

Eastern Washington released their initial full schedule on January 11, 2019.

The Eagles were scheduled to play against Florida on September 5 in Gainesville, but this game was canceled on July 30 after the Southeastern Conference moved to a ten-game, conference-only schedule for its teams due to the COVID-19 pandemic.

On August 13, the Big Sky Conference canceled all fall sports, including football, and announced that these sports would begin competition in the spring of 2021 due to the ongoing pandemic.

On November 4, the Big Sky Conference announced a six game, conference-only football schedule for participating programs that would begin in February. Due to this shortened season, previously scheduled games against Western Illinois, Northern Arizona, Southern Utah, Northern Colorado, and Weber State were not rescheduled.

On January 15, 2021, Montana, Montana State, Northern Colorado, Portland State, and Sacramento State all opted out of the 2020 spring conference season. The Big Sky Conference announced on the same day that they would move forward with a six-game conference season with the remaining eight teams that had not opted out of the spring season. On January 25, 2021, the Big Sky Conference announced its final spring football schedule.

== Ranking movements ==
Ranking movements Legend: ██ Increase in ranking ██ Decrease in ranking
	Week													
Poll	Pre	1	2	3	4	5	6	7	8	9	10	11	12	Final
STATS	18	12	22	16	15	12	9	9	8	9				10
Coaches					12	11	9	9	8	8				11
