= 2020 Montana Grizzlies football team =

American college football season

2020 Montana Grizzlies football
- Conference: Big Sky Conference
- Record: 2–0 (0–0 Big Sky)
- Head coach: Bobby Hauck (10th season)
- Offensive coordinator: Timm Rosenbach (4th season)
- Offensive scheme: Spread
- Defensive coordinator: Kent Baer (3rd season)
- Base defense: 3–3–5
- Home stadium: Washington–Grizzly Stadium

2020 Big Sky Conference football standings
	Conf.			Overall
Team	W		L	W		L
No. 9 Weber State $^	5	–	0	5	–	1
No. 10 Eastern Washington ^	5	–	1	5	–	2
No. 14 UC Davis	3	–	2	3	–	2
Northern Arizona	3	–	2	3	–	2
Idaho State	2	–	4	2	–	4
Idaho	2	–	4	2	–	4
Southern Utah	1	–	5	1	–	5
Cal Poly‡	0	–	3	0	–	3
Montana†		–		2	–	0
Portland State†		–		0	–	1
$ – Conference champion; ^ – FCS playoff participant; Notes: Due to COVID-19, the Big Sky suspended the fall 2020 football season. Montana State, Northern Colorado, and Sacramento State opted out of the spring season. † – Montana and Portland State opted out of the conference season, but scheduled non-conference games. ‡ – Cal Poly opted out of the remainder of the spring season on March 29, 2021.; Rankings from STATS Poll

The 2020 Montana Grizzlies football team represented the University of Montana in the 2020–21 NCAA Division I FCS football season. The Grizzlies were led by head coach Bobby Hauck, in the third season of his current stint and the tenth overall season leading the team, as he previously was head coach from 2003 to 2009. They played their home games on campus at Washington–Grizzly Stadium in Missoula, Montana as a charter member of the Big Sky Conference.

== Preseason ==
=== Polls ===
On July 23, 2020, during the virtual Big Sky Kickoff, the Grizzlies were predicted to finish second in the Big Sky by both the coaches and media.

== Schedule ==
Montana originally had a game scheduled against Central Washington (September 5), but it was canceled on July 19 due to the GNAC's decision to cancel fall sports due to the COVID-19 pandemic. The Grizzlies' game against Morehead State (September 19) was canceled on July 27 due to the Pioneer Football League's decision to play a conference-only schedule due to the COVID-19 pandemic.

Montana's April 17 game against Portland State will be counted as a non-conference game, even though both schools compete in the Big Sky Conference.

Date	Time	Opponent	Site	TV	Result	Attendance
April 10	11:00 a.m.	Central Washington*	Washington–Grizzly Stadium; Missoula, MT		W 59–3	
April 17	11:00 a.m.	Portland State*	Washington–Grizzly Stadium; Missoula, MT		W 48–7	
*Non-conference game; Rankings from STATS Poll released prior to the game; All times are in Mountain time
