= 2020 Idaho Vandals football team =

American college football season

2020 Idaho Vandals football
- Conference: Big Sky Conference
- Record: 2–4 (2–4 Big Sky)
- Head coach: Paul Petrino (8th season)
- Offensive coordinator: Kris Cinkovich (8th season)
- Offensive scheme: Multiple
- Defensive coordinator: Mike Breske (6th season)
- Base defense: Multiple 3–4
- Home stadium: Kibbie Dome

2020 Big Sky Conference football standings
	Conf.			Overall
Team	W		L	W		L
No. 9 Weber State $^	5	–	0	5	–	1
No. 10 Eastern Washington ^	5	–	1	5	–	2
No. 14 UC Davis	3	–	2	3	–	2
Northern Arizona	3	–	2	3	–	2
Idaho State	2	–	4	2	–	4
Idaho	2	–	4	2	–	4
Southern Utah	1	–	5	1	–	5
Cal Poly‡	0	–	3	0	–	3
Montana†		–		2	–	0
Portland State†		–		0	–	1
$ – Conference champion; ^ – FCS playoff participant; Notes: Due to COVID-19, the Big Sky suspended the fall 2020 football season. Montana State, Northern Colorado, and Sacramento State opted out of the spring season. † – Montana and Portland State opted out of the conference season, but scheduled non-conference games. ‡ – Cal Poly opted out of the remainder of the spring season on March 29, 2021.; Rankings from STATS Poll

The 2020 Idaho Vandals football team represented the University of Idaho as a member of the Big Sky Conference during the 2020–21 NCAA Division I FCS football season. Led by seventh-year head coach Paul Petrino, the Vandals played their home games on campus at the Kibbie Dome in Moscow, Idaho.

Due to the COVID-19 pandemic, the season was delayed and started in late February 2021.

== Preseason ==
=== Polls ===
On July 23, 2020, during the virtual Big Sky Kickoff, the Vandals were predicted to finish ninth in the Big Sky by the coaches and eighth by the media.

== Schedule ==
Idaho released their full schedule on November 7, 2019. The Vandals had games scheduled against Western Oregon and Washington State, which were later canceled before the start of the 2020 season.

Due to the COVID-19 pandemic, the season was delayed and started in late February 2021.

Date	Time	Opponent	Rank	Site	TV	Result	Attendance
February 27, 2021	4:00 p.m.	No. 12 Eastern Washington		Kibbie Dome; Moscow, ID	SWX	W 28–21	2,694
March 6	1:00 p.m.	UC Davis	No. 19	Kibbie Dome; Moscow, ID	Pluto TV	L 17–27	1,823
March 27	1:00 p.m.	Southern Utah		Kibbie Dome; Moscow, ID	Pluto TV	W 33–32	1,947
April 3		at Idaho State	No. 24	Holt Arena; Pocatello, ID (rivalry)	Pluto TV	L 22–24	2,797
April 10	2:00 p.m.	at No. 9 Eastern Washington		Roos Field; Cheney, WA	SWX	L 31–38	0
April 17	2:00 p.m.	at Northern Arizona		Walkup Skydome; Flagstaff, AZ	Pluto TV	L 9–19	0
Rankings from STATS Poll released prior to the game; All times are in Mountain time
