= 2020 Portland State Vikings football team =

American college football season

2020 Portland State Vikings football
- Conference: Big Sky Conference
- Record: 0–1 (0–0 Big Sky)
- Head coach: Bruce Barnum (6th season)
- Offensive coordinator: Matt Leunen (3rd season)
- Offensive scheme: Pro spread
- Defensive coordinator: Payam Saadat (3rd season)
- Base defense: 3–3–5
- Home stadium: Hillsboro Stadium

2020 Big Sky Conference football standings
	Conf.			Overall
Team	W		L	W		L
No. 9 Weber State $^	5	–	0	5	–	1
No. 10 Eastern Washington ^	5	–	1	5	–	2
No. 14 UC Davis	3	–	2	3	–	2
Northern Arizona	3	–	2	3	–	2
Idaho State	2	–	4	2	–	4
Idaho	2	–	4	2	–	4
Southern Utah	1	–	5	1	–	5
Cal Poly‡	0	–	3	0	–	3
Montana†		–		2	–	0
Portland State†		–		0	–	1
$ – Conference champion; ^ – FCS playoff participant; Notes: Due to COVID-19, the Big Sky suspended the fall 2020 football season. Montana State, Northern Colorado, and Sacramento State opted out of the spring season. † – Montana and Portland State opted out of the conference season, but scheduled non-conference games. ‡ – Cal Poly opted out of the remainder of the spring season on March 29, 2021.; Rankings from STATS Poll

The 2020 Portland State Vikings football team represented Portland State University during the 2020–21 NCAA Division I FCS football season. They were led by sixth-year head coach Bruce Barnum and were scheduled to play their home games at Hillsboro Stadium, though they did not play a home game. They were a member of the Big Sky Conference.

== Preseason ==
=== Polls ===
On July 23, 2020, during the virtual Big Sky Kickoff, the Vikings were predicted to finish eighth in the Big Sky by the coaches and seventh by the media.

== Schedule ==
Portland State had games scheduled against Arizona and Oregon State, which were later canceled before the start of the 2020 season.

The Vikings' April 17 game against Montana was counted as a non-conference game, even though both schools compete in the Big Sky Conference.

Date	Time	Opponent	Site	TV	Result	Attendance
April 17, 2021	10:00 a.m.	at Montana*	Washington–Grizzly Stadium; Missoula, MT		L 7–48	4,569
*Non-conference game; Rankings from STATS Poll released prior to the game; All times are in Pacific time

== Game summaries ==
=== At Montana ===
Portland State Vikings at Montana Grizzlies – Game summary

Quarter	1	2	3	4	Total
Vikings	0	0	7	0	7
Grizzlies	7	20	14	7	48

at Washington–Grizzly Stadium, Missoula, Montana

- Date: April 17, 2021
- Game time: 10:00 a.m. PST/11:00 a.m. MST
- Game attendance: 4,569

Game information
First quarter
- MONT – Xavier Harris 28-yard run (Jack Cooper kick), 5:26. Grizzlies 7–0. Drive: 6 plays, 72 yards, 2:22.

Second quarter

- MONT – Xavier Harris 4-yard run (Jack Cooper kick), 9:51. Grizzlies 14–0. Drive: 9 plays, 95 yards, 4:08.
- MONT – Gabe Sulser 54-yard pass from Camron Humphrey (kick failed), 5:12. Grizzlies 20–0. Drive: 7 plays, 85 yards, 2:40.
- MONT – Samuel Akem 15-yard pass from Camron Humphrey (Carver Gilman kick), 0:09. Grizzlies 27–0. Drive: 6 plays, 40 yards, 0:43.

Third quarter

- PRST – Mataio Talalemotu 73-yard pass from Davis Alexander (Cody Williams kick), 11:55. Grizzlies 27–7. Drive: 2 plays, 76 yards, 0:52.
- MONT – Nick Ostmo 11-yard run (Carver Gilman kick), 6:30. Grizzlies 34–7. Drive: 12 plays, 73 yards, 5:19.
- MONT – Nick Ostmo 6-yard run (Carver Gilman kick), 4:14. Grizzlies 41–7. Drive: 2 plays, 10 yards, 0:36.

Fourth quarter

- MONT – Nick Ostmo 8-yard run (Carver Gilman kick), 12:33. Grizzlies 48–7. Drive: 9 plays, 54 yards, 3:11.

Statistics	PRST	MONT
First downs	12	25
Total yards	293	507
Rushing yards	100	244
Passing yards	193	263
Turnovers	1	1
Time of possession	29:49	30:11

Team	Category	Player	Statistics
Portland State	Passing	Davis Alexander	15/25, 193 yards, TD, INT
Portland State	Rushing	Davis Alexander	10 rushes, 33 yards
Portland State	Receiving	Mataio Talalemotu	4 receptions, 92 yards, TD
Montana	Passing	Camron Humphrey	19/26, 239 yards, 2 TD, INT
Montana	Rushing	Xavier Harris	13 rushes, 109 yards, 2 TD
Montana	Receiving	Gabe Sulser	4 receptions, 83 yards, TD
