= 2020 UC Davis Aggies football team =

American college football season

2020 UC Davis Aggies football
- Conference: Big Sky Conference

Ranking
- STATS: No. 13
- FCS Coaches: No. 12
- Record: 3–2 (3–2 Big Sky)
- Head coach: Dan Hawkins (4th season)
- Offensive coordinator: Tim Plough (4th season)
- Defensive coordinator: Matt Coombs (1st season)
- Captains: Connor Airey; Ulonzo Gilliam Jr.; Kooper Richardson; Bryce Rodgers
- Home stadium: UC Davis Health Stadium

2020 Big Sky Conference football standings
	Conf.			Overall
Team	W		L	W		L
No. 9 Weber State $^	5	–	0	5	–	1
No. 10 Eastern Washington ^	5	–	1	5	–	2
No. 14 UC Davis	3	–	2	3	–	2
Northern Arizona	3	–	2	3	–	2
Idaho State	2	–	4	2	–	4
Idaho	2	–	4	2	–	4
Southern Utah	1	–	5	1	–	5
Cal Poly‡	0	–	3	0	–	3
Montana†		–		2	–	0
Portland State†		–		0	–	1
$ – Conference champion; ^ – FCS playoff participant; Notes: Due to COVID-19, the Big Sky suspended the fall 2020 football season. Montana State, Northern Colorado, and Sacramento State opted out of the spring season. † – Montana and Portland State opted out of the conference season, but scheduled non-conference games. ‡ – Cal Poly opted out of the remainder of the spring season on March 29, 2021.; Rankings from STATS Poll

The 2020 UC Davis football team represented the University of California, Davis as a member of the Big Sky Conference during the 2020–21 NCAA Division I FCS football season. Led by fourth-year head coach Dan Hawkins, UC Davis compiled an overall record of 3–2 with an identical mark in conference play, tying for third place in the Big Sky. The Aggies played home games at UC Davis Health Stadium in Davis, California.

== Preseason ==
=== Polls ===
On July 23, 2020, during the virtual Big Sky Kickoff, the Aggies were predicted to finish sixth in the Big Sky by both the coaches and media.

== Schedule ==
UC Davis's game scheduled against San Diego was canceled on July 27 due to the Pioneer Football League's decision to play a conference-only schedule due to the COVID-19 pandemic.

Date	Time	Opponent	Rank	Site	TV	Result	Attendance
March 6	12:00 p.m.	at No. 19 Idaho		Kibbie Dome; Moscow, ID	Pluto TV	W 27–17	1,823
March 13	12:00 p.m.	at No. 2 Weber State	No. 23	Stewart Stadium; Ogden, UT	KJZZ-TV/Pluto TV	L 13–18	4,322
March 20	1:00 p.m.	Cal Poly	No. 21	UC Davis Health Stadium; Davis, CA (Battle for the Golden Horseshoe)	CW31/Pluto TV	W 73–24	0
March 27		Idaho State	No. 15	UC Davis Health Stadium; Davis, CA	CW31/Pluto TV	W 31–27	0
April 3		No. 9 Eastern Washington	No. 11	UC Davis Health Stadium; Davis, CA	CW31/Pluto TV	L 22–32	1,720
April 10	1:00 p.m	at Cal Poly	No. 13	Alex G. Spanos Stadium; San Luis Obispo, CA (Battle for the Golden Horseshoe)		Canceled (Note: On March 29, 2021, Cal Poly announced that it would opt out of the remainder of the 2021 spring season, citing safety issues related to the COVID-19 pandemic and numerous injuries to players.)	
Rankings from STATS Poll released prior to the game; All times are in Pacific time
