= 2020 Idaho State Bengals football team =

American college football season

2020 Idaho State Bengals football
- Conference: Big Sky Conference
- Record: 2–4 (2–4 Big Sky)
- Head coach: Rob Phenicie (4th season)
- Offensive coordinator: Mike Ferriter (3rd season)
- Defensive coordinator: Roger Cooper (6th season)
- Home stadium: Holt Arena

2020 Big Sky Conference football standings
	Conf.			Overall
Team	W		L	W		L
No. 9 Weber State $^	5	–	0	5	–	1
No. 10 Eastern Washington ^	5	–	1	5	–	2
No. 14 UC Davis	3	–	2	3	–	2
Northern Arizona	3	–	2	3	–	2
Idaho State	2	–	4	2	–	4
Idaho	2	–	4	2	–	4
Southern Utah	1	–	5	1	–	5
Cal Poly‡	0	–	3	0	–	3
Montana†		–		2	–	0
Portland State†		–		0	–	1
$ – Conference champion; ^ – FCS playoff participant; Notes: Due to COVID-19, the Big Sky suspended the fall 2020 football season. Montana State, Northern Colorado, and Sacramento State opted out of the spring season. † – Montana and Portland State opted out of the conference season, but scheduled non-conference games. ‡ – Cal Poly opted out of the remainder of the spring season on March 29, 2021.; Rankings from STATS Poll

The 2020 Idaho State Bengals football team represented Idaho State University in the Big Sky Conference during the 2020–21 NCAA Division I FCS football season. Led by fourth-year head coach Rob Phenicie, the Bengals were 2–4 overall (2–4 in Big Sky, tied for fifth), and played their home games on campus at Holt Arena in Pocatello, Idaho.

Due to the COVID-19 pandemic, the season was delayed and started in late February 2021.

== Preseason ==
=== Polls ===
On July 23, 2020, during the virtual Big Sky Kickoff, the Bengals were predicted to finish eleventh in the Big Sky by both the coaches and media.

== Schedule ==
In late July, Idaho State and New Mexico agreed to move 2020 game from August 29 (week zero) to September 19.

Due to the COVID-19 pandemic, the season was delayed and started in late February 2021.

Date	Time	Opponent	Site	TV	Result	Attendance
February 27, 2021	4:00 p.m.	No. 4 Weber State	Holt Arena; Pocatello, ID	Pluto TV	L 21–49	
March 6	12:00 p.m.	at Southern Utah	Eccles Coliseum; Cedar City, UT	Pluto TV	W 26–24	
March 13	4:00 p.m.	No. 16 Eastern Washington	Holt Arena; Pocatello, ID	Pluto TV	L 42–46	
March 27	2:00 p.m.	at No. 15 UC Davis	UC Davis Health Stadium; Davis, CA		L 27–31	
April 3	4:00 p.m.	No. 24 Idaho	Holt Arena; Pocatello, ID (rivalry)		W 24–22	
April 10	1:00 p.m.	at No. 3 Weber State	Stewart Stadium; Ogden, UT		L 15–20	
Rankings from STATS Poll released prior to the game; All times are in Mountain time
