= 2020 Cal Poly Mustangs football team =

American college football season

2020 Cal Poly Mustangs football
- Conference: Big Sky Conference
- Record: 0–3 (0–3 Big Sky)
- Head coach: Beau Baldwin (1st season)
- Offensive coordinator: Nick Edwards (1st season)
- Offensive scheme: Multiple
- Defensive coordinator: J. C. Sherritt (1st season)
- Base defense: 3–4
- Home stadium: Alex G. Spanos Stadium

2020 Big Sky Conference football standings
	Conf.			Overall
Team	W		L	W		L
No. 9 Weber State $^	5	–	0	5	–	1
No. 10 Eastern Washington ^	5	–	1	5	–	2
No. 14 UC Davis	3	–	2	3	–	2
Northern Arizona	3	–	2	3	–	2
Idaho State	2	–	4	2	–	4
Idaho	2	–	4	2	–	4
Southern Utah	1	–	5	1	–	5
Cal Poly‡	0	–	3	0	–	3
Montana†		–		2	–	0
Portland State†		–		0	–	1
$ – Conference champion; ^ – FCS playoff participant; Notes: Due to COVID-19, the Big Sky suspended the fall 2020 football season. Montana State, Northern Colorado, and Sacramento State opted out of the spring season. † – Montana and Portland State opted out of the conference season, but scheduled non-conference games. ‡ – Cal Poly opted out of the remainder of the spring season on March 29, 2021.; Rankings from STATS Poll

The 2020 Cal Poly Mustangs football team represented California Polytechnic State University, San Luis Obispo as member of the Big Sky Conference during the 2020–21 NCAA Division I FCS football season. Led by first-year head coach Beau Baldwin, the Mustangs compiled an overall record of 0–3 with an identical mark in conference play, placing eighth in the Big Sky. Cal poly played home games at Mustang Stadium in San Luis Obispo, California.

On March 29, 2021, Cal Poly announced that the team would opt out of the remainder of the 2021 spring season, citing safety issues related to the COVID-19 pandemic and numerous injuries to players.

== Schedule ==
Cal Poly released their full schedule on September 20, 2019. The Mustangs had games scheduled against California and San Diego, which were later canceled before the start of the 2020 season.

Games against Northern Arizona (April 3), UC Davis (April 10), and Weber State (April 17) were canceled when the Mustangs opted out of the remainder of the season on March 29, 2021.

Date	Time	Opponent	Site	TV	Result	Attendance
March 13	1:00 p.m.	Southern Utah	Alex G. Spanos Stadium; San Luis Obispo, CA		L 24–34	0
March 20	1:00 p.m.	at No. 21 UC Davis	UC Davis Health Stadium; Davis, CA (Battle for the Golden Horseshoe)		L 24–73	0
March 27	1:00 p.m.	at No. 12 Eastern Washington	Roos Field; Cheney, WA		L 10–62	0
Rankings from STATS Poll released prior to the game; All times are in Pacific time

== Preseason ==
=== Polls ===
On July 23, 2020, during the virtual Big Sky Kickoff, the Mustangs were predicted to finish tenth in the Big Sky by both the coaches and media.
