= Grand Canyon Trophy Game =

American college sports rivalry

- Northern Arizona Lumberjacks Southern Utah Thunderbirds
- First meeting: September 11, 1982; Northern Arizona 36, Southern Utah 15
- Latest meeting: October 31, 2026; Northern Arizona 34, Southern Utah 27
- Trophy: Grand Canyon Trophy

Statistics
- Total meetings: 28
- All-time series: Northern Arizona leads, 18–10
- Largest victory: Northern Arizona 53, Southern Utah 3 (1983 and 1993)
- Longest win streak: Northern Arizona, 5 (2001–2010)
- Current win streak: Northern Arizona, 5 (2021–present)

Locations of Northern Arizona and Southern Utah

The Grand Canyon Trophy Game (also known as the Grand Canyon Rivalry is a series of American college football games, described by some as a rivalry, between the Northern Arizona Lumberjacks and the Southern Utah Thunderbirds. The Grand Canyon Trophy is presented to the winner of the game. The Lumberjacks are the current holder of the trophy.

== Series history ==
Between 1982 and 2011, Northern Arizona and Southern Utah played fifteen times as non-conference opponents. Since 1970, Northern Arizona has been a member of the Big Sky Conference, playing at a Division I level. Southern Utah's division and conference affiliation fluctuated during this time. However, in 2011, the Big Sky conference expanded to 13 football-playing members, and Southern Utah University was extended an all-sports invitation. Since then, the Lumberjacks and Thunderbirds have competed every year. In 2012, the Grand Canyon Trophy was introduced as a traveling trophy that would go to the winner. The trophy was first won by Southern Utah by a score of 35–29. In 2022, Southern Utah left the Big Sky Conference for the Western Athletic Conference. The two schools have scheduled a 12-game home and home series for the 2028 through 2039 seasons. On June 25, 2025, the Big Sky Conference announced that Southern Utah will rejoin the conference effective July 1, 2026.

== Game results ==
Northern Arizona victories	Southern Utah victories

No.	Date	Location	Winner	Score
1	September 11, 1982	Flagstaff, AZ	Northern Arizona	36–15
2	September 10, 1983	Flagstaff, AZ	Northern Arizona	53–3
3	August 30, 1986	Flagstaff, AZ	Southern Utah	27–17
4	September 3, 1988	Flagstaff, AZ	Northern Arizona	55–13
5	September 5, 1992	Flagstaff, AZ	Southern Utah	20–17
6	September 4, 1993	Cedar City, UT	Northern Arizona	53–3
7	September 10, 1994	Flagstaff, AZ	Northern Arizona	59–21
8	September 14, 1996	Flagstaff, AZ	#16 Northern Arizona	43–13
9	November 18, 2000	Flagstaff, AZ	Southern Utah	27–23
10	September 22, 2001	Cedar City, UT	#25 Northern Arizona	41–12
11	September 17, 2005	Flagstaff, AZ	Northern Arizona	27–7
12	September 20, 2008	Cedar City, UT	Northern Arizona	19–14
13	September 19, 2009	Flagstaff, AZ	Northern Arizona	42–39
14	October 2, 2010	Cedar City, UT	Northern Arizona	26–23
15	November 19, 2011	Flagstaff, AZ	Southern Utah	27–24

No.	Date	Location	Winner	Score
16	November 10, 2012	Flagstaff, AZ	Southern Utah	35–29 ^{3OT}
17	November 23, 2013	Cedar City, UT	#10 Northern Arizona	20–10
18	November 22, 2014	Flagstaff, AZ	Southern Utah	22–14
19	November 21, 2015	Cedar City, UT	#20 Southern Utah	49–41
20	November 19, 2016	Flagstaff, AZ	Southern Utah	48–21
21	November 18, 2017	Cedar City, UT	#14 Southern Utah	48–20
22	September 22, 2018	Flagstaff, AZ	Northern Arizona	31–23
23	November 16, 2019	Cedar City, UT	Southern Utah	31–30
24	February 27, 2021	Flagstaff, AZ	Northern Arizona	34–33
25	April 10, 2021	Cedar City, UT	Northern Arizona	28–20
26	October 16, 2021	Flagstaff, AZ	Northern Arizona	59–35
27	September 13, 2025	Cedar City, UT	Northern Arizona	52–49
28	October 31, 2026	Cedar City, UT	Northern Arizona	34–27
Series: Northern Arizona leads 18–10

== See also ==
- List of NCAA college football rivalry games
