= 2020–21 NCAA Division I FCS football season =

American college football season

2020 NCAA Division I FCS season

Regular season
- Number of teams: 127 (101)
- Duration: Fall 2020 / Spring 2021
- Payton Award: Southeastern Louisiana quarterback Cole Kelley
- Buchanan Award: Southern defensive end Jordan Lewis

Playoff
- Duration: April 24, 2021 – May 8, 2021
- Championship date: May 16, 2021
- Championship site: Toyota Stadium, Frisco, Texas
- Champion: Sam Houston State

NCAA Division I FCS football seasons
- «2019 2021»

The 2020–21 NCAA Division I FCS football season, part of college football in the United States, was organized by the National Collegiate Athletic Association (NCAA) at the Division I Football Championship Subdivision (FCS) level.

The regular season and postseason were impacted by the COVID-19 pandemic in the United States. Several FCS conferences moved their scheduled games from the fall of 2020 to the spring of 2021, and in August 2020, the NCAA announced that the FCS postseason would also be delayed.

While the NCAA at one point announced a cancellation of the FCS playoff, in late September 2020 a revised playoff schedule was announced, with the FCS Championship Game played on May 16, 2021. Sam Houston State defeated South Dakota State for the title, 23–21.

Of the 127 programs in FCS for this season, 101 played at least one game in either the fall of 2020 or the spring of 2021. The remaining 26 schools opted not to participate. The Ivy League was the only FCS conference with no members competing in football in 2020–21.

== Conference changes and new programs ==
School	2019 conference	2020–21 conference
Dixie State	RMAC (D-II)	FCS Independent
North Dakota	FCS Independent	MVFC
Tarleton State	LSC (D-II)	FCS Independent
Presbyterian	Big South	FCS Independent
Jacksonville	Pioneer	Dropped program
Robert Morris	NEC	Big South

== Notable headlines ==
- May 19 – The NCAA declared four FCS football programs ineligible for postseason play in 2020 due to failure to meet the required Academic Progress Rate (APR) benchmarks: Howard, McNeese State, Prairie View A&M, and Stephen F. Austin.
- July 8 – The Ivy League announced that it would play no sports until January 1, 2021, at the earliest, because of the COVID-19 pandemic.
- July 13 – The Patriot League announced the cancellation of its fall sports season due to the COVID-19 pandemic.
- July 16 – The MEAC announced that it would not play sports in the fall.
- July 17 – The Colonial Athletic Association announced that it would not play fall sports, but that teams still wishing to play football could compete as independents for the 2020 season. Due to the cancellation of the MEAC season, ESPN Events announced that the MEAC/SWAC Challenge and Celebration Bowl had both been canceled.
- July 19 – The SWAC announced that it had canceled fall sports but became the first conference to commit to playing football in the spring, with the announcement of a seven-game conference schedule preceded by an eight-week training schedule to start in January 2021.
- July 27 – The Pioneer Football League announced that it would play a conference-only schedule in 2020.
- July 29 – The Northeast Conference announced the postponement of all fall sports.
- August 7 – The Pioneer Football League canceled its fall football season, with no announcement made with regard to playing in the spring. The Big Sky Conference became second FCS conference to commit to playing football in the spring of 2021.
- August 10 – The Missouri Valley Football Conference likewise announced that it would play its fall 2020 football season in spring of 2021.
- September 22 – After several more conferences decided to play at least a limited spring football schedule, the NCAA announced that the 2020 FCS playoffs would be held in the spring of 2021, with bracket reduced from 24 teams to 16, culminating in the FCS Championship Game to be played on May 16, 2021.

== FCS team wins over FBS teams ==
Italics denotes FBS teams.

Date	Visiting team	Home team	Site	Result	Attendance	Ref.
October 23	Jacksonville State	FIU	Riccardo Silva Stadium • Miami, Florida	19–10	1,041	
February 21, 2021	Tarleton State	New Mexico State	Sun Bowl • El Paso, Texas	43–17	0	
^{#}Rankings from AP Poll released prior to game.

== Conference standings ==
All teams played spring schedules, except where noted. The Ivy League did not play in either the fall or spring.

2020 Big Sky Conference football standings
	Conf.			Overall
Team	W		L	W		L
No. 9 Weber State $^	5	–	0	5	–	1
No. 10 Eastern Washington ^	5	–	1	5	–	2
No. 14 UC Davis	3	–	2	3	–	2
Northern Arizona	3	–	2	3	–	2
Idaho State	2	–	4	2	–	4
Idaho	2	–	4	2	–	4
Southern Utah	1	–	5	1	–	5
Cal Poly‡	0	–	3	0	–	3
Montana†		–		2	–	0
Portland State†		–		0	–	1
$ – Conference champion; ^ – FCS playoff participant; Notes: Due to COVID-19, the Big Sky suspended the fall 2020 football season. Montana State, Northern Colorado, and Sacramento State opted out of the spring season. † – Montana and Portland State opted out of the conference season, but scheduled non-conference games. ‡ – Cal Poly opted out of the remainder of the spring season on March 29, 2021.; Rankings from STATS Poll

2020 Big South Conference football standings
	Conf.			Overall
Team	W		L	W		L
No. 10 Monmouth $^	3	–	0	3	–	1
No. 17 Kennesaw State	2	–	1	4	–	1
Charleston Southern	2	–	2	2	–	2
Gardner–Webb	0	–	2	2	–	2
Robert Morris	0	–	2	0	–	3
$ – Conference champion; ^ – FCS playoff participant; Notes: Due to COVID-19, the Big South suspended the fall 2020 football season. Hampton opted out of the spring schedule. Campbell and North Alabama played only in the fall.; Rankings from STATS Poll

2020 Colonial Athletic Association football standings
	Conf.			Overall
Team	W		L	W		L
North Division
No. 4 Delaware x$^	4	–	0	7	–	1
No. 18 Rhode Island †	2	–	1	2	–	1
No. 16 Villanova	2	–	2	2	–	2
Maine	2	–	2	2	–	2
Stony Brook	1	–	3	1	–	3
Albany †	1	–	3	1	–	3
New Hampshire †	0	–	1	0	–	1
South Division
No. 3 James Madison x^	3	–	0	7	–	1
No. 15 Richmond	3	–	1	3	–	1
William & Mary	1	–	2	1	–	2
Elon	0	–	4	1	–	5
$ – Conference champion; x – Division champion/co-champions; ^ – FCS playoff participant; Notes: Due to COVID-19, the CAA suspended the fall 2020 football season. Towson opted out of the spring football season. † – Albany, New Hampshire, and Rhode Island opted out of the remainder of the spring season on March 31, April 6, and April 7 respectively.; Rankings from STATS Poll

2020 Mid-Eastern Athletic Conference football standings
	Conf.			Overall
Team	W		L	W		L
North Division
Delaware State	2	–	2	2	–	3
Howard*	0	–	2	0	–	2
South Division
South Carolina State	2	–	0	3	–	1
Notes: Due to COVID-19, the Mid-Eastern Athletic suspended the fall 2020 football season. Florida A&M, Bethune–Cookman, North Carolina Central, North Carolina A&T, Morgan State, and Norfolk State opted out of the spring season. The MEAC suspended the spring season on February 11, due to only having three schools playing in the spring. * – Ineligible for FCS postseason play due to NCAA sanctions; Rankings from STATS Poll

2020 Missouri Valley Football Conference standings
	Conf.			Overall
Team	W		L	W		L
No. 2 South Dakota State +^	5	–	1	8	–	2
No. 12 Missouri State +^	5	–	1	5	–	5
No. 7 North Dakota ^	4	–	1	5	–	2
No. 6 North Dakota State ^	5	–	2	7	–	3
No. 14 Southern Illinois ^	3	–	3	6	–	4
Northern Iowa	3	–	4	3	–	4
South Dakota	1	–	3	1	–	3
Illinois State†	1	–	3	1	–	3
Western Illinois†	1	–	5	1	–	5
Youngstown State	1	–	6	1	–	6
+ – Conference co-champions; ^ – FCS playoff participant; Note: Indiana State opted out of the spring season. † – Illinois State and Western Illinois opted out of the remainder of the spring season on March 21 and April 5, 2021, respectively.; Rankings from STATS Poll

2020 Northeast Conference football standings
	Conf.			Overall
Team	W		L	W		L
Duquesne y	4	–	0	4	–	1
Sacred Heart y$^	2	–	1	3	–	2
LIU	2	–	2	2	–	2
Bryant	2	–	2	2	–	2
Wagner	0	–	2	0	–	2
Merrimack*	0	–	3	0	–	3
Championship: Sacred Heart 34, Duquesne 27 (OT)
$ – Conference champion; y – Championship game participant; ^ – FCS playoff participant; Note: Due to COVID-19, the Northeast suspended the 2020 football season. * – Merrimack ineligible for NEC title and FCS postseason play due to transition to NCAA Division I Central Connecticut and Saint Francis (PA) opted out of the spring season.; Rankings from STATS Poll

2020 Ohio Valley Conference football standings
	Conf.			Overall
Team	W		L	W		L
No. 8 Jacksonville State $^	6	–	1	10	–	3
No. 19 Murray State	5	–	2	5	–	2
No. 21 Austin Peay	4	–	2	4	–	5
Southeast Missouri State	4	–	3	4	–	4
UT Martin	3	–	4	3	–	4
Tennessee Tech	2	–	5	2	–	5
Tennessee State	2	–	5	2	–	5
Eastern Illinois	1	–	5	1	–	5
$ – Conference champion; ^ – FCS playoff participant; Note: Eastern Kentucky played only in the fall and opted out of the spring season.; Rankings from STATS Poll

2020 Patriot League football standings
	Conf.			Overall
Team	W		L	W		L
North Division
Holy Cross $^	2	–	0	3	–	1
Fordham	2	–	1	2	–	1
Colgate	0	–	2	0	–	2
South Division
Bucknell	2	–	1	2	–	2
Lafayette	2	–	1	2	–	1
Lehigh	0	–	3	0	–	3
Championship: Holy Cross 33, Bucknell 10
$ – Conference champion; ^ – FCS playoff participant; Notes: Due to COVID-19, the Patriot League suspended the fall 2020 football season. Georgetown opted out of the spring football season.; Rankings from STATS Poll

2020 Pioneer Football League standings
	Conf.			Overall
Team	W		L	W		L
Davidson $^	4	–	1	4	–	3
Valparaiso	4	–	2	4	–	2
San Diego	4	–	2	4	–	2
Morehead State	4	–	2	4	–	3
Drake	2	–	3	2	–	3
Stetson	0	–	4	0	–	4
Butler	0	–	6	0	–	6
Presbyterian	0	–	0	4	–	3
$ – Conference champion; ^ – FCS playoff participant; Notes: Due to COVID-19, the Pioneer Football League suspended the fall 2020 football season. Dayton and Marist opted out of the spring season. Presbyterian played a full PFL schedule, but was ineligible for the conference title, and its games were not counted in PFL standings.; Rankings from STATS Poll

2020 Southern Conference football standings
	Conf.			Overall
Team	W		L	W		L
No. 11 VMI $^	6	–	1	6	–	2
No. 22 East Tennessee State	4	–	2	4	–	2
Chattanooga†	3	–	1	3	–	2
Mercer	5	–	3	5	–	6
Samford	4	–	3	4	–	3
Furman	3	–	4	3	–	4
Wofford†	1	–	4	1	–	4
The Citadel	2	–	6	2	–	10
Western Carolina	1	–	5	1	–	8
$ – Conference champion; ^ – FCS playoff participant; † – Chattanooga and Wofford opted out of the remainder of the spring season on March 29 and April 5, 2021, respectively.; Rankings from STATS Poll

2020 Southland Conference football standings
	Conf.			Overall
Team	W		L	W		L
No. 1 Sam Houston State $^	6	–	0	10	–	0
No. 20 Southeastern Louisiana	4	–	2	4	–	3
No. 23 Nicholls	3	–	3	4	–	3
Incarnate Word	3	–	3	3	–	3
Lamar	2	–	4	2	–	4
McNeese State*	2	–	4	3	–	4
Northwestern State	1	–	5	1	–	5
$ – Conference champion; ^ – FCS playoff participant; * – Ineligible for FCS postseason play due to NCAA sanctions Note: Abilene Christian, Central Arkansas, Houston Baptist, and Stephen F. Austin played only in the fall and opted out of the spring season.; Rankings from STATS Poll

2020 Southwestern Athletic Conference football standings
	Conf.			Overall
Team	W		L	W		L
East Division
No. 24 Alabama A&M x$	3	–	0	5	–	0
Alabama State	3	–	2	3	–	3
Jackson State	3	–	2	4	–	3
Mississippi Valley State	1	–	3	1	–	3
West Division
Arkansas–Pine Bluff x	4	–	0	4	–	1
Southern	4	–	1	5	–	1
Prairie View A&M*	2	–	1	2	–	1
Texas Southern	1	–	2	1	–	2
Grambling State	0	–	4	0	–	4
Championship: Alabama A&M 40, Arkansas–Pine Bluff 33
$ – Conference champion; x – Division champion/co-champions; Note: The SWAC played a spring conference-only schedule (February–May 2021) due to COVID-19 pandemic. Alcorn State opted out of the spring season; all of their scheduled games were counted as forfeit wins for their opponents. * – Ineligible for FCS postseason play due to NCAA sanctions.; Rankings from STATS Poll

2020 NCAA Division I FCS independents football standings
	Conf.			Overall
Team	W		L	W		L
Stephen F. Austin		–		6	–	4
Tarleton State†		–		5	–	3
Central Arkansas		–		5	–	4
Presbyterian†		–		4	–	3
Eastern Kentucky		–		3	–	6
Dixie State†		–		2	–	3
Houston Baptist		–		1	–	3
Abilene Christian		–		1	–	5
Campbell		–		0	–	4
North Alabama		–		0	–	4
Note: † – Dixie State, Presbyterian, and Tarleton State played only in the spring. All other teams listed played only in the fall. Presbyterian was in a scheduling agreement with the Pioneer Football League, which it fully joined in July 2021.

2020 Ivy League football standings
	Conf.			Overall
Team	W		L	W		L
Brown		–			–
Columbia		–			–
Cornell		–			–
Dartmouth		–			–
Harvard		–			–
Penn		–			–
Princeton		–			–
Yale		–			–
Note: Due to COVID-19, the Ivy League suspended the 2020 football season.; Rankings from STATS Poll

== Playoff qualifiers ==
=== Automatic berths for conference champions ===
Conference	Team	Appearance	Last bid	Result of last appearance
Big Sky Conference	Weber State	8th	2019	Semifinals (L – James Madison)
Big South Conference	Monmouth	3rd	2019	Second Round (L – James Madison)
Colonial Athletic Association	Delaware	17th	2018	First Round (L – James Madison)
Missouri Valley Football Conference	South Dakota State	10th	2019	Second Round (L – Northern Iowa)
Northeast Conference	Sacred Heart	3rd	2014	First Round (L – Fordham)
Ohio Valley Conference	Jacksonville State	10th	2018	Second Round (L – Maine)
Patriot League	Holy Cross	4th	2019	First Round (L – Monmouth)
Pioneer Football League	Davidson	1st	–	–
Southern Conference	VMI	1st	–	–
Southland Conference	Sam Houston State	12th	2017	Semifinals (L – North Dakota State)

=== At large qualifiers ===
Conference	Team	Appearance	Last bid	Result of last appearance
Big Sky Conference	Eastern Washington	14th	2018	First Round (L – North Dakota State)
Colonial Athletic Association	James Madison	17th	2019	Championship Game (L – North Dakota State)
Missouri Valley Football Conference	Missouri State	3rd	1990	First Round (L – Idaho)
Missouri Valley Football Conference	North Dakota	3rd	2019	First Round (L – Nicholls)
Missouri Valley Football Conference	North Dakota State	11th	2019	National champions (W – James Madison)
Missouri Valley Football Conference	Southern Illinois	9th	2009	Quarterfinals (L – William & Mary)

=== Abstentions ===
- Ivy League – None
- Mid-Eastern Athletic Conference – None
- Southwestern Athletic Conference – Alabama A&M

== Postseason ==
In late September 2020, the NCAA announced that the FCS postseason would take place in April and May 2021. Also announced was a reduction of participating teams from 24 to 16, with 10 automatic qualifiers. The first round of the playoffs was scheduled for April 24, with the Championship Game in mid-May, later set for May 16.

=== Bowl game ===
Due to the MEAC cancelling all fall sports for the 2020 season, the MEAC/SWAC Celebration Bowl (the one FCS bowl game) was canceled.

=== NCAA Division I playoff bracket ===
First Round; April 24; Campus sites
1	South Dakota State*	31
Holy Cross	3
Southern Illinois	34
Weber State*	31
Delaware*	19
Sacred Heart	10
Davidson	14
4	Jacksonville State*	49
3	James Madison*	31
VMI	24
Missouri State	10
North Dakota*	44
North Dakota State*	42
Eastern Washington	20
Monmouth	15
2	Sam Houston State*	21

Quarterfinals; May 2 Campus sites
1	South Dakota State*	31
Southern Illinois	26
Delaware	20
4	Jacksonville State*	14
3	James Madison	34
North Dakota	21
North Dakota State	20
2	Sam Houston State*	24

Semifinals; May 8 Campus sites
1	South Dakota State*	33
Delaware	3
3	James Madison	35
2	Sam Houston State*	38

National Championship Game; May 16; Toyota Stadium; Frisco, Texas
1	South Dakota State	21
2	Sam Houston State	23

* Host institution

== Kickoff game ==
Saturday, August 29 – FCS Kickoff (Cramton Bowl, Montgomery, Alabama): Central Arkansas 24, Austin Peay 17.

== Coaching changes ==
=== Preseason and in-season ===
Table only includes coaching changes that took place on or after May 1, 2020. For coaching changes that occurred earlier in 2020, see 2019 NCAA Division I FCS end-of-season coaching changes.

School	Outgoing coach	Date	Reason	Replacement	Previous position
Austin Peay	Mark Hudspeth	July 3	Resigned	Marquase Lovings (interim)	Austin Peay defensive line coach (2019)
Jackson State	John Hendrick	August 31	Fired	Deion Sanders	Trinity Christian (TX) offensive coordinator (2017–2019)
Austin Peay	Marquase Lovings (interim)	October 27	Permanent replacement	Scotty Walden	Southern Miss interim head coach (2020)
Montana State	Jeff Choate	January 22	Hired as Texas defensive coordinator	Brent Vigen	Wyoming offensive coordinator, associate head coach & quarterbacks coach (2017–2020)

=== End of season ===
School	Outgoing coach	Date	Reason	Replacement	Previous position
Norfolk State	Latrell Scott	March 3	Hired as East Carolina tight ends coach	Dawson Odums	Southern head coach (2013–2020)
Western Carolina	Mark Speir	April 9	Fired	Kerwin Bell	South Florida offensive coordinator (2019)
Tennessee State	Rod Reed	April 11	Retired	Eddie George	N/A
Southern	Dawson Odums	April 20	Hired by Norfolk State	Jason Rollins (interim)	Southern special teams coordinator and safeties coach (2020)
Presbyterian	Tommy Spangler	April 21	Fired	Kevin Kelley	Pulaski Academy (AR) head coach (2003–2020)

== See also ==
- 2020 NCAA Division I FCS football rankings
- 2020 NCAA Division I FBS football season
- 2020–21 NCAA Division III football season
- 2020 NAIA football season
