= Beehive Bowl =

American college football rivalry

- Southern Utah Thunderbirds Weber State Wildcats
- Sport: Football
- First meeting: October 20, 1984; Weber State, 29–10
- Latest meeting: September 5, 2026; Southern Utah, 47–42
- Next meeting: November 13, 2027

Statistics
- Total meetings: 30
- All-time series: Weber State leads, 21–9
- Largest victory: Weber State, 62–0 (2021)
- Longest win streak: Weber State, 11 (1984–1997)
- Current win streak: Southern Utah, 1 (2026–present)

Locations of Southern Utah and Weber State

The Southern Utah–Weber State football rivalry, known as the Beehive Bowl, is the annual football game between Southern Utah University and Weber State University. Between 1984 and 2006, the schools met 17 times. In 2011, Southern Utah joined the Big Sky Conference, making it a yearly rivalry. On January 14, 2021, the Western Athletic Conference announced that they are reinstating football, with Southern Utah among the teams moving to the WAC. On June 16, 2022, the two schools announced a six-game, home-and-home football series beginning in 2026. On June 25, 2025, the Big Sky Conference announced Southern Utah will rejoin the conference in 2026, making the game a yearly rivalry once again.

== Game results ==
Southern Utah victories	Weber State victories

No.	Date	Location	Winner	Score
1	October 20, 1984	Ogden, UT	Weber State	29–10
2	September 7, 1985	Ogden, UT	Weber State	62–20
3	September 19, 1987	Ogden, UT	Weber State	36–26
4	September 24, 1988	Ogden, UT	Weber State	49–30
5	October 14, 1989	Ogden, UT	Weber State	42–7
6	September 1, 1990	Cedar City, UT	Weber State	37–21
7	September 7, 1991	Ogden, UT	Weber State	33–14
8	September 12, 1992	Ogden, UT	Weber State	35–24
9	October 30, 1993	Ogden, UT	Weber State	43–39
10	October 15, 1994	Cedar City, UT	Weber State	20–14
11	September 13, 1997	Ogden, UT	Weber State	33–32
12	October 16, 1999	Ogden, UT	Southern Utah	39–7
13	September 1, 2001	Cedar City, UT	Southern Utah	28–21
14	September 6, 2003	Ogden, UT	Weber State	13–3
15	September 4, 2004	Ogden, UT	Southern Utah	34–31
16	November 19, 2005	Cedar City, UT	Weber State	27–10

No.	Date	Location	Winner	Score
17	September 16, 2006	Ogden, UT	Weber State	24–13
18	October 22, 2011	Ogden, UT	Southern Utah	35–28
19	October 20, 2012	Cedar City, UT	Weber State	24–22
20	November 9, 2013	Ogden, UT	Southern Utah	27–21
21	September 27, 2014	Cedar City, UT	Southern Utah	31–28
22	October 2, 2015	Ogden, UT	Southern Utah	44–0
23	October 22, 2016	Cedar City, UT	Weber State	37–36
24	October 14, 2017	Ogden, UT	Southern Utah	32–16
25	December 2, 2017^{A}	Cedar City, UT	#11 Weber State	30–13
26	November 10, 2018	Cedar City, UT	#3 Weber State	31–18
27	October 12, 2019	Ogden, UT	#4 Weber State	29–14
28	April 3, 2021	Cedar City, UT	#3 Weber State	19–16
29	November 13, 2021	Cedar City, UT	Weber State	62–0
30	September 5, 2026	Cedar City, UT	Southern Utah	47–42
Series: Weber State leads 21–9

^{A} FCS playoff game

== See also ==
- List of NCAA college football rivalry games
