= 2023 FCS All-America college football team =

College football honors

The 2023 FCS College Football All-America Team includes those players of American college football who have been honored by various selector organizations as the best players at their respective positions, in the Football Championship Subdivision (FCS). The selector organizations award the "All-America" honor annually following the conclusion of the fall college football season.

The 2023 FCS College Football All-America Team is composed of the following College Football All-American first teams chosen by the following selector organizations: Associated Press (AP), American Football Coaches Association (AFCA), Walter Camp Foundation (WCFF), Stats Perform (STATS), Phil Steele, Sports Illustrated (SI) and Pro Football Focus (PFF).

Currently, the NCAA does not recognizes any organization as an official selector for the FCS College Football All-America Team, so no player can be selected as a consensus selection, let alone a unanimous All-American.

== Offense ==
=== Quarterback ===
- Mark Gronowski, South Dakota State (AP, WCFF, STATS, Phil Steele, SI)
- Max Brosmer, New Hampshire (AFCA, STATS)
- Matthew Sluka, Holy Cross (SI)
- Cam Miller, North Dakota State (PFF)

=== Running back ===
- Jaden Shirden, Monmouth (AP, AFCA, WCFF, STATS, Phil Steele, SI)
- Isaiah Davis, South Dakota State (AP, AFCA, STATS, Phil Steele, SI, PFF)
- Lan Larison, UC Davis (WCFF, SI)

=== Fullback ===
- Derryk Snell, Montana State (Phil Steele)

=== Wide receiver ===
- Dymere Miller, Monmouth (AP, AFCA, WCFF, STATS, Phil Steele, SI, PFF) (Note: Recognized by the seven selectors)
- Ty James, Mercer (AP, AFCA, STATS, Phil Steele, SI, PFF)
- Jalen Coker, Holy Cross (AP, STATS, Phil Steele, SI, PFF)
- Hayden Hatten, Idaho (WCFF, SI)

=== Tight end ===
- Cam Grandy, Illinois State (AP, AFCA, WCFF, STATS, Phil Steele, SI, PFF)
- Zach Heins, South Dakota State (WCFF)

=== Offensive linemen ===
- Garret Greenfield, South Dakota State (AP, AFCA, WCFF, STATS, Phil Steele)
- Marcus Wehr, Montana State (AP, AFCA, STATS, SI, PFF)
- Mason McCormick, South Dakota State (AP, WCFF, STATS, Phil Steele, SI)
- Jacob Johanning, Furman (AP, AFCA, STATS, Phil Steele)
- Noah Atagi, Weber State (AP, WCFF, STATS)
- Omar Aigbedion, Montana State (WCFF, SI, PFF)
- Gus Miller, South Dakota State (SI, PFF)
- Luke Newman, Holy Cross (SI, PFF)
- Charles Grant, William & Mary (AFCA)
- Jalen Sundell, North Dakota State (AFCA)
- Al Forbes, Montana (WCFF)
- Jake Kubas, North Dakota State (STATS)
- Kiran Amegadjie, Yale (Phil Steele)
- C. J. Hanson, Holy Cross (Phil Steele)
- Pearson Toomey, Furman (SI)
- Donny Ventrelli, North Dakota (PFF)

== Defense ==
=== Defensive linemen ===
- Terrell Allen, Tennessee State (AP, AFCA, WCFF, STATS, Phil Steele, SI)
- Anton Juncaj, Albany (AP, AFCA, WCFF, STATS, SI, PFF)
- Jay Person, Chattanooga (AP, AFCA, STATS)
- Alex Gubner, Montana (AP, AFCA, SI)
- Ty French, Gardner–Webb (STATS, Phil Steele, SI)
- Finn Claypool, Drake (WCFF)
- Elijah Ponder, Cal Poly (WCFF)
- David Walker, Central Arkansas (STATS)
- Syrus Webster, Utah Tech (Phil Steele) (STATS)
- Daylan Dotson, UT Martin (Phil Steele)
- Nate Lynn, William & Mary (Phil Steele)
- A. J. Simon, Albany (SI)
- Thor Griffith, Harvard (PFF)
- Steven Parker, Incarnate Word (PFF)
- Levi Drake Rodriguez, Texas A&M–Commerce (PFF)

=== Linebacker ===
- Jacob Dobbs, Holy Cross (AP, WCFF, STATS, SI, PFF)
- Brock Mogensen, South Dakota (AP, AFCA, STATS, Phil Steele)
- Dylan Kelly, Albany (AP, STATS, Phil Steele, SI)
- Winston Reid, Weber State (WCFF, STATS, Phil Steele, SI)
- Micah Davey, McNeese (AFCA, WCFF)
- Billy Shaeffer, Lafayette (STATS, SI)
- John Pius, William & Mary (Phil Steele, SI)
- Tristan Wheeler, Richmond (AFCA)
- Ozzie Nicholas, Princeton (PFF)

=== Defensive back ===
- Cole Wisniewski, North Dakota State (AP, AFCA, WCFF, STATS, Phil Steele, SI, PFF)
- P. J. Jules, Southern Illinois (AP, AFCA, STATS, Phil Steele, SI, PFF)
- Marcus Harris, Idaho (AP, STATS, Phil Steele)
- Myles Harden, South Dakota (AFCA, STATS, Phil Steele)
- Lance Wise Jr., Mercer (AP, STATS, SI)
- Sheldon Arnold II, East Tennessee State (AP, AFCA)
- Cally Chizik, Furman (WCFF)
- Russell Dandy, Eastern Illinois (WCFF)
- Trevin Gradney, Montana (WCFF)
- Kam Brown, Chattanooga (SI)
- Aamir Hall, Albany (SI)
- Jaidyn Denis, Elon (PFF)
- Cedarius Doss, Austin Peay (PFF)

== Special teams ==
=== Kicker ===
- Kyle Ramsey, Abilene Christian (AFCA, STATS, Phil Steele)
- Matthew Cook, Northern Iowa (AP, WCFF)
- Richard McCollum, Western Carolina (SI)
- Cade Bonoffski, William & Mary (PFF)

=== Punter ===
- Aidan Laros, UT Martin (AP, AFCA, WCFF, STATS, Phil Steele, SI)
- Brendan Hall, Montana State (PFF)

=== Long snapper ===
- Hunter Brozio, North Dakota State (AFCA)
- A. J. Covan, Gardner–Webb (STATS)
- Julian Ashby, Furman (Phil Steele)

=== Return specialist / All-purpose ===
- Dylan Laube, New Hampshire (AP, AFCA, STATS, Phil Steele, SI)
- Donovan Wadley, Merrimack (WCFF, STATS, SI, PFF)
- Devron Harper, Mercer (WCFF, SI)
- Kam Thomas, Austin Peay (STATS, SI)
- Taymon Cooke, North Carolina A&T (Phil Steele)

== Sources ==
- Associated Press (AP):
- American Football Coaches Association (AFCA):
- Walter Camp Foundation (WCFF):
- Stats Perform (STATS):
- Phil Steele:
- Sports Illustrated (SI):
- Pro Football Focus (PFF):

== See also ==
- 2023 College Football All-America Team
- 2023 NCAA Division I FCS football season
