= Aamir Hall =

American football player (born 2001)

No. 16, 1, 12
- Position: Cornerback

Personal information
- Born: October 26, 2001 (age 25); Baltimore, Maryland, U.S.
- Listed height: 6 ft 1 in (1.85 m)
- Listed weight: 205 lb (93 kg)

Career information
- High school: Mount Saint Joseph (Baltimore, Maryland)
- College: Richmond (2021–2022); Albany (2023); Michigan (2024)

Awards and highlights
- First-team FCS All-American (2023)
- Stats at ESPN

Aamir Hall (born October 26, 2001) is an American football cornerback. He played college football for the Richmond Spiders, Albany Great Danes and the Michigan Wolverines. Hall was an FCS All-American with Albany in 2023.

== Early life ==
Hall was born on October 26, 2001, the son of James and Tonya Hall. He attended Mount Saint Joseph High School in Baltimore, Maryland where he ran track and played football. During his sophomore year, he played both as a defensive back and wide receiver. Defensively he had 30 tackles and two interceptions, while offensively he had 25 receptions for 400 yards and five touchdowns. During his junior year, he recorded 65 tackles, five tackles for loss, four interceptions, ten pass breakups, two fumble recoveries and a forced fumble. During his senior year, he recorded 85 tackles, 10 tackles for loss, four interceptions, seven pass breakups, two forced fumbles and one fumble recovery, and helped lead his team to the MIAA Championship. Following the season he was named a first team All-MIAA honoree.

== College career ==
=== Richmond ===
On February 5, 2020, Hall signed to play college football for the University of Richmond Spiders. Due to the COVID-19 pandemic, the 2020 season was moved to the spring of 2021. As a freshman, he played in all four spring games, with three starts. He ranked fourth on the team with 18 tackles, including 10 solo tackles. He made his collegiate debut on March 6, 2021, in a game against William & Mary. As a redshirt-freshman in the fall of 2021, he started all 11 games and finished with 60 tackles, including 3.5 tackles for a loss. He ranked fourth in the CAA in pass breakups with 12, and led all redshirt freshmen or true freshmen in passes defended. He recorded his first career interception on September 18, 2021, in a game against Villanova. Following the season he was named to the third-team Freshman All-America by Phil Steele. As a redshirt-sophomore in 2022, he played in nine games and finished with 28 tackles, including 1.5 tackles for a loss, three pass breakups and an interception.

=== Albany ===
Hall transferred to play for the University of Albany Great Danes in 2023. As a junior, he played in all 15 games and finished with 63 tackles, five interceptions one forced fumble, and 15 pass breakups. His 15 pass breakups ranked third in the NCAA Division I Football Championship Subdivision (FCS). He helped lead Albany to the FCS semifinals, where they defeated his former team, Richmond, in the second round, before losing to eventual FCS champion South Dakota State in the semifinals. Following the season he was named first-team All-CAA defense honoree and a first-team FCS All-American by Phil Steele. On March 8, 2024, Hall entered the NCAA transfer portal.

=== Michigan ===
On May 16, 2024, Hall transferred to play for the University of Michigan Wolverines. As a senior in 2024, he had 38 tackles, 2.5 tackles for a loss, four pass breakups, two interceptions and one forced fumble. In a game against Michigan State, he had a then season-high eight tackles. In the final regular season game against Ohio State, Hall intercepted a pass in the second quarter and returned it 11-yards to Ohio State's two-yard line, setting up Michigan for their only touchdown of the game. Following his performance, he was the highest graded Big Ten Conference cornerback from week 14, with an overall grade of 82.7 from Pro Football Focus (PFF). In the 2024 ReliaQuest Bowl against Alabama, he led the team in tackles with a season-high nine, and also posted one tackle for a loss, one sack, one forced fumble and one pass breakup.

== Professional career ==
Pre-draft measurables
Height	Weight	Arm length	Hand span	40-yard dash	10-yard split	20-yard split	20-yard shuttle	Three-cone drill	Vertical jump	Broad jump
6 ft 0 5/8 in (1.84 m)	205 lb (93 kg)	31 1/4 in (0.79 m)	8 7/8 in (0.23 m)	4.72 s	1.71 s	2.72 s	4.63 s	7.25 s	35.0 in (0.89 m)	9 ft 11 in (3.02 m)
All values from Pro Day

After not being selected in the 2025 NFL draft, Hall was invited to tryout for the Detroit Lions in May 2025.
