= Sheldon Arnold =

American football player (born 2002)

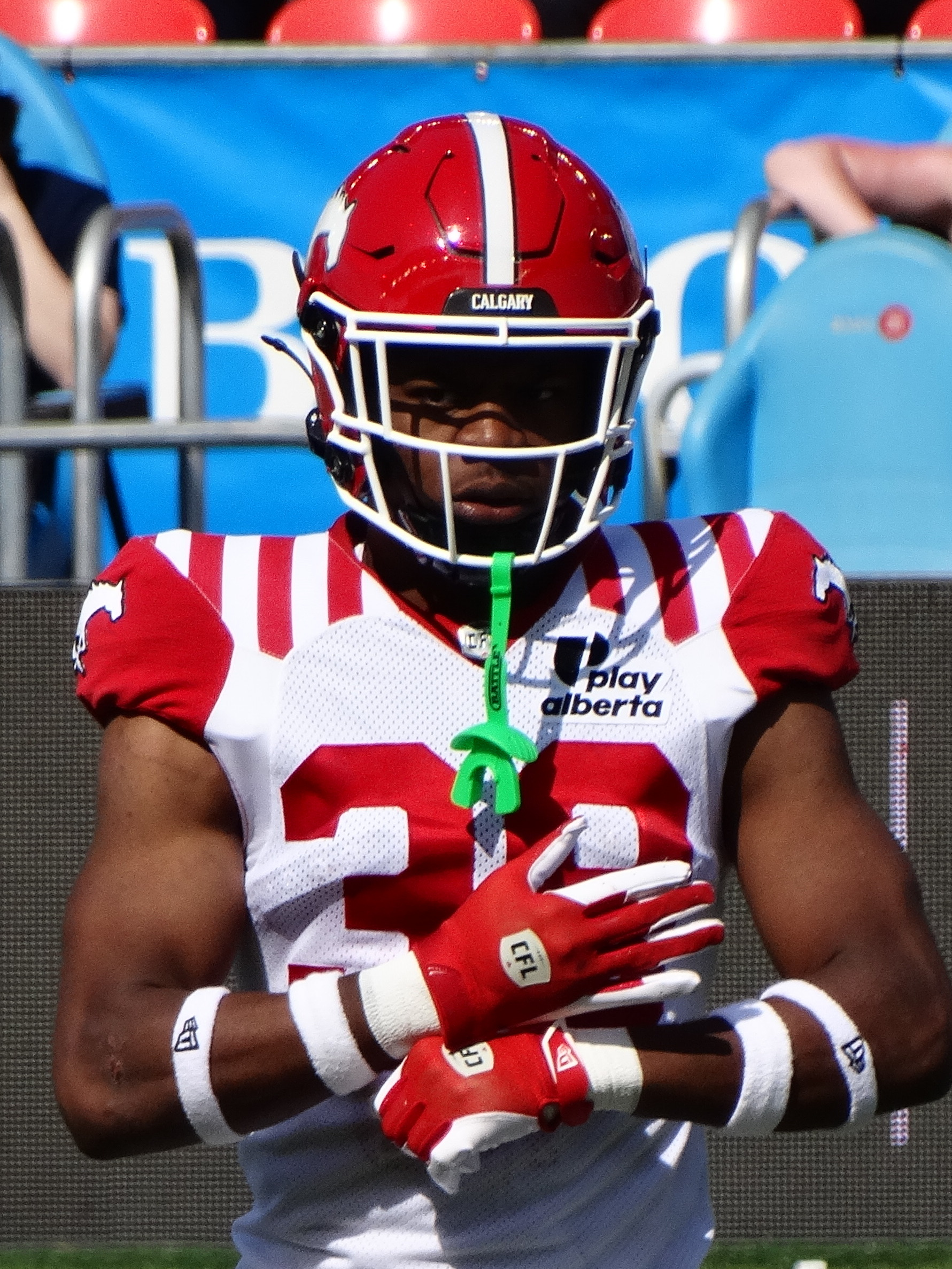
- Arnold with the Calgary Stampeders in 2025

No. 38 – Calgary Stampeders
- Position: Defensive back
- Roster status: Active
- CFL status: American

Personal information
- Born: May 13, 2002 (age 24); Loganville, Georgia, U.S.
- Listed height: 6 ft 1 in (1.85 m)
- Listed weight: 189 lb (86 kg)

Career information
- High school: Loganville
- College: East Tennessee (2020–2023); UCF (2024)

Career history
- 2025–present: Calgary Stampeders

Awards and highlights
- First-team FCS All-American (2023); First-team All-SoCon (2023)
- Stats at CFL.ca

Sheldon Arnold II (born May 13, 2002) is an American professional football defensive back for the Calgary Stampeders of the Canadian Football League (CFL). Arnold previously played college football for the East Tennessee State Buccaneers and the UCF Knights.

== College career ==
Arnold played college football for the East Tennessee State Buccaneers from 2020 to 2023 and the UCF Knights in 2024. He played in 41 games at East Tennessee, recording 145 tackles, seven interceptions, eight pass break ups, one sack, three forced fumbles and three fumble recoveries. In 2023, Arnold earned First-team All-SoCon honors and was a member of the First-team FCS All-American team.

In 2024, Arnold transferred to UCF, playing in all 12 games. He made 53 tackles, including two tackles for loss and one interception in his lone season as a Knight.

== Professional career ==
Pre-draft measurables
Height	Weight	Arm length	Hand span	Wingspan	40-yard dash	10-yard split	20-yard split	20-yard shuttle	Three-cone drill	Vertical jump	Broad jump	Bench press
5 ft 11 7/8 in (1.83 m)	193 lb (88 kg)	31 1/2 in (0.80 m)	8 3/4 in (0.22 m)	6 ft 2 1/2 in (1.89 m)	4.53 s	1.53 s	2.59 s	4.30 s	7.22 s	32.0 in (0.81 m)	9 ft 7 in (2.92 m)	14 reps
All values from Pro Day

On May 17, 2025, Arnold signed with the Calgary Stampeders of the CFL. He started in the season opener against the Hamilton Tiger-Cats and made three tackles.
