= 2023 Albany Great Danes football team =

American college football season

2023 Albany Great Danes football

CAA co-champion Lambert Cup winner

NCAA Division I Semifinal, L 0–59 at South Dakota State
- Conference: CAA Football Conference

Ranking
- STATS: No. 5
- FCS Coaches: No. 7
- Record: 11–4 (7–1 CAA)
- Head coach: Greg Gattuso (10th season)
- Offensive coordinator: Jared Ambrose (2nd season)
- Defensive coordinator: Bill Nesselt (1st season)
- Co-defensive coordinator: Darrin Walls (1st season)
- Home stadium: Bob Ford Field at Tom & Mary Casey Stadium

2023 Coastal Athletic Association Football Conference standings
	Conf.			Overall
Team	W		L	W		L
No. 5 Albany +^	7	–	1	11	–	4
No. 6 Villanova +^	7	–	1	10	–	3
No. 15 Richmond +^	7	–	1	9	–	4
No. 10 Delaware ^	6	–	2	9	–	4
Elon	6	–	2	6	–	5
New Hampshire	4	–	4	6	–	5
Rhode Island	4	–	4	6	–	5
William & Mary	4	–	4	6	–	5
Campbell	4	–	4	5	–	6
Towson	4	–	4	5	–	6
Hampton	3	–	5	5	–	6
Monmouth	3	–	5	4	–	7
Maine	1	–	7	2	–	9
North Carolina A&T	0	–	8	1	–	10
Stony Brook	0	–	8	0	–	10
+ – Conference co-champions; ^ – FCS playoff participant; Rankings from STATS Poll

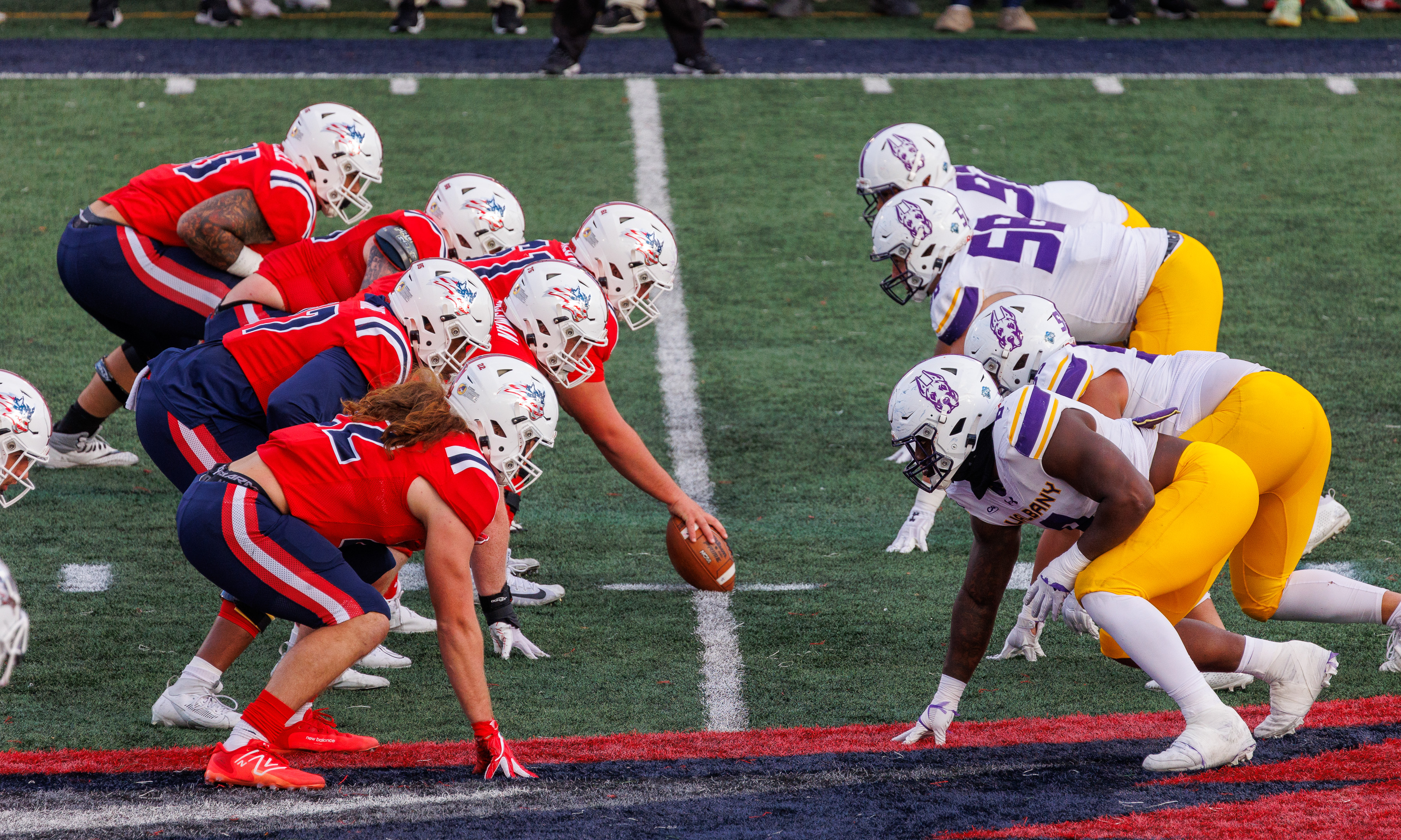
The Great Danes beat Stony Brook, 38-20

The 2023 Albany Great Danes football team represented University at Albany, SUNY as a member of Coastal Athletic Association Football Conference (CAA), during the 2023 NCAA Division I FCS football season. Led by tenth-year head coach Greg Gattuso, the Great Danes played home games at Bob Ford Field at Tom & Mary Casey Stadium in Albany, New York.

The CAA, formerly known as the Colonial Athletic Association from 2007 through 2022, changed its name in July 2023 to accommodate future membership expansion outside of states that were among the Thirteen Colonies.

== Schedule ==
Date	Time	Opponent	Rank	Site	TV	Result	Attendance
August 26	7:00 p.m.	Fordham*		Bob Ford Field at Tom & Mary Casey Stadium; Albany, NY	FloSports	W 34–13	8,500
September 2	6:00 p.m.	at Marshall*		Joan C. Edwards Stadium; Huntington, WV	ESPN+	L 17–21	25,101
September 9	12:00 a.m.	at Hawaii*		Clarence T. C. Ching Athletics Complex; Manoa, HI	SPEC PPV	L 20–31	9,485
September 23	6:00 p.m.	at Morgan State*		Hughes Stadium; Baltimore, MD	ESPN+	W 23–17 ^{OT}	1,175
September 30	3:30 p.m.	No. 16 Villanova		Bob Ford Field at Tom & Mary Casey Stadium; Albany, NY	FloSports	W 31–10	7,071
October 7	4:00 p.m.	at Towson		Johnny Unitas Stadium; Towson, MD	FloSports	W 24–17	4,789
October 14	1:00 p.m.	at New Hampshire	No. 24	Wildcat Stadium; Durham, NH	FloSports	L 31–38	8,346
October 21	3:30 p.m.	Rhode Island^{†}		Bob Ford Field at Tom & Mary Casey Stadium; Albany, NY	FloSports	W 35–10	5,196
October 28	1:00 p.m.	at Maine		Alfond Stadium, Orono, ME	FloSports	W 37–21	3,932
November 4	1:00 p.m.	No. 24 William & Mary	No. 23	Bob Ford Field at Tom & Mary Casey Stadium; Albany, NY	FloSports	W 24–8	3,518
November 11	1:00 p.m.	at Stony Brook	No. 18	Kenneth P. LaValle Stadium; Stony Brook, NY (rivalry)	FloSports	W 38–20	5,671
November 18	1:00 p.m.	Monmouth	No. 12	Bob Ford Field at Tom & Mary Casey Stadium; Albany, NY	FloSports	W 41–0	3,505
December 2	12:00 p.m.	No. 22 Richmond*	No. 9	Bob Ford Field at Tom & Mary Casey Stadium; Albany, NY (FCS Second Round)	ESPN+	W 41–13	2,652
December 9	10:00 p.m.	at No. 4 Idaho*	No. 9	Kibbie Dome; Moscow, ID (FCS Quarterfinal)	ESPN+	W 30–22	9,372
December 15	7:00 p.m.	at No. 1 South Dakota State*	No. 9	Dana J. Dykhouse Stadium; Brookings, SD (FCS Semifinal)	ESPN2	L 0–59	12,265
*Non-conference game; ^{†}Homecoming; Rankings from STATS Poll released prior to the game; All times are in Eastern time

== Game summaries ==
=== Fordham ===
Game One – Albany Great Danes (0–0) vs Fordham Rams (0–0)

Quarter	1	2	3	4	Total
Fordham	3	3	7	0	13
Albany	7	14	3	10	34

at Bob Ford Field at Tom & Mary Casey Stadium • Albany, New York

- Date: Saturday, August 26, 2023
- Game time: 7:00 p.m. EDT
- TV announcers (FloFootball): Michael Johnson, Jr.

Game information

First quarter
Second quarter
Third quarter
Fourth quarter

Statistics	FOR	ALB
First downs		
Plays–yards		
Rushes–yards		
Passing yards		
Passing: comp–att–int		
Time of possession		

Team	Category	Player	Statistics
Fordham	Passing		
Fordham	Rushing		
Fordham	Receiving		
Albany	Passing		
Albany	Rushing		
Albany	Receiving		

=== At Marshall ===
Game Two – Albany Great Danes (1–0) vs (FBS) Marshall Thundering Herd (0–0)

Quarter	1	2	3	4	Total
Albany	0	3	14	0	17
(FBS) Marshall	0	0	14	7	21

at Joan C. Edwards Stadium • Huntington, West Virginia

- Date: Saturday, September 2, 2023
- Game time: 6:00 p.m. EDT
- Game weather: Sunny • Temperature: 91 °F (33 °C)
- Game attendance: 25,101
- Referee: Javarro Edwards
- TV announcers (ESPN+): Mark Martin (play-by-play), Carl Lee (analyst)

Game information

First quarter

- No scoring plays

Second quarter

- (0:06) ALB – John Opalko 46 yard field goal (Drive: 6 plays, 20 yards, 1:03; Albany 3–0)

Third quarter

- (9:35) ALB – Jackson Parker 19 yard pass from Reese Poffenbarger (Drive: 11 plays, 75 yards, 5:25; Albany 10–0)
- (6:50) MRSH – Chuck Montgomery 19 yard pass from Cam Fancher (Drive: 8 plays, 65 yards, 2:38; Albany 10–7)
- (3:31) ALB – Reese Poffenbarger 54 yard run (Drive: 6 plays, 75 yards, 3:19; Albany 17–7)
- (2:22) MRSH – Rasheen Ali 13 yard run (Drive: 3 plays, 65 yards, 1:09; Albany 17–14)

Fourth quarter

- (12:53) MRSH – Rasheen Ali 30 yard run (Drive: 6 plays, 54 yards, 2:30; Marshall 21–17)

Statistics	ALB	MRSH
First downs	19	21
Plays–yards	74–300	61–413
Rushes–yards	36–106	26–145
Passing yards	194	268
Passing: comp–att–int	22–38–0	28–35–1
Time of possession	35:09	24:51

Team	Category	Player	Statistics
Albany	Passing	Reese Poffenbarger	22/38, 194 yards, 1 TD
Albany	Rushing	Nate Larkins	13 carries, 39 yards
Albany	Receiving	Jackson Parker	5 receptions, 51 yards, 1 TD
Marshall	Passing	Cam Fancher	28/35, 268 yards, 1 TD, 1 INT
Marshall	Rushing	Rasheen Ali	18 carries, 137 yards, 2 TD
Marshall	Receiving	Chuck Montgomery	6 receptions, 81 yards, 1 TD

=== At Hawaii ===
Game Three – Albany Great Danes (1–1) vs (FBS) Hawaii Rainbow Warriors (0–2)

Quarter	1	2	3	4	Total
Albany	7	10	3	0	20
(FBS) Hawaii	10	7	7	7	31

at Clarence T. C. Ching Athletics Complex • Manoa, Hawaii

- Date: Saturday, September 9, 2023
- Game time: 12:00 a.m. EST
- Game attendance: 9,485
- TV announcers (SPEC PPV): Kanoa Leahey, Rich Miano

Game information

First quarter
Second quarter
Third quarter
Fourth quarter

Statistics	ALB	HAW
First downs		
Plays–yards		
Rushes–yards		
Passing yards		
Passing: comp–att–int		
Time of possession		

Team	Category	Player	Statistics
Albany	Passing		
Albany	Rushing		
Albany	Receiving		
Hawaii	Passing		
Hawaii	Rushing		
Hawaii	Receiving		

=== At Morgan State ===
Game Four – Albany Great Danes (0–0) vs Morgan State Bears (0–0)

Quarter	1	2	Total
Albany			0
Morgan State			0

at Hughes Stadium • Baltimore, Maryland

- Date: Saturday, September 23, 2023
- Game time: 6:00 p.m. EST
- TV announcers (ESPN+): Phil Schoener, Emory Hunt

Game information

First quarter
Second quarter
Third quarter
Fourth quarter

Statistics	ALB	MGST
First downs		
Plays–yards		
Rushes–yards		
Passing yards		
Passing: comp–att–int		
Time of possession		

Team	Category	Player	Statistics
Albany	Passing		
Albany	Rushing		
Albany	Receiving		
Morgan State	Passing		
Morgan State	Rushing		
Morgan State	Receiving		

=== No. 16 Villanova ===
Game Five – Albany Great Danes (0–0) vs No. 16 Villanova Wildcats (0–0)

Quarter	1	2	Total
No. 16 Villanova			0
Albany			0

at Bob Ford Field at Tom & Mary Casey Stadium • Albany, New York

- Date: Saturday, September 30, 2023
- Game time: 3:30 p.m. EST
- TV announcers (FloFootball): Michael Johnson, Jr.

Game information

First quarter
Second quarter
Third quarter
Fourth quarter

Statistics	VIL	ALB
First downs		
Plays–yards		
Rushes–yards		
Passing yards		
Passing: comp–att–int		
Time of possession		

Team	Category	Player	Statistics
Villanova	Passing		
Villanova	Rushing		
Villanova	Receiving		
Albany	Passing		
Albany	Rushing		
Albany	Receiving		

=== At Towson ===
Game Six – Albany Great Danes (0–0) vs Towson Tigers (0–0)

Quarter	1	2	Total
Albany			0
Towson			0

at Johnny Unitas Stadium • Towson, Maryland

- Date: Saturday, October 7, 2023
- Game time: 4:00 p.m. EST
- TV announcers (FloFootball): Spiro Morekas, Gordy Combs

Game information

First quarter
Second quarter
Third quarter
Fourth quarter

Statistics	ALB	TOW
First downs		
Plays–yards		
Rushes–yards		
Passing yards		
Passing: comp–att–int		
Time of possession		

Team	Category	Player	Statistics
Albany	Passing		
Albany	Rushing		
Albany	Receiving		
Towson	Passing		
Towson	Rushing		
Towson	Receiving		

=== At New Hampshire ===
Game Seven – Albany Great Danes (0–0) vs New Hampshire Wildcats (0–0)

Quarter	1	2	Total
Albany			0
New Hampshire			0

at Wildcat Stadium • Durham, New Hampshire

- Date: Saturday, October 14, 2023
- Game time: 1:00 p.m. EST
- TV announcers (FloFootball): Justin McIsaac, Brian Espanet, Evan Gray

Game information

First quarter
Second quarter
Third quarter
Fourth quarter

Statistics	ALB	UNH
First downs		
Plays–yards		
Rushes–yards		
Passing yards		
Passing: comp–att–int		
Time of possession		

Team	Category	Player	Statistics
Albany	Passing		
Albany	Rushing		
Albany	Receiving		
New Hampshire	Passing		
New Hampshire	Rushing		
New Hampshire	Receiving		

=== Rhode Island ===
Game Eight – Albany Great Danes (0–0) vs Rhode Island Rams (0–0)

Quarter	1	2	Total
Rhode Island			0
Albany			0

at Bob Ford Field at Tom & Mary Casey Stadium • Albany, New York

- Date: Saturday, October 21, 2023
- Game time: 3:30 p.m. EST
- Game attendance: 5,196
- TV announcers (FloSports): Michael Johnson, Jr.

Game information

First quarter
Second quarter
Third quarter
Fourth quarter

Statistics	URI	ALB
First downs		
Plays–yards		
Rushes–yards		
Passing yards		
Passing: comp–att–int		
Time of possession		

Team	Category	Player	Statistics
Rhode Island	Passing		
Rhode Island	Rushing		
Rhode Island	Receiving		
Albany	Passing		
Albany	Rushing		
Albany	Receiving		

=== At Maine ===
Game Nine – Albany Great Danes (5–3) vs Maine Black Bears (2–6)

Quarter	1	2	3	4	Total
Albany	10	14	13	0	37
Maine	7	7	0	7	21

at Alfond Stadium • Orono, Maine

- Date: Saturday, October 28, 2023
- Game time: 1:00 p.m. EST
- Game weather: Sunny • Temperature: 73 °F (23 °C) • Wind: NE 10mph
- Game attendance: 3,932
- Referee: Anthony Florio
- TV announcers (FloFootball): Jim Churchill, Bryan Stackpole

Game information

First quarter
Second quarter
Third quarter
Fourth quarter

Statistics	ALB	ME
First downs	21	21
Plays–yards	62–473	67–312
Rushes–yards	32–149	24–92
Passing yards	324	220
Passing: comp–att–int	18–30–0	29–43–2
Time of possession	29:07	30:53

Team	Category	Player	Statistics
Albany	Passing	Reese Poffenbarger	18/30, 324 yards, 2 TD
Albany	Rushing	Faysal Aden	22 rushes, 142 yards, 2 TD
Albany	Receiving	MarQeese Dietz	7 receptions, 150 yards
Maine	Passing	Derek Robertson	29/43, 220 yards, 3 TD, 2 INT
Maine	Rushing	Brian Santana-Fis	3 rushes, 35 yards
Maine	Receiving	Michael Monios	10 receptions, 96 yards, TD

=== No. 24 William & Mary ===
Game Ten – No. 23 Albany Great Danes (0–0) vs No. 24 William & Mary Tribe (0–0)

Quarter	1	2	3	4	Total
No. 24 William & Mary	0	0	0	8	8
No. 23 Albany	7	10	0	7	24

at Bob Ford Field at Tom & Mary Casey Stadium • Albany, New York

- Date: Saturday, November 4, 2023
- Game time: 1:00 p.m. EST
- Game attendance: 3,518
- TV announcers (FloSports): Michael Johnson, Jr.

Game information

First quarter
Second quarter
Third quarter
Fourth quarter

Statistics	W&M	ALB
First downs		
Plays–yards		
Rushes–yards		
Passing yards		
Passing: comp–att–int		
Time of possession		

Team	Category	Player	Statistics
William & Mary	Passing		
William & Mary	Rushing		
William & Mary	Receiving		
Albany	Passing		
Albany	Rushing		
Albany	Receiving		

=== At Stony Brook ===
Game Eleven – Albany Great Danes (0–0) vs Stony Brook Seawolves (0–0)

Quarter	1	2	Total
Albany			0
Stony Brook			0

at Kenneth P. LaValle Stadium • Stony Brook, New York

- Date: Saturday, November 11, 2023
- Game time: 1:00 p.m. EST
- TV announcers (FloFootball): Jonny Wincott, Sam Kornhauser, Matt Levine

Game information

First quarter
Second quarter
Third quarter
Fourth quarter

Statistics	ALB	STBK
First downs		
Plays–yards		
Rushes–yards		
Passing yards		
Passing: comp–att–int		
Time of possession		

Team	Category	Player	Statistics
Albany	Passing		
Albany	Rushing		
Albany	Receiving		
Stony Brook	Passing		
Stony Brook	Rushing		
Stony Brook	Receiving		

=== Monmouth ===
Game Twelve – Albany Great Danes (0–0) vs Monmouth Hawks (0–0)

Quarter	1	2	Total
Monmouth			0
Albany			0

at Bob Ford Field at Tom & Mary Casey Stadium • Albany, New York

- Date: Thursday, November 16, 2023
- Game time: 1:00 p.m. EST
- TV announcers (FloFootball): Michael Johnson, Jr.

Game information

First quarter
Second quarter
Third quarter
Fourth quarter

Statistics	MON	ALB
First downs		
Plays–yards		
Rushes–yards		
Passing yards		
Passing: comp–att–int		
Time of possession		

Team	Category	Player	Statistics
Monmouth	Passing		
Monmouth	Rushing		
Monmouth	Receiving		
Albany	Passing		
Albany	Rushing		
Albany	Receiving		

== Personnel ==
Coaching staff

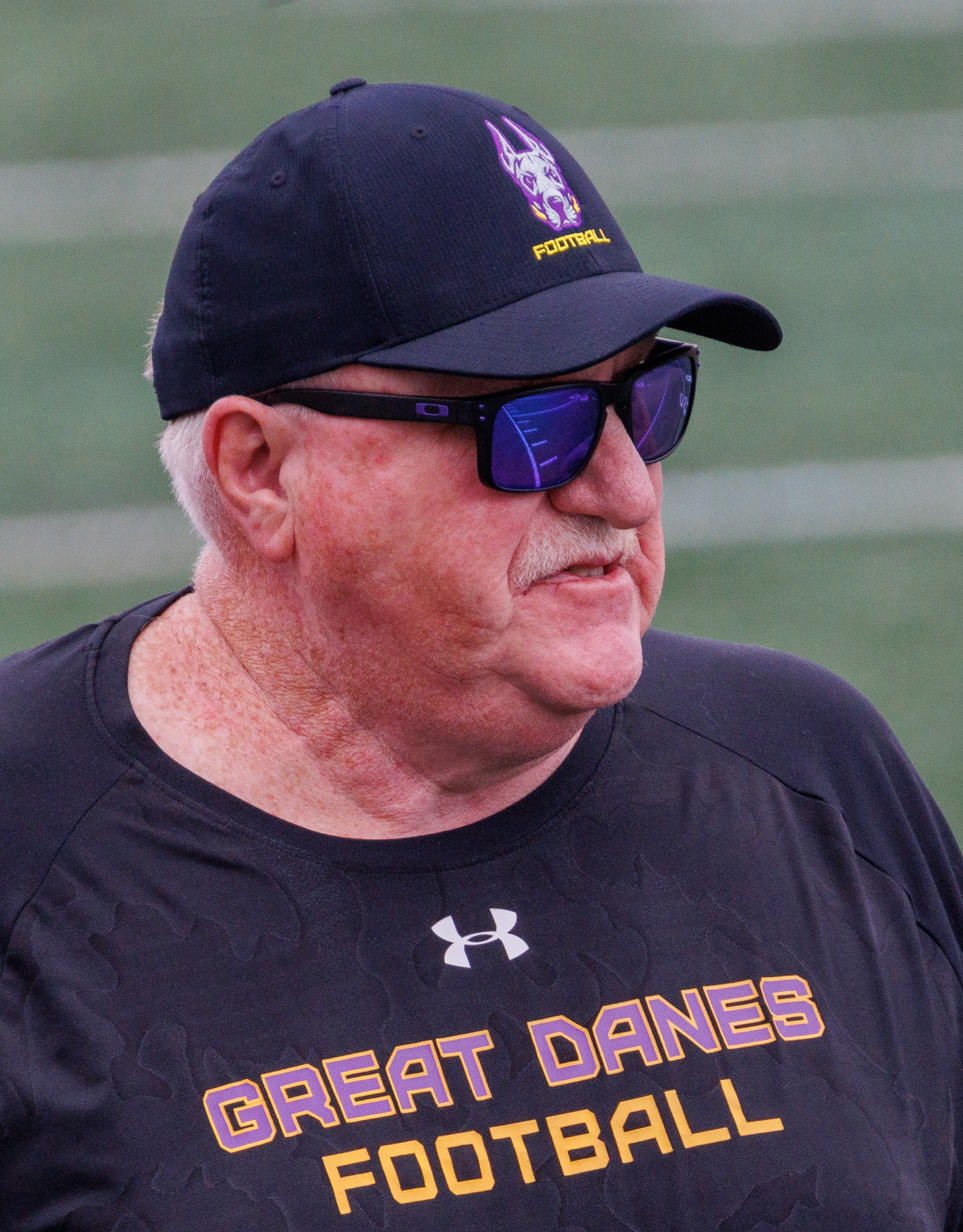
Greg Gattuso

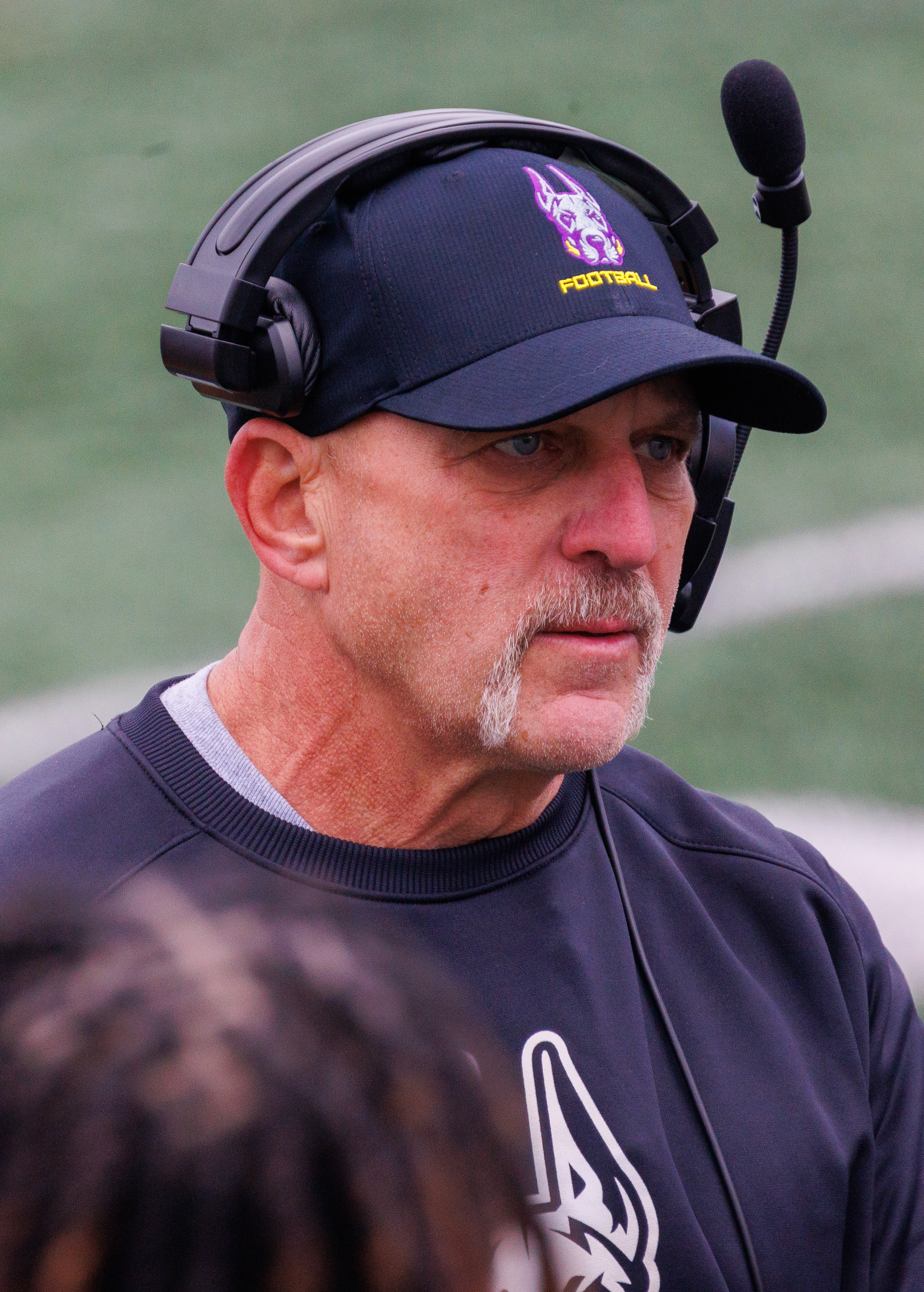
Joe Bernard

=== Coaching staff ===
Name	Position
Greg Gattuso	Head coach
Jared Ambrose	Associate head coach / offensive coordinator / quarterbacks coach
Bill Nesselt	Defensive coordinator / linebackers coach
Joe Bernard	Special teams coordinator / defensive line coach
Will Fiacchi	Wide receivers coach / passing game coordinator / recruiting coordinator
Jordan Orlovsky	Running backs coach / chief of staff
Darrin Walls	Co-defensive coordinator / cornerbacks coach
Jacob Alsadek	Offensive line coach
Chris Calabrese	Outside linebackers coach / defensive recruiting coordinator
Brendan Smith	Tight ends coach
Jon Simmons	Director of football operations / video coordinator
Matt Campion	Coaching assistant
Tim Brady	Coaching assistant

=== Roster ===
2023 Albany Great Danes Football
Quarterbacks: 7 – Reese Poffenbarger – sophomore (6'0, 208); 12 – Trey Lindsey – graduate student (6'0, 206); 14 – Aedan McDermott – freshman (6'2, 211); 17 – Jordan Rae – freshman (5'11, 204); 18 – Joe Tortello – junior (5'9, 188); Running backs: 0 – Faysal Aden – graduate student (5'7, 214); 9 – Landon Alexander – freshman (6'0, 198); 22 – Joey Koch – freshman (5'10, 198); 23 – Nate Larkins – graduate student (6'0, 224); 25 – Jose Lopez-Quinones – senior (5'9, 202); 28 – Griffin Woodell – freshman (5'10, 194); 32 – Kavon Chambers – sophomore (5'9, 207); 34 – Conrad Perry – senior (5'9, 205); Wide receivers: 1 – Julian Hicks – graduate student (6'2, 201); 2 – Roy Alexander – junior (6'1, 201); 4 – MarQeese Dietz – sophomore (5'10, 187); 8 – Levi Wentz – sophomore (6'2, 205); 10 – Jackson Parker – junior (6'1, 197); 11 – Caden Burti – sophomore (5'11, 189); 13 – Brevin Easton – senior (5'11, 197); 35 – Alex Sapienza – junior (5'10, 198); 80 – Brandon Frank – freshman (5'10, 178); 81 – Kellen Taylor – freshman (6'2, 195); 82 – Jake Lezzer – freshman (6'0, 197); 83 – Dan Whaley – junior (6'3, 201)	Tight ends: 84 – Carter Moss – freshman (6'5, 233); 85 – Haydon Broockmann – junior (6'2, 237); 86 – Dylan Walker – sophomore (6'3, 249); 87 – Ian Renninger – graduate student (6'5, 254); 88 – Chad Parker – senior (6'3, 247); 89 – Riley Engelhard – sophomore (6'4, 243); Offensive linemen: 51 – Tyson Foster – junior (6'1, 295); 53 – Joseph Black – freshman (6'0, 268); 59 – Kenneth Santos – sophomore (6'3, 282); 60 – Sean Dugery – freshman (6'1, 305); 64 – Jackson Nixon – freshman (6'4, 246); 65 – Ozzie Hutchinson – senior (6'4, 305); 66 – Chris Alabanzas – junior (5'11, 339); 67 – Emmit Harris – sophomore (6'4, 290); 69 – Stephen Demeo – sophomore (6'0, 259); 70 – Austin Mosier – junior (6'3, 302); 71 – Josh Gaffney – junior (6'3, 309); 72 – Will Marotta – senior (6'5, 325); 73 – Scott Houseman – graduate student (6'3, 321); 74 – Matt Aulicino – freshman (6'5, 244); 75 – Kevin Singer – graduate student (6'4, 290); 76 – Joe McMahon – freshman (6'6, 275); 77 – Nolan Latulippe – freshman (6'7, 281); 78 – Mike Gecik – junior (6'3, 290); 79 – Ondre Toland – junior (6'1, 319)	Defensive linemen: 4 – Anton Juncaj – senior (6'3, 273); 8 – AJ Simon – senior (6'1, 267); 54 – Brock Boyer – freshman (6'0, 240); 55 – Jayden Holmes-Cotter – freshman (6'3, 225); 56 – Neco Eberhardt – freshman (6'0, 296); 58 – Joseph Greaney – graduate student (6'3, 280); 90 – King Tshiama – freshman (6'2, 222); 91 – Ronnell McCorn – junior (6'0, 230); 92 – William Martin III – graduate student (5'11, 278); 93 – Elijah Hills – junior (6'2, 281); 94 – Ghassan Chehade – sophomore (6'5, 266); 95 – Tiny Boadu – freshman (6'0, 261); 96 – Cedric Carter – senior (6'2, 250); 97 – Matthew Obiagu – sophomore (6'5, 241); 98 – Jack Mottola – junior (6'1, 231); 99 – Anthony DiMeglio – junior (6'3, 242); Linebackers: 9 – Michael Lucien – junior (5'11, 234); 15 – Ori Jean-Charles – graduate student (6'3, 235); 16 – Ben Howe-Jones – junior (6'1, 204); 21 – Brian Abraham – graduate student (6'5, 221); 31 – Jahlil Johnson – sophomore (6'2, 209); 41 – Dillon Dunathan – freshman (6'1, 229); 42 – Dylan Kelly – senior (6'2, 224); 44 – Sammy Knipe – sophomore (6'1, 233); 45 – Cole Esposito – senior (5'11, 222); 46 – Matthew Rappa – freshman (6'0, 213); 50 – John Dodaro – freshman (6'1, 222); 57 – Troy Berschwinger – freshman (6'1, 226)	Defensive backs: 0 – DaeSean Winston – graduate student (6'0, 206); 1 – Aamir Hall – junior (6'1, 201); 3 – Brad Igweike – junior (5'8, 177); 5 – Bill Hackett – senior (5'7, 180); 7 – Larry Walker Jr. – senior (5'11, 197); 13 – Mike Coleman – graduate student (5'10, 160); 14 – Kevon Angry – senior (5'9, 178); 19 – Isaac Duffy – graduate student (5'8, 184); 20 – Denzel Patrick – junior (5'11, 200); 24 – Cam Stodghill – freshman (6'2, 190); 27 – Tyler Merwarth – sophomore (5'11, 199); 29 – Parris Smiley – sophomore (5'11, 197); 30 – Nick Totten – sophomore (5'11, 193); 33 – Rykim Lemon – graduate student; 36 – Babajide Akinola – junior (5'8, 165); Placekickers: 37 – John Opalko – junior (5'11, 180); 38 – Sam Hogan – graduate student (6'0, 182); 39 – Steven Sadek – freshman (5'11, 156); 49 – Tyler Pucci – freshman (6'2, 173); Punters: 6 – Tyler Pastula – senior (6'3, 217)'; 48 – Michael Sbuttoni – freshman (5'9, 181); Long snapper: 47 – Russell Dietz – junior (5'10, 231); 52 – Stephen Sokach-Minnick – senior (6'0, 233)
Source and player details, 2023 Albany Great Danes (1/22/2025):

== Statistics ==
=== Team ===
	Albany	Opp
Scoring		
Points per game		
Points per Turnovers		
First downs		
Rushing		
Passing		
Penalty		
Rushing yards		
Avg per play		
Avg per game		
Rushing touchdowns		
Passing yards		
Att-Comp-Int		
Avg per pass		
Avg per catch		
Avg per game		
Passing touchdowns		
Total offense		
Plays		
Avg per play		
Avg per game		
Fumbles-Lost		
Penalties-Yards		
Avg per game		

	Albany	Opp
Punt-Yards		
Avg per play		
Avg per punt net		
Punt Return-Yards		
Avg per punt return		
Kickoffs-Yards		
Avg per play		
Avg per kick net		
Kickoff Return-Yards		
Avg per kickoff return		
Interceptions-Yards		
Avg per play		
Time of possession / game		
3rd down conversions (Pct%)	(0%)	(0%)
4th down conversions (Pct%)	(0%)	(0%)
Touchdowns scored		
Field goals-Attempts		
PAT-Attempts		
2 point conversion-attempts		
Sack by Yards		
Misc Yards		
Safeties		
Onside kicks		
Red zone scores	(0%)	(0%)
Red zone touchdowns	(0%)	(0%)
Attendance		
Date/Avg per date		
Neutral Site		

=== Individual leaders ===
Passing statistics
#	NAME	POS	RAT	CMP-ATT-INT	YDS	AVG/G	CMP%	TD	LONG
		QB	0.0	0-0-0	0 yrds		0.0%	0 TDs	0
	TOTALS		0.0	0-0-0	0 yrds	0.0	0.0%	0 TDs	0

Rushing statistics
#	NAME	POS	ATT	GAIN	AVG	TD	LONG	AVG/G
		RB	0	0 yrds	0.0	0 TDs	0	0.0
	TOTALS		0	0 yrds	0.0	0 TDs	0	0.0

Receiving statistics
#	NAME	POS	CTH	YDS	AVG	TD	LONG	AVG/G
		WR	0	0 yrds	0.0	0 TDs	0	0.0
	TOTALS		67	730 yrds	10.9	10 TDs	38	243.3

==== Defense ====
Defense statistics
#	NAME	POS	SOLO	AST	TOT	TFL-YDS	SACK-YDS	INT-YDS-TD	BU	QBH	RCV-YDS	FF	BLK	SAF
			0	0	0	0-0 yrds	0-0 yrds	-	-	-	-	-	-	-
	TOTAL		0	0	0	0-0 yrds	0-0 yrds	0-0 yrds- 0 TDs	0	0	-	0	0	-

Key: POS: Position, SOLO: Solo Tackles, AST: Assisted Tackles, TOT: Total Tackles, TFL: Tackles-for-loss, SACK: Quarterback Sacks, INT: Interceptions, BU: Passes Broken Up, PD: Passes Defended, QBH: Quarterback Hits, FR: Fumbles Recovered, FF: Forced Fumbles, BLK: Kicks or Punts Blocked, SAF: Safeties, TD : Touchdown

==== Special teams ====
Kicking/off statistics
#	NAME	POS	XPM-XPA (XP%)	FGM-FGA (FG%)	1–19	20–29	30–39	40–49	50+	PTS	LNG	KICKS	YDS	AVG	TB	OB
		PK	0-0 (0.0%)	0-0 (0.0%)	-/-	-/-	-/-	-/-	-/-	0 pts	0	0	0 yrds	0.0	0	-
	TOTALS		0-0 (0.0%)	0-0 (0.0%)	-/-	-/-	-/-	-/-	-/-	0	0	0	0 yrds	0.0	0	-

Punting statistics
#	NAME	POS	PUNTS	YDS	AVG	LONG	TB	FC	I–20	50+	BLK
		P	-	-	-	-	-	-	-	-	-
	Team	--	0	-	-	-	-	-	-	-	0
	TOTALS		0	0 yrds	0.0	0	0	0	0	0	1

Kick return statistics
#	NAME	POS	RTNS	YDS	AVG	TD	LNG
			-	-	-	-	-
	TOTALS		0	0 yrds	0.0	0 TD's	0

Punt return statistics
#	NAME	POS	RTNS	YDS	AVG	TD	LONG
			-	-	-	-	-
	TOTALS		0	0 yrds	0.0	0 TD's	0
