= 2023 Villanova Wildcats football team =

American college football season

2023 Villanova Wildcats football

CAA co-champion

NCAA Division I Quarterfinal, L 12–23 at South Dakota State
- Conference: CAA Football Conference

Ranking
- STATS: No. 6
- FCS Coaches: No. 9
- Record: 10–3 (7–1 CAA)
- Head coach: Mark Ferrante (7th season)
- Offensive coordinator: Chris Boden (5th season)
- Offensive scheme: Spread
- Defensive coordinator: Ross Pennypacker (2nd season)
- Base defense: Multiple 3–3–5
- Home stadium: Villanova Stadium

2023 Coastal Athletic Association Football Conference standings
	Conf.			Overall
Team	W		L	W		L
No. 5 Albany +^	7	–	1	11	–	4
No. 6 Villanova +^	7	–	1	10	–	3
No. 15 Richmond +^	7	–	1	9	–	4
No. 10 Delaware ^	6	–	2	9	–	4
Elon	6	–	2	6	–	5
New Hampshire	4	–	4	6	–	5
Rhode Island	4	–	4	6	–	5
William & Mary	4	–	4	6	–	5
Campbell	4	–	4	5	–	6
Towson	4	–	4	5	–	6
Hampton	3	–	5	5	–	6
Monmouth	3	–	5	4	–	7
Maine	1	–	7	2	–	9
North Carolina A&T	0	–	8	1	–	10
Stony Brook	0	–	8	0	–	10
+ – Conference co-champions; ^ – FCS playoff participant; Rankings from STATS Poll

The 2023 Villanova Wildcats football team represented Villanova University as a member of the Coastal Athletic Association Football Conference (CAA) during the 2023 NCAA Division I FCS football season. The Wildcats were led by seventh-year head coach Mark Ferrante and played home games at Villanova Stadium in Villanova, Pennsylvania.

The CAA, formerly known as the Colonial Athletic Association from 2007 through 2022, changed its name in July 2023 to accommodate future membership expansion outside of the Thirteen Colonies.

== Schedule ==
Date	Time	Opponent	Rank	Site	TV	Result	Attendance
September 2	12:00 p.m.	at Lehigh*		Goodman Stadium; Bethlehem, PA	ESPN+	W 38–10	4,360
September 9	6:00 p.m.	Colgate*		Villanova Stadium; Villanova, PA	FloSports	W 42–19	5,101
September 16	6:30 p.m.	at UCF*	No. 24	FBC Mortgage Stadium; Orlando, FL	ESPN+	L 14–48	44,206
September 23	2:00 p.m.	No. 17 Rhode Island	No. 25	Villanova Stadium; Villanova, PA	FloSports	W 35–9	5,913
September 30	3:30 p.m.	at Albany	No. 16	Bob Ford Field; Albany, NY	FloSports	L 10–31	7,071
October 7	4:00 p.m.	at North Carolina A&T		Truist Stadium; Greensboro, NC	FloSports	W 37–14	8,098
October 14	1:00 p.m.	Elon		Villanova Stadium; Villanova, PA	FloSports	W 21–0	2,429
October 28	2:00 p.m.	Stony Brook^{†}	No. 19	Villanova Stadium; Villanova, PA	FloSports	W 48–13	5,119
November 4	1:00 p.m.	at New Hampshire	No. 17	Wildcat Stadium; Durham, NH	FloSports	W 45–33	6,633
November 11	1:00 p.m.	Towson	No. 13	Villanova Stadium; Villanova, PA	FloSports	W 33–10	4,819
November 18	1:00 p.m.	at No. 7 Delaware	No. 10	Delaware Stadium; Newark, DE (Battle of the Blue)	FloSports, NBC Sports Philadelphia	W 35–7	17,718
December 2	12:00 p.m.	No. 21 Youngstown State*	No. 6	Villanova Stadium; Villanova, PA (NCAA Division I Second Round)	ESPN+	W 45–28	2,015
December 9	12:00 p.m.	at No. 1 South Dakota State*	No. 6	Dana J. Dykhouse Stadium; Brookings, SD (NCAA Division I Quarterfinal)	ESPN	L 12–23	10,216
*Non-conference game; ^{†}Homecoming; Rankings from STATS Poll released prior to the game; All times are in Eastern time

== Game summaries ==
=== at UCF (FBS) ===
No. 24 (FCS) Villanova Wildcats at UCF Knights

Quarter	1	2	3	4	Total
No. 24 (FCS) Wildcats	0	0	0	14	14
Knights	17	17	7	7	48

at FBC Mortgage Stadium, Orlando, FL

- Date: September 16, 2023
- Game time: 6:30 pm EDT
- Game attendance: 44,206
- TV announcers (ESPN+): Drew Fellios and Forrest Conoly
- Gamecast

Game information

First Quarter

- UCF: Colton Boomer 26-yard field goal, 9:21
- UCF: Jordan McDonald 1-yard touchdown run (Colton Boomer kick), 4:51
- UCF: Jordan McDonald 1-yard touchdown run (Colton Boomer kick), 1:01

Second Quarter

- UCF: R.J. Harvey 5-yard touchdown run (Colton Boomer kick), 7:47
- UCF: Javon Baker 25 Yd pass from Timmy McClain (Colton Boomer kick), 5:04
- UCF: Colton Boomer 41-yard field goal, 0:25

Third Quarter

- UCF: R.J. Harvey 24-yard touchdown run (Colton Boomer kick), 5:12

Fourth Quarter

- Villanova: Connor Watkins 3-yard touchdown run (Matthew Mercurio kick), 13:42
- UCF: Jaylon Griffin 36-yard touchdown pass from Timmy McClain (Colton Boomer kick), 11:22
- Villanova: T.D. Ayo-Durojaiye 11-yard touchdown run (Matthew Mercurio kick), 4:44

Win Probability

- UCF 95.9%

Line

- N/A

Over/Under

- N/A

Statistics	NOVA	UCF
First downs	11	31
Total yards	228	600
Rushing yards	84	251
Passing yards	144	349
Turnovers	1	0
Time of possession	27:08	32:52

Team	Category	Player	Statistics
Villanova	Passing	Connor Watkins	9-23, 144 yards, 1 INT
Villanova	Rushing	Deewil Barlee	7 carries, 39 yards
Villanova	Receiving	Jaylan Sanchez	1 receptions, 45 yards
UCF	Passing	Timmy McClain	20-28, 321 yards, 2 TD, 0 INT
UCF	Rushing	R. J. Harvey	14 carries, 85 yards, 2 TD
UCF	Receiving	Kobe Hudson	6 receptions, 147 yards
