= 2023 Delaware Fightin' Blue Hens football team =

American college football season

2023 Delaware Fightin' Blue Hens football

NCAA Division I Second Round, L 19–49 at Montana
- Conference: CAA Football Conference

Ranking
- STATS: No. 10
- FCS Coaches: No. 11
- Record: 9–4 (6–2 CAA)
- Head coach: Ryan Carty (2nd season)
- Offensive scheme: Spread option
- Defensive coordinator: Manny Rojas (4th season)
- Base defense: 3–3–5
- Home stadium: Delaware Stadium

2023 Coastal Athletic Association Football Conference standings
	Conf.			Overall
Team	W		L	W		L
No. 5 Albany +^	7	–	1	11	–	4
No. 6 Villanova +^	7	–	1	10	–	3
No. 15 Richmond +^	7	–	1	9	–	4
No. 10 Delaware ^	6	–	2	9	–	4
Elon	6	–	2	6	–	5
New Hampshire	4	–	4	6	–	5
Rhode Island	4	–	4	6	–	5
William & Mary	4	–	4	6	–	5
Campbell	4	–	4	5	–	6
Towson	4	–	4	5	–	6
Hampton	3	–	5	5	–	6
Monmouth	3	–	5	4	–	7
Maine	1	–	7	2	–	9
North Carolina A&T	0	–	8	1	–	10
Stony Brook	0	–	8	0	–	10
+ – Conference co-champions; ^ – FCS playoff participant; Rankings from STATS Poll

The 2023 Delaware Fightin' Blue Hens football team represented the University of Delaware as a member of the Coastal Athletic Association Football Conference (CAA) during the 2023 NCAA Division I FCS football season. They were led by second-year head coach Ryan Carty and played their home games at Delaware Stadium in Newark, Delaware.

The CAA, formerly known as the Colonial Athletic Association from 2007 through 2022, changed its name in July 2023 to accommodate future membership expansion outside of the Thirteen Colonies.

The Delaware Fightin' Blue Hens football team drew an average home attendance of 15,564 in 2023.

== Schedule ==
Date	Time	Opponent	Rank	Site	TV	Result	Attendance
August 31	7 p.m.	at Stony Brook	No. 22	Kenneth P. LaValle Stadium; Stony Brook, NY	FloSports	W 37–13	11,132
September 9	Noon	at No. 7 (FBS) Penn State*	No. 19	Beaver Stadium; University Park, PA	Peacock	L 7–63	108,575
September 16	6 p.m.	Saint Francis (PA)*	No. 22	Delaware Stadium; Newark, DE	FloSports	W 42–14	16,332
September 23	6 p.m.	No. 11 New Hampshire	No. 19	Delaware Stadium; Newark, DE	FloSports	W 29–25	10,618
October 7	3 p.m.	Duquesne*	No. 9	Delaware Stadium; Newark, DE	FloSports	W 43–17	18,952
October 14	3 p.m.	North Carolina A&T^{†}	No. 8	Delaware Stadium; Newark, DE	FloSports	W 21–6	13,041
October 21	2 p.m.	at Hampton	No. 7	Armstrong Stadium; Hampton, VA	FloSports	W 47–3	4,186
October 28	1 p.m.	at Towson	No. 5	Johnny Unitas Stadium; Towson, MD	FloSports	W 51–13	4,238
November 4	1 p.m.	Elon	No. 5	Delaware Stadium; Newark, DE	FloSports	L 27–33	16,722
November 11	1 p.m.	at Campbell	No. 8	Barker–Lane Stadium; Buies Creek, NC	FloSports	W 45–7	3,786
November 18	1 p.m.	No. 10 Villanova	No. 7	Delaware Stadium; Newark, DE (Battle of the Blue)	FloSports, NBC Sports Philadelphia	L 7–35	17,718
November 25	2 p.m.	No. 20 Lafayette*	No. 11	Delaware Stadium; Newark, DE (NCAA Division I First Round)	ESPN+	W 36–34	4,039
December 2	9 p.m.	at No. 2 Montana*	No. 11	Washington–Grizzly Stadium; Missoula, MT (NCAA Division I Second Round)	ESPN+	L 19–49	20,580
*Non-conference game; ^{†}Homecoming; Rankings from STATS Poll released prior to the game; All times are in Eastern time
