= Vincent Brown (linebacker) =

American football player and coach (born 1965)

Personal information
- Born: January 9, 1965 (age 61); Atlanta, Georgia, U.S.
- Listed height: 6 ft 1 in (1.85 m)
- Listed weight: 245 lb (111 kg)

Career information
- High school: George (Atlanta)
- College: Mississippi Valley State (1984–1987)
- NFL draft: 1988: 2nd round, 43rd overall pick

Career history

Playing
- New England Patriots (1988–1995)

Coaching
- Meadowcreek HS (GA) (2001–2005) Assistant; Dallas Cowboys (2006) Inside linebackers coach; Virginia (2007) Graduate assistant; Richmond (2008–2009) Linebackers coach; Virginia (2010–2012) Linebackers coach/special teams coordinator; Virginia (2013) Defensive line coach; Connecticut (2014–2015) Co-defensive coordinator/linebackers coach; Connecticut (2016) Co-defensive coordinator/defensive line coach; Howard (2017–2018) Assistant head coach/defensive coordinator/linebackers coach; William & Mary (2019–2022) Assistant head coach/defensive coordinator/linebackers coach; North Carolina A&T (2023–2024) Head coach

Awards and highlights
- Second-team All-Pro (1991); New England Patriots All-1990s Team

Career NFL statistics
- Total tackles: 811
- Sacks: 16.5
- Interceptions: 10
- Forced fumbles: 6
- Total touchdowns: 2
- Stats at Pro Football Reference

Head coaching record
- Career: 2–21

Vincent Bernard "the Undertaker" Brown (born January 9, 1965) is an American football coach and former player.

== Playing career ==
Pre-draft measurables
Height	Weight	Hand span	40-yard dash	10-yard split	20-yard split	20-yard shuttle	Vertical jump	Broad jump	Bench press
6 ft 1 1/8 in (1.86 m)	245 lb (111 kg)	11 in (0.28 m)	4.86 s	1.67 s	2.78 s	4.68 s	32.0 in (0.81 m)	9 ft 4 in (2.84 m)	24 reps

He played professionally in the National Football League (NFL) linebacker with the New England Patriots from 1988 to 1995. He was selected by the Patriots in the second round of the 1988 NFL draft. Brown's NFL career ended abruptly at age 30. After eight years of playing linebacker for the Patriots, he was suddenly and unexpectedly told that his career was over. His career was one of the best in Patriots history as an inside linebacker.

== Coaching career ==
On January 6, 2023, Brown was hired to become the next head coach of North Carolina A&T. On December 4, 2024, Brown was fired by North Carolina A&T after two seasons with a 2–21 record and one win in each season.

== Head coaching record ==
Year	Team	Overall	Conference	Standing	Bowl/playoffs
North Carolina A&T Aggies (Coastal Athletic Association Football Conference) (2023–2024)
2023	North Carolina A&T	1–10	0–8	T–14th	
2024	North Carolina A&T	1–11	0–8	T–15th	
North Carolina A&T:		2–21	0–16		
Total:		2–21			
