= 2023 William & Mary Tribe football team =

American college football season

2023 William & Mary Tribe football
- Conference: CAA Football Conference
- Record: 6–5 (4–4 CAA)
- Head coach: Mike London (5th season)
- Offensive coordinator: Christian Taylor (4th season)
- Co-defensive coordinators: Ras-I Dowling (1st season); Bo Revell (1st season)
- Home stadium: Zable Stadium

2023 Coastal Athletic Association Football Conference standings
	Conf.			Overall
Team	W		L	W		L
No. 5 Albany +^	7	–	1	11	–	4
No. 6 Villanova +^	7	–	1	10	–	3
No. 15 Richmond +^	7	–	1	9	–	4
No. 10 Delaware ^	6	–	2	9	–	4
Elon	6	–	2	6	–	5
New Hampshire	4	–	4	6	–	5
Rhode Island	4	–	4	6	–	5
William & Mary	4	–	4	6	–	5
Campbell	4	–	4	5	–	6
Towson	4	–	4	5	–	6
Hampton	3	–	5	5	–	6
Monmouth	3	–	5	4	–	7
Maine	1	–	7	2	–	9
North Carolina A&T	0	–	8	1	–	10
Stony Brook	0	–	8	0	–	10
+ – Conference co-champions; ^ – FCS playoff participant; Rankings from STATS Poll

The 2023 William & Mary Tribe football team represented the College of William & Mary as a member of the Coastal Athletic Association Football Conference (CAA) during the 2023 NCAA Division I FCS football season. The Tribe, led by fifth-year head coach Mike London, played their home games at Zable Stadium. The Tribe finished with a 6–5 overall record (4–4 CAA). The William & Mary Tribe football team drew an average home attendance of 10,268 in 2023.

The CAA, formerly known as the Colonial Athletic Association from 2007 through 2022, changed its name in July 2023 to accommodate future membership expansion outside of the Thirteen Colonies.

== Preseason ==
=== CAA poll ===
In the CAA preseason poll released on July 25, 2023, the Tribe were predicted to finish in first place out of 15 teams following the addition of Campbell and North Carolina A&T for the 2023 season.

Predicted finish	Team	Votes (1st place)
1	William & Mary	195 (13)
2	New Hampshire	195 (1)
3	Richmond	159
4	Delaware	149 (1)
5	Elon	146
6	Rhode Island	135
7	Villanova	129
8	Monmouth	94
9	Towson	85
10	North Carolina A&T	70
11	Albany	64
12	Campbell	62
13	Maine	40
14	Stony Brook	38
15	Hampton	30

=== Preseason All-CAA team ===
Junior linebacker John Pius, redshirt senior running back Bronson Yoder, junior offensive lineman Charles Grant, redshirt senior defensive lineman Nate Lynn, redshirt senior linebacker Isaiah Jones, redshirt senior cornerback Ryan Poole, and redshirt sophomore cornerback Jalen Jones were named to the CAA preseason all-conference team. Pius was also named the preseason CAA Defensive Player of the Year, an award he won in 2022. W&M's seven all-conference picks were the most of any team in the league, while its five defensive selections also led all schools.

== Schedule ==
Date	Time	Opponent	Rank	Site	TV	Result	Attendance
August 31	7:00 p.m.	at Campbell	No. 4	Barker–Lane Stadium; Buies Creek, NC	FloSports	W 34–24	4,167
September 9	6:00 p.m.	Wofford*	No. 4	Zable Stadium; Williamsburg, VA	FloSports	W 23–6	8,579
September 16	4:00 p.m.	at Charleston Southern*	No. 4	Buccaneer Field; North Charleston, SC	ESPN+	W 15–7	3,914
September 23	3:30 p.m.	Maine	No. 5	Zable Stadium; Williamsburg, VA	FloSports	W 28–3	7,365
September 30	2:00 p.m.	at Elon	No. 5	Rhodes Stadium; Elon, NC	FloSports	L 6–14	12,705
October 7	12:00 p.m.	at Virginia*	No. 10	Scott Stadium; Charlottesville, VA	ACCN	L 13–27	38,289
October 21	3:30 p.m.	Towson^{†}	No. 13	Zable Stadium; Williamsburg, VA	FloSports	L 24–34	13,713
October 28	1:00 p.m.	Monmouth	No. 22	Zable Stadium; Williamsburg, VA	FloSports	W 31–28	11,340
November 4	1:00 p.m.	at No. 23 Albany	No. 24	Bob Ford Field at Tom & Mary Casey Stadium; Albany, NY	FloSports	L 8–24	3,518
November 11	1:00 p.m.	at Hampton		Armstrong Stadium; Hampton, VA	FloSports	W 31–10	5,168
November 18	1:00 p.m.	Richmond		Zable Stadium; Williamsburg, VA (Capital Cup)	FloSports	L 26–27	10,345
*Non-conference game; ^{†}Homecoming; Rankings from STATS Poll released prior to the game; All times are in Eastern time

== Game summaries ==
=== At Campbell ===
	1	2	3	4	Total
No. 4 Tribe	7	17	3	7	34
Fighting Camels	7	7	0	10	24

=== Wofford ===
	1	2	3	4	Total
Terriers	3	3	0	0	6
No. 4 Tribe	7	13	0	3	23

=== At Charleston Southern ===
	1	2	3	4	Total
No. 4 Tribe	8	0	7	0	15
Buccaneers	7	0	0	0	7

=== Maine ===
	1	2	3	4	Total
Black Bears	0	3	0	0	3
No. 5 Tribe	0	7	14	7	28

Statistics	Maine	William & Mary
First downs	7	18
Total yards	138	390
Rushing yards	53	331
Passing yards	85	59
Turnovers	1	1
Time of possession	23:08	36:52

Team	Category	Player	Statistics
Maine	Passing	Derek Robertson	10-22, 85 yards, INT
Maine	Rushing	Tristen Kenan	12 rushes, 30 yards
Maine	Receiving	Rohan Jones	3 receptions, 33 yards
William & Mary	Passing	Darius Wilson	8-13, 59 yards, TD
William & Mary	Rushing	Bronson Yoder	25 rushes, 163 yards, TD
William & Mary	Receiving	JT Mayo	3 receptions, 29 yards, TD

=== At Elon ===
	1	2	3	4	Total
No. 5 Tribe	0	6	0	0	6
Phoenix	0	0	0	14	14

=== At Virginia ===
	1	2	3	4	Total
No. 10 Tribe	6	7	0	0	13
Cavaliers	3	17	0	7	27

=== Towson ===
	1	2	3	4	Total
Tigers	0	3	14	17	34
No. 13 Tribe	10	7	0	7	24

=== Monmouth ===
	1	2	3	4	Total
Hawks	7	0	14	7	28
No. 22 Tribe	0	21	3	7	31

=== At No. 23 Albany ===
	1	2	3	4	Total
No. 24 Tribe	0	0	0	8	8
No. 23 Great Danes	7	10	0	7	24

=== At Hampton ===
	1	2	3	4	Total
Tribe	7	0	0	24	31
Pirates	0	10	0	0	10

=== Richmond ===
	1	2	3	4	Total
Spiders	7	10	3	7	27
Tribe	7	3	0	16	26
