= 2023 Hampton Pirates football team =

American college football season

2023 Hampton Pirates football
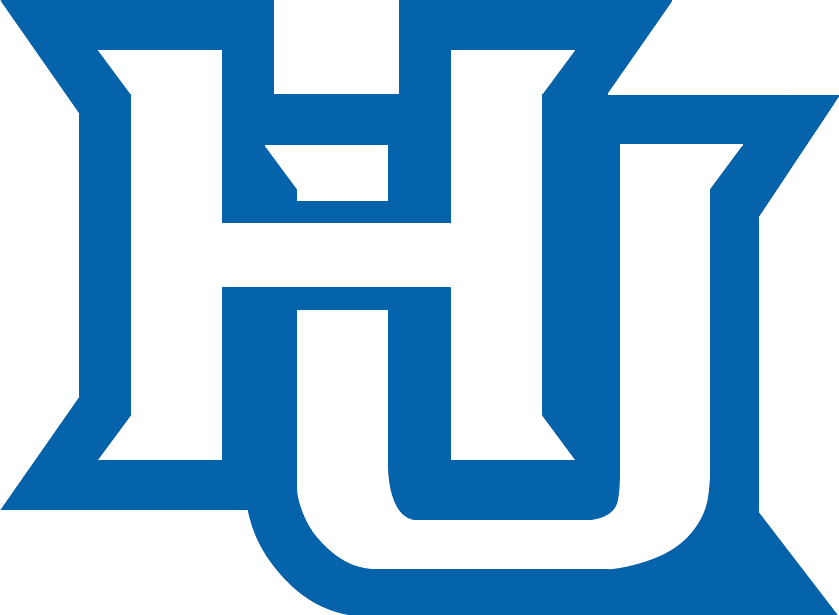
- Conference: CAA Football Conference
- Record: 5–6 (3–5 CAA)
- Head coach: Robert Prunty (5th season)
- Offensive coordinator: Zack Patterson (4th season)
- Co-defensive coordinators: Chris Cosh (2nd season); Todd McComb (4th season)
- Home stadium: Armstrong Stadium

2023 Coastal Athletic Association Football Conference standings
	Conf.			Overall
Team	W		L	W		L
No. 5 Albany +^	7	–	1	11	–	4
No. 6 Villanova +^	7	–	1	10	–	3
No. 15 Richmond +^	7	–	1	9	–	4
No. 10 Delaware ^	6	–	2	9	–	4
Elon	6	–	2	6	–	5
New Hampshire	4	–	4	6	–	5
Rhode Island	4	–	4	6	–	5
William & Mary	4	–	4	6	–	5
Campbell	4	–	4	5	–	6
Towson	4	–	4	5	–	6
Hampton	3	–	5	5	–	6
Monmouth	3	–	5	4	–	7
Maine	1	–	7	2	–	9
North Carolina A&T	0	–	8	1	–	10
Stony Brook	0	–	8	0	–	10
+ – Conference co-champions; ^ – FCS playoff participant; Rankings from STATS Poll

The 2023 Hampton Pirates football team represented Hampton University as a member of the Coastal Athletic Association Football Conference (CAA) during the 2023 NCAA Division I FCS football season. Led by fourth-year head coach Robert Prunty, the Pirates played home games at the Armstrong Stadium in Hampton, Virginia.

The CAA, formerly known as the Colonial Athletic Association from 2007 through 2022, changed its name in July 2023 to accommodate future membership expansion outside of the Thirteen Colonies.

== Schedule ==
Date	Time	Opponent	Site	TV	Result	Attendance
September 2	3:00 p.m.	vs. Grambling State*	Red Bull Arena; Harrison, NJ (Brick City Classic)	NFLN	W 35–31	7,500
September 9	6:00 p.m.	Norfolk State*	Armstrong Stadium; Hampton, VA (Battle of the Bay)	FloSports	L 23–31	10,021
September 16	3:30 p.m.	at Howard*	Audi Field; Washington, DC (The Real HU)	ESPN+	W 35–34	16,630
September 30	2:00 p.m.	at Richmond	Barker-Lane Stadium; Buies Creek, NC	FloSports	W 31–14	7,203
October 7	2:00 p.m.	Campbell	Armstrong Stadium; Hampton, VA	FloSports	L 27–30	3,968
October 14	1:00 p.m.	at Monmouth	Kessler Field; West Long Branch, NJ	FloSports	L 10–61	1,827
October 21	2:00 p.m.	No. 7 Delaware	Armstrong Stadium; Hampton, VA	FloSports	L 3–47	4,186
October 28	2:00 p.m.	North Carolina A&T^{†}	Armstrong Stadium; Hampton, VA	FloSports	W 26–24	13,811
November 4	1:00 p.m.	at Maine	Alfond Stadium; Orono, ME	FloSports	W 42–35	3,115
November 11	1:00 p.m.	William & Mary	Armstrong Stadium; Hampton, VA	FloSports	L 10–31	5,168
November 18	1:00 p.m.	at Elon	Rhodes Stadium; Elon, NC	FloSports	L 14–51	4,625
*Non-conference game; ^{†}Homecoming; Rankings from STATS Poll released prior to the game; All times are in Eastern time
