= 2023 Monmouth Hawks football team =

American college football season

2023 Monmouth Hawks football
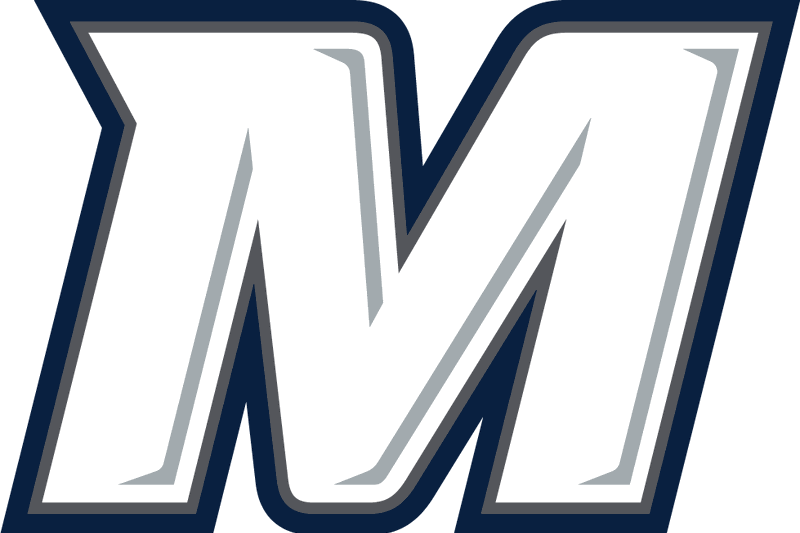
- Conference: CAA Football Conference
- Record: 4–7 (3–5 CAA)
- Head coach: Kevin Callahan (31st season)
- Offensive coordinator: Jeff Gallo (5th season)
- Offensive scheme: Air raid
- Defensive coordinator: Andy Bobik (30th season)
- Base defense: 4–3
- Home stadium: Kessler Stadium

2023 Coastal Athletic Association Football Conference standings
	Conf.			Overall
Team	W		L	W		L
No. 5 Albany +^	7	–	1	11	–	4
No. 6 Villanova +^	7	–	1	10	–	3
No. 15 Richmond +^	7	–	1	9	–	4
No. 10 Delaware ^	6	–	2	9	–	4
Elon	6	–	2	6	–	5
New Hampshire	4	–	4	6	–	5
Rhode Island	4	–	4	6	–	5
William & Mary	4	–	4	6	–	5
Campbell	4	–	4	5	–	6
Towson	4	–	4	5	–	6
Hampton	3	–	5	5	–	6
Monmouth	3	–	5	4	–	7
Maine	1	–	7	2	–	9
North Carolina A&T	0	–	8	1	–	10
Stony Brook	0	–	8	0	–	10
+ – Conference co-champions; ^ – FCS playoff participant; Rankings from STATS Poll

The 2023 Monmouth Hawks football team represented Monmouth University in the Coastal Athletic Association Football Conference (CAA) during the 2023 NCAA Division I FCS football season. The Hawks played their home games at the Kessler Stadium in West Long Branch, New Jersey. The team was coached by 31st-year head coach Kevin Callahan.

The CAA, formerly known as the Colonial Athletic Association from 2007 through 2022, changed its name in July 2023 to accommodate future membership expansion outside of the Thirteen Colonies.

== Schedule ==
Date	Time	Opponent	Site	TV	Result	Attendance
September 2	6:00 p.m.	at Florida Atlantic*	FAU Stadium; Boca Raton, FL	ESPN+	L 20–42	20,893
September 9	6:00 p.m.	at Towson	Johnny Unitas Stadium; Towson, MD	FloSports	W 42–23	3,442
September 16	1:00 p.m.	Campbell	Kessler Field; West Long Branch, NJ	FloSports	L 31–45	2,643
September 23	3:30 p.m.	at Lafayette*	Fisher Stadium; Easton, PA	ESPN+	L 20–28	1,497
September 30	1:00 p.m.	Lehigh*^{†}	Kessler Field; West Long Branch, NJ	FloSports	W 49–7	3,266
October 14	1:00 p.m.	Hampton	Kessler Field; West Long Branch, NJ	FloSports	W 61–10	1,827
October 21	2:00 p.m.	at Elon	Rhodes Stadium; Elon, NC	FloSports	L 26–28	5,891
October 28	1:00 p.m.	at No. 22 William & Mary	Zable Stadium; Williamsburg, VA	FloSports	L 28–31	11,340
November 4	1:00 p.m.	Stony Brook	Kessler Field; West Long Branch, NJ	FloSports	W 56–17	3,876
November 11	12:00 p.m.	New Hampshire	Kessler Field; West Long Branch, NJ	FloSports	L 24–31	2,596
November 18	1:00 p.m.	at No. 12 Albany	Bob Ford Field; Albany, NY	FloSports	L 0–41	3,505
*Non-conference game; ^{†}Homecoming; Rankings from STATS Poll released prior to the game; All times are in Eastern time

== Game summaries ==
=== at Florida Atlantic (FBS) ===
Monmouth Hawks (0–0) vs Florida Atlantic Owls (FBS) (0–0) – Game summary

Quarter	1	2	3	4	Total
Hawks	7	7	0	6	20
Owls (FBS)	14	14	14	0	42

at FAU Stadium • Boca Raton, Florida

- Date: September 2
- Game time: 6:00 p.m. EDT
- Game weather: Sunny • Temperature: 87 °F (31 °C) • Wind: NE at 12 miles per hour (19 km/h)
- Game attendance: 20,893
- Referee: Darryl DeBerry
- TV announcers (ESPN+): Ted Emrich (play-by-play), Leger Douzable (analyst)

Game information

First quarter

- (11:28) FAU – Larry McCammon 6 yard run, Logan Lupo kick (Drive: 5 plays, 80 yards, 1:30; Florida Atlantic 7–0)
- (6:46) FAU – Tony Johnson 9 yard pass from Casey Thompson, Logan Lupo kick (Drive: 7 plays, 79 yards, 2:40; Florida Atlantic 14–0)
- (1:53) MONM – Sone Ntoh 2 yard run, Michael Calton Jr. kick (Drive: 13 plays, 75 yards, 4:53; Florida Atlantic 14–7)

Second quarter

- (14:14) FAU – LaJohntay Wester 2 yard pass from Casey Thompson, Logan Lupo kick (Drive: 7 plays, 75 yards, 2:39; Florida Atlantic 21–7)
- (6:48) FAU – Je’Quan Burton 8 yard pass from Casey Thompson, Logan Lupo kick (Drive: 2 plays, 29 yards, 0:29; Florida Atlantic 28–7)
- (0:25) MONM – Assanti Kearney 27 yard pass from Marquez McCray, Michael Calton Jr. kick (Drive: 9 plays, 62 yards, 2:08; Florida Atlantic 28–14)

Third quarter

- (6:59) FAU – Je’Quan Burton 35 yard pass from Casey Thompson, Logan Lupo kick (Drive: 6 plays, 74 yards, 2:31; Florida Atlantic 35–14)
- (2:30) FAU – Tony Johnson 72 yard pass from Casey Thompson, Logan Lupo kick (Drive: 1 play, 72 yards, 0:12; Florida Atlantic 42–14)

Fourth quarter

- (7:19) MONM – Dre Tucker 16 yard pass from Marquez McCray, kick failed (Drive: 6 plays, 75 yards, 2:10; Florida Atlantic 42–20)

Statistics	Monmouth (FCS)	Florida Atlantic
First downs	19	22
Plays–yards	83–361	59–493
Rushes–yards	36–112	32–213
Passing yards	249	280
Passing: comp–att–int	26–47–1	22–27–1
Time of possession	34:21	25:39

Team	Category	Player	Statistics
Monmouth (FCS)	Passing	Marquez McCray	26/46, 249 yards, 2 TD, 1 INT
Monmouth (FCS)	Rushing	Jaden Shirden	24 carries, 66 yards
Monmouth (FCS)	Receiving	Dymere Miller	10 receptions, 78 yards
Florida Atlantic	Passing	Casey Thompson	20/25, 280 yards, 5 TD, 1 INT
Florida Atlantic	Rushing	Larry McCammon	13 carries, 125 yards, 1 TD
Florida Atlantic	Receiving	Tony Johnson	5 receptions, 91 yards, 2 TD
