= 2023 Maine Black Bears football team =

American college football season

2023 Maine Black Bears football
- Conference: CAA Football Conference
- Record: 2–9 (1–7 CAA)
- Head coach: Jordan Stevens (2nd season)
- Offensive coordinator: Steve Cooper (1st season)
- Defensive coordinator: Jeff Comissiong (1st season)
- Base defense: 4-3
- Home stadium: Alfond Stadium

2023 Coastal Athletic Association Football Conference standings
	Conf.			Overall
Team	W		L	W		L
No. 5 Albany +^	7	–	1	11	–	4
No. 6 Villanova +^	7	–	1	10	–	3
No. 15 Richmond +^	7	–	1	9	–	4
No. 10 Delaware ^	6	–	2	9	–	4
Elon	6	–	2	6	–	5
New Hampshire	4	–	4	6	–	5
Rhode Island	4	–	4	6	–	5
William & Mary	4	–	4	6	–	5
Campbell	4	–	4	5	–	6
Towson	4	–	4	5	–	6
Hampton	3	–	5	5	–	6
Monmouth	3	–	5	4	–	7
Maine	1	–	7	2	–	9
North Carolina A&T	0	–	8	1	–	10
Stony Brook	0	–	8	0	–	10
+ – Conference co-champions; ^ – FCS playoff participant; Rankings from STATS Poll

The 2023 Maine Black Bears football team represented the University of Maine as a member of the Coastal Athletic Association Football Conference (CAA) in the 2023 NCAA Division I FCS football season. The Black Bears were led by second-year head coach Jordan Stevens and played home games at Alfond Stadium in Orono, Maine.

The CAA, formerly known as the Colonial Athletic Association from 2007 through 2022, changed its name in July 2023 to accommodate future membership expansion outside of the Thirteen Colonies.

== Transfers ==
=== Outgoing ===
Over the off-season, Maine lost sixteen players through the transfer portal. Twelve are currently committed while the remainder are still actively pursuing new schools.

Name	Pos.	New school
Elijah Alexander	DE	Unknown
Austin Ambush	S	Jacksonville State
Tyrese Baptiste	WR	Unknown
Navonn Barrett	CB	Lackawanna C.C.
Shawn Bowman	TE	Rutgers
Freddie Brock	RB	Georgia State
Brian Cooey	P	Charleston Southern
Antonio Corsi	TE	St. Francis Xavier
Jamond DuBose	S	The Citadel
Jabari Echols	CB	Merrimack
Charles Eberle	LS/LB	New Mexico State
Joe Fagnano	QB	UConn
Jaylen Long	LB	Monroe J.C.
Khairi Manns	DE	Colorado
Xavier Nurse	LB	Samford
Justin Sambu	DT	Baylor

=== Incoming ===
Over the off-season, Maine added thirteen players through the transfer portal.

Name	Pos.	Class	Previous school
Alex Berrouet	RB	So	Colorado State
Amir Byrd	S	Sr	Rutgers
Aidan Cadogan	P	Jr	New Hampshire
Joe Gillette	WR	Sr	Lafayette
Justyn Haynesworth	DL	Jr	East Carolina
Izaiah Henderson	DL	R-Sr	Boston College
Joe Horn	IOL	So	UMass
Alhaji Kamara	CB	So	Old Dominion
Damon Matthews	S	Sr	Rutgers
Daniel Plascencia	IOL	So	Southwestern College
Brian Santana-Fis	RB	So	El Camino College
Rayshad Wallace	DL	Gr	Sacred Heart
Zachary Zoglio	LS	Jr	Eastern Michigan

== Schedule ==
Date	Time	Opponent	Site	TV	Result	Attendance
September 2	6:30 p.m.	at FIU*	Riccardo Silva Stadium; Miami, FL	ESPN+	L 12–14	16,878
September 9	3:30 p.m.	at No. 2 North Dakota State*	Fargodome; Fargo, ND	ESPN+	L 7–44	15,044
September 16	3:30 p.m.	No. 21 Rhode Island	Alfond Stadium; Orono, ME	FloSports	L 17–34	4,813
September 23	3:30 p.m.	at No. 5 William & Mary	Zable Stadium; Williamsburg, VA	FloSports	L 3–28	7,365
September 30	3:30 p.m.	Stony Brook	Alfond Stadium; Orono, ME	FloSports	W 56–28	5,243
October 7	3:30 p.m.	at Richmond	E. Claiborne Robins Stadium; Richmond, VA	FloSports	L 31–42	6,099
October 14	1:00 p.m.	LIU*^{†}	Alfond Stadium; Orono, ME	FloSports/WFVX	W 24–13	8,588
October 21	4:00 p.m.	at Campbell	Barker-Lane Stadium; Buies Creek, NC	FloSports	L 28–34	5,357
October 28	1:00 p.m.	Albany	Alfond Stadium; Orono, ME	FloSports/WVII	L 21–37	3,932
November 4	1:00 p.m.	Hampton	Alfond Stadium; Orono, ME	WVII/FloSports	L 35–42	3,115
November 18	1:00 p.m.	at New Hampshire	Wildcat Stadium; Durham, NH	FloSports	L 25-44	6,727
*Non-conference game; ^{†}Homecoming; Rankings from STATS Poll released prior to the game; All times are in Eastern time

== Game summaries ==
=== At FIU ===
	1	2	3	4	Total
Black Bears	3	3	6	0	12
Panthers	7	7	0	0	14

Statistics	Maine	FIU
First downs	27	13
Total yards	378	305
Rushing yards	165	13
Passing yards	213	292
Turnovers	1	0
Time of possession	39:05	20:00

Team	Category	Player	Statistics
Maine	Passing	Derek Robertson	21-43, 213 yards
Maine	Rushing	Tristen Kenan	24 rushes, 110 yards, TD
Maine	Receiving	Montigo Moss	3 receptions, 50 yards
FIU	Passing	Keyone Jenkins	15-30, 292 yards, 2 TD, INT
FIU	Rushing	Shomari Lawrence	7 rushes, 26 yards
FIU	Receiving	Kris Mitchell	9 receptions, 201 yards, 2 TD

=== At No. 2 North Dakota State ===
	1	2	3	4	Total
Black Bears	0	0	0	7	7
Bison	6	10	14	14	44

Statistics	Maine	NDSU
First downs	13	25
Total yards	223	456
Rushing yards	106	264
Passing yards	117	192
Turnovers	4	0
Time of possession	25:00	35:00

Team	Category	Player	Statistics
Maine	Passing	Derek Robertson	18-29, 117 yards, 3 INT
Maine	Rushing	Tristen Kenan	14 rushes, 55 yards
Maine	Receiving	Jamie Lamson	6 receptions, 42 yards
NDSU	Passing	Cam Miller	14-19, 152 yards
NDSU	Rushing	Cole Payton	8 rushes, 105 yards, 2 TD
NDSU	Receiving	Zach Mathis	4 receptions, 62 yards

=== Vs No. 21 Rhode Island ===
	1	2	3	4	Total
Rams	3	21	3	7	34
Black Bears	7	10	0	0	17

Statistics	Rhode Island	Maine
First downs	25	17
Total yards	440	271
Rushing yards	206	84
Passing yards	234	187
Turnovers	2	1
Time of possession	32:14	27:46

Team	Category	Player	Statistics
Rhode Island	Passing	Kasim Hill	18-32, 234 yards, 2 TD, INT
Rhode Island	Rushing	Ja'Den McKenzie	17 rushes, 124 yards, TD
Rhode Island	Receiving	Kahtero Summers	6 receptions, 130 yds, 2 TD
Maine	Passing	Derek Robertson	21-31, 187 yards, INT
Maine	Rushing	Tristen Kenan	18 rushes, 84 yards, 2 TD
Maine	Receiving	Joe Gillette	6 receptions, 42 yards

=== At No. 5 William & Mary ===
	1	2	3	4	Total
Black Bears	0	3	0	0	3
No. 5 Tribe	0	7	14	7	28

Statistics	Maine	William & Mary
First downs	7	18
Total yards	138	390
Rushing yards	53	331
Passing yards	85	59
Turnovers	1	1
Time of possession	23:08	36:52

Team	Category	Player	Statistics
Maine	Passing	Derek Robertson	10-22, 85 yards, INT
Maine	Rushing	Tristen Kenan	12 rushes, 30 yards
Maine	Receiving	Rohan Jones	3 receptions, 33 yards
William & Mary	Passing	Darius Wilson	8-13, 59 yards, TD
William & Mary	Rushing	Bronson Yoder	25 rushes, 163 yards, TD
William & Mary	Receiving	JT Mayo	3 receptions, 29 yards, TD

=== Vs Stony Brook ===
	1	2	3	4	Total
Seawolves	0	14	7	7	28
Black Bears	28	14	14	0	56

Statistics	Stony Brook	Maine
First downs	19	25
Total yards	479	512
Rushing yards	131	87
Passing yards	348	425
Turnovers	3	1
Time of possession	29:25	30:35

Team	Category	Player	Statistics
Stony Brook	Passing	Casey Case	22-37, 348 yards, 4 TD, INT
Stony Brook	Rushing	Shakhi Carson	9 rushes, 64 yards
Stony Brook	Receiving	Jayden Cook	7 receptions, 117 yards, 2 TD
Maine	Passing	Derek Robertson	25-30, 394 yards, 5 TD
Maine	Rushing	Trevin Ewing	1 rush, 30 yards, TD
Maine	Receiving	Montigo Moss	5 receptions, 108 yards, 2 TD

=== At Richmond ===
	1	2	3	4	Total
Black Bears	17	7	0	7	31
Spiders	14	21	7	0	42

Statistics	Maine	Richmond
First downs	17	23
Total yards	421	487
Rushing yards	11	96
Passing yards	410	391
Turnovers	2	2
Time of possession	26:14	33:46

Team	Category	Player	Statistics
Maine	Passing	Derek Robertson	18-25, 315 yards, 2 TD, 2 INT
Maine	Rushing	Tristen Kenan	1 rush, 15 yards
Maine	Receiving	Joe Gillette	8 receptions, 169 yards, 3 TD
Richmond	Passing	Camden Coleman	25-36, 365 yards, 6 TD, 2 INT
Richmond	Rushing	Savon Smith	12 rushes, 53 yards
Richmond	Receiving	Nick DeGennaro	8 receptions, 113 yards, 3 TD

=== Vs LIU (Homecoming) ===
	1	2	3	4	Total
Sharks	7	3	3	0	13
Black Bears	7	0	7	10	24

Statistics	Long Island	Maine
First downs	15	21
Total yards	357	339
Rushing yards	164	104
Passing yards	193	235
Turnovers	3	0
Time of possession	24:19	35:41

Team	Category	Player	Statistics
Long Island	Passing	Ethan Greenwood	12-17, 186 yards, TD, INT
Long Island	Rushing	Ethan Greenwood	19 rushes, 100 yards
Long Island	Receiving	Michael Love	3 receptions, 109 yards, TD
Maine	Passing	Derek Robertson	20-32, 235 yards, 3 TD
Maine	Rushing	Tavion Banks	21 rushes, 87 yards
Maine	Receiving	Joe Gillette	8 receptions, 102 yards

=== At Campbell ===
	1	2	3	4	Total
Black Bears	7	0	7	14	28
Fighting Camels	7	21	6	0	34

Statistics	Maine	Campbell
First downs	21	25
Total yards	492	410
Rushing yards	-7	168
Passing yards	499	242
Turnovers	3	1
Time of possession	27:36	32:24

Team	Category	Player	Statistics
Maine	Passing	Derek Robertson	36-52, 503 yards, 4 TD, 2 INT
Maine	Rushing	Tavion Banks	4 rushes, 6 yards
Maine	Receiving	Joe Gillette	6 receptions, 135 yards
Campbell	Passing	Hajj-Malik Williams	26-33, 242 yards, 2 TD
Campbell	Rushing	Lamagea McDowell	26 rushes, 114 yards, 2 TD
Campbell	Receiving	VJ Wilkins	8 receptions, 79 yards

=== Vs Albany ===
	1	2	3	4	Total
Great Danes	10	14	13	0	37
Black Bears	7	7	0	7	21

Statistics	Albany	Maine
First downs	21	21
Total yards	473	312
Rushing yards	149	92
Passing yards	324	220
Turnovers	0	3
Time of possession	29:07	30:53

Team	Category	Player	Statistics
Albany	Passing	Reese Poffenbarger	18-30, 324 yards, 2 TD
Albany	Rushing	Faysal Aden	22 rushes, 142 yards, 2 TD
Albany	Receiving	MarQeese Dietz	7 receptions, 150 yards
Maine	Passing	Derek Robertson	29-43, 220 yards, 3 TD, 2 INT
Maine	Rushing	Brian Santana-Fis	3 rushes, 35 yards
Maine	Receiving	Michael Monios	10 receptions, 96 yards, TD

=== Vs Hampton ===
	1	2	3	4	Total
Pirates	7	7	14	14	42
Black Bears	7	21	7	0	35

Statistics	Hampton	Maine
First downs	14	30
Total yards	409	526
Rushing yards	323	151
Passing yards	86	375
Turnovers	0	3
Time of possession	22:53	37:07

Team	Category	Player	Statistics
Hampton	Passing	Christopher Zellous	7-16, 86 yards, TD
Hampton	Rushing	Elijah Burris	14 rushes, 177 yards, 4 TD
Hampton	Receiving	Romon Copeland	3 receptions, 60 yards, TD
Maine	Passing	Derek Robertson	28-46, 349 yards, 5 TD, INT
Maine	Rushing	Tristen Kenan	16 rushes, 88 yards
Maine	Receiving	Jamie Lamson	8 receptions, 180 yards, TD

=== At New Hampshire ===
	1	2	3	4	Total
Black Bears	0	17	0	8	25
Wildcats	13	21	7	3	44

Statistics	Maine	New Hampshire
First downs	22	20
Total yards	346	373
Rushing yards	31	102
Passing yards	315	271
Turnovers	2	0
Time of possession	33:10	26:50

Team	Category	Player	Statistics
Maine	Passing	Derek Robertson	32-51, 315 yards, 3 TD, INT
Maine	Rushing	Tristen Kenan	11 rushes, 50 yards
Maine	Receiving	Trevin Ewing	7 receptions, 79 yards, TD
New Hampshire	Passing	Max Brosmer	16-26, 271 yards, 3 TD
New Hampshire	Rushing	Myles Thomason	16 rushes, 60 yards
New Hampshire	Receiving	Logan Tomlinson	8 receptions, 121 yards, TD

== Roster ==
2023 Maine Black Bears football team roster
Players
Coaches
Offense

Pos.	#	Name	Class
WR	2	Trevin Ewing	So
QB	10	Caden Drezek	Fr
QB	11	Ayden Pereira	Fr
WR	12	Braeden Heald	GS
QB	13	Derek Robertson	Sr
QB	14	Anthony Harris	Sr
WR	15	Zaheem Crawford-Patterson	Fr
TE	16	Eli Mahan	So
QB	17	Keegan Andrews	Fr
WR	18	Joe Gillette	GS
QB	19	Jack Kelley	Sr
RB	19	Brian Santana-Fis	So
WR	20	Nick Laughlin	Fr
RB	22	Tristen Kenan	Fr
RB	25	Tavion Banks	Sr
RB	28	Evan Wallace	Fr
RB	32	Alex Berrouet	So
RB	35	Stone Compton	So
RB	36	Symon Sathler	Fr
WR	41	Aaron Arteaga	Fr
RB	46	John Gay	GS
TE	48	Declan McKevitt	So
TE	49	Elijah Smalls	Fr
OL	55	Darius Bell	So
OL	57	David Gross	So
OL	62	Pius Ejindu	Fr
OL	63	Jack Webb	GS
OL	64	Jack Boutaugh	Fr
OL	65	Nicolas Cruji	Fr
OL	67	Jaykob Dow	Fr
OL	68	Max Gregor	Fr
OL	70	Joe Horn	So
OL	71	Daniel Plascencia	So
OL	72	Tyler Williams	Fr
OL	73	Nicholas Kaptein	Fr
OL	74	Anthony Iliano	Fr
OL	75	Sean Pozniak	Fr
OL	76	Xavier Lozowicki	Fr
OL	77	Kevin Jones	GS
OL	78	Jack Lillie	Fr
OL	79	Max Lövblad	GS
WR	80	Jamie Lamson	Sr
WR	81	Montigo Moss	Jr
TE	82	Cooper Heisey	Sr
WR	83	Michael Monios	Jr
WR	84	Kevin Jackson	Fr
WR	85	Blake Thomas	Fr
TE	86	Jake Kucera	Fr
TE	87	Francisco Pratts	Fr
TE	88	Rohan Jones	So
WR	89	Gianni Rossitto	So

Defense

Pos.	#	Name	Class
LB	0	Vince Thomas	Jr
CB	1	Kahzir Brown	Jr
S	3	Shakur Smalls	Jr
DT	5	Josh Lezin	GS
LB	6	Darius McKenzie	So
LB	7	Latrell Couchman	So
S	8	Robby Riobe	Sr
LB	11	Christian Thomas	Jr
CB	13	Dede Doegan	So
S	20	Jylun Spence	So
LB	21	Jayden Platt	Fr
S	21	Amir Byrd	Sr
CB	23	Alhaji Kamara	So
CB	24	Aaron Gethers	GS
DB	25	Sheaquan Walters	Fr
S	26	Damon Matthews	GS
CB	27	Jamaree Gibson	Fr
CB	29	Nassir Young	So
CB	30	Na'Cire Christmas	Fr
LB	31	Terrence Ganyi	GS
LB	33	Jabari Odoemenem	Fr
CB	34	Daren Omoregie	Fr
LB	35	Devin Hairston	Fr
CB	37	Devin Vaught	Fr
S	38	Sherrod Hudson	Fr
S	39	Amari Mack	Fr
LB	40	Tyshawn Stewart	So
S	42	Abdul Stewart	Jr
LB	43	BJ Mayes	Fr
DT	44	Rayshad Wallace	GS
DL	45	Ta'Kai Chisolm	Fr
DL	47	Jared Tynes	Fr
DB	48	Nic Swanson	Fr
DT	52	John Costanza	Jr
LB	53	Isaac Ofielu	So
LB	54	Zion Cheeks	Fr
DE	56	Jacob Tuiasosopo	Sr
DT	58	Jaxon Gross	Fr
DE	90	Xavier Holmes	So
DT	91	Shymell Davis	So
DL	92	Izaiah Henderson	Sr
DT	93	Kye Pressley	Fr
DE	94	Chris Bacon	Fr
DT	95	Mike Hamilton	Fr
DT	96	Dorian Royal	Jr
DT	97	Justyn Haynesworth	Jr
DE	99	Nicolas Kalume	Fr

Special teams

Pos.	#	Name	Class
P	14	Aidan Cadogan	Jr
K	45	Joey Bryson	Fr
K/P	50	Michael Lewinski	Fr
P	58	Charles Rulon	Sr
K	59	Cody Williams	GS
LS	81	Zach Zoglio	Jr
LS	94	Clayton Ritter	So
P	95	Bailey Timms	GS

Head coach

- Jordan Stevens (Maine)

Coordinators/assistant coaches

- Steve Cooper (Portland State)
  Offensive coordinator/Quarterbacks
- Jeff Comissiong (Maine)
  Defensive coordinator/Linebackers
- Mikahael Waters (Nevada)
  Wide Receivers/Special Teams Coord./Pro Liaison
- Pushaun Brown (Maine)
  Running backs
- Tom McEntire (Thiel)
  Defensive Pass Game Coordinator/Defensive Backs
- Spencer Carey (Maine)
  Outside Linebackers/Recruiting Coordinator
- Umberto di Meo (Springfield)
  Defensive Line
- Dave Bucar (Washington & Jefferson)
  Offensive Line
- John Gardner (Washington)
  Tight Ends
- Mike DeVito (Maine)
  Director of Player Development & Alumni Relations
- Justin Karriem (Towson)
  Cornerbacks
- Thomas Hanscom (Maine)
  Director of Football Operations
- Trey Hall (Edinboro)
  Head Football Sports Performance Coach
- Jessica Bishop
  Athletic Academic Counselor – Tutor/Mentor Coordinator
- Kristin Gilmour
  Athletic Academic Counselor
- Muralee Das
  Faculty Liaison

Legend

- (C) Team captain
- (S) Suspended
- (I) Ineligible
- Injured
- Redshirt

Roster
Last update: September 17, 2023
