= 2023 Stony Brook Seawolves football team =

American college football season

2023 Stony Brook Seawolves football
- Conference: CAA Football
- Record: 0–10 (0–8 CAA)
- Head coach: Chuck Priore (18th season)
- Co-offensive coordinator: Chris Bache (9th season)
- Defensive coordinator: Matt Hachmann (1st season)
- Home stadium: Kenneth P. LaValle Stadium

2023 Coastal Athletic Association Football Conference standings
	Conf.			Overall
Team	W		L	W		L
No. 5 Albany +^	7	–	1	11	–	4
No. 6 Villanova +^	7	–	1	10	–	3
No. 15 Richmond +^	7	–	1	9	–	4
No. 10 Delaware ^	6	–	2	9	–	4
Elon	6	–	2	6	–	5
New Hampshire	4	–	4	6	–	5
Rhode Island	4	–	4	6	–	5
William & Mary	4	–	4	6	–	5
Campbell	4	–	4	5	–	6
Towson	4	–	4	5	–	6
Hampton	3	–	5	5	–	6
Monmouth	3	–	5	4	–	7
Maine	1	–	7	2	–	9
North Carolina A&T	0	–	8	1	–	10
Stony Brook	0	–	8	0	–	10
+ – Conference co-champions; ^ – FCS playoff participant; Rankings from STATS Poll

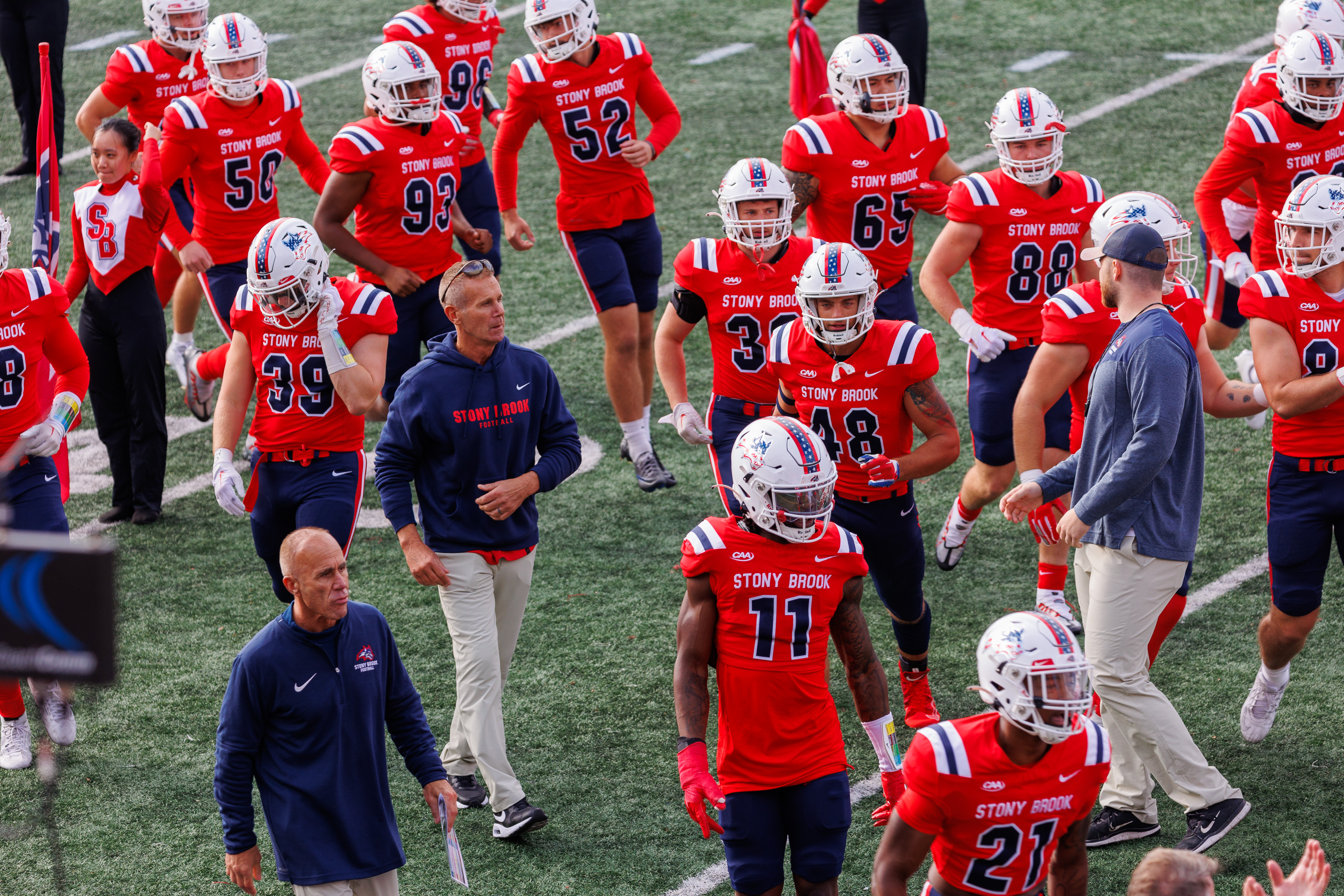
2023 players

The 2023 Stony Brook Seawolves football team represented Stony Brook University as a member of the Coastal Athletic Association Football Conference (CAA Football) during the 2023 NCAA Division I FCS football season. Led by 18th-year head coach Chuck Priore the Seawolves compiled an overall record of 0–10 with a mark of 0–8 in conference play, placing last out of 15 teams in the CAA. Stony Brook played home games at Kenneth P. LaValle Stadium in Stony Brook, New York.

Prior to the season, the Colonial Athletic Association rebranded to the Coastal Athletic Association to reflect both the expansion and modernization of the league.

Coming off a program-worst 2–9 season, Stony Brook completed a winless season for the first time in 2023 to set a new program low, having lost 19 of its last 21 games.

Defensive coordinator Bryan Collins died before the season started on July 8, 2023 from a sudden cardiac event. Matt Hachmann was promoted to defensive coordinator in the wake of Collins' death.

Stony Brook's game against Morgan State on October 7 was canceled three days prior to the contest because of a mass shooting that occurred on the Morgan State campus. There was an active manhunt on campus for an at-large shooter, who was not arrested until October 12.

After an 0–10 season, the first winless season in Stony Brook history, Priore was fired two days after the team's last game, on November 13. He finished with a record of 97–101 over 18 years as Stony Brook's head coach.

== Schedule ==
Date	Time	Opponent	Site	TV	Result	Attendance	Source
August 31	7:00 p.m.	No. 22 Delaware	Kenneth P. LaValle Stadium; Stony Brook, NY	FloSports	L 13–37	11,132	
September 8	7:00 p.m.	at No. 22 Rhode Island	Meade Stadium; Kingston, RI	FloSports	L 14–35	N/A	
September 16	6:00 p.m.	at Arkansas State*	Centennial Bank Stadium; Jonesboro, AR	ESPN+	L 7–31	14,327	
September 23	3:30 p.m.	Richmond	Kenneth P. LaValle Stadium; Stony Brook, NY	FloSports	L 19–20	3,678	
September 30	3:30 p.m.	at Maine	Alfond Stadium; Orono, ME	FloSports	L 28–56	5,243	
October 7	1:00 p.m.	at Morgan State*	Hughes Stadium; Baltimore, MD	ESPN+	Canceled		
October 14	3:30 p.m.	Fordham*	Kenneth P. LaValle Stadium; Stony Brook, NY	FloSports	L 7–26	4,165	
October 21	3:30 p.m.	New Hampshire^{†}	Kenneth P. LaValle Stadium; Stony Brook, NY	FloSports	L 14–45	7,739	
October 28	2:00 p.m.	at No. 19 Villanova	Villanova Stadium; Villanova, PA	FloSports	L 13–48	5,119	
November 4	1:00 p.m.	at Monmouth	Kessler Field; West Long Branch, NJ	FloSports	L 17–56	3,876	
November 11	1:00 p.m.	No. 18 Albany	Kenneth P. LaValle Stadium; Stony Brook, NY (rivalry)	FloSports	L 20–38	5,671	
*Non-conference game; ^{†}Homecoming; Rankings from STATS Poll released prior to the game; All times are in Eastern time
