= 2023 Campbell Fighting Camels football team =

American college football season

2023 Campbell Fighting Camels football
- Conference: CAA Football Conference
- Record: 5–6 (4–4 CAA)
- Head coach: Mike Minter (11th season)
- Offensive coordinator: Anthony Weeden (2nd season)
- Co-defensive coordinator: Damien Adams (2nd season)
- Home stadium: Barker–Lane Stadium

2023 Coastal Athletic Association Football Conference standings
	Conf.			Overall
Team	W		L	W		L
No. 5 Albany +^	7	–	1	11	–	4
No. 6 Villanova +^	7	–	1	10	–	3
No. 15 Richmond +^	7	–	1	9	–	4
No. 10 Delaware ^	6	–	2	9	–	4
Elon	6	–	2	6	–	5
New Hampshire	4	–	4	6	–	5
Rhode Island	4	–	4	6	–	5
William & Mary	4	–	4	6	–	5
Campbell	4	–	4	5	–	6
Towson	4	–	4	5	–	6
Hampton	3	–	5	5	–	6
Monmouth	3	–	5	4	–	7
Maine	1	–	7	2	–	9
North Carolina A&T	0	–	8	1	–	10
Stony Brook	0	–	8	0	–	10
+ – Conference co-champions; ^ – FCS playoff participant; Rankings from STATS Poll

The 2023 Campbell Fighting Camels football team represented Campbell University as a member of Coastal Athletic Association Football Conference (CAA) during the 2023 NCAA Division I FCS football season. Campbell, previously a member of the Big South Conference, left that conference to join the CAA after spending 2022 in the Big South Conference. Led by tenth-year head coach Mike Minter, the Fighting Camels played their home games at the Barker–Lane Stadium in Buies Creek, North Carolina.

The CAA, formerly known as the Colonial Athletic Association from 2007 through 2022, changed its name in July 2023 to accommodate future membership expansion outside of the Thirteen Colonies.

== Schedule ==
Date	Time	Opponent	Site	TV	Result	Attendance
August 31	7:00 p.m.	No. 4 William & Mary	Barker–Lane Stadium; Buies Creek, NC	FloSports	L 24–34	4,167
September 9	3:00 p.m.	at The Citadel*	Johnson Hagood Stadium; Charleston, SC	ESPN+	W 56–7	9,327
September 16	1:00 p.m.	at Monmouth	Kessler Field; West Long Branch, NJ	FloSports	W 45–31	2,643
September 23	6:00 p.m.	Elon	Barker-Lane Stadium; Buies Creek, NC	FloSports	L 24–28	3,344
September 30	4:00 p.m.	at No. 15 North Carolina Central*	O'Kelly–Riddick Stadium; Durham, NC	ESPN+	L 48–49 ^{OT}	8,410
October 7	2:00 p.m.	at Hampton	Armstrong Stadium; Hampton, VA	FloSports	W 30–27	3,968
October 21	4:00 p.m.	Maine^{†}	Barker-Lane Stadium; Buies Creek, NC	FloSports	W 34–28	5,357
October 28	3:30 p.m.	at Richmond	E. Claiborne Robins Stadium; Richmond, VA	FloSports	L 13–44	5,611
November 4	12:00 pm	at North Carolina*	Kenan Memorial Stadium; Chapel Hill, NC	ACCN	L 7–59	47,667
November 11	1:00 p.m.	No. 8 Delaware	Barker-Lane Stadium; Buies Creek, NC	FloSports	L 7–45	3,786
November 18	1:00 p.m.	at North Carolina A&T	Truist Stadium; Greensboro, NC	FloSports	W 28–14	0
*Non-conference game; ^{†}Homecoming; Rankings from STATS Poll released prior to the game; All times are in Eastern time
