= 2023 Towson Tigers football team =

American college football season

2023 Towson Tigers football
- Conference: CAA Football Conference
- Record: 5–6 (4–4 CAA)
- Head coach: Pete Shinnick (1st season)
- Offensive coordinator: Brian Sheppard (1st season)
- Defensive coordinator: Darian Dulin (1st season)
- Home stadium: Johnny Unitas Stadium

2023 Coastal Athletic Association Football Conference standings
	Conf.			Overall
Team	W		L	W		L
No. 5 Albany +^	7	–	1	11	–	4
No. 6 Villanova +^	7	–	1	10	–	3
No. 15 Richmond +^	7	–	1	9	–	4
No. 10 Delaware ^	6	–	2	9	–	4
Elon	6	–	2	6	–	5
New Hampshire	4	–	4	6	–	5
Rhode Island	4	–	4	6	–	5
William & Mary	4	–	4	6	–	5
Campbell	4	–	4	5	–	6
Towson	4	–	4	5	–	6
Hampton	3	–	5	5	–	6
Monmouth	3	–	5	4	–	7
Maine	1	–	7	2	–	9
North Carolina A&T	0	–	8	1	–	10
Stony Brook	0	–	8	0	–	10
+ – Conference co-champions; ^ – FCS playoff participant; Rankings from STATS Poll

The 2023 Towson Tigers football team represented Towson University as a member of the Coastal Athletic Association Football Conference (CAA) during the 2023 NCAA Division I FCS football season. They were led by first-year head coach Pete Shinnick and played home games at Johnny Unitas Stadium in Towson, Maryland.

The CAA, formerly known as the Colonial Athletic Association from 2007 through 2022, changed its name in July 2023 to accommodate future membership expansion outside of the Thirteen Colonies.

== Schedule ==
Date	Time	Opponent	Site	TV	Result	Attendance
September 2	3:30 p.m.	at Maryland*	SECU Stadium; College Park, MD	BTN	L 6–38	37,241
September 9	6:00 p.m.	Monmouth	Johnny Unitas Stadium; Towson, MD	FloSports	L 23-42	3,442
September 16	6:00 p.m.	at Morgan State*	Hughes Stadium; Baltimore, MD	ESPN+	W 20–10	N/A
September 23	4:00 p.m.	Norfolk State*	Johnny Unitas Stadium; Towson, MD	FloSports	L 14–21	2,606
September 30	3:00 p.m.	at No. 14 New Hampshire	Wildcat Stadium; Durham, NH	FloSports	W 54–51 ^{OT}	13,544
October 7	4:00 p.m.	Albany^{†}	Johnny Unitas Stadium; Towson, MD	FloSports	L 17–24	4,789
October 21	3:30 p.m.	at No. 13 William & Mary	Zable Stadium; Williamsburg, VA	FloSports	W 34–24	13,713
October 28	4:00 p.m.	No. 5 Delaware	Johnny Unitas Stadium; Towson, MD	FloSports	L 13–51	4,238
November 4	1:00 p.m.	at North Carolina A&T	Truist Stadium; Greensboro, NC	FloSports	W 42–32	21,500
November 11	1:00 p.m.	at No. 13 Villanova	Villanova Stadium; Villanova, PA	FloSports	L 10–33	4,819
November 18	1:00 p.m.	Rhode Island	Johnny Unitas Stadium; Towson, MD	FloSports	W 31–30	3,840
*Non-conference game; ^{†}Homecoming; Rankings from STATS Poll released prior to the game; All times are in Eastern time

== Game summaries ==
=== at Maryland ===
Towson Tigers (FCS) (0-0) at Maryland Terrapins (0-0) – Game summary

Quarter	1	2	3	4	Total
Tigers (FCS)	0	3	3	0	6
Terrapins	21	7	7	3	38

at SECU Stadium • College Park, Maryland

- Date: September 2
- Game time: 3:30 p.m. EDT/12:30 p.m. PDT
- Game attendance: 37,241
- Referee: Tim O'Dey
- TV announcers (BTN): Joe Beninati (play-by-play), Anthony Herron (analyst), and Justine Ward (sideline)

Game information

First quarter

- 12:06 MD - Taulia Tagovailoa 23-yard run (Jack Howes kick) - 7-0 Maryland, Drive: 7 plays, 87 yards, 2:54
- 4:29 MD - Corey Dyches 23-yard pass from Taulia Tagovailoa (Jack Howes kick) - 14-0 Maryland, Drive: 5 plays, 54 yards, 2:38
- 0:17 MD - Jeshaun Jones 24-yard pass from Taulia Tagovailoa (Jack Howes kick) - 21-0 Maryland, Drive: 7 plays, 52 yards, 2:43

Second quarter

- 11:57 TOW - Keegan Vaughan 36-yard field goal - 21-3 Maryland, Drive: 9 plays, 57 yards, 3:20
- 0:14 MD - Kaden Prather 13-yard pass from Taulia Tagovailoa (Jack Howes kick) - 28-3 Maryland, Drive: 15 plays, 91 yards, 3:47

Third quarter

- 9:26 MD - Roman Hemby 9-yard run (Jack Howes kick) - 35-3 Maryland, Drive: 8 plays, 72 yards, 4:08
- 1:33 TOW - Keegan Vaughan 38-yard field goal - 35-6 Maryland, Drive: 16 plays, 53 yards, 7:53

Fourth quarter

- 5:38 MD - Evan Johnson 24-yard field goal - 38-6 Maryland, Drive: 17 plays, 62 yards, 7:23

Statistics	Towson (FCS)	Maryland
First downs	16	30
Plays–yards	65-276	79-449
Rushes–yards	34-148	36-166
Passing yards	128	283
Passing: comp–att–int	16-31-0	26-43-0
Time of possession	26:52	33:08

Team	Category	Player	Statistics
Towson (FCS)	Passing	Nathan Kent	16/31, 128 yards
Towson (FCS)	Rushing	Devin Matthews	12 carries, 48 yards
Towson (FCS)	Receiving	Da'Kendall James	4 receptions, 49 yards
Maryland	Passing	Taulia Tagovailoa	22/33, 260 yards, 3 TDs
Maryland	Rushing	Roman Hemby	12 carries, 58 yards, 1 TD
Maryland	Receiving	Corey Dyches	6 receptions, 108 yards, 1 TD
