= 2023 Elon Phoenix football team =

American college football season

2023 Elon Phoenix football
- Conference: CAA Football Conference
- Record: 6–5 (6–2 CAA)
- Head coach: Tony Trisciani (5th season)
- Offensive coordinator: Drew Folmar (7th season)
- Defensive coordinator: Dovonte Edwards (2nd season)
- Home stadium: Rhodes Stadium

2023 Coastal Athletic Association Football Conference standings
	Conf.			Overall
Team	W		L	W		L
No. 5 Albany +^	7	–	1	11	–	4
No. 6 Villanova +^	7	–	1	10	–	3
No. 15 Richmond +^	7	–	1	9	–	4
No. 10 Delaware ^	6	–	2	9	–	4
Elon	6	–	2	6	–	5
New Hampshire	4	–	4	6	–	5
Rhode Island	4	–	4	6	–	5
William & Mary	4	–	4	6	–	5
Campbell	4	–	4	5	–	6
Towson	4	–	4	5	–	6
Hampton	3	–	5	5	–	6
Monmouth	3	–	5	4	–	7
Maine	1	–	7	2	–	9
North Carolina A&T	0	–	8	1	–	10
Stony Brook	0	–	8	0	–	10
+ – Conference co-champions; ^ – FCS playoff participant; Rankings from STATS Poll

The 2023 Elon Phoenix football team represented Elon University as a member of the Coastal Athletic Association Football Conference (CAA) during the 2023 NCAA Division I FCS football season. The Phoenix were led by fifth-year head coach Tony Trisciani and played home games at Rhodes Stadium in Elon, North Carolina.

The CAA, formerly known as the Colonial Athletic Association from 2007 through 2022, changed its name in July 2023 to accommodate future membership expansion outside of the Thirteen Colonies.

== Schedule ==
Date	Time	Opponent	Rank	Site	TV	Result	Attendance
August 31	7:00 p.m.	at Wake Forest*		Allegacy Federal Credit Union Stadium; Winston-Salem, NC	ACCN	L 17–37	30,028
September 9	6:00 p.m.	at Gardner–Webb*		Ernest W. Spangler Stadium; Boiling Springs, NC	ESPN+	L 27–34	5,078
September 16	6:00 p.m.	North Carolina A&T		Rhodes Stadium; Elon, NC	FloSports	W 27–3	11,257
September 23	6:00 p.m.	at Campbell		Barker-Lane Stadium; Buies Creek, NC	FloSports	W 28–24	3,344
September 30	2:00 p.m.	No. 5 William & Mary		Rhodes Stadium; Elon, NC	FloSports	W 14–6	12,705
October 7	2:00 p.m.	No. 14 North Carolina Central*	No. 25	Rhodes Stadium; Elon, NC	FloSports	L 23–34	5,563
October 14	1:00 p.m.	at Villanova		Villanova Stadium; Villanova, PA	FloSports	L 0–21	2,429
October 21	2:00 p.m.	Monmouth^{†}		Rhodes Stadium; Elon, NC	FloSports	W 28–26	5,891
November 4	1:00 p.m.	at No. 5 Delaware		Delaware Stadium; Newark, DE	FloSports	W 33–27	16,722
November 11	2:00 p.m.	at Richmond		E. Claiborne Robins Stadium; Richmond, VA	FloSports	L 24–38	6,539
November 18	1:00 p.m.	Hampton		Rhodes Stadium; Elon, NC	FloSports	W 51–14	4,625
*Non-conference game; ^{†}Homecoming; Rankings from STATS Poll released prior to the game; All times are in Eastern time

== Game summaries ==
=== at Wake Forest ===
Elon Phoenix (0–0) at Wake Forest Demon Deacons (0–0)

Quarter	1	2	3	4	Total
Phoenix	0	0	14	3	17
Demon Deacons	10	14	6	7	37

at Truist Field, Winston-Salem, NC

- Date: August 31, 2023
- Game time: 7:00 p.m. EST
- Game attendance: 30,028
- TV announcers (ACCN): Drew Carter, Dustin Fox

Game information

First quarter
Second quarter
Third quarter
Fourth quarter

Win probability

Line

Over/under

Statistics	ELON	WAKE
First downs	13	22
Total yards	251	427
Rushing yards	104	98
Passing yards	149	327
Turnovers	2	1
Time of possession	31:50	28:10

Team	Category	Player	Statistics
Elon	Passing	Justin Allen	18/29, 130 yards, 2 INT
Elon	Rushing	Jalen Hampton	15 carries, 89 yards, 1 TD
Elon	Receiving	Jordan Bonner	7 catches, 58 yards
Wake Forest	Passing	Mitch Griffis	19/30, 329, 3 TD, 1 INT
Wake Forest	Rushing	Demond Claiborne	13 carries, 70 yards, 1 TD
Wake Forest	Receiving	Jahmal Banks	6 catches, 108 yards, 1 TD
