= 2023 New Hampshire Wildcats football team =

American college football season

2023 New Hampshire Wildcats football
- Conference: CAA Football Conference
- Record: 6–5 (4–4 CAA)
- Head coach: Ricky Santos (3rd season)
- Offensive coordinator: Brian Scott (2nd season)
- Defensive coordinator: Garrett Gillick (2nd season)
- Home stadium: Wildcat Stadium

2023 Coastal Athletic Association Football Conference standings
	Conf.			Overall
Team	W		L	W		L
No. 5 Albany +^	7	–	1	11	–	4
No. 6 Villanova +^	7	–	1	10	–	3
No. 15 Richmond +^	7	–	1	9	–	4
No. 10 Delaware ^	6	–	2	9	–	4
Elon	6	–	2	6	–	5
New Hampshire	4	–	4	6	–	5
Rhode Island	4	–	4	6	–	5
William & Mary	4	–	4	6	–	5
Campbell	4	–	4	5	–	6
Towson	4	–	4	5	–	6
Hampton	3	–	5	5	–	6
Monmouth	3	–	5	4	–	7
Maine	1	–	7	2	–	9
North Carolina A&T	0	–	8	1	–	10
Stony Brook	0	–	8	0	–	10
+ – Conference co-champions; ^ – FCS playoff participant; Rankings from STATS Poll

The 2023 New Hampshire Wildcats football team represented the University of New Hampshire as a member of the Coastal Athletic Association Football Conference (CAA) in the 2023 NCAA Division I FCS football season. The Wildcats were led by third-year head coach Ricky Santos, (Note: Santos also served as interim-head coach for the 2019 season.) and played their home games at Wildcat Stadium in Durham, New Hampshire.

The CAA, formerly known as the Colonial Athletic Association from 2007 through 2022, changed its name in July 2023 to accommodate future membership expansion outside of the Thirteen Colonies.

== Schedule ==
Date	Time	Opponent	Rank	Site	TV	Result	Attendance
September 2	1:00 p.m.	at Stonehill*	No. 11	W.B. Mason Stadium; Easton, MA	NEC Front Row	W 51–17	2,400
September 9	1:30 p.m.	at Central Michigan*	No. 11	Kelly/Shorts Stadium; Mount Pleasant, MI	ESPN+	L 42–45	17,302
September 16	6:00 p.m.	Dartmouth*	No. 11	Wildcat Stadium; Durham, NH (rivalry)	FloSports	W 24–7	8,330
September 23	6:00 p.m.	at No. 19 Delaware	No. 11	Delaware Stadium; Newark, DE	FloSports	L 25–29	10,618
September 30	3:00 p.m.	Towson	No. 14	Wildcat Stadium; Durham, NH	FloSports	L 51–54 ^{OT}	13,544
October 14	1:00 p.m.	No. 24 Albany^{†}		Wildcat Stadium; Durham, NH	FloSports	W 38–31	8,346
October 21	3:30 p.m.	at Stony Brook		Kenneth P. LaValle Stadium; Stony Brook, NY	FloSports	W 45–14	7,739
October 28	1:00 p.m.	at Rhode Island		Meade Stadium; Kingston, RI	FloSports	L 28–34 ^{OT}	5,162
November 4	1:00 p.m.	No. 17 Villanova		Wildcat Stadium; Durham, NH	FloSports	L 33–45	6,633
November 11	12:00 p.m.	at Monmouth		Kessler Field; West Long Branch, NJ	FloSports	W 31–24	2,596
November 18	1:00 p.m.	Maine		Wildcat Stadium; Durham, NH	FloSports	W 44–25	6,727
*Non-conference game; ^{†}Homecoming; Rankings from STATS Poll released prior to the game; All times are in Eastern time

== Players drafted into the NFL ==
Round	Pick	Player	Position	NFL club
6	208	Dylan Laube	RB	Las Vegas Raiders
