= Dymere Miller =

American gridiron football player (born 2001)

- Miller with the Toronto Argonauts in 2026

No. 0 – Toronto Argonauts
- Position: Wide receiver
- Roster status: Reserve
- CFL status: American

Personal information
- Born: May 30, 2001 (age 25); Coatesville, Pennsylvania, U.S.
- Listed height: 5 ft 11 in (1.80 m)
- Listed weight: 184 lb (83 kg)

Career information
- High school: Coatesville Area (Coatesville); Salisbury (Salisbury, Connecticut)
- College: Monmouth (2020–2023); Rutgers (2024)
- NFL draft: 2025: undrafted

Career history
- New York Jets (2025)*; Toronto Argonauts (2026–present)
- * Offseason or practice squad member only

Awards and highlights
- First-team FCS All-America (2023); First-team All-CAA (2023); Second-team All-CAA (2022)
- Stats at Pro Football Reference
- Stats at CFL.ca

Dymere Miller (born May 30, 2001) is an American professional football wide receiver for the Toronto Argonauts of the Canadian Football League (CFL). He played college football for the Monmouth Hawks and Rutgers Scarlet Knights.

== Early life ==
Miller was born on May 30, 2001, in Coatesville, Pennsylvania. He attended Coatesville Area High School in Coatesville and finished his high school career at the Salisbury School in Salisbury, Connecticut. In addition to football, Miller ran track helped set Pennsylvania's 4 x 100 relay record.

== College career ==
Miller played college football for the Monmouth Hawks from 2020 to 2023 and Rutgers Scarlet Knights in 2024. He had 168 receptions for 2,387 yards and 17 touchdowns in 34 games for Monmouth. Miller was twice named to the all-conference team, second-team in 2022 and first-team in 2023. He also made the first-team FCS All-America team.

On December 17, 2023, Miller transferred to Rutgers for his final year of eligibility. In 13 games, he had 59 catches for 757 yards and for touchdowns.

== Professional career ==
Pre-draft measurables
Height	Weight	Arm length	Hand span	Wingspan	40-yard dash	10-yard split	20-yard split	20-yard shuttle	Three-cone drill	Vertical jump	Broad jump	Bench press
5 ft 11 in (1.80 m)	181 lb (82 kg)	32 in (0.81 m)	8 5/8 in (0.22 m)	6 ft 4 1/2 in (1.94 m)	4.39 s	1.44 s	2.54 s	4.25 s	6.76 s	34.5 in (0.88 m)	10 ft 4 in (3.15 m)	18 reps
All values from Pro day

=== New York Jets ===
After not being selected in the 2025 NFL draft, Miller signed with the New York Jets of the National Football League (NFL) as an undrafted free agent. On August 23, he was released by the team.

=== Toronto Argonauts ===
On February 18, 2026, the Toronto Argonauts of the Canadian Football League (CFL) signed Miller. On June 11, he was placed on the reserve roster. On June 25, Miller was signed to the practice roster. He was promoted to the active roster on July 17, and made his first game appearance as the team's return specialist. In his debut, Miller returned four kickoffs for 159 yards and four punts for 34 yards. On July 24, he was placed on the six-game injured list.
