= 2023 North Carolina A&T Aggies football team =

American college football season

2023 North Carolina A&T Aggies football
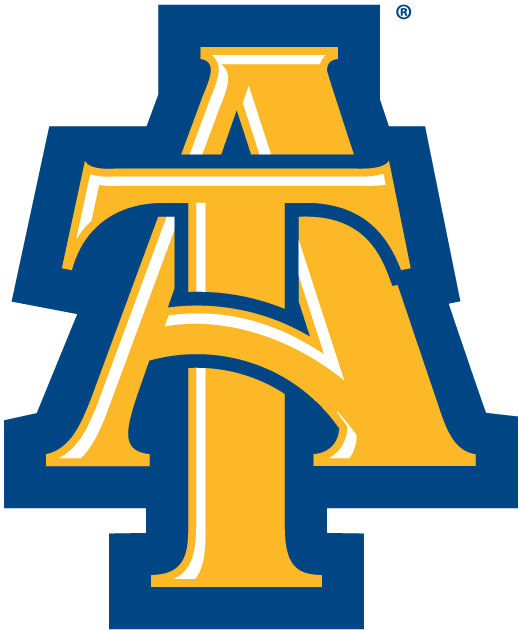
- Conference: CAA Football
- Record: 1–10 (0–8 CAA)
- Head coach: Vincent Brown (1st season)
- Offensive coordinator: Chris Young (1st season)
- Defensive coordinator: Josh Zidenberg (1st season)
- Home stadium: Truist Stadium

2023 Coastal Athletic Association Football Conference standings
	Conf.			Overall
Team	W		L	W		L
No. 5 Albany +^	7	–	1	11	–	4
No. 6 Villanova +^	7	–	1	10	–	3
No. 15 Richmond +^	7	–	1	9	–	4
No. 10 Delaware ^	6	–	2	9	–	4
Elon	6	–	2	6	–	5
New Hampshire	4	–	4	6	–	5
Rhode Island	4	–	4	6	–	5
William & Mary	4	–	4	6	–	5
Campbell	4	–	4	5	–	6
Towson	4	–	4	5	–	6
Hampton	3	–	5	5	–	6
Monmouth	3	–	5	4	–	7
Maine	1	–	7	2	–	9
North Carolina A&T	0	–	8	1	–	10
Stony Brook	0	–	8	0	–	10
+ – Conference co-champions; ^ – FCS playoff participant; Rankings from STATS Poll

The 2023 North Carolina A&T Aggies football team represented North Carolina A&T State University as a member of CAA Football (in full, the Coastal Athletic Association Football Conference) during the 2023 NCAA Division I FCS football season. The Aggies, led by first-year head coach Vincent Brown, played their inaugural season as members of CAA Football. (Note: North Carolina A&T joined the multi-sports Coastal Athletic Association in 2022.) Their home games were played at Truist Stadium in Greensboro, NC

The CAA, formerly known as the Colonial Athletic Association from 2007 through 2022, changed its name in July 2023 to accommodate future membership expansion outside of the Thirteen Colonies. This name change also applied to CAA Football, which is a legally separate entity administered by the multi-sports CAA.

== Schedule ==
Date	Time	Opponent	Site	TV	Result	Attendance
August 31	8:00 p.m	at UAB*	Protective Stadium; Birmingham, AL	ESPN+	L 6–35	25,363
September 9	7:00 p.m.	No. 18 North Carolina Central*	Truist Stadium; Greensboro, NC (rivalry)	FloSports	L 16–30	N/A
September 16	6:00 p.m.	at Elon	Rhodes Stadium; Elon, NC	FloSports	L 3–27	11,257
September 30	2:00 p.m.	at Norfolk State*	Dick Price Stadium; Norfolk, VA	ESPN+	W 28–26	12,894
October 7	4:00 p.m.	Villanova	Truist Stadium; Greensboro, NC	FloSports	L 14–37	8,098
October 14	3:00 p.m.	at No. 8 Delaware	Delaware Stadium; Newark, DE	FloSports	L 6–21	13,041
October 21	1:00 p.m.	Richmond	Truist Stadium; Greensboro, NC	FloSports	L 10–33	21,500
October 28	1:00 p.m.	at Hampton	Armstrong Stadium; Hampton, VA	FloSports	L 24–26	13,811
November 4	1:00 p.m.	Towson^{†}	Truist Stadium; Greensboro, NC	FloSports	L 32–42	21,500
November 11	1:00 p.m.	at Rhode Island	Meade Stadium; Kingston, RI	FloSports	L 24–31	4,022
November 18	1:00 p.m.	Campbell	Truist Stadium; Greensboro, NC	FloSports	L 14–28	0
*Non-conference game; ^{†}Homecoming; Rankings from STATS Poll released prior to the game; All times are in Eastern time
