= Nate Lynn =

American football player (born 2002)

No. 92 – New York Jets
- Position: Linebacker
- Roster status: Active

Personal information
- Born: July 6, 2002 (age 24)
- Listed height: 6 ft 3 in (1.91 m)
- Listed weight: 256 lb (116 kg)

Career information
- High school: Homewood-Flossmoor (Flossmoor, Illinois); Zebulon B. Vance (Charlotte, North Carolina)
- College: William & Mary (2019–2023)
- NFL draft: 2024: undrafted

Career history
- Detroit Lions (2024); Tennessee Titans (2025)*; New York Jets (2026–present)
- * Offseason or practice squad member only
- Stats at Pro Football Reference

Nate Lynn (born July 6, 2002) is an American professional football linebacker for the New York Jets of the National Football League (NFL). He played college football for the William & Mary Tribe and was signed by the Detroit Lions as an undrafted free agent in 2024.

== Early life ==
Lynn was born on July 6, 2002. He grew up playing football and sometimes played against players several years older than him as he was "always big for his age". At age 11, he told his mother that he thought he "might not be tough enough to push back effectively against the older boys". In response, his mother had him push her in a desk chair across a 25-yard distance repeatedly, and the next day, Lynn "pushed those people around like they were nothing".

Lynn attended Homewood-Flossmoor High School but saw limited playing time and was ranked as a zero-star recruit. He transferred to Zebulon B. Vance High School in North Carolina as a senior and was named all-conference after posting 61 tackles, 21 tackles-for-loss (TFLs) and 14 sacks while helping Vance to the state championship game. He was invited to the Blue–Grey All-American Bowl after the season. Lynn committed to play college football for the William & Mary Tribe at the NCAA Division I FCS level, one of only three teams to give him an offer.

== College career ==
As a freshman at William & Mary in 2019, Lynn played in all 12 games and made 14 tackles and 1.5 TFLs. In the spring 2021 season, he played in three games and made seven tackles, a TFL and a pass breakup. He had a breakout year as a redshirt-sophomore in the fall 2021 season, posting 52 tackles, 13.5 TFLs, 12 sacks and six forced fumbles. He was named a first-team FCS All-American, first-team All-Colonial Athletic Association (CAA) and ranked ninth in voting for the Buck Buchanan Award for his performance. The following year, Lynn was named first-team All-CAA and third-team All-American after tallying 61 tackles, 13 TFLs, eight sacks and four forced fumbles. In his last year, he served as team captain and made 58 tackles, 11 TFLs and eight sacks, being named first-team All-CAA, second-team All-American and a finalist for the Buck Buchanan Award. He concluded his collegiate career having made a school-record 12 forced fumbles, also placing second in team history with 28 sacks.

== Professional career ==
Pre-draft measurables
Height	Weight	Arm length	Hand span	Wingspan	40-yard dash	10-yard split	20-yard split	20-yard shuttle	Three-cone drill	Vertical jump	Broad jump	Bench press
6 ft 2 3/4 in (1.90 m)	253 lb (115 kg)	31 in (0.79 m)	9 3/8 in (0.24 m)	6 ft 4 1/8 in (1.93 m)	4.85 s	1.65 s	2.86 s	4.62 s	7.43 s	30.5 in (0.77 m)	9 ft 6 in (2.90 m)	20 reps
All values from Pro Day

=== Detroit Lions ===
After going unselected in the 2024 NFL draft, Lynn signed with the Detroit Lions as an undrafted free agent. He impressed in training camp and in the first preseason game but suffered a torn ligament in his shoulder, resulting in him spending the entire 2024 season on injured reserve.

On August 26, 2025, Lynn was waived by the Lions as part of final roster cuts.

=== Tennessee Titans ===
On November 10, 2025, Lynn was signed to the Tennessee Titans' practice squad. He signed a reserve/future contract with Tennessee on January 5, 2026. On April 30, Lynn was waived by the Titans.

=== New York Jets ===
On August 18, 2026, Lynn signed with the New York Jets. Lynn was waived by the Jets as a part of final roster cuts on August 30; he was re-signed to the team's practice squad the following day. On October 7, Lynn was signed to the active roster.
