= AJ Simon =

American football player (1998–2024)

No. 8
- Position: Defensive end

Personal information
- Born: December 2, 1998; Oceanside, New York, U.S.
- Died: April 17, 2024 (aged 25)
- Listed height: 6 ft 1 in (1.85 m)
- Listed weight: 267 lb (121 kg)

Career information
- High school: Pocono Mountain West (Pocono Summit, Pennsylvania)
- College: Bloomsburg (2018–2021); Albany (2022–2023)

Awards and highlights
- First-team FCS All-American (2023)
- Stats at ESPN

Amitral "AJ" Simon Jr. (December 2, 1998 – April 17, 2024) was an American college football defensive end who played for the Bloomsburg Huskies and Albany Great Danes.

== Early life ==
Coming out of high school in 2018, Simon decided to commit to play college football for the Bloomsburg Huskies.

== College career ==
During Simon's career at Bloomsburg, he notched 80 tackles with 20 being for a loss, 11.5 sacks, two pass deflections, and three forced fumbles.

For the 2022 season, Simon transferred to play for the Albany Great Danes. In his first season with the Great Danes, he tallied five sacks. In 2023, Simon totaled 55 tackles and 12.5 sacks. He was named first-team all-CAA and a FCS All-American. After the season, Simon declared for the 2024 NFL draft.

== Death ==
On April 17, 2024, just a week before the 2024 NFL draft, Simon was pronounced dead at the age of 25 due to sudden cardiac death.

== See also ==
- List of gridiron football players who died during their careers
