= 2023 Richmond Spiders football team =

American college football season

2023 Richmond Spiders football

CAA co-champion

NCAA Division I Second Round, L 13–41 at Albany
- Conference: CAA Football Conference

Ranking
- STATS: No. 15
- FCS Coaches: No. 22
- Record: 9–4 (7–1 CAA)
- Head coach: Russ Huesman (7th season)
- Offensive coordinator: Adam Ross & Winston October (1st season)
- Defensive coordinator: Justin Wood (4th season)
- Home stadium: E. Claiborne Robins Stadium

2023 Coastal Athletic Association Football Conference standings
	Conf.			Overall
Team	W		L	W		L
No. 5 Albany +^	7	–	1	11	–	4
No. 6 Villanova +^	7	–	1	10	–	3
No. 15 Richmond +^	7	–	1	9	–	4
No. 10 Delaware ^	6	–	2	9	–	4
Elon	6	–	2	6	–	5
New Hampshire	4	–	4	6	–	5
Rhode Island	4	–	4	6	–	5
William & Mary	4	–	4	6	–	5
Campbell	4	–	4	5	–	6
Towson	4	–	4	5	–	6
Hampton	3	–	5	5	–	6
Monmouth	3	–	5	4	–	7
Maine	1	–	7	2	–	9
North Carolina A&T	0	–	8	1	–	10
Stony Brook	0	–	8	0	–	10
+ – Conference co-champions; ^ – FCS playoff participant; Rankings from STATS Poll

The 2023 Richmond Spiders football team represented the University of Richmond as a member of Coastal Athletic Association Football Conference (CAA) in the 2023 NCAA Division I FCS football season. The Spiders were led by seventh-year head coach Russ Huesman and played their home games at E. Claiborne Robins Stadium in Richmond, Virginia.

The CAA, formerly known as the Colonial Athletic Association from 2007 through 2022, changed its name in July 2023 to accommodate future membership expansion outside of the Thirteen Colonies.

== Preseason ==
=== CAA poll ===
In the CAA preseason poll released on July 25, 2023, the Spiders were predicted to finish in third place out of 15 teams following the addition of Campbell and North Carolina A&T for the 2023 season.

Predicted finish	Team	Votes (1st place)
1	William & Mary	195 (13)
2	New Hampshire	195 (1)
3	Richmond	159
4	Delaware	149 (1)
5	Elon	146
6	Rhode Island	135
7	Villanova	129
8	Monmouth	94
9	Towson	85
10	North Carolina A&T	70
11	Albany	64
12	Campbell	62
13	Maine	40
14	Stony Brook	38
15	Hampton	30

== Schedule ==
Date	Time	Opponent	Rank	Site	TV	Result	Attendance
September 2	6:00 p.m.	Morgan State*	No. 18	E. Claiborne Robins Stadium; Richmond, VA	FloSports	L 10–17	6,603
September 9	3:30 p.m.	at Michigan State*		Spartan Stadium; East Lansing, MI	BTN	L 14–45	70,049
September 16	3:30 p.m.	Delaware State*		E. Claiborne Robins Stadium; Richmond, VA	FloSports	W 38–6	4,936
September 23	3:30 p.m.	at Stony Brook		Kenneth P. LaValle Stadium; Stony Brook, NY	FloSports	W 20–19	3,678
September 30	2:00 p.m.	Hampton		E. Claiborne Robins Stadium; Richmond, VA	FloSports	L 14–31	7,203
October 7	3:30 p.m.	Maine		E. Claiborne Robins Stadium; Richmond, VA	FloSports	W 42–31	6,099
October 14	1:00 p.m.	at Rhode Island		Meade Stadium; Kingston, RI	FloSports	W 24–17	5,363
October 21	1:00 p.m.	at North Carolina A&T		Truist Stadium; Greensboro, NC	FloSports	W 33–10	8,035
October 28	3:30 p.m.	Campbell^{†}		E. Claiborne Robins Stadium; Richmond, VA	FloSports	W 44–13	5,611
November 11	2:00 p.m.	Elon		E. Claiborne Robins Stadium; Richmond, VA	FloSports	W 38–24	6,539
November 18	1:00 p.m.	at William & Mary		Zable Stadium; Williamsburg, VA (Capital Cup)	FloSports	W 27–26	10,345
November 25	2:00 p.m.	No. 16 North Carolina Central*	No. 22	E. Claiborne Robins Stadium; Richmond, VA (NCAA Division I First Round)	ESPN+	W 49–27	4,103
December 2	12:00 p.m.	at No. 9 Albany*	No. 22	Bob Ford Field at Tom & Mary Casey Stadium; Albany, NY (NCAA Division I Second Round)	ESPN+	L 13–41	2,652
*Non-conference game; ^{†}Homecoming; Rankings from STATS Poll released prior to the game; All times are in Eastern time

== Ranking movements ==
Ranking movements Legend: ██ Increase in ranking ██ Decrease in ranking — = Not ranked RV = Received votes
	Week													
Poll	Pre	1	2	3	4	5	6	7	8	9	10	11	12	Final
STATS FCS	18	RV	—	—	—	—	—	—	—	RV	RV	RV	22	15
Coaches	16	RV	RV	RV	RV	—	—	—	—	—	—	RV	25	22
