= 2020–21 Colonial Athletic Association football season =

2020–21 CAA football season
- League: NCAA Division I Football Championship
- Sport: Football
- Duration: February 20, 2021 – April 17, 2021
- Teams: 11

CAA football seasons
- ← 2019 2021 →

2020 Colonial Athletic Association football standings
	Conf.			Overall
Team	W		L	W		L
North Division
No. 4 Delaware x$^	4	–	0	7	–	1
No. 18 Rhode Island †	2	–	1	2	–	1
No. 16 Villanova	2	–	2	2	–	2
Maine	2	–	2	2	–	2
Stony Brook	1	–	3	1	–	3
Albany †	1	–	3	1	–	3
New Hampshire †	0	–	1	0	–	1
South Division
No. 3 James Madison x^	3	–	0	7	–	1
No. 15 Richmond	3	–	1	3	–	1
William & Mary	1	–	2	1	–	2
Elon	0	–	4	1	–	5
$ – Conference champion; x – Division champion/co-champions; ^ – FCS playoff participant; Notes: Due to COVID-19, the CAA suspended the fall 2020 football season. Towson opted out of the spring football season. † – Albany, New Hampshire, and Rhode Island opted out of the remainder of the spring season on March 31, April 6, and April 7 respectively.; Rankings from STATS Poll

The 2020–21 Colonial Athletic Association football season was the fourteenth season of football for the Colonial Athletic Association (CAA) and part of the 2020–21 NCAA Division I FCS football season. The entirety of the season was completed in the spring due to the COVID-19 pandemic in the United States, and Towson opted to not participate in the season. Albany opted out on March 31 after playing 4 games, with New Hampshire following on April 6 and Rhode Island opting out the next day.

== Head coaches ==
Team	Coach	Season	Overall Record	Record at School	CAA Record
Albany	Greg Gattuso	7th	130–69 (.653)	33–37 (.471)	18–30 (.375)
Delaware	Danny Rocco	4th	109–57 (.657)	19–16 (.543)	39–26 (.600)
Elon	Tony Trisciani	2nd	5–6 (.455)	5–6 (.455)	4–4 (.500)
James Madison	Curt Cignetti	2nd	81–28 (.743)	14–2 (.875)	18–5 (.783)
Maine	Nick Charlton	2nd	6–6 (.500)	6–6 (.500)	4–4 (.500)
New Hampshire	Sean McDonnell	21st	154–95 (.618)	154–95 (.618)	98–65 (.601)
Rhode Island	Jim Fleming	7th	36–54 (.400)	15–53 (.221)	9–39 (.188)
Richmond	Russ Huesman	4th	74–56 (.569)	15–19 (.441)	10–14 (.417)
Stony Brook	Chuck Priore	15th	128–82 (.610)	89–74 (.546)	28–28 (.500)
Villanova	Mark Ferrante	4th	19–16 (.543)	19–16 (.543)	10–14 (.417)
William & Mary	Mike London	2nd	67–68 (.496)	5–7 (.417)	16–8 (.667)

== Regular season ==
Index to colors and formatting
CAA member won
CAA member lost
CAA teams in **bold**

All times Eastern time.

Weeks labeled by the associated Saturday.

Rankings reflect that of the STATS FCS poll for that week.

=== February 20 ===
Date	Time	Visiting team	Home team	Site	Result	Attendance	Reference
February 20	noon	Morehead State	**James Madison**	Bridgeforth Stadium • Harrisonburg, VA	**W** 52–0	250	
February 20	1:30 p.m.	Davidson	**Elon**	Rhodes Stadium • Elon, NC	**W** 26–23	980	

=== February 27 ===
Date	Time	Visiting team	Home team	Site	Result	Attendance	Reference
February 27	noon	Robert Morris	**James Madison**	Bridgeforth Stadium • Harrisonburg, VA	**W** 36–16	250	
February 27	3:00 p.m.	**Elon**	Gardner–Webb	Ernest W. Spangler Stadium • Boiling Springs, NC	**L** 20–42	2,700	
~~February 27~~	~~TBD~~	~~**Rhode Island**~~	~~Bryant~~	~~Beirne Stadium • Smithfield, RI~~	**Canceled**		

=== March 6 ===
Date	Time	Visiting team	Home team	Site	Result	Attendance	Reference
March 5	7:00 p.m.	**Albany**	**New Hampshire**	Wildcat Stadium • Durham, NH	**ALB** 24–20	0	
March 6	noon	**Maine**	**Delaware**	Delaware Stadium • Newark, DE	**DEL** 37–0	0	
March 6	noon	**Villanova**	**Stony Brook**	Kenneth P. LaValle Stadium • Stony Brook, NY	**VILL** 16–13	0	
March 6	1:00 p.m.	**William & Mary**	**Richmond**	E. Claiborne Robins Stadium • Richmond, VA	**RICH** 21–14	1,000	
March 6	1:300 p.m.	**James Madison**	**Elon**	Rhodes Stadium • Elon, NC	**JMU** 20–17	1,147	

Players of the week:

Offensive		Defensive		Rookie		Special teams	
Player	Team	Player	Team	Player	Team	Player	Team

=== March 13 ===
Date	Time	Visiting team	Home team	Site	Result	Attendance	Reference
March 13	noon	**Albany**	**Maine**	Alfond Stadium • Orono, ME	**MAINE** 38–34	0	
March 13	noon	**Stony Brook**	**Delaware**	Delaware Stadium • Newark, DE	**DEL** 31–3	1,800	
March 13	1:00 p.m.	**Richmond**	**Elon**	Rhodes Stadium • Elon, NC	**RICH** 38–14	1,137	
March 13	1:30 p.m.	**Rhode Island**	**Villanova**	Villanova Stadium • Villanova, PA	**URI** 40–37^{OT}	193	
~~March 13~~	~~4:00 p.m.~~	~~**William & Mary**~~	~~**James Madison**~~	~~Bridgeforth Stadium • Harrisonburg, VA~~	**Canceled**		

Players of the week:

Offensive		Defensive		Rookie		Special teams	
Player	Team	Player	Team	Player	Team	Player	Team

=== March 20 ===
Date	Time	Visiting team	Home team	Site	Result	Attendance	Reference
~~March 20~~	~~noon~~	~~**Delaware**~~	~~**New Hampshire**~~	~~Wildcat Stadium • Durham, NH~~	**Canceled**		
March 20	noon	**Maine**	**Stony Brook**	Kenneth P. LaValle Stadium • Stony Brook, NY	**MAINE** 35–19	0	
March 20	1:00 p.m.	**Rhode Island**	**Albany**	Bob Ford Field • Albany, NY	**URI** 17–10^{OT}	0	
March 20	4:00 p.m.	**Elon**	**William & Mary**	Zable Stadium • Williamsburg, VA	**W&M** 31–10	0	
~~March 20~~	~~4:00 p.m.~~	~~**Richmond**~~	~~**James Madison**~~	~~Bridgeforth Stadium • Harrisonburg, VA~~	**Canceled**		

Players of the week:

Offensive		Defensive		Rookie		Special teams	
Player	Team	Player	Team	Player	Team	Player	Team

=== March 27 ===
Date	Time	Visiting team	Home team	Site	Result	Attendance	Reference
March 27	noon	**Delaware**	**Rhode Island**	Meade Stadium • Kingston, RI	**DEL** 35–21	500	
March 27	1:00 p.m.	**James Madison**	**William & Mary**	Zable Stadium • Williamsburg, VA	**JMU** 38–10	1,000	
March 27	1:00 p.m.	**Stony Brook**	**Albany**	Bob Ford Field • Albany, NY	**SBU** 21–7	0	
~~March 27~~	~~1:00 p.m.~~	~~**New Hampshire**~~	~~**Villanova**~~	~~Villanova Stadium • Villanova, PA~~	**Canceled**		
March 27	4:00 p.m.	**Elon**	**Richmond**	E. Claiborne Robins Stadium • Richmond, VA	**RICH** 31–17	1,000	

Players of the week:

Offensive		Defensive		Rookie		Special teams	
Player	Team	Player	Team	Player	Team	Player	Team

=== April 3 ===
Date	Time	Visiting team	Home team	Site	Result	Attendance	Reference
April 3	noon	**Villanova**	**Maine**	Alfond Stadium • Orono, ME	**VILL** 44–17		
~~April 3~~	~~noon~~	~~**James Madison**~~	~~**Richmond**~~	~~E. Claiborne Robins Stadium • Richmond, VA~~	**Canceled**		
~~April 3~~	~~noon~~	~~**Albany**~~	~~**Delaware**~~	~~Delaware Stadium • Newark, DE~~	**Canceled**		
~~April 3~~	~~1:00 p.m.~~	~~**New Hampshire**~~	~~**Rhode Island**~~	~~Meade Stadium • Kingston, RI~~	**Canceled**		
~~April 3~~	~~4:00 p.m.~~	~~**William & Mary**~~	~~**Elon**~~	~~Rhodes Stadium • Elon, NC~~	**Canceled**		

Players of the week:

Offensive		Defensive		Rookie		Special teams	
Player	Team	Player	Team	Player	Team	Player	Team

=== April 10 ===
Date	Time	Visiting team	Home team	Site	Result	Attendance	Reference
~~April 10~~	~~noon~~	~~**Stony Brook**~~	~~**New Hampshire**~~	~~Wildcat Stadium • Durham, NH~~	**Canceled**		
~~April 10~~	~~noon~~	~~**Maine**~~	~~**Rhode Island**~~	~~Meade Stadium • Kingston, RI~~	**Canceled**		
~~April 10~~	~~1:00 p.m.~~	~~**Villanova**~~	~~**Albany**~~	~~Bob Ford Field • Albany, NY~~	**Canceled**		
~~April 10~~	~~1:00 p.m.~~	~~**Richmond**~~	~~**William & Mary**~~	~~Zable Stadium • Williamsburg, VA~~	**Canceled**		
~~April 10~~	~~4:00 p.m.~~	~~**Elon**~~	~~**James Madison**~~	~~Bridgeforth Stadium • Harrisonburg, VA~~	**Canceled**		
April 10	6:00 p.m.	**Delaware**	Delaware State	Alumni Stadium • Dover, DE			

Players of the week:

Offensive		Defensive		Rookie		Special teams	
Player	Team	Player	Team	Player	Team	Player	Team

=== April 17 ===
Date	Time	Visiting team	Home team	Site	Result	Attendance	Reference
~~April 17~~	~~noon~~	~~**Rhode Island**~~	~~**Stony Brook**~~	~~Kenneth P. LaValle Stadium • Stony Brook, NY~~			
April 17	1:00 p.m.	**Delaware**	**Villanova**	Villanova Stadium • Villanova, PA			
~~April 17~~	~~2:00 p.m.~~	~~**New Hampshire**~~	~~**Maine**~~	~~Alfond Stadium • Orono, ME~~			
April 17	2:00 p.m.	**Richmond**	**James Madison**	Bridgeforth Stadium • Harrisonburg, VA			

Players of the week:

Offensive		Defensive		Rookie		Special teams	
Player	Team	Player	Team	Player	Team	Player	Team

== FCS playoffs ==
Date	Time	Visiting team	Home team	Round	Site	TV	Result	Attendance	Reference
April 24		VMI	James Madison	First Round	Bridgeforth Stadium • Harrisonburg, VA	ESPN3			
April 24		Sacred Heart	Delaware	First Round	Delaware Stadium • Newark, DE	ESPN3			
