= 2023 Coastal Athletic Association Football Conference season =

- League: NCAA Division I Football Championship Subdivision
- Sport: football
- Duration: August 26, 2023; November 18, 2023
- Teams: 15
- TV partner(s): FloSports, ESPN+

2024 NFL draft

Seasons
- 2022 2024

2023 Coastal Athletic Association Football Conference standings
	Conf.			Overall
Team	W		L	W		L
No. 5 Albany +^	7	–	1	11	–	4
No. 6 Villanova +^	7	–	1	10	–	3
No. 15 Richmond +^	7	–	1	9	–	4
No. 10 Delaware ^	6	–	2	9	–	4
Elon	6	–	2	6	–	5
New Hampshire	4	–	4	6	–	5
Rhode Island	4	–	4	6	–	5
William & Mary	4	–	4	6	–	5
Campbell	4	–	4	5	–	6
Towson	4	–	4	5	–	6
Hampton	3	–	5	5	–	6
Monmouth	3	–	5	4	–	7
Maine	1	–	7	2	–	9
North Carolina A&T	0	–	8	1	–	10
Stony Brook	0	–	8	0	–	10
+ – Conference co-champions; ^ – FCS playoff participant; Rankings from STATS Poll

The 2023 Coastal Athletic Association Football Conference season is the 17th season of the Coastal Athletic Association Football Conference, branded as CAA Football, taking place during the 2023 NCAA Division I FCS football season. The season began on August 26, 2023 with non-conference play; conference play will begin on September 23, 2023.

While this season is the first for the conference's full name of Coastal Athletic Association Football Conference, with the first word having been "Colonial" from 2007 through 2022, the brand name of CAA Football has been used since the multi-sports Coastal Athletic Association took over operation of the former Atlantic 10 football conference in 2007.

== Background ==
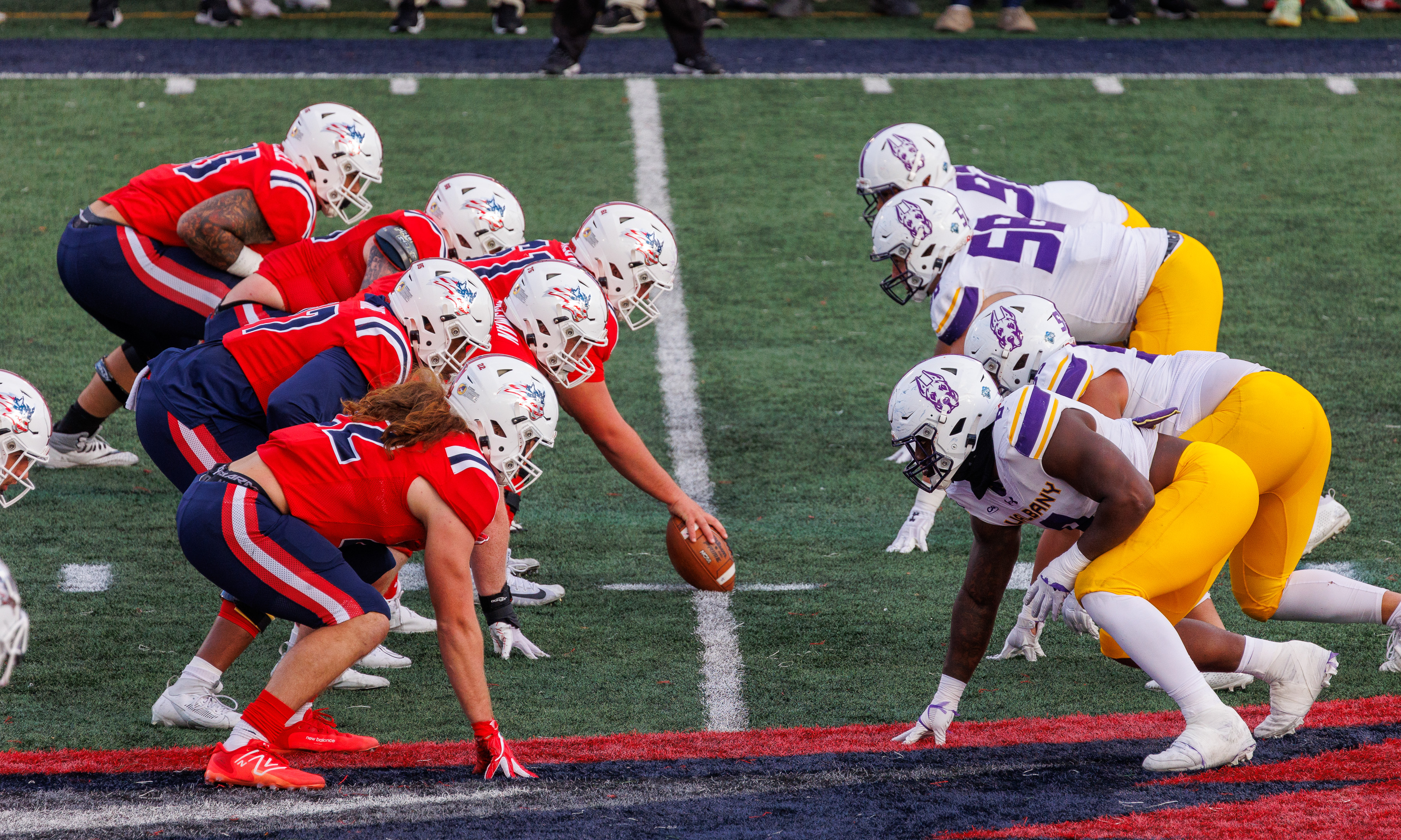
The top ranked Albany Great Danes beat bottom ranked Stony Brook, 38-20

Campbell and North Carolina A&T joined CAA Football from the Big South Conference. Campbell also joined the multi-sports CAA at that time, while A&T had joined the multi-sports CAA in 2022.

== Preseason ==
=== Recruiting classes ===
National Rankings
Team	Total Signees
Albany	11
Campbell	17
Delaware	28
Elon	13
Hampton	13
Maine	25
Monmouth	21
New Hampshire	n/a
North Carolina A&T	n/a
Rhode Island	17
Richmond	15
Stony Brook	20
Towson	18
Villanova	11
William & Mary	13

=== CAA media day ===
The 2023 CAA media day was held on July 25, 2023. The teams and representatives in respective order were as follows:

- CAA Commissioner – Joe D'Antonio
- Albany – Greg Gattuso (HC) / Reese Poffenbarger (QB) / Larry Walker Jr. (DB)
- Campbell – Mike Minter (HC) / CJ Tillman (LB) / Hajj-Malik Williams (QB)
- Delaware – Ryan Carty (HC) / Chase McGowan (DL) / Jourdan Townsend (WR)
- Elon – Tony Trisciani (HC) / Bo Sanders (DB) / Jabril Williams (OL)
- Hampton – Robert Prunty (HC) / Romon Copeland (WR) / Qwahsin Townsel (LB)
- Maine – Jordan Stevens (HC) / Derek Robertson (QB) / Vince Thomas (LB)
- Monmouth – Kevin Callahan (HC) / Eddie Morales III (DB) / Jaden Shirden (RB)
- New Hampshire – Rick Santos (HC) / Max Brosmer (QB) / Max Oxendine (S)
- North Carolina A&T – Vincent Brown (HC) / Cesar Minarro (C) / Karon Prunty (CB)
- Rhode Island – Jim Fleming (HC) / Kasim Hill (QB) / Evan Stewart (LB)
- Richmond – Russ Huesman (HC) / Ryan Coll (OL) / Tristan Wheeler (LB)
- Stony Brook – Chuck Priore (HC) / Taylor Bolesta (LB) / RJ Lamarre (WR)
- Towson – Pete Shinnick (HC) / Jesus Gibbs (DL) / D’Ago Hunter (RB/PR/KR)
- Villanova – Mark Ferrante (HC) / Jalen Goodman (DB) / Jaaron Hayek (WR)
- William & Mary – Mike London (HC) / Nate Lynn (DL) / Bronson Yoder (RB)

=== Preseason poll ===
The preseason poll was released on July 25, 2023.

CAA
Predicted finish	Team	Votes (1st place)
1	William & Mary	195 (13)
2	New Hampshire	195 (1)
3	Richmond	159
4	Delaware	149 (1)
5	Elon	146
6	Rhode Island	135
7	Villanova	129
8	Monmouth	94
9	Towson	85
10	North Carolina A&T	70
11	Albany	64
12	Campbell	62
13	Maine	40
14	Stony Brook	38
15	Hampton	30

- First place votes in ()

==== Preseason All-CAA teams ====
2023 Preseason All-CAA

- Offensive Player of the Year: Jaden Shirden, RB, Monmouth, Jr.
- Defensive Player of the Year: John Pius, DL, William & Mary, Jr.

All-CAA Offense
Position	Player	Class	Team
QB	Max Brosmer	Junior	New Hampshire
RB	Dylan Laube	Senior	New Hampshire
RB	Jaden Shirden	Junior	Monmouth
FB	Johncarlos Miller III	Senior	Elon
TE	Kyle Lepkowski	Senior	New Hampshire
WR	Jaaron Hayek	Graduate	Villanova
WR	Dymere Miller	Senior	Monmouth
WR	Jourdan Townsend	Graduate	Delaware
OL	Ryan Coll	Senior	Richmond
OL	Michael Corbi	Graduate	Villanova
OL	Nick Correia	Senior	Rhode Island
OL	Mike Edwards	Graduate	Campbell
OL	Charles Grant	Junior	William & Mary
OL	Tairiq Stewart	Graduate	North Carolina A&T
PK	Alex Schmoke	Graduate	Delaware
KR	D'Ago Hunter	Graduate	Towson
PR	Dylan Laube	Senior	New Hampshire

All-CAA Defense
Position	Player	Class	Team
DL	Marlem Louis	Senior	Richmond
DL	Nate Lynn	Senior	William & Mary
DL	Dylan Ruiz	Junior	New Hampshire
DL	Josiah Silver	Junior	New Hampshire
LB	Isaiah Jones	Senior	William & Mary
LB	John Pius	Junior	William & Mary
LB	Qwahsin Townsel	Graduate	Hampton
LB	Tristan Wheeler	Senior	Richmond
CB	Jalen Jones	Sophomore	William & Mary
CB	Karon Prunty	Junior	North Carolina A&T
CB	Ryan Poole	Senior	William & Mary
S	Aaron Banks	Graduate	Richmond
S	Bo Sanders	Senior	Elon
P	Ryan Kost	Graduate	Delaware
SPEC	Chandler Brayboy	Junior	Elon

All-CAA Honorable Mention
Position	Player	Team
QB	Kasim Hill	Rhode Island
QB	Reese Poffenbarger	Albany
QB	Darius Wilson	William & Mary
RB	Jalen Hampton	Elon
TE	Braden Brose	Delaware
WR	Joey Corcoran	New Hampshire
WR	Kahtero Summers	Rhode Island
OL	Greg Anderson	Monmouth
OL	Fintan Brose	Delaware
OL	Lorenzo Thompson	Rhode Island
OL	Jabril Williams	Elon
DL	Jesus Gibbs	Towson
DL	Jeremiah Grant	Richmond
DL	Anton Juncaj	Albany
LB	Evan Stewart	Rhode Island
LB	CJ Tillman	Campbell
CB	Kahzir Brown	Maine
CB	Robert Javier	Towson
CB	Mike Reid	Monmouth
S	Jalen Goodman	Villanova
S	Bryson Parker	Richmond
PK	Caleb Dowden	Campbell
PK	Matt Mercurio	Villanova
P	Will Whitehurst	William & Mary
KR	Taymon Cooke	North Carolina A&T

== Head coaches ==
Team	Head coach	Years at school	Overall record	Record at school	CAA record
Albany	Greg Gattuso	10	136–89	39–57	22–46
Campbell	Mike Minter	11	44–60	44–60	0–0
Delaware	Ryan Carty	2	8–5	8–5	4–4
Elon	Tony Trisciani	5	20–20	20–20	15–13
Hampton	Robert Prunty	6	21–23	21–23	1–7
Maine	Jordan Stevens	2	2–9	2–9	2–6
Monmouth	Kevin Callahan	31	178–135	178–135	3–5
New Hampshire	Rick Santos	3	15–9	15–9	12–4
North Carolina A&T	Vincent Brown	1	0–0	0–0	0–0
Rhode Island	Jim Fleming	10	52–63	31–62	20–47
Richmond	Russ Huesman	7	92–66	33–29	23–21
Stony Brook	Chuck Priore	18	136–100	97–91	34–42
Towson	Pete Shinnick	1	79–83	76–76	49–55
Villanova	Mark Ferrante	7	37–26	37–26	23–21
William & Mary	Mike London	6	85–77	23–16	15–12

== Schedule ==
Index to colors and formatting
CAA member won
CAA member lost
CAA teams in **bold**

All times EST time.

=== Regular season schedule ===
==== Week One ====
Date	Time	Visiting team	Home team	Site	TV	Result	Attendance	Ref.
August 26	7:00 p.m.	Fordham	**Albany**	Bob Ford Field at Tom & Mary Casey Stadium • Albany, NY	FloSports	**W** 34-13	8,500	
August 31	7:00 p.m.	No. 21 **Rhode Island**	Georgia State	Center Parc Stadium • Atlanta, GA	ESPN+	**L** 35-42	15,546	
August 31	7:00 p.m.	No. 22 **Delaware**	**Stony Brook**	Kenneth P. LaValle Stadium • Stony Brook, NY	FloSports	DEL 37-13	11,132	
August 31	7:00 p.m.	No. 4 **William & Mary**	**Campbell**	Barker–Lane Stadium • Buies Creek, NC	FloSports	W&M 34-24	4,167	
August 31	7:00 p.m.	**Elon**	Wake Forest	Allegacy Federal Credit Union Stadium • Buies Creek, NC	ACC Network	**L** 17-37	30,028	
August 31	8:00 p.m.	**North Carolina A&T**	UAB	Protective Stadium • Birmingham, AL	ESPN+	**L** 6-35	25,363	
September 2	12:00 p.m.	Villanova	Lehigh	Goodman Stadium • Bethlehem, PA	ESPN+	**W** 38-10	4,360	
September 2	1:00 p.m.	No. 11 New Hampshire	Stonehill	W.B. Mason Stadium • Easton, MA	NEC Front Row	**W** 51-17	2,400	
September 2	3:00 p.m.	Grambling State	Hampton	Red Bull Arena • Harrison, NJ (Brick City Classic)	NFLN	**W** 35-31	7,500	
September 2	3:30 p.m.	Towson	Maryland	SECU Stadium • College Park, MD	BTN	**L** 6-38	37,241	
September 2	6:00 p.m.	Monmouth	Florida Atlantic	FAU Stadium • Boca Raton, FL	ESPN+	**L** 20-42	20,893	
September 2	6:00 p.m.	Albany	Marshall	Joan C. Edwards Stadium • Huntington, WV	ESPN+	**L** 17-21	25,101	
September 2	6:00 p.m.	Morgan State	No. 18 Richmond	E. Claiborne Robins Stadium • Richmond, VA	FloSports	**L** 10-17	6,603	
September 2	6:30 p.m.	Maine	FIU	Riccardo Silva Stadium • Miami, FL	ESPN+	**L** 12-14	16,878	
^{#}Rankings from AP Poll released prior to game. All times are in EST.

==== Week Two ====
Date	Time	Visiting team	Home team	Site	TV	Result	Attendance	Ref.
September 8	7:00 p.m.	**Stony Brook**	No. 22 **Rhode Island**	Meade Stadium • University Park, PA	FloSports	**URI** 35–14	N/A	
September 9	12:00 p.m.	No. 19 **Delaware**	No. 7 (FBS) Penn State	Beaver Stadium • University Park, PA	Peacock	**L** 7–63	108,575	
September 9	1:30 p.m.	No. 11 **New Hampshire**	Central Michigan	Kelly/Shorts Stadium • Mount Pleasant, MI	ESPN+	**L** 42–45	17,302	
September 9	3:00 p.m.	**Campbell**	The Citadel	Johnson Hagood Stadium • Charleston, SC	ESPN+	**W** 56–7	9,327	
September 9	3:30 p.m.	**Maine**	No. 2 North Dakota State	Fargodome • Fargo, ND	ESPN+	**L** 7–44	15,044	
September 9	3:30 p.m.	**Richmond**	Michigan State	Spartan Stadium • East Lansing, MI	BTN	**L** 14–45	70,049	
September 9	6:00 p.m.	**Elon**	Gardner–Webb	Ernest W. Spangler Stadium • Boiling Springs, NC	ESPN+	**L** 27–34	5,078	
September 9	6:00 p.m.	Norfolk State	**Hampton**	Armstrong Stadium • Hampton, VA (Battle of the Bay)	FloSports	**W** 23–31	10,021	
September 9	6:00 p.m.	**Monmouth**	**Towson**	Johnny Unitas Stadium • Towson, MD	FloSports	**TOW** 42–23	3,442	
September 9	6:00 p.m.	Colgate	**Villanova**	Villanova Stadium • Villanova, PA	FloSports	**W** 42–19	5,101	
September 9	6:00 p.m.	Wofford	No. 4 **William & Mary**	Zable Stadium • Williamsburg, VA	FloSports	**W** 23–6	8,579	
September 9	7:00 p.m.	No. 18 North Carolina Central	**North Carolina A&T**	Truist Stadium • Greensboro, NC (rivalry)	FloSports	**L** 16–30	N/A	
September 9	12:00 a.m.	**Albany**	Hawaii	Clarence T. C. Ching Athletics Complex • Manoa, HI	SPEC PPV	**L** 20–31	9,485	
^{#}Rankings from AP Poll released prior to game. All times are in EST.

== Head to head matchups ==
Head to head
Team	Albany	Campbell	Delaware	Elon	Hampton	Maine	Monmouth	New Hampshire	North Carolina A&T	Rhode Island	Richmond	Stony Brook	Towson	Villanova	William & Mary
Albany	–	–	–	–	–	–	–	–	–	–	–	–	W 24–17	W 31–10	–
Campbell	–	–	–	L 24–28	–	–	W 45–31	–	–	–	–	–	–	–	L 24–34
Delaware	–	–	–	–	–	–	–	W 29–25	–	–	–	W 37–13	–	–	–
Elon	–	W 28–24	–	–	–	–	–	–	W 27–3	–	–	–	–	–	W 14–6
Hampton	–	L 27–30	–	–	–	–	–	–	–	–	W 31–14	–	–	–	–
Maine	–	–	–	–	–	–	–	–	–	L 17–34	–	W 56–28	–	–	L 3–28
Monmouth	–	L 31–45	–	–	–	–	–	–	–	–	–	W 42–23	–	–	–
New Hampshire	–	–	L 25–29	–	–	–	–	–	–	–	–	–	L 51–54	–	–
North Carolina A&T	–	–	–	L 3–27	–	–	–	–	–	–	–	–	–	L 14–37	–
Rhode Island	–	–	–	–	–	W 34–17	–	–	–	–	–	W 35–14	–	L 9–35	–
Richmond	–	–	–	–	L 14–31	W 42–31	–	–	–	–	–	W 20–19	–	–	–
Stony Brook	–	–	L 13–37	–	–	L 28–56	–	–	–	L 14–35	L 19–20	–	–	–	–
Towson	L 17–24	–	–	–	–	–	L 23–42	W 54–51	–	–	–	–	–	–	–
Villanova	L 10–31	–	–	–	–	–	–	–	–	W 35–9	–	–	–	–	–
William & Mary	–	W 34–24	–	L 6–14	–	W 28–3	–	–	–	–	–	–	–	–	–

Updated with the results of all regular season conference games.

=== CAA vs FBS matchups ===
The Football Bowl Subdivision comprises eleven conferences and four independent programs.

Date	Visitor	Home	Site	Score
August 31	Rhode Island	Georgia State	Center Parc Stadium • Atlanta, GA	35-42
August 31	Elon	Wake Forest	Allegacy Federal Credit Union Stadium • Winston-Salem, NC	17-37
August 31	North Carolina A&T	UAB	Protective Stadium • Birmingham, AL	6-35
September 2	Towson	Maryland	SECU Stadium • College Park, MD	6-38
September 2	Monmouth	Florida Atlantic	FAU Stadium • Boca Raton, FL	20-42
September 2	Maine	FIU	Riccardo Silva Stadium • Miami, FL	12=14
September 2	Albany	Marshall	Joan C. Edwards Stadium • Huntington, WV	17-21
September 9	Delaware	Penn State	Beaver Stadium • University Park, PA	7-63
September 9	New Hampshire	Central Michigan	Kelly/Shorts Stadium • Mount Pleasant, MI	42-45
September 9	Richmond	Michigan State	Spartan Stadium • East Lansing, MI	14-45
September 9	Albany	Hawaii	Clarence T. C. Ching Athletics Complex • Manoa, HI	20-31
September 16	Stony Brook	Arkansas State	Centennial Bank Stadium • Jonesboro, AR	7-31
September 16	Villanova	UCF	FBC Mortgage Stadium • Orlando, FL	14-48
October 7	William & Mary	Virginia	Scott Stadium • Charlottesville, VA	13-27
November 4	Campbell	North Carolina	Kenan Memorial Stadium • Chapel Hill, NC	

== Rankings ==
Legend
	Improvement in ranking
	Drop in ranking
	Not ranked previous week
	No change in ranking from previous week
RV	Received votes but were not ranked in Top 25 of poll
т	Tied with team above or below also with this symbol

		Pre	Wk 1	Wk 2	Wk 3	Wk 4	Wk 5	Wk 6	Wk 7	Wk 8	Wk 9	Wk 10	Wk 11	Wk 12	Final
Albany	STATS		RV	RV	RV	RV	RV	24	RV	RV	23	18	12	9	5
Albany	C						RV	RV	RV	RV	RV	25	23	15	7
Campbell	STATS			RV	RV										
Campbell	C		RV												
Delaware	STATS	22	19	22	19	11	9	8	7	5	5	8	7	11	10
Delaware	C	21	19	19	16	12	10	8	7	6	6	8	6	12	11
Elon	STATS	RV	RV				25	RV				RV			
Elon	C	RV	RV												
Hampton	STATS														
Hampton	C		RV		RV	RV	RV	RV							
Maine	STATS														
Maine	C														
Monmouth	STATS														
Monmouth	C														
New Hampshire	STATS	11	11	11	11	14	RV	RV	RV	RV					
New Hampshire	C	12	11	11	12	17	24	24	22	21т	RV				
North Carolina A&T	STATS														
North Carolina A&T	C	RV	RV												
Rhode Island	STATS	21	22	21	17	24		RV							
Rhode Island	C	23	22	20	18	RV	25	22	RV				RV	RV	RV
Richmond	STATS	18	RV								RV	RV	RV	22	15
Richmond	C	16	RV	RV	RV	RV							RV	25	22
Stony Brook	STATS														
Stony Brook	C														
Towson	STATS														
Towson	C														
Villanova	STATS	RV	RV	24	25	16	RV	RV	22	19	17	13т	10	6	6
Villanova	C	RV		RV	RV	23	RV	RV	RV	RV	22	18	15	9	9
William & Mary	STATS	4	4	4	5	5	10	11	13	22	24	RV			
William & Mary	C	4	4	4	5	4	9	12	13	24	24	RV	RV	RV	RV

== Home game announced attendance ==
Team	Stadium	Capacity	Game 1	Game 2	Game 3	Game 4	Game 5	Game 6	Game 7	Total	Average	% of capacity
Albany	Tom & Mary Casey Stadium	8,500	---	---	---	---	---	---	---	---	---	---
Campbell	Barker–Lane Stadium	5,500	---	---	---	---	---	---	---	---	---	---
Delaware	Delaware Stadium	18,800	---	---	---	---	---	---	---	---	---	---
Elon	Rhodes Stadium	11,250	---	---	---	---	---	---	---	---	---	---
Hampton	Armstrong Stadium	12,000	---	---	---	---	---	---	---	---	---	---
Maine	Alfond Stadium	10,000	---	---	---	---	---	---	---	---	---	---
Monmouth	Kessler Stadium	4,200	---	---	---	---	---	---	---	---	---	---
New Hampshire	Wildcat Stadium	11,015	---	---	---	---	---	---	---	---	---	---
North Carolina A&T	Truist Stadium	21,500	---	---	---	---	---	---	---	---	---	---
Rhode Island	Meade Stadium	6,555	---	---	---	---	---	---	---	---	---	---
Richmond	E. Claiborne Robins Stadium	8,217	---	---	---	---	---	---	---	---	---	---
Stony Brook	Kenneth P. LaValle Stadium	12,300	---	---	---	---	---	---	---	---	---	---
Towson	Johnny Unitas Stadium	11,198	---	---	---	---	---	---	---	---	---	---
Villanova	Villanova Stadium	12,500	---	---	---	---	---	---	---	---	---	---
William & Mary	Zable Stadium	12,672	---	---	---	---	---	---	---	---	---	---

Bold – exceeded capacity
† Season high
‡ Record stadium Attendance

== NFL draft ==
The following list includes all CAA Players who were drafted in the 2024 NFL draft.

Player	Position	School	Draft Round	Round Pick	Overall Pick	Team	Ref
Dylan Laube	RB	New Hampshire	6	32	208	Las Vegas Raiders	

=== Undrafted free agents ===
The following list includes all CAA Players who went undrafted in the 2024 NFL draft but signed following the draft.

Player	Position	School	Team	Ref
Brevin Easton	WR	Albany	Jacksonville Jaguars	
Mike Edwards	OT	Campbell	Buffalo Bills	
Tyler McLellan	OT	Campbell	Los Angeles Chargers	
Jaden Shirden	RB	Monmouth	Carolina Panthers	
Lorenzo Thompson	OT	Rhode Island	Cleveland Browns	
Ryan Coll	OT	Richmond	Atlanta Falcons	
Robert Javier	CB	Towson	Tennessee Titans	
Jalen Jackson	RB	Villanova	Jacksonville Jaguars	
Nick Torres	G	Villanova	Kansas City Chiefs	
Nate Lynn	OLB	William & Mary	Detroit Lions	

=== Minicamp ===
The following list includes all CAA Players who went undrafted in the 2024 NFL draft but were offered minicamp invites.

Player	Position	School	Team	Ref
Brian Abraham	LB	Albany	Chicago Bears	
Julian Hicks	WR	Albany	Green Bay Packers	
Greg Anderson	OG	Monmouth	New York Jets	
Gene Scott	TE	Monmouth	Buffalo Bills	
Jesus Gibbs	DE	Towson	Kansas City Chiefs	
T.D. Ayo-Durojaiye	RB	Villanova	Chicago Bears	
Jaaron Hayek	WR	Villanova	Kansas City Chiefs	
Ryan Poole	CB	William & Mary	San Francisco 49ers	
