= 2020 Richmond Spiders football team =

American college football season

2020 Richmond Spiders football
- Conference: Colonial Athletic Association
- South

Ranking
- STATS: No. 15
- FCS Coaches: No. 14
- Record: 3–1 (3–1 CAA)
- Head coach: Russ Huesman (4th season)
- Offensive coordinator: Jeff Durden (4th season)
- Co-defensive coordinators: Justin Wood (1st season); Rod West (1st season)
- Home stadium: E. Claiborne Robins Stadium

2020 Colonial Athletic Association football standings
	Conf.			Overall
Team	W		L	W		L
North Division
No. 4 Delaware x$^	4	–	0	7	–	1
No. 18 Rhode Island †	2	–	1	2	–	1
No. 16 Villanova	2	–	2	2	–	2
Maine	2	–	2	2	–	2
Stony Brook	1	–	3	1	–	3
Albany †	1	–	3	1	–	3
New Hampshire †	0	–	1	0	–	1
South Division
No. 3 James Madison x^	3	–	0	7	–	1
No. 15 Richmond	3	–	1	3	–	1
William & Mary	1	–	2	1	–	2
Elon	0	–	4	1	–	5
$ – Conference champion; x – Division champion/co-champions; ^ – FCS playoff participant; Notes: Due to COVID-19, the CAA suspended the fall 2020 football season. Towson opted out of the spring football season. † – Albany, New Hampshire, and Rhode Island opted out of the remainder of the spring season on March 31, April 6, and April 7 respectively.; Rankings from STATS Poll

The 2020 Richmond Spiders football team represented the University of Richmond in the 2020–21 NCAA Division I FCS football season. They were led by fourth-year head coach Russ Huesman and played their home games at E. Claiborne Robins Stadium. The Spiders competed as a member of the Colonial Athletic Association.

On July 17, 2020, the Colonial Athletic Association announced that it would not play fall sports due to the COVID-19 pandemic. However, the conference did allow the option for teams to play as independents for the 2020 season if they still wished to play in the fall.

== Schedule ==
Richmond had a game scheduled against Yale on October 17, which was later canceled before the start of the 2020 season. The CAA released its spring conference schedule on October 27, 2020.

Date	Time	Opponent	Rank	Site	TV	Result	Attendance	Source
March 6, 2021	1:00 p.m.	William & Mary		E. Claiborne Robins Stadium; Richmond, VA (Capital Cup)	FloFootball	W 21–14	1,000	
March 13, 2021	1:00 p.m.	at Elon		Rhodes Stadium; Elon, NC	FloFootball	W 38–14	1,137	
March 20, 2021	4:00 p.m.	at No. 1 James Madison	No. 23	Bridgeforth Stadium; Harrisonburg, VA (rivalry)	FloFootball	Postponed		
March 27, 2021	4:00 p.m.	Elon	No. 21	E. Claiborne Robins Stadium; Richmond, VA	FloFootball	W 31–17	1,000	
April 3, 2021	12:00 p.m.	No. 1 James Madison	No. 15	E. Claiborne Robins Stadium; Richmond, VA (rivalry)	FloFootball	Postponed		
April 10, 2021	1:00 p.m.	at William & Mary	No. 12	Zable Stadium; Williamsburg, VA (Capital Cup)	FloFootball	Canceled		
April 17, 2021	2:00 p.m.	at No. 1 James Madison	No. 11	Bridgeforth Stadium; Harrisonburg, VA (rivalry)	FloFootball	L 6–23	5,713	
Rankings from STATS Poll released prior to the game; All times are in Eastern time
