= 2020 South Carolina State Bulldogs football team =

American college football season

2020 South Carolina State Bulldogs football
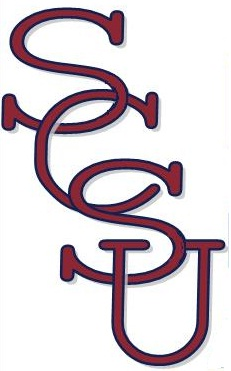
- Conference: Mid-Eastern Athletic Conference
- Record: 3–1 (2–0 MEAC)
- Head coach: Oliver Pough (19th season)
- Home stadium: Oliver C. Dawson Stadium

2020 Mid-Eastern Athletic Conference football standings
	Conf.			Overall
Team	W		L	W		L
North Division
Delaware State	2	–	2	2	–	3
Howard*	0	–	2	0	–	2
South Division
South Carolina State	2	–	0	3	–	1
Notes: Due to COVID-19, the Mid-Eastern Athletic suspended the fall 2020 football season. Florida A&M, Bethune–Cookman, North Carolina Central, North Carolina A&T, Morgan State, and Norfolk State opted out of the spring season. The MEAC suspended the spring season on February 11, due to only having three schools playing in the spring. * – Ineligible for FCS postseason play due to NCAA sanctions; Rankings from STATS Poll

The 2020 South Carolina State Bulldogs football team represented South Carolina State University in the 2020–21 NCAA Division I FCS football season. They were led by 19th-year head coach Oliver Pough. The Bulldogs played their home games at Oliver C. Dawson Stadium. They competed as a member of the Mid-Eastern Athletic Conference (MEAC).

On July 16, 2020, the MEAC announced that it would cancel its fall sports seasons due to the COVID-19 pandemic. The league did not rule out the possibility of playing in the spring, and later released its spring schedule on December 14, 2020.

== Schedule ==
South Carolina State's away and home games scheduled against Howard on March 6 and April 10, respectively, were canceled on March 2 due to COVID-19 travel restrictions.

Date	Time	Opponent	Site	TV	Result	Attendance
March 6	1:30 p.m.	Alabama A&M*	Oliver C. Dawson Stadium; Orangeburg, SC	ESPN3	L 7–31	
March 13	2:00 p.m.	Delaware State	Oliver C. Dawson Stadium; Orangeburg, SC	ESPN3	W 17–9	
April 3	2:00 p.m.	at Alabama State*	New ASU Stadium; Montgomery, AL	WBMM	W 14–7	
April 17	6:00 p.m.	at Delaware State	Alumni Stadium; Dover, DE	ESPN3	W 31–28^{OT}	
*Non-conference game; Rankings from STATS Poll released prior to the game; All times are in Eastern time
