= 2020 James Madison Dukes football team =

American college football season

2020 James Madison Dukes football

CAA South Division champion Lambert Cup winner

NCAA Division I Semifinal, L 35–38 vs. Sam Houston State
- Conference: Colonial Athletic Association
- South Division

Ranking
- STATS: No. 3
- FCS Coaches: No. 3
- Record: 7–1 (3–0 CAA)
- Head coach: Curt Cignetti (2nd season)
- Offensive coordinator: Shane Montgomery (2nd season)
- Offensive scheme: Spread
- Defensive coordinator: Corey Hetherman (2nd season)
- Base defense: 4–3
- Home stadium: Bridgeforth Stadium

2020 Colonial Athletic Association football standings
	Conf.			Overall
Team	W		L	W		L
North Division
No. 4 Delaware x$^	4	–	0	7	–	1
No. 18 Rhode Island †	2	–	1	2	–	1
No. 16 Villanova	2	–	2	2	–	2
Maine	2	–	2	2	–	2
Stony Brook	1	–	3	1	–	3
Albany †	1	–	3	1	–	3
New Hampshire †	0	–	1	0	–	1
South Division
No. 3 James Madison x^	3	–	0	7	–	1
No. 15 Richmond	3	–	1	3	–	1
William & Mary	1	–	2	1	–	2
Elon	0	–	4	1	–	5
$ – Conference champion; x – Division champion/co-champions; ^ – FCS playoff participant; Notes: Due to COVID-19, the CAA suspended the fall 2020 football season. Towson opted out of the spring football season. † – Albany, New Hampshire, and Rhode Island opted out of the remainder of the spring season on March 31, April 6, and April 7 respectively.; Rankings from STATS Poll

The 2020 James Madison Dukes football team represented James Madison University as a member of the Colonial Athletic Association (CAA) during the 2020–21 NCAA Division I FCS football season. They were led by second-year head coach Curt Cignetti and played their home games at Bridgeforth Stadium.

On July 17, 2020, the Colonial Athletic Association announced that it would not play fall sports due to the COVID-19 pandemic, but that they would permit conference members to compete as independents for the fall 2020 season if they still wanted to compete. At the time of the conference postponement, JMU announced that they would opt to compete as an independent for the fall season, however they officially suspended their fall campaign on August 7 preceding the impending postponement of the NCAA FCS Playoffs.

In September, the NCAA announced changes for the Division I Football championship, with a 16-team playoff being conducted from April 18 to May 15.

The Dukes finished the regular season undefeated and won the CAA South Division title. The Dukes were not selected as the conference champions, instead the championship was awarded to Delaware (who also finished the regular season undefeated). The Dukes received an at-large bid to the FCS Playoffs, where they defeated VMI and North Dakota before losing in the semifinals at Sam Houston State, the eventual national champions, whom they blew a 27–10 lead to a matter of minutes.

== Schedule ==
James Madison had originally scheduled non-conference games at North Carolina and at home against Chattanooga and Merrimack, that were canceled due to the coronavirus pandemic.

The CAA released its revised spring conference schedule on October 27, 2020. For the spring season, the CAA was divided into a North and a South division, with James Madison placed in the South Division.

Date	Time	Opponent	Rank	Site	TV	Result	Attendance
February 20, 2021	12:00 p.m.	Morehead State*	No. 2	Bridgeforth Stadium; Harrisonburg, VA	NBCSW/FloFootball	W 52–0	
February 27, 2021	12:00 p.m.	Robert Morris*	No. 2	Bridgeforth Stadium; Harrisonburg, VA	NBCSW/FloFootball	W 36–16	
March 6, 2021	1:30 p.m.	at Elon	No. 1	Rhodes Stadium; Elon, NC	FloFootball	W 20–17	
March 13, 2021	4:00 p.m.	William & Mary	No. 1	Bridgeforth Stadium; Harrisonburg, VA (rivalry)	FloFootball	Postponed	
March 27, 2021	1:00 p.m.	at William & Mary	No. 1	Zable Stadium; Williamsburg, VA	FloFootball	W 38–10	
April 3, 2021	12:00 p.m.	at No. 15 Richmond	No. 1	E. Claiborne Robins Stadium; Richmond, VA (rivalry)	FloFootball	Postponed	
April 10, 2021	4:00 p.m.	Elon	No. 1	Bridgeforth Stadium; Harrisonburg, VA	FloFootball	Postponed	
April 17, 2021	2:00 p.m.	No. 11 Richmond	No. 1	Bridgeforth Stadium; Harrisonburg, VA	FloFootball	W 23–6	
April 24, 2021	2:00 p.m.	No. 11 VMI*	No. 1	Bridgeforth Stadium; Harrisonburg, VA (NCAA Division I First Round)	ESPN3	W 31–24	
May 2, 2021	6:00 p.m.	No. 7 North Dakota*	No. 1	Bridgeforth Stadium; Harrisonburg, VA (NCAA Division I Quarterfinal)	ESPN2	W 34–21	
May 8, 2021	2:30 p.m.	at No. 4 Sam Houston State*	No. 1	Bowers Stadium; Huntsville, TX (NCAA Division I Semifinal)	ABC	L 35–38	
*Non-conference game; Rankings from STATS Poll released prior to the game; All times are in Eastern time
