= 2020 William & Mary Tribe football team =

American college football season

2020 William & Mary Tribe football
- Conference: Colonial Athletic Association
- South Division
- Record: 1–2 (1–2 CAA)
- Head coach: Mike London (2nd season)
- Offensive coordinator: Brennan Marion (2nd season)
- Defensive coordinator: Vincent Brown (2nd season)
- Captains: Tyler Crist; Carl Fowler; Ted Hefter; Ryan Ripley
- Home stadium: Zable Stadium

2020 Colonial Athletic Association football standings
	Conf.			Overall
Team	W		L	W		L
North Division
No. 4 Delaware x$^	4	–	0	7	–	1
No. 18 Rhode Island †	2	–	1	2	–	1
No. 16 Villanova	2	–	2	2	–	2
Maine	2	–	2	2	–	2
Stony Brook	1	–	3	1	–	3
Albany †	1	–	3	1	–	3
New Hampshire †	0	–	1	0	–	1
South Division
No. 3 James Madison x^	3	–	0	7	–	1
No. 15 Richmond	3	–	1	3	–	1
William & Mary	1	–	2	1	–	2
Elon	0	–	4	1	–	5
$ – Conference champion; x – Division champion/co-champions; ^ – FCS playoff participant; Notes: Due to COVID-19, the CAA suspended the fall 2020 football season. Towson opted out of the spring football season. † – Albany, New Hampshire, and Rhode Island opted out of the remainder of the spring season on March 31, April 6, and April 7 respectively.; Rankings from STATS Poll

The 2020 William & Mary Tribe football team represented the College of William & Mary as a member of the Colonial Athletic Association (CAA) in the 2020–21 NCAA Division I FCS football season. The Tribe, led by second-year head coach Mike London, play their home games at Zable Stadium.

On July 17, 2020, the CAA announced that it would not play fall sports due to the COVID-19 pandemic. The conference allowed the option for teams to play as independents for the 2020 season if they still wished to play in the fall.

== Schedule ==
William & Mary had games scheduled against Stanford (September 5), Colgate (September 12), and Lafayette (September 19), which were all later canceled before the start of the 2020 season. The CAA released its spring conference schedule on October 27, 2020.

Date	Time	Opponent	Site	TV	Result	Attendance
March 6, 2021	1:00 p.m.	at Richmond	E. Claiborne Robins Stadium; Richmond, VA (Capital Cup)	FloFootball	L 14–21	
March 13, 2021	4:00 p.m.	at No. 1 James Madison	Bridgeforth Stadium; Harrisonburg, VA (rivalry)	FloFootball	Postponed	
March 20, 2021	4:00 p.m.	Elon	Zable Stadium; Williamsburg, VA	FloFootball	W 31–10	
March 27, 2021	1:00 p.m.	No. 1 James Madison	Zable Stadium; Williamsburg, VA (rivalry)	FloFootball	L 10–38	
April 3, 2021	4:00 p.m.	at Elon	Rhodes Stadium; Elon, NC	FloFootball	Postponed	
~~April 10, 2021~~	~~1:00 p.m.~~	~~No. 12 Richmond~~	~~Zable Stadium~~; ~~Williamsburg, VA (Capital Cup)~~	~~FloFootball~~	Canceled	
Rankings from STATS Poll released prior to the game; All times are in Eastern time
