= 2020 Stony Brook Seawolves football team =

American college football season

2020 Stony Brook Seawolves football
- Conference: Colonial Athletic Association
- North
- Record: 1–3 (1–3 CAA)
- Head coach: Chuck Priore (15th season)
- Co-offensive coordinators: Carmen Felus (4th season); Chris Bache (4th season)
- Defensive coordinator: Rob Noel (1st season)
- Home stadium: Kenneth P. LaValle Stadium

2020 Colonial Athletic Association football standings
	Conf.			Overall
Team	W		L	W		L
North Division
No. 4 Delaware x$^	4	–	0	7	–	1
No. 18 Rhode Island †	2	–	1	2	–	1
No. 16 Villanova	2	–	2	2	–	2
Maine	2	–	2	2	–	2
Stony Brook	1	–	3	1	–	3
Albany †	1	–	3	1	–	3
New Hampshire †	0	–	1	0	–	1
South Division
No. 3 James Madison x^	3	–	0	7	–	1
No. 15 Richmond	3	–	1	3	–	1
William & Mary	1	–	2	1	–	2
Elon	0	–	4	1	–	5
$ – Conference champion; x – Division champion/co-champions; ^ – FCS playoff participant; Notes: Due to COVID-19, the CAA suspended the fall 2020 football season. Towson opted out of the spring football season. † – Albany, New Hampshire, and Rhode Island opted out of the remainder of the spring season on March 31, April 6, and April 7 respectively.; Rankings from STATS Poll

The 2020 Stony Brook Seawolves football team represented Stony Brook University in the 2020–21 NCAA Division I FCS football season. They were led by Chuck Priore in his 15th season as head coach and played their home games at Kenneth P. LaValle Stadium in Stony Brook, New York. The Seawolves competed as a member of the Colonial Athletic Association.

On July 17, 2020, the Colonial Athletic Association announced that it would not play fall sports due to the COVID-19 pandemic. However, the conference is allowing the option for teams to play as independents for the 2020 season if they still wish to play in the fall.

Three players from the 2020 Stony Brook team signed undrafted free agent contracts after the 2021 NFL draft. Safety Augie Contressa signed with the Tampa Bay Buccaneers, defensive tackle Sam Kamara signed with the Chicago Bears and defensive back TJ Morrison signed with the Las Vegas Raiders.

== Schedule ==
Stony Brook had a game scheduled against Fordham on August 29, which was later canceled before the start of the 2020 season. This game was replaced with a game against FBS Western Michigan, which would have paid Stony Brook $325,000. Stony Brook was also originally scheduled to play FBS Florida Atlantic, which would have paid Stony Brook $400,000. Stony Brook's home opener was originally scheduled for September 26 against Sacred Heart. All games on the original 11-game schedule were canceled on July 17, 2020.

The CAA released its spring conference schedule on October 27, 2020.

Date	Time	Opponent	Site	TV	Result	Attendance
March 6, 2021	12:00 p.m.	No. 5 Villanova	Kenneth P. LaValle Stadium; Stony Brook, NY	FloFootball	L 13–16	
March 13, 2021	12:00 p.m.	at No. 19 Delaware	Delaware Stadium; Newark, DE	FloFootball	L 3–31	
March 20, 2021	12:00 p.m.	Maine	Kenneth P. LaValle Stadium; Stony Brook, NY	FloFootball	L 19–35	
March 27, 2021	1:00 p.m.	at Albany	Bob Ford Field at Tom & Mary Casey Stadium; Albany, NY (rivalry)	FloFootball	W 21–7	
~~April 10, 2021~~	~~12:00 p.m.~~	~~at New Hampshire~~	~~Wildcat Stadium~~; ~~Durham, NH~~	~~FloFootball~~	Canceled	
~~April 17, 2021~~	~~12:00 p.m.~~	~~Rhode Island~~	~~Kenneth P. LaValle Stadium~~; ~~Stony Brook, NY~~	~~FloFootball~~	Canceled	
Rankings from STATS Poll released prior to the game; All times are in Eastern time
