= 2020 Albany Great Danes football team =

American college football season

2020 Albany Great Danes football
- Conference: Colonial Athletic Association
- North Division
- Record: 1–3 (1–3 CAA)
- Head coach: Greg Gattuso (7th season)
- Offensive coordinator: Joe Davis (3rd season)
- Defensive coordinator: Joe Bernard (3rd season)
- Home stadium: Bob Ford Field at Tom & Mary Casey Stadium

2020 Colonial Athletic Association football standings
	Conf.			Overall
Team	W		L	W		L
North Division
No. 4 Delaware x$^	4	–	0	7	–	1
No. 18 Rhode Island †	2	–	1	2	–	1
No. 16 Villanova	2	–	2	2	–	2
Maine	2	–	2	2	–	2
Stony Brook	1	–	3	1	–	3
Albany †	1	–	3	1	–	3
New Hampshire †	0	–	1	0	–	1
South Division
No. 3 James Madison x^	3	–	0	7	–	1
No. 15 Richmond	3	–	1	3	–	1
William & Mary	1	–	2	1	–	2
Elon	0	–	4	1	–	5
$ – Conference champion; x – Division champion/co-champions; ^ – FCS playoff participant; Notes: Due to COVID-19, the CAA suspended the fall 2020 football season. Towson opted out of the spring football season. † – Albany, New Hampshire, and Rhode Island opted out of the remainder of the spring season on March 31, April 6, and April 7 respectively.; Rankings from STATS Poll

The 2020 Albany Great Danes football team represented the University at Albany, SUNY as a member of the North Division Colonial Athletic Association 2020–21 NCAA Division I FCS football season. Led by seventh-year head coach Greg Gattuso, the Great Danes compiled an overall record of 1–3 with an identical mark in conference play, placing fifth in the CAA's North Division. The team played home games at Bob Ford Field at Tom & Mary Casey Stadium in Albany, New York.

On July 17, 2020, the Colonial Athletic Association announced that it would not play fall sports due to the COVID-19 pandemic. However, the conference allowed the option for teams to play as independents in the fall of 2020.

== Schedule ==
Albany originally had a game scheduled against Delaware State (September 5), but it was canceled on July 16 due to the MEAC's decision to cancel fall sports due to the COVID-19 pandemic. The CAA released its spring conference schedule on October 27, 2020. On March 31, 2021, Albany canceled their remaining games due to injuries.

Date	Time	Opponent	Rank	Site	TV	Result	Attendance
March 5	7:00 p.m.	at No. 14 New Hampshire	No. 13	Wildcat Stadium; Durham, NH	FloFootball	W 24–20	0
March 13	12:00 p.m.	at Maine	No. 13	Alfond Stadium; Orono, ME	FloFootball	L 34–38	0
March 20	1:00 p.m.	Rhode Island	No. 18	Bob Ford Field at Tom & Mary Casey Stadium; Albany, NY	FloFootball	L 10–17 ^{OT}	0
March 27	1:00 p.m.	Stony Brook		Bob Ford Field at Tom & Mary Casey Stadium; Albany, NY (rivalry)	FloFootball	L 7–21	0
April 3	12:00 p.m.	at No. 8 Delaware		Delaware Stadium; Newark, DE	FloFootball	Canceled	
April 10	1:00 p.m.	Villanova		Bob Ford Field at Tom & Mary Casey Stadium; Albany, NY	FloFootball	Canceled	
Rankings from STATS Poll released prior to the game; All times are in Eastern time
