= 2020 Howard Bison football team =

American college football season

2020 Howard Bison football
- Conference: Mid-Eastern Athletic Conference
- North Division
- Record: 0–2 (0–2 MEAC)
- Head coach: Larry Scott (1st season)
- Offensive coordinator: Lee Hull (1st season)
- Defensive coordinator: Troy Douglas (1st season)
- Home stadium: William H. Greene Stadium

2020 Mid-Eastern Athletic Conference football standings
	Conf.			Overall
Team	W		L	W		L
North Division
Delaware State	2	–	2	2	–	3
Howard*	0	–	2	0	–	2
South Division
South Carolina State	2	–	0	3	–	1
Notes: Due to COVID-19, the Mid-Eastern Athletic suspended the fall 2020 football season. Florida A&M, Bethune–Cookman, North Carolina Central, North Carolina A&T, Morgan State, and Norfolk State opted out of the spring season. The MEAC suspended the spring season on February 11, due to only having three schools playing in the spring. * – Ineligible for FCS postseason play due to NCAA sanctions; Rankings from STATS Poll

The 2020 Howard Bison football team represented Howard University as a member of the North Division of the Mid-Eastern Athletic Conference (MEAC) during the 2020–21 NCAA Division I FCS football season. Led by first-year head coach Larry Scott, the Bison compiled an overall record of 0–2 with an identical mark in conference play, placing last out of two teams in the MEAC's North Division. Howard played home games at William H. Greene Stadium in Washington, D.C.

On July 16, 2020, the MEAC announced that it would cancel its fall sports seasons due to the COVID-19 pandemic. The league did not rule out the possibility of playing in the spring, and later released its spring schedule on December 14, 2020.

== Schedule ==
Howard was scheduled to compete in the 2020 playing of the Black College Football Hall of Fame Classic against Central State on September 6, but the game was canceled before the start of the 2020 season. Their game against Hampton was also canceled before the season began.

Home and away games against South Carolina State, scheduled for March 6 and April 10, respectively, were canceled on March 2 due to COVID-19 travel restrictions.

Date	Time	Opponent	Site	TV	Result	Attendance
February 27	12:00 p.m.	at Delaware State	Alumni Stadium; Dover, DE	ESPN3	L 10–17	0
April 3	1:00 p.m.	Delaware State	William H. Greene Stadium; Washington, DC	ESPN3	L 28–37	
All times are in Eastern time
