= 2020 Rhode Island Rams football team =

American college football season

2020 Rhode Island Rams football
- Conference: Colonial Athletic Association
- North Division

Ranking
- STATS: No. 18
- FCS Coaches: No. 24
- Record: 2–1 (2–1 CAA)
- Head coach: Jim Fleming (7th season)
- Offensive coordinator: Patrick Murphy (1st season)
- Defensive coordinator: Jack Cooper (1st season)
- Home stadium: Meade Stadium

2020 Colonial Athletic Association football standings
	Conf.			Overall
Team	W		L	W		L
North Division
No. 4 Delaware x$^	4	–	0	7	–	1
No. 18 Rhode Island †	2	–	1	2	–	1
No. 16 Villanova	2	–	2	2	–	2
Maine	2	–	2	2	–	2
Stony Brook	1	–	3	1	–	3
Albany †	1	–	3	1	–	3
New Hampshire †	0	–	1	0	–	1
South Division
No. 3 James Madison x^	3	–	0	7	–	1
No. 15 Richmond	3	–	1	3	–	1
William & Mary	1	–	2	1	–	2
Elon	0	–	4	1	–	5
$ – Conference champion; x – Division champion/co-champions; ^ – FCS playoff participant; Notes: Due to COVID-19, the CAA suspended the fall 2020 football season. Towson opted out of the spring football season. † – Albany, New Hampshire, and Rhode Island opted out of the remainder of the spring season on March 31, April 6, and April 7 respectively.; Rankings from STATS Poll

The 2020 Rhode Island Rams football team represented the University of Rhode Island in the 2020–21 NCAA Division I FCS football season. They were led by seventh-year head coach Jim Fleming and played their home games at Meade Stadium. They competed as a member of the Colonial Athletic Association.

On July 17, 2020, the Colonial Athletic Association announced that it would not play fall sports due to the COVID-19 pandemic. However, the conference is allowing the option for teams to play as independents for the 2020 season if they still wish to play in the fall.

On April 7, 2021, the team announced that its season would end earlier than expected due to a mandated pause in team activities resulting from positive COVID-19 cases that extended past their last scheduled game.

== Schedule ==
Rhode Island had a game scheduled against Brown on October 3, which was later canceled before the start of the 2020 season. The CAA released its spring conference schedule on October 27, 2020.

Date	Time	Opponent	Rank	Site	TV	Result	Attendance
March 13, 2021	1:00 p.m.	at No. 6 Villanova		Villanova Stadium; Villanova, PA	FloFootball	W 40–37 ^{OT}	
March 20, 2021	1:00 p.m.	at No. 18 Albany		Bob Ford Field at Tom & Mary Casey Stadium; Albany, NY	FloFootball	W 17–10 ^{OT}	
March 27, 2021	12:00 p.m.	No. 11 Delaware	No. 18	Meade Stadium; Kingston, RI	FloFootball	L 21–35	
April 3, 2021	1:00 p.m.	New Hampshire	No. 22	Meade Stadium; Kingston, RI	FloFootball	Canceled	
April 10, 2021	12:00 p.m.	Maine	No. 22	Meade Stadium; Kingston, RI	FloFootball	Canceled	
April 17, 2021	12:00 p.m.	at Stony Brook		Kenneth P. LaValle Stadium; Stony Brook, NY	FloFootball	Canceled	
Rankings from STATS Poll released prior to the game; All times are in Eastern time
