= 2020 Maine Black Bears football team =

American college football season

2020 Maine Black Bears football
- Conference: Colonial Athletic Association
- North Division
- Record: 2–2 (2–2 CAA)
- Head coach: Nick Charlton (2nd season)
- Offensive coordinator: Andrew Dresner (2nd season)
- Defensive coordinator: Michael Ryan (2nd season)
- Home stadium: Alfond Stadium

2020 Colonial Athletic Association football standings
	Conf.			Overall
Team	W		L	W		L
North Division
No. 4 Delaware x$^	4	–	0	7	–	1
No. 18 Rhode Island †	2	–	1	2	–	1
No. 16 Villanova	2	–	2	2	–	2
Maine	2	–	2	2	–	2
Stony Brook	1	–	3	1	–	3
Albany †	1	–	3	1	–	3
New Hampshire †	0	–	1	0	–	1
South Division
No. 3 James Madison x^	3	–	0	7	–	1
No. 15 Richmond	3	–	1	3	–	1
William & Mary	1	–	2	1	–	2
Elon	0	–	4	1	–	5
$ – Conference champion; x – Division champion/co-champions; ^ – FCS playoff participant; Notes: Due to COVID-19, the CAA suspended the fall 2020 football season. Towson opted out of the spring football season. † – Albany, New Hampshire, and Rhode Island opted out of the remainder of the spring season on March 31, April 6, and April 7 respectively.; Rankings from STATS Poll

The 2020 Maine Black Bears football team represented the University of Maine in the 2020–21 NCAA Division I FCS football season. They played their home games at Alfond Stadium. They were a member of the Colonial Athletic Association. They were led by second-year head coach Nick Charlton.

On July 17, 2020, the Colonial Athletic Association announced that it would not play fall sports due to the COVID-19 pandemic. However, the conference is allowing the option for teams to play as independents for the 2020 season if they still wish to play in the fall.

== Transfers ==
=== Outgoing ===
Over the off-season, Maine lost nine players through the transfer portal.

Name	Pos.	New school
Adam Bertrand	LB	Husson
Cameron Carson	K/P	UMass
Kenny Doak	K/P	SEMO
Chris Ferguson	QB	Liberty
Migel Garcia	OL	Sam Houston State
Anthony Griffin	OL	New Haven
Grant Hartley	QB	Worcester State
Zoltan Panyi	QB	New Haven
Maximilian Roberts	DE	Boston College

=== Incoming ===
Over the off-season, Maine added eighteen players through the transfer portal.

Name	Pos.	Class	Previous school
Elijah Barnwell	RB	R-SO	Rutgers
Fofie Bazzie	S	R-JR	Maryland
Garrison Burnett	WR	R-JR	UConn
Austin Chambers	DT	GR	BYU
Charles Eberle	LS/LB	R-FR	Ithaca
George French II	OT	FR	Penn State
Jalen Jordan	WR	R-SO	Rutgers
Mike-Lee Joseph	S	JR	Pace
Sterling McDowell-Hagans	DB	SO	Husson
Jonny Messina	K	GR	Stetson
Shawn Page, Jr.	OG	GR	Bloomsburg
Steve Petrick	TE	GR	Robert Morris
Richie Pekmezian	K	SO	Indiana State
Kolubah Pewee, Jr.	CB	FR	Army
Zavier Scott	WR	R-JR	UConn
Ryan Silvious	IOL	SO	Temple
Vincent Thomas	LB	FR	Navy
Jack Webb	OG	SO	Sacred Heart

== Schedule ==
The CAA released its spring conference schedule on October 27, 2020.

Date	Time	Opponent	Site	TV	Result	Attendance
March 6, 2021	12:00 p.m.	at No. 25 Delaware	Delaware Stadium; Newark, DE	FloFootball	L 0–37	
March 13, 2021	12:00 p.m.	No. 13 Albany	Alfond Stadium; Orono, ME	FloFootball	W 38–34	
March 20, 2021	12:00 p.m.	at Stony Brook	Kenneth P. LaValle Stadium; Stony Brook, NY	FloFootball	W 35–19	
April 3, 2021	12:00 p.m.	No. 16 Villanova	Alfond Stadium; Orono, ME	FloFootball	L 17–44	
April 10, 2021	12:00 p.m.	at No. 22 Rhode Island	Meade Stadium; Kingston, RI	FloFootball	Canceled	
April 17, 2021	2:00 p.m.	New Hampshire	Alfond Stadium; Orono, ME (Battle for the Brice-Cowell Musket)	FloFootball	Canceled	
Rankings from STATS Poll released prior to the game; All times are in Eastern time
