= Black College Football Hall of Fame Classic =

College football game in Ohio, U.S.

- Stadium: Tom Benson Hall of Fame Stadium
- Location: Canton, Ohio, U.S.
- Operated: 2019–present
- Website: www.profootballhof.com/black-college-football-hall-of-fame-classic/

2025 matchup
- Virginia Union vs. Miles (Virginia Union 45–3)

2026 matchup
- Albany State vs. Johnson C. Smith (Johnson C. Smith 27–7)

The Black College Football Hall of Fame Classic is a college football kickoff game that has been played annually since 2019 at Tom Benson Hall of Fame Stadium in Canton, Ohio. The game features a matchup of two historically black colleges and universities (HBCUs). It is played on the Sunday before Labor Day. Since its inception, the game has been carried nationally by NFL Network and has featured teams from Division I FCS or Division II.

The Classic originated in 2019, with a matchup between the Alabama A&M Bulldogs and the Morehouse Maroon Tigers, and coincided with the Black College Football Hall of Fame's move to Canton from its previous location in Atlanta. The 2020 edition of the Classic, scheduled between Howard and Central State, was canceled over concerns related to the COVID-19 pandemic.

== Game results ==
Season	Date	Winning team		Losing team		Television	Attendance	Ref.
2019	September 1	Alabama A&M	35	Morehouse	30	NFL Network	9,776	
2020	September 6	Cancelled due to COVID-19 pandemic †				—N/a	—N/a	
2021	September 5	Grambling State	16	Tennessee State	10	NFL Network	14,682	
2022	September 4	Central State (OH)	41	Winston-Salem State	21	NFL Network	13,989	
2023	September 3	Virginia Union	45	Morehouse	13	NFL Network	9,333	
2024	September 1	Virginia State	23	Benedict	7	NFL Network	3,747	
2025	August 31	Virginia Union	45	Miles	3	NFL Network	3,223	
2026	September 6	Johnson C. Smith	27	Albany State	7	NFL Network	2,552	

† Originally scheduled as Howard vs. Central State (OH)
