= 2020 Elon Phoenix football team =

American college football season

2020 Elon Phoenix football
- Conference: Colonial Athletic Association
- South
- Record: 1–5 (0–4 CAA)
- Head coach: Tony Trisciani (2nd season)
- Offensive coordinator: Drew Folmar (4th season)
- Defensive coordinator: Billy Crocker (2nd season)
- Home stadium: Rhodes Stadium

2020 Colonial Athletic Association football standings
	Conf.			Overall
Team	W		L	W		L
North Division
No. 4 Delaware x$^	4	–	0	7	–	1
No. 18 Rhode Island †	2	–	1	2	–	1
No. 16 Villanova	2	–	2	2	–	2
Maine	2	–	2	2	–	2
Stony Brook	1	–	3	1	–	3
Albany †	1	–	3	1	–	3
New Hampshire †	0	–	1	0	–	1
South Division
No. 3 James Madison x^	3	–	0	7	–	1
No. 15 Richmond	3	–	1	3	–	1
William & Mary	1	–	2	1	–	2
Elon	0	–	4	1	–	5
$ – Conference champion; x – Division champion/co-champions; ^ – FCS playoff participant; Notes: Due to COVID-19, the CAA suspended the fall 2020 football season. Towson opted out of the spring football season. † – Albany, New Hampshire, and Rhode Island opted out of the remainder of the spring season on March 31, April 6, and April 7 respectively.; Rankings from STATS Poll

The 2020 Elon Phoenix football team represented Elon University in the 2020–21 NCAA Division I FCS football season. They were led by second-year head coach Tony Trisciani and played their home games at Rhodes Stadium. Theyed play as members of the Colonial Athletic Association (CAA).

On July 17, 2020, the Colonial Athletic Association announced that it would not play fall sports due to the COVID-19 pandemic. However, the conference is allowing the option for teams to play as independents for the 2020 season if they still wish to play in the fall.

== Schedule ==
The CAA released its spring conference schedule on October 27, 2020.

Date	Time	Opponent	Rank	Site	TV	Result	Attendance
February 20, 2021	1:30 p.m.	Davidson*		Rhodes Stadium; Elon, NC	FloFootball	W 26–23	
February 27, 2021	3:00 p.m.	at Gardner–Webb*	No. 24	Ernest W. Spangler Stadium; Boiling Springs, NC	ESPN+	L 20–42	
March 6, 2021	1:30 p.m.	No. 1 James Madison		Rhodes Stadium; Elon, NC	FloFootball	L 17–20	
March 13, 2021	1:00 p.m.	Richmond		Rhodes Stadium; Elon, NC	FloFootball	L 14–38	
March 20, 2021	4:00 p.m.	at William & Mary		Zable Stadium; Williamsburg, VA	FloFootball	L 10–31	
March 27, 2021	4:00 p.m.	at No. 21 Richmond		E. Claiborne Robins Stadium; Richmond, VA	FloFootball	L 17–31	
April 3, 2021	4:00 p.m.	William & Mary		Rhodes Stadium; Elon, NC	FloFootball	Postponed	
April 10, 2021	4:00 p.m.	at No. 1 James Madison		Bridgeforth Stadium; Harrisonburg, VA	FloFootball	Postponed	
*Non-conference game; Rankings from STATS Poll released prior to the game; All times are in Eastern time
