= 2020 Villanova Wildcats football team =

American college football season

2020 Villanova Wildcats football
- Conference: Colonial Athletic Association
- North

Ranking
- STATS: No. 16
- FCS Coaches: No. 16
- Record: 2–2 (2–2 CAA)
- Head coach: Mark Ferrante (4th season)
- Offensive coordinator: Chris Boden (2nd season)
- Offensive scheme: Spread
- Defensive coordinator: Ola Adams (2nd season)
- Base defense: 3–3–5
- Home stadium: Villanova Stadium

2020 Colonial Athletic Association football standings
	Conf.			Overall
Team	W		L	W		L
North Division
No. 4 Delaware x$^	4	–	0	7	–	1
No. 18 Rhode Island †	2	–	1	2	–	1
No. 16 Villanova	2	–	2	2	–	2
Maine	2	–	2	2	–	2
Stony Brook	1	–	3	1	–	3
Albany †	1	–	3	1	–	3
New Hampshire †	0	–	1	0	–	1
South Division
No. 3 James Madison x^	3	–	0	7	–	1
No. 15 Richmond	3	–	1	3	–	1
William & Mary	1	–	2	1	–	2
Elon	0	–	4	1	–	5
$ – Conference champion; x – Division champion/co-champions; ^ – FCS playoff participant; Notes: Due to COVID-19, the CAA suspended the fall 2020 football season. Towson opted out of the spring football season. † – Albany, New Hampshire, and Rhode Island opted out of the remainder of the spring season on March 31, April 6, and April 7 respectively.; Rankings from STATS Poll

The 2020 Villanova Wildcats football team represented Villanova University in the 2020–21 NCAA Division I FCS football season. They were led by fourth-year head coach Mark Ferrante and played their home games at Villanova Stadium. They competed as a member of the Colonial Athletic Association.

On July 17, 2020, the Colonial Athletic Association announced that it would not play fall sports due to the COVID-19 pandemic. However, the conference is allowing the option for teams to play as independents for the 2020 season if they still wish to play in the fall.

== Schedule ==
Villanova had games scheduled against Lehigh (September 3) and Bucknell (September 12), but canceled these games on July 13 due to the Patriot League's decision to cancel fall sports due to the COVID-19 pandemic. The CAA released its spring conference schedule on October 27, 2020.

Date	Time	Opponent	Rank	Site	TV	Result	Attendance
March 6, 2021	12:00 p.m.	at Stony Brook	No. 5	Kenneth P. LaValle Stadium; Stony Brook, NY	FloFootball	W 16–13	
March 13, 2021	1:00 p.m.	Rhode Island	No. 6	Villanova Stadium; Villanova, PA	FloFootball	L 37–40 ^{OT}	
March 27, 2021	1:00 p.m.	No. 24 New Hampshire	No. 16	Villanova Stadium; Villanova, PA	FloFootball	Canceled	
April 3, 2021	12:00 p.m.	at Maine	No. 16	Alfond Stadium; Orono, ME	FloFootball	W 44–17	
April 10, 2021	1:00 p.m.	at Albany	No. 11	Bob Ford Field at Tom & Mary Casey Stadium; Albany, NY	FloFootball	Canceled	
April 17, 2021	1:00 p.m.	No. 7 Delaware	No. 10	Villanova Stadium; Villanova, PA (Battle of the Blue)	FloFootball	L 20–27	
Rankings from STATS Poll released prior to the game; All times are in Eastern time
