= 2020 Delaware Fightin' Blue Hens football team =

American college football season

2020 Delaware Fightin' Blue Hens football

CAA champion CAA North Division champion

NCAA Division I Semifinal, L 3–33 vs. South Dakota State
- Conference: Colonial Athletic Association
- North Division

Ranking
- STATS: No. 5
- FCS Coaches: No. 5
- Record: 7–1 (4–0 CAA)
- Head coach: Danny Rocco (4th season)
- Offensive coordinator: Jared Ambrose (2nd season)
- Offensive scheme: Spread
- Defensive coordinator: Manny Rojas (1st season)
- Base defense: 3–3–5
- Home stadium: Delaware Stadium

2020 Colonial Athletic Association football standings
	Conf.			Overall
Team	W		L	W		L
North Division
No. 4 Delaware x$^	4	–	0	7	–	1
No. 18 Rhode Island †	2	–	1	2	–	1
No. 16 Villanova	2	–	2	2	–	2
Maine	2	–	2	2	–	2
Stony Brook	1	–	3	1	–	3
Albany †	1	–	3	1	–	3
New Hampshire †	0	–	1	0	–	1
South Division
No. 3 James Madison x^	3	–	0	7	–	1
No. 15 Richmond	3	–	1	3	–	1
William & Mary	1	–	2	1	–	2
Elon	0	–	4	1	–	5
$ – Conference champion; x – Division champion/co-champions; ^ – FCS playoff participant; Notes: Due to COVID-19, the CAA suspended the fall 2020 football season. Towson opted out of the spring football season. † – Albany, New Hampshire, and Rhode Island opted out of the remainder of the spring season on March 31, April 6, and April 7 respectively.; Rankings from STATS Poll

The 2020 Delaware Fightin' Blue Hens football team represented the University of Delaware as a member of the North Division of the Colonial Athletic Association (CAA) during the 2020–21 NCAA Division I FCS football season. Led by fourth-year head coach Danny Rocco, the Fightin' Blue Hens compiled an overall record of 7–1 with a mark of 4–0 in conference play, winning the CAA and CAA North Division titles. Delaware advanced to the NCAA Division I Football Championship playoffs, the Fightin' Blue Hens beat Sacred Heart in the first round and Jacksonville State in the quarterfinals before losing to eventual national runner-up, South Dakota State, in the semifinals. The team played home games at Delaware Stadium in Newark, Delaware.

On July 17, 2020, the CAA announced that it would not play fall sports due to the COVID-19 pandemic. Although the conference allowed the option for teams to play as independents for the 2020 season if they still wish to play in the fall, the Blue Hens postponed their season until spring 2021.

== Schedule ==
Delaware originally had a game scheduled against Delaware State (November 21), but it was canceled on July 16 due to the Mid-Eastern Athletic Conference (MEAC)'s decision to cancel fall sports due to the COVID-19 pandemic. The CAA released its spring conference schedule on October 27, 2020.

Date	Time	Opponent	Rank	Site	TV	Result	Attendance	Source
March 6, 2021	12:00 p.m.	Maine	No. 25	Delaware Stadium; Newark, DE	FloFootball	W 37–0		
March 13, 2021	12:00 p.m.	Stony Brook	No. 19	Delaware Stadium; Newark, DE	FloFootball	W 31–3	1,800	
March 20, 2021	12:00 p.m.	at No. 20 New Hampshire	No. 12	Wildcat Stadium; Durham, NH	FloFootball	Canceled		
March 27, 2021	12:00 p.m.	at No. 18 Rhode Island	No. 11	Meade Stadium; Kingston, RI	FloFootball	W 35–21		
April 3, 2021	12:00 p.m.	Albany	No. 8	Delaware Stadium; Newark, DE	FloFootball	Canceled		
April 10, 2021	6:00 p.m.	at Delaware State*	No. 8	Alumni Stadium; Dover, DE (Route 1 Rivalry)	ESPN2	W 34–14		
April 17, 2021	1:00 p.m.	at No. 10 Villanova	No. 7	Villanova Stadium; Villanova, PA (Battle of the Blue)	FloFootball	W 27–20		
April 24, 2021	7:00 p.m.	Sacred Heart*	No. 5	Delaware Stadium; Newark, DE (NCAA Division I First Round)	ESPN3	W 19–10		
May 2, 2021	3:00 p.m.	at No. 8 Jacksonville State*	No. 5	JSU Stadium; Jacksonville, AL (NCAA Division I Quarterfinal)	ESPN3	W 20–14		
May 8, 2021	12:00 p.m.	at No. 2 South Dakota State*	No. 5	Dana J. Dykhouse Stadium; Brookings, SD (NCAA Division I Semifinal)	ESPN	L 3–33		
*Non-conference game; Rankings from STATS Poll released prior to the game; All times are in Eastern time

== Coaching staff ==
Name	Position	Year	Alma mater
Danny Rocco	Head coach	4th	Wake Forest (1984)
Jared Ambrose	Offensive coordinator	4th	Shepherd (2007)
Bryan Stinespring	Assistant head coach/offensive line	1st	James Madison (1985)
Levern Belin	Defensive line coach	4th	Wake Forest (1991)
Holman Copeland	Cornerbacks coach	2nd	Clarion (2006)
Jalen Kindle	Defensive assistant coach	3rd	Delaware (2017)
Dave Legg	Outside Linebackers/special teams coordinator	2nd	
Greg Meyer	Running backs coach	3rd	Buffalo State (2009)
Bill Polin	Tight ends coach/recruiting coordinator	4th	Colby (2000)
Alex Wood	Wide receivers coach	3rd	Iowa (1978)
Tony Palmieri	Video coordinator	4th	North Florida (2009)
Carl Kotz	Director of football operations	4th	Clemson (2003)
Chris Stewart	Strength and conditioning	4th	Western Carolina (1998)
