= Sean McDonnell =

American football player and coach (born 1956)

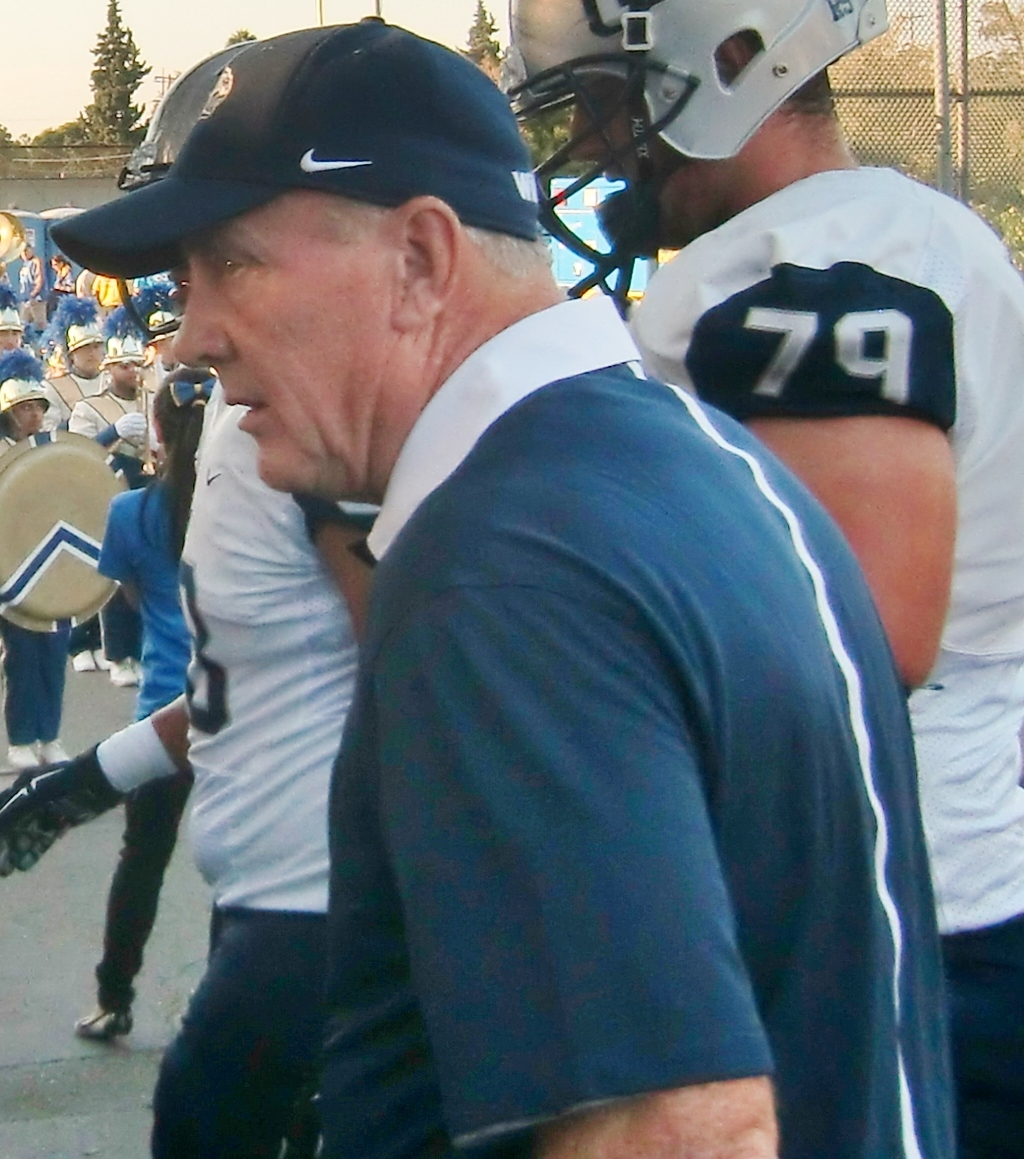
- McDonnell in 2015 at Spartan Stadium before a game against San Jose State

Biographical details
- Born: October 15, 1956 (age 70); Saratoga Springs, New York, U.S.

Playing career
- 1975–1978: New Hampshire
- Position: Defensive back

Coaching career (HC unless noted)
- 1983–1984: Hamilton (DC)
- 1985–1987: Boston University (WR/TE)
- 1988: Boston College (GA)
- 1989–1990: Columbia (OLB)
- 1991–1993: New Hampshire (WR/QB)
- 1994–1998: New Hampshire (OC)
- 1999–2018: New Hampshire
- 2020–2021: New Hampshire

Head coaching record
- Overall: 157–104
- Tournaments: 14–14 (NCAA Division I-AA/FCS playoffs)

Accomplishments and honors

Championships
- 1 A-10 (2005); 1 CAA (2014); 2 A-10 North Division (2004–2005); 2 CAA North Division (2008–2009)

Awards
- 2× Eddie Robinson Award (2005, 2014)

Sean Patrick McDonnell (born October 15, 1956) is a retired college football coach and former player, best known for his tenure as head football coach at the University of New Hampshire.

== Biography ==
McDonnell, nicknamed "Coach Mac", served as the head football coach of the New Hampshire Wildcats football program from 1999 to 2021. From August 2019 to March 2020, took a leave of absence for medical reasons, with associate head coach Ricky Santos acting as interim head coach for the 2019 season. McDonnell returned to coaching in March 2020. McDonnell announced his retirement on December 1, 2021, at the conclusion of his 30th year as a coach for New Hampshire and 23rd year as head coach of the program.

McDonnell won the Eddie Robinson Award in 2005 and 2014, which is given annually to the top head coach in the NCAA Division I Football Championship Subdivision (FCS). McDonnell ranks third all-time in Colonial Athletic Association (CAA) victories. He ranks second all-time in wins at New Hampshire, only behind the College Football Hall of Fame inductee he once coached under, Bill Bowes. McDonnell is one of 13 FCS coaches with over 150 wins all-time as a head coach, and also had six wins versus Football Bowl Subdivision (FBS) opponents. McDonnell coached as players or had as assistants multiple people who went on to become college football head coaches, including: Ryan Day (Ohio State), Chip Kelly (UCLA), Joe Conlin (Fordham), Tony Trisciani (Elon), Dan Curran (Merrimack), Mike Lichten (University of New England), Ryan Carty (University of Delaware) and his successor at New Hampshire, Ricky Santos. McDonnell has two sons. He lives with his wife in Durham, New Hampshire.

== Head coaching record ==
| Year | Team | Overall | Conference | Standing | Bowl/playoffs | TSN/STATS^{#} |
|---|---|---|---|---|---|---|
New Hampshire Wildcats (Atlantic 10 Conference) (1999–2006)
| 1999 | New Hampshire | 5–6 | 3–5 | T–6th | | |
| 2000 | New Hampshire | 6–5 | 4–4 | T–4th | | |
| 2001 | New Hampshire | 4–7 | 2–7 | 10th | | |
| 2002 | New Hampshire | 3–8 | 2–7 | 10th | | |
| 2003 | New Hampshire | 5–7 | 3–6 | T–8th | | |
| 2004 | New Hampshire | 10–3 | 6–2 | 1st (North) | L NCAA Division I-AA Quarterfinal | 6 |
| 2005 | New Hampshire | 11–2 | 7–1 | T–1st (North) | L NCAA Division I-AA Quarterfinal | 5 |
| 2006 | New Hampshire | 9–4 | 5–3 | T–2nd (North) | L NCAA Division I Quarterfinal | 6 |
| New Hampshire: | | 53–42 | 32–35 | | | |
New Hampshire Wildcats (Colonial Athletic Association) (2007–2018)
| 2007 | New Hampshire | 7–5 | 4–4 | T–2nd (North) | L NCAA Division I First Round | 14 |
| 2008 | New Hampshire | 10–3 | 6–2 | 1st (North) | L NCAA Division I Quarterfinal | 8 |
| 2009 | New Hampshire | 10–3 | 6–2 | 1st (North) | L NCAA Division I Quarterfinal | 10 |
| 2010 | New Hampshire | 8–5 | 5–3 | T–4th | L NCAA Division I Quarterfinal | 7 |
| 2011 | New Hampshire | 8–4 | 6–2 | T–2nd | L NCAA Division I Second Round | 11 |
| 2012 | New Hampshire | 8–4 | 6–2 | T–2nd | L NCAA Division I Second Round | 13 |
| 2013 | New Hampshire | 10–5 | 6–2 | T–2nd | L NCAA Division I Semifinal | 5 |
| 2014 | New Hampshire | 12–2 | 8–0 | 1st | L NCAA Division I Semifinal | 3 |
| 2015 | New Hampshire | 7–5 | 5–3 | T–4th | L NCAA Division I First Round | |
| 2016 | New Hampshire | 8–5 | 6–2 | T–2nd | L NCAA Division I Second Round | 17 |
| 2017 | New Hampshire | 9–5 | 5–3 | T–4th | L NCAA Division I Quarterfinal | |
| 2018 | New Hampshire | 4–7 | 3–5 | 9th | | |
New Hampshire Wildcats (Colonial Athletic Association) (2020–2021)
| 2020–21 | New Hampshire | 0–1 | 0–1 | 7th (North) (Note: Due to the COVID-19 pandemic, New Hampshire was limited to a single game during the 2020 football season, contested in the Spring of 2021.) | | |
| 2021 | New Hampshire | 3–8 | 2–6 | 11th | | |
| New Hampshire: | | 157–104 | 100–72 | | | |
| Total: | | 157–104 | | | | |
National championship Conference title Conference division title or championship game berth
^{#}Rankings from final The Sports Network / STAT Poll.
