= 2020 New Hampshire Wildcats football team =

American college football season

2020 New Hampshire Wildcats football
- Conference: Colonial Athletic Association
- North Division
- Record: 0–1 (0–1 CAA)
- Head coach: Sean McDonnell (21st season)
- Co-offensive coordinators: Michael Ferzoco (2nd season); Alex Miller (2nd season)
- Defensive coordinator: John Lyons (10th season)
- Home stadium: Wildcat Stadium

2020 Colonial Athletic Association football standings
	Conf.			Overall
Team	W		L	W		L
North Division
No. 4 Delaware x$^	4	–	0	7	–	1
No. 18 Rhode Island †	2	–	1	2	–	1
No. 16 Villanova	2	–	2	2	–	2
Maine	2	–	2	2	–	2
Stony Brook	1	–	3	1	–	3
Albany †	1	–	3	1	–	3
New Hampshire †	0	–	1	0	–	1
South Division
No. 3 James Madison x^	3	–	0	7	–	1
No. 15 Richmond	3	–	1	3	–	1
William & Mary	1	–	2	1	–	2
Elon	0	–	4	1	–	5
$ – Conference champion; x – Division champion/co-champions; ^ – FCS playoff participant; Notes: Due to COVID-19, the CAA suspended the fall 2020 football season. Towson opted out of the spring football season. † – Albany, New Hampshire, and Rhode Island opted out of the remainder of the spring season on March 31, April 6, and April 7 respectively.; Rankings from STATS Poll

The 2020 New Hampshire Wildcats football team represented the University of New Hampshire in the 2020–21 NCAA Division I FCS football season. The team was led by 21st-year head coach Sean McDonnell following his leave of absence for medical reasons during the 2019 season. The Wildcats have played their home football games at Wildcat Stadium since 1936, and have competed in college football as an associate member of the Colonial Athletic Association (CAA) since 2007.

On July 17, 2020, the CAA announced that it would not play fall sports due to the COVID-19 pandemic. The conference gave teams the option to play as independents for the 2020 season if they still wished to play in the fall. The same day, the university announced a postponement of their fall sports season, stating that they were "pursuing the feasibility of moving the fall sport programs to a spring season." In October 2020, the CAA announced a football schedule for teams to play in the spring of 2021.

The Wildcats began their spring football season on March 5, 2021, with a home loss to Albany. Their next three games were postponed due to COVID concerns, and on April 6, the program opted out of the remainder of the season.

== Schedule ==
The CAA released its spring conference schedule on October 27, 2020.

Date	Time	Opponent	Rank	Site	TV	Result	Attendance	Source
March 5, 2021	7:00 p.m.	No. 13 Albany	No. 14	Wildcat Stadium; Durham, NH	FloFootball	L 20–24	0	
March 20, 2021	12:00 p.m.	No. 12 Delaware	No. 20	Wildcat Stadium; Durham, NH	FloFootball	Canceled		
March 27, 2021	1:00 p.m.	at No. 16 Villanova	No. 24	Villanova Stadium; Villanova, PA	FloFootball	Canceled		
April 3, 2021	1:00 p.m.	at No. 22 Rhode Island		Meade Stadium; Kingston, RI	FloFootball	Canceled		
April 10, 2021	12:00 p.m.	Stony Brook		Wildcat Stadium; Durham, NH	FloFootball	Canceled		
April 17, 2021	2:00 p.m.	at Maine		Alfond Stadium; Orono, ME (Battle for the Brice-Cowell Musket)	FloFootball	Canceled		
Rankings from STATS Poll released prior to the game; All times are in Eastern time

== Game summaries ==
=== Albany ===
	1	2	3	4	Total
Great Danes	7	0	14	3	24
Wildcats	7	7	0	6	20

This was the first game of the delayed 2020 season for both New Hampshire and Albany. New Hampshire entered the game ranked 14th, while Albany was ranked 13th. Albany had won the teams' most recent meeting, 24–17, played in November 2019 in Albany.

First quarter

- (7:59) UNH – Sean Coyne 4-yard pass from Max Brosmer, Jordan Conn kick (Drive: 14 plays, 68 yards, 6:55; UNH 7–0)
- (1:21) ALB – Mike Gray 23-yard pass from Jeff Undercuffler, Dylan Burns kick (Drive: 14 plays, 75 yards, 6:38; Tied 7–7)

Second quarter

- (1:08) UNH – Albany punt blocked by Zedane Williams, recovered by J. J. Jerome in the end zone, Jordan Conn kick (UNH 14–7)

Third quarter

- (10:36) ALB – Tyler Oedekoven 18-yard pass from Jeff Undercuffler, Dylan Burns kick (Drive: 11 plays, 74 yards, 4:21; Tied 14–14)
- (7:41) ALB – Karl Mofor 9-yard pass from Jeff Undercuffler, Dylan Burns kick (Drive: 6 plays, 22 yards, 2:14; ALB 21–14)

Fourth quarter

- (11:38) ALB – Dylan Burns 37-yard field goal (Drive: 12 plays, 54 yards, 5:22; ALB 24–14)
- (6:48) UNH – Sean Coyne 18-yard pass from Max Brosmer, kick blocked (Drive: 2 plays, 25 yards, 0:47; ALB 24–20)
