= Nick Charlton =

American football coach (born 1988)

Washington Commanders
- Title: Offensive assistant

Personal information
- Born: December 20, 1988 (age 37); Virginia Beach, Virginia, U.S.

Career information
- College: Boston College (2011)

Career history
- Boston College Eagles (2012); Recruiting graduate assistant (2012); Offensive graduate assistant (2013–2014); Maine Black Bears (2015–2021); Wide receivers coach (2015); Special teams & wide receivers coach (2016–2017); Offensive coordinator (2018); Head coach (2019–2021); UConn Huskies (2022–2023); Offensive coordinator (2022–2023); Cleveland Browns (2024–2025); Run game specialist (2024); Pass game specialist (2025); Washington Commanders (2026–present); Offensive assistant (2026–present)

Head coaching record
- Career: 14–13

Nick Charlton (born December 20, 1988) is an American professional football coach who is an offensive assistant for the Washington Commanders of the National Football League (NFL). Charlton previously served as the head coach of the Maine Black Bears college football team from 2019 to 2021.

== Career ==
Charlton grew up in Salem, Massachusetts. He earned a B.A. in philosophy from Boston College in 2011 and a M.A. from Boston College's Woods College of Advancing Studies in 2013. During his lone season as Maine's offensive coordinator, the team went to the semifinals of the NCAA FCS Playoffs, the farthest Maine has advanced in team history. Charlton succeeded Joe Harasymiak, who left for an assistant coaching position at the University of Minnesota. Charlton was hired two days after his 30th birthday. Following the 2021 season, it was announced that Charlton would leave Maine to become the offensive coordinator on Jim L. Mora's inaugural staff at UConn.

Following two seasons at UConn, on March 13, 2024, Charlton accepted a position with the Cleveland Browns as an offensive assistant. On February 15, 2025, the Browns shifted Charlton's role to pass game specialist.

== Head coaching record ==
| Year | Team | Overall | Conference | Standing | Bowl/playoffs |
|---|---|---|---|---|---|
Maine Black Bears (Colonial Athletic Association) (2019–2021)
| 2019 | Maine | 6–6 | 4–4 | T–5th | |
| 2020–21 | Maine | 2–2 | 2–2 | T–3rd (North) | |
| 2021 | Maine | 6–5 | 4–4 | T–4th | |
| Maine: | | 14–13 | 10–10 | | |
| Total: | | 14–13 | | | |
