= 2020 Delaware State Hornets football team =

American college football season

2020 Delaware State Hornets football
- Conference: Mid-Eastern Athletic Conference
- Record: 2–3 (2–2 MEAC)
- Head coach: Rod Milstead (3rd season)
- Offensive coordinator: Steve Azzanesi (1st season)
- Home stadium: Alumni Stadium

2020 Mid-Eastern Athletic Conference football standings
	Conf.			Overall
Team	W		L	W		L
North Division
Delaware State	2	–	2	2	–	3
Howard*	0	–	2	0	–	2
South Division
South Carolina State	2	–	0	3	–	1
Notes: Due to COVID-19, the Mid-Eastern Athletic suspended the fall 2020 football season. Florida A&M, Bethune–Cookman, North Carolina Central, North Carolina A&T, Morgan State, and Norfolk State opted out of the spring season. The MEAC suspended the spring season on February 11, due to only having three schools playing in the spring. * – Ineligible for FCS postseason play due to NCAA sanctions; Rankings from STATS Poll

The 2020 Delaware State Hornets football team represented Delaware State University in the 2020–21 NCAA Division I FCS football season. They were led by third-year head coach Rod Milstead and played their home games at Alumni Stadium. They were a member of the Mid-Eastern Athletic Conference (MEAC).

On July 16, 2020, the MEAC announced that it would cancel its fall sports seasons due to the COVID-19 pandemic. The league did not rule out the possibility of playing in the spring, and later released its spring schedule on December 14, 2020.

== Schedule ==
Date	Time	Opponent	Site	TV	Result	Attendance
February 27	12:00 p.m.	Howard	Alumni Stadium; Dover, DE	ESPN3	W 17–10	
March 13	1:30 p.m.	at South Carolina State	Oliver C. Dawson Stadium; Orangeburg, SC	ESPN3	L 9–17	
April 3	1:00 p.m.	at Howard	William H. Greene Stadium; Washington, D.C.	ESPN3	W 37–28	
April 10	6:00 p.m.	No. 8 Delaware*	Alumni Stadium; Dover, DE (Route 1 Rivalry)	ESPN2	L 14–34	
April 17	6:00 p.m.	South Carolina State	Alumni Stadium; Dover, DE	ESPN3	L 28–31^{OT}	
*Non-conference game; Rankings from STATS Poll released prior to the game; All times are in Eastern time
