= Ryan Coll =

American football player (born 2001)

Profile
- Position: Tackle

Personal information
- Born: February 21, 2001 (age 25); Gainesville, Virginia, U.S.
- Listed height: 6 ft 5 in (1.96 m)
- Listed weight: 324 lb (147 kg)

Career information
- High school: Battlefield (Haymarket, Virginia)
- College: Richmond (2019−2023)
- NFL draft: 2024: undrafted

Career history
- Atlanta Falcons (2024)*; Indianapolis Colts (2024); Toronto Argonauts (2025)*; St. Louis Battlehawks (2025−2026)
- * Offseason or practice squad member only

Awards and highlights
- Second-team FCS All-American (2022); Third-team FCS All-American (2023); 2× First-team All-CAA (2022, 2023)
- Stats at Pro Football Reference

Ryan Coll (born February 21, 2001) is an American professional football tackle. He played college football for the Richmond Spiders.

== Early life ==
Coll was a defensive lineman and tight end at Battlefield High School, where he earned first-team all-state honors as a senior. He was recruited to Richmond as an offensive lineman.

== College career ==
Coll majored in rhetoric and communications at the University of Richmond. As a freshman in 2019 at Richmond, Coll played in twelve games, primarily at tight end. His 2020 season ended in an injury after one game. He started in six games in 2021. In 2022 he started in all thirteen games, earning second-team FCS All-American and first-team All-CAA honors. He again started all thirteen games in 2023, and was named to the third-team FCS All-American team as well as another first-team All-CAA nomination.

== Professional career ==
Pre-draft measurables
Height	Weight	Arm length	Hand span	40-yard dash	10-yard split	20-yard split	20-yard shuttle	Three-cone drill	Vertical jump	Broad jump	Bench press
6 ft 5 1/4 in (1.96 m)	308 lb (140 kg)	32 1/4 in (0.82 m)	10 3/8 in (0.26 m)	5.26 s	1.82 s	3.14 s	4.58 s	7.53 s	32 in (0.81 m)	9 ft 4 in (2.84 m)	27 reps
All values from Pro Day

=== Atlanta Falcons ===
Though he played offensive tackle in college, National Football League (NFL) scouts considered Coll a prospect at center. After going undrafted in the 2024 NFL draft, Coll agreed to terms with the Atlanta Falcons on April 27, 2024, and signed on April 30 as an undrafted free agent. He was waived on July 24.

=== Indianapolis Colts ===
On August 7, 2024, Coll signed with the Indianapolis Colts. He was placed on injured reserve on August 19 with an undisclosed injury, ending his 2024 season. On March 5, 2025, Coll was waived by the Colts.

=== St. Louis Battlehawks ===
After being waived by the Colts, Coll signed with the Toronto Argonauts of the Canadian Football League (CFL), but was quickly released so he could sign with the St. Louis Battlehawks of the United Football League (UFL) on March 6, 2025. The Battlehawks listed him as a tackle on the team's roster after signing him. He was released on May 27.
