= Greg Gattuso =

American football player and coach (born 1962)

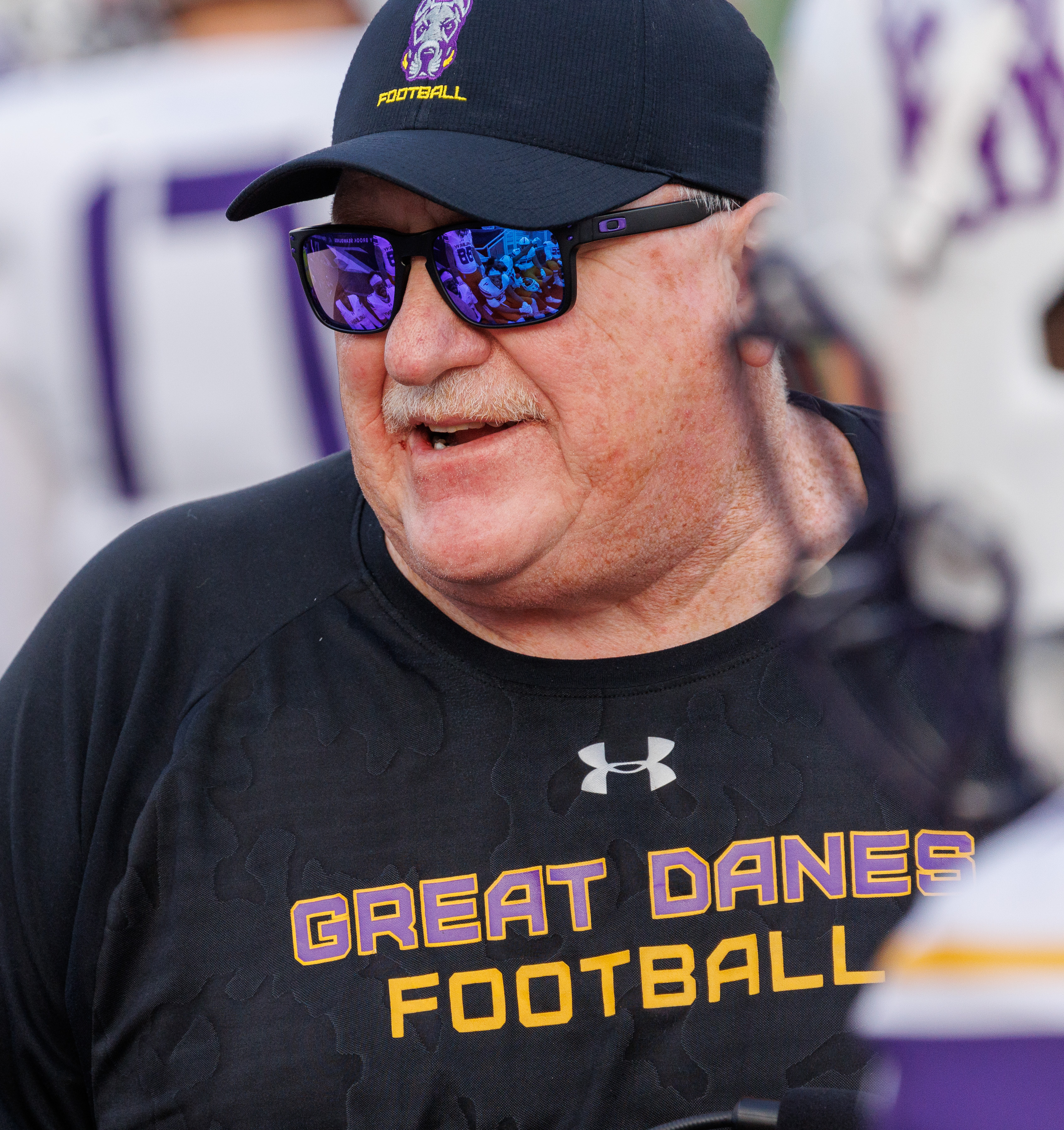
- Gattuso in 2023

Current position
- Title: Senior defensive analyst
- Team: Penn State
- Conference: Big Ten

Biographical details
- Born: May 18, 1962 (age 64); Pittsburgh, Pennsylvania, U.S.

Playing career
- 1981–1983: Penn State
- Position: Defensive lineman

Coaching career (HC unless noted)
- 1984: Penn State (GA)
- 1985: Seton-La Salle HS (PA) (JV)
- 1986: Center Township HS (PA) (DC)
- 1987: Duquesne (DL)
- 1989–1991: Seton-La Salle HS (PA)
- 1992: Duquesne (DC)
- 1993–2004: Duquesne
- 2005: Pittsburgh (TE/RC)
- 2006–2007: Pittsburgh (DL)
- 2008–2010: Pittsburgh (AHC/DL)
- 2011: Maryland (DL)
- 2012–2013: Maryland (AHC/DL)
- 2014–2024: Albany
- 2025–present: Penn State (SDA)

Head coaching record
- Overall: 151–101 (college); 28–10–1 (high school)
- Bowls: 2–3
- Tournaments: 3–2 (NCAA D-I playoffs)

Accomplishments and honors

Championships
- 1 Consensus mid-major national (2003); 8 MAAC (1995–1996, 1999–2004); 1 CAA (2023)

Awards
- 2× Second-team All-East (1982, 1983)

Gregory Gattuso (born May 18, 1962) is an American football coach and former player. He is currently a defensive line consultant at his alma mater, Pennsylvania State University, serving under new defensive coordinator Jim Knowles. Gattuso served as the head coach of University of Albany from 2014 to 2024. He was formerly the defensive line coach at the University of Maryland, under head coach Randy Edsall, a position he assumed in January 2011. Gattuso served as the head coach at Duquesne University from 1993 to 2004, compiling a record of 97–32. From 2005 to 2010, he was an assistant coach at the University of Pittsburgh.

== Head coaching record ==
=== College ===
Year	Team	Overall	Conference	Standing	Bowl/playoffs	TSN/STATS^{#}	Coaches^{°}
Duquesne Dukes (NCAA Division I-AA independent) (1993)
1993	Duquesne	4–6					
Duquesne Dukes (Metro Atlantic Athletic Conference) (1994–2004)
1994	Duquesne	6–4	4–3	3rd			
1995	Duquesne	10–1	7–0	1st	W ECAC		
1996	Duquesne	10–1	8–0	1st	L ECAC		
1997	Duquesne	7–3	6–1	2nd			
1998	Duquesne	8–3	5–2	3rd			
1999	Duquesne	8–3	6–1	1st			
2000	Duquesne	10–1	8–0	1st			
2001	Duquesne	8–3	6–0	1st	L ECAC		
2002	Duquesne	11–1	8–0	1st	L ECAC		
2003	Duquesne	8–3	5–0	1st	W ECAC		
2004	Duquesne	7–3	4–0	1st			
Duquesne:		97–32	67–7				
Albany Great Danes (Colonial Athletic Association) (2014–2022)
2014	Albany	7–5	3–5	9th			
2015	Albany	3–8	2–6	11th			
2016	Albany	7–4	4–4	T–6th			
2017	Albany	4–7	2–6	T–10th			
2018	Albany	3–8	1–7	12th			
2019	Albany	9–5	6–2	2nd	L NCAA Division I Second Round	18	20
2020–21	Albany	1–3 (Note: Albany opted out of the remainder of the spring season due to COVID-19 concerns.)	1–3	T–5th (North)			
2021	Albany	2–9	1–7	12th			
2022	Albany	3–8	2–6	T–10th			
Albany Great Danes (Coastal Athletic Association Football Conference) (2023–present)
2023	Albany	11–4	7–1	T–1st	L NCAA Division I Semifinal	9	15
2024	Albany	4–8	2–6	T–12th			
Albany:		54–69	30–53				
Total:		151–101					
National championship Conference title Conference division title or championship game berth
