= James Madison–Richmond football rivalry =

American college football rivalry

- James Madison Dukes Richmond Spiders
- Sport: Football
- First meeting: October 3, 1981; Richmond, 24–7
- Latest meeting: October 16, 2021; James Madison, 19–3

Statistics
- Total meetings: 39
- All-time series: James Madison, 21–18
- Largest victory: James Madison, 63–10 (2018)
- Longest win streak: James Madison, 6 (2016–present)
- Current win streak: James Madison, 6 (2016–present)

Locations of James Madison and Richmond

The James Madison–Richmond football rivalry is an American college football rivalry between the James Madison Dukes and the Richmond Spiders. Previously, it was a divisional game in the South division of the Colonial Athletic Association, and conference game in the Yankee Conference and Atlantic 10 beginning with the Dukes entry in 1993. During this period, the teams have combined for three National Championships (James Madison in 2004 and 2016, Richmond in 2008) and fourteen Conference Championships (James Madison in 1998, 2004, 2008, 2015, 2016, 2017, 2019; Richmond in 1998, 2000, 2005, 2007, 2009, 2012, 2015). All of James Madison's home games have been hosted at Bridgeforth Stadium in Harrisonburg, Virginia while Richmond hosted its contests at City Stadium until 2009, and from 2010 onward at Robins Stadium, both in Richmond, Virginia; as of 2016, only one game has been played on a neutral field, a 1985 matchup in Norfolk, Virginia. The rivalry has become increasingly intense over the years, likely due to the stark differences between the two institutions (Large Public School vs. Small Private School), and the continued success of both programs.

On October 24, 2015, the rivalry played host to ESPN College Gameday, as the show was broadcast from the campus of James Madison University before the two teams squared off. The result of the game was the highest scoring affair to date, with the Spiders beating the Dukes 59–49.

One interesting note in this matchup is the frequency with which the visiting team wins the contest. In the 27 games these teams have played as conference rivals, the visiting team has won 15 times, including 5 consecutive years from 1993–1997, 6 consecutive years from 2004–2009, and another 3 consecutive years from 2014–2016.

The two teams met again on September 29, 2018, marking the 27th consecutive season they have played as conference foes, and the 33rd consecutive season overall. James Madison, ranked #2 in the FCS, won by a score of 48–6. With the victory Madison took the all-time series lead, having won 19 of the 37 matchups between the two.

The rivalry will likely go on hiatus after James Madison announced it would elevate its program to Division I FBS for the 2022 season.

== Game results ==
James Madison victories	Richmond victories

No.	Date	Location	Winner	Score
1	October 3, 1981	Richmond, VA	Richmond	24–7
2	November 5, 1983	Richmond, VA	Richmond	32–0
3	September 1, 1984	Harrisonburg, VA	Richmond	43–12
4	October 5, 1985	Norfolk, VA	Richmond	38–15
5	October 10, 1987	Harrisonburg, VA	James Madison	41–3
6	November 12, 1988	Richmond, VA	James Madison	25–13
7	September 16, 1989	Harrisonburg, VA	James Madison	31–0
8	September 22, 1990	Richmond, VA	James Madison	29–0
9	October 26, 1991	Harrisonburg, VA	James Madison	47–42
10	September 12, 1992	Richmond, VA	Richmond	49–40
11	September 11, 1993	Harrisonburg, VA	Richmond	20–13
12	October 29, 1994	Richmond, VA	James Madison	29–16
13	October 28, 1995	Harrisonburg, VA	Richmond	34–33
14	October 19, 1996	Richmond, VA	James Madison	31–27
15	October 25, 1997	Harrisonburg, VA	Richmond	26–21
16	October 3, 1998	Richmond, VA	Richmond	28–7
17	November 13, 1999	Harrisonburg, VA	James Madison	31–13
18	November 11, 2000	Richmond, VA	Richmond	21–2
19	October 12, 2001	Harrisonburg, VA	Richmond	20–17
20	October 19, 2002	Richmond, VA	Richmond	26–0

No.	Date	Location	Winner	Score
21	October 11, 2003	Harrisonburg, VA	James Madison	34–14
22	October 23, 2004	Richmond, VA	James Madison	26–20
23	October 29, 2005	Harrisonburg, VA	Richmond	18–15
24	October 28, 2006	Richmond, VA	James Madison	27–20
25	October 27, 2007	Harrisonburg, VA	Richmond	17–16
26	October 11, 2008	Richmond, VA	James Madison	38–31
27	October 10, 2009	Harrisonburg, VA	Richmond	21–17
28	November 6, 2010	Richmond, VA	Richmond	13–10^{OT}
29	October 1, 2011	Harrisonburg, VA	James Madison	31–7
30	October 20, 2012	Richmond, VA	Richmond	35–29
31	October 12, 2013	Harrisonburg, VA	James Madison	38–31
32	November 15, 2014	Richmond, VA	James Madison	55–20
33	October 24, 2015	Harrisonburg, VA	Richmond	59–49
34	November 5, 2016	Richmond, VA	James Madison	47–43
35	November 11, 2017	Harrisonburg, VA	James Madison	20–13
36	September 29, 2018	Richmond, VA	James Madison	63–10
37	November 16, 2019	Harrisonburg, VA	James Madison	48–6
38	April 17, 2021	Harrisonburg, VA	James Madison	23–6
39	October 16, 2021	Richmond, VA	James Madison	19–3
Series: James Madison leads 21–18

== See also ==
- List of NCAA college football rivalry games
