= Jim Fleming (American football) =

American football player and coach (born 1959)

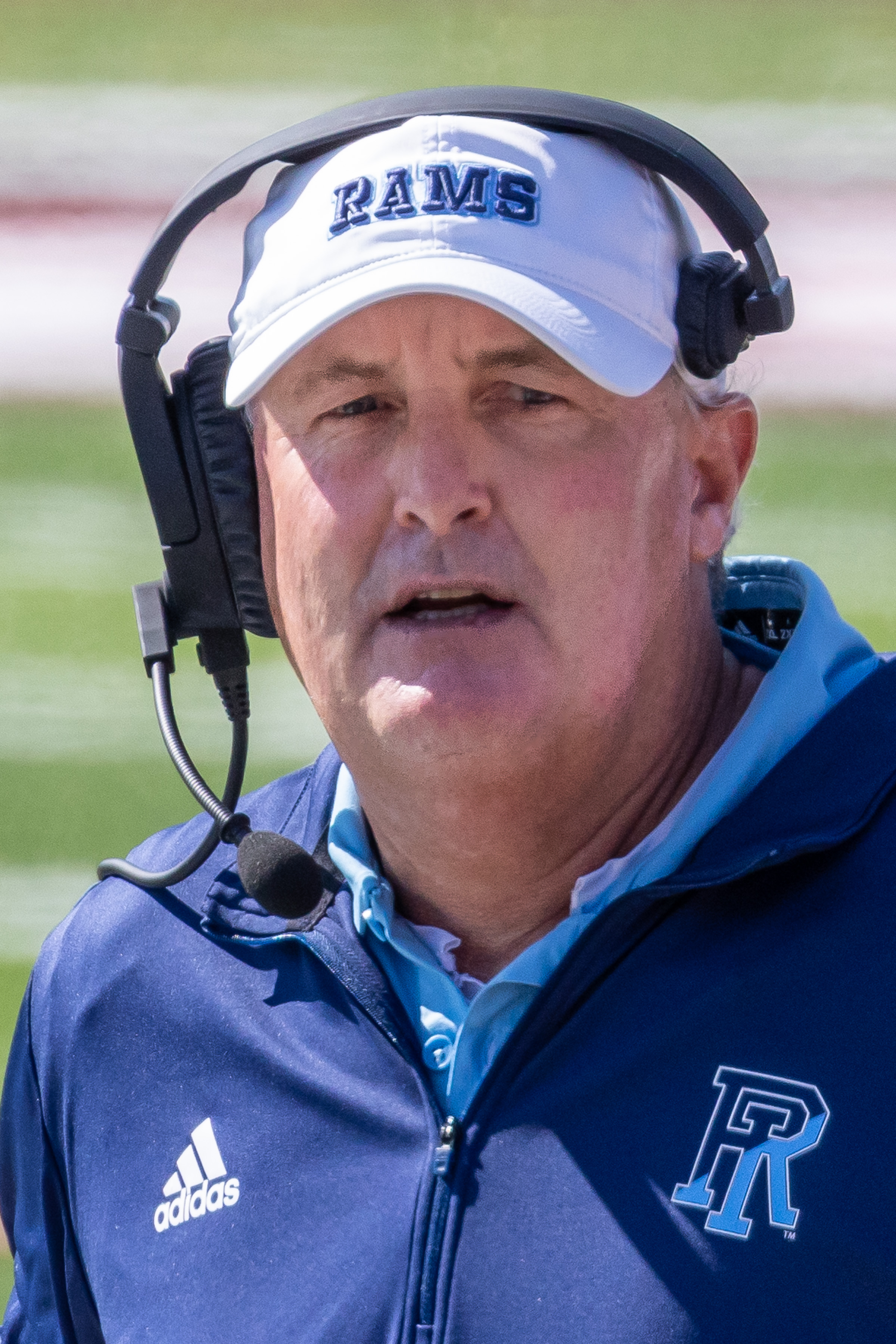
- Fleming in 2021

Current position
- Title: Head coach
- Team: Rhode Island
- Conference: CAA
- Record: 64–77

Biographical details
- Born: September 23, 1959 (age 67); New York, New York, U.S.

Playing career
- 1978–1981: Sewanee
- Position: Tight end

Coaching career (HC unless noted)
- 1985–1986: South Carolina (GA)
- 1987–1988: Boise State (TE/WR)
- 1989: Boise State (DB)
- 1990–1992: Boise State (DC)
- 1993: Brown (DC)
- 1994: East Carolina (OLB)
- 1995–1997: East Carolina (DB)
- 1998–1999: Villanova (DC/DB)
- 2000–2001: Sacred Heart
- 2002: North Carolina (DB/STC)
- 2003: North Carolina (DB)
- 2004–2009: Akron (DC/SAF)
- 2010: Kent State (LB)
- 2012–2013: UCF (DC)
- 2014–present: Rhode Island

Head coaching record
- Overall: 85–78
- Bowls: 1–0
- Tournaments: 2–2 (NCAA D-I Playoffs)

Accomplishments and honors

Championships
- NEC (2001); Mid-Major National (2001); 2x CAA (2024, 2025)

Awards
- 2× NEC Coach of the Year (2000–2001); Division I-AA Region I Coach of the Year

Jim Fleming (born September 23, 1959) is an American college football coach and former player. He is currently the head coach at the University of Rhode Island (URI), a position he assumed in December 2013. Fleming served in the same capacity at Sacred Heart University (SHU) from 2000 to 2001 where he compiled a record of 21 wins and one loss. Prior to his appointment at URI, he was the defensive coordinator at the University of Central Florida (UCF) from 2012 to 2013.

== Coaching career ==
Fleming served as the head coach for two seasons at Sacred Heart University from 2000 to 2001 and compiled an overall record of 21–1. He led the Pioneers to the program's first conference title in 2001 and first bowl appearance/win, also in 2001. His 2001 Pioneer team also was crowned as the Mid-Major National Champs after defeating Duquesne University.

The University of Rhode Island announced on December 20, 2013, that it had hired Fleming as the 20th football head coach in school history.

== Head coaching record ==
Year	Team	Overall	Conference	Standing	Bowl/playoffs	STATS^{#}	Coaches^{°}
Sacred Heart Pioneers (Northeast Conference) (2000–2001)
2000	Sacred Heart	10–1	7–1	2nd			
2001	Sacred Heart	11–0	8–0	1st	W ECAC		
Sacred Heart:		21–1	15–1				
Rhode Island Rams (Colonial Athletic Association) (2014–2022)
2014	Rhode Island	1–11	1–7	11th			
2015	Rhode Island	1–10	1–7	12th			
2016	Rhode Island	2–9	1–7	T–11th			
2017	Rhode Island	3–8	2–6	T–10th			
2018	Rhode Island	6–5	4–4	7th			
2019	Rhode Island	2–10	0–8	12th			
2020–21	Rhode Island	2–1	2–1	2nd (North)		18	24
2021	Rhode Island	7–4	4–4	T–4th			
2022	Rhode Island	7–4	5–3	5th			
Rhode Island Rams (Coastal Athletic Association Football Conference) (2023–present)
2023	Rhode Island	6–5	4–4	T–7th			
2024	Rhode Island	11–3	7–1	T–1st	L NCAA Division I Second Round	9	11
2025	Rhode Island	11–3	8–0	1st	L NCAA Division I Second Round	11	10
2026	Rhode Island	5–4	2–3				
Rhode Island:		64–77	41–55				
Total:		85–78					
National championship Conference title Conference division title or championship game berth
