= Mark Ferrante =

American football player and coach (born 1961)

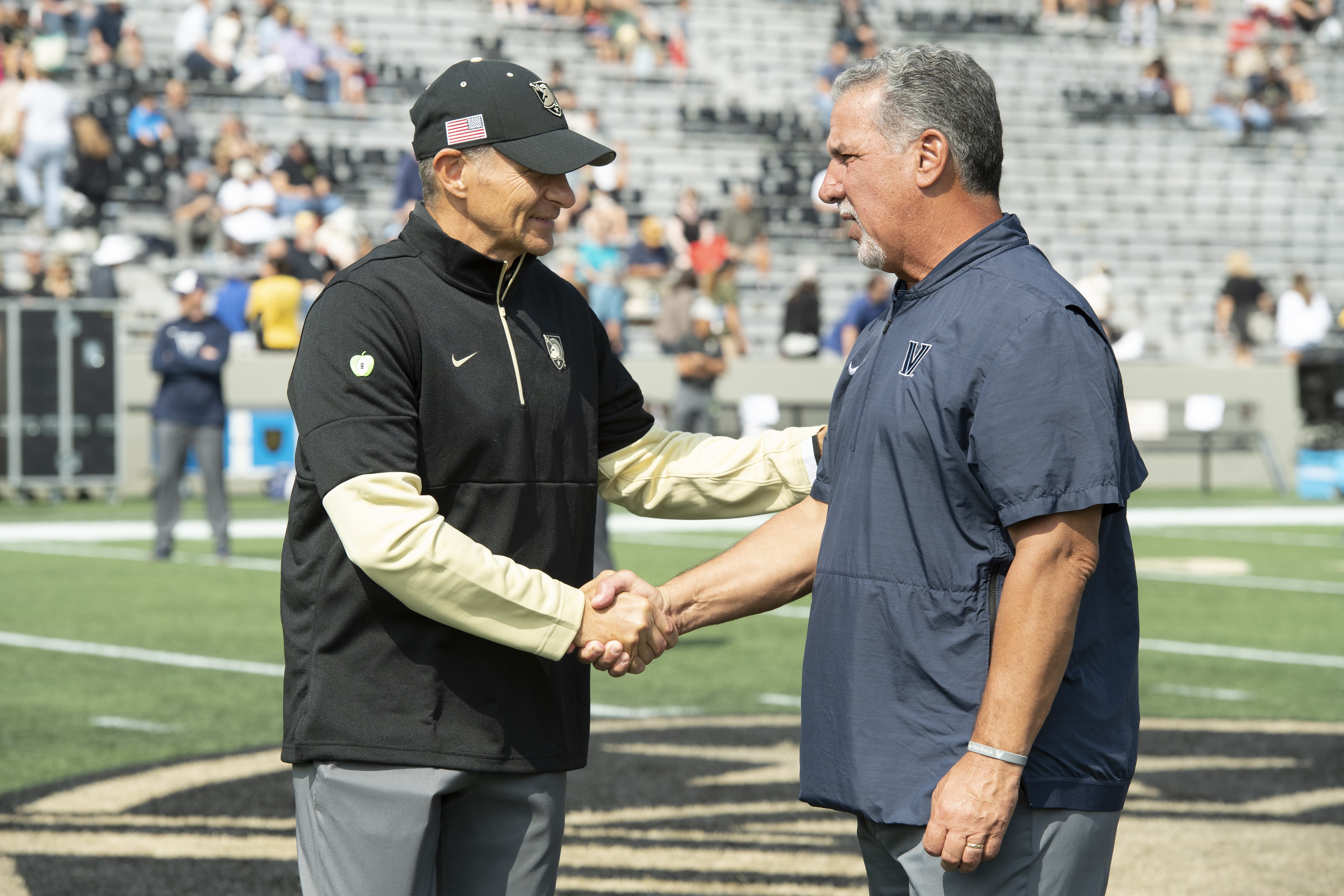
- Ferrante (right) shakes hands with Jeff Monken before a September 2022 Villanova game against Army

Current position
- Title: Head coach
- Team: Villanova
- Conference: Patriot League
- Record: 75–40

Biographical details
- Born: May 30, 1961 (age 65)

Playing career
- 1978–1982: St. Lawrence
- Position: Quarterback

Coaching career (HC unless noted)
- 1983: St. Lawrence (RB)
- 1984: Wagner (RB)
- 1985–1986: Lafayette (RB)
- 1987–1988: Villanova (OLB)
- 1989–1998: Villanova (OL)
- 1998–2016: Villanova (AHC/OL)
- 2017–present: Villanova

Head coaching record
- Overall: 75–40
- Tournaments: 6–5 (NCAA D-I playoffs)

Accomplishments and honors

Championships
- 2 CAA (2021, 2023)

Mark Ferrante (born May 30, 1961) is an American college football coach. He is the head football coach at Villanova University, a position he has held since 2017.

Ferrante initially joined the Villanova staff in 1987 as the team's outside linebackers coach, he took over as the offensive line coach prior to the 1989 season.

== Head coaching record ==
Year	Team	Overall	Conference	Standing	Bowl/playoffs	STATS^{#}	Coaches^{°}
Villanova Wildcats (Colonial Athletic Association) (2017–2022)
2017	Villanova	5–6	3–5	T–7th			
2018	Villanova	5–6	2–6	T–10th			
2019	Villanova	9–4	5–3	T–3rd	L NCAA Division I First Round	15	15
2020–21	Villanova	2–2	2–2	T–3rd (North)			
2021	Villanova	10–3	7–1	T–1st	L NCAA Division I Quarterfinal	8	8
2022	Villanova	6–5	4–4	T–6th			
Villanova Wildcats (Coastal Athletic Association Football Conference) (2023–2025)
2023	Villanova	10–3	7–1	T–1st	L NCAA Division I Quarterfinal	6	6
2024	Villanova	10–4	6–2	T–3rd	L NCAA Division I Second Round	12	9
2025	Villanova	12–3	7–1	2nd	L NCAA Division I Semifinal	4	4
Villanova Wildcats (Patriot League) (2026–present)
2026	Villanova	6–4	5–2				
Villanova:		75–40	48–26				
Total:		75–40					
