= Tony Trisciani =

American football player and coach (born 1973)

Current position
- Title: Head coach
- Team: Elon
- Conference: CAA
- Record: 39–37

Biographical details
- Born: April 24, 1973 (age 53)

Playing career
- 1992–1995: Springfield

Coaching career (HC unless noted)
- 1996–1997: Springfield (GA)
- 1998–1999: New Hampshire (RB)
- 2000: Alfred (OC/QB/WR)
- 2001–2004: New Hampshire (DB)
- 2005: Lehigh (LB)
- 2006: Elon (DB/ST)
- 2007–2011: Whitehall HS (PA)
- 2012–2016: Villanova (DB/RC)
- 2017–2018: Elon (DC)
- 2019–present: Elon

Head coaching record
- Overall: 39–37 (college); 37–22 (high school)
- Tournaments: 0–1 (NCAA D-I playoffs)

Tony Trisciani (born April 24, 1973) is an American football coach and former player. He is the head football coach at Elon University in Elon, North Carolina a position he has held since the 2019 season. Before becoming head coach, Trisciani was the defensive coordinator for the Elon Phoenix under head coach Curt Cignetti. Trisciani also served as the defensive backs coach and special teams coordinator at Elon in 2006. He was named the head coach of Elon on December 17, 2018, after Curt Cignetti resigned to become the head coach at James Madison. Trisciani was the head football coach at Whitehall High School in Whitehall Township, Pennsylvania from 2007 to 2011.

== Head coaching record ==
=== College ===
Year	Team	Overall	Conference	Standing	Bowl/playoffs	STATS^{#}	Coaches^{°}
Elon Phoenix (Colonial Athletic Association) (2019–2022)
2019	Elon	5–6	4–4	T–5th			
2020–21	Elon	1–5	0–4	4th (South)			
2021	Elon	6–5	5–3	3rd			
2022	Elon	8–4	6–2	T–2nd	L NCAA Division I First Round	17	18
Elon Phoenix (Coastal Athletic Association Football Conference) (2023–present)
2023	Elon	6–5	6–2	T–4th			
2024	Elon	6–6	5–3	T–6th			
2025	Elon	6–6	4–4	T–7th			
2026	Elon	1–0	0–0				
Elon:		39–37	30–22				
Total:		39–37					

=== High school ===
Year	Team	Overall	Conference	Standing	Bowl/playoffs
Whitehall Zephyrs () (2007–2011)
2007	Whitehall	8–4	7–3	3rd	
2008	Whitehall	4–6	3–6	9th	
2009	Whitehall	7–5	4–5	7th	
2010	Whitehall	10–3	7–2	4th	
2011	Whitehall	8–4	6–3	5th	
Whitehall:		37–22	27–19		
Total:		37–22			
