= 2020 NCAA Division I FCS football rankings =

Rankings for the 2020 NCAA Division I FCS football season

- Season: 2020
- Postseason: Single-elimination
- Preseason No. 1: North Dakota State
- National champions: Sam Houston State
- Conference with most teams in final poll: CAA, MVFC (5)

The 2020 National Collegiate Athletic Association (NCAA) Division I Football Championship Subdivision (FCS) football rankings consists of two human polls, in addition to various publications' preseason polls. Unlike the Football Bowl Subdivision (FBS), college football's governing body, the NCAA, bestows the national championship title through a 24-team tournament. The following weekly polls determine the top 25 teams at the NCAA Division I Football Championship Subdivision level of college football for the 2020 season. The STATS Poll is voted by media members while the Coaches Poll is determined by coaches at the FCS level.

== Legend ==
Legend
	Increase in ranking
	Decrease in ranking
	Not ranked previous week
	Selected for NCAA FCS Playoffs
(Italics)	Number of first place votes
(#–#)	Win–loss record
т	Tied with team above or below also with this symbol

== STATS Poll ==
	Preseason August 25	Week 1 February 22	Week 2 March 1	Week 3 March 8	Week 4 March 15	Week 5 March 22	Week 6 March 29	Week 7 April 5	Week 8 April 12	Week 9 April 19	Final May 17	
1.	North Dakota State (147)	North Dakota State (2–0) (40)	James Madison (2–0) (34)	James Madison (3–0) (29)	James Madison (3–0) (28)	James Madison (3–0) (29)	James Madison (4–0)	James Madison (4–0) (30)	James Madison (4–0) (25)	James Madison (5–0) (30)	Sam Houston State (10–0) (40)	1.
2.	James Madison	James Madison (1–0)	Weber State (1–0) (4)	Weber State (1–0) (2)	North Dakota (4–0) (10)	North Dakota State (5–1) (6)	North Dakota State (5–1)	North Dakota State (5–1) (6)	North Dakota State (6–1) (12)	South Dakota State (5–1) (7)	South Dakota State (8–2)	2.
3.	Northern Iowa	South Dakota State (1–0)	Northern Iowa (1–1)	North Dakota (3–0) (9)	Weber State (2–0) (2)	Weber State (2–0) (2)	Weber State (3–0)	Weber State (4–0) (1)	Weber State (5–0)	Weber State (5–0)	James Madison (7–1)	3.
4.	Weber State	Weber State (0–0)	North Dakota (2–0) (2)	Northern Iowa (2–1)	North Dakota State (4–1)	South Dakota State (4–1) (2)	South Dakota State (4–1)	South Dakota State (4–1) (2)	South Dakota State (4–1) (1)	Sam Houston State (6–0) (3)	Delaware (7–1)	4.
5.	South Dakota State	Northern Iowa (0–1)	Villanova (0–0)	North Dakota State (3–1)	Southern Illinois (4–1)	Sam Houston State (3–0) (1)	Sam Houston State (3–0)	Sam Houston State (4–0) (1)	Sam Houston State (5–0) (2)	Delaware (5–0)	North Dakota State (7–3)	5.
6.	Montana State	Villanova (0–0)	North Dakota State (2–1)	Villanova (1–0)	South Dakota State (3–1)	North Dakota (4–1)	North Dakota (4–1)	North Dakota (4–1)	North Dakota (4–1)	North Dakota State (6–2)	North Dakota (5–2)	6.
7.	Montana	Illinois State (0–0)	Nicholls (2–0)	Nicholls (3–0)	Sam Houston State (3–1)	Jacksonville State (7–1)	Kennesaw State (3–0)	Kennesaw State (4–0)	Delaware (4–0)	North Dakota (4–1)	Jacksonville State (10–3)	7.
8.	Villanova	Kennesaw State (0–0)	South Dakota State (1–1)	South Dakota State (2–1)	Jacksonville State (6–1)	Kennesaw State (3–0)	Delaware (3–0)	Delaware (3–0)	Eastern Washington (5–1)	Jacksonville State (9–2)	Southern Illinois (6–4)	8.
9.	Illinois State	Nicholls (1–0)	Kennesaw State (1–0)	Kennesaw State (1–0)	Kennesaw State (2–0)	Chattanooga (3–1)	Eastern Washington (3–1)	Eastern Washington (4–1)	Jacksonville State (9–2)	Eastern Washington (5–1)	Weber State (5–1)	9.
10.	Kennesaw State	Furman (1–0)	Jacksonville State (4–1)	Southern Illinois (3–1)	Northern Iowa (2–2)	Southern Illinois (4–2)	VMI (5–0)	Jacksonville State (8–2)	Villanova (2–1)	Monmouth (3–0)	Eastern Washington (5–2)	10.
11.	Central Arkansas	Wofford (1–0)	Southern Illinois (2–1)	Jacksonville State (5–1)	Chattanooga (2–1)	Delaware (2–0)	UC Davis (3–1)	Villanova (2–1)	Richmond (3–0)	VMI (6–1)	Monmouth (3–1)	11.
12.	Sacramento State	Eastern Washington (0–0)	Sam Houston State (1–0)	Sam Houston State (1–0)	Delaware (2–0)	Eastern Washington (3–1)	Jacksonville State (7–2)	Richmond (3–0)	Monmouth (3–0)	Missouri State (5–4)	VMI (6–2)	12.
13.	Austin Peay	Albany (0–0)	Albany (0–0)	Albany (1–0)	Furman (3–1)	Incarnate Word (3–0)	Nicholls (4–1)	UC Davis (3–2)	UC Davis (3–2)	UC Davis (3–2)	Missouri State (5–5)	13.
14.	Nicholls	North Dakota (1–0)	New Hampshire (0–0)	Chattanooga (2–1)	Villanova (1–1)	VMI (4–0)	Murray State (5–0)	VMI (5–1)	Missouri State (5–4)	Southern Illinois (5–3)	UC Davis (3–2)	14.
15.	Furman	New Hampshire (0–0)	Illinois State (0–1)	Furman (2–1)	Eastern Washington (2–1)	UC Davis (2–1)	Richmond (3–0)	Missouri State (4–4)	VMI (5–1)	Richmond (3–1)	Richmond (3–1)	15.
16.	Wofford	Jacksonville State (3–1)	Southeast Missouri State (1–1)	Eastern Washington (1–1)	Southeastern Louisiana (2–1)	Villanova (1–1)	Villanova (1–1)	Southern Illinois (4–3)	Kennesaw State (4–1)	Villanova (2–2)	Villanova (2–2)	16.
17.	Albany	Sam Houston State (0–0)	Furman (1–1)	New Hampshire (0–1)	Nicholls (3–1)	Nicholls (3–1)	Chattanooga (3–2)	Murray State (5–1)	Southeastern Louisiana (4–2)	Kennesaw State (4–1)	Kennesaw State (4–1)	17.
18.	Eastern Washington	Southeastern Louisiana (0–0)	Chattanooga (1–1)	Southeastern Louisiana (1–1)	Albany (1–1)	Rhode Island (2–0)	Southern Illinois (4–3)	Nicholls (4–2)	Southern Illinois (4–3)	Rhode Island (2–1)	Murray State (5–2) т	18.
19.	North Carolina A&T	McNeese State (1–0)	Idaho (1–0)	Delaware (1–0)	VMI (3–0)	Murray State (4–0)	Missouri State (4–4)	Incarnate Word (3–1)	Rhode Island (2–1)	Murray State (5–2)	Rhode Island (2–1) т	19.
20.	New Hampshire	Monmouth (0–0)	Wofford (1–1) т	Wofford (1–1)	New Hampshire (0–1)	Furman (3–2)	Incarnate Word (3–1)	Monmouth (2–0)	Murray State (5–2)	Southeastern Louisiana (4–3)	Southeastern Louisiana (4–3)	20.
21.	Southeastern Louisiana	Southeast Missouri State (0–1)	South Dakota (1–0) т	South Dakota (1–1)	UC Davis (1–1)	Richmond (2–0)	Furman (3–2)	East Tennessee State (4–1)	Nicholls (4–3)	Austin Peay (4–5)	East Tennessee State (4–2)	21.
22.	Sam Houston State	Tarleton State (1–1)	Eastern Washington (0–1)	Illinois State (0–2)	Incarnate Word (2–0)	Northern Iowa (2–3)	Rhode Island (2–1)	Rhode Island (2–1)	Austin Peay (4–5)	East Tennessee State (4–2)	Sacred Heart (3–2)	22.
23.	Monmouth	Tennessee Tech (1–0)	Monmouth (0–0)	UC Davis (1–0)	Richmond (2–0)	Southeastern Louisiana (2–2)	Northern Iowa (3–3)	Southeastern Louisiana (3–2)	Mercer (5–5)	Nicholls (4–3)	Austin Peay (4–5)	23.
24.	Southern Illinois	Elon (1–0)	Southeastern Louisiana (0–1)	Monmouth (0–0)	Jackson State (3–0)	New Hampshire (0–1)	Idaho (2–1)	Northern Iowa (3–3)	East Tennessee State (4–2)	Arkansas–Pine Bluff (4–0)	Alabama A&M (5–0)	24.
25.	Southeast Missouri State	Delaware (0–0)	Delaware (0–0)	Incarnate Word (2–0)	Murray State (3–0)	Maine (2–1)	Southeastern Louisiana (2–2)	Duquesne (4–0)т Austin Peay (4–5)т	Incarnate Word (3–2)	Northern Iowa (3–4)	Nicholls State (4–3)	25.
	Preseason August 25	Week 1 February 22	Week 2 March 1	Week 3 March 8	Week 4 March 15	Week 5 March 22	Week 6 March 29	Week 7 April 5	Week 8 April 12	Week 9 April 19	Final May 17	
		Dropped: No. 6 Montana State (Note: Opted out of the spring season.); No. 7 Montana; No. 11 Central Arkansas; No. 12 Sacramento State; No. 13 Austin Peay; No. 19 North Carolina A&T; No. 24 Southern Illinois	Dropped: No. 19 McNeese State; No. 22 Tarleton State; No. 23 Tennessee Tech; No. 24 Elon	Dropped: No. 16 Southeast Missouri State; No. 19 Idaho	Dropped: No. 20 Wofford; No. 21 South Dakota; No. 22 Illinois State; No. 24 Monmouth	Dropped: No. 18 Albany; No. 24 Jackson State	Dropped: No. 24 New Hampshire; No. 25 Maine	Dropped: No. 17 Chattanooga; No. 21 Furman; No. 24 Idaho	Dropped: No. 24 Northern Iowa; No. 25 Duquesne	Dropped: No. 23 Mercer; No. 25 Incarnate Word	Dropped: No. 24 Arkansas Pine–Bluff; No. 25 Northern Iowa	

== Coaches Poll ==
	Week 4 March 16	Week 5 March 23	Week 6 March 30	Week 7 April 6	Week 8 April 13	Week 9 April 20	Final May 18	
1.	James Madison (3–0) (14)	James Madison (3–0) (18)	James Madison (4–0) (23)	James Madison (4–0) (21)	James Madison (4–0) (19)	James Madison (5–0) (18)	Sam Houston State (10–0) (23)	1.
2.	North Dakota (4–0) (5)	Weber State (2–0) (1)	Weber State (3–0)	Weber State (4–0) (1)	Weber State (5–0) (2)	South Dakota State (5–1) (3)	South Dakota State (8–2)	2.
3.	Weber State (2–0) (1)	North Dakota State (5–1) (1)	North Dakota State (5–1)	North Dakota State (5–1) (1)	North Dakota State (6–1) (2)	Weber State (5–0)	James Madison (7–1)	3.
4.	North Dakota State (4–1)	Sam Houston State (3–0)	South Dakota State (4–1)	South Dakota State (4–1)	South Dakota State (4–1)	Sam Houston State (6–0)	Delaware (7–1)	4.
5.	Southern Illinois (4–1)	North Dakota (4–1)т	Sam Houston State (3–0)	Sam Houston State (4–0)	Sam Houston State (5–0)	Delaware (5–0)	North Dakota State (7–3)	5.
6.	Sam Houston State (2–0)	South Dakota State (4–1)т	North Dakota (4–1)	North Dakota (4–1)	North Dakota (4–1)	North Dakota (4–1)	North Dakota (5–2)	6.
7.	South Dakota State (3–1)	Jacksonville State (7–1)	Kennesaw State (3–0)	Kennesaw State (4–0)	Delaware (4–0)	North Dakota State (6–2)	Jacksonville State (10–3)	7.
8.	Jacksonville State (6–1)	Kennesaw State (3–0)	Delaware (3–0)	Delaware (3–0)	Eastern Washington (5–1)	Eastern Washington (5–1)	Weber State (5–1)	8.
9.	Kennesaw State (2–0)	Delaware (2–0)	Eastern Washington (3–1)	Eastern Washington (4–1)	Jacksonville State (9–2)	Jacksonville State (9–2)	Southern Illinois (6–4)	9.
10.	Delaware (2–0)	Chattanooga (3–1)	VMI (5–0)	Jacksonville State (8–2)	Richmond (3–0)	Monmouth (3–0)	Monmouth (3–1)	10.
11.	Furman (3–1)	Eastern Washington (2–1)	Nicholls (4–1)	Villanova (2–1)	Villanova (2–1)	VMI (6–1)	Eastern Washington (5–2)	11.
12.	Chattanooga (2–1)т	Southern Illinois (4–2)	Jacksonville State (7–2)	Richmond (3–0)	VMI (5–1)	UC Davis (3–2)	VMI (6–2)	12.
13.	Eastern Washington (2–1)т	VMI (4–0)	Murray State (5–0)	VMI (5–1)	Monmouth (3–0)	Richmond (3–1)	Missouri State (5–5)	13.
14.	Northern Iowa (2–2)т	Nicholls (3–1)	UC Davis (3–1)	Incarnate Word (3–1)	UC Davis (3–2)	Southern Illinois (5–3)	Richmond (3–1)	14.
15.	Villanova (1–1)т	Incarnate Word (3–0)	Richmond (3–0)	UC Davis (3–2)	Southeastern Louisiana (4–2)	Kennesaw State (4–1)	Kennesaw State (4–1)	15.
16.	Nicholls (3–1)	Villanova (1–1)	Villanova (1–1)	Murray State (5–1)	Kennesaw State (4–1)	Villanova (2–2)	UC Davis (3–2)	16.
17.	Southeastern Louisiana (2–1)	Murray State (4–0)	Furman (3–2)	Nicholls (4–2)	Southern Illinois (4–3)	Missouri State (5–4)	Murray State (5–2)	17.
18.	VMI (3–0)	Furman (3–2)	Incarnate Word (3–1)	Southern Illinois (4–3)	Missouri State (5–4)	Murray State (5–2)	Villanova (2–2)	18.
19.	Albany (1–1)	UC Davis (2–1)	Southern Illinois (4–3)	Southeastern Louisiana (3–2)	Murray State (5–2)	Southern (5–1) (1)	Alabama A&M (5–0)	19.
20.	Incarnate Word (2–0)	Richmond (2–0)	Northern Iowa (3–3)	East Tennessee State (4–1)	Nicholls (4–3)	Nicholls (4–3)	Southern (5–1)	20.
21.	Jackson State (3–0)	Rhode Island (2–0)	Tarleton State (5–2)	Northern Iowa (3–3)	Southern (4–1)	Southeastern Louisiana (4–3)	Southeastern Louisiana (4–3)	21.
22.	Richmond (2–0)	Southeastern Louisiana (2–2)	Southeastern Louisiana (2–2)	Monmouth (2–0)	Incarnate Word (3–2)	Alabama A&M (4–0)	Sacred Heart (3–2)	22.
23.	New Hampshire (0–1)	Northern Iowa (2–2)	Missouri State (4–4)	Missouri State (4–4)	Northern Iowa (3–4)	East Tennessee State (4–2)	Nicholls State (4–3)	23.
24.	Murray State (3–0)	Tarleton State (4–2)	Rhode Island (2–1)	Rhode Island (2–1)	East Tennessee State (4–2)	Northern Iowa (3–4)	East Tennessee State (4–2)	24.
25.	UC Davis (1–1)	New Hampshire (0–1)	San Diego (3–0)	Southern (4–1)	Alabama A&M (3–0)т Mercer (5–5)т	Arkansas Pine–Bluff (4–0)	Holy Cross (3–1)	25.
	Week 4 March 16	Week 5 March 23	Week 6 March 30	Week 7 April 6	Week 8 April 13	Week 9 April 20	Final May 18	
		Dropped: No. 19 Albany; No. 21 Jackson State	Dropped: No. 10 Chattanooga; No. 25 New Hampshire	Dropped: No. 17 Furman; No. 21 Tarleton State; No. 25 San Diego	Dropped: No. 24 Rhode Island	Dropped: No. 22 Incarnate Word; No. 25 Mercer	Dropped: No. 22 Incarnate Word; No. 25 Mercer	
