= 2022 Colonial Athletic Association football season =

- League: NCAA Division I Football Championship Subdivision
- Sport: football
- Duration: September 1, 2022; December 9, 2023
- Teams: 13
- TV partner(s): FloSports, ESPN+

2023 NFL draft
- Finals champions: William & Mary, New Hampshire

Seasons
- 2021 2023

2022 Colonial Athletic Association football standings
	Conf.			Overall
Team	W		L	W		L
No. 8 William & Mary +^	7	–	1	11	–	2
No. 13 New Hampshire +^	7	–	1	9	–	4
No. 11 Richmond ^	6	–	2	9	–	4
No. 17 Elon ^	6	–	2	8	–	4
Rhode Island	5	–	3	7	–	4
No. 19 Delaware ^	4	–	4	8	–	5
Towson	4	–	4	6	–	5
Villanova	4	–	4	6	–	5
Monmouth	3	–	5	5	–	6
Albany	2	–	6	3	–	8
Maine	2	–	6	2	–	9
Hampton	1	–	7	4	–	7
Stony Brook	1	–	7	2	–	9
+ – Conference co-champions; ^ – FCS playoff participant; Rankings from STATS Poll

The 2022 Colonial Athletic Association football season was the 16th season of the Colonial Athletic Association football taking place during the 2022 NCAA Division I FCS football season. The season began on September 1, 2022, with non-conference play and with conference play beginning on September 24, 2022.

This was the final year that the conference was known as the Colonial Athletic Association. In July 2023, it rebranded to become the Coastal Athletic Association.

== Background ==
Monmouth and Hampton joined the CAA from the Big South Conference. James Madison left the CAA and transitioned to the FBS into the Sun Belt Conference.

== Preseason ==
=== Recruiting classes ===
National Rankings
Team	Total Signees
Albany	21
Delaware	20
Elon	24
Hampton	17
Maine	28
Monmouth	20
New Hampshire	24
Rhode Island	22
Richmond	15
Stony Brook	24
Towson	20
Villanova	25
William & Mary	27

=== CAA media day ===
The 2022 CAA media day was held on July 28, 2022. The teams and representatives in respective order were as follows:

- CAA Commissioner – Joe D'Antonio
- Albany – Greg Gattuso (HC) / Jackson Ambush (LB) / Thomas Greaney (TE)
- Delaware – Ryan Carty (HC) / Nolan Henderson (QB) / Kedrick Whitehead (S)
- Elon – Tony Trisciani (HC) / Cole Coleman (S) / Jackson Parham (WR)
- Hampton – Robert Prunty (HC) / Jadakis Bonds (WR) / Axel Perez (K/P)
- Maine – Jordan Stevens (HC) / Joe Fagnano (QB) / Adrian Otero (LB)
- Monmouth – Kevin Callahan (HC) / Eddie Morales III (DB/PR) / Tony Muskett (QB)
- New Hampshire – Rick Santos (HC) / Brian Espanet (WR) / Niko Kvietkus (DL)
- Rhode Island – Jim Fleming (HC) / Kasim Hill (QB) / Henry Yianakopolos (S)
- Richmond – Russ Huesman (HC) / Aaron Dykes (RB) / Tristan Wheeler (LB)
- Stony Brook – Chuck Priore (HC) / Reidgee Rimanche (LB) / Kyle Nunez (OL)
- Towson – Rob Ambrose (HC) / Cole Cheripko (OL) / Vinnie Shaffer (DL)
- Villanova – Mark Ferrante (HC) / Colin Gamroth (OL) / Jared Nelson (DL)
- William & Mary – Mike London (HC) / Carl Fowler (DL) / Colby Sorsdal (OL)

=== Preseason poll ===
The preseason poll was released on July 28, 2022.

CAA
Predicted finish	Team	Votes (1st place)
1	Villanova	270 (16)
2	Delaware	235 (7)
3	Rhode Island	224
4	Richmond	219
5	William & Mary	206 (2)
6	Elon	191 (1)
7	Stony Brook	151
8	Maine	134
9	New Hampshire	117
10	Monmouth	105
11	Towson	81
12	Albany	64
13	Hampton	31

- First place votes in ()

==== Preseason All-CAA teams ====
2022 Preseason All-CAA

- Offensive Player of the Year: Ty Son Lawton, RB, Stony Brook Sr.
- Defensive Player of the Year: Nate Lynn, DL, William & Mary, So.

All-CAA Offense
Position	Player	Class	Team
QB	Tony Muskett	Junior	Monmouth
RB	Ty Son Lawton	Senior	Stony Brook
RB	Bronson Yoder	Senior	William & Mary
FB	Luke Hamilton	Senior	Towson
WR	Jackson Parham	Senior	Elon
WR	Thyrick Pitts	GS	Delaware
WR	Rayjoun Pringle	Junior	Villanova
TE	Caleb Warren	Senior	Rhode Island
OL	Michael Corbi	GS	Villanova
OL	Nick Correia	Junior	Rhode Island
OL	Colin Gamroth	GS	Villanova
OL	Michael Gerace	GS	Maine
OL	Kyle Nunez	GS	Stony Brook
PK	Skyler Davis	Senior	Elon
KR	Aaron Dykes	Senior	Maine
PR	Eddie Morales III	GS	Monmouth

All-CAA Defense
Position	Player	Class	Team
DL	Artis Hemmingway	Senior	Delaware
DL	Nate Lynn	Senior	William & Mary
DL	Chase McGowan	Senior	Delaware
DL	Josiah Silver	Sophomore	New Hampshire
LB	Jackson Ambush	Sophomore	Albany
LB	Johnny Buchanan	Senior	Delaware
LB	Tyler King	Sophomore	Stony Brook
LB	KeShaun Moore	Senior	Hampton
LB	Tristan Wheeler	Junior	Richmond
CB	Jordan Jones	Senior	Rhode Island
CB	Ryan Poole	Senior	William & Mary
S	Cole Coleman	Senior	Elon
S	Kedrick Whitehead	Senior	Delaware
P	Tyler Pastula	Junior	Albany
SPEC	TD Ayo-Durojaiye	Senior	Villanova

All-CAA Honorable Mention
Position	Player	Team
QB	Nolan Henderson	Delaware
QB	Kasim Hill	Rhode Island
RB	Freddie Brock	Maine
RB	Juwon Farri	Monmouth
RB	Malachi Imoh	William & Mary
WR	Jadakis Bonds	Hampton
WR	Jaaron Hayek	Villanova
TE	Shawn Bowman	Maine
OL	Patrick Flynn	New Hampshire
OL	Colby Sorsdal	William & Mary
DL	Anthony Lang	Albany
DL	Torrence Williams	Elon
LB	Evan Stewart	Rhode Island
CB	Tre'Von Jones	Elon
S	Pop Bush	New Hampshire
S	Noah Plack	Delaware
KR	D'Ago Hunter	Towson
PR	Jourdan Townsend	Delaware
P	Ryan Kost	Monmouth
SPEC	Alex Washington	William & Mary

== Head coaches ==
Team	Head coach	Years at school	Overall record	Record at school	CAA record
Albany	Greg Gattuso	9	136–89	39–57	22–46
Delaware	Ryan Carty	1	8–5	8–5	4–4
Elon	Tony Trisciani	4	20–20	20–20	15–13
Hampton	Robert Prunty	5	21–23	21–23	1–7
Maine	Jordan Stevens	1	2–9	2–9	2–6
Monmouth	Kevin Callahan	30	178–135	178–135	3–5
New Hampshire	Rick Santos	2	15–9	15–9	12–4
Rhode Island	Jim Fleming	9	52–63	31–62	20–47
Richmond	Russ Huesman	6	92–66	33–29	23–21
Stony Brook	Chuck Priore	17	136–100	97–91	34–42
Towson	Rob Ambrose	13	79–83	76–76	49–55
Villanova	Mark Ferrante	6	37–26	37–26	23–21
William & Mary	Mike London	5	85–77	23–16	15–12

== Schedule ==
Index to colors and formatting
CAA member won
CAA member lost
CAA teams in **bold**

All times EST time.

=== Regular season schedule ===
==== Week One ====
Date	Time	Visiting team	Home team	Site	TV	Result	Attendance	Ref.
September 1	7:00 p.m.	**Monmouth**	**New Hampshire**	Wildcat Stadium • Durham, NH	FloSports	**UNH** 31–21	8,703	
September 1	7:00 p.m.	**Rhode Island**	No. 22 **Stony Brook**	Kenneth P. LaValle Stadium • Stony Brook, NY	Flosports	**URI** 35–14	7,101	
September 2	6:00 p.m.	Lehigh	**Villanova**	Villanova Stadium • Villanova, PA		**W** 45–17	6,101	
September 2	7:00 p.m.	**William & Mary**	Charlotte	Jerry Richardson Stadium • Charlotte, NC	ESPN3	**W** 41–24	13,940	
September 3	12:00 p.m.	No. 19 **Delaware**	Navy	Navy–Marine Corps Memorial Stadium • Annapolis, MD	CBSSN	**W** 14–7	30,542	
September 3	12:30 p.m.	No. 24 **Richmond**	Virginia	Scott Stadium • Charlottesville, VA	ACCRSN	**L** 17–34	41,122	
September 3	6:00 p.m.	**Towson**	Bucknell	Christy Mathewson–Memorial Stadium • Lewisburg, PA	ESPN+	**W** 14–13 ^{OT}	1,949	
September 3	6:00 p.m.	Howard	**Hampton**	Armstrong Stadium • Hampton, VA		**W** 31–28	2,588	
September 3	6:00 p.m.	**Albany**	Baylor	McLane Stadium • Waco, TX		**L** 10–69	41,242	
September 3	6:00 p.m.	**Maine**	New Mexico	University Stadium • Albuquerque, NM		**L** 0–41	15,166	
September 3	6:30 p.m.	**Elon**	Vanderbilt	FirstBank Stadium • Nashville, TN	SECN/ESPN+	**L** 31–42	20,120	
^{#}Rankings from AP Poll released prior to game. All times are in EST.

==== Week Two ====
Date	Time	Visiting team	Home team	Site	TV	Result	Attendance	Ref.
September 10	1:00 p.m.	**Villanova**	LIU	Bethpage Federal Credit Union Stadium • Brookville, NY		**W** 38–21	4,812	
September 10	1:00 p.m.	Colgate	**Maine**	Alfond Stadium • Orono, ME		**L** 18–21	5,295	
September 10	1:00 p.m.	Fordham	**Monmouth**	Kessler Stadium • West Long Branch, NJ		**L** 49–52	2,785	
September 10	5:00 p.m.	Saint Francis	**Richmond**	E. Claiborne Robins Stadium • Richmond, VA (FloSports/NBCS WA)		**W** 31–21	6,388	
September 10	6:00 p.m.	No. 22 **Rhode Island**	Bryant	Beirne Stadium • Smithfield, RI	ESPN+	**W** 35–21	4,893	
September 10	6:00 p.m.	Campbell	No. 20 **William & Mary**	Zable Stadium • Williamsburgm VA	Cox/FloSports	**W** 37–21	8,558	
September 10	6:00 p.m.	Delaware State	No. 10 **Delaware**	Delaware Stadium • Newark, DE (rivalry)	FloSports/NBCS Philadelphia	**W** 35–9	17,176	
September 10	6:00 p.m.	Tuskegee	**Hampton**	Armstrong Stadium • Hampton, VA		**W** 42–10	6,512	
September 10	6:00 p.m.	**Elon**	Wofford	Gibbs Stadium • Spartanburg, SC	ESPN+	**W** 26–0	2,569	
September 10	7:00 p.m.	**New Hampshire**	**Albany**	Tom & Mary Casey Stadium • Albany, NY	FloSports	**UNH** 28–23	7,174	
September 10	7:00 p.m.	Morgan State	**Towson**	Johnny Unitas Stadium • Towson, MD (The Battle for Greater Baltimore)	MPT	**W** 29–21	9,784	
^{#}Rankings from AP Poll released prior to game. All times are in EST.

==== Week Three ====
Date	Time	Visiting team	Home team	Site	TV	Result	Attendance	Ref.
September 17	12:00 p.m.	**Villanova**	Army	Michie Stadium • West Point, NY		**L** 10–49	32,320	
September 17	12:00 p.m.	**Richmond**	Lehigh	Goodman Stadium • Bethlehem, PA	ESPN+	**W** 30–6	6,178	
September 17	1:00 p.m.	No. 9 **Delaware**	No. 17 **Rhode Island**	Meade Stadium • Kingston, RI	FloSports	**DEL** 42–21	4,666	
September 17	1:00 p.m.	Fordham	**Albany**	Jack Coffey Field • Bronx, NY		**L** 45–48	5,000	
September 17	1:00 p.m.	Georgetown	**Monmouth**	Kessler Stadium • West Long Beach, NJ		**W** 45–6	2,589	
September 17	1:00 p.m.	**Towson**	West Virginia	Milan Puskar Stadium • Morgantown, WV	ESPN+	**L** 7–65	50,703	
September 17	2:00 p.m.	**Hampton**	Norfolk State	William "Dick" Price Stadium • Norfolk, VA		**W** 17–7	15,459	
September 17	3:30 p.m.	**Stony Brook**	UMass	Warren McGuirk Alumni Stadium • Amherst, MA		**L** 3–20	10,011	
September 17	3:30 p.m.	No. 15 **William & Mary**	Lafayette	Fisher Stadium • Easton, PA (ESPN+)		**W** 34–7	5,244	
September 17	6:00 p.m.	Gardner–Webb	**Elon**	Rhodes Stadium • Elon, NC	FloSports	**W** 30–24	8,126	
September 17	6:00 p.m.	North Carolina Central	No. 25 **New Hampshire**	Wildcat Stadium • Durham, NH	FloSports	**L** 27–45	9,630	
September 17	7:30 p.m.	**Maine**	Boston College	Alumni Stadium • Chestnut Hill, MA		**L** 17–38	34,325	
^{#}Rankings from AP Poll released prior to game. All times are in EST.

==== Week Four ====
Date	Time	Visiting team	Home team	Site	TV	Result	Attendance	Ref.
September 24	12:00 p.m.	No. 20 **Rhode Island**	No. 24 Pittsburgh	Acrisure Stadium • Pittsburgh, PA (ACCN)		**L** 24–45	54,667	
September 24	2:00 p.m.	**Stony Brook**	No. 22 **Richmond**	E. Claiborne Robins Stadium • Richmond, VA	FloSports/NBCS WA	**RIC** 51–7 ^{2OT}	7,618	
September 24	3:30 p.m.	Central Connecticut State	**Albany**	Tom & Mary Casey Stadium • Albany, NY		**W** 45–26	6,111	
September 24	3:30 p.m.	**Elon**	No. 14 **William & Mary**	Walter Zable Stadium • Williamsburg, VA	Cox/FloSports	**ELON** 35–31	10,803	
September 24	3:30 p.m.	**Monmouth**	**Villanova**	Villanova Stadium • Villanova, PA		**MON** 49–42	12,001	
September 24	4:00 p.m.	**New Hampshire**	**Towson**	Johnny Unitas Stadium • Towson, MD	FloSports	**UNH** 37–14	5,508	
September 24	6:00 p.m.	**Hampton**	No. 8 **Delaware**	Delaware Stadium • Newark, DE	FloSports	**DEL** 35–3	16,035	
^{#}Rankings from AP Poll released prior to game. All times are in EST.

==== Week Five ====
Date	Time	Visiting team	Home team	Site	TV	Result	Attendance	Ref.
October 1	12:00 p.m.	**Monmouth**	Lehigh	Goodman Stadium • Bethlehem, PA		**W** 35–7	2,923	
October 1	1:00 p.m.	No. 14 **Villanova**	**Maine**	Alfond Stadium • Orono, ME		**VIL** 45–20	7,168	
October 1	2:00 p.m.	No. 17 **Richmond**	No. 23 **Elon**	Rhodes Stadium • Elon, NC	FloSports	**ELON** 30–27	9,243	
October 1	3:30 p.m.	No. 18 **William & Mary**	**Stony Brook**	Kenneth P. LaValle Stadium • Stony Brook, NY	FloSports	**W&M** 27–10	3,581	
October 1	3:30 p.m.	**Towson**	No. 6 **Delaware**	Delaware Stadium • Newark, DE	FloSports/NBCS Philadelphia	**DEL** 24–10	18,905	
October 1	6:00 p.m.	Brown	**Rhode Island**	Meade Stadium • Kingston, RI (rivalry)	FloSports	**W** 38–10	5,028	
October 1	6:00 p.m.	**New Hampshire**	Western Michigan	Waldo Stadium • Kalamazoo, MI	ESPN3	**L** 7–44	20,119	
^{#}Rankings from AP Poll released prior to game. All times are in EST.

==== Week Six ====
Date	Time	Visiting team	Home team	Site	TV	Result	Attendance	Ref.
October 8	1:00 p.m.	**Albany**	**Monmouth**	Kessler Stadium • West Long Branch, NJ		**MON** 38–31	2,532	
October 8	2:00 p.m.	**Maine**	**Hampton**	Armstrong Stadium • Hampton, VA		**ME** 31–24	4,512	
October 8	2:00 p.m.	**Towson**	No. 14 **Elon**	Rhodes Stadium • Elon, NC	FloSports	**ELON** 27–10	5,578	
October 8	3:30 p.m.	**Stony Brook**	**New Hampshire**	Wildcat Stadium • Durham, NH	FloSports	**UNH** 24–14	13,273	
October 8	3:30 p.m.	No. 6 **Delaware**	No. 16 **William & Mary**	Walter Zable Stadium • Williamsburg, VA (rivalry)	Cox/FloSports	**W&M** 27–21	12,506	
^{#}Rankings from AP Poll released prior to game. All times are in EST.

==== Week Seven ====
Date	Time	Visiting team	Home team	Site	TV	Result	Attendance	Ref.
October 15	1:00 p.m.	**Monmouth**	**Maine**	Alfond Stadium • Orono, ME		**ME** 38–28	6,241	
October 15	1:00 p.m.	No. 14 **Elon**	No. 25 **Rhode Island**	Meade Stadium • Kingston, RI	FloSports	**URI** 17–10	5,415	
October 15	1:30 p.m.	**New Hampshire**	Dartmouth	Memorial Field • Hanover, NH (rivalry)	ESPN+	**W** 14–0	3,580	
October 15	3:30 p.m.	**Hampton**	**Albany**	Tom & Mary Casey Stadium • Albany, NY		**HAM** 38–37	8,212	
October 15	3:30 p.m.	No. 17 **Villanova**	No. 21 **Richmond**	E. Claiborn Robins Stadium • Richmond, VA	FloSports/MASN	**RIC** 20–10	7,830	
October 15	6:00 p.m.	**Stony Brook**	Fordham	Jack Coffey Field • Bronx, NY		**L** 14–45	1,914	
^{#}Rankings from AP Poll released prior to game. All times are in EST.

==== Week Eight ====
Date	Time	Visiting team	Home team	Site	TV	Result	Attendance	Ref.
October 22	1:00 p.m.	No. 22 **Rhode Island**	**Monmouth**	Kessler Stadium • West Long Branch, NJ	FloSports	**URI** 48–46 ^{7OT}	3,478	
October 22	1:00 p.m.	No. 21 **Elon**	No. 25 **New Hampshire**	Wildcat Stadium • Durham, NH	FloSports	**UNH** 40–22	14,137	
October 22	2:00 p.m.	No. 19 **Richmond**	**Hampton**	Armstrong Stadium • Hampton, VA	FloSports	**RIC** 41–10	0	
October 22	3:00 p.m.	Morgan State	No. 13 **Delaware**	Delaware Stadium • Newark, DE	FloSports	**W** 38–7	16,375	
October 22	3:30 p.m.	**Albany**	**Villanova**	Villanova Stadium • Villanova, PA		**VIL** 31–29	6,741	
October 22	3:30 p.m.	**Maine**	**Stony Brook**	Kenneth P. LaValle Stadium • Stony Brook, NY		**STBK** 28–27	7,174	
October 22	4:00 p.m.	**William & Mary**	**Towson**	Johnny Unitas Stadium • Towson, MD	FloSports	**W&M** 44–24	4,445	
^{#}Rankings from AP Poll released prior to game. All times are in EST.

==== Week Nine ====
Date	Time	Visiting team	Home team	Site	TV	Result	Attendance	Ref.
October 29	1:00 p.m.	**Stony Brook**	**Albany**	Tom & Mary Casey Stadium • Albany, NY		**ALB** 59–14	2,403	
October 29	1:00 p.m.	**Hampton**	**Villanova**	Villanova Stadium • Villanova, PA		**VIL** 24–10	4,097	
October 29	1:00 p.m.	**Towson**	**Monmouth**	Kessler Stadium • West Long Branch, NJ		**TOW** 52–48	3,729	
October 29	1:00 p.m.	No. 18 **Rhode Island**	No. 10 **William & Mary**	Walter Zable Stadium • Williamsburg, VA	FloSports	**W&M** 31–30	7,981	
October 29	1:00 p.m.	No. 17 **Richmond**	**Maine**	Alfond Stadium • Orono, ME	FloSports	**RIC** 31–21	4,278	
October 29	3:30 p.m.	No. 12 **Delaware**	**Elon**	Rhodes Stadium • Elon, NC	FloSports	**ELON** 27–7	5,541	
^{#}Rankings from AP Poll released prior to game. All times are in EST.

==== Week Ten ====
Date	Time	Visiting team	Home team	Site	TV	Result	Attendance	Ref.
November 5	1:00 p.m.	**Monmouth**	No. 18 **Delaware**	Delaware Stadium • Newark, DE	FloSports/NBCS Philadelphia	**DEL** 49–17	16,385	
November 5	1:00 p.m.	No. 8 **William & Mary**	**Hampton**	Armstrong Stadium • Hampton, VA	FloSports	**W&M** 20–14	4,126	
November 5	1:00 p.m.	Morgan State	**Stony Brook**	Kenneth P. LaValle Stadium • Stony Brook, NY		**W** 24–22	4,502	
November 5	1:00 p.m.	**Maine**	No. 23 **Rhode Island**	Meade Stadium • Kingston, RI	FloSports	**URI** 26–22	4,377	
November 5	2:00 p.m.	**Villanova**	**Towson**	Johnny Unitas Stadium • Towson, MD		**TOW** 27–3	4,057	
November 5	2:00 p.m.	**Albany**	No. 19 **Elon**	Rhodes Stadium • Elon, NC	FloSports	**ELON** 27–3	8,368	
November 5	3:30 p.m.	No. 17 **New Hampshire**	No. 14 **Richmond**	E. Claiborn Robins Stadium • Richmond, VA	FloSports	**RIC** 40–34	6,329	
^{#}Rankings from College Football Playoff. All times are in EST.

==== Week Eleven ====
Date	Time	Visiting team	Home team	Site	TV	Result	Attendance	Ref.
November 12	12:00 p.m.	**Maine**	**Albany**	Tom & Mary Casey Stadium • Albany, NY		**ALB** 23–21	2,301	
November 12	1:00 p.m.	**Towson**	**Stony Brook**	Kenneth P. LaValle Stadium • Stony Brook, NY		**TOW** 21–17	3,513	
November 12	10:30 p.m.	No. 18 **Elon**	**Hampton**	Armstrong Stadium • Hampton, VA	FloSports	**ELON** 38–24	0	
November 12	1:00 p.m.	No. 22 **Rhode Island**	No. 21 **New Hampshire**	Wildcat Stadium • Durham, NH	FloSports	**UNH** 31–28	8,045	
November 12	1:00 p.m.	**Villanova**	No. 8 **William & Mary**	Walter Zable Stadium • Williamsburg, VA	Cox/FloSports	**W&M** 45–12	10,280	
November 12	1:00 p.m.	No. 12 **Richmond**	No. 17 **Delaware**	Delaware Stadium • Newark, DE	FloSports	**RIC** 21–13	16,534	
^{#}Rankings from College Football Playoff. All times are in EST.

==== Week Twelve ====
Date	Time	Visiting team	Home team	Site	TV	Result	Attendance	Ref.
November 19	1:00 p.m.	No. 18 **New Hampshire**	**Maine**	Alfond Stadium • Orono, ME	FloSports	**UNH** 42–41	4,638	
November 19	12:00 p.m.	**Stony Brook**	**Monmouth**	Kessler Stadium • West Long Branch, NJ		**MON** 24–21	2,204	
November 19	12:00 p.m.	No. 8 **William & Mary**	No. 11 **Richmond**	E. Claiborn Robins Stadium • Richmond, VA	Capital Cup	**W&M** 37–26	8,200	
November 19	1:00 p.m.	**Albany**	**Rhode Island**	Meade Stadium • Kingston, RI	FloSports	**URI** 35–21	3,603	
November 19	1:00 p.m.	**Hampton**	**Towson**	Johnny Unitas Stadium • Towson, MD		**TOW** 27–7	4,045	
November 19	1:00 p.m.	No. 20 **Delaware**	**Villanova**	Villanova Stadium • Villanova, PA (Battle of the Blue)	FloSports	**VIL** 29–26	6,451	
^{#}Rankings from College Football Playoff. All times are in EST.

==== Playoffs ====
First round

Date	Time	Visiting team	Home team	Site	TV	Result	Attendance	Ref.
November 26	12:00 p.m.	No. 12 **Elon**	No. 11 Furman	Paladin Stadium • Greenville, South Carolina	ESPN+	**L** 6–31	2,717	
November 26	2:00 p.m.	No. 16 Fordham	No. 15 **New Hampshire**	Wildcat Stadium • Durham, NH	FloSports	**W** 52–42	2,989	
November 26	2:00 p.m.	Davidson	No. 13 **Richmond**	E. Claiborn Robins Stadium • Richmond, VA	ESPN+	**W** 41–0	3,000	
November 26	2:00 p.m.	Saint Francis	No. 23 **Delaware**	Delaware Stadium • Newark, DE	ESPN+	**W** 56–17	4,629	
^{#}Rankings from College Football Playoff. All times are in EST.

Second round

Date	Time	Visiting team	Home team	Site	TV	Result	Attendance	Ref.
December 3	12:00 p.m.	No. 15 **New Hampshire**	No. 7 Holy Cross	Fitton Field • Worcester, MA		**L** 19–35	6,265	
December 3	2:00 p.m.	Gardner–Webb	No. 6 **William & Mary**	Walter Zable Stadium • Williamsburg, VA	ESPN+	**W** 54–14	7,110	
December 3	2:00 p.m.	No. 23 **Delaware**	No. 1 South Dakota State	Dana J. Dykhouse Stadium • Brookings, SD	ESPN+	**L** 6–42	6,117	
December 3	2:00 p.m.	No. 13 **Richmond**	No. 2 Sacramento State	Hornet Stadium • Sacramento, CA	ESPN+	**L** 31–38	9,136	
^{#}Rankings from College Football Playoff. All times are in EST.

Quarterfinals

Date	Time	Visiting team	Home team	Site	TV	Result	Attendance	Ref.
December 9	8:00 p.m.	No. 6 **William & Mary**	No. 3 Montana State	Bobcat Stadium • Bozeman, MT	ESPN2/ESPN+	**L** 7–55	14,367	
^{#}Rankings from College Football Playoff. All times are in EST.

== Head to head matchups ==
Head to head
Team	Albany	Delaware	Elon	Hampton	Maine	Monmouth	New Hampshire	Rhode Island	Richmond	Stony Brook	Towson	Villanova	William & Mary
Albany	–	–	L 3–27	L 37–38	W 23–21	L 31–38	L 23–28	L 21–35	–	W 59–14	–	L 29–31	–
Delaware	–	–	L 7–27	W 35–3	–	W 49–17	–	W 42–21	L 13–21	–	W 24–10	L 26–29	L 21–27
Elon	W 27–3	W 27–7	–	W 38–24	–	–	L 22–40	L 10–17	W 30–27 OT	–	W 27–10	–	W 35–31
Hampton	W 38–37 OT	L 3–35	L 24–38	–	L 24–31	–	–	–	L 10–41	–	L 7–27	L 10–24	L 14–20
Maine	L 21–23	–	–	W 31–24	–	W 38–28	L 41–42 OT	L 22–26	L 21–31	L 27–28	–	L 20–45	–
Monmouth	W 38–31	L 17–49	–	–	L 28–38	–	L 21–31	L 46–48 7OT	–	W 24–21	L 48–52	W 49–42	–
New Hampshire	W 28–23	–	W 40–22	–	W 42–41 OT	W 31–21	–	W 31–28	L 34–40	W 24–14	W 37–14	–	–
Rhode Island	W 35–21	L 21–42	W 17–10	–	W 26–22	W 48–46 7OT	L 28–31	–	–	W 35–14	–	–	L 30–31
Richmond	–	W 21–13	L 27–30 2OT	–	W 31–21	–	W 40–34	–	–	W 51–7	–	W 20–10	L 26–37
Stony Brook	L 14–59	–	–	–	W 28–27	L 21–24	L 14–24	L 14–35	L 7–51	–	L 17–21	–	L 10–27
Towson	–	L 10–24	L 10–27	W 27–7	–	W 52–48	L 14–37	–	–	W 21–17	–	W 27–3	L 24–44
Villanova	W 31–29	W 29–26	–	W 24–10	W 45–20	L 42–49	–	–	L 10–20	–	L 3–27	–	L 12–45
William & Mary	–	W 27–21	L 31–35	W 20–14	–	–	–	W 31–30	W 45–17	W 37–26	W 44–24	W 45–12	–

Updated with the results of all regular season conference games.

=== CAA vs FBS matchups ===
The Football Bowl Subdivision comprises 11 conferences and four independent programs.

Date	Visitor	Home	Site	Score
September 2	William & Mary	Charlotte	Jerry Richardson Stadium • Charlotte, NC	W 41–24
September 3	Delaware	Navy	Navy-Marine Corps Memorial Stadium • Annapolis, MD	W 14–7
September 3	Richmond	Virginia	Scott Stadium • Charlottesville, VA	L 17–34
September 3	Albany	Baylor	McLane Stadium • Waco, TX	L 10–69
September 3	Elon	Vanderbilt	FirstBank Stadium • Nashville, TN	L 31–42
September 3	Maine	New Mexico	University Stadium • Albuquerque, NM	L 0–41
September 17	Villanova	Army	Michie Stadium • West Point, NY	L 10–49
September 17	Towson	West Virginia	Milan Puskar Stadium • Morgantown, WV	L 7–65
September 17	Stony Brook	UMass	McGuirk Alumni Stadium • Amherst, MA	L 3–20
September 17	Maine	Boston College	Alumni Stadium • Chestnut Hill, MA	L 17–38
September 24	Rhode Island	Pittsburgh	Acrisure Stadium • Pittsburgh, PA	L 24–45
October 1	New Hampshire	Western Michigan	Waldo Stadium • Kalamazoo, MI	L 7–44

== Rankings ==
Legend
	Improvement in ranking
	Drop in ranking
	Not ranked previous week
	No change in ranking from previous week
RV	Received votes but were not ranked in Top 25 of poll
т	Tied with team above or below also with this symbol

		Pre	Wk 1	Wk 2	Wk 3	Wk 4	Wk 5	Wk 6	Wk 7	Wk 8	Wk 9	Wk 10	Wk 11	Wk 12	Final
Albany	STATS														
Albany	C														
Delaware	STATS	19	10	9	8	6	6	13	13	12	18	17	20	23	19
Delaware	C	19	13	10	8	6	6	12	12	11	16	15	19	RV	24т
Elon	STATS		RV	RV	RV	23	14	14	21	RV	19	18	14	12	17
Elon	C	RV				23	17	17	25	RV	23	21	18	15	18
Hampton	STATS														
Hampton	C				RV				RV						
Maine	STATS														
Maine	C														
Monmouth	STATS	RV				RV	RV	RV							
Monmouth	C					RV	RV	RV							
New Hampshire	STATS		RV	25	RV	RV	RV	RV	25	19	17	21	18	15	13
New Hampshire	C			RV	RV	RV		RV		25	21	25	20	16	15
Rhode Island	STATS	22	22	17	20	RV	RV	25т	22	18	23	22	RV	RV	RV
Rhode Island	C	24т	20т	14	21	25	23	22	19	17	22	22	RV	RV	RV
Richmond	STATS	24	RV	RV	22	17	23	21	19	17	14	12	11	13	11
Richmond	C	24т	RV	RV	24т	22	RV	25	21	20	14	13	11	14	12
Stony Brook	STATS														
Stony Brook	C														
Towson	STATS														
Towson	C			RV											
Villanova	STATS	6	6	7	9	14	15	17	RV	RV	RV				
Villanova	C	5	5	5	10	15	13	16	RV	RV					
William & Mary	STATS	RV	20	15	14	18	16	11	12	10	8	8	8	6	8
William & Mary	C	RV	22	17	14	21	17	13	13	12	9	8	8	8	8

== Awards and honors ==
=== Player of the week honors ===
Week	Offensive			Defensive			Special Teams			Rookie		
Week	Player	Team	Position	Player	Team	Position	Player	Team	Position	Player	Team	Position
Week 1	Darius Wilson	William & Mary	QB	Johnny Buchanan	Delaware	LB	Josiah Silver	New Hampshire	DL	Isaiah Perkins	Towson	WR
Week 2	Dylan Laube	New Hampshire	RB	Jalen Jones	William & Mary	CB	Jeff Yurk	Elon	P	A.J. Pena	Rhode Island	LB
Week 2	Jaden Shirden	Monmouth	RB	Jalen Jones	William & Mary	CB	Jeff Yurk	Elon	P	A.J. Pena	Rhode Island	LB
Week 3	Nolan Henderson	Delaware	QB	John Pius	William & Mary	LB	D'Ago Hunter	Towson	KR	Reese Poffenbarger	Albany	QB
Week 4	Jaden Shirden	Monmouth	RB	Marcus Hillman	Elon	LB	Dylan Laube	New Hampshire	RB	Reese Poffenbarger	Albany	QB
Week 4	Reece Udinski	Richmond	QB	Marcus Hillman	Elon	LB	Dylan Laube	New Hampshire	RB	Reese Poffenbarger	Albany	QB
Week 5	Jaaron Hayek	Villanova	WR	Johnny Buchanan	Delaware	LB	Ethan Chang	William & mary	K	Johncarlos Miller II	Elon	TE
Week 6	Bronson Yoder	William & Mary	RB	Mike Reid	Monmouth	DB	Skyler Davis	Elon	K	Reese Poffenbarger	Albany	QB
Week 7	Malcolm Mays	Hampton	QB	Khairi Manns	Maine	DL	Andrew Lopez	Richmond	K	Reese Poffenbarger	Albany	QB
Week 7	Malcolm Mays	Hampton	QB	Jarrett Martin	Rhode Island	LB	Andrew Lopez	Richmond	K	Reese Poffenbarger	Albany	QB
Week 8	Marques DeShields	Rhode Island	RB	Tye Freeland	William & Mary	S	Sean Lehane	New Hampshire	P	Charlie McKee	Stony Brook	QB
Week 8	Marques DeShields	Rhode Island	RB	Jeremiah Grant	Richmond	DE	Sean Lehane	New Hampshire	P	Charlie McKee	Stony Brook	QB
Week 9	Reece Udinski	Richmond	QB	Omar Rogers	Elon	DB	D'Ago Hunter	Towson	KR/PR	Reese Poffenbarger	Albany	QB
Week 10	Nolan Henderson	Delaware	QB	Marcus Hillman	Elon	DB	D'Ago Hunter	Towson	KR/PR	Isaiah Perkins	Towson	WR
Week 11	Max Brosmer	New Hampshire	QB	Marlem Louis	Richmond	DE	Jake Larson	Richmond	K	Reese Poffenbarger	Albany	QB
Week 11	Darius Wilson	William & Mary	QB	Marlem Louis	Richmond	DE	Jake Larson	Richmond	K	Reese Poffenbarger	Albany	QB
Week 12	Dylan Laube	New Hampshire	RB	John Pius	William & Mary	LB	Oneil Robinson	Rhode Island	S	Shane Hartzell	Villanova	LB

=== CAA Individual Awards ===
The following individuals received postseason honors as voted by the Colonial Athletic Association football coaches at the end of the season.

Award	Player	School
Offensive Player of the Year	Jaden Shirden, RB	Monmouth
Defensive Player of the Year	John Pius, LB	William & Mary
Coach of the Year	Rick Santos	New Hampshire
Special Teams Player of the Year	D'Ago Hunter, KR	Towson
Offensive Rookie of the Year	Reese Poffenbarger, QB	Albany
Defensive Rookie of the Year	Jalen Jones, CB	William & Mary
Chuck Boone Leadership and Excellence Award	Tristan Wheeler, LB	Richmond

=== All-conference teams ===
The following players earned CAA honors.

First Team

Position	Player	Class	Team
First Team Offense
QB	Reece Udinski	Gr.	RIC
RB	Jaden Shirden	So.	MON
RB	Bronson Yoder	Sr.	W&M
FB	Owen Wright	Gr.	MON
WR	Jadakis Bonds	Sr.	HAM
WR	Jaaron Hayek	Sr.	VIL
WR	Jakob Herres	Gr.	RIC
TE	Thomas Greaney	Sr.	ALB
OL	Ryan Coll	Jr.	RIC
OL	Ajani Cornelius	So.	URI
OL	Nick Correia	Jr.	URI
OL	Charles Grant	So.	W&M
OL	Colby Sorsdal	Sr.	W&M
First Team Defense
DL	Marlem Louis	Jr.	RIC
DL	Nate Lynn	Jr.	W&M
DL	Dylan Ruiz	So.	UNH
DL	Josiah Silver	So.	UNH
LB	Johnny Buchanan	Gr.	DEL
LB	Marcus Hillman	Sr.	ELON
LB	John Pius	So.	W&M
LB	Tristan Wheeler	Jr.	RIC
DB	Jordan Jones	Sr.	URI
DB	Ryan Poole	Sr.	W&M
DB	Noah Plack	Sr.	DEL
DB	Kedrick Whitehead	Sr.	DEL
First Team Special Teams
PK	Skyler Davis	Sr.	ELON
P	Ryan Kost	Gr.	MON
KR	D'Ago Hunter	Sr.	TOW
PR	Dyaln Laube	Jr.	UNH
SPEC	Caylin Newton	Sr.	W&M

Second Team

Position	Player	Class	Team
Second Team Offense
QB	Nolan Henderson	Gr.	DEL
RB	Marques DeShields	Sr.	URI
RB	Dylan Laube	Jr.	UNH
FB	Donavyn Lester	Sr.	W&M
WR	Ed Lee	Sr.	URI
WR	Dymere Miller	Jr.	MON
WR	Jackson Parham	Sr.	ELON
TE	Lachlan Pitts	Sr.	W&M
OL	Michael Corbi	Gr.	VIL
OL	Patrick Flynn	Sr.	UNH
OL	Michael Gerace	Gr.	ME
OL	Joe More	Sr.	RIC
OL	Mike Purcell	Sr.	ELON
Second Team Defense
DL	Carl Foler	Sr.	W&M
DL	Jesus Gibbs	Sr.	TOW
DL	Artis Hemmingway	Sr.	DEL
DL	KeShaun Moore	Sr.	HAM
LB	Jake Fire	Sr.	URI
LB	Isaiah Jones	Sr.	W&M
LB	Adrian Otero	Sr.	ME
LB	Qwahsin Townsel	Gr.	HAM
DB	Justis Henley	Sr.	DEL
DB	Jalen Jones	Fr.	W&M
DB	Aaron Banks	Sr.	RIC
DB	Omar Rogers	So.	ELON
Second Team Special Teams
PK	Ethan Chang	So.	W&M
P	Riley Williams	So.	TOW
KR	Dez Boykin	Gr.	VIL
PR	D'Ago Hunter	Sr.	TOW
SPEC	AJ Mistler	Gr.	ALB

Third Team

Position	Player	Class	Team
Third Team Offense
QB	Reese Poffenbarger	Fr.	ALB
RB	Jalen Hampton	Fr.	ELON
RB	Todd Sibley	Gr.	ALB
FB	Zavier Scott	Gr.	ME
WR	Leroy Henley	Gr.	RIC
WR	Thyrick Pitts	Gr.	DEL
WR	Jourdan Townsend	Sr.	DEL
TE	Shawn Bowman	Sr.	ME
OL	Greg Anderson	Sr.	MON
OL	Finton Brose	Jr.	DEL
OL	Justin Szuba	Gr.	MON
OL	Lorenzo Thompson	Jr.	URI
OL	Jabril Williams	Jr.	ELON
Third Team Defense
DL	Ray Eldridge	Sr.	RIC
DL	Jeremiah Grant	So.	RIC
DL	Anton Juncaj	Jr.	ALB
DL	Chase McGowan	Sr.	DEL
LB	Carthell Flowers-Lloyd	Gr.	STBK
LB	Dylan Kelly	So.	ALB
LB	Phil O'Connor	St.	RIC
LB	Evan Stewart	So.	URI
DB	Tre'Von Jones	Jr.	ELON
DB	Mike Reid	Jr.	MON
DB	Pop Bush	Gr.	UNH
DB	Ali Shockley	Sr.	HAM
Third Team Special Teams
PK	Matthew Mercurio	Gr.	VIL
P	Jeff Yurk	SO.	ELON
KR	Dylan Laube	Jr.	TOW
PR	Ed Lee	Sr.	URI
SPEC	Chandler Brayboy	So.	ELON

== Home game announced attendance ==
Team	Stadium	Capacity	Game 1	Game 2	Game 3	Game 4	Game 5	Game 6	Game 7	Total	Average	% of capacity
Albany	Tom & Mary Casey Stadium	8,500	7,175	6,111	8,212†	2,403	2,301	---	---	26,202	5,240	61.6%
Delaware	Delaware Stadium	18,800	17,176	16,035	**18,905†**	16,375	16,385	16,534	4,629	106,039	15,148	80.6%
Elon	Rhodes Stadium	11,250	8,126	9,243†	5,578	5,541	8,368	---	---	36,856	7,371	65.5%
Hampton	Armstrong Stadium	12,000	2,587	6,512†	4,512	---	4,126	---	---	17,737	4,434	37.0%
Maine	Alfond Stadium	10,000	5,295	7,168†	6,241	4,278	4,638	---	---	27,620	5,524	55.2%
Monmouth	Kessler Stadium	4,200	2,785	2,589	2,532	3,478	3,729†	---	---	15,113	3,023	72.0%
New Hampshire	Wildcat Stadium	11,015	8,703	9,630	**13,273**	**14,137†**	8,045	2,989	---	56,777	9,463	85.9%
Rhode Island	Meade Stadium	6,555	4,666	5,028	5,415†	4,377	3,603	---	---	23,089	4,718	72.0%
Richmond	E. Claiborne Robins Stadium	8,217	6,388	7,618	7,830	6,329	8,200†	3,000	---	39,365	6,561	79.8%
Stony Brook	Kenneth P. LaValle Stadium	12,300	7,101	3,581	7,714†	4,502	3,513	---	---	26,411	5,282	42.9%
Towson	Johnny Unitas Stadium	11,198	9,784†	5,508	4,445	4,057	4,045	---	---	27,839	5,568	49.7%
Villanova	Villanova Stadium	12,500	6,101	12,001†	6,741	4,097	6,451	---	---	35,391	7,078	56.6%
William & Mary	Zable Stadium	12,672	8,558	10,803†	12,506	7,981	10,280	7,110	---	57,238	9,540	75.3%

Bold – exceeded capacity
† Season high
‡ Record stadium Attendance

== NFL draft ==
The following list includes all CAA Players who were drafted in the 2023 NFL draft.

Player	Position	School	Draft Round	Round Pick	Overall Pick	Team	Ref
Colby Sorsdal	OT	William & Mary	5	17	152	Detroit Lions	

=== Undrafted free agents ===
The following list includes all CAA Players who went undrafted in the 2023 NFL draft but signed following the draft.

Player	Position	School	Team	Ref
Thomas Greaney	TE	Albany	Cleveland Browns	
Nolan Henderson	QB	Delaware	Baltimore Ravens	
Thyrick Pitts	WR	Delaware	Chicago Bears	
Cole Coleman	S	Elon	Indianapolis Colts	
Zavier Scott	RB	Maine	Indianapolis Colts	
Owen Wright	RB	Monmouth	Baltimore Ravens	
Jordan Jones	CB	Rhode Island	Los Angeles Rams	
Damien Caffrey	TE	Stony Brook	Chicago Bears	
Jadakis Bonds	WR	Hampton	Green Bay Packers	
Ed Lee	WR	Rhode Island	New England Patriots	

=== Minicamp ===
The following list includes all CAA Players who went undrafted in the 2023 NFL draft but were offered minicamp invites.

Player	Position	School	Team	Ref
KeShaun Moore	EDGE	Hampton	Indianapolis Colts	
Ali Shockley	S	Hampton	Washington Commanders	
Michael Greene	C	Maine	Indianapolis Colts	
Sean Coyne	WR	New Hampshire	Kansas City Chiefs	
Caleb Warren	TE	Rhode Island	Seattle Seahawks	
Reece Udinski	QB	Richmond	Seattle Seahawks	
Lachlan Pitts	TE	William & Mary	Chicago Bears / Minnesota Vikings	
