= 2023 Rhode Island Rams football team =

American college football season

2023 Rhode Island Rams football
- Conference: CAA Football Conference
- Record: 6–5 (4–4 CAA)
- Head coach: Jim Fleming (10th season)
- Offensive coordinator: Patrick Murphy (4th season)
- Defensive coordinator: Chris Lorenti (1st season)
- Home stadium: Meade Stadium

2023 Coastal Athletic Association Football Conference standings
	Conf.			Overall
Team	W		L	W		L
No. 5 Albany +^	7	–	1	11	–	4
No. 6 Villanova +^	7	–	1	10	–	3
No. 15 Richmond +^	7	–	1	9	–	4
No. 10 Delaware ^	6	–	2	9	–	4
Elon	6	–	2	6	–	5
New Hampshire	4	–	4	6	–	5
Rhode Island	4	–	4	6	–	5
William & Mary	4	–	4	6	–	5
Campbell	4	–	4	5	–	6
Towson	4	–	4	5	–	6
Hampton	3	–	5	5	–	6
Monmouth	3	–	5	4	–	7
Maine	1	–	7	2	–	9
North Carolina A&T	0	–	8	1	–	10
Stony Brook	0	–	8	0	–	10
+ – Conference co-champions; ^ – FCS playoff participant; Rankings from STATS Poll

The 2023 Rhode Island Rams football team represented the University of Rhode Island as a member of the Coastal Athletic Association Football Conference (CAA) during the 2023 NCAA Division I FCS football season. The Rams were led by tenth-year head coach Jim Fleming and played their home games at Meade Stadium.

The CAA, formerly known as the Colonial Athletic Association from 2007 through 2022, changed its name in July 2023 to accommodate future membership expansion outside of the Thirteen Colonies.

== Offseason ==
=== Team departures ===
2023 Rhode Island offseason departures
Name	Number	Pos.	Height, Weight	Year	Hometown
Paul Woods	#2	WR	6'1, 180	(redshirt) Senior	Buffalo, NY
Kennique Bonner-Steward	#7	QB	6'4, 230	(redshirt) Sophomore	Fayetteville, NC
Oneil Robinson	#9	DB	6'2, 203	Senior	Hartford, CT
Marques DeShields	#10	RB	5'9, 200	(redshirt) Senior	Clementon, NJ
Ed Lee	#13	WR	5'10, 185	(redshirt) Senior	Washington, D.C.
Jordan Colbert	#16	DB	6'3, 215	(redshirt) Graduate	Clinton, MD
Jordan Jones	#23	DB	6'0, 180	(redshirt) Senior	Brooklyn, NY
Henry Yianakopolos	#29	DB/LB	6'1, 225	(redshirt) Senior	Hopkinton, NH
Davey Schaum-Bartocci	#37	P	6'1, 187	(redshirt) Senior	Penfield, NY
Malik Gavek	#40	DB	5'10, 195	(redshirt) Senior	Cranston, RI
Matt Thomas	#55	DL	6'3, 271	Junior	Brooklyn, NY
Danilson DaVeiga	#56	LB	6'2, 230	Senior	Central Falls, RI
Jake Fire	#58	LB	5'11, 230	(redshirt) Senior	Stow, MA
Daniel Ayriyan	#61	OL	6'2, 290	Senior	Smithfield, RI
Ajani Cornelius	#65	OL	6'5, 310	Sophomore	Harlem, NY
DeJuan Ellis	#80	WR	6'0, 177	(redshirt) senior	Accokeek, Maryland
Caleb Warren	#82	TE	6'3, 245	Senior	Brandon, FL
J. T. Gibbons	#83	WR	6'0, 225	Senior	Wakefield, RI
Pedro Schmidt	#86	WR	6'0, 195	(redshirt) Graduate	North Huntingdon, PA
Jalen Brown	#97	DL	6'0, 266	(redshirt) Graduate	Clinton, MD
Jasyn Andrews	#98	DL	6'3, 298	Senior	Stamford, CT

=== Transfer portal ===
==== Outgoing transfers ====
Seven Rhode Island Rams players via NCAA Transfer Portal during or after the 2022 season.

Rhode Island outgoing transfers
Name	No.	Pos.	Height/Weight	Year	Hometown	College transferred to	Sources
Matt Thomas	#55	LB	6'3, 271	Junior	Brooklyn, NY	Colorado State	
Ajani Cornelius	#65	OL	6'5, 310	Sophomore	Harlem, NY	Oregon	
James Makszin	#17	DL	6'4, 285	(redshirt) Senior	Norwalk, CT	Ball State	
Sean Stackpole	#86	TE	6'4, 255	Sophomore	Chelmsford, MA	Stonehill	
Dylan Brown	#97	DL	6'2, 335	(redshirt) Senior	Tampa, FL	Florida State	
Michael Strachan	#57	LB	6'2, 230	(redshirt) Sophomore	Attleboro, MA	Stonehill	
Kennique Bonner-Steward	#7	QB	6'4, 230	(redshirt) Sophomore	Fayetteville, NC	Fayetteville State	

==== Incoming transfers ====
Over the off-season, Rhode Island added eighteen players via transfer portal.

Rhode Island incoming transfers
Name	No.	Pos.	Height/Weight	Year	Hometown	Previous school	Sources
Ja'Den McKenzie	#13	RB	6'3, 230	(redshirt) Junior	Morton, PA	West Chester	
Deon Silas	#22	RB	5'8, 175	Sophomore	Lutz, FL	Iowa State	
Brock Bethea	#71	OL	6'4, 288	Sophomore	Pinson, AL	Chattanooga	
Kevin Pyne	#75	OL	6'7, 275	(redshirt) Sophomore	Millis, MA	Boston College	
Desmond Mamudi	#95	DL	6'3, 290	(redshirt) Freshman	Tampa, FL	Virginia Tech	
Jackson Ostrowsky	#11	QB	6'0, 205	Junior	Mount Pleasant, MI	Southern Connecticut State	
Devin Hightower	#37	LB	5'11, 225	(redshirt) Junior	Twinsburg, OH	Cincinnati	
Jemeson Charlestin	#95	DL	6'1, 267	Graduate	Stamford, CT	Western Connecticut	
Jalen Brown	#9	DL	6'0, 285	(redshirt) Senior	Clinton, MD	Saint Francis	
Romello Edwards	#7	DB	6'0, 187	Graduate	Philadelphia, PA	Tennessee	
Braden Price	#4	S	6'0, 200	(redshirt) Junior	Wheeling, WV	Illinois State	
Quentin Hunter-Colvin	#5	FS	6'2, 185	(redshirt) Sophomore	Apex, NC	Monroe	
Brent Jackson	#31	S	6'2, 205	Graduate	Denton, TX	Bucknell	
Kareem Wilson	#93	DL	6'4, 255	Sophomore	Miami, FL	Florida Atlantic	
Gavin Sharkey	#87	WR	5'10, 180	Graduate	Allendale, NJ	Harvard	
Rian Black	#89	WR	6'0, 210	Sophomore	Rockledge, FL	Coastal Carolina	
Omari Walker	#81	WR	5'9, 172	(redshirt) Sophomore	McKinney, TX	Arkansas State	
Donato Crisanti	#95	LS	6'5, 243	(redshirt) Junior	North Haven, CT	Rutgers	

=== Recruiting class ===
Rhode Island signed seventeen players in the class of 2023.

College recruiting information
Name	Hometown	School	Height	Weight	Commit date
Pharrell Adams; DL	Jersey City, NJ	Henry Snyder High School	6 ft 3 in (1.91 m)	255 lb (116 kg)	Nov 19, 2022
Pharrell Adams; DL	Recruit ratings: No ratings found				
Dontay Bishop; OL	New Britain, CT	New Britain High School	6 ft 6 in (1.98 m)	315 lb (143 kg)	Dec 22, 2022
Dontay Bishop; OL	Recruit ratings: No ratings found				
Patrick Converse Jr. DL	Cumberland, RI	Cumberland High School	6 ft 3 in (1.91 m)	255 lb (116 kg)	
Patrick Converse Jr. DL	Recruit ratings: No ratings found				
Harrison Crim; OL	West Springfield, VA	West Springfield High School	6 ft 5 in (1.96 m)	295 lb (134 kg)	Dec 20, 2022
Harrison Crim; OL	Recruit ratings: No ratings found				
Emmanuel Dankwa; LB	Wayne, NJ	Wayne Hills High School	6 ft 3 in (1.91 m)	225 lb (102 kg)	Dec 13, 2022
Emmanuel Dankwa; LB	Recruit ratings: No ratings found				
Mitchell Garner; DB	Laurel, MD	St. Vincent Pallotti High School	6 ft 3 in (1.91 m)	215 lb (98 kg)	Dec 21, 2022
Mitchell Garner; DB	Recruit ratings: No ratings found				
Ethan McCann-Carter; DB	Providence, RI	St. Raphael Academy	6 ft 0 in (1.83 m)	200 lb (91 kg)	Feb 14, 2023
Ethan McCann-Carter; DB	Recruit ratings: No ratings found				
Carson Harwood; RB	West Roxbury, MA	Catholic Memorial School	6 ft 3 in (1.91 m)	220 lb (100 kg)	Dec 5, 2022
Carson Harwood; RB	Recruit ratings: No ratings found				
Case Mankins; DL	Attleboro, MA	Bishop Feehan High School	6 ft 3 in (1.91 m)	245 lb (111 kg)	Dec 19, 2022
Case Mankins; DL	Recruit ratings: No ratings found				
Moses Meus; LB	Pawtucket, RI	St. Raphael Academy	6 ft 3 in (1.91 m)	230 lb (100 kg)	Jan 7, 2023
Moses Meus; LB	Recruit ratings: No ratings found				
Curlie Spencer; DB	Melbourne, FL	Eau Gallie High School	5 ft 11 in (1.80 m)	175 lb (79 kg)	Jan 18, 2023
Curlie Spencer; DB	Recruit ratings: No ratings found				
Conner Kenyon; QB	Austin, TX	Bowie High School	6 ft 3 in (1.91 m)	190 lb (86 kg)	Jan 18, 2023
Conner Kenyon; QB	Recruit ratings: No ratings found				
Freddie Camp; DB	New Hartford, CT	Northwestern Regional High School	6 ft 1 in (1.85 m)	190 lb (86 kg)	Feb 1, 2023
Freddie Camp; DB	Recruit ratings: No ratings found				
DJ Cureton; DB	Wake Forest, NC	Heritage High School	6 ft 1 in (1.85 m)	180 lb (82 kg)	Feb 1, 2023
DJ Cureton; DB	Recruit ratings: No ratings found				
Alvarez Baker; WR	Melbourne, FL	Eau Gallie High School	5 ft 9 in (1.75 m)	180 lb (82 kg)	Feb 1, 2023
Alvarez Baker; WR	Recruit ratings: No ratings found				
Devin Walter; P	Concord, NC	Cox Mill High School	6 ft 0 in (1.83 m)	195 lb (88 kg)	Feb 1, 2023
Devin Walter; P	Recruit ratings: No ratings found				
Eddie Combs III; WR	Orlando, FL	Rockledge High School	5 ft 11 in (1.80 m)	170 lb (77 kg)	Feb 1, 2023
Eddie Combs III; WR	Recruit ratings: No ratings found				
Overall recruit ranking: 247Sports: 208
Note: In many cases, Scout, Rivals, 247Sports, On3, and ESPN may conflict in their listings of height and weight.; In these cases, the average was taken. ESPN grades are on a 100-point scale.; Sources: "2023 Team Ranking". Rivals.com.

== Schedule ==
Date	Time	Opponent	Rank	Site	TV	Result	Attendance
August 31	7:00 p.m.	at Georgia State*	No. 21	Center Parc Stadium; Atlanta, GA	ESPN+	L 35–42	15,546
September 8	7:00 p.m.	Stony Brook	No. 22	Meade Stadium; Kingston, RI	FloSports	W 35–14	N/A
September 15	6:30 p.m.	at Maine	No. 21	Alfond Stadium; Orono, ME	FloSports	W 34–17	4,813
September 23	2:00 p.m.	at No. 25 Villanova	No. 17	Villanova Stadium; Villanova, PA	FloSports	L 9–35	5,913
September 30	1:00 p.m.	Bryant*	No. 24	Meade Stadium; Kingston, RI	FloSports	W 49–26	5,676
October 7	12:00 p.m.	at Brown*		Brown Stadium; Providence, RI (rivalry)	ESPN+	W 34–30	4,124
October 14	1:00 p.m.	Richmond^{†}		Meade Stadium; Kingston, RI	FloSports	L 17–24	5,363
October 21	3:30 p.m.	at Albany		Bob Ford Field; Albany, NY	FloSports	L 10–35	5,196
October 28	1:00 p.m.	New Hampshire		Meade Stadium; Kingston, RI	FloSports	W 34–28 ^{OT}	5,162
November 11	1:00 p.m.	North Carolina A&T		Meade Stadium; Kingston, RI	FloSports	W 31–24	4,022
November 18	1:00 p.m.	at Towson		Johnny Unitas Stadium; Towson, MD	FloSports	L 30–31	3,840
*Non-conference game; ^{†}Homecoming; Rankings from STATS Poll released prior to the game; All times are in Eastern time

== Game summaries ==
=== At Georgia State ===
Game One – No. 21 Rhode Island Rams (0–0) vs (FBS) Georgia State Panthers (0–0)

Quarter	1	2	3	4	Total
No. 21 Rhode Island	0	14	14	7	35
(FBS) Georgia State	14	7	14	7	42

at Center Parc Stadium • Atlanta, Georgia

- Date: Thursday, August 31, 2023
- Game time: 7:00 p.m. EST
- Game weather: Sunny
- Game attendance: 15,546
- Referee: Marshall Lewis
- TV announcers (ESPN+): Matt Stewart, Sam Crenshaw

Game information

First quarter

- (13:36) GSU – Robert Lewis 39-yard pass from Darren Grainger, Liam Rickman kick (Drive: 4 plays, 76 yards, 1:24; Georgia State 0–7)
- (4:15) GSU – Marcus Carroll 9-yard run, Liam Rickman kick (Drive: 13 plays, 80 yards, 4:43; Georgia State 0–14)

Second quarter

- (14:10) URI – John Erby 20-yard pass from Kasim Hill, Ty Groff kick (Drive: 12 plays, 75 yards, 5:05; Georgia State 7–14)
- (11:31) GSU – Tailique Williams 42-yard pass from Darren Grainger, Liam Rickman kick (Drive: 6 plays, 67 yards, 2:39; Georgia State 7–21)
- (1:40) URI – Gabe Sloat 15-yard pass from Kasim Hill, Ty Groff kick (Drive: 5 plays, 30 yards, 1:37; Georgia State 14–21)

Third quarter

- (14:12) URI – Darius Savedge 63-yard pass from Kasim Hill, Ty Groff kick (Drive: 3 plays, 75 yards, 0:48; Tied 21–21)
- (8:02) URI – Marquis Buchanan 28-yard pass from Kasim Hill, Ty Groff kick (Drive: 9 plays, 70 yards, 4:27; Rhode Island 28–21)
- (6:21) GSU – Marcus Carroll 23-yard run, Liam Rickman kick (Drive: 5 plays, 65 yards, 1:41; Tied 28–28)
- (1:30) GSU – Gavin Pringle 21-yard interception, Liam Rickman kick (Drive: Georgia State 28–35)

Fourth quarter

- (8:16) GSU – Marcus Carroll 12-yard run, Liam Rickman kick (Drive: 4 plays, 83 yards, 1:31; Georgia State 28–42)
- (6:27) URI – Kasim Hill 5-yard run, Ty Groff kick (Drive: 3 plays, 79 yards, 1:49; Georgia State 35–42)

Statistics	URI	GSU
First downs	22	20
Plays–yards	520	424
Rushes–yards	112	231
Passing yards	408	193
Passing: comp–att–int	24–40–2	16–20–0
Time of possession	36:19	23:41

Team	Category	Player	Statistics
Rhode Island	Passing	Kasim Hill	24/40, 408 yards, 4 TD, 2 INT
Rhode Island	Rushing	Deon Silas	10 carries, 50 yards
Rhode Island	Receiving	Marquis Buchanan	2 receptions, 101 yards, TD
Georgia State	Passing	Darren Grainger	16/20, 193 yards, 2 TD
Georgia State	Rushing	Marcus Carroll	23 carries, 184 yards, 3 TD
Georgia State	Receiving	Robert Lewis	7 receptions, 97 yards, TD

=== Stony Brook ===
Game Two – No. 22 Rhode Island Rams (0–1) vs Stony Brook Seawolves (0–1)

Quarter	1	2	3	4	Total
Stony Brook	7	0	0	7	14
No. 22 Rhode Island	7	21	0	7	35

at Meade Stadium • Kingston, Rhode Island

- Date: Friday, September 8, 2023
- Game time: 7:00 p.m. EST
- Game weather: Sunny
- Referee: Joe DeAngulo
- TV announcers (FloSports): Stone Freeman, Kyle Rowley, Zach Austin
- Box score, recap

Game information

First quarter

- (6:24) URI – Darius Savedge 13-yard pass from Kasim Hill, Ty Groff kick (Drive: 11 plays, 82 yards, 5:48; Rhode Island 7–0)
- (1:21) STBK – Johnny Martin III 5-run, Spencer Biscoe kick (Drive: 9 plays, 77 yards, 4:55; Tied 7–7)

Second quarter

- (13:12) URI – Jaden Griffin 4-run, Ty Groff kick (Drive: 2 plays, 74 yards, 4:55; Rhode Island 14–7)
- (10:02) URI – Marquis Buchanan 70-yard pass from Kasim Hill, Ty Groff kick (Drive: 3 plays, 74 yards, 1:24; Rhode Island 21–7)
- (1:01) URI – Jordan Colbert 49-yard fumble recovery, Ty Groff kick (Rhode Island 28–7)

Third quarter

No scoring

Fourth quarter

- (8:21) URI – Ja'Den McKenzie 18-yard run, Ty Groff kick (Drive: 7 plays, 59 yards, 2:52; Rhode Island 35–7)
- (3:02) STBK – Jayden Cook 16-yard pass from Casey Case, Spencer Biscoe kick (Drive: 11 plays, 75 yards, 5:19; Rhode Island 35–14)

Statistics	STBK	URI
First downs	16	19
Plays–yards	61–248	61–414
Rushes–yards	109	115
Passing yards	139	299
Passing: comp–att–int	17–30–1	17–26–0
Time of possession	30:37	29:13

Team	Category	Player	Statistics
Stony Brook	Passing	Casey Case	17/30, 139 yards, 1 TD, 1 INT
Stony Brook	Rushing	Johnny Martin III	15 carries, 42 yards, 1 TD
Stony Brook	Receiving	Anthony Johnson	5 receptions, 54 yards
Rhode Island	Passing	Kasim Hill	17/25, 299 yards, 2 TDs
Rhode Island	Rushing	Jaden Griffin	10 carries, 48 yards, 1 TD
Rhode Island	Receiving	Kahtero Summers	3 receptions, 103 yards

=== Maine ===
Game Three – No. 21 Rhode Island Rams (1–1) vs Maine Black Bears (0–2)

Quarter	1	2	3	4	Total
Maine	7	10	0	0	17
No. 21 Rhode Island	3	21	3	7	34

at Meade Stadium • Kingston, Rhode Island

- Date: Saturday, September 16, 2023
- Game time: 6:30 p.m. EST
- Game weather: Cloudy
- Game attendance: 4,813
- Referee: Todd Boyd
- TV announcers (FloFootball): Jim Churchill, Bryan Stackpole
- Recap, box score

Game information

First quarter
Second quarter
Third quarter
Fourth quarter

Statistics	ME	URI
First downs	17	25
Plays–yards	56–271	74–440
Rushes–yards	84	206
Passing yards	187	234
Passing: comp–att–int	21–31–1	18–32–1
Time of possession	27:46	32:14

Team	Category	Player	Statistics
Maine	Passing	Derek Robertson	21/31, 187 yards, 1 INT
Maine	Rushing	Tristen Kenan	18 carries, 82 yards, 2 TDs
Maine	Receiving	Joe Gillette	6 receptions, 42 yards
Rhode Island	Passing	Kasim Hill	18/32, 234 yards, 2 TDs, 1 INT
Rhode Island	Rushing	Ja'Den McKenzie	17 carries, 121 yards, 1 TD
Rhode Island	Receiving	Kahtero Summers	6 receptions, 130 yards, 2 TDs

=== At No. 25 Villanova ===
Game Four – No. 17 Rhode Island Rams (2–1) vs No. 25 Villanova Wildcats (2–1)

Quarter	1	2	3	4	Total
No. 17 Rhode Island	0	3	0	6	9
No. 25 Villanova	14	7	7	7	35

at Villanova Stadium • Villanova, Pennsylvania

- Date: Saturday, September 23, 2023
- Game time: 2:00 p.m. EST
- TV announcers (FloFootball): Nick Mantegna, Steve Pinone, Tessa Peloso

Game information

First quarter
Second quarter
Third quarter
Fourth quarter

Statistics	URI	VIL
First downs		
Plays–yards		
Rushes–yards		
Passing yards		
Passing: comp–att–int		
Time of possession		

Team	Category	Player	Statistics
Rhode Island	Passing		
Rhode Island	Rushing		
Rhode Island	Receiving		
Villanova	Passing		
Villanova	Rushing		
Villanova	Receiving		

=== Bryant ===
Game Five – No. 24 Rhode Island Rams (0–0) vs Bryant Bulldogs (0–0)

Quarter	1	2	3	4	Total
Bryant	13	0	0	13	26
No. 24 Rhode Island	7	21	7	14	49

at Meade Stadium • Kingston, Rhode Island

- Date: Saturday, September 30, 2023
- Game time: 1:00 p.m. EST
- TV announcers (FloFootball): Stone Freeman

Game information

First quarter
Second quarter
Third quarter
Fourth quarter

Statistics	BRY	URI
First downs		
Plays–yards		
Rushes–yards		
Passing yards		
Passing: comp–att–int		
Time of possession		

Team	Category	Player	Statistics
Bryant	Passing		
Bryant	Rushing		
Bryant	Receiving		
Rhode Island	Passing		
Rhode Island	Rushing		
Rhode Island	Receiving		

=== At Brown ===
Game Six – Rhode Island Rams (0–0) vs Brown Bears (0–0)

Quarter	1	2	Total
Rhode Island			0
Brown			0

at Brown Stadium • Providence, Rhode Island

- Date: Saturday, October 7, 2023
- Game time: 12:00 p.m. EST
- TV announcers (ESPN+): Scott Cordischi, John Anderson, Nick Coit

Game information

First quarter
Second quarter
Third quarter
Fourth quarter

Statistics	URI	BRO
First downs		
Plays–yards		
Rushes–yards		
Passing yards		
Passing: comp–att–int		
Time of possession		

Team	Category	Player	Statistics
Rhode Island	Passing		
Rhode Island	Rushing		
Rhode Island	Receiving		
Brown	Passing		
Brown	Rushing		
Brown	Receiving		

=== Richmond ===
Game Seven– Rhode Island Rams (0–0) vs Richmond Spiders (0–0)

Quarter	1	2	Total
Richmond			0
Rhode Island			0

at Meade Stadium • Kingston, Rhode Island

- Date: Saturday, October 17, 2023
- Game time: 1:00 p.m. EST
- TV announcers (FloFootball): Stone Freeman, Kyle Rowley, Zach Austin

Game information

First quarter
Second quarter
Third quarter
Fourth quarter

Statistics	RIC	URI
First downs		
Plays–yards		
Rushes–yards		
Passing yards		
Passing: comp–att–int		
Time of possession		

Team	Category	Player	Statistics
Richmond	Passing		
Richmond	Rushing		
Richmond	Receiving		
Rhode Island	Passing		
Rhode Island	Rushing		
Rhode Island	Receiving		

=== At Albany ===
Game Eight – Rhode Island Rams (0–0) vs Albany Great Danes (0–0)

Quarter	1	2	Total
Rhode Island			0
Albany			0

at Bob Ford Field • Albany, New York

- Date: Saturday, October 21, 2023
- Game time: 3:30 p.m. EST
- Game attendance: 5,196
- TV announcers (FloSports): Michael Johnson, Jr.

Game information

First quarter
Second quarter
Third quarter
Fourth quarter

Statistics	URI	ALB
First downs		
Plays–yards		
Rushes–yards		
Passing yards		
Passing: comp–att–int		
Time of possession		

Team	Category	Player	Statistics
Rhode Island	Passing		
Rhode Island	Rushing		
Rhode Island	Receiving		
Albany	Passing		
Albany	Rushing		
Albany	Receiving		

=== New Hampshire ===
Game Nine – Rhode Island Rams (0–0) vs New Hampshire Wildcats (0–0)

Quarter	1	2	Total
New Hampshire			0
Rhode Island			0

at Meade Stadium • Kingston, Rhode Island

- Date: Saturday, October 28, 2023
- Game time: 1:00 p.m. EST
- TV announcers (FloFootball): Stone Freeman, Kyle Rowley, Zach Austin

Game information

First quarter
Second quarter
Third quarter
Fourth quarter

Statistics	UNH	URI
First downs		
Plays–yards		
Rushes–yards		
Passing yards		
Passing: comp–att–int		
Time of possession		

Team	Category	Player	Statistics
New Hampshire	Passing		
New Hampshire	Rushing		
New Hampshire	Receiving		
Rhode Island	Passing		
Rhode Island	Rushing		
Rhode Island	Receiving		

=== North Carolina A&T ===
Game Ten – Rhode Island Rams (0–0) vs North Carolina A&T Aggies (0–0)

Quarter	1	2	Total
North Carolina A&T			0
Rhode Island			0

at Meade Stadium • Kingston, Rhode Island

- Date: Saturday, November 11, 2023
- Game time: 1:00 p.m. EST
- TV announcers (FloFootball): Stone Freeman, Kyle Rowley, Zach Austin

Game information

First quarter
Second quarter
Third quarter
Fourth quarter

Statistics	NCAT	URI
First downs		
Plays–yards		
Rushes–yards		
Passing yards		
Passing: comp–att–int		
Time of possession		

Team	Category	Player	Statistics
North Carolina A&T	Passing		
North Carolina A&T	Rushing		
North Carolina A&T	Receiving		
Rhode Island	Passing		
Rhode Island	Rushing		
Rhode Island	Receiving		

=== At Towson ===
Game Eleven – Rhode Island Rams (0–0) vs Towson Tigers (0–0)

Quarter	1	2	Total
Rhode Island			0
Towson			0

at Johnny Unitas Stadium • Towson, Maryland

- Date: Saturday, November 18, 2023
- Game time: 1:00 p.m. EST
- TV announcers (YUR VA): Jay Colley, Mike Leach, Shawn Knight

Game information

First quarter
Second quarter
Third quarter
Fourth quarter

Statistics	URI	TOW
First downs		
Plays–yards		
Rushes–yards		
Passing yards		
Passing: comp–att–int		
Time of possession		

Team	Category	Player	Statistics
Rhode Island	Passing		
Rhode Island	Rushing		
Rhode Island	Receiving		
Towson	Passing		
Towson	Rushing		
Towson	Receiving		

== Rankings ==
Ranking movements Legend: ██ Increase in ranking ██ Decrease in ranking RV = Received votes т = Tied with team above or below
	Week													
Poll	Pre	1	2	3	4	5	6	7	8	9	10	11	12	Final
STATS FCS	21	22	21	17	24	RV	RV							
Coaches	23	22	20	18	RV	25т	22							

== Roster ==
2023 Rhode Island Rams football team roster
Players
Coaches
Offense

Pos.	#	Name	Class
WR	3	John Erby	Sr
WR	4	Darius Savedge	Sr
RB	5	Jaylen Smith	Jr
QB	7	Devin Farrell	Fr
QB	8	Kasim Hill	Sr
QB	9	Trevor Nored	Fr
RB	10	Ja'Den McKenzie	GS
WR	11	Omari Walker	So
WR	14	Marquis Buchanan	Fr
QB	15	Conner Kenyon	Fr
WR	16	Rian Black	Fr
WR	17	Jamall Mensah	So
WR	18	Kahtero Summers	GS
QB	19	Jackson Ostrowsky	Jr
RB	20	Deon Silas	Jr
RB	21	Jaden Griffin	Fr
RB	24	Rocco Cillino	So
RB	28	Kamalie Pemberton	Fr
RB	34	Gabe Sloat	Jr
RB	38	Carson Harwood	Fr
OL	55	Kai Rose	So
OL	60	Nick Lombardo	Fr
OL	61	Daniel Ayriyan	Sr
WR	63	Anthony Santoro	Fr
OL	64	Sebastian Delasoudas	Sr
TE	65	Jeremy Caspe	Fr
OL	67	Jordan Riendeau	Jr
OL	68	Harrison Crim	Fr
OL	70	Adam McKenna	So
OL	71	Kevin Pyne	GS
OL	72	Jacob Otts	So
OL	73	Dontay Bishop	Fr
OL	74	Tre Alexander	Fr
OL	75	Nick Correia	Sr
OL	76	Michael Scibelli	Sr
OL	77	Asa Neal	Fr
OL	78	Lorenzo Thompson	Sr
OL	79	Brock Bethea	So
WR	80	Eddie Combs III	Fr
TE	81	Tommy Smith	Jr
WR	82	Gavin Sharkey	GS
WR	83	Makai Bodden	Fr
WR	84	Jig Williams	Jr
WR	85	Alvarez Baker	Fr
WR	86	Tyler Poirier	Fr
TE	87	Hunter Hopperton	So
TE	88	Kevin Schaeffer	So
TE	89	Brady Roark	Jr

Defense

Pos.	#	Name	Class
DB	2	Jordan Colbert	GS
LB	6	Evan Stewart	Sr
LB	11	Christian Arrington	Sr
DB	13	Syeed Gibbs	Fr
DL	15	Malachi Burby	Jr
DB	22	Randy Jordan	Jr
DB	23	Romello Edwards	GS
DB	25	Frederick Mallay	Jr
DB	26	Braden Price	Jr
DB	27	Emmanuel Gomes	Jr
DB	29	Quentin Hunter-Colvin	So
DB	30	Andre DePina-Grey	Fr
DB	31	Brent Jackson	GS
DB	32	Malik Hill	So
LB	33	Mekhi Bethel	Jr
LB	35	Johnny Alvarado	Jr
LB	36	Devin Hightower	So
DB	37	Curlie Spencer	Fr
LB	39	Cole Brockwell	Jr
DB	40	D. J. Cureton	Fr
LB	42	Declan Williams	So
DB	43	Seun Filaoye	Jr
DB	44	Mitchell Garner	Fr
LB	45	A. J. Pena	So
DB	47	Jarrett Martin	Jr
LB	48	Sean Pelkisson	Jr
DL	50	Matthew Osinaga	So
DL	51	Patrick Converse	Fr
LB	52	Huriel Calice	Fr
LB	53	Moses Meus	Fr
LB	54	Emmanuel Dankwa	Fr
LB	57	Gabe Franco	Fr
DL	58	Case Mankins	Fr
LB	59	Paul Fuller	Fr
DB	62	Ethan McCann-Carter	Fr
DB	69	Jaiden Newmann-Lee	Fr
LB	90	Gabe Salomons	Jr
DL	91	Treyvon Christian	Fr
DL	92	Tosin Akinsulire	Fr
DL	93	Bless Nyanneh	Fr
DL	94	Desmond Mamudi	So
DL	96	Kareem Wilson Jr.	Fr
DL	97	Jalen Brown	GS
DL	98	Jasyn Andrews	Sr
DL	99	Westley Neal Jr.	Jr
DL		Jemeson Charlestin	GS

Special teams

Pos.	#	Name	Class
K/P	46	Will Johnson	Fr
K	46	Dylan Shank	Fr
P	49	Devin Walter	Fr
K	66	Ty Groff	Fr
LS	95	Donato Crisanti	Jr

Head coach

- Jim Fleming

Coordinators/assistant coaches

- Patrick Murphy
  Offensive coordinator/quarterbacks
- Mike Flanagan
  Associate head coach/running backs/recruiting coordinator
- Chris Bergeski
  Wide receivers
- Brendan Patterson
  Tight ends
- Eddy Morrissey
  Offensive line
- John Fils-Aime
  Offensive quality control
- Jacob Roser
  Offensive quality control
- Joshua Smith
  Offensive quality control
- Chris Lorenti
  Defensive coordinator/inside linebackers
- Marcell Lazard
  Defensive line
- Troy Gilmer
  Outside linebackers/special teams coordinator
- Brandon Napoleon
  Defensive backs
- Austin Cordova
  Defensive backs assistant/video coordinator
- Jake Fire
  Defensive quality control
- Clayton McGrath
  Defensive quality control
- Henry Yiankapolos
  Defensive assistant
- Vince Sinagra
  Chief of staff
- Robert Izzi
  Team chaplain

Legend

- (C) Team captain
- (S) Suspended
- (I) Ineligible
- Injured
- Redshirt

Roster
Last update: August 3, 2023

== Statistics ==
=== Team ===
	Rhode Island	Opp
Scoring		
Points per game		
Points per Turnovers		
First downs		
Rushing		
Passing		
Penalty		
Rushing yards		
Avg per play		
Avg per game		
Rushing touchdowns		
Passing yards		
Att-Comp-Int		
Avg per pass		
Avg per catch		
Avg per game		
Passing touchdowns		
Total offense		
Plays		
Avg per play		
Avg per game		
Fumbles-Lost		
Penalties-Yards		
Avg per game		

	Rhode Island	Opp
Punt-Yards		
Avg per play		
Avg per punt net		
Punt Return-Yards		
Avg per punt return		
Kickoffs-Yards		
Avg per play		
Avg per kick net		
Kickoff Return-Yards		
Avg per kickoff return		
Interceptions-Yards		
Avg per play		
Time of possession / game		
3rd down conversions (Pct%)	(0%)	(0%)
4th down conversions (Pct%)	(0%)	(0%)
Touchdowns scored		
Field goals-Attempts		
PAT-Attempts		
2 point conversion-attempts		
Sack by Yards		
Misc Yards		
Safeties		
Onside kicks		
Red zone scores	(0%)	(0%)
Red zone touchdowns	(0%)	(0%)
Attendance		
Date/Avg per date		
Neutral Site		

=== Individual leaders ===
Passing statistics
#	NAME	POS	RAT	CMP-ATT-INT	YDS	AVG/G	CMP%	TD	LONG
		QB	0.0	0-0-0	0 yrds		0.0%	0 TDs	0
	TOTALS		0.0	0-0-0	0 yrds	0.0	0.0%	0 TDs	0

Rushing statistics
#	NAME	POS	ATT	GAIN	AVG	TD	LONG	AVG/G
		RB	0	0 yrds	0.0	0 TDs	0	0.0
	TOTALS		0	0 yrds	0.0	0 TDs	0	0.0

Receiving statistics
#	NAME	POS	CTH	YDS	AVG	TD	LONG	AVG/G
		WR	0	0 yrds	0.0	0 TDs	0	0.0
	TOTALS		67	730 yrds	10.9	10 TDs	38	243.3

==== Defense ====
Defense statistics
#	NAME	POS	SOLO	AST	TOT	TFL-YDS	SACK-YDS	INT-YDS-TD	BU	QBH	RCV-YDS	FF	BLK	SAF
			0	0	0	0-0 yrds	0-0 yrds	-	-	-	-	-	-	-
	TOTAL		0	0	0	0-0 yrds	0-0 yrds	0-0 yrds- 0 TDs	0	0	-	0	0	-

Key: POS: Position, SOLO: Solo Tackles, AST: Assisted Tackles, TOT: Total Tackles, TFL: Tackles-for-loss, SACK: Quarterback Sacks, INT: Interceptions, BU: Passes Broken Up, PD: Passes Defended, QBH: Quarterback Hits, FR: Fumbles Recovered, FF: Forced Fumbles, BLK: Kicks or Punts Blocked, SAF: Safeties, TD : Touchdown

==== Special teams ====
Kicking/off statistics
#	NAME	POS	XPM-XPA (XP%)	FGM-FGA (FG%)	1–19	20–29	30–39	40–49	50+	PTS	LNG	KICKS	YDS	AVG	TB	OB
		PK	0-0 (0.0%)	0-0 (0.0%)	-/-	-/-	-/-	-/-	-/-	0 pts	0	0	0 yrds	0.0	0	-
	TOTALS		0-0 (0.0%)	0-0 (0.0%)	-/-	-/-	-/-	-/-	-/-	0	0	0	0 yrds	0.0	0	-

Punting statistics
#	NAME	POS	PUNTS	YDS	AVG	LONG	TB	FC	I–20	50+	BLK
		P	-	-	-	-	-	-	-	-	-
	Team	--	0	-	-	-	-	-	-	-	0
	TOTALS		0	0 yrds	0.0	0	0	0	0	0	1

Kick return statistics
#	NAME	POS	RTNS	YDS	AVG	TD	LNG
			-	-	-	-	-
	TOTALS		0	0 yrds	0.0	0 TD's	0

Punt return statistics
#	NAME	POS	RTNS	YDS	AVG	TD	LONG
			-	-	-	-	-
	TOTALS		0	0 yrds	0.0	0 TD's	0
