= Forest Park High School (Montclair, Virginia) =

Coordinates: 38°36′45.13″N 77°22′4.91″W

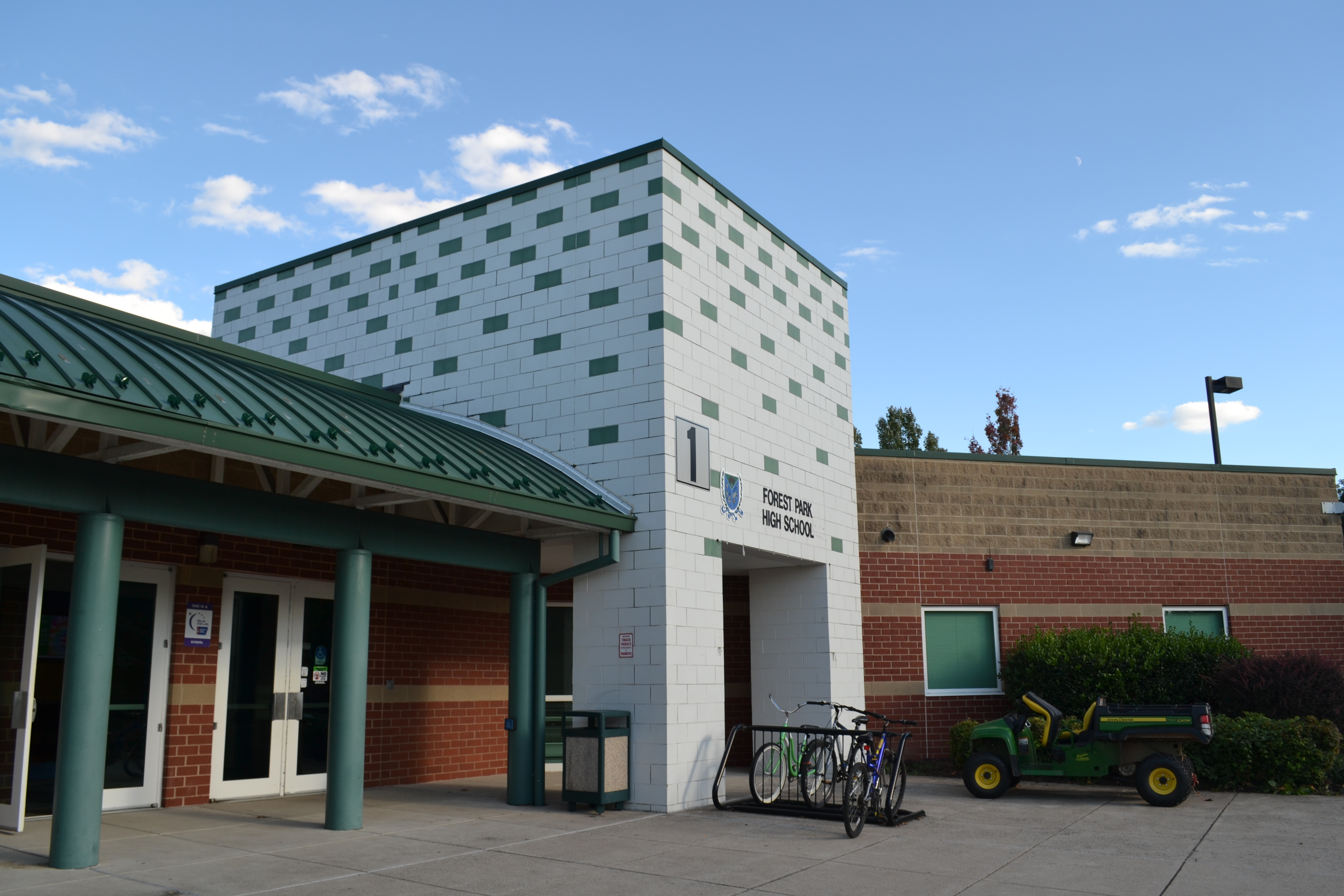

Location
- 15721 Forest Park Drive; Woodbridge, Virginia 22193

Information
- Type: Public
- Motto: Expect Excellence
- Founded: 2000
- School district: Prince William County Public Schools
- NCES School ID: 510313002542
- Principal: Richard Martinez
- Faculty: 125.88 (on FTE basis)
- Grades: 9–12
- Enrollment: 2,268 (2023-24)
- Student to teacher ratio: 18.15
- Colors: Royal blue Kelly green
- Mascot: Bruin
- Website: forestparkhs.pwcs.edu

Forest Park High School is a public high school in Montclair, unincorporated Prince William County, Virginia, United States, with a Woodbridge postal address. It is part of Prince William County Public Schools, and is located on 15721 Forest Park Drive. The school's name references adjacent Prince William Forest Park, one of the largest natural parks in the Washington metropolitan area.

Forest Park, which was opened in 2000, is the home of the first information technology (iT) specialty program in Prince William County.

In 2008 Newsweek magazine ranked Forest Park on its annual list of "America's Top Public High Schools"

As of 2025, there are 2,308 students attending Forest Park High School.

== Academics ==
=== iT program ===
Forest Park High School is a center for the iT (Information Technology) program. All interested students must apply for the program, bringing in many students from around Prince William County. There are three fields that students can enter: Computer Graphics, Networking, Programming. Each year, iT students are required to take an iT core class. Students can receive a special iT Diploma if they complete six iT courses (four core), or five iT courses and an AP class.

=== Demographics ===
In the 2017-2018 school year, Forest Park's student body was:

- 36.1% White
- 27.0% Black/African American
- 20.8% Hispanic
- 8.2% Asian
- 7.6% Two or More Races
- .2% American Indian/Alaskan
- .1% Hawaiian/Pacific Islander

=== Test scores ===
Forest Park High School is an accredited high school based on its performance on the Virginia Standards of Learning tests.

== Athletics ==
The Forest Park High School mascot and athletic emblem is the Bruin with Royal blue and Kelly green serving as its school colors. The school is a member of the AAA Cardinal District of the AAA Northwest Region of the Virginia High School League (VHSL).

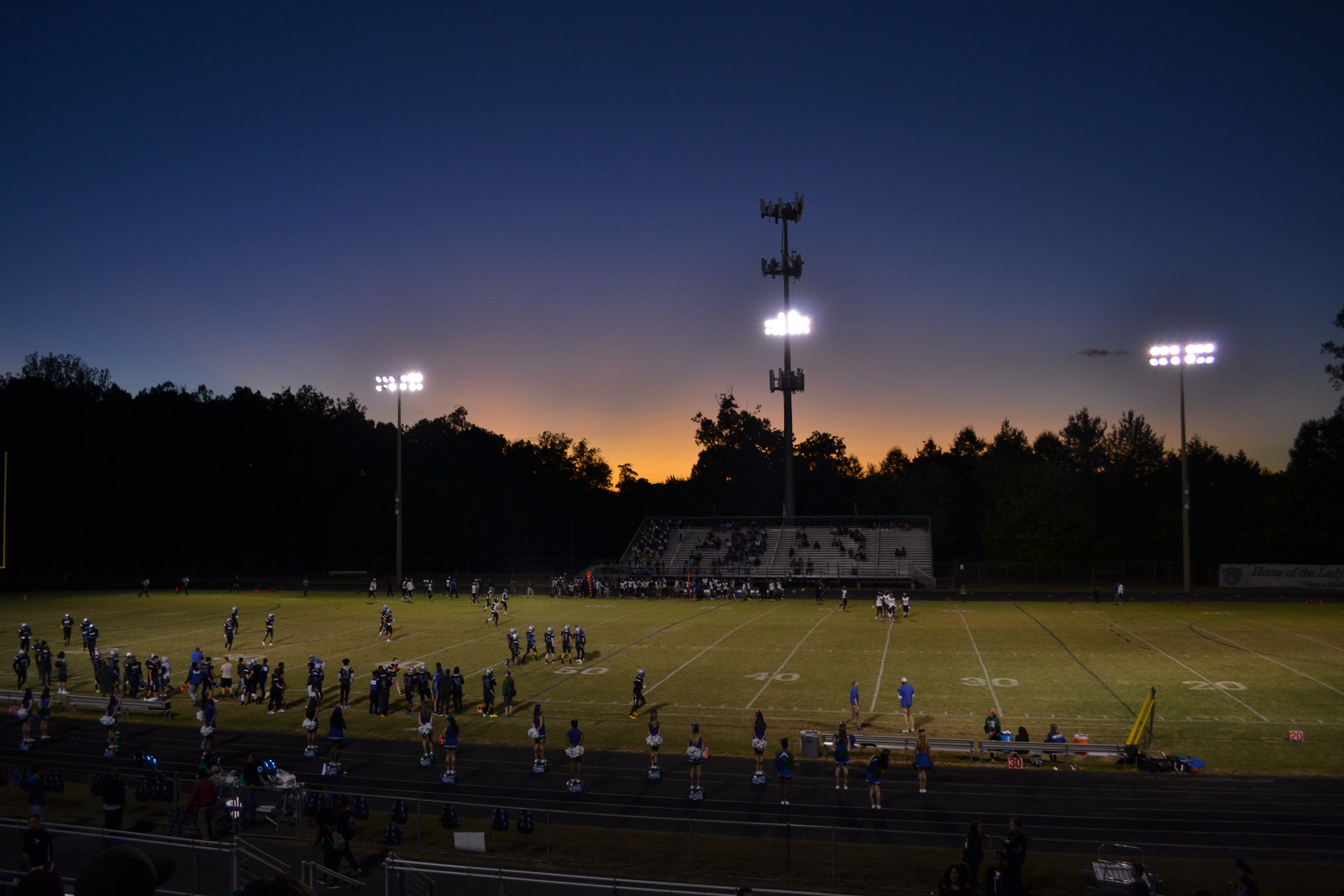
A view from the home stands of Forest Park's stadium.

=== Athletic and activities championships ===
==== State champions ====
- 2003 Girls Volleyball
- 2004, 2006 Girls Basketball
- 2013 Boys Indoor Track
- 2013 Boys Outdoor Track
- 2014 Boys Indoor Track
- 2020 CyberPatriot Virginia All Service Division
- 2021 CyberPatriot Virginia All Service Division
- 2021 CyberPatriot All Service Division National Finalists

=== Notable athletic alumni ===
- Ali Krieger, soccer player
- Thyrick Pitts, football player
- C. J. Sapong, soccer player
- Monica Wright, basketball player
- Chandler Zavala, football player

== Extracurricular activities ==
Forest Park students have the opportunity to participate in a wide variety of special interest clubs that offer activities, events and competitions, including:

- Academic Team
- America's Club
- Art Club
- Breakfast With Santa
- Chemistry Honor Society
- Chess Club
- Computer Science Team
- Cyber Club
- Dance Team
- Debate Team
- Drama Club
- D&D Club
- Earth Science Resource Club
- Edge Club
- Educators Rising
- FBLA
- Fellowship of Christian Athletes
- French Club
- French Honor Society
- International Club
- JROTC
- Key Club
- Math League
- Model UN
- Muslim Student Association
- My Little Pony Club
- National Art Honor Society
- National Honor Society
- Orchestra Club
- Physics Honor Society
- Photography Club
- Relay for Life Club
- Robotics
- Russian & German Club
- SCA
- Science National Honor Society
- Social Studies Honor Society
- Spanish Club
- Spanish Honor Society
- Spring Musical
- Student Ambassador Program
- Theater Sports
- Ursa Major Literary Magazine

=== Band ===
The Forest Park band program, a fourteen-time Virginia honor band, offers a wide variety of performing groups, both curricular and extracurricular, including:

- Concert Band
- Symphonic Band
- Wind Ensemble
- Marching Band (Forest Park High School Marching Bruin Band)
- Pep Band
- Jazz Band
- Indoor Ensembles
- Chamber Ensembles
- Marching Band
- Forest Park Combined
  - In the 2023-24 school year, Forest Park High School took over the combined indoor drumline program previously run by Woodbridge Senior High School.

=== Chorus ===
Forest Park's choir program has received regional, state, and national recognition. In 2005, the Concert Choir was awarded Overall Grand Champion at a national music festival in Orlando. In 2006 and 2008, the Concert Choir was awarded Overall Choral Champion at an international festival in New York City. In 2009, Forest Park Choirs won the Sweepstakes Award at Heritage Festivals in Atlanta. In December 2009, the choir was featured at Epcot Center at the Christmas Candlelight Processional with celebrity Narrator Whoopi Goldberg. In 2011, the Bel Canto Women’s Choir was awarded the Adjudicator’s Award at a national choral festival in New York City, while the Concert Choir and Platinum Jazz won 1st place in their categories. In 2015, Forest Park's Concert Choir returned to the Epcot Center at the Christmas Candlelight Processional with celebrity Narrator Chandra Wilson.

Ensembles in the vocal music program include:

- Platinum Vocal Jazz Ensemble
- Concert Choir
- VoiceMale
- Bel Canto
- Men's Chorus
- Varsity Women's Choir

=== Orchestra ===
- Intermediate orchestra
- Advanced orchestra
- Consort orchestra

=== Drama ===
Forest Park High School also hosts a drama club. Sponsoring three shows a year (a musical, mainstage play, and a one-act play. Forest Park has performed popular shows in the past such as Beauty and the Beast, Sweet Charity, The Wizard of Oz, Oklahoma!, Shrek The Musical, and Young Frankenstein.

== See also ==
- Prince William County Public Schools
- Virginia High School League
