= Pat Kehoe =

American football player (born 1996)

No. 12
- Position: Quarterback

Personal information
- Born: December 23, 1996 (age 29); Madison, Connecticut, U.S.
- Listed height: 6 ft 4 in (1.93 m)
- Listed weight: 235 lb (107 kg)

Career information
- High school: Cheshire Academy (CT)
- College: Delaware (2015–2019)

Patrick Kehoe (born December 23, 1996) is an American former football quarterback who played for the Delaware Fightin' Blue Hens.

== Early life ==
Kehoe was born on December 23, 1996, in Madison, Connecticut. He was part of a set of triplets. Kehoe attended Cheshire Academy where he was a four-year varsity player and three-year football starter. He was named team captain as a senior and finished his stint at the school with a record of 32–4, being named all-conference three times and leading them to New England championships in 2011 and 2013. He was the 2014 New England Offensive Player of the Year after throwing for 2,477 yards and 34 touchdowns. He threw for a total of 7,340 yards and 88 touchdowns at Cheshire.

== College career ==
Kehoe began attending the University of Delaware in 2015, and spent his first season as the third-string quarterback, not seeing any playing time. He remained in the position for the 2016 and 2017 seasons, making his debut in the latter year, when he played several snaps against Albany but attempted no passes.

Kehoe moved up from third-string to first-string in 2018, replacing J. P. Caruso as starter. He "started strong" as Blue Hens quarterback, leading them to important victories over ranked Elon and Towson. However, he was limited for the second half of the season after getting injured in their win over New Hampshire. Kehoe led the Blue Hens to the playoffs for the first time since 2010 with a 7–5 record, but his injury from the New Hampshire game, in addition to a concussion suffered the prior week against Villanova, contributed to his poor performance in the 20–6 playoff loss to James Madison. He finished the season having started all 12 games, and recorded 147 completions for 2,075 yards and 17 touchdowns.

Kehoe split time as a backup and a starter in 2019 with Nolan Henderson. He was benched for Henderson after the fourth game of the season, but later came back after Henderson got injured. Kehoe finished the season with ten games played, and posted 116 pass completions on 194 attempts for 1,335 yards and 11 touchdowns.

== Later life ==
After graduating from the University of Delaware, Kehoe coached basketball at The Winchendon School for one season and later became an employee at KeyBank.
