= Ja'Den McKenzie =

American football player (born 2000)

Personal information
- Born: February 1, 2000 (age 26); Morton, Pennsylvania, U.S.
- Listed height: 6 ft 3 in (1.91 m)
- Listed weight: 230 lb (104 kg)

Career information
- High school: Springfield (Springfield Township, Pennsylvania)
- College: West Chester (2018–2022); Rhode Island (2023)

Awards and highlights
- 3× First-Team All-PSAC East (2019, 2021, 2022); PSAC East Freshman of the Year (2019)

Ja'Den McKenzie (born February 1, 2000) is an American former college football running back. He previously played for Division II school West Chester where he became a top-ten rusher in school history before transferring to Rhode Island in 2023. He attended and played high school football for Springfield High School in Springfield Township, Pennsylvania.

At West Chester he was a three-time First-Team All-PSAC East selection and finished his career there top-fifteen in rushing touchdowns, touchdowns, and career rushing yards.

== Early life ==
McKenzie was born in Morton, Pennsylvania on February 1, 2000. He attended, played high school football and basketball for Springfield High School in Springfield Township, Pennsylvania. As a sophomore, he appeared in one game where he had one carry for 63 yards.

As a junior in 2016, he ran 236 times for 1,288 yards and 12 touchdowns.

As a senior in 2017, he ran 196 times for 1,273 yards and 18 touchdowns. He ran for 100+ yards in four games. He also caught 15 passes for 169 yards and two touchdowns. During the District I Class 5A playoffs he would be ejected and then suspended for the team's next game after two unsportsmanlike conduct personal fouls in the team's win over Haverford. The team would win 38–0 against Penncrest despite McKenzie's absence and after he returned the team would make it all the way to the quarterfinals before being eliminated by Academy Park.

== College career ==
=== West Chester ===
McKenzie committed to play college football for Division II team, West Chester in 2018. In his freshman year, he was redshirted and did not see any playing time.

As a redshirt freshman in 2019, McKenzie appeared in eleven games for the Golden Rams, starting in five of those games. He finished the year leading the team in rushing yards with 917 and touchdowns with eleven. Both being good enough for seventh and fifth respectively in the PSAC. He set the school's record for freshman rushing yards and was one rushing touchdown shy of the freshman record as well. He rushed for a season-high 179 yards on 22 carries and a pair of touchdowns against Shepherd. He scored at least two touchdowns in four of the eleven games he played in and also had four 100-yard performances on the year. He had over 100 yards and one-plus touchdown against Shippensburg, Lock Haven, and Bentley in the season-opener. He also managed two rushing touchdowns against both Gannon and Millersville. He was named PSAC Offensive Player of the Week after the team's game against Shippensburg and ECAC Rookie of the Month in October. After the season he was named First-Team All-PSAC East, PSAC East Freshman of the Year, Second-Team Don Hansen FB Gazette All-Super Region 1, and Don Hansen FB Gazette Super Region 1 Freshman of the Year.

In 2020, the PSAC postponed the 2020 season to the spring of 2021 due to COVID-19. West Chester would opt out of participating.

As a redshirt sophomore in 2021, McKenzie appeared in all eleven games and started in all but one. He finished the season third in the PSAC with 980 rushing yards which was good enough to lead all Eastern Division runners. He had the most rushing touchdowns of the whole conference with twelve which helped fuel West Chester's conference-leading ground game. He had a season-high 160 yards and one touchdown at Lock Haven and also caught a season and career-best 32-yard pass in the win. Against East Stroudsburg he had a season-long 72-yard run in a game where he rushed for 135 total yards and a touchdown. He had 70+ yards and 1+ touchdowns against Bloomsburg, Bentley, Shepherd, and Edinboro. In a game against IUP he scored a career-high three rushing touchdowns. He was named PSAC Offensive Player of the Week twice after the games against Bloomsburg and East Stroudsburg. He would once again be named First-Team All-PSAC East.

As a redshirt junior in 2022, McKenzie once again appeared in all eleven games while starting ten. He led the team in rushing for the third-straight season as he ran for 706 yards and also led the team with seven rushing touchdowns. He had a season-best 150 yards against Gannon while also running in a pair of touchdowns. That game would be his only 100-yard performance and the ninth of his career. He was two yards short of 100 yards against Lock Haven. He would rush for 70+ yards against Shippensburg and Bentley. He finished his career ranked eighth all-time in career rushing touchdowns with 30, tenth all-time in touchdowns scored with 32, and twelfth all-time in career rushing yards with 2,603. He finished as one of only nineteen running backs to pass the 2,000-yard career mark. He would earn his third, and final, First-Team All-PSAC East selection after the season.

=== Rhode Island ===
McKenzie committed to play for Rhode Island on December 19, 2022.

=== Statistics ===
Season	Games		Rushing					Receiving				
Season	GP	GS	Att	Yds	YPC	TD	YPG	Rec	Yds	YPC	TD	
2018	West Chester	DNP										
2019	West Chester	11	5	190	917	4.8	11	76.4	1	3	3.0	0
2020	West Chester	DNP										
2021	West Chester	11	10	178	980	5.5	12	89.1	4	80	20.0	1
2022	West Chester	11	10	177	706	4.0	7	64.2	9	76	8.4	1
2023	Rhode Island	11	—	130	855	6.6	13	77.7	3	51	17.0	0
Career		45	25	675	3,458	5.1	43	76.8	14	159	11.4	2

== Professional career ==
Pre-draft measurables
Height	Weight	Arm length	Hand span	40-yard dash	10-yard split	20-yard split	20-yard shuttle	Three-cone drill	Vertical jump	Broad jump	Bench press
5 ft 11 3/4 in (1.82 m)	236 lb (107 kg)	31 1/4 in (0.79 m)	9 1/4 in (0.23 m)	4.71 s	1.65 s	2.66 s	4.56 s	7.23 s	34.0 in (0.86 m)	9 ft 7 in (2.92 m)	13 reps
All values from Pro Day
