= Thyrick Pitts =

American football player (born 1999)

No. 16
- Position: Wide receiver

Personal information
- Born: April 8, 1999 (age 27); Miami, Florida, U.S.
- Listed height: 6 ft 1 in (1.85 m)
- Listed weight: 201 lb (91 kg)

Career information
- High school: Forest Park (Woodbridge, Virginia)
- College: Delaware (2017–2022)
- NFL draft: 2023: undrafted

Career history
- Chicago Bears (2023)*; New England Patriots (2023)*; Green Bay Packers (2023–2024)*
- * Offseason or practice squad member only

Awards and highlights
- Third-team All-CAA (2022); Second-team All-CAA (2021); First-team All-CAA (2020–21)
- Stats at Pro Football Reference

Thyrick Lamont Pitts Jr. (born April 8, 1999) is an American former football wide receiver. He played college football at Delaware.

== Early life ==
Pitts grew up in Manassas, Virginia and attended Phillipsburg High School before transferring to Forest Park High School during his junior year. He was a two-star rated recruit and committed to play college football at the University of Delaware over offers from Army, Cornell, Navy and Richmond.

== College career ==
During Pitts' true freshman season in 2017, he played in all 11 games but did not start any of them. During the 2018 season, he played in five games but did not start any of them, finishing the season with one tackle and one assist. He recorded two catches for 31 yards against Lafayette. During the 2019 season, he appeared in all 12 games, finishing the season with 647 receiving yards on 41 receptions, three passes for touchdowns, and one solo tackle. During the 2020-21 season, he played in and started all eight games, finishing the season with three rushing attempts for 19 yards, along with 29 receptions for 451 yards and three touchdowns. He also recorded a solo tackle. He was named on the All-CAA First Team. During the 2021 season, he played in and started 10 games, finishing the season with a rushing attempt for five yards, along with 43 receptions for 669 yards and seven touchdowns. He also recorded a solo tackle. He was named on the All-CAA Second Team. During the 2022 season, he played in and started all 13 games, finishing the season with 57 receptions for 631 yards and 10 touchdowns, along with one solo tackle. He was named on the All-CAA Third Team and a FCS ADA Academic All-Star.

== Professional career ==
Pre-draft measurables
Height	Weight	Arm length	Hand span	40-yard dash	10-yard split	20-yard split	20-yard shuttle	Three-cone drill	Vertical jump	Broad jump
6 ft 2 in (1.88 m)	201 lb (91 kg)	32 7/8 in (0.84 m)	9 7/8 in (0.25 m)	4.45 s	1.65 s	2.60 s	4.28 s	6.91 s	39 in (0.99 m)	10 ft 7 in (3.23 m)
All values from NFL Combine/Pro Day

=== Chicago Bears ===
Pitts was signed by the Chicago Bears as an undrafted free agent on May 4, 2023. He was waived on July 31, 2023.

=== New England Patriots ===
On August 1, 2023, Pitts was claimed off waivers by the New England Patriots. He joined the practice squad on August 30, 2023, but was released by the practice squad the next day.

=== Green Bay Packers ===
On December 12, 2023, Pitts was signed to the Green Bay Packers practice squad. He was signed to a reserve/future contract on January 22, 2024. He was waived on May 6, 2024, due to an injury.

On May 28, 2024, Pitts announced his retirement from football.
