= Chandler Brayboy =

American football player (born 2001)

No. 81 – New England Patriots
- Position: Wide receiver
- Roster status: Practice squad

Personal information
- Born: August 20, 2001 (age 25); Pembroke, North Carolina, U.S.
- Listed height: 6 ft 1 in (1.85 m)
- Listed weight: 199 lb (90 kg)

Career information
- High school: Purnell Swett (Pembroke)
- College: Elon (2019–2024)
- NFL draft: 2025: undrafted

Career history
- Jacksonville Jaguars (2025)*; New England Patriots (2026–present)*
- * Offseason or practice squad member only

Awards and highlights
- First-team FCS All-American (2024); CAA Special Teams Player of the Year (2024); Third-team All-CAA (2022)
- Stats at Pro Football Reference

Timothy Chandler Brayboy (born August 20, 2001) is an American professional football wide receiver for the New England Patriots of the National Football League (NFL). He played college football for the Elon Phoenix.

== Early life ==
Brayboy was born on August 20, 2001 in Pembroke, North Carolina to Selethia and Glenn Locklear. He attended Purnell Swett High School where he was a member of the Purnell Rams football, baseball and basketball teams. In football, he played wide receiver and cornerback positions from 2015–2018. He played junior varsity basketball during 2016. In varsity baseball, Brayboy played shortstop, outfielder and pitcher.

== College career ==
Brayboy played six seasons at Elon University as a wide receiver from 2019 to 2024. He redshirted almost the majority of his seasons from 2020 to 2024. In spite of this, his performances earned him accolades including All-CAA, All-Conference and various player and First Team awards.

== Professional career ==
Pre-draft measurables
Height	Weight	Arm length	Hand span	Wingspan	40-yard dash	10-yard split	20-yard split	20-yard shuttle	Three-cone drill	Vertical jump	Broad jump	Bench press
6 ft 0 1/4 in (1.84 m)	205 lb (93 kg)	31 1/2 in (0.80 m)	9 1/8 in (0.23 m)	6 ft 4 3/4 in (1.95 m)	4.47 s	1.46 s	2.52 s	4.27 s	6.90 s	37.5 in (0.95 m)	10 ft 2 in (3.10 m)	17 reps
All values from Pro Day

=== Jacksonville Jaguars ===
Brayboy signed with the Jacksonville Jaguars as an undrafted free agent following the 2025 NFL draft. He was waived on August 26, 2025, as a part of final roster cuts. Brayboy was re-signed to the team's practice squad the following day. He signed a reserve/future contract with Jacksonville on January 12, 2026.

On August 30, 2026, Brayboy was waived by the Jaguars as a part of final roster cuts.

=== New England Patriots ===
On September 14, 2026, Brayboy signed with the New England Patriots' practice squad.
