= Colby Sorsdal =

American football player (born 2000)

No. 67 – New Orleans Saints
- Position: Offensive tackle
- Roster status: Practice squad

Personal information
- Born: March 1, 2000 (age 26); Pittsburgh, Pennsylvania, U.S.
- Listed height: 6 ft 6 in (1.98 m)
- Listed weight: 315 lb (143 kg)

Career information
- High school: Mt. Lebanon (Mt. Lebanon, Pennsylvania)
- College: William & Mary (2018–2022)
- NFL draft: 2023: 5th round, 152nd overall pick

Career history
- Detroit Lions (2023–2025); Atlanta Falcons (2026)*; New Orleans Saints (2026–present)*
- * Offseason or practice squad member only

Awards and highlights
- First-team FCS All-American (2022); First-team All-CAA (2022); Third-team All-CAA (2021)

Career NFL statistics as of 2025
- Games played: 17
- Games started: 3
- Stats at Pro Football Reference

Colby Sorsdal (born March 1, 2000) is an American professional football offensive tackle for the New Orleans Saints of the National Football League (NFL). He played college football for the William & Mary Tribe.

== Early life ==
Sorsdal attended Mt. Lebanon High School in Mt. Lebanon, Pennsylvania. Sorsdal committed to play college football at the College of William & Mary over offers from Central Florida and Ball State.

== College career ==
Sorsdal started in 46 games over the course of five seasons with William & Mary. As a senior, he was named to the All-Coastal Athletic Association first team and the FCS All-American team.

== Professional career ==
Pre-draft measurables
| Height | Weight | Arm length | Hand span | Wingspan | 40-yard dash | 10-yard split | 20-yard split | 20-yard shuttle | Three-cone drill | Vertical jump | Broad jump | Bench press |
|---|---|---|---|---|---|---|---|---|---|---|---|---|
| 6 ft 5 3/4 in (1.97 m) | 301 lb (137 kg) | 33 in (0.84 m) | 10 in (0.25 m) | 6 ft 7 3/8 in (2.02 m) | 5.17 s | 1.91 s | 2.93 s | 4.70 s | 7.76 s | 27.5 in (0.70 m) | 9 ft 4 in (2.84 m) | 21 reps |
All values from Pro Day

=== Detroit Lions ===
Sorsdal was selected by the Detroit Lions in the fifth round, 152nd overall, of the 2023 NFL draft. He made his first career start Week 8 against the Las Vegas Raiders. As a rookie, Sorsdal appeared in 16 regular season games (including three starts).

On August 10, 2025, Sorsdal was placed on injured reserve due to a left leg injury suffered during a preseason matchup against the Atlanta Falcons.

On August 30, 2026, Sorsdal was waived by the Lions as a part of final roster cuts.

=== Atlanta Falcons ===
On September 21, 2026, Sorsdal signed with the Atlanta Falcons' practice squad. He was released on November 3.

=== New Orleans Saints ===
On November, 18, 2026, Sorsdal signed with the New Orleans Saints practice squad.
