= Chandler Zavala =

American football player (born 1999)

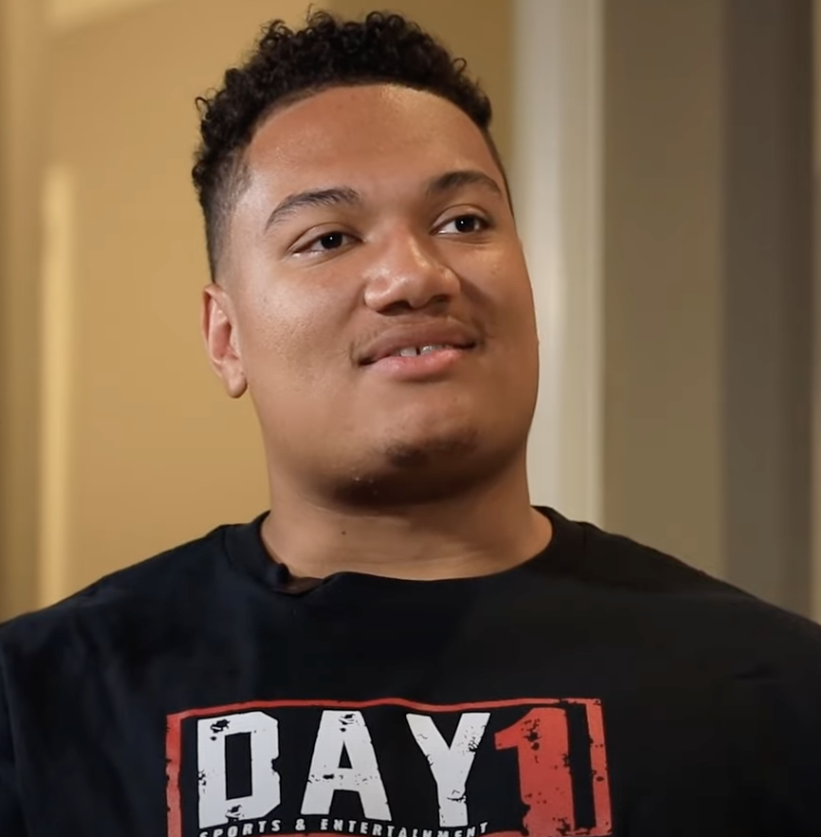
- Zavala in 2023

No. 76 – Tennessee Titans
- Position: Guard
- Roster status: Active

Personal information
- Born: April 2, 1999 (age 27); Boynton Beach, Florida, U.S.
- Listed height: 6 ft 3 in (1.91 m)
- Listed weight: 322 lb (146 kg)

Career information
- High school: Forest Park (Woodbridge, Virginia)
- College: Fairmont State (2017–2020); NC State (2021–2022)
- NFL draft: 2023: 4th round, 114th overall pick

Career history
- Carolina Panthers (2023–2026); Tennessee Titans (2026–present)

Awards and highlights
- First-team All-ACC (2022); 2× First-team All-MEC (2018, 2019)

Career NFL statistics as of 2024
- Games played: 27
- Games started: 9
- Stats at Pro Football Reference

Chandler Zavala (born April 2, 1999) is an American professional football guard for the Tennessee Titans of the National Football League (NFL). He played college football for the Fairmont State Falcons and NC State Wolfpack.

== Early life ==
Zavala was born on April 2, 1999, in Boynton Beach, Florida. He later attended Forest Park High School in Woodbridge, Virginia, where he originally played basketball before a coach advised him on playing football as it provided a better chance for him to receive an athletic scholarship.

== College career ==
Zavala played college football for the Fairmont State Fighting Falcons from 2017 until deciding to transferring due to Fairmont's 2020 season being cancelled due to the COVID-19 pandemic. He eventually chose to play for the NC State Wolfpack as his mother lived near campus. Zavala was named first-team All-Mountain East Conference with Fairmont in 2018 and 2019 and first-team All-Atlantic Coastal Conference with NC State in 2022.

== Professional career ==
Pre-draft measurables
Height	Weight	Arm length	Hand span	40-yard dash	10-yard split	20-yard split	20-yard shuttle	Three-cone drill	Vertical jump	Broad jump	Bench press
6 ft 3 1/2 in (1.92 m)	322 lb (146 kg)	32 7/8 in (0.84 m)	10 1/2 in (0.27 m)	5.23 s	1.78 s	2.88 s	4.70 s	7.58 s	32.0 in (0.81 m)	8 ft 7 in (2.62 m)	30 reps
All values from the North Carolina State Pro Day

=== Carolina Panthers ===
Zavala was selected by the Carolina Panthers in the fourth round, 114th overall, of the 2023 NFL draft. He was named the Week 1 starting right guard as a rookie, but moved to left guard the following week and started the next four games. In a Week 5 game against the Detroit Lions, Zavala suffered a neck injury in the first quarter. He was sent to a local hospital. He returned to the starting lineup in Week 11 before suffering a knee injury the following week. Zavala was placed on injured reserve on November 29, 2023.

Zavala played in Carolina's first four games of the season before he suffered a knee injury in Week 4 against the New England Patriots; he was placed on injured reserve on October 1, 2025. He was activated on November 1, ahead of the team's Week 9 matchup against the Green Bay Packers. Zavala was placed back on injured reserve on November 29 after suffering a calf injury in Week 12 against the San Francisco 49ers.

On August 31, 2026, Zavala was waived by the Panthers. The following day, Carolina re–signed Zavala to their practice squad. On September 29, he was released from the practice squad.

=== Tennessee Titans ===
On October 6, 2026, Zavale signed with the Tennessee Titans practice squad. He was promoted to the active roster on November 14.

== Personal life ==
Zavala's father, Demetrio, is a frequent contestant on the Food Network competitive cooking show Chopped.
