= Owen Wright (American football) =

American football player (born 1999)

No. 30 – Las Vegas Raiders
- Position: Running back
- Roster status: Practice squad

Personal information
- Born: February 28, 1999 (age 27); Bethesda, Maryland, U.S.
- Listed height: 5 ft 9 in (1.75 m)
- Listed weight: 217 lb (98 kg)

Career information
- High school: Georgetown Preparatory School (Bethesda)
- College: William & Mary (2017–2020); Monmouth (2021–2022)
- NFL draft: 2023: undrafted

Career history
- Baltimore Ravens (2023–2024); Tampa Bay Buccaneers (2025); Houston Texans (2026)*; Las Vegas Raiders (2026–present)*
- * Offseason or practice squad member only

Awards and highlights
- First-team All-CAA (2022)

Career NFL statistics as of 2025
- Rushing yards: 6
- Rushing average: 2
- Return yards: 73
- Stats at Pro Football Reference

Owen Wright (born February 28, 1999) is an American professional football running back for the Las Vegas Raiders of the National Football League (NFL). He played college football for the William & Mary Tribe and Monmouth Hawks.

== Early life ==
Wright grew up in Bethesda, Maryland and attended Georgetown Preparatory School. In his high school career, he completed 2,078 rushing yards with 33 touchdowns averaging 5.4 yards per carry. He earned first-team All-IAC and second-team all-state as a junior and earned second-team All-IAC as a senior. He was an unranked running back recruit and committed to play college football at the College of William & Mary.

== College career ==
=== William & Mary ===
Wright was redshirted during his true freshman season in 2017. During the 2018 season, he appeared in all 10 games and finished the season with 117 rushing yards on 45 carries making him rank third on the team. He was ranked sixth in the conference in yards per return with 22.9. During the 2019 season, he appeared in all 12 games and started six of them. He finished the season with 584 rushing yards on 138 carries with five touchdowns averaging 48.7 rushing yards per game and 4.2 yards per carry. He also totaled 13 receptions for 97 yards. During the 2020 season, he appeared in the season opener against Richmond where he rushed for 28 yards on nine carries.

After the 2020 season, Wright announced that he would be transferring to Monmouth.

=== Monmouth ===
During the 2021 season, Wright appeared in all 11 games and started one of them. He finished the season with 91 carries for 370 rushing yards and two touchdowns. He also made seven receptions for 51 yards and a touchdown. During the 2022 season, he played in all 11 games at running back and on special teams. He finished the season with 72 carries for 304 rushing yards and 16 touchdowns. He also made two receptions for 28 yards and a touchdown.

== Professional career ==
Pre-draft measurables
Height	Weight	Arm length	Hand span	Wingspan	40-yard dash	10-yard split	20-yard split	20-yard shuttle	Three-cone drill	Vertical jump	Bench press
5 ft 9 in (1.75 m)	214 lb (97 kg)	30 1/4 in (0.77 m)	10 in (0.25 m)	6 ft 2 in (1.88 m)	4.56 s	1.53 s	2.60 s	4.13 s	7.04 s	34.0 in (0.86 m)	16 reps
All values from Pro Day

=== Baltimore Ravens ===
On April 29, 2023, Wright was signed to the Baltimore Ravens as an undrafted free agent after going unselected in the 2023 NFL draft. He was waived on August 29, but he was re-signed on the practice squad two days later. Wright was promoted from the practice squad on October 28. He signed a reserve/future contract with Tampa Bay on January 29, 2024. He was placed on injured reserve on August 27.

=== Tampa Bay Buccaneers ===
On July 31, 2025, Wright signed with the Tampa Bay Buccaneers. He was waived on August 26 as part of final roster cuts. On October 7, Wright was re-signed to the practice squad. He was promoted to the active roster on November 14. Wright was waived on November 29, and was subsequently re-signed to the team's practice squad.

On January 8, 2026, Wright signed a reserve/futures contract with the Buccaneers. He was waived by Tampa Bay on May 11.

=== Houston Texans ===
On August 8, 2026, Wright signed with the Houston Texans. On August 29, he was waived by the Texans as a part of final roster cuts.

=== Las Vegas Raiders ===
On September 30, 2026, Wright was signed to the Las Vegas Raiders' practice squad.

== NFL career statistics ==
Year	Team	Games		Rushing					Receiving					Kick returns					Fumbles	
Year	Team	GP	GS	Att	Yds	Avg	Lng	TD	Rec	Yds	Avg	Lng	TD	Ret	Yds	Avg	Lng	TD	Fum	Lost
2023	BAL	1	0	—	—	—	—	—	—	—	—	—	—	—	—	—	—	—	—	—
2024	BAL	0	0	Did not play due to injury																
2025	TB	3	0	3	6	2.0	4	0	—	—	—	—	—	3	73	24.3	28	0	0	0
Career		4	0	3	6	2.0	4	0	—	—	—	—	—	3	73	24.3	28	0	0	0

== Personal life ==
Wright is the grandson of late former Washington Redskins safety, Brig Owens.
