= Nolan Henderson =

American football player (born 1998)

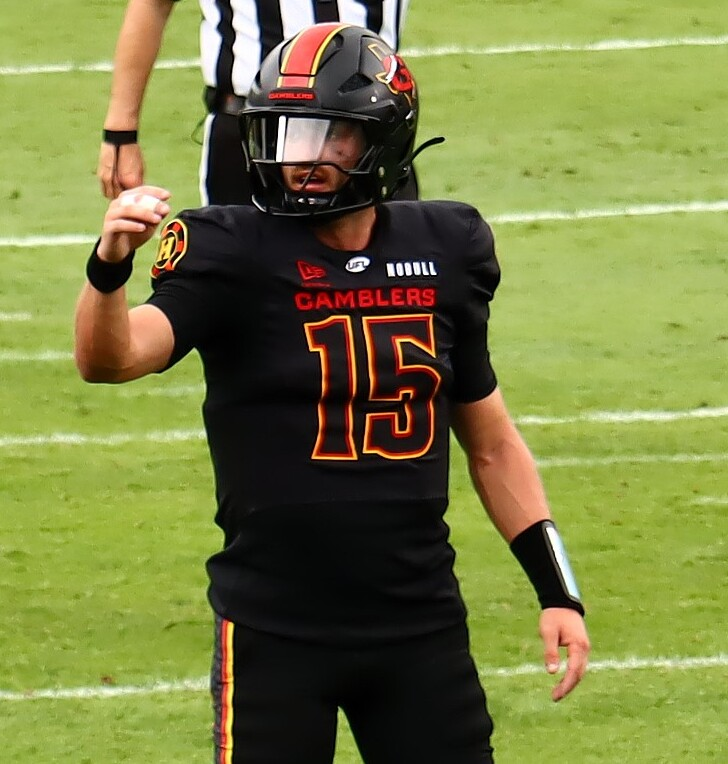
- Henderson with the Houston Gamblers in 2026

No. 15
- Position: Quarterback

Personal information
- Born: June 26, 1998 (age 28)
- Listed height: 5 ft 11 in (1.80 m)
- Listed weight: 195 lb (88 kg)

Career information
- High school: Smyrna (Smyrna, Delaware)
- College: Delaware (2017–2022)
- NFL draft: 2023: undrafted

Career history
- Baltimore Ravens (2023)*; Houston Roughnecks / Gamblers (2024–2026)
- * Offseason or practice squad member only

Awards and highlights
- First-team All-CAA (2020–2021); Second-team All-CAA (2022)

Career UFL statistics as of Week 2, 2026
- Passing yards: 929
- Completion percentage: 57.0
- TD–INT: 4-3
- Passer rating: 77.5
- Rushing yards: 256
- Rushing touchdowns: 1

Nolan Michael Henderson (born June 26, 1998) was an American former professional football quarterback. He played college football for the Delaware Fightin' Blue Hens.

== Early life ==
Henderson was born on June 26, 1998, and is a native of Smyrna, Delaware. He attended Smyrna High School and was a three-year starter and two-time team captain. In his final two seasons, Henderson led them to an overall record of 24–1 and the school's first two state championships, while throwing for 5,614 yards and 68 touchdowns. He was twice named first-team all-state, set several state records, including career passing touchdowns (104), single season passing yards (3,380) and passing touchdowns (36), and in 2016 was given the Maxwell Jim Henry Award for best player in Delaware, as well as Gatorade State Player of the Year and DIFCA Offensive Player of the Year honors. At the annual Delaware High School All-Star game in June 2017, Henderson was named most valuable player after leading the gold team to a 44–0 victory.

In addition to football, Henderson also started four years on the Smyrna High School baseball team as an outfielder, playing under his father who was the head coach.

== College career ==
After visiting several schools in the Colonial Athletic Association (CAA), Henderson announced his commitment to play college football for the Delaware Fightin' Blue Hens. As a true freshman in 2017, Henderson saw no game action, being a redshirt and operating the scout team. The following season, he appeared in a total of three games, making his collegiate debut against Lafayette and seeing the most action against Villanova, where he threw a touchdown pass after coming in for the injured Pat Kehoe. On the season, he completed 12-of-20 passes for 152 yards and one touchdown, in addition to rushing for 36 yards.

Four games into the 2019 season, Henderson was named starter, replacing Kehoe and becoming the first starting quarterback for the Blue Hens from a Delaware school since Sam Postlethwait in 2001. In his first career start, against Penn, he threw for three touchdowns and 260 yards. He finished the season having played in nine games, and recorded 71 pass completions on 126 attempts for 933 yards.

Henderson became a full-time starter in the 2020–21 season, being team captain and throwing for 1,482 yards and 10 touchdowns in eight games. He led them to a 7–1 mark and set the school record with a 70.7 completion percentage, helping them reach the NCAA semifinals. His completion percentage ranked first in the CAA and third in the FCS, and he was named first-team all-conference.

In 2021, Henderson started the first four games before suffering a season-ending abdominal injury. In four games, he went 47-of-80 passing for 646 yards and four touchdowns. He posted his best year as a senior in 2022, setting the single-season school record for passing touchdowns with 32 while completing 285-of-442 passes for 3,216 yards, the latter of which was the third best mark in Delaware history. He was named second-team All-CAA, and led Delaware to the FCS playoffs, where they lost to eventual national champion South Dakota State 42–6, in a game that saw Henderson break his fibula on the first drive.

Although Henderson had one year of eligibility remaining coming into 2023, he opted to declare for the NFL draft. He finished his college career second all-time in Delaware history for touchdown passes (56), and completed 550-of-850 pass attempts for 6,429 yards. Additionally, he ran for 418 yards, scoring eight times.

== Professional career ==
Pre-draft measurables
Height	Weight	Arm length	Hand span	Wingspan	40-yard dash	10-yard split	20-yard split	20-yard shuttle	Three-cone drill	Vertical jump	Broad jump
5 ft 11 1/2 in (1.82 m)	202 lb (92 kg)	29 3/4 in (0.76 m)	8 5/8 in (0.22 m)	5 ft 11 1/4 in (1.81 m)	4.55 s	1.65 s	2.62 s	4.27 s	7.16 s	31.5 in (0.80 m)	9 ft 6 in (2.90 m)
All values from Pro Day

=== Baltimore Ravens ===
After going unselected in the 2023 NFL draft, Henderson was signed by the Baltimore Ravens as an undrafted free agent on May 5, 2023. He was released by the Ravens on June 6.

=== Houston Roughnecks / Gamblers ===
On January 22, 2024, Henderson signed with the Houston Roughnecks of the United Football League (UFL). He re-signed with the team on September 18.

On February 16, 2026, Henderson signed with the rebranded Houston Gamblers of the United Football League, after he had initially gone unassigned in the 2026 UFL draft. Henderson earned UFL player of the week honors for his Week 2 appearance against the Birmingham Stallions, where he led the Gamblers to an upset victory.

On July 18, 2026, Henderson confirmed his retirement from professional football.

== Career statistics ==
=== UFL ===
Year	Team	Games			Passing									Rushing				
Year	Team	GP	GS	Record	Cmp	Att	Pct	Yds	Y/A	Lng	TD	Int	Rtg	Att	Yds	Avg	Lng	TD
2024	HOU	6	2	0–2	43	74	58.1	526	7.1	63	2	1	83.5	22	143	6.5	20	1
2025	HOU	4	1	0–1	20	36	55.6	183	5.1	29	2	0	88.1	9	82	9.1	33	0
2026	HOU	5	4	1–3	40	70	57.1	447	6.4	33	0	2	64.4	16	105	6.6	37	1
Career		15	7	1–6	103	180	57.2	1,156	6.4	63	4	3	77.0	47	330	7.0	37	2

=== College ===
Year	Team	Games		Passing								Rushing			
Year	Team	GP	Record	Comp	Att	Pct	Yards	Avg	TD	Int	Rate	Att	Yards	Avg	TD
2017	Delaware	DNP													
2018	Delaware	3	0–0	12	20	60.0	152	7.6	1	0	140.3	10	36	3.6	0
2019	Delaware	9	2–4	71	126	56.3	933	7.4	9	1	140.5	71	126	2.5	1
2020	Delaware	8	7–1	135	191	70.7	1,482	7.8	10	4	148.9	72	101	1.4	2
2021	Delaware	4	3–1	47	80	58.8	646	8.1	4	0	143.1	23	-57	-2.5	1
2022	Delaware	13	8–5	285	442	64.5	3,231	7.3	32	9	145.7	94	149	1.6	4
Career		37	20−11	550	859	64.0	6,444	7.5	56	14	145.3	270	355	1.3	8

== Personal life ==
Henderson grew up a Delaware fan and his childhood dream was to play for the school; his family held season tickets for several years.
