= Kasim Hill =

American football player (born 1997)

No. 11, 20, 8
- Position: Quarterback

Personal information
- Born: December 9, 1997 (age 28); Washington, D.C., U.S.
- Listed height: 6 ft 2 in (1.88 m)
- Listed weight: 234 lb (106 kg)

Career information
- High school: Gilman (Baltimore, Maryland); St. John's College (Washington, D.C.)
- College: Maryland (2017–2018); Tennessee (2019); Rhode Island (2020–2023)
- Stats at ESPN

Kasim Ajani Hill (born December 9, 1997) is an American former college football player who was a quarterback for the Maryland Terrapins, Tennessee Volunteers, and Rhode Island Rams.

In Hill's first season with the Rams in 2020, he led the team to back-to-back upset wins against ranked opponents. In 2021 he led the team to a 7–4 record, was a two-time CAA Offensive Player of the Week and won the NEFWA Gold Helmet Award. The following year the team repeated with the same record and won their fourth consecutive Governor's Cup and Hill's second consecutive. He beat all statistical career-highs in 2022 as the team was short of a playoff appearance, following the season he was granted his seventh, and final, year of eligibility.

== Early life ==
Hill was born on December 9, 1997, in Washington, D.C. He started his high school football career with Gilman School in Baltimore, Maryland, before transferring to St. John's College High School in Washington, D.C. Coming out of St. John's College he was a consensus four-star recruit, according to all major recruiting databases and was ranked the 93rd-ranked overall player in the class of 2017 by Rivals.com. He was named the 2017 Gatorade Player of the Year for Washington, D.C. as well as playing for Team Armour in the 2017 Under Armour All-American Game. At The Opening's Washington, D.C. Regional he earned quarterback honors.

As a junior at Gilman School he was an All-MIAA selection and an honorable mention all-state.

As a senior in 2016, Hill moved to St. John's College, where he was an American Family/USA Today All-USA Washington, D.C. First Team, Washington Post All-Metro Honorable Mention, and WCAC All-Conference Third Team selection. He threw for 1,431 yards and 16 touchdowns and rushed for 885 yards and ten touchdowns. He led the Cadets to an 8–4 record and an appearance in the WCAC championship game. He received offers from Michigan, Penn State, and Michigan State but ultimately chose to play for Maryland.

College recruiting
Name	Hometown	School	Height	Weight	Commit date
Kasim Hill; QB	Washington, D.C.	St. John's College High School	6 ft 2 in (1.88 m)	223 lb (101 kg)	Apr 9, 2016
Kasim Hill; QB	Recruit ratings: Scout: Rivals: 247Sports: ESPN:				
Overall recruit ranking: 247Sports: 233
Note: In many cases, Scout, Rivals, 247Sports, On3, and ESPN may conflict in their listings of height and weight.; In these cases, the average was taken. ESPN grades are on a 100-point scale.; Sources: "2017 Team Ranking". Rivals.com.

== College career ==
=== Maryland ===
As a freshman in 2017, Hill played in three games for the Terrapins, starting two. He made his college football debut on the road against No. 23 Texas in relief of injured Tyrrell Pigrome. Hill closed out the victory by completing all three of his pass attempts and rushing for a touchdown. He made his first start against Towson the following week. In the team's 63–17 win he went 13 of 16 for 163 yards and two touchdowns, the first of which being a nine yard pass to D. J. Moore. He started the following week against UCF, completing both of his attempts before suffering a season-ending injury.

In Hill's redshirt freshman season, he started the first ten games of the season for Maryland. He started the season against No. 23 Texas with a win where he completed 17 passes for 222 yards and a career-long completion of 65 yards to Jeshaun Jones. He started the season throwing 84 pass attempts before throwing his first interception against Temple, which was the longest streak for a Terrapin's quarterback since Danny O'Brien in 2010. On the season he completed 84 of 170 pass attempts for 1,083 passing yards alongside nine touchdowns and four interceptions. In a game against Illinois he threw for a career-high 265 passing yards and three touchdowns. He tied his career-high of three touchdowns again in a game against Rutgers. After the season Hill entered the transfer portal.

=== Tennessee ===
On August 22, 2019, Hill transferred to Tennessee. However, due to NCAA transfer rules, he did not play for Tennessee in 2019 and instead played for the Volunteers' scout team. After the season Hill entered the transfer portal for a second time.

=== Rhode Island ===
On November 28, 2020, Hill transferred to Rhode Island. In his redshirt junior season, he played in all three games for the Rams. He made his debut against No. 6 Villanova after the team's original season-opener against Bryant was postponed. Against the Wildcats he went 18 of 28 for 246 yards and ran for 36 yards and the game-winning touchdown in overtime. The next week against No. 18/19 Albany he went 13 of 25 for 118 yards and one touchdown, and once again ran for the game-winning touchdown in overtime. In the season finale against No. 9 Delaware he went five of ten for 26 yards and one touchdown in the loss. He was benched late in the third quarter for fellow redshirt sophomore Brandon Robinson.

In Hill's redshirt junior season, this time the fall 2021 season, he started every game for the Rams. In the first game of the season he completed 12 of 18 passes for 249 yards and two touchdowns while rushing for 33 yards and another touchdown in a 45–21 win against Bryant. The team won again next week against Albany as Hill went 15 of 29 for 147 yards. The Rams and Hill won a third straight as he threw for 320 yards and three passing touchdowns and rushing for another to secure the Governor's Cup against Brown. After his performance he was named the CAA Offensive Player of the Week and NEFWA Golden Helmet Award winner. The following game against Stony Brook he went 21 of 37 for a touchdown and he ran for 66 yards and another touchdown, both scores coming in the fourth quarter. He won back-to-back CAA Football Offensive Player of the Week honors after that performance. He led an upset win over No. 9 Delaware for the team's fifth straight win to start out 5–0. Hill then struggled for the next two weeks as the team lost three in a row to Towson, Villanova, and Maine. He had a bounce-back game against Maine despite the loss as he threw for three touchdowns on 11 of 20 passing. The Rams and Hill upset FBS opponent UMass in Warren McGuirk Alumni Stadium 35–22 as he threw for 169 yards on 11 of 20 passing alongside two touchdowns, he also tallied two more rushing touchdowns. The team beat New Hampshire after a four touchdown day from Hill, before dropping the last game of the season to Elon, where he went 31-for-55 for 394 yards and three touchdowns in a 28–43 loss to Davis Cheek and Elon, finishing the year at 7–4.

In Hill's redshirt senior season, he was voted as team captain by teammates. He started all 11 games for the Rams and he helped lead them to the third-highest scoring offense in the CAA (30.6). Hill started off the year going 17 of 32 for 236 yards, two touchdowns, and no interceptions against Stony Brook. The next week he went 14 of 20 for 290 yards and two touchdowns against Bryant while surpassing 3,000 career passing yards at URI. The team lost back-to-back games against Delaware and FBS opponent Pittsburgh. Hill led the Rams past Brown to capture their fourth-straight Governor's Cup win. In that game he was responsible for 331 yards of total offense and two touchdowns. The next week the Rams beat Elon, and then Hill threw for 352 yards, three touchdowns, and a rushing touchdown against Monmouth in seven overtimes. The team lost by one point to William & Mary while he once again threw for two touchdowns and rushed for another. Finishing out the year the team beat Maine, lost to New Hampshire, and on senior night they beat Albany 35–21. In the final game of his career he threw for 105 yards and two touchdowns to cap off the year in which he threw for 2,588 yards, 19 touchdowns and seven interceptions for his best season.

On February 3, 2023, Hill was granted his seventh year of eligibility. In the 2023 season-opener, he threw for 408 yards and a career-high four touchdowns in the 35–42 loss against Georgia State.

=== Statistics ===
Year	Team	Games			Passing								Rushing			
Year	Team	GP	GS	Record	Comp	Att	Pct	Yards	Avg	TD	Int	Rate	Att	Yards	Avg	TD
2017	Maryland	3	2	1–1	18	21	85.7	230	11.0	2	0	209.1	12	60	5.0	1
2018	Maryland	10	10	5–5	84	170	49.5	1,083	6.4	9	4	115.7	40	−15	−0.4	0
2019	Tennessee	DNP														
2020	Rhode Island	3	3	2–1	36	63	57.1	389	6.2	2	2	113.1	33	49	1.5	2
2021	Rhode Island	11	11	7–4	150	282	53.2	2,170	7.7	18	6	134.6	113	261	2.3	6
2022	Rhode Island	11	11	7–4	177	327	54.1	2,592	7.9	19	7	135.6	107	268	2.5	7
2023	Rhode Island	11	11	6–5	221	327	59.2	3,074	8.2	18	10	158.6	88	56	0.6	3
Career		39	38	28–20	686	1,190	57.6	9,538	8.0	68	29	139.0	393	679	1.7	19

== Professional career ==
Pre-draft measurables
Height	Weight	Arm length	Hand span	40-yard dash	10-yard split	20-yard split	Three-cone drill	Vertical jump	Broad jump
6 ft 1 5/8 in (1.87 m)	239 lb (108 kg)	31 in (0.79 m)	8 in (0.20 m)	5.05 s	1.72 s	2.81 s	7.81 s	27.0 in (0.69 m)	8 ft 5 in (2.57 m)
All values from Pro Day

== Personal life ==
Hill is the son of Joe and Michele Hill. He has a younger sister, Kaylah, who has Down syndrome. He is known to volunteer for feeding the homeless, mentoring for elementary students, and raising funds for the National Down Syndrome Society (NDSS).
