= Ajani Cornelius =

American football player (born 2002)

No. 74 – Philadelphia Eagles
- Position: Offensive tackle
- Roster status: Active

Personal information
- Born: May 21, 2002 (age 24); Harlem, New York, U.S.
- Listed height: 6 ft 5 in (1.96 m)
- Listed weight: 318 lb (144 kg)

Career information
- High school: Archbishop Stepinac (White Plains, New York)
- College: Rhode Island (2020–2022); Oregon (2023–2024)
- NFL draft: 2025: 6th round, 204th overall pick

Career history
- Dallas Cowboys (2025–2026); Philadelphia Eagles (2026–present)

Awards and highlights
- Second-team All-American (2024); First-team All-CAA (2022); Third-team All-Big Ten (2024)

Career NFL statistics as of Week 10, 2026
- Games played: 4
- Stats at Pro Football Reference

Ajani James Cornelius (born May 21, 2002) is an American professional football offensive tackle for the Philadelphia Eagles of the National Football League (NFL). He played college football for the Rhode Island Rams and Oregon Ducks. Cornelius was selected by the Cowboys in the sixth round of the 2025 NFL draft.

== Early life ==
Cornelius attended Archbishop Stepinac High School in White Plains, New York. During his time there he was a back-to-back state and league champion in both 2018 and 2019, he also was named team captain and the 2019 Catholic High School Football League (CHSFLAAA) Offensive Lineman of the Year. Cornelius committed to the University of Rhode Island on February 3, 2020.

== College career ==
=== Rhode Island ===
Cornelius made his collegiate debut at right tackle against No. 11 Delaware Fightin' Blue Hens in reserve during the 2020–21 spring season.

In first fall season as a freshman, he started all eleven games for the Rams. His first start came against the Bryant Bulldogs where the team rushed for a season-high 235 yards without allowing a single sack in a 45–21 win. He helped lead the Rams to average 133.6 rushing yards per game.

In 2022, Cornelius once again started all eleven games for the Rams. He helped the team have eight games where the team tallied over 150 yards, including 288 yards and three touchdown against the team's rival Brown. The team ranked fifth in the Colonial Athletic Association (CAA) sacks allowed with 21. The team also finished fourth in the CAA in both rushing yards per game with 168.8, and in passing yards per game with 235.5, alongside also being the third-highest scoring offense averaging 30.6 points per game. After the season, Cornelius received First Team All-CAA football honors. He entered the transfer portal on December 1, 2022.

=== Oregon ===
On December 21, 2022, Cornelius transferred to the University of Oregon to play for the Ducks under coach Dan Lanning. Prior to the season, he was named as an honorable mention for the preseason All Pac-12 team.

== Professional career ==
Pre-draft measurables
Height	Weight	Arm length	Hand span	Wingspan	Vertical jump	Broad jump
6 ft 4 5/8 in (1.95 m)	310 lb (141 kg)	33 1/2 in (0.85 m)	9 1/2 in (0.24 m)	6 ft 10 in (2.08 m)	29.5 in (0.75 m)	8 ft 9 in (2.67 m)
All values from NFL Combine/Pro Day

=== Dallas Cowboys ===
Cornelius was selected by the Dallas Cowboys with the 204th overall pick in the sixth round of the 2025 NFL draft. On November 17, 2025, Cornelius was placed on injured reserve due to a knee injury.

On November 17, 2026, Cornelius was waived by the Cowboys.

=== Philadelphia Eagles ===
On November 18, 2026, Cornelius was claimed off waivers by the Philadelphia Eagles.
