= Ed Lee (American football) =

American football player (born 1999)

Profile
- Position: Wide receiver

Personal information
- Born: May 29, 1999 (age 27); Washington, D.C., U.S.
- Listed height: 5 ft 10 in (1.78 m)
- Listed weight: 185 lb (84 kg)

Career information
- High school: St. John's College (Washington, D.C.)
- College: Rhode Island (2017–2022)
- NFL draft: 2023: undrafted

Career history
- New England Patriots (2023)*; BC Lions (2024–2025)*
- * Offseason or practice squad member only

Awards and highlights
- Second-team All-CAA (2022); Third-team All-CAA (2022)
- Stats at Pro Football Reference

Ed Lee (born May 29, 1999) is an American football wide receiver. He played college football for the Rhode Island Rams. He is the son of former NFL wide receiver Edward Lee.

== College career ==
Lee played college football at the University of Rhode Island from 2017 to 2022. In his redshirt senior season with the Rams, he earned second-team All-CAA honors and a receiver and third-team honors as a punt returner. He caught 56 passes for 908 yards and five touchdowns.

=== Statistics ===
Year	Team	Games	Receiving						Rushing			
Year	Team	GP	Rec	Yds	TD	Long	Avg/C	Avg/G	Att	Yards	Avg	TD
2017	Rhode Island	DNP										
2018	Rhode Island	3	0	0	0	0	0.0	0.0	0	0	0.0	0
2019	Rhode Island	11	4	45	1	16	11.3	4.1	0	0	0.0	0
2020–21	Rhode Island	3	10	144	0	62	14.4	48.0	1	-4	-4.0	0
2021	Rhode Island	9	16	165	2	34	10.3	18.3	0	0	0.0	0
2022	Rhode Island	11	56	908	5	78	16.2	82.5	1	0	0.0	0
Career		37	86	1,262	8	78	14.7	34.1	2	-4	-2.0	0

== Professional career ==
Pre-draft measurables
Height	Weight	Arm length	Hand span	40-yard dash	10-yard split	20-yard split	Vertical jump	Broad jump
5 ft 8 in (1.73 m)	180 lb (82 kg)	29 7/8 in (0.76 m)	9 in (0.23 m)	4.50 s	1.53 s	2.60 s	34 1/2 in (0.88 m)	9 ft 11 in (3.02 m)
All values from pro day

=== New England Patriots ===
After going undrafted in the 2023 NFL draft, Lee signed with the New England Patriots on June 5, 2023. He was released on August 2, 2023.

=== Orlando Guardians/BC Lions ===
On December 14, 2023, Lee signed a non-binding letter of intent with the Orlando Guardians of the XFL. On December 20, 2023, Lee signed with the BC Lions. He was released by the Lions on June 2, 2024.

On January 10, 2025, Lee re-signed with the Lions, in advance of their pre-season training camp. He was released on May 14, 2025.
