= Tipson =

Tipson is a surname. Notable people with the surname include:

- Baird Tipson (born 1943), American academic and college administrator
- Ernest Tipson (1883–1958), English Protestant missionary and linguist

== See also ==
- Murder of Jane Tipson
- Tipton (surname)
