= Tipton (disambiguation) =

Tipton is a town in the West Midlands, England.

Tipton may also refer to:

== Places ==
=== Australia ===
- Tipton, Queensland, a locality in the Toowoomba Region

=== United Kingdom ===
- Tipton Municipal Borough, a former local authority centred on Tipton, Birmingham, England
- Tipton St John, Devon

=== United States ===
- Tipton, California
- Tipton, Indiana
- Tipton, Iowa
- Tipton, Kansas
- Tipton, Michigan
- Tipton, Missouri
- Tipton, Oklahoma
- Tipton, Pennsylvania
- Tipton, Tennessee
- Tipton County, Indiana
- Tipton County, Tennessee
- Tipton Airport, Odenton Maryland
- Tipton Peak, Nevada

== Other uses ==
- Tipton (surname)
- The Tipton Hotel and London Tipton, a fictional place and character in the television series The Suite Life of Zack and Cody
- Tipton Harriers, athletics club in Tipton, England
