= 2023 Cornell Big Red football team =

American college football season

2023 Cornell Big Red football
- Conference: Ivy League
- Record: 3–7 (2–5 Ivy)
- Head coach: David Archer (10th season)
- Offensive coordinator: Joe Villapiano (6th season)
- Defensive coordinator: Jared Backus (10th season)
- Captains: Jake Stebbins; Micah Sahakian
- Home stadium: Schoellkopf Field

Uniform
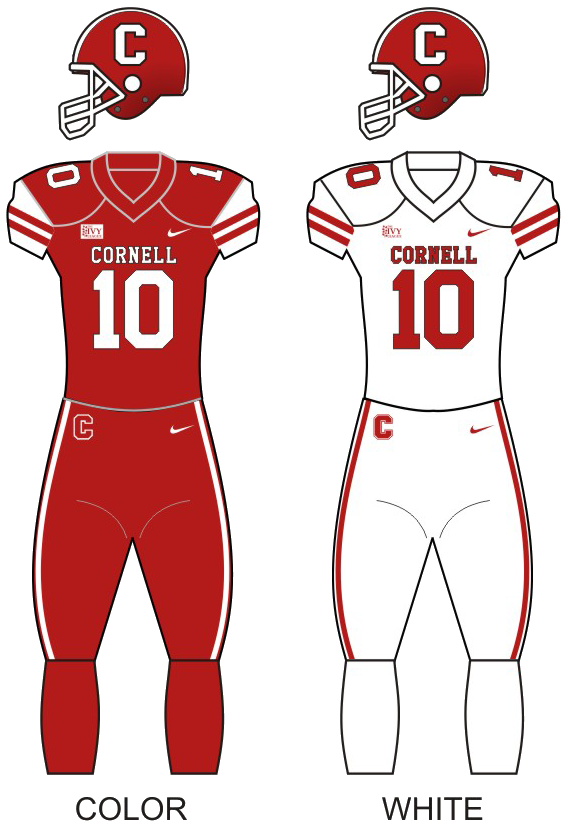

2023 Ivy League football standings
	Conf.			Overall
Team	W		L	W		L
Harvard +	5	–	2	8	–	2
Yale +	5	–	2	7	–	3
Dartmouth +	5	–	2	6	–	4
Princeton	4	–	3	5	–	5
Brown	3	–	4	5	–	5
Penn	3	–	4	6	–	4
Cornell	2	–	5	3	–	7
Columbia	1	–	6	3	–	7
+ – Conference co-champions; Rankings from STATS Poll

The 2023 Cornell Big Red football team represented Cornell University as a member of the Ivy League during the 2023 NCAA Division I FCS football season. The team was led by tenth-year head coach David Archer and played its home games at Schoellkopf Field in Ithaca, New York.

The Cornell Big Red failed to improve on a 5–5 overall, and 2–5 Ivy League, finish during the 2022 season, concluding the 2023 season 3–7 overall, and again 2–5 in Ivy League competition, to place seventh of eight in the conference. Though the Big Red began the season with wins on the road against Lehigh and preseason Ivy League favorite Yale, Cornell was 1–7 thereafter, its sole remaining win a 36–14 victory over Brown. After the conclusion of the season, Cornell athletic director Nicki Moore announced the removal of David Archer from the head coaching position and the appointment of defensive coordinator Jared Backus as his interim replacement.

Six Cornell players won a total of seven all-Ivy League selections, with Cornell leading the League in representation on the all-Ivy second team. Defensive back Paul Lewis won first-team defensive all-Ivy League honors. On offense, lineman and team co-captain Micah Sahakian, quarterback Jameson Wang, and receiver Nicholas Laboy won second-team honors. On defense, linebacker Holt Fletcher also won second-team honors. Jackson Kennedy won second-team honors on special teams, as both placekicker and punter.

== Schedule ==
The Cornell Big Red's 2023 football schedule consisted of five away and five home games. Cornell hosted Ivy League opponents Brown, Princeton, and Columbia, and traveled to Yale, Harvard, Penn, and Dartmouth. Cornell's non-conference opponents were Lehigh, rival Colgate, and Bucknell, all belonging to the Patriot League. Homecoming coincided with the Big Red's home opener against Colgate on September 30.

In 2022, Cornell finished 5–5 overall and 2–5 in conference play. In the 2023 Ivy League Football Preseason Media Poll, Cornell was predicted to finish seventh of eight in the Ivy League, ahead of Brown. In early September 2023, before the start of the season, senior linebacker Jake Stebbins and senior offensive lineman Micah Sahakian were elected the team captains for 2023.

Date	Time	Opponent	Site	TV	Result	Attendance
September 16	12:00 p.m.	at Lehigh*	Goodman Stadium; Bethlehem, PA	ESPN+	W 23–20	4,087
September 23	12:00 p.m.	at Yale	Yale Bowl; New Haven, CT	ESPN+	W 23–21	4,037
September 30	2:00 p.m.	Colgate*^{†}	Schoellkopf Field; Ithaca, NY (rivalry)	ESPN+	L 25–35	12,525
October 6	7:00 p.m.	at No. 21 Harvard	Harvard Stadium; Boston, MA	ESPN2	L 23–41	10,050
October 14	1:00 p.m.	Bucknell*	Schoellkopf Field; Ithaca, NY	ESPN+	L 13–21	2,142
October 21	1:00 p.m.	Brown	Schoellkopf Field; Ithaca, NY	ESPN+	W 36–14	3,612
October 28	1:00 p.m.	Princeton	Schoellkopf Field; Ithaca, NY	ESPN+	L 3–14	5,525
November 4	1:00 p.m.	at Penn	Franklin Field; Philadelphia, PA (rivalry)	ESPN+	L 8–23	9,408
November 11	1:30 p.m.	at Dartmouth	Memorial Field; Hanover, NH (rivalry)	ESPN+	L 14–30	2,530
November 18	1:00 p.m.	Columbia	Schoellkopf Field; Ithaca, NY (rivalry)	ESPN+	L 14–29	3,743
*Non-conference game; ^{†}Homecoming; Rankings from STATS Poll released prior to the game; All times are in Eastern time

== Game summaries ==
=== At Lehigh ===
Team	1	2	3	4	Total
• Cornell	14	3	0	6	23
Lehigh	0	7	0	13	20

- Date: September 16, 2023
- Location: Goodman Stadium, Bethlehem, Pennsylvania
- Game start: 12:02 p.m. EST
- Elapsed time: 3:19
- Game attendance: 4,087
- Game weather: Sunny
- Referee: T. Bowman

Seeking to improve on a 5–5 record in 2022, the Big Red traveled to Lehigh University in Bethlehem, Pennsylvania, for its season opener on Saturday, September 16. The Big Red defeated the Mountain Hawks 23–20, aided by two first quarter touchdown passes from quarterback Jameson Wang, first to Davon Kiser and then to Parker Woodring. Jackson Kennedy kicked a 32-yard field goal in the second quarter, giving Cornell a 17–0 lead until Lehigh scored its first points in the game, a Luke Yoder rushing touchdown also in the second quarter. After a scoreless third quarter, Cornell opened the fourth quarter with a 27-yard Kennedy field goal following an interception by linebacker Holt Fletcher, his second of the game. Lehigh scored a rushing touchdown, narrowing the deficit to 20–14. With approximately three minutes remaining in regulation, Cornell's Kennedy kicked a third field goal, good from 29 yards, to which Lehigh responded with another touchdown, though Cornell blocked the point-after attempt. Cornell recovered Lehigh's onside kick with less than two minutes to play in regulation, leading 23–20, and was able to expend the remainder of the clock to secure its first victory of the season. Though Cornell did not score a touchdown beyond the first quarter, the Big Red outgained the Mountain Hawks 401 yards to 239 yards.

Jameson Wang was successful in 19 of 31 passing attempts, for 293 yards and two touchdowns with no interceptions. Wang also led the Big Red in rushing, accumulating 85 yards in 17 carries. Davon Kiser was the Big Red receiving leader, accumulating 141 yards and one touchdown in four catches.

=== At Yale ===
Team	1	2	3	4	Total
• Cornell	0	3	14	6	23
Yale	14	0	0	7	21

- Date: September 23, 2023
- Location: Yale Bowl, New Haven, Connecticut
- Game start: 12:02 p.m. EST
- Elapsed time: 3:12
- Game attendance: 4,037
- Game weather: Sunny; 58°F; wind 15 mph NW
- Referee: B. McKeever

The Big Red traveled to defending Ivy League champion Yale University in New Haven, Connecticut to open its conference schedule for the season on Saturday, September 23, seeking to improve on a 2–5 conference record and a sixth-place finish in Ivy League play in 2022. Cornell defeated Yale, 23–21. The Yale Bulldogs scored two touchdowns in the first quarter, opening up a 14–0 lead, though did not score again until recording a touchdown in the fourth quarter. Meanwhile, the Big Red's Jackson Kennedy kicked a 22-yard field goal late in the second quarter, narrowing the deficit at halftime to 14–3.

Cornell scored two touchdowns in the third quarter, a Jameson Wang 1-yard quarterback rush and a 3-yard pass from Wang to wide receiver Nicholas Laboy, resulting in Cornell's first lead of the game, 17–14. With just under six minutes remaining in the fourth quarter, Cornell's Kennedy was again successful in a 22-yard field goal attempt, giving the Big Red a 20–14 lead. The Bulldogs briefly retook a 21–20 lead with a touchdown, a 30-yard pass on fourth down and just over three minutes remaining. Cornell responded, however, with a successful 30-yard Kennedy field goal following a 22-yard third down pass from Wang to wide receiver Doryn Smith and a 17-yard run by running back Gannon Carothers, securing the 23–21 upset victory against the pre-season Ivy League favorite as time expired. With the win, Cornell improved to 2–0 in the season, and 1–0 in Ivy League competition.

Jameson Wang was successful in 26 of 36 passing attempts, for 197 yards, one touchdown and no interceptions. Gannon Carothers led the Big Red in rushing, accumulating 95 yards in 9 carries. Doryn Smith was the Big Red receiving leader, accumulating 51 yards in four catches. In spite of the victory, senior linebacker and team co-captain Jake Stebbins suffered a knee injury during the contest with Yale, ending his season.

=== Colgate ===
Team	1	2	3	4	Total
• Colgate	7	7	0	21	35
Cornell	7	10	0	8	25

- Date: September 30, 2023
- Location: Schoellkopf Field, Ithaca, New York
- Game start: 2:02 p.m. EST
- Elapsed time: 3:23
- Game attendance: 12,525
- Game weather: Cloudy; 71°F; wind 6 mph S
- Referee: W. Boyd

The Big Red returned to Schoellkopf Field in Ithaca, New York for homecoming and for its season home opener against rival Colgate University on Saturday, September 30. The Colgate Raiders defeated the Cornell Big Red, 35–25. Cornell scored first, a 10-yard first quarter touchdown run by Jameson Wang, to which Colgate responded later in the first quarter with a 20-yard touchdown pass to tie the game. Cornell retook the lead in the second quarter with a 5-yard Wang run and Colgate again responded with a touchdown of its own. Cornell's Jackson Kennedy successfully kicked a 34-yard field goal shortly before the expiration of the second quarter, giving Cornell a 17–14 lead at halftime.

After a scoreless third quarter which included an interception by Cornell cornerback Anthony Chideme-Alfaro, Colgate scored two touchdowns in the fourth to open up a 28–17 lead, the second of which followed a Jameson Wang fumble recovered by Colgate on the Big Red's 23-yard line. With less than three minutes remaining in regulation, Wang threw an 11-yard touchdown pass to Cornell wide receiver Nicholas Laboy and followed with a two-yard rush for a successful two-point conversion, bringing the Big Red to within a field goal of tying the game, 28–25. On Colgate's ensuing possession, Cornell's defense forced the Raiders to punt, positioning Cornell on its own three-yard line with approximately two minutes remaining. The Raiders defense, however, sacked Wang on the second play from scrimmage and forced a fumble, which Colgate recovered in Cornell's endzone for a touchdown and a 35–25 lead. Receiving the ball again with less than two minutes remaining, Cornell was able to drive to Colgate's 49-yard line but was unable to convert on fourth down. Taking over on downs, Colgate expended the remainder of the clock on offense. With the defeat, the Big Red fell to 2–1 (1–0 Ivy League).

Jameson Wang was successful in 23 of 36 passing attempts, for 226 yards, one touchdown and no interceptions. Second-string quarterback Luke Duby also made an appearance in Cornell's final possession, completing four of seven passing attempts for 35 yards. Wang led the Big Red in rushing, accumulating 63 yards and two touchdowns in 12 carries. Nicholas Laboy was the Big Red receiving leader, accumulating 104 yards and one touchdown in seven catches.

=== At No. 21 Harvard ===
Team	1	2	3	4	Total
Cornell	0	10	7	6	23
• No. 21 Harvard	7	14	13	7	41

- Date: October 6, 2023
- Location: Harvard Stadium, Boston, Massachusetts
- Game start: 7:02 p.m. EST
- Elapsed time: 3:14
- Game attendance: 10,050
- Game weather: Clear; 67°F; wind 8 mph E
- Referee: Alexander Randolph
- Television network: ESPN2

The Big Red traveled to Harvard University in Boston, Massachusetts to resume its conference schedule on Friday, October 6. Cornell was defeated by the No. 21 Harvard Crimson under the lights of Harvard Stadium, 41–23, falling to 2–2 on the season (1–1 Ivy League). Harvard opened scoring with the only points of the first quarter, a one-yard touchdown run capping a 60-yard drive, and followed in the second quarter with a 42-yard touchdown run. The point-after attempt following the second touchdown was blocked, however, and the Crimson took a 13–0 lead. Later in the second, the Big Red responded with a touchdown of its own, its first points of the game on a Jameson Wang 1-yard touchdown run concluding a 75-yard, 15-play drive. Narrowing the deficit to 13–7, this is the closest Cornell came to tying or leading the game after scoring began. Harvard again scored in the second with a 36-yard touchdown pass followed by a successful two-point conversion to render the score 21–7. Near the end of the second quarter, Cornell's Jackson Kennedy kicked a 43-yard field goal to close first half scoring at 21–10.

Harvard again opened scoring in the second half, with a 17-yard third quarter touchdown pass to take a 28–10 lead. Later in the third, Cornell responded with another Wang touchdown run, this time for four yards. Shortly thereafter in the third, however, Harvard's quarterback broke away on a 58-yard touchdown run to open up a 34–17 lead for the Crimson. Harvard added to the lead in the fourth quarter, a 19-yard touchdown pass at the conclusion of a 4-play, 40-yard drive. Late in the fourth quarter, Cornell scored the final points of the game on a 12-yard pass from second-string quarterback Luke Duby, coming into the game in relief, to receiver Samuel Musungu, followed by an unsuccessful two-point conversion attempt.

Jameson Wang was successful in 21 of 34 passing attempts, for 165 yards, no touchdowns and no interceptions. In Cornell's final scoring drive, Luke Duby completed nine of eleven passing attempts in relief for 78 yards and one touchdown. Wang led the Big Red in rushing, accumulating 25 yards and two touchdowns in 14 carries. Nicholas Laboy was the Big Red receiving leader, accumulating 66 yards and one touchdown in five catches.

=== Bucknell ===
Team	1	2	3	4	Total
• Bucknell	0	7	7	7	21
Cornell	3	3	7	0	13

- Date: October 14, 2023
- Location: Schoellkopf Field, Ithaca, New York
- Game start: 1:02 p.m. EST
- Elapsed time: 3:02
- Game attendance: 2,142
- Game weather: Rain
- Referee: A. Florio

Following the defeat on the road against Harvard, the Cornell Big Red returned to Ithaca to conclude its season nonconference schedule against Bucknell University on Saturday, October 14. The Bucknell Bison defeated the Big Red, 21–13. Cornell scored first, a 46-yard field goal kicked by Jackson Kennedy shortly past the halfway point of the first quarter. The Bucknell Bison responded with an early second quarter 1-yard touchdown run to take a 7–3 lead. The Big Red narrowed the deficit to 7–6 with another field goal kicked by Kennedy, this time for 35 yards, as time expired in the first half. The Big Red opened scoring in the second half, a 5-yard Jameson Wang touchdown run just over two minutes into the third quarter to take a 13–7 lead. This touchdown represented the last points recorded by Cornell, as Bucknell scored on a 1-yard touchdown run late in the third quarter to retake a 14–13 lead. Bucknell added to the lead with the only points scored in the fourth quarter, a 6-yard touchdown pass with 9:15 remaining in the game to secure the 21–13 victory over Cornell.

Jameson Wang was successful in 15 of 26 passing attempts, for 200 yards, no touchdowns and one interception. Wang led the Big Red in rushing, accumulating 40 yards and one touchdown in 13 carries. Nicholas Laboy was the Big Red receiving leader, accumulating 89 yards in five catches.

=== Brown ===
Team	1	2	3	4	Total
Brown	0	0	14	0	14
• Cornell	7	13	13	3	36

- Date: October 21, 2023
- Location: Schoellkopf Field, Ithaca, New York
- Game start: 1:02 p.m. EST
- Elapsed time: 3:05
- Game attendance: 3,612
- Game weather: Cloudy; 54°F; wind 11 mph NW
- Referee: T. Bowman

The Big Red remained at home on Saturday, October 21, defeating Ivy League opponent Brown University, 36–14, to improve to 3–3 overall and 2–1 in the conference. Cornell was dominant in scoring during the first half, recording the only points scored by either team. The Big Red opened scoring with a 37-yard touchdown pass from Jameson Wang to Doryn Smith five-and-a-half minutes into the game to take a 7–0 lead. Cornell expanded the lead to 14–0 early in the second quarter with a 7-yard Ean Pope touchdown run and added six more points in the first half resulting from two Jackson Kennedy field goals. The first, successful from 35 yards, came shortly past the halfway point in the second quarter and the second, from 28 yards, was kicked as time expired in the first half, giving the Big Red a 20–0 lead at halftime.

The Big Red continued to build on the lead in the third quarter, opening second half scoring with another 37-yard touchdown pass, from Jameson Wang to Matt Robbert. The point-after attempt was blocked, however, and Cornell took a 26–0 lead. The Cornell defense followed on, cutting off the Brown Bears' ensuing offensive possession with a 55-yard Paul Lewis III interception return for a touchdown and a commanding 33–0 lead. With 5:48 remaining in the third quarter, the Bears recorded their first points of the game, a 61-yard touchdown pass, and followed on later in the third quarter with a 43-yard touchdown pass to narrow the deficit to 33–14. Brown did not score again, however, and Cornell recorded the only points of the fourth quarter, a 42-yard Kennedy field goal, to secure the 36–14 victory in the Ivy League matchup.

Jameson Wang was successful in 27 of 39 passing attempts, for 330 yards, two touchdowns and one interception. Ean Pope led the Big Red in rushing, accumulating 34 yards and one touchdown in 10 carries. Nicholas Laboy was the Big Red receiving leader, accumulating 87 yards in seven catches. Cornell recorded 434 yards of total offense in 39:47 of ball possession to Brown's 298 yards in 20:13. On defense, in addition to the Paul Lewis III "pick-six", Cornell's Brody Kidwell and Jeremiah Lewis each recorded one interception.

=== Princeton ===
Team	1	2	3	4	Total
• Princeton	7	7	0	0	14
Cornell	0	3	0	0	3

- Date: October 28, 2023
- Location: Schoellkopf Field, Ithaca, New York
- Game start: 1:02 p.m. EST
- Elapsed time: 3:02
- Game attendance: 5,525
- Game weather: Cloudy; 60°F; wind 11 mph NW
- Referee: J. Shay III

The Cornell Big Red concluded its three-game homestand with a matchup against Princeton University on Saturday, October 28. The Princeton Tigers defeated the Big Red, 14–3. Cornell recorded its only points of the low-scoring game during the second quarter, resulting from a 31-yard Jackson Kennedy field goal. Princeton scored two touchdowns in the first half of the game, the first a 77-yard touchdown pass in the first quarter to open scoring with a 7–0 lead and the second a 33-yard touchdown pass in the closing seconds of the first half to expand the lead to 14–3 following the Cornell field goal. Neither team recorded any points in the second half of the game, exchanging punts in the majority of possessions, though Kennedy's field goal attempt with just over ten minutes remaining in the fourth quarter was unsuccessful from 47 yards. The Big Red turned the ball over to the defense twice in the second half, the first a fumble in the third quarter and the second an interception thrown by Jameson Wang in the fourth, though Princeton's offense did not score any points in either of its resulting possessions. With the defeat, Cornell fell to 3–4 overall and 2–2 in the Ivy League.

Jameson Wang was successful in 26 of 42 passing attempts, for 234 yards, no touchdowns and one interception. Wang also led the Big Red in rushing, accumulating 45 yards in 10 carries. Nicholas Laboy was the Big Red receiving leader, accumulating 55 yards in seven catches. Despite the defeat, Cornell outgained the Tigers on offense, recording 350 yards of total offense in 35:24 of ball possession to Princeton's 323 yards in 24:36.

=== At Penn ===
Team	1	2	3	4	Total
Cornell	0	0	8	0	8
• Penn	10	6	7	0	23

- Date: November 4, 2023
- Location: Franklin Field, Philadelphia, Pennsylvania
- Game start: 1:03 p.m. EST
- Elapsed time: 2:52
- Game attendance: 9,408
- Game weather: Cloudy; 54°F
- Referee: J. Smith

To begin its final road trip of the season on Saturday, November 4, the Big Red traveled to the University of Pennsylvania, its historical rival, in Philadelphia to contend for the Trustees' Cup awarded annually to the winner of the football matchup between the two schools. The Penn Quakers defeated the Cornell Big Red, 23–8, aided by 261 yards of rushing, 164 of which came on two scoring plays. Penn received the ball on the opening kickoff and scored in its first possession, on a 28–yard field goal, to open with a 3–0 lead. The Quakers expanded the lead to 10–0 later in the first quarter, on a 1-yard touchdown run culminating a 79-yard, six-minute drive down the field. Before halftime, Penn further expanded its lead as a result of a 68-yard touchdown run by freshman running back Malachi Hosley; Cornell blocked the point-after attempt, however, and Penn's lead at halftime stood at 16–0.

Receiving the ball on the opening kickoff of the second half, Cornell cut the deficit by half in its first possession, scoring a touchdown on a 5-yard pass from Jameson Wang to Doryn Smith in culmination of a four-minute, 75-yard drive, following on with a Davon Kiser run for a successful two-point conversion and a score of 16–8. These were the only points Cornell scored in the game, however, as the Big Red were unable to capitalize on its ability to move the ball down the field. The Big Red defense forced Penn to punt away in its possession following the Cornell touchdown and Cornell was able to drive to Penn's 8-yard line thereafter, where Jackson Kennedy attempted a 25-yard field goal on fourth down. Penn blocked the field goal and recovered the ball, however, taking over on its own four-yard line. On the next play, Penn's Hosley ran 96 yards for a touchdown, producing a 23–8 lead for the Quakers, Penn's only points of the second half. Cornell again drove into Penn territory on its next possession, this time to the 1-yard line, where the Big Red turned the ball over on downs after attempting a quarterback run on fourth-and-goal. Again forcing Penn to punt, Cornell drove to Penn's 38-yard line in its next possession, where Jameson Wang threw an interception. Penn was not able to capitalize on the turnover, however, and Cornell again took over after a Penn punt. The Big Red were able to drive to Penn's 9-yard line before time in the fourth quarter expired, cementing the 23–8 victory for Penn. Cornell's record on the season fell to 3–5 overall and 2–3 in the Ivy League as a result of the defeat.

Jameson Wang was successful in 34 of 52 passing attempts, for 325 yards, one touchdown and one interception. Wang also led the Big Red in rushing, accumulating 54 yards in 13 carries. Doryn Smith was the Big Red receiving leader, accumulating 93 yards and one touchdown in ten catches. Similar to the defeat against Princeton, Cornell outgained its opponent on offense, recording 431 yards of total offense in 37:47 of ball possession to the Quakers' 365 yards in 22:13.

=== At Dartmouth ===
Team	1	2	3	4	Total
Cornell	0	7	7	0	14
• Dartmouth	14	7	3	6	30

- Date: November 11, 2023
- Location: Memorial Field, Hanover, New Hampshire
- Game start: 1:33 p.m. EST
- Elapsed time: 3:04
- Game attendance: 2,530
- Game weather: Sunny
- Referee: B. McKeever

For the penultimate game, and final away game, of the season, the Cornell Big Red traveled to Ivy League rival Dartmouth College in Hanover, New Hampshire, on Saturday, November 11. The Dartmouth Big Green defeated the Big Red, 30–14. Dartmouth opened scoring in the contest with two first quarter touchdowns to take a 14–0 lead, the first a 3-yard rush at the conclusion of its first offensive series of 75 yards and the second a 1-yard rush at the end of a 47-yard series near the end of the quarter. Cornell responded in the second quarter with a 5-play, 58-yard possession resulting in a 2-yard touchdown pass from running back Drew Powell to Ean Pope to close the Dartmouth lead to 14–7. With less than two minutes remaining in the first half, however, Dartmouth recorded another touchdown, a 37-yard pass play, to take a 21–7 lead at halftime.

In the third quarter, Jameson Wang rushed six yards for a touchdown and a score of 21–14 following a five-play, 23-yard series, Cornell having blocked a Dartmouth attempted punt to secure starting field position within Dartmouth territory. The Big Red did not score again in the game, however, and Dartmouth recorded a 42-yard field goal in its ensuing possession in the third quarter to take a 24–14 lead and concluded scoring in the matchup with a 5-yard run for a touchdown in the fourth quarter. The point-after attempt was unsuccessful, however, and Dartmouth assumed a 30–14 lead, which it held until the game's conclusion. The defeat rendered the Big Red 3–6 overall on the season and 2–4 in the Ivy League.

Jameson Wang was successful in 18 of 30 passing attempts, for 151 yards, no touchdowns and no interceptions. Drew Powell was successful in one of one passing attempt, for two yards and Cornell's second-quarter touchdown. Wang also led the Big Red in rushing, accumulating 31 yards and Cornell's third quarter touchdown in 8 carries. Davon Kiser was the Big Red receiving leader, accumulating 55 yards in four catches. Cornell recorded 266 yards of total offense in 27:25 of ball possession to the Big Green's 372 yards in 32:35.

=== Columbia ===
Team	1	2	3	4	Total
• Columbia	7	15	0	7	29
Cornell	0	0	7	7	14

- Date: November 18, 2023
- Location: Schoellkopf Field, Ithaca, New York
- Game start: 1:06 p.m. EST
- Elapsed time: 3:37
- Game attendance: 3,743
- Game weather: Cloudy; 29°F; wind 10 mph NW
- Referee: A. Florio

For its final game of the season, the Cornell Big Red returned to Ithaca to face Ivy League rival Columbia University in the Empire State Bowl on Saturday, November 18. The Columbia Lions defeated the Big Red, 29–14. With the defeat, Cornell concluded the season 3–7 overall and 2–5 in Ivy League competition to finish seventh of eight in the conference, failing to improve upon a 5–5 (2–5) sixth-place finish in the preceding season. Columbia scored first in the matchup, recording a touchdown with just over two minutes remaining in the first quarter, a 3-yard rush at the conclusion of a ten-play, 78-yard drive. Columbia continued to build on the lead, scoring four additional times in the second quarter to end the half ahead of the Big Red, 22–0. The Lions kicked two field goals in the second quarter, good from 33 and 28 yards respectively, followed by a 65-yard touchdown run by Columbia's quarterback. Though unsuccessful in a two-point conversion attempt, Columbia concluded first half scoring with a third field goal, good from 45 yards.

Receiving the second half kickoff, the Cornell Big Red scored on its first offensive possession thereafter, with a 2-yard Jameson Wang touchdown run capping a 10-play, 75-yard possession, to close the deficit to 22–7. The Cornell defense forced a Columbia punt, and the Big Red offense again recorded a touchdown in its ensuing possession, a 48-yard touchdown pass from Jameson Wang to Davon Kiser. The touchdown further narrowed the Columbia lead to 22–14, though Cornell did not score again in the contest. With just under three minutes remaining in regulation, Wang threw an interception to Columbia's Hayden McDonald, which McDonald subsequently returned 74 yards for a touchdown to seal the 29–14 victory for the Lions.

Jameson Wang was successful in 33 of 47 passing attempts, for 353 yards, one touchdown and three interceptions. Luke Duby was successful in one of one passing attempt, for five yards. Davon Kiser led the Big Red in rushing, with only one carry, for ten yards. Wang recorded 12 rushing attempts, for only nine yards. Kiser was also the Big Red receiving leader, accumulating 121 yards and one touchdown in six catches. As with the defeats against Princeton and Penn, Cornell outgained its opponent in recording 391 yards of total offense in 31:52 of ball possession to the Lions' 338 yards in 28:08.

== Roster ==
2023 Cornell Big Red football team roster
Players
Coaches
Offense

Pos.	#	Name	Class
WR	0	Davon Kiser	So
QB	1	Jameson Wang	Jr
RB	2	Gannon Carothers	So
WR	3	Zach LaPolice	Jr
QB	4	Luke Duby	Sr
RB	5	AJ Holmes	So
WR	6	Luke Malaga	Jr
WR	8	Nicholas Laboy	Sr
WR	9	Eddie Marinaro	Jr
QB	10	Dylan Hale	Sr
TE	11	Matt Robbert	Sr
QB	12	Chad Martini	Jr
WR	13	Parker Woodring	So
QB	14	Jimmy Taylor	Jr
QB	16	Garrett Bass-Sulpizio	Fr
TE	17	Manny Adebi	Sr
WR	18	Doryn Smith	So
WR	21	Matheson Bossick	Jr
RB	22	Johntu Reed	So
RB	23	Drew Powell	Sr
WR	28	Catcher Dobron	Fr
RB	35	Ean Pope	Fr
RB	41	Eddy Tillman	Jr
RB	46	Julian Dahl	So
TE	49	Nolan Albright	Fr
OL	50	Connor Garrahy	Sr
OL	57	Jackson Bradley	Jr
OL	59	Terrance Caldwell	Jr
OL	60	Mike Jones	So
OL	62	Tye Chirico	Jr
OL	64	Dylan Page	Fr
OL	65	Ty Short	So
OL	66	Evan Nesmith	So
OL	68	Zach Quilici	Fr
OL	70	Keegan Opper	So
OL	71	Timothy Bruen	Fr
OL	72	Davis Watson	Jr
OL	74	Matt Pante	Fr
OL	75	Micah Sahakian (C)	Sr
OL	76	Jack Powers	Jr
OL	78	Mac Dorward	Fr
OL	79	Joel Meglic	Sr
WR	80	Brendan Lee	Fr
WR	81	Logan Taylor	So
WR	83	Samuel Musungu	Fr
TE	84	Parker Spellacy	So
WR	85	Sebastian Dobron	So
TE	86	Ryder Kurtz	Fr
TE	87	A.J. Konstanty	Sr
TE	88	Matthew Polic	Sr
TE	89	Bo Graham	So

Defense

Pos.	#	Name	Class
CB	0	Paul Lewis III	Sr
S	1	Trey Harris	Jr
LB	2	Malin White	Sr
S	3	Christian Madison	Jr
LB	5	Rasean Thomas	Sr
CB	6	Rick Coleman Jr.	So
S	7	Brody Kidwell	Sr
S	8	DJ Hooker	So
LB	9	Damon Barnes	Jr
S	10	Jeremiah Lewis	So
S	11	Jackson Fortney	So
LB	12	Holt Fletcher	Sr
DB	13	Tommy MacPherson	Fr
LB	14	Joey Cheshire	So
DB	15	Rayjohn White	Fr
DB	16	Brayon Crawford	Fr
S	17	Nicholas Dlabach	So
DL	18	Muhammad-Ali Kobo	Jr
DB	19	Johnny Williamson	Fr
DB	20	Nomar Tejada	Fr
LB	21	Ben Sahakian	So
CB	22	Kyle Fitzgerald	Sr
CB	24	Anthony Chideme-Alfaro	Sr
LB	25	Luke Banbury	Jr
CB	26	Michael O'Keefe	Jr
DB	27	Braylon Howard	Fr
CB	28	Mamadou Bah	Jr
S	29	Nate Roy	Sr
LB	30	Jake Stebbins (injured) (C)	Sr
LB	31	Devia'n Parker-Rodgers	So
LB	32	James Reinbold	So
LB	33	Connor Henderson	Sr
LB	34	Noah Labbė	Sr
LB	35	Ogbonna Ugwu-Uche	Fr
LB	36	Daniel Amasha	So
S	38	Sean Polinsky	So
LB	39	Ian Wall	Fr
LB	40	Wilson Selzer	Jr
LB	45	Jack Ramsay	Fr
LB	47	Nic Paschall	Sr
LB	48	Hunter Sloan	Jr
DL	51	Jason Kirkland	Fr
LB	52	Noah Taylor	Sr
DL	55	Mason Yacovelli	So
DL	56	Malachi Edgerly	Fr
DL	58	Sean Cytrynbaum	Fr
DL	69	Kevin Ma	So
DL	77	Devin Malone	Jr
DL	90	Isaiah Gomes	Sr
DL	91	Brayden Walker	Fr
DL	92	Declan Ochendowski	So
DL	93	Brendan Chestnut	Sr
DL	94	Amon Williams	Jr
DL	95	Maxwell Van Fleet	Jr
DL	96	Onome Kessington	Sr
DL	97	Ezekiel Evans	Jr
DL	99	Connor Morgan	Sr

Special teams

Pos.	#	Name	Class
K, P	23	Alan Zhao	Fr
K, P	37	Ayden McCarter	Jr
LS	41	Gavin Heintschel	Jr
K, P	42	Nathaniel Hillenburg	Jr
K	43	Logan Bonn	Jr
K, P	53	Gray Fuller	Fr
K, P	53	Spencer Katz	Sr
K, P	98	Jackson Kennedy	Sr

Head coach

- David Archer

Coordinators/assistant coaches

- Jared Backus (defensive coordinator / linebackers)
- Joe Villapiano (offensive coordinator / quarterbacks)
- Satyen Bhakta (defensive line)
- Chad Nice (wide receivers / special teams coordinator)
- Will Blanden (defensive pass game / defensive backs)
- Sean Cascarano (offensive line)
- Andrew Dees (running backs)
- Kevin McDonough (tight ends / assistant special teams coordinator)
- Librado Barocio (assistant secondary coach)
- Luke Jenkins (offensive analyst)
- Chris Jaksch (defensive analyst)
- Jonah Hennessy (recruiting analyst)
- Zach Hart (senior director of player personnel)
- Alex Peffley (director of football operations)

Legend

- (C) Team captain
- (S) Suspended
- (I) Ineligible
- Injured
- Redshirt

Roster

== Season statistics ==
During the 2023 season, the Cornell Big Red outgained its opponents in both total and in average yards per game and also possessed the ball on offense for more time than its opponents did, both in total and on average per game, recording more cumulative first downs than its opponents. However, Cornell's opponents outscored the Big Red in both average points per game and in total across the season.

=== Team statistics vs. opponents ===
Statistics	Cornell	Opponents
Points per game	18.2	24.8
Total points	182	248
First downs	211	175
Rushing–total yards	1,062	1,650
Rushing–touchdowns	9	18
Passing–yards	2,594	1,762
Passing: Comp–Att–Int	258–395–8	141–260–8
Passing–touchdowns	10	14
Total yards per game	365.6	341.2
Total yards	3,656	3,412
Time of possession per game	34:34	25:26
Total time of possession	05:45:45	04:14:15

=== Individual statistics ===
Passing

Name	GP	Rating	Comp	Att	Int	%	Yds	TDs	Long	Avg–Game
Jameson Wang	10	123.83	243	375	8	64.80	2,472	9	68	247.20
Luke Duby	3	143.22	14	19	0	73.68	118	1	21	39.33
Chad Martini	4	133.60	1	1	0	100.00	4	0	4	1.00

Rushing (top three by net yards)

Name	GP	Att	Gain	Loss	Net	Avg	TDs	Long	Avg–Game
Jameson Wang	10	118	507	99	408	3.5	8	35	40.80
Gannon Carothers	7	41	195	9	186	4.5	0	29	26.57
Drew Powell	10	56	176	9	167	3.0	0	13	16.70

Receiving (top three by total yards)

Name	GP	Rec	Yds	Avg	TDs	Long	Avg–Game
Nicholas Laboy	10	58	705	12.16	2	38	70.50
Davon Kiser	8	31	458	14.77	2	68	57.25
Doryn Smith	10	38	398	10.47	2	37	39.80

Defense (top three tackling)

Name	GP	Solo	Asst	Tot Tackles	TFL–Yds	Sacks–Yds	Int
Noah Taylor	10	40	34	74	4.0–11	1.0–3	0
Brody Kidwell	10	21	21	42	3.0–6	0–0	2
Luke Banbury	10	18	23	41	1.5–6	1.0–6	0

Special teams (punting)

Name	Punts	Yds	Avg	Long
Jackson Kennedy	36	1,419	39.42	81
Nathaniel Hillenburg	2	66	33.00	34
Ayden McCarter	2	42	21.00	23

Special teams (placekicking)

Name	FG–Att	%	Long
Jackson Kennedy	14–19	73.68	46
