= David Archer (American football coach) =

American football player and coach (born 1982)

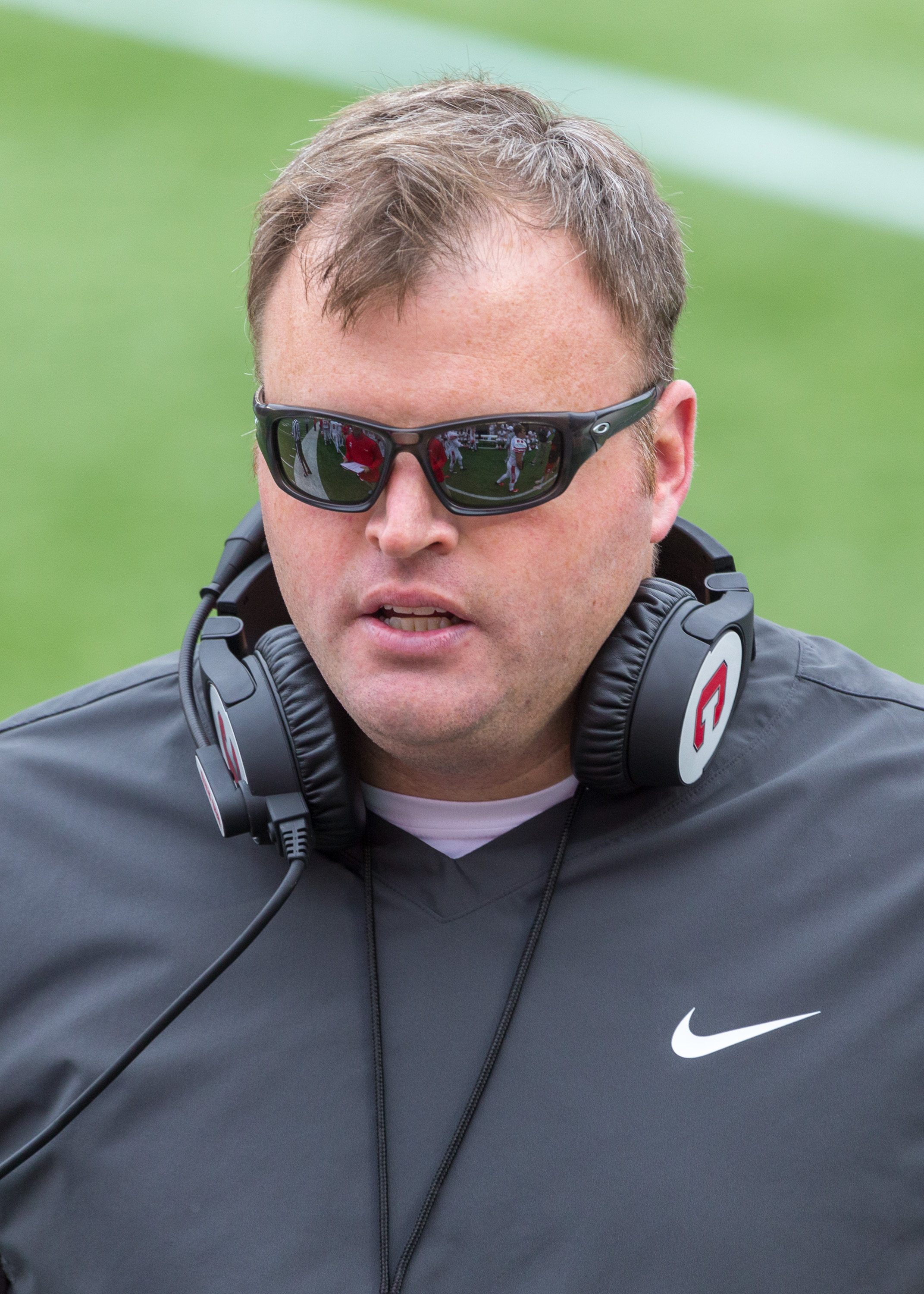
- Archer in 2019

Biographical details
- Born: November 5, 1982 (age 43)

Playing career
- 2001–2004: Cornell
- Position: Offensive lineman

Coaching career (HC unless noted)
- 2006: FDU–Florham (LB)
- 2007: Cornell (LB)
- 2008: Cornell (TE)
- 2009: Cornell (assistant OL)
- 2010–2011: Cornell (RB)
- 2012: Cornell (TE/FB)
- 2013–2023: Cornell

Head coaching record
- Overall: 29–71

David John Archer (born November 5, 1982) is an American college football coach and former player. He was the head football coach for Cornell University, a position he held from 2013 to 2023.

== Early life ==
Archer played high school football at Union-Endicott High School in Endicott, New York, where as a senior, he served as team captain and was named a first-team New York State all-star. Archer was a three-year starter for the Big Red football team at Cornell University, serving as team captain during his senior season, before graduating with a degree in economics in 2005.

== Coaching career ==
In 2006, while teaching fourth and eighth grades in Newark, New Jersey as part of Teach For America, Archer was an assistant coach at Fairleigh Dickinson–Florham, before returning to Cornell as an assistant.

In January 2013, Archer was appointed as Cornell's head coach. At just 30 years old, Archer was the youngest head college football coach in NCAA Division I at the time of his appointment. Archer took over a team that had not managed a winning season since 2005.

The Big Red managed just five wins in Archer's first three seasons. Results started to improve in 2016, highlighted by Cornell's first away win against a ranked opponent since 1950 when the team overcame a 23-point deficit to defeat No. 25 Colgate. However, the Big Red could not get over the hump, managing just one .500 season in Archer's ten seasons in charge and never managing more than three Ivy League wins in a season.

Following the 2023 season, Cornell athletics director Nicki Moore announced that Archer would not return to the head coaching role for the 2024 season. Archer was the longest-tenured head coach at Cornell since George K. James (1947–60).

== Head coaching record ==
Year	Team	Overall	Conference	Standing	Bowl/playoffs
Cornell Big Red (Ivy League) (2013–2023)
2013	Cornell	3–7	2–5	7th	
2014	Cornell	1–9	1–6	7th	
2015	Cornell	1–9	1–6	T–7th	
2016	Cornell	4–6	2–5	T–6th	
2017	Cornell	3–7	3–4	T–5th	
2018	Cornell	3–7	2–5	7th	
2019	Cornell	4–6	3–4	T–4th	
2020–21	No team—COVID-19				
2021	Cornell	2–8	1–6	T–6th	
2022	Cornell	5–5	2–5	T–6th	
2023	Cornell	3–7	2–5	7th	
Cornell:		29–71	19–51		
Total:		29–71			
