= 2023 Harvard Crimson football team =

American college football season

2023 Harvard Crimson football

Ivy League co-champion
- Conference: Ivy League
- Record: 8–2 (5–2 Ivy)
- Head coach: Tim Murphy (29th season)
- Offensive coordinator: Mickey Fein (3rd season)
- Offensive scheme: Pro spread
- Defensive coordinator: Scott Larkee (14th season)
- Base defense: 4–3
- Captain: Nate Leskovec
- Home stadium: Harvard Stadium

2023 Ivy League football standings
	Conf.			Overall
Team	W		L	W		L
Harvard +	5	–	2	8	–	2
Yale +	5	–	2	7	–	3
Dartmouth +	5	–	2	6	–	4
Princeton	4	–	3	5	–	5
Brown	3	–	4	5	–	5
Penn	3	–	4	6	–	4
Cornell	2	–	5	3	–	7
Columbia	1	–	6	3	–	7
+ – Conference co-champions; Rankings from STATS Poll

The 2023 Harvard Crimson football team represented Harvard University as a member of the Ivy League during the 2023 NCAA Division I FCS football season. The team was led by head coach Tim Murphy in his 29th and final season at Harvard, and played home games at Harvard Stadium in Boston. With a win against the Penn on November 11, the Crimson clinched at least a share of the Ivy League title. The Harvard Crimson football team drew an average home attendance of 11,555 in 2023.

== Schedule ==
Date	Time	Opponent	Rank	Site	TV	Result	Attendance
September 16	1:00 p.m.	St. Thomas (MN)*		Harvard Stadium; Boston, MA	ESPN+	W 45–13	6,217
September 22	7:00 p.m.	Brown		Harvard Stadium; Boston, MA	ESPN+	W 34–31	15,838
September 30	5:00 p.m.	at No. 6 Holy Cross*		Polar Park; Worcester, MA	ESPN+	W 38–28	7,906
October 6	7:00 p.m.	Cornell	No. 21	Harvard Stadium; Boston, MA	ESPN2	W 41–23	10,050
October 14	1:00 p.m.	Howard*	No. 19	Harvard Stadium; Boston, MA	ESPN+	W 48–7	7,678
October 21	1:00 p.m.	at Princeton	No. 18	Powers Field at Princeton Stadium; Princeton, NJ (rivalry)	ESPN+	L 14–21	8,345
October 28	4:00 p.m.	Dartmouth^{†}		Harvard Stadium; Boston, MA (rivalry)	NESN/ESPN+	W 17–9	22,515
November 4	12:30 p.m.	at Columbia		Robert K. Kraft Field at Lawrence A. Wien Stadium; New York, NY	ESPN+	W 38–24	3,723
November 11	1:00 p.m.	Penn	No. 24	Harvard Stadium; Boston, MA (rivalry)	ESPN+	W 25–23 ^{3OT}	7,032
November 18	12:00 p.m.	at Yale	No. 23	Yale Bowl; New Haven, CT (rivalry)	ESPNU	L 18–23	51,127
*Non-conference game; ^{†}Homecoming; Rankings from STATS Poll released prior to the game; All times are in Eastern time

== Rankings ==
Ranking movements Legend: ██ Increase in ranking ██ Decrease in ranking — = Not ranked RV = Received votes
	Week													
Poll	Pre	1	2	3	4	5	6	7	8	9	10	11	12	Final
STATS FCS	—	—	RV	RV	RV	21	19	18	RV	RV	24	23	RV	RV
Coaches	—	RV	RV	25	24	19	18	17	23	19	19	19	RV	

== Preseason ==
=== Ivy League media poll ===
The Ivy League's preseason prediction poll was released on August 7, 2023. The Crimson were predicted to finish fourth in the conference.

== Game summaries ==
=== St. Thomas (MN) ===
St. Thomas Tommies at Harvard Crimson – Game summary

Quarter	1	2	3	4	Total
Tommies	0	0	7	6	13
Crimson	21	10	14	0	45

at Harvard Stadium, Boston, Massachusetts

- Date: September 16
- Game time: 1:00 p.m. EDT
- Game weather: Cloudy, 66 °F (19 °C)
- Game attendance: 6,217
- Referee: John Shay
- TV: ESPN+
- Box score, Recap

Game information
First quarter
- HARV – Shane McLaughlin 79-yard run (Cali Canaval kick), 10:25. Crimson 7–0. Drive: 1 play, 79 yards, 0:12.
- HARV – Jaden Craig 4-yard run (Cali Canaval kick), 6:52. Crimson 14–0. Drive: 3 plays, 52 yards, 1:28.
- HARV – Isaiah Abbey 25-yard run (Cali Canaval kick), 4:48. Crimson 21–0. Drive: 3 plays, 32 yards, 0:44.

Second quarter

- HARV – Ty Bartum 96-yard interception return (Cali Canaval kick), 3:19. Crimson 28–0.
- HARV – Cali Canaval 43-yard field goal, 0:02. Crimson 31–0. Drive: 6 plays, 20 yards, 0:53.

Third quarter

- HARV – Charles DePrima 69-yard run (Cali Canaval kick), 14:37. Crimson 38–0. Drive: 2 plays, 69 yards, 0:17.
- STMN – Hope Adebayo 2-yard run (Stephen Shagen kick), 7:40. Crimson 38–7. Drive: 6 plays, 53 yards, 3:28.
- HARV – Tyler Neville 18-yard pass from Charles DePrima (Cali Canaval kick), 1:47. Crimson 45–7. Drive: 9 plays, 61 yards, 5:43.

Fourth quarter

- STMN – Shawn Shipman 3-yard run (kick failed), 10:18. Crimson 45–13. Drive: 13 plays, 78 yards, 6:22.

Statistics	STMN	HARV
First downs	21	14
Total yards	312	347
Rushing yards	96	255
Passing yards	216	92
Turnovers	4	1
Time of possession	40:11	19:49

Team	Category	Player	Statistics
St. Thomas	Passing	Amari Powell	15/25, 146 yards, 2 INT
St. Thomas	Rushing	Hope Adebayo	15 rushes, 62 yards, TD
St. Thomas	Receiving	Andrew McElroy	7 receptions, 121 yards
Harvard	Passing	Charles DePrima	7/18, 92 yards, TD, INT
Harvard	Rushing	Charles DePrima	10 rushes, 113 yards, TD
Harvard	Receiving	Tyler Neville	3 receptions, 37 yards, TD

=== Brown ===
Brown Bears at Harvard Crimson – Game summary

Quarter	1	2	3	4	Total
Bears	10	0	7	14	31
Crimson	0	14	13	7	34

at Harvard Stadium, Boston, Massachusetts

- Date: September 22
- Game time: 7:00 p.m. EDT
- Game weather: Clear, 61 °F (16 °C)
- Game attendance: 15,838
- Referee: Jeremy DeAngulo
- TV: ESPN+
- Box score, Recap

Game information
First quarter
- BRWN – Stockton Owen 1-yard run (Christopher Maron kick), 9:56. Bears 7–0. Drive: 8 plays, 34 yards, 4:12.
- BRWN – Christopher Maron 30-yard field goal, 0:12. Bears 10–0. Drive: 10 plays, 81 yards, 3:24.

Second quarter

- HARV – Shane McLaughlin 14-yard pass from Charles Deprima (Cali Canaval kick), 13:47. Bears 10–7. Drive: 5 plays, 75 yards, 1:25.
- HARV – Charles DePrima 3-yard run (Cali Canaval kick), 0:55. Crimson 14–10. Drive: 6 plays, 56 yards, 1:53.

Third quarter

- HARV – Shane McLaughlin 43-yard run (kick failed), 10:53. Crimson 20–10. Drive: 6 plays, 77 yards, 2:08.
- BRWN – Jordan McIntyre 9-yard pass from Jake Wilcox (Christopher Maron kick), 4:03. Crimson 20–17. Drive: 17 plays, 75 yards, 6:50.
- HARV – Cooper Barkate 15-yard pass from Charles DePrima (Cali Canaval kick), 2:06. Crimson 27–17. Drive: 6 plays, 44 yards, 1:47.

Fourth quarter

- BRWN – Stockton Owen 1-yard run (Christopher Maron kick), 13:07. Crimson 27–24. Drive: 10 plays, 75 yards, 3:59.
- HARV – Tyler Neville 31-yard pass from Charles DePrima (Cali Canaval kick), 11:23. Crimson 34–24. Drive: 4 plays, 75 yards, 1:44.
- BRWN – Stockton Owen 2-yard run (Christopher Maron kick), 6:41. Crimson 34–31. Drive: 11 plays, 80 yards, 4:34.

Statistics	BRWN	HARV
First downs	29	24
Total yards	447	464
Rushing yards	81	261
Passing yards	366	203
Turnovers	0	1
Time of possession	34:25	25:35

Team	Category	Player	Statistics
Brown	Passing	Justin Wilcox	36/52, 366 yards, TD
Brown	Rushing	Jordan DeLucia	7 rushes, 26 yards
Brown	Receiving	Wes Rockett	9 receptions, 149 yards
Harvard	Passing	Charles DePrima	15/26, 203 yards, 3 TD, INT
Harvard	Rushing	Shane McLaughlin	16 rushes, 152 yards, TD
Harvard	Receiving	Cooper Barkate	10 receptions, 132 yards, TD

=== At No. 6 Holy Cross ===
Harvard Crimson at No. 6 Holy Cross Crusaders – Game summary

Quarter	1	2	3	4	Total
Crimson	14	14	7	3	38
No. 6 Crusaders	7	14	0	7	28

at Polar Park, Worcester, Massachusetts

- Date: September 30
- Game time: 5:00 p.m. EDT
- Game weather: Cloudy, 62 °F (17 °C)
- Game attendance: 7,906
- Referee: Paul Matt Overton
- TV: ESPN+
- Box score, Recap

Game information
First quarter
- HARV – Cooper Barkate 8-yard run (Cali Canaval kick), 11:58. Crimson 7–0. Drive: 8 plays, 33 yards, 2:52.
- HC – Jalen Coker 74-yard pass from Matthew Sluka (Luis Palenzuela kick), 6:28. Tied 7–7. Drive: 1 play, 74 yards, 0:11.
- HARV – Dean Boyd 26-yard pass from Charles DePrima (Cali Canaval kick), 4:48. Crimson 14–7. Drive: 4 plays, 75 yards, 1:40.

Second quarter

- HARV – Shane McLaughlin 3-yard run (Cali Canaval kick), 10:53. Crimson 21–7. Drive: 9 plays, 45 yards, 3:58.
- HC – Jalen Coker 30-yard pass from Matthew Sluka (Luis Palenzuela kick), 6:49. Crimson 21–14. Drive: 7 plays, 71 yards, 3:58.
- HARV – A. J. Lopez 26-yard interception return (Cali Canaval kick), 1:46. Crimson 28–14.
- HC – Byron Shipman 4-yard pass from Matthew Sluka (Luis Palenzuela kick), 0:23. Crimson 28–21. Drive: 6 plays, 71 yards, 1:15.

Third quarter

- HARV – Cooper Barkate 31-yard pass from Charles DePrima (Cali Canaval kick), 3:05. Crimson 35–21. Drive: 9 plays, 70 yards, 4:10.

Fourth quarter

- HARV – Cali Canaval 40-yard field goal, 7:12. Crimson 38–21. Drive: 15 plays, 70 yards, 8:19.
- HC – Byron Shipman 3-yard pass from Matthew Sluka (Luis Palenzuela kick), 3:12. Crimson 38–28. Drive: 4 plays, 84 yards, 1:00.

Statistics	HARV	HC
First downs	20	19
Total yards	360	468
Rushing yards	209	148
Passing yards	151	320
Turnovers	0	5
Time of possession	33:46	26:14

Team	Category	Player	Statistics
Harvard	Passing	Charles DePrima	9/20, 151 yards, 2 TD
Harvard	Rushing	Charles DePrima	16 rushes, 89 yards
Harvard	Receiving	Cooper Barkate	5 receptions, 73 yards, TD
Holy Cross	Passing	Matthew Sluka	15/26, 320 yards, 4 TD, 3 INT
Holy Cross	Rushing	Matthew Sluka	20 rushes, 83 yards
Holy Cross	Receiving	Jalen Coker	7 receptions, 176 yards, 2 TD

=== Cornell ===
Cornell Big Red at No. 21 Harvard Crimson – Game summary

Quarter	1	2	3	4	Total
Big Red	0	10	7	6	23
No. 21 Crimson	7	14	13	7	41

at Harvard Stadium, Boston, Massachusetts

- Date: October 6
- Game time: 7:00 p.m. EDT
- Game weather: Clear, 67 °F (19 °C)
- Game attendance: 10,050
- Referee: Alexander Randolph
- TV: ESPN2
- Box score, Recap

Game information
First quarter
- HARV – Charles DePrima 1-yard run (Cali Canaval kick), 9:48. Crimson 7–0. Drive: 10 plays, 60 yards, 3:53.

Second quarter

- HARV – Charles DePrima 42-yard run (kick blocked), 14:51. Crimson 13–0. Drive: 5 plays, 64 yards, 1:51.
- COR – Jameson Wang 1-yard run (Jackson Kennedy kick), 7:12. Crimson 13–7. Drive: 15 plays, 75 yards, 7:39.
- HARV – Scott Woods II 36-yard pass from Charles DePrima (Charles DePrima pass to Tyler Neville), 4:11. Crimson 21–7. Drive: 7 plays, 75 yards, 3:01.
- COR – Jackson Kennedy 43-yard field goal, 0:00. Crimson 21–10. Drive: 12 plays, 58 yards, 4:06.

Third quarter

- HARV – Tyler Neville 17-yard pass from Charles DePrima (Cali Canaval kick), 10:15. Crimson 28–10. Drive: 4 plays, 83 yards, 0:41.
- COR – Jameson Wang 4-yard run (Jackson Kennedy kick), 4:09. Crimson 28–17. Drive: 11 plays, 75 yards, 6:06.
- HARV – Charles DePrima 58-yard run (kick blocked), 1:24. Crimson 34–17. Drive: 1 play, 58 yards, 0:10.

Fourth quarter

- HARV – Ledger Hatch 19-yard pass from Charles DePrima (Cali Canaval kick), 12:40. Crimson 41–17. Drive: 4 plays, 40 yards, 2:08.
- COR – Samuel Musungu 12-yard pass from Luke Duby (pass failed), 3:13. Crimson 41–23. Drive: 12 plays, 83 yards, 3:30.

Statistics	COR	HARV
First downs	27	20
Total yards	354	452
Rushing yards	111	243
Passing yards	243	209
Turnovers	0	0
Time of possession	35:19	24:41

Team	Category	Player	Statistics
Cornell	Passing	Jameson Wang	21/34, 165 yards
Cornell	Rushing	Jameson Wang	14 rushes, 25 yards, 2 TD
Cornell	Receiving	Nicholas Laboy	5 receptions, 66 yards
Harvard	Passing	Charles DePrima	12/19, 209 yards, 3 TD
Harvard	Rushing	Charles DePrima	9 rushes, 152 yards, 3 TD
Harvard	Receiving	Tim Dowd	2 receptions, 73 yards

=== Howard ===
Howard Bison at No. 19 Harvard Crimson – Game summary

Quarter	1	2	3	4	Total
Bison	0	0	0	7	7
No. 19 Crimson	7	21	10	10	48

at Harvard Stadium, Boston, Massachusetts

- Date: October 14
- Game time: 1:00 p.m. EDT
- Game weather: Sunny, 61 °F (16 °C)
- Game attendance: 7,678
- Referee: Antonio Marcella
- TV: ESPN+
- Box score, Recap

Game information
First quarter
- HARV – Isaiah Abbey 1-yard run (Cali Canaval kick), 8:26. Crimson 7–0. Drive: 12 plays, 77 yards, 5:21.

Second quarter

- HRAV – Xaviah Bascon 7-yard pass from Charles DePrima (Cali Canaval kick), 12:28. Crimson 14–0. Drive: 14 plays, 71 yards, 6:42.
- HARV – Scott Woods II 30-yard pass from Charles DePrima (Cali Canaval kick), 11:04. Crimson 21–0. Drive: 1 play, 30 yards, 0:07.
- HARV – Isaiah Abbey 8-yard run (Cali Canaval kick), 0:31. Crimson 28–0. Drive: 10 plays, 70 yards, 3:16.

Third quarter

- HARV – Isaiah Abbey 52-yard run (Cali Canaval kick), 11:17. Crimson 35–0. Drive: 1 play, 52 yards, 0:11.
- HARV – Cali Canaval 32-yard field goal, 2:35. Crimson 38–0. Drive: 10 plays, 72 yards, 4:28.

Fourth quarter

- HARV – Cali Canaval 39-yard field goal, 14:48. Crimson 41–0. Drive: 4 plays, 5 yards, 0:41.
- HARV – Conor Easthope 19-yard run (Cali Canaval kick), 8:55. Crimson 48–0. Drive: 5 plays, 80 yards, 3:03.
- HOW – Tony Bedell 8-yard run (Dylan West kick), 3:36. Crimson 48–7. Drive: 12 plays, 75 yards, 5:19.

Statistics	HOW	HARV
First downs	15	24
Total yards	274	469
Rushing yards	139	341
Passing yards	135	128
Turnovers	3	0
Time of possession	29:03	30:57

Team	Category	Player	Statistics
Howard	Passing	Quinton Williams	11/22, 111 yards, 2 INT
Howard	Rushing	Eden James	13 rushes, 47 yards
Howard	Receiving	Richie Ilarraza	4 receptions, 43 yards
Harvard	Passing	Charles DePrima	11/17, 128 yards, 2 TD
Harvard	Rushing	Isaiah Abbey	16 rushes, 120 yards, 3 TD
Harvard	Receiving	Scott Woods II	3 receptions, 60 yards, TD

=== At Princeton ===
No. 18 Harvard Crimson at Princeton Tigers – Game summary

Quarter	1	2	3	4	Total
No. 18 Crimson	0	0	7	7	14
Tigers	7	7	0	7	21

at Powers Field at Princeton Stadium, Princeton, New Jersey

- Date: October 21
- Game time: 1:00 p.m. EDT
- Game weather: Cloudy, 60 °F (16 °C)
- Game attendance: 8,345
- Referee: Todd Boyd
- TV: ESPN+
- Box score, Recap

Game information
First quarter
- PRIN – Ja'Derris Carr 34-yard run (Sam Massick kick), 3:52. Tigers 7–0. Drive: 2 plays, 42 yards, 0:49.

Second quarter

- PRIN – A. J. Barber 8-yard pass from Blake Stenstrom (Sam Massick kick), 0:36. Tigers 14–0. Drive: 7 plays, 50 yards, 1:22.

Third quarter

- HARV – Kaedyn Odermann 12-yard pass from Charles DePrima (Cali Canaval kick), 0:10. Tigers 14–7. Drive: 10 plays, 63 yards, 4:57.

Fourth quarter

- HARV – Shane McLaughlin 1-yard run (Cali Canaval kick), 9:40. Tied 14–14. Drive: 10 plays, 38 yards, 4:53.
- PRIN – Connor Hulstein 10-yard pass from Blake Stenstrom (Sam Massick kick), 1:28. Tigers 21–14. Drive: 8 plays, 45 yards, 2:34.

Statistics	HARV	PRIN
First downs	14	15
Total yards	220	327
Rushing yards	68	83
Passing yards	152	244
Turnovers	3	1
Time of possession	31:52	28:08

Team	Category	Player	Statistics
Harvard	Passing	Charles DePrima	15/36, 152 yards, TD, 3 INT
Harvard	Rushing	Shane McLaughlin	17 rushes, 65 yards, TD
Harvard	Receiving	Kaedyn Odermann	4 receptions, 57 yards, TD
Princeton	Passing	Blake Stenstrom	21/36, 244 yards, 2 TD
Princeton	Rushing	Ja'Derris Carr	14 rushes, 56 yards, TD
Princeton	Receiving	Luke Colella	5 receptions, 98 yards

=== Dartmouth ===
Dartmouth Big Green at Harvard Crimson – Game summary

Quarter	1	2	3	4	Total
Big Green	3	0	3	3	9
Crimson	7	0	7	3	17

at Harvard Stadium, Boston, Massachusetts

- Date: October 28
- Game time: 4:00 p.m. EDT
- Game weather: Sunny, 78 °F (26 °C)
- Game attendance: 22,515
- Referee: Jeff Pumphrey
- TV: NESN/ESPN+
- Box score, Recap

Game information
First quarter
- HARV – Jaden Craig 4-yard run (Cali Canaval kick), 7:47. Crimson 7–0. Drive: 3 plays, 14 yards, 1:05.
- DART – Owen Zalc 37-yard field goal, 0:10. Crimson 7–3. Drive: 7 plays, 19 yards, 2:35.

Second quarter

- No scoring plays

Third quarter

- DART – Owen Zalc 47-yard field goal, 5:49. Crimson 7–6. Drive: 10 plays, 35 yards, 4:16.
- HARV – Jaden Craig 3-yard run (Cali Canaval kick), 0:20. Crimson 14–6. Drive: 11 plays, 75 yards, 5:29.

Fourth quarter

- HARV – Cali Canaval 22-yard field goal, 3:26. Crimson 17–6. Drive: 13 plays, 60 yards, 6:10.
- DART – Owen Zalc 35-yard field goal, 0:15. Crimson 17–9. Drive: 16 plays, 58 yards, 3:11.

Statistics	DART	HARV
First downs	21	18
Total yards	325	264
Rushing yards	83	228
Passing yards	242	36
Turnovers	2	2
Time of possession	28:27	31:33

Team	Category	Player	Statistics
Dartmouth	Passing	Dylan Cadwallader	24/37, 186 yards, INT
Dartmouth	Rushing	Q. Jones	11 rushes, 50 yards
Dartmouth	Receiving	Paxton Scott	7 receptions, 72 yards
Harvard	Passing	Charles DePrima	4/9, 23 yards, 2 INT
Harvard	Rushing	Shane McLaughlin	24 rushes, 156 yards
Harvard	Receiving	Cooper Barkate	2 receptions, 9 yards

Starting quarterback Charles DePrima was benched in the second quarter after throwing his second interception of the game. Jade Craig would step in at quarterback for the rest of the game. With the win, head coach Tim Murphy broke the record for most Ivy League wins by a coach, with 136.

=== At Columbia ===
Harvard Crimson at Columbia Lions – Game summary

Quarter	1	2	3	4	Total
Crimson	17	7	0	14	38
Lions	0	7	3	14	24

at Robert K. Kraft Field at Lawrence A. Wien Stadium, New York City, New York

- Date: November 4
- Game time: 12:30 p.m. EDT
- Game weather: Sunny, 54 °F (12 °C)
- Game attendance: 3,723
- Referee: Paul Matt Overton
- TV: ESPN+
- Box score, Recap

Game information
First quarter
- HARV – Tim Dowd 83-yard pass from Jaden Craig (Cali Canaval kick), 11:21. Crimson 7–0. Drive: 2 plays, 83 yards, 0:47.
- HARV – Kaleb Moody 10-yard punt return (Cali Canaval kick), 9:47. Crimson 14–0.
- HARV – Cali Canaval 27-yard field goal, 1:12. Crimson 17–0. Drive: 12 plays, 68 yards, 6:37.

Second quarter

- COLU – Joey Giorgi 23-yard run (Hugo Merry kick), 11:11. Crimson 17–7. Drive: 10 plays, 75 yards, 5:01.
- HARV – Shane McLaughlin 3-yard run (Cali Canaval kick), 8:35. Crimson 24–7. Drive: 5 plays, 71 yards, 2:29.

Third quarter

- COLU – Hugo Merry 42-yard field goal, 5:22. Crimson 24–10. Drive: 19 plays, 51 yards, 9:38.

Fourth quarter

- HARV – Shane McLaughlin 6-yard run (Cali Canaval kick), 13:30. Crimson 31–10. Drive: 4 plays, 62 yards, 2:16.
- HARV – Jaden Craig 1-yard run (Cali Canaval kick), 8:21. Crimson 38–10. Drive: 6 plays, 18 yards, 3:03.
- COLU – Joey Giorgi 11-yard pass from Joe Green (Hugo Merry kick), 6:22. Crimson 38–17. Drive: 5 plays, 73 yards, 1:52.
- COLU – J. J. Jenkins 11-yard pass from Joe Green (Hugo Merry kick), 0:20. Crimson 38–24. Drive: 13 plays, 74 yards, 3:24.

Statistics	HARV	COLU
First downs	16	22
Total yards	401	330
Rushing yards	137	115
Passing yards	264	215
Turnovers	1	2
Time of possession	28:48	31:12

Team	Category	Player	Statistics
Harvard	Passing	Jaden Craig	13/18, 264 yards, TD
Harvard	Rushing	Shane McLaughlin	18 rushes, 89 yards, 2 TD
Harvard	Receiving	Tim Dowd	3 receptions, 123 yards, TD
Columbia	Passing	Joe Green	24/40, 215 yards, 2 TD, 2 INT
Columbia	Rushing	Joey Giorgi	19 rushes, 92 yards, TD
Columbia	Receiving	Edan Stagg	7 receptions, 82 yards

=== Penn ===
Penn Quakers at No. 24 Harvard Crimson – Game summary

Quarter	1	2	3	4	OT	2OT	3OT	Total
Quakers	7	3	3	7	3	0	0	23
No. 24 Crimson	7	13	0	0	3	0	2	25

at Harvard Stadium, Boston, Massachusetts

- Date: November 11
- Game time: 1:00 p.m. EDT
- Game weather: Sunny, 48 °F (9 °C)
- Game attendance: 7,032
- Referee: Henry Wimberg
- TV: ESPN+
- Box score, Recap

Game information
First quarter
- PENN – Malachi Hosley 29-yard run (Graham Gotlieb kick), 13:12. Quakers 7–0. Drive: 4 plays, 75 yards, 1:48.
- HARV – Jaden Craig 3-yard run (Cali Canaval kick), 10:45. Tied 7–7. Drive: 6 plays, 68 yards, 2:26.

Second quarter

- PENN – Graham Gotlieb 43-yard field goal, 11:13. Quakers 10–7. Drive: 11 plays, 50 yards, 4:46.
- HARV – Cooper Barkate 8-yard pass from Jaden Craig (kick failed), 5:22. Crimson 13–10. Drive: 13 plays, 80 yards, 5:43.
- HARV – Jaden Craig 2-yard run (Cali Canaval kick), 1:06. Crimson 20–10. Drive: 9 plays, 70 yards, 3:52.

Third quarter

- PENN – Graham Gotlieb 23-yard field goal, 4:16. Crimson 20–13. Drive: 7 plays, 23 yards, 2:44.

Fourth quarter

- PENN – Malachi Hosley 1-yard run (Graham Gotlieb kick), 11:12. Tied 20–20. Drive: 10 plays, 69 yards, 4:48.

Overtime

- PENN – Albert Jang 36-yard field goal. Quakers 23–20. Drive: 4 plays, 6 yards.
- HARV – Cali Canaval 19-yard field goal. Tied 23–23. Drive: 8 plays, 24 yards.

Second overtime

- No scoring plays

Third overtime

- HARV – Cooper Barkate 2-point conversion pass to Jaden Craig. Crimson 25–23.

Statistics	PENN	HARV
First downs	18	24
Total yards	341	384
Rushing yards	109	131
Passing yards	232	253
Turnovers	1	1
Time of possession	23:56	36:04

Team	Category	Player	Statistics
Penn	Passing	Aidan Sayin	21/36, 215 yards, INT
Penn	Rushing	Malachi Hosley	22 rushes, 109 yards, 2 TD
Penn	Receiving	Bryce Myers	8 receptions, 66 yards
Harvard	Passing	Jaden Craig	23/36, 253 yards, TD, INT
Harvard	Rushing	Shane McLaughlin	27 rushes, 88 yards
Harvard	Receiving	Cooper Barkate	8 receptions, 125 yards, TD

=== At Yale ===
No. 23 Harvard Crimson at Yale Bulldogs – Game summary

Quarter	1	2	3	4	Total
No. 23 Crimson	0	6	0	12	18
Bulldogs	3	7	7	6	23

at Yale Bowl, New Haven, Connecticut

- Date: November 18
- Game time: 12:00 p.m. EST
- Game weather: Cloudy, 50 °F (10 °C)
- Game attendance: 51,127
- Referee: Tim Barker
- TV: ESPNU
- Box score, Recap

Game information
First quarter
- YALE – Jack Bosman 33-yard field goal, 1:05. Bulldogs 3–0. Drive: 16 plays, 48 yards, 7:05.

Second quarter

- YALE – Ryan Lindley 5-yard pass from Nolan Grooms (Jack Bosman kick), 9:12. Bulldogs 10–0. Drive: 3 plays, 7 yards, 1:16.
- HARV – Tyler Neville 11-yard pass from Jaden Craig (kick blocked), 1:08. Bulldogs 10–6. Drive: 6 plays, 59 yards, 2:08.

Third quarter

- YALE – Nathan Denney 4-yard run (Jack Bosman kick), 4:42. Bulldogs 17–6. Drive: 9 plays, 47 yards, 3:33.

Fourth quarter

- HARV – Jaden Craig 7-yard run (pass failed), 14:57. Bulldogs 17–12. Drive: 5 plays, 58 yards, 1:10.
- HARV – Ledger Hatch 7-yard pass from Jaden Craig (run failed), 10:45. Crimson 18–17. Drive: 6 plays, 58 yards, 2:02.
- YALE – David Pantelis 12-yard pass from Nolan Grooms (run failed), 5:47. Bulldogs 23–18. Drive: 3 plays, 14 yards, 1:18.

Statistics	HARV	YALE
First downs	16	20
Total yards	318	260
Rushing yards	73	170
Passing yards	245	90
Turnovers	2	2
Time of possession	24:33	35:27

Team	Category	Player	Statistics
Harvard	Passing	Jaden Craig	20/33, 245 yards, 2 TD, INT
Harvard	Rushing	Shane McLaughlin	13 rushes, 50 yards
Harvard	Receiving	Tim Dowd	2 receptions, 71 yards
Yale	Passing	Nolan Grooms	10/23, 90 yards, 2 TD, INT
Yale	Rushing	Joshua Pitsenberger	23 rushes, 99 yards
Yale	Receiving	Ryan Lindley	4 receptions, 39 yards, TD

== Roster ==
2023 Harvard Crimson football team roster
Players
Coaches
Offense

Pos.	#	Name	Class
WR	2	Cooper Barkate	So
QB	3	Dante Torres	Fr
QB	4	Connor Easthope	Jr
WR	6	Scott Woods II	Jr
WR	7	Kaedyn Odermann	Sr
WR	9	Cole Cleary	Jr
QB	10	Jaden Craig	So
WR	13	Ledger Hatch	Jr
WR	14	Jean-Bernard Zoungrana	Sr
WR	15	Cayden Coffman	So
QB	16	Charles DePrima	Jr
WR	19	Dylan Almeyda	Fr
RB	20	Jordan Harris	So
RB	22	Xaviah Bascon	Fr
RB	24	Malik Frederic	Jr
RB	25	Kyle Johnson	Fr
RB	27	Isaiah Abbey	So
RB	29	Shane McLaughlin	Jr
RB	31	Mekhi Moore	So
TE	42	Logan Reaska	Fr
TE	48	Tim Dowd	Sr
OL	53	Jack Gentle	Jr
OL	54	Peter O'Mara	Fr
OL	55	Derek Osman	So
OL	59	Logan Bednar	Sr
OL	60	Jon Mould	Fr
OL	61	Aidan Kilstorm	So
OL	62	Derek Thompson	Fr
OL	63	Ean Norenberg	Sr
OL	64	Jacob Rizy	Sr
OL	65	Jarom Larman	Sr
OL	66	Dominik Di Filippo	Fr
OL	67	Davis McKenna	Jr
OL	68	Austin Gentle	Jr
OL	69	Garrett Seymour	Sr
OL	71	Thomas O'Brien	Fr
OL	73	Spencer Cassell	Sr
OL	74	Ryan Adams	So
OL	75	Jackson Newville	So
OL	76	Max Bowman	So
OL	77	Spencer Doan	Fr
OL	78	Carter Daly	So
OL	79	Mike Entwistle	Jr
TE	81	Seamus Gilmartin	Fr
TE	82	Scott Giuliano	Jr
WR	84	Dean Boyd	So
TE	86	Ryan Osborne	So
WR	87	Justin Leszynski	Jr
TE	88	Tyler Neville	Sr
WR	89	Ryan Mooney	Fr

Defense

Pos.	#	Name	Class
DB	0	Gavin Shipman	Jr
S	1	Delian Bradley	So
DB	2	Ameer Dudley	Jr
LB	3	Eric Little	Jr
DB	4	John Chung	Fr
DB	5	Luke Bridges	Jr
DB	7	Damien Henderson	Fr
DB	8	Riley Jenne	Jr
DB	9	Langston Rogers	Fr
DB	11	Sterling Scott	Jr
DB	12	Austin-Jake Guillory	Fr
S	18	Kaleb Moody	Sr
LB	20	Marcus Alexander	Jr
S	21	Ty Bartrum	So
DB	22	Myles Wiley	Jr
S	23	Isaiah Kacyvenski Jr.	Fr
DB	24	Phillip Smitherman	Sr
DB	26	Isaac Rollins	So
DB	27	A. J. Lopez	So
LB	30	Owen Johnson	Fr
LB	31	Will Troutman	Jr
DB	32	Ben Abercrombie	Sr
LB	34	Matt Cavanagh	Sr
LB	35	Sean Line	Fr
S	36	Garrett Sharp	Sr
S	37	Conor Walsh	Fr
LB	38	Jaeden Kinlock	So
LB	39	Mitchell Gonser	Jr
LB	40	Caleb Phillips	So
LB	41	Ben Harding	Sr
LB	42	Oreck Frazier	Jr
DL	43	Carson Winkie	Sr
LB	44	Aaron McDonald	Fr
LB	45	Jack Donahoe	Fr
LB	46	Jack Kirkwood	So
DE	47	Josh Fedd	Fr
LB	49	Matt Hudson	Sr
DL	50	Thor Griffith	Sr
DL	51	Nate Leskovec	Sr
LB	52	Brock Lockinar	Sr
LB	56	Jordan Dotson	So
DT	57	Micaiah Bell	Sr
DE	58	Jakob Frates	So
DL	59	Jacinto Lopez	Fr
DL	70	Conway Zhang	Fr
DL	72	Kwaku Adubofour	Sr
DL	75	Alex DeGrieck	So
DL	83	Pearson Dennis	Jr
DE	87	Jack Crowley	Fr
DL	90	Nick Yagodich	Jr
DL	91	Stephen Scourtis	Fr
DT	92	Tyler Huenemann	Sr
DL	93	Chris Ramundo	Sr
DE	94	Jacob Psyk	Jr
DL	96	Dominic Young-Smith	Jr
DL	97	Brandon Svets	Jr
DE	98	Jake Darling	Fr
DT	99	Xavier Agostino	So

Special teams

Pos.	#	Name	Class
K	47	Cali Canaval	Sr
P, K	91	Sebastian Tasko	Jr
P, K	92	Win Byerley	Fr

Head coach

- Tim Murphy

Coordinators/assistant coaches

- Mickey Fein
  Offensive coordinator/Wide receivers
- Scott Larkee
  Defensive coordinator/Linebackers
- Joel Lamb
  Quarterbacks
- Ryan Crawford
  Special teams coordinator/Secondary
- Michael Horan
  Defensive line
- Logan Johnson
  Defensive ends
- Keegan Kennedy
  Offensive line
- Lazaro Mitjans Jr.
  Running backs
- Drew Jacobs
  Safeties

Legend

- (C) Team captain
- (S) Suspended
- (I) Ineligible
- Injured
- Redshirt

Roster
Last update: January 12, 2024
