= 2023 Yale Bulldogs football team =

American college football season

2023 Yale Bulldogs football

Ivy League co-champion
- Conference: Ivy League
- Record: 7–3 (5–2 Ivy)
- Head coach: Tony Reno (11th season)
- Offensive coordinator: Chris Ostrowsky (1st season)
- Offensive scheme: Pro spread
- Defensive coordinator: Sean McGowan (6th season)
- Co-defensive coordinator: Jay Anderson (1st season)
- Base defense: 4–2–5
- Home stadium: Yale Bowl

2023 Ivy League football standings
	Conf.			Overall
Team	W		L	W		L
Harvard +	5	–	2	8	–	2
Yale +	5	–	2	7	–	3
Dartmouth +	5	–	2	6	–	4
Princeton	4	–	3	5	–	5
Brown	3	–	4	5	–	5
Penn	3	–	4	6	–	4
Cornell	2	–	5	3	–	7
Columbia	1	–	6	3	–	7
+ – Conference co-champions; Rankings from STATS Poll

The 2023 Yale Bulldogs football team represented Yale University as a member of the Ivy League during the 2023 NCAA Division I FCS football season. The team was led by 11th-year head coach Tony Reno and played home games at the Yale Bowl in New Haven, Connecticut. The Yale Bulldogs football team drew an average home attendance of 11,581 in 2023.

A total of nine Yale players won all-Ivy League selections, with Yale leading the League in representation on the all-Ivy first team. On offense, linemen Kiran Amegadjie and Jonathan Mendoza, quarterback Nathan Grooms, and receiver Mason Tipton (who was a unanimous selection) won first-team honors. Defensive lineman Clay Patterson, linebacker Joseph Vaughn, and defensive back Wande Owens earned defensive first-team selections. Running back Joshua Pitsenberger and tight end Jackson Hawes won second-team offensive honors. Offensive lineman Michael Bennett, defensive lineman Alvin Gulley, linebacker Hamilton Moore, and defensive back Sean Guyton received honorable mentions.

== Schedule ==
Date	Time	Opponent	Site	TV	Result	Attendance
September 16	12:00 p.m.	No. 6 Holy Cross*	Yale Bowl; New Haven, CT	ESPN+	L 24–49	4,968
September 23	12:00 p.m.	Cornell	Yale Bowl; New Haven, CT	ESPN+	L 21–23	4,037
September 30	12:00 p.m.	Morgan State*	Yale Bowl; New Haven, CT	ESPN+	W 45–3	7,960
October 7	1:30 p.m.	at Dartmouth	Memorial Field; Hanover, NH	ESPN+	W 31–24	2,880
October 14	12:00 p.m.	Sacred Heart*	Yale Bowl; New Haven, CT	ESPN+	W 31–3	3,739
October 21	12:00 p.m.	Penn	Yale Bowl; New Haven, CT	ESPN+	L 17–27	3,817
October 28	12:00 p.m.	Columbia	Yale Bowl; New Haven, CT	ESPN+	W 35–7	5,422
November 4	12:30 p.m.	at Brown	Brown Stadium; Providence, RI	ESPN+	W 36–17	4,805
November 11	12:00 p.m.	at Princeton	Powers Field at Princeton Stadium; Princeton, NJ (rivalry)	ESPNU	W 36–28 ^{2OT}	7,157
November 18	12:00 p.m.	No. 23 Harvard	Yale Bowl; New Haven, CT (rivalry)	ESPNU	W 23–18	51,127
*Non-conference game; Rankings from STATS Poll released prior to the game; All times are in Eastern time

== Roster ==
2023 Yale Bulldogs football team roster
Players
Coaches
Offense

Pos.	#	Name	Class
RB	24	Spencer Alston	Sr
OL	72	Kiran Amegadjie	Sr
OL	66	Bennie Anderson	Sr
OL	59	Zavier Avera	Fr
TE	88	Ryan Belk	Jr
OL	75	Michael Bennett	So
OL	58	Leo Bluhm	So
WR	8	Nico Brown	So
OL	70	Cameron Charron	So
RB	28	Wilhelm Daal	So
RB	21	Nathan Denney	Jr
WR	14	Garon Duncan	Fr
OL	63	Jonathon Durand	Sr
RB	4	Josh Eboboko	Sr
OL	73	Teo Falk	Sr
WR	23	Joey Felton	Sr
QB	13	Ben Finkel	Jr
TE	80	Luke Foster	Jr
OL	55	Dylan Garrity	Fr
QB	12	Nolan Grooms	Sr
OL	74	Connor Halverson	Jr
TE	87	Jackson Hawes	Sr
RB	38	Du'Shaunte Holloway	Sr
QB	3	Marshall Howe	So
QB	9	Grant Jordan	Jr
WR	83	Brice June	Fr
OL	77	Jack Karhu	Jr
RB	27	Jason Lee	Sr
OL	69	Quinton Lewis	Fr
WR	16	Ryan Lindley	Sr
WR	81	Aidan Maloney	Sr
TE	50	Ben Mann	Jr
OL	53	Ryan McCann	Sr
QB	15	Brogan McCaughey	So
WR	84	Donovan McKoy	Fr
OL	76	Jonathan Mendoza	Sr
OL	57	Joseph Nash	So
WR	2	Chase Nenad	Sr
WR	10	David Pantelis	Jr
RB	0	Tre Peterson	Sr
RB	7	Joshua Pitsenberger	So
WR	25	Cameron Price	So
OL	50	Declan Savage	Jr
OL	62	Aaron Session	Jr
WR	30	Mason Shipp	Jr
OL	61	Connor Smith	Jr
TE	90	Graham Smith	Fr
TE	27	Kelvin Smith	Jr
OL	54	Jackson St. Aubyn	Fr
WR	17	Aidan Stephens	So
WR	19	Devyn Suggs	Sr
OL	60	Sean Sullivan	Jr
TE	82	Robby Tattersall	Fr
WR	11	CJ Thompson	Sr
WR	1	Mason Tipton	Sr
TE	89	Scott Truninger	So
QB	6	Austin Tutas	Jr
QB	5	Aidan Warner	Fr
OL	64	Andrew Weisz	Jr
OL	65	Lukas Witt	Fr
TE	44	Ry Yates	Jr

Defense

Pos.	#	Name	Class
DB	16	Damian Anderson	Jr
DL	99	Cooper Austin	Fr
LB	24	Inumidun Ayo-Durojaiye	Jr
LB	46	Jermaine Baker	Sr
DB	19	Kade Barnes	Sr
LB	34	Joseph Barry	Fr
DB	48	Brandon Benn	Sr
LB	7	Jacob Biggs	Jr
LB	13	Nathaniel Campbell	Sr
DL	37	James Cave	Fr
LB	56	Michael Connor	Jr
DB	12	Osize Daniyan	Fr
DB	21	Dylan Darville	Fr
DL	91	Zion Dayne	Sr
DB	8	Tyler Dilenno	Sr
DL	51	Ejiroghene Egodogbare	So
DL	93	Babawale Fadeyibi	Fr
DB	18	Da'Quan Gonzales	So
DB	20	Joseph Gonzales	Jr
DB	32	Phoenix Grant	Fr
DL	2	Alvin Gulley, Jr.	Jr
DB	3	Sean Guyton	Jr
DB	35	Zack Haaland	Jr
DB	11	Dathan Hickey	Sr
DL	45	Zairion Jackson-Bass	Fr
DL	94	Kevin Jourdain	Jr
DB	22	Abu Kamara	Fr
DB	29	John Kemp	Fr
DL	33	Ezekiel Larry	So
DL	14	Marcus Mauney	Sr
DL	9	Tamatoa McDonough	Jr
DL	42	Spencer Mermans	Fr
DL	30	Jack Michalik	Jr
DL	95	Isaac Mitchell	Sr
LB	15	Hamilton Moore	Sr
DB	4	Wande Owens	Sr
DL	40	Raleigh Oxendine	Jr
DL	97	Clay Patterson	Sr
DL	36	Wyatt Raymond	Jr
DB	1	Archie Russ III	Sr
DB	5	Jacob Saffold	Sr
LB	47	Jesse Schutzman	Fr
DL	43	Micaiah Shaber	So
LB	52	Dean Shaffer	Jr
DB	6	Joshua Tarver	So
DL	96	Jaylin Tate	Fr
LB	42	Andre Thomas	So
DL	49	Mitchell Tyler	Sr
DB	23	Ruben Valenzuela	So
LB	10	Joseph Vaughn	Sr
LB	31	Walker Warncke	Jr
DB	17	Brandon Webster	Fr
LB	41	Melik Williams	So
DL	98	Dylan Yang	So

Special teams

Pos.	#	Name	Class
P, K	45	Jack Bosman	Sr
K, P	26	Nick Conforti	So
K, P	39	Shamus Florio	Jr
LS	55	Joey Fortner	Fr

Head coach

- Tony Reno

Coordinators/assistant coaches

- Sean McGowan – Head coach of defense/linebackers
- Chris Ostrowsky – Offensive coordinator/quarterbacks
- Steven Vashel – Special teams coordinator/outside linebackers/specialists
- Jay Anderson – Co-defensive coordinator/defensive backs
- Stefon Wheeler – Run game coordinator/offensive line
- Tim Janecek – Defensive line
- Marcus Knight – Wide receivers
- Paul Rice – Tight ends
- Chris Bergeski – Running backs
- Alex Kurtz – Director of recruiting
- Larry Ciotti – Advisor to head coach
- Elijah Weeks – Director of player development
- Anthony Belanger – Director of sports performance & student-athlete innovation
- Spencer Field – Assistant strength & conditioning coach
- John Vecchio – Assistant data analytics specialist

Legend

- (C) Team captain
- (S) Suspended
- (I) Ineligible
- Injured
- Redshirt

Roster
Last update: September 16, 2023

== NFL draft ==
The 2024 NFL draft was held at Campus Martius Park in Detroit, Michigan, on April 25–27, 2024. Additionally, Mason Tipton was signed as an undrafted free agent.

Bulldogs who were picked in the 2024 NFL Draft:

Round	Pick	Player	Position	NFL team
3	75	Kiran Amegadjie	OL	Chicago Bears
