= 2023 Brown Bears football team =

American college football season

2023 Brown Bears football
- Conference: Ivy League
- Record: 5–5 (3–4 Ivy)
- Head coach: James Perry (4th season)
- Offensive coordinator: Ryan Mattison (2nd season)
- Offensive scheme: Air raid
- Defensive coordinator: Tim Weaver (4th season)
- Base defense: 3–4
- Home stadium: Richard Gouse Field at Brown Stadium

2023 Ivy League football standings
	Conf.			Overall
Team	W		L	W		L
Harvard +	5	–	2	8	–	2
Yale +	5	–	2	7	–	3
Dartmouth +	5	–	2	6	–	4
Princeton	4	–	3	5	–	5
Brown	3	–	4	5	–	5
Penn	3	–	4	6	–	4
Cornell	2	–	5	3	–	7
Columbia	1	–	6	3	–	7
+ – Conference co-champions; Rankings from STATS Poll

The 2023 Brown Bears football team represented Brown University as a member of the Ivy League during the 2023 NCAA Division I FCS football season. Led by fourth-year head coach James Perry, the Bears compiled an overall record of 5–5 with a mark of 3–4 in conference play, tying for fifth place in the Ivy League. Brown played home games at Richard Gouse Field at Brown Stadium in Providence, Rhode Island.

== Preseason ==
=== Ivy League media poll ===
The Ivy League's preseason prediction poll was released on August 7, 2023. The Bears were predicted to finish last out of eight teams in the conference.

== Schedule ==
Date	Time	Opponent	Site	TV	Result	Attendance
September 16	4:00 p.m.	at Bryant*	Beirne Stadium; Smithfield, RI	ESPN+	W 29–25	1,443
September 22	7:00 p.m.	at Harvard	Harvard Stadium; Boston, MA	ESPN+	L 31–34	15,838
September 30	12:00 p.m.	Central Connecticut*	Richard Gouse Field at Brown Stadium; Providence, RI	ESPN+	W 42–20	1,426
October 7	12:00 p.m.	Rhode Island*	Richard Gouse Field at Brown Stadium; Providence, RI (rivalry)	ESPN+	L 30–34	4,124
October 14	12:00 p.m.	Princeton	Richard Gouse Field at Brown Stadium; Providence, RI	ESPN+	W 28–27 ^{OT}	5,690
October 21	1:00 p.m.	at Cornell	Schoellkopf Field; Ithaca, NY	ESPN+	L 14–36	3,612
October 27	7:00 p.m.	at Penn	Franklin Field; Philadelphia, PA	ESPNU	W 30–26	4,735
November 4	12:00 p.m.	Yale	Richard Gouse Field at Brown Stadium; Providence, RI	NESN, ESPN+	L 17–36	4,805
November 11	12:30 p.m.	at Columbia	Robert K. Kraft Field at Lawrence A. Wien Stadium; New York, NY	ESPN+	W 21–14 ^{OT}	4,007
November 18	12:00 p.m.	Dartmouth	Richard Gouse Field at Brown Stadium; Providence, RI	NESN, ESPN+	L 13–38	1,531
*Non-conference game; All times are in Eastern time

== Game summaries ==
=== At Bryant ===
	1	2	3	4	Total
Bears	7	9	0	13	29
Bulldogs	0	10	7	8	25

Statistics	BRWN	BRY
First downs	27	23
Total yards	428	435
Rushing yards	73	173
Passing yards	355	262
Turnovers	0	4
Time of possession	34:57	25:03

Team	Category	Player	Statistics
Brown	Passing	Jake Wilcox	36/49, 355 yards, 3 TD
Brown	Rushing	Stockton Owen	14 rushes, 54 yards, TD
Brown	Receiving	Wes Rockett	8 receptions, 121 yards, 2 TD
Bryant	Passing	Zevi Eckhaus	20/37, 262 yards, 2 TD, 2 INT
Bryant	Rushing	Fabrice Mukendi	14 rushes, 109 yards
Bryant	Receiving	Matthew Prochaska	6 receptions, 112 yards, TD

=== At Harvard ===
	1	2	3	4	Total
Bears	10	0	7	14	31
Crimson	0	14	13	7	34

Statistics	BRWN	HARV
First downs	29	24
Total yards	447	464
Rushing yards	81	261
Passing yards	366	203
Turnovers	0	1
Time of possession	34:25	25:35

Team	Category	Player	Statistics
Brown	Passing	Jake Wilcox	36/52, 366 yards, TD
Brown	Rushing	Jordan DeLucia	7 rushes, 26 yards
Brown	Receiving	Wes Rockett	9 receptions, 149 yards
Harvard	Passing	Charles DePrima	15/26, 203 yards, 3 TD, INT
Harvard	Rushing	Shane McLaughlin	16 rushes, 152 yards, TD
Harvard	Receiving	Cooper Barkate	10 receptions, 132 yards, TD

=== Central Connecticut ===
	1	2	3	4	Total
Blue Devils	0	13	7	0	20
Bears	7	14	21	0	42

Statistics	CCSU	BRWN
First downs	19	25
Total yards	368	460
Rushing yards	235	70
Passing yards	133	390
Turnovers	2	0
Time of possession	32:24	27:36

Team	Category	Player	Statistics
Central Connecticut	Passing	Ricky Ortega	11/20, 133 yards, TD, INT
Central Connecticut	Rushing	Elijah Howard	16 rushes, 146 yards, TD
Central Connecticut	Receiving	Malik Thomas	1 reception, 41 yards, TD
Brown	Passing	Jake Wilcox	26/39, 386 yards, 4 TD
Brown	Rushing	Stockton Owen	6 rushes, 21 yards
Brown	Receiving	Wes Rockett	8 receptions, 148 yards, TD

=== Rhode Island ===
	1	2	3	4	Total
Rams	6	14	14	0	34
Bears	10	10	7	3	30

Statistics	URI	BRWN
First downs	16	30
Total yards	389	444
Rushing yards	167	172
Passing yards	222	272
Turnovers	0	2
Time of possession	23:29	36:31

Team	Category	Player	Statistics
Rhode Island	Passing	Kasim Hill	16/30, 222 yards, 3 TD
Rhode Island	Rushing	Jaden McKinzie	12 rushes, 111 yards, TD
Rhode Island	Receiving	Marquis Buchanan	5 receptions, 84 yards, TD
Brown	Passing	Jake Wilcox	31/55, 272 yards, 2 INT
Brown	Rushing	Ian Franzoni	8 rushes, 55 yards, TD
Brown	Receiving	Wes Rockett	7 receptions, 90 yards

=== Princeton ===
	1	2	3	4	OT	Total
Tigers	7	7	7	0	6	27
Bears	7	0	0	14	7	28

Statistics	PRIN	BRWN
First downs	16	26
Total yards	324	470
Rushing yards	115	100
Passing yards	209	370
Turnovers	1	3
Time of possession	28:49	31:11

Team	Category	Player	Statistics
Princeton	Passing	Blake Stenstrom	21/40, 209 yards, 2 TD, INT
Princeton	Rushing	Ja'Derris Carr	13 rushes, 76 yards, TD
Princeton	Receiving	A. J. Barber	8 reception, 142 yards, TD
Brown	Passing	Jake Wilcox	34/56, 354 yards, 2 TD, 2 INT
Brown	Rushing	Stockton Owen	18 rushes, 68 yards, TD
Brown	Receiving	Mark Mahoney	8 receptions, 146 yards, TD

=== At Cornell ===
	1	2	3	4	Total
Bears	0	0	14	0	14
Big Red	7	13	13	3	36

Statistics	BRWN	COR
First downs	17	24
Total yards	298	434
Rushing yards	90	104
Passing yards	208	330
Turnovers	3	1
Time of possession	20:13	39:47

Team	Category	Player	Statistics
Brown	Passing	Jake Wilcox	19/39, 208 yards, 2 TD, 3 INT
Brown	Rushing	Jake Wilcox	7 rushes, 51 yards
Brown	Receiving	Graham Walker	2 receptions, 61 yards, TD
Cornell	Passing	Jameson Wang	27/39, 330 yards, 2 TD, INT
Cornell	Rushing	Ean Pope	10 rushes, 34 yards, TD
Cornell	Receiving	Nicholas Laboy	7 receptions, 87 yards

=== At Penn ===
	1	2	3	4	Total
Bears	3	17	10	0	30
Quakers	7	10	0	9	26

Statistics	BRWN	PENN
First downs	23	26
Total yards	360	410
Rushing yards	110	88
Passing yards	250	322
Turnovers	0	3
Time of possession	32:10	27:50

Team	Category	Player	Statistics
Brown	Passing	Jake Wilcox	26/37, 250 yards, 3 TD
Brown	Rushing	Jake Wilcox	9 rushes, 40 yards
Brown	Receiving	Mark Mahoney	7 receptions, 62 yards, TD
Penn	Passing	Aidan Sayin	32/55, 322 yards, 2 TD, 3 INT
Penn	Rushing	Jonathan Mulatu	4 rushes, 30 yards
Penn	Receiving	Jared Richardson	12 receptions, 122 yards, TD

=== Yale ===
	1	2	3	4	Total
Bulldogs	6	10	20	0	36
Bears	10	0	7	0	17

Statistics	YALE	BRWN
First downs	17	16
Total yards	410	334
Rushing yards	190	68
Passing yards	220	266
Turnovers	3	4
Time of possession	34:13	25:47

Team	Category	Player	Statistics
Yale	Passing	Nolan Grooms	15/27, 220 yards, 4 TD, 3 INT
Yale	Rushing	Nolan Grooms	21 rushes, 102 yards
Yale	Receiving	Mason Tipton	7 receptions, 123 yards, 3 TD
Brown	Passing	Jake Wilcox	20/38, 245 yards, INT
Brown	Rushing	Jake Wilcox	6 rushes, 22 yards
Brown	Receiving	Graham Walker	5 receptions, 87 yards

=== At Columbia ===
	1	2	3	4	OT	Total
Bears	0	7	0	7	7	21
Lions	7	0	0	7	0	14

Statistics	BRWN	COLU
First downs	24	17
Total yards	369	304
Rushing yards	104	128
Passing yards	265	176
Turnovers	0	0
Time of possession	29:13	30:47

Team	Category	Player	Statistics
Brown	Passing	Jake Wilcox	31/48, 265 yards, TD
Brown	Rushing	Stockton Owen	13 rushes, 59 yards, TD
Brown	Receiving	Mark Mahoney	4 receptions, 66 yards
Columbia	Passing	Joe Green	17/29, 128 yards, TD
Columbia	Rushing	Joey Giorgi	18 rushes, 51 yards
Columbia	Receiving	J. J. Jenkins	4 receptions, 70 yards, 2 TD

=== Dartmouth ===
	1	2	3	4	Total
Big Green	7	21	3	7	38
Bears	0	7	0	6	13

Statistics	DART	BRWN
First downs	18	20
Total yards	428	347
Rushing yards	386	98
Passing yards	42	249
Turnovers	1	2
Time of possession	35:08	24:52

Team	Category	Player	Statistics
Dartmouth	Passing	Jackson Proctor	6/10, 42 yards, TD, INT
Dartmouth	Rushing	Q. Jones	16 rushes, 124 yards, 2 TD
Dartmouth	Receiving	Paxton Scott	4 receptions, 21 yards
Brown	Passing	Jake Wilcox	20/37, 193 yards, TD, INT
Brown	Rushing	Stockton Owen	12 rushes, 49 yards
Brown	Receiving	Graham Walker	5 receptions, 92 yards, TD
