= 2023 Dartmouth Big Green football team =

American college football season

2023 Dartmouth Big Green football

Ivy League co-champion
- Conference: Ivy League
- Record: 6–4 (5–2 Ivy)
- Head coach: Sammy McCorkle (1st season)
- Offensive coordinator: Kevin Daft (6th season)
- Offensive scheme: Option
- Defensive coordinator: Don Dobes (13th season)
- Base defense: 4–3
- Home stadium: Memorial Field

2023 Ivy League football standings
	Conf.			Overall
Team	W		L	W		L
Harvard +	5	–	2	8	–	2
Yale +	5	–	2	7	–	3
Dartmouth +	5	–	2	6	–	4
Princeton	4	–	3	5	–	5
Brown	3	–	4	5	–	5
Penn	3	–	4	6	–	4
Cornell	2	–	5	3	–	7
Columbia	1	–	6	3	–	7
+ – Conference co-champions; Rankings from STATS Poll

The 2023 Dartmouth Big Green football team represented Dartmouth College in the 2023 NCAA Division I FCS football season as a member of the Ivy League. The team was led by interim head coach Sammy McCorkle, who took over after 23-year head coach Buddy Teevens was hospitalized due to injuries sustained in an accident where Teevens was struck by a truck while riding his bike in March 2023. Teevens later died on September 19, 2023, three days after the season opener. McCorkle was later promoted from interim head coach to permanent head coach on October 19. With three straight conference victories against Princeton, Cornell, and Brown in the final three weeks of the season, in combination with a Yale victory over Harvard in the season's final week, the Dartmouth Big Green won a share of the Ivy League title. They played their home games at Memorial Field.

Following the season's conclusion, Sammy McCorkle was named the Ivy League Coach of the Year for 2023. Additionally, nine Dartmouth players won a total of ten all-Ivy League selections, tying with Harvard, Yale, and Penn. Offensive lineman Nick Schwitzgebel, defensive lineman Charlie Looes, and kicker Owen Zalc won first-team honors. Receiver Paxton Scott, defensive lineman Josiah Green, linebackers Macklin Ayers and Marques White, and Sean Williams (as both defensive back and right safety) won second-team honors. Offensive lineman Delby Lemieux and Kyle Brown, quarterback Nick Howard, running back Q Jones, and tight end Nic Sani received honorable mentions.

== Schedule ==
Date	Time	Opponent	Site	TV	Result	Attendance
September 16	6:00 p.m.	at No. 11 New Hampshire*	Wildcat Stadium; Durham, NH (rivalry)	FloSports	L 7–24	8,330
September 23	1:30 p.m.	Lehigh*	Memorial Field; Hanover, NH	ESPN+	W 34–17	3,641
September 30	1:00 p.m.	at Penn	Franklin Field; Philadelphia, PA	ESPN+	W 23–20 ^{OT}	7,970
October 7	1:30 p.m.	Yale	Memorial Field; Hanover, NH	ESPN+	L 24–31	2,880
October 14	1:00 p.m.	at Colgate*	Andy Kerr Stadium; Hamilton, NY	ESPN+	L 24–27 ^{OT}	2,732
October 21	1:30 p.m.	Columbia^{†}	Memorial Field; Hanover, NH	ESPN+	W 20–9	4,188
October 28	4:00 p.m.	at Harvard	Harvard Stadium; Boston, MA (rivalry)	NESN, ESPN+	L 9–17	22,515
November 3	7:00 p.m.	Princeton	Memorial Field; Hanover, NH	ESPNU	W 23–21	2,526
November 11	1:30 p.m.	Cornell	Memorial Field; Hanover, NH (rivalry)	ESPN+	W 30–14	2,530
November 18	12:00 p.m.	at Brown	Brown Stadium; Providence, RI	NESN, ESPN+	W 38–13	1,531
*Non-conference game; ^{†}Homecoming; Rankings from STATS Poll released prior to the game; All times are in Eastern time
