= Tipton (surname) =

Tipton is a surname. Notable people with the surname include:

- Alexis Tipton (born 1989), American voice actress
- Billy Tipton (1914–1989), American jazz musician
- Eddie Raymond Tipton, perpetrator of Hot Lotto fraud scandal
- Elizabeth Tipton, American statistician
- Eric Tipton (1915–2001), American Major League Baseball player and college baseball and football coach
- Frank Tipton (born 1943), Australian historian
- Glenn Tipton (born 1947), English guitarist
- James Tipton, American politician
- Jennifer Tipton (born 1937), American lighting designer
- John Tipton (1786–1839), American politician
- John Tipton (Tennessee frontiersman) (1730–1813), American frontiersman and statesman
- Joe Tipton (1922–1994), American baseball catcher
- Lio Tipton, credited as Analeigh Tipton through to 2021 (born 1988), American actress
- Mason Tipton (born 2000), American football player
- Matthew Tipton (born 1980), Welsh footballer and manager
- Richard Tipton (1892–1919), British Army officer and pilot.
- Scott Tipton (born 1956), American politician
- Thomas Tipton (1817–1899), American politician
- Thomas F. Tipton (1833–1904), American politician
- Fredrick Tipton (born 1982), a.k.a. Freddie Gibbs, African-American rapper
- William Dolley Tipton (1892–1945), American World War I fighter pilot

== Fictional characters ==
- John Beresford Tipton, the title benefactor of The Millionaire (TV series), a 1955–1960 American television series
- London Tipton, from The Suite Life of Zack & Cody

== See also ==
- H. Tipton Steck (1888–1953) American screenwriter
