= Mark Fabish =

American football coach (born 1975)

Current position
- Title: Head coach
- Team: Peddie School (NJ)
- Record: 2–6

Biographical details
- Born: May 10, 1975 (age 51); Ho-Ho-Kus, New Jersey, U.S.

Playing career
- 1993–1996: Penn
- Position: Wide receiver

Coaching career (HC unless noted)
- 1997: Don Bosco Preparatory HS (ST)
- 1998–1999: Monmouth (WR)
- 2000–2001: Monmouth (QB)
- 2002–2007: Monmouth (OC)
- 2008: Rhode Island (QB/WR)
- 2009: Penn (TE)
- 2010–2014: Penn (PGC/WR)
- 2015: Columbia (WR)
- 2016–2022: Columbia (OC/TE)
- 2023: Columbia (interim HC)
- 2024–present: Peddie School (NJ)

Administrative career (AD unless noted)
- 2008: Rhode Island (RC)

Head coaching record
- Overall: 3–7 (college); 2–6 (high school)

Mark Fabish (born May 10, 1975) is an American college football coach and former player. He is the head football coach for Peddie School, a position he has held since 2024. He was the interim head coach for Columbia University in 2023. He played college football for the Penn Quakers and has also coached at Don Bosco Preparatory HS, Monmouth, Rhode Island and Penn. He is currently serving as the head coach for The Peddie School.

== Early life and education ==
Fabish was born in 1974/1975 and grew up in Ho-Ho-Kus, New Jersey. He attended Bergen Catholic High School and helped them win consecutive state championships while catching passes from Mark DeRosa. He received little attention from colleges due to his small size (Fabish was 5 ft 10 in and 166 pounds by 1996) but ended up joining the Penn Quakers in 1993, being part of Al Bagnoli's first recruiting class at the school.

Fabish caught 17 passes and averaged 18.4 yards-per-catch as a sophomore in 1994, before averaging 15.1 yards on 18 catches as a junior in 1995. In his final year, he led the team with 29 receptions for 302 yards and was named their most valuable senior. Fabish totaled 69 receptions for 928 yards and nine touchdowns in his college career. He also served as their return specialist, and as of 2023 still holds the school's all-time records for return touchdowns, kickoff return yards and punt return yards. After graduating, Fabish had tryouts with several teams in the Arena Football League (AFL) and attended the minicamp of the Atlanta Falcons, but was not signed.

== Coaching career ==
Fabish began his coaching career in 1997, serving for one season as the special teams coordinator at Don Bosco Preparatory High School. He then served from 1998 to 1999 as the wide receivers coach for the Monmouth Hawks and from 2000 to 2001 as their quarterbacks coach, before being promoted to offensive coordinator in 2002. He helped them win their first mid-major national championship in 2004 and continued serving with them through 2007.

Fabish joined the Rhode Island Rams as wide receivers coach, quarterbacks coach and recruiting coordinator in 2008, facing off against his former team, Monmouth, in the season opener. In 2009, he was named tight ends coach at his alma mater, Penn. He switched to being their wide receivers coach and added the responsibility of passing game coordinator in 2010; he served in these roles through 2014. Fabish joined the Columbia Lions as their wide receivers coach in 2015. In 2016, he was promoted to offensive coordinator and also began serving as tight ends coach. Fabish remained in these positions until 2023, when he was named the team's interim head coach after the retirement of Al Bagnoli, by whom he was recruited by to play college football 30 years earlier. In his sole season as head coach, he led the team to a 3–7 season. He was not retained following the season.

In 2024, Fabish was hired as the head football coach for the Peddie School.

== Head coaching record ==
=== College ===
Year	Team	Overall	Conference	Standing	Bowl/playoffs
Columbia Lions (Ivy League) (2023)
2023	Columbia	3–7	1–6	8th	
Columbia:		3–7	1–6		
Total:		3–7			

=== High school ===
Year	Team	Overall	Conference	Standing	Bowl/playoffs
Peddie School Falcons () (2024–present)
2024	Peddie School	2–6	1–2		
Peddie School:		2–6	1–2		
Total:		2–6			
