= 2023 Columbia Lions football team =

American college football season

2023 Columbia Lions football
- Conference: Ivy League
- Record: 3–7 (1–6 Ivy)
- Head coach: Mark Fabish (interim, 1st season)
- Offensive coordinator: Joe D'Orazio (1st season)
- Defensive coordinator: Justin Stovall (2nd season)
- Home stadium: Robert K. Kraft Field at Lawrence A. Wien Stadium

2023 Ivy League football standings
	Conf.			Overall
Team	W		L	W		L
Harvard +	5	–	2	8	–	2
Yale +	5	–	2	7	–	3
Dartmouth +	5	–	2	6	–	4
Princeton	4	–	3	5	–	5
Brown	3	–	4	5	–	5
Penn	3	–	4	6	–	4
Cornell	2	–	5	3	–	7
Columbia	1	–	6	3	–	7
+ – Conference co-champions; Rankings from STATS Poll

The 2023 Columbia Lions football team represented Columbia University as a member of the Ivy League during the 2023 NCAA Division I FCS football season. The team was led by interim head coach Mark Fabish and played its home games at Robert K. Kraft Field at Lawrence A. Wien Stadium.

== Schedule ==
Date	Time	Opponent	Site	TV	Result	Attendance
September 16	12:30 p.m.	at Lafayette*	Fisher Stadium; Easton, PA	ESPN+	L 3–24	4,523
September 23	12:30 p.m.	Georgetown*	Robert K. Kraft Field at Lawrence A. Wien Stadium; New York, NY	SNY/ESPN+	W 30–0	3,197
September 29	7:00 p.m.	at Princeton	Powers Field at Princeton Stadium; Princeton, NJ	ESPNU	L 7–10	5,843
October 7	12:30 p.m.	Marist*	Robert K. Kraft Field at Lawrence A. Wien Stadium; New York, NY	ESPN+	W 16–0	2,873
October 14	1:30 p.m.	Penn^{†}	Robert K. Kraft Field at Lawrence A. Wien Stadium; New York, NY	SNY/ESPN+	L 17–20	8,032
October 21	1:30 p.m.	at Dartmouth	Memorial Field; Hanover, NH	ESPN+	L 9–20	4,188
October 28	12:00 p.m.	at Yale	Yale Bowl; New Haven, CT	ESPN+	L 7–35	5,422
November 4	12:30 p.m.	Harvard	Robert K. Kraft Field at Lawrence A. Wien Stadium; New York, NY	ESPN+	L 24–38	3,723
November 11	12:30 p.m.	Brown	Robert K. Kraft Field at Lawrence A. Wien Stadium; New York, NY	ESPN+	L 14–21 ^{OT}	4,007
November 18	1:00 p.m.	at Cornell	Schoellkopf Field; Ithaca, NY (rivalry)	ESPN+	W 29–14	3,743
*Non-conference game; ^{†}Homecoming; All times are in Eastern time
