= 2023 Princeton Tigers football team =

American college football season

2023 Princeton Tigers football
- Conference: Ivy League
- Record: 5–5 (4–3 Ivy)
- Head coach: Bob Surace (13th season)
- Offensive coordinator: Mike Willis (3rd season)
- Offensive scheme: Spread
- Defensive coordinator: Steve Verbit (10th season)
- Base defense: 4–2–5
- Captains: Liam Johnson; Ozzie Nicholas; Blake Stenstrom; Jalen Travis
- Home stadium: Powers Field at Princeton Stadium

2023 Ivy League football standings
	Conf.			Overall
Team	W		L	W		L
Harvard +	5	–	2	8	–	2
Yale +	5	–	2	7	–	3
Dartmouth +	5	–	2	6	–	4
Princeton	4	–	3	5	–	5
Brown	3	–	4	5	–	5
Penn	3	–	4	6	–	4
Cornell	2	–	5	3	–	7
Columbia	1	–	6	3	–	7
+ – Conference co-champions; Rankings from STATS Poll

The 2023 Princeton Tigers football team represented Princeton University as a member of the Ivy League during the 2023 NCAA Division I FCS football season. The team was led by 13th-year head coach Bob Surace and played its home games at Powers Field at Princeton Stadium.

== Schedule ==
Date	Time	Opponent	Site	TV	Result	Attendance
September 16	4:00 p.m.	at San Diego*	Torero Stadium; San Diego, CA	ESPN+	W 23–12	1,791
September 23	3:00 p.m.	Bryant*	Powers Field at Princeton Stadium; Princeton, NJ	ESPN+	L 13–16 ^{OT}	4,004
September 29	7:00 p.m.	Columbia	Powers Field at Princeton Stadium; Princeton, NJ	ESPNU	W 10–7	5,843
October 7	1:00 p.m.	Lafayette*	Powers Field at Princeton Stadium; Princeton, NJ	ESPN+	L 9–12	4,059
October 14	12:00 p.m.	at Brown	Brown Stadium; Providence, RI	ESPN+	L 27–28 ^{OT}	5,690
October 21	1:00 p.m.	No. 18 Harvard	Powers Field at Princeton Stadium; Princeton, NJ (rivalry)	NBCSP/SNY/ESPN+	W 21–14	8,345
October 28	1:00 p.m.	at Cornell	Schoellkopf Field; Ithaca, NY	ESPN+	W 14–3	5,525
November 3	7:00 p.m.	at Dartmouth	Memorial Field; Hanover, NH	ESPNU	L 21–23	2,526
November 11	12:00 p.m.	Yale	Powers Field at Princeton Stadium; Princeton, NJ (rivalry)	ESPNU	L 28–36 ^{2OT}	7,157
November 18	1:00 p.m.	at Penn	Franklin Field; Philadelphia, PA (rivalry)	ESPN+	W 31–24	5,256
*Non-conference game; Rankings from STATS Poll released prior to the game; All times are in Eastern time
