= 2023 Penn Quakers football team =

American college football season

2023 Penn Quakers football
- Conference: Ivy League
- Record: 6–4 (3–4 Ivy)
- Head coach: Ray Priore (8th season)
- Offensive coordinator: Dan Swanstrom (2nd season)
- Offensive scheme: No-huddle spread option
- Defensive coordinator: Bob Benson (8th season)
- Base defense: 3–3–5
- Home stadium: Franklin Field

2023 Ivy League football standings
	Conf.			Overall
Team	W		L	W		L
Harvard +	5	–	2	8	–	2
Yale +	5	–	2	7	–	3
Dartmouth +	5	–	2	6	–	4
Princeton	4	–	3	5	–	5
Brown	3	–	4	5	–	5
Penn	3	–	4	6	–	4
Cornell	2	–	5	3	–	7
Columbia	1	–	6	3	–	7
+ – Conference co-champions; Rankings from STATS Poll

The 2023 Penn Quakers football team represented the University of Pennsylvania as a member of the Ivy League during the 2023 NCAA Division I FCS football season. The team was led by eight-year head coach Ray Priore and played home games at Franklin Field in Philadelphia.

== Schedule ==
Date	Time	Opponent	Site	TV	Result	Attendance
September 16	1:00 p.m.	at Colgate*	Andy Kerr Stadium; Hamilton, NY	ESPN+	W 20–6	3,627
September 23	3:30 p.m.	at Bucknell*	Christy Mathewson-Memorial Stadium; Lewisburg, PA	ESPN+	W 37–21	2,046
September 30	1:00 p.m.	Dartmouth	Franklin Field; Philadelphia, PA	NBCSP/ESPN+	L 20–23 ^{OT}	7,970
October 7	1:00 p.m.	Georgetown*	Franklin Field; Philadelphia, PA	ESPN+	W 42–39 ^{OT}	2,250
October 14	1:30 p.m.	at Columbia	Robert K. Kraft Field at Lawrence A. Wien Stadium; New York, NY	ESPN+	W 20–17	8,032
October 21	12:00 p.m.	at Yale	Yale Bowl; New Haven, CT	ESPN+	W 27–17	3,817
October 27	7:00 p.m.	Brown	Franklin Field; Philadelphia, PA	ESPNU	L 26–30	4,735
November 4	1:00 p.m.	Cornell^{†}	Franklin Field; Philadelphia, PA (rivalry)	ESPN+	W 23–8	9,408
November 11	1:00 p.m.	at No. 24 Harvard	Harvard Stadium; Boston, MA (rivalry)	ESPN+	L 23–25 ^{3OT}	7,032
November 18	1:00 p.m.	Princeton	Franklin Field; Philadelphia, PA (rivalry)	ESPN+	L 24–31	5,256
*Non-conference game; ^{†}Homecoming; Rankings from STATS Poll released prior to the game; All times are in Eastern time
