= Tipton Municipal Borough =

Former local government area in the UK

Tipton Municipal Borough was a municipal borough centred on the town of Tipton, Staffordshire (now West Midlands), England. It was created in 1938, when the Tipton Urban District (formed in 1894) received borough status.

Tipton became a municipal borough on 1 October 1938, after 19 years of campaigning by the former UDC's councillors for borough status.

Having previously been based at the Public Offices in Owen Street, the council had transferred to a decade-old building previously owned by Bean Cars at Sedgley Road West in the west of the town near the border with Coseley. The council remained at these offices until the dissolution of Tipton council in April 1966, after which the buildings were used by Dudley College for 27 years, and since 1993 have been used by various private sector firms.

The dissolution of Tipton Municipal Borough saw the bulk of the authority absorbed into an expanded borough of West Bromwich, while most of the Tividale area of Tipton was absorbed into the new County Borough of Warley (centred on the towns of Oldbury, Smethwick and Rowley Regis) and a small section of the Tipton Green area (including the former council offices in Sedgley Road West) was absorbed into an expanded County Borough of Dudley.

== Sources ==
- Britain in Old Photographs (John Brimble and Keith Hodgkins, 1995)
