= Kiran Amegadjie =

American football player (born 2002)

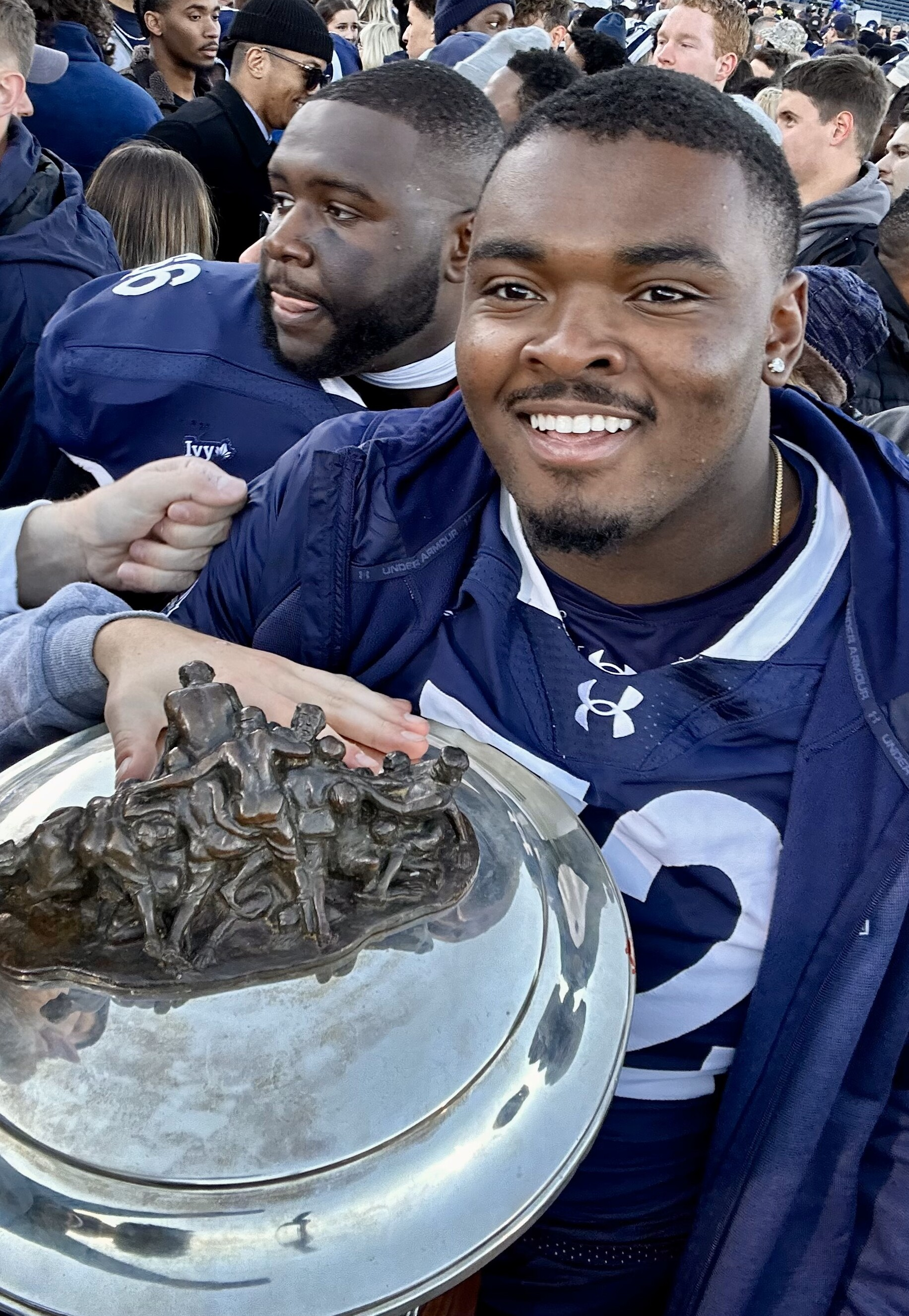
- Amegadjie with the Ivy League Football trophy and Bennie Anderson

No. 73 – Philadelphia Eagles
- Position: Offensive tackle
- Roster status: Practice squad

Personal information
- Born: February 1, 2002 (age 24); Hinsdale, Illinois, U.S.
- Listed height: 6 ft 5 in (1.96 m)
- Listed weight: 326 lb (148 kg)

Career information
- High school: Hinsdale Central
- College: Yale (2020–2023)
- NFL draft: 2024: 3rd round, 75th overall pick

Career history
- Chicago Bears (2024–2025); Philadelphia Eagles (2026–present)*
- * Offseason or practice squad member only

Awards and highlights
- First-team FCS All-American (2023); First-team All-Ivy (2022)

Career NFL statistics as of 2025
- Games played: 6
- Games started: 1
- Stats at Pro Football Reference

Kiran Amegadjie (/kɪˈrɑːn ɑːmɛˈɡɑːdʒiː/ kih-RAHN ah-meh-GAH-jee; born February 1, 2002) is an American professional football offensive tackle for the Philadelphia Eagles of the National Football League (NFL). He played college football for the Yale Bulldogs, earning all-Ivy honors in 2022. He was selected by the Chicago Bears in the third round of the 2024 NFL draft.

== Early life ==
Amegadjie grew up in Hinsdale, Illinois and attended Hinsdale Central High School. He was ranked among the top-300 offensive lineman in the class of 2020 and led the team with 25 wins for over three seasons. He was rated a two-star recruit and committed to play college football at Yale over offers from Central Michigan, Indiana State and Southern Illinois.

== College career ==
Amegadjie's freshman season at Yale in 2020 was canceled due to the COVID-19 pandemic. During the 2021 season, he played in and started every game at right guard. During the 2022 season, he started all 10 games at left tackle and was named first-team All-Ivy League. During the 2023 season, he played only four games due to a season-ending injury that required him having surgery. Amegadjie declared for the 2024 NFL draft following the 2023 season.

== Professional career ==
Pre-draft measurables
Height	Weight	Arm length	Hand span	Wingspan	Bench press
6 ft 5 3/8 in (1.97 m)	323 lb (147 kg)	36 1/8 in (0.92 m)	9 5/8 in (0.24 m)	7 ft 1 1/2 in (2.17 m)	21 reps
All values from NFL Combine/Pro Day

=== Chicago Bears ===
Amegadjie was selected in the third round with the 75th overall pick by the Chicago Bears in the 2024 NFL draft. Following various injuries and underwhelming play, he was released Chicago on August 30, 2026 as a part of roster cuts.

=== Philadelphia Eagles ===
On September 1, 2026, Amegadjie was signed by the Philadelphia Eagles to their practice squad.
