= Murder of Jane Tipson =

2003 murder in Saint Lucia

Jane Tipson was a conservationist and animal rights activist who was murdered in the Caribbean island nation Saint Lucia in 2003. It is alleged that she was victim of a contract killing for her work against the construction of dolphinarium tourist attractions by the Dolphin Fantaseas group, and the Sea Shepherd Conservation Society has offered a $25,000 reward for information leading to her killer being brought to justice. They also alleged that Saint Lucia police contaminated the crime scene, and were treating the investigation as a low priority. Tipson was stopped on a private road that led to her home, and shot at close range in the back of her neck. Police were not discounting an anti-environmentalism motive, as there is substantial evidence to suggest that the murder was related to a proposed dolphinarium being built in St. Lucia.

However, her sister, who lived with her on the island and found her shortly after her murder, claimed that it was unlikely that her environmentalism had anything to do with her murder, and that she considered the police were trying their best to solve the case. Dolphin Fantaseas disclaimed any involvement.

Jane Tipson, originally hailing from Cornwall, United Kingdom, and having lived in Saint Lucia for three decades, had been a co-founder of the Eastern Caribbean Coalition for Environmental Awareness, and was active in many campaigns against captive whale and dolphin tourism activities, instead promoting whale watching and dolphin watching tourism. She was also the founder and president of Slaps, the Saint Lucia Animal Protection Society and owner of a local restaurant.
