= Jameson Wang =

American football player (born 2001)

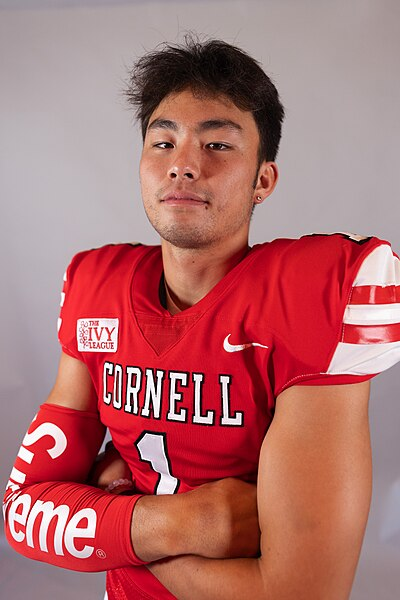

No. 16 – Fujifilm Ebina Minerva AFC
- Position: Quarterback

Personal information
- Born: July 30, 2001 (age 25); Los Angeles, California, U.S.
- Listed height: 6 ft 0 in (1.83 m)
- Listed weight: 210 lb (95 kg)

Career information
- High school: Oaks Christian (Westlake Village, California)
- College: Cornell (2021–2024)
- NFL draft: 2025: undrafted

Career history
- Frankfurt Galaxy (2025); Panthers Wrocław (2026–present); [[Fujifilm Ebina Minerva AFC (X-League)|

Awards and highlights
- AFLE MVP (2026); First-team All-Ivy League (2024); Second-team All-Ivy League (2023); Honorable Mention All-Ivy League (2022)

Jameson Wang
- Traditional Chinese: 王嘉漢
- Simplified Chinese: 王嘉汉
Transcriptions

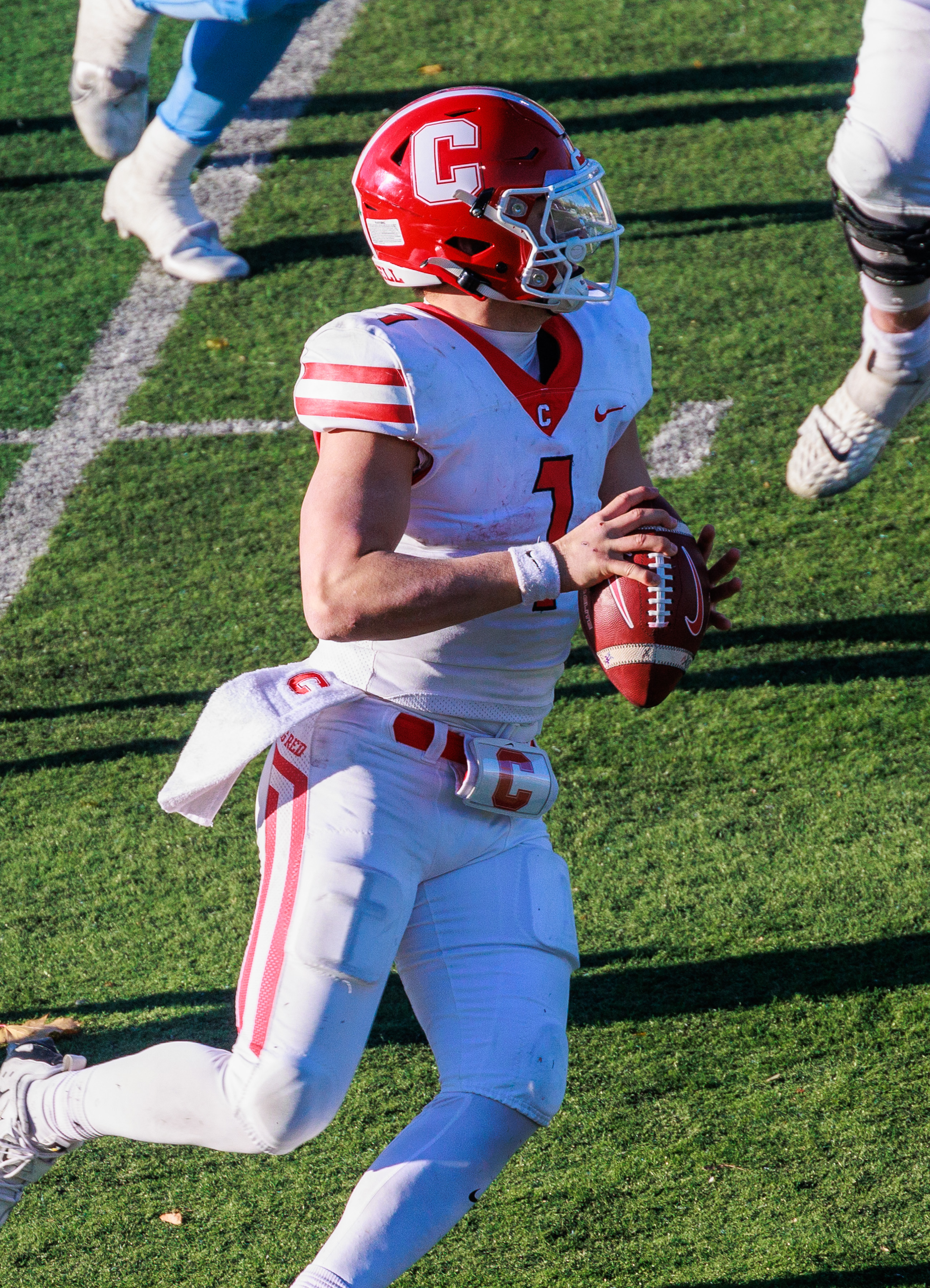
Wang in 2024

Jameson Jahan Wang (born July 30, 2001) is an American professional football quarterback for the Fujifilm Ebina Minerva AFC of the X-League. He played college football for the Cornell Big Red being the only Ivy League quarterback to record 50 passing touchdowns and 25 rushing touchdowns in a career. Wang also is the first Cornell freshman to throw and run for a touchdown in the same game.

== Early life ==
Jameson Wang was born on July 30, 2001, in Los Angeles, California. Wang, who is of Chinese descent, attended Harvard-Westlake School in Los Angeles and transferred to Oaks Christian School in Westlake Village, California, for his last year of high school football.

A three-star recruit, Wang originally committed to the United States Air Force Academy to play college football on February 5, 2020. He enrolled in the United States Air Force Academy Preparatory School, before announcing he would be transferring to Cornell University on August 21, 2021.

== College career ==
=== Freshman year ===
Wang made his college debut for Cornell on October 9, 2021 against the Harvard Crimson. Wang had three carries for 13 yards and became the first freshman to earn time at quarterback for the Big Red since 2014. The next week, he helped the Big Red earn their first win of the season against the Colgate Raiders, and received the Ivy League Rookie of the Week honor after his performance. Wang became the first Big Red quarterback to surpass 100 rushing yards in a game since 2009 after his performance against the Brown Bears, after recording 121 passing yards and 2 touchdowns, while also rushing for 101 yards and a touchdown.

=== Sophomore year ===
Wang made his first start for the Big Red against the VMI Keydets on September 17, 2022 for the season opener. Two weeks later against the Colgate Raiders, Wang completed 18-of-27 passes for a career-high 284 yards and a touchdown, and ran for 98 yards and two other touchdowns in a win at Colgate. Wang accounted for four touchdowns (three rushing, one passing) against the Harvard Crimson and three more against the Penn Quakers (two passing, one rushing). He became the first Cornell player to run for three touchdowns in a game since 2016 and the first player to account for four scores in a contest since 2016. Wang had a 53-yard run against Penn, the longest by a Big Red player since 2019 and had five games with multiple touchdown passes. Scoring 50 points, Wang became the first Cornell quarterback to lead the team in scoring since 2005. Honorable mention All-Ivy League accounted for a league-best 22 touchdowns (14 passing, 8 rushing) rushed for 559 yards (4.2 yards per carry) and passed for 1,650 yards and 14 scores (.573 completion percentage). Lastly ranked in the top 100 nationally in 14 offensive categories.

=== Junior year ===
To conclude his 2023 campaign, Wang earned second-team All-Ivy League honors. He led the Ivy League in completion percentage (64.8 percent), the completion percentage was good for 23rd nationally. He was third in the Ivy in passing yards (2,472 yards), passing yards per game (247.2 yards per game), and completions (243 completions). Wang scored the third most points in the Ivy by a non-kicker, accounting for nine passing touchdowns and a two-point conversion, while also rushing for eight more touchdowns on the ground. This helped him set the school record for most-career rushing touchdowns by a quarterback, which sits at 20 after the 2023 season. He finished second in the Ivy and eighth nationally in total offense, averaging 288 yards per game.

=== Senior year ===
Earned First-Team All-Ivy honors after a record-breaking senior season. He led the Ivy League in passing yards (2,533), passing touchdowns (24), total offense (303.3 yards per game), and points responsible for (188), ranking first in the FCS in points responsible for per game (18.8). Wang became the first player in Ivy League history to record 50 career passing touchdowns and 25 career rushing touchdowns, and finished top two in the Ivy League in eight offensive categories and top 10 in the FCS in four. He recorded 109 carries for 500 rushing yards and seven touchdowns, averaging 4.6 yards per carry while posting six games with 250+ passing yards, four with 50+ rushing yards, and eight games with three or more touchdowns accounted for. Wang was named Ivy League Offensive Player of the Week once in 2024, and started each of the final 30 games of his collegiate career, the longest streak in Big Red football history. He finished third in career passing yards (6,959) and 10th in career rushing yards (1,816), while accounting for 78 career touchdowns (No. 2 all-time at Cornell).

== Professional career ==
Pre-draft measurables
Height	Weight	Arm length	Hand span
6 ft 0 in (1.83 m)	210 lb (95 kg)	31 3/8 in (0.80 m)	9 3/8 in (0.24 m)
All values from Pro Day

Wang went undrafted in the 2025 NFL draft. On May 5, 2025, Wang received a Rookie Mini Camp invitation with the Los Angeles Chargers.

=== Frankfurt Galaxy ===
Wang was signed by the Frankfurt Galaxy of the European League of Football during the 2025 season. In the final 5 games Wang played in the regular season, he had 18 total touchdowns and 1,782 yards of total offense. The Galaxy finished the season with an 6–6 record.

=== Panthers Wrocław ===
Wang was signed by the Panthers Wrocław of the American Football League Europe (AFLE) ahead of the 2026 AFLE season.

== Career statistics ==
=== AFLE ===
Year	Team	Games			Passing									Rushing					Fumbles	
Year	Team	GP	GS	Record	Cmp	Att	Pct	Yds	Y/A	Lng	TD	Int	Rtg	Att	Yds	Avg	Lng	TD	Fum	Lost
2026	WPA	14	14	11-3	292	414	70.5	3,541	8.6	78	46	10	123.5	66	419	6.4	57	9	2	0
Career		14	14	11-3	292	414	70.5	3,541	8.6	78	46	10	123.5	66	419	6.4	57	9	2	0

=== ELF ===
Year	Team	Games			Passing									Rushing					Fumbles	
Year	Team	GP	GS	Record	Cmp	Att	Pct	Yds	Y/A	Lng	TD	Int	Rtg	Att	Yds	Avg	Lng	TD	Fum	Lost
2025	FGY	5	5	3–2	132	219	60.3	1,459	6.7	75	14	4	93.8	49	323	6.6	22	4	1	1
Career		5	5	3–2	132	219	60.3	1,459	6.7	75	14	4	93.8	49	323	6.6	22	4	1	1

=== College ===
Year	Team	Games			Passing							Rushing			
Year	Team	GP	GS	Record	Comp	Att	Yards	Pct	TD	Int	Rtg	Att	Yds	Avg	TD
2021	Cornell	7	0	—	26	41	304	63.4	4	4	138.4	64	349	5.5	4
2022	Cornell	10	10	5–5	150	262	1650	57.3	14	8	121.7	133	559	4.2	8
2023	Cornell	10	10	3–7	243	375	2472	64.8	9	8	123.9	118	408	3.5	8
2024	Cornell	10	10	4–6	244	378	2533	64.9	24	11	135.5	109	500	4.6	7
Career		37	30	12–18	663	1055	6959	62.9	51	31	128.0	424	1816	4.3	27

== Personal life ==
Wang's great-grandfather captained China's 1936 Olympic soccer team.
