= Richard Tipton =

Richard Tipton (25 April 1892 – 1919) was an officer in the British Army and the Royal Flying Corps (RFC).

Tipton's received his first commission was with the 3rd West Lancashire Artillery. Then in May 1915, he transferred to the RFC gaining his wings in June 1915. He was assigned to No. 14 Squadron, which by autumn 1915 was sent to support the Sinai and Palestine campaign. Here he received commendations from General Sir John Maxwell and General Sir Archibald Murray. However, on June 18, 1916, he was part of an air raid on El Arish.
