= Mason Tipton =

American football player (born 2000)

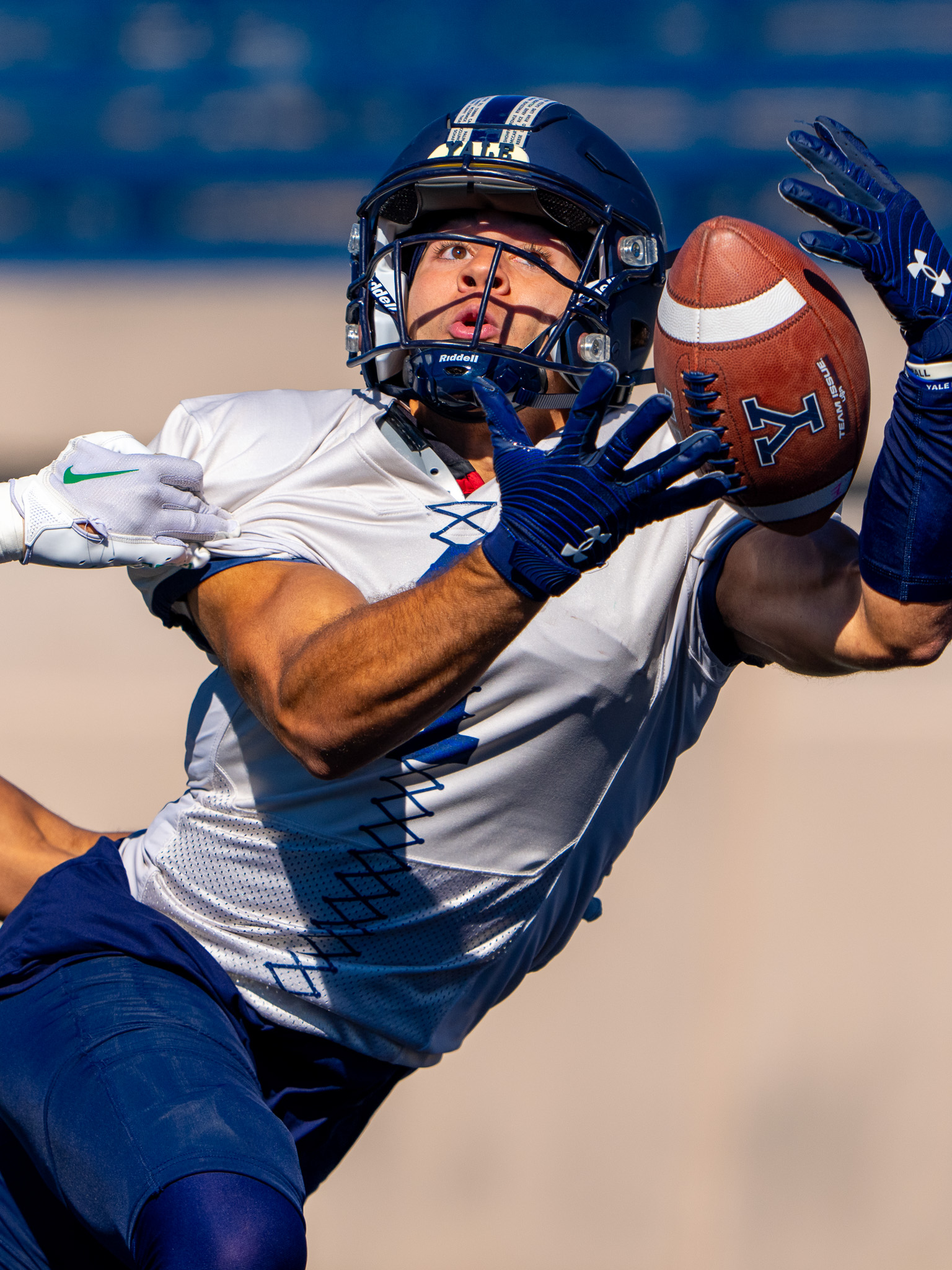
- Tipton catching a touchdown on October 8, 2022, at the Yale Bowl versus Dartmouth.

No. 15 – New Orleans Saints
- Position: Wide receiver
- Roster status: Physically unable to perform

Personal information
- Born: September 27, 2000 (age 26); Akron, Ohio, U.S.
- Listed height: 5 ft 11 in (1.80 m)
- Listed weight: 187 lb (85 kg)

Career information
- High school: Archbishop Hoban (Akron)
- College: Yale (2019–2023)
- NFL draft: 2024: undrafted

Career history
- New Orleans Saints (2024–present)

Awards and highlights
- First-team All-Ivy League (2023); Second-team All-Ivy League (2021)

Career NFL statistics as of 2025
- Receptions: 25
- Receiving yards: 175
- Stats at Pro Football Reference

Mason Tipton (born September 27, 2000) is an American professional football wide receiver for the New Orleans Saints of the National Football League (NFL). He played college football for the Yale Bulldogs.

== Early life ==
Tipton grew up in Akron, Ohio, and attended Archbishop Hoban High School. At Hoban, he played football and baseball and was a three-time state football champion. He committed to play college football for the Yale Bulldogs upon concluding his senior season over an offer from Kent State.

== College career ==
Tipton played football at Yale University from 2019 to 2023, appearing in 36 games and making 33 starts. During the 2023 season, Tipton was named a unanimous first-team All-Ivy selection. He finished third in school history in career receiving touchdowns with 19, fifth in career receptions with 132 and sixth in career receiving yards with 2,067.

== Professional career ==
Pre-draft measurables
Height	Weight	Arm length	Hand span	Wingspan	40-yard dash	10-yard split	20-yard split	20-yard shuttle	Three-cone drill	Vertical jump	Broad jump	Bench press
5 ft 10 1/8 in (1.78 m)	182 lb (83 kg)	29 1/2 in (0.75 m)	9 1/8 in (0.23 m)	5 ft 11 1/2 in (1.82 m)	4.34 s	1.46 s	2.50 s	4.22 s	7.05 s	37.0 in (0.94 m)	10 ft 5 in (3.18 m)	12 reps
All values from Pro Day

=== 2024 season ===
After not being selected in the 2024 NFL draft, Tipton signed with the New Orleans Saints as an undrafted free agent. Despite growing up as a fan of the Cleveland Browns, Tipton opted to sign with the Saints after meeting with both teams. Tipton was also selected by the Memphis Showboats of the UFL during the 2024 UFL draft, but chose not to sign with them.

After impressing during the Saints' training camp, head coach Dennis Allen compared Tipton to former undrafted free agent and All-Pro Chris Harris Jr., whom Allen coached as the Denver Broncos' defensive coordinator in 2011. Accordingly, he survived the Saints' roster cuts and made the team's initial 53 man roster. He played in 11 games with (including one start) as a rookie, recording 14 catches for 99 yards.

=== 2025 season ===
Tipton entered the 2025 season as one of New Orleans auxiliary wide receivers. Playing in 14 games for the Saints, he recorded 11 catches for 76 scoreless yards, also operating as a kick returner for the team. On January 2, 2026, Tipton was placed on season-ending injured reserve due to a groin injury.

=== 2026 season ===
Tipton began the 2026 season on the PUP list.

== Career statistics ==
=== NFL ===
Legend
**Bold**	Career high

Year	Team	Games		Receiving					Fumbles	
Year	Team	GP	GS	Rec	Yds	Avg	Lng	TD	Fum	Lost
2024	NO	11	1	**14**	**99**	**7.1**	**15**	0	0	0
2025	NO	**14**	**3**	11	76	6.9	12	0	**1**	0
Career		25	4	25	175	7.0	15	0	1	0

=== College ===
Year	Team	GP	Receiving				Rushing			
Year	Team	GP	Rec	Yds	Avg	TD	Att	Yds	Avg	TD
2019	Yale	10	91	1274	14	17	0	0	0	0
2020	Yale	Season canceled due to COVID-19 pandemic								
2021	Yale	10	97	1069	11	15	0	0	0	0
2022	Yale	10	99	1673	16.9	17	0	0	0	0
2023	Yale	10	169	2369	14.1	31	1	15	15.0	1
Career		40	456	6391	14	180	1	15	15.0	1

== Personal life ==
Tipton is the son of Lawrence and Angela Tipton. His father played football at Akron. His father was sentenced to two years in federal prison, and his mother was placed on four months of home confinement and probation after they were charged in federal court and pleaded guilty to conspiracy to defraud the United States.
