= Nicki Moore =

American athletic administrator

Current position
- Title: Athletic director
- Team: Cornell
- Conference: Ivy League

Biographical details
- Born: March 17, 1974 (age 52)
- Education: University of Missouri (BS, MA, PhD)

Playing career
- 1993–1996: Missouri
- Position: Track and field / cross country

Administrative career (AD unless noted)
- 2004–2010: Oklahoma (assistant AD)
- 2010–2015: Oklahoma (associate AD)
- 2015–2018: North Carolina (associate AD)
- 2018–2023: Colgate
- 2023–present: Cornell

Nicki Moore (born March 17, 1974) is an American athletic administrator who has been serving as director of athletics and physical education at Cornell University since November 2022.

== Education ==
From the University of Missouri, Moore received a Bachelor of Science with a major in secondary education in 1996, a Master of Arts in counseling psychology in 1998, and a Doctor of Philosophy in counseling psychology in 2002.

== Career ==
=== Assistant athletic director ===
She served as an assistant athletic director at the University of Oklahoma from 2004 to 2010, at the University of Oklahoma from 2010 to 2015, and at the University of North Carolina at Chapel Hill from 2015 to 2018.

=== Athletic director ===
Moore served as athletic director at Colgate University from 2018 to 2023. She was named the first female athletic director at Cornell University on November 30, 2022.
