= 2023 Sacred Heart Pioneers football team =

American college football season

2023 Sacred Heart Pioneers football
- Conference: Northeast Conference
- Record: 2–9 (2–5 NEC)
- Head coach: Mark Nofri (12th season)
- Offensive coordinator: Matt Gardner (7th season)
- Defensive coordinator: Mike Cooke (7th season)
- Home stadium: Campus Field

2023 Northeast Conference football standings
	Conf.			Overall
Team	W		L	W		L
Duquesne $^	6	–	1	7	–	5
Saint Francis (PA)	4	–	3	4	–	6
Merrimack	4	–	3	5	–	6
Stonehill *	4	–	3	5	–	5
LIU	4	–	3	4	–	7
Wagner	3	–	4	4	–	7
Sacred Heart	2	–	5	2	–	9
Central Connecticut	1	–	6	3	–	8
$ – Conference champion; ^ – FCS playoff participant; Note: Stonehill ineligible for NEC title and FCS postseason play due to transition from NCAA Division II; Rankings from STATS Poll

The 2023 Sacred Heart Pioneers football team represented Sacred Heart University as a member of the Northeast Conference (NEC) during the 2023 NCAA Division I FCS football season. Led by 11th-year head coach Mark Nofri, the Pioneers compiled an overall record of 2–9 with a mark of 2–5 in conference play, placing seventh in the NEC. Sacred Heart played home games at Campus Field in Fairfield, Connecticut.

== Schedule ==
Date	Time	Opponent	Site	TV	Result	Attendance
September 2	6:00 p.m.	Lafayette*	Campus Field; Fairfield, CT	NEC Front Row	L 14–19	5,634
September 9	12:30 p.m.	at Georgetown*	Cooper Field; Washington, DC	ESPN+	L 10–27	2,009
September 16	1:00 p.m.	Wagner	Campus Field; Fairfield, CT	NEC Front Row	L 10–17	5,174
September 23	12:00 p.m.	at Saint Francis (PA)	DeGol Field; Loretto, PA	NEC Front Row	W 37–34	1,167
September 30	1:00 p.m.	Merrimack	Campus Field; Fairfield, CT	NEC Front Row	L 7–17	8,552
October 7	1:00 p.m.	at LIU	Bethpage Federal Credit Union Stadium; Brookville, NY	NEC Front Row	L 13–23	2,339
October 14	12:00 p.m.	at Yale*	Yale Bowl; New Haven, CT	ESPN+	L 3–31	3,739
October 21	1:00 p.m.	at Stonehill	W.B. Mason Stadium; Easton, MA	NEC Front Row	L 19–22 ^{2OT}	2,422
October 28	12:00 p.m.	Duquesne^{†}	Campus Field; Fairfield, CT	ESPN+	L 0–27	6,822
November 4	12:00 p.m.	Central Connecticut	Campus Field; Fairfield, CT	NEC Front Row	W 31–24	5,547
November 18	12:00 p.m.	at UConn*	Rentschler Field; East Hartford, CT	WFSB	L 3–31	19,053
*Non-conference game; ^{†}Homecoming; All times are in Eastern time; Source:

== Game summaries ==
=== at UConn ===
Sacred Heart Pioneers at UConn Huskies – Game summary

Quarter	1	2	3	4	Total
Pioneers	0	3	0	0	3
Huskies	17	7	0	7	31

at Pratt & Whitney Stadium at Rentschler Field, East Hartford, Connecticut

- Date: November 18
- Game time: 12:03 p.m. EST
- Game weather: Cloudy, Wind NW 12 MPH, 52 °F (11 °C)
- Game attendance: 19,053
- Referee: Mike Roche
- TV announcers (WFSB): Randy Brochu & Marc Robbins
- Box Score

Game information
First quarter
- UCONN – McFadden, Joe 50 yd field goal, 8:50. Huskies 3–0. Drive: 8 plays, 30 yards, TOP 04:25
- UCONN – Ross, Cameron 46 yd pass from Roberson, Ta'Quan (McFadden, Joe kick), 5:45. Huskies 10–0. Drive: 4 plays, 68 yards, TOP 02:10
- UCONN – Joly, Justin 12 yd pass from Roberson, Ta'Quan (McFadden, Joe kick), 0:38. Huskies 17–0. Drive: 6 plays, 35 yards, TOP 03:39

Second quarter

- SHU – Renzi, Sam 24 yd field goal, 2:02. Huskies 17–3. Drive: 12 plays, 68 yards, TOP 05:16
- UCONN – Hicks, Kylish 14 yd pass from Roberson, Ta'Quan (McFadden, Joe kick), 0:17. Huskies 24–3. Drive: 13 plays, 74 yards, TOP 01:38

Fourth quarter

- UCONN – Buckman, Brett 11 yd pass from Roberson, Ta'Quan (McFadden, Joe kick), 5:37. Huskies 31–3. Drive: 10 plays, 67 yards, TOP 04:50

Statistics

Statistics	SHU	CONN
First downs	13	24
Total yards	224	407
Rushing yards	78	206
Passing yards	146	201
Turnovers	0	0
Time of possession	26:58	32:24

Team	Category	Player	Statistics
Sacred Heart	Passing	Rob McCoy	17/26, 146 yds
Sacred Heart	Rushing	Rob McCoy	9 att, 31 yds
Sacred Heart	Receiving	Aboraa Kwarteng	5 rec, 45 yds
Sacred Heart	Defense	Marques Mason	12 tackles
UConn	Passing	Ta'Quan Roberson	22/35, 201 yds, 4 TDs
UConn	Rushing	Cam Edwards	12 att, 90 yds
UConn	Receiving	Justin Joly	9 rec, 73 yds, 1 TD
UConn	Defense	Jackson Mitchell	11 tackles
