= 2021 Northeast Conference Football Championship Game =

College football game

- Conference Championship
Sacred Heart Pioneers	Duquesne Dukes
(3–1)	(4–0)
34	27
Head coach: Mark Nofri	Head coach: Jerry Schmitt
	1	2	3	4	OT	Total
Sacred Heart	6	6	15	0	7	34
Duquesne	7	0	6	14	0	27
- Date: April 11, 2021
- Season: 2020
- Stadium: Arthur J. Rooney Athletic Field
- Location: Pittsburgh, Pennsylvania

United States TV coverage
- Network: ESPN3
- Announcers: Paul Dottino (play-by-play), Rasheed Marshall (color)

2020 Northeast Conference football standings
	Conf.			Overall
Team	W		L	W		L
Duquesne y	4	–	0	4	–	1
Sacred Heart y$^	2	–	1	3	–	2
LIU	2	–	2	2	–	2
Bryant	2	–	2	2	–	2
Wagner	0	–	2	0	–	2
Merrimack*	0	–	3	0	–	3
Championship: Sacred Heart 34, Duquesne 27 (OT)
$ – Conference champion; y – Championship game participant; ^ – FCS playoff participant; Note: Due to COVID-19, the Northeast suspended the 2020 football season. * – Merrimack ineligible for NEC title and FCS postseason play due to transition to NCAA Division I Central Connecticut and Saint Francis (PA) opted out of the spring season.; Rankings from STATS Poll

The 2021 Northeast Conference Football Championship Game was a college football game played on Sunday, April 11, 2021, to determine the 2020–21 champion of the Northeast Conference. The game featured the Sacred Heart Pioneers and the Duquesne Dukes in the conference's first championship game.

== Teams ==
The game was played between Sacred Heart Pioneers and the Duquesne Dukes. This was the 17th overall meeting between the programs; Duquesne entered the game leading the all-time series, 12–4.

=== Sacred Heart Pioneers ===
Sacred Heart entered the game with a 3–1 record. Sacred Heart had been the Northeast Conference champions four times prior in 2001, 2013, 2014, and 2018.

=== Duquesne Dukes ===
Duquesne entered the game with a 4–0 record, claiming home field advantage in the game by virtue of their better record. Duquesne had been the Northeast Conference champions five times prior in 2011, 2013, 2015, 2016, and 2018.

== Game summary ==
2021 Northeastern Conference Football Championship Game

Quarter	1	2	3	4	OT	Total
Sacred Heart	6	6	15	0	7	34
Duquesne	7	0	6	14	0	27

at Arthur J. Rooney Athletic Field, Pittsburgh, PA

- Date: Sunday, April 11, 2021
- Game time: 2 p.m. EST
- Game weather: Cloudy • Temperature: 55 °F (13 °C) • Wind: NW 6 mph
- Game attendance: 400
- TV announcers (ESPN3): Paul Dottino (play-by-play), Rasheed Marshall (color)
- Box Score:

Game information

First quarter

- (8:08) Sacred Heart – Garrett Lynn 6-yard pass from Naseim Brantley (Noah Gettman PAT failed) (Drive: 9 plays, 54 yards, 4:28; Sacred Heart 6–0)
- (14:50) Duquesne – Billy Lucas 1-yard run (Brian Bruzdewicz kick) (Drive: 12 plays, 69 yards, 6:32; Duquesne 6–7)

Second quarter

- (10:32) Sacred Heart – Rob DiNota 7-yard pass from Marquez McCray (two-point run conversion failed) (Drive: 9 plays, 80 yards, 4:51; Sacred Heart 12–7)

Third quarter

- (3:19) Duquesne – Joey Isabella 11-yard pass from Joe Mischler (two-point pass conversion failed) (Drive: 7 plays, 65 yards, 3:19; Duquesne 12–13)
- (7:03) Sacred Heart – Malik Grant 1-yard run (Marquez McCray pass to Liam Cabri for two-point conversion) (Drive: 9 plays, 68 yards, 3:35; Sacred Heart 20–13)
- (3:25) Sacred Heart – Julius Chestnut 6-yard run (Noah Gettman kick) (Drive: 4 plays, 45 yards, 5:41; Sacred Heart 27–13)

Fourth quarter

- (3:06) Duquesne – Cyrus Holder 12-yard pass from Joe Mischler (Brian Bruzdewicz kick) (Drive: 11 plays, 75 yards, 2:45; Sacred Heart 27–20)
- (10:42) Duquesne – Joey Isabella 35-yard pass from Joe Mischler (Brian Bruzdewicz kick) (Drive: 5 plays, 98 yards, 1:36; Tied 27–27)

Overtime

- Sacred Heart - Naseim Brantley 29-yard pass from Marquez McCray (Noah Gettman kick) (Drive: 4 plays, 25 yards, 0:37; Sacred Heart 34–27)
