= Josh Sokol =

American football player (born 1997)

No. 60
- Position: Center

Personal information
- Born: December 1, 1997 (age 28); Hopkinton, Massachusetts, U.S.
- Listed height: 6 ft 3 in (1.91 m)
- Listed weight: 290 lb (132 kg)

Career information
- High school: Hopkinton
- College: Sacred Heart (2016–2021)
- NFL draft: 2022: undrafted

Career history
- Minnesota Vikings (2022)*; Birmingham Stallions (2024)*
- * Offseason or practice squad member only

Awards and highlights
- 2× First-team All-NEC (2019, 2020)
- Stats at Pro Football Reference

Josh Sokol (born December 1, 1997) is an American former professional football center. He played college football for the Sacred Heart Pioneers and was signed by the Minnesota Vikings as an undrafted free agent after the 2022 NFL draft.

== Early life ==
Sokol was born in Hopkinton, Massachusetts, and played high school football for the local team at Hopkinton High School, where he played as a center and a defensive end. Josh was also a two time state champion heavy weight wrestler for Hopkinton high.

== College career ==
Sokol attended Sacred Heart University, in Fairfield, Connecticut.

He served as the team captain in 2019 and 2020 seasons, playing all 12 games in 2019, also started all 12 games in 2018. He was named first-team all-NEC in 2019 and 2020.

== Professional career ==
=== Minnesota Vikings ===
After not being drafted, he was signed by the Minnesota Vikings on July 30, 2022. He was waived on August 30, 2022, and re-signed to the practice squad one day later. He signed a reserve/future contract on January 16, 2023. He was waived on August 28, 2023.

=== Birmingham Stallions ===
On January 19, 2024, Sokol signed with the Birmingham Stallions of the United Football League (UFL). He was released on March 10, 2024.
