= 2023 Merrimack Warriors football team =

Merrimack College in the 2023 NCAA Division I FCS football season

2023 Merrimack Warriors football
- Conference: Northeast Conference
- Record: 5–6 (4–3 NEC)
- Head coach: Dan Curran (11th season)
- Offensive coordinator: Aynsley Rosenbaum (1st season)
- Defensive coordinator: Mike Gennetti (19th season)
- Home stadium: Duane Stadium

2023 Northeast Conference football standings
	Conf.			Overall
Team	W		L	W		L
Duquesne $^	6	–	1	7	–	5
Saint Francis (PA)	4	–	3	4	–	6
Merrimack	4	–	3	5	–	6
Stonehill *	4	–	3	5	–	5
LIU	4	–	3	4	–	7
Wagner	3	–	4	4	–	7
Sacred Heart	2	–	5	2	–	9
Central Connecticut	1	–	6	3	–	8
$ – Conference champion; ^ – FCS playoff participant; Note: Stonehill ineligible for NEC title and FCS postseason play due to transition from NCAA Division II; Rankings from STATS Poll

The 2023 Merrimack Warriors football team represented Merrimack College as a member of the Northeast Conference (NEC) in the 2023 NCAA Division I FCS football season. The Warriors were led by 11th-year head coach Dan Curran and played home games at Duane Stadium in North Andover, Massachusetts. 2023 marked the first year that Merrimack was eligible for the postseason as a Division I program.

== Schedule ==
Date	Time	Opponent	Site	TV	Result	Attendance
September 2	2:00 p.m.	at No. 5 Holy Cross*	Fitton Field; Worcester, MA	ESPN+	L 20–42	13,117
September 9	4:00 p.m.	Lehigh*	Duane Stadium; North Andover, MA	NEC Front Row	L 12–14	1,562
September 16	6:00 p.m.	Virginia–Lynchburg*	Duane Stadium; North Andover, MA	NEC Front Row	W 44–0	3,274
September 23	4:00 p.m.	at Wagner	Wagner College Stadium; Staten Island, NY	NEC Front Row	L 27–30	1,362
September 30	1:00 p.m.	at Sacred Heart	Campus Field; Fairfield, CT	NEC Front Row	W 17–7	8,552
October 7	1:00 p.m.	Stonehill^{†}	Duane Stadium; North Andover, MA	ESPN+	W 45–34	13,647
October 21	1:00 p.m.	at LIU	Bethpage Federal Credit Union Stadium; Brookville, NY	NEC Front Row	W 39–0	783
October 28	1:00 p.m.	at Saint Francis (PA)	DeGol Field; Loretto, PA	NEC Front Row	L 21–28	1,264
November 4	3:30 p.m.	at UMass*	McGuirk Alumni Stadium; Amherst, MA	ESPN+	L 21–31	14,672
November 11	12:00 p.m.	Central Connecticut	Duane Stadium; North Andover, MA	NEC Front Row	W 35–24	1,879
November 18	12:00 p.m.	Duquesne	Duane Stadium; North Andover, MA	NEC Front Row	L 14–26	2,165
*Non-conference game; ^{†}Homecoming; Rankings from STATS Poll released prior to the game; All times are in Eastern time
