= 2023 Fordham Rams football team =

American college football season

2023 Fordham Rams football
- Conference: Patriot League
- Record: 6–5 (2–4 Patriot)
- Head coach: Joe Conlin (6th season)
- Offensive coordinator: Art Asselta (1st season)
- Defensive coordinator: Mark Powell (2nd season)
- Home stadium: Coffey Field

2023 Patriot League football standings
	Conf.			Overall
Team	W		L	W		L
No. 21 Lafayette +^	5	–	1	9	–	3
Holy Cross +	5	–	1	7	–	4
Colgate	4	–	2	6	–	5
Georgetown	3	–	3	5	–	6
Fordham	2	–	4	6	–	5
Lehigh	1	–	5	2	–	9
Bucknell	1	–	5	4	–	7
+ – Conference co-champions; ^ – FCS playoff participant; Rankings from STATS Poll

The 2023 Fordham Rams football team represented Fordham University as a member of the Patriot League during the 2023 NCAA Division I FCS football season. Led by sixth-year head coach Joe Conlin, the Rams played home games at Coffey Field in The Bronx.

== Schedule ==
Date	Time	Opponent	Site	TV	Result	Attendance
August 26	7:00 p.m.	at Albany*	Bob Ford Field; Albany, NY	FloSports	L 13–34	8,500
September 2	6:00 p.m.	Wagner*	Coffey Field; Bronx, NY	ESPN+	W 46–16	3,147
September 9	6:00 p.m.	at Buffalo*	University at Buffalo Stadium; Amherst, NY	ESPN+	W 40–37	15,854
September 23	1:00 p.m.	Stonehill*	Coffey Field; Bronx, NY	ESPN+	W 44–0	642
September 30	2:00 p.m.	at Georgetown	Cooper Field; Washington, DC	ESPN+	L 24–28	4,367
October 7	1:00 p.m.	Lehigh^{†}	Coffey Field; Bronx, NY	SNY/ESPN+	W 38–35	1,675
October 14	3:30 p.m.	at Stony Brook*	Kenneth P. LaValle Stadium; Stony Brook, NY	FloSports	W 26–7	4,165
October 28	1:00 p.m.	Holy Cross	Coffey Field; Bronx, NY	SNY/ESPN+	L 47–49	7,000
November 4	1:00 p.m.	Bucknell	Coffey Field; Bronx, NY	SNY/ESPN+	W 27–21	1,950
November 11	12:30 p.m.	at No. 25 Lafayette	Fisher Stadium; Easton, PA	ESPN+	L 16–24	4,256
November 18	1:00 p.m.	at Colgate	Andy Kerr Stadium; Hamilton, NY	ESPN+	L 14–21	1,723
*Non-conference game; ^{†}Homecoming; Rankings from STATS Poll released prior to the game; All times are in Eastern time

== Game summaries ==
=== at Buffalo ===
Buffalo (0–1) vs. Fordham (FCS) (1–1) – Game summary

Quarter	1	2	3	4	Total
Rams	3	17	6	14	40
Bulls	14	7	9	7	37

at University at Buffalo Stadium • Amherst, New York

- Date: September 9, 2023
- Game time: 6:00 p.m.
- Game weather: 69 °F (21 °C); Cloudy; Wind at NE5 MPH
- Game attendance: 15,854
- Referee: Rich Edwards
- TV announcers (ESPN+): Robert Lee (play-by-play) and Stan Lewter (analyst)

Game information

First quarter

- UB – (10:47) Mike Washington 1-yard run, Alex McNulty kick (Drive: 9 plays, 72 yards, 4:07; Buffalo 7–0)
- UB – (10:06) Marlyn Johnson 22-yard pass from Cole Snyder, Alex McNulty kick (Drive: 1 plays, 22 yards, 0:05; Buffalo 14–0)
- FOR – (3:40) Brandon Peskin 38-yard field goal (Drive: 13 plays, 55 yards, 6:26; Buffalo 14–3)

Second quarter

- UB – (14:16) Darrell Harding Jr. 15-yard pass from Cole Snyder, Alex McNulty kick (Drive: 7 plays, 68 yards, 4:18; Buffalo 21–3)
- FOR – (11:10) Mekai Felton 9-yard pass from C. J. Montes, Brandon Peskin kick (Drive: 7 plays, 89 yards, 3:01; Buffalo 21–10)
- FOR – (1:53) Mekai Felton 12-yard pass from C. J. Montes, Brandon Peskin kick (Drive: 13 plays, 97 yards, 5:32; Buffalo 21–17)
- FOR – (0:15) Brandon Peskin 44-yard field goal (Drive: 7 plays, 34 yards, 1:18; Buffalo 21–20)

Third quarter

- FOR – (7:33) Julius Loughridge 9-yard pass from C. J. Montes (blocked PAT) (Drive: 3 plays, 11 yards, 1:07; Fordham 26–21)
- UB – (7:33) Clevester Hines III 75-yard PAT return; Fordham 26–23
- UB – (3:13) Mike Washington 5-yard run, Alex McNulty kick (Drive: 10 plays, 75 yards, 4:20; Buffalo 30–26)

Fourth quarter

- FOR – (12:46) Garrett Cody 2-yard pass from C. J. Montes, Brandon Peskin kick (Drive: 11 plays, 86 yards, 5:23; Fordham 33–30)
- UB – (8:03) Marlyn Johnson 36-yard pass from Cole Snyder, Alex McNulty kick (Drive: 9 plays, 75 yards, 4:43; Buffalo 37–33)
- FOR – (2:32) M. J. Wright 15-yard pass from C. J. Montes, Brandon Peskin kick (Drive: 12 plays, 75 yards, 5:31; Fordham 40–37)

Statistics	FOR	UB
First downs	27	23
Plays–yards	79–459	60–362
Rushes–yards	43–150	30–97
Passing yards	309	265
Passing: comp–att–int	23–36–0	24–30–0
Time of possession	34:10	25:36

Team	Category	Player	Statistics
Fordham	Passing	C. J. Montes	23/36, 309 yards, 5 TD
Fordham	Rushing	Julius Loughridge	20 carries, 106 yards
Fordham	Receiving	MJ Wright	7 receptions, 159 yards, 1 TD
Buffalo	Passing	Cole Snyder	24/30, 265 yards, 3 TD
Buffalo	Rushing	Mike Washington	13 carries, 57 yards, 2 TD
Buffalo	Receiving	Marlyn Johnson	7 receptions, 105 yards, 2 TD
