= 2023 Colgate Raiders football team =

American college football season

2023 Colgate Raiders football
- Conference: Patriot League
- Record: 6–5 (4–2 Patriot)
- Head coach: Stan Dakosty (3rd season)
- Offensive coordinator: Brent Bassham (4th season)
- Defensive coordinator: Jordan Belfiori (2nd season)
- Home stadium: Crown Field at Andy Kerr Stadium

2023 Patriot League football standings
	Conf.			Overall
Team	W		L	W		L
No. 21 Lafayette +^	5	–	1	9	–	3
Holy Cross +	5	–	1	7	–	4
Colgate	4	–	2	6	–	5
Georgetown	3	–	3	5	–	6
Fordham	2	–	4	6	–	5
Lehigh	1	–	5	2	–	9
Bucknell	1	–	5	4	–	7
+ – Conference co-champions; ^ – FCS playoff participant; Rankings from STATS Poll

The 2023 Colgate Raiders football team represented Colgate University as a member of the Patriot League during the 2023 NCAA Division I FCS football season. The Raiders were led by third-year head coach Stan Dakosty, and played their home games at Crown Field at Andy Kerr Stadium in Hamilton, New York

== Schedule ==
Date	Time	Opponent	Site	TV	Result	Attendance
September 2	4:00 p.m.	at Syracuse*	JMA Wireless Dome; Syracuse, NY (rivalry)	ACCNX/ESPN+	L 0–65	32,465
September 9	6:00 p.m.	at Villanova*	Villanova Stadium; Villanova, PA	FloSports	L 19–42	5,101
September 16	1:00 p.m.	Penn*	Andy Kerr Stadium; Hamilton, NY	ESPN+	L 6–20	3,627
September 23	2:00 p.m.	at No. 6 Holy Cross	Fitton Field; Worcester, MA	ESPN+	L 7–47	12,578
September 30	2:00 p.m.	at Cornell*	Schoellkopf Field; Ithaca, NY (rivalry)	ESPN+	W 35–25	12,525
October 14	1:00 p.m.	Dartmouth*^{†}	Andy Kerr Stadium; Hamilton, NY	ESPN+	W 27–24 ^{OT}	2,732
October 21	3:00 p.m.	at Georgetown	Cooper Field; Washington, DC	ESPN+	W 28–18	3,137
October 28	1:00 p.m.	Bucknell	Andy Kerr Stadium; Hamilton, NY	ESPN+	L 34–49	4,276
November 4	12:30 p.m.	at No. 20 Lafayette	Fisher Stadium; Easton, PA	ESPN+	W 37–34 ^{OT}	4,418
November 11	1:00 p.m.	Lehigh	Andy Kerr Stadium; Hamilton, NY	ESPN+	W 37–21	2,031
November 18	1:00 p.m.	Fordham	Andy Kerr Stadium; Hamilton, NY	ESPN+	W 21–14	1,723
*Non-conference game; ^{†}Homecoming; Rankings from STATS Poll released prior to the game; All times are in Eastern time

== Game summaries ==
=== at Syracuse ===
Game One – Colgate Raiders (0–0) at Syracuse Orange (0–0)

Quarter	1	2	3	4	Total
Raiders	0	0	0	0	0
Orange	23	14	28	0	65

at JMA Wireless Dome • Syracuse, NY

- Date: Saturday, September 2, 2023
- Game time: 4:00 p.m. EDT
- Game weather: Indoors
- Game attendance: 32,465
- Referee: Adam Savoie
- TV: ACCNX

Game information

First quarter

- (7:18) SU – LeQuint Allen 3-yard run, Brady Denaburg kick (Drive: 4 plays, 38 yards, 01:13; Syracuse 7–0)
- (5:00) SU – Damien Alford 13-yard pass from Garrett Shrader, Brady Denaburg kick (Drive: 3 plays, 42 yards, 00:42; Syracuse 14–0)
- (3:41) SU – Jeremiah Wilson 34-yard interception return (No drive; Syracuse 20–0)
- (0:54) SU – Brady Denaburg 25-yard field goal (7 plays, 35 yards, 02:40; Syracuse 23–0)

Second quarter

- (11:36) SU – Isaiah Jones 44-yard pass from Garrett Shrader, Brady Denaburg kick (Drive: 8 plays, 85 yards, 02:42; Syracuse 30–0)
- (7:13) SU – Oronde Gadsden II 14-yard pass from Garrett Shrader, Brady Denaburg kick (Drive: 2 plays, 20 yards, 00:26; Syracuse 37–0)

Third quarter

- (11:55) SU – Umari Hatcher 4-yard pass from Garrett Shrader, Brady Denaburg kick (Drive: 8 plays, 92 yards, 03:04; Syracuse 44–0)
- (7:48) SU – Isaiah Jones 5-yard pass from Carlos Del Rio-Wilson, Brady Denaburg kick (Drive: 7 plays, 77 yards, 02:07; Syracuse 51–0)
- (7:13) SU – Kendall Long 25-yard pass from Carlos Del Rio-Wilson, Brady Denaburg kick (Drive: 1 play, 25 yards, 00:08; Syracuse 58–0)
- (1:34) SU – Darrell Gill Jr. 18-yard pass from Carlos Del Rio-Wilson, Brady Denaburg kick (Drive: 10 plays, 60 yards, 03:27; Syracuse 65–0)

Statistics	COL	SU
First downs	7	34
Plays–yards	58–106	89–677
Rushes–yards	38–54	52–271
Passing yards	52	406
Passing: comp–att–int	11–20–2	28–37–1
Turnovers		
Time of possession	29:20	30:40

Team	Category	Player	Statistics
Colgate	Passing	Michael Brescia	7/14, 29 yards, 2 INT
Colgate	Rushing	Jaedon Henry	10 carries, 34 yards
Colgate	Receiving	Winston Moore	3 receptions, 19 yards
Syracuse	Passing	Garrett Shrader	18/24, 257 yards, 4 TD, 1 INT
Syracuse	Rushing	LeQuint Allen	16 carries, 107 yards, 1 TD
Syracuse	Receiving	Umari Hatcher	4 receptions, 105 yards, 1 TD
