= Kevin Cahill (American football) =

American football coach (born 1978)

Current position
- Title: Head coach
- Team: Yale
- Conference: Ivy League
- Record: 6–4

Biographical details
- Born: December 2, 1978 (age 47); New York Mills, New York, U.S.

Playing career
- 1997–2000: Springfield
- Position: Quarterback

Coaching career (HC unless noted)
- 2001: Maine Maritime (QB/FB/WR)
- 2002–2003: Springfield (QB/GA)
- 2004–2005: Tennessee–Martin (WR)
- 2006–2007: Murray State (WR)
- 2008: Maine (RB)
- 2009–2011: Maine (ST/WR)
- 2012–2013: Yale (ST/WR)
- 2014–2017: Yale (AHC/QB)
- 2018–2022: Yale (AHC/OC/QB)
- 2023–2025: Lehigh
- 2026–present: Yale

Head coaching record
- Overall: 29–18
- Tournaments: 1–2 (NCAA D-I playoffs)

Accomplishments and honors

Championships
- 2 Patriot (2024, 2025)

Awards
- Eddie Robinson Award (2025)

Kevin Cahill (born December 2, 1978) is an American college football coach. He is the head coach at Yale University, a position he has held since February 2026. Prior to this role, he was the head coach at Lehigh University. Cahill played college football as a quarterback at Springfield College in Springfield, Massachusetts. He has served as an assistant coach for Maine Maritime, Springfield, UT Martin, Murray State, Maine, and Yale.

== Playing career ==
Cahill played college football for Springfield. He was a three-year starter at quarterback and led Springfield to two NCAA playoff appearances and earned two ECAC Division III New England Player of the Year awards. He holds the programs record for most passing touchdowns in a game at 4 and finished his career with 3,029 rushing yards, 44 rushing touchdowns, and 4,842 total yards of offense. He also was a three year starting pitcher during his time at Springfield and Earned NEWMAC All-Conference honors. Cahill graduated in 2001 and was inducted into Springfield's Athletic hall of fame in 2013.

== Coaching career ==
=== Early years ===
Cahill began his coaching career with Maine Maritime shortly after his 2001 as the team's quarterbacks, fullbacks, and wide receivers coach. The following season, Cahill returned to his alma mater as the team's quarterbacks coach and as a graduate assistant. In 2004 and 2006 he was hired by UT Martin and Murray State respectively to be each school's wide receivers coach. In 2008, Cahill joined Maine as their running backs coach. In 2009 he was promoted to special teams coordinator and returned to coaching the wide receivers.

=== Yale (first stint) ===
In 2012, Cahill was hired by Yale to be the school's special teams coordinator and wide receivers coach. After two seasons he was promoted to assistant head coach and quarterbacks coach. In 2018 he added the role of offensive coordinator.

=== Lehigh ===
On December 19, 2022, Cahill was hired by Lehigh to be the school's 30th head coach.

=== Yale (second stint) ===
On February 23, 2026, Cahill was hired as the head coach for Yale.

== Head coaching record ==
Year	Team	Overall	Conference	Standing	Bowl/playoffs	STATS^{#}	Coaches'^{°}
Lehigh Mountain Hawks (Patriot League) (2023–2025)
2023	Lehigh	2–9	1–5	T–7th			
2024	Lehigh	9–4	5–1	T–1st	L NCAA Division I Second Round	20	21
2025	Lehigh	12–1	7–0	1st	L NCAA Division I Second Round	10	9
Lehigh:		23–14	13–6				
Yale Bulldogs (Ivy League) (2026–present)
2026	Yale	6–4	4–3	T–2nd			
Yale:		6–4	4–3				
Total:		29–18					
