= 2020 Bryant Bulldogs football team =

American college football season

2020 Bryant Bulldogs football
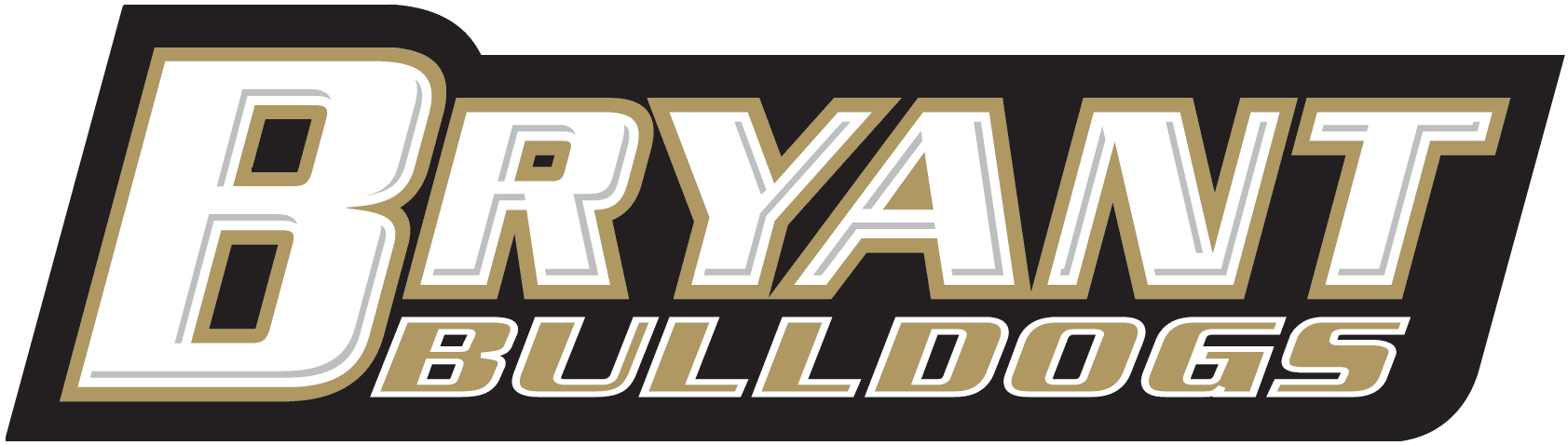
- Conference: Northeast Conference
- Record: 2–2 (2–2 NEC)
- Head coach: Chris Merritt (2nd season)
- Defensive coordinator: Anthony Barese (1st season)
- Home stadium: Beirne Stadium

2020 Northeast Conference football standings
	Conf.			Overall
Team	W		L	W		L
Duquesne y	4	–	0	4	–	1
Sacred Heart y$^	2	–	1	3	–	2
LIU	2	–	2	2	–	2
Bryant	2	–	2	2	–	2
Wagner	0	–	2	0	–	2
Merrimack*	0	–	3	0	–	3
Championship: Sacred Heart 34, Duquesne 27 (OT)
$ – Conference champion; y – Championship game participant; ^ – FCS playoff participant; Note: Due to COVID-19, the Northeast suspended the 2020 football season. * – Merrimack ineligible for NEC title and FCS postseason play due to transition to NCAA Division I Central Connecticut and Saint Francis (PA) opted out of the spring season.; Rankings from STATS Poll

The 2020 Bryant Bulldogs football team represented Bryant University in the 2020–21 NCAA Division I FCS football season. Led by second-year head coach Chris Merritt, the Bulldogs compiled an overall record of 2–2 with an identical mark in conference play, tying for third place in the NEC. Bryant played home games at Beirne Stadium in Smithfield, Rhode Island.

== Schedule ==
Bryant had games scheduled against Fordham (September 5), Rhode Island (September 12), Brown (September 19), and Robert Morris (November 7), which were later canceled before the start of the 2020 season. Merrimack was added as a replacement for the canceled Robert Morris game on July 15.

Date	Time	Opponent	Site	TV	Result	Attendance
March 7	1:00 p.m.	at LIU	Bethpage Federal Credit Union Stadium; Brookville, NY	NEC Front Row	L 19–24	
March 14	1:00 p.m.	at Merrimack	Duane Stadium; North Andover, MA	NEC Front Row	W 14–7	
March 21	1:00 p.m.	Wagner	Beirne Stadium; Smithfield, RI	NEC Front Row	W 27–7	
March 28	12:00 p.m.	Duquesne	Beirne Stadium; Smithfield, RI	ESPN3	L 10–20	
Rankings from STATS Poll released prior to the game; All times are in Eastern time
