= 2023 Central Connecticut Blue Devils football team =

American college football season

2023 Central Connecticut Blue Devils football
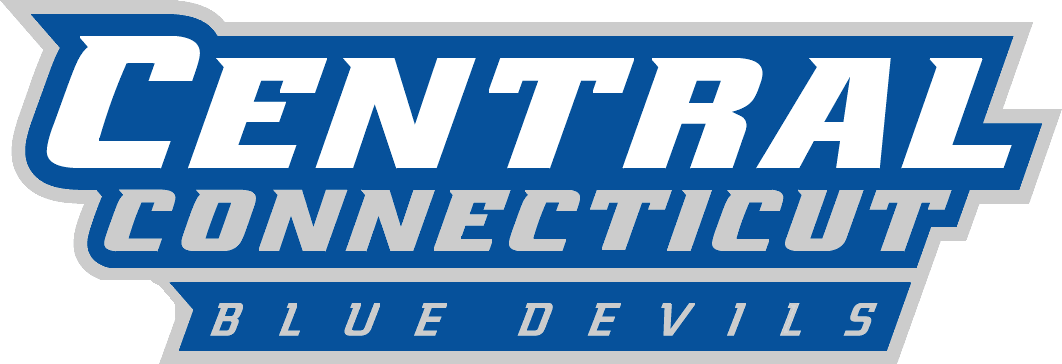
- Conference: Northeast Conference
- Record: 3–8 (1–6 NEC)
- Head coach: Adam Lechtenberg (1st season)
- Offensive coordinator: Caleb Gelsomino (1st season)
- Defensive coordinator: Ron DiGravio (5th season)
- Home stadium: Arute Field

2023 Northeast Conference football standings
	Conf.			Overall
Team	W		L	W		L
Duquesne $^	6	–	1	7	–	5
Saint Francis (PA)	4	–	3	4	–	6
Merrimack	4	–	3	5	–	6
Stonehill *	4	–	3	5	–	5
LIU	4	–	3	4	–	7
Wagner	3	–	4	4	–	7
Sacred Heart	2	–	5	2	–	9
Central Connecticut	1	–	6	3	–	8
$ – Conference champion; ^ – FCS playoff participant; Note: Stonehill ineligible for NEC title and FCS postseason play due to transition from NCAA Division II; Rankings from STATS Poll

The 2023 Central Connecticut Blue Devils football team represented Central Connecticut State University as a member of the Northeast Conference (NEC) during the 2023 NCAA Division I FCS football season. The Blue Devils were led by first-year head coach Adam Lechtenberg and played home games at Arute Field in New Britain, Connecticut.

== Schedule ==
Date	Time	Opponent	Site	TV	Result	Attendance
September 2	6:00 p.m.	American International*	Arute Field; New Britain, CT	NEC Front Row	W 44–0	5,095
September 9	12:00 p.m.	Stonehill	Arute Field; New Britain, CT	NEC Front Row	L 30–33	0
September 16	12:00 p.m.	at Kent State*	Dix Stadium; Kent, OH	ESPN+	L 10–38	10,731
September 30	12:00 p.m.	at Brown*	Brown Stadium; Providence, RI	ESPN+	L 20–42	1,426
October 7	1:00 p.m.	Delaware State^{†}	Arute Field; New Britain, CT	NEC Front Row	W 51–44	3,872
October 14	12:00 p.m.	at Duquesne	Rooney Field; Pittsburgh, PA	NEC Front Row	L 20–44	908
October 21	12:00 p.m.	at Wagner	Wagner College Stadium; Staten Island, NY	NEC Front Row	W 17–3	1,482
October 26	7:00 p.m.	LIU	Arute Field; New Britain, CT	CBSSN	L 23–24	3,104
November 4	12:00 p.m.	at Sacred Heart	Campus Field; Fairfield, CT	NEC Front Row	L 24–31	5,547
November 11	12:00 p.m.	at Merrimack	Duane Stadium; North Andover, MA	NEC Front Row	L 24–35	1,879
November 18	12:00 p.m.	Saint Francis	Arute Field; New Britain, CT	NEC Front Row	L 14–49	2,549
*Non-conference game; ^{†}Homecoming; All times are in Eastern time
