= 2023 LIU Sharks football team =

Long Island University's football team in 2023

2023 LIU Sharks football
- Conference: Northeast Conference
- Record: 4–7 (4–3 NEC)
- Head coach: Ron Cooper (2nd season)
- Co-offensive coordinators: John Roberts (2nd season); Kort Shankweiler (2nd season)
- Co-defensive coordinators: Kap Dede (1st season); Eric Mathies (1st season)
- Home stadium: Bethpage Federal Credit Union Stadium

2023 Northeast Conference football standings
	Conf.			Overall
Team	W		L	W		L
Duquesne $^	6	–	1	7	–	5
Saint Francis (PA)	4	–	3	4	–	6
Merrimack	4	–	3	5	–	6
Stonehill *	4	–	3	5	–	5
LIU	4	–	3	4	–	7
Wagner	3	–	4	4	–	7
Sacred Heart	2	–	5	2	–	9
Central Connecticut	1	–	6	3	–	8
$ – Conference champion; ^ – FCS playoff participant; Note: Stonehill ineligible for NEC title and FCS postseason play due to transition from NCAA Division II; Rankings from STATS Poll

The 2023 LIU Sharks football team represented both the LIU Post and LIU Brooklyn campuses of Long Island University as a member of the Northeast Conference (NEC) during the 2023 NCAA Division I FCS football season. The Sharks, were led by second-year head coach Ron Cooper and played home games at Bethpage Federal Credit Union Stadium in Brookville, New York.

== Schedule ==
Date	Time	Opponent	Site	TV	Result	Attendance
September 2	12:00 p.m.	at Ohio*	Peden Stadium; Athens, OH	ESPN+	L 10–27	18,453
September 9	6:00 p.m.	at Bryant*	Beirne Stadium; Smithfield, RI	ESPN+	L 10–21	
September 16	12:00 p.m.	at Baylor*	McLane Stadium; Waco, TX	ESPN+	L 7–30	43,732
September 30	12:00 p.m.	Duquesne	Bethpage Federal Credit Union Stadium; Brookville, NY	NEC Front Row	L 28–31	1,092
October 7	12:00 p.m.	Sacred Heart^{†}	Bethpage Federal Credit Union Stadium; Brookville, NY	NEC Front Row	W 23–13	2,339
October 14	1:00 p.m.	at Maine*	Alfond Stadium; Orono, ME	FloSports	L 13–24	8,588
October 21	12:00 p.m.	Merrimack	Bethpage Federal Credit Union Stadium; Brookville, NY	NEC Front Row	L 0–39	783
October 26	7:00 p.m.	at Central Connecticut	Arute Field; New Britain, CT	CBSSN	W 24–23	3,104
November 4	12:00 p.m.	at Saint Francis (PA)	DeGol Field; Loretto, PA	NEC Front Row	W 29–28	1,274
November 11	12:00 p.m.	Wagner	Bethpage Federal Credit Union Stadium; Brookville, NY	NEC Front Row	W 49–14	2,045
November 18	1:00 p.m.	at Stonehill	W.B. Mason Stadium; Easton, MA	NEC Front Row	L 23–40	
*Non-conference game; ^{†}Homecoming; All times are in Eastern time

== Game summaries ==
=== at Ohio ===
LIU Sharks (–) vs. Ohio Bobcats (–)

Quarter	1	2	3	4	Total
LIU	0	3	0	7	10
Ohio	3	14	10	0	27

at Peden Stadium • Athens, OH

- Date: Saturday, September 2, 2023
- Game time: 12:00 p.m. EDT
- Game weather: Temperature:83 °F (28 °C)
- Referee: Rich Edwards
- TV announcers (ESPN+): Michael Reghi, Jerod Cherry

Game information

First Quarter

- (02:44) OHIO - Gianni Spetic 24 yard FG 10 plays, 73 yards, TOP 05:13 (OHIO 3–0)

Second Quarter

- (10:30) OHIO - Tyler Walton 3 Yd pass from CJ Harris (Gianni Spetic Kick) 10 plays, 57 yards, TOP 6:19 (OHIO 10–0)
- (04:21) OHIO - Bryce Butler 9 Yd pass from Parker Navarro (Gianni Spetic Kick) 7 plays, 32 yards, TOP 3:55 (OHIO 17–0)
- (00:00) LIU - Michael Coney 41 Yd Field Goal 3 plays, 24 yards, TOP 00:20 (OHIO 17–3)

Third Quarter

- (11:50) OHIO - Mason Williams 32 Yd pass from Parker Navarro (Gianni Spetic Kick) 6 plays, 75 yards, TOP 3:10 (OHIO 24–3)
- (04:13) OHIO - Gianni Spetic 25 yard FG 4 plays, 3 yards, TOP 01:56 (OHIO 27–3)

Fourth Quarter

- (06:21) LIU - Davon Wells 15 Yd pass from Luca Stanzani (Michael Coney Kick) 4 plays, 35 yards, TOP 1:54 (OHIO 27–10)

Statistics	LIU	Ohio
First downs	13	18
Total yards	206	303
Rushes/yards	22/34	45/199
Passing yards	172	104
Passing: Comp–Att–Int	21–33	12–15
Time of possession	26:51	33:09

Team	Category	Player	Statistics
LIU	Passing	Luca Stanzani	21/33, 173 yards, 1 TD, 2 INT
LIU	Rushing	Pat Bowen	5 rushes, 16 yards
LIU	Receiving	Quincy McDuffie	3 receptions, 43 yards
Ohio	Passing	Parker Navarro	5/7, 60 yards, 2 TD, 1 INT
Ohio	Rushing	Sieh Bangura	19 rushes, 107 yards
Ohio	Receiving	Tyler Walton	4 rushes, 36 yards, 1 TD

=== at Baylor ===
LIU Sharks (0–2) vs. Baylor Bears (0–2)

Quarter	1	2	3	4	Total
LIU	0	7	0	0	7
Baylor	7	9	7	7	30

at McLane Stadium • Waco, TX

- Date: Saturday, September 16, 2023
- Game time: 11:00 a.m. CDT
- Game weather: rain • Temperature: 76°F
- Game attendance: 43,732
- Referee: Nate Black
- TV: ESPN+

Scoring summary

Quarter	Time	Drive			Team	Scoring information	Score	
Quarter	Time	Plays	Yards	TOP	Team	Scoring information	LIU	Baylor
1st	03:44	13	92	05:52	Baylor	Richard Reese 13-yard touchdown run, Isaiah Hankins kick good	0	7
2nd	08:27	16	82	08:32	Baylor	Dawson Pendergrass 1-yard touchdown run, Isaiah Hankins kick good	0	14
2nd	06:55				Baylor	Jake Timm wild snap into endzone for safety	0	16
2nd	00:40	4	59	01:06	LIU	Chris Howell 10-yard touchdown run, Michael Coney kick good	7	16
3rd	06:51	13	76	06:27	Baylor	Richard Reese 13-yard touchdown run, Isaiah Hankins kick good	7	23
4th	05:45	10	57	04:58	Baylor	Drake Dabney 3-yard touchdown reception from Sawyer Robertson, Isaiah Hankins kick good	7	30
"TOP" = time of possession. For other American football terms, see Glossary of American football.							7	30

Statistics	LIU	Baylor
First downs	10	26
Plays–yards	43–143	75–391
Rushes–yards	29–143	48–270
Passing yards	40	121
Passing: comp–att–int	6–14–1	13–27–0
Turnovers		
Time of possession	23:36	36:24

Team	Category	Player	Statistics
LIU	Passing	Chris Howell	4–10, 41 yards, 1 INT
LIU	Rushing	Jaden Dawkins	1 carry, 42 yards
LIU	Receiving	Aviyon Smith Mack	1 reception, 35 yards
Baylor	Passing	Sawyer Robertson	10–22, 113 yards, 1 TD
Baylor	Rushing	Dawson Pendergrass	21 carries, 111 yards, 1 TD
Baylor	Receiving	Ketron Jackson, Jr.	2 receptions, 29 yards
