= 2023 Bucknell Bison football team =

American college football season

2023 Bucknell Bison football
- Conference: Patriot League
- Record: 4–7 (1–5 Patriot)
- Head coach: Dave Cecchini (5th season)
- Offensive coordinator: Jason Miran (5th season)
- Defensive coordinator: Chris Bowers (2nd season)
- Home stadium: Christy Mathewson–Memorial Stadium

2023 Patriot League football standings
	Conf.			Overall
Team	W		L	W		L
No. 21 Lafayette +^	5	–	1	9	–	3
Holy Cross +	5	–	1	7	–	4
Colgate	4	–	2	6	–	5
Georgetown	3	–	3	5	–	6
Fordham	2	–	4	6	–	5
Lehigh	1	–	5	2	–	9
Bucknell	1	–	5	4	–	7
+ – Conference co-champions; ^ – FCS playoff participant; Rankings from STATS Poll

The 2023 Bucknell Bison football team represented Bucknell University as a member of the Patriot League during the 2023 NCAA Division I FCS football season. The Bison were led by fifth-year head coach Dave Cecchini and played their home games at Christy Mathewson–Memorial Stadium in Lewisburg, Pennsylvania.

== Schedule ==
Date	Time	Opponent	Site	TV	Result	Attendance
September 2	6:00 p.m.	at James Madison*	Bridgeforth Stadium; Harrisonburg, VA	ESPN+	L 3–38	23,756
September 9	6:00 p.m.	VMI*	Christy Mathewson-Memorial Stadium; Lewisburg, PA	ESPN+	W 21–13	1,465
September 23	3:30 p.m.	Penn*^{†}	Christy Mathewson-Memorial Stadium; Lewisburg, Pennsylvania	ESPN+	L 21–37	2,046
September 30	3:30 p.m.	at Lafayette	Fisher Stadium; Easton, PA	ESPN+	L 22–56	4,283
October 7	1:00 p.m.	No. 12 Holy Cross	Christy Mathewson-Memorial Stadium; Lewisburg, PA	ESPN+	L 27–55	925
October 14	1:00 p.m.	at Cornell*	Schoellkopf Field; Ithaca, NY	ESPN+	W 21–13	2,142
October 21	1:00 p.m.	Lehigh	Christy Mathewson-Memorial Stadium; Lewisburg, PA	ESPN+	L 18–27	966
October 28	1:00 p.m.	at Colgate	Andy Kerr Stadium; Hamilton, NY	ESPN+	W 49–34	4,276
November 4	1:00 p.m.	at Fordham	Coffey Field; Bronx, NY	ESPN+	L 21–27	1,950
November 11	1:00 p.m.	Georgetown	Christy Mathewson-Memorial Stadium; Lewisburg, PA	ESPN+	L 47–50 ^{OT}	1,004
November 18	12:00 p.m.	at Marist*	Leonidoff Field; Poughkeepsie, NY	ESPN+	W 38–21	1,552
*Non-conference game; ^{†}Homecoming; Rankings from STATS Poll released prior to the game; All times are in Eastern time
