= 2020 Merrimack Warriors football team =

American college football season

2020 Merrimack Warriors football
- Conference: Northeast Conference
- Record: 0–3 (0–3 NEC)
- Head coach: Dan Curran (8th season)
- Defensive coordinator: Mike Gennetti (16th season)
- Home stadium: Duane Stadium

2020 Northeast Conference football standings
	Conf.			Overall
Team	W		L	W		L
Duquesne y	4	–	0	4	–	1
Sacred Heart y$^	2	–	1	3	–	2
LIU	2	–	2	2	–	2
Bryant	2	–	2	2	–	2
Wagner	0	–	2	0	–	2
Merrimack*	0	–	3	0	–	3
Championship: Sacred Heart 34, Duquesne 27 (OT)
$ – Conference champion; y – Championship game participant; ^ – FCS playoff participant; Note: Due to COVID-19, the Northeast suspended the 2020 football season. * – Merrimack ineligible for NEC title and FCS postseason play due to transition to NCAA Division I Central Connecticut and Saint Francis (PA) opted out of the spring season.; Rankings from STATS Poll

The 2020 Merrimack Warriors football team represented Merrimack College in the 2020–21 NCAA Division I FCS football season. They were led by eighth-year head coach Dan Curran and played their home games at Duane Stadium. They competed as members of the Northeast Conference.

== Schedule ==
Merrimack's schedule was released on April 9, 2020. The Warriors had games scheduled against Holy Cross (September 5), New Hampshire (October 3), Presbyterian (November 14), and James Madison (November 21), but these games were canceled before the season started due to the COVID-19 pandemic.

Date	Time	Opponent	Site	TV	Result	Attendance
March 14	1:00 p.m.	Bryant	Duane Stadium; North Andover, MA		L 7–14	
March 21		at Sacred Heart	Campus Field; Fairfield, CT		L 9–26	
March 28	12:00 p.m.	at LIU	Bethpage Federal Credit Union Stadium; Brookville, NY		L 20–31	
April 2	1:30 p.m.	Wagner	Duane Stadium; North Andover, MA		Canceled	
All times are in Eastern time
