= 2023 Saint Francis Red Flash football team =

American college football season

2023 Saint Francis Red Flash football
- Conference: Northeast Conference
- Record: 4–6 (4–3 NEC)
- Head coach: Chris Villarrial (13th season)
- Offensive coordinator: Marco Pecora (4th season)
- Defensive coordinator: Scott Lewis (3rd season)
- Home stadium: DeGol Field

2023 Northeast Conference football standings
| | Conf. | | | Overall |
| Team | W | | L | W | | L |
|---|---|---|---|---|---|---|
| Duquesne $^ | 6 | – | 1 | 7 | – | 5 |
| Saint Francis (PA) | 4 | – | 3 | 4 | – | 6 |
| Merrimack | 4 | – | 3 | 5 | – | 6 |
| Stonehill * | 4 | – | 3 | 5 | – | 5 |
| LIU | 4 | – | 3 | 4 | – | 7 |
| Wagner | 3 | – | 4 | 4 | – | 7 |
| Sacred Heart | 2 | – | 5 | 2 | – | 9 |
| Central Connecticut | 1 | – | 6 | 3 | – | 8 |
$ – Conference champion; ^ – FCS playoff participant; Note: Stonehill ineligible for NEC title and FCS postseason play due to transition from NCAA Division II; Rankings from STATS Poll

The 2023 Saint Francis Red Flash football team represented Saint Francis University as a member of the Northeast Conference (NEC) during the 2023 NCAA Division I FCS football season. The Red Flash, were led by 13th-year head coach Chris Villarrial, and played their home games at DeGol Field.

== Schedule ==
| Date | Time | Opponent | Site | TV | Result | Attendance |
|---|---|---|---|---|---|---|
| August 31 | 7:00 p.m. | at Western Michigan* | Waldo Stadium; Kalamazoo, MI | ESPN+ | L 17–35 | 19,432 |
| September 9 | 6:00 p.m. | at Robert Morris* | Joe Walton Stadium; Moon Township, PA | ESPN+ | L 21–31 | 3,412 |
| September 16 | 6:00 p.m. | at No. 22 Delaware* | Delaware Stadium; Newark, DE | FloSports | L 14–42 | 16,332 |
| September 23 | 12:00 p.m. | Sacred Heart | DeGol Field; Loretto, PA | NEC Front Row | L 34–37 | 1,167 |
| September 30 | 1:00 p.m. | at Stonehill | W.B. Mason Stadium; Easton, MA | NEC Front Row | W 15–10 | 2,400 |
| October 12 | 7:00 p.m. | Wagner | DeGol Field; Loretto, PA | CBSSN | W 31–7 | 2,878 |
| October 21 | 1:00 p.m. | at Duquesne | Rooney Field; Pittsburgh, PA | NEC Front Row | L 35–38 | 3,052 |
| October 28 | 1:00 p.m. | Merrimack^{†} | DeGol Field; Loretto, PA | NEC Front Row | W 28–21 | 1,264 |
| November 4 | 12:00 p.m. | LIU | DeGol Field; Loretto, PA | NEC Front Row | L 28–29 | 1,274 |
| November 18 | 12:00 p.m. | at Central Connecticut | Arute Field; New Britain, CT | NEC Front Row | W 49–14 | 2,549 |
*Non-conference game; ^{†}Homecoming; Rankings from STATS Poll released prior to the game; All times are in Eastern time
