= 2020 Wagner Seahawks football team =

American college football season

2020 Wagner Seahawks football
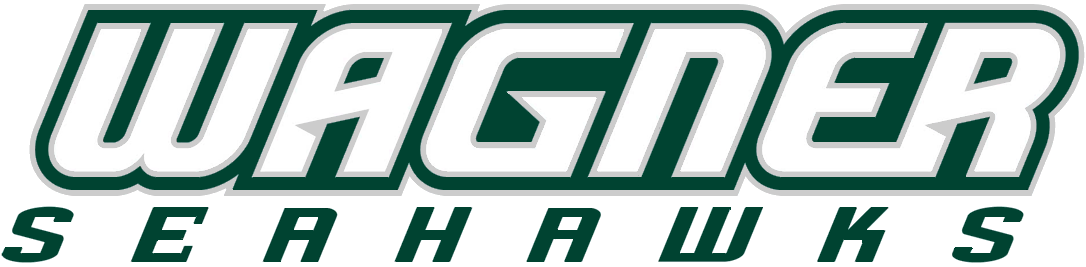
- Conference: Northeast Conference
- Record: 0–2 (0–2 NEC)
- Head coach: Tom Masella (1st season)
- Offensive coordinator: Chris Nugai (1st season)
- Defensive coordinator: Del Smith (2nd season)
- Home stadium: Wagner College Stadium

2020 Northeast Conference football standings
	Conf.			Overall
Team	W		L	W		L
Duquesne y	4	–	0	4	–	1
Sacred Heart y$^	2	–	1	3	–	2
LIU	2	–	2	2	–	2
Bryant	2	–	2	2	–	2
Wagner	0	–	2	0	–	2
Merrimack*	0	–	3	0	–	3
Championship: Sacred Heart 34, Duquesne 27 (OT)
$ – Conference champion; y – Championship game participant; ^ – FCS playoff participant; Note: Due to COVID-19, the Northeast suspended the 2020 football season. * – Merrimack ineligible for NEC title and FCS postseason play due to transition to NCAA Division I Central Connecticut and Saint Francis (PA) opted out of the spring season.; Rankings from STATS Poll

The 2020 Wagner Seahawks football team represented Wagner College in the 2020–21 NCAA Division I FCS football season as a member of the Northeast Conference (NEC). They were led by first-year head coach Tom Masella and played their home games at Wagner College Stadium.

== Schedule ==
Wagner had games scheduled against Monmouth, Fordham and Miami, but these games were canceled before the season due to the COVID-19 pandemic.

Date	Time	Opponent	Site	TV	Result	Attendance
March 14	12:00 p.m.	Duquesne	Wagner College Stadium; Staten Island, NY		L 0–17	
March 21	1:00 p.m.	at Bryant	Beirne Stadium; Smithfield, RI		L 7–27	
March 28	1:00 p.m.	Sacred Heart	Wagner College Stadium; Staten Island, NY		Canceled	
April 2	1:30 p.m.	at Merrimack^{†}	Duane Stadium; North Andover, MA		Canceled	
^{†}Homecoming; All times are in Eastern time
