= 2023 Stonehill Skyhawks football team =

American college football season

2023 Stonehill Skyhawks football
- Conference: Northeast Conference
- Record: 5–5 (4–3 NEC)
- Head coach: Eli Gardner (7th season)
- Offensive coordinator: Tyler Moody (7th season)
- Defensive coordinator: Kyle Jones (3rd season)
- Home stadium: W.B. Mason Stadium

2023 Northeast Conference football standings
	Conf.			Overall
Team	W		L	W		L
Duquesne $^	6	–	1	7	–	5
Saint Francis (PA)	4	–	3	4	–	6
Merrimack	4	–	3	5	–	6
Stonehill *	4	–	3	5	–	5
LIU	4	–	3	4	–	7
Wagner	3	–	4	4	–	7
Sacred Heart	2	–	5	2	–	9
Central Connecticut	1	–	6	3	–	8
$ – Conference champion; ^ – FCS playoff participant; Note: Stonehill ineligible for NEC title and FCS postseason play due to transition from NCAA Division II; Rankings from STATS Poll

The 2023 Stonehill Skyhawks football team represented Stonehill College as a second-year member of the Northeast Conference (NEC) during the 2023 NCAA Division I FCS football season. The Skyhawks, led by seventh-year head coach Eli Gardner, and played their home games at W.B. Mason Stadium. Stonehill is ineligible for the NEC title and FCS postseason play due to transition from NCAA Division II.

== Schedule ==
Date	Time	Opponent	Site	TV	Result	Attendance
September 2	1:00 p.m.	No. 11 New Hampshire*	W.B. Mason Stadium; Easton, MA	NEC Front Row	L 17–51	2,400
September 9	12:00 p.m.	at Central Connecticut	Arute Field; New Britain, CT	NEC Front Row	W 33–30	N/A
September 16	12:30 p.m.	at Georgetown*	Cooper Field; Washington, DC	ESPN+	W 23–20	2,463
September 23	1:00 p.m.	at Fordham*	Coffey Field; Bronx, NY	ESPN+	L 0–44	642
September 30	1:00 p.m.	Saint Francis	W.B. Mason Stadium; Easton, MA	NEC Front Row	L 10–15	2,400
October 7	1:00 p.m.	at Merrimack	Duane Stadium; North Andover, MA	ESPN+	L 34–45	13,647
October 21	1:00 p.m.	Sacred Heart^{†}	W.B. Mason Stadium; Easton, MA	NEC Front Row	W 22–19 ^{2OT}	2,422
October 28	12:00 p.m.	at Wagner	Wagner College Stadium; Staten Island, NY	NEC Front Row	L 17–28	N/A
November 11	12:00 p.m.	at Duquesne	Rooney Field; Pittsburgh, PA	ESPN+	W 33–28	1,656
November 18	1:00 p.m.	LIU	W.B. Mason Stadium; Easton, MA	NEC Front Row	W 40–23	
*Non-conference game; ^{†}Homecoming; Rankings from STATS Poll released prior to the game; All times are in Eastern time
