= 2023 Holy Cross Crusaders football team =

American college football season

2023 Holy Cross Crusaders football

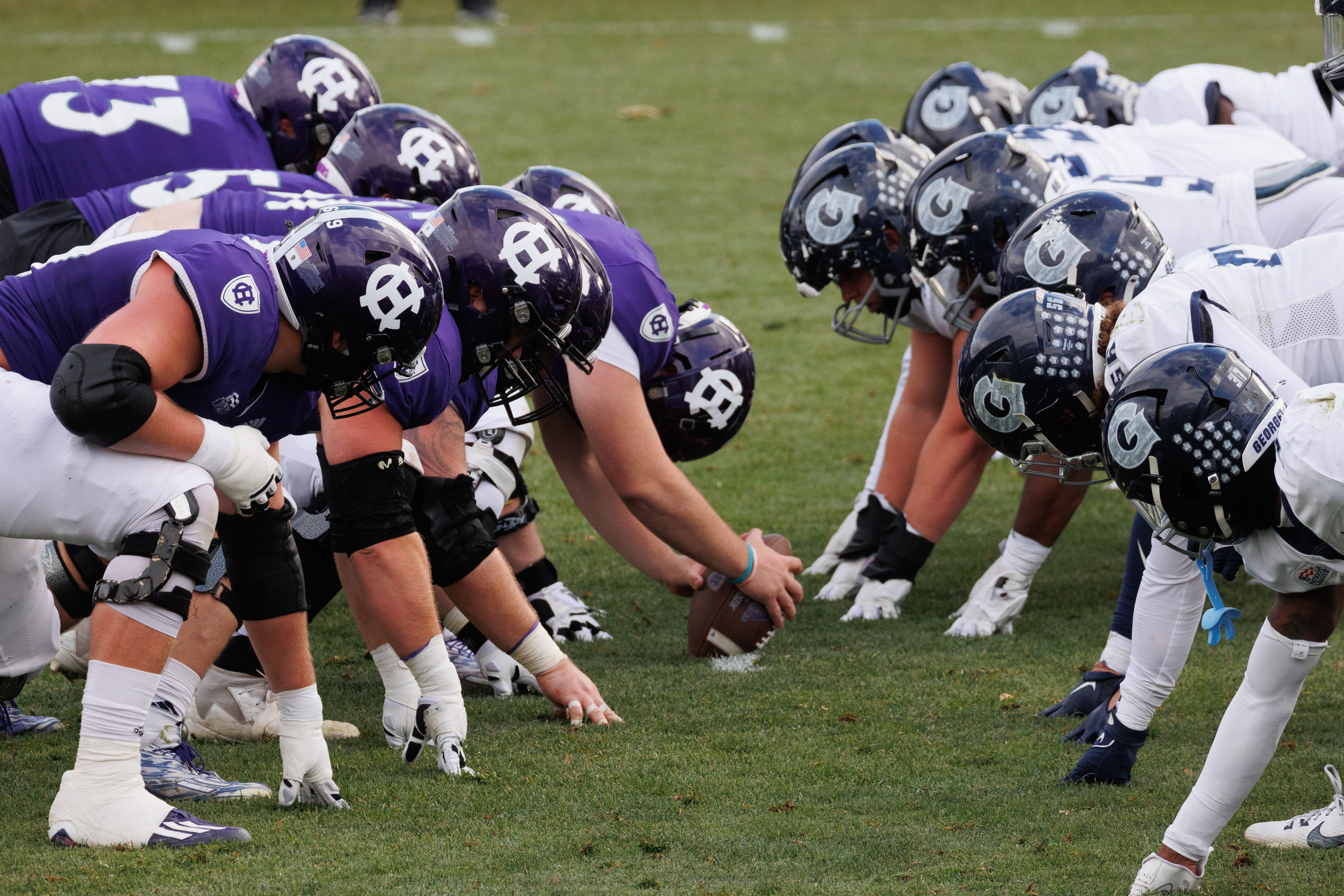
- November 18: The Crusaders beat the Georgetown Hoyas, 31-10

Patriot League co-champion
- Conference: Patriot League

Ranking
- FCS Coaches: No. 25
- Record: 7–4 (5–1 Patriot)
- Head coach: Bob Chesney (6th season)
- Offensive coordinator: Dean Kennedy (1st season)
- Offensive scheme: Spread
- Defensive coordinator: Scott James (6th season)
- Base defense: 4–3
- Home stadium: Fitton Field

2023 Patriot League football standings
	Conf.			Overall
Team	W		L	W		L
No. 21 Lafayette +^	5	–	1	9	–	3
Holy Cross +	5	–	1	7	–	4
Colgate	4	–	2	6	–	5
Georgetown	3	–	3	5	–	6
Fordham	2	–	4	6	–	5
Lehigh	1	–	5	2	–	9
Bucknell	1	–	5	4	–	7
+ – Conference co-champions; ^ – FCS playoff participant; Rankings from STATS Poll

The 2023 Holy Cross Crusaders football team represented the College of the Holy Cross as a member of the Patriot League during the 2023 NCAA Division I FCS football season. The Crusaders were led by sixth-year head coach Bob Chesney and played their home games at Fitton Field in Worcester, Massachusetts.

== Schedule ==
Date	Time	Opponent	Rank	Site	TV	Result	Attendance
September 2	2:00 p.m.	Merrimack*	No. 5	Fitton Field; Worcester, MA	ESPN+	W 42–20	13,117
September 9	12:00 p.m.	at Boston College*	No. 5	Alumni Stadium; Chestnut Hill, MA (rivalry)	ACCNX	L 28–31	40,122
September 16	12:00 p.m.	at Yale*	No. 6	Yale Bowl; New Haven, CT	ESPN+	W 49–24	4,968
September 23	2:00 p.m.	Colgate^{†}	No. 6	Fitton Field; Worcester, MA	ESPN+	W 47–7	12,578
September 30	5:00 p.m.	Harvard*	No. 6	Polar Park; Worcester, MA	ESPN+	L 28–38	7,906
October 7	1:00 p.m.	at Bucknell	No. 12	Christy Mathewson-Memorial Stadium; Lewisburg, PA	ESPN+	W 55–27	925
October 21	1:00 p.m.	Lafayette	No. 15	Fitton Field; Worcester, MA	ESPN+	L 35–38	10017
October 28	1:00 p.m.	at Fordham		Coffey Field; Bronx, NY	ESPN+	W 49–47	7,000
November 4	12:00 p.m.	at Lehigh		Goodman Stadium; Bethlehem, PA	ESPN+	W 28–24	3,528
November 11	12:00 p.m.	at Army*		Michie Stadium; West Point, NY	CBSSN	L 14–17	30,602
November 18	12:00 p.m.	Georgetown		Fitton Field; Worcester, MA	ESPN+	W 31–10	8,117
*Non-conference game; ^{†}Homecoming; Rankings from STATS Poll released prior to the game; All times are in Eastern time
