= 2023 Lehigh Mountain Hawks football team =

American college football season

2023 Lehigh Mountain Hawks football
- Conference: Patriot League
- Record: 2–9 (1–5 Patriot)
- Head coach: Kevin Cahill (1st season)
- Offensive coordinator: Dan Hunt (1st season)
- Defensive coordinator: Rich Nagy (1st season)
- Home stadium: Goodman Stadium

Uniform
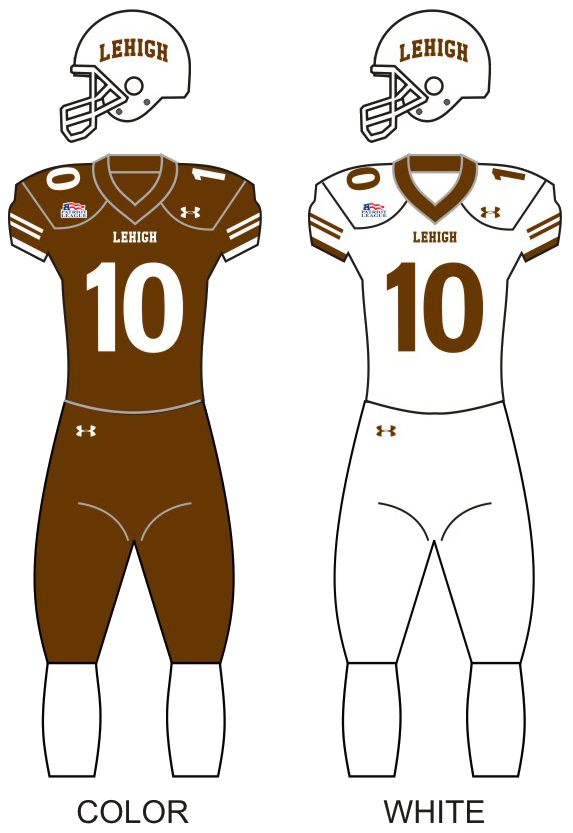

2023 Patriot League football standings
	Conf.			Overall
Team	W		L	W		L
No. 21 Lafayette +^	5	–	1	9	–	3
Holy Cross +	5	–	1	7	–	4
Colgate	4	–	2	6	–	5
Georgetown	3	–	3	5	–	6
Fordham	2	–	4	6	–	5
Lehigh	1	–	5	2	–	9
Bucknell	1	–	5	4	–	7
+ – Conference co-champions; ^ – FCS playoff participant; Rankings from STATS Poll

The 2023 Lehigh Mountain Hawks football team represented Lehigh University as a member of the Patriot League during the 2023 NCAA Division I FCS football season. The Mountain Hawks were led by first-year head coach Kevin Cahill and played home games at Goodman Stadium in Bethlehem, Pennsylvania.

== Preseason ==
Kevin Cahill, formerly the offensive coordinator and associate head coach at Yale University, was hired as Lehigh's new head football coach on December 19, 2022. He replaced Tom Gilmore, who had compiled a record of 9–27 in four season before resigning. During his introductory press conference, Cahill stated that his primary goal as head coach was to simply win games and end the long streak of losing seasons that Lehigh had endured.

=== Coaching staff ===
Cahill replaced almost the entire coaching staff at Lehigh shortly after starting his stint as head coach. His assistant coaches are:

- Dan Hunt as offensive coordinator/quarterbacks coach. Hunt spent 25 seasons coaching the Colgate Raiders including a seven-year stint as head coach from 2013 to 2020.
- Rich Nagy as defensive coordinator/linebackers coach who has 35 years of coaching experience including three years as the Allegheny Gators head coach from 2019 to 2022.
- Mike Kashurba, the special teams coordinator/Defensive Backs coach would be the sole holdover, entering his sixth year at Lehigh.
- Mike Morita as the offensive line/run game Coordinator who spent the last six years coaching the offensive line of the Virginia Union Panthers.
- Mark McMaster as the wide receivers/recruiting coordinator who was Yale's tight-ends coach from 2020 to 2022.
- Bobby Bozym as the tight-ends coach who was Yale's assistant offensive line coach.
- Chavarr Warren as the running backs coach who was the receivers coach for the Northwestern Oklahoma Rangers from 2020 to 2022.
- Demeitre Brim as the defensive line coach who spent the last five years on the Nebraska Cornhuskers defensive staff.
- Shamir Bearfield as the cornerbacks coach who had coached the Fairleigh Dickinson Florham Devils cornerbacks from 2020 to 2022.

=== Training camp ===
Prior to the first practice, fifth-year defensive lineman Dean Colton, senior linebacker Mike DeNucci and senior center George Padezanin were named the team's captains. Cahill has focused on building a new culture for the Mountain Hawks, seeking to create a "Lehigh Way" and improve team bonding. He has also sought to improve Lehigh's football culture, which has been suffering with declining attendance during the long losing streaks of the last half decade, by driving for more alumni and Bethlehem resident engagement. The Mountain Hawks' spring training ended on April 22 with their annual Brown and White game with sophomore Brayten Silbor being named the team's starting quarterback.

== Schedule ==
Date	Time	Opponent	Site	TV	Result	Attendance
September 2	12:00 p.m.	Villanova*	Goodman Stadium; Bethlehem, PA	ESPN+	L 10–38	4,360
September 9	4:00 p.m.	at Merrimack*	Harvard Stadium; Boston, MA†	NEC Front Row	W 14–12	1,562
September 16	12:00 p.m.	Cornell*	Goodman Stadium; Bethlehem, PA	ESPN+	L 20–23	4,087
September 23	1:30 p.m.	at Dartmouth*	Memorial Field; Hanover, NH	ESPN+	L 17–34	3,641
September 30	1:00 p.m.	at Monmouth*	Kessler Field; West Long Branch, NJ	FloSports	L 7–49	3,266
October 7	1:00 p.m.	at Fordham	Coffey Field; Bronx, NY	ESPN+	L 35–38	1675
October 14	12:00 p.m.	Georgetown	Goodman Stadium; Bethlehem, PA	ESPN+	L 7–17	2,828
October 21	1:00 p.m.	at Bucknell	Christy Mathewson-Memorial Stadium; Lewisburg, PA	ESPN+	W 27–18	966
November 4	12:00 p.m.	Holy Cross	Goodman Stadium; Bethlehem, PA	ESPN+	L 24–28	3,528
November 11	1:00 p.m.	at Colgate	Andy Kerr Stadium; Hamilton, NY	ESPN+	L 21–37	2,031
November 18	12:00 p.m.	No. 24 Lafayette	Goodman Stadium; Bethlehem, PA	ESPN+	L 21–49	14,453
*Non-conference game; Rankings from STATS Poll released prior to the game; All times are in Eastern time

† Moved from Duane Stadium, North Andover, MA due to a power outage.

== Game summaries ==
=== Villanova ===
	1	2	3	4	Total
Wildcats	14	17	7	0	38
Mountain Hawks	0	3	0	7	10

In Lehigh's home opener and head coach Kevin Cahill's first game with the Mountain Hawks, Lehigh lost 38 to 10 to the Villanova Wildcats. The Wildcat's quarterback Connor Watkins threw a pair of touchdowns and an interception, finishing the game 13 of 23 for 119 yards while their runningback, Jalen Jackson, ran for 144 yards and another two touchdowns. The Mountain Hawks' quarterback Brayton Silbor struggled with two interceptions early, but finished 23-for-38 with 206 yards and a late fourth quarter touchdown. This would be Villanova's 11th straight victory against the Mountain Hawks.

=== Merrimack ===
	1	2	3	4	Total
Mountain Hawks	0	14	0	0	14
Warriors	3	3	6	0	12

After a weather delay and a loss of power at Merrimack's Duane Stadium, the Mountain Hawks played the Merrimack Warriors at Harvard Stadium. There Mountain Hawks quarterback Brayten Silbor threw two touchdowns to receiver Connor Kennedy in the last 1:01 in the second quarter to go up 14–3 at halftime. In the third quarter Warrior's quarterback Gavin McCusker, who struggled, going 9 of 26 for 83 yards, but managed to score off a 2-yard run. However, the Mountain Hawks where able to hold on to win 14–12, the first win of Kevin Cahill's career as a head coach. Silbor finished the game 20 of 41 for 260 yards and two touchdowns and two interceptions.

=== Cornell ===
	1	2	3	4	Total
Big Red	14	3	0	6	23
Mountain Hawks	0	7	0	13	20

Billed as a rematch of the close 19-15 loss last year between the Mountain Hawks and the Big Red of Cornell, Cornell jumped to 17–0 lead with 4:20 left in the half after a series of quick drives. Lehigh would begin to start a comeback with Freshman runningback Luke Yoder having a 17-yard rushing touchdown to go into the half 17–7. Lehigh's first drive out of the half was an interception thrown by Brayten Silbor, to linebacker Holt Fletcher. The next drive Silbor threw another interception to Fletcher resulting in a Cornell field goal. Lehigh then scored off a four-yard run from Silbor and Cornell responded with another field goal. With 1:18 seconds left in the game Silbor found Sophomore receiver Geoffrey Jamiel for a score but the extra point was blocked. Lehigh would attempt, and fail, to recover an onside kick, and Cornell ran out the remaining time to win 23–20. Coach Cahill praised his team's effort, but also stated the team should never have gotten into the onside situation, saying that “We fought hard, and we lost by three points — that’s a loser’s mentality, (Nobody) in that locker room has that mentality and not one guy in that locker room was excited about what just happened.”

=== Dartmouth ===
	1	2	3	4	Total
Mountain Hawks	7	3	0	7	17
Big Green	7	10	14	3	34

Dartmouth's longtime head coach, Buddy Teevens, died from injuries sustained in a bicycle accident in March just days before the game at the age of 66. Sammy McCorkle served as the teams' full season interim head coach and lead the Big Green in a remembrance game against the Mountain Hawks. Lehigh opening scoring with a 95-yard scoop-and-score by Logan Jones. Dartmouth would respond with a long drive that culminated in a 7-yard touchdown pass. Lehigh would then kick a field goal with 6:59 left in the first half, tying the game 10-10. Dartmouth would dominate the second half with two touchdowns and a field goal, including a 99-yard rushing touchdown. Lehigh would try to answer with a late fourth quarter touchdown off a 17-play drive as well as intercepting Dartmouth's Dylan Cadwallader, however, the Mountain hawks would fall well short, losing 34–17. In an attempt to kick-start their offense, the mountain hawks pulled starting Quarterback Brayten Silbor for Senior Dante Perri in the third quarter. Lehigh was held to just 167-yards, 72 of which came from the 10-18 Silbor and 27 from the 8-12 Perri, while Dartmouth had 349 yards, 219 coming on the ground, in the blow-out Mountain Hawks loss.

=== Monmouth ===
	1	2	3	4	Total
Mountain Hawks	0	7	0	0	7
Hawks	7	21	21	0	49

In their non-conference finale, the Mountain Hawks visited the Monmouth Hawks. The game started with a competitive sharing of scoring drives, with both Lehigh's Brayten Silbor scoring a 1-yard rushing touchdown, and the Hawks' Marquez McCray throwing a short touchdown pass. However, Lehigh's first score would be their only score as Monmouth shut Lehigh's offense down and scored another six touchdowns unanswered. The Hawks had 333-yards in the air and 109-yards rushing to Lehigh's 163 passing yards from Silbor, and 43 rushing yards from Jack DiPietro. Coach Cahill's closing remarks were: "Every single one of these kids could quit right now and pack it in the for the season, but they’re not going to do that. We have to continue to build the culture and we have a lot of fixing to do.” The game was also notable for being Lehigh's homecoming game, also known as Founders Weekend, and the school's first ever away homecoming game, with the game being streamed on several big screens on campus to visiting families and alumni.

=== Fordham ===
	1	2	3	4	Total
Mountain Hawks	7	14	7	7	35
Rams	0	17	7	14	38

Lehigh's conference opener began with a 52-yard scoring drive for the visiting Mountain Hawks, capped with a 9-yard touchdown pass from Brayten Silbor to Junior Dylan McFadden. The Mountain Hawks came out of halftime up 21–17. After a two-yard rushing touchdown from the Rams to start the second half, the Mountain Hawks closed the third quarter with a touchdown reception by Sophomore Geoffrey Jamiel. The Mountain Hawks held a 35–24 lead early in the fourth quarter but in just two minutes the Rams would score a touchdown and field goal to tie the game 35-35. Fordham would win with a 45-yard field goal as time expired. Silbor was 19-of-30 passing for 257 yards and three touchdowns.

=== Georgetown ===
	1	2	3	4	Total
Hoyas	7	0	3	7	17
Mountain Hawks	0	0	7	0	7

On a rainy day, despite Lehigh's first two drives including big passing plays, the Georgetown's Hoyas took the lead with the first score of the game, a touchdown pass, with 5:45 remaining in the half. Early in the third quarter, the Mountain Hawks would respond with a 20-yard touchdown pass from Silbor to first year receiver Mason Humphrey. The Hoyas would improve their series record against the Mountain Hawks to 22–2, marking just the second time since they joined the Patriot League where they have beaten Lehigh. Brayten Silbor was 11-for-34 in the air for 205 yards and two interceptions. After the game, coach Cahill expressed frustration with the team's losing streak, stating that “It’s getting frustrating the way we find ways to just end up on a lower half of the scoreboard.”

=== Bucknell ===
	1	2	3	4	Total
Mountain Hawks	7	13	0	7	27
Bisons	0	3	0	15	18

Lehigh went into their third conference game a three-point underdog to the Bucknell Bison and seeking to end their five-game losing streak. Near the end of the second quarter the Mountain Hawks built a 20–0 lead, that would be met with a late field goal by Bucknell to make it 20–3 at the end of the half. By the end of the third quarter lehigh had a 27–3 lead. Bucknell would attempt a late, fourth-quarter comeback, but fell short with the final score being 27–18. Freshman running back Luke Yoder rushed for 183 yards and two touchdowns. After the game, Coach Cahill stated that he was happy with the defensive performance of the Mountain Hawks, but stated that "Offensively, we still need to get better." Lehigh would improve to 2–6, while also securing their first conference victory.

=== Holy Cross ===
	1	2	3	4	Total
Crusaders	0	21	7	0	28
Mountain Hawks	14	7	3	0	24

Home against the No. 21 Holy Cross Crusaders Lehigh came out to an early 14–0 lead just five minutes into the first quarter from a 21-yard touchdown pass from Silbor to senior wide receiver Eric Johnson and a defensive fumble recovery for a touchdown by senior linebacker Mike DeNucci. However, the Crusader's runningback, Jordan Fuller, rushed for 228-yards and two touchdowns. Following a 1-yard rushing touchdown from the Mountain Hawk's Luke Yoder the game was tied 21–21 at the half. After a Crusader turnover, Lehigh's kicker Nick Garrido scored a career long 41-yard field goal to give Lehigh a 24–21 lead. However, after a failed surpirse onside kick, the Crusaders scored to finish the game 28–24.

=== Colgate ===
	1	2	3	4	Total
Mountain Hawks	0	0	7	14	21
Raiders	3	13	21	0	37

Lehigh traveled to the Colgate Raiders for their last regular season and conference game before rivalry week with Lafayette. Colgate was seeking to keep their hopes at the Patriot League title alive, while Lehigh was looking to improve from 2–7. Colgate opened the game by scoring 30-points unanswered. Mountain Hawk quarterback Brayten Silbor left the game after a 1-yard rush in the second quarter and did not return, being replaced by Dante Perri. Late in the third quarter running back Luke Yoder put the first Lehigh points on the board, followed by two fourth quarter touchdown passes by Perri to senior wide receiver Connor Kennedy and true freshman wide receiver Mason Humphrey. Coach Cahill blamed the loss on the way the Mountain Hawks practiced during the week.

=== Lafayette ===
	1	2	3	4	Total
Leopards	7	7	14	21	49
Mountain Hawks	7	14	0	0	21

The 159th meeting of The Rivalry saw the underdog Mountain Hawks jump to an early lead but suffered a total offensive meltdown, with the first drive of the second half seeing Lehigh's Dante Perri throw an interception. Lafayette would outpace Lehigh 326 yards to just 53 yards, scoring five touchdowns to secure not only the bragging rights from the Rivalry, but also clinching the Patriot League divisional title to secure a spot in the FCS playoffs. Lafayette's coach John Troxell credited the win to the early interception in the second half, while Cahill blamed his Mountain Hawks' inability to finish a game with a win.
