= 2023 Wagner Seahawks football team =

American college football season

2023 Wagner Seahawks football
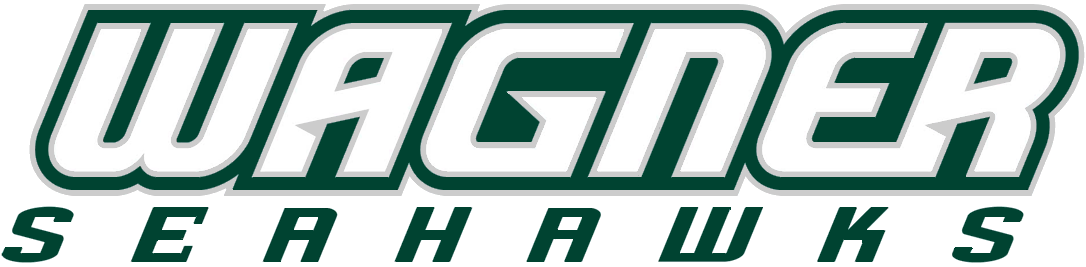
- Conference: Northeast Conference
- Record: 4–7 (3–4 NEC)
- Head coach: Tom Masella (4th season)
- Offensive coordinator: Stephen Matos (1st season)
- Home stadium: Wagner College Stadium

2023 Northeast Conference football standings
	Conf.			Overall
Team	W		L	W		L
Duquesne $^	6	–	1	7	–	5
Saint Francis (PA)	4	–	3	4	–	6
Merrimack	4	–	3	5	–	6
Stonehill *	4	–	3	5	–	5
LIU	4	–	3	4	–	7
Wagner	3	–	4	4	–	7
Sacred Heart	2	–	5	2	–	9
Central Connecticut	1	–	6	3	–	8
$ – Conference champion; ^ – FCS playoff participant; Note: Stonehill ineligible for NEC title and FCS postseason play due to transition from NCAA Division II; Rankings from STATS Poll

The 2023 Wagner Seahawks football team represented Wagner College as a member of the Northeast Conference (NEC) during the 2023 NCAA Division I FCS football season. The Seahawks, led by fourth-year head coach Tom Masella, and played their home games at Wagner College Stadium.

== Schedule ==
Date	Time	Opponent	Site	TV	Result	Attendance
September 2	6:00 p.m.	at Fordham*	Coffey Field; Bronx, NY	ESPN+	L 16–46	3,147
September 9	3:30 p.m.	at Navy*	Navy-Marine Corps Memorial Stadium; Annapolis, MD	CBSSN	L 0–24	29,798
September 16	1:00 p.m.	at Sacred Heart	Campus Field; Fairfield, CT	NEC Front Row	W 17–10	5,174
September 23	4:00 p.m.	Merrimack^{†}	Wagner College Stadium; Staten Island, NY	NEC Front Row	W 30–27	1,362
September 30	3:30 p.m.	at Rutgers*	SHI Stadium; Piscataway, NJ	BTN	L 3–52	40,065
October 12	7:00 p.m.	at Saint Francis (PA)	DeGol Field; Loretto, PA	CBSSN	L 7–31	2,878
October 21	12:00 p.m.	Central Connecticut	Wagner College Stadium; Staten Island, NY	NEC Front Row	L 3–17	1,482
October 28	12:00 p.m.	Stonehill	Wagner College Stadium; Staten Island, NY	NEC Front Row	W 28–17	
November 4	12:00 p.m.	Duquesne	Wagner College Stadium; Staten Island, NY	NEC Front Row	L 26–34	
November 11	12:00 p.m.	at LIU	Bethpage Federal Credit Union Stadium; Brookville, NY	NEC Front Row	L 14–49	2,045
November 18	12:00 p.m.	Post*	Wagner College Stadium; Staten Island, NY	NEC Front Row	W 48-21	1,513
*Non-conference game; ^{†}Homecoming; All times are in Eastern time

== Game summaries ==
=== at Navy ===
Wagner Seahawks (FCS) (0-1) vs Navy Midshipmen (0-1) – Game summary

Quarter	1	2	3	4	Total
Seahawks (FCS)	0	0	0	0	0
Midshipmen	7	10	0	7	24

at Navy-Marine Corps Memorial Stadium • Annapolis, Maryland

- Date: September 9th
- Game time: 3:30 p.m. EST
- Game weather: Temperature: 85 °F (29 °C) • Wind: E 10 miles per hour (16 km/h) • Weather: Rainy/Cloudy
- Game attendance: 29,798
- Referee: Darryl DeBerry
- TV announcers (CBSSN): Chick Hernandez (play-by-play), Randy Cross (analyst) & Sheehan Stanwick Burch (sideline)

Game information

First quarter

- (7:46) NAVY – Daba Fofana 3-yard rush, Evan Warren kick (Drive: 7 plays, 77 yards, 3:33; Navy 7-0)

Second quarter

- (2:20) NAVY – Evan Warren 27-yard field goal (Drive: 12 plays, 57 yards, 6:06; Navy 10-0)
- (0:08) NAVY – Camari Williams 8-yard pass from Tai Lavatai, Evan Warren kick (Drive: 5 plays, 80 yards, 0:40; Navy 17-0)

Third quarter

- No scoring this quarter

Fourth quarter

- (10:44) NAVY – Eli Heidenreich 46-yard, Evan Warren kick (Drive: 2 plays, 53 yards, 0:43; Navy 24-0)

Statistics	Wagner (FCS)	Navy
First downs	12	18
Plays–yards	67–227	62–408
Rushes–yards	32–84	44–245
Passing yards	143	163
Passing: comp–att–int	18–35–1	11–18–0
Time of possession	29:18	26:23

Team	Category	Player	Statistics
Wagner (FCS)	Passing	Damien Mazil	11/23, 100 yards, INT
Wagner (FCS)	Rushing	Zachary Palmer-Smith	13 carries, 52 yards
Wagner (FCS)	Receiving	Mark Didio Jr.	8 receptions, 57 yards
Navy	Passing	Tai Lavatai	8/13, 161 yards, TD
Navy	Rushing	Eli Heidenreich	4 carries, 66 yards, TD
Navy	Receiving	Anton Hall Jr.	1 reception, 45 yards

=== at Rutgers ===
	1	2	3	4	Total
Seahawks	0	3	0	0	3
Scarlet Knights	10	14	14	14	52

Statistics	WAG	RUTG
First downs	6	28
Total yards	106	436
Rushing yards	83	267
Passing yards	23	169
Turnovers	0	0
Time of possession	22:23	37:37

Team	Category	Player	Statistics
Wagner	Passing	Steven Krajewski	4/6, 19 yards
Wagner	Rushing	Rickey Spruill	7 carries, 36 yards
Wagner	Receiving	Kobi Ray-Reed	2 receptions, 10 yards
Rutgers	Passing	Gavin Wimsatt	12/19, 146 yards, 1 TD
Rutgers	Rushing	Kyle Monangai	19 carries, 87 yards, 1 TD
Rutgers	Receiving	JaQuae Jackson	4 receptions, 71 yards
