= 2023 Duquesne Dukes football team =

American college football season

2023 Duquesne Dukes football

NEC champion

NCAA Division I First Round, L 7–40 at Youngstown State
- Conference: Northeast Conference
- Record: 7–5 (6–1 NEC)
- Head coach: Jerry Schmitt (19th season)
- Offensive coordinator: Anthony Doria (8th season)
- Co-defensive coordinators: Mike Craig (2nd season); Scott Farison (2nd season)
- Home stadium: Arthur J. Rooney Athletic Field

2023 Northeast Conference football standings
	Conf.			Overall
Team	W		L	W		L
Duquesne $^	6	–	1	7	–	5
Saint Francis (PA)	4	–	3	4	–	6
Merrimack	4	–	3	5	–	6
Stonehill *	4	–	3	5	–	5
LIU	4	–	3	4	–	7
Wagner	3	–	4	4	–	7
Sacred Heart	2	–	5	2	–	9
Central Connecticut	1	–	6	3	–	8
$ – Conference champion; ^ – FCS playoff participant; Note: Stonehill ineligible for NEC title and FCS postseason play due to transition from NCAA Division II; Rankings from STATS Poll

The 2023 Duquesne Dukes football team represented Duquesne University as a member of the Northeast Conference (NEC) during the 2023 NCAA Division I FCS football season. The Dukes were led by 19th-year head coach Jerry Schmitt and played home games at Arthur J. Rooney Athletic Field in Pittsburgh.

== Schedule ==
Date	Time	Opponent	Site	TV	Result	Attendance
September 2	12:00 p.m.	Edinboro*	Arthur J. Rooney Athletic Field; Pittsburgh, PA	NEC Front Row	W 49–7	1,673
September 9	6:00 p.m.	at West Virginia*	Mountaineer Field; Morgantown, WV	ESPN+	L 17–56	50,037
September 16	7:00 p.m.	at Coastal Carolina*	Brooks Stadium; Conway, SC	ESPN+	L 7–66	18,116
September 30	12:00 p.m.	at LIU	Bethpage Federal Credit Union Stadium; Brookville, NY	NEC Front Row	W 31–28	1,092
October 7	3:00 p.m.	at No. 9 Delaware*	Delaware Stadium; Newark, DE	FloSports	L 17–43	18,952
October 14	12:00 p.m.	Central Connecticut	Rooney Field; Pittsburgh, PA	NEC Front Row	W 44–20	908
October 21	1:00 p.m.	Saint Francis^{†}	Rooney Field; Pittsburgh, PA	NEC Front Row	W 38–35	3,052
October 28	12:00 p.m.	at Sacred Heart	Campus Field; Fairfield, CT	ESPN+	W 27–0	6,822
November 4	12:00 p.m.	at Wagner	Wagner College Stadium; Staten Island, NY	NEC Front Row	W 34–26	1
November 11	12:00 p.m.	Stonehill	Rooney Field; Pittsburgh, PA	ESPN+	L 28–33	1,656
November 18	12:00 p.m.	at Merrimack	Duane Stadium; North Andover, MA	NEC Front Row	W 26–14	2,165
November 25	5:00 p.m.	at No. 21 Youngstown State*	Stambaugh Stadium; Youngstown, OH (NCAA Division I First Round)	ESPN+	L 7–40	3,866
*Non-conference game; ^{†}Homecoming; Rankings from STATS Poll released prior to the game; All times are in Eastern time
