= 2023 Georgetown Hoyas football team =

American college football season

2023 Georgetown Hoyas football

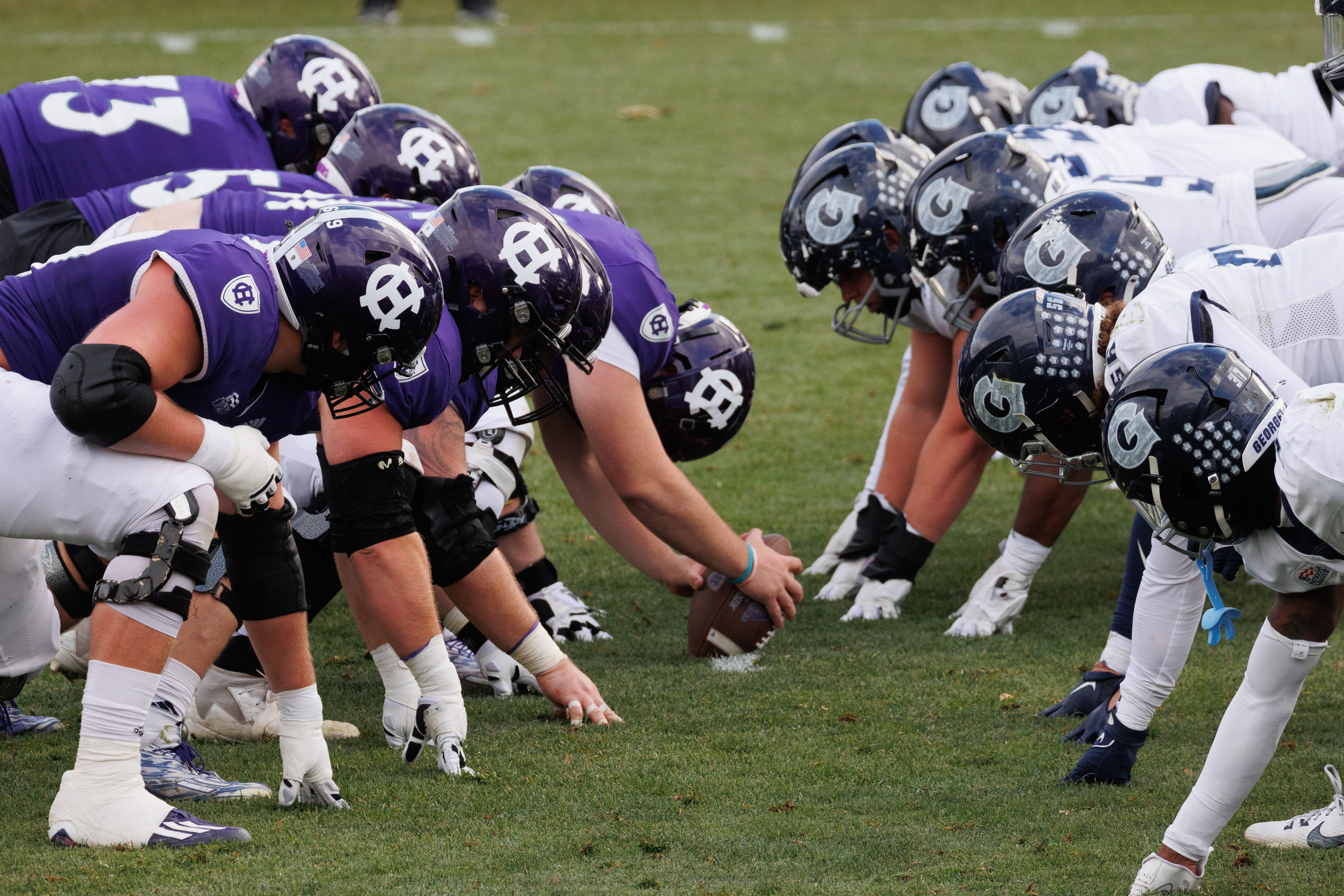
- November 18: The Hoyas lost to the Holy Cross Crusaders, 10–31
- Conference: Patriot League
- Record: 5–6 (3–3 Patriot)
- Head coach: Rob Sgarlata (9th season)
- Offensive coordinator: Rob Spence (5th season)
- Defensive coordinator: Kevin Doherty (6th season)
- Home stadium: Cooper Field

2023 Patriot League football standings
	Conf.			Overall
Team	W		L	W		L
No. 21 Lafayette +^	5	–	1	9	–	3
Holy Cross +	5	–	1	7	–	4
Colgate	4	–	2	6	–	5
Georgetown	3	–	3	5	–	6
Fordham	2	–	4	6	–	5
Lehigh	1	–	5	2	–	9
Bucknell	1	–	5	4	–	7
+ – Conference co-champions; ^ – FCS playoff participant; Rankings from STATS Poll

The 2023 Georgetown Hoyas football team represented Georgetown University as a member of the Patriot League during the 2023 NCAA Division I FCS football season. Led by ninth-year head coach Rob Sgarlata, the Hoyas played home games at Cooper Field in Washington, D.C.

== Schedule ==
Date	Time	Opponent	Site	TV	Result	Attendance
September 2	12:30 p.m.	Marist*	Cooper Field; Washington, DC	ESPN+	W 49–7	1,687
September 9	12:30 p.m.	Sacred Heart*	Cooper Field; Washington, DC	ESPN+	W 27–10	2,009
September 16	12:30 p.m.	Stonehill*	Cooper Field; Washington, DC	ESPN+	L 20–23	2,463
September 23	1:00 p.m.	at Columbia*	Robert K. Kraft Field at Lawrence A. Wien Stadium; New York, NY	ESPN+	L 0–30	3,197
September 30	2:00 p.m.	Fordham^{†}	Cooper Field; Washington, DC	ESPN+	W 28–24	4,367
October 7	1:00 p.m.	at Penn*	Franklin Field; Philadelphia, PA	ESPN+	L 39–42 ^{OT}	2,250
October 14	1:00 p.m.	at Lehigh	Goodman Stadium; Bethlehem, PA	ESPN+	W 17–7	2,828
October 21	3:00 p.m.	Colgate	Cooper Field; Washington, DC	ESPN+	L 28–18	3,137
October 28	12:30 p.m.	No. 21 Lafayette	Cooper Field; Washington, DC	ESPN+	L 25–35	4,418
November 11	1:00 p.m.	at Bucknell	Christy Mathewson–Memorial Stadium; Lewisburg, PA	ESPN+	W 50–47 ^{OT}	1,004
November 18	12:00 p.m.	at Holy Cross	Fitton Field; Worcester, MA	ESPN+	L 10–31	8,117
*Non-conference game; ^{†}Homecoming; Rankings from STATS Poll released prior to the game; All times are in Eastern time
