= 2020 Sacred Heart Pioneers football team =

American college football season

2020 Sacred Heart Pioneers football

NEC champion

NEC Championship Game, W 34–27 ^{OT} vs. Duquesne

NCAA Division I First Round, L 10–19 vs. Delaware
- Conference: Northeast Conference
- Record: 3–2 (2–1 NEC)
- Head coach: Mark Nofri (9th season)
- Offensive coordinator: Matt Gardner (4th season)
- Defensive coordinator: Michael Cooke (4th season)
- Home stadium: Campus Field

2020 Northeast Conference football standings
| | Conf. | | | Overall |
| Team | W | | L | W | | L |
|---|---|---|---|---|---|---|
| Duquesne y | 4 | – | 0 | 4 | – | 1 |
| Sacred Heart y$^ | 2 | – | 1 | 3 | – | 2 |
| LIU | 2 | – | 2 | 2 | – | 2 |
| Bryant | 2 | – | 2 | 2 | – | 2 |
| Wagner | 0 | – | 2 | 0 | – | 2 |
| Merrimack* | 0 | – | 3 | 0 | – | 3 |
Championship: Sacred Heart 34, Duquesne 27 (OT)
$ – Conference champion; y – Championship game participant; ^ – FCS playoff participant; Note: Due to COVID-19, the Northeast suspended the 2020 football season. * – Merrimack ineligible for NEC title and FCS postseason play due to transition to NCAA Division I Central Connecticut and Saint Francis (PA) opted out of the spring season.; Rankings from STATS Poll

The 2020 Sacred Heart Pioneers football team represented Sacred Heart University as a member of the Northeast Conference (NEC) in the 2020–21 NCAA Division I FCS football season. Due to the impact of the COVID-19 pandemic, Sacred Heart original's schedule for the fall of 2020 was cancelled, and the team played a shortened schedule in the spring of 2021 instead. Led by ninth-year head coach Mark Nofri, the Pioneers compiled an overall record of 3–2 with a mark of 2–1 in conference play, placing second in the NEC during the regular season. Sacred Heart qualified for the NEC Championship Game and defeated Duquesne to win the conference title. The Pioneers advanced to the NCAA Division I Football Championship playoffs, losing in the first round to Delaware. Sacred Heart played home games at Campus Field in Fairfield, Connecticut.

== Schedule ==
Sacred Heart had games scheduled against Stony Brook (September 26) and Penn (October 10), which were later canceled before the start of the 2020 season.

| Date | Time | Opponent | Site | TV | Result | Attendance |
|---|---|---|---|---|---|---|
| March 7 | 12:00 p.m. | at Duquesne | Rooney Field; Pittsburgh, PA | NEC Front Row | L 27–30 | |
| March 14 | 12:00 p.m. | LIU | Campus Field; Fairfield, CT | ESPN3 | W 35–7 | 400 |
| March 21 | 1:00 p.m. | Merrimack | Campus Field; Fairfield, CT | NEC Front Row | W 26–9 | |
| March 28 | 1:00 p.m. | at Wagner | Wagner College Stadium; Staten Island, NY | | Cancelled | |
| April 11 | 2:00 p.m. | at No. 25 Duquesne* | Rooney Field; Pittsburgh, PA (NEC Championship Game) | ESPN3 | W 34–27 ^{OT} | |
| April 24 | 7:00 p.m. | at No. 5 Delaware* | Delaware Stadium; Newark, DE (NCAA Division I First Round) | ESPN3 | L 10–19 | |
*Non-conference game; Rankings from STATS Poll released prior to the game; All times are in Eastern time
