= 2020 Duquesne Dukes football team =

American college football season

2020 Duquesne Dukes football

NEC Championship Game, L 27–34 ^{OT} vs. Sacred Heart
- Conference: Northeast Conference
- Record: 4–1 (4–0 NEC)
- Head coach: Jerry Schmitt (16th season)
- Offensive coordinator: Anthony Doria (5th season)
- Defensive coordinator: Dave Opfar (11th season)
- Co-defensive coordinator: Scott Farison (3rd season)
- Home stadium: Arthur J. Rooney Athletic Field

2020 Northeast Conference football standings
	Conf.			Overall
Team	W		L	W		L
Duquesne y	4	–	0	4	–	1
Sacred Heart y$^	2	–	1	3	–	2
LIU	2	–	2	2	–	2
Bryant	2	–	2	2	–	2
Wagner	0	–	2	0	–	2
Merrimack*	0	–	3	0	–	3
Championship: Sacred Heart 34, Duquesne 27 (OT)
$ – Conference champion; y – Championship game participant; ^ – FCS playoff participant; Note: Due to COVID-19, the Northeast suspended the 2020 football season. * – Merrimack ineligible for NEC title and FCS postseason play due to transition to NCAA Division I Central Connecticut and Saint Francis (PA) opted out of the spring season.; Rankings from STATS Poll

The 2020 Duquesne Dukes football team represented Duquesne University in the 2020–21 NCAA Division I FCS football season. They were led by 16th-year head coach Jerry Schmitt and played their home games at Arthur J. Rooney Athletic Field. They played as a member of the Northeast Conference.

== Schedule ==
Date	Time	Opponent	Rank	Site	TV	Result	Attendance
March 7	12:00 p.m.	Sacred Heart		Rooney Field; Pittsburgh, PA	NEC Front Row	W 30–27	
March 14	12:00 p.m.	at Wagner		Wagner College Stadium; Staten Island, NY	NEC Front Row	W 17–0	
March 21	12:00 p.m.	LIU		Rooney Field; Pittsburgh, PA	ESPN+	W 35–17	250
March 28	12:00 p.m.	at Bryant		Beirne Stadium; Smithfield, RI	ESPN3	W 20–10	
April 11	2:00 p.m.	Sacred Heart	No. 25	Rooney Field; Pittsburgh, PA (NEC Championship Game)	ESPN3	L 27–34 ^{OT}	
Rankings from STATS Poll released prior to the game; All times are in Eastern time
