= 2023 Lafayette Leopards football team =

American college football season

2023 Lafayette Leopards football

Patriot League co-champion

NCAA Division I First Round, L 34–36 at Delaware
- Conference: Patriot League

Ranking
- STATS: No. 21
- FCS Coaches: No. 19
- Record: 9–3 (5–1 Patriot)
- Head coach: John Troxell (2nd season)
- Offensive coordinator: T. J. Dimuzio (2nd season)
- Defensive coordinator: Mike Saint Germain (2nd season)
- Home stadium: Fisher Stadium

2023 Patriot League football standings
	Conf.			Overall
Team	W		L	W		L
No. 21 Lafayette +^	5	–	1	9	–	3
Holy Cross +	5	–	1	7	–	4
Colgate	4	–	2	6	–	5
Georgetown	3	–	3	5	–	6
Fordham	2	–	4	6	–	5
Lehigh	1	–	5	2	–	9
Bucknell	1	–	5	4	–	7
+ – Conference co-champions; ^ – FCS playoff participant; Rankings from STATS Poll

The 2023 Lafayette Leopards football team represented Lafayette College as a member of the Patriot League during the 2023 NCAA Division I FCS football season. The Leopards were led by second-year head coach John Troxell and played their home games at Fisher Stadium located in Easton, Pennsylvania.

== Schedule ==
Date	Time	Opponent	Rank	Site	TV	Result	Attendance
September 2	6:00 p.m.	at Sacred Heart*		Campus Field; Fairfield, CT	NEC Front Row	W 19–14	5,634
September 9	6:00 p.m.	at No. 21 (FBS) Duke*		Wallace Wade Stadium; Durham, NC	ACCNX/ESPN+	L 7–42	17,481
September 16	12:30 p.m.	Columbia*		Fisher Stadium; Easton, PA	ESPN+	W 24–3	4,523
September 23	3:30 p.m.	Monmouth*		Fisher Stadium; Easton, PA	ESPN+	W 28–20	1,497
September 30	3:30 p.m.	Bucknell^{†}		Fisher Stadium; Easton, PA	ESPN+	W 56–22	4,283
October 7	1:00 p.m.	at Princeton*		Princeton University Stadium; Princeton, NJ	ESPN+	W 12–9	4,059
October 21	1:00 p.m.	at No. 15 Holy Cross		Fitton Field; Worcester, MA	ESPN+	W 38–35	10017
October 28	12:30 p.m.	at Georgetown	No. 21	Cooper Field; Washington, DC	ESPN+	W 35–25	2,739
November 4	12:30 p.m.	Colgate	No. 20	Fisher Stadium; Easton, PA	ESPN+	L 34–37 ^{OT}	4,418
November 11	12:30 p.m.	Fordham	No. 25	Fisher Stadium; Easton, PA	ESPN+	W 24–16	4,256
November 18	12:00 p.m.	at Lehigh	No. 24	Goodman Stadium; Bethlehem, PA	ESPN+	W 49–21	14,453
November 25	2:00 p.m.	at No. 11 Delaware*	No. 20	Delaware Stadium; Newark, DE (NCAA Division I First Round)	ESPN+	L 34–36	4,039
*Non-conference game; ^{†}Homecoming; Rankings from STATS Poll released prior to the game; All times are in Eastern time
