= Bryan Collins =

American football coach (1965–2023)

Biographical details
- Born: July 30, 1964; Queens, New York, U.S.
- Died: July 8, 2023 (aged 58); Sayville, New York, U.S.

Playing career
- c. 1985: St. John's
- Position: Linebacker

Coaching career (HC unless noted)
- c. 1990: St. Francis Prep (NY)
- 1991–1993: C. W. Post (assistant)
- 1994–1995: Merchant Marine (DC/LB)
- 1996–1997: C. W. Post (DC/LB)
- 1998–2018: C. W. Post / LIU Post
- 2019–2021: LIU
- 2021–2022: Stony Brook (DL)
- 2023: Stony Brook (DC)

Head coaching record
- Overall: 162–84
- Tournaments: 3–6 (NCAA D-II playoffs)

Accomplishments and honors

Championships
- 8 NE-10 (2001–2002, 2004–2006, 2014, 2016, 2018); 2 EFC Atlantic Division (1999–2000); 1 PSAC Eastern Division (2011)

Bryan Collins (July 30, 1964 – July 8, 2023) was an American football coach. He served as the head football coach at Long Island University (LIU) from 1998 to 2021, staying with the team through its merger from the Division II LIU Post Pioneers to the Division I LIU Sharks.

Collins served as the defensive line coach for the Stony Brook Seawolves for two seasons. He was promoted to defensive coordinator prior to the 2023 season, but died suddenly in July 2023 at the age of 58.

== Career ==
=== Assistant coaching ===
Collins graduated from St. John's University in Queens in 1987, where he played linebacker on the football team. He began his coaching career as an assistant football coach at St. Francis Preparatory School in Fresh Meadows, Queens.

He was an assistant coach at C.W. Post University from 1991 to 1993 before leaving for the United States Merchant Marine Academy to become their defensive coordinator and linebackers coach from 1994 to 1995.

=== C.W. Post / LIU Post / LIU ===
In 1996, Collins returned to C.W. Post in the same role and he was elevated to head coach in 1998. C.W. Post rebranded to the LIU Post Pioneers in 2012. Collins won eight Northeast-10 Conference championships at C.W. Post/LIU Post. As the head coach for the Post program, Collins went 160–72. From 2006 to 2016, Collins also served as the athletic director of the LIU Post program.

After the 2018 season, the Division II LIU Post Pioneers program merged with the Division I LIU Brooklyn Blackbirds program to become the Division I LIU Sharks. While Collins' first Division I season ended with a 0–10 record, he went 2–2 the following year in the shortened COVID-19 makeup season in 2020–21 and was nominated as a finalist for the Eddie Robinson Award, given to the top coach in FCS football. Collins suddenly stepped down from the program in June 2021. In two seasons, Collins went 2–12 as the head coach of the Sharks.

=== Stony Brook ===
On August 17, 2021, Collins was named the defensive line coach for the Stony Brook Seawolves.

After two seasons, Collins was promoted to defensive coordinator in January 2023. Collins died on July 8, 2023, from a sudden cardiac event at age 58 before coaching a game as the Seawolves' defensive coordinator.

== Personal life ==
Collins was married to his wife, Patti, and had two children.

== Head coaching record ==
Year	Team	Overall	Conference	Standing	Bowl/playoffs
C. W. Post Pioneers (Eastern Football Conference) (1998–2000)
1998	C. W. Post	7–3	6–2	T–2nd (Atlantic)	
1999	C. W. Post	9–2	7–1	1st (Atlantic)	
2000	C. W. Post	8–2	7–1	1st (Atlantic)	
C. W. Post Pioneers (Northeast-10 Conference) (2001–2007)
2001	C. W. Post	11–1	9–1	1st	
2002	C. W. Post	11–1	10–0	1st	L NCAA Division II First Round
2003	C. W. Post	9–2	8–1	2nd	
2004	C. W. Post	8–3	8–1	T–1st	L NCAA Division II First Round
2005	C. W. Post	10–3	8–1	1st	L NCAA Division II Quarterfinal
2006	C. W. Post	7–3	7–2	T–1st	
2007	C. W. Post	4–6	4–5	T–6th	
C. W. Post / LIU Pioneers (Pennsylvania State Athletic Conference) (2008–2012)
2008	C. W. Post	3–8	2–5	6th (Eastern)	
2009	C. W. Post	6–5	5–2	T–2nd (Eastern)	
2010	C. W. Post	7–4	5–2	3rd (Eastern)	
2011	C. W. Post	7–4	6–1	T–1st (Eastern)	
2012	LIU Post	3–7	2–5	5th (Eastern)	
LIU Post Pioneers (Northeast-10 Conference) (2013–2018)
2013	LIU Post	5–6	3–6	T–7th	
2014	LIU Post	8–4	7–2	2nd	L NCAA Division II First Round
2015	LIU Post	7–4	5–4	T–4th	
2016	LIU Post	12–1	9–0	1st	L NCAA Division II Second Round
2017	LIU Post	8–2	7–2	2nd	
2018	LIU Post	10–1	9–0	1st	L NCAA Division II First Round
C. W. Post:		160–72	134–44		
LIU Sharks (Northeast Conference) (2019–2021)
2019	LIU	0–10	0–7	8th	
2020–21	LIU	2–2	2–2	T–3rd	
LIU:		2–12	2–9		
Total:		162–84			
National championship Conference title Conference division title or championship game berth
