= 2020 LIU Sharks football team =

Long Island University in the 2019 NCAA Division I FCS football season

2020 LIU Sharks football
- Conference: Northeast Conference
- Record: 2–2 (2–2 NEC)
- Head coach: Bryan Collins (23rd season)
- Offensive coordinator: Jim Cordle (1st season)
- Defensive coordinator: Rich Reichert (1st season)
- Home stadium: Bethpage Federal Credit Union Stadium

2020 Northeast Conference football standings
| | Conf. | | | Overall |
| Team | W | | L | W | | L |
|---|---|---|---|---|---|---|
| Duquesne y | 4 | – | 0 | 4 | – | 1 |
| Sacred Heart y$^ | 2 | – | 1 | 3 | – | 2 |
| LIU | 2 | – | 2 | 2 | – | 2 |
| Bryant | 2 | – | 2 | 2 | – | 2 |
| Wagner | 0 | – | 2 | 0 | – | 2 |
| Merrimack* | 0 | – | 3 | 0 | – | 3 |
Championship: Sacred Heart 34, Duquesne 27 (OT)
$ – Conference champion; y – Championship game participant; ^ – FCS playoff participant; Note: Due to COVID-19, the Northeast suspended the 2020 football season. * – Merrimack ineligible for NEC title and FCS postseason play due to transition to NCAA Division I Central Connecticut and Saint Francis (PA) opted out of the spring season.; Rankings from STATS Poll

The 2020 LIU Sharks football team represented both the LIU Post and LIU Brooklyn campuses of Long Island University in the 2020–21 NCAA Division I FCS football season. They were led by 23rd year head coach Bryan Collins and played their home games at Bethpage Federal Credit Union Stadium. They played as a second–year member of the Northeast Conference. This was the final season as head coach for Collins as he stepped down in June.

== Schedule ==
LIU had games scheduled against Delaware (September 19) and Lehigh (September 26), but canceled these games before the season due to the COVID-19 pandemic.

| Date | Time | Opponent | Site | TV | Result | Attendance |
|---|---|---|---|---|---|---|
| March 7 | 1:00 p.m. | Bryant | Bethpage Federal Credit Union Stadium; Brookville, NY | NEC Front Row | W 24–19 | 0 |
| March 14 | 1:00 p.m. | at Sacred Heart | Campus Field; Fairfield, CT | ESPN3 | L 7–35 | 400 |
| March 21 | 12:00 p.m. | at Duquesne | Rooney Field; Pittsburgh, PA | NEC Front Row | L 17–35 | 250 |
| March 28 | 12:00 p.m. | Merrimack | Bethpage Federal Credit Union Stadium; Brookville, NY | NEC Front Row | W 31–20 | 0 |
All times are in Eastern time
