= Jerry Schmitt =

American football player and coach (born 1960)

Current position
- Title: Head coach
- Team: Duquesne
- Conference: NEC
- Record: 141–97

Biographical details
- Born: September 16, 1960 (age 66); Pittsburgh, Pennsylvania, U.S.

Playing career
- 1979–1981: Westminster (PA)
- Position: Offensive lineman

Coaching career (HC unless noted)
- 1983–1984: West Allegheny HS (PA) (OL/DL/JV)
- 1985–1987: Duquesne (assistant)
- 1988: Avonworth HS (PA) (OL/DL)
- 1989: Bethel Park HS (PA) (OL/DL)
- 1990–1991: South Fayette HS (PA)
- 1992: Duquesne (assistant)
- 1993–1999: Duquesne (OC)
- 2000–2004: Westminster (PA)
- 2005–present: Duquesne

Head coaching record
- Overall: 169–118 (college)
- Tournaments: 1–3 (NCAA D-I playoffs)

Accomplishments and honors

Championships
- 3 MAAC (2005–2007); 8 NEC (2011, 2013, 2015, 2016, 2018, 2023, 2024, 2026)

Awards
- 2× NEC Coach of the Year (2018, 2023)

Jerry Schmitt (born September 16, 1960) is an American football coach and former player. He is currently the head coach at Duquesne University, a position he had held since the 2005 season. Schmitt served as the head coach at Westminster College in New Wilmington, Pennsylvania from 2000 to 2004. He is an alumnus of Westminster College, where he played as an offensive lineman on the football team. Prior to receiving the head coach position at Westminster, Schmidt was an assistant at Duquesne and a high school football coach in Pennsylvania.

== College career ==
After graduating from Pittsburgh’s Keystone Oaks High School in 1978, Schmitt played for Westminster College in Pennsylvania. As a senior in 1981, he led them to an undefeated regular season. In his time there, he was a three-year letterman.

== Coaching career ==
=== West Allegheny HS ===
Schmitt began his career as the offensive and defensive line coach while also coaching junior varsity basketball at West Allegheny High School.

=== Duquesne ===
Schmitt first joined Duquesne in 1985 as an assistant coach. His first stint lasted up until 1987.

=== South Fayette HS ===
In 1990, Schmitt landed the head coaching position at South Fayette High School after stints at other high schools. This was his first time being a head coach of a football team after years of being an assistant coach. His teams struggled that year, with South Fayette going 1–8–1, and the Beaver High girls' varsity team going 4–6.

The following year, the football team improved slightly, going 3–7. He resigned after that season, looking for other opportunities.

=== 1st Return to Duquesne ===
In 1992, Schmitt returned to Duquesne as an assistant coach. The following year, he was named offensive coordinator. In his time as Duquesne's offensive coordinator, they went 53–21.

=== Westminster ===
In 2000, Schmitt was named as Westminster College's new football head coach. In his time with Westminster, he had a record of 28–21 and saw the team transfer from Division II to Division III.

=== 2nd Return to Duquesne ===
However, COVID-19 issues scrapped the only game outside Big 12 play last season along with a bowl appearance.

Duquesne began the 2021 season with a 45–3 loss to the TCU Horned Frogs. They finished the season 7–3, and 5–2 in the NEC in 2021.

In 2023, Schmitt was named the NEC Coach of the Year, his second since 2018. That season, they went 6–1 in their conference and had an overall record of 7-4. With a win over Merrimac, they won the NEC title and qualified for the FCS playoffs. In the first round, they were defeated by the Youngstown State Penguins.

== Head coaching record ==
=== College ===
Year	Team	Overall	Conference	Standing	Bowl/playoffs
Westminster Titans (Presidents' Athletic Conference) (2000–2004)
2000	Westminster	8–2	N/A	N/A	
2001	Westminster	4–5	N/A	N/A	
2002	Westminster	6–4	4–1	2nd	
2003	Westminster	5–5	3–2	3rd	
2004	Westminster	5–5	2–3	4th	
Westminster:		28–21	9–6		
Duquesne Dukes (Metro Atlantic Athletic Conference) (2005–2007)
2005	Duquesne	7–3	4–0	1st	
2006	Duquesne	7–3	3–1	1st	
2007	Duquesne	6–4	2–1	1st	
Duquesne Dukes (Northeast Conference) (2008–present)
2008	Duquesne	3–7	2–5	6th	
2009	Duquesne	3–8	2–6	T–7th	
2010	Duquesne	7–4	5–3	3rd	
2011	Duquesne	9–2	7–1	T–1st	
2012	Duquesne	5–6	3–5	T–6th	
2013	Duquesne	7–4	4–2	T–1st	
2014	Duquesne	6–6	2–4	5th	
2015	Duquesne	8–4	5–1	1st	L NCAA Division I First Round
2016	Duquesne	8–3	5–1	T–1st	
2017	Duquesne	7–4	4–2	T–2nd	
2018	Duquesne	9–4	5–1	T–1st	L NCAA Division I Second Round
2019	Duquesne	6–5	4–3	T–3rd	
2020–21	Duquesne	4–1	4–0	1st	
2021	Duquesne	7–4	5–2	T–2nd	
2022	Duquesne	4–7	3–4	T–4th	
2023	Duquesne	7–5	6–1	1st	L NCAA Division I First Round
2024	Duquesne	8–3	5–1	T–1st	
2025	Duquesne	7–5	5–2	2nd	
2026	Duquesne	6–5	5–2	T–1st	
Duquesne:		141–97	90–48		
Total:		169–118			
National championship Conference title Conference division title or championship game berth
