= Mark Nofri =

American football coach

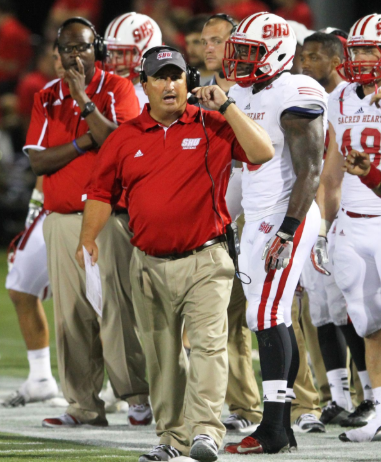

Current position
- Title: Head coach
- Team: Sacred Heart
- Conference: CAA
- Record: 82–73

Biographical details
- Born: c. 1970
- Education: Dean College; Keene State College (1993); Sacred Heart University

Coaching career (HC unless noted)
- 1993: Hamilton (assistant)
- 1994–1999: Sacred Heart (DB)
- 2000–2001: Sacred Heart (DC/ST/ILB)
- 2002–2011: Sacred Heart (AHC/DC/ST/ILB)
- 2012–present: Sacred Heart

Head coaching record
- Overall: 82–73
- Tournaments: 0–4 (NCAA D-I playoffs)

Accomplishments and honors

Championships
- 5 NEC (2013, 2014, 2018, 2020-21, 2021)

Awards
- 5× NEC Coach of the Year (2013, 2014, 2018, 2020, 2021)

Mark Nofri (born c. 1970) is an American college football coach. He is the head football coach for Sacred Heart University, a position he has held since 2012. He became the interim head coach in 2012, and was promoted to head coach on a permanent basis in 2013. Nofri led Sacred Heart to their first ever national ranking, as they were ranked No. 24 in The Sports Network poll on October 20, 2014. Nofri was diagnosed with colon cancer in 2015.

== Head coaching record ==
Year	Team	Overall	Conference	Standing	Bowl/playoffs	TSN/STATS^{#}	Coaches^{°}
Sacred Heart Pioneers (Northeast Conference) (2012–2023)
2012	Sacred Heart	2–9	1–7	9th			
2013	Sacred Heart	10–3	4–2	T–1st	L NCAA Division I First Round		
2014	Sacred Heart	9–3	5–1	T–1st	L NCAA Division I First Round		22
2015	Sacred Heart	6–5	3–3	T–3rd			
2016	Sacred Heart	6–5	1–5	T–5th			
2017	Sacred Heart	4–7	2–4	T–5th			
2018	Sacred Heart	7–4	5–1	T–1st			
2019	Sacred Heart	7–5	4–3	T–3rd			
2020–21	Sacred Heart	3–2	2–1	2nd	L NCAA Division I First Round		
2021	Sacred Heart	8–4	6–1	1st	L NCAA Division I First Round		
2022	Sacred Heart	5–6	3–4	T–4th			
2023	Sacred Heart	2–9	2–5	7th			
Sacred Heart Pioneers (NCAA Division I FCS independent) (2024–2025)
2024	Sacred Heart	5–6					
2025	Sacred Heart	8–4					
Sacred Heart Pioneers (Coastal Athletic Association Football Conference) (2026–present)
2026	Sacred Heart	0–1	0–1				
Sacred Heart:		82–73	38–38				
Total:		82–73					
National championship Conference title Conference division title or championship game berth
