= Sacred Heart University =

Catholic university in Fairfield, Connecticut, US

- Motto: Inspiring Minds, Unleashing Hearts
- Type: Private university
- Established: 1963; 63 years ago
- Accreditation: NECHE
- Religious affiliation: Catholic Church
- Academic affiliations: ACCU; NAICU; CIC
- Endowment: $356.8 million (2025)
- President: John J. Petillo
- Faculty: 802 (full-time and part-time)
- Undergraduates: 6,524
- Postgraduates: 4,206
- Location: Fairfield, Connecticut, United States; 41.2214°N 73.2419°W
- Campus: Suburban, over 300 acres (120 ha)
- Colors: Red and white
- Nickname: Pioneers
- Sporting affiliations: NCAA Division I – MAAC; EIWA; ECAC; AHA, EIVA; NEISA
- Mascot: "Big Red" the Pioneer
- Website: sacredheart.edu
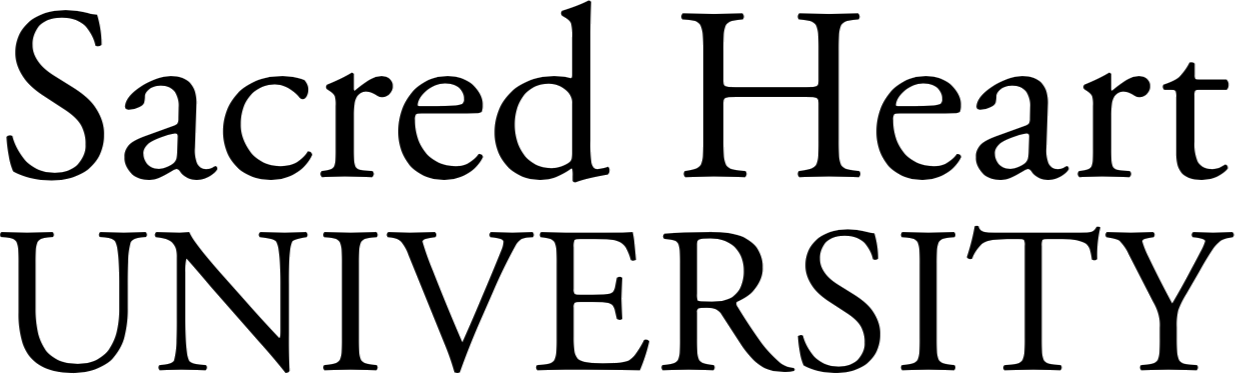

Sacred Heart University (SHU) is a private Catholic university in Fairfield, Connecticut, United States. It was founded in 1963 by Walter W. Curtis, bishop of the Diocese of Bridgeport, Connecticut.

Sacred Heart is the second-largest Catholic university in New England, behind Boston College. It offers more than 80 degree programs to over 8,500 students at the bachelor's, master's and doctoral levels.

== History ==
Sacred Heart University was founded in 1963 by Walter W. Curtis, bishop of the Diocese of Bridgeport on the grounds of the former Notre Dame Catholic High School. The university is led and staffed by the laity independent and locally oriented. The founding president was William H. Conley. Former American ambassador and diplomat Thomas Patrick Melady served as president of the university from 1976 to 1986.

Enrollment has risen from the original class of 173 to over 10,500 full and part-time undergraduate and graduate students, and the faculty has increased from 9 to 281 full-time professors and over 520 adjunct professors since 1963.

In 1990, Sacred Heart built the first dorms, and began accepting residential students. It now has 10 residential buildings with 50 percent of the full-time undergraduates residing in university housing.

The university has 32 varsity teams that compete in Division I. In 1997, The William H. Pitt Health and Recreation Center was opened.

In 1981, Vice President George H. W. Bush received an honorary degree from Sacred Heart.

In 2006, Jack Welch, former CEO of General Electric, made a financial gift to the university, and a College of Business was named after him.

In recent years, Sacred Heart University has purchased land in the surrounding Fairfield area, and has built new academic buildings and dormitories. In January 2023, the school completed construction of the hockey rink.

=== Recent history ===
On September 27, 2009, Sacred Heart University opened the Chapel of the Holy Spirit.

In 2010, Sacred Heart announced plans to open a new Health and Wellness Center. The center was built on Park Avenue across from the main campus.

In 2012, the university opened a new student commons building, named the Linda E. McMahon Student Commons, after McMahon donated $5 million to the university. The new Commons includes dining facilities, lounge space, and a bookstore.

In 2014, Sacred Heart broke ground for a new learning center, called the Student Success Center. The center provides educational support for students at the university and from the surrounding region. In 2015, the university started construction of the Center for Healthcare Education.

In 2015, the university opened the Frank and Marisa Martire Center for Business & Communications building, which houses the Jack Welch College of Business and the School of Communication & Media Arts. The building was designed Sasaki Associates, who also designed the Linda E. McMahon Student Commons.

In 2016, Sacred Heart opened a new residence hall, called Bergoglio Hall, named after Pope Francis, whose birth name was Jorge Bergoglio.

In October 2016, Nikki Yovino reported to the police that she was raped by two Sacred Heart University football players at an off-campus party. Yovino admitted, months later, that the sexual assault was a lie in an attempt to gain the attention of another man. In 2018, she pleaded guilty to two counts of second-degree falsely reporting an incident and one count of interfering with police. She was sentenced to one year in jail and three years of probation. The men Yovino accused, Malik St. Hilaire and Dhameer Bradley, were forced out of Sacred Heart University after losing their scholarships amid the false accusations. As of August 27, 2018, both men were no longer enrolled at Sacred Heart University, with no remediation for losing their scholarships.

In November 2016, Sacred Heart acquired the former GE corporate headquarters located near its main campus.

In April 2017, Sacred Heart and St. Vincent's College, another Catholic college in Connecticut, agreed to merge management operations. In 2018, the schools' merger was completed and St. Vincent's became known as St. Vincent's College at Sacred Heart University.

In 2019, Sacred Heart was ranked on Princeton Review's list of 385 best schools, including tenth for "Happiest Students".

Sacred Heart also announced in 2019 that it would renovate and reopen the Community Theater in downtown Fairfield.

In 2020, Sacred Heart announced plans to build a $60 million hockey arena.

Sacred Heart took over management of the nearby Discovery Museum and Planetarium as of January 2021.

== Academics ==
Academic rankings

National
- U.S. News & World Report: 209

The university consists of five colleges: College of Arts & Sciences, which includes the School of Communication, Media & the Arts and the School of Computing; Jack Welch College of Business and Technology; College of Health Professions; College of Nursing and the Isabelle Farrington College of Education. Sacred Heart University is accredited by the New England Commission of Higher Education.

The School of Communication, Media & the Arts is actively involved with local and legal journalism. It currently runs the Easton Courier and is actively involved with Fairfield County news. The school also funds and produces documentaries, namely Stolen Lives, Flyway of Life, and Ocean State: Rhode Island's Wild Coast.

Sacred Heart University offers more than 80 bachelor's, master's, and doctoral programs. Undergraduates may complete an undergraduate degree and a graduate degree within five to six years, depending on the degree program.

== Campus ==
The main campus is located in suburban Fairfield, Connecticut; 50 miles (80 km) northeast of New York City and 150 miles (240 km) southwest of Boston. The campus area first appeared as a census-designated place (CDP) in the 2020 Census with a population of 1,446.

The other campuses are:

- Center for Healthcare Education (Bridgeport, Connecticut)
- West Campus (Fairfield, Connecticut)
- Stamford Campus (Stamford, Connecticut)
- Griswold Campus (Griswold, Connecticut)
- Dingle, County Kerry Campus (Dingle, Ireland)
- WSHU Broadcast Center (Fairfield, Connecticut)

== Media ==
Sacred Heart University owns and operates both WSHU-FM and WSHU-AM, NPR-affiliated radio stations broadcasting out of Fairfield, Connecticut.

== Student life ==
Student body composition as of May 2, 2022
Race and ethnicity	Total
White	77%
Hispanic	12%
Black	4%
Asian	2%
Other (Note: Other consists of multiracial Americans & those who prefer to not say.)	2%
Foreign national	1%
Economic diversity
Low-income (Note: The percentage of students who received an income-based federal Pell grant intended for low-income students.)	16%
Affluent (Note: The percentage of students who are a part of the American middle class at the bare minimum.)	84%

=== Theatre Arts Program ===
The Theatre Arts Program began in 2009, with the premiere of Sacred Heart University's first musical production: Rent. Other productions have included Little Shop of Horrors in 2011, The 25th Annual Putnam County Spelling Bee in 2013, Sweeney Todd: The Demon Barber of Fleet Street in 2015, and Jesus Christ Superstar in 2017.

The Sacred Heart Theatre Arts program (TAP) produces six full-scale productions a year. Two are performed on the Edgerton main stage, two in the Little Theater, and two in the Black Box Theater.

The Theatre Arts Program has a student-produced, student-written, and student-performed festival called "Theatrefest". The program also has an improv team, "SHU’s Line Is It Anyway?". In 2016, the program began its own Repertory Theatre Company. Students are invited into this exclusive company beginning after their first semester. In 2017, Sacred Heart expanded its Theatre Arts Program by launching its National Playwriting Competition & Intern Program.

=== Student government ===
The Student Government consists of student leaders from all four class years. All full-time undergraduate students have the opportunity to be elected or appointed to a position.

=== The Spectrum ===
The Spectrum is a student-run newspaper printed and distributed to students each Wednesday and made available online.

=== Community service ===
More than 1,200 students and members of the faculty and staff volunteer in excess of 31,000 hours each year largely within the City of Bridgeport, but also regionally, nationally, and internationally.

=== Study abroad ===
Sacred Heart University has a residential study-abroad program in the Irish-speaking community of Dingle, County Kerry, Ireland. International experiences are available to students worldwide through programs located at The American University of Rome, in Italy, the University of Notre Dame in Fremantle, Australia, and the University of Granada, in Spain, as well as programs in Bermuda and the Bahamas.

The university allows students to participate in CCIS programs, programs affiliated with other schools across the U.S. These programs include, but are not limited to: France, Argentina, Germany, Belgium, and Japan.

=== Greek life ===
Sacred Heart is home to a total of seventeen fraternities and sororities.

Fraternity chapters include:

- Beta Theta Pi
- Kappa Sigma
- Phi Gamma Delta (FIJI)
- Pi Kappa Phi
- Delta Tau Delta
- Sigma Alpha Epsilon
- Sigma Chi

Sorority chapters include:

- Alpha Delta Pi
- Alpha Kappa Alpha
- Chi Omega
- Delta Delta Delta
- Delta Zeta
- Kappa Alpha Theta
- Kappa Delta
- Omega Phi Beta
- Phi Sigma Sigma
- Zeta Tau Alpha

== Athletics ==
The Pioneers compete in Division I of the National Collegiate Athletic Association (NCAA) in the Metro Atlantic Athletic Conference (MAAC), Atlantic Hockey America, Eastern College Athletic Conference (ECAC), Eastern Intercollegiate Wrestling Association (EIWA), and the Eastern Intercollegiate Volleyball Association (EIVA).

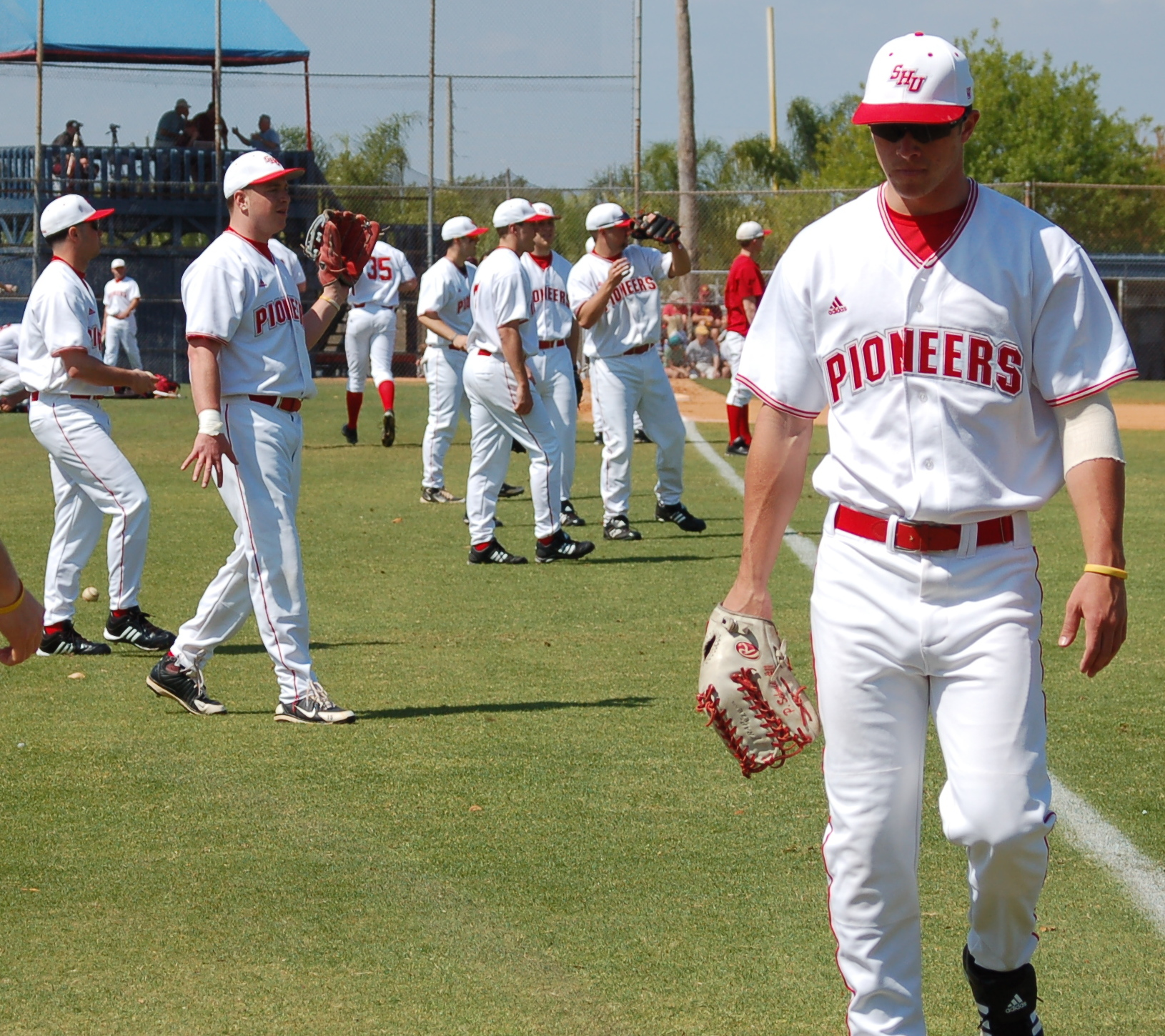
Sacred Heart Pioneers baseball players before a game in 2009

Nearly 800 students participate in the university's 33 athletic teams (18 female teams and 15 male teams), along with more than 500 students who participate in 23 club sports.

The football team plays at the Football Championship Subdivision level and claimed an FCS title in 2001. Their biggest rivalry is with the oldest public university in Connecticut, Central Connecticut State University, in what has been dubbed the Constitution State Rivalry.

The men's fencing team won the Northeast Conference title five years in a row (2010–2014) and was ranked #9 in 2011.

On February 21, 2013, the Sacred Heart University athletics department hired Major League Baseball player and manager Bobby Valentine as the athletic director.

The women's ice hockey program had competed as in independent from 2003 to 2019 at the National Collegiate level, with "National Collegiate" being the NCAA's official designation for championship events in sports in which members of Divisions I and II compete for a single national title. The Pioneers participate in the NEWHA, established in 2017–18 by Sacred Heart, fellow Division I member Holy Cross, and four Division II schools. Sacred Heart won the inaugural NEWHA tournament title in 2018. The NEWHA lost Holy Cross to Hockey East after that season, but returned to 6 members for 2019–20 with the arrival of LIU, a fellow NEC member that launched a new women's program. With the NEWHA soon to have the membership total required for an automatic bid to the NCAA women's tournament, the NEWHA formally organized as a conference in 2018, and received official NCAA recognition effective with LIU's arrival in 2019–20.

== Center for Christian–Jewish Understanding ==
Sacred Heart has played a role in interfaith dialogue and education between Christians and Jews. Interfaith centers in the U.S. began in 1953 at Seton Hall University, and have spread to 27 centers around the country, including the Center for Christian–Jewish Understanding of Sacred Heart which was established in 1992 as a research and academic division of the University under the direction of Anthony J. Cernera and Joseph Ehrenkranz.

By this time, Holocaust studies were well developed, and the CCJU branched out, creating forums for a national and international audience. This was also the year when the new Catechism of the Catholic Church was issued by Pope John Paul II, the first in four centuries, integrating the latest teachings of the Church with respect to Judaism. In the late 1990s, a strategy of using symbolic gestures was developed to further CCJU's educational goals, such as the 1996 establishment of the Nostra Aetate Awards Program, named after the 1965 Nostra aetate declaration of Vatican II which focused on the relationship that Catholics have with Jews. The award program recognizes individuals who have made significant contributions to interreligous dialogue and understanding. The first recipients of the award were Cardinal John O’Connor of the Archdiocese of New York and Connecticut Senator Joseph Lieberman.

in 2000, the Pope made a pilgrimage to the Holy Land, accompanied by leaders of the CCJU. The Vatican established diplomatic relations with Israel, and a new feeling of friendship and responsibility between Christians and Jews was in the air. The Center went on to organize a series of international conferences on understanding the Other, including 2006 publication of conference papers on What Do We Want the Other to Teach About Us? with responses from Jewish, Christian, and Muslim scholars. Other programs included Holocaust teacher education, lecture series, and other publications including the semiannual CCJU Perspective with national and international influence, and programs to support young religious leaders, visits to Krakow and Rome to establish a structure for interreligious dialogue that could be modeled worldwide.

== Notable alumni ==
=== Arts and entertainment ===
- Clavicular (attended but did not graduate) - online streamer and influencer
- Drew Denbaum - writer, actor, director, and educator
- Lydia Hearst-Shaw - model and actress
- Jeff LeBlanc - singer/songwriter
- Kevin Nealon - actor, Saturday Night Live cast member
- John Ratzenberger - actor
- Romeo Roselli - wrestler and actor

=== Business ===
- Suzanne Greco - former president and CEO of Subway
- Brian Hamilton - entrepreneur and philanthropist
- Jenna Sanz-Agero - singer and businesswoman at Netflix

=== Government and law ===
- Pat Boyd - Connecticut state representative
- Thomas W. Bucci - 49th mayor of Bridgeport, Connecticut
- Ramón Colón-López, USAF - fourth senior enlisted advisor to the chairman of the Joint Chiefs of Staff
- Carl Higbie - left after September 11 to join the Navy SEALs
- Carlo Leone - former Connecticut state senator
- Kathleen McCarty - former Connecticut state representative
- Douglas McCrory - Connecticut state senator
- Richard A. Moccia - former mayor of Norwalk, Connecticut
- Michael Pavia - businessman and former mayor of Stamford, Connecticut
- Felipe Reinoso - former Connecticut state representative and political candidate for the Congress of the Republic of Peru
- Gary Turco - connecticut State representative

=== Sports ===
- Keith Bennett (born 1961) - basketball player
- Jared Buchanan - ultra-marathoner
- Ginny Capicchioni - lacrosse player
- Julius Chestnut - football player
- Jon Corto - football player
- Justin Danforth - hockey player
- Jason Foley - baseball player
- Adam Fuller - college football coach
- Gordon Hill - football player
- Marc Johnstone - hockey player
- Matt Jones - soccer player
- Mark Nofri - football coach
- Troy Scribner - baseball player
- Zack Short - baseball player
- Alex Sobel (born 2000) - basketball player
- Josh Sokol (born 1997) - football player
- Ed Swanson - basketball coach
- Ryan Warsofsky (born 1987) - hockey player and coach

== Notable members of the board of trustees ==
- Brian Hamilton
- Patrick Maggitti
- Linda McMahon
