= Sacred Heart Pioneers football =

Intercollegiate American football team for Sacred Heart University

2026 Sacred Heart Pioneers football team
- First season: 1991; 35 years ago
- Athletic director: Judy Ann Riccio
- Head coach: Mark Nofri; 14th season, 82–72 (.532)
- Location: Fairfield, Connecticut
- Stadium: Campus Field (capacity: 3,334)
- NCAA division: Division I FCS
- Conference: CAA Football
- Colors: Red and white
- All-time record: 174–194 (.473)
- Playoff record: 0–4 (.000)
- Bowl record: 1–0 (1.000)

Conference championships
- NEC: 2001, 2013, 2014, 2018, 2020, 2021
- Consensus All-Americans: 3
- Website: sacredheartpioneers.com

The Sacred Heart Pioneers football program is the intercollegiate American football team for the Sacred Heart University located in Fairfield, Connecticut. The team competes in the NCAA Division I Football Championship Subdivision (FCS) level. In its most recent 2025 season, it was one of two NCAA Division I FCS independent schools. The school's first football team was fielded in 1991. The 2001 Sacred Heart Pioneers football team compiled a perfect 11–0 record and won the school's first conference championship. The team plays its home games at the 3,334-seat Campus Field.

The Pioneers started competing as an NCAA Division I FCS independent in 2024. Their departure from the Northeast Conference (now officially known as the NEC) coincided with the move of the Sacred Heart Pioneers athletic program to the Metro Atlantic Athletic Conference, which has not supported football competition since 2007. They joined the Merrimack Warriors football program, also joining the MAAC as a full member, as the only two schools competing in the 2024 NCAA Division I FCS football season independent of conference affiliation, and remained in that status in the 2025 season. On July 22, 2025, CAA Football announced Sacred Heart would be its newest football member and begin conference play in the 2026 season.

== History ==
=== Classifications ===
- 1991–1992: NCAA Division III
- 1993–1997: NCAA Division II
- 1998–present: NCAA Division I–AA/FCS

=== Conference memberships ===
- 1991–1992: NCAA Division III independent
- 1993–1994: NCAA Division II independent
- 1995–1996: Eastern Collegiate Football Conference
- 1997: Eastern Football Conference
- 1998–2023: Northeast Conference
- 2024–2025: NCAA Division I FCS independent
- 2026–present: CAA Football

== Notable former players ==
- E. J. Nemeth, York Capitals
- Jon Corto, Buffalo Bills
- Josh Sokol, Minnesota Vikings
- Julius Chestnut, Tennessee Titans

== Championships ==
=== Conference championships ===
Year	Coach	Conference	Record
2001	Jim Fleming	Northeast Conference	11–0
2013	Mark Nofri	Northeast Conference	10–3 †
2014	Mark Nofri	Northeast Conference	9–3 †
2018	Mark Nofri	Northeast Conference	7–4 †
2020	Mark Nofri	Northeast Conference	3–1
2021	Mark Nofri	Northeast Conference	6–1
Conference Championships			6

† denotes co-championship

== Playoff appearances ==
=== NCAA Division I ===
Sacred Heart has made four appearances in the NCAA Division I Football Championship playoffs. The Pioneers combined record is 0–4.

Year	Round	Opponent	Result
2013	First Round	Fordham	L 27–37
2014	First Round	Fordham	L 22–44
2020	First Round	Delaware	L 10–19
2021	First Round	Holy Cross	L 10–13

== Future non-conference opponents ==
Future non-conference opponents announced as of September 30, 2026.

2026	2027	2028	2030
at UMass (9/12)	at San Jose State (8/26)	at Morgan State (9/2)	at Akron (8/31)
Stonehill (10/10)	Morgan State (9/11)	Brown (9/16)	
at Merrimack (11/21)			
