= 2023 Celebration Bowl =

Postseason college football bowl game

2023 Cricket Celebration Bowl
- 8th Celebration Bowl
Howard Bison	Florida A&M Rattlers
(6–5)	(11–1)
MEAC	SWAC
26	30
Head coach: Larry Scott	Head coach: Willie Simmons
	Coaches / STATS; 5 / 10
	1	2	3	4	Total
Howard	14	2	0	10	26
Florida A&M	0	10	0	20	30
- Date: December 16, 2023
- Season: 2023
- Stadium: Mercedes-Benz Stadium
- Location: Atlanta, Georgia
- MVP: Kelvin Dean (RB, Florida A&M) & Isaiah Major (LB, Florida A&M)
- Favorite: Florida A&M by 6.5
- Referee: Christian Watson (Mountain West)
- Halftime show: Howard "Showtime" Marching Band and Florida A&M Marching 100
- Attendance: 41,108

United States TV coverage
- Network: ABC
- Announcers: Tiffany Greene (play-by-play), Jay Walker (analyst), and Quint Kessenich (sideline)

International TV coverage
- Network: Canada: TSN2; Brazil: ESPN Brazil
- Announcers: Matheus Pinheiro (play-by-play) and Rafael Belattini (analyst)

The 2023 Celebration Bowl was a college football bowl game played on December 16, 2023, at Mercedes-Benz Stadium in Atlanta, Georgia. The eighth annual Celebration Bowl featured the champions of the Mid-Eastern Athletic Conference (MEAC), the Howard Bison, and the champions of the Southwestern Athletic Conference (SWAC), the Florida A&M Rattlers. The game began at approximately 12:00 p.m. EST and was aired on ABC. Sponsored by Cricket Wireless, the game was officially known as the Cricket Celebration Bowl.

The SWAC and MEAC are the two NCAA Division I conferences of historically black colleges and universities (HBCUs). The Celebration Bowl thus serves as a de facto black college football national championship.

The Celebration Bowl was the only one of the 2023–24 bowl games involving teams from the Football Championship Subdivision (FCS). The NCAA structured a 24-team bracket tournament to determine a champion for the 2023 FCS football season. The 2023 Celebration Bowl was the first time the SWAC champions defeated the MEAC champions since the 2016.

== Teams ==
The game featured teams from the Mid-Eastern Athletic Conference (MEAC) and the Southwestern Athletic Conference (SWAC).

=== Howard Bison ===
Howard entered the game with a 6–5 record, 4–1 in conference play and tied with North Carolina Central atop MEAC standings. Howard qualified for the Celebration Bowl due to their regular-season win over North Carolina Central.

=== Florida A&M Rattlers ===
Florida A&M completed their regular season with a 10–1 record, 8–0 in conference play; their only loss was to South Florida of the Football Bowl Subdivision (FBS). The Rattlers then defeated Prairie View A&M in the 2023 SWAC Football Championship Game, contested on December 2, qualifying them for the Celebration Bowl.

== Game summary ==
Howard held a 14–0 lead after the first quarter, and a 16–10 lead at halftime. After no scoring in the third quarter, Florida A&M scored three touchdowns in the fourth quarter, while Howard was limited to a field goal and one touchdown, coming on a pick-six. Florida A&M's 30–26 victory marked only the second win by a SWAC team in the Celebration Bowl, the first having been by Grambling State in the 2016 edition.

2023 Cricket Celebration Bowl

Quarter	1	2	3	4	Total
Howard	14	2	0	10	26
No. 10 Florida A&M	0	10	0	20	30

at Mercedes-Benz Stadium • Atlanta, Georgia

- Date: Saturday, December 16, 2023
- Game time: 12:00 p.m. EST
- Game weather: N/A (indoor stadium)
- Game attendance: 41,108
- Referee: Christian Watson
- TV announcers (ABC): Tiffany Greene (play-by-play), Jay Walker (analyst), and Quint Kessenich (sideline)
- Box score

Game information

First Quarter

- (13:29) HOW – Jarett Hunter 8-yard run (Dylan West kick). Drive: 4 plays, 27 yards, 1:31. Howard 7–0
- (10:04) HOW – Kasey Hawthorne 3-yard run (Dylan West kick). Drive: 6 plays, 37 yards, 1:48. Howard 14–0

Second Quarter

- (13:30) FAMU – Terrell Jennings 3-yard run (Cameron Gillis kick). Drive: 9 plays, 46 yards, 5:13. Howard 14–7
- (9:37) HOW – DL Darrian Brokenburr tackled QB Jeremy Moussa in end zone for a safety. Howard 16–7
- (0:11) FAMU – Cameron Gillis 41-yard FG. Drive: 11 plays, 39 yards, 1:57. Howard 16–10

Third Quarter

No scoring

Fourth Quarter

- (13:45) FAMU – Kelvin Dean 21-yard pass from Jeremy Moussa (Cameron Gillis kick). Drive: 12 plays, 83 yards, 7:38. Florida A&M 17–16
- (10:58) FAMU – Kelvin Dean 53-yard pass from Jeremy Moussa (Cameron Gillis kick). Drive: 3 plays, 70 yards, 1:35. Florida A&M 24–16
- (7:55) HOW – Aaron Bickerton 40-yard FG. Drive: 6 plays, 43 yards, 3:03. Florida A&M 24–19
- (7:14) HOW – Carson Hinton 27-yard pick-six interception return (Dylan West kick). Howard 26–24
- (5:46) FAMU – Jah'Marae Sheread 38-yard pass from Jeremy Moussa (two-point conversion run failed). Drive: 4 plays, 66 yards, 1:28. Florida A&M 30–26

=== Statistics ===
Statistics	HOW	FAMU
First downs	11	19
Plays–yards	55–187	67–357
Rushes–yards	28–81	35–68
Passing yards	106	289
Passing: comp–att–int	14–27–3	19–32–2
Time of possession	27:12	32:48

Team	Category	Player	Statistics
Howard	Passing	Quinton Williams	14–27, 106 yards, 3 INT
Howard	Rushing	Eden James	12 carries, 55 yards
Howard	Receiving	Nah'shawn Hezekiah	3 receptions, 46 yards
Florida A&M	Passing	Jeremy Moussa	19–32, 289 yards, 3 TD, 2 INT
Florida A&M	Rushing	Terrell Jennings	19 carries, 68 yards, 1 TD
Florida A&M	Receiving	Kelvin Dean	3 receptions, 87 yards, 2 TD
