= 2023 Arkansas–Pine Bluff Golden Lions football team =

American college football season

2023 Arkansas–Pine Bluff Golden Lions football
- Conference: Southwestern Athletic Conference
- West Division
- Record: 2–9 (1–7 SWAC)
- Head coach: Alonzo Hampton (1st season)
- Offensive coordinator: Bobby Acosta (1st season)
- Offensive scheme: Multiple
- Defensive coordinator: David Calloway (1st season)
- Base defense: 4–3
- Home stadium: Simmons Bank Field

2023 Southwestern Athletic Conference football standings
	Conf.			Overall
Team	W		L	W		L
East Division
No. 11 Florida A&M xy$	8	–	0	12	–	1
Alabama State	5	–	3	7	–	4
Jackson State	5	–	3	7	–	4
Alabama A&M	3	–	5	5	–	6
Bethune–Cookman	2	–	6	3	–	8
Mississippi Valley State	1	–	7	1	–	10
West Division
Prairie View A&M xy	6	–	2	6	–	6
Alcorn State x	6	–	2	7	–	4
Southern	5	–	3	6	–	5
Grambling State	4	–	4	5	–	6
Texas Southern	2	–	6	3	–	8
Arkansas–Pine Bluff	1	–	7	2	–	9
Championship: Florida A&M 35, Prairie View A&M 14
$ – Conference champion; x – Division champion/co-champions; y – Championship game participant; Rankings from STATS Poll

The 2023 Arkansas–Pine Bluff Golden Lions football team represented University of Arkansas at Pine Bluff as a member of the Southwestern Athletic Conference (SWAC) during the 2023 NCAA Division I FCS football season. Led by first-year head coach Alonzo Hampton, The Golden Lions played home games at Simmons Bank Field in Pine Bluff, Arkansas.

== Schedule ==
Date	Time	Opponent	Site	TV	Result	Attendance
August 31	7:00 p.m.	at Tulsa*	Skelly Field at H. A. Chapman Stadium; Tulsa, OK	ESPN+	L 7–42	17,529
September 9	6:00 p.m.	vs. Tennessee State*	Simmons Bank Liberty Stadium; Memphis, TN (Southern Heritage Classic)	HBCU Go	L 14–24	32,518
September 16	4:00 p.m.	Miles*	Simmons Bank Field; Pine Bluff, AR	Golden Lions All-Access	W 21–20	8,215
September 21	7:00 p.m.	at Alabama A&M	Louis Crews Stadium; Huntsville, AL	ESPNU	L 24–31	5,317
September 30	4:00 p.m.	Southern	Simmons Bank Field; Pine Bluff, AR	Golden Lions All-Access	L 0–27	8,461
October 14	2:00 p.m.	at Mississippi Valley State	Rice–Totten Stadium; Itta Bena, MS	YouTube	L 17–42	8,752
October 21	2:00 p.m.	Alcorn State^{†}	Simmons Bank Field; Pine Bluff, AR	HBCU Go	L 7–31	13,469
October 28	2:00 p.m.	Jackson State	Simmons Bank Field; Pine Bluff, AR	ESPN+	L 14-40	5,113
November 4	2:00 p.m.	at Prairie View A&M	Panther Stadium; Prairie View, TX	HBCU Go	L 14-38	14,224
November 10	6:00 p.m.	Grambling State	Simmons Bank Field; Pine Bluff, AR	ESPNU	L 14–43	3,548
November 18	2:00 p.m.	at Texas Southern	Shell Energy Stadium; Houston, TX	HBCU Go	W 35–34	3,482
*Non-conference game; ^{†}Homecoming; All times are in Central time
