= 2023 Mississippi Valley State Delta Devils football team =

American college football season

2023 Mississippi Valley State Delta Devils football
- Conference: Southwestern Athletic Conference
- East Division
- Record: 1–10 (1–7 SWAC)
- Head coach: Kendrick Wade (1st season)
- Offensive coordinator: Eli Johnson (1st season)
- Defensive coordinator: Jesse Thompson (1st season)
- Home stadium: Rice–Totten Stadium

2023 Southwestern Athletic Conference football standings
	Conf.			Overall
Team	W		L	W		L
East Division
No. 11 Florida A&M xy$	8	–	0	12	–	1
Alabama State	5	–	3	7	–	4
Jackson State	5	–	3	7	–	4
Alabama A&M	3	–	5	5	–	6
Bethune–Cookman	2	–	6	3	–	8
Mississippi Valley State	1	–	7	1	–	10
West Division
Prairie View A&M xy	6	–	2	6	–	6
Alcorn State x	6	–	2	7	–	4
Southern	5	–	3	6	–	5
Grambling State	4	–	4	5	–	6
Texas Southern	2	–	6	3	–	8
Arkansas–Pine Bluff	1	–	7	2	–	9
Championship: Florida A&M 35, Prairie View A&M 14
$ – Conference champion; x – Division champion/co-champions; y – Championship game participant; Rankings from STATS Poll

The 2023 Mississippi Valley State Delta Devils football team represented Mississippi Valley State University as a member of the East Division of the Southwestern Athletic Conference (SWAC) during the 2023 NCAA Division I FCS football season. Led by first-year head coach Kendrick Wade, the Delta Devils played their home games at Rice–Totten Stadium in Itta Bena, Mississippi.

== Schedule ==
Date	Time	Opponent	Site	TV	Result	Attendance
September 2	3:00 p.m.	vs. Central State (OH)*	Soldier Field; Chicago, IL (Chicago Football Classic)	HBCU Go	L 21–24	9,330
September 16	6:00 p.m.	at Delta State*	McCool Stadium; Cleveland, MS	YouTube	L 7–35	5,176
September 23	3:00 p.m.	vs. No. 18 North Carolina Central*	Lucas Oil Stadium; Indianapolis, IN (Circle City Classic)		L 3–45	3,650
September 30	6:00 p.m.	No. 20 Florida A&M	Rice–Totten Stadium; Itta Bena, MS	YouTube	L 7–31	1,689
October 7	6:00 p.m.	at Prairie View A&M	Panther Stadium; Prairie View, TX		L 12–31	1,120
October 14	2:00 p.m.	Arkansas–Pine Bluff^{†}	Rice–Totten Stadium; Itta Bena, MS	YouTube	W 42–17	8,752
October 21	2:00 p.m.	Jackson State	Rice–Totten Stadium; Itta Bena, MS	ESPN+	L 6–21	10,000
October 28	2:00 p.m.	at Alcorn State	Jack Spinks Stadium; Lorman, MS	Braves All Access	L 3–24	7,789
November 2	6:30 p.m.	at Bethune–Cookman	Daytona Stadium; Daytona Beach, FL	ESPNU	L 7–20	4,380
November 11	2:00 p.m.	Alabama State	Rice–Totten Stadium; Itta Bena, MS	YouTube	L 3–20	2,326
November 18	6:00 p.m.	at Alabama A&M	Louis Crews Stadium; Huntsville, AL		L 21–30	3,607
*Non-conference game; ^{†}Homecoming; Rankings from STATS Poll released prior to the game; All times are in Central time
