= Alonzo Hampton =

Alonzo Hampton may refer to:

- Alonzo Hampton (defensive back) (born 1967)
- Alonzo Hampton (American football coach) (born 1973)
