= 2023 Alabama A&M Bulldogs football team =

American college football season

2023 Alabama A&M Bulldogs football
- Conference: Southwestern Athletic Conference
- East Division
- Record: 5–6 (3–5 SWAC)
- Head coach: Connell Maynor (6th season)
- Offensive coordinator: Duane Taylor (6th season)
- Defensive coordinator: Kienus Boulware (2nd season)
- Home stadium: Louis Crews Stadium

2023 Southwestern Athletic Conference football standings
	Conf.			Overall
Team	W		L	W		L
East Division
No. 11 Florida A&M xy$	8	–	0	12	–	1
Alabama State	5	–	3	7	–	4
Jackson State	5	–	3	7	–	4
Alabama A&M	3	–	5	5	–	6
Bethune–Cookman	2	–	6	3	–	8
Mississippi Valley State	1	–	7	1	–	10
West Division
Prairie View A&M xy	6	–	2	6	–	6
Alcorn State x	6	–	2	7	–	4
Southern	5	–	3	6	–	5
Grambling State	4	–	4	5	–	6
Texas Southern	2	–	6	3	–	8
Arkansas–Pine Bluff	1	–	7	2	–	9
Championship: Florida A&M 35, Prairie View A&M 14
$ – Conference champion; x – Division champion/co-champions; y – Championship game participant; Rankings from STATS Poll

The 2023 Alabama A&M Bulldogs football team represented Alabama A&M University as a member of the East Division of the Southwestern Athletic Conference (SWAC) during the 2023 NCAA Division I FCS football season. Led by sixth-year head coach Connell Maynor, the Bulldogs played their home games at Louis Crews Stadium in Huntsville, Alabama. The Alabama A&M Bulldogs football team drew an average home attendance of 12,934 in 2023.

== Schedule ==
Date	Time	Opponent	Site	TV	Result	Attendance
September 2	6:00 p.m.	at Vanderbilt*	FirstBank Stadium; Nashville, TN	SECN+/ESPN+	L 13–47	22,035
September 9	6:00 p.m.	Lane College*	Louis Crews Stadium; Huntsville, AL		W 51–13	13,175
September 16	6:00 p.m.	at Southern	Ace W. Mumford Stadium; Baton Rouge, LA	ESPN+	L 10–20	N/A
September 21	6:30 p.m.	Arkansas–Pine Bluff	Louis Crews Stadium; Huntsville, AL	ESPNU	W 31–24	5,317
September 30	2:00 p.m.	Tuskegee*^{†}	Louis Crews Stadium; Huntsville, AL	HBCU Go	W 58–3	26,391
October 7	4:00 p.m.	vs. Jackson State	Ladd–Peebles Stadium; Mobile, AL	ESPN+	L 30–45	19,107
October 14	3:00 p.m.	at Grambling State	Eddie Robinson Stadium; Grambling, LA	ESPN+	W 45–24	8,657
October 28	2:30 p.m.	vs. Alabama State	Legion Field; Birmingham, AL (Magic City Classic)	ESPN+	L 16–31	69,210
November 4	1:00 p.m.	No. 15 Florida A&M	Louis Crews Stadium; Huntsville, AL	ESPN+	L 28–42	16,179
November 11	12:00 p.m.	at Bethune–Cookman	Daytona Stadium; Daytona Beach, FL	HBCU Go	L 14–31	4,915
November 16	6:00 p.m.	Mississippi Valley State	Louis Crews Stadium; Huntsville, AL		W 30–21	3,607
*Non-conference game; ^{†}Homecoming; Rankings from STATS Poll released prior to the game; All times are in Central time

== Game summaries ==
=== at Vanderbilt (FBS) ===
Game One – Vanderbilt Commodores (FBS) (1–0) vs Alabama A&M Bulldogs (0–0)

Quarter	1	2	3	4	Total
Bulldogs	3	0	7	3	13
Commodores (FBS)	5	7	14	21	47

at FirstBank Stadium, Nashville, TN

- Date: Saturday, September 2, 2023
- Game time: 6:00 p.m. CST
- Game weather: Sunny • Temperature: 89 °F (32 °C) • Wind: S 4 miles per hour (6.4 km/h)
- Game attendance: 22,035
- Referee: Jason Autrey
- TV: SECN+/ESPN+

Game information

First quarter

- (6:05) AAM – Victor Barbosa 21-yard field goal (Drive: 20 plays, 71 yards, 8:55; Alabama A&M 3–0)
- (1:32) VAN – Jacob Borcila 23-yard field goal (Drive: 10 plays, 47 yards, 4:29; Tied 3–3)
- (0:33) VAN – TEAM 0-yard safety (Vanderbilt 5–3)

Second quarter

- (8:50) VAN – Will Sheppard 3-yard pass from AJ Swann, Jacob Borcila kick (Drive: 8 plays, 50 yards, 2:38; Vanderbilt 12–3)

Third quarter

- (12:18) VAN – Will Sheppard 17-yard pass from AJ Swann, Jacob Borcila kick (Drive: 6 plays, 75 yards, 2:42; Vanderbilt 19–3)
- (11:32) AAM – Terrell Gardner 62-yard pass from Xavier Lankford, Victor Barbosa kick (Drive: 2 plays, 73 yards, 0:40; Vanderbilt 19–10)
- (3:07) VAN – AJ Swann 1-yard run, Jacob Borcila kick (Drive: 8 plays, 57 yards, 3:54; Vanderbilt 26–10)

Fourth quarter

- (14:54) VAN – Sedrick Alexander 17-yard run, Jacob Borcila kick (Drive: 5 plays, 52 yards, 1:23; Vanderbilt 33–10)
- (11:32) VAN – Sedrick Alexander 9-yard run, Jacob Borcila kick (Drive: 2 plays, 19 yards, 0:45; Vanderbilt 40–10)
- (7:43) VAN – Kamrean Johnson 17-yard pass from Ken Seals, Jacob Borcila kick (Drive: 2 plays, 49 yards, 1:06; Vanderbilt 47–10)
- (2:32) AAM – Victor Barbosa 29-yard field goal (Drive: 10 plays, 63 yards, 5:11; Vanderbilt 47–13)

Win Probability

Line

- VAN –34.5

Over/Under

- 53.5

Statistics	AAMU	VAN
First downs	14	24
Total yards	278	461
Rushing yards	135	215
Passing yards	143	246
Turnovers	1	1
Time of possession	32:22	27:38

Team	Category	Player	Statistics
Alabama A&M	Passing	Xavier Lankford	11/22, 105 yards, TD
Alabama A&M	Rushing	Isaiah Nwokenkwo	1 carry, 39 yards
Alabama A&M	Receiving	Terrell Gardner	3 receptions, 83 yards, TD
Vanderbilt	Passing	AJ Swann	15/29, 194 yards, 2 TD, INT
Vanderbilt	Rushing	Sedrick Alexander	12 carries, 87 yards, 2 TD
Vanderbilt	Receiving	Jayden McGowan	6 receptions, 70 yards

=== No. 15 Florida A&M ===
	1	2	3	4	Total
No. 15 Rattlers	17	7	11	7	42
Bulldogs	14	7	0	7	28

Statistics	FAMU	AAMU
First downs	17	23
Total yards	348	339
Rushing yards	103	58
Passing yards	245	281
Turnovers	1	2
Time of possession	31:21	28:39

Team	Category	Player	Statistics
Florida A&M	Passing	Jeremy Moussa	14/27, 245 yards, TD, INT
Florida A&M	Rushing	Terrell Jennings	8 rushes, 40 yards
Florida A&M	Receiving	Jeremiah Pruitte	2 receptions, 82 yards
Alabama A&M	Passing	Quincy Casey	19/37, 280 yards, 2 TD, INT
Alabama A&M	Rushing	Donovan Eaglin	14 rushes, 61 yards, TD
Alabama A&M	Receiving	Jacolby Hewitt	6 receptions, 98 yards, TD
