= 2023 Florida A&M Rattlers football team =

American college football season

2023 Florida A&M Rattlers football

Black college national champion Celebration Bowl champion SWAC champion SWAC East Division champion

SWAC Championship Game, W 35–14 vs. Prairie View A&M

Celebration Bowl, W 30–26 vs. Howard
- Conference: Southwestern Athletic Conference
- East Division

Ranking
- STATS: No. 11
- FCS Coaches: No. 10
- Record: 12–1 (8–0 SWAC)
- Head coach: Willie Simmons (5th season)
- Offensive coordinator: Joseph Henry (2nd season)
- Offensive scheme: Spread
- Co-defensive coordinators: Brandon Sharp (3rd season); Ryan Smith (4th season)
- Base defense: 4–3
- Home stadium: Bragg Memorial Stadium

2023 Southwestern Athletic Conference football standings
	Conf.			Overall
Team	W		L	W		L
East Division
No. 11 Florida A&M xy$	8	–	0	12	–	1
Alabama State	5	–	3	7	–	4
Jackson State	5	–	3	7	–	4
Alabama A&M	3	–	5	5	–	6
Bethune–Cookman	2	–	6	3	–	8
Mississippi Valley State	1	–	7	1	–	10
West Division
Prairie View A&M xy	6	–	2	6	–	6
Alcorn State x	6	–	2	7	–	4
Southern	5	–	3	6	–	5
Grambling State	4	–	4	5	–	6
Texas Southern	2	–	6	3	–	8
Arkansas–Pine Bluff	1	–	7	2	–	9
Championship: Florida A&M 35, Prairie View A&M 14
$ – Conference champion; x – Division champion/co-champions; y – Championship game participant; Rankings from STATS Poll

The 2023 Florida A&M Rattlers football team represented Florida A&M University as a member of the East Division of the Southwestern Athletic Conference (SWAC) during the 2023 NCAA Division I FCS football season. Led by fifth-year head coach Willie Simmons, the Rattlers played home games at Bragg Memorial Stadium in Tallahassee, Florida. The Florida A&M Rattlers football team drew an average home attendance of 17,616 in 2023.

== Schedule ==
Date	Time	Opponent	Rank	Site	TV	Result	Attendance
September 3	3:00 p.m.	vs. Jackson State		Hard Rock Stadium; Miami Gardens, FL (Orange Blossom Classic)	ESPN	W 28–10	24,967
September 9	7:00 p.m.	at South Florida*	No. 23	Raymond James Stadium; Tampa, FL	ESPN+	L 24–38	36,495
September 16	6:00 p.m.	West Florida*	No. 23	Bragg Memorial Stadium; Tallahassee, FL	HBCU Go	W 31–10	17,953
September 23	6:00 p.m.	Alabama State	No. 22	Bragg Memorial Stadium; Tallahassee, FL	ESPN+	W 23–10	18,858
September 30	7:00 p.m.	at Mississippi Valley State	No. 20	Rice–Totten Stadium; Itta Bena, MS	YouTube	W 31–7	1,689
October 7	7:00 p.m.	at Southern	No. 19	Ace W. Mumford Stadium; Baton Rouge, LA	ESPNU	W 26–19	17,174
October 21	8:00 p.m.	at Texas Southern	No. 19	Shell Energy Stadium; Houston, TX	ESPN+	W 31–21	8,956
October 28	4:00 p.m.	Prairie View A&M^{†}	No. 16	Bragg Memorial Stadium; Tallahassee, FL	ESPNU	W 45–7	22,338
November 4	2:00 p.m.	at Alabama A&M	No. 15	Louis Crews Stadium; Huntsville, AL	ESPN+	W 42–28	16,179
November 11	6:00 p.m.	Lincoln (CA)*	No. 13	Bragg Memorial Stadium; Tallahassee, FL	Rattlers+	W 28–0	11,314
November 18	3:30 p.m.	vs. Bethune–Cookman	No. 11	Camping World Stadium; Orlando, FL (Florida Classic)	ESPNU	W 24–7	56,227
December 2	4:00 p.m.	Prairie View A&M*	No. 10	Bragg Memorial Stadium; Tallahassee, FL (SWAC Championship)	ESPN2	W 35–14	14,628
December 16	12:00 p.m.	vs. Howard	No. 10	Mercedes-Benz Stadium; Atlanta, GA (Celebration Bowl)	ABC	W 30–26	41,108
*Non-conference game; ^{†}Homecoming; Rankings from STATS Poll released prior to the game; All times are in Eastern time

== Rankings ==
Ranking movements Legend: ██ Increase in ranking ██ Decrease in ranking RV = Received votes т = Tied with team above or below
	Week													
Poll	Pre	1	2	3	4	5	6	7	8	9	10	11	12	Final
STATS	RV	23	23	22	20	19	18	19	16	15	13T	11	10	11
Coaches	25	21	24	23	18	16	16	18	14	13T	9	7	5	10

== Game summaries ==
=== Vs. Jackson State ===
	1	2	3	4	Total
Tigers	0	0	3	7	10
Rattlers	21	7	0	0	28

Statistics	JKST	FAMU
First downs	17	18
Total yards	303	358
Rushing yards	72	208
Passing yards	231	150
Turnovers	2	0
Time of possession	29:01	30:59

Team	Category	Player	Statistics
Jackson State	Passing	Zy McDonald	10/14, 149 yards, TD
Jackson State	Rushing	Irv Mulligan	16 rushes, 77 yards
Jackson State	Receiving	Rico Powers Jr.	4 receptions, 119 yards, TD
Florida A&M	Passing	Jeremy Moussa	12/22, 150 yards, 2 TD
Florida A&M	Rushing	Terrell Jennings	11 rushes, 75 yards
Florida A&M	Receiving	Jah'Marae Sheread	5 receptions, 90 yards, TD

=== At South Florida ===
	1	2	3	4	Total
No. 23 Rattlers	7	7	3	7	24
Bulls	14	10	7	7	38

Statistics	FAMU	USF
First downs	25	24
Total yards	393	342
Rushing yards	19	108
Passing yards	374	234
Turnovers	5	0
Time of possession	31:47	28:22

Team	Category	Player	Statistics
Florida A&M	Passing	Jeremy Moussa	24/43, 374 yards, TD, 3 INT
Florida A&M	Rushing	Jaquez Yant	8 rushes, 22 yards
Florida A&M	Receiving	Nicholas Dixon	6 receptions, 98 yards
South Florida	Passing	Byrum Brown	20/34, 197 yards, 3 TD
South Florida	Rushing	Michel Dukes	13 rushes, 40 yards
South Florida	Receiving	Naiem Simmons	3 receptions, 59 yards, TD

=== West Florida ===
	1	2	3	4	Total
Argonauts	0	3	0	7	10
No. 23 Rattlers	0	3	21	7	31

Statistics	WFLA	FAMU
First downs	17	20
Total yards	213	475
Rushing yards	79	169
Passing yards	134	306
Turnovers	1	0
Time of possession	32:01	27:59

Team	Category	Player	Statistics
West Florida	Passing	Peewee Jarrett	16/37, 134 yards, TD, INT
West Florida	Rushing	C. J. Wilson	12 rushes, 57 yards
West Florida	Receiving	K. J. Franklin	4 receptions, 42 yards
Florida A&M	Passing	Jeremy Moussa	18/27, 271 yards, 3 TD
Florida A&M	Rushing	Terrell Jennings	2 rushes, 79 yards, TD
Florida A&M	Receiving	Marcus Riley	4 receptions, 77 yards, TD

=== Alabama State ===
	1	2	3	4	Total
Hornets	0	3	7	0	10
No. 22 Rattlers	7	7	0	9	23

Statistics	ALST	FAMU
First downs	13	22
Total yards	303	353
Rushing yards	14	59
Passing yards	289	294
Turnovers	1	2
Time of possession	23:43	36:17

Team	Category	Player	Statistics
Alabama State	Passing	Damon Stewart	23/38, 289 yards, TD, INT
Alabama State	Rushing	Jawon Howell	12 rushes, 30 yards
Alabama State	Receiving	Kisean Johnson	8 receptions, 112 yards
Florida A&M	Passing	Jeremy Moussa	25/40, 294 yards, 2 TD
Florida A&M	Rushing	Jaquez Yant	7 rushes, 27 yards
Florida A&M	Receiving	Jah'Marae Sheread	9 receptions, 72 yards

=== At Mississippi Valley State ===
	1	2	3	4	Total
No. 20 Rattlers	10	0	7	14	31
Delta Devils	0	7	0	0	7

Statistics	FAMU	MVSU
First downs	17	12
Total yards	304	149
Rushing yards	128	80
Passing yards	176	69
Turnovers	1	1
Time of possession	23:46	36:14

Team	Category	Player	Statistics
Florida A&M	Passing	Jeremy Moussa	13/26, 155 yards, 2 TD, INT
Florida A&M	Rushing	Kelvin Dean	7 rushes, 48 yards
Florida A&M	Receiving	Marcus Riley	2 receptions, 99 yards, TD
Mississippi Valley State	Passing	Jamari Jones	7/17, 69 yards, TD
Mississippi Valley State	Rushing	Jared Wilson	18 rushes, 42 yards
Mississippi Valley State	Receiving	Kobe Chambers	4 receptions, 53 yards

=== At Southern ===
	1	2	3	4	Total
No. 19 Rattlers	0	16	0	10	26
Jaguars	6	6	0	7	19

Statistics	FAMU	SOU
First downs	27	15
Total yards	392	315
Rushing yards	67	125
Passing yards	325	190
Turnovers	1	1
Time of possession	34:54	25:06

Team	Category	Player	Statistics
Florida A&M	Passing	Jeremy Moussa	31/53, 325 yards, 2 TD
Florida A&M	Rushing	Terrell Jennings	7 rushes, 34 yards
Florida A&M	Receiving	Marcus Riley	7 receptions, 97 yards
Southern	Passing	J. R. Blood	11/19, 190 yards, TD
Southern	Rushing	Gary Quarles	13 rushes, 80 yards
Southern	Receiving	Chandler Whitfield	4 receptions, 88 yards, TD

=== At Texas Southern ===
	1	2	3	4	Total
No. 19 Rattlers	0	7	21	3	31
Tigers	7	7	0	7	21

Statistics	FAMU	TXSO
First downs	24	20
Total yards	435	314
Rushing yards	255	131
Passing yards	180	183
Turnovers	1	1
Time of possession	38:29	21:31

Team	Category	Player	Statistics
Florida A&M	Passing	Jeremy Moussa	17/32, 180 yards, 2 TD, INT
Florida A&M	Rushing	Kelvin Dean	9 rushes, 83 yards, TD
Florida A&M	Receiving	Jamari Gassett	3 receptions, 77 yards, TD
Texas Southern	Passing	Jace Wilson	16/29, 183 yards, 3 TD, INT
Texas Southern	Rushing	LaDarius Owens	19 rushes, 128 yards
Texas Southern	Receiving	Jyrin Johnson	4 receptions, 72 yards, TD

=== Prairie View A&M ===
	1	2	3	4	Total
Panthers	0	7	0	0	7
No. 16 Rattlers	14	7	10	14	45

Statistics	PV	FAMU
First downs	14	17
Total yards	220	453
Rushing yards	127	181
Passing yards	93	272
Turnovers	3	2
Time of possession	32:55	27:05

Team	Category	Player	Statistics
Prairie View A&M	Passing	Trazon Connley	9/24, 93 yards, TD, 3 INT
Prairie View A&M	Rushing	Caleb Johnson	10 rushes, 60 yards
Prairie View A&M	Receiving	Trejon Spiller	4 receptions, 54 yards, TD
Florida A&M	Passing	Jeremy Moussa	14/25, 272 yards, 3 TD, INT
Florida A&M	Rushing	Jaquez Yant	9 rushes, 63 yards
Florida A&M	Receiving	Jah'Marae Sheread	4 receptions, 76 yards, TD

=== At Alabama A&M ===
	1	2	3	4	Total
No. 15 Rattlers	17	7	11	7	42
Bulldogs	14	7	0	7	28

Statistics	FAMU	AAMU
First downs	17	23
Total yards	348	339
Rushing yards	103	58
Passing yards	245	281
Turnovers	1	2
Time of possession	31:21	28:39

Team	Category	Player	Statistics
Florida A&M	Passing	Jeremy Moussa	14/27, 245 yards, TD, INT
Florida A&M	Rushing	Terrell Jennings	8 rushes, 40 yards
Florida A&M	Receiving	Jeremiah Pruitte	2 receptions, 82 yards
Alabama A&M	Passing	Quincy Casey	19/37, 280 yards, 2 TD, INT
Alabama A&M	Rushing	Donovan Eaglin	14 rushes, 61 yards, TD
Alabama A&M	Receiving	Jacolby Hewitt	6 receptions, 98 yards, TD

=== Lincoln (CA) ===
	1	2	3	4	Total
Oaklanders	0	0	0	0	0
No. 13 Rattlers	7	14	7	0	28

Statistics	LCLN	FAMU
First downs	11	20
Total yards	171	236
Rushing yards	32	141
Passing yards	139	95
Turnovers	2	1
Time of possession	26:30	33:30

Team	Category	Player	Statistics
Lincoln	Passing	T. J. Goodwin	14/27, 139 yards, 2 INT
Lincoln	Rushing	Otis Weah	13 rushes, 31 yards
Lincoln	Receiving	Teriq Phillips	5 receptions, 69 yards
Florida A&M	Passing	Junior Muratovic	8/18, 82 yards
Florida A&M	Rushing	Terrell Jennungs	8 rushes, 53 yards
Florida A&M	Receiving	Nicholas Dixon	2 receptions, 25 yards

=== Vs. Bethune–Cookman ===
	1	2	3	4	Total
No. 11 Rattlers	7	10	0	7	24
Wildcats	0	0	7	0	7

Statistics	FAMU	BCU
First downs	17	17
Total yards	325	234
Rushing yards	175	122
Passing yards	150	112
Turnovers	0	3
Time of possession	29:28	30:32

Team	Category	Player	Statistics
Florida A&M	Passing	Jeremy Moussa	14/21, 150 yards
Florida A&M	Rushing	Terrell Jennings	8 rushes, 62 yards, 2 TD
Florida A&M	Receiving	Jah'Marae Sheread	5 receptions, 38 yards
Bethune–Cookman	Passing	Walter Simmons III	9/23, 79 yards, INT
Bethune–Cookman	Rushing	Jimmie Robinson III	21 rushes, 74 yards
Bethune–Cookman	Receiving	Daveno Ellington	2 receptions, 60 yards

=== Prairie View A&M (SWAC Championship) ===
	1	2	3	4	Total
Panthers	0	7	7	0	14
No. 10 Rattlers	14	7	7	7	35

Statistics	PV	FAMU
First downs	13	23
Total yards	274	448
Rushing yards	183	229
Passing yards	91	219
Turnovers	3	0
Time of possession	24:41	35:19

Team	Category	Player	Statistics
Prairie View A&M	Passing	Trazon Connley	7/14, 91 yards, INT
Prairie View A&M	Rushing	Christiful Herron	7 rushes, 70 yards
Prairie View A&M	Receiving	Trejon Spiller	3 receptions, 27 yards
Florida A&M	Passing	Jeremy Moussa	13/22, 188 yards, TD
Florida A&M	Rushing	Terrell Jennings	17 rushes, 113 yards, 2 TD
Florida A&M	Receiving	Marcus Riley	5 receptions, 132 yards, TD

=== Vs. Howard (Celebration Bowl) ===
	1	2	3	4	Total
Bison	14	2	0	10	26
No. 10 Rattlers	0	10	0	20	30

Statistics	HOW	FAMU
First downs	11	19
Total yards	187	357
Rushing yards	81	68
Passing yards	106	289
Turnovers	3	3
Time of possession	27:12	32:48

Team	Category	Player	Statistics
Howard	Passing	Quinton Williams	14/27, 106 yards, 3 INT
Howard	Rushing	Eden James	12 rushes, 55 yards
Howard	Receiving	Nahshawn Hezekiah	3 receptions, 46 yards
Florida A&M	Passing	Jeremy Moussa	19/32, 289 yards, 3 TD, 2 INT
Florida A&M	Rushing	Terrell Jennings	19 rushes, 68 yards, TD
Florida A&M	Receiving	Kelvin Dean	3 receptions, 87 yards, 2 TD
