= 2023 Alabama State Hornets football team =

American college football season

2023 Alabama State Hornets football
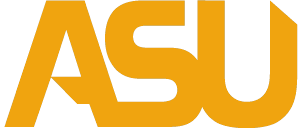
- Conference: Southwestern Athletic Conference
- East Division
- Record: 7–4 (5–3 SWAC)
- Head coach: Eddie Robinson (2nd season)
- Offensive coordinator: Harry Williams (2nd season)
- Defensive coordinator: Ryan Lewis Sr. (2nd season)
- Home stadium: New ASU Stadium

2023 Southwestern Athletic Conference football standings
	Conf.			Overall
Team	W		L	W		L
East Division
No. 11 Florida A&M xy$	8	–	0	12	–	1
Alabama State	5	–	3	7	–	4
Jackson State	5	–	3	7	–	4
Alabama A&M	3	–	5	5	–	6
Bethune–Cookman	2	–	6	3	–	8
Mississippi Valley State	1	–	7	1	–	10
West Division
Prairie View A&M xy	6	–	2	6	–	6
Alcorn State x	6	–	2	7	–	4
Southern	5	–	3	6	–	5
Grambling State	4	–	4	5	–	6
Texas Southern	2	–	6	3	–	8
Arkansas–Pine Bluff	1	–	7	2	–	9
Championship: Florida A&M 35, Prairie View A&M 14
$ – Conference champion; x – Division champion/co-champions; y – Championship game participant; Rankings from STATS Poll

The 2023 Alabama State Hornets football team represented Alabama State University as a member of the East Division of the Southwestern Athletic Conference (SWAC) during the 2023 NCAA Division I FCS football season. Led by second-year head coach Eddie Robinson, the Hornets played their games at New ASU Stadium in Montgomery, Alabama. The Hornets drew an average home attendance of 19,690 in 2023.

== Schedule ==
Date	Time	Opponent	Site	TV	Result	Attendance
September 2	5:00 p.m.	Southern*	ASU Stadium; Montgomery, AL	ESPN+	W 14–10	20,726
September 9	6:00 p.m.	Miles*	ASU Stadium; Montgomery, AL	YouTube	L 17–21	9,506
September 23	5:00 p.m.	at No. 22 Florida A&M	Bragg Memorial Stadium; Tallahassee, FL	ESPN+	L 10–23	18,858
September 30	5:00 p.m.	Alcorn State	ASU Stadium; Montgomery, AL	YouTube	L 20–23	14,355
October 7	2:00 p.m.	Bethune–Cookman^{†}	ASU Stadium; Montgomery, AL	HBCU Go	W 19–14	17,995
October 14	2:00 p.m.	at Jackson State	Mississippi Veterans Memorial Stadium; Jackson, MS	ESPN+	W 24–19	30,947
October 28	2:30 p.m.	vs. Alabama A&M	Legion Field; Birmingham, AL (Magic City Classic)	ESPN+	W 31–16	69,210
November 4	4:00 p.m.	vs. Grambling State	Ladd-Peebles Stadium; Mobile, AL	ESPN+	W 17–6	8,601
November 11	2:00 p.m.	at Mississippi Valley State	Rice–Totten Stadium; Itta Bena, MS	YouTube	W 20–3	2,326
November 18	2:00 p.m.	at Prairie View A&M	Panther Stadium; Prairie View, TX	ESPN+	L 14–21	1,350
November 23	2:00 p.m.	Tuskegee*	ASU Stadium; Montgomery, AL (Turkey Day Classic)	ESPN+	W 41–3	22,911
*Non-conference game; ^{†}Homecoming; Rankings from STATS Poll released prior to the game; All times are in Central time

The game against Southern, a fellow member of the Southwestern Athletic Conference, was played as a non-conference game and did not count in the league standings.
