= 2023 Jackson State Tigers football team =

American college football season

2023 Jackson State Tigers football
- Conference: Southwestern Athletic Conference
- East Division
- Record: 7–4 (5–3 SWAC)
- Head coach: T. C. Taylor (1st season)
- Offensive coordinator: Maurice Harris (1st season)
- Co-offensive coordinator: Jason Onyebuagu (1st season)
- Offensive scheme: Multiple
- Defensive coordinator: Jonathan Bradley (1st season)
- Base defense: 4–2–5
- Home stadium: Mississippi Veterans Memorial Stadium

2023 Southwestern Athletic Conference football standings
	Conf.			Overall
Team	W		L	W		L
East Division
No. 11 Florida A&M xy$	8	–	0	12	–	1
Alabama State	5	–	3	7	–	4
Jackson State	5	–	3	7	–	4
Alabama A&M	3	–	5	5	–	6
Bethune–Cookman	2	–	6	3	–	8
Mississippi Valley State	1	–	7	1	–	10
West Division
Prairie View A&M xy	6	–	2	6	–	6
Alcorn State x	6	–	2	7	–	4
Southern	5	–	3	6	–	5
Grambling State	4	–	4	5	–	6
Texas Southern	2	–	6	3	–	8
Arkansas–Pine Bluff	1	–	7	2	–	9
Championship: Florida A&M 35, Prairie View A&M 14
$ – Conference champion; x – Division champion/co-champions; y – Championship game participant; Rankings from STATS Poll

The 2023 Jackson State Tigers football team represented Jackson State University as a member of the East Division of the Southwestern Athletic Conference (SWAC) during the 2023 NCAA Division I FCS football season. Led by first-year head coach T. C. Taylor, the Tigers played home games at Mississippi Veterans Memorial Stadium in Jackson, Mississippi. The Jackson State Tigers football team drew an average home attendance of 30,060 in 2023.

== Schedule ==
Date	Time	Opponent	Site	TV	Result	Attendance
August 26	6:30 p.m.	vs. South Carolina State*	Center Parc Stadium; Atlanta, GA (MEAC/SWAC Challenge)	ABC	W 37–7	24,238
September 3	3:00 p.m.	vs. Florida A&M	Hard Rock Stadium; Miami Gardens, FL (Orange Blossom Classic)	ESPN	L 10–28	24,967
September 9	6:00 p.m.	at Southern*^{[note 1]}	Ace W. Mumford Stadium; Baton Rouge, LA	ESPN+	W 27–14	29,986
September 16	7:30 p.m.	at Texas State*	Bobcat Stadium; San Marcos, TX	ESPN+	L 34–77	24,118
September 23	6:00 p.m.	Bethune–Cookman	Mississippi Veterans Memorial Stadium; Jackson, MS	ESPN+	W 22–16	23,681
October 7	3:00 p.m.	Alabama A&M	Ladd–Peebles Stadium; Mobile, AL	ESPN+	W 45–30	19,107
October 14	2:00 p.m.	Alabama State^{†}	Mississippi Veterans Memorial Stadium; Jackson, MS	ESPN+	L 19–24	30,945
October 21	2:00 p.m.	at Mississippi Valley State	Rice–Totten Stadium; Itta Bena, MS	ESPN+	W 21–6	10,000
October 28	2:00 p.m.	at Arkansas–Pine Bluff	Simmons Bank Field; Pine Bluff, AR	ESPN+	W 40–14	5,113
November 4	2:00 p.m.	Texas Southern	Mississippi Veterans Memorial Stadium; Jackson, MS	ESPN+	W 21–19	22,819
November 18	2:00 p.m.	Alcorn State	Mississippi Veterans Memorial Stadium; Jackson, MS	ESPN+	L 24–28	42,791
*Non-conference game; ^{†}Homecoming; All times are in Central time

^{[note 1]}The game against Southern, a fellow member of the SWAC, was played as a non-conference game and did not count in the league standings.

== Roster ==
2023 Jackson State Tigers football team roster
Players
Coaches
Offense

Pos.	#	Name	Class
WR	1	Rico Powers	Jr
WR	2	George McCorley	GS
WR	3	Duke Miller	Jr
QB	4	Jason Brown	GS
RB	5	Irv Mulligan	GS
QB	6	Zy McDonald	Jr
WR	7	Seven McGee	Jr
RB	8	JD Martin	Sr
WR	9	Fabian McCray	GS
WR	10	Isaiah Kendall	Fr
WR	11	Isaiah Spencer	Fr
QB	12	Greyson Thompson	Sr
WR	13	Brandon Johnson	Jr
TE	14	Hayden Hagler	GS
QB	15	Jacobian Morgan	Jr
WR	16	Joanes Fortilien	So
WR	17	Errick Simmons	Jr
QB	18	Phillip Short	Jr
WR	19	Kobe Paul	Jr
RB	21	Desmond Moultrie	Jr
RB	27	Ahmad Miller	Fr
RB	31	Kevin May	Jr
RB	36	Ezequiel Johnson	Fr
TE	43	Jace Ward	Fr
TE	44	Kendarrius Smith	Jr
RB	49	Emari Matthews	So
OL	55	Douglas Fowler	Jr
OL	58	Cameron James	So
OL	61	Zyon Gilmore	So
OL	62	Almetrius Smith Jr.	Jr
OL	63	Christian Walker	Fr
OL	64	Deontae Graham	GS
OL	65	Jackson King	Fr
OL	67	Success Chikezie	Fr
OL	68	Josiah Roa	Jr
OL	69	Dequarious White	Fr
OL	70	Kirk Ford	GS
OL	71	Evan Henry	Sr
OL	72	Syr Riley	GS
OL	74	D'Andre Townes-Blue	Jr
OL	77	Chris Gonzales	Jr
OL	79	Quaveon Davis	Fr
TE	81	Jency Riley	Jr
WR	82	Lester Miller	Fr
TE	83	Sebastien Saint-Louis	Fr
WR	84	Mike Williams	Fr
WR	85	Andre Hunt	Sr
TE	86	DJ Stevens	GS
WR	89	Julian Smith	Jr
WR		Jaden Bossie	Fr
WR		Kierrie Conley Jr.	So
WR		Logan Mack	Jr
TE		Derek Scott	Fr
WR		Tayari Sherwood	So
RB		Jecomiah Walker	Fr

Defense

Pos.	#	Name	Class
LB	0	Allen Walker	GS
LB	2	Joshua Clarke	GS
CB	3	Jaheem Hazel	GS
S	4	Solomon Rogers	GS
CB	5	Ke'Vric Wiggins Jr.	Sr
S	6	Esaias Guthrie	So
S	7	Keydrain Calligan	Jr
CB	8	Jalin Hughes	Sr
S	9	B.J. Washington	So
S	10	John Huggins	GS
S	11	Tim Steward	GS
CB	12	Nireek Sharpe	Fr
LB	13	Isaac Peppers	GS
LB	15	Khalil Arrington	GS
CB	17	Emahd Dabney	Jr
S	19	Joe Perkins	Jr
DL	22	Antonio Doyle	Sr
LB	23	Javarian Jenkins	Jr
CB	24	Anthony Petty	Sr
CB	26	Tavarious Easley-Jones	Jr
S	28	Bruce Mitchell	Fr
CB	29	Frankie Dunn	Jr
LB	32	Noah Boulieu	Fr
DL	39	Phillip Webb	Jr
DL	40	Braxton Barney	Fr
LB	42	Jahman McNeil	Jr
S	46	Dazerick Patton	Jr
LB	47	Jackson Barry	Fr
DL	50	Charlton Goodell	Jr
DL	52	J. D. Granger	Jr
LB	53	J'Cori Hargon	Fr
LB	54	Ashton Taylor	So
DL	56	Athen Smith	GS
LB	57	Bryce Owens	Fr
LB	59	Bobby Ragas	So
DL	88	Coynis Miller Jr.	Sr
DL	90	Tru Thompson	Sr
DL	93	Zyon Walker	So
DL	94	Stanley Cooks	Fr
DL	95	Julius Reynolds	So
DL	97	Devonta Davis	Sr
DL	98	Tyas Martin	Jr
DL	99	Jeremiah Williams	So
S		John Brown III	Fr

Special teams

Pos.	#	Name	Class
K	35	Leilani Armenta	Fr
LS	37	Hunter Burns	Jr
K	38	Gerardo Baeza	Jr
K	38	Dylan Wasson	So
LS	41	Avery Salerno	So
K	48	Matt Noll	GS

Head coach

- T. C. Taylor

Coordinators/assistant coaches

- Otis Riddley (Tight ends)
- Maurice Harris (Offensive coordinator)
- Jason Onyebuagu (Co-offensive coordinator / Offensive line)
- Jonathan Bradley (Defensive coordinator / Defensive line)
- Bryson Abraham (Wide receivers)
- Quinn Billerman (Quarterbacks)
- TyQuan Hammock (Linebackers / Special Teams coordinator)
- Brandon Morton (Running backs)
- Mario Magana Jr. (Cornerbacks)
- Torenzo Quinn (Defensive backs / Defensive Passing Game coordinator)
- Jeff Weeks (Special Teams / Senior Defensive analyst)

Legend

- (C) Team captain
- (S) Suspended
- (I) Ineligible
- Injured
- Redshirt

Roster
Last update: December 7, 2024

== Game summaries ==
=== vs. South Carolina State ===
	1	2	3	4	Total
Tigers	7	10	17	3	37
Bulldogs	0	0	0	7	7

=== vs. Florida A&M ===
	1	2	3	4	Total
Tigers	0	0	3	7	10
Rattlers	21	7	0	0	28

Statistics	JKST	FAMU
First downs	17	18
Total yards	303	358
Rushing yards	72	208
Passing yards	231	150
Turnovers	2	0
Time of possession	29:01	30:59

Team	Category	Player	Statistics
Jackson State	Passing	Zy McDonald	10/14, 149 yards, TD
Jackson State	Rushing	Irv Mulligan	16 rushes, 77 yards
Jackson State	Receiving	Rico Powers Jr.	4 receptions, 119 yards, TD
Florida A&M	Passing	Jeremy Moussa	12/22, 150 yards, 2 TD
Florida A&M	Rushing	Terrell Jennings	11 rushes, 75 yards
Florida A&M	Receiving	Jah'Marae Sheread	5 receptions, 90 yards, TD

=== at Texas State ===
Jackson State Tigers at Texas State Bobcats – Game summary

Quarter	1	2	3	4	Total
Tigers	6	14	7	7	34
Bobcats	21	35	7	14	77

at Bobcat Stadium, San Marcos, Texas

- Date: September 16
- Game time: 7:30 p.m. CDT
- Game weather: Cloudy
- Game attendance: 24,118
- Referee: Marshall Lewis
- TV announcers (ESPN+): Brant Freeman, Keith Moreland, and Koral Riggs

Game information
First quarter
- TXST – Ismail Mahdi 56-yard run (Mason Shipley kick), 14:18. Bobcats 7–0. Drive: 2 plays, 71 yards, 0:35.
- TXST – Drew Donley 14-yard pass from T. J. Finley (Mason Shipley kick), 8:37. Bobcats 14–0. Drive: 10 plays, 76 yards, 3:56.
- JKST – Jason Brown 7-yard run (kick blocked), 4:35. Bobcats 14–6. Drive: 11 plays, 75 yards, 4:02.
- TXST – Jahmyl Jeter 15-yard run (Mason Shipley kick), 2:46. Bobcats 21–6. Drive: 5 plays, 66 yards, 1:43.

Second quarter

- JKST – Irv Mulligan 9-yard run (Matt Noll kick), 13:47. Bobcats 21–13. Drive: 11 plays, 85 yards, 3:52.
- TXST – Donerio Davenport 9-yard run (Mason Shipley kick), 13:01. Bobcats 28–13. Drive: 2 plays, 14 yards, 0:34.
- JKST – Irv Mulligan 4-yard run (Matt Noll kick), 11:11. Bobcats 28–20. Drive: 3 plays, 65 yards, 1:50.
- TXST – T. J. Finley 3-yard run (Mason Shipley kick), 9:48. Bobcats 35–20. Drive: 3 plays, 42 yards, 1:12.
- TXST – T. J Finley 6-yard run (Mason Shipley kick), 8:15. Bobcats 42–20. Drive: 4 plays, 59 yards, 1:18.
- TXST – Ashtyn Hawkins 27-yard pass from TJ Finley (Mason Shipley kick), 6:14. Bobcats 49–20. Drive: 1 play, 27 yards, 0:07.
- TXST – Kole Wilson 20-yard pass from TJ Finley (Mason Shipley kick), 0:24. Bobcats 56–20. Drive: 10 plays, 84 yards, 2:14.

Third quarter

- TXST – Jahmyl Jeter 3-yard run (Mason Shipley kick), 8:05. Bobcats 63–20. Drive: 8 plays, 84 yards, 3:10.
- JKST – Isaiah Spencer 9-yard pass from Zy McDonald (Mason Shipley kick), 2:48. Bobcats 63–27. Drive: 7 plays, 35 yards, 2:02.

Fourth quarter

- TXST – Malik Hornsby 24-yard run (Mason Shipley kick), 14:52. Bobcats 70–27. Drive: 7 plays, 84 yards, 2:50.
- JKST – Hayden Hagler 28-yard pass from Zy McDonald (Mason Shipley kick), 10:02. Bobcats 70–34. Drive: 10 plays, 64 yards, 4:41.
- TXST – Malik Hornsby 8-yard run (Mason Shipley kick), 6:48. Bobcats 77–34. Drive: 7 plays, 60 yards, 3:07.

Statistics	JKST	TXST
First downs	23	34
Total yards	400	684
Rushing yards	118	399
Passing yards	282	285
Turnovers	1	1
Time of possession	34:46	25:14

Team	Category	Player	Statistics
Jackson State	Passing	Jason Brown	16/26, 209 yards, INT
Jackson State	Rushing	Ahmad Miller	13 rushes, 98 yards
Jackson State	Receiving	Kobe Paul	2 receptions, 54 yards
Texas State	Passing	T. J. Finley	17/21, 251 yards, 3 TD
Texas State	Rushing	Malik Hornsby	10 rushes, 133 yards, 2 TD
Texas State	Receiving	Drew Donley	3 receptions, 83 yards, TD
