= 2023 Prairie View A&M Panthers football team =

American college football season

2023 Prairie View A&M Panthers football
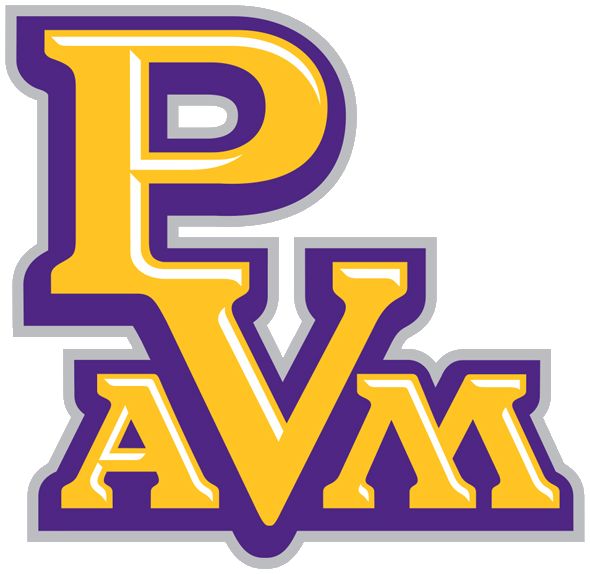

SWAC West Division co-champion

SWAC Championship Game, L 14–35 at Florida A&M
- Conference: Southwestern Athletic Conference
- West Division
- Record: 6–6 (6–2 SWAC)
- Head coach: Bubba McDowell (2nd season)
- Offensive coordinator: Mark Frederick (2nd season)
- Defensive coordinator: Todd Middleton (2nd season)
- Home stadium: Panther Stadium at Blackshear Field

2023 Southwestern Athletic Conference football standings
	Conf.			Overall
Team	W		L	W		L
East Division
No. 11 Florida A&M xy$	8	–	0	12	–	1
Alabama State	5	–	3	7	–	4
Jackson State	5	–	3	7	–	4
Alabama A&M	3	–	5	5	–	6
Bethune–Cookman	2	–	6	3	–	8
Mississippi Valley State	1	–	7	1	–	10
West Division
Prairie View A&M xy	6	–	2	6	–	6
Alcorn State x	6	–	2	7	–	4
Southern	5	–	3	6	–	5
Grambling State	4	–	4	5	–	6
Texas Southern	2	–	6	3	–	8
Arkansas–Pine Bluff	1	–	7	2	–	9
Championship: Florida A&M 35, Prairie View A&M 14
$ – Conference champion; x – Division champion/co-champions; y – Championship game participant; Rankings from STATS Poll

The 2023 Prairie View A&M Panthers football team represented Prairie View A&M University as a member of the West Division of Southwestern Athletic Conference (SWAC) during the 2023 NCAA Division I FCS football season. Led by first-year head coach Bubba McDowell, Prairie View A&M played their home games at Panther Stadium at Blackshear Field in Prairie View, Texas.

== Schedule ==
Date	Time	Opponent	Site	TV	Result	Attendance
September 2	7:00 p.m.	at Texas Southern	Shell Energy Stadium; Houston, TX (Labor Day Classic)	ESPN+	W 37–34 ^{OT}	18,271
September 9	6:00 p.m.	Abilene Christian*	Panther Stadium; Prairie View, TX		L 16–45	5,774
September 16	6:00 p.m.	at SMU*	Gerald J. Ford Stadium; Dallas, TX	ESPN+	L 0–69	24,489
September 23	6:00 p.m.	at Alcorn State	Jack Spinks Stadium; Lorman, MS		W 23–20	14,645
September 30	6:00 p.m.	vs. Grambling State	Cotton Bowl; Dallas, TX (State Fair Classic)	ESPN+	L 20–35	52,389
October 7	6:00 p.m.	at Mississippi Valley State	Jack Spinks Stadium; Lorman, MS		W 31–12	2,898
October 14	6:00 p.m.	at Houston Christian*	Husky Stadium; Houston, TX	ESPN+	L 0–30	2,112
October 28	4:00 p.m.	at No. 16 Florida A&M	Bragg Memorial Stadium; Tallahassee, FL	ESPNU	L 7–45	22,338
November 4	2:00 p.m.	Arkansas–Pine Bluff^{†}	Panther Stadium; Prairie View, TX	HBCU Go	W 38–14	14,224
November 11	2:00 p.m.	at Southern	Ace W. Mumford Stadium; Baton Rouge, LA	ESPN+	W 27–21	16,470
November 18	2:00 p.m.	Alabama State	Panther Stadium; Prairie View, TX	ESPN+	W 21–14	1,350
December 2	4:00 p.m.	at No. 10 Florida A&M*	Bragg Memorial Stadium; Tallahassee, FL (SWAC Championship)	ESPN2	L 14–35	14,628
*Non-conference game; ^{†}Homecoming; Rankings from STATS Poll released prior to the game; All times are in Central time

== Game summaries ==
=== At Texas Southern ===
	1	2	3	4	OT	Total
Panthers	14	3	7	10	3	37
Tigers	3	14	17	0	0	34

Statistics	PV	TXSO
First downs	27	20
Total yards	455	486
Rushing yards	180	200
Passing yards	275	286
Turnovers	2	4
Time of possession	35:51	24:09

Team	Category	Player	Statistics
Prairie View A&M	Passing	Trazon Connley	20/33, 275 yards, 2 TD, INT
Prairie View A&M	Rushing	Ahmad Antoine	18 rushes, 89 yards
Prairie View A&M	Receiving	Jahquan Bloomfield	2 receptions, 76 yards, TD
Texas Southern	Passing	Andrew Body	18/38, 286 yards, 3 TD, 3 INT
Texas Southern	Rushing	LaDarius Owens	8 rushes, 104 yards, TD
Texas Southern	Receiving	Quay Davis	7 receptions, 120 yards, TD

=== Abilene Christian ===
	1	2	3	4	Total
Wildcats	21	10	14	0	45
Panthers	7	0	0	9	16

Statistics	ACU	PV
First downs	15	27
Total yards	400	533
Rushing yards	86	299
Passing yards	314	234
Turnovers	2	3
Time of possession	21:30	38:30

Team	Category	Player	Statistics
Abilene Christian	Passing	Maverick McIvor	12/19, 314 yards, 4 TD
Abilene Christian	Rushing	Jermiah Dobbins	8 rushes, 42 yards
Abilene Christian	Receiving	Blayne Taylor	3 receptions, 136 yards, TD
Prairie View A&M	Passing	Trazon Connley	13/24, 190 yards, INT
Prairie View A&M	Rushing	Ahmad Antoine	16 rushes, 103 yards
Prairie View A&M	Receiving	Brian Jenkins Jr.	4 receptions, 98 yards

=== At SMU ===
	1	2	3	4	Total
Panthers	0	0	0	0	0
Mustangs	14	28	21	6	69

Statistics	PV	SMU
First downs	10	28
Total yards	156	566
Rushing yards	94	177
Passing yards	62	389
Turnovers	0	1
Time of possession	34:14	25:46

Team	Category	Player	Statistics
Prairie View A&M	Passing	Trazon Connley	6/14, 51 yards
Prairie View A&M	Rushing	Ronald Young Jr.	7 rushes, 32 yards
Prairie View A&M	Receiving	Khristopher Simmons	3 receptions, 25 yards
SMU	Passing	Preston Stone	15/20, 300 yards, 5 TD, INT
SMU	Rushing	Camar Wheaton	16 rushes, 75 yards, TD
SMU	Receiving	Roderick Daniels Jr.	3 receptions, 96 yards, TD

=== At No. 16 Florida A&M ===
	1	2	3	4	Total
Panthers	0	7	0	0	7
No. 16 Rattlers	14	7	10	14	45

Statistics	PV	FAMU
First downs	14	17
Total yards	220	453
Rushing yards	127	181
Passing yards	93	272
Turnovers	3	2
Time of possession	32:55	27:05

Team	Category	Player	Statistics
Prairie View A&M	Passing	Trazon Connley	9/24, 93 yards, TD, 3 INT
Prairie View A&M	Rushing	Caleb Johnson	10 rushes, 60 yards
Prairie View A&M	Receiving	Trejon Spiller	4 receptions, 54 yards, TD
Florida A&M	Passing	Jeremy Moussa	14/25, 272 yards, 3 TD, INT
Florida A&M	Rushing	Jaquez Yant	9 rushes, 63 yards
Florida A&M	Receiving	Jah'Marae Sheread	4 receptions, 76 yards, TD

=== At No. 10 Florida A&M (SWAC Championship) ===
	1	2	3	4	Total
Panthers	0	7	7	0	14
No. 10 Rattlers	14	7	7	7	35

Statistics	PV	FAMU
First downs	13	23
Total yards	274	448
Rushing yards	183	229
Passing yards	91	219
Turnovers	3	0
Time of possession	24:41	35:19

Team	Category	Player	Statistics
Prairie View A&M	Passing	Trazon Connley	7/14, 91 yards, INT
Prairie View A&M	Rushing	Christiful Herron	7 rushes, 70 yards
Prairie View A&M	Receiving	Trejon Spiller	3 receptions, 27 yards
Florida A&M	Passing	Jeremy Moussa	13/22, 188 yards, TD
Florida A&M	Rushing	Terrell Jennings	17 rushes, 113 yards, 2 TD
Florida A&M	Receiving	Marcus Riley	5 receptions, 132 yards, TD
