= 2023 Alcorn State Braves football team =

American college football season

2023 Alcorn State Braves football
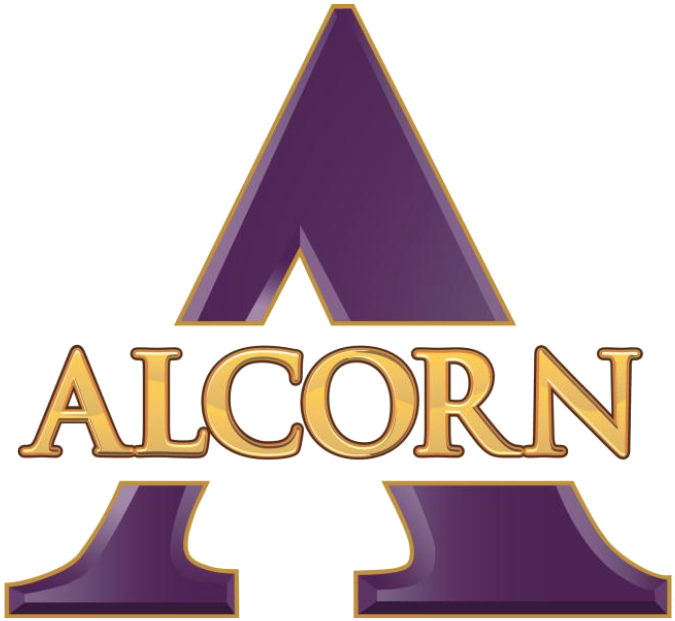

SWAC West Division co-champion
- Conference: Southwestern Athletic Conference
- West Division
- Record: 7–4 (6–2 SWAC)
- Head coach: Fred McNair (7th season)
- Offensive coordinator: Elliott Wratten (4th season)
- Defensive coordinator: Cedric Thomas (2nd season)
- Home stadium: Casem-Spinks Stadium

2023 Southwestern Athletic Conference football standings
	Conf.			Overall
Team	W		L	W		L
East Division
No. 11 Florida A&M xy$	8	–	0	12	–	1
Alabama State	5	–	3	7	–	4
Jackson State	5	–	3	7	–	4
Alabama A&M	3	–	5	5	–	6
Bethune–Cookman	2	–	6	3	–	8
Mississippi Valley State	1	–	7	1	–	10
West Division
Prairie View A&M xy	6	–	2	6	–	6
Alcorn State x	6	–	2	7	–	4
Southern	5	–	3	6	–	5
Grambling State	4	–	4	5	–	6
Texas Southern	2	–	6	3	–	8
Arkansas–Pine Bluff	1	–	7	2	–	9
Championship: Florida A&M 35, Prairie View A&M 14
$ – Conference champion; x – Division champion/co-champions; y – Championship game participant; Rankings from STATS Poll

The 2023 Alcorn State Braves football team represented Alcorn State University as a member of the Southwestern Athletic Conference (SWAC) during the 2023 NCAA Division I FCS football season. They were led by head coach Fred McNair, who is coaching in his seventh season with the program. The Braves played home games at Casem-Spinks Stadium in Lorman, Mississippi. The Alcorn State Braves football team drew an average home attendance of 12,018 in 2023.

== Schedule ==
Date	Time	Opponent	Site	TV	Result	Attendance
September 2	6:00 p.m.	at Southern Miss*	M. M. Roberts Stadium; Hattiesburg, MS	ESPN+	L 14–40	30,335
September 9	6:00 p.m.	at Stephen F. Austin*	Homer Bryce Stadium; Nacogdoches, TX	ESPN+	L 10–38	7,844
September 16	6:00 p.m.	McNeese*	Jack Spinks Stadium; Lorman, MS	Braves All Access	W 17–3	2,052
September 23	6:00 p.m.	Prairie View A&M	Jack Spinks Stadium; Lorman, MS	Braves All Access	L 20–23	14,645
September 30	5:00 p.m.	at Alabama State	ASU Stadium; Montgomery, AL		W 23–20	14,355
October 7	2:30 p.m.	Grambling State^{†}	Jack Spinks Stadium; Lorman, MS	ESPN+	W 25–24	21,012
October 21	2:00 p.m.	at Arkansas–Pine Bluff	Simmons Bank Field; Pine Bluff, AR	HBCU Go	W 31–7	13,469
October 28	2:00 p.m.	Mississippi Valley State	Jack Spinks Stadium; Lorman, MS	Braves All Access	W 24–3	7,789
November 4	2:00 p.m.	Southern	Jack Spinks Stadium; Lorman, MS	ESPN+	W 44–21	14,592
November 12	2:00 p.m.	at Texas Southern	Shell Energy Stadium; Houston, TX	ESPN+	L 10–44	3,987
November 18	2:00 p.m.	at Jackson State	Mississippi Veterans Memorial Stadium; Jackson, MS	ESPN+	W 28–24	42,791
*Non-conference game; ^{†}Homecoming; All times are in Central time

== Game summaries ==
=== at Southern Miss ===
Game One – Alcorn State Braves (0–0) at Southern Miss Golden Eagles (0–0) – Game summary

Quarter	1	2	3	4	Total
Braves	7	0	0	7	14
Golden Eagles	17	10	10	3	40

at M.M. Roberts Stadium, Hattiesburg, MS

- Date: Saturday, September 2, 2023
- Game time: 6:00 p.m. CDT
- Game weather: Cloudy • Temperature: 86 °F (30 °C) • Wind: E 4 mph
- Game attendance: 30,335
- Referee: Trennis Livingston
- TV announcers (ESPN+): TBD

Game information

First quarter

- (12:53) USM - Jakarius Caston 16-yard pass from Billy Wiles, Andrew Stein Kick (Drive: 3 plays, 53 yards, 1:25; USM 7-0)
- (7:34) USM - Frank Gore Jr. 9-yard run, Andrew Stein kick (Drive: 7 plays, 63 yards, 3:33; USM 14-0)
- (4:03) USM - Andrew Stein 45-yard field goal (Drive: 6 plays, 17 yards, 2:23; USM 17-0)
- (3:50) ALCN - Tyler Macon 75-yard run, Noah Kiani kick (Drive: 1 play, 75 yards, 0:13; 'USM 17-7)

Second quarter

- (10:56) USM - Frank Gore Jr. 2-yard pass from Billy Wiles, Andrew Stein kick (Drive: 14 plays, 65 yards, 7:54; USM 24-7)
- (0:30) USM - Andrew Stein 23-yard field goal (Drive: 8 plays, 64 yards, 4:21; USM 27-7)

Third quarter

- (9:35) USM - Andrew Stein 52-yard field goal (Drive: 6 plays, 0 yards, 2:57; USM 30-7)
- (4:31) USM - Tyquan Henderson 3-yard pass from Billy Wiles, Andrew Stein kick (Drive: 8 plays, 79 yards, 3:39; USM 37-7)

Fourth quarter

- (9:08) ALCN - Niko Duffey 15-yard run, Noah Kiani kick (Drive: 8 plays, 72 yards, 4:22; USM 37-14)
- (4:26) USM - Andrew Stein 41-yard field goal (Drive: 8 plays, 51 yards, 4:36; USM 40-14)

Statistics	ALCN	USM
First downs	8	25
Total yards	226	441
Rushing yards	182	145
Passing yards	44	296
Turnovers	2	1
Time of possession	21:43	38:17

Team	Category	Player	Statistics
Alcorn State	Passing	Aaron Allen	5/9, 44 yards
Alcorn State	Rushing	Tyler Macon	4 carries, 83 yards, 1 TD
Alcorn State	Receiving	Malik Rodgers	1 reception, 26 yards
Southern Miss	Passing	Billy Wiles	21/28, 267 yards, 3 TD, 1 INT
Southern Miss	Rushing	Rodrigues Clark	9 carries, 54 yards
Southern Miss	Receiving	Jakarius Caston	5 receptions, 104 yards, 1 TD
