= Kendrick Wade =

American football coach

Current position
- Title: Head coach
- Team: Ripley High School

Biographical details
- Born: Cleveland, Mississippi, U.S.

Playing career
- 2001–2002: Coahoma
- 2003–2005: Mississippi Valley State
- Position: Wide receiver

Coaching career (HC unless noted)
- 2010–2013: Fairview Middle (TN)
- 2017–2018: Mississippi Valley State (WR)
- 2019: Briar Cliff (WR)
- 2020–2021: Fort Valley State (WR/PGC)
- 2022: Delta State (WR/PGC)
- 2023–2024: Mississippi Valley State
- 2025–present: Ripley High School (TN)

Administrative career (AD unless noted)
- 2014–2017: Maxine Smith STEAM Academy

Head coaching record
- Overall: 2–21

Kendrick J. Wade is an American football coach and former wide receiver who currently serves as the head football coach at Ripley High School in Ripley, Tennessee. He previously worked as an offensive analyst with the Memphis Tigers in 2025. Wade was the head football coach at Mississippi Valley State University from 2023 to 2024. He played college football at Coahoma Community College from 2001 to 2002 and at Mississippi Valley State from 2003 to 2005, and later played professionally for four seasons from 2006 to 2009.

== Head coaching record ==
Year	Team	Overall	Conference	Standing	Bowl/playoffs
Mississippi Valley State Delta Devils (Southwestern Athletic Conference) (2023–2024)
2023	Mississippi Valley State	1–10	1–7	6th (East)	
2024	Mississippi Valley State	1–11	1–7	6th (East)	
Mississippi Valley State:		2–21	2–14		
Total:		2–21			
National championship Conference title Conference division title or championship game berth
^{†}Indicates Bowl Coalition, Bowl Alliance, BCS, or CFP / New Years' Six bowl.; ^{#}Rankings from final Coaches Poll.
