= Lincoln Oaklanders football =

American college football program

- First season: 2021
- Last season: 2025
- Athletic director: Desmond Gumbs
- Head coach: Desmond Gumbs; 5th season, 3–47 (.060)
- Location: Oakland, California
- Stadium: None
- Conference: Independent
- All-time record: 3–47 (.060)

Conference championships
- None
- Marching band: Oaklander Marching Band

The Lincoln Oaklanders football program were the college football team representing Lincoln University of Oakland, California. Despite playing multiple NCAA teams, Lincoln was not affiliated with the NCAA or NAIA and played as an independent traveling team with no home stadium. The school's first football team was fielded in 2021. Athletic director Desmond Gumbs was the head football coach from the team's inaugural 2021 season until its discontinuation in 2026.

== History ==
The Oaklanders began play in the 2021 season as an independent, hoping to join the NCAA by 2022.

Athletic director Desmond Gumbs was named head coach for the Oaklanders' inaugural season, while former Super Bowl XLV champion Desmond Bishop served as defensive coordinator. On September 11, 2021, the Oaklanders made their debut against the Whitworth Pirates where they were defeated 31-29. Lincoln earned their first win as a program the following week defeating Willamette 34–9. Lincoln proceeded to lose the following seven games, ending their season with a 1–8 record.

In 2022, the Oaklanders faced a Southland Conference opponent, losing to Texas A&M Commerce, as well as a Big Sky Conference opponent, falling to Portland State, and then a WAC opponent, losing to Southern Utah. The Oaklanders showed slight improvement, finishing the season 2–8. In week 6, they set a program record by scoring 70 points in a 70–0 shutout win against Hilbert College. Lincoln's other win came in week 9 against Bluefield State University where they defeated the Big Blues 20–17.

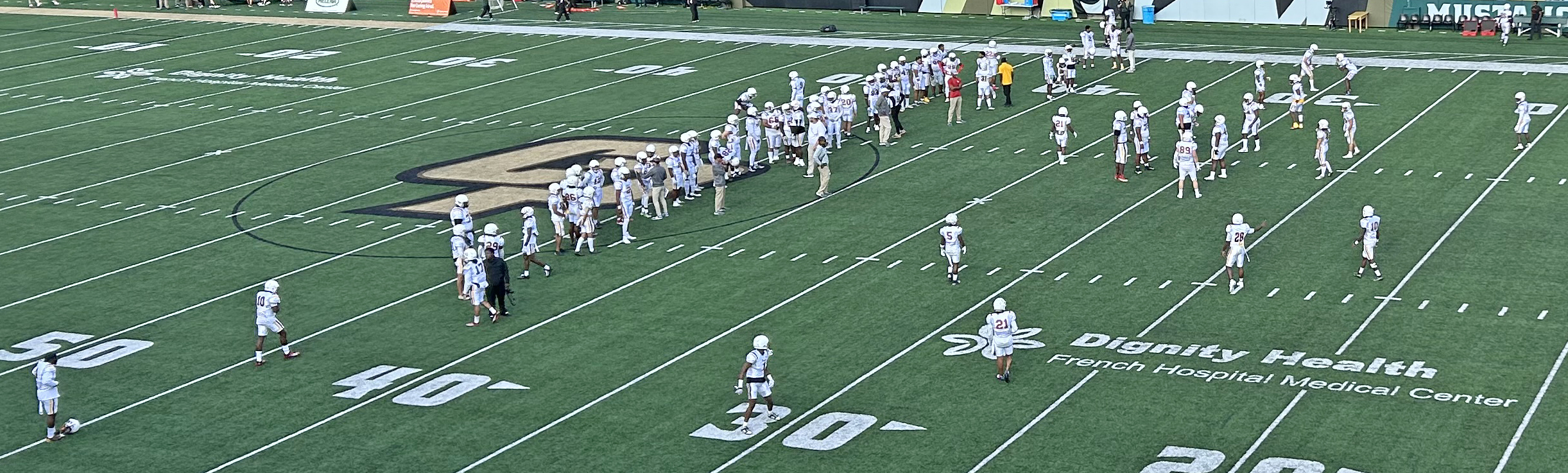
The Lincoln Oaklanders football team practices before a 2023 road game against Cal Poly.

The early portion of the 2023 season saw Lincoln play its first in-state game, taking on a Big Sky program for a second time in its history when facing Cal Poly. Led by upperclassmen including former Ohio State defensive back Amir Riep, former UTEP quarterback T.J. Goodwin, and former North Dakota running back Otis Weah, the Oaklanders briefly held a first-half lead before the Mustangs rallied to ultimately win 41–20.

Throughout the team's existence, Lincoln played its games exclusively as the visitor. Following the departure of the nearby Oakland Raiders in the 2023 offseason, columnist Omar-Rashon Borja of Redshirt Sports opined that RingCentral Coliseum ought to be repurposed into a facility to host Lincoln games.

On February 2, 2024, USA Today published an article critical of the Oaklanders football program, largely characterizing it as being ill-prepared to compete against either NCAA or NAIA schools (as the Oaklanders do not belong to either association and are thus not regulated by any set of outside standards) and having inadequate player support systems and facilities, with one former player calling the Oaklanders "the college Bishop Sycamore". School officials pushed back against allegations of neglect or fraud by some former players, stating that the problems surrounding the program were due to a lack of resources.

After a winless 2025 season that included canceled games against Davenport and West Alabama, the school announced it would shut down its football program for the 2026-27 season. Coach Desmond Gumbs stepped down as head coach, but stayed as athletic director.

== Season-by-season results ==
Year	Coach	Conference	Overall Record
2021	Desmond Gumbs	Independent	1–8
2022	Desmond Gumbs	Independent	2–8
2023	Desmond Gumbs	Independent	0–12
2024	Desmond Gumbs	Independent	0–11
2025	Desmond Gumbs	Independent	0–8
Totals			3–47 (.060)

=== 2021 ===
2021 Lincoln Oaklanders football
- Conference: Independent
- Record: 1–8
- Head coach: Desmond Gumbs (1st season)
- Co-defensive coordinators: Desmond Bishop (1st season); Al Simmons (1st season)

Date	Time	Opponent	Site	TV	Result	Attendance
September 11	1:00 p.m.	at Whitworth	Pine Bowl; Spokane, WA		L 29–31	1,760
September 18	1:00 p.m.	at Willamette	McCulloch Stadium; Salem, OR		W 34–9	300
September 25	4:00 p.m.	at Stephen F. Austin	Homer Bryce Stadium; Nacogdoches, TX	ESPN+	L 13–61	5,346
October 2	5:00 p.m.	at Eastern New Mexico	Greyhound Stadium; Portales, NM		L 6–52	3,880
October 9	4:00 p.m.	at UT Permian Basin	Ratliff Stadium; Odessa, TX		L 0–75	3,560
October 16	5:00 p.m.	at Texas A&M–Kingsville	Javelina Stadium; Kingsville, TX		L 21–51	5,023
October 30	6:00 p.m.	at Central Washington	Tomlinson Stadium; Ellensburg, WA		L 0–92	3,872
November 6	12:00 p.m.	at No. 20 (Div. II) Western Colorado	Mountaineer Bowl; Gunnison, CO		L 6–72	438
November 13	1:00 p.m.	at Western Oregon	McArthur Field; Monmouth, OR		L 16–55	2,025
Rankings from AFCA Poll released prior to the game; All times are in Pacific time

=== 2022 ===
2022 Lincoln Oaklanders football
- Conference: Independent
- Record: 2–8
- Head coach: Desmond Gumbs (2nd season)
- Defensive coordinator: Pat Henderson (1st season)

Date	Time	Opponent	Site	TV	Result	Attendance	Source
September 1	5:00 p.m.	at Texas A&M–Commerce	Memorial Stadium; Commerce, TX	ESPN+	L 7–52	2,130	
September 10	1:00 p.m.	at Western Oregon	McArthur Field; Monmouth, OR		L 10–42	1,123	
September 17	4:00 p.m.	at No. 2 (Div. II) Grand Valley State	Lubbers Stadium; Allendale, MI	FloSports	L 7–66	16,624	
September 24	11:00 a.m.	at St. Thomas (MN)	O'Shaughnessy Stadium; St. Paul, MN		L 6–43	4,359	
October 8	2:00 p.m.	at Portland State	Hillsboro Stadium; Hillsboro, OR	ESPN+	L 6–48	2,921	
October 14	4:00 p.m.	at Hilbert	Polian Family Field; Hamburg, NY		W 70–0	200	
October 22	9:00 a.m.	at No. 22 (Div. II) Davenport	Farmers Insurance Complex; Caledonia, MI		L 14–58	1,300	
October 29	12:00 p.m.	at Texas Southern	PNC Stadium; Houston, TX		L 2–37	6,500	
November 5	9:00 a.m.	at Bluefield	Mitchell Stadium; Bluefield, WV		W 20–17	327	
November 12	10:00 a.m.	at Southern Utah	Eccles Coliseum; Cedar City, UT	ESPN+	L 0–55	3,556	
Rankings from AFCA Poll released prior to the game; All times are in Pacific time

=== 2023 ===
2023 Lincoln Oaklanders football
- Conference: Independent
- Record: 0–12
- Head coach: Desmond Gumbs (3rd season)
- Offensive coordinator: Ny'ika Long (1st season)
- Defensive coordinator: Pat Henderson (2nd season)

Date	Time	Opponent	Site	Result	Attendance
August 26	12:00 p.m.	at No. 12 (NAIA) College of Idaho	Simplot Stadium; Caldwell, ID	L 7–37	2,849
September 2	5:00 p.m.	at Adams State	Rex Stadium; Alamosa, CO	L 16–35	2,876
September 9	1:00 p.m.	at Western Oregon	McArthur Field; Monmouth, OR	L 14–29	2,323
September 16	5:00 p.m.	at Cal Poly	Mustang Memorial Field; San Luis Obispo, CA	L 20–41	9,238
September 23	4:00 p.m.	at Lamar	Provost Umphrey Stadium; Beaumont, TX	L 0–38	4,873
September 30	12:00 p.m.	at Texas Southern	Shell Energy Stadium; Houston, TX	L 7–52	6,352
October 7	10:00 a.m.	at New Haven	Ralph F. DellaCamera Stadium; West Haven, CT	L 0–38	1,131
October 14	2:00 p.m.	at Southern	Ace W. Mumford Stadium; Baton Rouge, LA	L 18–45	21,492
October 21	10:00 a.m.	at Tennessee State	Nissan Stadium; Nashville, TN	L 0–54	2,727
October 28	12:00 p.m.	at Kennesaw State	Fifth Third Bank Stadium; Kennesaw, GA	L 12–28	6,013
November 4	12:00 p.m.	at Southern Utah	Eccles Coliseum; Cedar City, UT	L 6–35	3,023
November 11	3:00 p.m.	at No. 13 (FCS) Florida A&M	Bragg Memorial Stadium; Tallahassee, FL	L 0–28	11,314
Rankings from STATS Poll released prior to the game; All times are in Pacific time

=== 2024 ===
2024 Lincoln Oaklanders football
- Conference: Independent
- Record: 0–11
- Head coach: Desmond Gumbs (4th season)
- Offensive coordinator: Ny'ika Long (2nd season)
- Defensive coordinator: Pat Henderson (3rd season)

Date	Time	Opponent	Site	Result	Attendance
August 24	6:00 p.m.	at No. 4 (NAIA) College of Idaho	Simplot Stadium; Caldwell, ID	L 7–45	3,735
August 31	12:00 p.m.	at Northern Arizona	Walkup Skydome; Flagstaff, AZ	L 6–66	7,342
September 7	1:00 p.m.	at Southern Oregon	Raider Stadium; Ashland, OR	L 7–46	N/A
September 14	4:00 p.m.	at Missouri S&T	Allgood–Bailey Stadium; Rolla, MO	L 6–45	2,567
September 21	10:30 a.m.	at Webber International	Warrior Turf Field; Babson Park, FL	L 20–63	469
October 5	12:00 p.m.	at Lincoln (MO)	Dwight T. Reed Stadium; Jefferson City, MO	L 14–40	4,124
October 12	4:00 p.m.	at Savannah State	Ted Wright Stadium; Savannah, GA	L 18–30	1,760
October 26	4:00 p.m.	at Northeastern State	Doc Wadley Stadium; Tahlequah, OK	L 0–48	4,976
November 2	10:00 a.m.	at West Georgia	University Stadium; Carrollton, GA	L 12–88	1,812
November 9	8:00 a.m.	at Mercyhurst	Saxon Stadium; Erie, PA	L 0–66	540
November 16	10:00 a.m.	at Florida Memorial	Ferguson Recreational Complex; Miami Gardens, FL	L 8–48	898
Rankings from NAIA Coaches' Poll released prior to the game; All times are in Pacific time

=== 2025 ===
2025 Lincoln Oaklanders football
- Conference: Independent
- Record: 0–8
- Head coach: Desmond Gumbs (5th season)
- Offensive coordinator: Ny'ika Long (3rd season)
- Defensive coordinator: Pat Henderson (4th season)

Date	Time	Opponent	Site	TV	Result	Attendance
August 30	4:30 p.m.	at Lincoln (MO)	Dwight T. Reed Stadium; Jefferson City, MO		L 6–55	888
September 6	5:00 p.m.	at Texas A&M–Kingsville	Javelina Stadium; Kingsville, TX		L 12–60	
September 13	3:00 p.m.	at Arkansas–Pine Bluff	Simmons Bank Field; Pine Bluff, AR	SWAC TV	L 8–34	7,542
September 20	3:00 p.m.	at Idaho State	ICCU Dome; Pocatello, ID	ESPN+	L 0–90	6,203
September 25	4:30 p.m.	at Davenport	Farmers Insurance Athletic Complex; Caledonia Township, MI	FloSports	Cancelled	
October 4	4:00 p.m.	at West Alabama	Terry Bunn Field at Tiger Stadium; Livingston, AL	FloSports	Postponed	
October 11	12:00 p.m.	at Alcorn State	Casem-Spinks Stadium; Lorman, MS	SWAC TV	L 0–42	7,201
October 18	12:00 p.m.	at Mississippi Valley State	Rice–Totten Stadium; Itta Bena, MS	SWAC TV	L 0–49	2,788
October 25	12:00 p.m.	at Prairie View A&M	Panther Stadium; Prairie View, TX	SWAC TV	L 0–38	11,427
November 1	4:00 p.m.	at Northeastern State	Doc Wadley Stadium; Tahlequah, OK		L 0–68	5,467
November 8	TBD	at West Alabama	Terry Bunn Field at Tiger Stadium; Livingston, AL		Cancelled	
All times are in Pacific time
