= Eddie Robinson Jr. =

American football player and coach (born 1970)

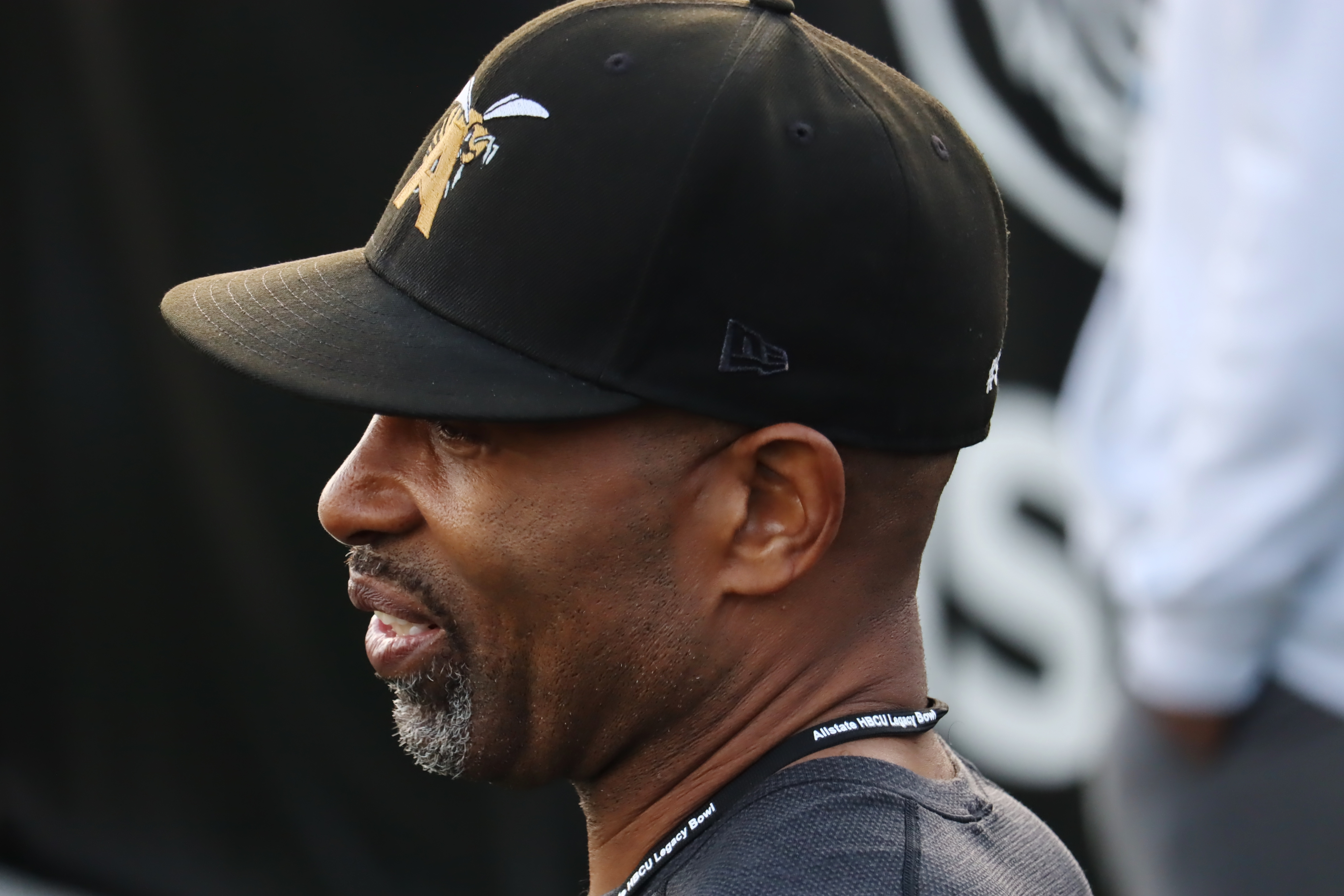
- Robinson in 2024

Alabama State Hornets
- Title: Head coach

Personal information
- Born: April 13, 1970 (age 56); New Orleans, Louisiana, U.S.
- Listed height: 6 ft 1 in (1.85 m)
- Listed weight: 240 lb (109 kg)

Career information
- High school: Brother Martin (New Orleans)
- College: Alabama State
- NFL draft: 1992: 2nd round, 50th overall pick

Career history

Playing
- Houston Oilers (1992–1995); Jacksonville Jaguars (1996–1997); Tennessee Oilers / Titans (1998–2001); Buffalo Bills (2002)

Coaching
- Alabama State (2022–present) Head coach

Career NFL statistics
- Tackles: 804
- Sacks: 23.0
- Forced fumbles: 6
- Fumble recoveries: 12
- Interceptions: 6
- Defensive touchdowns: 1
- Stats at Pro Football Reference

Edward Joseph Robinson Jr. (born April 13, 1970) is an American football coach and former player.

== College career ==
A native of Louisiana, Robinson was born and raised in New Orleans. He attended Brother Martin High School, graduating in 1988. Robinson furthered his education, attending Alabama State University on an academic scholarship and joining the football team as a walk on. He played as an offensive guard during his first season, but eventually switched to linebacker. He earned a Bachelor's of Science Degree in Chemistry in 1994. He is a member of Omega Psi Phi fraternity and pledged at Alabama State University's Gamma Sigma chapter.

Robinson lettered in football all four years and earned All-SWAC honors and SWAC Defensive Player of the Year honors in 1990 and 1991, as well as Sheridan Broadcasting Network All-America honors in 1990 and 1991. Robinson also achieved academic All Conference honors and was recognized as The Toyota Leadership Award recipient in 1990. In 1998, he became the youngest individual to be inducted into the SWAC Hall of Fame at 28 years old, and in 2012 he was recognized as a MEAC/SWAC Challenge Legend.

== NFL career ==
Pre-draft measurables
Height	Weight	Arm length	Hand span	40-yard dash	10-yard split	20-yard split	20-yard shuttle	Vertical jump	Broad jump	Bench press
6 ft 1 1/4 in (1.86 m)	239 lb (108 kg)	33 in (0.84 m)	9 1/8 in (0.23 m)	4.91 s	1.72 s	2.78 s	4.52 s	30.5 in (0.77 m)	9 ft 4 in (2.84 m)	24 reps

Robinson was the Houston Oilers' second round pick in the 1992 NFL draft, the 50th player selected.

He was a stalwart in the community during his 11-year NFL career, playing with the Houston Oilers (1992–1995), Jacksonville Jaguars (1996–1997), Tennessee Oilers / Titans (1998–2001) and Buffalo Bills (2002), appearing in Super Bowl XXXIV with the Titans in 2000. He finished his career with 805 tackles, 23 sacks, six interceptions and one touchdown. Robinson received the Titans Unsung Hero award for the Tennessee Titans during his career. He was the ultimate professional and obtained the knick name "Steady Eddie" for his methodical preparation and on field knowledge of the game, receiving accolades from his coaching staff and teammates for his leadership skills and attention to detail.

== Broadcasting career ==
Robinson was a college football analyst for Fox Sports South, ESPNU, ESPN3 and Comcast from 2005 until 2014. He was also a co-host on a regionally televised weekly sports show INSIDE SWAC from 2006 to 2009,.

== Coaching career ==
On November 26, 2021, Robinson was hired as the head coach for his alma mater Alabama State University.

== Head coaching record ==
Year	Team	Overall	Conference	Standing	Bowl/playoffs
Alabama State Hornets (Southwestern Athletic Conference) (2022–present)
2022	Alabama State	6–5	4–4	T–3rd (East)	
2023	Alabama State	7–4	5–3	T–2nd (East)	
2024	Alabama State	7–5	5–3	T–2nd (East)	
2025	Alabama State	10–2	7–1	T–1st (East)	
2026	Alabama State	6–4	4–3	T–2nd (East)	
Alabama State:		36–20	25–14		
Total:		36–20			
