= 2023 SWAC Football Championship Game =

College football game

- Conference Championship
Prairie View A&M Panthers	Florida A&M Rattlers
(6–5)	(10–1)
14	35
Head coach: Bubba McDowell	Head coach: Willie Simmons
	Coaches / STATS; 5 / 10
	1	2	3	4	Total
Prairie View A&M	0	7	7	0	14
Florida A&M	14	7	7	7	35
- Date: December 2, 2023
- Season: 2023
- Stadium: Bragg Memorial Stadium
- Location: Tallahassee, Florida
- Favorite: Florida A&M by 17.5

United States TV coverage
- Network: ESPN2
- Announcers: Tiffany Greene, Jay Walker and Lericia Harris

2023 Southwestern Athletic Conference football standings
	Conf.			Overall
Team	W		L	W		L
East Division
No. 11 Florida A&M xy$	8	–	0	12	–	1
Alabama State	5	–	3	7	–	4
Jackson State	5	–	3	7	–	4
Alabama A&M	3	–	5	5	–	6
Bethune–Cookman	2	–	6	3	–	8
Mississippi Valley State	1	–	7	1	–	10
West Division
Prairie View A&M xy	6	–	2	6	–	6
Alcorn State x	6	–	2	7	–	4
Southern	5	–	3	6	–	5
Grambling State	4	–	4	5	–	6
Texas Southern	2	–	6	3	–	8
Arkansas–Pine Bluff	1	–	7	2	–	9
Championship: Florida A&M 35, Prairie View A&M 14
$ – Conference champion; x – Division champion/co-champions; y – Championship game participant; Rankings from STATS Poll

The 2023 SWAC Championship Game was a college football game played on December 2, 2023, at Bragg Memorial Stadium in Tallahassee, Florida. It was the 25th edition of the SWAC Championship Game and determined the champion of the Southwestern Athletic Conference (SWAC) for the 2023 season. The game began at 3:00 p.m. CST on ESPN2. The game featured the Florida A&M Rattlers, the East Division champions, and the Prairie View A&M Panthers, the West Division champions. Sponsored by beverage corporation PepsiCo and automotive manufacture General Motors, the game was officially known as the 2023 Pepsi SWAC Football Championship presented by General Motors. By virture of winning the game, Florida A&M received a bid to the Celebration Bowl to face the champions of the Mid-Eastern Athletic Conference (MEAC), the Howard Bison.
