= 2023 Texas Southern Tigers football team =

American college football season

2023 Texas Southern Tigers football
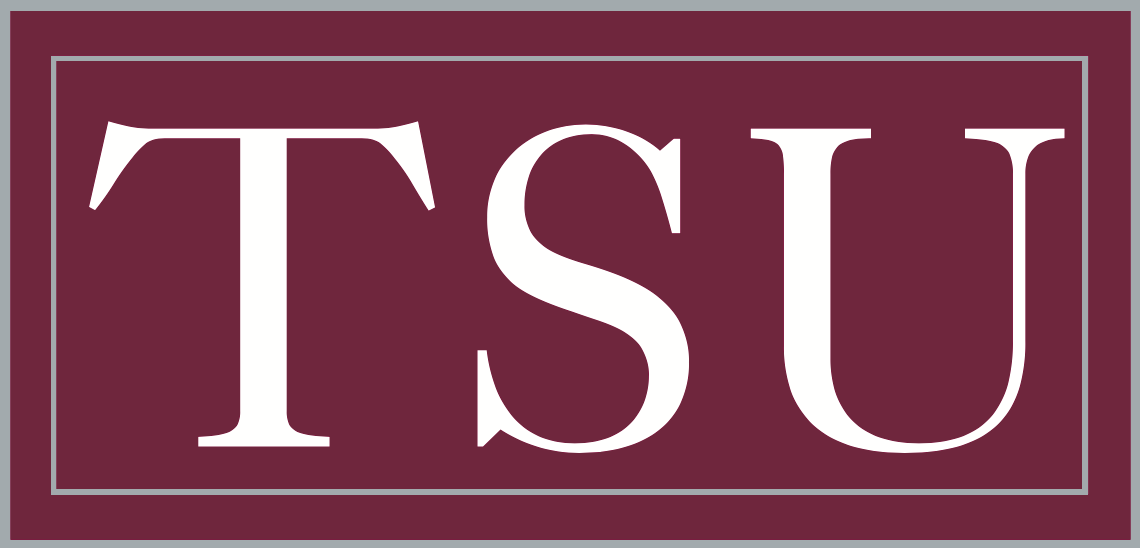
- Conference: Southwestern Athletic Conference
- West Division
- Record: 3–8 (2–6 SWAC)
- Head coach: Clarence McKinney (5th season)
- Offensive coordinator: David Marsh (5th season)
- Defensive coordinator: Jeffery Ceasar (5th season)
- Home stadium: Shell Energy Stadium

2023 Southwestern Athletic Conference football standings
| | Conf. | | | Overall |
| Team | W | | L | W | | L |
|---|---|---|---|---|---|---|
East Division
| No. 11 Florida A&M xy$ | 8 | – | 0 | 12 | – | 1 |
| Alabama State | 5 | – | 3 | 7 | – | 4 |
| Jackson State | 5 | – | 3 | 7 | – | 4 |
| Alabama A&M | 3 | – | 5 | 5 | – | 6 |
| Bethune–Cookman | 2 | – | 6 | 3 | – | 8 |
| Mississippi Valley State | 1 | – | 7 | 1 | – | 10 |
West Division
| Prairie View A&M xy | 6 | – | 2 | 6 | – | 6 |
| Alcorn State x | 6 | – | 2 | 7 | – | 4 |
| Southern | 5 | – | 3 | 6 | – | 5 |
| Grambling State | 4 | – | 4 | 5 | – | 6 |
| Texas Southern | 2 | – | 6 | 3 | – | 8 |
| Arkansas–Pine Bluff | 1 | – | 7 | 2 | – | 9 |
Championship: Florida A&M 35, Prairie View A&M 14
$ – Conference champion; x – Division champion/co-champions; y – Championship game participant; Rankings from STATS Poll

The 2023 Texas Southern Tigers football team represented Texas Southern University as a member of the Southwestern Athletic Conference (SWAC) during the 2023 NCAA Division I FCS football season. Led by fifth-year head coach Clarence McKinney, the Tigers played home games at Shell Energy Stadium in Houston.

== Schedule ==
| Date | Time | Opponent | Site | TV | Result | Attendance |
|---|---|---|---|---|---|---|
| September 2 | 7:00 p.m. | Prairie View A&M | Shell Energy Stadium; Houston, TX (Labor Day Classic) | ESPN+ | L 34–37 | 18,271 |
| September 9 | 2:30 p.m. | at Toledo* | Glass Bowl; Toledo, OH | ESPN+ | L 3–71 | 22,743 |
| September 16 | 6:00 p.m. | at Rice* | Rice Stadium; Houston, TX | ESPN+ | L 7–59 | 18,103 |
| September 23 | 2:00 p.m. | at Grambling State | Eddie Robinson Stadium; Grambling, LA | HBCU Go/ESPN+ | L 23–35 | 4,741 |
| September 30 | 2:00 p.m. | Lincoln (CA)*^{†} | Alexander Durley Sports Complex; Houston, TX | ATTSportsNetSW | W 52–7 | 6,352 |
| October 14 | 2:00 p.m. | at Bethune–Cookman | Daytona Stadium; Daytona Beach, FL | HBCU Go | W 34–31 | 9,458 |
| October 21 | 7:00 p.m. | No. 19 Florida A&M | Shell Energy Stadium; Houston, TX | ESPN+ | L 21–31 | 8,956 |
| October 28 | 4:00 p.m. | at Southern | Ace W. Mumford Stadium; Baton Rouge, LA | | L 17–23 ^{OT} | 19,662 |
| November 4 | 2:00 p.m. | at Jackson State | Mississippi Veterans Memorial Stadium; Jackson, MS | ESPN+ | L 19–21 | 22,819 |
| November 12 | 2:00 p.m. | Alcorn State | Shell Energy Stadium; Houston, TX | ESPN+ | W 44–10 | 3,987 |
| November 18 | 2:00 p.m. | Arkansas–Pine Bluff | Shell Energy Stadium; Houston, TX | HBCU Go/ESPN+ | L 34–35 | 3,482 |
*Non-conference game; ^{†}Homecoming; Rankings from STATS Poll released prior to the game; All times are in Central time

== Game summaries ==
=== at Rice ===
Texas Southern Tigers at Rice Owls – Game summary

| Quarter | 1 | 2 | 3 | 4 | Total |
|---|---|---|---|---|---|
| Tigers | 0 | 7 | 0 | 0 | 7 |
| Owls | 28 | 14 | 10 | 7 | 59 |

at Rice Stadium, Houston, Texas

- Date: September 16
- Game time: 6:00 p.m. CDT
- Game weather: Cloudy, 78 °F (26 °C)
- Game attendance: 18,103
- Referee: Steven Anderson
- TV announcers (ESPN+): Richard Cross and Taylor McHargue

Game information
First quarter
- RICE – Daelen Alexander 1-yard run (Tim Horn kick), 13:04. Owls 7–0. Drive: 4 plays, 16 yards, 1:47.
- RICE – Braylen Walker 35-yard pass from JT Daniels (Tim Horn kick), 11:06. Owls 14–0. Drive: 3 plays, 32 yards, 0:51.
- RICE – Kobie Campbell 70-yard pass from JT Daniels (Tim Horn kick), 9:29. Owls 21–0. Drive: 1 play, 70 yards, 0:12.
- RICE – Jack Bradley 1-yard run (Tim Horn kick), 5:55. Owls 28–0. Drive: 5 plays, 59 yards, 2:08.

Second quarter

- RICE – Dean Connors 3-yard run (Tim Horn kick), 9:37. Owls 35–0. Drive: 5 plays, 33 yards, 2:58.
- TXSO – Jyrin Johnson 15-yard pass from Jace Wilson (Curtis Falkenburg kick), 4:17. Owls 35–7. Drive: 5 plays, 76 yards, 1:48.
- RICE – Luke McCaffrey 36-yard pass from JT Daniels (Tim Horn kick), 1:12. Owls 42–7. Drive: 7 plays, 72 yards, 3:05.

Third quarter

- RICE – Tim Horn 48-yard field goal, 11:02. Owls 45–7. Drive: 9 plays, 47 yards, 3:50.
- RICE – Daelen Alexander 1-yard run (Tim Horn kick), 6:31. Owls 52–7. Drive: 6 plays, 73 yards, 3:38.

Fourth quarter

- RICE – Christian Francisco 4-yard run (Tim Horn kick), 3:13. Owls 59–7. Drive: 2 plays, 13 yards, 0:45.

| Statistics | TXSO | RICE |
|---|---|---|
| First downs | 10 | 23 |
| Total yards | 185 | 485 |
| Rushing yards | 81 | 231 |
| Passing yards | 104 | 254 |
| Turnovers | 2 | 0 |
| Time of possession | 24:26 | 35:34 |

| Team | Category | Player | Statistics |
|---|---|---|---|
| Texas Southern | Passing | Jace Wilson | 9/19, 104 yards, TD |
| Texas Southern | Rushing | Ladarius Owens | 11 rushes, 48 yards |
| Texas Southern | Receiving | Jace Johnson | 4 receptions, 49 yards, TD |
| Rice | Passing | JT Daniels | 11/17, 255 yards, 4 TD |
| Rice | Rushing | Dean Connors | 8 rushes, 66 yards, TD |
| Rice | Receiving | Kobie Campbell | 1 reception, 70 yards, TD |
