= 2023 Bethune–Cookman Wildcats football team =

American college football season

2023 Bethune–Cookman Wildcats football
- Conference: Southwestern Athletic Conference
- East Division
- Record: 3–8 (2–6 SWAC)
- Head coach: Raymond Woodie Jr. (1st season)
- Co-offensive coordinators: Donte' Pimpleton (1st season); Joe Gerbino (1st season)
- Defensive coordinator: Robert Wimberly (1st season)
- Home stadium: Daytona Stadium

2023 Southwestern Athletic Conference football standings
	Conf.			Overall
Team	W		L	W		L
East Division
No. 11 Florida A&M xy$	8	–	0	12	–	1
Alabama State	5	–	3	7	–	4
Jackson State	5	–	3	7	–	4
Alabama A&M	3	–	5	5	–	6
Bethune–Cookman	2	–	6	3	–	8
Mississippi Valley State	1	–	7	1	–	10
West Division
Prairie View A&M xy	6	–	2	6	–	6
Alcorn State x	6	–	2	7	–	4
Southern	5	–	3	6	–	5
Grambling State	4	–	4	5	–	6
Texas Southern	2	–	6	3	–	8
Arkansas–Pine Bluff	1	–	7	2	–	9
Championship: Florida A&M 35, Prairie View A&M 14
$ – Conference champion; x – Division champion/co-champions; y – Championship game participant; Rankings from STATS Poll

The 2023 Bethune–Cookman Wildcats football team represented Bethune–Cookman University as a member of the East Division of the Southwestern Athletic Conference (SWAC) during the 2023 NCAA Division I FCS football season. The Wildcats were led by first-year head coach Raymond Woodie Jr. and played home games at Daytona Stadium in Daytona Beach, Florida.

== Schedule ==
Date	Time	Opponent	Site	TV	Result	Attendance
September 2	7:00 p.m.	at Memphis*	Simmons Bank Liberty Stadium; Memphis, TN	ESPN+	L 14–56	26,632
September 9	4:00 p.m.	Savannah State*	Daytona Stadium; Daytona Beach, FL	YouTube	W 31–6	6,838
September 14	7:30 p.m.	at No. 22 (FBS) Miami (FL)*	Hard Rock Stadium; Miami Gardens, FL	ACCN	L 7–48	40,077
September 23	3:00 p.m.	at Jackson State	Mississippi Veterans Memorial Stadium; Jackson, MS	ESPN+	L 16–22	23,681
October 7	3:00 p.m.	at Alabama State	ASU Stadium; Montgomery, AL	HBCU Go	L 14–19	15,590
October 14	3:00 p.m.	Texas Southern^{†}	Daytona Stadium; Daytona Beach, FL	HBCU Go	L 31–34	9,458
October 21	4:00 p.m.	Southern	TIAA Bank Field; Jacksonville, Florida		L 18–28	10,186
October 28	3:00 p.m.	at Grambling State	Eddie Robinson Stadium; Grambling, LA	HBCU Go	L 14–28	4,500
November 2	7:30 p.m.	Mississippi Valley State	Daytona Stadium; Daytona Beach, FL	ESPNU	W 20–7	4,380
November 11	1:00 p.m.	Alabama A&M	Daytona Stadium; Daytona Beach, FL	HBCU Go	W 31–14	4,915
November 18	3:30 p.m.	vs. No. 11 Florida A&M	Camping World Stadium; Orlando, FL (Florida Classic)	ESPNU	L 7–24	56,227
*Non-conference game; ^{†}Homecoming; Rankings from STATS Poll released prior to the game; All times are in Eastern time

== Preseason ==
On December 27, 2022, Ed Reed was hired as the new head coach for the Wildcats. Bethune–Cookman chose not to ratify Reed's contract on January 21, 2023, which vacated the football team's head coaching position prior to Reed officially becoming the team's head coach. Prior to his dismissal, Reed recorded a live stream on which he vociferously criticized the condition of the school's athletic facilities. In the wake of this decision, Reed continued his criticism of the university, saying "I'm not withdrawing my name as they say. They don't want me here. They do not want me because I tell the truth."
