= T. C. Taylor =

American football coach and player

Current position
- Title: Head coach
- Team: Jackson State
- Conference: SWAC
- Record: 33–9

Biographical details
- Born: September 22, 1978 (age 48); Magnolia, Mississippi, U.S.

Playing career
- 1998–2001: Jackson State
- 2002–2003: New England Patriots
- 2003: Frankfurt Galaxy
- 2003: Amsterdam Admirals
- 2003: Detroit Lions
- Positions: Quarterback, wide receiver

Coaching career (HC unless noted)
- 2005: Coahoma (QB/WR)
- 2006–2011: Coahoma (OC)
- 2012–2013: Texas Southern (WR/RC)
- 2014: North Carolina Central (QB)
- 2015–2016: North Carolina Central (co-OC/QB)
- 2017–2018: North Carolina Central (OC/QB)
- 2019–2020: Jackson State (WR/TE)
- 2020: Jackson State (interim OC)
- 2021–2022: Jackson State (OC/WR/TE)
- 2023–present: Jackson State

Head coaching record
- Overall: 33–9
- Bowls: 1–0

Accomplishments and honors

Championships
- 1 SWAC (2024); 2 SWAC East Division (2024, 2025)

Thomas "T. C." Taylor (born September 22, 1978) is an American football coach and former player who is currently the head coach for the Jackson State Tigers. He played college football for the school as a quarterback and wide receiver, and after graduating had stints in the National Football League (NFL) with the New England Patriots and Detroit Lions, as well as in NFL Europe with the Frankfurt Galaxy and Amsterdam Admirals. He later served as a coach at Coahoma Community College, Texas Southern, and North Carolina Central, before joining Jackson State in 2019.

== Early life and education ==
Taylor was born on September 22, 1978, in Magnolia, Mississippi. He attended South Pike High School and played quarterback, the same position he had played in elementary school and junior high school. He began attending Jackson State University (JSU) in 1998 and spent his first two seasons as backup to Mark Washington. He showed enough promise while backup to Washington that in 2000, Taylor's junior year, he was named starter at the position. However, after struggling in his first two games, Taylor was benched for freshman Robert Kent.

One week after being benched at quarterback, Taylor switched to playing wide receiver. In his first game at the new position he caught one pass. He caught one again in the following game, before scoring his first career touchdown in the third. He then went on to catch 26 passes in the next four games, including eight for 148 yards and two touchdowns against Arkansas–Pine Bluff. Taylor finished his junior year as Jackson State's third leading receiver, having recorded 559 yards and four touchdowns on 34 receptions.

As a senior in 2001, Taylor broke the single-season school record for receptions, finishing with 84 for 1,234 yards and 11 scores. He was named third-team All-American by The Sports Network and first-team Black college All-American by the Sheridan Broadcasting Network. He additionally was the runner-up for the Conerly Trophy, given to the best player in Mississippi (with Eli Manning winning the award). Although Taylor only appeared in a total of 19 games at wide receiver in his career at JSU, he finished with 1,793 receiving yards and over 175 catches.

== Professional career ==
After going unselected in the 2002 NFL draft, Taylor was signed by the defending champion New England Patriots as an undrafted free agent. He was released at the final roster cuts, but later re-signed to the practice squad. He was released from the practice squad in October 2002. Taylor was re-signed in January 2003 and was sent to NFL Europe two months later. Although originally slated to play for the Barcelona Dragons, he ended up appearing in four games for the Frankfurt Galaxy and one for the Amsterdam Admirals. Taylor appeared in the Galaxy's World Bowl XI win over the Rhein Fire. He was released by the Patriots in July 2003, but later signed with the Detroit Lions, before an injury ended his playing career.

== Coaching career ==
Taylor began a coaching career in 2005, being named wide receivers and quarterbacks coach at Coahoma Community College. He served one year in that position before being named offensive coordinator, which he served as through 2011. He left for Texas Southern in 2012, serving two years there as the recruiting coordinator and wide receivers coach. Taylor joined North Carolina Central in 2014, spending his first year as quarterbacks coach. He was promoted to co-offensive coordinator in 2015, and became the team's sole offensive coordinator in 2017. While at North Carolina Central, he helped them earn three conference championships and an appearance in the 2016 Celebration Bowl.

Taylor returned to his alma mater, Jackson State, in January 2019, being hired as quarterbacks coach. He did not serve in that position, ultimately becoming the tight ends and wide receivers coach. He served as interim offensive coordinator in 2020. He rose to full-time offensive coordinator in 2021, while retaining his other positions. After head coach Deion Sanders left for Colorado in December 2022, Taylor was named his successor.

== Head coaching record ==
Year	Team	Overall	Conference	Standing	Bowl/playoffs	STATS^{#}	Coaches'^{°}
Jackson State Tigers (Southwestern Athletic Conference) (2023–present)
2023	Jackson State	7–4	5–3	T–2nd (East)			
2024	Jackson State	12–2	8–0	1st (East)	W Celebration	18	15
2025	Jackson State	9–3	7–1	T–1st (East)			22
2026	Jackson State	5–0	2–0				
Jackson State:		33–9	22–4				
Total:		33–9					
