= 2023 Southern Jaguars football team =

American college football season

2023 Southern Jaguars football
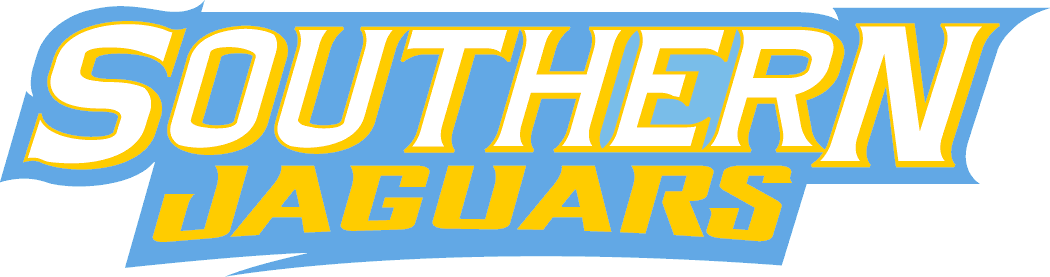
- Conference: Southwestern Athletic Conference
- West Division
- Record: 6–5 (5–3 SWAC)
- Head coach: Eric Dooley (2nd season; first 10 games); Terrence Graves (interim; remainder of season)
- Defensive coordinator: Henry Miller (2nd season)
- Home stadium: A. W. Mumford Stadium

2023 Southwestern Athletic Conference football standings
	Conf.			Overall
Team	W		L	W		L
East Division
No. 11 Florida A&M xy$	8	–	0	12	–	1
Alabama State	5	–	3	7	–	4
Jackson State	5	–	3	7	–	4
Alabama A&M	3	–	5	5	–	6
Bethune–Cookman	2	–	6	3	–	8
Mississippi Valley State	1	–	7	1	–	10
West Division
Prairie View A&M xy	6	–	2	6	–	6
Alcorn State x	6	–	2	7	–	4
Southern	5	–	3	6	–	5
Grambling State	4	–	4	5	–	6
Texas Southern	2	–	6	3	–	8
Arkansas–Pine Bluff	1	–	7	2	–	9
Championship: Florida A&M 35, Prairie View A&M 14
$ – Conference champion; x – Division champion/co-champions; y – Championship game participant; Rankings from STATS Poll

The 2023 Southern Jaguars football team represented Southern University as a member of the Southwestern Athletic Conference (SWAC) during the 2023 NCAA Division I FCS football season. Led by second-year head coach Eric Dooley, the Jaguars played their home games at A. W. Mumford Stadium in Baton Rouge, Louisiana. The Jaguars team drew an average home attendance of 17,465 in 2023.

== Schedule ==
Date	Time	Opponent	Site	TV	Result	Attendance
September 2	5:00 p.m.	at Alabama State*	ASU Stadium; Montgomery, AL	ESPN+	L 10–14	20,726
September 9	6:00 p.m.	Jackson State*	Ace W. Mumford Stadium; Baton Rouge, LA	ESPN+	L 14–27	22,986
September 16	6:00 p.m.	Alabama A&M	Ace W. Mumford Stadium; Baton Rouge, LA	ESPN+	W 20–10	N/A
September 30	4:00 p.m.	at Arkansas–Pine Bluff	Simmons Bank Field; Pine Bluff, AR	Golden Lions All-Access	W 27–0	8,461
October 7	6:00 p.m.	No. 19 Florida A&M	Ace W. Mumford Stadium; Baton Rouge, LA	ESPNU	L 19–26	17,174
October 14	4:00 p.m.	Lincoln (CA)*^{†}	Ace W. Mumford Stadium; Baton Rouge, LA		W 45–18	21,492
October 21	3:00 p.m.	Bethune–Cookman	TIAA Bank Field; Jacksonville, Florida		W 28–18	10,186
October 28	4:00 p.m.	Texas Southern	Ace W. Mumford Stadium; Baton Rouge, LA		W 23–17 ^{OT}	19,662
November 4	2:00 p.m.	at Alcorn State	Jack Spinks Stadium; Lorman, MS	ESPN+	L 21–44	14,592
November 11	2:00 p.m.	Prairie View A&M	Ace W. Mumford Stadium; Baton Rouge, LA	ESPN+	L 21–27	16,470
November 25	1:00 p.m.	vs. Grambling State	Caesars Superdome; New Orleans, LA (Bayou Classic)	NBC	W 27–22	64,698
*Non-conference game; ^{†}Homecoming; Rankings from STATS Poll released prior to the game; All times are in Central time

The game against Alabama State, a fellow member of the Southwestern Athletic Conference, was played as a non-conference game and did not count in the league standings.

The game against Jackson State, a fellow member of the SWAC, was played as a non-conference game and did not count in the league standings.
