= 2023 Grambling State Tigers football team =

American college football season

2023 Grambling State Tigers football
- Conference: Southwestern Athletic Conference
- West Division
- Record: 5–6 (4–4 SWAC)
- Head coach: Hue Jackson (2nd season)
- Offensive coordinator: John Simon (2nd season)
- Co-offensive coordinator: Tony Hull (1st season)
- Defensive coordinator: Cedric Thornton (2nd season)
- Home stadium: Eddie Robinson Stadium

2023 Southwestern Athletic Conference football standings
	Conf.			Overall
Team	W		L	W		L
East Division
No. 11 Florida A&M xy$	8	–	0	12	–	1
Alabama State	5	–	3	7	–	4
Jackson State	5	–	3	7	–	4
Alabama A&M	3	–	5	5	–	6
Bethune–Cookman	2	–	6	3	–	8
Mississippi Valley State	1	–	7	1	–	10
West Division
Prairie View A&M xy	6	–	2	6	–	6
Alcorn State x	6	–	2	7	–	4
Southern	5	–	3	6	–	5
Grambling State	4	–	4	5	–	6
Texas Southern	2	–	6	3	–	8
Arkansas–Pine Bluff	1	–	7	2	–	9
Championship: Florida A&M 35, Prairie View A&M 14
$ – Conference champion; x – Division champion/co-champions; y – Championship game participant; Rankings from STATS Poll

The 2023 Grambling State Tigers football team represented Grambling State University as a member of the Southwestern Athletic Conference (SWAC) during the 2023 NCAA Division I FCS football season. Led by second-year head coach Hue Jackson, the Tigers played their home games at Eddie Robinson Stadium in Grambling, Louisiana.

== Schedule ==
Date	Time	Opponent	Site	TV	Result	Attendance
September 2	2:00 p.m.	vs. Hampton*	Red Bull Arena; Harrison, NJ (Brick City Classic)	NFLN	L 31–35	7,500
September 9	6:30 p.m.	at No. 14 (FBS) LSU*	Tiger Stadium; Baton Rouge, LA	SECN+/ESPN+	L 10–72	97,735
September 16	2:00 p.m.	Florida Memorial*	Eddie Robinson Stadium; Grambling, LA	ESPN+	W 58–22	6,783
September 23	2:00 p.m.	Texas Southern	Eddie Robinson Stadium; Grambling, LA	HBCU Go	W 35–23	4,741
September 30	6:00 p.m.	vs. Prairie View A&M	Cotton Bowl; Dallas, TX (State Fair Classic)	ESPN+	W 35–20	52,389
October 7	2:30 p.m.	at Alcorn State	Jack Spinks Stadium; Lorman, MS	ESPN+	L 24–25	21,012
October 14	2:00 p.m.	Alabama A&M^{†}	Eddie Robinson Stadium; Grambling, LA	ESPN+	L 24–45	8,657
October 28	2:00 p.m.	Bethune–Cookman	Eddie Robinson Stadium; Grambling, LA	HBCU Go	W 28–14	4,500
November 4	4:00 p.m.	vs. Alabama State	Ladd–Peebles Stadium; Mobile, AL	ESPN+	L 6–17	8,601
November 10	8:00 p.m.	at Arkansas–Pine Bluff	Simmons Bank Field; Pine Bluff, AR	ESPNU	W 43–14	3,548
November 25	1:00 p.m.	vs. Southern	Caesars Superdome; New Orleans, LA (Bayou Classic)	NBC	L 22–27	64,698
*Non-conference game; ^{†}Homecoming; Rankings from STATS Poll released prior to the game; All times are in Central time
