= "Showtime" Marching Band =

Marching band of Howard University

"Showtime"
- School: Howard University
- Location: Washington, DC
- Conference: MEAC
- Members: 150+

Uniform
- Red, White, and Navy Blue

"Showtime" is the official name of the marching band at Howard University in Washington, D.C.

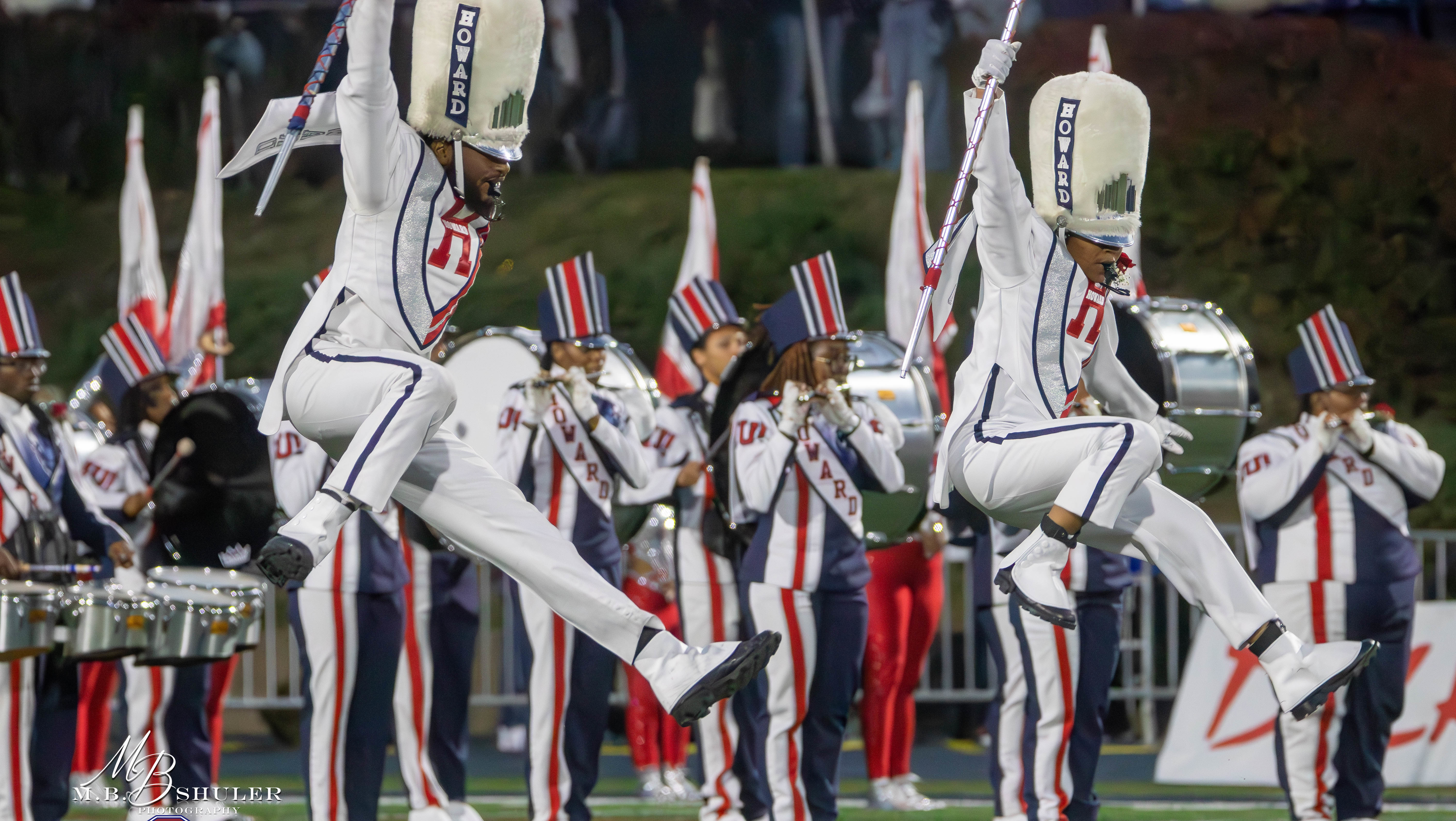
The Showtime Marching Band at Halftime in 2024

== History and appearances ==
The "Showtime" Band performs at all home football contests. In addition to performances at Howard, "Showtime" has a travel schedule that has included performances at numerous NFL games including: the Philadelphia Eagles, New York Jets, Buffalo Bills, Washington Redskins, Pittsburgh Steelers, and Baltimore Ravens, to name a few. These performances have received both national and international attention. Invitations were extended to participate in the 1990 Shrewsbury Music Festival in London, England, the Macy's Thanksgiving Parade in New York, Bermuda Day festivities in Bermuda, and the Inaugural Parade for President Barack Obama.

== Rivalries ==
Showtime maintains rivalries with Hampton University's "The Force" Marching Band, North Carolina A&T's "Blue and Gold Marching Machine," and Morgan State University's "Magnificent Marching Machine."

== Eligibility for membership ==
The "Showtime" Marching Band is open to all Howard University students. Admission into the Marching Band is by audition only. Students interested in joining the Marching band should contact the Director of Bands, Chancellor Mills.

Students who are interested in becoming an Auxiliary member of the band (Dancers - Ooh La La! Dance Line, Flag Corps - The Flashy Flags, Baton Twirlers - The Dazzlin' Diamonds) should also contact the Director of Bands.

== Auditions ==
Students interested in joining the Marching Band should prepare an audition which contains the following:

- Wind Instruments

- Major Scales - Chromatic Scales - A prepared solo which exhibits your abilities on your instrument.

- Percussion

- 40 snare drum rudiments - A snare drum solo

- Auxiliary

The auxiliary sections hold clinics and auditions twice a year. In the spring, current students (rising sophomores, juniors, seniors) interested in becoming a member must attend the week long clinic and audition before the directors. In the fall, only incoming freshmen and transfer students are eligible to attend the mini-clinic and audition."

== Scholarships ==
Scholarships are available to instrumentalists who have been auditioned by the band directors. Scholarships are also awarded on a per year basis at the discretion of the directors based on playing ability and instrumentation until funds are exhausted.

== The Directors ==
- Chancellor D. Mills Director of Bands (2024 - Present)

Chancellor Mills, a native of Baton Rouge, Louisiana earned a Bachelor of Music Education from Southern University and A&M College. While at Southern, he performed as a member of the world-renowned Southern University “Human Jukebox” Marching Band and Wind Ensemble under the direction of Dr. Isaac Greggs, Carnell Knighten, and Lawrence Jackson. Shortly after graduating from S.U. Mr. Mills earned a Master of Music Education degree from VanderCook College of Music in Chicago, Illinois. Mr. Mills is currently a doctoral candidate pursuing an EdD in Educational Leadership with a Specialization in Curriculum & Instruction at the University of Phoenix.

Mr. Mills began his teaching career in 2001 at Lutcher High School in St. James Parish, Louisiana. He later moved to Atlanta, Georgia in 2006, where he was appointed Director of Bands at Banneker High School. In 2009 the Fulton County Public Schools District completed the construction of Langston Hughes High School in Fairburn, Georgia. Mr. Mills accepted the honor of being the school’s inaugural Director of Bands. During his twelve-year tenure at Langston Hughes, the band performed halftime at the Sugar Bowl (New Orleans, LA), halftime at the Champs Sports Bowl (Orlando, FL,) Mardi Gras parades (New Orleans, LA & Mobile, AL), and received first place honors at the 2017 Festival of Gold Concert (Washington D.C.). In addition to the numerous accolades received by the school community, the concert and symphonic bands earned excellent and superior ratings at performance evaluations each year.

Before relocating to Maryland in 2021, Mr. Mills served as the senior class advisor and was awarded the Langston Hughes High School Teacher of the Year. As the Director of Bands, Mr. Mills will lead and direct operations of the athletic ensembles, including the Howard University “Showtime” Marching Band and Pep Band during basketball season. In addition to the duties associated with the athletic bands, Mr. Mills will serves as conductor of the Howard University Wind Symphony. Before being appointed Director of Bands, Mr. Mills served as an Assistant Band Director of the Howard University Showtime Band for two years. To promote music advocacy in public schools, he also taught private lessons at the Maryland Music Academy in Columbia, Maryland, whilst serving as the Director of Bands at Thomas Viaduct Middle School in Howard County. During his three years at TVMS, the band earned superior ratings annually at Music in the Parks festivals.

Mr. Mills is active as an arranger and drill designer for the “Showtime” Marching Band. He is a member of the National Association for Music Educators, Kappa Kappa Psi band fraternity, and Omega Psi Phi fraternity. During his leisure time, Mr. Mills enjoys traveling, cooking, and spending time with his wife Melonie, and children.

- Clifford S. Southern Associate Director of Bands (2024 - Present)

Clifford S. Southern is an accomplished music educator, arranger, and electronic music producer with over 15 years of experience in education and music production. Born in Albany, GA, and raised in metro-Atlanta, Southern developed his musical talents early, studying woodwind and brass instruments in the DeKalb County School District. He went on to earn a Bachelor of Music Education from Southern University and A&M College (Baton Rouge, LA) and a Master's in Music Technology from Southern Utah University (Cedar City, UT).

Southern began his teaching career in the City of Baker Schools in Baker, LA, before moving to Port Arthur Independent School District in Port Arthur, TX. He later returned to his hometown to teach in the DeKalb County School District, where he spent 15 years. Over the course of his career, Southern has helped students secure millions of dollars in scholarship offers, earn first-chair Honor Band placements, achieve superior solo and ensemble performances, and lead excellent and superior-rated band ensembles. His achievements as an educator include arranging music for bands across the country, performing for the family of the late Tupac Shakur, and being honored as a STAR Teacher by the Professional Association of Georgia Educators.

A passionate advocate for music education, Southern believes every student, regardless of their socio-economic background, has the potential to succeed. His professional affiliations include the Georgia Music Educators Association (GMEA), the National Association for Music Education, ASCAP, and Kappa Kappa Psi National Honorary Band Fraternity, Inc. (Zeta Nu).

- Kelvin W. Washington Director of Bands (2019 - 2022)

Kelvin W. Washington is a native of Baton Rouge, Louisiana. He received both his undergraduate and graduate degrees from Southern University in Baton Rouge, Louisiana in Instrumental Music Education. Currently he is a Doctoral candidate at the American Conservatory of Music in Hammond, Indiana.

Mr. Washington began his teaching career at Livonia High School in Louisiana. He later moved to Detroit, Michigan where he was appointed Director of Bands at Nolan Middle School and McKenzie High School in 1987. In 1989 he accepted the position of Chief Arranger and Assistant Director of Bands at the University of Arkansas at Pine Bluff, where he was later appointed Director of Bands.

Now in his sixteenth year as the Conductor for the Howard University Concert Band and Associate Director of Bands, Kelvin Washington has served as clinician and adjudicator for a number of school music programs and festivals. As a professional instrumentalist, Mr. Washington has toured across the United States, Canada, Poland, England and Scotland.

In addition to his university responsibilities, Mr. Washington serves as Orchestra Director and Arranger for many church ministries within the Washington, DC metropolitan area. He is married to Dianna Washington (née Duckett) of Washington, DC. They have one daughter - SuMayah Flousell Washington."

Mr. Washington was removed from his post in 2022, after allegations of physical abuse, sexual harassment, negligence and inappropriate language toward students in the band were made against him.

- Mike Fitzhugh, Associate Director (2019 - 2024)
