= Alonzo Hampton (American football coach) =

American football coach (born 1973)

Current position
- Title: Head coach
- Team: Arkansas–Pine Bluff
- Conference: SWAC
- Record: 9–26

Biographical details
- Born: October 9, 1973 (age 53); Warren, Arkansas, U.S.
- Education: University of Louisiana at Monroe (1997)

Playing career
- 1993–1996: Louisiana–Monroe
- 1998–1999: Frankfurt Galaxy
- Position: Cornerback

Coaching career (HC unless noted)
- 2000–2003: Warren HS (AR) (DC)
- 2004–2005: Dumas HS (AR)
- 2006–2008: Arkansas–Pine Bluff (DB)
- 2009–2010: Arkansas–Pine Bluff (DC)
- 2011–2012: Western Kentucky (DB)
- 2013–2014: Tift County HS (GA) (DB)
- 2015–2016: South Florida (ST/DB)
- 2017: Oregon (def. analyst)
- 2018: Florida State (ST)
- 2019: Arkansas (def. analyst)
- 2021–2022: Louisiana–Monroe (ST/S/AHC)
- 2023–present: Arkansas–Pine Bluff

Head coaching record
- Overall: 9–26 (college); 3–17 (high school)

Alonzo Mondeal Hampton (born October 9, 1973) is an American college football coach. He is the head football coach for the University of Arkansas at Pine Bluff, a position he has held since 2023. He played college football for Louisiana–Monroe as a cornerback and professionally for the Frankfurt Galaxy of NFL Europe. He previously coached for Warren High School, Dumas High School, Arkansas–Pine Bluff, Western Kentucky, Tift County High School, South Florida, Oregon, Florida State, Arkansas, and Louisiana–Monroe.

== Head coaching record ==
=== College ===
Year	Team	Overall	Conference	Standing	Bowl/playoffs
Arkansas–Pine Bluff Golden Lions (Southwestern Athletic Conference) (2023–present)
2023	Arkansas–Pine Bluff	2–9	1–7	6th (West)	
2024	Arkansas–Pine Bluff	3–9	2–6	T–5th (West)	
2025	Arkansas–Pine Bluff	4–8	2–6	5th (West)	
Arkansas–Pine Bluff:		9–26	5–19		
Total:		9–26			

=== High school ===
Year	Team	Overall	Conference	Standing	Bowl/playoffs
Dumas Bobcats () (2004–2005)
2004	Dumas	3–7	3–4	5th	
2005	Dumas	0–10	0–7	8th	
Dumas:		3–17	3–11		
Total:		3–17			
