= Panther Stadium =

Sports venue in Atlanta, Georgia, United States

Clark Atlanta Stadium
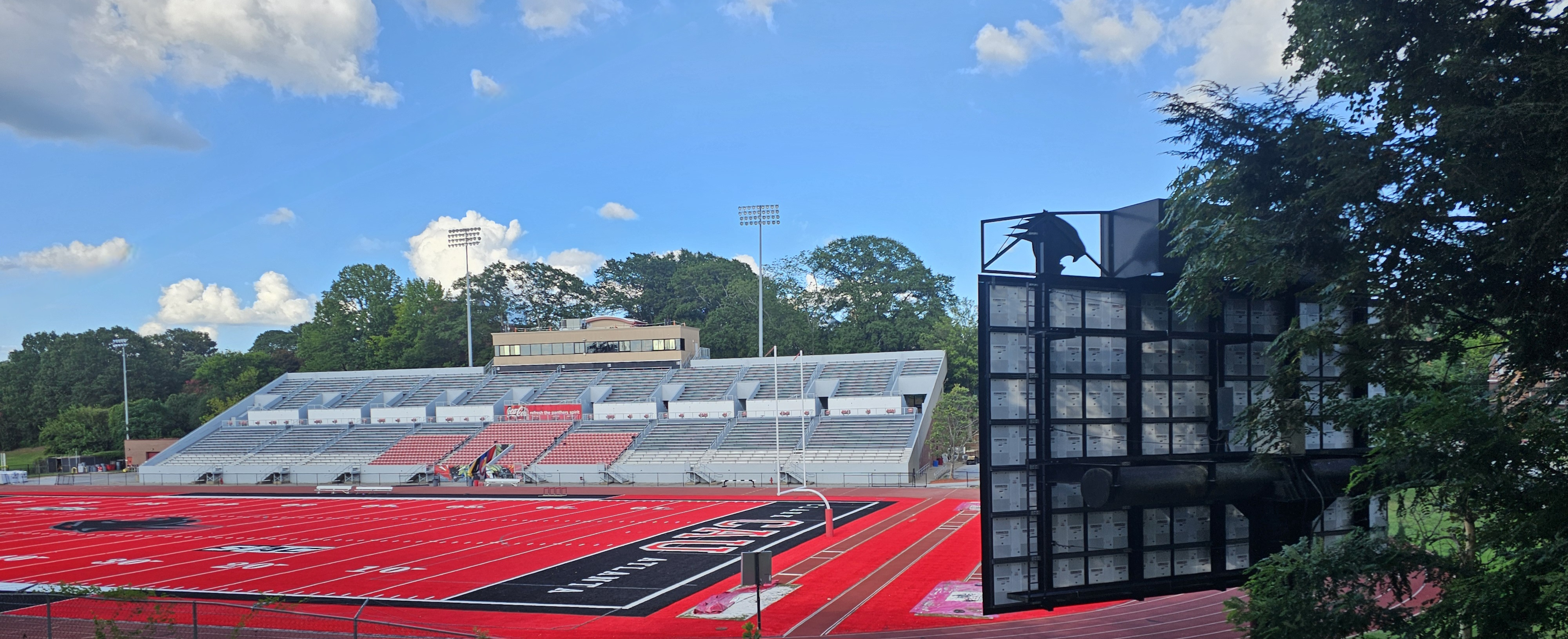
- Interactive map of Clark Atlanta Stadium
- Location: Clark Atlanta University; Atlanta, Georgia
- Coordinates: 33°45′11″N 84°24′40″W
- Owner: Clark Atlanta University
- Operator: Clark Atlanta University
- Capacity: 5,000
- Surface: FieldTurf Prestige Vertex (red)

Tenants
- Clark Atlanta Panthers (NCAA Sports)

Panther Stadium is a 5,000-seat stadium located on the campus of Clark Atlanta University in Atlanta, Georgia, United States. It was the secondary venue for field hockey events during the 1996 Summer Olympics in Atlanta. It is currently home to the Clark Atlanta Panthers, NCAA Division II member. The athletics track surrounding the field was moved there from Centennial Olympic Stadium after the Olympic events concluded and the stadium was converted into Turner Field.

In 2024, the Arthur Blank Family Foundation installed a new red FieldTurf Prestige Vertex field to replace previous fields.
