= Terrell Jennings =

American football player (born 2001)

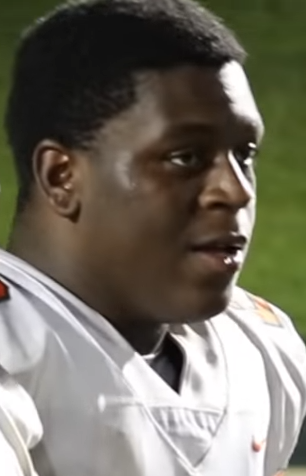
- Jennings with Mandarin High School in 2018

No. 26 – New England Patriots
- Position: Running back
- Roster status: Practice squad

Personal information
- Born: March 1, 2001 (age 25); Jacksonville, Florida, U.S.
- Listed height: 6 ft 0 in (1.83 m)
- Listed weight: 222 lb (101 kg)

Career information
- High school: Mandarin (Jacksonville, Florida)
- College: Florida A&M (2019–2023)
- NFL draft: 2024: undrafted

Career history
- New England Patriots (2024–present)

Career NFL statistics as of 2025
- Rushing yards: 106
- Rushing average: 2.9
- Rushing touchdowns: 1
- Receptions: 1
- Receiving yards: 9
- Stats at Pro Football Reference

Terrell Jennings (born March 1, 2001) is an American professional football running back for the New England Patriots of the National Football League (NFL). He played college football for the Florida A&M Rattlers.

== College career ==
Jennings played college football at Florida A&M University. Over 44 games he rushed for 1,860 yards on 281 attempts with 24 touchdowns.

== Professional career ==
Pre-draft measurables
Height	Weight	Arm length	Hand span	Wingspan	40-yard dash	10-yard split	20-yard split	20-yard shuttle	Three-cone drill	Vertical jump	Broad jump
5 ft 11 3/4 in (1.82 m)	217 lb (98 kg)	31 5/8 in (0.80 m)	10 1/8 in (0.26 m)	6 ft 1 3/4 in (1.87 m)	4.66 s	1.57 s	2.68 s	4.61 s	7.72 s	35.0 in (0.89 m)	9 ft 10 in (3.00 m)
All values from Pro Day

Jennings signed with the New England Patriots as an undrafted free agent in 2024. On August 27, 2024, Jennings was released by the Patriots as part of final roster cuts and re-signed to the practice squad the following day. On December 21, Jennings was signed to the 53-man active roster. In the 2024 season, he appeared in three games and rushed for 33 yards on 13 carries.

On August 26, 2025, Jennings was released by the Patriots as part of final roster cuts and re-signed to the practice squad the following day. On October 29, Jennings was signed to the 53-man active roster. In Week 9 against the Atlanta Falcons, Jennings scored his first NFL touchdown on a three-yard rush in the second quarter. He finished the game rushing for 35 yards on 11 carries and one reception for nine yards in the 24–23 win. Jennings was placed on injured reserve on December 13.

On August 15, 2026, Jennings was waived by the Patriots with an injury settlement. He was re-signed to the practice squad on November 2.

== Personal life ==
Jennings grew up and is close friends with former teammate DeMario Douglas.
