= 2023 The Citadel Bulldogs football team =

American college football season

2023 The Citadel Bulldogs football
- Conference: Southern Conference
- Record: 0–11 (0–8 SoCon)
- Head coach: Maurice Drayton (1st season)
- Offensive coordinator: Patrick Covington (1st season)
- Offensive scheme: Spread option
- Defensive coordinator: Raleigh Jackson (1st season)
- Base defense: 4–3
- Home stadium: Johnson Hagood Stadium

2023 Southern Conference football standings
	Conf.			Overall
Team	W		L	W		L
No. 7 Furman $^	7	–	1	10	–	3
No. 14 Chattanooga ^	6	–	2	8	–	5
No. 17 Mercer ^	6	–	2	9	–	4
No. 23 Western Carolina	5	–	3	7	–	4
Samford	4	–	4	6	–	5
VMI	4	–	4	5	–	6
East Tennessee State	2	–	6	3	–	8
Wofford	2	–	6	2	–	9
The Citadel	0	–	8	0	–	11
$ – Conference champion; ^ – FCS playoff participant; Rankings from STATS Poll

The 2023 The Citadel Bulldogs football team represented The Citadel as a member of the Southern Conference (SoCon) during the 2023 NCAA Division I FCS football season. The Bulldogs were led by first-year head coach Maurice Drayton and played home games at Johnson Hagood Stadium in Charleston, South Carolina. The Bulldogs drew an average home attendance of 11,005 in 2023.

== Schedule ==
Date	Time	Opponent	Site	TV	Result	Attendance
September 2	6:00 p.m.	at Georgia Southern*	Paulson Stadium; Statesboro, GA	ESPN+	L 0–34	17,803
September 9	3:00 p.m.	Campbell*	Johnson Hagood Stadium; Charleston, SC	ESPN+	L 7–56	9,327
September 16	6:00 p.m.	at Chattanooga	Finley Stadium; Chattanooga, TN	ESPN+	L 3–48	6,440
September 23	6:00 p.m.	at South Carolina State*	Oliver C. Dawson Stadium; Orangeburg, SC	ESPN+	L 10–31	9,012
September 30	2:00 p.m.	No. 17 Western Carolina	Johnson Hagood Stadium; Charleston, SC	ESPN+	L 14–49	12,317
October 7	2:00 p.m.	at No. 5 Furman	Paladin Stadium; Greenville, SC	ESPN+	L 14–28	12,157
October 14	1:00 p.m.	VMI	Johnson Hagood Stadium; Charleston, SC (Military Classic of the South)	ESPN+	L 13–17	11,349
October 28	3:00 p.m.	at Samford	Pete Hanna Stadium; Homewood, AL	ESPN+	L 7–37	5,023
November 4	2:00 p.m.	No. 25 Mercer^{†}	Johnson Hagood Stadium; Charleston, SC	ESPN+	L 16–38	11,721
November 11	2:00 p.m.	Wofford	Johnson Hagood Stadium; Charleston, SC	ESPN+	L 3–11	10,312
November 18	1:00 p.m.	at East Tennessee State	William B. Greene Jr. Stadium; Johnson City, TN	ESPN+	L 23–35	5,732
*Non-conference game; ^{†}Homecoming; Rankings from STATS Poll released prior to the game; All times are in Eastern time
