= 2023 VMI Keydets football team =

American college football season

2023 VMI Keydets football
- Conference: Southern Conference
- Record: 5–6 (4–4 SoCon)
- Head coach: Danny Rocco (1st season)
- Offensive coordinator: Patrick Ashford (2nd season)
- Offensive scheme: Pro-style
- Defensive coordinator: Rich Yahner (1st season)
- Base defense: 3–3–5
- Home stadium: Alumni Memorial Field

2023 Southern Conference football standings
	Conf.			Overall
Team	W		L	W		L
No. 7 Furman $^	7	–	1	10	–	3
No. 14 Chattanooga ^	6	–	2	8	–	5
No. 17 Mercer ^	6	–	2	9	–	4
No. 23 Western Carolina	5	–	3	7	–	4
Samford	4	–	4	6	–	5
VMI	4	–	4	5	–	6
East Tennessee State	2	–	6	3	–	8
Wofford	2	–	6	2	–	9
The Citadel	0	–	8	0	–	11
$ – Conference champion; ^ – FCS playoff participant; Rankings from STATS Poll

The 2023 VMI Keydets football team represented the Virginia Military Institute as a member of the Southern Conference (SoCon) during the 2023 NCAA Division I FCS football season. The Keydets were led by first-year head coach Danny Rocco and played home games at Alumni Memorial Field in Lexington, Virginia.

== Schedule ==
Date	Time	Opponent	Site	TV	Result	Attendance
September 2	1:30 p.m.	Davidson*	Alumni Memorial Field; Lexington, VA	ESPN+	W 12–7	5,622
September 9	6:00 p.m.	at Bucknell*	Christy Mathewson–Memorial Stadium; Lewisburg, PA	ESPN+	L 13–21	1,465
September 16	2:00 p.m.	at NC State*	Carter–Finley Stadium; Raleigh, NC	The CW	L 7–45	56,919
September 23	1:30 p.m.	Wofford	Alumni Memorial Field; Lexington, VA	ESPN+	W 17–14	3,787
September 30	4:00 p.m.	at Mercer	Five Star Stadium; Macon, GA	ESPN+	L 3–38	10,769
October 14	1:00 p.m.	at The Citadel	Johnson Hagood Stadium; Charleston, SC (Military Classic of the South)	ESPN+	W 17–13	11,349
October 21	1:30 p.m.	Samford	Alumni Memorial Field; Lexington, VA	ESPN+	L 14–27	4,245
October 28	1:30 p.m.	No. 17 Chattanooga	Alumni Memorial Field; Lexington, VA	ESPN+	L 23–24	5,318
November 4	1:00 p.m.	at East Tennessee State	William B. Greene Jr. Stadium; Johnson City, TN	ESPN+	W 31–24	10,215
November 11	1:00 p.m.	at No. 2 Furman	Paladin Stadium; Greenville, SC	ESPN+	L 3–37	9,277
November 18	12:00 p.m.	No. 14 Western Carolina	Alumni Memorial Field; Lexington, VA	ESPN+	W 27–24	5,297
*Non-conference game; Rankings from STATS Poll released prior to the game; All times are in Eastern time
