= 2023 Wofford Terriers football team =

American college football season

2023 Wofford Terriers football
- Conference: Southern Conference
- Record: 2–9 (2–6 SoCon)
- Head coach: Shawn Watson (1st season)
- Co-offensive coordinators: Tyler Carlton (2nd season); Dane Romero (2nd season)
- Co-defensive coordinators: Rob Greene (4th season); Andrew Warwick (2nd season)
- Home stadium: Gibbs Stadium

2023 Southern Conference football standings
	Conf.			Overall
Team	W		L	W		L
No. 7 Furman $^	7	–	1	10	–	3
No. 14 Chattanooga ^	6	–	2	8	–	5
No. 17 Mercer ^	6	–	2	9	–	4
No. 23 Western Carolina	5	–	3	7	–	4
Samford	4	–	4	6	–	5
VMI	4	–	4	5	–	6
East Tennessee State	2	–	6	3	–	8
Wofford	2	–	6	2	–	9
The Citadel	0	–	8	0	–	11
$ – Conference champion; ^ – FCS playoff participant; Rankings from STATS Poll

The 2023 Wofford Terriers football team represented Wofford College as a member of the Southern Conference (SoCon) during the 2023 NCAA Division I FCS football season. The Terriers were led by first-year head coach Shawn Watson and played home games at Gibbs Stadium in Spartanburg, South Carolina.

== Schedule ==
Date	Time	Opponent	Site	TV	Result	Attendance
September 2	3:30 p.m.	at Pittsburgh*	Acrisure Stadium; Pittsburgh, PA	ACCN	L 7–45	45,096
September 9	6:00 p.m.	at No. 4 William & Mary*	Zable Stadium; Williamsburg, VA	FloSports	L 6–23	8,579
September 16	6:00 p.m.	Presbyterian*	Gibbs Stadium; Spartanburg, SC	ESPN+	L 20–23	3,907
September 23	1:30 p.m.	at VMI	Alumni Memorial Field; Lexington, VA	ESPN+	L 14–17	3,787
September 30	6:00 p.m.	Chattanooga	Gibbs Stadium; Spartanburg, SC	ESPN+	L 13–23	2,956
October 7	1:30 p.m.	Samford	Gibbs Stadium; Spartanburg, SC	ESPN+	L 10–31	4,514
October 14	3:30 p.m.	at East Tennessee State	William B. Greene Jr. Stadium; Johnson City, TN	ESPN+	L 10–41	5,642
October 21	4:00 p.m.	at Mercer	Five Star Stadium; Macon, GA	ESPN+	L 17–31	8,711
November 4	3:00 p.m.	No. 16 Western Carolina^{†}	Gibbs Stadium; Spartanburg, SC	ESPN+	L 25–28	4,996
November 11	2:00 p.m.	at The Citadel	Johnson Hagood Stadium; Charleston, SC	ESPN+	W 11–3	10,312
November 18	12:00 p.m.	No. 2 Furman	Gibbs Stadium; Spartanburg, SC	ESPN+	W 19–13	3,722
*Non-conference game; ^{†}Homecoming; Rankings from STATS Poll released prior to the game; All times are in Eastern time
