= 2023 Western Carolina Catamounts football team =

American college football season

2023 Western Carolina Catamounts football
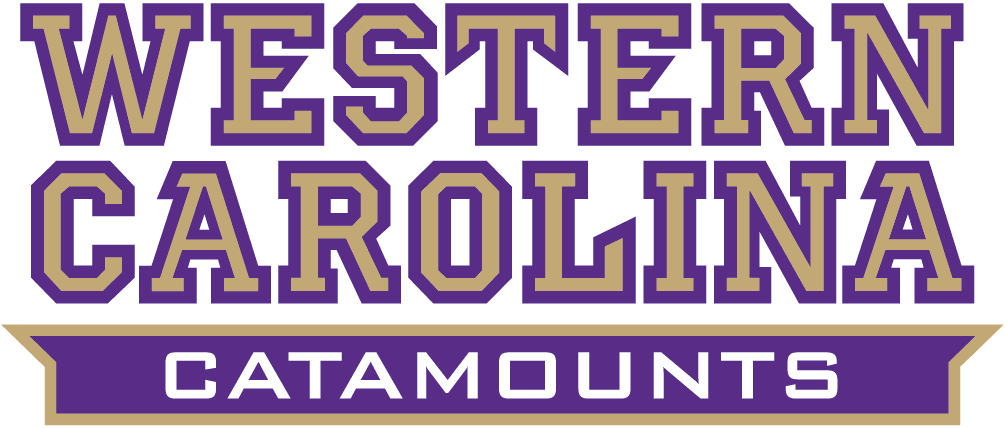
- Conference: Southern Conference

Ranking
- STATS: No. 23
- Record: 7–4 (5–3 SoCon)
- Head coach: Kerwin Bell (3rd season)
- Offensive coordinator: Kade Bell (3rd season)
- Offensive scheme: No-huddle spread
- Defensive coordinator: Chaz Scales (3rd season)
- Base defense: 4–3
- Home stadium: Bob Waters Field at E. J. Whitmire Stadium

2023 Southern Conference football standings
	Conf.			Overall
Team	W		L	W		L
No. 7 Furman $^	7	–	1	10	–	3
No. 14 Chattanooga ^	6	–	2	8	–	5
No. 17 Mercer ^	6	–	2	9	–	4
No. 23 Western Carolina	5	–	3	7	–	4
Samford	4	–	4	6	–	5
VMI	4	–	4	5	–	6
East Tennessee State	2	–	6	3	–	8
Wofford	2	–	6	2	–	9
The Citadel	0	–	8	0	–	11
$ – Conference champion; ^ – FCS playoff participant; Rankings from STATS Poll

The 2023 Western Carolina Catamounts football team represented Western Carolina University as a member of the Southern Conference during the 2023 NCAA Division I FCS football season. The Catamounts were led by third-year head coach Kerwin Bell and played home games at Bob Waters Field at E. J. Whitmire Stadium in Cullowhee, North Carolina. The Western Carolina Catamounts football team drew an average home attendance of 11,935 in 2023.

== Schedule ==
Date	Time	Opponent	Rank	Site	TV	Result	Attendance
September 2	1:00 p.m.	at Arkansas*		War Memorial Stadium; Little Rock, AR	SECN+/ESPN+	L 13–56	44,397
September 9	2:30 p.m.	No. 8 Samford		Bob Waters Field at E. J. Whitmire Stadium; Cullowhee, NC	ESPN+	W 30–7	12,410
September 16	6:00 p.m.	at Eastern Kentucky*		Roy Kidd Stadium; Richmond, KY	ESPN+	W 27–24	13,596
September 23	2:30 p.m.	Charleston Southern*	No. 23	Bob Waters Field at E. J. Whitmire Stadium; Cullowhee, NC	ESPN+	W 77–21	13,357
September 30	2:00 p.m.	at The Citadel	No. 17	Johnson Hagood Stadium; Charleston, SC	ESPN+	W 49–14	12,317
October 7	4:00 p.m.	at No. 24 Chattanooga	No. 11	Finley Stadium; Chattanooga, TN	ESPN+	W 52–50	8,978
October 21	2:30 p.m.	No. 4 Furman	No. 8	Bob Waters Field at E. J. Whitmire Stadium; Cullowhee, NC	ESPN+	L 17–29	10,736
October 28	2:30 p.m.	Mercer^{†}	No. 10	Bob Waters Field at E. J. Whitmire Stadium; Cullowhee, NC	ESPN+	L 38–45	12,154
November 4	3:00 p.m.	at Wofford	No. 16	Gibbs Stadium; Spartanburg, SC	ESPN+	W 28–25	4,996
November 11	1:00 p.m.	East Tennessee State	No. 17	Bob Waters Field at E. J. Whitmire Stadium; Cullowhee, NC	ESPN+	W 58–7	11,019
November 18	12:00 p.m.	at VMI	No. 14	Alumni Memorial Field; Lexington, VA	ESPN+	L 24–27	5,297
*Non-conference game; ^{†}Homecoming; Rankings from STATS Poll released prior to the game; All times are in Eastern time

== Game summaries ==
=== at Arkansas (FBS) ===
Western Carolina Catamounts (0–0) at Arkansas Razorbacks (FBS) (0–0) – Game summary

Quarter	1	2	3	4	Total
Catamounts	3	0	7	3	13
Razorbacks (FBS)	21	14	7	14	56

at War Memorial Stadium • Little Rock, Arkansas

- Date: September 2
- Game time: 1:00 p.m.
- Game weather: Cloudy • Temperature: 82 °F (28 °C) • Wind: NE at 4 miles per hour (6.4 km/h)
- Game attendance: 44,397
- Referee: Ken Williamson
- TV announcers (SECN+/ESPN+): Eric Frede (play-by-play) and Jordan Reid (analyst)
- Box score, Recap

Game information

First quarter

- (13:03) ARK – Jaedon Wilson 65-yard pass from KJ Jefferson, Cam Little kick (Drive: 2 plays, 79 yards, 0:36; Arkansas 7–0)
- (8:40) ARK – Raheim Sanders 3-yard run, Cam Little kick (Drive: 7 plays, 47 yards, 3:26; Arkansas 14–0)
- (3:03) ARK – Isaac TeSlaa 31-yard pass from KJ Jefferson, Cam Little kick (Drive: 1 play, 31 yards, 0:07; Arkansas 21–0)
- (0:15) WCU – Richard McCollum 34-yard field goal (Drive: 8 plays, 59 yards, 2:41; Arkansas 21–3)

Second quarter

- (2:56) ARK – KJ Jefferson 17-yard run, Cam Little kick (Drive: 5 plays, 32 yards, 2:18; Arkansas 28–3)
- (0:00) ARK – Raheim Sanders 1-yard run, Cam Little kick (Drive: 8 plays, 47 yards, 2:44; Arkansas 35–3)

Third quarter

- (10:59) WCU – Desmond Reid 2-yard run, Richard McCollum kick (Drive: 6 plays, 53 yards, 2:12; Arkansas 35–10)
- (6:13) ARK – Andrew Armstrong 16-yard pass from KJ Jefferson, Cam Little kick (Drive: 9 plays, 69 yards, 4:39; Arkansas 42–10)

Fourth quarter

- (7:55) ARK – Davion Dozier 14-yard pass from Jacolby Criswell, Cam Little kick (Drive: 7 plays, 48 yards, 3:51; Arkansas 49–10)
- (4:19) ARK – Brad Spence 85-yard interception return, Cam Little kick (Arkansas 56–10)
- (0:00) WCU – Richard McCollum 33-yard field goal (Drive: 13 plays, 60 yards, 4:19; Arkansas 56–13)

Statistics	WCU	ARK
First downs	18	21
Plays–yards	70–291	61–379
Rushes–yards	30–64	36–105
Passing yards	227	274
Passing: comp–att–int	25–40–4	20–25–0
Time of possession	30:43	29:17

Team	Category	Player	Statistics
Western Carolina	Passing	Cole Gonzales	9/14, 118 yards, 1 INT
Western Carolina	Rushing	Branson Adams	4 carries, 38 yards
Western Carolina	Receiving	Censere Lee	3 receptions, 41 yards
Arkansas	Passing	KJ Jefferson	18/23, 246 yards, 3 TD
Arkansas	Rushing	Raheim Sanders	15 carries, 42 yards, 2 TD
Arkansas	Receiving	Jaedon Wilson	3 receptions, 83 yards, 1 TD

=== vs No. 8 Samford ===
No. 8 Samford Bulldogs (1–0) vs Western Carolina Catamounts (0–1) – Game summary

Quarter	1	2	3	4	Total
Samford	7	0	0	0	7
Western Carolina	7	13	3	7	30

at E.J. Whitmire Stadium • Cullowhee, North Carolina

- Date: September 9
- Game time: 1:30 p.m.
- Game weather: Sunny • Temperature: 76 °F (24 °C) • Wind: SE at 5 miles per hour (8.0 km/h)
- Game attendance: 12,410
- Referee: Michael Farmer
- TV announcers (ESPN+): Pete Yanity (play-by-play) and Jared Singleton (analyst)

Game information

First quarter

- (7:03) SAM – Michael Vice 8-yard pass from Michael Hiers, Wilson Beaverstock kick (Drive: 7 plays, 97 yards, 2:00; Samford 7–0)
- (3:21) WCU – AJ Colombo 21-yard pass from Cole Gonzales, Richard McCollum kick (Drive: 10 plays, 76 yards, 3:32; Tied 7–7)

Second quarter

- (13:42) WCU – Censere Lee 6-yard pass from Cole Gonzales, Richard McCollum kick (Drive: 10 plays, 59 yards, 3:58; Western Carolina 14–7)
- (1:38) WCU – Richard McCollum 23-yard field goal (Drive: 15 plays, 69 yards, 6:43; Western Carolina 17–7)
- (0:00) WCU – Richard McCollum 41-yard field goal (Drive: 2 plays, 20 yards, 0:11; Western Carolina 20–7)

Third quarter

- (4:29) WCU – Richard McCollum 18-yard field goal (Drive: 13 plays, 84 yards, 5:50; Western Carolina 23–7)

Fourth quarter

- (8:02) WCU – Desmond Reid 2-yard run, Richard McCollum kick (Drive: 10 plays, 71 yards, 6:14; Western Carolina 30–7)

Statistics	SAM	WCU
First downs	15	34
Plays–yards	57–361	84–546
Rushes–yards	23–46	49–284
Passing yards	315	262
Passing: comp–att–int	21–34–0	29–35–0
Time of possession	18:51	41:09

Team	Category	Player	Statistics
Samford	Passing	Michael Hiers	21/34, 315 yards, 1 TD
Samford	Rushing	Jay Stanton	7 carries, 26 yards
Samford	Receiving	Ty King	3 receptions, 96 yards
Western Carolina	Passing	Cole Gonzales	29/35, 262 yards, 2 TD
Western Carolina	Rushing	Desmond Reid	27 carries, 170 yards, 1 TD
Western Carolina	Receiving	AJ Colombo	5 receptions, 79 yards, 1 TD

=== at Eastern Kentucky ===
Game Three – Western Carolina Catamounts (0–0) vs Eastern Kentucky Colonels (0–0)

Quarter	1	2	Total
Western Carolina			0
Eastern Kentucky			0

at Roy Kidd Stadium • Richmond, Kentucky

- Date: Saturday, September 16, 2023
- Game time: TBA EST

Game information

First quarter
Second quarter
Third quarter
Fourth quarter

Statistics	WCU	EKU
First downs		
Plays–yards		
Rushes–yards		
Passing yards		
Passing: comp–att–int		
Time of possession		

Team	Category	Player	Statistics
Western Carolina	Passing		
Western Carolina	Rushing		
Western Carolina	Receiving		
Eastern Kentucky	Passing		
Eastern Kentucky	Rushing		
Eastern Kentucky	Receiving		

=== Charleston Southern ===
Game Four – Western Carolina Catamounts (0–0) vs Charleston Southern Buccaneers (0–0)

Quarter	1	2	Total
Charleston Southern			0
Western Carolina			0

at E.J. Whitmire Stadium • Cullowhee, North Carolina

- Date: Saturday, September 23, 2023
- Game time: TBA EST

Game information

First quarter
Second quarter
Third quarter
Fourth quarter

Statistics	CHSO	WCU
First downs		
Plays–yards		
Rushes–yards		
Passing yards		
Passing: comp–att–int		
Time of possession		

Team	Category	Player	Statistics
Charleston Southern	Passing		
Charleston Southern	Rushing		
Charleston Southern	Receiving		
Western Carolina	Passing		
Western Carolina	Rushing		
Western Carolina	Receiving		

=== at The Citadel ===
Game Five – Western Carolina Catamounts (0–0) vs The Citadel Bulldogs (0–0)

Quarter	1	2	Total
Western Carolina			0
The Citadel			0

at Johnson Hagood Stadium • Charleston, South Carolina

- Date: Saturday, September 30, 2023
- Game time: TBA EST

Game information

First quarter
Second quarter
Third quarter
Fourth quarter

Statistics	WCU	CIT
First downs		
Plays–yards		
Rushes–yards		
Passing yards		
Passing: comp–att–int		
Time of possession		

Team	Category	Player	Statistics
Western Carolina	Passing		
Western Carolina	Rushing		
Western Carolina	Receiving		
The Citadel	Passing		
The Citadel	Rushing		
The Citadel	Receiving		

=== at Chattanooga ===
Game Six – Western Carolina Catamounts (0–0) vs Chattanooga Mocs (0–0)

Quarter	1	2	Total
Western Carolina			0
Chattanooga			0

at Finley Stadium • Chattanooga, Tennessee

- Date: Saturday, October 7, 2023
- Game time: 4:00 p.m. EST

Game information

First quarter
Second quarter
Third quarter
Fourth quarter

Statistics	WCU	UTC
First downs		
Plays–yards		
Rushes–yards		
Passing yards		
Passing: comp–att–int		
Time of possession		

Team	Category	Player	Statistics
Western Carolina	Passing		
Western Carolina	Rushing		
Western Carolina	Receiving		
Chattanooga	Passing		
Chattanooga	Rushing		
Chattanooga	Receiving		

=== Furman ===
Game Seven – Western Carolina Catamounts (0–0) vs Furman Paladins (0–0)

Quarter	1	2	Total
Furman			0
Western Carolina			0

at E.J. Whitmire Stadium • Cullowhee, North Carolina

- Date: Saturday, October 21, 2023
- Game time: TBA EST

Game information

First quarter
Second quarter
Third quarter
Fourth quarter

Statistics	FUR	WCU
First downs		
Plays–yards		
Rushes–yards		
Passing yards		
Passing: comp–att–int		
Time of possession		

Team	Category	Player	Statistics
Furman	Passing		
Furman	Rushing		
Furman	Receiving		
Western Carolina	Passing		
Western Carolina	Rushing		
Western Carolina	Receiving		

=== Mercer ===
Game Eight – No. 10 Western Carolina Catamounts (5–2) vs Mercer Bears (5–3)

Quarter	1	2	3	4	Total
Mercer	21	7	7	10	45
No. 10 Western Carolina	7	7	7	17	38

at E.J. Whitmire Stadium • Cullowhee, North Carolina

- Date: Saturday, October 28, 2023
- Game time: 2:30 p.m. EST
- Game weather: Sunny • Temperature: 75 °F (24 °C) • Wind: S 2 mph
- Game attendance: 12,154
- Referee: Jeff Page
- TV: ESPN+

Game information

First quarter

- (13:21) MER – Carter Peevy 2-yard run, Reice Griffith kick (Drive: 4 plays, 28 yards, 1:29; Mercer 7–0)
- (10:00) WCU – David White 18-yard pass from Cole Gonzales, Richard McCollum kick (Drive: 2 plays, 18 yards, 0:13; Tied 7–7)
- (8:04) MER – Ty James 18-yard pass from Carter Peevy, Reice Griffith kick (Drive: 5 plays, 65 yards, 1:56; Mercer 14–7)
- (7:51) MER – Mic Wasson 24-yard fumble recovery, Reice Griffith kick (Mercer 21–7)

Second quarter

- (14:50) MER – Carter Peevy 4-yard run, Reice Griffith kick (Drive: 13 plays, 76 yards, 6:35; Mercer 28–7)
- (2:40) WCU – Branson Adams 12-yard pass from Cole Gonzales, Richard McCollum kick (Drive: 9 plays, 80 yards, 3:15; Mercer 28–14)

Third quarter

- (9:04) MER – Lance Wise 9-yard interception, Reice Griffith kick (Mercer 35–14)
- (2:58) WCU – Ajay Belanger 4-yard pass from Cole Gonzales, Richard McCollum kick (Drive: 13 plays, 92 yards, 5:57; Mercer 35–21)

Fourth quarter

- (14:52) WCU – Ajay Belanger 7-yard pass from Cole Gonzales, Richard McCollum kick (Drive: 4 plays, 51 yards, 1:20; Mercer 35–28)
- (12:02) MER – Reice Griffith 44-yard field goal (Drive: 8 plays, 48 yards, 2:50; Mercer 38–28)
- (8:08) WCU – Calvin Jones 20-yard pass from Cole Gonzales, Richard McCollum kick (Drive: 10 plays, 54 yards, 3:43; Mercer 38–35)
- (6:29) MER – Al Wooten II 17-yard run, Reice Griffith kick (Drive: 4 plays, 55 yards, 1:28; Mercer 45–35)
- (0:07) WCU – Richard McCollum 27-yard field goal (Drive: 9 plays, 60 yards, 1:28; Mercer 45–38)

Statistics	MER	WCU
First downs	26	24
Plays–yards	76–422	71–474
Rushes–yards	48–210	19–86
Passing yards	212	388
Passing: comp–att–int	18–28–1	32–52–3
Time of possession	33:35	26:25

Team	Category	Player	Statistics
Mercer	Passing	Carter Peevy	18/28, 212 yards, TD, INT
Mercer	Rushing	Al Wooten II	15 carries, 68 yards, TD
Mercer	Receiving	Ty James	6 receptions, 115 yards, TD
Western Carolina	Passing	Cole Gonzales	32/51, 388 yards, 5 TD, 3 INT
Western Carolina	Rushing	Branson Adams	9 carries, 46 yards
Western Carolina	Receiving	David White	5 receptions, 113 yards, TD

=== at Wofford ===
Game Nine – Western Carolina Catamounts (0–0) vs Wofford Terriers (0–0)

Quarter	1	2	Total
Western Carolina			0
Wofford			0

at Gibbs Stadium • Spartanburg, South Carolina

- Date: Saturday, November 4, 2023
- Game time: TBA EST

Game information

First quarter
Second quarter
Third quarter
Fourth quarter

Statistics	WCU	WOF
First downs		
Plays–yards		
Rushes–yards		
Passing yards		
Passing: comp–att–int		
Time of possession		

Team	Category	Player	Statistics
Western Carolina	Passing		
Western Carolina	Rushing		
Western Carolina	Receiving		
Wofford	Passing		
Wofford	Rushing		
Wofford	Receiving		

=== East Tennessee State ===
Game Ten – Western Carolina Catamounts (0–0) vs East Tennessee State Buccaneers (0–0)

Quarter	1	2	Total
East Tennessee State			0
Western Carolina			0

at E.J. Whitmire Stadium • Cullowhee, North Carolina

- Date: Saturday, November 11, 2023
- Game time: TBA EST

Game information

First quarter
Second quarter
Third quarter
Fourth quarter

Statistics	ETSU	WCU
First downs		
Plays–yards		
Rushes–yards		
Passing yards		
Passing: comp–att–int		
Time of possession		

Team	Category	Player	Statistics
East Tennessee State	Passing		
East Tennessee State	Rushing		
East Tennessee State	Receiving		
Western Carolina	Passing		
Western Carolina	Rushing		
Western Carolina	Receiving		

=== at VMI ===
Game Eleven – Western Carolina Catamounts (0–0) vs VMI Keydets (0–0)

Quarter	1	2	Total
Western Carolina			0
VMI			0

at Alumni Memorial Field • Lexington, Virginia

- Date: Saturday, November 18, 2023
- Game time: TBA EST

Game information

First quarter
Second quarter
Third quarter
Fourth quarter

Statistics	WCU	VMI
First downs		
Plays–yards		
Rushes–yards		
Passing yards		
Passing: comp–att–int		
Time of possession		

Team	Category	Player	Statistics
Western Carolina	Passing		
Western Carolina	Rushing		
Western Carolina	Receiving		
VMI	Passing		
VMI	Rushing		
VMI	Receiving		

== Roster ==
2023 Western Carolina Catamounts football team roster
Players
Coaches
Offense

Pos.	#	Name	Class
WR	0	AJ Colombo	So
RB	1	Desmond Reid	So
WR	2	Corey Washington	Fr
WR	3	Calvin Jones	So
WR	4	De'Andre Tamarez	Fr
RB	5	Jalynn Williams	Sr
WR	6	Terrence Horne	Sr
WR	7	David White Jr.	Sr
QB	8	Taron Dickens	Fr
QB	9	Cole Gonzales	So
WR	10	Censere Lee	So
TE	11	Ajay Belanger	Sr
QB	12	Brody Palhegyi	So
QB	13	Charlie Dean	Jr
WR	14	Santana Fleming	Fr
WR	15	Jai Boyd	Fr
WR	16	James Tyre	Fr
QB	17	Bennett Judy	Fr
WR	18	Malik Knight	Fr
WR	19	Zion Booker	Fr
RB	20	Corey Reddick Jr.	Fr
RB	22	Branson Adams	So
RB	25	Marlin Cochran	Fr
RB	28	Markel Townsend	Fr
RB	34	Quenten Zanders	Sr
TE	39	Brayden Blackmon	Jr
RB	41	Camury Reid	Fr
OL	51	Aaron Sanez	Fr
OL	52	Antwann Fann	Jr
OL	53	Zach Watson	Fr
OL	60	Therion Cannon	So
OL	61	Hudson Jones	Fr
OL	62	Peyton Davis	So
OL	63	Marselle Felton	Fr
OL	64	Tyler Bailey	Fr
OL	65	Blake Ellsworth	Fr
OL	66	Derek Simmons	Jr
OL	67	Steven Hamby	Fr
OL	69	Ashton Travis	Jr
OL	70	Christian Coulter	Sr
OL	71	Cade McClellan	Fr
OL	72	Blake Whitmore	Jr
OL	73	Xavier Graham	Jr
OL	74	Tyler Smith	Sr
OL	75	Caleb Carter	Jr
OL	76	Nathan Linkous	So
OL	78	Evan Carney	Fr
OL	79	Aidan Alston	Jr
WR	80	Rashad Davis	Fr
WR	81	Ca'Lique Cunningham	Fr
WR	82	Nate Abraham	Fr
WR	83	Ryan Sims	Fr
WR	84	Eric Rasheed	Fr
TE	85	David Hulbert	Fr
TE	86	Clayton Bardall	Sr
TE	87	Jake Young	Fr
WR	88	Patrick Boyd Jr.	Fr
RB		Brandon Benjamin	So
RB		Levi Berryhill	So
RB		Jaiden Bond	So
TE		Ty Handley	Fr
WR		Caden Robinson	Fr
WR		Cade Snotherly	Jr

Defense

Pos.	#	Name	Class
DL	0	Bryce Wilson	Sr
S	1	Mateo Sudipo	Jr
CB	2	Rod Gattison	Sr
CB	3	Samaurie Dukes	So
CB	4	CJ Williams	Jr
LB	5	Hayward McQueen Jr.	So
DL	6	Curtis Fann Jr.	Jr
LB	7	Ed Jones IV	Jr
LB	8	Va Lealaimatafao	Sr
DE	9	Micah Nelson	Jr
DL	10	Tahjae Mullix	So
DL	11	Caleb Fisher	So
CB	12	Ken Moore Jr.	Fr
CB	13	Darian Anderson Jr.	Fr
S	14	Nick Louis	Sr
LB	15	Antoine Williams	Jr
CB	16	Jordy Lowery	Fr
DE	17	Malik Richardson	Jr
LB	18	Antarron Turner	Fr
LB	19	Jayelin Davis	Sr
S	21	Andreas Keaton	Jr
DB	24	Zayveon Wells	Fr
DB	26	Bo Simpson	Fr
LB	27	Skylin Thomas	Jr
DB	29	Devuntray Hampton	GS
DE	30	Kenyon Partridge	Fr
LB	31	Tyler Matheny	GS
DB	32	Trevaughn Martinez	Fr
S	33	Lee Campbell	So
LB	35	Christian Murphy	Fr
S	36	Ja'Morri Downing	Fr
S	37	Marquis Lymon	Fr
S	38	Jhamari Pierre-Louis	Fr
S	40	Cory Hennings	So
S	42	Jayion McMillan	Fr
DB	43	Walter Gibson	Jr
LB	44	Caleb Scott	Jr
DL	45	Justin Wallace	Fr
LB	47	Blue Monroe	Fr
LB	50	Jeno Junius Jr.	Fr
DL	55	Richard Garrett	Fr
LB	58	Giovanni Ricciardi	Jr
LB	59	Anthony Joseph	Fr
DL	90	Marlon Alexander	GS
DL	91	Jaquarius Guinn	Jr
DL	92	Brandon Smiley	Fr
DL	93	Chris Morgan	Jr
DE	96	Isaac McLellan	Fr
DL	97	Caleb Bradford	So
DL	99	Ronald Wilson	Jr
DL		Jackson Hensley	Fr
CB		Joshua McMullen	Fr
CB		Don Robinson III	Fr
DB		Cam Smith	Fr

Special teams

Pos.	#	Name	Class
K	46	Paxton Robertson	Jr
LS	48	Colby Cross	Jr
K	49	Corbin Shirley	Fr
K	89	Richard McCollum	Sr
P	95	Stephen Brantley	Fr
LS		Mabry Bumgarner	Fr

Head coach

- Kerwin Bell

Coordinators/assistant coaches

- Kade Bell – Offensive coordinator/quarterbacks
- Chazmon Scales – Defensive coordinator/safeties
- Chris Norris – Special teams coordinator
- Rudi Small – Running backs
- JJ Laster – Wide receivers
- Rylan Wells – Tight ends/fullbacks
- Jeremy Darveau – Offensive line
- Brian Cochran – Defensive line
- Cody Edwards – Linebackers
- Larry Murphy – Cornerbacks

Legend

- (C) Team captain
- (S) Suspended
- (I) Ineligible
- Injured
- Redshirt

Roster
Last update: January 28, 2024

== Statistics ==
=== Team ===
	Western Carolina	Opp
Scoring		
Points per Game		
Points per Turnovers		
First downs		
Rushing		
Passing		
Penalty		
Rushing yards		
Avg per play		
Avg per game		
Rushing touchdowns		
Passing yards		
Att-Comp-Int		
Avg per pass		
Avg per catch		
Avg per game		
Passing touchdowns		
Total offense		
Plays		
Avg per play		
Avg per game		
Fumbles-Lost		
Penalties-Yards		
Avg per game		

	Western Carolina	Opp
Punt-Yards		
Avg per play		
Avg per punt net		
Punt Return-Yards		
Avg per punt return		
Kickoffs-Yards		
Avg per play		
Avg per kick net		
Kickoff Return-Yards		
Avg per kickoff return		
Interceptions-Yards		
Avg per play		
Time of possession / game		
3rd Down Conversions (Pct%)	(0%)	(0%)
4th Down Conversions (Pct%)	(0%)	(0%)
Touchdowns Scored		
Field Goals-Attempts		
PAT-Attempts		
2 point conversion-attempts		
Sack by Yards		
Misc Yards		
Safeties		
Onside kicks		
Red zone scores	(0%)	(0%)
Red zone touchdowns	(0%)	(0%)
Attendance		
Date/Avg per date		
Neutral Site		

=== Individual leaders ===
Passing statistics
#	NAME	POS	RAT	CMP-ATT-INT	YDS	AVG/G	CMP%	TD	LONG
		QB	0.0	0-0-0	0 yrds		0.0%	0 TDs	0
	TOTALS		0.0	0-0-0	0 yrds	0.0	0.0%	0 TDs	0

Rushing statistics
#	NAME	POS	ATT	GAIN	AVG	TD	LONG	AVG/G
		RB	0	0 yrds	0.0	0 TDs	0	0.0
	TOTALS		0	0 yrds	0.0	0 TDs	0	0.0

Receiving statistics
#	NAME	POS	CTH	YDS	AVG	TD	LONG	AVG/G
		WR	0	0 yrds	0.0	0 TDs	0	0.0
	TOTALS		0	0 yrds	0.0	0 TDs	0	0.0

==== Defense ====
Defense statistics
#	NAME	POS	SOLO	AST	TOT	TFL-YDS	SACK-YDS	INT-YDS-TD	BU	QBH	RCV-YDS	FF	BLK	SAF
			0	0	0	0-0 yrds	0-0 yrds	-	-	-	-	-	-	-
	TOTAL		0	0	0	0-0 yrds	0-0 yrds	0-0 yrds- 0 TDs	0	0	-	0	0	-

Key: POS: Position, SOLO: Solo Tackles, AST: Assisted Tackles, TOT: Total Tackles, TFL: Tackles-for-loss, SACK: Quarterback Sacks, INT: Interceptions, BU: Passes Broken Up, PD: Passes Defended, QBH: Quarterback Hits, FR: Fumbles Recovered, FF: Forced Fumbles, BLK: Kicks or Punts Blocked, SAF: Safeties, TD : Touchdown

==== Special teams ====
Kicking/off statistics
#	NAME	POS	XPM-XPA (XP%)	FGM-FGA (FG%)	1–19	20–29	30–39	40–49	50+	PTS	LNG	KICKS	YDS	AVG	TB	OB
		PK	0-0 (0.0%)	0-0 (0.0%)	-/-	-/-	-/-	-/-	-/-	0 pts	0	0	0 yrds	0.0	0	-
	TOTALS		0-0 (0.0%)	0-0 (0.0%)	-/-	-/-	-/-	-/-	-/-	0	0	0	0 yrds	0.0	0	-

Punting statistics
#	NAME	POS	PUNTS	YDS	AVG	LONG	TB	FC	I–20	50+	BLK
		P	-	-	-	-	-	-	-	-	-
	Team	--	0	-	-	-	-	-	-	-	0
	TOTALS		0	0 yrds	0.0	0	0	0	0	0	0

Kick return statistics
#	NAME	POS	RTNS	YDS	AVG	TD	LNG
			-	-	-	-	-
	TOTALS		0	0 yrds	0.0	0 TD's	0

Punt return statistics
#	NAME	POS	RTNS	YDS	AVG	TD	LONG
			-	-	-	-	-
	TOTALS		0	0 yrds	0.0	0 TD's	0
