= 2023 East Tennessee State Buccaneers football team =

American college football season

2023 East Tennessee State Buccaneers football
- Conference: Southern Conference
- Record: 3–8 (2–6 SoCon)
- Head coach: George Quarles (2nd season)
- Offensive coordinator: Adam Neugebauer (2nd season)
- Defensive coordinator: Billy Taylor (9th season)
- Home stadium: William B. Greene Jr. Stadium

2023 Southern Conference football standings
	Conf.			Overall
Team	W		L	W		L
No. 7 Furman $^	7	–	1	10	–	3
No. 14 Chattanooga ^	6	–	2	8	–	5
No. 17 Mercer ^	6	–	2	9	–	4
No. 23 Western Carolina	5	–	3	7	–	4
Samford	4	–	4	6	–	5
VMI	4	–	4	5	–	6
East Tennessee State	2	–	6	3	–	8
Wofford	2	–	6	2	–	9
The Citadel	0	–	8	0	–	11
$ – Conference champion; ^ – FCS playoff participant; Rankings from STATS Poll

The 2023 East Tennessee State Buccaneers football team represented East Tennessee State University as a member of the Southern Conference (SoCon) during the 2023 NCAA Division I FCS football season. The Buccaneers were led by second-year head coach George Quarles and played home games at William B. Greene Jr. Stadium in Johnson City, Tennessee.

== Schedule ==
Date	Time	Opponent	Site	TV	Result	Attendance
September 2	2:00 p.m.	at Jacksonville State*	JSU Stadium; Jacksonville, AL	ESPN+	L 3–49	21,276
September 9	5:30 p.m.	Carson–Newman*	William B. Greene Jr. Stadium; Johnson City, TN	ESPN+	W 42–0	8,592
September 16	7:00 p.m.	at Austin Peay*	Fortera Stadium; Clarksville, TN	ESPN+	L 3–63	8,296
September 30	1:00 p.m.	at Samford	Seibert Stadium; Homewood, AL	ESPN+	L 28–42	2,931
October 7	3:30 p.m.	Mercer^{†}	William B. Greene Jr. Stadium; Johnson City, TN	ESPN+	L 6–24	9,756
October 14	3:30 p.m.	Wofford	William B. Greene Jr. Stadium; Johnson City, TN	ESPN+	W 41–10	5,642
October 21	1:30 p.m.	at No. 21 Chattanooga	Finley Stadium; Chattanooga, TN	ESPN+	L 3–34	8,144
October 28	2:00 p.m.	at No. 3 Furman	Paladin Stadium; Greenville, SC	ESPN+	L 8–16	11,237
November 4	1:00 p.m.	VMI	William B. Greene Jr. Stadium; Johnson City, TN	ESPN+	L 24–31	10,215
November 11	1:00 p.m.	at No. 17 Western Carolina	Bob Waters Field at E. J. Whitmire Stadium; Charleston, SC	ESPN+	L 7–58	11,019
November 18	1:00 p.m.	The Citadel	William B. Greene Jr. Stadium; Johnson City, TN	ESPN+	W 35–23	5,732
*Non-conference game; ^{†}Homecoming; Rankings from STATS Poll released prior to the game; All times are in Eastern time

== Game summaries ==
=== at Jacksonville State ===
	1	2	3	4	Total
Buccaneers	3	0	0	0	3
Gamecocks	14	7	21	7	49

=== Carson–Newman ===
	1	2	3	4	Total
Eagles	0	0	0	0	0
Buccaneers	14	7	14	7	42

=== at Austin Peay ===
	1	2	3	4	Total
Buccaneers	0	3	0	0	3
Governors	28	7	14	14	63

=== at Samford ===
	1	2	3	4	Total
Buccaneers	0	21	0	7	28
Samford Bulldogs	7	14	14	7	42

=== Mercer ===
	1	2	3	4	Total
Bears	0	17	0	7	24
Buccaneers	0	0	6	0	6

=== At Wofford ===
	1	2	3	4	Total
Terriers	0	0	3	7	10
Buccaneers	10	17	7	7	41

=== at No. 20 Chattanooga ===
	1	2	3	4	Total
Buccaneers	0	3	0	0	3
No. 20 Mocs	14	7	7	6	34

=== at No. 3 Furman ===
	1	2	3	4	Total
Buccaneers	0	0	0	8	8
No. 3 Paladins	6	0	10	0	16

=== VMI ===
	1	2	3	4	Total
Keydets	0	7	7	17	31
Buccaneers	0	10	14	0	24

=== at No. 17 Western Carolina ===
	1	2	3	4	Total
Buccaneers	7	0	0	0	7
No. 17 Catamounts	10	17	21	10	58

=== The Citadel ===
	1	2	3	4	Total
Citadel Bulldogs	0	10	13	0	23
Buccaneers	7	21	7	0	35
