= 2023 Samford Bulldogs football team =

American college football season

2023 Samford Bulldogs football
- Conference: Southern Conference
- Record: 6–5 (4–4 SoCon)
- Head coach: Chris Hatcher (9th season)
- Offensive coordinator: Ricky Turner (2nd season)
- Offensive scheme: Spread
- Defensive coordinator: Chris Boone (2nd season)
- Base defense: 4–3
- Home stadium: Seibert/Pete Hanna Stadium

2023 Southern Conference football standings
	Conf.			Overall
Team	W		L	W		L
No. 7 Furman $^	7	–	1	10	–	3
No. 14 Chattanooga ^	6	–	2	8	–	5
No. 17 Mercer ^	6	–	2	9	–	4
No. 23 Western Carolina	5	–	3	7	–	4
Samford	4	–	4	6	–	5
VMI	4	–	4	5	–	6
East Tennessee State	2	–	6	3	–	8
Wofford	2	–	6	2	–	9
The Citadel	0	–	8	0	–	11
$ – Conference champion; ^ – FCS playoff participant; Rankings from STATS Poll

The 2023 Samford Bulldogs football team represented Samford University as a member of the Southern Conference (SoCon) during the 2023 NCAA Division I FCS football season. The Bulldogs were led by ninth-year head coach Chris Hatcher and played home games at Seibert Stadium in Homewood, Alabama.

On October 14, 2023, Samford University announced that the stadium would be renamed to Pete Hanna Stadium.

== Schedule ==
Date	Time	Opponent	Rank	Site	TV	Result	Attendance
August 31	7:00 p.m.	Shorter*	No. 9	Seibert Stadium; Homewood, AL	ESPN+	W 69–14	5,931
September 9	1:30 p.m.	at Western Carolina	No. 8	Bob Waters Field at E. J. Whitmire Stadium; Cullowhee, NC	ESPN+	L 7–30	12,410
September 16	6:30 p.m.	at Auburn*	No. 18	Jordan–Hare Stadium; Auburn, AL	SECN+/ESPN+	L 13–45	88,043
September 23	2:00 p.m.	Chattanooga	No. 20	Seibert Stadium; Homewood, AL	ESPN+	L 24–47	10,870
September 30	12:00 p.m.	East Tennessee State		Seibert Stadium; Homewood, AL	ESPN+	W 42–28	2,931
October 7	12:30 p.m.	at Wofford		Gibbs Stadium; Spartanburg, SC	ESPN+	W 31–10	4,514
October 14	12:00 p.m.	No. 5 Furman		Pete Hanna Stadium; Homewood, AL	ESPN+	L 21–27	5,908
October 21	12:30 p.m.	at VMI		Alumni Memorial Field; Lexington, VA	ESPN+	W 27–14	4,245
October 28	2:00 p.m.	The Citadel^{†}		Pete Hanna Stadium; Homewood, AL	ESPN+	W 37–7	5,023
November 11	2:00 p.m.	at No. 23 Mercer		Five Star Stadium; Macon, GA	ESPN+	L 21–28	9,772
November 18	12:00 p.m.	No. 19 UT Martin*		Pete Hanna Stadium; Homewood, AL	ESPN+	W 27–17	3,043
*Non-conference game; ^{†}Homecoming; Rankings from STATS Poll released prior to the game; All times are in Central time

== Game summaries ==
=== at Western Carolina ===
Game Two – Western Carolina Catamounts (0–1) vs No. 8 Samford Bulldogs (1–0)

Quarter	1	2	3	4	Total
Samford	7	0	0	0	7
Western Carolina	7	13	3	7	30

at E.J. Whitmire Stadium • Cullowhee, North Carolina

- Date: Saturday, September 9, 2023
- Game time: 12:30 p.m. CST
- Game weather: Sunny • Temperature: 76 °F (24 °C) • Wind: SE 5 MPH
- Game attendance: 12,410
- Referee: Michael Farmer
- TV: ESPN+
- • •

Game information

First quarter

- (7:03) SAM – Michael Vice 8-yard pass from Michael Hiers, Wilson Beaverstock kick (Drive: 7 plays, 97 yards, 2:00; Samford 7–0)
- (3:21) WCU – AJ Colombo 21-yard pass from Cole Gonzales, Richard McCollum kick (Drive: 10 plays, 76 yards, 3:32; Tied 7–7)

Second quarter

- (13:42) WCU – Censere Lee 6-yard pass from Cole Gonzales, Richard McCollum kick (Drive: 10 plays, 59 yards, 3:58; Western Carolina 14–7)
- (1:38) WCU – Richard McCollum 23-yard field goal (Drive: 15 plays, 69 yards, 6:43; Western Carolina 17–7)
- (0:00) WCU – Richard McCollum 41-yard field goal (Drive: 2 plays, 20 yards, 0:11; Western Carolina 20–7)

Third quarter

- (4:29) WCU – Richard McCollum 18-yard field goal (Drive: 13 plays, 84 yards, 5:50; Western Carolina 23–7)

Fourth quarter

- (8:02) WCU – Desmond Reid 2-yard run, Richard McCollum kick (Drive: 10 plays, 71 yards, 6:14; Western Carolina 30–7)

Statistics	SAM	WCU
First downs	15	34
Plays–yards	57–361	84–546
Rushes–yards	23–46	49–284
Passing yards	315	262
Passing: comp–att–int	21–34–0	29–35–0
Time of possession	18:51	41:09

Team	Category	Player	Statistics
No. 8 Samford	Passing	Michael Hiers	21/34, 315 yards, TD
No. 8 Samford	Rushing	Jay Stanton	7 carries, 26 yards
No. 8 Samford	Receiving	Ty King	3 receptions, 96 yards
Western Carolina	Passing	Cole Gonzales	29/35, 262 yards, 2 TD
Western Carolina	Rushing	Desmond Reid	27 carries, 170 yards, TD
Western Carolina	Receiving	AJ Colombo	5 receptions, 79 yards, TD

=== at Auburn (FBS) ===
Game Three – No. 18 Samford Bulldogs (1–1) at (FBS) Auburn Tigers (2–0)

Quarter	1	2	3	4	Total
No. 18 Bulldogs	0	0	13	0	13
(FBS) Tigers	0	17	14	14	45

at Jordan–Hare Stadium • Auburn, Alabama

- Date: Saturday, September 16, 2023
- Game time: 6:02 p.m. CDT
- Game weather: Cloudy • Temperature: 76 °F (24 °C)
- Game attendance: 88,043
- Referee: David Smith
- TV announcers (ESPN+/SEC Network+): Clay Matvick (play-by-play), Aaron Murray (analyst)

Statistics	SAM	AUB
First downs	12	26
Plays–yards	61–218	79–562
Rushes–yards	28–74	43–222
Passing yards	144	340
Passing: comp–att–int	19–33–2	27–36–2
Time of possession	26:32	33:28

Team	Category	Player	Statistics
Samford	Passing	Michael Hiers	18/31, 141 yds, TD, 2 INT
Samford	Rushing	Damonta Witherspoon	5 carries, 30 yds
Samford	Receiving	Ty King	5 receptions, 24 yds
Auburn	Passing	Payton Thorne	24/32, 282 yds, TD, 2 INT
Auburn	Rushing	Payton Thorne	11 carries, 123 yds, 2 TD
Auburn	Receiving	Jay Fair	7 receptions, 93 yds
