= 2023 Chattanooga Mocs football team =

American college football season

2023 Chattanooga Mocs football

NCAA Division I Second Round, L 7–26 at Furman
- Conference: Southern Conference

Ranking
- STATS: No. 18
- FCS Coaches: No. 19
- Record: 8–5 (6–2 SoCon)
- Head coach: Rusty Wright (5th season)
- Offensive coordinator: Joe Pizzo (5th season)
- Defensive coordinator: Lorenzo Ward (5th season)
- Home stadium: Finley Stadium

2023 Southern Conference football standings
	Conf.			Overall
Team	W		L	W		L
No. 7 Furman $^	7	–	1	10	–	3
No. 14 Chattanooga ^	6	–	2	8	–	5
No. 17 Mercer ^	6	–	2	9	–	4
No. 23 Western Carolina	5	–	3	7	–	4
Samford	4	–	4	6	–	5
VMI	4	–	4	5	–	6
East Tennessee State	2	–	6	3	–	8
Wofford	2	–	6	2	–	9
The Citadel	0	–	8	0	–	11
$ – Conference champion; ^ – FCS playoff participant; Rankings from STATS Poll

The 2023 Chattanooga Mocs football team represented the University of Tennessee at Chattanooga as a member of the Southern Conference (SoCon) during the 2023 NCAA Division I FCS football season. The Mocs were led by fifth-year head coach Rusty Wright and played home games at Finley Stadium in Chattanooga, Tennessee.

== Schedule ==
Date	Time	Opponent	Rank	Site	TV	Result	Attendance
September 2	7:00 p.m.	at North Alabama*		Braly Municipal Stadium; Florence, AL	ESPN+	L 27–41	9,361
September 9	6:00 p.m.	Kennesaw State*		Finley Stadium; Chattanooga, TN	ESPN+	W 27–20	8,123
September 16	6:00 p.m.	The Citadel		Finley Stadium; Chattanooga, TN	ESPN+	W 48–3	6,440
September 23	1:00 p.m.	at No. 20 Samford		Seibert Stadium; Homewood, AL	ESPN+	W 47–24	10,870
September 30	6:00 p.m.	at Wofford		Gibbs Stadium; Spartanburg, SC	ESPN+	W 23–13	2,956
October 7	4:00 p.m.	No. 11 Western Carolina^{†}	No. 24	Finley Stadium; Chattanooga, TN	ESPN+	L 50–52	8,978
October 14	4:00 p.m.	at Mercer	No. 25	Five Star Stadium; Macon, GA	ESPN+	W 22–10	8,729
October 21	1:00 p.m.	East Tennessee State	No. 21	Finley Stadium; Chattanooga, TN	ESPN+	W 34–3	8,144
October 28	1:30 p.m.	at VMI	No. 17	Alumni Memorial Field; Lexington, VA	ESPN+	W 24–23	5,318
November 4	1:30 p.m.	No. 2 Furman	No. 14	Finley Stadium; Chattanooga, TN	ESPN+	L 14–17	9,201
November 18	12:00 p.m.	at No. 8 (FBS) Alabama*	No. 18	Bryant-Denny Stadium; Tuscaloosa, AL	SECN+/ESPN+	L 10–66	100,077
November 25	3:00 p.m.	at No. 13 Austin Peay*	No. 18	Fortera Stadium; Clarksville, TN (NCAA Division I First Round)	ESPN+	W 24–21	7,249
December 2	1:00 p.m.	at No. 7 Furman*	No. 18	Paladin Stadium; Greenville, SC (NCAA Division I Second Round)	ESPN+	L 7–26	8,117
*Non-conference game; ^{†}Homecoming; Rankings from STATS Poll released prior to the game; All times are in Eastern time
