= 2023 Furman Paladins football team =

American college football season

2023 Furman Paladins football

SoCon Champion

NCAA Division I Quarterfinal, L 28–35^{OT} at Montana
- Conference: Southern Conference

Ranking
- STATS: No. 7
- FCS Coaches: No. 6
- Record: 10–3 (7–1 SoCon)
- Head coach: Clay Hendrix (7th season)
- Co-offensive coordinators: Chad Byers (2nd season); Justin Roper (2nd season)
- Defensive coordinator: Duane Vaughn (5th season)
- Home stadium: Paladin Stadium

2023 Southern Conference football standings
	Conf.			Overall
Team	W		L	W		L
No. 7 Furman $^	7	–	1	10	–	3
No. 14 Chattanooga ^	6	–	2	8	–	5
No. 17 Mercer ^	6	–	2	9	–	4
No. 23 Western Carolina	5	–	3	7	–	4
Samford	4	–	4	6	–	5
VMI	4	–	4	5	–	6
East Tennessee State	2	–	6	3	–	8
Wofford	2	–	6	2	–	9
The Citadel	0	–	8	0	–	11
$ – Conference champion; ^ – FCS playoff participant; Rankings from STATS Poll

The 2023 Furman Paladins football team represented Furman University as a member of the Southern Conference (SoCon) during the 2023 NCAA Division I FCS football season. The Paladins were led by seventh-year head coach Clay Hendrix and played their home games at Paladin Stadium in Greenville, South Carolina. The Furman Paladins football team drew an average home attendance of 10,467 in 2023.

== Schedule ==
Date	Time	Opponent	Rank	Site	TV	Result	Attendance
August 31	7:00 p.m.	Tennessee Tech*	No. 6	Paladin Stadium; Greenville, SC	ESPN+	W 45–10	9,827
September 9	7:30 p.m.	at South Carolina*	No. 6	Williams–Brice Stadium; Columbia, SC	SECN+/ESPN+	L 21–47	78,281
September 16	5:00 p.m.	at Kennesaw State*	No. 7	Fifth Third Bank Stadium; Kennesaw, GA	ESPN+	W 31–28	6,993
September 23	1:00 p.m.	No. 21 Mercer	No. 8	Paladin Stadium; Greenville, SC	ESPN+	W 38–14	9,387
October 7	2:00 p.m.	The Citadel	No. 5	Paladin Stadium; Greenville, SC	ESPN+	W 28–14	12,157
October 14	1:00 p.m.	at Samford	No. 5	Pete Hanna Stadium; Homewood, AL	ESPN+	W 27–21	5,908
October 21	2:30 p.m.	at No. 8 Western Carolina	No. 4	Bob Waters Field at E. J. Whitmire Stadium; Cullowhee, NC	ESPN+	W 29–17	10,736
October 28	2:00 p.m.	East Tennessee State^{†}	No. 3	Paladin Stadium; Greenville, SC	ESPN+	W 16–8	11,237
November 4	1:30 p.m.	at No. 14 Chattanooga	No. 2	Finley Stadium; Chattanooga, TN	ESPN+	W 17–14	9,201
November 11	1:00 p.m.	VMI	No. 2	Paladin Stadium; Greenville, SC	ESPN+	W 37–3	9,277
November 18	12:00 p.m.	at Wofford	No. 2	Gibbs Stadium; Spartanburg, SC	ESPN+	L 13–19	3,722
December 2	1:00 p.m.	No. 18 Chattanooga*	No. 7	Paladin Stadium; Greenville, SC (NCAA Division I Second Round)	ESPN+	W 26–7	7,118
December 8	9:00 p.m.	at No. 2 Montana*	No. 7	Washington-Grizzly Stadium; Missoula, MT (NCAA Division I Quarterfinal)	ESPN2	L 28–35 ^{OT}	20,884
*Non-conference game; ^{†}Homecoming; Rankings from STATS Poll released prior to the game; All times are in Eastern time

== Game summaries ==
=== at South Carolina (FBS) ===
Game Two – No. 6 Furman Paladins (1–0) at South Carolina Gamecocks (FBS) (0–1) – Game summary

Quarter	1	2	3	4	Total
No. 6 Furman	7	7	0	7	21
South Carolina (FBS)	7	20	13	7	47

at Williams-Brice Stadium • Columbia, South Carolina

- Date: Saturday, September 9, 2023
- Game time: 7:30 p.m. EST
- Game weather: Sunny • 75 °F (24 °C) • Wind: SE 5 mph
- Game attendance: 78,281
- Referee: -
- TV announcers (SECN+/ESPN+): TBD

Game information

First quarter

- (7:27) FU – Dominic Roberto 1-yard run (Axel Lepvreau kick) (Drive: 6 plays, 68 yards, 2:49; Furman 7-0)
- (4:59) SC – Dakereon Joyner 3-yard run (Mitch Jeter kick) (Drive: 7 plays, 72 yards, 2:21; Tied 7-7)

Second quarter

- (11:57) FU – Luke Shiflett 4-yard pass from Tyler Huff (Ian Williams kick) (Drive: 11 plays, 66 yards, 5:04; Furman 14-7)
- (8:26) SC – Spencer Rattler 1-yard run (Mitch Jeter kick) (Drive: 10 plays, 75 yards, 3:31; Tied 14-14)
- (0:43) SC – Luke Doty 36-yard pass from Spencer Rattler (pass failed) (Drive: 10 plays, 74 yards, 3:48; South Carolina 20-14)
- (0:03) SC – O'Mega Blake 3-yard pass from Spencer Rattler (Mitch Jeter kick) (Drive: 3 plays, 75 yards, 0:26; South Carolina 27-14)

Third quarter

- (8:36) SC – Xavier Legette 42-yard pass from Spencer Rattler (Mitch Jeter kick) (Drive: 4 plays, 90 yards, 1:30; South Carolina 34-14)
- (0:09) SC – Tyshawn Russell 50-yard pass from LaNorris Sellers (pass failed) (Drive: 5 plays, 67 yards, 2:01; South Carolina 40-14)

Fourth quarter

- (10:40) SC – Nyck Harbor 7-yard pass from LaNorris Sellers (Alex Herrera kick) (Drive: 6 plays, 38 yards, 2:24; South Carolina 47-14)
- (4:41) FU – Brock Chappell 16-yard pass from Carson Jones (Axel Lepvreau kick) (Drive: 1 play, 16 yards, 0:08; South Carolina 47-21)

Statistics	FU	SC
First downs	16	25
Total yards	65–323	77–571
Rushing yards	31–80	39–108
Passing yards	243	463
Passing: Comp–Att–Int	20–34–1	32–38–0
Time of possession	28:07	31:53

Team	Category	Player	Statistics
Furman	Passing	Tyler Huff	14/24, 129 yards, TD, INT
Furman	Rushing	Jayquan Smith	8 carries, 30 yards
Furman	Receiving	Joshua Harris	6 receptions, 73 yards
South Carolina	Passing	Spencer Rattler	25/27, 345 yards, 3 TD
South Carolina	Rushing	Dakereon Joyner	11 carries, 42 yards, TD
South Carolina	Receiving	Xavier Legette	6 receptions, 118 yards, TD
