= Michael Hiers =

American football player (born 1999)

Profile
- Position: Quarterback

Personal information
- Born: May 28, 1999 (age 27); Birmingham, Alabama, U.S.
- Listed height: 6 ft 1 in (1.85 m)
- Listed weight: 205 lb (93 kg)

Career information
- High school: Briarwood Christian School (Birmingham, Alabama)
- College: Murray State (2018–2019); Northwest Mississippi CC (2020–2021); Samford (2022–2023)
- NFL draft: 2024: undrafted

Career history
- Saskatchewan Roughriders (2024–2025)*; Birmingham Stallions (2026)
- * Offseason or practice squad member only

Awards and highlights
- Southern Conference Offensive Player of the Year (2022); AP Third-team All-American (2022); Stats Perform Second-team All-American (2022); First-team All-Southern Conference (2022); Second-team All-Southern Conference (2023)

Michael Chapman Hiers (born May 28, 1999) is an American professional football quarterback. He played college football for the Murray State Racers, at Northwest Mississippi Community College and for the Samford Bulldogs.

== Early life ==
Hiers was born May 28, 1999, in Birmingham, Alabama. He grew up playing football, basketball and baseball and attended Briarwood Christian School in Birmingham, where he played each of those sports. He played as a shortstop and pitcher in baseball, as a quarterback in football, and as a guard in basketball. He was an All-County and All-City basketball player, an All-State, All-County and All-City baseball player and an All-State and All-County football player at Briarwood Christian. Nicknamed "Magic Mike", he helped the football team compile a 14–1 record with a state championship appearance in his only year as a starter, throwing for 2,672 yards and 22 touchdowns while being the AHSAA Class 5A leader in passing yards, completion percentage (68.8%) and total touchdowns. An unranked recruit, Hiers committed to play college football for the Murray State Racers.

== College career ==
As a true freshman at Murray State in 2018, Hiers redshirted. He then saw limited action in two games in 2019. Hiers transferred to Northwest Mississippi Community College in 2020 and started six games for the team in the COVID-19-shortened season, completing 67% of his pass attempts while throwing for 1,426 yards and 13 touchdowns. He led his school to a perfect record and the junior college national championship, being named the Mississippi Association of Community Colleges Conference (MACCC) most valuable player. He was named first-team All-American, an All-Mississippi Gridiron MVP selection and an All-MACCC choice. In his second season at Northwest Mississippi, Hiers posted a league-leading 3,093 passing yards and 21 touchdowns while being named the co-MACCC Offensive Player of the Year, a first-team All-MACCC selection and a first-team All-State selection.

Hiers transferred to the FCS Samford Bulldogs in 2022 and was named the Southern Conference Offensive Player of the Year, a first-team All-Southern Conference player and a finalist for the Walter Payton Award. He completed 329-of-428 pass attempts for 3,290 yards and 35 touchdowns, being one touchdown short of the school record while being the NCAA Division I leader in completion percentage, as well as being the leader in completions per game, having the third most passing touchdowns, the third most points responsible for and the third most points responsible for per game. He was named a third-team All-American by Associated Press, a second-team choice by Stats Perform and helped Samford reach the FCS playoffs.

Hiers returned to Samford for a final season in 2023, completing 314-of-436 pass attempts for 3,056 yards and 18 touchdowns with a 72.0% completion percentage. Samford compiled a record of 6–5 and Hiers was invited to play at the Tropical Bowl all-star game.

=== Statistics ===
Legend
	FCS record
**Bold**	Career high

Season	Team	Games			Passing								Rushing			
Season	Team	GP	GS	Record	Cmp	Att	Pct	Yds	Y/A	TD	Int	Rtg	Att	Yds	Avg	TD
2018	Murray State	0	0	—	Redshirt											
2019	Murray State	2	0	—	1	1	100.0	4	4.0	0	0	133.6	3	19	6.3	0
2020	Northwest Mississippi	6	6	6–0	94	140	67.1	1,426	10.2	13	1	181.9	30	-37	-1.2	2
2021	Northwest Mississippi	12	12	9–3	212	329	64.4	3,093	9.4	21	4	162.0	42	14	0.3	4
2022	Samford	13	12	11–1	353	461	76.6	3,544	7.7	36	4	165.2	109	163	1.5	3
2023	Samford	11	11	6–5	315	442	71.3	3,056	6.9	18	8	139.2	73	-61	-0.8	3
FCS career		26	23	17–6	669	904	74.0	6,604	7.3	54	12	152.4	185	121	0.7	6
JUCO career		18	18	15–3	306	469	65.2	4,519	9.6	34	5	168.0	72	-23	-0.3	6

== Professional career ==
Pre-draft measurables
Height	Weight	Arm length	Hand span	Wingspan	40-yard dash	10-yard split	20-yard split	20-yard shuttle	Three-cone drill	Vertical jump	Broad jump
6 ft 1 in (1.85 m)	205 lb (93 kg)	31 3/8 in (0.80 m)	9 3/4 in (0.25 m)	6 ft 0 1/2 in (1.84 m)	4.90 s	1.68 s	2.81 s	4.47 s	7.50 s	31.5 in (0.80 m)	9 ft 2 in (2.79 m)
All values from Pro Day

=== Saskatchewan Roughriders ===
Hiers was signed to the practice roster of the Saskatchewan Roughriders of the Canadian Football League in September 2024. On May 10, 2025, Hiers was released by the Roughriders.

=== Birmingham Stallions ===
On January 29, 2026, Hiers signed with the Birmingham Stallions of the United Football League (UFL).
