= 2023 Mercer Bears football team =

American college football season

2023 Mercer Bears football

NCAA Division I Second Round, L 0–41 at South Dakota State
- Conference: Southern Conference

Ranking
- STATS: No. 17
- FCS Coaches: No. 20
- Record: 9–4 (6–2 SoCon)
- Head coach: Drew Cronic (4th season)
- Offensive coordinator: Bob Bodine (4th season)
- Defensive coordinator: Joel Taylor (4th season)
- Home stadium: Moye Complex

2023 Southern Conference football standings
	Conf.			Overall
Team	W		L	W		L
No. 7 Furman $^	7	–	1	10	–	3
No. 14 Chattanooga ^	6	–	2	8	–	5
No. 17 Mercer ^	6	–	2	9	–	4
No. 23 Western Carolina	5	–	3	7	–	4
Samford	4	–	4	6	–	5
VMI	4	–	4	5	–	6
East Tennessee State	2	–	6	3	–	8
Wofford	2	–	6	2	–	9
The Citadel	0	–	8	0	–	11
$ – Conference champion; ^ – FCS playoff participant; Rankings from STATS Poll

The 2023 Mercer Bears football team represented Mercer University as a member of the Southern Conference (SoCon) during the 2023 NCAA Division I FCS football season. The Bears were led by fourth-year head coach Drew Cronic and played home games at Moye Complex in Macon, Georgia.

== Schedule ==
Date	Time	Opponent	Rank	Site	TV	Result	Attendance
August 26	3:30 p.m.	vs. North Alabama*	No. 20	Cramton Bowl; Montgomery, AL (FCS Kickoff)	ESPN	W 17–7	5,566
September 2	2:00 p.m.	at No. 22 (FBS) Ole Miss*	No. 20	Vaught–Hemingway Stadium; Oxford, MS	SECN+/ESPN+	L 7–73	60,097
September 9	7:00 p.m.	Morehead State*	No. 20	Five Star Stadium; Macon, GA	ESPN+	W 48–22	10,722
September 23	1:00 p.m.	at No. 8 Furman	No. 21	Paladin Stadium; Greenville, SC	ESPN+	L 14–38	9,387
September 30	4:00 p.m.	VMI		Five Star Stadium; Macon, GA	ESPN+	W 38–3	10,769
October 7	3:30 p.m.	at East Tennessee State		William B. Greene Jr. Stadium; Johnson City, TN	ESPN+	W 24–6	9,756
October 14	4:00 p.m.	No. 25 Chattanooga		Five Star Stadium; Macon, GA	ESPN+	L 10–22	8,729
October 21	4:00 p.m.	Wofford		Five Star Stadium; Macon, GA	ESPN+	W 31–17	8,711
October 28	2:30 p.m.	at No. 10 Western Carolina		Bob Waters Field at E. J. Whitmire Stadium; Cullowhee, NC	ESPN+	W 45–38	12,154
November 4	2:00 p.m.	at The Citadel	No. 25	Johnson Hagood Stadium; Charleston, SC	ESPN+	W 38–16	11,721
November 11	3:00 p.m.	Samford	No. 23	Five Star Stadium; Macon, GA	ESPN+	W 28–21	9,772
November 25	3:00 p.m.	Gardner–Webb*	No. 17	Five Star Stadium; Macon, GA (NCAA Division I First Round)	ESPN+	W 17–7	4,500
December 2	2:00 p.m.	at No. 1 South Dakota State*	No. 17	Dana J. Dykhouse Stadium; Brookings, SD (NCAA Division I Second Round)	ESPN+	L 0–41	10,171
*Non-conference game; Rankings from STATS Poll released prior to the game; All times are in Eastern time

== Game summaries ==
=== vs. North Alabama ===
Team	1	2	3	4	Total
North Alabama	7	0	0	0	7
• Mercer	7	3	0	7	17

- Date: August 26
- Location: Cramton Bowl
- Game start: 3:36 p.m. EST
- Game attendance: 5,566
- Game weather: 102, Sunny, Wind S @ 7 mph
- Referee: Brian Holland
- TV announcers (ESPN): Roy Philpott (play-by-play), Roddy Jones (color), and Taylor McGregor (sideline)

Statistics	Mercer	UNA
First downs	21	12
Total yards	286	248
Rushing yards	170	156
Passing yards	92	115
Turnovers	0	0
Time of possession	32:35	27:25

Team	Category	Player	Statistics
Mercer	Passing	Carter Peevy	12/17, 115 yards, 1 TD
Mercer	Rushing	Micah Bell	20 carries, 73 yards
Mercer	Receiving	Ty James	4 receptions, 57 yards, 1 TD
UNA	Passing	Noah Walters	10/17, 65 yards
UNA	Rushing	Jalyn Daniels	3 carries, 49 yards
UNA	Receiving	Kobe Warren	6 receptions, 37 yards

Scoring summary

Quarter	Time	Drive			Team	Scoring information	Score	
Quarter	Time	Plays	Yards	TOP	Team	Scoring information	North Alabama	#20 Mercer
1st	10:06	9	49	4:54	MER	Ty James 14-yard touchdown reception from Carter Peevy, Reice Griffith kick good	0	7
1st	1:44	6	51	3:18	UNA	TJ Smith 3-yard touchdown run, Sam Contorno kick good	7	7
2nd	4:40	11	59	3:19	MER	24-yard field goal by Riece Griffith	7	10
4th	11:45	8	41	3:44	MER	Micah Bell 3-yard touchdown run, Riece Griffith kick good	7	17
"TOP" = time of possession. For other American football terms, see Glossary of American football.							7	17

=== at No. 22 (FBS) Ole Miss ===
Uniform Combination
Helmet	Jersey	Pants

No. 20 Mercer Bears (1–0) at No. 22 (FBS) Ole Miss Rebels (0–0)

Quarter	1	2	3	4	Total
No. 20 Bears	7	0	0	0	7
No. 22 (FBS) Rebels	28	10	28	7	73

at Vaught-Hemingway Stadium • Oxford, MS

- Date: Saturday, September 2, 2023
- Game time: 2:00 p.m. EST
- Game weather: Cloudy • Temperature: 81 °F (27 °C)
- Game attendance: 60,097
- Referee: Ted Pitts
- TV announcers (ESPN+/SECN+):
  Justin Kutcher (play-by-play)
  Dave Steckel (color)

Game information

First Quarter

- (14:05) Ole Miss – Tre Harris 38 Yd pass from Jaxson Dart (Caden Davis Kick)
  Ole Miss 7–0; 3 plays, 72 yards, 0:51
- (13:53) Mercer – Carter Peevy 75 Yd Run (Reice Griffith Kick)
  Tied 7–7; 1 play, 75 yards, 0:12
- (12:26) Ole Miss – Tre Harris 28 Yd pass from Jaxson Dart (Caden Costa Kick)
  Ole Miss 14–7; 5 plays, 69 yards, 1:21
- (11:45) Ole Miss – Tre Harris 20 Yd pass from Jaxson Dart (Caden Davis Kick)
  Ole Miss 21–7; 2 plays, 20 yards, 0:34
- (5:45) Ole Miss – Quinshon Judkins 1 Yd Run (Caden Costa Kick)
  Ole Miss 28–7; 7 plays, 77 yards, 0:51

Second Quarter

- (6:25) Ole Miss – Caden Davis 31 Yd Field Goal
  Ole Miss 31–7; 9 plays, 20 yards, 2:51
- (0:32) Ole Miss – Quinshon Judkins 3 Yd Run (Caden Davis Kick)
  Ole Miss 38–7; 10 plays, 84 yards, 2:33

Third Quarter

- (13:07) Ole Miss – Jordan Watkins 70 Yd Punt Return (Caden Costa Kick)
  Ole Miss 45–7
- (9:45) Ole Miss – Tre Harris 16 Yd pass from Jaxson Dart (Caden Davis Kick)
  Ole Miss 52–7; 3 plays, 27 yards, 1:15
- (5:27) Ole Miss – Ulysses Bentley IV 6 Yd pass from Spencer Sanders (Caden Costa Kick)
  Ole Miss 59–7; 10 plays, 76 yards, 2:41
- (3:09) Ole Miss – Cayden Lee 34 Yd pass from Spencer Sanders (Caden Davis Kick)
  Ole Miss 66–7; 6 plays, 66 yards, 1:25

Fourth Quarter

- (3:21) Ole Miss – Matt Jones 1 Yd Run (Caden Costa Kick)
  Ole Miss 73–7; 12 plays, 65 yards, 5:25

Statistics	MER	MISS
First downs	15	32
Total yards	235	667
Passing yards	142	524
Rushes/yards	37/93	33/143
Penalties/yards	7/50	7/65
Turnovers	3	1
Time of possession	35:10	24:50

Team	Category	Player	Statistics
Mercer	Passing	Carter Peevy	16/29, 138 yards, 1 INT
Mercer	Rushing	Carter Peevy	7 carries, 49 yards, 1 TD
Mercer	Receiving	Devron Harper	4 receptions, 47 yards
Ole Miss	Passing	Jaxson Dart	18/23, 334 yards, 4 TD
Ole Miss	Rushing	Quinshon Judkins	13 carries, 60 yards, 2 TD
Ole Miss	Receiving	Tre Harris	6 receptions, 133 yards, 4 TD

=== Morehead State ===
	1	2	3	4	Total
Eagles	3	12	7	0	22
Bears	14	7	9	18	48

=== at No. 8 Furman ===
	1	2	3	4	Total
Bears	0	7	7	0	14
No. 8 Paladins	0	17	7	14	38

=== VMI ===
	1	2	3	4	Total
Keydets	0	0	3	0	3
Bears	7	14	14	3	38

=== at East Tennessee State ===
	1	2	3	4	Total
Bears	0	17	0	7	24
Buccaneers	0	0	6	0	6

=== No. 25 Chattanooga ===
	1	2	3	4	Total
No. 25 Mocs'	6	6	7	3	22
Bears	0	0	10	0	10

=== Wofford ===
	1	2	3	4	Total
Terriers	0	7	0	10	17
Bears	7	3	0	21	31

=== at No. 10 Western Carolina ===
Game Nine – No. 10 Western Carolina Catamounts (5–2) vs Mercer Bears (5–3)

Quarter	1	2	3	4	Total
Mercer	21	7	7	10	45
No. 10 Western Carolina	7	7	7	17	38

at E.J. Whitmire Stadium • Cullowhee, North Carolina

- Date: Saturday, October 28, 2023
- Game time: 2:30 p.m. EST
- Game weather: Sunny • Temperature: 75 °F (24 °C) • Wind: S 2 mph
- Game attendance: 12,154
- Referee: Jeff Page
- TV: ESPN+

Game information

First quarter

- (13:21) MER – Carter Peevy 2-yard run, Reice Griffith kick (Drive: 4 plays, 28 yards, 1:29; Mercer 7–0)
- (10:00) WCU – David White 18-yard pass from Cole Gonzales, Richard McCollum kick (Drive: 2 plays, 18 yards, 0:13; Tied 7–7)
- (8:04) MER – Ty James 18-yard pass from Carter Peevy, Reice Griffith kick (Drive: 5 plays, 65 yards, 1:56; Mercer 14–7)
- (7:51) MER – Mic Wasson 24-yard fumble recovery, Reice Griffith kick (Mercer 21–7)

Second quarter

- (14:50) MER – Carter Peevy 4-yard run, Reice Griffith kick (Drive: 13 plays, 76 yards, 6:35; Mercer 28–7)
- (2:40) WCU – Branson Adams 12-yard pass from Cole Gonzales, Richard McCollum kick (Drive: 9 plays, 80 yards, 3:15; Mercer 28–14)

Third quarter

- (9:04) MER – Lance Wise 9-yard interception, Reice Griffith kick (Mercer 35–14)
- (2:58) WCU – Ajay Belanger 4-yard pass from Cole Gonzales, Richard McCollum kick (Drive: 13 plays, 92 yards, 5:57; Mercer 35–21)

Fourth quarter

- (14:52) WCU – Ajay Belanger 7-yard pass from Cole Gonzales, Richard McCollum kick (Drive: 4 plays, 51 yards, 1:20; Mercer 35–28)
- (12:02) MER – Reice Griffith 44-yard field goal (Drive: 8 plays, 48 yards, 2:50; Mercer 38–28)
- (8:08) WCU – Calvin Jones 20-yard pass from Cole Gonzales, Richard McCollum kick (Drive: 10 plays, 54 yards, 3:43; Mercer 38–35)
- (6:29) MER – Al Wooten II 17-yard run, Reice Griffith kick (Drive: 4 plays, 55 yards, 1:28; Mercer 45–35)
- (0:07) WCU – Richard McCollum 27-yard field goal (Drive: 9 plays, 60 yards, 1:28; Mercer 45–38)

Statistics	MER	WCU
First downs	26	24
Plays–yards	76–422	71–474
Rushes–yards	48–210	19–86
Passing yards	212	388
Passing: comp–att–int	18–28–1	32–52–3
Time of possession	33:35	26:25

Team	Category	Player	Statistics
Mercer	Passing	Carter Peevy	18/28, 212 yards, TD, INT
Mercer	Rushing	Al Wooten II	15 carries, 68 yards, TD
Mercer	Receiving	Ty James	6 receptions, 115 yards, TD
Western Carolina	Passing	Cole Gonzales	32/51, 388 yards, 5 TD, 3 INT
Western Carolina	Rushing	Branson Adams	9 carries, 46 yards
Western Carolina	Receiving	David White	5 receptions, 113 yards, TD

=== at The Citadel ===
	1	2	3	4	Total
Bears	7	7	10	14	38
Bulldogs	3	7	0	6	16

=== Samford ===
	1	2	3	4	Total
Bulldogs	0	7	7	7	21
Bears	6	0	15	7	28

== FCS Playoffs ==
=== Gardner–Webb – First Round ===
	1	2	3	4	Total
Runnin' Bulldogs	0	7	0	0	7
Bears	0	14	0	3	17

=== at No. 1 South Dakota State – Second Round ===
No. 17 Mercer at No. 1 South Dakota State
NCAA Division I Second Round

Team	1	2	3	4	Total
No. 17 Bears	0	0	0	0	0
• No. 1 Jackrabbits	3	21	7	10	41

- Date: December 2
- Location:
  Dana J. Dykhouse Stadium
  Brookings, SD
- Game start: 2:02 p.m. EST
- Elapsed time: 2:39
- Game attendance: 10,171
- Game weather: 37 °F (3 °C), Sunny, Wind S 20 mph (32 km/h)
- Referee: Gary Leeper
- Television network: ESPN+
- Source: Box Score

Statistics	MER	SDSU
First downs	6	24
Total yards	151	571
Rushing yards	76	346
Passing yards	75	225
Turnovers	2	1
Time of possession	24:34	35:26

Team	Category	Player	Statistics
Mercer	Passing	Carter Peevy	14/22, 75 yards, 2 INT
Mercer	Rushing	Chris Hill	1 carry, 24 yards
Mercer	Receiving	Ty James	2 receptions, 28 yards
South Dakota State	Passing	Mark Gronowski	11/16, 158 yards, TD, INT
South Dakota State	Rushing	Isaiah Davis	16 carries, 117 yards, 3 TD
South Dakota State	Receiving	Jaxon Janke	7 receptions, 106 yards, TD
