= George Quarles =

American football coach (born 1967)

Current position
- Title: Head coach
- Team: Webb School of Knoxville

Biographical details
- Born: March 24, 1967 (age 58); Jefferson City, Tennessee, U.S.

Playing career
- 1985–1988: Furman
- Position: Wide receiver

Coaching career (HC unless noted)
- 1989–1990: Furman (GA)
- 1991: Cedar Shoals HS (GA) (assistant)
- 1992–1994: Eastside HS (SC) (OC/QB/DB)
- 1995–1998: Maryville HS (TN) (OC/QB/DB)
- 1999–2016: Maryville HS (TN)
- 2017: Furman (AHC/TE)
- 2018–2021: Furman (AHC/OC/QB)
- 2022–2023: East Tennessee State
- 2024–2025: Austin Peay (TE)
- 2026–present: Webb School of Knoxville

Head coaching record
- Overall: 6–16 (college); 250–16 (high school)

George Quarles (born March 24, 1967) is an American college football coach who currently serves as the head football coach of Webb School of Knoxville. He was formerly the tight ends coach at Austin Peay, a position he has held from 2024 to 2025. He was the head football coach at East Tennessee State University from 2022 to 2023. Prior to East Tennessee State, he was the associate head coach, offensive coordinator, and quarterbacks coach at Furman University, where he played college football. Before he joined the Furman coaching staff, Quarles was the head coach at Maryville High School in Tennessee from 1999 to 2016, where he recorded a 250–16 record.

== Head coaching record ==
=== College ===
Year	Team	Overall	Conference	Standing	Bowl/playoffs
East Tennessee State (Southern Conference) (2022–2023)
2022	East Tennessee State	3–8	1–7	8th	
2023	East Tennessee State	3–8	2–6	T–7th	
East Tennessee State:		6–16	3–13		
Total:		6–16			
