= 2023 NCAA Division I FCS football season =

American college football season

2023 NCAA Division I FCS season

Regular season
- Number of teams: 128
- Duration: August 26 – December 2
- Payton Award: South Dakota State quarterback Mark Gronowski
- Buchanan Award: Tennessee State defensive end Terrell Allen

Playoff
- Duration: November 25 – December 16
- Championship date: January 7, 2024
- Championship site: Toyota Stadium, Frisco, Texas
- Champion: South Dakota State

NCAA Division I FCS football seasons
- «2022 2024»

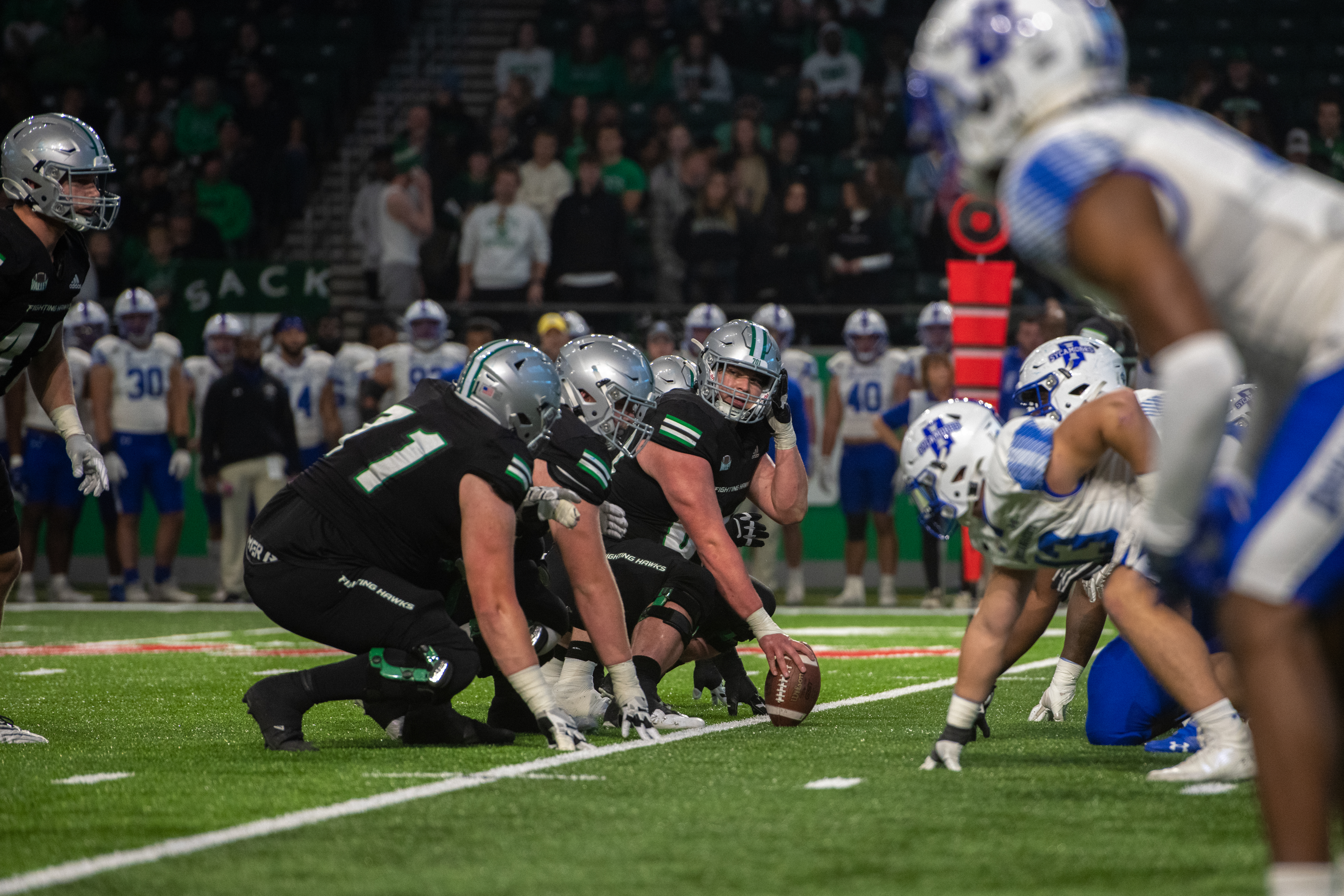
Missouri Valley Conference: North Dakota Hawks vs. Indiana State Sycamores

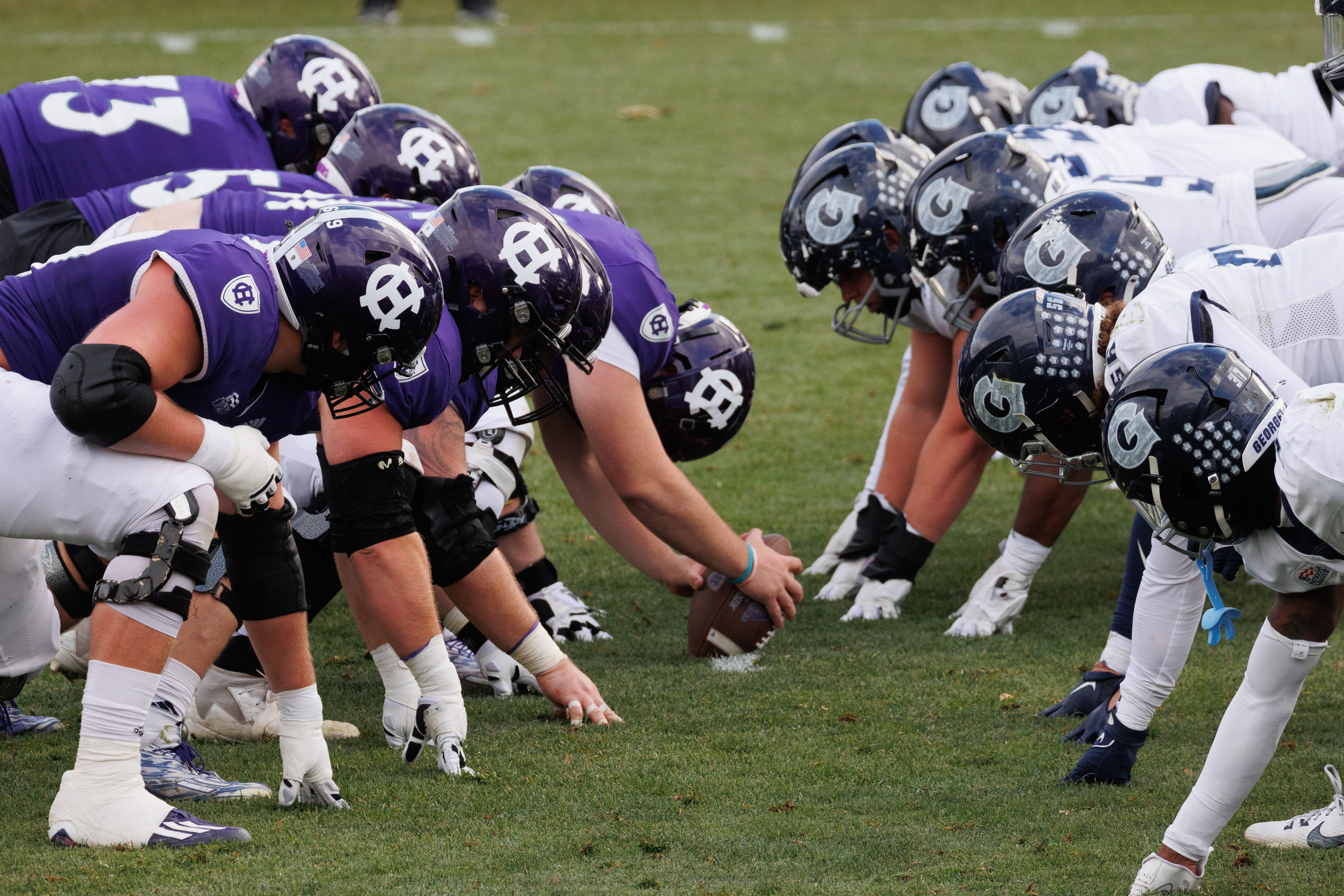
Patriot League: Georgetown Hoyas vs. Holy Cross Crusaders

The 2023 NCAA Division I FCS football season, part of college football in the United States, was conducted by the National Collegiate Athletic Association (NCAA) at the Division I Football Championship Subdivision (FCS) level. The regular season began on August 26 and ended in November. The postseason began in November and ended on January 7, 2024, with the 2024 NCAA Division I Football Championship Game at Toyota Stadium in Frisco, Texas. South Dakota State repeated as champions, defeating Montana, 23–3.

== Conference changes and new programs ==
- The Atlantic Sun Conference (ASUN) and Western Athletic Conference, which had created the WAC-ASUN Challenge in 2021, merged their football leagues effective in 2023. The partnership was formally rebranded as the United Athletic Conference (UAC), a football-only league separate from the two conferences. The NCAA denied the UAC's request to be classified as a single-sport FCS football conference, but continued to recognize the organization as an extension of the WAC-ASUN Challenge.
- The Big South Conference and Ohio Valley Conference also merged their football leagues effective in 2023, but without attempting to create a new independent league, instead adopting the name Big South–OVC Football Association. Like the ASUN and WAC, both conferences were in danger of falling below the minimum six members required to remain an automatic qualifier (AQ) for the FCS postseason.
- The Colonial Athletic Association, along with its (technically-separate) FCS football league, adopted the name Coastal Athletic Association, a change that did not affect the CAA branding.

School	2022 conference	2023 conference
Abilene Christian	WAC-ASUN Challenge (WAC)	UAC
Austin Peay	WAC-ASUN Challenge (ASUN)	UAC
Bryant	Big South	Big South–OVC
Campbell	Big South	CAA
Central Arkansas	WAC-ASUN Challenge (ASUN)	UAC
Charleston Southern	Big South	Big South–OVC
Eastern Illinois	Ohio Valley	Big South–OVC
Eastern Kentucky	WAC-ASUN Challenge (ASUN)	UAC
Gardner–Webb	Big South	Big South–OVC
Jacksonville State	ASUN (FCS)	C-USA (FBS)
Kennesaw State	WAC-ASUN Challenge (ASUN)	FCS Independent
Lindenwood	Ohio Valley	Big South–OVC
Murray State	Ohio Valley	MVFC
North Alabama	WAC-ASUN Challenge (ASUN)	UAC
North Carolina A&T	Big South	CAA
Robert Morris	Big South	Big South–OVC
Sam Houston State	WAC (FCS)	C-USA (FBS)
Southeast Missouri State	Ohio Valley	Big South–OVC
Southern Utah	WAC-ASUN Challenge (WAC)	UAC
Stephen F. Austin	WAC-ASUN Challenge (WAC)	UAC
Tarleton State	WAC	UAC
Tennessee State	Ohio Valley	Big South–OVC
Tennessee Tech	Ohio Valley	Big South–OVC
Utah Tech	WAC	UAC
UT Martin	Ohio Valley	Big South–OVC

== Notable headlines ==
- October 4 – The NCAA announced several major changes to Division I football recruiting and governance rules:
  - The window for athletes to enter the transfer portal was reduced. For FCS players, the portal now opens on the Monday after the selection of the playoff field, and stays open for 30 days. For players participating in the FCS playoffs or the Celebration Bowl, there will be an additional 5-day window after the players' final game.
  - The limit on "initial counters"—i.e., players who are receiving athletically-related financial aid for the first time—was permanently eliminated. The previous FCS limit of 30 had been suspended due to COVID-19 impacts.
  - The application fee for transitioning from FCS to FBS increased from $5,000 to $5 million, effective immediately.
- October 12 – Northwestern State junior safety Ronnie Caldwell died after being shot multiple times near the school's Natchitoches, Louisiana campus. Two weeks after the shooting, Northwestern State canceled the remainder of its season, and head coach Brad Laird resigned.

== FCS team wins over FBS teams ==
Italics denotes FBS teams.

Date	Visiting team	Home team	Site	Result	Attendance	Ref.
September 9	No. 24 Southern Illinois	Northern Illinois	Huskie Stadium • DeKalb, Illinois	14–11	13,114	
September 9	Fordham	Buffalo	UB Stadium • Amherst, New York	40–37	15,854	
September 9	No. 7 Idaho	Nevada	Mackay Stadium • Reno, Nevada	33–6 (Note: Idaho was a 5.5-point favorite at kickoff.)	19,852	
September 16	No. 8 Sacramento State	Stanford	Stanford Stadium • Stanford, California	30–23	23,848	
^{#}Rankings from STATS poll released prior to the game.

== Conference standings ==
2023 Big Sky Conference football standings
	Conf.			Overall
Team	W		L	W		L
No. 2 Montana $^	7	–	1	13	–	2
No. 8 Idaho ^	6	–	2	9	–	4
No. 9 Montana State ^	6	–	2	8	–	4
Northern Arizona	5	–	3	5	–	6
No. 24 UC Davis	5	–	3	7	–	4
No. 13 Sacramento State ^	4	–	4	8	–	5
Portland State	4	–	4	5	–	6
Weber State	4	–	4	6	–	5
Eastern Washington	3	–	5	4	–	7
Idaho State	3	–	5	3	–	8
Cal Poly	1	–	7	3	–	8
Northern Colorado	0	–	8	0	–	11
$ – Conference champion; ^ – FCS playoff participant; Rankings from STATS Poll

2023 Big South–OVC football standings
	Conf.			Overall
Team	W		L	W		L
Gardner–Webb +^	5	–	1	7	–	5
No. 25 UT Martin +	5	–	1	8	–	3
Eastern Illinois	4	–	2	8	–	3
Bryant	4	–	2	6	–	5
Southeast Missouri State	3	–	3	4	–	7
Tennessee Tech	2	–	4	4	–	7
Robert Morris	2	–	4	4	–	7
Charleston Southern	2	–	4	4	–	7
Tennessee State	2	–	4	6	–	5
Lindenwood *	1	–	5	3	–	7
+ – Conference co-champions; ^ – FCS playoff participant; Note: Lindenwood ineligible for Big South–OVC title and FCS postseason play due to transition from NCAA Division II.; Rankings from STATS Poll

2023 Coastal Athletic Association Football Conference standings
	Conf.			Overall
Team	W		L	W		L
No. 5 Albany +^	7	–	1	11	–	4
No. 6 Villanova +^	7	–	1	10	–	3
No. 15 Richmond +^	7	–	1	9	–	4
No. 10 Delaware ^	6	–	2	9	–	4
Elon	6	–	2	6	–	5
New Hampshire	4	–	4	6	–	5
Rhode Island	4	–	4	6	–	5
William & Mary	4	–	4	6	–	5
Campbell	4	–	4	5	–	6
Towson	4	–	4	5	–	6
Hampton	3	–	5	5	–	6
Monmouth	3	–	5	4	–	7
Maine	1	–	7	2	–	9
North Carolina A&T	0	–	8	1	–	10
Stony Brook	0	–	8	0	–	10
+ – Conference co-champions; ^ – FCS playoff participant; Rankings from STATS Poll

2023 Ivy League football standings
	Conf.			Overall
Team	W		L	W		L
Harvard +	5	–	2	8	–	2
Yale +	5	–	2	7	–	3
Dartmouth +	5	–	2	6	–	4
Princeton	4	–	3	5	–	5
Brown	3	–	4	5	–	5
Penn	3	–	4	6	–	4
Cornell	2	–	5	3	–	7
Columbia	1	–	6	3	–	7
+ – Conference co-champions; Rankings from STATS Poll

2023 Mid-Eastern Athletic Conference football standings
	Conf.			Overall
Team	W		L	W		L
Howard +	4	–	1	6	–	6
No. 20 North Carolina Central +^	4	–	1	9	–	3
South Carolina State	3	–	2	5	–	6
Morgan State	3	–	2	4	–	6
Norfolk State	1	–	4	3	–	8
Delaware State	0	–	5	1	–	10
+ – Conference co-champions; ^ – FCS playoff participant; Rankings from STATS Poll

2023 Missouri Valley Football Conference standings
	Conf.			Overall
Team	W		L	W		L
No. 1 South Dakota State $^	8	–	0	15	–	0
No. 4 South Dakota ^	7	–	1	10	–	3
No. 3 North Dakota State ^	5	–	3	11	–	4
No. 19 Youngstown State ^	5	–	3	8	–	5
No. 16 North Dakota ^	5	–	3	7	–	5
Northern Iowa	5	–	3	6	–	5
No. 12 Southern Illinois ^	4	–	4	8	–	5
Illinois State	4	–	4	6	–	5
Missouri State	3	–	5	4	–	7
Murray State	1	–	7	2	–	9
Indiana State	1	–	7	1	–	10
Western Illinois	0	–	8	0	–	11
$ – Conference champion; ^ – FCS playoff participant; Rankings from STATS Poll

2023 Northeast Conference football standings
	Conf.			Overall
Team	W		L	W		L
Duquesne $^	6	–	1	7	–	5
Saint Francis (PA)	4	–	3	4	–	6
Merrimack	4	–	3	5	–	6
Stonehill *	4	–	3	5	–	5
LIU	4	–	3	4	–	7
Wagner	3	–	4	4	–	7
Sacred Heart	2	–	5	2	–	9
Central Connecticut	1	–	6	3	–	8
$ – Conference champion; ^ – FCS playoff participant; Note: Stonehill ineligible for NEC title and FCS postseason play due to transition from NCAA Division II; Rankings from STATS Poll

2023 Patriot League football standings
	Conf.			Overall
Team	W		L	W		L
No. 21 Lafayette +^	5	–	1	9	–	3
Holy Cross +	5	–	1	7	–	4
Colgate	4	–	2	6	–	5
Georgetown	3	–	3	5	–	6
Fordham	2	–	4	6	–	5
Lehigh	1	–	5	2	–	9
Bucknell	1	–	5	4	–	7
+ – Conference co-champions; ^ – FCS playoff participant; Rankings from STATS Poll

2023 Pioneer Football League standings
	Conf.			Overall
Team	W		L	W		L
Drake $^	8	–	0	8	–	4
St. Thomas (MN) *	7	–	1	8	–	3
Davidson	6	–	2	7	–	4
Butler	5	–	3	7	–	4
Marist	4	–	4	4	–	7
San Diego	4	–	4	4	–	7
Morehead State	3	–	5	4	–	7
Presbyterian	2	–	6	4	–	7
Valparaiso	2	–	6	3	–	8
Dayton	2	–	6	4	–	7
Stetson	1	–	7	3	–	8
$ – Conference champion; ^ – FCS playoff participant; * – St. Thomas (MN) ineligible for FCS postseason play due to transition from NCAA Division III; Rankings from STATS Poll

2023 Southern Conference football standings
	Conf.			Overall
Team	W		L	W		L
No. 7 Furman $^	7	–	1	10	–	3
No. 14 Chattanooga ^	6	–	2	8	–	5
No. 17 Mercer ^	6	–	2	9	–	4
No. 23 Western Carolina	5	–	3	7	–	4
Samford	4	–	4	6	–	5
VMI	4	–	4	5	–	6
East Tennessee State	2	–	6	3	–	8
Wofford	2	–	6	2	–	9
The Citadel	0	–	8	0	–	11
$ – Conference champion; ^ – FCS playoff participant; Rankings from STATS Poll

2023 Southland Conference football standings
	Conf.			Overall
Team	W		L	W		L
Nicholls $^	7	–	0	6	–	5
No. 22 Incarnate Word	6	–	1	8	–	2
Lamar	5	–	2	6	–	5
Houston Christian	4	–	3	5	–	5
Southeastern Louisiana	3	–	4	3	–	8
Texas A&M–Commerce *	2	–	5	1	–	9
McNeese	1	–	6	0	–	10
Northwestern State **	0	–	2	0	–	6
$ – Conference champion; ^ – FCS playoff participant; * – Texas A&M–Commerce ineligible for FCS postseason play due to transition from NCAA Division II. ** – Northwestern State canceled its season on October 26.; Rankings from STATS Poll

2023 Southwestern Athletic Conference football standings
	Conf.			Overall
Team	W		L	W		L
East Division
No. 11 Florida A&M xy$	8	–	0	12	–	1
Alabama State	5	–	3	7	–	4
Jackson State	5	–	3	7	–	4
Alabama A&M	3	–	5	5	–	6
Bethune–Cookman	2	–	6	3	–	8
Mississippi Valley State	1	–	7	1	–	10
West Division
Prairie View A&M xy	6	–	2	6	–	6
Alcorn State x	6	–	2	7	–	4
Southern	5	–	3	6	–	5
Grambling State	4	–	4	5	–	6
Texas Southern	2	–	6	3	–	8
Arkansas–Pine Bluff	1	–	7	2	–	9
Championship: Florida A&M 35, Prairie View A&M 14
$ – Conference champion; x – Division champion/co-champions; y – Championship game participant; Rankings from STATS Poll

2023 United Athletic Conference standings
	Conf.			Overall
Team	W		L	W		L
No. 18 Austin Peay $^	6	–	0	9	–	3
Central Arkansas	4	–	2	7	–	4
Southern Utah	4	–	2	6	–	5
Eastern Kentucky	4	–	2	5	–	6
Tarleton State*	4	–	2	8	–	3
Abilene Christian	3	–	3	5	–	6
North Alabama	1	–	5	3	–	8
Utah Tech*	1	–	5	2	–	9
Stephen F. Austin	0	–	6	3	–	8
$ – Conference champion; Note: Tarleton State and Utah Tech are ineligible for the UAC title and FCS postseason play due to transitions from NCAA Division II.; Rankings from STATS Poll

2023 NCAA Division I FCS independents football standings
	Conf.			Overall
Team	W		L	W		L
Kennesaw State*		–		3	–	6
* Note: Kennesaw State ineligible for FCS postseason play due to start of transition to FBS.; Rankings from AP Poll

== Playoff qualifiers ==
=== Automatic berths for conference champions ===
Conference	Team	Appearance	Last bid	Result of last appearance
Big Sky Conference	Montana	27th	2022	Second round - (L - North Dakota State)
Big South–OVC	Gardner–Webb	2nd	2022	Second round - (L - William & Mary)
CAA Football	Villanova	15th	2021	Quarterfinal - (L - South Dakota State)
Missouri Valley Football Conference	South Dakota State	13th	2022	National champions (W - North Dakota State)
Northeast Conference	Duquesne	3rd	2018	Second round - (L - South Dakota State)
Patriot League	Lafayette	5th	2013	First round - (L - New Hampshire)
Pioneer Football League	Drake	1st	None	None
Southern Conference	Furman	20th	2022	Second round - (L - Incarnate Word)
Southland Conference	Nicholls	7th	2019	Second round - (L - North Dakota State)
United Athletic Conference	Austin Peay	2nd	2019	Quarterfinals - (L - Montana State)

=== At large qualifiers ===
Conference	Team	Appearance	Last bid	Result of last appearance
Big Sky Conference	Idaho	13th	2022	First round (L - Southeastern Louisiana)
Big Sky Conference	Montana State	13th	2022	Semifinal (L - South Dakota State)
Big Sky Conference	Sacramento State	4th	2022	Quarterfinal (L - Incarnate Word)
CAA Football	Albany	3rd	2019	Second round (L - Montana State)
CAA Football	Delaware	19th	2022	Second round (L - South Dakota State)
CAA Football	Richmond	13th	2022	Second round (L - Sacramento State)
Missouri Valley Football Conference	North Dakota	5th	2022	First round (L - Weber State)
Missouri Valley Football Conference	North Dakota State	14th	2022	National Runner-up (L - South Dakota State)
Missouri Valley Football Conference	South Dakota	3rd	2021	First round (L - Southern Illinois)
Missouri Valley Football Conference	Southern Illinois	11th	2021	Second round (L - North Dakota State)
Missouri Valley Football Conference	Youngstown State	13th	2016	National Runner-up (L - James Madison)
Mid-Eastern Athletic Conference	North Carolina Central	1st	None	None
Southern Conference	Chattanooga	5th	2016	Second round (L - Sam Houston State)
Southern Conference	Mercer	1st	None	None

=== Abstentions ===
- Ivy League – Harvard, Yale
- Mid-Eastern Athletic Conference – Howard
- Southwestern Athletic Conference – Florida A&M

== Postseason ==
The FCS again featured a 24-team postseason bracket: 10 teams decided via automatic bids issued to conference champions, and 14 at-large bids (see above). The top eight teams were seeded and received a bye to the second round.

=== Bowl game ===
Date	Time (EST)	Game	Site	Television	Teams	Affiliations	Results
Dec. 16	12:00 p.m.	Celebration Bowl	Mercedes-Benz Stadium; Atlanta, Georgia	USA: ABC; Canada: TSN2	Florida A&M (11–1); Howard (6–5)	SWAC; MEAC	Florida A&M 30; Howard 26

=== NCAA Division I playoff bracket ===
First Round; November 25; Campus sites ESPN+
Gardner–Webb	7
Mercer	17
Duquesne	7
Youngstown State	40
North Carolina Central	27
Richmond	49
Nicholls	0
Southern Illinois	35
Sacramento State	42
North Dakota	35
Drake	3
North Dakota State	66
Chattanooga	24
Austin Peay	21
Lafayette	34
Delaware	36

Second Round; December 2 Campus sites ESPN+
1	South Dakota State	41
Mercer	0
8	Villanova	45
Youngstown State	28
5	Albany	41
Richmond	13
4	Idaho	20^{OT}
Southern Illinois	17
3	South Dakota	34
Sacramento State	24
6	Montana State	34
North Dakota State	35^{OT}
7	Furman	26
Chattanooga	7
2	Montana	49
Delaware	19

Quarterfinals; December 8/9; Campus sites ABC, ESPN Networks
1	South Dakota State	23
8	Villanova	12
5	Albany	30
4	Idaho	22
3	South Dakota	17
North Dakota State	45
7	Furman	28
2	Montana	35^{OT}

Semifinals; December 15/16; Campus sites ESPN2
1	South Dakota State	59
5	Albany	0
North Dakota State	29
2	Montana	31^{2OT}

National Championship; January 7; 2 p.m. EST; Toyota Stadium, Frisco, Texas; ABC, ESPN+
1	South Dakota State	23
2	Montana	3

== Rankings ==
The top 25 from the Stats Perform and USA Today Coaches Polls.

=== Pre-season polls ===
Stats Perform
Ranking	Team
1	South Dakota State (56)
2	North Dakota State
3	Montana State
4	William & Mary
5	Holy Cross
6	Furman
7	Incarnate Word
8	Idaho
9	Samford
10	Sacramento State
11	New Hampshire
12	Southeast Missouri State
13	Weber State
14	Montana
15	Southeastern Louisiana
16	UC Davis
17	North Dakota
18	Richmond
19	North Carolina Central
20	Mercer
21	Rhode Island
22	Delaware
23	Northern Iowa
24	Eastern Kentucky
25	Gardner–Webb

USA Today Coaches
Ranking	Team
1	South Dakota State (24)
2	North Dakota State (1)
3	Montana State
4	William & Mary
5	Holy Cross
6	Furman
7	Incarnate Word
8	Sacramento State
9	Samford
10	Weber State
11	Southeast Missouri State
12	New Hampshire
13	Idaho
14	Montana
15	Southeastern Louisiana
16	Richmond
17	UC Davis
18	North Dakota
19	North Carolina Central
20	Northern Iowa
21	Delaware
22	Mercer
23	Rhode Island
24	Gardner–Webb
25	Florida A&M

== Kickoff games ==
The regular season began on Saturday, August 26 with three games in Week 0:

- FCS Kickoff (Cramton Bowl, Montgomery, Alabama): No. 20 Mercer 17, North Alabama 7
- Albany 34, Fordham 13
- MEAC/SWAC Challenge (Center Parc Stadium, Atlanta): Jackson State 37, South Carolina State 7

== Regular season top 10 matchups ==
Rankings reflect the Stats Perform Poll.

- Week 2
  - No. 1 South Dakota State defeated No. 3 Montana State, 20–16 (Dana J. Dykhouse Stadium, Brookings, SD)
- Week 4
  - No. 7 Idaho defeated No. 4 Sacramento State, 36–27 (Kibbie Dome, Moscow, ID)
  - No. 3 Montana State defeated No. 10 Weber State, 40–0 (Stewart Stadium, Ogden, UT)
- Week 7
  - No. 10 Montana defeated No. 3 Idaho, 23–21 (Kibbie Dome, Moscow, ID)
- Week 8
  - No. 2 Montana State defeated No. 3 Sacramento State, 42–30 (Hornet Stadium, Sacramento, CA)
  - No. 4 Furman defeated No. 8 Western Carolina, 29–17 (Bob Waters Field at E. J. Whitmire Stadium, Cullowhee, NC)
- Week 9
  - No. 1 South Dakota State defeated No. 4 South Dakota, 37–3 (DakotaDome, Vermillion, SD)
  - No. 9 Idaho defeated No. 2 Montana State, 24–21 (Kibbie Dome, Moscow, ID)
- Week 10
  - No. 4 Montana defeated No. 7 Sacramento State, 34–7 (Washington–Grizzly Stadium, Missoula, MT)
  - No. 9 South Dakota defeated No. 10 Southern Illinois, 14–7 (Saluki Stadium, Carbondale, IL)
- Week 11
  - No. 6 South Dakota defeated No. 10 North Dakota, 14–10 (DakotaDome, Vermillion, SD)
- Week 12
  - No. 3 Montana defeated No. 4 Montana State, 37–7 (Washington-Grizzly Stadium, Missoula, MT)
  - No. 10 Villanova defeated No. 7 Delaware, 35–7 (Delaware Stadium, Newark, DE)

== Upsets ==
This section lists instances of unranked teams defeating ranked teams during the season.

=== Regular season ===
During the regular season, 33 unranked teams defeated ranked teams.

- September 2, 2023
  - Morgan State 17, No. 18 Richmond 10
- September 9, 2023
  - Western Carolina 30, No. 8 Samford 7
- September 16, 2023
  - Eastern Washington 40, No. 19 Southeastern Louisiana 29
- September 23, 2023
  - Northern Arizona 28, No. 13 Montana 14
  - Eastern Kentucky 41, No. 16 Southeast Missouri State 38
  - Chattanooga 47, No. 20 Samford 24
  - Eastern Washington 27, No. 15 UC Davis 24
- September 30, 2023
  - South Dakota 24, No. 2 North Dakota State 19
  - Elon 14, No. 5 William & Mary 6
  - Harvard 38, No. 6 Holy Cross 28
  - Towson 54, No. 14 New Hampshire 51
  - Albany 31, No. 16 Villanova 10
  - Northern Iowa 44, No. 23 Youngstown State 41
- October 7, 2023
  - Northern Arizona 27, No. 13 Weber State 10
  - Youngstown State 31, No. 6 Southern Illinois 3
- October 14, 2023
  - Idaho State 42, No. 21 Eastern Washington 41
  - UC Davis 17, No. 22 Weber State 16
  - New Hampshire 38, No. 24 Albany 31
- October 21, 2023
  - Towson 34, No. 13 William & Mary 24
  - Princeton 21, No. 18 Harvard 14
  - Northern Iowa 27, No. 11 North Dakota 0
  - Lafayette 38, No. 15 Holy Cross 35
- October 28, 2023
  - Mercer 45, No. 10 Western Carolina 38
  - Gardner–Webb 38, No. 14 UT Martin 34
  - Tarleton State 25, No, 18 Central Arkansas 23
  - Northern Arizona 38, No. 25 UC Davis 21
- November 4, 2023
  - Elon 33, No. 5 Delaware 27
  - Colgate 37, No. 20 Lafayette 34 ^{OT}
  - Nicholls 45, No. 8 Incarnate Word 32
- November 11, 2023
  - Weber State 31, No. 4 Idaho 29
  - Howard 50, No. 7 North Carolina Central 20
  - Missouri State 35, No. 15 Northern Iowa 16
- November 18, 2023
  - UC Davis 31, No. 8 Sacramento State 21
  - Samford 27, No. 19 UT Martin 17
  - Yale 23, No. 23 Harvard 18
  - Wofford 19, No. 2 Furman 13
  - VMI 27, No. 14 Western Carolina 24

== Coaching changes ==
=== Preseason and in-season ===
This is restricted to coaching changes that took place on or after May 1, 2023, and will include any changes announced after a team's last regularly scheduled games but before its playoff games. For coaching changes that occurred earlier in 2023, see 2022 NCAA Division I FCS end-of-season coaching changes.

School	Outgoing coach	Date	Reason	Replacement
Columbia	Al Bagnoli	August 4, 2023	Retired	Mark Fabish (interim)
Dartmouth	Buddy Teevens	September 19, 2023	Died	Sammy McCorkle (named full time on October 19)
Northwestern State	Brad Laird	October 26, 2023	Resigned	Weston Glaser (interim)
Southern	Eric Dooley	November 14, 2023	Fired	Terrence Graves (named full time on December 12)

=== End of season ===
This list includes coaching changes announced during the season that did not take effect until the end of the season.

School	Outgoing coach	Date	Reason	Replacement	Previous position
South Carolina State	Oliver Pough	August 24, 2023	Retired (effective at season's end)	Chennis Berry	Benedict head coach (2020–2023)
Stony Brook	Chuck Priore	November 13, 2023	Fired	Billy Cosh	Western Michigan offensive coordinator and quarterbacks coach (2023)
East Tennessee State	George Quarles	November 19, 2023	Fired	Tre Lamb	Gardner–Webb head coach (2020–2023)
Cornell	David Archer	November 19, 2023	Fired	Dan Swanstrom	Penn offensive coordinator (2022–2023)
Western Illinois	Myers Hendrickson	November 19, 2023	Fired	Joe Davis	Eastern Illinois offensive coordinator and quarterbacks coach (2022–2023)
Northern Arizona	Chris Ball	November 20, 2023	Fired	Brian Wright	Pittsburg State head coach (2020–2023)
Morehead State	Rob Tenyer	November 20, 2023	Contract not renewed	Jason Woodman	Fairmont State head coach (2013–2023)
Texas Southern	Clarence McKinney	November 20, 2023	Contract not renewed	Cris Dishman	Vegas Vipers defensive coordinator (2023)
Utah Tech	Paul Peterson	November 20, 2023	Fired	Lance Anderson	Boise State senior analyst (2023)
Tennessee Tech	Dewayne Alexander	November 21, 2023	Fired	Bobby Wilder	Old Dominion head coach (2009–2019)
Gardner–Webb	Tre Lamb	November 27, 2023	Hired by East Tennessee State	Cris Reisert	Tiffin head coach (2019–2023)
Grambling State	Hue Jackson	November 28, 2023	Fired	Mickey Joseph	Nebraska interim head coach (2022)
UC Davis	Dan Hawkins	November 28, 2023	Resigned	Tim Plough	California tight ends coach (2023)
Northwestern State	Weston Glaser (interim)	November 28, 2023	Permanent replacement	Blaine McCorkle	Belhaven head coach (2018–2023)
Marist	Jim Parady	November 29, 2023	Retired	Mike Willis	Princeton assistant head coach, offensive coordinator, and tight ends coach (2020–2023)
Columbia	Mark Fabish (interim)	December 2, 2023	Permanent replacement	Jon Poppe	Union (NY) head coach (2023)
Austin Peay	Scotty Walden	December 4, 2023	Hired by UTEP	Jeff Faris	UCLA tight ends coach (2022–2023)
Holy Cross	Bob Chesney	December 7, 2023	Hired by James Madison	Dan Curran	Merrimack head coach (2013–2023)
North Dakota State	Matt Entz	December 10, 2023	Hired as linebackers coach by USC	Tim Polasek	Wyoming offensive coordinator and offensive line coach (2021–2023)
Merrimack	Dan Curran	December 15, 2023	Hired by Holy Cross	Mike Gennetti	Merrimack assistant head coach and defensive coordinator (2011–2023)
Campbell	Mike Minter	December 18, 2023	Resigned	Braxton Harris	Houston Christian head coach (2023)
Alcorn State	Fred McNair	December 19, 2023	Contract not renewed	Cedric Thomas	Alcorn State defensive coordinator (2022–2023)
Florida A&M	Willie Simmons	January 1, 2024	Hired as running backs coach by Duke	James Colzie III	Florida A&M assistant head coach and cornerbacks coach (2023)
Murray State	Dean Hood	January 1, 2024	Retired	Jody Wright	South Carolina tight ends coach (2022–2023)
Houston Christian	Braxton Harris	January 2, 2024	Hired by Campbell	Jason Bachtel	Houston Christian offensive coordinator and quarterbacks coach (2023)
Mercer	Drew Cronic	January 9, 2024	Hired as offensive coordinator and quarterbacks coach by Navy	Mike Jacobs	Lenoir–Rhyne head coach (2020–2023)
Harvard	Tim Murphy	January 17, 2024	Retired	Andrew Aurich	Rutgers tight ends coach (2023)
Hampton	Robert Prunty	April 30, 2024	Fired	Trenton Boykin (initially full-season interim, name full time on October 16)	Hampton special teams coordinator and running backs coach (2020–2023)

== See also ==
- 2023 NCAA Division I FBS football season
- 2023 NCAA Division II football season
- 2023 NCAA Division III football season
- 2023 NAIA football season
- 2023 U Sports football season
- 2023 junior college football season
