= 2023 NCAA Division I FCS football rankings =

Rankings for the 2023 NCAA Division I FCS football season

- Season: 2023
- Postseason: Single-elimination
- Preseason No. 1: South Dakota State
- National champions: South Dakota State
- Conference with most teams in final poll: MVFC (6)

The 2023 National Collegiate Athletic Association (NCAA) Division I Football Championship Subdivision (FCS) football rankings consists of two human polls, in addition to various publications' preseason polls. Unlike the Football Bowl Subdivision (FBS), college football's governing body, the NCAA, bestows the national championship title through a 24-team tournament. The following weekly polls determine the top 25 teams at the NCAA Division I Football Championship Subdivision level of college football for the 2023 season. The STATS Poll is voted by media members while the Coaches Poll is determined by coaches at the FCS level.

== Legend ==
Legend
	Increase in ranking
	Decrease in ranking
	Not ranked previous week
	Selected for NCAA FCS Playoffs
(Italics)	Number of first place votes
(#–#)	Win–loss record
т	Tied with team above or below also with this symbol

== STATS Poll ==
	Preseason August 7	Week 1 September 4	Week 2 September 10	Week 3 September 18	Week 4 September 25	Week 5 October 2	Week 6 October 9	Week 7 October 16	Week 8 October 23	Week 9 October 30	Week 10 November 6	Week 11 November 13	Week 12 November 20	Final January 8	
1.	South Dakota State (56)	South Dakota State (1–0) (55)	South Dakota State (2–0) (52)	South Dakota State (3–0) (52)	South Dakota State (3–0) (54)	South Dakota State (4–0) (56)	South Dakota State (5–0) (56)	South Dakota State (6–0) (56)	South Dakota State (7–0) (56)	South Dakota State (8–0) (56)	South Dakota State (9–0) (56)	South Dakota State (10–0) (56)	South Dakota State (11–0) (56)	South Dakota State (15–0) (56)	1.
2.	North Dakota State	North Dakota State (1–0) (1)	North Dakota State (2–0) (3)	North Dakota State (3–0) (3)	North Dakota State (3–0) (2)	Montana State (4–1)	Montana State (4–1)	Montana State (5–1)	Montana State (6–1)	Furman (7–1)	Furman (8–1)	Furman (9–1)	Montana (10–1)	Montana (13–2)	2.
3.	Montana State	Montana State (1–0)	Montana State (1–1)	Montana State (2–1)	Montana State (3–1)	Idaho (4–1)	Idaho (5–1)	Sacramento State (5–1)	Furman (6–1)	Idaho (6–2)	Montana (8–1)	Montana (9–1)	South Dakota (9–2)	North Dakota State (11–4)	3.
4.	William & Mary	William & Mary (1–0)	William & Mary (2–0)	Sacramento State (3–0) (1)	Idaho (3–1)	Sacramento State (4–1)	Sacramento State (4–1)	Furman (5–1)	South Dakota (6–1)	Montana (7–1)	Idaho (7–2)	Montana State (8–2)	Idaho (8–3)	South Dakota (10–3)	4.
5.	Holy Cross	Holy Cross (1–0)	Idaho (2–0) (1)	William & Mary (3–0)	William & Mary (4–0)	Furman (3–1)	Furman (4–1)	Incarnate Word (5–1)	Delaware (6–1)	Delaware (7–1)	Montana State (7–2)	South Dakota (8–2)	Montana State (8–3)	Albany (11–4)	5.
6.	Furman	Furman (1–0)	Holy Cross (1–1)	Holy Cross (2–1)	Holy Cross (3–1)	Southern Illinois (4–0)	North Dakota State (4–1)	South Dakota (5–1)	Sacramento State (5–2)	Montana State (6–2)	South Dakota (7–2)	Idaho (7–3)	Villanova (9–2)	Villanova (10–3)	6.
7.	Incarnate Word	Idaho (1–0)	Furman (1–1)	Idaho (2–1)	Furman (3–1)	North Dakota State (3–1)	Incarnate Word (4–1)	Delaware (5–1)	Montana (6–1)	Sacramento State (6–2)	North Carolina Central (8–1)	Delaware (8–2)	Furman (9–2)	Furman (10–3)	7.
8.	Idaho	Samford (1–0)	Sacramento State (2–0)	Furman (2–1)	Sacramento State (3–1)	Incarnate Word (3–1)	Delaware (4–1)	Western Carolina (5–1)	Incarnate Word (6–1)	Incarnate Word (7–1)	Delaware (7–2)	Sacramento State (7–3)	North Dakota State (8–3)	Idaho (9–4)	8.
9.	Samford	Sacramento State (1–0)	Weber State (2–0)	Incarnate Word (2–1)	Incarnate Word (3–1)	Delaware (3–1)	Western Carolina (5–1)	Montana (6–1)	Idaho (5–2)	South Dakota (6–2)	Sacramento State (6–3)	North Dakota State (7–3)	Albany (9–3)	Montana State (8–4)	9.
10.	Sacramento State	Incarnate Word (0–1)	Incarnate Word (1–1)	Weber State (2–1)	Southern Illinois (3–0)	William & Mary (4–1)	South Dakota (4–1)	Idaho (5–2)	Western Carolina (5–2)	Southern Illinois (6–2)	North Dakota (6–3)	Villanova (8–2)	Florida A&M (10–1)	Delaware (9–4)	10.
11.	New Hampshire	New Hampshire (1–0)	New Hampshire (1–1)	New Hampshire (2–1)	Delaware (3–1)	Western Carolina (4–1)	William & Mary (4–2)	North Dakota (4–2)	Southern Illinois (5–2)	North Dakota State (6–2)	Southern Illinois (6–3)	Florida A&M (9–1)	Delaware (8–3)	Florida A&M (12–1)	11.
12.	Southeast Missouri State	Weber State (1–0)	Montana (2–0)	Southern Illinois (3–0)	North Dakota (2–1)	Holy Cross (3–2)	Holy Cross (4–2)	Southern Illinois (5–1)	North Dakota State (5–2)	North Carolina Central (7–1)	North Dakota State (6–3)	Albany (8–3)	North Dakota (7–4)	Southern Illinois (8–5)	12.
13.	Weber State	Montana (1–0)	Southeast Missouri State (1–1)	Montana (3–0)	Weber State (2–2)	Weber State (3–2)	Southern Illinois (4–1)	William & Mary (4–2)	North Carolina Central (6–1)	North Dakota (5–3)	Florida A&M (8–1) т	North Dakota (6–4)	Austin Peay (9–2)	Sacramento State (8–5)	13.
14.	Montana	Southeast Missouri State (0–1)	North Dakota (2–0)	North Dakota (2–1)	New Hampshire (2–2)	North Carolina Central (4–1)	North Carolina Central (5–1)	North Dakota State (4–2)	UT Martin (6–1)	Chattanooga (7–2)	Villanova (7–2) т	Western Carolina (7–3)	Southern Illinois (7–4)	Chattanooga (8–5)	14.
15.	Southeastern Louisiana	UC Davis (1–0)	Southern Illinois (2–0)	UC Davis (2–1)	North Carolina Central (3–1)	South Dakota (3–1)	North Dakota (3–2)	Holy Cross (4–2)	North Dakota (4–3)	Florida A&M (7–1)	Northern Iowa (6–3)	Austin Peay (8–2)	Sacramento State (7–4)	Richmond (9–4)	15.
16.	UC Davis	Southeastern Louisiana (0–1)	UC Davis (1–1)	Southeast Missouri State (1–2)	Villanova (3–1)	North Dakota (2–2)	Montana (5–1)	North Carolina Central (5–1)	Florida A&M (6–1)	Western Carolina (5–3)	Incarnate Word (7–2)	Southern Illinois (6–4)	North Carolina Central (9–2)	North Dakota (7–5)	16.
17.	North Dakota	North Dakota (1–0)	North Carolina Central (2–0)	Rhode Island (2–1)	Western Carolina (3–1)	Montana (4–1)	UT Martin (5–1)	UT Martin (5–1)	Chattanooga (6–2)	Villanova (6–2)	Western Carolina (6–3)	North Carolina Central (8–2)	Mercer (8–3)	Mercer (9–4)	17.
18.	Richmond	North Carolina Central (1–0)	Samford (1–1)	North Carolina Central (2–1)	Montana (3–1)	UT Martin (4–1)	Florida A&M (5–1)	Harvard (5–0)	Central Arkansas (5–2)	Northern Iowa (5–3)	Albany (7–3)	Chattanooga (7–3)	Chattanooga (7–4)	Austin Peay (9–3)	18.
19.	North Carolina Central	Delaware (1–0)	Southeastern Louisiana (0–2)	Delaware (2–1)	Eastern Washington (2–2)	Florida A&M (4–1)	Harvard (4–0)	Florida A&M (5–1)	Villanova (5–2)	Austin Peay (6–2)	Chattanooga (7–3)	UT Martin (8–2)	Incarnate Word (8–2)	Youngstown State (8–5)	19.
20.	Mercer	Mercer (1–1)	Mercer (2–1)	Samford (1–2)	Florida A&M (3–1)	UC Davis (3—2)	Central Arkansas (4–2)	Central Arkansas (5–2)	Austin Peay (5–2)	Lafayette (7–1)	Austin Peay (7–2)	Incarnate Word (7–2)	Lafayette (9–2)	North Carolina Central (9–3)	20.
21.	Rhode Island	Northern Iowa (1–0)	Rhode Island (1–1)	Mercer (2–1)	UC Davis (2–2)	Harvard (3–0)	Eastern Washington (2–3)	Chattanooga (5–2)	Lafayette (6–1)	UT Martin (6–2)	UT Martin (7–2)	Mercer (8–3)	Youngstown State (7–4)	Lafayette (9–3)	21.
22.	Delaware	Rhode Island (0–1)	Delaware (1–1)	Florida A&M (2–1)	UT Martin (3–1)	Eastern Washington (2–3)	Weber State (3–3)	Villanova (5–2)	William & Mary (4–3)	Youngstown State (5–3)	Youngstown State (6–3)	Northern Iowa (6–4)	Richmond (8–3)	Incarnate Word (8–2)	22.
23.	Northern Iowa	Florida A&M (1–0)	Florida A&M (1–1)	Western Carolina (2–1)	Youngstown State (2–1)	Central Arkansas (3–2)	Youngstown State (3–2)	UC Davis (4–3)	Northern Iowa (4–3)	Albany (6–3)	Mercer (7–3)	Harvard (8–1)	Western Carolina (7–4)	Western Carolina (7–4)	23.
24.	Eastern Kentucky	Southern Illinois (1–0)	Villanova (2–0)	Youngstown State (2–1)	Rhode Island (2–2)	Chattanooga (4–1)	Albany (4–2)	Austin Peay (4–2)	Youngstown State (4–3)	William & Mary (5–3)	Harvard (7–1)	Lafayette (8–2)	UT Martin (8–3)	UC Davis (7–4)	24.
25.	Gardner–Webb	Youngstown State (1–0)	Youngstown State (1–1)	Villanova (2–1)	Central Arkansas (2–2)	Elon (3–2)	Chattanooga (4–2)	Youngstown State (3–3)	UC Davis (4–3)	Mercer (6–3)	Lafayette (7–2)	Youngstown State (6–4)	UC Davis (7–4)	UT Martin (8–3)	25.
	Preseason August 7	Week 1 September 4	Week 2 September 10	Week 3 September 18	Week 4 September 25	Week 5 October 2	Week 6 October 9	Week 7 October 16	Week 8 October 23	Week 9 October 30	Week 10 November 6	Week 11 November 13	Week 12 November 20	Final January 8	
		Dropped: No. 18 Richmond; No. 24 Eastern Kentucky; No. 25 Gardner–Webb	Dropped: No. 21 Northern Iowa	Dropped: No. 19 Southeastern Louisiana	Dropped: No. 16 Southeast Missouri State; No. 20 Samford; No. 21 Mercer	Dropped: No. 14 New Hampshire; No. 16 Villanova; No. 23 Youngstown State; No. 24 Rhode Island	Dropped: No. 20 UC Davis; No. 25 Elon	Dropped: No. 21 Eastern Washington; No. 22 Weber State; No. 24 Albany	Dropped: No. 15 Holy Cross; No. 18 Harvard	Dropped: No. 18 Central Arkansas; No. 25 UC Davis	Dropped: No. 24 William & Mary	None	Dropped: No. 22 Northern Iowa; No. 23 Harvard	None	

== Coaches Poll ==
	Preseason August 14	Week 1 September 5	Week 2 September 10	Week 3 September 18	Week 4 September 25	Week 5 October 2	Week 6 October 9	Week 7 October 16	Week 8 October 23	Week 9 October 30	Week 10 November 6	Week 11 November 13	Week 12 November 20	Final January 8	
1.	South Dakota State (24)	South Dakota State (1–0) (25)	South Dakota State (2–0) (26)	South Dakota State (3–0) (26)	South Dakota State (3–0) (26)	South Dakota State (4–0) (26)	South Dakota State (5–0) (26)	South Dakota State (6–0) (26)	South Dakota State (7–0) (26)	South Dakota State (8–0) (25)	South Dakota State (9–0) (26)	South Dakota State (10–0) (26)	South Dakota State (11–0) (24)	South Dakota State (15–0) (23)	1.
2.	North Dakota State (1)	North Dakota State (1–0)	North Dakota State (2–0)	North Dakota State (3–0)	North Dakota State (3–0)	Montana State (4–1)	Montana State (4–1)	Montana State (5–1)	Montana State (6–1)	Furman (7–1)	Furman (8–1)	Furman (9–1)	Montana (10–1)	Montana (13–2)	2.
3.	Montana State	Montana State (1–0)	Montana State (1–1)	Montana State (2–1)	Montana State (3–1)	Idaho (4–1)	Idaho (5–1)	Furman (5–1)	Furman (6–1)	Montana (7–1)	Montana (8–1)	Montana (9–1)	South Dakota (9–2)	North Dakota State (11–4)	3.
4.	William & Mary	William & Mary (1–0)	William & Mary (2–0)	Sacramento State (3–0)	William & Mary (4–0)	Furman (3–1)	Furman (4–1)	Sacramento State (5–1)	Incarnate Word (6–1)	Incarnate Word (7–1)	Idaho (7–2)	Montana State (8–2)	Idaho (8–3)	Idaho (9–4)т	4.
5.	Holy Cross	Holy Cross (1–0)	Holy Cross (1–1)	William & Mary (3–0)	Holy Cross (3–1)	Southern Illinois (4–0)	Sacramento State (4–1)	Incarnate Word (5–1)	Montana (6–1)	Idaho (6–2)	Montana State (7–2)	South Dakota (8–2)	Florida A&M (10–1)	South Dakota (10–3)т	5.
6.	Furman	Furman (1–0)	Sacramento State (2–0)	Holy Cross (2–1)	Idaho (3–1)	Incarnate Word (3–1)	Incarnate Word (4–1)	Montana (6–1)	Delaware (6–1)	Delaware (7–1)	South Dakota (7–2)	Delaware (8–2)	Furman (9–2)	Furman (10–3)	6.
7.	Incarnate Word	Samford (1–0)	Weber State (2–0)	Furman (2–1)	Furman (3–1)	Sacramento State (4–1)	North Dakota State (4–1)	Delaware (5–1)	Sacramento State (5–2)	Sacramento State (6–2)	North Carolina Central (8–1)	Florida A&M (9–1)	North Dakota State (8–3)	Albany (11–4)	7.
8.	Sacramento State	Sacramento State (1–0)	Furman (1–1)	Weber State (2–1)	Incarnate Word (3–1)	North Dakota State (3–1)	Delaware (4–1)	Idaho (5–2)	Idaho (5–2)	Montana State (6–2)	Delaware (7–2)	Idaho (7–3)	Montana State (8–3)	Montana State (8–4)	8.
9.	Samford	Weber State (1–0)	Incarnate Word (1–1)	Incarnate Word (2–1)	Sacramento State (3–1)	William & Mary (4–1)	North Carolina Central (5–1)	North Dakota (4–2)	South Dakota (6–1)	North Carolina Central (7–1)	Florida A&M (8–1)	North Dakota State (7–3)	Villanova (9–2)	Villanova (10–3)	9.
10.	Weber State	Incarnate Word (0–1)	Idaho (2–0)	Idaho (2–1)	Southern Illinois (3–0)	Delaware (3–1)	Montana (5–1)	North Carolina Central (5–1)	North Carolina Central (6–1)	North Dakota State (6–2)	Incarnate Word (7–2)	Sacramento State (7–3)	Austin Peay (9–2)	Florida A&M (12–1)	10.
11.	Southeast Missouri State	New Hampshire (1–0)	Montana (2–0) т	Montana (3–0)	North Dakota (2–1)	North Carolina Central (4–1)	Holy Cross (4–2)	Holy Cross (4–2)	North Dakota State (5–2)	Southern Illinois (6–2)	Sacramento State (6–3)	Incarnate Word (7–2)	Incarnate Word (8–2)	Delaware (9–4)	11.
12.	New Hampshire	Idaho (1–0)	New Hampshire (1–1) т	New Hampshire (2–1)	Delaware (3–1)	Holy Cross (3–2)	William & Mary (4–2)	Southern Illinois (5–1)	Southern Illinois (5–2)	South Dakota (6–2)	North Dakota (6–3)	Austin Peay (8–2)	Delaware (8–3)	Austin Peay (9–3)	12.
13.	Idaho	Montana (1–0)	North Dakota (2–0)	Southern Illinois (3–0)	North Carolina Central (3–1)	Montana (4–1)	Southern Illinois (4–1)	William & Mary (4–2)	UT Martin (6–1)	Chattanooga (7–2) т	North Dakota State (6–3)	UT Martin (8–2)	North Carolina Central (9–2)	Southern Illinois (8–5)	13.
14.	Montana	UC Davis (1–0)	Samford (1–1)	North Dakota (2–1)	Weber State (2–2)	Weber State (3–2)	Western Carolina (5–1)	Western Carolina (5–1)	Florida A&M (6–1)	Florida A&M (7–1) т	Austin Peay (7–2)	North Carolina Central (8–2)	North Dakota (7–4)	Incarnate Word (9–2)	14.
15.	Southeastern Louisiana	North Dakota (1–0)	Southeast Missouri State (1–1)	UC Davis (2–1)	Fordham (3–1)	North Dakota (2–2)	North Dakota (3–2)	North Dakota State (4–2)	Chattanooga (6–2)	North Dakota (5–3)	Southern Illinois (6–3)	Villanova (8–2)	Albany (9–3)	Sacramento State (8–5)	15.
16.	Richmond	Southeast Missouri State (0–1)	UC Davis (1–1)	Delaware (2–1)	Montana (3–1)	Florida A&M (4–1)	Florida A&M (5–1)	South Dakota (5–1)	Western Carolina (5–2)	Lafayette (7–1)	UT Martin (7–2)	Chattanooga (7–3)	Sacramento State (7–4)	North Dakota (7–5)	16.
17.	UC Davis	Southeastern Louisiana (0–1)	North Carolina Central (2–0)	Samford (1–2)	New Hampshire (2–2)	Western Carolina (4–1)	South Dakota (4–1)	Harvard (5–0)	North Dakota (4–3)	Austin Peay (6–2)	Chattanooga (7–3)	North Dakota (6–4)	Southern Illinois (7–4)	Chattanooga (8–5)	17.
18.	North Dakota	North Carolina Central (1–0)	Southern Illinois (2–0)	Rhode Island (2–1)	Florida A&M (3–1)	UC Davis (3–2)	Harvard (4–0)	Florida A&M (5–1)	Central Arkansas (5–2)	UT Martin (6–2)	Villanova (7–2)	Western Carolina (7–3)	Lafayette (9–2)	North Carolina Central (9–3)	18.
19.	North Carolina Central	Delaware (1–0)	Delaware (1–1)	North Carolina Central (2–1)	Youngstown State (2–1)	Harvard (3–0)	UT Martin (5–1)	UT Martin (5–1)	Lafayette (6–1)	Harvard (6–1)	Harvard (7–1)	Harvard (8–1)	Chattanooga (7–4)	Lafayette (9–3)	19.
20.	Northern Iowa	Northern Iowa (0–1)	Rhode Island (1–1)	Southeast Missouri State (1–2)	UC Davis (2–2)	Chattanooga (4–1)	Chattanooga (4–2) т	Chattanooga (5–2)	Austin Peay (5–2) т	Western Carolina (5–3)	Northern Iowa (6–3)	Central Arkansas (7–3) т	Mercer (8–3)	Mercer (9–4)	20.
21.	Delaware	Florida A&M (1–0)	Mercer (2–1)	Mercer (2–1)	Western Carolina (3–1)	South Dakota (3–1)	Youngstown State (3–2) т	Central Arkansas (5–2)	New Hampshire (4–3) т	Holy Cross (5–3)	Western Carolina (6–3)	Southern Illinois (6–4) т	UT Martin (8–3)	Youngstown State (8–5)	21.
22.	Mercer	Rhode Island (0–1)	Fordham (2–1) т	Fordham (2–1)	Chattanooga (3–1)	Illinois State (3–1)	Rhode Island (4–2)	New Hampshire (3–3)	Holy Cross (4–3)	Villanova (6–2)	Holy Cross (6–3)	Lafayette (8–2)	Holy Cross (7–4)	Richmond (9–4)	22.
23.	Rhode Island	Southern Illinois (1–0)	Southeastern Louisiana (0–2) т	Florida A&M (2–1)	Villanova (3–1)	UT Martin (4–1)	Weber State (3–3)	UC Davis (4–3)	Harvard (5–1)	Northern Iowa (5–3)	Lafayette (7–2)	Albany (8–3)	Youngstown State (7–4)	UT Martin (8–3)	23.
24.	Gardner-Webb	Mercer (1–1)	Florida A&M (1–1)	Youngstown State (2–1)	Harvard (2–0)	New Hampshire (2–3)	New Hampshire (2–3)	Austin Peay (4–2)	William & Mary (4–3)	William & Mary (5–3)	Central Arkansas (6–3)	Mercer (8–3)	Eastern Illinois (8–3)	Eastern Illinois (8–3)	24.
25.	Florida A&M	Youngstown State (1–0)	Illinois State (2–0)	Harvard (1–0)	Eastern Washington (2–2)	Eastern Illinois (4–1) т Rhode Island (3–2) т	Central Arkansas (4–2)	Illinois State (4–2)	UC Davis (4–3)	Central Arkansas (5–3)	Albany (7–3)	Holy Cross (6–4)	Richmond (8–3)	Holy Cross (7–4)	25.
	Preseason August 14	Week 1 September 5	Week 2 September 10	Week 3 September 18	Week 4 September 25	Week 5 October 2	Week 6 October 9	Week 7 October 16	Week 8 October 23	Week 9 October 30	Week 10 November 6	Week 11 November 13	Week 12 November 20	Final January 8	
		Dropped: No. 16 Richmond; No. 24 Gardner–Webb	Dropped: No. 20 Northern Iowa; No. 25 Youngstown State	Dropped: No. 22т Southeastern Louisiana; No. 25 Illinois State	Dropped: No. 17 Samford; No. 18 Rhode Island; No. 20 Southeast Missouri State; No. 21 Mercer	Dropped: No. 15 Fordham; No. 19 Youngstown State; No. 23 Villanova; No. 25 Eastern Washington	Dropped: No. 18 UC Davis; No. 22 Illinois State; No. 25t Eastern Illinois	Dropped: No. 20т Youngstown State; No. 22 Rhode Island; No. 23 Weber State	Dropped: No. 25 Illinois State	Dropped: No. 20t New Hampshire; No. 25 UC Davis	Dropped: No. 24 William & Mary	Dropped: No. 20 Northern Iowa	Dropped: No. 18 Western Carolina; No. 19 Harvard; No. 20т Central Arkansas	None	
