= Sacramento State Hornets football statistical leaders =

The Sacramento State Hornets football statistical leaders are individual statistical leaders of the Sacramento State Hornets football program in various categories, including passing, rushing, receiving, total offense, defensive stats, and kicking. Within those areas, the lists identify single-game, single-season, and career leaders. The Hornets represent California State University, Sacramento in the NCAA's Mid-American Conference.

Sacramento began competing in intercollegiate football in 1954. These lists are dominated by more recent players for several reasons:

- The NCAA didn't allow freshmen to play varsity football until 1972 (with the exception of the World War II years), allowing players to have four-year careers.
- Bowl games only began counting toward single-season and career statistics in 2002.

These lists are updated through the end of the 2025 season.

== Passing ==
=== Passing yards ===
Career
Rk	Player	Yards	Years
1	Garrett Safron	9,713	2011 2012 2013 2014
2	Ryan Leadingham	8,376	2001 2002 2003 2004
3	Kevin Thomson	6,424	2017 2018 2019
4	Jake Dunniway	5,575	2019 2021 2022
5	Jason Smith	5,357	2007 2008 2009
6	Mike Sullivan	5,085	1981 1982 1983
7	Tony Corbin	4,866	1995 1996
8	Ricky Ray	4,622	1999 2000
9	Greg Knapp	3,806	1982 1983 1984 1985
10	Drew Wyant	3,800	1986 1987 1988 1989

Single season
Rk	Player	Yards	Year
1	Garrett Safron	3,490	2014
2	Garrett Safron	3,289	2013
3	Kevin Thomson	3,216	2019
4	Carson Conklin	2,876	2024
5	Ryan Leadingham	2,785	2002
6	Ryan Leadingham	2,752	2001
7	Jake Dunniway	2,576	2021
8	Garrett Safron	2,540	2012
9	Tony Corbin	2,532	1995
10	Ricky Ray	2,422	1999

Single game
Rk	Player	Yards	Year	Opponent
1	Garrett Safron	554	2013	Portland State
2	Garrett Safron	463	2014	Montana State
3	Garrett Safron	425	2014	Southern Utah
4	Garrett Safron	412	2013	Montana
5	Tony Corbin	406	1995	Saint Mary's
6	Drew Wyant	397	1989	Santa Clara
7	Marcel Marquez	396	2006	Idaho State
	Jason Smith	396	2007	Eastern Washington
9	Carson Conklin	389	2024	UC Davis
10	Jake Dunniway	384	2019	Northern Arizona

=== Passing touchdowns ===
Career
Rk	Player	TDs	Years
1	Garrett Safron	86	2011 2012 2013 2014
2	Kevin Thomson	52	2017 2018 2019
3	Ryan Leadingham	50	2001 2002 2003 2004
4	Jason Smith	38	2007 2008 2009
5	Jake Dunniway	36	2019 2021 2022
6	Carson Conklin	34	2023 2024 2026
	Tony Corbin	34	1995 1996
	Mike Sullivan	34	1981 1982 1983
9	Ricky Ray	33	1999 2000
10	Greg Knapp	32	1982 1983 1984 1985

Single season
Rk	Player	TDs	Year
1	Garrett Safron	34	2014
2	Carson Conklin	28	2024
3	Kevin Thomson	27	2019
	Garrett Safron	27	2013
5	Jeff Fleming	23	2010
6	Garrett Safron	22	2012
7	Ricky Ray	20	1999
8	Jake Dunniway	19	2022
9	Kevin Thomson	17	2017
	Ryan Leadingham	17	2001
	Tony Corbin	17	1996
	Tony Corbin	17	1995

Single game
Rk	Player	TDs	Year	Opponent
1	Garrett Safron	7	2013	Southern Ore.
2	Ryan Leadingham	6	2003	Idaho St.
3	Carson Conklin	5	2024	UC Davis
	Kevin Thomson	5	2019	Northern Colo.
	Kevin Thomson	5	2017	Incarnate Word
	Garrett Safron	5	2014	Southern Utah
	Garrett Safron	5	2014	Montana St.
	Garrett Safron	5	2014	Incarnate Word
	Jeff Fleming	5	2010	Montana State
10	Jackson Sharman	4	2026	Mississippi Valley State
	Carson Conklin	4	2024	Portland State
	Carson Conklin	4	2024	Eastern Wash.
	Jake Dunniway	4	2019	Northern Ariz.
	Kevin Thomson	4	2019	Montana
	Kevin Thomson	4	2019	Southern Oregon
	Nate Ketteringham	4	2016	Cal Poly
	Nate Ketteringham	4	2016	Montana St.
	Nate Ketteringham	4	2015	NAU
	Nate Ketteringham	4	2015	Idaho State
	Garrett Safron	4	2014	UC Davis
	Garrett Safron	4	2013	Portland St.
	Garrett Safron	4	2013	Montana
	Garrett Safron	4	2013	Weber State
	Garrett Safron	4	2012	Cal Poly
	Jason Smith	4	2008	Northern Colo.
	Ryan Leadingham	4	2001	CSN
	Ricky Ray	4	1999	Montana
	Tony Corbin	4	1996	Cal Poly
	Tyler Jesse	4	1996	Portland State
	Drew Wyant	4	1989	Chico State
	Tony Trosin	4	1988	NC Central
	Rich Bergstrom	4	1969	Puget Sound
	Mike Lippi	4	1969	Nevada

== Rushing ==
=== Rushing yards ===
Career
Rk	Player	Yards	Years
1	Charles Roberts	6,553	1997 1998 1999 2000
2	John Farley	3,862	1980 1981 1982 1983
3	Bryan Hilliard	3,456	2007 2008 2010 2011
4	Jordan Robinson	2,826	2013 2014 2015 2016
5	Donald Hair	2,775	1985 1986 1987 1988
6	Troy Mills	2,771	1990 1991
7	Elijah Dotson	2,466	2017 2018 2019 2021
8	Rob Harrison	1,924	1985 1986
9	Garrett Safron	1,906	2011 2012 2013 2014
10	Cameron Skattebo	1,893	2021 2022

Single season
Rk	Player	Yards	Year
1	Charles Roberts	2,260	1998
2	Charles Roberts	2,082	1999
3	Troy Mills	1,668	1991
4	Charles Roberts	1,624	2000
5	Cameron Skattebo	1,373	2022
6	Rob Harrison	1,334	1986
7	Rodney Hammond, Jr.	1,213	2025
8	Michael Stewart	1,161	1995
9	Elijah Dotson	1,154	2018
10	John Farley	1,137	1982

Single game
Rk	Player	Yards	Year	Opponent
1	Charles Roberts	409	1999	ISU
2	Charles Roberts	277	1999	MSU
3	Bryan Hilliard	271	2008	Idaho State
4	Charles Roberts	269	1998	NAU
5	Rob Harrison	268	1986	So. Utah
6	Jordan Robinson	262	2016	Portland St.
7	Charles Roberts	251	1998	MSU
8	Rob Harrison	247	1986	Humboldt State
9	Charles Roberts	246	1998	EWU
10	Ryan Mole	245	2004	Montana State

=== Rushing touchdowns ===
Career
Rk	Player	TDs	Years
1	Charles Roberts	56	1997 1998 1999 2000
2	Bryan Hilliard	38	2007 2008 2010 2011
3	Donald Hair	30	1985 1986 1987 1988
	John Farley	30	1980 1981 1982 1983
5	Asher O'Hara	28	2021 2022
6	Jordan Robinson	25	2013 2014 2015 2016
	Troy Mills	25	1990 1991
8	Elijah Dotson	22	2017 2018 2019 2021
9	Kevin Thomson	21	2017 2018 2019
10	Marcus Fulcher	19	2019 2021 2022 2023

Single season
Rk	Player	TDs	Year
1	Charles Roberts	22	1999
2	Charles Roberts	19	1998
	Asher O'Hara	19	2022
4	Troy Mills	17	1991
5	Charles Roberts	14	2000
6	Rodney Hammond, Jr.	13	2025
	Jordan Robinson	13	2016
	John Farley	13	1982
9	Cardell Williams	12	2025
	Kevin Thomson	12	2019
	Bryan Hilliard	12	2010
	Bryan Hilliard	12	2008
	Donald Hair	12	1985

Single game
Rk	Player	TDs	Year	Opponent
1	Charles Roberts	5	1999	Idaho State
2	Kevin Thomson	4	2017	Southern Utah
	Jordan Robinson	4	2016	Portland State
	Bryan Hilliard	4	2008	Idaho State
	Charles Roberts	4	1999	Montana State
	Charles Roberts	4	1998	No. Arizona
	John Farley	4	1982	CS Northridge
	Jeff Truisdale	4	1979	CS Northridge

== Receiving ==
=== Receptions ===
Career
Rk	Player	Rec	Years
1	Fred Amey	248	2001 2002 2003 2004
2	Morris Norrise	214	2009 2010 2011 2012 2013
3	DeAndre Carter	207	2011 2012 2013 2014
4	Marshel Martin	192	2019 2021 2022 2023
5	Pierre Williams	182	20182019 2021 2022
6	Jared Gipson	147	2021 2022 2023 2024
7	Isiah Hennie	139	2014 2015 2016 2017
8	Shane Harrison	134	2011 2012 2013 2014 2015
9	Lamont Webb	119	1997 1998 1999 2000
10	Nnamdi Agude	112	2012 2013 2014 2015
	Tony Washington	112	2007 2008
	Ryan Coogler	112	2004 2005 2007

Single season
Rk	Player	Rec	Year
1	DeAndre Carter	99	2014
2	Tony Washington	83	2008
3	Morris Norrise	81	2013
4	Fred Amey	76	2004
5	Shane Harrison	71	2015
6	Elijah Dotson	70	2019
	Nnamdi Agude	70	2014
8	Marshel Martin	65	2022
9	DeAndre Carter	64	2013
10	Fred Amey	62	2002

Single game
Rk	Player	Rec	Year	Opponent
1	DeAndre Carter	16	2014	So. Utah
2	Fred Amey	15	2004	Eastern Wash.
3	DeAndre Carter	14	2014	Idaho State
	Tom Powell	14	1968	SF State
5	Marshel Martin	12	2022	Incarnate Word
	Shane Harrison	12	2015	Cal Poly
	DeAndre Carter	12	2013	Montana
	DeAndre Carter	12	2013	So. Oregon
	Tony Washington	12	2008	Montana
	Alex Estrada	12	1995	So. Utah

=== Receiving yards ===
Career
Rk	Player	Yards	Years
1	Fred Amey	4,049	2001 2002 2003 2004
2	Pierre Williams	2,971	20182019 2021 2022
3	DeAndre Carter	2,760	2011 2012 2013 2014
4	Morris Norrise	2,650	2009 2010 2011 2012 2013
5	Marshel Martin	2,373	2019 2021 2022 2023
6	Jared Gipson	2,218	2021 2022 2023 2024
7	Mike Carter	1,834	1968 1969
	Lamont Webb	1,834	1997 1998 1999 2000
9	Jaelin Ratliff	1,749	2015 2016 2017 2018
10	Nnamdi Agude	1,712	2012 2013 2014 2015

Single season
Rk	Player	Yards	Year
1	DeAndre Carter	1,321	2014
2	Tony Washington	1,279	2008
3	Kevin Fontes	1,207	1982
4	Fred Amey	1,186	2004
5	Nnamdi Agude	1,156	2014
6	Mike Carter	1,106	1969
7	Fred Amey	989	2003
	Fred Amey	989	2002
9	Clint Primm	951	1992
10	DeAndre Carter	934	2013

Single game
Rk	Player	Yards	Year	Opponent
1	DeAndre Carter	273	2014	So. Utah
2	Alex Estrada	228	1995	So. Utah
3	Ron Weaver	220	1989	Santa Clara
4	Ernest Campbell	206	2025	Montana
5	Tyrone Taylor	201	1996	Weber State
6	Mike Carter	199	1969	CS Hayward
7	Nnamdi Agude	197	2014	Montana St.
	Mitch Oliver	197	1995	UC Davis
9	Carlos Smith	189	1996	EWU
10	Eric Harrington	186	1993	Cal Poly

=== Receiving touchdowns ===
Career
Rk	Player	TDs	Years
1	DeAndre Carter	35	2011 2012 2013 2014
2	Marshel Martin	27	2019 2021 2022 2023
	Fred Amey	27	2001 2002 2003 2004
4	Pierre Williams	24	20182019 2021 2022
5	Morris Norrise	19	2009 2010 2011 2012 2013
6	Jared Gipson	17	2021 2022 2023 2024
	Mike Carter	17	1968 1969
8	Lamont Webb	16	1997 1998 1999 2000
9	Tony Washington	15	2007 2008
	Eric Harrington	15	1992 1993

Single season
Rk	Player	TDs	Year
1	DeAndre Carter	17	2014
2	DeAndre Carter	14	2013
	Mike Carter	14	1969
4	Marshel Martin	12	2022
	Tony Washington	12	2008
6	Mitch Oliver	11	1995
7	Nnamdi Agude	10	2014
8	Jared Gipson	9	2024
	Pierre Williams	9	2022
	Fred Amey	9	2002
	Eric Harrington	9	1993

Single game
Rk	Player	TDs	Year	Opponent
1	DeAndre Carter	5	2013	So. Oregon
2	DeAndre Carter	4	2014	So. Utah
	Chris Kelly	4	1999	Montana
4	Matt Coleman	3	2026	Mississippi Valley State
	Pierre Williams	3	2019	Southern Oregon
	Shane Harrison	3	2015	Northern Ariz.
	Shane Harrison	3	2015	Idaho State
	DeAndre Carter	3	2014	Montana St.
	DeAndre Carter	3	2014	Idaho State
	Morris Norrise	3	2010	Montana State
	Tony Washington	3	2008	UC Davis
	Mitch Oliver	3	1995	UC Davis
	Eric Harrington	3	1993	SFSU
	Eric Harrington	3	1992	Abeline Christ.
	Ron Weaver	3	1988	NC Central
	Mike Carter	3	1969	Nevada
	Mike Carter	3	1969	Cal Poly Pomona

== Total offense ==
Total offense is the sum of passing and rushing statistics. It does not include receiving or returns.

=== Total offense yards ===
Career
Rk	Player	Yards	Years
1	Garrett Safron	11,619	2011 2012 2013 2014
2	Ryan Leadingham	8,455	2001 2002 2003 2004
3	Kevin Thomson	7,671	2017 2018 2019
4	Charles Roberts	6,613	1997 1998 1999 2000
5	Jake Dunniway	5,632	2019 2021 2022
6	Jason Smith	5,332	2007 2008 2009
7	Mike Sullivan	4,908	1981 1982 1983
8	Ricky Ray	4,869	1999 2000
9	Tony Corbin	4,805	1995 1996
10	Lyle James	4,062	1966 1967 1968

Single season
Rk	Player	Yards	Year
1	Garrett Safron	4,241	2014
2	Kevin Thomson	3,835	2019
3	Garrett Safron	3,781	2013
4	Ryan Leadingham	2,955	2001
5	Garrett Safron	2,917	2012
6	Carson Conklin	2,857	2024
7	Ryan Leadingham	2,816	2002
8	Kaiden Bennett	2,767	2023
9	Jake Dunniway	2,627	2021
10	Tony Corbin	2,545	1995

Single game
Rk	Player	Yards	Year	Opponent
1	Garrett Safron	609	2014	Montana St.
2	Garrett Safron	596	2013	Portland St.
3	Garrett Safron	505	2013	Montana
4	Garrett Safron	461	2014	Idaho State
5	Garrett Safron	435	2014	So. Utah

=== Total touchdowns ===
Career
Rk	Player	TDs	Years
1	Garrett Safron	102	2011 2012 2013 2014
2	Kevin Thomson	73	2017 2018 2019
3	Charles Roberts	58	1997 1998 1999 2000
4	Ryan Leadingham	53	2001 2002 2003 2004
5	Ricky Ray	48	1999 2000
6	Asher O'Hara	46	2021 2022
7	Jason Smith	43	2007 2008 2009
8	Bryan Hilliard	38	2007 2008 2010 2011
	Mike Sullivan	38	1981 1982 1983
10	Jeff Fleming	37	2010 2011

Single season
Rk	Player	TDs	Year
1	Kevin Thomson	39	2019
2	Garrett Safron	38	2014
3	Garrett Safron	34	2013
4	Garrett Safron	31	2012
5	Asher O'Hara	30	2022
6	Carson Conklin	28	2024
7	Kevin Thomson	26	2017
8	Jeff Fleming	25	2010
	Ricky Ray	25	1999
10	Ricky Ray	23	2000

Single game
Rk	Player	Yards	Year	Opponent
1	Kevin Thomson	7	2017	Southern Utah
	Garrett Safron	7	2013	So. Oregon
3	Kevin Thomson	6	2019	Montana
	Garrett Safron	6	2013	Portland St.
	Garrett Safron	6	2013	Montana
	Jeff Fleming	6	2010	Montana State
	Ricky Ray	6	2000	CSN
	Ryan Leadingham	6	2003	Idaho St.

== Defense ==
=== Interceptions ===
Career
Rk	Player	Ints	Years
1	Pat Moloney	20	1968 1969 1970
2	Steve Tobias	15	1967 1968
3	Marvin Brown	13	1994 1995
	Bob Rocha	13	1967 1968 1969
5	Tim Brown	12	1987 1988 1989 1990
6	Osagoe Odiase	10	2010 2011 2012 2013
	Chad Johnson	10	1995 1996 1997
	Lorenzo Lynch	10	1985 1986
9	Brent Webber	9	2004 2005 2006 2007
	Brandon Coleman	9	1999 2000 2001 2002

Single season
Rk	Player	Ints	Year
1	Steve Tobias	10	1967
2	Pat Moloney	9	1970
	Pat Moloney	9	1969
	Bob Rocha	9	1969
5	Marvin Brown	7	1994
	Lorenzo Lynch	7	1986
	Marvin Welch	7	1967
8	Brent Webber	6	2006
	Chad Johnson	6	1996
	Marvin Brown	6	1995
	Jerome Washington	6	1980
	Mike Smith	6	1974
	Craig Johnson	6	1969

=== Tackles ===
Career
Rk	Player	Tackles	Years
1	Ryland Wickman	435	1995 1996 1997 1998
2	Todd Davis	351	2010 2011 2012 2013
3	Cyrus Mulitalo	336	2005 2006 2007 2008
4	Darnell Sankey	330	2012 2013 2014 2015
5	Brett Shelton	326	2004 2005 2006 2007
6	Immanuel Anderson	311	2015 2016 2017 2018
7	Matt Logue	306	2002 2003 2004 2005
8	Peter Buck	274	2007 2008 2009 2010
9	Mike Brannon	258	2005 2006 2007 2008
10	Brent Webber	249	2004 2005 2006 2007

Single season
Rk	Player	Tackles	Year
1	Ryland Wickman	154	1997
2	Darnell Sankey	153	2015
3	Rob Patton	136	1990
4	Jimmy Ellingson	132	2004
	Carlos Williams	132	1999
6	Todd Davis	131	2013
7	Cyrus Mulitalo	120	2006
8	Guy Pittman	116	1982
9	Jerry Haflich	113	1981
10	Immanuel Anderson	107	2016

=== Sacks ===
Career
Rk	Player	Sacks	Years
1	George Obinna	33.5	2015 2016 2017 2018 2019
2	Zack Nash	29.5	2008 2009 2010 2011
3	Mike Brannon	27.5	2005 2006 2007 2008
4	Kelly Osborn	25.5	1981 1982 1983 1984
5	Christian Clark	19.5	2007 2008 2009 2010
	Randy Rains	19.5	1985 1986 1987
7	Anthony Daisley	18.0	1999 2000
8	Ben Sorensen	16.5	2014 2015 2016 2017
9	Darren Arbet	16.0	1983 1984 1985
10	Josiah Erickson	15.0	2016 2017 2018 2019 2021

Single season
Rk	Player	Sacks	Year
1	George Obinna	14.0	2019
2	Zack Nash	13.0	2010
3	Anthony Daisley	12.0	1999
	Jason Sandel	12.0	1995
	Stuart Bailey	12.0	1986
6	Randy Rains	11.5	1986
	Kelly Osborn	11.5	1984
8	Zack Nash	10.5	2011
9	Josiah Erickson	10.0	2021
	Christian Clark	10.0	2009
	Jacob Houston	10.0	2004
	Dustin Smith	10.0	1998

== Kicking ==
=== Field goals made ===
Career
Rk	Player	FGs	Years
1	Scott Brown	44	1996 1997 1998 1999
2	Kyle Sentkowski	38	2019 2021 2022
3	Juan Gamboa	36	2005 2006 2007 2008
4	Devon Medeiros	34	2015 2016 2017 2018 2019
5	Zach Schreiner	33	2023 2024
6	Brad Cornish	26	2012 2013 2014 2015
	Tyson Becker	26	1992 1993 1994 1995
8	Chris Diniz	25	2009 2010
9	Jim Crouch	19	1990 1991
	Roy Arreygue	19	1973 1974 1975

Single season
Rk	Player	FGs	Year
1	Kyle Sentkowski	21	2021
2	Zach Schreiner	19	2024
3	Kyle Sentkowski	17	2022
4	Zach Schreiner	14	2023
	Devon Medeiros	14	2017
	Brad Cornish	14	2014
	Bret LeVier	14	2002
	Scott Brown	14	1999
9	Chris Diniz	13	2010
	Jim Crouch	13	1991

Single game
Rk	Player	FGs	Year	Opponent
1	Brad Cornish	5	2014	Weber State
2	Grant Meadors	4	2025	Northern Colo.
	Edgar Castaneda	4	2012	Idaho State
	Chris Diniz	4	2010	Montana
	Bret LeVier	4	2002	Weber State
	Jim Crouch	4	1991	Montana State
7	18 times	3	Most recent: Grant Meadors, 2026 vs. Kent State	

=== Field goal percentage ===
Career (1976-Present) (min. 10 att.)
Rk	Player	FG%	Years
1	Chris Diniz	89.3%	2009 2010
2	Kyle Sentkowski	82.6%	2019 2021 2022
3	Grant Meadors	80.0%	2025
4	Zach Schreiner	78.6%	2023 2024
	Edgar Castaneda	78.6%	2012
6	Bret LeVier	76.2%	2001 2002 2003
7	Dan Siroskey	70.0%	1976

Single season (1976-Present) (min. 5 att.)
Rk	Player	FG%	Year
1	Chris Diniz	92.3%	2009
2	Chris Diniz	86.7%	2010
3	Kyle Sentkowski	85.0%	2022
4	Kyle Sentkowski	84.0%	2021
5	Zach Schreiner	82.6%	2024
6	Devon Medeiros	82.4%	2017
	Brad Cornish	82.4%	2014
8	Jim Crouch	81.2%	1991
9	Grant Meadors	80.0%	2025
10	Edgar Castaneda	78.6%	2012
