= 2024 Sacramento State Hornets football team =

American college football season

2024 Sacramento State Hornets football
- Conference: Big Sky Conference
- Record: 3–9 (1–7 Big Sky)
- Head coach: Andy Thompson (2nd season)
- Offensive coordinator: Bobby Fresques (2nd season)
- Home stadium: Hornet Stadium

2024 Big Sky Conference football standings
	Conf.			Overall
Team	W		L	W		L
No. 2 Montana State $^	8	–	0	15	–	1
No. 5 UC Davis ^	7	–	1	11	–	3
No. 7 Idaho ^	6	–	2	10	–	4
No. 22 Northern Arizona ^	6	–	2	8	–	5
No. 10 Montana ^	5	–	3	9	–	5
Idaho State	3	–	5	5	–	7
Eastern Washington	3	–	5	4	–	8
Weber State	3	–	5	4	–	8
Portland State	3	–	5	3	–	8
Cal Poly	2	–	6	3	–	8
Sacramento State	1	–	7	3	–	9
Northern Colorado	1	–	7	1	–	11
$ – Conference champion; ^ – FCS playoff participant; Rankings from STATS Poll

The 2024 Sacramento State Hornets football team represented California State University, Sacramento during the 2024 NCAA Division I FCS football season as a member of the Big Sky Conference. They were led by second-year head coach Andy Thompson and played their home games at Hornet Stadium in Sacramento, California.

== Offseason ==
=== Transfer portal ===
Departing transfers
Name	Pos.	Height	Weight	Year	Hometown	New school	Ref
Connor Stutz	P	6'2	216		Seattle, WA	UConn	
Cameron Skattebo	RB	5'10	225		Rio Linda, CA	Arizona State	
Kameron Rocha	S	6'0	177		San Jacinto, CA	Southern Utah	

Incoming transfers
Name	Pos.	Height	Weight	Year	Hometown	Transfer from	Ref
Yebrell Emerson	S	6'2	195		Fresno, CA	Fresno City College	
Jay Rudolph	TE	6'5	295		Scottsdale, AZ	San Diego State	
Bryson Summers	OL	6'5	295		El Dorado Hills, CA	Coastal Carolina	
Malini Ti'a	DB	6'0	200		Livermore, CA	College of San Mateo	
Colby Warkentin	DL	6'6	265		Bakersfield, CA	Abilene Christian	
Makai Cope	WR	6'4	210		Culver City, CA	Utah	
Murvin Kenion III	S	6'0	205		Vallejo, CA	Idaho	
Will Leota	LB	6'0	217		Salem, UT	Utah Tech	
Gavin Nelson	TE	6'3	247		Clovis, CA	Fresno City College	

== Schedule ==
Date	Time	Opponent	Rank	Site	TV	Result	Attendance
August 29	7:00 p.m.	at San Jose State*	No. 8	CEFCU Stadium; San Jose, CA	TruTV	L 24–42	13,811
September 7	7:00 p.m.	at Fresno State*	No. 8	Valley Children's Stadium; Fresno, CA	KMAX/MW Network	L 30–46	41,031
September 14	6:00 p.m.	No. 24 Nicholls*	No. 11	Hornet Stadium; Sacramento, CA	KMAX/ESPN+	W 34–7	12,494
September 21	4:00 p.m.	at Texas A&M–Commerce (Note: On November 7, 2024, Texas A&M University–Commerce changed its name to East Texas A&M University.)*	No. 11	Ernest Hawkins Field at Memorial Stadium; Commerce, TX	ESPN+	W 34–0	4,477
September 28	1:00 p.m.	at Northern Arizona	No. 10	Walkup Skydome; Flagstaff, AZ	ESPN+	L 16–34	9,232
October 12	6:00 p.m.	Eastern Washington	No. 18	Hornet Stadium; Sacramento, CA	KMAX/ESPN+	L 28–35	14,916
October 19	6:00 p.m.	Weber State		Hornet Stadium; Sacramento, CA	KMAX/ESPN+	W 51–48 ^{2OT}	15,530
October 26	3:00 p.m.	at Idaho State		ICCU Dome; Pocatello, ID	ESPN+	L 27–30 ^{OT}	5,804
November 2	6:00 p.m.	Portland State		Hornet Stadium; Sacramento, CA	KMAX/ESPN+	L 38–58	11,055
November 9	12:00 p.m.	at No. 2 Montana State		Bobcat Stadium; Bozeman, MT	ESPN+	L 7–49	21,987
November 16	2:00 p.m.	at Cal Poly		Mustang Memorial Field; San Luis Obispo, CA	ESPN+	L 23–26	4,742
November 23	2:00 p.m.	No. 5 UC Davis		Hornet Stadium; Sacramento, CA (Causeway Classic)	KMAX/ESPN+	L 39–42	16,239
*Non-conference game; Rankings from STATS Poll released prior to the game; All times are in Pacific time; Source:

== Game summaries ==
=== at San Jose State (FBS) ===
Game One – No. 8 Sacramento State Hornets (0–0) vs San Jose State Spartans (FBS) (0–0) – Game summary

Quarter	1	2	3	4	Total
No. 8 Hornets	14	3	7	0	24
Spartans (FBS)	7	7	7	21	42

at CEFCU Stadium • San Jose, CA

- Date: Thursday August 29, 2024
- Game time: 7:00 PM PST
- Game attendance: 13,811
- Referee: Christian Watson
- TV announcers (TruTV): Ari Wolfe (play-by-play) and Darius Walker (analyst)

Game information

First quarter

- (7:18) SAC – Elijah Tau-Tolliver 3-yard run (Zach Schreiner kick) (Drive: 12 plays, 72 yards, 4:50; Sacramento State 7-0)
- (5:30) SAC – Elijah Tau-Tolliver 2-yard run (Zach Schreiner kick) (Drive: 4 plays, 15 yards, 1:31; Sacramento State 14-0)
- (3:09) SJSU – Nick Nash 24-yard pass from Emmett Brown (Kyler Halvorsen kick) (Drive: 6 plays, 68 yards, 2:16; Sacramento State 14-7)

Second quarter

- (9:28) SAC – Zach Schreiner 28-yard field goal (Drive: 9 plays, 35 yards, 3:25; Sacramento State 17-7)
- (1:49) SJSU – Jacob Stewart 26-yard pass from Nick Nash (Kyler Halvorsen kick) (Drive: 6 plays, 68 yards, 1:53; Sacramento State 17-14)

Third quarter

- (12:29) SJSU – Nick Nash 11-yard pass from Emmett Brown (Kyler Halvorsen kick) (Drive: 7 plays, 75 yards, 2:31; San Jose State 21-17)
- (2:24) SAC – Danny Scudero 20-yard pass from Carson Conklin (Zach Schreiner kick) (Drive: 11 plays, 80 yards, 4:43; Sacramento State 24-21)

Fourth quarter

- (12:13) SJSU – Floyd Chalk IV 4-yard run (Kyler Halvorsen kick) (Drive: 12 plays, 90 yards, 5:06; San Jose State 28-24)
- (10:09) SJSU – Justin Lockhart 8-yard pass from Emmett Brown (Kyler Halvorsen kick) (Drive: 4 plays, 18 yards, 1:57; San Jose State 35-24)
- (2:07) SJSU – Floyd Chalk IV 27-yard run (Kyler Halvorsen kick) (Drive: 1 play, 22 yards, 0:06; San Jose State 42-24)

Statistics	SAC	SJSU
First downs	23	25
Total yards	62–356	66–387
Rushing yards	41–177	31–63
Passing yards	179	324
Passing: Comp–Att–Int	21–41–2	21–35–1
Time of possession	33:41	26:35

Team	Category	Player	Statistics
Sacramento State	Passing	Kaiden Bennett	17/32, 134 yards, 2 INT
Sacramento State	Rushing	Elijah Tau-Tolliver	22 carries, 110 yards, 2 TD
Sacramento State	Receiving	Anderson Grover	5 receptions, 64 yards
San Jose State	Passing	Emmett Brown	20/34, 298 yards, 3 TD, INT
San Jose State	Rushing	Floyd Chalk IV	18 carries, 87 yards, 2 TD
San Jose State	Receiving	Nick Nash	10 receptions, 170 yards, 2 TD

=== at Fresno State (FBS) ===
Game Two – No. 8 Sacramento State Hornets (0–1) vs Fresno State Bulldogs (FBS) (0–1) – Game summary

Quarter	1	2	3	4	Total
No. 8 Hornets	0	0	0	0	0
Bulldogs (FBS)	18	7	14	7	46

at Valley Children's Stadium • Fresno, CA

- Date: Saturday September 7, 2024
- Game time: 7:00 PM PST
- Game weather: 89 °F (32 °C)
- Game attendance: 41,031
- Referee: Michael Cuttone
- TV announcers (KGPE): Scott Bemis (play-by-play) and Marcus McMaryion (analyst)

Game information

First quarter

- (14:50) FRES – Mac Dalena 75-yard pass from Mikey Keene, Jayden Mandel two-point run (Drive: 1 play, 75 yards, 0:10; Fresno State 8–0)
- (11:02) SAC – Zach Schreiner 34-yard field goal (Drive: 4 plays, 3 yards, 1:08; Fresno State 8–3)
- (8:12) FRES – Jalen Moss 85-yard punt return, Dylan Lynch kick (Fresno State 15–3)
- (7:13) FRES – Dylan Lynch 32-yard field goal (Drive: 4 plays, 6 yards, 0:53; Fresno State 18–3)

Second quarter

- (12:49) FRES – Malik Sherrod 2-yard run, Dylan Lynch kick (Drive: 8 plays, 80 yards, 2:57; Fresno State 25–3)
- (5:53) SAC – Jared Gipson 78-yard pass from Kaiden Bennett, Zach Schreiner kick (Drive: 2 plays, 80 yards, 0:43; Fresno State 25–10)

Third quarter

- (12:25) SAC – Ezra Moleni 13-yard pass from Carson Conklin, Zach Schreiner kick (Drive: 7 plays, 75 yards, 2:35; Fresno State 25–17)
- (3:32) FRES – Tyler Mello 1-yard pass from Mikey Keene, Dylan Lynch kick (Drive: 13 plays, 75 yards, 6:13; Fresno State 32–17)
- (1:05) FRES – Malik Sherrod 1-yard run, Dylan Lynch kick (Drive: 4 plays, 50 yards, 1:31; Fresno State 39–17)

Fourth quarter

- (11:43) SAC – Austin Jarrard 3-yard pass from Carson Conklin, two-point conversion failed (Drive: 13 plays, 75 yards, 4:22; Fresno State 39–23)
- (8:06) FRES – Joshua Wood 10-yard run, Dylan Lynch kick (Drive: 7 plays, 75 yards, 3:37; Fresno State 46–23)
- (6:51) SAC – Anderson Grover 36-yard pass from Carson Conklin, Zach Schreiner kick (Drive: 3 plays, 75 yards, 1:15; Fresno State 46–30)

Statistics	SAC	FRES
First downs	20	22
Total yards	469	513
Rushing yards	115	155
Passing yards	354	358
Passing: Comp–Att–Int	25–50–1	24–35–2
Time of possession	25:27	34:33

Team	Category	Player	Statistics
Sacramento State	Passing	Carson Conklin	20/37, 219 yards, 3 TD
Sacramento State	Rushing	Elijah Tau-Tolliver	14 carries, 74 yards
Sacramento State	Receiving	Jared Gipson	5 receptions, 138 yards, TD
Fresno State	Passing	Mikey Keene	23/34, 356 yards, 2 TD, 2 INT
Fresno State	Rushing	Malik Sherrod	22 carries, 54 yards, 2 TD
Fresno State	Receiving	Mac Dalena	7 receptions, 235 yards, TD

=== No. 24 Nicholls ===
Game Three – No. 24 Nicholls Colonels (0–2) vs No. 11 Sacramento State Hornets (0–2) – Game summary

Quarter	1	2	3	4	Total
No. 24 Colonels	0	0	0	0	0
No. 11 Hornets	0	0	0	0	0

at Hornet Stadium • Sacramento, CA

- Date: Saturday September 14, 2024
- Game time: 6:00 PM PST
- Game weather: 0 °F (−18 °C)
- TV announcers (ESPN+): Jason Ross (play-by-play) and Darren Arbet (analyst)

Game information

First quarter
Second quarter
Third quarter
Fourth quarter

Statistics	NICH	SAC
First downs		
Total yards		
Rushing yards		
Passing yards		
Passing: Comp–Att–Int		
Time of possession		

Team	Category	Player	Statistics
Nicholls	Passing		
Nicholls	Rushing		
Nicholls	Receiving		
Sacramento State	Passing		
Sacramento State	Rushing		
Sacramento State	Receiving		

=== at Texas A&M–Commerce ===
Game Four – No. 11 Sacramento State Hornets (1–2) vs Texas A&M–Commerce Lions (0–3) – Game summary

Quarter	1	2	3	4	Total
No. 11 Hornets	3	17	14	0	34
Lions	0	0	0	0	0

at Ernest Hawkins Field at Memorial Stadium • Commerce, TX

- Date: Saturday September 21, 2024
- Game time: 4:00 PM PST
- Game weather: Sunny, 93 °F (34 °C), S 8 mph
- Game attendance: 4,477
- Referee: Austin Mezzacasa
- TV announcers (ESPN+): Greg Higgins (play-by-play) and Adam Routon (analyst)

Game information

First quarter

- SAC – Zach Schreiner 37-yard field goal, 11:03. Hornets 3–0. Drive: 9 plays, 56 yards, 3:57.

Second quarter

- SAC – Zach Schreiner 34-yard field goal, 7:52. Hornets 6–0. Drive: 7 plays, 39 yards, 2:45.
- SAC – Elias Mullican 35-yard interception return (Zach Shreiner kick), 6:34. Hornets 13–0.
- SAC – Jared Gipson 22-yard pass from Carson Conklin (Zach Shreiner kick), 0:35. Hornets 20–0. Drive: 10 plays, 69 yards, 3:24.

Third quarter

- SAC – Elijah Tau-Tolliver 16-yard pass from Carson Conklin (Zach Schreiner kick), 10:46. Hornets 27–0. Drive: 5 plays, 27 yards, 2:21.
- SAC – Ezra Moleni 1-yard run (Zach Schreiner kick), 2:24. Hornets 34–0. Drive: 12 plays, 58 yards, 6:43.

Fourth quarter

No scoring plays

Statistics	SAC	TAMC
First downs	20	9
Total yards	414	197
Rushing yards	260	26
Passing yards	154	171
Passing: Comp–Att–Int	13–24–1	16–33–3
Time of possession	38:04	21:56

Team	Category	Player	Statistics
Sacramento State	Passing	Carson Conklin	13/22, 154 yards, 2 TD
Sacramento State	Rushing	Elijah Tau-Tolliver	20 rushes, 127 yards
Sacramento State	Receiving	Jared Gipson	4 receptions, 85 yards, TD
Texas A&M–Commerce	Passing	Eric Rodriguez	8/16, 87 yards, 2 INT
Texas A&M–Commerce	Rushing	B. K. Jackson	9 rushes, 32 yards
Texas A&M–Commerce	Receiving	Tyler Daniels	2 receptions, 51 yards

=== at Northern Arizona ===
Game Five – No. 10 Sacramento State Hornets (2–2) vs Northern Arizona Lumberjacks (2–2) – Game summary

Quarter	1	2	3	4	Total
No. 10 Hornets	0	0	0	0	0
Lumberjacks	0	0	0	0	0

at Walkup Skydome • Flagstaff, AZ

- Date: Saturday September 28, 2024
- Game time: 1:00 PM PST
- Game weather: 0 °F (−18 °C)
- TV announcers (ESPN+): Mitch Strohman (play-by-play), Kevin Stephens (analyst) and Ava Nichols (sideline)

Game information

First quarter
Second quarter
Third quarter
Fourth quarter

Statistics	SAC	NAU
First downs		
Total yards		
Rushing yards		
Passing yards		
Passing: Comp–Att–Int		
Time of possession		

Team	Category	Player	Statistics
Sacramento State	Passing		
Sacramento State	Rushing		
Sacramento State	Receiving		
Northern Arizona	Passing		
Northern Arizona	Rushing		
Northern Arizona	Receiving		

=== Eastern Washington ===
Game Six – Eastern Washington Eagles (1–4) vs No. 18 Sacramento State Hornets (2–3) – Game summary

Quarter	1	2	3	4	Total
Eagles	7	7	14	7	35
No. 18 Hornets	7	14	0	7	28

at Hornet Stadium • Sacramento, CA

- Date: Saturday October 12, 2024
- Game time: 6:00 PM PST
- Game weather: 0 °F (−18 °C)
- TV announcers (ESPN+): Jason Ross Jr. (play-by-play) and Darren Arbet (analyst)

Game information

First quarter
Second quarter
Third quarter
Fourth quarter

Statistics	EWU	SAC
First downs	28	22
Total yards	441	365
Rushing yards	286	127
Passing yards	155	238
Passing: Comp–Att–Int	16-18-0	21–35–1
Time of possession	32:59	27:01

Team	Category	Player	Statistics
Eastern Washington	Passing	Kekoa Visperas	15-17 141 yards 1 TD
Eastern Washington	Rushing	Tuna Altahir	16 Carries 102 Yards 1 TD
Eastern Washington	Receiving	Efton Chism III	7 Receptions 67 Yards
Sacramento State	Passing	Carson Conklin	21-35 238 yards 4 TD 1 INT
Sacramento State	Rushing	Elijah Tau-Tolliver	18 Carries 94 Yards
Sacramento State	Receiving	Jared Gipson	4 Receptions 68 Yards 1 TD

=== Weber State ===
Game Seven – Weber State Wildcats (3–4) vs Sacramento State Hornets (2–4) – Game summary

Quarter	1	2	3	4	Total
Wildcats	0	0	0	0	0
Hornets	0	0	0	0	0

at Hornet Stadium • Sacramento, CA

- Date: Saturday October 19, 2024
- Game time: 6:00 PM PST
- Game weather: 0 °F (−18 °C)
- TV announcers (ESPN+): Jason Ross (play-by-play) and Darren Arbet (analyst)

Game information

First quarter
Second quarter
Third quarter
Fourth quarter

Statistics	WEB	SAC
First downs		
Total yards		
Rushing yards		
Passing yards		
Passing: Comp–Att–Int		
Time of possession		

Team	Category	Player	Statistics
Weber State	Passing		
Weber State	Rushing		
Weber State	Receiving		
Sacramento State	Passing		
Sacramento State	Rushing		
Sacramento State	Receiving		

=== at Idaho State ===
Game Eight – Sacramento State Hornets (3–4) vs Idaho State Bengals (3–5) – Game summary

Quarter	1	2	3	4	OT	Total
Hornets	7	14	0	3	3	27
Bengals	0	21	3	0	6	30

at ICCU Dome • Pocatello, ID

- Date: Saturday October 26, 2024
- Game time: 3:00 PM PST
- Game weather: None (Indoor stadium)
- Game attendance: 5,804
- Referee: Scott Root
- TV announcers (ESPN+): Scott Gross (play-by-play), Kody Graves (analyst) and Mitch Beckstead (sideline)

Game information

First quarter
Second quarter
Third quarter
Fourth quarter

Statistics	SAC	IDST
First downs		
Total yards		
Rushing yards		
Passing yards		
Passing: Comp–Att–Int		
Time of possession		

Team	Category	Player	Statistics
Sacramento State	Passing		
Sacramento State	Rushing		
Sacramento State	Receiving		
Idaho State	Passing		
Idaho State	Rushing		
Idaho State	Receiving		

=== Portland State ===
Game Nine – Portland State Vikings (1–6) vs Sacramento State Hornets (3–5) – Game summary

Quarter	1	2	3	4	Total
Vikings	0	0	0	0	0
Hornets	0	0	0	0	0

at Hornet Stadium • Sacramento, CA

- Date: Saturday November 2, 2024
- Game time: 6:00 PM PST
- Game weather: 0 °F (−18 °C)
- TV announcers (ESPN+): Jason Ross (play-by-play) and Darren Arbet (analyst)

Game information

First quarter
Second quarter
Third quarter
Fourth quarter

Statistics	PRST	SAC
First downs		
Total yards		
Rushing yards		
Passing yards		
Passing: Comp–Att–Int		
Time of possession		

Team	Category	Player	Statistics
Portland State	Passing		
Portland State	Rushing		
Portland State	Receiving		
Sacramento State	Passing		
Sacramento State	Rushing		
Sacramento State	Receiving		

=== at No. 2 Montana State ===
Game Ten – Sacramento State Hornets (3–6) vs No. 2 Montana State Bobcats (9–0) – Game summary

Quarter	1	2	3	4	Total
Hornets	0	0	7	0	7
No. 2 Bobcats	14	14	14	7	49

at Bobcat Stadium • Bozeman, MT

- Date: Saturday November 9, 2024
- Game time: 12:00 PM PST
- Game weather: Cloudy • Temperature: 47 °F (8 °C) • Wind: W 2 mph
- Game attendance: 21,987
- Referee: Michael Bezner
- TV announcers (ESPN+): Ben Creighton (play-by-play), Ty Gregorak (analyst) and Grace Lawrence (sideline)

Game information

First quarter

- (11:04) MTST - Ty McCullouch 64-yard run (Myles Sansted kick) (Montana State 7-0)
- (5:41) MTST - Tommy Mellott 14-yard run (Myles Sansted kick) (Montana State 14-0)

Second quarter

- (10:14) MTST - Julius Davis 5-yard run (Myles Sansted kick) (Montana State 21-0)
- (3:08) MTST - Tommy Mellott 13-yard run (Myles Sansted kick) (Montana State 28-0)

Third quarter

- (13:30) MTST - Scottre Humphrey 3-yard run (Myles Sansted kick) (Montana State 35-0)
- (9:56) MTST - Adam Jones 57-yard run (Myles Sansted kick) (Montana State 42-0)
- (8:39) SAC - Curron Borders 43-yard run (Zach Schreiner kick) (Montana State 42-7)

Fourth quarter

- (13:26) MTST - Julius Davis 1-yard run (Myles Sansted kick) (Montana State 49-7)

Statistics	SAC	MTST
First downs	15	24
Total yards	255	604
Rushing yards	119	508
Passing yards	136	96
Passing: Comp–Att–Int	13–30–1	8–13–0
Time of possession	26:35	33:25

Team	Category	Player	Statistics
Sacramento State	Passing	Carson Conklin	12/27, 138 yards, INT
Sacramento State	Rushing	Curron Borders	5 carries, 57 yards, TD
Sacramento State	Receiving	Danny Scudero	7 receptions, 70 yards
Montana State	Passing	Tommy Mellott	7/10, 89 yards
Montana State	Rushing	Adam Jones	5 carries, 159 yards, TD
Montana State	Receiving	Ty McCullouch	1 reception, 32 yards

=== at Cal Poly ===
Game Eleven – Sacramento State Hornets (3–7) vs Cal Poly Mustangs (2–7) – Game summary

Quarter	1	2	3	4	Total
Hornets	0	0	0	0	0
Mustangs	0	0	0	0	0

at Mustang Memorial Field • San Luis Obispo, CA

- Date: Saturday November 16, 2024
- Game time: 2:00 PM PST
- Game weather: 0 °F (−18 °C)
- Game attendance: 4,742
- TV announcers (ESPN+): Chris Sylvester (play-by-play) and John Kane (analyst)

Game information

First quarter
Second quarter
Third quarter
Fourth quarter

Statistics	SAC	CP
First downs		
Total yards		
Rushing yards		
Passing yards		
Passing: Comp–Att–Int		
Time of possession		

Team	Category	Player	Statistics
Sacramento State	Passing		
Sacramento State	Rushing		
Sacramento State	Receiving		
Cal Poly	Passing		
Cal Poly	Rushing		
Cal Poly	Receiving		

=== No. 5 UC Davis (Causeway Classic) ===
Game Twelve – No. 5 UC Davis Aggies (9–2) vs Sacramento State Hornets (3–8) – Game summary

Quarter	1	2	3	4	Total
No. 5 Aggies	0	0	0	0	0
Hornets	0	0	0	0	0

at Hornet Stadium • Sacramento, CA

- Date: Saturday November 23, 2024
- Game time: 2:00 PM PST
- Game weather: 0 °F (−18 °C)
- TV announcers (ESPN+): Jason Ross (play-by-play) and Darren Arbet (analyst)

Game information

First quarter
Second quarter
Third quarter
Fourth quarter

Statistics	UCD	SAC
First downs		
Total yards		
Rushing yards		
Passing yards		
Passing: Comp–Att–Int		
Time of possession		

Team	Category	Player	Statistics
UC Davis	Passing		
UC Davis	Rushing		
UC Davis	Receiving		
Sacramento State	Passing		
Sacramento State	Rushing		
Sacramento State	Receiving		
