= 2023 Sacramento State Hornets football team =

American college football season

2023 Sacramento State Hornets football

NCAA Division I Second Round, L 24–34 vs. South Dakota
- Conference: Big Sky Conference

Ranking
- STATS: No. 13
- FCS Coaches: No. 15
- Record: 8–5 (4–4 Big Sky)
- Head coach: Andy Thompson (1st season)
- Offensive coordinator: Bobby Fresques (1st season)
- Offensive scheme: West Coast
- Base defense: 4–2–5
- Home stadium: Hornet Stadium

2023 Big Sky Conference football standings
| | Conf. | | | Overall |
| Team | W | | L | W | | L |
|---|---|---|---|---|---|---|
| No. 2 Montana $^ | 7 | – | 1 | 13 | – | 2 |
| No. 8 Idaho ^ | 6 | – | 2 | 9 | – | 4 |
| No. 9 Montana State ^ | 6 | – | 2 | 8 | – | 4 |
| Northern Arizona | 5 | – | 3 | 5 | – | 6 |
| No. 24 UC Davis | 5 | – | 3 | 7 | – | 4 |
| No. 13 Sacramento State ^ | 4 | – | 4 | 8 | – | 5 |
| Portland State | 4 | – | 4 | 5 | – | 6 |
| Weber State | 4 | – | 4 | 6 | – | 5 |
| Eastern Washington | 3 | – | 5 | 4 | – | 7 |
| Idaho State | 3 | – | 5 | 3 | – | 8 |
| Cal Poly | 1 | – | 7 | 3 | – | 8 |
| Northern Colorado | 0 | – | 8 | 0 | – | 11 |
$ – Conference champion; ^ – FCS playoff participant; Rankings from STATS Poll

The 2023 Sacramento State Hornets football team represented California State University, Sacramento as a member of the Big Sky Conference during the 2023 NCAA Division I FCS football season. Led by first-year head coach Andy Thompson, the Hornets played home games at Hornet Stadium in Sacramento, California.

Previously the Hornets' defensive coordinator for four seasons under Troy Taylor, Thompson was promoted in December 2022 after Taylor left for Stanford University.

== Preseason ==
=== Polls ===
On July 23, 2023, during the virtual Big Sky Kickoff, the Hornets were predicted to finish third in the Big Sky by the coaches and fourth by the media.

== Schedule ==
| Date | Time | Opponent | Rank | Site | TV | Result | Attendance |
|---|---|---|---|---|---|---|---|
| August 31 | 4:00 p.m. | at Nicholls* | No. 10 | John L. Guidry Stadium; Thibodaux, LA | ESPN+ | W 38–24 | 5,134 |
| September 9 | 7:00 p.m. | Texas A&M–Commerce* | No. 9 | Hornet Stadium; Sacramento, CA | KMAX-TV/ESPN+ | W 34–6 | 12,316 |
| September 16 | 5:00 p.m. | at Stanford* | No. 8 | Stanford Stadium; Stanford, CA | P12N | W 30–23 | 23,848 |
| September 23 | 1:00 p.m. | at No. 7 Idaho | No. 4 | Kibbie Dome; Moscow, ID | KMAX-TV/ESPN+ | L 27–36 | 9,433 |
| September 30 | 6:00 p.m. | Northern Arizona | No. 8 | Hornet Stadium; Sacramento, CA | KMAX-TV/ESPN+ | W 31–30 | 12,549 |
| October 14 | 12:00 p.m. | at Northern Colorado | No. 4 | Nottingham Field; Greeley, CO | ESPN+ | W 21–13 | 4,783 |
| October 21 | 7:30 p.m. | No. 2 Montana State | No. 3 | Hornet Stadium; Sacramento, CA | ESPN2 | L 30–42 | 16,122 |
| October 28 | 6:00 p.m. | Idaho State^{†} | No. 6 | Hornet Stadium; Sacramento, CA | KMAX-TV/ESPN+ | W 51–16 | 13,733 |
| November 4 | 5:00 p.m. | at No. 4 Montana | No. 7 | Washington–Grizzly Stadium; Missoula, MT | KMAX-TV/ESPN+ | L 7–34 | 25,888 |
| November 11 | 2:00 p.m. | Cal Poly | No. 9 | Hornet Stadium; Sacramento, CA | KMAX-TV/ESPN+ | W 41–30 | 12,022 |
| November 18 | 12:00 p.m. | at UC Davis | No. 8 | UC Davis Health Stadium; Davis, CA (Causeway Classic) | ESPN+ | L 21–31 | 11,622 |
| November 25 | 10:00 a.m. | at No. 12 North Dakota* | No. 15 | Alerus Center; Grand Forks, ND (NCAA Division I First Round) | ESPN+ | W 42–35 | 6,522 |
| December 2 | 11:00 a.m. | at No. 3 South Dakota* | No. 15 | DakotaDome; Vermillion, SD (NCAA Division I Second Round) | ESPN+ | L 24–34 | 6,288 |
*Non-conference game; ^{†}Homecoming; Rankings from STATS Poll released prior to the game; All times are in Pacific time

== Game summaries ==
=== at Nicholls ===
No. 10 Sacramento State Hornets (0–0) at Nicholls Colonels (0–0) – Game summary

| Quarter | 1 | 2 | 3 | 4 | Total |
|---|---|---|---|---|---|
| No. 10 Hornets | 7 | 10 | 7 | 14 | 38 |
| Colonels | 0 | 3 | 7 | 14 | 24 |

at Manning Field at John L. Guidry Stadium, Thibodaux, LA

- Date: August 31, 2023
- Game time: 4:00 p.m. PST
- Game weather: Sunny
- Game attendance: 5,134
- Referee: James Brookhard
- TV announcers (ESPN+): Play-by-Play: Jack Benjamin • Analysis: Wayde Keiser

Game information

First Quarter

- (10:01) SAC – Marcus Fulcher 5-yard run (Zach Schreiner kick) (Drive: 14 plays, 75 yards, 4:59; Sacramento State 7–0)

Second Quarter

- (13:16) SAC – Marcus Fulcher 1-yard run (Zach Schreiner kick) (Drive: 5 plays, 33 yards, 2:04; Sacramento State 14–0)
- (6:34) SAC – Zach Schreiner 23-yard field goal (Drive: 7 plays, 24 yards, 2:46; Sacramento State 17–0)
- (0:21) NICH – Gavin Lasseigne 30-yard field goal (Drive: 12 plays, 74 yards, 3:07; Sacramento State 17–3)

Third Quarter

- (7:16) NICH – Pat McQuaide 4-yard run (Gavin Lasseigne kick) (Drive: 3 plays, 12 yards, 1:12; Sacramento State 17–10)
- (1:05) SAC – Jared Gipson 40-yard pass from Kaiden Bennett (Zach Schreiner kick) (Drive: 5 plays, 89 yards, 1:58; Sacramento State 24–10)

Fourth Quarter

- (12:43) SAC – Kaiden Bennett 7-yard run (Zach Schreiner kick) (Drive: 5 plays, 63 yards, 2:06; Sacramento State 31–10)
- (10:13) SAC – Anderson Grover 6-yard pass from Kaiden Bennett (Zach Schreiner kick) (Drive: 1 play, 6 yards, 0:06; Sacramento State 38–10)
- (7:26) NICH – Jaylon Spears 3-yard run (Gavin Lasseigne kick) (Drive: 8 plays, 63 yards, 2:06; Sacramento State 38–17)
- (1:40) NICH – Terry Matthews 84-yard pass from Pat McQuaide (Gavin Lasseigne kick) (Drive: 3 plays, 96 yards, 1:08; Sacramento State 38–24)

Line

- SAC –23.5

Over/Under

- 54.5

| Statistics | SAC | NICH |
|---|---|---|
| First downs | 22 | 18 |
| Total yards | 441 | 293 |
| Rushing yards | 185 | 97 |
| Passing yards | 256 | 196 |
| Passing: Comp–Att–Int | 16–27–1 | 15–29–1 |
| Time of possession | 33:11 | 26:49 |

| Team | Category | Player | Statistics |
|---|---|---|---|
| Sacramento State | Passing | Kaiden Bennett | 11/16, 221 yards, 2 TD |
| Sacramento State | Rushing | Marcus Fulcher | 19 carries, 71 yards, 2 TD |
| Sacramento State | Receiving | Devin Gandy | 3 receptions, 82 yards |
| Nicholls | Passing | Pat McQuaide | 15/29, 196 yards, TD, INT |
| Nicholls | Rushing | Collin Guggenheim | 16 carries, 74 yards |
| Nicholls | Receiving | Terry Matthews | 1 reception, 84 yards |

=== Texas A&M–Commerce ===
Texas A&M–Commerce Lions (0–1) at No. 9 Sacramento State Hornets (1–0) – Game summary

| Quarter | 1 | 2 | 3 | 4 | Total |
|---|---|---|---|---|---|
| Lions | 0 | 6 | 0 | 0 | 6 |
| No. 9 Hornets | 10 | 17 | 7 | 0 | 34 |

at Hornet Stadium, Sacramento, CA

- Date: September 9, 2023
- Game time: 7:00 p.m. PST
- Game weather: 85 °F (29 °C) • NE 7 mph • Sunny
- Game attendance: 12,316
- Referee: Scott Root
- TV announcers (KMAX-TV/ESPN+): Play-by-Play: Jason Ross, Jr. • Analysis: Darren Arbet

Game information

First Quarter

- (10:01) SAC – Kaiden Bennett 8-yard run (Zach Schreiner kick) (Drive: 7 plays, 80 yards, 2:45; Sacramento State 7–0)
- (4:13) SAC – Zach Schreiner 33-yard field goal (Drive: 10 plays, 42 yards, 3:50; Sacramento State 10–0)

Second Quarter

- (11:16) SAC – Chris Miller 16-yard pass from Kaiden Bennett (Zach Schreiner kick) (Drive: 13 plays, 85 yards, 5:51; Sacramento State 17–0)
- (7:17) SAC – Kaiden Bennett 40-yard run (Zach Schreiner kick) (Drive: 5 plays, 83 yards, 1:53; Sacramento State 24–0)
- (0:41) TAMC – Peter Parrish 1-yard run (Drive: 3 plays, 14 yards, 0:25; Sacramento State 24–6)
- (0:00) SAC – Zach Schreiner 40-yard field goal (Drive: 4 plays, 48 yards, 0:36; Sacramento State 27–6)

Third Quarter

- (8:47) SAC – Marcus Fulcher 5-yard run (Zach Schreiner kick) (Drive: 9 plays, 55 yards, 3:59; Sacramento State 34–6)

Line

- SAC –34.5

Over/Under

- 56.5

| Statistics | TAMC | SAC |
|---|---|---|
| First downs | 13 | 28 |
| Total yards | 216 | 503 |
| Rushing yards | 144 | 311 |
| Passing yards | 72 | 192 |
| Passing: Comp–Att–Int | 13–27–1 | 17–26–1 |
| Time of possession | 29:08 | 30:52 |

| Team | Category | Player | Statistics |
|---|---|---|---|
| Texas A&M–Commerce | Passing | Peter Parrish | 12/25, 63 yards, INT |
| Texas A&M–Commerce | Rushing | Reggie Branch | 14 carries, 65 yards |
| Texas A&M–Commerce | Receiving | Micaelous Elder | 6 receptions, 33 yards |
| Sacramento State | Passing | Kaiden Bennett | 14/22, 176 yards, TD, INT |
| Sacramento State | Rushing | Kaiden Bennett | 10 carries, 101 yards, 2 TD |
| Sacramento State | Receiving | Coleman Kuntz | 4 receptions, 68 yards |

=== at Stanford ===
No. 8 Sacramento State Hornets (2–0) at Stanford Cardinal (1–1) – Game summary

| Quarter | 1 | 2 | 3 | 4 | Total |
|---|---|---|---|---|---|
| No. 8 Hornets | 3 | 14 | 3 | 10 | 30 |
| Cardinal | 7 | 7 | 3 | 6 | 23 |

at Stanford Stadium, Stanford, CA

- Date: September 16, 2023
- Game time: 5:00 p.m. PST
- Game weather: 72 °F (22 °C) • W 15 mph • Sunny
- Game attendance: 23,848
- Referee: Justin Elliott
- TV announcers (P12N): Play-by-Play: Elise Woodward • Analysis: Greg Camarillo

Game information

First Quarter

- (6:34) STAN – Casey Filkins 1-yard run (Joshua Karty kick) (Drive: 13 plays, 79 yards, 6:30; Stanford 7–0)
- (0:44) SAC – Zach Schreiner 24-yard field goal (Drive: 13 plays, 69 yards, 5:50; Stanford 7–3)

Second Quarter

- (13:07) STAN – Elic Ayomanor 51-yard pass from Ashton Daniels (Joshua Karty kick) (Drive: 7 plays, 74 yards, 2:31; Stanford 14–3)
- (6:01) SAC – Elijah Tau-Tolliver 1-yard run (Zach Schreiner kick) (Drive: 11 plays, 80 yards, 4:33; Stanford 14–10)
- (0:35) SAC – Kaiden Bennett 2-yard run (Zach Schreiner kick) (Drive: 13 plays, 77 yards, 4:21; Sacramento State 17–14)

Third Quarter

- (10:35) STAN – Joshua Karty 41-yard field goal (Drive: 8 plays, 56 yards, 4:19; Tied 17–17)
- (2:25) SAC – Zach Schreiner 22-yard field goal (Drive: 7 plays, 17 yards, 2:31; Sacramento State 20–17)

Fourth Quarter

- (13:30) STAN – Joshua Karty 40-yard field goal (Drive: 7 plays, 53 yards, 3:55; Tied 20–20)
- (8:53) STAN – Joshua Karty 39-yard field goal (Drive: 7 plays, 14 yards, 2:51; Stanford 23–20)
- (4:13) SAC – Zach Schreiner 44-yard field goal (Drive: 9 plays, 49 yards, 4:40; Tied 23–23)
- (1:32) SAC – Marcus Fulcher 49-yard pass from Kaiden Bennett (Zach Schreiner kick) (Drive: 3 plays, 53 yards, 0:51; Sacramento State 30–23)

Line

- STAN –7.5

Over/Under

- 60.5

| Statistics | SAC | STAN |
|---|---|---|
| First downs | 23 | 18 |
| Total yards | 448 | 387 |
| Rushing yards | 169 | 180 |
| Passing yards | 279 | 207 |
| Passing: Comp–Att–Int | 21–33–2 | 11–24–2 |
| Time of possession | 30:57 | 29:03 |

| Team | Category | Player | Statistics |
|---|---|---|---|
| Sacramento State | Passing | Kaiden Bennett | 21/33, 279 yards, TD, 2 INT |
| Sacramento State | Rushing | Kaiden Bennett | 13 carries, 100 yards, TD |
| Sacramento State | Receiving | Devin Gandy | 5 receptions, 64 yards |
| Stanford | Passing | Justin Lamson | 7/17, 138 yards, INT |
| Stanford | Rushing | E. J. Smith | 9 carries, 71 yards |
| Stanford | Receiving | Elic Ayomanor | 4 receptions, 89 yards, TD |

=== at No. 7 Idaho ===
No. 4 Sacramento State Hornets (3–0) at No. 7 Idaho Vandals (2–1) – Game summary

| Quarter | 1 | 2 | 3 | 4 | Total |
|---|---|---|---|---|---|
| No. 4 Hornets | 3 | 7 | 7 | 10 | 27 |
| No. 7 Vandals | 3 | 10 | 14 | 9 | 36 |

at Kibbie Dome, Moscow, ID

- Date: September 23, 2023
- Game time: 1:00 p.m. PST
- Game weather: Sunny, Indoors
- Game attendance: 9,433
- Referee: Jake Iverson
- TV announcers (KMAX-TV/ESPN+): Play-by-Play: Dennis Patchin • Analysis: Ryan Phillips

Game information

First Quarter

- (7:02) IDHO – Ricardo Chavez 29-yard field goal (Drive: 14 plays, 49 yards, 7:58; Idaho 3–0)
- (2:19) SAC – Zach Schreiner 36-yard field goal (Drive: 13 plays, 56 yards, 4:39; Tied 3–3)

Second Quarter

- (7:19) IDHO – Anthony Woods 2-yard run (Ricardo Chavez kick) (Drive: 12 plays, 68 yards, 7:03; Idaho 10–3)
- (1:26) IDHO – Ricardo Chavez 50-yard field goal (Drive: 8 plays, 32 yards, 4:08; Idaho 13–3)
- (0:31) SAC – Austin Jarrard 5-yard pass from Kaiden Bennett (Zach Schreiner kick) (Drive: 7 plays, 75 yards, 0:55; Idaho 13–10)

Third Quarter

- (10:39) IDHO – Turon Ivy Jr. 52-yard pass from Gevani McCoy (Ricardo Chavez kick) (Drive: 6 plays, 82 yards, 3:00; Idaho 20–10)
- (7:35) SAC – Marcus Fulcher 2-yard run (Zach Schreiner kick) (Drive: 8 plays, 75 yards, 3:04; Idaho 20–17)
- (0:18) IDHO – Terez Traynor 60-yard pass from Gevani McCoy (Ricardo Chavez kick) (Drive: 5 plays, 91 yards, 3:04; Idaho 27–17)

Fourth Quarter

- (11:00) SAC – Zach Schreiner 44-yard field goal (Drive: 13 plays, 54 yards, 4:12; Idaho 27–20)
- (4:54) SAC – Marcus Fulcher 11-yard pass from Kaiden Bennett (Zach Schreiner kick) (Drive: 6 plays, 54 yards, 2:13; Tied 27–27)
- (0:01) IDHO – Ricardo Chavez 30-yard field goal (Drive: 8 plays, 36 yards, 4:46; Idaho 30–27)
- (0:00) IDHO – Turon Ivy Jr. 6-yard fumble return (Idaho 36–27)

Line

- IDHO –2.5

Over/Under

- 57.5

| Statistics | SAC | IDHO |
|---|---|---|
| First downs | 18 | 21 |
| Total yards | 305 | 412 |
| Rushing yards | 69 | 178 |
| Passing yards | 236 | 234 |
| Passing: Comp–Att–Int | 15–29–0 | 15–21–0 |
| Time of possession | 21:21 | 38:39 |

| Team | Category | Player | Statistics |
|---|---|---|---|
| Sacramento State | Passing | Kaiden Bennett | 15/29, 236 yards, 2 TD |
| Sacramento State | Rushing | Marcus Fulcher | 10 carries, 44 yards, TD |
| Sacramento State | Receiving | Jared Gipson | 3 receptions, 91 yards |
| Idaho | Passing | Gevani McCoy | 15/21, 234 yards, 2 TD |
| Idaho | Rushing | Anthony Woods | 24 carries, 117 yards, TD |
| Idaho | Receiving | Hayden Hatten | 7 receptions, 72 yards |

=== Northern Arizona ===
Northern Arizona Lumberjacks (1–3) at No. 8 Sacramento State Hornets (3–1) – Game summary

| Quarter | 1 | 2 | 3 | 4 | Total |
|---|---|---|---|---|---|
| Lumberjacks | 7 | 14 | 7 | 2 | 30 |
| No. 8 Hornets | 14 | 10 | 0 | 7 | 31 |

at Hornet Stadium, Sacramento, CA

- Date: September 30, 2023
- Game time: 6:00 p.m. PST
- Game weather: 67 °F (19 °C) • 0 mph • Cloudy
- Game attendance: 12,549
- Referee: Gregg Wilson
- TV announcers (KMAX-TV/ESPN+): Play-by-Play: Jason Ross, Jr. • Analysis: Darren Arbet

Game information

First Quarter

- (11:54) NAU – Chase Belcher 3-yard run (Marcus Lye kick) (Drive: 4 plays, 81 yards, 1:37; Northern Arizona 7–0)
- (8:36) SAC – Carlos Hill 16-yard pass from Kaiden Bennett (Zach Schreiner kick) (Drive: 9 plays, 75 yards, 3:18; Tied 7–7)
- (1:32) SAC – Elijah Tau-Tolliver 3-yard run (Zach Schreiner kick) (Drive: 12 plays, 58 yards, 4:58; Sacramento State 14–7)

Second Quarter

- (14:29) NAU – Devon Starling 8-yard run (Marcus Lye kick failed) (Drive: 6 plays, 81 yards, 1:58; Sacramento State 14–13)
- (8:08) NAU – Coleman Owen 19-yard pass from Adam Damante (Adam Damante pass to Devon Starling for two-point conversion) (Drive: 8 plays, 98 yards, 4:05; Northern Arizona 21–14)
- (5:25) SAC – Zeke Burnett 7-yard run (Zach Schreiner kick) (Drive: 7 plays, 72 yards, 2:38; Tied 21–21)
- (1:22) SAC – Zach Schreiner 31-yard field goal (Drive: 9 plays, 32 yards, 3:09; Sacramento State 24–21)

Third Quarter

- (7:55) NAU – Devon Starling 8-yard run (Szymon Gawlick kick) (Drive: 16 plays, 99 yards, 6:54; Northern Arizona 28–24)

Fourth Quarter

- (8:31) SAC – Coleman Kuntz 2-yard run (Zach Schreiner kick) (Drive: 18 plays, 81 yards, 6:54; Sacramento State 31–28)
- (0:02) NAU – Team Safety (Drive: 4 plays, -13 yards, 1:34; Sacramento State 31–30)

Line

- SAC –20.0

Over/Under

- 59.5

| Statistics | NAU | SAC |
|---|---|---|
| First downs | 21 | 25 |
| Total yards | 450 | 418 |
| Rushing yards | 195 | 161 |
| Passing yards | 255 | 257 |
| Passing: Comp–Att–Int | 24–34–1 | 18–27–0 |
| Time of possession | 30:13 | 29:47 |

| Team | Category | Player | Statistics |
|---|---|---|---|
| Northern Arizona | Passing | Adam Damante | 23/33, 196 yards, TD, INT |
| Northern Arizona | Rushing | Devon Starling | 21 carries, 117 yards, 2 TD |
| Northern Arizona | Receiving | Elijah Taylor | 2 receptions, 73 yards |
| Sacramento State | Passing | Kaiden Bennett | 18/27, 257 yards, TD |
| Sacramento State | Rushing | Kaiden Bennett | 22 carries, 76 yards |
| Sacramento State | Receiving | Jared Gipson | 5 receptions, 108 yards |

=== at Northern Colorado ===
No. 4 Sacramento State Hornets (4–1) at Northern Colorado Bears (0–5) – Game summary

| Quarter | 1 | 2 | 3 | 4 | Total |
|---|---|---|---|---|---|
| No. 4 Hornets | 14 | 0 | 7 | 0 | 21 |
| Bears | 3 | 7 | 0 | 3 | 13 |

at Nottingham Field, Greeley, CO

- Date: October 14, 2023
- Game time: 12:00 p.m. PST
- Game weather: Sunny
- Game attendance: 4,783
- Referee: Jim Crowley
- TV announcers (ESPN+): Play-by-Play: Jason Alvine • Analysis: Mik Hager

Game information

First Quarter

- (12:19) UNC – Hunter Green 39-yard field goal (Drive: 4 plays, 1 yard, 0:50; Northern Colorado 3–0)
- (8:44) SAC – Devin Gandy 15-yard pass from Kaiden Bennett (Zach Schreiner kick) (Drive: 9 plays, 75 yards, 3:35; Sacramento State 7–3)
- (0:34) SAC – Ezra Moleni 8-yard pass from Kaiden Bennett (Zach Schreiner kick) (Drive: 9 plays, 53 yards, 3:56; Sacramento State 14–3)

Second Quarter

- (7:47) UNC – Brayden Munroe 41-yard pass from Jacob Sirmon (Hunter Green kick) (Drive: 5 plays, 92 yards, 2:29; Sacramento State 14–10)

Third Quarter

- (0:00) SAC – Carlos Hill 20-yard pass from Kaiden Bennett (Zach Schreiner kick) (Drive: 11 plays, 70 yards, 4:41; Sacramento State 21–10)

Fourth Quarter

- (8:31) UNC – Hunter Green 19-yard field goal (Drive: 14 plays, 73 yards, 3:50; Sacramento State 21–13)

Line

- SAC –25.0

Over/Under

- 58.5

| Statistics | SAC | UNC |
|---|---|---|
| First downs | 23 | 17 |
| Total yards | 334 | 332 |
| Rushing yards | 151 | 75 |
| Passing yards | 183 | 257 |
| Passing: Comp–Att–Int | 25–31–0 | 20–39–0 |
| Time of possession | 30:57 | 29:03 |

| Team | Category | Player | Statistics |
|---|---|---|---|
| Sacramento State | Passing | Kaiden Bennett | 25/31, 183 yards, 3 TD |
| Sacramento State | Rushing | Ezra Moleni | 16 carries, 93 yards |
| Sacramento State | Receiving | Marshel Martin | 7 receptions, 52 yards |
| Northern Colorado | Passing | Jacob Sirmon | 20/39, 257 yards, TD |
| Northern Colorado | Rushing | David Afari | 10 carries, 36 yards |
| Northern Colorado | Receiving | Brayden Munroe | 3 receptions, 66 yards, TD |

=== No. 2 Montana State ===
No. 2 Montana State Bobcats (5–1) at No. 3 Sacramento State Hornets (5–1) – Game summary

| Quarter | 1 | 2 | 3 | 4 | Total |
|---|---|---|---|---|---|
| No. 2 Bobcats | 0 | 14 | 7 | 21 | 42 |
| No. 3 Hornets | 7 | 0 | 10 | 13 | 30 |

at Hornet Stadium, Sacramento, CA

- Date: October 21, 2023
- Game time: 7:30 p.m. PST
- Game weather: SW 9 mph • Sunny
- Game attendance: 16,122
- Referee: Jim Crowley
- TV announcers (ESPN2): Play-by-Play: John Schriffen • Analysis: Rocky Boiman • Sideline: Dawn Davenport

Game information

First Quarter

- (0:58) SAC – Danny Scudero 16-yard run (Zach Schreiner kick) (Drive: 11 plays, 80 yards, 4:20; Sacramento State 7–0)

Second Quarter

- (12:47) MTST – Jon Johnson 16-yard interception return (Brendan Hall kick) (Drive: 2 plays, 1 yard, 0:32; Tied 7–7)
- (3:46) MTST – Ty McCullouch 21-yard pass from Sean Chambers (Brendan Hall kick) (Drive: 8 plays, 75 yards, 4:44; Montana State 14–7)

Third Quarter

- (10:10) MTST – Tommy Mellott 11-yard run (Brendan Hall kick) (Drive: 3 plays, 26 yards, 1:16; Montana State 21–7)
- (8:48) SAC – Elijah Tau-Tolliver 53-yard run (Zach Schreiner kick) (Drive: 4 plays, 75 yards, 1:22; Montana State 21–14)
- (6:09) SAC – Zach Schreiner 26-yard field goal (Drive: 5 plays, 17 yards, 2:30; Montana State 21–17)

Fourth Quarter

- (14:53) MTST – Tommy Mellott 9-yard run (Brendan Hall kick) (Drive: 11 plays, 90 yards, 6:11; Montana State 28–17)
- (10:02) SAC – Elijah Tau-Tolliver 10-yard run (Zach Schreiner kick) (Drive: 12 plays, 75 yards, 4:51; Montana State 28–24)
- (8:26) MTST – Julius Davis 1-yard run (Brendan Hall kick) (Drive: 4 plays, 63 yards, 1:31; Montana State 35–24)
- (5:05) MTST – Jared White 12-yard run (Brendan Hall kick) (Drive: 4 plays, 28 yards, 2:31; Montana State 42–24)
- (1:27) SAC – Devin Gandy 7-yard pass from Kaiden Bennett (two-point pass conversion failed) (Drive: 11 plays, 75 yards, 3:38; Montana State 42–30)

Line

- MTST –10.5

Over/Under

- 59.5

| Statistics | MTST | SAC |
|---|---|---|
| First downs | 26 | 25 |
| Total yards | 448 | 434 |
| Rushing yards | 328 | 200 |
| Passing yards | 120 | 234 |
| Passing: Comp–Att–Int | 10–16–1 | 26–42–2 |
| Time of possession | 32:40 | 27:20 |

| Team | Category | Player | Statistics |
|---|---|---|---|
| Montana State | Passing | Tommy Mellott | 9/14, 99 yards |
| Montana State | Rushing | Julius Davis | 12 carries, 110 yards, TD |
| Montana State | Receiving | Ty McCullough | 4 receptions, 53 yards, TD |
| Sacramento State | Passing | Kaiden Bennett | 26/42, 234 yards, TD, 2 INT |
| Sacramento State | Rushing | Elijah Tau-Tolliver | 8 carries, 100 yards, 2 TD |
| Sacramento State | Receiving | Devin Gandy | 5 receptions, 59 yards, TD |

=== Idaho State ===
Idaho State Bengals (3–4) at No. 6 Sacramento State Hornets (5–2) – Game summary

| Quarter | 1 | 2 | 3 | 4 | Total |
|---|---|---|---|---|---|
| Bengals | 0 | 16 | 0 | 0 | 16 |
| No. 6 Hornets | 14 | 10 | 20 | 7 | 51 |

at Hornet Stadium, Sacramento, CA

- Date: October 28, 2023
- Game time: 6:00 p.m. PST
- Game weather: 65 °F (18 °C) • N 14 mph • Sunny
- Game attendance: 13,733
- Referee: Jeff Rink
- TV announcers (KMAX-TV/ESPN+): Play-by-Play: Jason Ross, Jr. • Analysis: Darren Arbet

Game information

First Quarter

- (11:17) SAC – Jared Gipson 23-yard pass from Kaiden Bennett (Zach Schreiner kick) (Drive: 9 plays, 75 yards, 3:43; Sacramento State 7–0)
- (0:45) SAC – Coleman Kuntz 1-yard run (Zach Schreiner kick) (Drive: 9 plays, 86 yards, 4:12; Sacramento State 14–0)

Second Quarter

- (14:05) ISU – Chedon James 25-yard pass from Hunter Hays (Thomas Kopcho kick failed) (Drive: 5 plays, 48 yards, 1:36; Sacramento State 14–6)
- (7:14) ISU – Thomas Kopcho 27-yard field goal (Drive: 10 plays, 71 yards, 4:14; Sacramento State 14–9)
- (5:46) ISU – Alfred Jordan Jr. 16-yard pass from Hunter Hays (Thomas Kopcho kick) (Drive: 5 plays, 37 yards, 1:28; Idaho State 16–14)
- (3:13) SAC – Devin Gandy 13-yard pass from Carson Conklin (Zach Schreiner kick) (Drive: 7 plays, 61 yards, 2:27; Sacramento State 21–16)
- (0:00) SAC – Zach Schreiner 30-yard field goal (Drive: 8 plays, 83 yards, 1:12; Sacramento State 24–16)

Third Quarter

- (7:53) SAC – Carlos Hill 69-yard pass from Carson Conklin (two-point run conversion failed) (Drive: 2 plays, 73 yards, 0:34; Sacramento State 30–16)
- (3:04) SAC – Elijah Tau-Tolliver 4-yard run (Zach Schreiner kick) (Drive: 8 plays, 35 yards, 3:34; Sacramento State 37–16)
- (1:17) SAC – Michael Johnson 8-yard run (Zach Schreiner kick) (Drive: 4 plays, 29 yards, 1:16; Sacramento State 44–16)

Fourth Quarter

- (8:30) SAC – Marshel Martin 6-yard pass from Carson Conklin (Zach Schreiner kick) (Drive: 12 plays, 53 yards, 6:57; Sacramento State 51–16)

Line

- SAC –17.0

Over/Under

- 63.5

| Statistics | ISU | SAC |
|---|---|---|
| First downs | 16 | 26 |
| Total yards | 334 | 587 |
| Rushing yards | 42 | 273 |
| Passing yards | 292 | 314 |
| Passing: Comp–Att–Int | 30–56–4 | 21–32–1 |
| Time of possession | 24:55 | 35:05 |

| Team | Category | Player | Statistics |
|---|---|---|---|
| Idaho State | Passing | Hunter Hays | 17/31, 193 yards, 2 TD, 2 INT |
| Idaho State | Rushing | Hunter Hays | 7 carries, 22 yards |
| Idaho State | Receiving | Chedon James | 10 receptions, 77 yards, TD |
| Sacramento State | Passing | Carson Conklin | 14/21, 235 yards, 3 TD |
| Sacramento State | Rushing | Zeke Burnett | 9 carries, 143 yards |
| Sacramento State | Receiving | Marshel Martin | 6 receptions, 103 yards, TD |

=== at No. 4 Montana ===
No. 7 Sacramento State Hornets (6–2) at No. 4 Montana Grizzlies (7–1) – Game summary

| Quarter | 1 | 2 | 3 | 4 | Total |
|---|---|---|---|---|---|
| No. 7 Hornets | 7 | 0 | 0 | 0 | 7 |
| No. 4 Grizzlies | 7 | 14 | 0 | 13 | 34 |

at Washington–Grizzly Stadium, Missoula, MT

- Date: November 4, 2023
- Game time: 5:00 p.m. PST
- Game weather: 47 °F (8 °C) • NE 15 mph • Cloudy
- Game attendance: 25,888
- Referee: Scott Root
- TV announcers (KMAX-TV/ESPN+): Play-by-Play: Jay Kohn • Analysis: Marty Mornhinweg • Sideline: Kyle Hansen

Game information

First Quarter

- (6:45) SAC – Marcus Fulcher 1-yard run (Zach Schreiner kick) (Drive: 5 plays, 55 yards, 1:44; Sacramento State 7–0)
- (0:39) MONT – Eli Gillman 8-yard run (Nico Ramos kick) (Drive: 13 plays, 75 yards, 6:06; Tied 7–7)

Second Quarter

- (13:35) MONT – Nick Ostmo 9-yard run (Nico Ramos kick) (Drive: 2 plays, 33 yards, 0:34; Montana 14–7)
- (8:00) MONT – Aaron Fontes 9-yard pass from Clifton McDowell (Nico Ramos kick) (Drive: 7 plays, 77 yards, 3:45; Montana 21–7)

Fourth Quarter

- (11:03) MONT – Keelan White 97-yard pass from Clifton McDowell (Nico Ramos kick) (Drive: 2 plays, 99 yards, 0:48; Montana 28–7)
- (7:11) MONT – Nick Ostmo 10-yard run (Nico Ramos kick failed) (Drive: 6 plays, 75 yards, 3:18; Montana 34–7)

Line

- MONT –2.5

Over/Under

- 53.5

| Statistics | SAC | MONT |
|---|---|---|
| First downs | 17 | 21 |
| Total yards | 268 | 547 |
| Rushing yards | 149 | 305 |
| Passing yards | 119 | 242 |
| Passing: Comp–Att–Int | 15–39–0 | 12–22–1 |
| Time of possession | 24:19 | 35:41 |

| Team | Category | Player | Statistics |
|---|---|---|---|
| Sacramento State | Passing | Carson Conklin | 7/22, 67 yards |
| Sacramento State | Rushing | Marcus Fulcher | 11 carries, 87 yards, TD |
| Sacramento State | Receiving | Carlos Hill | 4 receptions, 53 yards |
| Montana | Passing | Clifton McDowell | 11/21, 218 yards, 2 TD, INT |
| Montana | Rushing | Eli Gillman | 16 carries, 113 yards, TD |
| Montana | Receiving | Keelan White | 2 receptions, 103 yards, TD |

=== Cal Poly ===
Cal Poly Mustangs (3–6) at No. 9 Sacramento State Hornets (6–3) – Game summary

| Quarter | 1 | 2 | 3 | 4 | Total |
|---|---|---|---|---|---|
| Mustangs | 10 | 13 | 7 | 0 | 30 |
| No. 9 Hornets | 14 | 17 | 7 | 3 | 41 |

at Hornet Stadium, Sacramento, CA

- Date: November 11, 2023
- Game time: 2:00 p.m. PST
- Game weather: 69 °F (21 °C) • NW 3 mph • Sunny
- Game attendance: 12,022
- Referee: Kelly Holman
- TV announcers (KMAX-TV/ESPN+): Play-by-Play: Jason Ross, Jr. • Analysis: Darren Arbet

Game information

First Quarter

- (10:14) CP – Noah Serna 26-yard field goal (Drive: 8 plays, 64 yards, 4:43; Cal Poly 3–0)
- (7:55) SAC – Elijah Tau-Tolliver 34-yard run (Zach Schreiner kick) (Drive: 6 plays, 63 yards, 2:12; Sacramento State 7–3)
- (5:41) SAC – Devin Gandy 7-yard pass from Carson Conklin (Zach Schreiner kick) (Drive: 4 plays, 66 yards, 1:10; Sacramento State 14–3)
- (2:37) CP – Michael Briscoe 29-yard pass from Sam Huard (Noah Serna kick) (Drive: 7 plays, 75 yards, 3:04; Sacramento State 14–10)

Second Quarter

- (8:27) CP – Noah Serna 44-yard field goal (Drive: 11 plays, 58 yards, 4:17; Sacramento State 14–13)
- (6:27) SAC – Marshel Martin 39-yard pass from Carson Conklin (Zach Schreiner kick) (Drive: 4 plays, 54 yards, 1:38; Sacramento State 21–13)
- (2:27) SAC – Carlos Hill 15-yard pass from Carson Conklin (Zach Schreiner kick) (Drive: 5 plays, 75 yards, 2:10; Sacramento State 28–13)
- (1:39) CP – Michael Briscoe 52-yard pass from Sam Huard (Noah Serna kick) (Drive: 4 plays, 80 yards, 0:42; Sacramento State 28–20)
- (0:18) CP – Noah Serna 23-yard field goal (Drive: 9 plays, 78 yards, 0:52; Sacramento State 28–23)
- (0:00) SAC – Zach Schreiner 32-yard field goal (Drive: 2 plays, 47 yards, 0:12; Sacramento State 31–23)

Third Quarter

- (11:13) SAC – Elijah Tau-Tolliver 4-yard run (Zach Schreiner kick) (Drive: 1 play, 4 yards, 0:04; Sacramento State 38–23)
- (3:27) CP – Paul Holyfield Jr. 3-yard run (Noah Serna kick) (Drive: 8 plays, 69 yards, 4:04; Sacramento State 38–30)

Fourth Quarter

- (12:28) SAC – Zach Schreiner 22-yard field goal (Drive: 10 plays, 70 yards, 5:54; Sacramento State 41–30)

Line

- SAC –29.5

Over/Under

- 60.5

| Statistics | CP | SAC |
|---|---|---|
| First downs | 24 | 23 |
| Total yards | 539 | 538 |
| Rushing yards | 45 | 225 |
| Passing yards | 494 | 313 |
| Passing: Comp–Att–Int | 38–59–2 | 17–26–1 |
| Time of possession | 29:37 | 30:23 |

| Team | Category | Player | Statistics |
|---|---|---|---|
| Cal Poly | Passing | Sam Huard | 37/58, 483 yards, 2 TD, 2 INT |
| Cal Poly | Rushing | Paul Holyfield Jr. | 7 carries, 27 yards, TD |
| Cal Poly | Receiving | Michael Briscoe | 3 receptions, 124 yards, 2 TD |
| Sacramento State | Passing | Carson Conklin | 17/26, 313 yards, 3 TD, INT |
| Sacramento State | Rushing | Marcus Fulcher | 20 carries, 121 yards |
| Sacramento State | Receiving | Jared Gipson | 5 receptions, 154 yards |

=== at UC Davis ===
No. 8 Sacramento State Hornets (7–3) at UC Davis Aggies (6–4) – Game summary

| Quarter | 1 | 2 | 3 | 4 | Total |
|---|---|---|---|---|---|
| No. 8 Hornets | 0 | 0 | 7 | 14 | 21 |
| Aggies | 14 | 3 | 0 | 14 | 31 |

at UC Davis Health Stadium, Davis, CA

- Date: November 18, 2023
- Game time: 12:00 p.m. PST
- Game weather: Sunny
- Game attendance: 11,622
- Referee: Jeff Reid
- TV announcers (ESPN+): Play-by-Play: Scott Marsh • Analysis: Scott Gordon

Game information

First Quarter

- (10:00) UCD – Lan Larison 3-yard run (Hunter Ridley kick) (Drive: 10 plays, 75 yards, 5:00; UC Davis 7–0)
- (0:46) UCD – Lan Larison 7-yard run (Hunter Ridley kick) (Drive: 6 plays, 50 yards, 3:54; UC Davis 14–0)

Second Quarter

- (8:27) UCD – Hunter Ridley 42-yard field goal (Drive: 9 plays, 40 yards, 3:58; UC Davis 17–0)

Third Quarter

- (0:55) SAC – Anderson Grover 16-yard pass from Kaiden Bennett (Zach Schreiner kick) (Drive: 6 plays, 74 yards, 1:55; UC Davis 17–7)

Fourth Quarter

- (9:54) UCD – Lan Larison 47-yard pass from Miles Hastings (Hunter Ridley kick) (Drive: 5 plays, 68 yards, 2:58; UC Davis 24–7)
- (5:46) SAC – Jared Gipson 14-yard pass from Kaiden Bennett (Zach Schreiner kick) (Drive: 10 plays, 73 yards, 4:07; UC Davis 24–14)
- (3:30) UCD – Lan Larison 12-yard run (Hunter Ridley kick) (Drive: 2 plays, 18 yards, 0:53; UC Davis 31–14)
- (2:26) SAC – Carlos Hill 35-yard pass from Kaiden Bennett (Zach Schreiner kick) (Drive: 4 plays, 55 yards, 0:57; UC Davis 31–21)

Line

- UCD –2.0

Over/Under

- 53.5

| Statistics | SAC | UCD |
|---|---|---|
| First downs | 22 | 17 |
| Total yards | 388 | 308 |
| Rushing yards | 27 | 133 |
| Passing yards | 361 | 175 |
| Passing: Comp–Att–Int | 32–53–2 | 16–23–0 |
| Time of possession | 28:07 | 31:53 |

| Team | Category | Player | Statistics |
|---|---|---|---|
| Sacramento State | Passing | Kaiden Bennett | 19/28, 232 yards, 3 TD, INT |
| Sacramento State | Rushing | Marcus Fulcher | 10 carries, 23 yards |
| Sacramento State | Receiving | Carlos Hill | 10 receptions, 144 yards, TD |
| UC Davis | Passing | Miles Hastings | 16/23, 175 yards, TD |
| UC Davis | Rushing | Lan Larison | 28 carries, 121 yards, 3 TD |
| UC Davis | Receiving | Lan Larison | 3 receptions, 54 yards, TD |

== FCS Playoffs ==
=== at No. 12 North Dakota – First Round ===
FCS Playoffs First Round: No. 15 Sacramento State Hornets (7–4) at No. 12 North Dakota Fighting Hawks (7–4) – Game summary

| Quarter | 1 | 2 | 3 | 4 | Total |
|---|---|---|---|---|---|
| No. 15 Hornets | 14 | 14 | 0 | 14 | 42 |
| No. 12 Fighting Hawks | 7 | 7 | 14 | 7 | 35 |

at Alerus Center, Grand Forks, ND

- Date: November 25, 2023
- Game time: 10:00 a.m. PST
- Game weather: 72 °F (22 °C) • Indoors
- Game attendance: 6,522
- Referee: James Brookhart
- TV announcers (ESPN+): Play-by-Play: David Saltzman • Analysis: Jay Walker

Game information

First Quarter

- (11:55) SAC – Kaiden Bennett 1-yard run (Zach Schreiner kick) (Drive: 7 plays, 75 yards, 3:05; Sacramento State 7–0)
- (9:59) UND – Gaven Ziebarth 7-yard run (C.J. Elrichs kick) (Drive: 4 plays, 75 yards, 1:51; Tied 7–7)
- (5:51) SAC – Anderson Grover 14-yard pass from Kaiden Bennett (Zach Schreiner kick) (Drive: 8 plays, 75 yards, 4:08; Sacramento State 14–7)

Second Quarter

- (12:51) SAC – Coleman Kuntz 1-yard run (Zach Schreiner kick) (Drive: 13 plays, 84 yards, 5:24; Sacramento State 21–7)
- (6:54) UND – Gaven Ziebarth 14-yard run (C.J. Elrichs kick) (Drive: 11 plays, 73 yards, 5:51; Sacramento State 21–14)
- (2:49) SAC – Coleman Kuntz 1-yard run (Zach Schreiner kick) (Drive: 9 plays, 75 yards, 4:05; Sacramento State 28–14)

Third Quarter

- (8:10) UND – Bo Belquist 7-yard pass from Tommy Schuster (C.J. Elrichs kick) (Drive: 13 plays, 54 yards, 6:44; Sacramento State 28–21)
- (2:07) UND – Quincy Vaughn 1-yard run (C.J. Elrichs kick) (Drive: 9 plays, 56 yards, 4:31; Tied 28–28)

Fourth Quarter

- (11:52) SAC – Marcus Fulcher 4-yard run (Zach Schreiner kick) (Drive: 5 plays, 67 yards, 1:18; Sacramento State 35–28)
- (8:10) UND – Quincy Vaughn 2-yard run (C.J. Elrichs kick) (Drive: 7 plays, 76 yards, 3:37; Tied 35–35)
- (4:54) SAC – Kaiden Bennett 4-yard run (Zach Schreiner kick) (Drive: 7 plays, 75 yards, 3:16; Sacramento State 42–35)

Line

- UND –3.0

Over/Under

- 59.5

| Statistics | SAC | UND |
|---|---|---|
| First downs | 26 | 21 |
| Total yards | 458 | 358 |
| Rushing yards | 244 | 221 |
| Passing yards | 212 | 137 |
| Passing: Comp–Att–Int | 18–23–0 | 11–18–1 |
| Time of possession | 26:36 | 33:24 |

| Team | Category | Player | Statistics |
|---|---|---|---|
| Sacramento State | Passing | Kaiden Bennett | 17/22, 207 yards, TD |
| Sacramento State | Rushing | Kaiden Bennett | 13 carries, 126 yards, 2 TD |
| Sacramento State | Receiving | Anderson Grover | 6 receptions, 96 yards, TD |
| North Dakota | Passing | Tommy Schuster | 11/17, 137 yards, TD, INT |
| North Dakota | Rushing | Gaven Ziebarth | 18 carries, 96 yards, 2 TD |
| North Dakota | Receiving | Bo Belquist | 5 receptions, 90 yards, TD |

=== at No. 3 South Dakota – Second Round ===
FCS Playoffs Second Round: No. 15 Sacramento State Hornets (8–4) at No. 3 South Dakota Coyotes (9–2) – Game summary

| Quarter | 1 | 2 | 3 | 4 | Total |
|---|---|---|---|---|---|
| No. 15 Hornets | 0 | 14 | 0 | 10 | 24 |
| No. 3 Coyotes | 3 | 21 | 7 | 3 | 34 |

at DakotaDome, Vermillion, SD

- Date: December 2, 2023
- Game time: 11:00 a.m. PST
- Game weather: 72 °F (22 °C) • Indoors
- Game attendance: 6,288
- Referee: Tim Barker
- TV announcers (ESPN+): Play-by-Play: Jack Benjamin • Analysis: Craig Haubert

Game information

First Quarter

- (0:59) USD – Will Leyland 37-yard field goal (Drive: 14 plays, 70 yards, 8:12; South Dakota 3–0)

Second Quarter

- (14:55) USD – Javion Phelps 18-yard pass from Aidan Bouman (Will Leyland kick) (Drive: 4 plays, 33 yards, 0:54; South Dakota 10–0)
- (14:17) USD – Mi'Quise Grace 56-yard fumble return (Will Leyland kick) (Drive: 2 plays, 31 yards, 0:38; South Dakota 17–0)
- (9:31) SAC – Marcus Fulcher 2-yard run (Zach Schreiner kick) (Drive: 10 plays, 75 yards, 4:46; South Dakota 17–7)
- (8:38) USD – JJ Galbreath 75-yard pass from Aidan Bouman (Will Leyland kick) (Drive: 2 plays, 75 yards, 0:53; South Dakota 24–7)
- (0:14) SAC – Marcus Fulcher 2-yard run (Zach Schreiner kick) (Drive: 8 plays, 59 yards, 3:46; South Dakota 24–14)

Third Quarter

- (0:20) USD – Travis Theis 3-yard run (Will Leyland kick) (Drive: 10 plays, 63 yards, 5:14; South Dakota 31–14)

Fourth Quarter

- (11:54) SAC – Zach Schreiner 28-yard field goal (Drive: 8 plays, 65 yards, 3:26; South Dakota 31–17)
- (5:06) USD – Will Leyland 34-yard field goal (Drive: 7 plays, 73 yards, 3:42; South Dakota 34–17)
- (1:37) SAC – Jared Gipson 3-yard pass from Carson Camp (Zach Schreiner kick) (Drive: 10 plays, 56 yards, 3:19; South Dakota 34–24)

Line

- USD –4.0

Over/Under

- 50.5

| Statistics | SAC | USD |
|---|---|---|
| First downs | 18 | 15 |
| Total yards | 350 | 368 |
| Rushing yards | 148 | 194 |
| Passing yards | 202 | 174 |
| Passing: Comp–Att–Int | 17–30–1 | 11–17–0 |
| Time of possession | 27:13 | 32:47 |

| Team | Category | Player | Statistics |
|---|---|---|---|
| Sacramento State | Passing | Carson Camp | 14/23, 168 yards, TD |
| Sacramento State | Rushing | Marcus Fulcher | 13 carries, 67 yards, 2 TD |
| Sacramento State | Receiving | Anderson Grover | 3 receptions, 79 yards |
| South Dakota | Passing | Aidan Bouman | 11/16, 174 yards, 2 TD |
| South Dakota | Rushing | Charles Pierre Jr. | 13 carries, 123 yards |
| South Dakota | Receiving | JJ Galbreath | 1 reception, 75 yards, TD |

== Ranking movements ==
Ranking movements Legend: ██ Increase in ranking ██ Decrease in ranking ( ) = First-place votes
| | Week | | | | | | | | | | | | | |
| Poll | Pre | 1 | 2 | 3 | 4 | 5 | 6 | 7 | 8 | 9 | 10 | 11 | 12 | Final |
|---|---|---|---|---|---|---|---|---|---|---|---|---|---|---|
| STATS FCS | 10 | 9 | 8 | 4 (1) | 8 | 4 | 4 | 3 | 6 | 7 | 9 | 8 | 15 | 13 |
| Coaches | 8 | 8 | 6 | 4 | 9 | 7 | 5 | 4 | 7 | 7 | 11 | 10 | 16 | 16 |
