= Max Komar =

American football player (born 1987)

No. 18, 83
- Position: Wide receiver

Personal information
- Born: April 30, 1987 (age 39); Lakewood, Washington, U.S.
- Listed height: 5 ft 11 in (1.80 m)
- Listed weight: 202 lb (92 kg)

Career information
- High school: Auburn Riverside (Auburn, Washington)
- College: Idaho
- NFL draft: 2010: undrafted

Career history
- Arizona Cardinals (2010); Chicago Bears (2011)

Career NFL statistics
- Receptions: 12
- Receiving yards: 117
- Stats at Pro Football Reference

Max David Komar (born April 30, 1987) is an American former professional football player who was a wide receiver in the National Football League (NFL). He played college football for the Idaho Vandals and was signed by the Arizona Cardinals as an undrafted free agent in 2010.

== Early life ==
Komar attended Auburn Riverside High School in Auburn, Washington, where he recorded 113 receptions for 930 yards on the football team. Despite earning all-state honors as a senior, he did not receive any scholarship offers and decided to play college football for the Idaho Vandals as a walk-on.

== College career ==
As a freshman at Idaho in 2005, Komar took a redshirt. The following season, he earned a starting spot and caught 17 passes for 313 yards. After being awarded a scholarship by first-year head coach Robb Akey, Komar emerged as Idaho's leading receiver in 2007, recording 30 receptions for 445 yards and four touchdowns. His stats declined in 2008 due to the offense heavily relying on Eddie Williams. In the 2009 Humanitarian Bowl, Komar caught a touchdown with four seconds left, which allowed the Vandals to win the game on a two-point conversion. He finished his final college season with 63 catches for 1,052 yards and 11 touchdowns.

== Professional career ==
After going unselected in the 2010 NFL draft, Komar signed with the Arizona Cardinals as an undrafted free agent. He was the Cardinals' leading receiver the 2010 preseason – catching 12 passes for 200 yards and a touchdown – and made the final 53-man roster. Komar's signing bonus of $3,000 was the lowest of the four free agents who eventually made the team. He made his NFL debut in the season opener against the St. Louis Rams, catching two passes for 29 yards. Komar finished his rookie season with 12 receptions for 117 yards in eight games played. However, after suffering an injury the following preseason, he waived/injured on August 29, 2011. On October 11, 2011, Komar was signed to the Chicago Bears practice squad. He was promoted to the main roster in December following a season-ending injury to Johnny Knox. Komar appeared in two games for the Bears and was released in April 2012.
