= Andy Thompson (American football) =

American football player and coach (born 1980)

Current position
- Title: Inside linebackers coach
- Team: Stanford
- Conference: ACC

Biographical details
- Born: April 30, 1980 (age 46); Walla Walla, Washington, U.S.

Playing career
- 1999–2003: Montana
- Positions: Linebacker, quarterback, safety

Coaching career (HC unless noted)
- 2004: Eastern Oregon (LB/ST)
- 2005–2006: Northern Arizona (RB)
- 2007–2008: Northern Arizona (LB)
- 2009–2018: Northern Arizona (DC)
- 2019–2022: Sacramento State (DC)
- 2023–2024: Sacramento State
- 2025: Stanford (AHC/co-DC/ILB)
- 2026–present: Stanford (ILB)

Head coaching record
- Overall: 11–14
- Tournaments: 1–1 (NCAA D-I playoffs)

Andrew Thompson (born April 30, 1980) is an American football coach and former player, currently the inside linebackers coach for the Stanford Cardinal football program. Thompson was the head coach at Sacramento State from 2023 to 2024. Formerly the Hornets' defensive coordinator for four seasons under Troy Taylor, he was promoted in December 2022 after Taylor left for Stanford University.

== Head coaching record ==
| Year | Team | Overall | Conference | Standing | Bowl/playoffs |
|---|---|---|---|---|---|
Sacramento State Hornets (Big Sky Conference) (2023–2024)
| 2023 | Sacramento State | 8–5 | 4–4 | T–6th | L NCAA Division I Second Round |
| 2024 | Sacramento State | 3–9 | 1–7 | T–11th | |
| Sacramento State: | | 11–14 | 5–11 | | |
| Total: | | 11–14 | | | |
