= Tony Corbin =

American gridiron football player

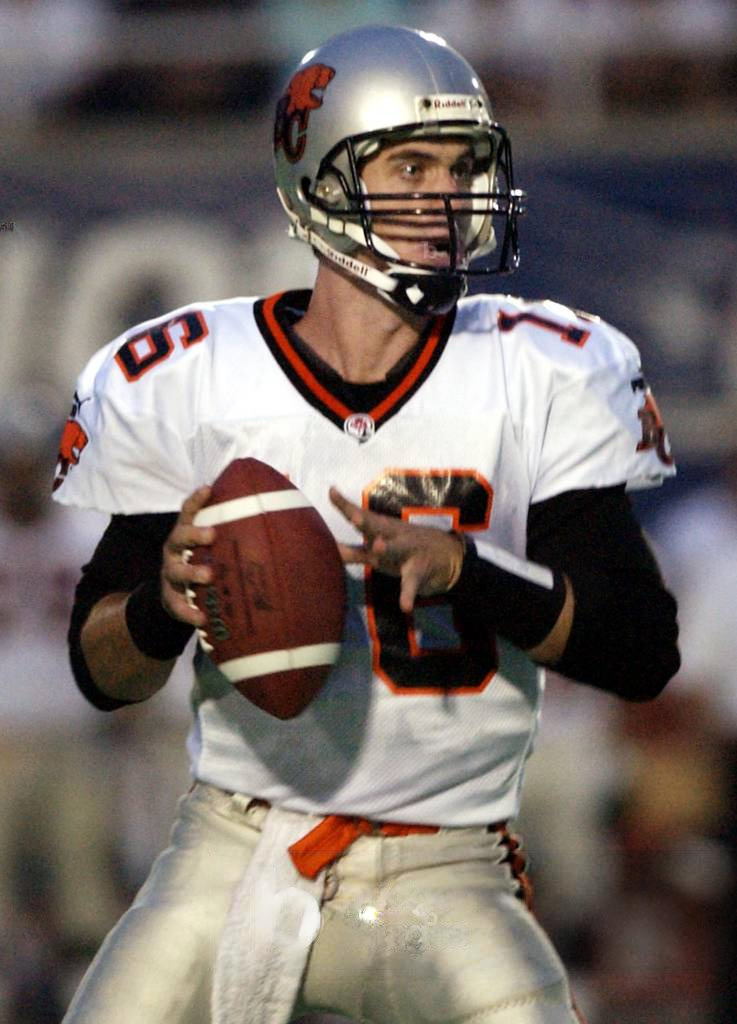
- Corbin with the BC Lions in 2001

No. 16
- Position: Quarterback

Personal information
- Born: March 21, 1974 (age 52); Turlock, California, U.S.
- Listed height: 6 ft 4 in (1.93 m)
- Listed weight: 216 lb (98 kg)

Career information
- High school: Turlock (CA)
- College: Sacramento State
- NFL draft: 1997: 7th round, 237th overall pick

Career history
- 1997: San Diego Chargers*
- 1998: Frankfurt Galaxy*
- 1998: Portland Forest Dragons*
- 1998: New York CityHawks
- 1999: Florida Bobcats
- 2001: BC Lions
- 2002: Winnipeg Blue Bombers*
- * Offseason or practice squad member only
- Stats at ArenaFan.com

Anton Christian Corbin (born March 21, 1974) is an American former professional football quarterback who played one season with the BC Lions of the Canadian Football League (CFL). He was selected by the San Diego Chargers in the seventh round of the 1997 NFL draft. Corbin played college football at California State University, Sacramento. He was also a member of the Frankfurt Galaxy, Portland Forest Dragons, New York CityHawks, Florida Bobcats, and Winnipeg Blue Bombers.

== Early life ==
Corbin attended Turlock High School in Turlock, California.

== Professional career ==
=== San Diego Chargers ===
Corbin was drafted by the San Diego Chargers in the seventh round with the 237th overall pick in the 1997 NFL draft. He was released in August 1997.

=== Frankfurt Galaxy ===
Corbin was drafted by the Frankfurt Galaxy with the 101st pick in the 1998 NFL Europe League draft. He was released in March 1998.

=== Portland Forest Dragons ===
Corbin signed with the Portland Forest Dragons of the Arena Football League (AFL) in April 1998.

=== New York CityHawks ===
Corbin was traded to the New York CityHawks where he played during the 1998 season.

=== Florida Bobcats ===
Corbin played in one game for the Florida Bobcats of the AFL in 1999 but did not record any statistics.

=== BC Lions ===
Corbin was signed by the BC Lions of the Canadian Football League (CFL) on April 5, 2001. He started 2 games during the 2001 season and was released in January 2002.

=== Winnipeg Blue Bombers ===
Corbin signed with the CFL's Winnipeg Blue Bombers in May 2002 but was released before the start of the season.
