= Troy Mills (Canadian football) =

American gridiron football player (born 1966)

Profile
- Position: Running back

Personal information
- Born: January 7, 1966 (age 60); Glendale, California
- Listed height: 6 ft 0 in (1.83 m)
- Listed weight: 212 lb (96 kg)

Career information
- College: Sacramento State

Career history
- 1993–1994: Sacramento Gold Miners (CFL)
- 1995: San Antonio Texans (CFL)
- 1996: Ottawa Rough Riders (CFL)
- 1998–2000: Edmonton Eskimos (CFL)
- 2001: Winnipeg Blue Bombers (CFL)
- 2003: Edmonton Eskimos (CFL)

Awards and highlights
- Grey Cup champion (2003)

Troy Mills (born January 7, 1966, in Glendale, California) was a Canadian Football League running back who played nine seasons for six different teams.
