= DeAndre Carter =

American football player (born 1993)

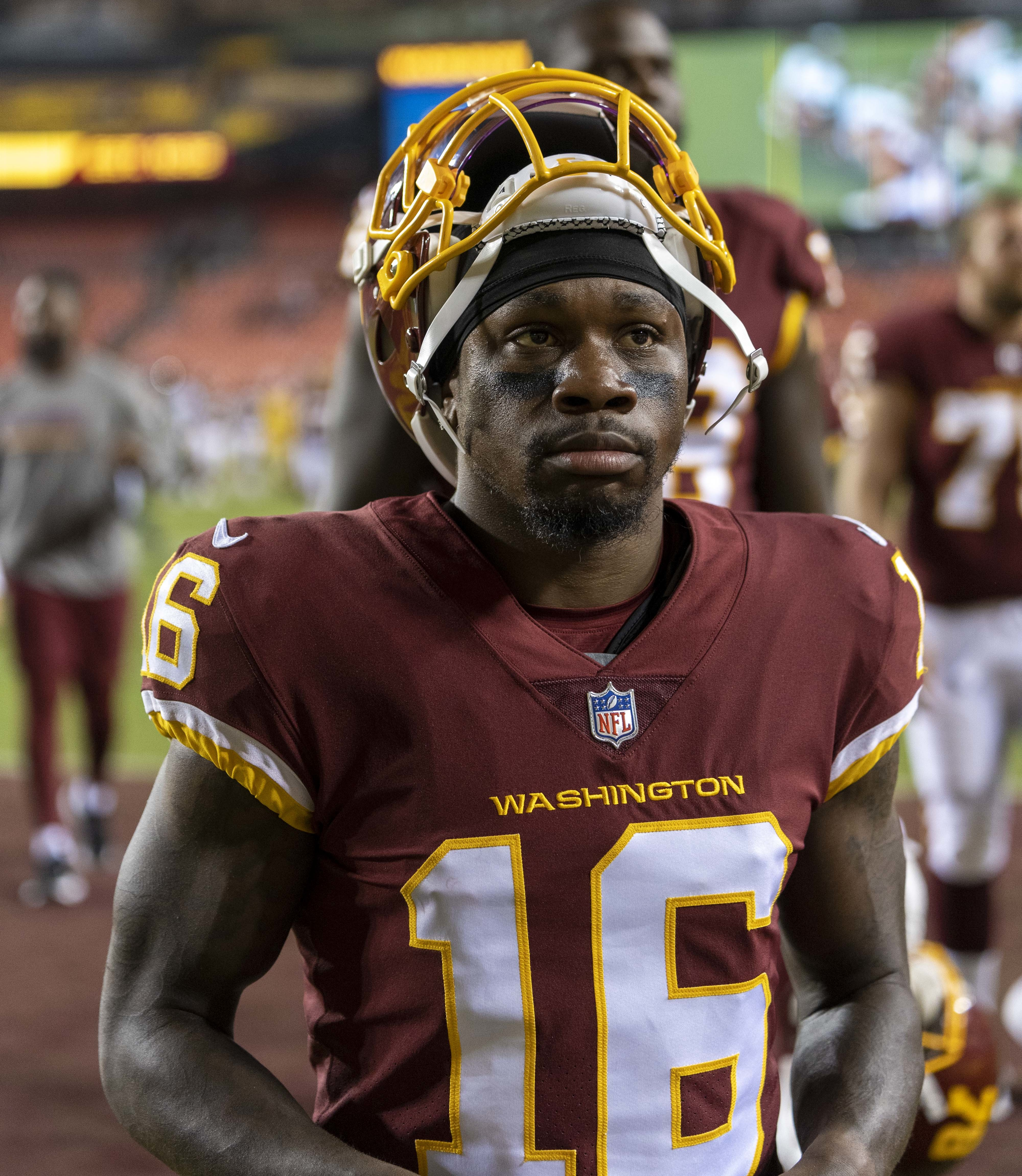
- Carter with the Washington Football Team in 2021

No. 86 – Detroit Lions
- Position: Wide receiver / Return specialist
- Roster status: Active

Personal information
- Born: April 10, 1993 (age 33); San Jose, California, U.S.
- Listed height: 5 ft 8 in (1.73 m)
- Listed weight: 188 lb (85 kg)

Career information
- High school: Washington (Fremont, California)
- College: Sacramento State (2011–2014)
- NFL draft: 2015: undrafted

Career history
- Baltimore Ravens (2015)*; Oakland Raiders (2015)*; New England Patriots (2015–2016)*; San Francisco 49ers (2017–2018)*; Philadelphia Eagles (2018); Houston Texans (2018–2020); Chicago Bears (2020); Washington Football Team (2021); Los Angeles Chargers (2022); Las Vegas Raiders (2023); Chicago Bears (2024); Cleveland Browns (2025); Detroit Lions (2026–present)
- * Offseason or practice squad member only

Awards and highlights
- First-team FCS All-American (2014); 2× First-team All-Big Sky (2013, 2014)

Career NFL statistics as of Week 10, 2026
- Receptions: 118
- Receiving yards: 1,336
- Return yards: 5,022
- Rushing yards: 99
- Total touchdowns: 7
- Stats at Pro Football Reference

DeAndre Carter (born April 10, 1993) is an American professional football wide receiver and return specialist for the Detroit Lions of the National Football League (NFL). He played college football for the Sacramento State Hornets before signing with the Baltimore Ravens as an undrafted free agent following the 2015 NFL Draft.

== College career ==
Carter attended California State University, Sacramento, where he played wide receiver for the Sacramento State Hornets. He was named first-team Football Championship Subdivision (FCS) All-American in 2014 after recording 99 receptions for 1,321 yards and 17 touchdowns.

=== Statistics ===
Legend
	Led FCS
**Bold**	Career high

Year	Team	Games		Receiving				Rushing				Kick returns				Punt returns			
Year	Team	GP	GS	Rec	Yds	Avg	TD	Att	Yds	Avg	TD	Ret	Yds	Avg	TD	Ret	Yds	Avg	TD
2011	Sacramento State	8	4	12	161	13.4	0	1	14	**14.0**	0	**8**	170	21.3	0	0	0	0.0	0
2012	Sacramento State	10	6	32	344	10.8	4	0	0	0.0	0	7	**200**	**28.6**	0	**6**	56	9.3	0
2013	Sacramento State	11	11	64	934	**14.6**	14	**5**	**24**	4.8	**1**	3	55	18.3	0	0	0	0.0	0
2014	Sacramento State	**12**	**12**	**99**	**1,321**	13.3	**17**	4	4	1.0	0	0	0	0.0	0	4	**69**	**17.3**	**1**
Career		41	33	207	2,760	13.3	35	10	42	4.2	1	18	425	23.7	0	10	125	12.5	1

== Professional career ==
Pre-draft measurables
Height	Weight	Arm length	Hand span	Wingspan	40-yard dash	10-yard split	20-yard split	20-yard shuttle	Three-cone drill	Vertical jump	Broad jump	Bench press
5 ft 8 1/2 in (1.74 m)	185 lb (84 kg)	30 5/8 in (0.78 m)	8 3/4 in (0.22 m)	5 ft 11 1/4 in (1.81 m)	4.44 s	1.45 s	2.53 s	3.80 s	6.64 s	38.5 in (0.98 m)	10 ft 6 in (3.20 m)	17 reps
All values from Pro Day

=== Baltimore Ravens ===
Carter signed with the Baltimore Ravens on May 3, 2015. After a successful training camp, he seemed to have a chance of making the final roster. However, after failing to win the return job during the first three weeks of preseason, he was released by the Ravens on August 31, 2015, as part of the first wave of roster cuts.

=== Oakland Raiders ===
Carter signed to the practice squad of the Oakland Raiders on September 16, 2015, after the Raiders traded wide receiver Brice Butler to the Dallas Cowboys. On December 1, 2015, he was released from the practice squad.

=== New England Patriots ===
On December 15, 2015, Carter was signed by the New England Patriots to their practice squad. He was released on January 12, 2016, but was re-signed the next day. On January 26, 2016, Carter signed a futures contract with the Patriots.

On September 3, 2016, Carter was released by the Patriots as part of final roster cuts.

=== San Francisco 49ers ===
On February 24, 2017, Carter signed a two-year contract with the San Francisco 49ers. He was waived on September 2, 2017, and was signed to the practice squad the next day. He signed a reserve/future contract with the 49ers on January 2, 2018. On May 15, 2018, Carter was waived by the team.

=== Philadelphia Eagles ===
On July 28, 2018, Carter signed with the Philadelphia Eagles. He made the Eagles' final roster. In the 2018 season opener against the Atlanta Falcons, he recorded a 10-yard reception, the first of his NFL career, in the 18–12 victory. Carter took over kick and punt return duties with regular returner Darren Sproles sidelined with an injury. Carter was waived by the Eagles on September 18, 2018, after two games. He was re-signed to the team's practice squad on September 20. He was promoted back to the active roster on September 29, 2018. Carter was waived by the Eagles on November 6, 2018.

=== Houston Texans ===
On November 7, 2018, Carter was claimed off waivers by the Houston Texans.

On March 11, 2020, Carter was re-signed to a one-year contract by the Texans. On November 17, 2020, Carter was waived by the Texans.

=== Chicago Bears (first stint) ===
On November 18, 2020, Carter was claimed off waivers by the Chicago Bears. He was placed on the reserve/COVID-19 list by the team on December 10, and activated on December 22.

=== Washington Football Team ===
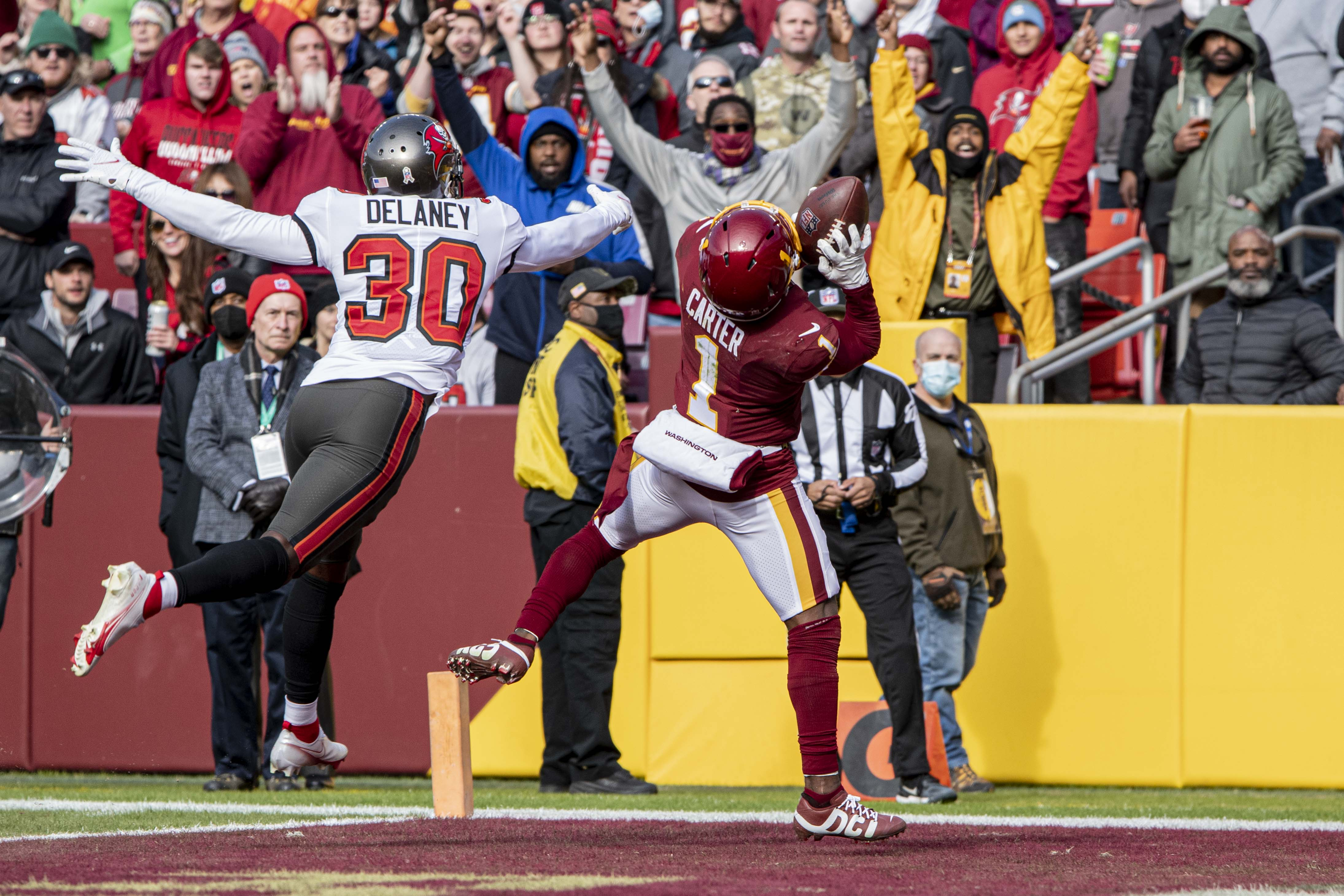
Carter scores a touchdown against the Tampa Bay Buccaneers in 2021

Carter signed with the Washington Football Team on April 1, 2021. He was named NFC Special Teams Player of the Week in Week 4 against the Falcons after he returned a kickoff 101 yards for his first career touchdown. Carter recorded his first career receiving touchdown in a Week 8 game against the Denver Broncos.

=== Los Angeles Chargers ===
Carter signed a one-year contract with the Los Angeles Chargers on April 8, 2022. In Week 1 against the Las Vegas Raiders, Carter totaled 64 yards and a touchdown on 3 receptions in the 24–19 victory.

=== Las Vegas Raiders ===
On March 30, 2023, Carter signed with the Raiders.

=== Chicago Bears (second stint) ===
On June 18, 2024, Carter signed a one-year contract to return with the Chicago Bears.

=== Cleveland Browns ===
On March 19, 2025, Carter signed a one-year, $800,000 contract with the Cleveland Browns. On September 29, Carter was placed on injured reserve due to a knee injury suffered in the team's Week 4 game against the Detroit Lions.

=== Detroit Lions ===
On October 15, 2026, Carter signed with the Detroit Lions practice squad. On October 22, Carter was added to the active roster.

== NFL career statistics ==
Legend
	Led the league
**Bold**	Career high

=== Regular season ===
Year	Team	Games		Receiving					Rushing					Punt returns					Kick returns				
Year	Team	GP	GS	Rec	Yds	Avg	Lng	TD	Att	Yds	Avg	Lng	TD	Ret	Yds	Avg	Lng	TD	Ret	Yds	Avg	Lng	TD
2018	PHI	7	1	2	21	10.5	11	0	0	0	0.0	0	0	10	103	10.3	**42**	0	10	204	20.4	30	0
2018	HOU	7	3	20	195	9.8	**50**	0	1	7	7.0	7	0	16	146	9.1	30	0	9	221	24.6	30	0
2019	HOU	16	3	11	162	**14.7**	46	0	0	0	0.0	0	0	22	214	9.7	23	0	14	308	22.0	31	0
2020	HOU	9	0	1	8	8.0	8	0	0	0	0.0	0	0	11	96	8.7	19	0	12	250	20.8	29	0
2020	CHI	4	0	0	0	0.0	0	0	0	0	0.0	0	0	4	30	7.5	13	0	0	0	0.0	0	0
2021	WAS	**17**	6	24	296	12.3	26	**3**	**10**	**89**	**8.9**	**27**	0	16	134	8.4	16	0	**36**	**904**	25.1	**101T**	**1**
2022	LAC	**17**	**7**	**46**	**538**	11.7	35	**3**	2	-15	-7.5	-5	0	**29**	**339**	**11.7**	28	0	26	497	19.1	33	0
2023	LV	**17**	1	4	39	9.8	16	0	3	18	6.0	15	0	24	232	9.7	32	0	11	262	23.8	40	0
2024	CHI	13	0	9	72	8.0	14	0	0	0	0.0	0	0	17	158	9.3	38	0	15	479	**31.9**	67	0
2025	CLE	4	0	0	0	0.0	0	0	0	0	0.0	0	0	6	56	9.3	15	0	11	274	24.9	32	0
2026	DET	4	0	1	5	5.0	5	0	0	0	0.0	0	0	3	21	7.0	15	0	4	94	23.5	28	0
Career		115	21	118	1,336	11.3	50	6	16	99	6.2	27	0	158	1,529	9.7	42	0	148	3,493	23.6	101T	1

=== Postseason ===
Year	Team	Games		Receiving					Rushing					Punt returns					Kick returns				
Year	Team	GP	GS	Rec	Yds	Avg	Lng	TD	Att	Yds	Avg	Lng	TD	Ret	Yds	Avg	Lng	TD	Ret	Yds	Avg	Lng	TD
2018	HOU	1	0	0	0	0.0	0	0	0	0	0.0	0	0	0	0	0.0	0	0	1	26	**26.0**	**26**	0
2019	HOU	**2**	**1**	2	**22**	**11.0**	**17**	0	0	0	0.0	0	0	**2**	**22**	**11.0**	**11**	0	**3**	**60**	20.0	**26**	0
2020	CHI	1	0	**3**	17	5.7	8	0	**1**	**3**	**3.0**	**3**	0	0	0	0.0	0	0	0	0	0.0	0	0
2022	LAC	1	0	2	17	8.5	14	0	0	0	0.0	0	0	0	0	0.0	0	0	0	0	0.0	0	0
Career		5	1	7	56	8.0	17	0	1	3	3.0	3	0	2	22	11.0	11	0	4	86	21.5	26	0

== Personal life ==
Carter's younger brother, Kaylan, died in 2013 after going into cardiac arrest during a weight training session with his football team in high school. At Sacramento State, Carter majored in communication studies. Carter served as a substitute teacher at Martin Luther King Middle School in 2016.
