= Zack Nash =

American football player (born 1989)

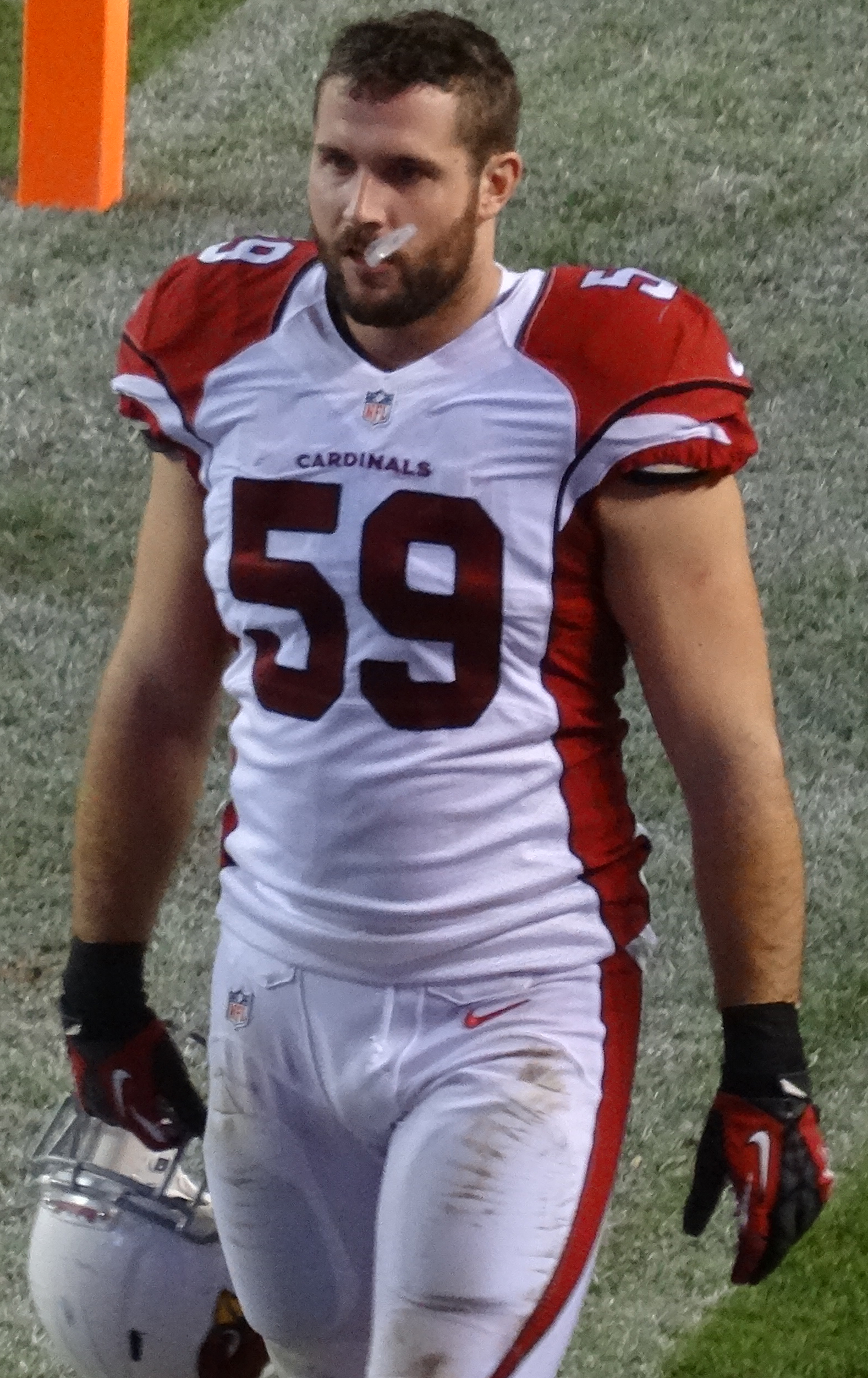
- Nash with the Arizona Cardinals in 2013

No. 59
- Position: Linebacker

Personal information
- Born: September 23, 1989 (age 37); Dixon, California, U.S.
- Listed height: 6 ft 4 in (1.93 m)
- Listed weight: 260 lb (118 kg)

Career information
- High school: Vacaville (Vacaville, California)
- College: Sacramento State
- NFL draft: 2012: undrafted

Career history
- Arizona Cardinals (2012–2013)

Career NFL statistics
- Tackles: 1
- Stats at Pro Football Reference

Zack Nash (born September 23, 1989) is an American former professional football player who was a linebacker for the Arizona Cardinals of the National Football League (NFL). He signed with the Cardinals as an undrafted free agent. He played college football for the Sacramento State Hornets.

== College career ==
He played college football at California State University, Sacramento. After the 2010 season, he was selected to the second team All-America. He was selected to the all-Big Sky Conference first team.

== Professional career ==
On April 30, 2012, he signed with the Arizona Cardinals as an Undrafted free agent. On August 24, 2012, he was released. On October 30, 2012, he was promoted from the practice squad after the team released Fullback Reagan Mauia.
