= Kevin Thomson (gridiron football) =

American football player (born 1995)

No. 9, 13
- Position: Quarterback

Personal information
- Born: September 2, 1995 (age 31); Auburn, Washington, U.S.
- Listed height: 6 ft 1 in (1.85 m)
- Listed weight: 220 lb (100 kg)

Career information
- High school: Auburn Riverside
- College: UNLV (2014–2015); Sacramento State (2016–2019); Washington (2020)
- NFL draft: 2021: undrafted

Career history
- BC Lions (2021–2022); Philadelphia Stars (2023); Hamilton Tiger-Cats (2024)*
- * Offseason or practice squad member only

Awards and highlights
- Big Sky Offensive Player of the Year (2019)

Career CFL statistics
- Games played: 3
- Stats at CFL.ca
- Stats at Pro Football Reference

Kevin Thomson (born September 2, 1995) is an American former professional football quarterback who played in the Canadian Football League (CFL) and United States Football League (USFL). He played college football for the UNLV Rebels, Sacramento State Hornets, and Washington Huskies.

== Early life ==
Thomson was born on September 2, 1995, in Auburn, Washington. He attended Auburn Riverside High School where he played football and baseball.

In Thomson's senior season, he led the football team to a 7–3 record and the league championship, while throwing for 1,656 yards and 15 touchdowns, in addition to 553 rushing yards. He was named the SPSL North Offensive Back of the Year and also earned first-team All-SPSL North honors. He signed a letter of intent to attend University of Nevada, Las Vegas (UNLV) in February 2014.

== College career ==
=== UNLV ===
Thomson redshirted his first year at UNLV in 2014. On September 2, 2015, he had Tommy John Surgery, which caused him to miss the entire 2015 season.

=== Sacramento State ===
Thomson transferred to Sacramento State University in 2016, but sat out his first season there while still recovering from Tommy John Surgery. He gained the starting job in 2017 and threw for 1,828 yards and 17 touchdowns with only three interceptions. In the fourth game of the 2017 season, against Southern Utah, Thomson set a school record by accounting for seven total touchdowns, four rushing and three passing, while being named STATS National Player of the Week.

As a sophomore in 2018, Thomson completed 79-of-145 passes for 1,380 yards and eight touchdowns with only one interception, while playing in seven games. In January 2019, the NCAA granted Thomson a very rare two-year eligibility extension due to his injury history. As a junior in 2019, he started 12 out of 13 games and threw for 3,216 yards and 27 touchdowns, in addition to rushing for 619 yards and 12 scores, placing second all-time in school history for single season yards of offense. He led them to a 9–4 record and their first ever playoff appearance, while being named the Big Sky Conference Offensive Player of the Year and a second-team All-American by Phil Steele.

=== Washington ===
Thomson transferred to the University of Washington in 2020, finishing his stint at Sacramento State with 6,424 passing yards and 52 touchdowns, in addition to 1,247 rushing yards and 21 touchdowns. He competed with Dylan Morris, Ethan Garbers and Jacob Sirman for the starting job before ultimately suffering a season-ending injury. Although given one final year of eligibility due to the COVID-19 pandemic, Thomson decided to try to play professionally rather than play an eighth season of college football.

=== Statistics ===
Year	Team	GP	Passing								Rushing			
Year	Team	GP	Comp	Att	Pct	Yards	Avg	TD	Int	Rate	Att	Yards	Avg	TD
2014	UNLV	Did not play												
2015	UNLV	Did not play												
2016	Sacramento State	Did not play												
2017	Sacramento State	8	97	175	55.4	1,828	10.4	17	3	171.8	79	494	6.3	9
2018	Sacramento State	7	79	145	54.5	1,380	9.5	8	1	151.3	51	134	2.6	0
2019	Sacramento State	12	265	450	58.9	3,216	7.1	27	8	135.2	127	619	4.9	12
2020	Washington	Did not play												
Career		27	441	770	57.3	6,424	8.3	52	12	146.5	257	1,247	4.9	21

== Professional career ==
After going unselected in the 2021 NFL draft, Thomson received a rookie mini-camp invite from the Carolina Panthers, but was not signed.

In October 2021, Thomson was signed by the BC Lions of the Canadian Football League (CFL). He dressed in two games during the 2021 season as the third-string quarterback but recorded no statistics. (Note: Reported by The Province as having dressed in one game, two by Pro Football Archives and the CFL website.) In 2022, Thomson battled Michael O'Connor for the second-string spot. Thomson was said to have impressed the team, but suffered a serious injury in preseason on a controversial hit by Titus Wall. Thomson dressed in only one regular season game during the 2022 season, and was released in September 2022 after the Lions signed Antonio Pipkin to be the new third-string quarterback.

On November 9, 2022, Thomson was signed by the Philadelphia Stars of the United States Football League (USFL). He played in two games for the Stars during the 2023 USFL season, completing one of two passes for 11 yards. The Stars folded in December 2023 when the XFL and USFL merged to create the United Football League (UFL).

On January 30, 2024, it was announced that Thomson had signed with the Hamilton Tiger-Cats. He was released by the team on June 1.

== Coaching ==
Following his playing career, Thompson has transitioned to coaching. He served as the quarterbacks coach for Eastside Catholic School in 2025 before being named head coach at Auburn High School (Washington) for 2026.
