= Auburn Riverside High School =

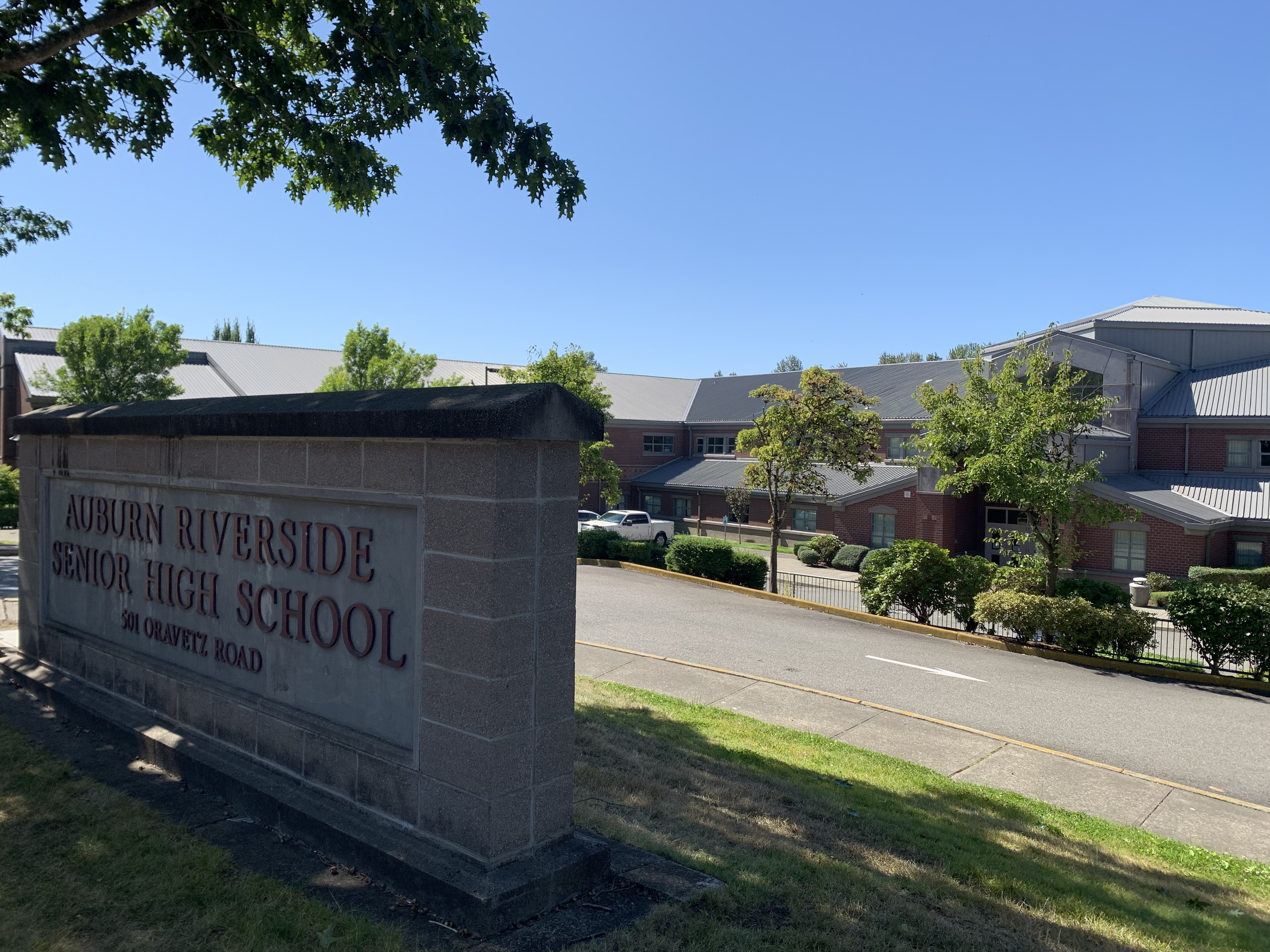

Location
- 501 Oravetz Rd SE; Auburn, Washington 98092; 47°16′03″N 122°13′21″W

Information
- Type: Public secondary
- Established: 1995
- School district: Auburn School District # 408
- Principal: Janalyn McKeehan
- Teaching staff: 88.28 (FTE)
- Enrollment: 1,884 (2023-2024)
- Student to teacher ratio: 21.34
- Colors: Teal, blue, silver and white
- Mascot: Raven
- Newspaper: InFlight
- Yearbook: Haida
- Website: http://www.auburn.wednet.edu/arhs

Auburn Riverside High School is located in Auburn, Washington, United States. Located next to the White River, the school takes its name from its location. The school opened in 1995 due to overcrowding at Auburn Senior High School.

== Athletics ==
Auburn Riverside joined the Olympic Division of the North Puget Sound League in 2016.

== Incidents ==
On Monday, October 16, 2023, a student let six masked individuals through a side door, mistakenly believing they were Auburn Riverside students. The masked intruders proceeded to assault five students while running down the hallway, before promptly escaping when staff confronted them. The school was subsequently put into lockdown for the remainder of the day, and security and police presence was increased for the following two days. More than 500 students were absent the day after the attack, with parents citing safety concerns. The incident was connected to "gang activity", including two fights that had broken out at the school the previous Friday, one of which resulted in a BB gun being confiscated.

== Notable alumni ==
- Ian Crawford - guitarist for Panic! at the Disco
- Chris Eylander - soccer player for Seattle Sounders FC
- David Paulson - former tight end for Pittsburgh Steelers
- Travis Stevens - summer Olympian silver medalist in men's 81 kg judo
- Harrison Maurus - weightlifter who competed in the 2020 Summer Olympics
- Michael Rucker - MLB pitcher
- Kevin Thomson - professional football quarterback
