= John Farley (running back) =

American football player (born 1961)

No. 33
- Position: Running back

Personal information
- Born: August 11, 1961 (age 65); Stockton, California, U.S.
- Listed height: 5 ft 10 in (1.78 m)
- Listed weight: 202 lb (92 kg)

Career information
- High school: Amos Alonzo Stagg (Stockton)
- College: Sacramento State (1980–1983)
- NFL draft: 1984: 4th round, 92nd overall pick

Career history
- Cincinnati Bengals (1984–1985); Green Bay Packers (1986)*; Montreal Alouettes (1987)*
- * Offseason or practice squad member only

Awards and highlights
- Second-team Little All-America (1983); NCAC Offensive Player of the Year (1983); 4× First-team All-NCAC (1980–1983)

Career NFL statistics
- Games played: 13
- Rushing yards: 11
- Receptions: 2
- Receiving yards: 11
- Return yards: 93
- Fumble recoveries: 1
- Stats at Pro Football Reference

John Howard Farley (born August 11, 1961) is an American former professional football running back who played in the National Football League (NFL) with the Cincinnati Bengals and the Green Bay Packers and in the Canadian Football League (CFL) with the Montreal Alouettes. He played college football for the Sacramento State Hornets.

== Early life ==
Farley was born on August 11, 1961, in Stockton, California. He attended Amos Alonzo Stagg High School in Stockton.

== College career ==
Farley played college football for the Sacramento State Hornets from 1980 to 1983. He ended his career as the school leader with 3,862 rushing yards and 30 rushing touchdowns and earned Northern California Athletic Conference Offensive Player of the Year as senior. In 1983, Farley was also named to the second-team Little All-America team by the AP. In all four years, he was named to the first-team all conference team.

== Professional career ==
=== Cincinnati Bengals ===
Farley was selected in the fourth round, with the 92nd overall selection, by the Cincinnati Bengals in the 1984 NFL draft. He officially signed with the team on June 25, 1984 and received a $110,000 signing bonus. Farley played mostly on special teams and returned six kicks for 93 yards, rushed seven times for 11 yards and caught two passes for 11 yards in 13 games.

He suffered a knee injury during the preseason and was placed on the injured list on August 27, 1985. On October 23, he was placed on waivers.

=== Green Bay Packers ===
On March 10, 1986, Farley signed with the Green Bay Packers. He was released on August 11.

=== Montreal Alouettes ===
On May 23, 1987, the Montreal Alouettes signed Farley. He was released on June 1.
