= Mike Carter (American football) =

American football player (born 1948)

No. 36, 83
- Position: Wide receiver

Personal information
- Born: February 18, 1948 (age 78); Little Rock, Arkansas, U.S.
- Listed height: 6 ft 1 in (1.85 m)
- Listed weight: 210 lb (95 kg)

Career information
- High school: Lowell (California)
- College: Sacramento State
- NFL draft: 1970: 15th round, 380th overall pick

Career history
- Green Bay Packers (1970); Kansas City Chiefs (1972)

Career NFL statistics
- Games played: 7
- Receiving yards: 24
- Rushing yards: 25
- Stats at Pro Football Reference

Michael Norman Carter (born February 18, 1948) is a former wide receiver in the National Football League (NFL).

== Biography ==
Carter was born Michael Norman Carter on February 18, 1948, in Little Rock, Arkansas.

== Career ==
Carter was drafted by the Green Bay Packers in the fifteenth round of the 1970 NFL draft. He played that season and the 1971 season with the team. He was traded in 1973 and played with the San Diego Chargers during the 1973 NFL season. He went on to play with the "Philadelphia Bell", in the World Football League, before retiring in 1976.

He was an "NCAA - ALL American" in 1969; selected to the College "Hall of Fame" and Sacramento Metropolitan Chamber of Commerce "Hall Of Fame" while attending California State University, Sacramento. California State University, Sacramento.
