= Elijah Tau-Tolliver =

American football player (born 2003)

Profile
- Position: Running back

Personal information
- Born: May 16, 2003 (age 23); Sparks, Nevada, U.S.
- Listed height: 6 ft 0 in (1.83 m)
- Listed weight: 204 lb (93 kg)

Career information
- High school: Edward C. Reed (Sparks, Nevada)
- College: Sacramento State (2021–2024); Michigan State (2025)
- NFL draft: 2026: undrafted

Career history
- Baltimore Ravens (2026)*
- * Offseason or practice squad member only

Elijah Tau-Tolliver (born May 16, 2003) is an American professional football running back. He played college football for the Michigan State Spartans and Sacramento State Hornets.

== Early life ==
Tau-Tolliver attended Edward C. Reed High School in Sparks, Nevada, and committed to play college football for the Sacramento State Hornets.

== College career ==
=== Sacramento State ===
During his four-year career at Sacramento State from 2021 to 2024, Tau-Tolliver ran for 1,538 yards and 14 touchdowns on 275 carries and hauled in 48 passes for 389 yards and two touchdowns. He also added a kickoff return touchdown. After the 2024 season, he entered the NCAA transfer portal.

=== Michigan State ===
Tau-Tolliver transferred to play for the Michigan State Spartans. In week 11 of the 2025 season, he ran for 127 yards in a loss to Minnesota. Tau-Tolliver finished the 2025 season with 428 rushing yards and two touchdowns on 72 carries, while also hauling in 18 passes for 139 yards.

== Professional career ==
Pre-draft measurables
Height	Weight	Arm length	Hand span	Wingspan	40-yard dash	10-yard split	20-yard split	20-yard shuttle	Three-cone drill	Vertical jump	Broad jump	Bench press
6 ft 0 1/8 in (1.83 m)	204 lb (93 kg)	31 1/2 in (0.80 m)	9 7/8 in (0.25 m)	6 ft 2 3/8 in (1.89 m)	4.60 s	1.56 s	2.71 s	4.65 s	7.42 s	32.5 in (0.83 m)	9 ft 9 in (2.97 m)	15 reps
All values from Pro Day

After not being selected in the 2026 NFL draft, Tau-Tolliver signed with the Baltimore Ravens as an undrafted free agent. On August 30, Tau-Tolliver was waived by the Ravens as a part of final roster cuts.
