= Bobby Fresques =

American football player and coach (born 1970)

Sacramento State Hornets
- Title: Quarterbacks coach & passing game coordinator

Personal information
- Born: October 2, 1970 (age 56)
- Listed height: 6 ft 1 in (1.85 m)
- Listed weight: 190 lb (86 kg)

Career information
- High school: Damien (La Verne, California)
- College: Wyoming (1988–1989); Sacramento State (1990–1992)

Career history

Playing
- Munich Cowboys (1994); San Jose SaberCats (1996)

Coaching
- Sacramento City (1996) Assistant; Sacramento State (1997) Wide receivers coach; California (1998) Offensive assistant; Christian Brothers HS (CA) (1999–2004) Head coach; Folsom HS (CA) (2010–2018) Quarterbacks coach; Sacramento State (2019–2022) Quarterbacks coach; Sacramento State (2023) Offensive coordinator & quarterbacks coach; Sacramento State (2024) Associate head coach, offensive coordinator, & quarterbacks coach; Sacramento State (2025) Lead analyst & director of alumni relations; Sacramento State (2026–present) Quarterbacks coach & passing game coordinator

Career AFL statistics
- Comp. / Att.: 49 / 92
- Passing yards: 468
- TD–INT: 4–6
- QB rating: 51.36
- Stats at ArenaFan.com

Bobby Fresques (born October 2, 1970) is an American college football coach and former quarterback. He currently serves as the quarterbacks coach and passing game coordinator for the Sacramento State Hornets. He played college football for the Wyoming Cowboys and Sacramento State, and played professionally for the San Jose SaberCats of the Arena Football League (AFL).

== Playing career ==
Bobby Fresques was born on October 2, 1970. He played high school football at Damien High School in Laverne, California.

Fresques first played college football for the Wyoming Cowboys of the University of Wyoming from 1988 to 1989. He completed 25 of 42 passes (59.5%) for 301 yards and two touchdowns in 1988 while also catching one pass for seven yards. In 1989, he recorded 22 completions on 48 attempts (45.8%) for 303 yards and one interception. Fresques then transferred to California State University, Sacramento, where he was a member of the Sacramento State Hornets from 1990 to 1992. He threw for 462 yards and four touchdowns in 1990, 1,280 yards and eight touchdowns in 1991, and 2,015 yards and 15 touchdowns in 1992. His 27 career touchdown passes were the second most in school history and his 3,757 career passing yards were the fourth most in school history. Fresques graduated from Sacramento State with a bachelor's degree in communication studies in 1992.

Fresques played for the Munich Cowboys of American Football Bundesliga in 1994. He played in eight games for the San Jose SaberCats of the Arena Football League in 1996, completing 49 of 92 passes (53.3%) for 468 yards, four touchdowns, and six interceptions.

== Coaching career ==
Fresques began his coaching career in 1996 as an assistant at Sacramento City College.

In 1997, Fresques was hired as the wide receivers coach for Sacramento State.

In 1998, Fresques was hired as an offensive assistant for California.

In 1999, Fresques became the head football coach for Christian Brothers High School. He held the position until 2004.

In 2010, Fresques was hired as the quarterbacks coach for Folsom High School.

In 2019, Fresques was hired as the quarterbacks coach for Sacramento State. In 2023, he was promoted to offensive coordinator while retaining his position as quarterbacks coach. In 2024, Fresques was promoted to associate head coach while retaining his positions as offensive coordinator and quarterbacks coach. In 2025, he was demoted to lead analyst and director of alumni relations.

On December 30, 2025, following the hiring of Alonzo Carter, Fresques was named as the Hornets' quarterbacks coach and passing game coordinator.

== Personal life ==
In 2006, Fresques graduated from National University with a single subject teaching credential.
