= Carson Conklin =

American football player (born 2004)

No. 17 – Sacramento State Hornets
- Position: Quarterback
- Class: Redshirt Junior

Personal information
- Born: February 14, 2004 (age 22)
- Listed height: 6 ft 1 in (1.85 m)
- Listed weight: 190 lb (86 kg)

Career information
- High school: Centennial (Corona, California)
- College: Sacramento State (2023–2024); Fresno State (2025); Sacramento State (2026–present)
- Stats at ESPN

Carson Conklin (born February 14, 2004) is an American football quarterback for the Sacramento State Hornets. He previously played for the Fresno State Bulldogs.

== Early life ==
Conklin attended Lutheran High School of Orange County in Orange, California for his freshman season before transferring to Centennial High School in Corona, California. He committed to play college football for the Sacramento State Hornets.

== College career ==
=== Sacramento State (first stint) ===
As a freshman in 2023, Conklin threw for 744 yards and six touchdowns. In week 3 of the 2024 season, he took over as the team's starter after an injury to Kaiden Bennett and threw for 264 yards and two touchdowns in a win over Nicholls. Conklin appeared in 12 games on the season, throwing for 2,876 yards and 28 touchdowns. After the season, he entered the NCAA transfer portal.

=== Fresno State ===
Conklin transferred to play for the Fresno State Bulldogs. In week 10 of the 2025 season, he made his first start for the Bulldogs, throwing for 182 yards and two interceptions in a loss to San Diego State. In week 11, Conklin won his first game for the team over Boise State, after throwing for 35 yards. He completed 47 of 96 passes for 354 yards and a touchdown in three starts that season, after which he once again entered the NCAA transfer portal.

=== Sacramento State (second stint) ===
Conklin transferred to play once again for the Sacramento State Hornets, which transitioned from the FCS to the FBS in the Mid-American Conference.
