= 2025 USC Trojans football team =

American college football season

2025 USC Trojans football

Alamo Bowl, L 27–30 ^{OT} vs. TCU
- Conference: Big Ten Conference

Ranking
- Coaches: No. 21
- AP: No. 20
- Record: 9–4 (7–2 Big Ten)
- Head coach: Lincoln Riley (4th season)
- Offensive coordinator: Luke Huard (1st season)
- Offensive scheme: Power raid
- Defensive coordinator: D'Anton Lynn (2nd season)
- Co-defensive coordinator: Eric Henderson (2nd season)
- Base defense: 4–3
- Home stadium: Los Angeles Memorial Coliseum

Uniform

2025 Big Ten Conference football standings
	Conf.			Overall
Team	W		L	W		L
No. 1 Indiana y$#^	9	–	0	16	–	0
No. 5 Ohio State y^	9	–	0	12	–	2
No. 4 Oregon ^	8	–	1	13	–	2
No. 21 Michigan	7	–	2	9	–	4
No. 20 USC	7	–	2	9	–	4
No. 17 Iowa	6	–	3	9	–	4
Illinois	5	–	4	9	–	4
Washington	5	–	4	9	–	4
Minnesota	5	–	4	8	–	5
Nebraska	4	–	5	7	–	6
Northwestern	4	–	5	7	–	6
Penn State	3	–	6	7	–	6
UCLA	3	–	6	3	–	9
Rutgers	2	–	7	5	–	7
Wisconsin	2	–	7	4	–	8
Maryland	1	–	8	4	–	8
Michigan State	1	–	8	4	–	8
Purdue	0	–	9	2	–	10
Championship: Indiana 13, Ohio State 10
# – College Football Playoff champion; ^ – College Football Playoff participant; $ – Conference champion; y – Championship game participant; As of November 12, 2026; Rankings from AP Poll

The 2025 USC Trojans football team represented the University of Southern California (USC) as a second-year member of the Big Ten Conference during the 2025 NCAA Division I FBS football season. The team was led by their fourth-year head coach Lincoln Riley, and played their home games at Los Angeles Memorial Coliseum located in Los Angeles.

== Schedule ==
Date	Time	Opponent	Rank	Site	TV	Result	Attendance
August 30	4:30 p.m.	Missouri State*		Los Angeles Memorial Coliseum; Los Angeles, CA	BTN	W 73–13	62,841
September 6	4:30 p.m.	Georgia Southern*		Los Angeles Memorial Coliseum; Los Angeles, CA	FS1	W 59–20	66,514
September 13	12:30 p.m. (Note: The game was initially scheduled for 12:30 p.m., but was postponed until 3:45 p.m. due to thunderstorms.)	at Purdue		Ross–Ade Stadium; West Lafayette, IN	CBS	W 33–17	58,065
September 20	8:00 p.m.	Michigan State	No. 25	Los Angeles Memorial Coliseum; Los Angeles, CA	FOX	W 45–31	67,614
September 27	9:00 a.m.	at No. 23 Illinois	No. 21	Gies Memorial Stadium; Champaign, IL (Big Noon Kickoff)	FOX	L 32–34	60,670
October 11	4:30 p.m.	No. 15 Michigan		Los Angeles Memorial Coliseum; Los Angeles, CA	NBC	W 31–13	75,500
October 18	4:30 p.m.	at No. 13 Notre Dame*	No. 20	Notre Dame Stadium; Notre Dame, IN (rivalry)	NBC	L 24–34	77,622
November 1	4:30 p.m.	at Nebraska	No. 23	Memorial Stadium; Lincoln, NE	NBC	W 21–17	86,529
November 7	6:00 p.m.	Northwestern	No. 19	Los Angeles Memorial Coliseum; Los Angeles, CA	FOX	W 38–17	67,179
November 15	12:30 p.m.	No. 21 Iowa^{†}	No. 17	Los Angeles Memorial Coliseum; Los Angeles, CA	BTN	W 26–21	65,216
November 22	12:30 p.m.	at No. 7 Oregon	No. 15	Autzen Stadium; Eugene, OR (College GameDay)	CBS	L 27–42	59,588
November 29	4:30 p.m.	UCLA	No. 17	Los Angeles Memorial Coliseum; Los Angeles, CA (Victory Bell)	NBC	W 29–10	69,614
December 30	6:00 p.m.	vs. TCU*	No. 16	Alamodome; San Antonio, TX (Alamo Bowl)	ESPN	L 27–30 ^{OT}	54,751
*Non-conference game; ^{†}Homecoming; Rankings from AP Poll (and CFP Rankings, after November 4) - Released prior to game; All times are in Pacific time; Source:

== Rankings ==
Ranking movements Legend: ██ Increase in ranking ██ Decrease in ranking RV = Received votes
	Week																
Poll	Pre	1	2	3	4	5	6	7	8	9	10	11	12	13	14	15	Final
AP	RV	RV	RV	25	21	RV	RV	20	RV	23	20	17	16	19	17	16	20
Coaches	RV	RV	RV	RV	22	RV	RV	21	RV	RV	21	18	16	20	17	16	21
CFP	Not released										19	17	15	17	16	16	Not released

== Game summaries ==
=== Missouri State ===
Missouri State Bears (0–0) at USC Trojans (0–0) – Game summary

Quarter	1	2	3	4	Total
Bears	3	7	3	0	13
Trojans	14	28	14	17	73

at Los Angeles Memorial Coliseum • Los Angeles, California

- Date: August 30
- Game time: 4:30 p.m.
- Game weather: Sunny • Temperature: 89 °F (32 °C) • Wind: SW at 9 miles per hour (14 km/h)
- Game attendance: 62,841
- Referee: Francisco Villar
- TV announcers (BTN): Guy Haberman (play-by-play), Yogi Roth (analyst), and Rhett Lewis (sideline reporter)

Game information

First quarter

- (10:12) MOST - Yousef Obeid 44-yard field goal (Drive: 9 plays, 48 yards, 4:48; Missouri State 3-0)
- (6:58) USC - Waymond Jordan 5-yard run (Ryon Sayeri kick), (Drive: 7 plays, 75 yards, 3:08; USC 7-3)
- (0:28) USC - Bryan Jackson 3-yard run (Ryon Sayeri kick), (Drive: 10 plays, 75 yards, 4:50; USC 14-3)

Second quarter

- (13:21) USC - Lake McRee 64-yard pass from Jayden Maiava (Ryon Sayrei kick), (Drive: 1 play, 64 yards, 0:09; USC 21-3)
- (12:00) USC - Bishop Fitzgerald 39-yard interception return (Ryon Satrei kick); (USC 28-3)
- (7:58) MOST - Tristian Gardner 33-yard pass from Jacob Clark (Yousef Obeid kick), (Drive: 7 plays, 65 yards, 4:02; USC 28-10)
- (3:35) USC - Jayden Maiava 3-yard run (Ryon Sayeri kick) (Drive: 8 plays, 76 yards, 4:17; USC 35-10)
- (0:25) USC - Eli Sanders 73-yard pass from Jayden Maiava (Ryon Sayeri kick), (Drive: 5 plays, 97 yards, 1:10; USC 42-10)

Third quarter

- (10:26) USC – Husan Longstreet 5-yard run, (Ryon Sayeri kick), (Drive: 8 plays, 74 yards, 4:34; USC 49–10)
- (7:50) MOST – Yousef Obeid 46-yard field goal (Drive: 4 plays - 7 yards, 2:08; USC 49–13)
- (5:30) USC – King Miller 75-yard run (Ryon Sayeri kick), (Drive: 1 play, 75 yards, 0:12; USC 56–13)

Fourth quarter

- (13:30) USC – Husan Longstreet 17-yard run (Ryan Sayeri kick), (Drive: 4 plays, 38 yards, 2:28; USC 63–13)
- (10:51) USC – Ryan Sayeri 32-yard field goal (Drive: 5 plays, 7 yards, 2:21; USC 66–13)
- (4:46) USC – Carson Tabracci 9-yard pass from Husan Longstreet (William Weisberg kick), (Drive: 7 plays, 52 yards, 3:48; USC 73–13)

Statistics	MOST	USC
First downs	11	27
Plays–yards	57–224	57–597
Rushes–yards	29–65	30–233
Passing yards	159	364
Passing: comp–att–int	20–28–2	24–27–0
Turnovers	3	1
Time of possession	32:31	27:29

Team	Category	Player	Statistics
Missouri State	Passing	Jacob Clark	16/24, 147 yards, TD, 2 INT
Missouri State	Rushing	Shomari Lawrence	12 carries, 50 yards
Missouri State	Receiving	Tristian Gardner	2 receptions, 39 yards, TD
USC	Passing	Jayden Maiava	15/18, 295 yards, 2 TD
USC	Rushing	King Miller	4 carries, 80 yards, TD
USC	Receiving	Makai Lemon	7 receptions, 90 yards

=== Georgia Southern ===
Georgia Southern Eagles (0–1) at USC Trojans (1–0) – Game summary

Quarter	1	2	3	4	Total
Eagles	6	7	7	0	20
Trojans	21	10	14	14	59

at Los Angeles Memorial Coliseum • Los Angeles, California

- Date: September 6
- Game time: 4:30 p.m.
- Game weather: Sunny • Temperature: 83 °F (28 °C) • Wind: W at 8 miles per hour (13 km/h)
- Game attendance: 66,514
- Referee: Jason Nickleby
- TV announcers (FS1): Connor Onion (play-by-play) and Mark Helfrich (analyst)

Game information

First quarter

- (13:42) GASO – Camden Brown 32-yard pass from Weston Bryan (Drive: 3 plays, 41 yards, 0:41; GASO 6–0)
- (13:01) USC – Ja'Kobi Lane 12-yard pass from Jayden Maiava, Ryon Sayeri kick (Drive: 8 plays, 75 yards, 4:11; USC 7–6)
- (7:41) USC – Makai Lemon 62-yard pass from Jayden Maiava, Ryon Sayeri kick (Drive: 2 plays, 800 yards, 0:48; USC 14–6)
- (3:17) USC – Makai Lemon 74-yard pass from Jayden Maiava, Ryan Sayeri kick (Drive: 3 plays, 85 yards, 1:03; USC 21–6)

Second quarter

- (11:32) GASO – Camden Brown 24-yard pass from JC French IV, Tripp Bryant kick (Drive: 7 plays, 75 yards, 3:19; USC 21–13)
- (8:52) USC – Ryon Sayeri 26-yard field goal (Drive: 7 plays, 66 yards, 2:34; USC 24–13)
- (5:26) USC – Walker Lyons 14-yard pass from Jayden Maiava, Ryon Sayeri kick (Drive: 4 plays, 77 yards, 1:55; USC 31–13)

Third quarter

- (10:49) USC – Waymond Jones 36-yard run, Ryon Sayeri kick (Drive: 6 plays, 71 yards, 2:23; USC 38–13)
- (7:58) USC – Eli Sanders 1-yard run, Ryon Sayeri kick (Drive: 4 plays, 72 yards, 1:57; USC 45-13)
- (1:34) GASO – Dalen Cobb 13-yard pass from JC French IV, Tripp Bryant kick (Drive: 15 plays, 71 yards, 6:18; USC 45–20)

Fourth quarter

- (12:55) USC – Eli Sanders 5-yard run, Ryon Sayeri kick (Drive: 7 plays, 79 yards, 3:34; USC 52–20)
- (10:24) USC – King Miller 41-yard run, Ryon Sayeri kick (Drive: 3 plays, 64 yards, 1:40; USC 59–20)

Statistics	GASO	USC
First downs	26	28
Plays–yards	78–377	63–755
Rushes–yards	33–142	33–309
Passing yards	235	446
Passing: comp–att–int	24–45–1	20–30–0
Turnovers	1	1
Time of possession	29:48	30:12

Team	Category	Player	Statistics
Georgia Southern	Passing	JC French	19/35, 179 yards, 2 TD, INT
Georgia Southern	Rushing	Jamarian Samuel	4 carries, 58 yards
Georgia Southern	Receiving	Camden Brown	3 receptions, 75 yards, 2 TD
USC	Passing	Jayden Maiava	16/24, 412 yards, 4 TD
USC	Rushing	Waymond Jordan	16 carries, 167 yards, TD
USC	Receiving	Makai Lemon	4 receptions, 158 yards, 2 TD

=== At Purdue ===
USC Trojans (2–0) at Purdue Boilermakers (2–0) – Game summary

Quarter	1	2	3	4	Total
Trojans	3	14	13	3	33
Boilermakers	0	3	7	7	17

at Ross–Ade Stadium • West Lafayette, Indiana

- Date: September 13
- Game time: 12:30 p.m. (Note: The game was initially scheduled for 12:30 p.m., but was postponed until 3:45 p.m. due to thunderstorms.)
- Game weather: Cloudy • Temperature: 70 °F (21 °C) • Wind: SE at 5 miles per hour (8.0 km/h)
- Game attendance: 56,065
- Referee: Tim O'Day
- TV announcers (CBS): Brad Nessler (play-by-play), Gary Danielson (analyst), and Jenny Dell (sideline reporter)

Game information

First quarter

- (7:39) USC – Ryon Sayeri 24-yard field goal (Drive: 8 plays, 84 yards, 4:00; USC 3–0)

Second quarter

- (14:54) USC – Jayden Maiava 3-yard run, Ryon Sayeri kick (Drive: 10 plays, 80 yards, 4:02; USC 10–0)
- (10:49) PUR – Spencer Porath 39-yard field goal (Drive: 10 plays, 56 yards, 4:01; USC 10–3)
- (3:18) USC – Waymond Jordan 6-yard run, Ryon Sayeri kick (Drive: 13 plays, 75 yards, 7:31; USC 17–3)

Third quarter

- (12:15) USC – Ryon Sayeri 37-yard field goal (Drive: 8 plays, 65 yards, 2:40; USC 20–3)
- (8:47) PUR – Ryan Browne 8-yard fumble recovery, Spencer Porath kick (Drive: 8 plays, 67 yards, 3:22; USC 20–10)
- (5:01) USC – Ryon Sayeri 48-yard field goal (Drive: 9 plays, 44 yards, 3:46; USC 23–10)
- (2:15) USC – Jamall Jarrett 70-yard interception return, Ryon Sayeri kick (Drive: 7 plays, 55 yards, 2:46; USC 30–10)

Fourth quarter

- (14:17) PUR – Nitro Tuggle 9-yard pass from Ryan Browne, Spencer Porath kick (Drive: 8 plays, 63 yards, 2:51; USC 30–17)
- (1:10) USC – Ryon Sayeri 19-yard field goal (Drive: 8 plays, 63 yards, 4:27; USC 33–17)

Statistics	USC	PUR
First downs	22	23
Plays–yards	68–460	67–365
Rushes–yards	40–178	28–60
Passing yards	282	305
Passing: comp–att–int	17–28–0	24–39–1
Turnovers	0	3
Time of possession	34:07	25:53

Team	Category	Player	Statistics
USC	Passing	Jayden Maiava	17/28, 282 yards
USC	Rushing	Waymond Jordan	18 carries, 77 yards, TD
USC	Receiving	Ja'Kobi Lane	3 receptions, 115 yards
Purdue	Passing	Ryan Browne	24/39, 305 yards, TD, 3 INT
Purdue	Rushing	Devin Mockobee	12 carries, 45 yards
Purdue	Receiving	EJ Horton Jr.	5 receptions, 70 yards

=== Michigan State ===
Michigan State Spartans (3–0) at No. 25 USC Trojans (3–0) – Game summary

Quarter	1	2	3	4	Total
Spartans	7	3	14	7	31
No. 25 Trojans	10	14	7	14	45

at Los Angeles Memorial Coliseum • Los Angeles, California

- Date: September 20
- Game time: 8:00 p.m.
- Game weather: Clear • Temperature: 70 °F (21 °C) • Wind: W at 3 miles per hour (4.8 km/h)
- Game attendance: 67,614
- Referee: Ron Sondgrass
- TV announcers (FOX): Jason Benetti (play-by-play), Robert Griffin III (analyst), and Alexa Landestoy (sideline reporter)

Game information

First quarter

- (9:03) USC - Ryon Sayeri 25-yard field goal (Drive: 12 plays, 73 yards, 5:52; USC 3-0)
- (5:27) Michigan State - Chrishon McCray 42-yard pass from Aidan Chiles (Martin Connington kick), (Drive: 6 plays, 75 yards, 3:36; Michigan State 7-3)
- (2:38) USC - Jayden Maiava 15-yard run (Ryon Sayeri kick), (Drive: 6 plays, 75 yards, 2:42; USC 10-7)

Second quarter

- (11:36) USC - Makai Lemon 40-yard pass from Jayden Maiava (Ryon Sayeri kick), (Drive: 5 plays, 93 yards, 2:00; USC 17-7)
- (4:26) Michigan State - Martin Connington 29-yard field goal (Drive: 8 plays, 44 yards, 3:39; USC 17-10)
- (0:37) USC - Tanook Hines 7-yard pass from Jayden Maiava (Ryon Sayeri kick), (Drive: 11 plays, 88 yards, 3:41; USC 24-10)

Third quarter

- (11:22) USC - Walker Lyons 10-yard pass from Jayden Maiava (Ryon Sayeri kick), (Drive: 4 plays, 57 yards, 1:49: USC 31-10)
- (5:58) Michigan State - Aidan Chiles 4-yard run (Martin Connington kick), (Drive: 11 plays, 87 yards, 5:24; USC 31-17)
- (0:40) Michigan State - Jack Velling 1-yard pass from Aidan Chiles (Martin Commington kick), (Drive: 8 plays, 32 yards, 5:10; USC 31-24)

Fourth quarter

- (8:20) USC - Makai Lemon 4-yard run (Ryon Sayeri kick), (Drive: 13 plays, 75 yards, 7:20; USC 38-24)
- (2:57) USC - Jayden Maiava 1-yard run (Ryon Sayeri kick), (Drive: 7 plays, 28 yards, 3:33; USC 45-24)
- (2:39) Michigan State - Omari Kelly 75-yard pass from Aidan Chiles (Martin Connington kick), (Drive: 2 plays, 75 yards, 0:18; USC 45-31)

Statistics	MSU	USC
First downs	20	27
Plays–yards	55–337	66–523
Rushes–yards	32–112	40–289
Passing yards	225	234
Passing: comp–att–int	13–23–0	20–26–0
Turnovers	0	1
Time of possession	28:54	31:06

Team	Category	Player	Statistics
Michigan State	Passing	Aidan Chiles	12/21, 212 yards, 3 TD
Michigan State	Rushing	Makhi Frazier	14 carries, 61 yards
Michigan State	Receiving	Omari Kelly	6 receptions, 133 yards, TD
USC	Passing	Jayden Maiava	20/26, 234 yards, 3 TD
USC	Rushing	Waymond Jordan	18 carries, 157 yards
USC	Receiving	Makai Lemon	8 receptions, 127 yards, TD

=== At No. 23 Illinois ===
No. 21 USC Trojans (4–0) at No. 23 Illinois Fighting Illini (3–1) – Game summary

Quarter	1	2	3	4	Total
No. 21 Trojans	7	3	7	15	32
No. 23 Fighting Illini	7	7	10	10	34

at Gies Memorial Stadium • Champaign, Illinois

- Date: September 27
- Game time: 9:00 a.m.
- Game weather: Sunny • Temperature: 84 °F (29 °C) • Wind: W at 4 miles per hour (6.4 km/h)
- Game attendance: 60,670
- Referee: Kole Knueppel
- TV announcers (FOX): Gus Johnson (play-by-play), Joel Klatt (analyst), and Jenny Taft (sideliine reporter)

Game information

First quarter

- (5:49) ILL – Luke Altmyer 2-yard run, David Olano kick (Drive: 10 plays, 70 yards, 5:00; Illinois 7-0)
- (1:22) USC – Waymond Jordan 1-yard run, Ryon Sayeri kick (Drive: 9 plays, 75 yards, 4:27; 7-7)

Second quarter

- (10:49) ILL – Luke Altmyer 3-yard pass from Hank Beatty, David Olano kick (Drive: 11 plays, 75 yards, 5:33; Illinois 14-7)
- (0:02) USC – Ryon Sayeri 21-yard field goal (Drive: 7 plays, 70 yards, 0:47; Illinois 14-10)

Third quarter

- (11:34) ILL – David Olano 45-yard field goal (Drive: 8 plays, 49 yards, 3:26; Illinois 17-10)
- (6:59) ILL – Kaden Feagin 64-yard pass from Luke Altmyer, David Olano kick (Drive: 2 plays, 66 yards, 0:45; Illinois 24-10)
- (1:46) USC – Waymond Jordan 2-yard run, Ryon Sayeri kick (Drive: 11 plays, 81 yards, 5:08; Illinois 24-17)

Fourth quarter

- (14:34) ILL – Justin Bowick 25-yard pass from Luke Altmyer, David Olano kick (Drive: 5 plays, 75 yards, 2:12; Illinois 31-17)
- (9:54) USC – Makai Lemon 19-yard pass from Jayden Maiava, Jayden Maiava pass to Makai Lemon for two-point conversion (Drive: 11 plays, 75 yards, 4:40; Illinois 31-25)
- (1:55) USC – Makai Lemon 16-yard pass from Jayden Maiava, Ryon Sayeri kick (Drive: 9 plays, 80 yards, 4:26; USC 32-31)
- (0:00) ILL – David Olano 41-yard field goal (Drive: 8 plays, 51 yards, 1:55; Illinois 34-32)

Statistics	USC	ILL
First downs	29	25
Plays–yards	77–490	62–502
Rushes–yards	34–126	35–171
Passing yards	364	331
Passing: comp–att–int	30–43–1	21–27–0
Turnovers	2	2
Time of possession	32:34	27:26

Team	Category	Player	Statistics
USC	Passing	Jayden Maiava	30/43, 364 yards, 2 TD, INT
USC	Rushing	Waymond Jordan	20 carries, 94 yards, 2 TD
USC	Receiving	Makai Lemon	11 receptions, 151 yards, 2 TD
Illinois	Passing	Luke Altmyer	20/26, 328 yards, 2 TD
Illinois	Rushing	Kaden Feagin	14 carries, 60 yards
Illinois	Receiving	Collin Dixon	4 receptions, 90 yards

=== No. 15 Michigan ===
No. 15 Michigan Wolverines (4–1) at USC Trojans (4–1) – Game summary

Quarter	1	2	3	4	Total
No. 15 Wolverines	0	7	0	6	13
Trojans	7	7	7	10	31

at Los Angeles Memorial Coliseum • Los Angeles, California

- Date: October 11
- Game time: 4:30 p.m.
- Game weather: Sunny • Temperature: 76 °F (24 °C) • Wind: SW at 9 miles per hour (14 km/h)
- Game attendance: 75,500
- Referee: Francisco Villar
- TV announcers (NBC): Noah Eagle (play-by-play), Todd Blackledge (analyst), and Kathryn Tappen (sideline reporter)

Game information

First quarter

- (8:57) USC - Ja'Kobi Lane 2-yard pass from Jayden Maiava (Ryon Sayeri kick), (Drive: 11 plays, 75 yards, 5:58; USC 7-0)

Second quarter

- (3:09) Michigan - Donaven McCulley 8-yard pass from Bryce Underwood (Dominic Zvada kick) (Drive: 14 plays, 86 yards, 6:03; Tied 7-7)
- (0:14) USC - Makai Lemon 12-yard pass from Jayden Maiava (Ryon Sayeri kick) (Drive: 9 plays, 75 yards, 2:50; USC 14-7)

Third quarter

- (10:45) USC - King Miller 15-yard rush (Ryon Sayeri kick) (Drive: 5 plays, 52 yards, 1:49; USC 21-7)

Fourth quarter

- (10:01) USC - Ryon Sayeri 54-yard field goal (Drive: 10 plays, 41 yards, 5:36; USC 24-7)
- (9:17) Michigan - Andrew Marsh 69-yard pass from Bryce Underwood (Two-point conversion pass from Bryce Underwood to Donaven McCulley is no good), (Drive: 2 plays, 75 yards, 0:44; USC 24-13)
- (4:21) USC - Bryan Jackson 29-yard rush (Ryon Sayeri kick), (Drive: 9 plays, 75 yards, 4:56; USC 31-13)

Statistics	MICH	USC
First downs	17	24
Plays–yards	57–316	68–489
Rushes–yards	31–109	36–224
Passing yards	207	265
Passing: comp–att–int	15–26–2	25–32–1
Turnovers	2	2
Time of possession	26:38	33:22

Team	Category	Player	Statistics
Michigan	Passing	Bryce Underwood	15/24, 207 yards, TD, 2 INT
Michigan	Rushing	Jordan Marshall	14 carries, 68 yards
Michigan	Receiving	Andrew Marsh	8 receptions, 138 yards, TD
USC	Passing	Jayden Maiava	25/32, 207 yards, 2 TD, INT
USC	Rushing	King Miller	18 carries, 158 yards, TD
USC	Receiving	Makai Lemon	9 receptions, 93 yards, TD

=== at No. 13 Notre Dame (rivalry) ===
No. 20 USC Trojans (5–1) at No. 13 Notre Dame Fighting Irish (4–2) – Game summary

Quarter	1	2	3	4	Total
No. 20 Trojans	10	3	11	0	24
No. 13 Fighting Irish	7	7	13	7	34

at Notre Dame Stadium • Notre Dame, Indiana

- Date: October 18
- Game time: 4:30 p.m.
- Game weather: Cloudy • Temperature: 67 °F (19 °C) • Wind: SW at 5 miles per hour (8.0 km/h)
- Game attendance: 77,622
- Referee: Jerry Magallanes
- TV announcers (NBC): Noah Eagle (play-by-play), Todd Blackledge (analyst), and Kathryn Tappen (sideline reporter)

Game information

First quarter

- (11:09) USC – Lake McRee 10-yard pass from Jayden Maiava, Ryon Sayeri kick (Drive: 10 plays, 75 yards, 3:51, USC 7–0)
- (10:11) ND – Jeremiyah Love 12-yard run, Noah Burnette kick (Drive: 4 plays, 75 yards, 0:58, Tied 7–7)
- (8:04) USC – Ryon Sayeri 42-yard field goal (Drive: 7 plays, 50 yards, 2:07, USC 10–7)

Second quarter

- (14:36) ND – Jadarian Price 16-yard run, Noah Burnette kick (Drive: 4 plays, 63 yards, 1:36, Notre Dame 14–10)
- (1:42) USC – Ryon Sayeri 24-yard field goal (Drive: 9 plays, 71 yards, 4:09, Notre Dame 14–13)

Third quarter

- (8:04) ND – Will Pauling 6-yard pass from CJ Carr, Noah Burnette kick (Drive: 13 plays, 75 yards, 6:56, Notre Dame 21–13)
- (6:19) USC – Ryon Sayeri 43-yard field goal (Drive: 5 plays, 39 yards, 1:45, Notre Dame 21–16)
- (4:32) USC – Ja'Kobi Lane 59-yard pass from Jayden Maiava, Ja'Kobi Lane pass from Jayden Maiava (Drive: 3 plays, 71 yards, 0:53, USC 24–21)
- (4:17) ND – Jadarian Price 100-yard kickoff return, Noah Burnette kick missed (Notre Dame 27–24)

Fourth quarter

- (7:16) ND – CJ Carr 1-yard run, Noah Burnette kick (Drive: 7 plays, 50 yards, 3:55, Notre Dame 34–24)

Statistics	USC	ND
First downs	24	23
Plays–yards	71–396	70–442
Rushes–yards	29–68	44–306
Passing yards	328	136
Passing: comp–att–int	22–42–2	16–26–1
Turnovers	3	1
Time of possession	27:21	32:39

Team	Category	Player	Statistics
USC	Passing	Jayden Maiava	22/42, 328 yards, 2 TD, 2 INT
USC	Rushing	King Miller	18 carries, 70 yards
USC	Receiving	Ja'Kobi Lane	6 receptions, 111 yards, TD
Notre Dame	Passing	CJ Carr	16/26, 136 yards, TD
Notre Dame	Rushing	Jeremiyah Love	24 carries, 228 yards, TD
Notre Dame	Receiving	Jordan Faison	6 receptions, 60 yards

=== At Nebraska ===
No. 23 USC Trojans (5–2) at Nebraska Cornhuskers (6–2) – Game summary

Quarter	1	2	3	4	Total
No. 23 Trojans	0	6	8	7	21
Cornhuskers	7	7	0	3	17

at Memorial Stadium • Lincoln, Nebraska

- Date: November 1
- Game time: 4:37 p.m.
- Game weather: Clear • Temperature: 44 °F (7 °C) • Wind: NW at 6 miles per hour (9.7 km/h)
- Game attendance: 86,529
- Referee: Kole Knueppel
- TV announcers (NBC): Noah Eagle (play-by-play), Todd Blackledge (analyst), and Kathryn Tappen (sideline reporter)

Game information

First Quarter

- (6:29) NEB – Dane Key 14-yard pass from Dylan Raiola, Kyle Cunanan kick (Drive: 14 plays, 75 yards, 7:01, Nebraska 7–0)

Second Quarter

- (13:23) USC – Ryon Sayeri 24-yard field goal (Drive: 11 plays, 74 yards, 4:35, Nebraska 7–3)
- (6:07) USC – Ryon Sayeri 49-yard field goal (Drive: 10 plays, 53 yards, 4:22, Nebraska 7–6)
- (1:37) NEB – Emmett Johnson 10-yard run, Kyle Cunanan kick (Drive: 8 plays, 75 yards, 4:25, Nebraska 14–6)

Third Quarter

- (3:32) USC – Jayden Maiava 16-yard run, King Miller run (Drive: 5 plays, 66 yards, 1:51, 14–14)

Fourth Quarter

- (12:53) NEB – Kyle Cunanan 39-yard field goal (Drive: 10 plays, 57 yards, 5:33, Nebraska 17–14)
- (10:06) USC – King Miller 6-yard run, Ryon Sayeri kick (Drive: 6 plays, 75 yards, 2:47, USC 21–17)

Statistics	USC	NEB
First downs	20	20
Plays–yards	61–337	62–286
Rushes–yards	38–202	40–188
Passing yards	135	98
Passing: comp–att–int	9–23–1	15–22–0
Turnovers	1	1
Time of possession	27:02	32:58

Team	Category	Player	Statistics
USC	Passing	Jayden Maiava	9/23, 135 yards, INT
USC	Rushing	King Miller	18 carries, 129 yards, TD
USC	Receiving	Jaden Richardson	1 reception, 43 yards
Nebraska	Passing	Dylan Raiola	10/15, 91 yards, TD
Nebraska	Rushing	Emmett Johnson	29 carries, 165 yards, TD
Nebraska	Receiving	Nyziah Hunter	5 receptions, 30 yards

=== Northwestern ===
Northwestern Wildcats (5–3) at No. 19 USC Trojans (6–2) – Game summary

Quarter	1	2	3	4	Total
Wildcats	7	7	3	0	17
No. 19 Trojans	7	14	7	10	38

at Los Angeles Memorial Coliseum • Los Angeles, California

- Date: November 7
- Game time: 6:00 p.m.
- Game weather: Clear • Temperature: 67 °F (19 °C) • Wind: SW at 2 miles per hour (3.2 km/h)
- Game attendance: 67,179
- Referee: Mark Kluczynski
- TV announcers (FOX): Jason Benetti (play-by-play), Robert Griffin III (analyst), and Alexa Landestoy (sideline reporter)

Game information

First quarter

- (7:46) USC – Makai Lemon 7-yard pass from Jayden Maiava, Ryon Sayeri kick (Drive: 16 plays, 82 yards, 7:14; USC 7–0)
- (0:45) NU – Griffin Wilde 4-yard pass from Preston Stone, Jack Olsen kick (Drive: 13 plays, 75 yards, 7:01; Tied 7–7)

Second quarter

- (11:27) USC – Jayden Maiava 6-yard run, Ryon Sayeri kick (Drive: 9 plays, 58 yards, 4:12; USC 14–7)
- (7:26) NU – Caleb Komolafe 2-yard run, Jack Olsen kick (Drive: 7 plays, 75 yards, 4:01; Tied 14–14)
- (1:24) USC – King Miller 12-yard run, Ryon Sayeri kick (Drive: 3 plays, 80 yards, 1:23; USC 21–14)

Third quarter

- (7:56) USC – Ja'Kobi Lane 10-yard pass from Jayden Maiava, Ryon Sayeri kick (Drive: 8 plays, 91 yards, 4:12; USC 28–14)
- (0:17) NU – Jack Olsen 33-yard field goal (Drive: 12 plays, 60 yards, 7:39; USC 28–17)

Fourth quarter

- (11:14) USC – Makai Lemon 4-yard run, Ryon Sayeri kick (Drive: 7 plays, 75 yards, 4:03; USC 35–17)
- (4:40) USC – Ryon Sayeri 22-yard field goal (Drive: 8 plays, 49 yards, 4:39; USC 38–17)

Statistics	NU	USC
First downs	13	24
Plays–yards	55–280	64–482
Rushes–yards	25–130	30–173
Passing yards	150	309
Passing: comp–att–int	20–30-0	25–34–1
Turnovers	2	1
Time of possession	27:24	32:36

Team	Category	Player	Statistics
Northwestern	Passing	Preston Stone	20/30, 150 yards, TD
Northwestern	Rushing	Caleb Komolafe	17 carries, 118 yards, TD
Northwestern	Receiving	Caleb Komolafe	5 receptions, 40 yards
USC	Passing	Jayden Maiava	24/33, 299 yards, 2 TD, INT
USC	Rushing	King Miller	15 carries, 127 yards, TD
USC	Receiving	Makai Lemon	11 receptions, 161 yards, TD

=== No. 21 Iowa ===
No. 21 Iowa Hawkeyes (6–3) at No. 17 USC Trojans (7–2) – Game summary

Quarter	1	2	3	4	Total
No. 21 Hawkeyes	7	14	0	0	21
No. 17 Trojans	0	10	9	7	26

at Los Angeles Memorial Coliseum • Los Angeles, California

- Date: November 15
- Game time: 12:30 p.m.
- Game weather: Rain • Temperature: 61 °F (16 °C) • Wind: SE at 8 miles per hour (13 km/h)
- Game attendance: 65,216
- Referee: Chris Coyle
- TV announcers (BTN): Rhett Lewis (play-by-play), Yogi Roth (analyst), and Dannie Rogers (sideline reporter)

Game information

First quarter

- (11:26) IOWA - Dayton Howard 2-yard pass from Mark Gronowski (Drew Stevens kick), (Drive: 7 plays, 69 yards, 3:29; Iowa 7-0)

Second quarter

- (14:12) IOWA - Mark Gronowski 1-yard run (Drew Stevens kick), (Drive: 9 plays, 45 yards, 5:47; Iowa 14-0)
- (9:15) USC - Bryan Jackson 1-yard run (Ryon Sayeri kick), (Drive: 11 plays, 75 yards, 4:57; Iowa 14-7)
- (3:24) IOWA - Mark Gronowski 5-yard pass from Reece Vander Zee (Drew Stevens kick), (Drive: 9 plays, 75 yards, 5:51; Iowa 21-7)
- (0:39) USC - Ryon Sayeri 40-yard field goal, (Drive: 8 plays, 52 yards, 2:45; Iowa 21-10)

Third quarter

- (11:11) USC - Ryon Sayeri 28-yard field goal, (Drive: 9 plays, 70 yards, 3:46; Iowa 21-13)
- (3:33) USC - Makai Lemon 12-yard pass from Jayden Maiava (Two-Point Conversion pass to Makai Lemon from Jayden Maiava is no good), (Drive: 9 plays, 82 yards, 4:16; Iowa 21-19)

Fourth quarter

- (13:36) USC - Bryan Jackson 1-yard run (Ryon Sayeri kick), (Drive: 6 plays, 40 yards, 3:18; USC 26-21)

Statistics	IOWA	USC
First downs	17	21
Plays–yards	53–320	63–360
Rushes–yards	33–183	31–106
Passing yards	137	254
Passing: comp–att–int	13–20–1	23–32–0
Turnovers	1	0
Time of possession	30:44	29:16

Team	Category	Player	Statistics
Iowa	Passing	Mark Gronowski	12/19, 132 yards, TD, INT
Iowa	Rushing	Kamari Moulton	15 carries, 90 yards
Iowa	Receiving	DJ Vonnahme	4 receptions, 59 yards
USC	Passing	Jayden Maiava	23/32, 254 yards, TD
USC	Rushing	King Miller	19 carries, 83 yards
USC	Receiving	Makai Lemon	10 receptions, 153 yards, TD

=== At No. 7 Oregon (rivalry) ===
No. 15 USC Trojans (8–2) at No. 7 Oregon Ducks (9–1) – Game summary

Quarter	1	2	3	4	Total
No. 15 Trojans	7	7	7	6	27
No. 7 Ducks	14	14	7	7	42

at Autzen Stadium • Eugene, Oregon

- Date: November 22
- Game time: 12:30 p.m.
- Game weather: Sunny • Temperature: 45 °F (7 °C) • Wind: 0 miles per hour (0 km/h)
- Game attendance: 59,588
- Referee: Bryan Banks
- TV announcers (CBS): Brad Nessler (play-by-play), Gary Danielson (analyst), and Jenny Dell (sideline reporter)

Game information

First quarter

- (9:54) USC – Makai Lemon 8-yard pass from Jayden Maiava (Ryon Sayeri kick),(Drive: 11 plays, 75 yards, 5:06; USC 7–0)
- (7:05) ORE – Jordon Davison 11-yard run(Atticus Sappington kick),(Drive: 6 plays, 65 yards, 2:49; Tied 7–7)
- (1:31) ORE – Kenyon Sadiq 8-yard pass from Dante Moore (Atticus Sappington kick), (Drive: 11 plays, 67 yards, ORE 14–7)

Second quarter

- (14:52) USC – Tanook Hines 24-yard pass from Makai Lemon (Ryon Sayeri kick), (Drive: 5 plays, 75 yards, 1:39; Tied 14–14)
- (9:58) ORE – Malik Benson 85-yard punt return (Atticus Sappington kick), (Drive: 6 plays, 20 yards, 2:44; ORE 21–14)
- (1:52) ORE – Bryce Bottecher 1-yard run (Atticus Sappington kick), (Drive: 12 plays, 56 yards, 5:56; ORE 28–14)

Third quarter

- (5:48) USC – Makai Lemon 4-yard pass from Jayden Maiava (Ryon Sayeri kick), (Drive: 9 plays, 52 yards, 4:36; ORE 28–21)
- (2:13) ORE – Kenyon Sadiq 27-yard pass from Dante Moore (Atticus Sappington kick), (Drive: 7 plays, 75 yards, 3:35; ORE 35–21)

Fourth quarter

- (11:32) USC – Lake McRee 9-yard pass from Jayden Maiava (Drive: 4 plays, 58 yards, 2:02; ORE 35–27)
- (5:30) ORE – Noah Whittington 9-yard run (Atticus Sappington kick), (Drive: 11 plays, 79 yards, 5:58; ORE 42–27)

Statistics	USC	ORE
First downs	23	26
Plays–yards	72–382	71–436
Rushes–yards	28–52	41–179
Passing yards	330	257
Passing: comp–att–int	26–44–2	22–30–1
Turnovers	2	1
Time of possession	26:56	33:04

Team	Category	Player	Statistics
USC	Passing	Jayden Maiava	25/43, 306 yards, 3 TD, 2 INT
USC	Rushing	King Miller	15 carries, 30 yards
USC	Receiving	Makai Lemon	7 receptions, 34 yards, 2 TD
Oregon	Passing	Dante Moore	22/30, 257 yards, 2 TD, INT
Oregon	Rushing	Noah Whittington	19 carries, 104 yards, TD
Oregon	Receiving	Kenyon Sadiq	6 receptions, 72 yards, 2 TD

=== UCLA (Victory Bell) ===
UCLA Bruins (3–8) at No. 17 USC Trojans (8–3) – Game summary

Quarter	1	2	3	4	Total
Bruins	0	10	0	0	10
No. 17 Trojans	7	0	7	15	29

at Los Angeles Memorial Coliseum • Los Angeles, California

- Date: November 29
- Game time: 4:30 p.m.
- Game weather: Sunny • Temperature: 72 °F (22 °C) • Wind: SSW at 4 miles per hour (6.4 km/h)
- Game attendance: 69,614
- Referee: Gregory Blum
- TV announcers (NBC): Noah Eagle (play-by-play), Todd Blackledge (analyst), and Kathryn Tappen (sideline reporter)

Game information

First quarter

- (9:15) USC – King Miller 5-yard run (Ryon Sayeri kick), (Drive: 10 plays, 75 yards, 5:45; USC 7–0)

Second quarter

- (11:23) UCLA – Kwazi Gilmer 2-yard pass from Nico Lamaleava (Mateen Bhaghani kick), (Drive: 13 plays, 79 yards, 7:50; Tied 7–7)
- (0:18) UCLA – Mateen Bhaghani 38-yard field goal (Drive: 13 plays, 60 yards, 5:24; UCLA 10–7)

Third quarter

- (0:25) USC – Makai Lemon 42-yard pass from Jayden Maiava (Ryon Sayeri kick), (Drive: 10 plays, 91 yards, 4:52; USC 14–10)

Fourth quarter

- (11:24) USC – Lake McRee 2-yard pass from Jayden Maiava (Ryon Sayeri kick), (Drive: 4 plays, 57 yards, 2:30; USC 21–10)
- (2:29) USC – King Miller 41-yard run (Gage Roy–Walker Lyons pass), (Drive: 4 plays, 50 yards, 1:48; USC 29–10)

Statistics	UCLA	USC
First downs	20	22
Plays–yards	64–308	55–388
Rushes–yards	26–108	26–131
Passing yards	200	257
Passing: comp–att–int	27–38–0	21–29–0
Turnovers	0	0
Time of possession	33:16	26:44

Team	Category	Player	Statistics
UCLA	Passing	Nico Iamaleava	27/38, 200 yards, TD
UCLA	Rushing	Jalen Berger	7 carries, 57 yards
UCLA	Receiving	Kwazi Gilmer	10 receptions, 73 yards, TD
USC	Passing	Jayden Maiava	21/29, 257 yards, 2 TD
USC	Rushing	King Miller	17 carries, 124 yards, 2 TD
USC	Receiving	Ja'Kobi Lane	3 receptions, 52 yards

=== Vs. TCU (Alamo Bowl) ===
2025 Valero Alamo Bowl
No. 16 USC Trojans (9–3) vs. TCU Horned Frogs (8–4) – Game summary

Quarter	1	2	3	4	OT	Total
No. 16 Trojans	3	10	8	3	3	27
Horned Frogs	0	14	0	10	6	30

at Alamodome • San Antonio, Texas

- Date: December 30
- Game time: 6:00 p.m. PST
- Game weather: None (played indoors)
- Game attendance: 54,571
- Referee: Justin Eillot
- TV announcers (ESPN): Bob Wischusen (play-by-play), Louis Riddick (analyst) and Dana Boyle (sideline)

Game information

First quarter

- (7:06) USC – Ryon Sayeri 40-yard field goal (7 plays, 50 yards, 3:46; USC 3–0)

Second quarter

- (13:36) TCU – Jon Denman 5-yard run (Kyle Lemmermann kick) (9 plays, 69 yards, 3:55; TCU 7–3)
- (9:57) USC – King Miller 2-yard run (Ryon Sayeri kick) (7 plays, 75 yards, 3:39; USC 10–7)
- (4:58) TCU – Ken Seals 1-yard run (Kyle Lemmermann kick) (13 plays, 75 yards, 4:59; TCU 14–10)
- (0:18) USC – Ryon Sayeri 28-yard field goal (10 plays, 64 yards, 4:40; TCU 14–13)

Third quarter

- (0:49) USC – Jaden Richardson 21-yard pass from Jayden Maiava (Jayden Maiava pass to Taniela Tupou for two-point conversion) (5 plays, 73 yards, 3:02; USC 21–14)

Fourth quarter

- (9:37) USC – Ryon Sayeri 41-yard field goal (8 plays, 46 yards, 5:05; USC 24–14)
- (4:24) TCU – Jeremy Payne 5-yard run (Kyle Lemmermann kick) (11 plays, 75 yards, 5:13; USC 24–21)
- (0:02) TCU – Kyle Lemmermann 27-yard field goal (13 plays, 59 yards, 2:44; Tied 24–24)

Overtime

- (OT) USC – Ryon Sayeri 22-yard field goal (6 plays, 20 yards; USC 27–24)
- (OT) TCU – Jeremy Payne 35-yard pass from Ken Seals (3 plays, 35 yards; TCU 30–27)

Statistics	USC	TCU
First downs	19	20
Plays–yards	63–392	71–375
Rushes–yards	33–112	31–117
Passing yards	280	258
Passing: Comp–Att–Int	18–30–2	29–40–1
Turnovers	2	1
Time of possession	31:52	28:08

Team	Category	Player	Statistics
USC	Passing	Jayden Maiava	18/30, 280 yards, TD, 2 INT
USC	Rushing	King Miller	25 carries, 99 yards, TD
USC	Receiving	Tanook Hines	6 receptions, 163 yards
TCU	Passing	Ken Seals	29/40, 258 yards, TD, INT
TCU	Rushing	Jeremy Payne	13 carries, 73 yards, TD
TCU	Receiving	Eric McAlister	8 receptions, 69 yards

== Personnel ==
=== Roster and coaching staff ===
2025 USC Trojans football team roster
Players
Coaches
Offense

Pos.	#	Name	Class
WR	0	Zacharyus Williams	So
RB	1	Eli Sanders	Sr
RB	2	Waymond Jordan	Jr
QB	4	Husan Longstreet	Fr
WR	6	Makai Lemon	Jr
QB	7	Sam Huard	Sr
WR	8	Ja'Kobi Lane	Jr
WR	9	Jay Fair	Sr
RB	10	James Johnson	Fr
QB	14	Jayden Maiava	Jr
WR	15	Jaden Richardson	Sr
WR	16	Tanook Hines	Fr
WR	17	Prince Strachan	Jr
TE	18	Joey Olsen	Fr
WR	19	D. J. Jordan	Fr
RB	21	Bryan Jackson II	So
WR	22	Corey Simms	Fr
TE	23	Walter Matthews	Fr
TE	24	Carson Tabaracci	Jr
RB	25	Harry Dalton III	Fr
QB	26	Dylan Gebbia	So
RB	27	Riley Wormley	Fr
QB	28	Gage Roy	Jr
RB	30	King Miller	Fr
RB	40	Seneca Moore	Fr
RB	41	Cian McKelvey	So
WR	44	Josiah Zamora	Sr
WR	46	Corey Nerhus	Sr
TE	49	Fisher Melton	Fr
OL	50	J'Onre Reed	Sr
OL	52	Willi Wascher	Fr
OL	59	Micah Bañuelos	So
OL	60	Kaylon Miller	Fr
OL	61	Jack Susnjar	So
OL	62	Travis Leonard	Fr
OL	65	Erwin Taomi	So
OL	67	Kilian O'Connor	Jr
OL	68	Hayden Treter	Fr
OL	70	Aaron Dunn	Fr
OL	71	Alex Payne	Fr
OL	72	Elijah Paige	So
OL	73	Tobias Raymond	So
OL	74	Justin Tauanuu	Fr
OL	75	Ratumana Bulabalavu	Fr
OL	77	Alani Noa	Jr
OL	78	Makai Saina	Fr
OL	79	Elijah Vaikona	Fr
WR	81	Cam Sermons	Fr
WR	82	Seth Zamora	Fr
WR	83	Brady Jung	Fr
WR	84	Romero Ison	Fr
TE	85	Walker Lyons	So
WR	86	Asante Das	Sr
TE	87	Lake McRee	Sr
TE	88	Taniela Tupou	Fr
WR	89	Collin Fasse	Fr

Defense

Pos.	#	Name	Class
DT	0	Jamaal Jarrett	So
DE	1	Kameryn Crawford	So
CB	2	D. J. Harvey	Sr
DT	4	Jahkeem Stewart	Fr
DE	6	Anthony Lucas	Sr
S	7	Kamari Ramsey	Jr
DT	8	Devan Thompkins	Jr
DT	9	Keeshawn Silver	Sr
DE	10	Braylan Shelby	Jr
LB	14	Ta'Mere Robinson	So
LB	15	Anthony Beavers Jr.	Sr
CB	16	Prophet Brown	Sr
CB	17	DeCarlos Nicholson	Sr
LB	18	Eric Gentry	Sr
S	19	Bishop Fitzgerald	Sr
CB	21	Chasen Johnson	So
CB	22	Braylon Conley	Fr
LB	23	Desman Stephens II	So
S	24	Christian Pierce	Jr
CB	25	Marcelles Williams	Fr
LB	26	Elijah Newby	Fr
CB	27	Alex Graham	Fr
S	28	Kennedy Urlacher	So
LB	29	Garrison Madden	Jr
S	30	Marquis Gallegos	Fr
LB	31	Jadyn Walker	Fr
CB	34	Kevin Longstreet	So
S	36	Steve Miller	Fr
CB	37	Trestin Castro	Fr
S	38	Isaiah Rubin	Fr
DE	39	Garrett Pomerantz	Jr
CB	40	Shawn Sehra	So
S	41	Kendarius Reddick	Fr
CB	42	R. J. Sermons	Fr
LB	44	Matai Tagoa’i	Fr
S	45	Brandon Shepherd	Jr
LB	46	Nick De Fina	Jr
CB	47	Isaac Shin	Fr
LB	51	Ryan Quintanar	Sr
LB	54	A. J. Tuitele	Fr
LB	57	Roman Marchetti	Jr
DT	58	Malique Amos	Jr
DT	88	Floyd Boucard	Fr
DE	90	Gus Cordova	Fr
DT	91	Brendan Cho	Fr
DT	92	Carlon Jones	Fr
DT	94	Kobe Pepe	Sr
DE	95	Jadyn Ramos	Fr
DT	97	Jide Abasiri	So
DT	98	Cash Jacobsen	Fr

Special teams

Pos.	#	Name	Class
LS	31	Hank Pepper	Sr
P	36	Rey Sanchez	Jr
K	45	Caden Chittenden	So
LS	47	Devin McDonough	Jr
K	48	Ryon Sayeri	Fr
LS	53	Luke Brown	Fr
P	80	Sam Johnson	Sr
P	93	Will Weisberg	Fr

Head coach

- Lincoln Riley

Coordinators/assistant coaches

- D'Anton Lynn – Defensive coordinator
- Luke Huard – Offensive coordinator/quarterbacks
- Dennis Simmons – Assistant head coach/passing game coordinator/wide receivers
- Anthony Jones Jr. – Running backs/run game coordinator
- Zach Hanson – Assistant head coach for offense/Offensive line
- Chad Savage – Tight ends/inside wide receivers
- Eric Henderson – Co-Defensive coordinator/run game coordinator/defensive line
- Shaun Nua – Defensive ends
- Rob Ryan – Assistant head coach for defense/linebackers
- Doug Belk – Secondary/safeties
- Trovon Reed – Cornerbacks
- Ryan Dougherty – Special teams coordinator
- Trumain Carroll – Director of football sports performances
- Chad Bowden – General manager
- Dre Brown – Assistant general manager

- AJ Howard – Defensive assistant (LB)/assistant linebackers coach
- Joe D'Orazio – Offensive assistant (RB)/director of football strategy
- John McDonnell – Senior offensive analyst
- Bradley Aoki – Offensive analyst (QB)
- Spencer Jones – Offensive analyst (WR)
- Grayson Reed – Offensive analyst (OL)
- Robert Roh – Offensive analyst (WR)
- Adrian Klemm – Senior defensive analyst
- Skyler Jones – Defensive analyst (DL)
- Bookie Radley-Hiles – Defensive analyst (NK)
- Gordon Redfield-Gale – Defensive analyst (DE)
- Matthew Ryan – Defensive analyst
- Lonnie Maddox – Associate director of football sports performance
- Kerry Thompson – Assistant director of football sports performance
- Caesar Martinez – Assistant director of football sports performance
- Derrick Baker – Assistant strength and conditioning coach
- Jackson Polk – Director of sports science
- Eric Espinoza – Director of football video operations
- Spencer Missioreck – Football video & systems analyst

Legend

- (C) Team captain
- (S) Suspended
- (I) Ineligible
- Injured
- Redshirt

Roster
Last update: 7/30/25

=== Depth chart ===
Defense
4-3

FS
Kamari Ramsey
Christian Pierce

WILL	MIKE	SAM
Jadyn Walker	Desman Stephens II	Eric Gentry
Elijah Newby or Anthony Beavers Jr. *	Ta’Mere Robinson or Anthony Beavers Jr. *	Matai Tagoa’i

SS
Bishop Fitzgerald
Kennedy Urlacher

CB
Marcelles Williams
DJ Harvey

DE	DT	DT	DE
Kameryn Crawford	Devan Thompkins *	Jide Abasiri	Anthony Lucas
Braylan Shelby	Keeshawn Silver	Jahkeem Stewart	Devan Thompkins *

CB
DeCarlos Nicholson
Braylon Conley

Offense
Pro-style

WR
Ja’Kobi Lane
Jaden Richardson

WR
Tanook Hines
DJ Jordan

LT	LG	C	RG	RT
Elijah Paige	Tobias Raymond	J’Onre Reed	Alani Noa	Justin Tauanuu *
Justin Tauanuu *	Micah Bañuelos	Kaylon Miller *	Kaylon Miller *	Elijah Vaikona

TE
Lake McRee
Walker Lyons

WR
Makai Lemon
Jay Fair

QB
Jayden Maiava
Husan Longstreet

Key reserves
Offense
Defense
Special teams
Out (indefinitely)
Out (season injury)
Out (redshirting)
Out (suspended)
Out (retired)

RB
King Miller
Bryan Jackson

Special teams
PK Ryon Sayeri
P Sam Johnson
KR -
PR Makai Lemon
LS Hank Pepper
H -

True Freshman
Double Position : * official Depth Chart (10/29/2025)

=== Injury report/Redshirting ===
Name	Position	Class	Injury	Duration
Chasen Johnson	CB	Sophomore	Knee	Season
Eli Sanders	RB	(redshirt) Senior	Knee	Season
Jamaal Jarrett	DL	(redshirt) Sophomore	tbd	Season

=== Scholarship distribution chart ===
Position/Year	Freshman (38)	Sophomore (15)	Junior (13)	Senior (19)	2026 commit (32)	2027 commit (-)
QB 3 (1)	Husan Longstreet	-	Jayden Maiava	Sam Huard	Jonas Williams	-
RB 5 (2)	Harry Dalton III; Riley Wormley	Bryan Jackson II	Waymond Jordan Jr.	Eli Sanders	Shahn Alston; Deshonne Redeaux	-
WR 11 (5)	Tanook Hines; Romero Ison; Xavier Jordan; Corey Simms	Zacharyus Williams	Ja’Kobi Lane; Makai Lemon; Prince Strachan	Jay Fair; Jaden Richardson; Josiah Zamora	Ja’Myron Baker; Boobie Feaster; Trent Mosley; Roderick Tezeno Jr. Luc Weaver	-
TE 6 (1)	Walter Matthews; Joey Olsen; Nela Tupou	Walker Lyons	Carson Tabaracci	Lake McRee	Mark Bowman	-
OL 15 (7)	Aaron Dunn; Alex Payne; Ratumana Bulabalavu; Makai Saina; Justin Tauanuu; Hayden Treter; Elijah Vaikona; Willi Wascher	Micah Bañuelos; Elijah Paige; Tobias Raymond; Erwin Taomi	Alani Noa	Kilian O'Connor; J’Onre Reed	Chase Deniz; Vlad Dyakonov; John Fifita; Breck Kolojay; Keenyi Pepe; Kannon Smith; Esun Tafa	-
DL 8 (4)	Floyd Boucard; Gus Cordova; Cash Jacobsen; Carlon Jones	Jide Abasiri	Jamaal Jarrett	Kobe Pepe; Keeshawn Silver	Malik Brooks; Jake Johnson; Tomuhini Topui; Jaimeon Winfield	-
DE 7 (4)	Jadyn Ramos; Jahkeem Stewart	Kameryn Fountain	Braylan Shelby; Devan Thompkins	Anthony Lucas	Braeden Jones Simote Katoanga; Luke Wafle; Andrew Williams	-
LB 9 (3)	Elijah Newby; Matai Tagoa’i; AJ Tuitele; Jadyn Walker	Ta’Mere Robinson; Desman Stephens II	Garrison Madden	Anthony Beavers Jr. Eric Gentry	Talanoa Ili; Taylor Johnson; Shaun Scott	-
CB 10 (3)	Trestin Castro; Braylon Conley; Alex Graham; Isaiah Rubin; RJ Sermons; Marcelles Williams	Chasen Johnson	-	Prophet Brown; DJ Harvey; DeCarlos Nicholson	Peyton Dyer; Elbert Hill IV; Brandon Lockhart	-
S 8 (2)	Marquis Gallegos; James Johnson; Steve Miller; Kendarius Reddick	Kennedy Urlacher	Christian Pierce; Kamari Ramsey	Bishop Fitzgerald	Joshua Holland II; Madden Riordan	-
SP 4 (-)	Ryon Sayeri	Caden Chittenden	-	Sam Johnson; Hank Pepper	-	-
ATH (-)	-	-	-	-	-	-

- Scholarship Distribution 2025 chart

^ : the players who still have to make an official choice and the players who are eligible for the Covid year.

redshirt year used / redshirt year eligible / * Former Walk-on / LDS Mission

– - players on scholarships / 105 scholarships permitted

=== Coaching staff additions & promotions ===
Name	Position	Old team	Old position
Zach Hanson	Offensive Line	-	Tight ends
Chad Savage	Tight end/inside wide receivers	Colorado State	Wide receivers/recruiting coordinator
Rob Ryan	Assistant head coach for defense/linebackers	Las Vegas Raiders (NFL)	Senior defensive assistant
Chad Bowden	General manager	Notre Dame	Assistant athletics director/general manager
Trovon Reed	Cornerbacks	UCF	Cornerbacks
Luke Huard	Offensive coordinator/quarterbacks	-	Quarterbacks
AJ Howard	Assistant coach (LB)	Appalachian State	Outside linebackers coach
Trumain Carroll	Director of football sports performance	Kansas State	Director of strength and conditioning
Lonnie Maddox	Associate director of football sports performance	Kansas State	Assistant strength and conditioning coach
Kerry Thompson	Associate director of football sports performance	Alabama State	Assistant athletic director for performance enhancement

=== Coaching staff departures ===
Name	Position	New Team	New Position
Josh Henson	Offensive coordinator / Offensive Line	Purdue	Offensive coordinator / Tight ends
Matt Entz	Assistant head coach for defense / Linebackers	Fresno State	Head coach
Zach Crabtree	Assistant offensive line	Fresno State	Offensive Line
Taylor Mays	Assistant defensive backs	Washington	Safeties
Bryson Allen-Williams	Defensive graduate assistant (LB)	Georgia	TBA
Bennie Wylie	Director of football sports performance	TBA	TBA
Drew Smith	Assistant director of football sports performance	Los Angeles Rams	Assistant strength and conditioning coach / coordinator
Caleb Withrow	Assistant director of football sports performance	TBA	TBA

=== Transfers ===
==== Transfers out ====
The Trojans have lost 27 players via transfer.

Name	Pos.	Height	Weight	Year	Hometown	New school
Miller Moss	QB	6’2	205	(redshirt) Junior	Los Angeles, CA	Louisville
Jake Jensen	QB	6’1	212	(redshirt) Junior	Pleasant Grove, UT	Montana
Quinten Joyner	RB	5’11	216	(redshirt) Freshman	Paige, TX	Texas Tech
A’Marion Peterson	RB	6’0	217	(redshirt) Freshman	Wichita Falls, TX	UTSA
Zachariah Branch	WR	5’10	175	Sophomore	Las Vegas, NV	Georgia
Duce Robinson	WR	6’6	220	Sophomore	Phoenix, AZ	Florida State
Kyron Hudson	WR	6’1	205	(redshirt) Junior	Duarte, CA	Penn State
Charles Ross	WR	6’1	165	(redshirt) Senior	Culver City, CA	Purdue
Kade Eldridge	TE	6’4	250	(redshirt) Freshman	Lynden, WA	Washington
Kalolo Ta’aga	OL	6’7	315	Freshman	East Palo Alto, CA	Utah
Gino Quinones	OL	6’3	302	(redshirt) Senior	Ewa Beach, HI	Fresno State
Amos Talalele	OL	6’4	340	(redshirt) Freshman	Santa Clara, CA	Kansas State
Mason Murphy	OL	6’5	315	(redshirt) Junior	Riverside, CA	Auburn
Emmanuel Pregnon	OL	6’5	320	(redshirt) Senior	Denver, CO	Oregon
Elijah Hughes	DL	6’3	290	Sophomore	Arlington, VA	Notre Dame
Bear Alexander	DT	6’3	315	Junior	Terrell, TX	Oregon
DJ Peevy	DE	6’3	260	(redshirt) Freshman	San Diego, CA	Montana
Sam Greene	DE	6’1	255	(redshirt) Freshman	Washington, DC	Kentucky
Solomon Tuliaupupu	DE	6’3	247	(redshirt) Senior	Santa Ana, CA	Montana
Lorenzo Cowan	DE	6’3	240	Freshman	Savannah, GA	Kentucky
Raesjon Davis	LB	6’2	220	Senior	Norco, CA	Oregon State
Maliki Crawford	CB	6’4	185	(redshirt) Freshman	Oxnard, CA	San José State
Zion Branch	S	6’2	210	(redshirt) Sophomore	Las Vegas, NV	Georgia
Jarvis Boatwright Jr.	S	6’1	190	Freshman	Clearwater, FL	Florida State
Denis Lynch	K	5’8	185	(redshirt) Junior	Newbury Park, CA	San José State
Garth White	K	6’3	206	Senior	Westlake, CA	Rhode Island
Tyler Robles	K	5’7	175	(redshirt) Freshman	Encinitas, CA	Texas State

==== Transfers in ====
The Trojans have added 16 players via transfer.

Name	Pos.	Height	Weight	Year	Hometown	Old school
Sam Huard	QB	6’2	204	Senior	Bellevue, WA	Utah
Eli Sanders	RB	5’11	194	(redshirt) Junior	Oceanside, CA	New Mexico
Prince Strachan	WR	6’5	211	Sophomore	Freeport, BS	Boise State
Zacharyus Williams	WR	6’2	196	Sophomore	Carson, CA	Utah
J’Onre Reed	OL	6’3	316	Senior	Houston, TX	Syracuse
DJ Wingfield	OL	6’4	316	(redshirt) Junior	Los Angeles, CA	Purdue
Keeshawn Silver	DL	6’4	336	(redshirt) Junior	Rocky Mount, NC	Kentucky
Jamaal Jarrett	DL	6’5	350	Sophomore	Greensboro, NC	Georgia
Ta’Mere Robinson	LB	6’3	223	(redshirt) Sophomore	Pittsburgh, PA	Penn State
DJ Harvey	CB	5’11	190	(redshirt) Junior	Palmdale, CA	San José State
Chasen Johnson	CB	6’1	180	Freshman	Sanford, FL	UCF
Kevin Longstreet	CB	5’10	185	Freshman	Inglewood, CA	Texas A&M
Bishop Fitzgerald	S	6’0	195	(redshirt) Senior	Woodbridge, VA	NC State
Kennedy Urlacher	S	5’11	197	Sophomore	Chandler, AZ	Notre Dame
Caden Chittenden	K	5’11	175	Freshman	Las Vegas, NV	UNLV
Sam Johnson	P	6’4	230	(redshirt) Senior	Birmingham, AL	Valparaiso

=== NFL draft ===
==== Entered NFL draft ====
The following players have headed for the 2025 NFL Draft : RB Woody Marks, WR Kyle Ford, OL Jonah Monheim, DL Gavin Meyer, EDGE Jamil Muhammad, LB Mason Cobb, LB Easton Mascarenas-Arnold, CB Jacobe Covington, CB John Humphrey, CB Greedy Vance Jr., DB Jaylin Smith, S Akili Arnold, S Bryson Shaw, K Michael Lantz & P Eddie Czaplicki.

Player	Position	Round	Pick	Drafted by
Jaylin Smith	DB	3	97	Houston Texans
Woody Marks	RB	4	116	Houston Texans
Jonah Monheim	OL	7	221	Jacksonville Jaguars
Jamil Muhammad	EDGE	UDFA		Los Angeles Rams
Easton Mascarenas-Arnold	LB	UDFA		Cleveland Browns
Jacobe Covington	CB	UDFA		Kansas City Chiefs
John Humphrey	CB	UDFA		Las Vegas Raiders
Greedy Vance Jr.	CB	UDFA		Las Vegas Raiders
Eddie Czaplicki	P	UDFA		Kansas City Chiefs
Kyle Ford	WR			
Gavin Meyer	DL			
Mason Cobb	LB			
Akili Arnold	S			
Bryson Shaw	S			
Michael Lantz	K			

==== NFL Draft Combine ====
Participants
Name	POS	40	Bench press	Vert jump	20-yd shuttle	3-cone drill	Broad jump
Woody Marks	RB	4.54	18	35”	4.24	DNP	9’11”
Jonah Monheim	OL	DNP	DNP	DNP	DNP	DNP	DNP
Jaylin Smith	CB	4.45	DNP	32.5“	DNP	DNP	10’2”

† Top performer DNP = Did not participate

==== USC Pro Day ====
2025 USC Pro Day
Name	POS	HT	WT	Arms	Hands	40	Bench press	Vert jump	20-yd shuttle	3-cone drill	Broad jump
Woody Marks	RB	5’10 1/8”	213	29 3/4”	9”	4.52	DNP	DNP	DNP	DNP	DNP
Kyle Ford	WR	6’1 5/8”	223	31 7/8”	9 7/8”	4.72	DNP	29”	4.36	6.95	9’6”
Jonah Monheim	OL	6’4 1/4”	303	30 1/2”	9 1/4”	DNP	DNP	DNP	DNP	DNP	DNP
Gavin Meyer	DL	6’3 1/8”	285	31 3/8”	9 5/8”	4.87	DNP	27”	4.50	7.40	9’1”
Jamil Muhammad	EDGE	6’0 3/4”	254	32 3/4”	10”	4.83	25	DNP	4.42	7.18	DNP
Mason Cobb	LB	5’11 3/4”	232	30 1/4”	9”	DNP	20	DNP	DNP	DNP	DNP
Easton Mascarenas-Arnold	LB	5’11 1/8”	227	30 3/8”	9 3/8”	4.58	25	32”	4.28	DNP	10’
Jacobe Covington	CB	6’1 3/4”	207	32 1/2”	9 1/4”	4.62	12	33 1/2”	4.52	7.09	10’1”
John Humphrey	CB	6’2 1/4”	193	33”	9 1/2”	4.54	9	39”	4.23	7.33	10’
Jaylin Smith	CB	5’10 5/8”	194	30 3/8”	9 1/4”	DNP	15	DNP	DNP	DNP	DNP
Greedy Vance Jr.	CB	5’9 7/8”	182	30 1/8”	8”	4.64	13	34”	4.20	7.09	10’7”
Akili Arnold	S	5’11 1/8”	196	30”	8 5/8”	4.69	19	32.5”	4.24	6.90	9’5”
Bryson Shaw	S	6’0 1/4”	190	31 1/8”	8 3/8”	4.69	5	31”	4.50	7.06	9’6”
Michael Lantz	K	5’11	192	29 1/4”	8 5/8”	DNP	DNP	DNP	DNP	DNP	DNP
Eddie Czaplicki	P	6’0 7/8”	200	29 1/2”	9 1/4”	DNP	DNP	DNP	DNP	DNP	DNP
Jac Casasante	LS (2023)	5’11 3/4”	230	31 7/8”	9 1/8”	DNP	21	DNP	DNP	DNP	DNP

† Top performer DNP = Did not participate

=== Returning starters ===
Offense

Player	Position	Games started
Jayden Maiava	Quarterback	4 games
Bryan Jackson II	Running back	1 game
A'Marion Peterson	Running back	1 game
Ja'Kobi Lane	Wide receiver	8 games
Makai Lemon	Wide receiver	6 games
Lake McRee	Tight end	9 games
Walker Lyons	Tight end	3 games
Elijah Paige	Offensive line	13 games
Alani Noa	Offensive line	12 games
Tobias Raymond	Offensive line	1 game
Kilian O'Connor	Offensive Line	1 game

Defense

Player	Position	Games started
Devan Thompkins	Defensive line	6 games
Anthony Lucas	Defensive end	6 games
Kameryn Fountain	Defensive end	4 games
Braylan Shelby	Defensive end	3 games
Eric Gentry	Linebacker	2 games
DeCarlos Nicholson	Cornerback	3 games
Kamari Ramsey	Safety	11 games
Anthony Beavers Jr.	Safety	5 games

Special teams

Player	Position	Games started
Hank Pepper	Long snapper	13 games

=== Recruiting class ===
College recruiting (2025)
Name	Hometown	School	Height	Weight	Commit date
Husan Longstreet #3 QB #16 nat.	Corona, CA	Centennial HS	6 ft 1 in (1.85 m)	195 lb (88 kg)	November 17, 2024 (Committed) / December 4, 2024 (Signed)
Husan Longstreet #3 QB #16 nat.	Recruit ratings: Rivals: 247Sports: On3: ESPN:				
Harry Dalton III #27 RB #377 nat.	Dinwiddie, VA	Dinwiddie HS	5 ft 11 in (1.80 m)	205 lb (93 kg)	April 7, 2024 (Committed) / December 4, 2024 (Signed)
Harry Dalton III #27 RB #377 nat.	Recruit ratings: Rivals: 247Sports: On3: ESPN:				
Riley Wormley #41 RB #503 nat.	Colleyville, TX	Southlake Carroll HS	5 ft 10 in (1.78 m)	170 lb (77 kg)	March 31, 2024 (Committed) / December 4, 2024 (Signed)
Riley Wormley #41 RB #503 nat.	Recruit ratings: Rivals: 247Sports: On3: ESPN:				
Waymond Jordan Jr. #1 RB #18 JuCo	Pensacola, FL	Hutchinson C.C.	5 ft 10 in (1.78 m)	205 lb (93 kg)	January 5, 2025 (Committed) / January 5, 2025 (Signed)
Waymond Jordan Jr. #1 RB #18 JuCo	Recruit ratings: Rivals: 247Sports: On3: ESPN:				
Romero Ison #52 WR #357 nat.	Baltimore, MD	Milford Mill Academy	5 ft 11 in (1.80 m)	170 lb (77 kg)	April 9, 2024 (Committed) / December 4, 2024 (Signed)
Romero Ison #52 WR #357 nat.	Recruit ratings: Rivals: 247Sports: On3: ESPN:				
Corey Simms #53 WR #358 nat.	Saint Louis, MO	Christian Brothers College HS	6 ft 3 in (1.91 m)	190 lb (86 kg)	June 30, 2024 (Committed) / December 4, 2024 (Signed)
Corey Simms #53 WR #358 nat.	Recruit ratings: Rivals: 247Sports: On3: ESPN:				
Tanook Hines #55 WR #370 nat.	Houston, TX	Dekaney HS	6 ft 0 in (1.83 m)	170 lb (77 kg)	July 15, 2024 (Committed) / December 4, 2024 (Signed)
Tanook Hines #55 WR #370 nat.	Recruit ratings: Rivals: 247Sports: On3: ESPN:				
Cam Sermons; WR	Rancho Cucamonga, CA	Rancho Cucamonga HS	5 ft 10 in (1.78 m)	165 lb (75 kg)	January 20, 2025 (Committed)
Cam Sermons; WR	Recruit ratings: 247Sports:				
Nela Tupou #39 TE #761 nat.	Folsom, CA	Folsom HS	6 ft 4 in (1.93 m)	210 lb (95 kg)	November 24, 2024 (Committed) / December 4, 2024 (Signed)
Nela Tupou #39 TE #761 nat.	Recruit ratings: Rivals: 247Sports: On3: ESPN:				
Alex Payne #15 OT #162 nat.	Gainesville, GA	Gainesville HS	6 ft 5 in (1.96 m)	265 lb (120 kg)	November 22, 2024 (Committed) / December 4, 2024 (Signed)
Alex Payne #15 OT #162 nat.	Recruit ratings: Rivals: 247Sports: On3: ESPN:				
Aaron Dunn #17 OT #184 nat.	Spanish Fork, UT	Spanish Fork HS	6 ft 8 in (2.03 m)	288 lb (131 kg)	October 18, 2024 (Committed) / December 4, 2024 (Signed)
Aaron Dunn #17 OT #184 nat.	Recruit ratings: Rivals: 247Sports: On3: ESPN:				
Elijah Vaikona #41 OT #615 nat.	Rancho Santa Margarita, CA	Santa Margarita Catholic HS	6 ft 8 in (2.03 m)	370 lb (170 kg)	July 2, 2024 (Committed) / December 4, 2024 (Signed)
Elijah Vaikona #41 OT #615 nat.	Recruit ratings: Rivals: 247Sports: On3: ESPN:				
Willi Wascher #81 IOL #1044 nat.	Bellevue, WA	Bellevue HS	6 ft 3 in (1.91 m)	290 lb (130 kg)	April 12, 2024 (Committed) / December 4, 2024 (Signed)
Willi Wascher #81 IOL #1044 nat.	Recruit ratings: Rivals: 247Sports: On3: ESPN:				
Jahkeem Stewart #3 DL #16 nat.	New Orleans, LA	Edna Karr HS	6 ft 6 in (1.98 m)	290 lb (130 kg)	December 4, 2024 (Committed) / December 4, 2024 (Signed)
Jahkeem Stewart #3 DL #16 nat.	Recruit ratings: Rivals: 247Sports: On3: ESPN:				
Floyd Boucard #57 DL #562 nat.	Montreal, QC	Miami Central HS	6 ft 3 in (1.91 m)	315 lb (143 kg)	October 3, 2024 (Committed) / December 4, 2024 (Signed)
Floyd Boucard #57 DL #562 nat.	Recruit ratings: Rivals: 247Sports: On3: ESPN:				
Gus Cordova #66 DL #690 nat.	Austin, TX	Lake Travis HS	6 ft 4 in (1.93 m)	250 lb (110 kg)	March 25, 2024 (Committed) / December 4, 2024 (Signed)
Gus Cordova #66 DL #690 nat.	Recruit ratings: Rivals: 247Sports: On3: ESPN:				
Cash Jacobsen #110 DL #1094 nat.	Jenks, OK	Jenks HS	6 ft 3 in (1.91 m)	245 lb (111 kg)	November 17, 2024 (Committed) / December 4, 2024 (Signed)
Cash Jacobsen #110 DL #1094 nat.	Recruit ratings: Rivals: 247Sports: On3: ESPN:				
Jadyn Ramos #137 DE #1504 nat.	Conroe, TX	Conroe HS	6 ft 5 in (1.96 m)	240 lb (110 kg)	February 4, 2025 (Committed) / February 5, 2025 (Signed)
Jadyn Ramos #137 DE #1504 nat.	Recruit ratings: Rivals: 247Sports: On3:				
Matai Tagoa’i #7 LB #98 nat.	San Clemente, CA	San Clemente HS	6 ft 3 in (1.91 m)	200 lb (91 kg)	April 1, 2024 (Committed) / December 4, 2024 (Signed)
Matai Tagoa’i #7 LB #98 nat.	Recruit ratings: Rivals: 247Sports: On3: ESPN:				
AJ Tuitele #15 LB #147 nat.	North Las Vegas, NV	Mojave HS	6 ft 3 in (1.91 m)	205 lb (93 kg)	February 5, 2025 (Committed) / February 5, 2025 (Signed)
AJ Tuitele #15 LB #147 nat.	Recruit ratings: Rivals: 247Sports: On3: ESPN:				
RJ Sermons; CB	Rancho Cucamonga, CA	Rancho Cucamonga HS	6 ft 0 in (1.83 m)	180 lb (82 kg)	December 13, 2024 (Committed) / May 23, 2025 (Reclassfied)
RJ Sermons; CB	Recruit ratings: Rivals: 247Sports: On3: ESPN:				
Trestin Castro #26 CB #198 nat.	Upland, CA	Upland HS	6 ft 0 in (1.83 m)	170 lb (77 kg)	April 2, 2024 (Committed) / December 4, 2024 (Signed)
Trestin Castro #26 CB #198 nat.	Recruit ratings: Rivals: 247Sports: On3: ESPN:				
Alex Graham #45 CB #459 nat.	Detroit, MI	Cass Technical HS	6 ft 0 in (1.83 m)	185 lb (84 kg)	December 4, 2024 (Committed) / December 4, 2024 (Signed)
Alex Graham #45 CB #459 nat.	Recruit ratings: Rivals: 247Sports: On3: ESPN:				
Kendarius Reddick #22 S #263 nat.	Thomasville, GA	Thomas County Central HS	5 ft 11 in (1.80 m)	170 lb (77 kg)	August 2, 2024 (Committed) / December 4, 2024 (Signed)
Kendarius Reddick #22 S #263 nat.	Recruit ratings: Rivals: 247Sports: On3: ESPN:				
Stephen Miller #41 S #431 nat.	Greensboro, GA	Greene County HS	6 ft 2 in (1.88 m)	180 lb (82 kg)	October 14, 2024 (Committed) / December 4, 2024 (Signed)
Stephen Miller #41 S #431 nat.	Recruit ratings: Rivals: 247Sports: On3: ESPN:				
James Johnson #100 S #1076 nat.	Douglasville, GA	Douglas County HS	6 ft 0 in (1.83 m)	175 lb (79 kg)	August 30, 2024 (Committed) / December 4, 2024 (Signed)
James Johnson #100 S #1076 nat.	Recruit ratings: Rivals: 247Sports: On3: ESPN:				
Fisher Melton; TE	Ladera Ranch, CA	Santa Margarita Catholic HS	6 ft 5 in (1.96 m)	240 lb (110 kg)	May 5, 2025 (Committed) /
Fisher Melton; TE	Recruit ratings: No ratings found				
Will Weisberg; P	Los Angeles, CA	Notre Dame HS	6 ft 4 in (1.93 m)	190 lb (86 kg)	December 18, 2024 (Committed) /
Will Weisberg; P	Recruit ratings: No ratings found				
Luke Brown; LS	Waco, TX	Texas Wind HS	6 ft 2 in (1.88 m)	190 lb (86 kg)	January 31, 2025 (Committed) /
Luke Brown; LS	Recruit ratings: No ratings found				
Overall recruit ranking: 247Sports: 14th On3: 15th
Note: In many cases, Scout, Rivals, 247Sports, On3, and ESPN may conflict in their listings of height and weight.; In these cases, the average was taken. ESPN grades are on a 100-point scale.; Sources: "2025 USC Football Commitments". Rivals.; "2025 Team Ranking". Rivals.com.; "USC 2025 Football Commitments". 247Sports.

== Statistics ==
=== Team ===
	USC	Opp
Scoring
Total	210	80
Points per game	52.50	20.25
First downs
Total	104	79
Rushing	42	25
Passing	51	39
Penalty	11	15
Rushing
Total yards	1,009	371
Avg per play	7.1	3.0
Avg per game	252.3	92.8
Touchdowns	15	2
Passing
Total yards	1,326	924
Att-Comp-Int	111-81-0	135-81-6
Avg per pass	11.95	6.84
Avg per game	331.5	231.0
Touchdowns	10	8
Total offense
Total yards	2,335	1,295
Avg per play	9.2	5.0
Avg per game	583.8	323.8
Kicking
Punts-Yards	4-173	19-858
Avg per punt	43.25	45.16
Field goals-Attempts	7-8	4-5
Penalties
Total-Yards	31-308	18-174
Avg per game	77.0	43.5
Time of Possession
Total	02:02:54	01:57:06
Avg per game	30:44	29:16
Miscellaneous
3rd down conversions	23/41	19/54
4th down conversions	5/6	5/7
Fumbles-Lost	3-3	5-1
Sacks-Yards	16-95	2-14
PAT-Attempts	27-27	8-8
Red Zone Attempts-Score	24-23	10-6
Red Zone TD	17	4
Touchdowns scored	27	10
Attendance
Total	196,969	58,065
Games/Avg per game	3-65,656	1-58,065
Neutral Site	/	

=== Scoring ===
==== USC vs. non-conference opponents ====
	1	2	3	4	OT	Total
USC	35	38	28	31	0	132
Opponents	9	14	10	0	0	33

==== USC vs. B1G opponents ====
	1	2	3	4	OT	Total
USC	13	28	20	17	0	78
B1G opponents	7	6	21	14	0	48

==== USC vs. all opponents ====
	1	2	3	4	OT	Total
USC	48	66	48	48	0	210
Opponents	16	20	31	14	0	81

=== Individual Leaders ===
==== Offense ====
Passing statistics
#	NAME	POS	RAT	CMP	ATT	YDS	AVG/G	CMP%	TD	INT	LONG
4	Husan Longstreet	QB	166.35	13	15	103	51.50	86.6%	1	0	25
14	Jayden Maiava	QB	208.78	68	96	1,223	305.75	70.83%	9	0	74
	TOTALS	-	203.05	81	111	1,326	331.50	72.97%	10	0	74

Rushing statistics
#	NAME	POS	ATT	NET	AVG	TD	LONG	AVG/G
0	Eli Sanders	RB	39	250	6.4	2	20	62.50
2	Waymond Jordan	RB	57	443	7.8	3	40	110.75
21	Bryan Jackson	RB	5	11	2.2	1	6	11.0
25	Harry Dalton III	RB	3	24	8.0	0	21	24.0
30	King Miller	RB	11	152	13.8	2	75	50.67
41	Cian McKelvey	RB	1	4	4.0	0	4	4.0
4	Husan Longstreet	QB	9	60	6.7	2	17	30.0
14	Jayden Maiava	QB	15	55	3.7	4	15	13.75
6	Makai Lemon	WR	2	11	5.5	1	7	2.75
	Team	-	-	-	-	-	-	-
	TOTALS	-	143	1,009	7.1	15	75	252.25

Receiving statistics
#	NAME	POS	CTH	YDS	AVG	TD	LONG	AVG/G
0	Zacharyus Williams	WR	3	80	26.67	0	61	40.0
6	Makai Lemon	WR	24	438	18.25	3	74	109.5
8	Ja'Kobi Lane	WR	9	239	26.56	1	59	79.67
9	Jay Fair	WR	1	0	0.0	0	0	0.0
10	Corey Simms	WR	1	6	6.0	0	6	2.0
15	Jaden Richardson	WR	2	23	11.5	0	12	7.67
16	Tanook Hines	WR	7	62	8.86	1	25	15.50
17	Prince Strachan	WR	1	25	25.0	0	25	25.0
19	DJ Jordan	WR	5	38	7.60	0	14	12.67
18	Joey Olsen	TE	1	0	0.0	0	0	0.0
24	Carson Tabaracci	TE	1	9	9.0	1	9	3.0
85	Walker Lyons	TE	6	68	11.33	2	26	17.0
87	Lake McRee	TE	9	189	21.00	1	64	47.25
1	Eli Sanders	RB	6	105	17.5	1	73	26.25
2	Waymond Jordan	RB	4	37	9.25	0	20	9.25
21	Bryan Jackson	RB	1	0	0	0	0	0
30	King Miller	RB	1	7	7.0	0	7	2.33
	TOTALS	-	81	1,326	16.37	10	74	331.50

==== Defense ====
Defense statistics
#	NAME	POS	SOLO	AST	TOT	TFL-YDS	SACK-YDS	INT-YDS	BU	QBH	FR-YDS	FF	BLK	SAF	TD
0	Jamaal Jarrett	DT	1	2	3	0.5–2	–	1–70	–	–	–	–	–	–	1
4	Jahkeem Stewart	DT	5	1	6	4.0–9	–	–	–	1	–	–	–	–	–
8	Devan Thompkins	DT	3	8	11	2.0–9	1.0–6	–	1	1	–	–	–	–	–
9	Keeshawn Silver	DT	4	1	5	–	–	–	–	–	–	–	–	–	–
88	Floyd Boucard	DT	4	1	5	2.0–13	1.0–9	–	–	1	–	–	–	–	–
91	Brendan Cho	DT	–	1	1	–	–	–	–	–	–	–	–	–	–
92	Carlon Jones	DT	1	–	1	–	–	–	–	–	–	–	–	–	–
94	Kobe Pepe	DT	–	–	–	–	–	–	–	–	–	–	–	–	–
97	Jide Abasiri	DT	3	2	5	1.0–9	1.0–9	–	–	1	–	–	–	–	–
98	Cash Jacobsen	DT	–	–	–	–	–	–	–	–	–	–	–	–	–
1	Kameryn Crawford	DE	9	1	10	5.5–16	2.5–11	–	–	–	–	–	–	–	–
6	Anthony Lucas	DE	4	2	6	2.0–19	2.0–19	–	–	5	–	–	–	–	–
10	Braylan Shelby	DE	6	5	11	5.0–17	3.5–15	–	–	2	–	–	–	–	–
39	Garrett Pomerantz	DE	1	–	1	–	–	1–37	–	–	–	–	–	–	–
90	Gus Cordova	DE	1	–	1	–	–	–	–	–	–	–	–	–	–
95	Jadyn Ramos	DE	1	–	1	–	–	–	–	–	–	–	–	–	–
14	Ta’Mere Robinson	LB	3	2	5	1.0–4	–	–	–	–	–	–	–	–	–
15	Anthony Beavers Jr.	LB	1	1	2	–	–	–	–	–	–	–	–	–	–
18	Eric Gentry	LB	27	–	27	7.0–26	3.0–15	–	–	–	–	2	–	–	–
23	Desman Stephens II	LB	13	3	16	–	–	–	–	–	–	–	–	–	–
26	Elijah Newby	LB	4	1	5	–	–	–	–	–	–	–	–	–	–
29	Garrison Madden	LB	2	1	3	–	–	–	–	–	–	–	–	–	–
31	Jadyn Walker	LB	7	–	7	2.0–7	–	–	–	–	–	–	–	–	–
44	Matai Tagoa’i	LB	2	–	2	–	–	–	–	–	–	1	–	–	–
54	AJ Tuitele	LB	–	–	–	–	–	–	–	–	–	–	–	–	–
57	Roman Marchetti	LB	1	3	4	–	–	–	–	–	–	–	–	–	–
2	DJ Harvey	CB	3	2	5	–	–	–	–	–	–	–	–	–	–
16	Prophet Brown	CB	–	–	–	–	–	–	–	–	–	–	–	–	–
17	DeCarlos Nicholson	CB	4	2	6	–	–	1–0	–	–	–	–	–	–	–
21	Chasen Johnson	CB	1	–	1	–	–	–	–	–	–	–	–	–	–
22	Braylon Conley	CB	3	1	4	–	–	–	–	–	–	–	–	–	–
25	Marcelles Williams	CB	7	3	10	–	–	–	–	–	–	–	–	–	–
27	Alex Graham	CB	–	–	–	–	–	–	–	–	–	–	–	–	–
34	Kevin Longstreet	CB	3	–	3	–	–	–	2	–	–	–	–	–	–
35	James Johnson	CB	–	–	–	–	–	–	–	–	–	–	–	–	–
37	Trestin Castro	CB	1	–	1	–	–	–	–	–	–	–	–	–	–
40	Shawn Sehra	CB	2	–	2	–	–	–	–	–	–	–	–	–	–
42	RJ Sermons	CB	–	–	–	–	–	–	–	–	–	–	–	–	–
7	Kamari Ramsey	S	4	3	7	0.5–2	–	–	1	1	–	–	–	–	–
19	Bishop Fitzgerald	S	14	5	19	0.5–2	–	3–72	1	–	–	–	–	–	1
24	Christian Pierce	S	11	4	15	2.0–12	1.0–10	–	1	–	–	–	–	–	–
28	Kennedy Urlacher	S	3	–	3	1.0–1	1.0–1	–	–	–	–	–	–	–	–
30	Marquis Gallegos	S	3	1	4	2.0–7	–	–	–	–	–	–	–	–	–
36	Steve Miller	S	–	1	1	–	–	–	–	–	–	–	–	–	–
38	Isaiah Rubin	S	–	–	–	–	–	–	–	–	1–0	–	–	–	–
41	Kendarius Reddick	S	–	–	–	–	–	–	–	–	–	–	–	–	–
45	Brandon Shepherd	S	–	1	1	–	–	–	–	–	–	–	–	–	–
	TOTAL	-	162	58	220	38.0–155	16.0–95	6–179	6	12	1–0	3	–	–	2

Key: POS: Position, SOLO: Solo Tackles, AST: Assisted Tackles, TOT: Total Tackles, TFL: Tackles-for-loss, SACK: Quarterback Sacks, INT: Interceptions, BU: Passes Broken Up, PD: Passes Defended, QBH: Quarterback Hits, FR: Fumbles Recovered, FF: Forced Fumbles, BLK: Kicks or Punts Blocked, SAF: Safeties, TD : Touchdown

==== Special teams ====
Kicking statistics
#	NAME	POS	XPM	XPA	XP%	FGM	FGA	FG%	1–19	20–29	30–39	40–49	50+	LNG
48	Ryon Sayeri	K	25	25	100%	7	8	87.50%	1/1	3/3	2/3	1/1	0/0	48
93	William Weisberg	P/K	2	2	100%	0	0	0%	0/0	0/0	0/0	0/0	0/0	0
	TOTALS	-	27	27	100%	7	8	87.50%	1/1	3/3	2/3	1/1	0/0	48

Kickoff statistics
#	NAME	POS	KICKS	YDS	AVG	TB	OB
48	Ryon Sayeri	K	37	2,377	64.2	27	1
93	William Weisberg	P/K	1	65	65.0	0	0
	TOTALS	-	38	2,442	64.3	27	1

Punting statistics
#	NAME	POS	PUNTS	YDS	AVG	LONG	TB	I–20	50+	BLK
80	Sam Johnson	P	4	173	43.25	48	0	3	0	0
	TOTALS	-	4	173	43.25	48	0	3	0	0

Kick return statistics
#	NAME	POS	RTNS	YDS	AVG	TD	LNG
1	Eli Sanders	RET	2	33	16.5	0	19
6	Makai Lemon	RET	7	144	20.57	0	24
16	Tanook Hines	RET	1	6	6.0	0	6
	Team		0	0	0.0	0	0
	TOTALS	-	10	183	18.30	0	24

Punt return statistics
#	NAME	POS	RTNS	YDS	AVG	TD	LONG
6	Makai Lemon	RET	2	25	12.5	0	23
	TOTALS	-	2	25	12.5	0	23
