= Sam Huard =

American football player (born 2002)

No. 7 – USC Trojans
- Position: Quarterback
- Class: Redshirt Senior

Personal information
- Born: June 17, 2002 (age 24); Providence, Rhode Island, U.S.
- Listed height: 6 ft 1 in (1.85 m)
- Listed weight: 210 lb (95 kg)

Career information
- High school: Kennedy Catholic (Burien, Washington)
- College: Washington (2021–2022); Cal Poly (2023); Utah (2024); USC (2025)
- Stats at ESPN

Sam Huard (born June 17, 2002) is an American college football quarterback for the USC Trojans. He has previously played for the Washington Huskies, the Cal Poly Mustangs and the Utah Utes.

== Early life ==
Huard grew up in Bellevue, Washington and attended John F. Kennedy Catholic High School. He was named the MaxPreps National Freshman of the Year after passing for 3,432 yards and 34 touchdowns. Huard completed 248 of 395 passes for 4,141 yard with 42 touchdowns and 10 interceptions during his sophomore season. He completed 269 of 426 passes for 4,172 yards with 56 touchdowns and 11 interceptions as a junior and was named the Area Offensive Player of the Year by The Seattle Times and the 4A State Player of the Year by the Associated Press. Huard passes 1,473 yards and 21 touchdowns with no interceptions during his senior season, which was postponed from the fall to the spring of 2021 due to COVID-19. He also was invited to play in the 2021 All-American Bowl. Huard finished his high school career with a state record 13,214 passing yards and threw 153 touchdown passes.

Huard was initially rated a four-star recruit. He committed to play college football at Washington as a sophomore over offers from Boise State, California, Florida, Tennessee, and Washington State. Huard was re-rated as a five-star recruit during his senior year.

== College career ==
=== Washington ===
Huard entered his freshman season at Washington as the Huskies second-string quarterback behind Dylan Morris. He appeared in four games during the season, completing 22-for-42 pass attempts for 241 yards with one touchdown and four interceptions. Huard made his first career start in the Apple Cup rivalry game at the end of the 2021 season, completing 17-of-31 pass attempts for 190 yards and one touchdown with four interceptions in a 40-13 loss to Washington State. In 2022, Huard served as the third-string quarterback behind transfer Michael Penix Jr. and Morris. Following the end of the season, he entered the NCAA transfer portal.

=== Cal Poly ===
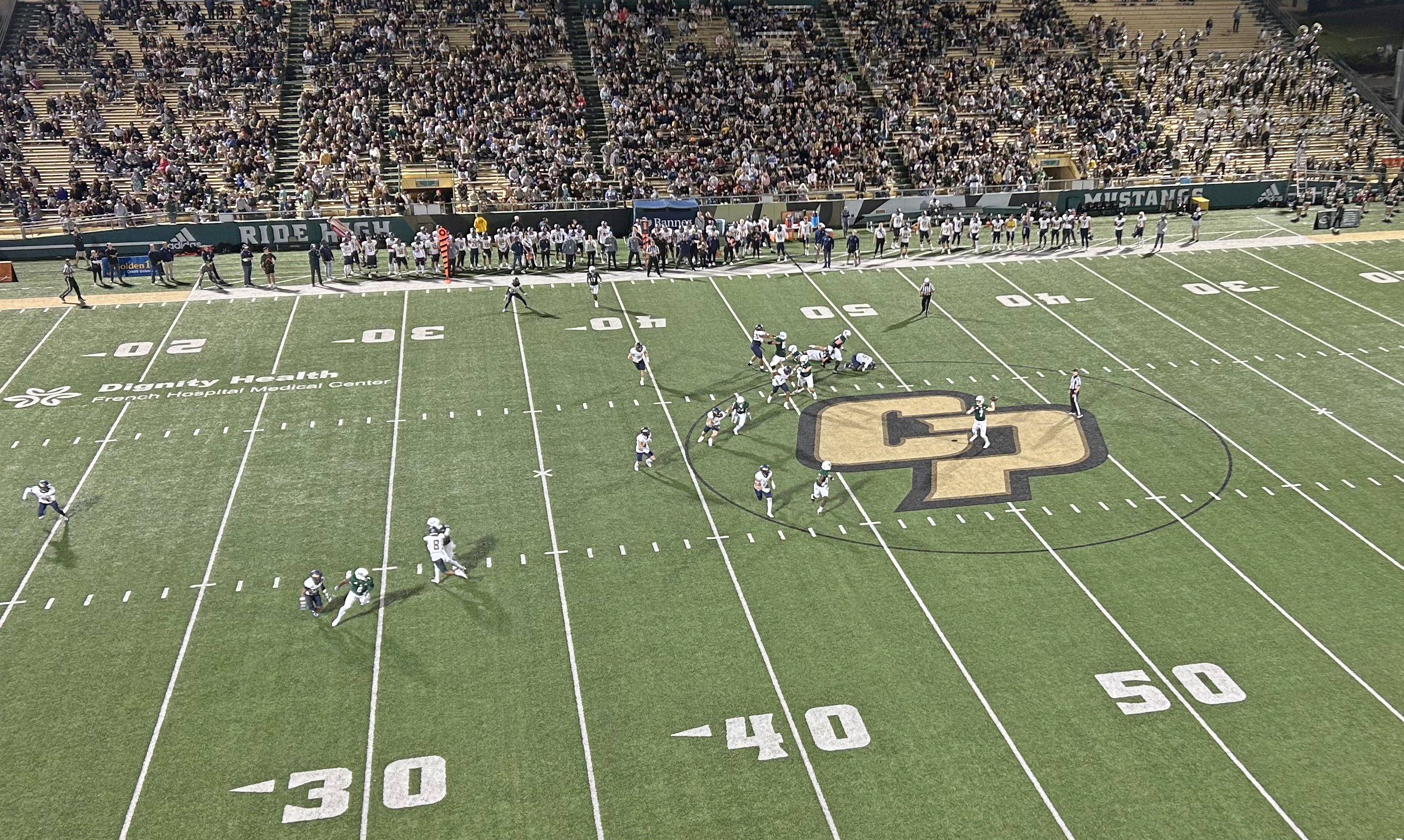
Cal Poly quarterback Sam Huard throws downfield during a win against Northern Colorado in the 2023 season.

Huard ultimately transferred to Cal Poly in San Luis Obispo. The transfer reunited him with his former head coach at Kennedy Catholic, Sheldon Cross, who had recently been hired as the Mustangs' offensive coordinator.

Huard opened the 2023 season as Cal Poly's starting quarterback. He played in 9 games for the Mustangs, totaling 2,205 yards, 18 touchdowns, and 10 interceptions.

=== Utah ===
On May 7, 2024, Huard transferred to the University of Utah. On November 1 of that year, Utah head coach Kyle Whittingham announced that Huard "had a surgery some time ago that has ended his season,” and never played for the Utes that season.

On December 8, 2024, Huard announced that he would enter the transfer portal for the third time.

=== USC ===
On January 6, 2025, Huard announced that he would transfer to USC. He began the 2025 season as the third-string quarterback behind Jayden Maiava and Husan Longstreet. Huard made his USC debut on the Trojans' final offensive drive against Missouri State in the season-opening 73–13 victory. In Week 9 against Northwestern, Huard, who had worn number 7 earlier in the season, was listed as number 80 to match starting punter Sam Johnson's number. In the second quarter of a tied game, Huard lined up as the punter and threw a 10-yard pass to Tanook Hines for a first down. The trick play gained national attention, with the Big Ten later saying USC should have been penalized for unsportsmanlike conduct.

=== Statistics ===
Season	Team	Games			Passing								Rushing			
Season	Team	GP	GS	Record	Cmp	Att	Pct	Yds	Avg	TD	INT	Rtg	Att	Yds	Avg	TD
2021	Washington	4	1	0–1	22	42	52.4	241	5.7	1	4	89.4	3	−32	−10.7	0
2022	Washington	1	0	—	2	2	100.0	24	12.0	0	0	200.8	1	−13	−13.0	0
2023	Cal Poly	9	9	3–6	185	304	60.9	2,205	7.3	18	10	134.7	19	−197	−5.1	0
2024	Utah	DNP														
2025	USC	2	0	—	1	1	100.0	10	10.0	0	0	0.0	0	0	0.0	0
2026	USC	0	0	0–0	0	0	0.0	0	0.0	0	0	0.0	0	0	0.0	0
Career		16	10	3–7	210	349	60.2	2,480	7.1	19	14	129.8	23	−142	−6.2	0

== Personal life ==
Huard is the son of former Washington and NFL quarterback Damon Huard. His uncle, Brock Huard, also played quarterback at Washington and in the NFL. Another uncle, Luke Huard, played quarterback at North Carolina and is currently a member of the USC Trojans coaching staff.
