= 2023 Cal Poly Mustangs football team =

American college football season

2023 Cal Poly Mustangs football
- Conference: Big Sky Conference
- Record: 3–8 (1–7 Big Sky)
- Head coach: Paul Wulff (1st season)
- Offensive coordinator: Sheldon Cross (1st season)
- Offensive scheme: Spread
- Co-defensive coordinators: Will Plemons (2nd season); Cody Von Appen (2nd season)
- Base defense: Multiple
- Home stadium: Mustang Memorial Field

2023 Big Sky Conference football standings
	Conf.			Overall
Team	W		L	W		L
No. 2 Montana $^	7	–	1	13	–	2
No. 8 Idaho ^	6	–	2	9	–	4
No. 9 Montana State ^	6	–	2	8	–	4
Northern Arizona	5	–	3	5	–	6
No. 24 UC Davis	5	–	3	7	–	4
No. 13 Sacramento State ^	4	–	4	8	–	5
Portland State	4	–	4	5	–	6
Weber State	4	–	4	6	–	5
Eastern Washington	3	–	5	4	–	7
Idaho State	3	–	5	3	–	8
Cal Poly	1	–	7	3	–	8
Northern Colorado	0	–	8	0	–	11
$ – Conference champion; ^ – FCS playoff participant; Rankings from STATS Poll

The 2023 Cal Poly Mustangs football team represented California Polytechnic State University, San Luis Obispo as member of the Big Sky Conference during the 2023 NCAA Division I FCS football season. Led first-year head coach Paul Wulff, the Mustangs compiled an overall record of 3–8 with a mark of 1–7 in conference play, placing 11th in the Big Sky. Cal poly played home games at Mustang Stadium in San Luis Obispo, California.

== Schedule ==
Date	Time	Opponent	Site	TV	Result	Attendance
September 2	3:00 p.m.	San Diego*	Mustang Memorial Field; San Luis Obispo, CA	ESPN+	W 27–10	6,248
September 9	1:00 p.m.	at San Jose State*	CEFCU Stadium; San Jose, CA	NBCSBA	L 3–59	14,224
September 16	5:05 p.m.	Lincoln (CA)*	Mustang Memorial Field; San Luis Obispo, CA	ESPN+	W 41–20	9,238
September 23	1:00 p.m.	at Portland State	Hillsboro Stadium; Hillsboro, OR	ESPN+	L 21–59	1,672
September 30	5:05 p.m.	No. 21 UC Davis^{†}	Mustang Memorial Field; San Luis Obispo, CA (Battle for the Golden Horseshoe)	ESPN+	L 13–31	8,744
October 7	5:05 p.m.	at No. 3 Idaho	Mustang Memorial Field; San Luis Obispo, CA	ESPN+	L 14–42	6,028
October 14	5:00 p.m.	at No. 2 Montana State	Bobcat Stadium; Bozeman, MT	ESPN+	L 19–59	21,997
October 21	5:05 p.m.	Northern Colorado	Mustang Memorial Field; San Luis Obispo, CA	ESPN+	W 24–17	9,263
November 4	1:00 p.m.	at Eastern Washington	Roos Field; Cheney, WA	ESPN+	L 13–48	4,345
November 11	2:00 p.m.	at No. 9 Sacramento State	Hornet Stadium; Sacramento, CA	ESPN+	L 30–41	12,022
November 18	5:05 p.m.	Weber State	Mustang Memorial Field; San Luis Obispo, CA	ESPN+	L 21–48	4,829
*Non-conference game; ^{†}Homecoming; Rankings from STATS Poll released prior to the game; All times are in Pacific time

== Preseason ==
=== Polls ===
On July 23, 2023, during the virtual Big Sky Kickoff, the Mustangs were predicted to finish eleventh in the Big Sky by both the coaches and media.

=== Preseason All–Big Sky team ===
The Mustangs had one player selected to the preseason all-Big Sky team.

Defense

David Meyer – LB

== Game summaries ==
=== At San Jose State ===
Cal Poly Mustangs (1–0) at San Jose State Spartans (0–2)

Quarter	1	2	3	4	Total
Mustangs	0	3	0	0	3
Spartans	17	21	21	0	59

at CEFCU Stadium, San Jose, CA

- Date: September 9, 2023
- Game time: 1:00 p.m. PST
- Game attendance: 14,224
- TV announcers (NBCSBA): Neal Ruhl, David Fales, Kate Rooney

Game information

First Quarter
Second Quarter
Third Quarter
Fourth Quarter

Statistics	CP	SJSU
First downs		
Total yards		
Rushing yards		
Passing yards		
Turnovers		
Time of possession		

Team	Category	Player	Statistics
Cal Poly	Passing		
Cal Poly	Rushing		
Cal Poly	Receiving		
SJSU	Passing		
SJSU	Rushing		
SJSU	Receiving		

=== No. 3 Idaho ===
No. 3 Idaho Vandals (4–1) at Cal Poly Mustangs (2–3) – Game summary

Quarter	1	2	3	4	Total
No. 3 Vandals	7	21	7	7	42
Mustangs	0	7	0	7	14

at Mustang Memorial Field • San Luis Obispo, CA

- Date: October 7, 2023
- Game time: 5:00 p.m. PDT
- Game attendance: 6,028
- TV announcers (ESPN+): Chris Sylvester, John Kane

=== At No. 9 Sacramento State ===
Cal Poly Mustangs (3–6) at No. 9 Sacramento State Hornets (6–3) – Game summary

Quarter	1	2	3	4	Total
Mustangs	10	13	7	0	30
No. 9 Hornets	14	17	7	3	41

at Hornet Stadium, Sacramento, CA

- Date: November 11, 2023
- Game time: 2:00 p.m. PST
- Game weather: 69 °F (21 °C) • NW 3 mph • Sunny
- Game attendance: 12,022
- Referee: Kelly Holman
- TV announcers (KMAX-TV/ESPN+): Play-by-Play: Jason Ross • Analysis: Darren Arbet

Game information

First Quarter

- (10:14) CP – Noah Serna 26-yard field goal (Drive: 8 plays, 64 yards, 4:43; Cal Poly 3–0)
- (7:55) SAC – Elijah Tau-Tolliver 34-yard run (Zach Schreiner kick) (Drive: 6 plays, 63 yards, 2:12; Sacramento State 7–3)
- (5:41) SAC – Devin Gandy 7-yard pass from Carson Conklin (Zach Schreiner kick) (Drive: 4 plays, 66 yards, 1:10; Sacramento State 14–3)
- (2:37) CP – Michael Briscoe 29-yard pass from Sam Huard (Noah Serna kick) (Drive: 7 plays, 75 yards, 3:04; Sacramento State 14–10)

Second Quarter

- (8:27) CP – Noah Serna 44-yard field goal (Drive: 11 plays, 58 yards, 4:17; Sacramento State 14–13)
- (6:27) SAC – Marshel Martin 39-yard pass from Carson Conklin (Zach Schreiner kick) (Drive: 4 plays, 54 yards, 1:38; Sacramento State 21–13)
- (2:27) SAC – Carlos Hill 15-yard pass from Carson Conklin (Zach Schreiner kick) (Drive: 5 plays, 75 yards, 2:10; Sacramento State 28–13)
- (1:39) CP – Michael Briscoe 52-yard pass from Sam Huard (Noah Serna kick) (Drive: 4 plays, 80 yards, 0:42; Sacramento State 28–20)
- (0:18) CP – Noah Serna 23-yard field goal (Drive: 9 plays, 78 yards, 0:52; Sacramento State 28–23)
- (0:00) SAC – Zach Schreiner 32-yard field goal (Drive: 2 plays, 47 yards, 0:12; Sacramento State 31–23)

Third Quarter

- (11:13) SAC – Elijah Tau-Tolliver 4-yard run (Zach Schreiner kick) (Drive: 1 play, 4 yards, 0:04; Sacramento State 38–23)
- (3:27) CP – Paul Holyfield Jr. 3-yard run (Noah Serna kick) (Drive: 8 plays, 69 yards, 4:04; Sacramento State 38–30)

Fourth Quarter

- (12:28) SAC – Zach Schreiner 22-yard field goal (Drive: 10 plays, 70 yards, 5:54; Sacramento State 41–30)

Line

- SAC –29.5

Over/Under

- 60.5

Statistics	CP	SAC
First downs	24	23
Total yards	539	538
Rushing yards	45	225
Passing yards	494	313
Passing: Comp–Att–Int	38–59–2	17–26–1
Time of possession	29:37	30:23

Team	Category	Player	Statistics
Cal Poly	Passing	Sam Huard	37/58, 483 yards, 2 TD, 2 INT
Cal Poly	Rushing	Paul Holyfield Jr.	7 carries, 27 yards, TD
Cal Poly	Receiving	Michael Briscoe	3 receptions, 124 yards, 2 TD
Sacramento State	Passing	Carson Conklin	17/26, 313 yards, 3 TD, INT
Sacramento State	Rushing	Marcus Fulcher	20 carries, 121 yards
Sacramento State	Receiving	Jared Gipson	5 receptions, 154 yards

== Roster ==
2023 Cal Poly Mustangs football team roster
Players
Coaches
Offense

Pos.	#	Name	Class
WR	0	Logan Booher	So
QB	1	Kahliq Paulette	So
WR	2	Giancarlo Woods	Jr
QB	3	Bo Kelly	Fr
RB	4	Mark Biggins	Sr
RB	5	Aiden Ramos	Fr
WR	6	Tyrece Fairly-Diyem	Fr
QB	7	Sam Huard	So
RB	8	Shakobe Harper	Sr
WR	9	Evan Burkhart	Jr
WR	10	Michael Briscoe	So
QB	11	Jaden Jones	So
WR	12	Makhi Johnson	Fr
QB	13	Spencer Brasch	Sr
QB	14	Dieter Barr	Fr
WR	15	Jake Woods	So
WR	16	Kian Salehi	Fr
WR	17	Bryson Allen	Sr
QB	18	Colby White	Fr
RB	19	Zion Hall	So
WR	20	Dominique Thompson	Sr
RB	21	Troy Fletcher	Fr
RB	22	Paul Holyfield Jr.	Fr
WR, DB	23	Budha Boyd	Fr
WR	24	Reed Shumpert	So
WR	25	Thomas Hartanov	Fr
WR	27	Ben Martin	So
WR	31	Nolan Cummings	Fr
RB	34	Kendric Sanders	Fr
WR	37	Colin Guenther	Fr
TE	40	Aidan Scott	Fr
WR	42	Zach Diebner	Fr
OL	52	Payson Campisano	Sr
OL	54	Hayden Jones	Fr
OL	55	Keith Marco	So
OL	56	Jake Trachtman	So
OL	57	Ava Leota	So
OL	58	Garrett Weichman	GS
OL	59	Tyler Charbonneau	So
OL	61	Ethan Bronson	Jr
OL	62	Hunter Jones	Sr
OL	65	Kavika Fitisemanu	Fr
OL	70	Jack Parra	Fr
OL	71	Charles Lincoln	Sr
OL	72	Austin Anderson	Jr
OL	73	Brady Norton	Fr
OL	74	Jasdev Banwait	Fr
OL	75	Tanner Hirschler	Fr
OL	76	Vatulele Finau	Sr
OL	77	Jayden Smith	Fr
OL	78	Racin Delgatty	Fr
OL	79	Miles Medina	Fr
TE	80	Carlton Brown	So
TE	81	Alex Grywalski	Fr
WR	82	Jordan Garrison	Fr
WR	83	Joey Villaroman	Fr
TE	84	DeMarcus Oandasan	Jr
WR	85	Eddy Schultz	Fr
WR	86	Dalton Bailey	So
WR	87	Brooks Wheatley	Fr
TE	88	Jace Yerty	Fr
TE	89	Tyler Hoffman	Fr

Defense

Pos.	#	Name	Class
S	0	Chris Snyder	Fr
CB	1	Delano Franklin	Fr
LB	2	Michael Otterstedt	So
LB	3	Ethan Calvert	So
DB	4	Kai Rapolla	Fr
LB	5	Je'kob Jones	So
CB	6	Xavier Oliphant	Jr
S	7	Jake East	Fr
S	8	DeMel Turner	Fr
S	9	Brian Dukes Jr.	So
LB	10	David Meyer	Jr
S	11	Dominic McCormack	Jr
CB	12	Donovan Saunders	So
CB	13	Kresean Kizzy	Fr
DL	14	Elijah Ponder	Jr
DE	15	Robbie Greer	Jr
LB	20	Kenny Olson	Fr
CB	22	Christian Middleton	So
DB	23	Budha Boyd	Fr
S	25	Jeremy Justice	Jr
CB	26	Tayden Phillips	Fr
S	27	Troy Bean	Fr
LB	28	Charlie Sullivan	Fr
CB	29	Jamauri Jackson	So
CB	30	Boston Wilson	Fr
S	32	Mason Rivera	So
LB	33	Grady Liddell	Jr
S	36	Thomas McNamara	So
LB	43	Judaea Moon	Sr
LB	44	Carson Jones	Fr
LB	47	Connor Heffler	Jr
LB	48	Drew Sulick	So
DL	49	Julius Jordan	Fr
LB	51	Reed Mercer	Jr
DL	53	Nilasoni Finau	Fr
DL	55	Zachary Denis	Fr
DL	58	Thomas Bouda	So
DL	60	Ethan Rodriguez	Jr
DL	64	Mason Barbour	So
DL	88	Jordan Sanders	Fr
DT	90	Marquise Jones	Fr
DE	91	Pasefika Salatielu	Fr
DL	92	Ian Don	Jr
DL	93	Su'e Luamanu	Fr
DL	94	Ish Taliauli	Fr
DL	95	Antonio Vakameilalo	Jr
DL	97	Elijah Satcher	So
DL	98	John Smolenski	Jr
DL	99	Josh Ngaluafe	Jr

Special teams

Pos.	#	Name	Class
P	35	Jesse Ehrlich	Fr
K	38	Noah Serna	Fr
LS	39	Cruz Rubio	Jr
K	41	Leo Valencia	Fr
P	46	Ryan Collins	So
LS	51	Reed Mercer	Jr
PK	63	Kevin Ryan	So
K	67	Jaden Ohlsen	Jr
LS	89	Tyler Hoffman	Fr

Head coach

- Paul Wulff

Coordinators/assistant coaches

- Sheldon Cross (Offensive Coordinator / Running backs)
- Erik Meyer (Passing Game coordinator / Quarterbacks)
- Casey Petree (Co-Special Teams coordinator / Tight ends)
- Ryan Payne (Run Game coordinator / Offensive line)
- Will Plemons (Co-Defensive coordinator / Defensive line)
- Josh Letuligasenoa (Defense)
- Cody vonAppen (Co-Defensive coordinator / Safeties)
- Asa Jackson (Wide receivers)
- Jake Casteel (Linebackers)
- Brandyn Thompson (Cornerbacks)

Legend

- (C) Team captain
- (S) Suspended
- (I) Ineligible
- Injured
- Redshirt

Roster
Last update: August 29, 2023
