= 2023 Northern Colorado Bears football team =

American college football season

2023 Northern Colorado Bears football
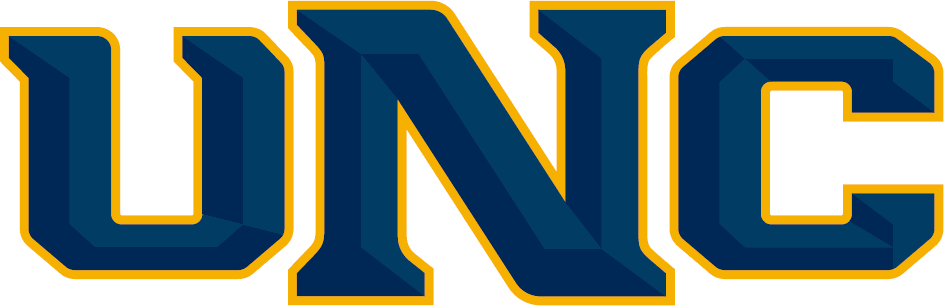
- Conference: Big Sky Conference
- Record: 0–11 (0–8 Big Sky)
- Head coach: Ed Lamb (1st season)
- Offensive coordinator: Blair Peterson (1st season)
- Defensive coordinator: Preston Hadley (1st season)
- Home stadium: Nottingham Field

2023 Big Sky Conference football standings
	Conf.			Overall
Team	W		L	W		L
No. 2 Montana $^	7	–	1	13	–	2
No. 8 Idaho ^	6	–	2	9	–	4
No. 9 Montana State ^	6	–	2	8	–	4
Northern Arizona	5	–	3	5	–	6
No. 24 UC Davis	5	–	3	7	–	4
No. 13 Sacramento State ^	4	–	4	8	–	5
Portland State	4	–	4	5	–	6
Weber State	4	–	4	6	–	5
Eastern Washington	3	–	5	4	–	7
Idaho State	3	–	5	3	–	8
Cal Poly	1	–	7	3	–	8
Northern Colorado	0	–	8	0	–	11
$ – Conference champion; ^ – FCS playoff participant; Rankings from STATS Poll

The 2023 Northern Colorado Bears football team represented the University of Northern Colorado as a member of the Big Sky Conference during the 2023 NCAA Division I FCS football season. They were led by first-year head coach Ed Lamb and played their home games at Nottingham Field.

== Preseason ==
=== Polls ===
On July 23, 2023, during the virtual Big Sky Kickoff, the Bears were predicted to finish tenth in the Big Sky by both the coaches and media.

== Schedule ==
Date	Time	Opponent	Site	TV	Result	Attendance
August 31	6:00 p.m.	at Abilene Christian*	Wildcat Stadium; Abilene, TX	ESPN+	L 11–31	6,164
September 9	2:00 p.m.	No. 10 Incarnate Word*	Nottingham Field; Greeley, CO	ESPN+	L 7–42	3,898
September 16	3:00 p.m.	at No. 23 (FBS) Washington State*	Martin Stadium; Pullman, WA	P12N	L 21–64	23,595
September 23	4:00 p.m.	at Idaho State	Holt Arena; Pocatello, ID	ESPN+	L 21–35	N/A
September 30	1:00 p.m.	No. 13 Weber State	Nottingham Field; Greeley, CO	ESPN+	L 21–28	3,375
October 14	1:00 p.m.	No. 4 Sacramento State^{†}	Nottingham Field; Greeley, CO	ESPN+	L 13–21	4,783
October 21	7:05 p.m.	at Cal Poly	Mustang Memorial Field; San Luis Obispo, CA	ESPN+	L 17–24	9,263
October 28	1:00 p.m.	at No. 7 Montana	Washington–Grizzly Stadium; Missoula, MT	ESPN+	L 0–40	25,463
November 4	1:00 p.m.	No. 3 Idaho	Nottingham Field; Greeley, CO	ESPN+	L 13–27	3,608
November 11	1:00 p.m.	at Northern Arizona	Walkup Skydome; Flagstaff, AZ	ESPN+	L 7–28	6,003
November 18	12:00 p.m.	Portland State	Nottingham Field; Greeley, CO	ESPN+	L 23–27	2,578
*Non-conference game; ^{†}Homecoming; Rankings from STATS Poll released prior to the game; All times are in Mountain time

== Game summaries ==
=== vs No. 10 Incarnate Word ===
Game Two – Incarnate Word Cardinals (0–1) at Northern Colorado Bears (0–1)

Quarter	1	2	3	4	Total
No. 10 Cardinals	7	14	14	7	42
Bears	0	0	0	7	7

at Nottingham Field, Greeley, CO

- Date: September 9
- Game time: 2:00 p.m.
- Game weather: Wind: NE 9 mph • Weather: Sunny
- Game attendance: 3,898
- Referee: Gregg Wilson
- TV announcers (ESPN+): Jason Alvine (play-by-play) and Nick Hager (analyst)
- Box Score

Game information

First Quarter

- UIW – 8:34 Marquez Perez 21 yard pass from Zach Calzada, Mason Lawler kick
  UIW 7–0 Drive: 3 plays, 40 yards, 0:41

Second Quarter

- UIW – 14:24 Caleb Chapman 1 yard pass from Zach Calzada, Mason Lawler kick
  UIW 14–0 Drive: 16 plays, 97 yards, 6:50
- UIW – 1:53 Timothy Carter 16 yard run, Mason Lawler kick
  UIW 21–0 Drive: 7 plays, 89 yards, 1:39

Third Quarter

- UIW – 9:22 Zach Calzada 11 yard run, Mason Lawler kick
  UIW 28–0 Drive: 9 plays, 60 yards, 3:18
- UIW – 5:10 Tre Siggers 11 yard run, Mason Lawler kick
  UIW 35–0 Drive: 6 plays, 67 yards, 2:05

Fourth Quarter

- UIW – 10:04 Caleb Chapman 25 yard pass from Zach Calzada, Mason Lawler kick
  UIW 42–0 Drive: 6 plays, 67 yards, 2:37
- UNC – 6:28 Blake Haggerty 43 yard pass from Hank Gibbs, Hunter Green kick
  UIW 42–7 Drive: 9 plays, 88 yards, 3:36

Statistics	UIW	UNC
First downs	29	14
Plays–yards	82–617	69–261
Rushes–yards	42–235	37–93
Passing yards	382	168
Passing: comp–att–int	29–40–1	15–32–1
Turnovers		
Time of possession	31:03	28:57

Team	Category	Player	Statistics
Incarnate Word	Passing	Zach Calzada	23/32, 255 yards, 3 TD, 1 INT
Incarnate Word	Rushing	Timothy Carter	16 carries, 85 yards, 1 TD
Incarnate Word	Receiving	Caleb Chapman	5 receptions, 116 yards, 2 TD
Northern Colorado	Passing	Jacob Sirmon	13/27, 114 yards, 1 INT
Northern Colorado	Rushing	David Afari	14 carries, 43 yards
Northern Colorado	Receiving	Blake Haggerty	4 receptions, 57 yards, 1 TD

=== at No. 23 (FBS) Washington State ===
Northern Colorado Bears (0–2) at No. 23 (FBS) Washington State Cougars (2–0) – Game summary

Quarter	1	2	3	4	Total
Bears	0	7	7	7	21
No. 23 (FBS) Cougars	22	21	14	7	64

at Martin Stadium • Pullman, WA

- Date: September 16, 2023
- Game time: 3:00 p.m.
- Game weather: Sunny • Temperature: 81 °F (27 °C) • Wind: SW 8 mph
- Game attendance: 23,595
- Referee: Gary Reed
- TV announcers (P12N): Matt Chazanow, Michael Bumpus

Game information

First quarter

- (10:28) WSU – Cameron Ward 8-yard run, Billy Riviere pass (Drive: 10 plays, 75 yards, 4:32; Washington State 8–0)
- (6:08) WSU – Kyle Williams 37-yard pass from Cameron Ward, Dean Janikowski kick (Drive: 6 plays, 70 yards, 3:23; Washington State 15–0)
- (3:41) WSU – Lincoln Victor 28-yard pass from Cameron Ward, Dean Janikowski kick (Drive: 4 plays, 64 yards, 1:07; Washington State 22–0)

Second quarter

- (12:27) WSU – Josh Kelly 18-yard pass from Cameron Ward, Dean Janikowski kick (Drive: 7 plays, 70 yards, 2:33; Washington State 29–0)
- (8:45) WSU – Nakia Watson 6-yard run, Dean Janikowski kick (Drive: 7 plays, 64 yards, 1:40; Washington State 36–0)
- (3:20) WSU – Lincoln Victor 31-yard pass from Cameron Ward, Dean Janikowski kick (Drive: 7 plays, 74 yards, 2:31; Washington State 43–0)
- (0:12) NCU – Jamarii Robinson 18-yard pass from Jacob Sirmon, Hunter Green kick (Drive: 8 plays, 75 yards, 3:08; Washington State 43–7)

Third quarter

- (9:43) WSU – Josh Meredith 15-yard pass from John Mateer, Dean Janikowski kick (Drive: 7 plays, 93 yards, 2:38; Washington State 50–7)
- (5:45) NCU – Hank Gibbs 1-yard run, Hunter Green kick (Drive: 7 plays, 75 yards, 3:58; Washington State 50–14)
- (5:10) WSU – Tsion Nunnally 72-yard pass from John Mateer, Dean Janikowski kick (Drive: 2 plays, 75 yards, 0:30; Washington State 57–14)

Fourth quarter

- (13:46) WSU – Dylan Paine 1-yard run, Dean Janikowski kick (Drive: 10 plays, 80 yards, 4:04; Washington State 64–14)
- (11:36) NCU – Darius Stewart 52-yard pass from Jacob Sirmon, Hunter Green kick (Drive: 5 plays, 75 yards, 2:10; Washington State 64–21)

Statistics	NCU	WSU
First downs	17	33
Total yards	366	718
Rushes/yards	31–158	36–229
Passing yards	208	489
Passing: Comp–Att–Int	18–30–0	29–38–1
Time of possession	29:11	30:49

Team	Category	Player	Statistics
Northern Colorado	Passing	Jacob Sirmon	16/24, 171 yards, 2 TD
Northern Colorado	Rushing	David Afari	17 carries, 116 yards
Northern Colorado	Receiving	Blake Haggerty	6 receptions, 70 yards
Washington State	Passing	Cam Ward	20/26, 327 yards, 4 TD
Washington State	Rushing	Dylan Paine	7 carries, 71 yards, TD
Washington State	Receiving	Lincoln Victor	6 receptions, 119 yards, 2 TD

=== at Idaho State ===
Idaho State Bengals (0–3) vs. Northern Colorado Bears (0–3) – Game summary

Quarter	1	2	3	4	Total
Bears	7	0	14	0	21
Bengals	7	14	7	7	35

at Holt Arena, Pocatello, Idaho

- Date: September 23
- Game time: 4:00 p.m. MDT
- Game weather: 70 °F (21 °C), Indoors
- Game attendance: 8,012
- Referee: Jim C.
- TV announcers (ESPN+): Dylan Carder (play-by-play), Kody Graves (analyst)
- Spread: Idaho State –6.5 • Odds to win: Northern Colorado 51.7% •

Game information

First quarter

- 7:04 UNC – Darius Stewart 16-yard run (Hunter Green kick) – Northern Colorado 7–0, Drive: 9 plays, 83 yards, 4:37
- 0:07 ISU – Alfred Jordan Jr. 32-yard pass from Jordan Cooke (Thomas Kopcho kick) – Tied 7–7, Drive: 7 plays, 74 yards, 2:37

Second quarter

- 5:31 ISU – Jordan Cooke 1-yard run (Thomas Kopcho kick) – Idaho State 14–7, Drive: 10 plays, 72 yards, 4:25
- 0:20 ISU – Chedon James 1-yard pass from Hunter Hays (Thomas Kopcho kick) – Idaho State 21–7, Drive: 7 plays, 62 yards, 1:14

Third quarter

- 10:32 UNC – Jacob Sirmon 1–yard run (Hunter Green kick) – Idaho State 21–14, Drive: 9 plays, 63 yards, 4:22
- 5:09 UNC – David Afari 18–yard run (Hunter Green kick) – Tied 21–21, Drive: 9 plays, 73 yards, 4:00
- 2:45 ISU – Aiden Taylor 8–yard run (Thomas Kopcho kick) – Idaho State 28–21, Drive: 6 plays, 75 yards, 2:24

Fourth quarter

- 5:05 ISU – Hunter Hays 2–yard run (Thomas Kopcho kick) – Idaho State 35–21, Drive: 12 plays, 58 yards, 5:56

Statistics	Northern Colorado	Idaho State
First downs	25	26
Plays–yards	72–365	72–429
Rushes–yards	40–242	30–103
Passing yards	123	326
Passing: comp–att–int	22–32–2	26–42–1
Turnovers	3	1
Time of possession	31:13	28:47

Team	Category	Player	Statistics
Northern Colorado	Passing	Jacob Sirmon	22/32, 123 yards, 2 INT
Northern Colorado	Rushing	Darius Stewart	14 carries, 124 yards, 1 TD
Northern Colorado	Receiving	Ty Arrington	5 receptions, 42 yards
Idaho State	Passing	Jordan Cooke	14/23, 218 yards, 1 TD, 1 INT
Idaho State	Rushing	Hunter Hays	13 carries, 55 yards, 1 TD
Idaho State	Receiving	Christian Fredericksen	7 receptions, 108 yards

=== vs No. 4 Sacramento State ===
No. 4 Sacramento State Hornets (4–1) at Northern Colorado Bears (0–5) – Game summary

Quarter	1	2	3	4	Total
No. 4 Hornets	14	0	7	0	21
Bears	3	7	0	3	13

at Nottingham Field, Greeley, CO

- Date: October 14, 2023
- Game time: 1:00 p.m. MST
- Game weather: Sunny
- Game attendance: 4,783
- Referee: Jim Crowley
- TV announcers (ESPN+): Play-by-Play: Jason Alvine • Analysis: Nick Hager

Game information

First Quarter

- (12:19) UNC – Hunter Green 39-yard field goal (Drive: 4 plays, 1 yard, 0:50; Northern Colorado 3–0)
- (8:44) SAC – Devin Gandy 15-yard pass from Kaiden Bennett (Zach Schreiner kick) (Drive: 9 plays, 75 yards, 3:35; Sacramento State 7–3)
- (0:34) SAC – Ezra Moleni 8-yard pass from Kaiden Bennett (Zach Schreiner kick) (Drive: 9 plays, 53 yards, 3:56; Sacramento State 14–3)

Second Quarter

- (7:47) UNC – Brayden Munroe 41-yard pass from Jacob Sirmon (Hunter Green kick) (Drive: 5 plays, 92 yards, 2:29; Sacramento State 14–10)

Third Quarter

- (0:00) SAC – Carlos Hill 20-yard pass from Kaiden Bennett (Zach Schreiner kick) (Drive: 11 plays, 70 yards, 4:41; Sacramento State 21–10)

Fourth Quarter

- (8:31) UNC – Hunter Green 19-yard field goal (Drive: 14 plays, 73 yards, 3:50; Sacramento State 21–13)

Line

- SAC –25.0

Over/Under

- 58.5

Statistics	SAC	UNC
First downs	23	17
Total yards	334	332
Rushing yards	151	75
Passing yards	183	257
Passing: Comp–Att–Int	25–31–0	20–39–0
Time of possession	30:57	29:03

Team	Category	Player	Statistics
Sacramento State	Passing	Kaiden Bennett	25/31, 183 yards, 3 TD
Sacramento State	Rushing	Ezra Moleni	16 carries, 93 yards
Sacramento State	Receiving	Marshel Martin	7 receptions, 52 yards
Northern Colorado	Passing	Jacob Sirmon	20/39, 257 yards, TD
Northern Colorado	Rushing	David Afari	10 carries, 36 yards
Northern Colorado	Receiving	Brayden Munroe	3 receptions, 66 yards, TD

=== at No. 7 Montana ===
	1	2	3	4	Total
Bears	0	0	0	0	0
No. 7 Grizzles	0	14	12	14	40

=== vs No. 3 Idaho ===
No. 3 Idaho Vandals (6–2) at Northern Colorado Bears (0–8) – Game summary

Quarter	1	2	3	4	Total
No. 3 Vandals	3	7	7	10	27
Bears	0	7	0	6	13

at Nottingham Field • Greeley, CO

- Date: November 4, 2023
- Game time: 1:00 p.m. MDT
- Game attendance: 3,608
- TV announcers (ESPN+): Jason Alvine, Nick Hager
