= 2023 UC Davis Aggies football team =

American college football season

2023 UC Davis Aggies football
- Conference: Big Sky Conference

Ranking
- STATS: No. 24
- Record: 7–4 (5–3 Big Sky)
- Head coach: Dan Hawkins (7th season)
- Offensive coordinator: Mike Cody (1st season)
- Defensive coordinator: Matt Coombs (4th season)
- Captain: Teddy Buchanan
- Home stadium: UC Davis Health Stadium

2023 Big Sky Conference football standings
	Conf.			Overall
Team	W		L	W		L
No. 2 Montana $^	7	–	1	13	–	2
No. 8 Idaho ^	6	–	2	9	–	4
No. 9 Montana State ^	6	–	2	8	–	4
Northern Arizona	5	–	3	5	–	6
No. 24 UC Davis	5	–	3	7	–	4
No. 13 Sacramento State ^	4	–	4	8	–	5
Portland State	4	–	4	5	–	6
Weber State	4	–	4	6	–	5
Eastern Washington	3	–	5	4	–	7
Idaho State	3	–	5	3	–	8
Cal Poly	1	–	7	3	–	8
Northern Colorado	0	–	8	0	–	11
$ – Conference champion; ^ – FCS playoff participant; Rankings from STATS Poll

The 2023 UC Davis football team represented the University of California, Davis as a member of the Big Sky Conference during the 2023 NCAA Division I FCS football season. Led by seventh-year head coach Dan Hawkins, the Aggies played their home games at UC Davis Health Stadium in Davis, California. The UC Davis Aggies football team drew an average home attendance of 10,562 in 2023.

== Preseason ==
=== Polls ===
On July 23, 2023, during the virtual Big Sky Kickoff, the Aggies were predicted to finish second in the Big Sky by the coaches and fifth by the media.

== Schedule ==
Date	Time	Opponent	Rank	Site	TV	Result	Attendance
August 31	5:00 p.m.	at Texas A&M–Commerce*	No. 16	Ernest Hawkins Field at Memorial Stadium; Commerce, TX	ESPN+	W 48–10	4,227
September 9	6:00 p.m.	at No. 16 (FBS) Oregon State*	No. 15	Reser Stadium; Corvallis, OR	P12N	L 7–55	35,728
September 16	7:00 p.m.	Southern Utah*	No. 16	UC Davis Health Stadium; Davis, CA	ESPN+	W 23–21	7,942
September 23	7:00 p.m.	Eastern Washington	No. 15	UC Davis Health Stadium; Davis, CA	ESPN+	L 24–27	14,724
September 30	5:00 p.m.	at Cal Poly	No. 21	Alex G. Spanos Stadium; San Luis Obispo, CA (Battle for the Golden Horseshoe)	ESPN+	W 31–13	8,744
October 7	4:00 p.m.	No. 17 Montana^{†}	No. 20	UC Davis Health Stadium; Davis, CA	ESPN+	L 23–31	9,576
October 14	5:00 p.m.	at No. 22 Weber State		Stewart Stadium; Ogden, UT	ESPN+	W 17–16	7,121
October 28	1:00 p.m.	at Northern Arizona	No. 25	Walkup Skydome; Flagstaff, AZ	ESPN+	L 21–38	6,931
November 4	4:00 p.m.	Portland State		UC Davis Health Stadium; Davis, CA	ESPN+	W 37–23	8,945
November 11	3:00 p.m.	at Idaho State		Holt Arena; Pocatello, ID	ESPN+	W 21–14	7,001
November 18	2:00 p.m.	No. 8 Sacramento State		UC Davis Health Stadium; Davis, CA (Causeway Classic)	ESPN+	W 31–21	11,622
*Non-conference game; ^{†}Homecoming; Rankings from STATS Poll released prior to the game; All times are in Pacific time

== Game summaries ==
=== at No. 16 Oregon State (FBS) ===
No. 16 Oregon State Beavers (1-0) vs No. 15 (FCS) UC Davis Aggies (1-0) – Game summary

Quarter	1	2	3	4	Total
No. 15 Aggies	0	0	0	7	7
No. 16 (FBS) Beavers	14	24	10	7	55

at Reser Stadium • Corvallis, Oregon

- Date: September 9
- Game time: 9:00 p.m. EST/6:00 p.m. PST
- Game weather: Clear, 79 °F (26 °C)
- Game attendance: 35,728
- Referee: Justin Elliott
- TV announcers (P12N): Roxy Bernstein (play-by-play), Lincoln Kennedy (analyst)
- Spread: Oregon State –24.0 • Odds to win: •

Game information

First quarter

- (12:09) OSU – Damien Martinez 64 Yd Run, Atticus Sappington Kick (Drive: 1 play, 64 yards, 0:10; Oregon State 7–0)
- (3:57) OSU – DJ Uiagalelei 3 Yd Run, Atticus Sappington Kick (Drive: 4 plays, 48 yards, 1:55; Oregon State 14–0)

Second quarter

- (14:54) OSU – Rweha Munyagi Jr. 5 Yd pass from DJ Uiagalelei, Atticus Sappington Kick (Drive: 6 plays, 59 yards, 2:11; Oregon State 21–0)
- (12:29) OSU – Silas Bolden 65 Yd Punt Return, Atticus Sappington Kick (Drive: 3 plays, 1 yard, 2:25; Oregon State 28–0)
- (5:30) OSU – Silas Bolden 22 Yd pass from DJ Uiagalelei, Atticus Sappington Kick (Drive: 9 plays, 70 yards, 4:28; Oregon State 35–0)
- (2:09) OSU – Atticus Sappington 40 Yd Field Goal (Drive: 4 plays, 7 yards, 2:03; Oregon State 38–0)

Third quarter

- (12:00) OSU – Atticus Sappington 40 Yd Field Goal (Drive: 7 plays, 30 yards, 2:47; Oregon State 41–0)
- (3:53) OSU – Riley Sharp 10 Yd pass from Aidan Chiles, Atticus Sappington Kick (Drive: 9 plays, 86 yards, 4:59; Oregon State 48–0)

Fourth quarter

- (9:41) OSU – Aidan Chiles 1 Yd Run, Atticus Sappington Kick (Drive: 14 plays, 89 yards, 7:07; Oregon State 55–0)
- (5:06) UCD – C.J. Hutton 9 Yd pass from Grant Harper, Hunter Ridley Kick (Drive: 10 plays, 75 yards, 4:35; Oregon State 55–7)

Statistics	UCD	OSU
First downs	12	23
Plays–yards	59–166	63–450
Rushes–yards	29–47	37–269
Passing yards	199	181
Passing: comp–att–int	17–30–1	17–26–0
Time of possession	28:16	31:44

Team	Category	Player	Statistics
UC Davis	Passing	Grant Harper	4/7, 56 yards, TD
UC Davis	Rushing	Lan Larison	15 carries, 55 yards
UC Davis	Receiving	Andre Crump Jr.	2 receptions, 42 yards
No. 16 Oregon State	Passing	DJ Uiagalelei	8/13, 107 yards, 2 TD
No. 16 Oregon State	Rushing	Damien Martinez	7 carries, 104 yards, TD
No. 16 Oregon State	Receiving	Silas Bolden	4 receptions, 65 yards, TD

=== Eastern Washington ===
UC Davis Aggies (2–1) vs Eastern Washington Eagles (1–2)

Quarter	1	2	3	4	Total
Aggies	0	0	0	0	0
Eagles	0	0	0	0	0

at UC Davis Health Stadium • Davis, CA

- Date: Saturday, September 23, 2023
- Game time: 10:00 p.m. PDT
- Game weather: • Temperature: • Wind:
- Game attendance: 14,724
- TV announcers (ESPN+): Scott Marsh, Scott Gordon

=== at Idaho State ===
UC Davis Aggies (5–4) vs Idaho State Bengals (3–6) – Game summary

Quarter	1	2	3	4	Total
Aggies	0	7	7	7	21
Bengals	7	0	7	0	14

at Holt Arena • Pocatello, Idaho

- Date: November 11
- Game time: 4:00 p.m. MST
- Game weather: None (indoor stadium)
- Game attendance: 7,001
- Referee: John Doe
- TV announcers (ESPN+): Dylan Carder (play-by-play) and Kody Graves (analyst)
- Box score, Recap

Game information

First quarter

- (2:19) IDST – Christian Fredericksen 7-yard pass from Hunter Hays, Thomas Kopcho kick (Drive: 12 plays, 95 yards, 5:36; Idaho State 7–0)

Second quarter

- (9:47) UCD – Lan Larison 3-yard run, Hunter Ridley kick (Drive: 8 plays, 87 yards, 4:33; Tied 7–7)

Third quarter

- (8:22) IDST – Chedon James 5-yard pass from Jordan Cooke, Thomas Kopcho kick (Drive: 5 plays, 49 yards, 1:52; Idaho State 14–7)
- (1:05) UCD – Lan Larison 12-yard run, Hunter Ridley kick (Drive: 2 plays, 17 yards, 0:48; Tied 14–14)

Fourth quarter

- (2:05) UCD – Lan Larison 23-yard run, Hunter Ridley kick (Drive: 10 plays, 92 yards, 5:18; UC Davis 21–14)

Statistics	UCD	IDST
First downs	17	19
Plays–yards	61–394	80–410
Rushes–yards	37–268	24–77
Passing yards	126	333
Passing: comp–att–int	14–24–1	33–56–2
Time of possession	32:11	27:49

Team	Category	Player	Statistics
UC Davis	Passing	Miles Hastings	14/23, 126 yards, 1 INT
UC Davis	Rushing	Lan Larison	31 carries, 264 yards, 3 TD
UC Davis	Receiving	Samuel Gbatu Jr.	4 receptions, 62 yards
Idaho State	Passing	Jordan Cooke	27/46, 297 yards, 1 TD, 2 INT
Idaho State	Rushing	Soujah Gasu	6 carries, 55 yards
Idaho State	Receiving	Chedon James	13 receptions, 108 yards, 1 TD

=== Sacramento State ===
No. 8 Sacramento State Hornets (7–3) at UC Davis Aggies (6–4) – Game summary

Quarter	1	2	3	4	Total
No. 8 Hornets	0	0	7	14	21
Aggies	14	3	0	14	31

at UC Davis Health Stadium, Davis, CA

- Date: November 18, 2023
- Game time: 12:00 p.m. PST
- Game weather: Sunny
- Game attendance: 11,622
- Referee: Jeff Reid
- TV announcers (ESPN+): Play-by-Play: Scott Marsh • Analysis: Scott Gordon

Game information

First Quarter

- (10:00) UCD – Lan Larison 3-yard run (Hunter Ridley kick) (Drive: 10 plays, 75 yards, 5:00; UC Davis 7–0)
- (0:46) UCD – Lan Larison 7-yard run (Hunter Ridley kick) (Drive: 6 plays, 50 yards, 3:54; UC Davis 14–0)

Second Quarter

- (8:27) UCD – Hunter Ridley 42-yard field goal (Drive: 9 plays, 40 yards, 3:58; UC Davis 17–0)

Third Quarter

- (0:55) SAC – Anderson Grover 16-yard pass from Kaiden Bennett (Zach Schreiner kick) (Drive: 6 plays, 74 yards, 1:55; UC Davis 17–7)

Fourth Quarter

- (9:54) UCD – Lan Larison 47-yard pass from Miles Hastings (Hunter Ridley kick) (Drive: 5 plays, 68 yards, 2:58; UC Davis 24–7)
- (5:46) SAC – Jared Gipson 14-yard pass from Kaiden Bennett (Zach Schreiner kick) (Drive: 10 plays, 73 yards, 4:07; UC Davis 24–14)
- (3:30) UCD – Lan Larison 12-yard run (Hunter Ridley kick) (Drive: 2 plays, 18 yards, 0:53; UC Davis 31–14)
- (2:26) SAC – Carlos Hill 35-yard pass from Kaiden Bennett (Zach Schreiner kick) (Drive: 4 plays, 55 yards, 0:57; UC Davis 31–21)

Line

- UCD –2.0

Over/Under

- 53.5

Statistics	SAC	UCD
First downs	22	17
Total yards	388	308
Rushing yards	27	133
Passing yards	361	175
Passing: Comp–Att–Int	32–53–2	16–23–0
Time of possession	28:07	31:53

Team	Category	Player	Statistics
Sacramento State	Passing	Kaiden Bennett	19/28, 232 yards, 3 TD, INT
Sacramento State	Rushing	Marcus Fulcher	10 carries, 23 yards
Sacramento State	Receiving	Carlos Hill	10 receptions, 144 yards, TD
UC Davis	Passing	Miles Hastings	16/23, 175 yards, TD
UC Davis	Rushing	Lan Larison	28 carries, 121 yards, 3 TD
UC Davis	Receiving	Lan Larison	3 receptions, 54 yards, TD
