= Luke Huard =

American football player and coach (born 1979)

Current position
- Title: Offensive coordinator, quarterbacks coach
- Team: USC
- Conference: Big Ten

Biographical details
- Born: October 1, 1979 (age 47); Redmond, Washington, U.S.
- Education: University of North Carolina (2002)

Playing career
- 1998–2000: North Carolina
- Position: Quarterback

Coaching career (HC unless noted)
- 2002: Washington HS (WA) (OC/QB)
- 2003–2006: Interlake HS (WA)
- 2007–2008: Washington (GA)
- 2009: Illinois State (QB)
- 2010–2012: Illinois State (OC)
- 2013–2016: Georgia State (OC/QB)
- 2017–2018: Sacramento State (co-OC/QB)
- 2019–2021: Texas A&M (OA)
- 2022–2023: USC (IWR)
- 2024: USC (QB)
- 2025–present: USC (OC/QB)

Michael Lucas Huard (born October 1, 1979) is an American football coach who is the offensive coordinator and quarterbacks coach for the University of Southern California Trojans.

== Playing career ==
Born in Redmond, Washington, Huard grew up in a football-centric family. His father, Mike Huard, was the head coach at Puyallup High School in Puyallup, Washington southeast of Tacoma. Luke played quarterback at Puyallup. His senior year, he led the team to a 12–1 record and a berth in the state 4-A semifinals, earning honors including Washington's Gatorade Player of the Year and honorable mention All-America.

Luke Huard played college football at North Carolina from 1999 to 2000. As a redshirt freshman in 1999, he appeared in seven games, starting four and completed 29 of 75 passes for 256 yards and a touchdown. His playing career was curtailed by a shoulder injury sustained during the season.

== Coaching career ==
Huard began his coaching career as the offensive coordinator and quarterbacks coach at Washington High School in Parkland, Washington in 2002. He was the head coach for four seasons at Interlake High School in Bellevue, Washington, where he led the program to its first winning season in 10 years in 2004. Huard joined the Washington Huskies as a graduate assistant from 2007 to 2008, working primarily with quarterbacks including Jake Locker, future quarterback for the Tennessee Titans in the National Football League (NFL).

In 2009, Huard became the quarterbacks coach at Illinois State in Normal, Illinois and was promoted to offensive coordinator in 2010. Under his guidance, the Redbirds led the Missouri Valley Football Conference in passing and total offense in 2012, averaging over 30 points per game and advancing to the FCS quarterfinals. Huard served as the offensive coordinator and quarterbacks coach at Georgia State from 2013 to 2016. During his tenure, quarterback Nick Arbuckle set multiple school and conference records, including 4,368 passing yards in 2015, earning Sun Belt Conference Student-Athlete of the Year honors.

From 2017 to 2018, Huard held the position of co-offensive coordinator and quarterbacks coach at Sacramento State in Sacramento, California. He joined Texas A&M in College Station as an offensive analyst from 2019 to 2021, contributing to the development of the Aggies' offensive strategies.

=== USC ===
In 2022, Huard was hired by the University of Southern California in Los Angeles as an offensive analyst. After the passing of inside receivers coach Dave Nichol, Huard was promoted to fill the role. He coached the inside receivers through the 2023 season, mentoring players including Tahj Washington who plays for the Miami Dolphins in the NFL and Zachariah Branch, who transferred to the University of Georgia in Athens and plays football there with his older brother Zion. In 2024, Huard transitioned to quarterbacks coach, overseeing the development of quarterbacks Miller Moss and Jayden Maiava. Under his guidance, the Trojans' offense have ranked in the national top 25 in multiple categories, including passing offense and total offense.

In February 2025, Huard was promoted to offensive coordinator while retaining his role as quarterbacks coach. Although head coach Lincoln Riley continues to call plays, Huard's expanded responsibilities include helping with game planning and overseeing the offense.

== Personal life ==
Huard family is deeply rooted in football. His older brothers, Damon and Brock Huard, were standout quarterbacks at the University of Washington and both played in the NFL. Their father, Mike Huard, coached all three brothers at Puyallup High School. Luke's nephew, Sam Huard is a quarterback at USC.

Luke Huard is married to Dolly Tan and they have two daughters.
