= Husan Longstreet =

American football player

No. 8 – LSU Tigers
- Position: Quarterback
- Class: Redshirt Freshman

Personal information
- Listed height: 6 ft 1 in (1.85 m)
- Listed weight: 195 lb (88 kg)

Career information
- High school: Centennial (Corona, California)
- College: USC (2025); LSU (2026–present)
- Stats at ESPN

Husan Longstreet is an American college football quarterback for the LSU Tigers. He previously played for the USC Trojans.

== Early life ==
Longstreet originally attended Inglewood High School in Inglewood, California his freshman and sophomore years before transferring to Centennial High School in Corona, California. As a sophomore at Inglewood in 2022, he was the Daily Breeze All-Area Football Player of the Year after passing for 3,941 and 40 touchdowns. As a junior in 2023, he passed for 3,013 yards and 24 touchdowns. Prior to his senior year in 2024, Longstreet participated in the Elite 11 Finals.

A five-star recruit, Longstreet originally committed to play college football at Texas A&M University before flipping to the University of Southern California (USC).
