= Tanook Hines =

American football player (born 2006)

No. 16 – USC Trojans
- Position: Wide receiver
- Class: Sophomore

Personal information
- Born: September 11, 2006 (age 20)
- Listed height: 6 ft 0 in (1.83 m)
- Listed weight: 195 lb (88 kg)

Career information
- High school: Dekaney (Harris County, Texas)
- College: USC (2025–present)
- Stats at ESPN

Tanook Hines (born September 11, 2006) is an American college football wide receiver for the USC Trojans.

== Early life ==
Hines attended Dekaney High School in Harris County, Texas. As a sophomore he had 50 receptions for 867 yards with eight touchdowns and as a junior had 35 receptions for 528 yards and five touchdowns over only six games. As a senior he recorded 46 receptions for 786 yards and six touchdowns. Hines committed to the University of Southern California (USC) to play college football.

== College career ==
Hines earned early playing time his true freshman year at USC in 2025. He had his first 100-yard game against the Oregon Ducks, recording six receptions for 141 yards and a touchdown.
