= 2023 Idaho Vandals football team =

American college football season

2023 Idaho Vandals football

FCS Quarterfinal, L 22–30 vs. Albany
- Conference: Big Sky

Ranking
- STATS: No. 8
- FCS Coaches: No. T–4
- Record: 9–4 (6–2 Big Sky)
- Head coach: Jason Eck (2nd season)
- Offensive coordinator: Luke Schleusner (2nd season)
- Offensive scheme: Spread option
- Defensive coordinator: Rob Aurich (2nd season)
- Base defense: 3–4
- Home stadium: Kibbie Dome

2023 Big Sky Conference football standings
	Conf.			Overall
Team	W		L	W		L
No. 2 Montana $^	7	–	1	13	–	2
No. 8 Idaho ^	6	–	2	9	–	4
No. 9 Montana State ^	6	–	2	8	–	4
Northern Arizona	5	–	3	5	–	6
No. 24 UC Davis	5	–	3	7	–	4
No. 13 Sacramento State ^	4	–	4	8	–	5
Portland State	4	–	4	5	–	6
Weber State	4	–	4	6	–	5
Eastern Washington	3	–	5	4	–	7
Idaho State	3	–	5	3	–	8
Cal Poly	1	–	7	3	–	8
Northern Colorado	0	–	8	0	–	11
$ – Conference champion; ^ – FCS playoff participant; Rankings from STATS Poll

The 2023 Idaho Vandals football team represented the University of Idaho in the Big Sky Conference during the 2023 NCAA Division I FCS football season. Led by second-year head coach Jason Eck, the Vandals were 8–3 (6–2 in Big Sky, 2nd) in the regular season, and played their home games on campus at the Kibbie Dome in Moscow, Idaho. The Vandals drew an average home attendance of 11,737 in 2023.

Seeded fourth in the 24-team FCS playoffs, Idaho received a bye in the first round and hosted two games, but fell in the quarterfinals to Albany to finish at 9–4 (.692).

== Preseason ==
=== Polls ===
On July 23, 2023, during the virtual Big Sky Kickoff, the Vandals were predicted to finish fifth in the Big Sky by the coaches and second by the media.

== Schedule ==
Date	Time	Opponent	Rank	Site	TV	Result	Attendance
August 31	5:00 pm	at Lamar*	No. 8	Provost Umphrey Stadium; Beaumont, TX	ESPN+	W 42–17	5,321
September 9	4:00 p.m.	at Nevada*	No. 7	Mackay Stadium; Reno, NV	KNSN-TV	W 33–6	19,852
September 16	1:00 p.m.	at California*	No. 5	California Memorial Stadium; Berkeley, CA	P12N	L 17–31	36,810
September 23	1:00 p.m.	No. 4 Sacramento State	No. 7	Kibbie Dome; Moscow, ID	ESPN+	W 36–27	9,433
September 30	1:00 p.m.	at No. 19 Eastern Washington	No. 4	Roos Field; Cheney, WA	ESPN+	W 44–36	8,347
October 7	5:00 p.m.	at Cal Poly	No. 3	Alex G. Spanos Stadium; San Luis Obispo, CA	ESPN+	W 42–14	6,028
October 14	7:30 p.m.	No. 16 Montana^{†}	No. 3	Kibbie Dome; Moscow, ID (Little Brown Stein)	ESPN2	L 21–23	14,218
October 28	1:00 p.m.	No. 2 Montana State	No. 9	Kibbie Dome; Moscow, ID	ESPN+	W 24–21	13,073
November 4	12:00 p.m.	at Northern Colorado	No. 3	Nottingham Field; Greeley, CO	ESPN+	W 27–13	3,608
November 11	12:00 p.m.	at Weber State	No. 4	Stewart Stadium; Ogden, UT	ESPN+	L 29–31	8,741
November 18	4:00 p.m.	Idaho State	No. 6	Kibbie Dome; Moscow, ID (rivalry)	ESPN+	W 63–21	9,854
December 2	7:00 p.m.	No. 14 Southern Illinois*	No. 4	Kibbie Dome; Moscow, ID (FCS Second Round)	ESPN2	W 20–17 ^{OT}	9,224
December 9	7:00 p.m.	No. 9 Albany*	No. 4	Kibbie Dome; Moscow, ID (FCS Quarterfinal)	ESPN+	L 22–30	9,372
*Non-conference game; ^{†}Homecoming; Rankings from STATS Poll released prior to the game; All times are in Pacific time

== Game summaries ==
=== at Lamar ===
No. 8 Idaho Vandals (0–0) at Lamar Cardinals (0–0) – Game summary

Quarter	1	2	3	4	Total
No. 8 Vandals	14	14	7	7	42
Cardinals	0	0	3	14	17

at Provost Umphrey Stadium • Beaumont, TX

- Date: August 31, 2023
- Game time: 7:00 p.m. CDT
- Game weather: Sunny • Temperature: 97 °F (36 °C) • Wind: E 10 miles per hour (16 km/h)
- Game attendance: 5,321
- Referee: Craig Hesler
- TV announcers (ESPN+): Dan Gresham, Bob Slovak, Lemont Williams

Game information

First Quarter

- UID – 7:54 Hayden Hatten 6 yd pass from McCoy, Gevani (Pope, Cameron kick) UID 7–0 Drive: 11 plays, 75 yards, TOP 07:06
- UID – 4:45 Woods, Anthony 9 yd run (Pope, Cameron kick) UID 14–0 Drive: 4 plays, 46 yards, TOP 01:30

Second Quarter

- UID – 7:30 Woods, Anthony 6 yd run UID 20–0 Drive: 11 plays, 96 yards, TOP 06:40
- UID – 00:33 Hatten, Hayden 20 yd pass from McCoy, Gevani (Cox, Jake pass) UID 28–0 Drive: 4 plays, 90 yards, TOP 01:17

Third Quarter

- UID – 12:39 Romano, Nick 45 yd pass from Hatten, Hayden (Prescott, Logan kick) UID 35–0 Drive: 2 plays, 47 yards, TOP 00:28
- LU – 4:46 Esqueda, Chris 30 yd field goalUID 35–3 Drive: 10 plays, 37 yards, TOP 04:38

Fourth Quarter

- UID – 9:08 Cox, Jake 15 yd pass from Layne, Jack (Prescott, Logan kick) UID 42–3 Drive: 6 plays, 60 yards, TOP 03:06
- LU – 4:55 Griffin, Khalan 2 yd run (Esqueda, Chris kick) UID 42–10 Drive: 7 plays, 75 yards, TOP 04:13
- LU – 3:29 Hall, Trae 12 yd pass from Coleman, Robert (Esqueda, Chris kick) UID 42–17 Drive: 5 plays, 39 yards, TOP 01:16

Top passers

- IDHO – Gevani McCoy – 14/19, 164 yards, 2 TD
- LU – Robert Coleman – 15/24, 119 yards, INT

Top rushers

- IDHO – Anthony Woods – 13 carries, 138 yards, 2 TD
- LU – Khalan Griffin – 12 carries, 44 yards, TD

Top receivers

- IDHO – Hayden Hatten – 6 receptions, 86 yards, 2 TD
- LU – Andre Dennis – 1 reception, 34 yards

=== at Nevada ===
No. 7 Idaho Vandals (1–0) at Nevada Wolf Pack (0–1) – Game summary

Quarter	1	2	3	4	Total
No. 7 Vandals	14	3	10	6	33
Wolf Pack	3	3	0	0	6

at Mackay Stadium • Reno, NV

- Date: September 9, 2023
- Game time: 4:00 p.m. PDT
- Game attendance: 19,852
- TV announcers (SWX NW/KTVB/KNSN-TV): Alex Margulies, Zack Madonick, Shannon Kelly

=== at California ===
No. 5 Idaho Vandals (2–0) at California Golden Bears (1–1) – Game summary

Quarter	1	2	3	4	Total
No. 5 Vandals	10	7	0	0	17
Golden Bears	0	14	14	3	31

at California Memorial Stadium • Berkeley, CA

- Date: September 16, 2023
- Game time: 1:00 p.m. PDT
- Game attendance: 36,810
- TV announcers (Pac-12 Network): Guy Haberman, Shane Vereen

Game information

First quarter

Second quarter

Third quarter

Fourth quarter

Top passers

- IDHO – Gevani McCoy – 28/46, 279 yards, INT
- CAL – Sam Jackson V – 12/23, 108 yards, 2 TD

Top rushers

- IDHO – Anthony Woods – 11 carries, 56 yards, TD
- CAL – Isaiah Ifanse – 22 carries, 137 yards, TD

Top receivers

- IDHO – Hayden Hatten – 8 receptions, 80 yards
- CAL – Jeremiah Hunter – 5 receptions, 48 yards, TD

=== vs No. 4 Sacramento State ===
No. 4 Sacramento State (3–0) vs No. 7 Idaho Vandals (2–1) – Game summary

Quarter	1	2	3	4	Total
No. 4 Hornets	3	7	7	10	27
No. 7 Vandals	3	10	14	9	36

at Kibbie Dome • Moscow, ID

- Date: September 23, 2023
- Game time: 1:00 p.m. PDT
- Game weather: Sunny, Indoors
- Game attendance: 9,433
- Referee: Jake Iverson
- TV announcers (ESPN+): Play-by-Play: Dennis Patchin • Analysis: Ryan Phillips

Game information

First Quarter

- (7:02) IDHO – Ricardo Chavez 29-yard field goal (Drive: 14 plays, 49 yards, 7:58; Idaho 3–0)
- (2:19) SAC – Zach Schreiner 36-yard field goal (Drive: 13 plays, 56 yards, 4:39; Tied 3–3)

Second Quarter

- (7:19) IDHO – Anthony Woods 2-yard run (Ricardo Chavez kick) (Drive: 12 plays, 68 yards, 7:03; Idaho 10–3)
- (1:26) IDHO – Ricardo Chavez 50-yard field goal (Drive: 8 plays, 32 yards, 4:08; Idaho 13–3)
- (0:31) SAC – Austin Jarrard 5-yard pass from Kaiden Bennett (Zach Schreiner kick) (Drive: 7 plays, 75 yards, 0:55; Idaho 13–10)

Third Quarter

- (10:39) IDHO – Turon Ivy Jr. 52-yard pass from Gevani McCoy (Ricardo Chavez kick) (Drive: 6 plays, 82 yards, 3:00; Idaho 20–10)
- (7:35) SAC – Marcus Fulcher 2-yard run (Zach Schreiner kick) (Drive: 8 plays, 75 yards, 3:04; Idaho 20–17)
- (0:18) IDHO – Terez Traynor 60-yard pass from Gevani McCoy (Ricardo Chavez kick) (Drive: 5 plays, 91 yards, 3:04; Idaho 27–17)

Fourth Quarter

- (11:00) SAC – Zach Schreiner 44-yard field goal (Drive: 13 plays, 54 yards, 4:12; Idaho 27–20)
- (4:54) SAC – Marcus Fulcher 11-yard pass from Kaiden Bennett (Zach Schreiner kick) (Drive: 6 plays, 54 yards, 2:13; Tied 27–27)
- (0:01) IDHO – Ricardo Chavez 30-yard field goal (Drive: 8 plays, 36 yards, 4:46; Idaho 30–27)
- (0:00) IDHO – Turon Ivy Jr. 6-yard fumble return (Idaho 36–27)

Line

- IDHO –2.5

Over/Under

- 57.5

Top passers

- SAC – Kaiden Bennett – 15/29, 236 yards, 2 TD
- IDHO – Gevani McCoy – 15/21, 234 yards, 2 TD

Top rushers

- SAC – Marcus Fulcher – 10 carries, 44 yards, TD
- IDHO – Anthony Woods – 24 carries, 117 yards, TD

Top receivers

- SAC – Jared Gipson – 3 receptions, 91 yards
- IDHO – Hayden Hatten – 7 receptions, 72 yards

=== at No. 19 Eastern Washington ===
No. 4 Idaho Vandals (3–1) at No. 19 Eastern Washington (2–2) – Game summary

Quarter	1	2	3	4	Total
No. 4 Vandals	7	14	10	13	44
No. 19 Eagles	7	14	7	8	36

at Roos Field • Cheney, WA

- Date: September 30, 2023
- Game time: 1:00 p.m. PDT
- Game attendance: 8,347
- TV announcers (ESPN+/SWX NW): Dennis Patchin, Greg Peach

=== at Cal Poly ===
No. 3 Idaho Vandals (4–1) at Cal Poly Mustangs (2–3) – Game summary

Quarter	1	2	3	4	Total
No. 3 Vandals	7	21	7	7	42
Mustangs	0	7	0	7	14

at Mustang Memorial Field • San Luis Obispo, CA

- Date: October 7, 2023
- Game time: 5:00 p.m. PDT
- Game attendance: 6,028
- TV announcers (ESPN+): Chris Sylvester, John Kane

=== vs No. 16 Montana ===
No. 16 Montana Grizzlies (5–1) vs No. 3 Idaho Vandals (5–1) – Game summary

Quarter	1	2	3	4	Total
No. 16 Grizzlies	10	10	0	3	23
No. 3 Vandals	0	7	0	14	21

at Kibbie Dome • Moscow, ID

- Date: October 14, 2023
- Game time: 7:30 p.m. PDT
- Game attendance: 14,218
- TV announcers (ESPN2): Jorge Sedano, Orlando Franklin, Marilyn Payne

=== vs No. 2 Montana State ===
No. 2 Montana State Bobcats (6–1) vs No. 9 Idaho Vandals (5–2) – Game summary

Quarter	1	2	3	4	Total
No. 2 Bobcats	0	0	14	7	21
No. 9 Vandals	3	7	0	14	24

at Kibbie Dome • Moscow, ID

- Date: October 28, 2023
- Game time: 1:00 p.m. PDT
- Game attendance: 13,073
- TV announcers (MTN-CW/SWX NW/ESPN+): Ben Creighton, Ty Gregorak, Scott Breen

=== at Northern Colorado ===
No. 3 Idaho Vandals (6–2) at Northern Colorado Bears (0–8) – Game summary

Quarter	1	2	3	4	Total
No. 3 Vandals	3	7	7	10	27
Bears	0	7	0	6	13

at Nottingham Field • Greeley, CO

- Date: November 4, 2023
- Game time: 1:00 p.m. MDT
- Game attendance: 3,608
- TV announcers (ESPN+): Jason Alvine, Nick Hager

=== at Weber State ===
No. 4 Idaho Vandals (7–2) at Weber State Wildcats (4–5) – Game summary

Quarter	1	2	3	4	Total
No. 4 Vandals	3	10	8	8	29
Wildcats	0	14	14	3	31

at Stewart Stadium • Ogden, UT

- Date: November 11, 2023
- Game time: 1:00 p.m. PDT
- Game attendance: 8,741
- TV announcers (ESPN+): Tony Parks, Riley Jensen

=== vs Idaho State ===
Idaho State Bengals (3–7) vs No. 6 Idaho Vandals (7–3) – Game summary

Quarter	1	2	3	4	Total
Bengals	0	0	7	14	21
No. 6 Vandals	28	28	0	7	63

at Kibbie Dome • Moscow, ID

- Date: November 18, 2023
- Game time: 4:00 p.m. PDT
- Game weather: None (indoor stadium)
- Game attendance: 9,854
- Referee: Gregg Wilson
- TV announcers (KIVI/KSAW-LD/SWX NW/ESPN+): Dennis Patchin, Ryan Phillips

Game information

First quarter

- (10:00) IDHO – Anthony Woods 7-yard run, Ricardo Chavez kick (Drive: 10 plays, 65 yards, 4:53; Idaho 7–0)
- (6:07) IDHO – Hayden Hatten 24-yard pass from Jack Layne, Ricardo Chavez kick (Drive: 5 plays, 58 yards, 2:27; Idaho 14–0)
- (3:06) IDHO – Jordan Dwyer 45-yard pass from Jack Layne, Ricardo Chavez kick (Drive: 2 plays, 75 yards, 0:42; Idaho 21–0)
- (1:42) IDHO – Jermaine Jackson 79-yard punt return, Ricardo Chavez kick (Idaho 28–0)

Second quarter

- (14:23) IDHO – Jake Cox 3-yard pass from Jack Layne, Ricardo Chavez kick (Drive: 4 plays, 28 yards, 1:49; Idaho 35–0)
- (12:12) IDHO – Jermaine Jackson 15-yard pass from Jack Layne, Ricardo Chavez kick (Drive: 3 plays, 60 yards, 1:12; Idaho 42–0)
- (8:38) IDHO – Anthony Woods 13-yard pass from Jack Layne, Ricardo Chavez kick (Drive: 5 plays, 33 yards, 2:16; Idaho 49–0)
- (3:04) IDHO – Hayden Hatten 11-yard pass from Jack Layne, Ricardo Chavez kick (Drive: 10 plays, 79 yards, 4:48; Idaho 56–0)

Third quarter

- (6:14) IDST – Christian Fredericksen 11-yard pass from Jackson Sharman, Thomas Kopcho kick (Drive: 7 plays, 58 yards, 3:00; Idaho 56–7)

Fourth quarter

- (10:34) IDST – Adam Watts 5-yard pass from Jackson Sharman, Thomas Kopcho kick (Drive: 3 plays, 61 yards, 1:09; Idaho 56–14)
- (8:02) IDHO – Jack Schuster 18-yard pass from Jack Wagner, Ricardo Chavez kick (Drive: 4 plays, 54 yards, 2:25; Idaho 63–14)
- (4:40) IDST – Cyrus Wallace 28-yard pass from Matthew Cavallaro, Thomas Kopcho kick (Drive: 9 plays, 75 yards, 3:22; Idaho 63–21)

Top passers

- IDST – Jackson Sharman – 11/21, 124 yards, 2 TD, INT
- IDHO – Jack Lyne – 20/26, 275 yards, 6 TD

Top rushers

- IDST – Soujah Gasu – 6 carries, 24 yards
- IDHO – Anthony Woods – 18 carries, 115 yards, TD

Top receivers

- IDST – Chedon James – 10 receptions, 145 yards
- IDHO – Jordan Dwyer – 3 receptions, 100 yards, TD

== Rankings ==
Ranking movements Legend: ██ Increase in ranking ██ Decrease in ranking ( ) = First-place votes
	Week													
Poll	Pre	1	2	3	4	5	6	7	8	9	10	11	12	Final
STATS FCS	8	7	5 (1)	7	4	3	3	10	9	3	4	6	4	8
Coaches	13	12	10	10	5	3	3	8	8	5	4	8	4	4
