= 2023 Idaho State Bengals football team =

American college football season

2023 Idaho State Bengals football
- Conference: Big Sky Conference
- Record: 3–8 (3–5 Big Sky)
- Head coach: Cody Hawkins (1st season)
- Offensive scheme: Run and shoot
- Defensive coordinator: Josh Runda (1st season)
- Base defense: 3–3–5
- Captains: Mike Davis; Cortland Horton; Calvin Pitcher
- Home stadium: Holt Arena

2023 Big Sky Conference football standings
	Conf.			Overall
Team	W		L	W		L
No. 2 Montana $^	7	–	1	13	–	2
No. 8 Idaho ^	6	–	2	9	–	4
No. 9 Montana State ^	6	–	2	8	–	4
Northern Arizona	5	–	3	5	–	6
No. 24 UC Davis	5	–	3	7	–	4
No. 13 Sacramento State ^	4	–	4	8	–	5
Portland State	4	–	4	5	–	6
Weber State	4	–	4	6	–	5
Eastern Washington	3	–	5	4	–	7
Idaho State	3	–	5	3	–	8
Cal Poly	1	–	7	3	–	8
Northern Colorado	0	–	8	0	–	11
$ – Conference champion; ^ – FCS playoff participant; Rankings from STATS Poll

The 2023 Idaho State Bengals football team represented Idaho State University in the Big Sky Conference during the 2023 NCAA Division I FCS football season. Led by first-year head coach Cody Hawkins, the Bengals played their home games at Holt Arena, an indoor facility located on the University's campus in Pocatello, Idaho.

== Preseason ==
=== Polls ===
On July 23, 2023, during the virtual Big Sky Kickoff, the Bengals were predicted to finish last in the Big Sky by both the coaches and media.

=== Preseason All–Big Sky team ===
The Bengals had no players selected to the Preseason All–Big Sky team.

== Roster ==
2023 Idaho State Bengals football team roster
Players
Coaches
Offense

Pos.	#	Name	Class
QB	0	Matthew Cavallaro	GS
QB	1	Jordan Cooke	So
WR	2	Chedon James	So
WR	4	Aaron Blancas	Jr
RB	5	Raiden Hunter	Jr
QB	6	Jake Sanders	Jr
QB	7	Hunter Hays	Jr
QB	8	Jackson Sharman	Fr
WR	9	Alfred Jordan Jr.	Fr
QB	10	Keegan Thompson	So
WR	11	Ian Duarte	Fr
WR	12	Damir Abdullah	So
WR	13	Kaysen Isom	So
WR	14	Michael Shulikov	Fr
WR	15	Christian Fredericksen	Jr
WR	16	Damien Morgan	So
WR	17	Cyrus Wallace	Sr
WR	18	Raiden Brown	Fr
RB	20	Aiden Taylor	So
WR	22	Aidan Garcia	Fr
WR	23	Connor Maloney	So
RB	24	Keoua Kauhi II	Jr
WR	25	Abrahn Silverio	Fr
RB	28	Daniel Carrillo	So
RB	32	Soujah Gasu	Sr
RB	40	Gerald Norte	Jr
OL	50	Alex Ramirez	So
OL	53	Messiyah Moye	Fr
OL	54	Jorgen Miller	Fr
OL	55	Gunnar Clark	So
OL	57	Joesph Toilolo	So
OL	58	Vicente Hughes	Fr
OL	60	Hunter Hill	So
OL	61	Zachary Shiroma	Jr
OL	64	Mike Davis (C)	Sr
OL	65	Takeo Kano	Fr
OL	70	Ryo Kano	Fr
OL	72	William Davis	Fr
OL	73	Talin Togiai	Fr
OL	74	Owen Stewart	Jr
OL	75	Jacob Angel	Sr
OL	76	Jaedon Garcia	So
OL	77	Jack O'Connor	So
WR	80	Julian Mason	So
TE	83	Maika Heck	Jr
WR	84	Shane Dailey Jr.	Fr
WR	85	Malakye Scott	Fr
WR	86	Kolton Tanner	Fr
WR	87	Robert Vega	Fr
WR	89	Adam Watts	Fr

Defense

Pos.	#	Name	Class
LB	0	Adrian Rodriguez	So
CB	1	Josh Alford	Jr
CB	2	Tylor Bohannon	Jr
LB	4	Kris Sanchez	Jr
S	5	Jayden Bell	Fr
S	6	Calvin Pitcher (C)	Jr
DL	7	Chestar Geffard	Sr
S	8	Quade Renfro	Jr
S	9	Herman Smith	Fr
LB	10	Jagger Giles	Jr
S	11	Junior Damuni	So
S	12	Noa Calaycay	Fr
S	14	Tyler Williams	Jr
CB	16	Viliata Tua'one	Fr
LB	17	Nathan Reynolds	Fr
LB	18	Nick Larriva	Jr
DB	21	Jihad Brown	Jr
S	22	Mason Young	Fr
LB	23	Teilor Tuioti	Jr
CB	24	Adonijah Richards	Fr
DL	25	Todd Payne	GS
S	26	Mathew Sanchez	Jr
LB	27	Vaeaega Gasu	Jr
LB	28	Dason Brooks	Fr
DL	29	Cortland Horton (C)	Jr
S	30	Dekker Hagler	Fr
S	31	Riis Weber	Fr
S	32	Kolton Kirby	Fr
CB	34	Deville Dickerson	So
CB	36	Sanborne Melson	Fr
LB	38	William Wallis	Fr
S	42	Wyatt Farnsworth	Fr
DL	43	Tuaoa Tauili'ili	So
LB	44	Jacob Perez	Fr
LB	45	Emmitt Sallee	Fr
DL	46	Logan George	Fr
DL	47	Zack Conner	Jr
DL	48	Kamiah Olsen	So
DL	51	Curtis Hill	So
DL	52	Spencer Tatafu	Jr
DL	55	Zion To'oto'o	So
LB	56	Kall Renner	Fr
DL	91	Joseph Perez-Garibay	Fr
DL	93	Beau Jaques	Fr
DL	94	Josiah Sagale	So
DL	96	David Rowe	Jr
DL	97	Malik Richardson	Fr

Special teams

Pos.	#	Name	Class
K	27	Nick Phelps	GS
K	31	Regan Baker	So
K	35	Thomas Kopcho	GS
LS	37	Scott Atkinson	Fr
K	39	Yoann Kinanga	Fr
K	49	Ross Bolger	Fr
LS	59	Luke Whiting	Fr

Head coach

- Cody Hawkins

Coordinators/assistant coaches

- Josh Runda – Defensive coordinator
- Mark Weber – Offensive line
- Jacob Thomas – Running backs/run game coordinator
- Jesse Thompson – Director of football operations/special teams coordinator
- Josh Mondt – Quarterbacks/wide receivers
- Nick Alaimalo – Inside receivers/associate special teams coordinator
- Scott Thiessen – Safeties
- Devin Holiday – Cornerbacks
- Keith Price – Wide receivers
- Devon King – Cornerbacks assistant
- Jeff Pitman – Assistant head coach/director of strength & conditioning & culture
- Brandon Stephens – Director of strength & conditioning
- Kody Hensley – Chief of staff
- Dynomite Kuhn – Special teams coordinator
- Jarrett Meeker – Offensive analyst/video coordinator
- Dustin Enslinger – Head athletic trainer

Legend

- (C) Team captain
- (S) Suspended
- (I) Ineligible
- Injured
- Redshirt

Roster
Last update: September 2, 2023

== Schedule ==
Date	Time	Opponent	Site	TV	Result	Attendance
September 2	8:30 p.m.	at San Diego State*	Snapdragon Stadium; San Diego, CA	CBSSN	L 28–36	22,345
September 9	6:00 p.m.	at Utah State*	Maverik Stadium; Logan, UT	MWN	L 28–78	20,034
September 16	4:00 p.m.	Northern Iowa*	Holt Arena; Pocatello, ID	ESPN+	L 17–41	N/A
September 23	4:00 p.m.	Northern Colorado^{†}	Holt Arena; Pocatello, ID	ESPN+	W 35–21	8,012
September 30	2:00 p.m.	at No. 18 Montana	Washington–Grizzly Stadium; Missoula, MT	ESPN+/Scripps	L 20–28	26,678
October 14	4:00 p.m.	No. 21 Eastern Washington	Holt Arena; Pocatello, ID	ESPN+	W 42–41	6,763
October 21	2:00 p.m.	at Portland State	Hillsboro Stadium; Hillsboro, OR	ESPN+	W 38–24	2,174
October 28	7:00 p.m.	at No. 6 Sacramento State	Hornet Stadium; Sacramento, CA	ESPN+	L 16–51	13,733
November 4	4:00 p.m.	Weber State	Holt Arena; Pocatello, ID	ESPN+	L 21–33	8,233
November 11	4:00 p.m.	UC Davis	Holt Arena; Pocatello, ID	ESPN+	L 14–21	7,001
November 18	5:00 p.m.	at No. 6 Idaho	Kibbie Dome; Moscow, ID (rivalry)	ESPN+	L 21–63	9,854
*Non-conference game; ^{†}Homecoming; Rankings from STATS Poll released prior to the game; All times are in Mountain time

== Game summaries ==
=== at San Diego State (FBS) ===
Idaho State Bengals (0–0) at San Diego State Aztecs (FBS) (0–0) – Game summary

Quarter	1	2	3	4	Total
Bengals	3	10	0	15	28
Aztecs (FBS)	10	10	9	7	36

at Snapdragon Stadium • San Diego, California

- Date: September 2
- Game time: 8:30 p.m. MDT
- Game weather: Sunny • Temperature: 74 °F (23 °C) • Wind: N at 6 miles per hour (9.7 km/h)
- Game attendance: 22,345
- Referee: Michael Cuttone
- TV announcers (CBSSN): Michael Grady (play-by-play) and Donte Whitner (analyst)
- Box score, Recap

Game information

First quarter

- (8:49) IDST – Thomas Kopcho 32-yard field goal (Drive: 11 plays, 61 yards, 3:10; Idaho State 3–0)
- (6:50) SDSU – Jack Browning 43-yard field goal (Drive: 6 plays, 33 yards, 1:48; Tied 3–3)
- (2:54) SDSU – Jalen Mayden 24-yard run, Jack Browning kick (Drive: 2 plays, 32 yards, 0:44; San Diego State 10–3)

Second quarter

- (14:50) IDST – Thomas Kopcho 33-yard field goal (Drive: 8 plays, 59 yards, 3:04; San Diego State 10–6)
- (6:35) SDSU – Jaylon Armstead 4-yard run, Jack Browning kick (Drive: 12 plays, 68 yards, 7:12; San Diego State 17–6)
- (1:10) SDSU – Jack Browning 41-yard field goal (Drive: 7 plays, 25 yards, 3:22; San Diego State 20–6)
- (0:14) IDST – Christian Fredericksen 24-yard pass from Jordan Cooke, Thomas Kopcho kick (Drive: 6 plays, 65 yards, 0:50; San Diego State 20–13)

Third quarter

- (8:48) SDSU – Ross Bolger punt blocked in end zone for a safety (San Diego State 22–13)
- (6:09) SDSU – Martin Blake 3-yard run, Jack Browning kick (Drive: 5 plays, 27 yards, 2:32; San Diego State 29–13)

Fourth quarter

- (13:34) IDST – Chedon James 8-yard pass from Hunter Hays, Alfred Jordan Jr. pass from Hunter Hays (Drive: 14 plays, 80 yards, 4:59; San Diego State 29–21)
- (6:50) SDSU – Jalen Mayden 56-yard run, Jack Browning kick (Drive: 3 plays, 70 yards, 1:22; San Diego State 36–21)
- (0:39) IDST – Hunter Hays 2-yard run, Thomas Kopcho kick (Drive: 11 plays, 68 yards, 3:01; San Diego State 36–28)

Statistics	IDST	SDSU
First downs	24	18
Plays–yards	70–344	67–389
Rushes–yards	17–22	47–304
Passing yards	322	85
Passing: comp–att–int	31–63–3	13–20–1
Time of possession	25:32	34:28

Team	Category	Player	Statistics
Idaho State	Passing	Jordan Cooke	19/42, 177 yards, 1 TD, 2 INT
Idaho State	Rushing	Hunter Hays	9 carries, 18 yards, 1 TD
Idaho State	Receiving	Christian Fredericksen	5 receptions, 66 yards, 1 TD
San Diego State	Passing	Jalen Mayden	13/19, 85 yards
San Diego State	Rushing	Jalen Mayden	8 carries, 132 yards, 2 TD
San Diego State	Receiving	Martin Blake	3 receptions, 40 yards

=== at Utah State (FBS) ===
Idaho State Bengals (0–1) at Utah State Aggies (FBS) (0–1) – Game summary

Quarter	1	2	3	4	Total
Bengals	7	7	7	7	28
Aggies (FBS)	7	44	14	13	78

at Maverik Stadium • Logan, Utah

- Date: September 9
- Game time: 6:00 p.m. MDT
- Game weather: Sunny • Temperature: 78 °F (26 °C) • Wind: W at 8 miles per hour (13 km/h)
- Game attendance: 20,034
- Referee: Gary Leeper
- TV announcers (MWN): Dave Fox (play-by-play), Alema Harrington (analyst), and Frank Dolce (sideline reporter)
- Box score, Recap

Game information

First quarter

- (14:33) USU – Robert Briggs Jr. 58-yard run, William Testa kick (Drive: 2 plays, 65 yards, 0:27; Utah State 7–0)
- (10:59) IDST – Christian Fredericksen 9-yard pass from Jordan Cooke, Thomas Kopcho kick (Drive: 7 plays, 75 yards, 3:34; Tied 7–7)

Second quarter

- (14:51) USU – Davon Booth 8-yard run, William Testa kick (Drive: 8 plays, 80 yards, 2:40; Utah State 14–7)
- (12:09) USU – Davon Booth 40-yard run, William Testa kick (Drive: 3 plays, 67 yards, 1:25; Utah State 21–7)
- (6:35) USU – Terrell Vaughn 4-yard pass from Cooper Legas, William Testa kick (Drive: 11 plays, 75 yards, 4:02; Utah State 28–7)
- (5:44) USU – Ike Larsen 47-yard interception return, two-point run failed (Utah State 34–7)
- (5:24) USU – Jalen Royals 20-yard pass from Cooper Legas, Elliott Nimrod kick (Drive: 1 play, 20 yards, 0:07; Utah State 41–7)
- (4:08) USU – Rahsul Faison 60-yard run, Elliott Nimrod kick (Drive: 2 plays, 60 yards, 0:19; Utah State 48–7)
- (0:16) IDST – Christian Fredericksen 15-yard pass from Hunter Hays, Thomas Kopcho kick (Drive: 10 plays, 75 yards, 3:52; Utah State 48–14)
- (0:01) USU – Elliott Nimrod 37-yard field goal (Drive: 1 play, 0 yards, 0:05; Utah State 51–14)

Third quarter

- (8:58) USU – Terrell Vaughn 5-yard pass from Levi Williams, Elliott Nimrod kick (Drive: 11 plays, 62 yards, 3:48; Utah State 58–14)
- (3:58) USU – Micah Davis 47-yard pass from Levi Williams, Elliott Nimrod kick (Drive: 2 plays, 46 yards, 0:32; Utah State 65–14)
- (0:00) IDST – Michael Shulikov 12-yard pass from Hunter Hays, Thomas Kopcho kick (Drive: 11 plays, 75 yards, 3:58; Utah State 65–21)

Fourth quarter

- (9:15) IDST – Raiden Hunter 1-yard run, Thomas Kopcho kick (Drive: 13 plays, 77 yards, 4:34; Utah State 65–28)
- (4:25) USU – Cooper Jones 1-yard run, Elliott Nimrod kick failed (Drive: 11 plays, 63 yards, 4:44; Utah State 71–28)
- (0:54) USU – Jaiden Francois 75-yard interception return, Elliott Nimrod kick (Utah State 78–28)

Statistics	IDST	USU
First downs	28	23
Plays–yards	83–424	69–591
Rushes–yards	30–101	41–380
Passing yards	323	211
Passing: comp–att–int	34–53–2	22–28–0
Time of possession	33:27	26:33

Team	Category	Player	Statistics
Idaho State	Passing	Jordan Cooke	20/30, 185 yards, 1 TD, 1 INT
Idaho State	Rushing	Soujah Gasu	6 carries, 30 yards
Idaho State	Receiving	Christian Fredericksen	8 receptions, 116 yards, 2 TD
Utah State	Passing	Cooper Legas	14/16, 125 yards, 2 TD
Utah State	Rushing	Robert Briggs Jr.	9 carries, 101 yards, 1 TD
Utah State	Receiving	Terrell Vaughn	11 receptions, 73 yards, 2 TD

=== vs Northern Iowa ===
Northern Iowa Panthers (0–2) vs Idaho State Bengals (0–2) – Game summary

Quarter	1	2	3	4	Total
Panthers	14	13	7	7	41
Bengals	3	0	7	7	17

at Holt Arena • Pocatello, Idaho

- Date: September 16
- Game time: 4:00 p.m. MDT
- Game weather: None (indoor stadium)
- Game attendance: N/A
- Referee: Joe Don
- TV announcers (ESPN+): Dylan Carder (play-by-play) and Kody Graves (analyst)
- Box score, Recap

Game information

First quarter

- (5:46) UNI – Tyjahree Edwards 2-yard run, Matthew Cook kick (Drive: 13 plays, 91 yards, 5:47; Northern Iowa 7–0)
- (4:33) UNI – Sam Schnee 53-yard pass from Theo Day, Matthew Cook kick (Drive: 2 plays, 65 yards, 0:38; Northern Iowa 14–0)
- (2:24) IDST – Thomas Kopcho 49-yard field goal (Drive: 7 plays, 38 yards, 2:02; Northern Iowa 14–3)

Second quarter

- (12:13) UNI – Matthew Cook 26-yard field goal (Drive: 11 plays, 67 yards, 5:11; Northern Iowa 17–3)
- (3:53) UNI – Matthew Cook 47-yard field goal (Drive: 13 plays, 58 yards, 5:37; Northern Iowa 20–3)
- (0:12) UNI – Sam Schnee 14-yard pass from Theo Day, Matthew Cook kick (Drive: 9 plays, 69 yards, 1:25; Northern Iowa 27–3)

Third quarter

- (6:17) UNI – Harrison Bey-Buie 3-yard run, Matthew Cook kick (Drive: 6 plays, 61 yards, 2:36; Northern Iowa 34–3)
- (0:27) IDST – Aiden Taylor 1-yard run, Thomas Kopcho kick (Drive: 12 plays, 75 yards, 5:50; Northern Iowa 34–10)

Fourth quarter

- (9:05) UNI – Josh Jenkins 12-yard run, Matthew Cook kick (Drive: 11 plays, 70 yards, 6:22; Northern Iowa 41–10)
- (5:40) IDST – Michael Shulikov 34-yard pass from Hunter Hays, Thomas Kopcho kick (Drive: 9 plays, 75 yards, 3:25; Northern Iowa 41–17)

Statistics	UNI	IDST
First downs	32	22
Plays–yards	79–527	61–346
Rushes–yards	39–139	17–28
Passing yards	388	318
Passing: comp–att–int	29–40–0	30–44–1
Time of possession	36:27	23:33

Team	Category	Player	Statistics
Northern Iowa	Passing	Theo Day	29/39, 388 yards, 2 TD
Northern Iowa	Rushing	Josh Jenkins	11 carries, 69 yards, 1 TD
Northern Iowa	Receiving	Sam Schnee	7 receptions, 174 yards, 2 TD
Idaho State	Passing	Jordan Cooke	23/35, 249 yards, 1 INT
Idaho State	Rushing	Hunter Hays	3 carries, 24 yards
Idaho State	Receiving	Chedon James	8 receptions, 121 yards

=== vs Northern Colorado ===
Northern Colorado Bears (0–3) vs Idaho State Bengals (0–3) – Game summary

Quarter	1	2	3	4	Total
Bears	7	0	14	0	21
Bengals	7	14	7	7	35

at Holt Arena • Pocatello, Idaho

- Date: September 23
- Game time: 4:00 p.m. MDT
- Game weather: None (indoor stadium)
- Game attendance: 8,012
- Referee: Jim C.
- TV announcers (ESPN+): Dylan Carder (play-by-play) and Kody Graves (analyst)
- Box score, Recap

Game information

First quarter

- (7:04) UNCO – Darius Stewart 16-yard run, Hunter Green kick (Drive: 9 plays, 83 yards, 4:37; Northern Colorado 7–0)
- (0:07) IDST – Alfred Jordan Jr. 32-yard pass from Jordan Cooke, Thomas Kopcho kick (Drive: 7 plays, 74 yards, 2:37; Tied 7–7)

Second quarter

- (5:31) IDST – Jordan Cooke 1-yard run, Thomas Kopcho kick (Drive: 10 plays, 72 yards, 4:25; Idaho State 14–7)
- (0:20) IDST – Chedon James 1-yard pass from Hunter Hays, Thomas Kopcho kick (Drive: 7 plays, 62 yards, 1:14; Idaho State 21–7)

Third quarter

- (10:32) UNCO – Jacob Sirmon 1-yard run, Hunter Green kick (Drive: 9 plays, 63 yards, 4:22; Idaho State 21–14)
- (5:09) UNCO – David Afari 18-yard run, Hunter Green kick (Drive: 9 plays, 73 yards, 4:00; Tied 21–21)
- (2:45) IDST – Aiden Taylor 8-yard run, Thomas Kopcho kick (Drive: 6 plays, 75 yards, 2:24; Idaho State 28–21)

Fourth quarter

- (5:05) IDST – Hunter Hays 2-yard run, Thomas Kopcho kick (Drive: 12 plays, 58 yards, 5:56; Idaho State 35–21)

Statistics	UNCO	IDST
First downs	25	26
Plays–yards	72–365	72–429
Rushes–yards	40–242	30–103
Passing yards	123	326
Passing: comp–att–int	22–32–2	26–42–1
Time of possession	31:13	28:47

Team	Category	Player	Statistics
Northern Colorado	Passing	Jacob Sirmon	22/32, 123 yards, 2 INT
Northern Colorado	Rushing	Darius Stewart	14 carries, 124 yards, 1 TD
Northern Colorado	Receiving	Ty Arrington	5 receptions, 42 yards
Idaho State	Passing	Jordan Cooke	14/23, 218 yards, 1 TD, 1 INT
Idaho State	Rushing	Hunter Hays	13 carries, 55 yards, 1 TD
Idaho State	Receiving	Christian Fredericksen	7 receptions, 108 yards

=== at No. 18 Montana ===
Idaho State Bengals (1–3) at No. 18 Montana Grizzlies (3–1) – Game summary

Quarter	1	2	3	4	Total
Bengals	7	0	7	6	20
No. 18 Grizzlies	7	0	14	7	28

at Washington–Grizzly Stadium • Missoula, Montana

- Date: September 30
- Game time: 2:00 p.m. MDT
- Game weather: Cloudy, 50 °F (10 °C)
- Game attendance: 26,678
- Referee: Jeff Reid
- TV announcers (ESPN+/Scripps): Jay Kohn (play-by-play), Marty Mornhinweg (analyst), and Kyle Hansen (sideline reporter)
- Box score, Recap

Game information

First quarter

- (9:21) MONT – Clifton McDowell 8-yard run, Grant Glasgow kick (Drive: 11 plays, 58 yards, 5:34; Montana 7–0)
- (0:38) IDST – Chedon James 4-yard pass from Jordan Cooke, Thomas Kopcho kick (Drive: 10 plays, 61 yards, 4:29; Tied 7–7)

Second quarter

- No scoring plays

Third quarter

- (12:40) MONT – Aaron Fontes 2-yard pass from Clifton McDowell, Grant Glasgow kick (Drive: 6 plays, 50 yards, 2:14; Montana 14–7)
- (9:44) IDST – Chedon James 28-yard pass from Jordan Cooke, Thomas Kopcho kick (Drive: 7 plays, 75 yards, 2:56; Tied 14–14)
- (5:09) MONT – Evan Shafer 15-yard pass from Sawyer Racanelli, Grant Glasgow kick (Drive: 9 plays, 75 yards, 4:35; Montana 21–14)

Fourth quarter

- (14:11) IDST – Cyrus Wallace 6-yard pass from Jordan Cooke, two-point conversion failed (Drive: 12 plays, 82 yards, 5:52; Montana 21–20)
- (7:37) MONT – Eli Gillman 3-yard run, Grant Glasgow kick (Drive: 12 plays, 67 yards, 6:29; Montana 28–20)

Statistics	IDST	MONT
First downs	19	24
Plays–yards	60–334	76–394
Rushes–yards	13–45	51–174
Passing yards	289	220
Passing: comp–att–int	31–47–2	18–25–0
Time of possession	25:06	34:54

Team	Category	Player	Statistics
Idaho State	Passing	Jordan Cooke	31/47, 289 yards, 3 TD, 2 INT
Idaho State	Rushing	Jordan Cooke	5 carries, 22 yards
Idaho State	Receiving	Chedon James	7 receptions, 79 yards, 2 TD
Montana	Passing	Clifton McDowell	13/20, 160 yards, 1 TD
Montana	Rushing	Clifton McDowell	20 carries, 66 yards, 1 TD
Montana	Receiving	Junior Bergen	7 receptions, 100 yards

=== vs No. 21 Eastern Washington ===
No. 21 Eastern Washington Eagles (2–3) vs Idaho State Bengals (1–4) – Game summary

Quarter	1	2	3	4	Total
No. 21 Eagles	14	21	6	0	41
Bengals	0	14	7	21	42

at Holt Arena • Pocatello, Idaho

- Date: October 14
- Game time: 4:00 p.m. MDT
- Game weather: None (indoor stadium)
- Game attendance: 6,763
- Referee: Scott Root
- TV announcers (ESPN+): Dylan Carder (play-by-play) and Kody Graves (analyst)
- Box score, Recap

Game information

First quarter

- (4:58) EWU – Efton Chism III 13-yard pass from Kekoa Visperas, Soren McKee kick (Drive: 6 plays, 80 yards, 2:27; Eastern Washington 7–0)
- (1:08) EWU – Tuna Altahir 8-yard run, Soren McKee kick (Drive: 4 plays, 57 yards, 1:13; Eastern Washington 14–0)

Second quarter

- (14:30) EWU – Michael Wortham 23-yard run, Soren McKee kick (Drive: 4 plays, 69 yards, 1:30; Eastern Washington 21–0)
- (12:53) IDST – Soujah Gasu 38-yard run, Yoann Kinanga kick (Drive: 4 plays, 75 yards, 1:37; Eastern Washington 21–7)
- (8:35) EWU – Efton Chism III 10-yard pass from Kekoa Visperas, Soren McKee kick (Drive: 12 plays, 72 yards, 4:10; Eastern Washington 28–7)
- (1:15) EWU – Miles Williams 32-yard pass from Kekoa Visperas, Soren McKee kick (Drive: 2 plays, 41 yards, 0:27; Eastern Washington 35–7)
- (0:04) IDST – Chedon James 2-yard pass from Hunter Hays, Thomas Kopcho kick (Drive: 7 plays, 75 yards, 1:11; Eastern Washington 35–14)

Third quarter

- (5:11) EWU – Soren McKee 32-yard field goal (Drive: 13 plays, 61 yards, 6:14; Eastern Washington 38–14)
- (1:48) EWU – Soren McKee 30-yard field goal (Drive: 4 plays, -5 yards, 1:00; Eastern Washington 41–14)
- (0:46) IDST – Cyrus Wallace 15-yard pass from Jordan Cooke, Thomas Kopcho kick (Drive: 2 plays, 75 yards, 1:02; Eastern Washington 41–21)

Fourth quarter

- (10:06) IDST – Soujah Gasu 1-yard run, Thomas Kopcho kick (Drive: 6 plays, 90 yards, 2:04; Eastern Washington 41–28)
- (3:28) IDST – Aaron Blancas 25-yard pass from Jordan Cooke kick (Drive: 7 plays, 68 yards, 2:23; Eastern Washington 41–35)
- (0:52) IDST – Hunter Hays 1-yard run, Thomas Kopcho kick (Drive: 7 plays, 36 yards, 2:31; Idaho State 42–41)

Statistics	EWU	IDST
First downs	32	29
Plays–yards	79–553	75–572
Rushes–yards	32–150	20–49
Passing yards	403	523
Passing: comp–att–int	33–47–0	38–55–2
Time of possession	33:29	26:31

Team	Category	Player	Statistics
Eastern Washington	Passing	Kekoa Visperas	33/47, 403 yards, 3 TD
Eastern Washington	Rushing	Michael Wortham	6 carries, 69 yards, 1 TD
Eastern Washington	Receiving	Efton Chism III	13 receptions, 161 yards, 2 TD
Idaho State	Passing	Jordan Cooke	25/39, 389 yards, 2 TD, 1 INT
Idaho State	Rushing	Soujah Gasu	8 carries, 72 yards, 1 TD
Idaho State	Receiving	Chedon James	15 receptions, 206 yards, 1 TD

=== at Portland State ===
Idaho State Bengals (2–4) at Portland State Vikings (3–3) – Game summary

Quarter	1	2	3	4	Total
Bengals	14	14	0	10	38
Vikings	7	10	7	0	24

at Hillsboro Stadium • Hillsboro, Oregon

- Date: October 21
- Game time: 2:00 p.m. MDT
- Game weather: Cloudy • Temperature: 61 °F (16 °C) • Wind: E at 1 mile per hour (1.6 km/h)
- Game attendance: 2,174
- Referee: Robert Quello
- TV announcers (ESPN+): Matt Richert (play-by-play) and Scott Hermo (analyst)
- Box score, Recap

Game information

First quarter

- (10:24) IDST – Jordan Cooke 3-yard run, Thomas Kopcho kick (Drive: 9 plays, 81 yards, 3:25; Idaho State 7–0)
- (7:59) IDST – Chedon James 12-yard pass from Jordan Cooke, Thomas Kopcho kick (Drive: 2 plays, 29 yards, 0:30; Idaho State 14–0)
- (0:17) PRST – Andrew Van Buren 3-yard run, Gianni Smith kick (Drive: 9 plays, 45 yards, 4:10; Idaho State 14–7)

Second quarter

- (7:40) PRST – Marquis Spiker 30-yard pass from Dante Chachere, Gianni Smith kick (Drive: 8 plays, 70 yards, 3:56; Tied 14–14)
- (6:01) IDST – Hunter Hays 1-yard run, Thomas Kopcho kick (Drive: 7 plays, 75 yards, 1:39; Idaho State 21–14)
- (0:46) IDST – Aiden Taylor 3-yard run, Thomas Kopcho kick (Drive: 6 plays, 81 yards, 2:28; Idaho State 28–14)
- (0:00) PRST – Gianni Smith 41-yard field goal (Drive: 7 plays, 42 yards, 0:41; Idaho State 28–17)

Third quarter

- (6:09) PRST – Dante Chachere 3-yard run, Gianni Smith kick (Drive: 14 plays, 79 yards, 7:43; Idaho State 28–24)

Fourth quarter

- (13:16) IDST – Hunter Hays 37-yard run, Thomas Kopcho kick (Drive: 8 plays, 80 yards, 2:51; Idaho State 35–24)
- (3:47) IDST – Thomas Kopcho 22-yard field goal (Drive: 12 plays, 71 yards, 6:35; Idaho State 38–24)

Statistics	IDST	PRST
First downs	27	21
Plays–yards	67–462	68–365
Rushes–yards	35–165	28–100
Passing yards	297	265
Passing: comp–att–int	21–32–0	26–40–1
Time of possession	28:03	31:57

Team	Category	Player	Statistics
Idaho State	Passing	Jordan Cooke	16/25, 259 yards, 1 TD
Idaho State	Rushing	Hunter Hays	10 carries, 93 yards, 2 TD
Idaho State	Receiving	Alfred Jordan Jr.	5 receptions, 133 yards
Portland State	Passing	Dante Chachere	25/39, 218 yards, 1 TD, 1 INT
Portland State	Rushing	Andrew Van Buren	12 carries, 39 yards, 1 TD
Portland State	Receiving	Marquis Spiker	6 receptions, 112 yards, 1 TD

=== at No. 6 Sacramento State ===
Idaho State Bengals (3–4) at No. 6 Sacramento State Hornets (5–2) – Game summary

Quarter	1	2	3	4	Total
Bengals	0	16	0	0	16
No. 6 Hornets	14	10	20	7	51

at Hornet Stadium • Sacramento, California

- Date: October 28
- Game time: 7:00 p.m. MDT
- Game weather: Sunny • Temperature: 65 °F (18 °C) • Wind: N at 14 miles per hour (23 km/h)
- Game attendance: 13,733
- Referee: Jeff Rink
- TV announcers (ESPN+): Jason Ross Jr. (play-by-play) and Darren Arbet (analyst)
- Box score, Recap

Game information

First quarter

- (11:17) SAC – Jared Gipson 23-yard pass from Kaiden Bennett, Zach Schreiner kick (Drive: 9 plays, 75 yards, 3:43; Sacramento State 7–0)
- (0:45) SAC – Coleman Kuntz 1-yard run, Zach Schreiner kick (Drive: 9 plays, 86 yards, 4:12; Sacramento State 14–0)

Second quarter

- (14:05) IDST – Chedon James 25-yard pass from Hunter Hays, Thomas Kopcho kick failed (Drive: 5 plays, 48 yards, 1:36; Sacramento State 14–6)
- (7:14) IDST – Thomas Kopcho 27-yard field goal (Drive: 10 plays, 71 yards, 4:14; Sacramento State 14–9)
- (5:46) IDST – Alfred Jordan Jr. 16-yard pass from Hunter Hays, Thomas Kopcho kick (Drive: 5 plays, 37 yards, 1:28; Idaho State 16–14)
- (3:13) SAC – Devin Gandy 13-yard pass from Carson Conklin, Zach Schreiner kick (Drive: 7 plays, 61 yards, 2:27; Sacramento State 21–16)
- (0:00) SAC – Zach Schreiner 30-yard field goal (Drive: 8 plays, 83 yards, 1:12; Sacramento State 24–16)

Third quarter

- (7:53) SAC – Carlos Hill 69-yard pass from Carson Conklin, two-point run failed (Drive: 2 plays, 73 yards, 0:34; Sacramento State 30–16)
- (3:04) SAC – Elijah Tau-Tolliver 4-yard run, Zach Schreiner kick (Drive: 8 plays, 35 yards, 3:34; Sacramento State 37–16)
- (1:17) SAC – Michael Johnson 8-yard run, Zach Schreiner kick (Drive: 4 plays, 29 yards, 1:16; Sacramento State 44–16)

Fourth Quarter

- (8:30) SAC – Marshel Martin 6-yard pass from Carson Conklin, Zach Schreiner kick (Drive: 12 plays, 53 yards, 6:57; Sacramento State 51–16)

Statistics	IDST	SAC
First downs	16	26
Plays–yards	75–334	81–587
Rushes–yards	19–42	49–273
Passing yards	292	314
Passing: comp–att–int	30–56–4	21–32–1
Time of possession	24:55	35:05

Team	Category	Player	Statistics
Idaho State	Passing	Hunter Hays	17/31, 193 yards, 2 TD, 2 INT
Idaho State	Rushing	Hunter Hays	7 carries, 22 yards
Idaho State	Receiving	Chedon James	10 receptions, 77 yards, 1 TD
Sacramento State	Passing	Carson Conklin	14/21, 235 yards, 3 TD
Sacramento State	Rushing	Zeke Burnett	9 carries, 143 yards
Sacramento State	Receiving	Marshel Martin	6 receptions, 103 yards, 1 TD

=== vs Weber State ===
Weber State Wildcats (3–5) vs Idaho State Bengals (3–5) – Game summary

Quarter	1	2	3	4	Total
Wildcats	0	21	0	12	33
Bengals	0	0	7	14	21

at Holt Arena • Pocatello, Idaho

- Date: November 4
- Game time: 4:00 p.m. MDT
- Game weather: None (indoor stadium)
- Game attendance: 8,233
- Referee: Kelly Holman
- TV announcers (ESPN+): Dylan Carder (play-by-play) and Kody Graves (analyst)
- Box score, Recap

Game information

First quarter

- No scoring plays

Second quarter

- (10:55) WEB – Jaden Thrower 23-yard pass from Richie Munoz, Kyle Thompson kick (Drive: 11 plays, 80 yards, 5:45; Weber State 7–0)
- (6:23) WEB – Jacob Sharp 19-yard pass from Richie Munoz, Kyle Thompson kick (Drive: 7 plays, 66 yards, 3:16; Weber State 14–0)
- (4:00) WEB – Hayden Meacham 26-yard pass from Richie Munoz, Kyle Thompson kick (Drive: 5 plays, 55 yards, 2:22; Weber State 21–0)

Third quarter

- (5:11) IDST – Hunter Hays 20-yard run, Thomas Kopcho kick (Drive: 6 plays, 85 yards, 2:57; Weber State 21–7)

Fourth quarter

- (14:51) WEB – Garrett Beck 35-yard fumble return, Kyle Thompson kick (Weber State 28–7)
- (13:33) IDST – Cyrus Wallace 35-yard pass from Jordan Cooke, Thomas Kopcho kick failed (Drive: 6 plays, 83 yards, 1:10; Weber State 28–13)
- (10:57) WEB – Jordan Cooke sacked in the end zone by Jack Kelly for a safety (Weber State 30–13)
- (7:42) WEB – Kyle Thompson 22-yard field goal (Drive: 7 plays, 45 yards, 3:15; Weber State 33–13)
- (0:25) IDST – Alfred Jordan Jr. 37-yard pass from Jordan Cooke, Christian Fredericksen pass from Jordan Cooke (Drive: 1 play, 37 yards, 0:07; Weber State 33–21)

Statistics	WEB	IDST
First downs	21	19
Plays–yards	78–406	71–324
Rushes–yards	36–184	16–-30
Passing yards	222	354
Passing: comp–att–int	26–42–1	30–55–1
Time of possession	35:40	24:20

Team	Category	Player	Statistics
Weber State	Passing	Richie Munoz	26/41, 222 yards, 3 TD, 1 INT
Weber State	Rushing	Clarence Butler	10 carries, 57 yards
Weber State	Receiving	Jacob Sharp	6 receptions, 82 yards, 1 TD
Idaho State	Passing	Jordan Cooke	23/45, 277 yards, 2 TD, 1 INT
Idaho State	Rushing	Aiden Taylor	1 carry, 6 yards
Idaho State	Receiving	Chedon James	9 receptions, 86 yards

=== vs UC Davis ===
UC Davis Aggies (5–4) vs Idaho State Bengals (3–6) – Game summary

Quarter	1	2	3	4	Total
Aggies	0	7	7	7	21
Bengals	7	0	7	0	14

at Holt Arena • Pocatello, Idaho

- Date: November 11
- Game time: 4:00 p.m. MST
- Game weather: None (indoor stadium)
- Game attendance: 7,001
- Referee: John Doe
- TV announcers (ESPN+): Dylan Carder (play-by-play) and Kody Graves (analyst)
- Box score, Recap

Game information

First quarter

- (2:19) IDST – Christian Fredericksen 7-yard pass from Hunter Hays, Thomas Kopcho kick (Drive: 12 plays, 95 yards, 5:36; Idaho State 7–0)

Second quarter

- (9:47) UCD – Lan Larison 3-yard run, Hunter Ridley kick (Drive: 8 plays, 87 yards, 4:33; Tied 7–7)

Third quarter

- (8:22) IDST – Chedon James 5-yard pass from Jordan Cooke, Thomas Kopcho kick (Drive: 5 plays, 49 yards, 1:52; Idaho State 14–7)
- (1:05) UCD – Lan Larison 12-yard run, Hunter Ridley kick (Drive: 2 plays, 17 yards, 0:48; Tied 14–14)

Fourth quarter

- (2:05) UCD – Lan Larison 23-yard run, Hunter Ridley kick (Drive: 10 plays, 92 yards, 5:18; UC Davis 21–14)

Statistics	UCD	IDST
First downs	17	19
Plays–yards	61–394	80–410
Rushes–yards	37–268	24–77
Passing yards	126	333
Passing: comp–att–int	14–24–1	33–56–2
Time of possession	32:11	27:49

Team	Category	Player	Statistics
UC Davis	Passing	Miles Hastings	14/23, 126 yards, 1 INT
UC Davis	Rushing	Lan Larison	31 carries, 264 yards, 3 TD
UC Davis	Receiving	Samuel Gbatu Jr.	4 receptions, 62 yards
Idaho State	Passing	Jordan Cooke	27/46, 297 yards, 1 TD, 2 INT
Idaho State	Rushing	Soujah Gasu	6 carries, 55 yards
Idaho State	Receiving	Chedon James	13 receptions, 108 yards, 1 TD

=== at No. 6 Idaho (rivalry) ===
Idaho State Bengals (3–7) at No. 6 Idaho Vandals (7–3) – Game summary

Quarter	1	2	3	4	Total
Bengals	0	0	7	14	21
No. 6 Vandals	28	28	0	7	63

at Kibbie Dome • Moscow, Idaho

- Date: November 18
- Game time: 5:00 p.m. MST
- Game weather: None (indoor stadium)
- Game attendance: 9,854
- Referee: Gregg Wilson
- TV announcers (ESPN+): Dennis Patchin (play-by-play) and Ryan Phillips (analyst)
- Box score, Recap

Game information

First quarter

- (10:00) IDHO – Anthony Woods 7-yard run, Ricardo Chavez kick (Drive: 10 plays, 65 yards, 4:53; Idaho 7–0)
- (6:07) IDHO – Hayden Hatten 24-yard pass from Jack Layne, Ricardo Chavez kick (Drive: 5 plays, 58 yards, 2:27; Idaho 14–0)
- (3:06) IDHO – Jordan Dwyer 45-yard pass from Jack Layne, Ricardo Chavez kick (Drive: 2 plays, 75 yards, 0:42; Idaho 21–0)
- (1:42) IDHO – Jermaine Jackson 79-yard punt return, Ricardo Chavez kick (Idaho 28–0)

Second quarter

- (14:23) IDHO – Jake Cox 3-yard pass from Jack Layne, Ricardo Chavez kick (Drive: 4 plays, 28 yards, 1:49; Idaho 35–0)
- (12:12) IDHO – Jermaine Jackson 15-yard pass from Jack Layne, Ricardo Chavez kick (Drive: 3 plays, 60 yards, 1:12; Idaho 42–0)
- (8:38) IDHO – Anthony Woods 13-yard pass from Jack Layne, Ricardo Chavez kick (Drive: 5 plays, 33 yards, 2:16; Idaho 49–0)
- (3:04) IDHO – Hayden Hatten 11-yard pass from Jack Layne, Ricardo Chavez kick (Drive: 10 plays, 79 yards, 4:48; Idaho 56–0)

Third quarter

- (6:14) IDST – Christian Fredericksen 11-yard pass from Jackson Sharman, Thomas Kopcho kick (Drive: 7 plays, 58 yards, 3:00; Idaho 56–7)

Fourth quarter

- (10:34) IDST – Adam Watts 5-yard pass from Jackson Sharman, Thomas Kopcho kick (Drive: 3 plays, 61 yards, 1:09; Idaho 56–14)
- (8:02) IDHO – Jack Schuster 18-yard pass from Jack Wagner, Ricardo Chavez kick (Drive: 4 plays, 54 yards, 2:25; Idaho 63–14)
- (4:40) IDST – Cyrus Wallace 28-yard pass from Matthew Cavallaro, Thomas Kopcho kick (Drive: 9 plays, 75 yards, 3:22; Idaho 63–21)

Statistics	IDST	IDHO
First downs	14	30
Plays–yards	62–304	77–579
Rushes–yards	22–50	46–263
Passing yards	254	316
Passing: comp–att–int	21–40–4	24–31–1
Time of possession	21:16	38:44

Team	Category	Player	Statistics
Idaho State	Passing	Jackson Sharman	11/21, 124 yards, 2 TD, 1 INT
Idaho State	Rushing	Soujah Gasu	6 carries, 24 yards
Idaho State	Receiving	Chedon James	10 receptions, 145 yards
Idaho	Passing	Jack Layne	20/26, 275 yards, 6 TD
Idaho	Rushing	Anthony Woods	18 carries, 115 yards, 1 TD
Idaho	Receiving	Jordan Dwyer	3 receptions, 100 yards, 1 TD
