= 2023 Eastern Washington Eagles football team =

American college football season

2023 Eastern Washington Eagles football
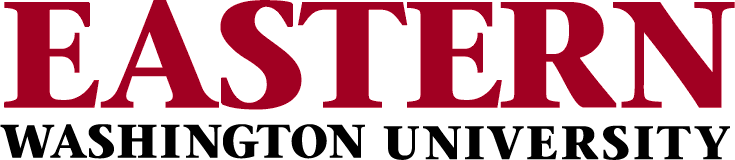
- Conference: Big Sky Conference
- Record: 4–7 (3–5 Big Sky)
- Head coach: Aaron Best (7th season)
- Offensive coordinator: Jim Chapin (2nd season)
- Defensive coordinator: Jeff Copp (2nd season)
- Home stadium: Roos Field

2023 Big Sky Conference football standings
	Conf.			Overall
Team	W		L	W		L
No. 2 Montana $^	7	–	1	13	–	2
No. 8 Idaho ^	6	–	2	9	–	4
No. 9 Montana State ^	6	–	2	8	–	4
Northern Arizona	5	–	3	5	–	6
No. 24 UC Davis	5	–	3	7	–	4
No. 13 Sacramento State ^	4	–	4	8	–	5
Portland State	4	–	4	5	–	6
Weber State	4	–	4	6	–	5
Eastern Washington	3	–	5	4	–	7
Idaho State	3	–	5	3	–	8
Cal Poly	1	–	7	3	–	8
Northern Colorado	0	–	8	0	–	11
$ – Conference champion; ^ – FCS playoff participant; Rankings from STATS Poll

The 2023 Eastern Washington Eagles football team represented Eastern Washington University as a member of the Big Sky Conference during the 2023 NCAA Division I FCS football season. Led by seventh-year head coach Aaron Best, the Eagles played their home games at Roos Field in Cheney, Washington.

== Preseason ==
=== Polls ===
On July 23, 2023, during the virtual Big Sky Kickoff, the Eagles were predicted to finish seventh in the Big Sky by both the coaches and media.

== Schedule ==
Date	Time	Opponent	Rank	Site	TV	Result	Attendance
September 2	12:30 p.m.	vs. No. 2 North Dakota State*		U.S. Bank Stadium; Minneapolis, MN	ESPN+	L 10–35	22,546
September 9	6:00 p.m.	at Fresno State*		Valley Children's Stadium; Fresno, CA	UniMás / MW Network	L 31–34 ^{2OT}	41,031
September 16	1:00 p.m.	No. 19 Southeastern Louisiana*		Roos Field; Cheney, WA	ESPN+	W 40–29	4,103
September 23	7:00 p.m.	at No. 15 UC Davis		UC Davis Health Stadium; Davis, CA	ESPN+	W 27–24	14,724
September 30	1:00 p.m.	No. 4 Idaho	No. 19	Roos Field; Cheney, WA	ESPN+	L 36–44	8,347
October 14	3:00 p.m.	at Idaho State	No. 21	Holt Arena; Pocatello, ID	ESPN+	L 41–42	6,763
October 21	4:00 p.m.	Weber State^{†}		Roos Field; Cheney, WA	ESPN+	W 31–23	7,514
October 28	1:00 p.m.	at Portland State		Hillsboro Stadium; Hillsboro, OR (The Dam Cup)	ESPN+	L 35–47	3,189
November 4	1:00 p.m.	Cal Poly		Roos Field; Cheney, WA	ESPN+	W 48–13	4,345
November 11	12:00 p.m.	at No. 5 Montana State		Bobcat Stadium; Bozeman, MT	ESPN+	L 14–57	20,897
November 18	1:00 p.m.	Northern Arizona		Roos Field; Cheney, WA	ESPN+	L 42–49	4,078
*Non-conference game; ^{†}Homecoming; Rankings from STATS Poll released prior to the game; All times are in Pacific time

== Game summaries ==
=== North Dakota State ===
Eastern Washington Eagles (0–0) vs North Dakota State Bison (0–0)

Quarter	1	2	3	4	Total
Eagles	7	0	0	3	10
No. 2 Bison	14	7	7	7	35

at U.S. Bank Stadium, Minneapolis, MN

- Date: September 2, 2023
- Game time: 12:30 p.m. (PT)
- Game weather: Indoors; 70 °F (21 °C)
- Game attendance: 22,546
- Referee: Jason Berg
- TV announcers (ABC ND/ESPN+): Dom Izzo, Kyle Emanuel, Logan Campbell

Game information

First quarter

- (9:23) NDSU – Joe Stoffel 7-yard pass from Cam Miller, Griffin Crosa kick (Drive: 8 plays, 80 yards, 3:12; North Dakota State 7–0)
- (7:02) NDSU – TaMerik Williams 54-yard run, Griffin Crosa kick (Drive: 3 plays, 72 yards, 0:46; North Dakota State 14–0)
- (4:55) EWU – Nolan Ulm 34-yard pass from Kekoa Visperas, Soren McKee kick (Drive: 7 plays, 75 yards, 2:07; North Dakota State 14–7)

Second quarter

- (10:10) NDSU – Cole Payton 70-yard run, Griffin Crosa kick (Drive: 4 plays, 92 yards, 2:10; North Dakota State 21–7)

Third quarter

- (2:56) NDSU – Cam Miller 14-yard run, Griffin Crosa kick (Drive: 9 plays, 70 yards, 4:42; North Dakota State 28–7)

Fourth quarter

- (8:30) NDSU – Joe Stoffel 3-yard pass from Cam Miller, Griffin Crosa kick (Drive: 13 plays, 86 yards, 7:16; North Dakota State 35–7)
- (4:01) EWU – Soren McKee 36-yard field goal (Drive: 12 plays, 61 yards, 4:23; North Dakota State 35–10)

Statistics	Eastern Washington	North Dakota State
First downs	16	22
Plays–yards	67–339	67–513
Rushes–yards	28–72	39–337
Passing yards	267	176
Passing: comp–att–int	23–39–1	19–28–0
Time of possession	26:13	30:35

Team	Category	Player	Statistics
Eastern Washington	Passing	Kekoa Visperas	23/39, 266 yds, TD, INT
Eastern Washington	Rushing	Michael Wortham	5 car, 41 yds
Eastern Washington	Receiving	Efton Chism III	7 rec, 74 yds
North Dakota State	Passing	Cam Miller	18/25, 174 yds, 2 TD
North Dakota State	Rushing	Cole Payton	6 car, 104 yds, TD
North Dakota State	Receiving	Zach Mathis	4 rec, 53 yds

=== At Fresno State ===
Eastern Washington Eagles (0–1) vs Fresno State Bulldogs (1–0)

Quarter	1	2	3	4	OT	2OT	Total
Eagles	3	0	14	7	7	0	31
Bulldogs	7	7	7	3	7	3	34

at Valley Children's Stadium • Fresno, California

- Date: Saturday, September 9, 2023
- Game time: 6:00 p.m. PDT
- Game weather: Sunny • Temperature: 95 °F (35 °C) • Wind: NW 6mph
- Game attendance: 41,031
- Referee: Patrick Foy
- TV announcers (UniMás / MW Network / KTFF / MWDN): Jessi Losada (play-by-play), Jaime Motta (analyst), & Alejandro Luna (sideline)/Paul Loeffler (play-by-play), Pat Hill (analyst), & Cam Worrell (sideline)

Game information

First quarter

- (11:34) FRES – Elijah Gilliam 5-yard run, Dylan Lynch kick (Drive: 3 plays, 42 yards, 1:14; Fresno State 7–0)
- (2:40) EWU – Soren McKee 24-yard field goal (Drive: 21 plays, 85 yards, 8:51; Fresno State 7–3)

Second quarter

- (13:31) FRES – Jake Boust 6-yard pass from Mikey Keene, Dylan Lynch kick (Drive: 4 plays, 20 yards, 1:24; Fresno State 14–3)

Third quarter

- (11:15) EWU – Michael Wortham 12-yard run, Soren McKee kick (Drive: 7 plays, 62 yards, 2:21; Fresno State 14–10)
- (8:01) FRES – Erik Brooks 29-yard pass from Mikey Keene, Dylan Lynch kick (Drive: 8 plays, 75 yards, 3:14; Fresno State 21–10)
- (3:06) EWU – Efton Chism III 2-yard pass from Michael Wortham, Soren McKee kick (Drive: 11 plays, 75 yards, 4:55; Fresno State 21–17)

Fourth quarter

- (10:01) EWU – Justice Jackson 33-yard run, Soren McKee kick (Drive: 10 plays, 74 yards, 3:28; Eastern Washington 24–21)
- (6:44) FRES – Dylan Lynch 44-yard field goal (Drive: 7 plays, 44 yards, 3:17; Tied 24–24)

First overtime

- (0:00) EWU – Anthony Stell, Jr. 1-yard pass from Kekoa Visperas, Soren Mckee kick (Drive: 4 plays, 25 yards; Eastern Washington 31–24)
- (0:00) FRES – Elijah Gilliam 1-yard run, Abraham Montano kick (Drive: 4 plays, 25 yards; Tied 31–31)

Second overtime

- (0:00) FRES – Dylan Lynch 25-yard field goal (Drive: 4 plays, 18 yards; Fresno State 34–31)

Statistics	EWU	FRES
First downs	22	21
Plays–yards	84–336	73–364
Rushes–yards	38–133	34–141
Passing yards	233	223
Passing: comp–att–int	27–46–1	23–39–1
Time of possession	32:09	29:03

Team	Category	Player	Statistics
Eastern Washington	Passing	Kekoa Visperas	23/41, 198 yards, TD, INT
Eastern Washington	Rushing	Justice Jackson	11 rushes, 79 yards, TD
Eastern Washington	Receiving	Anthony Stell, Jr.	7 receptions, 77 yards, TD
Fresno State	Passing	Mikey Keene	23/39, 223 yards, 2 TD, INT
Fresno State	Rushing	Elijah Gilliam	20 rushes, 86 yards, 2 TD
Fresno State	Receiving	Erik Brooks	8 receptions, 95 yards, TD

=== Southeastern Louisiana ===
Southeastern Louisiana Lions (0–2) vs Eastern Washington Eagles (0–2)

Quarter	1	2	3	4	Total
No. 19 Lions	7	7	7	8	29
Eagles	7	10	3	20	40

at Roos Field • Cheney, Washington

- Date: Saturday, September 16, 2023
- Game time: 1:00 p.m. PDT
- Game weather: Sunny • Temperature: 82 °F (28 °C) • Wind: N 4 mph
- Game attendance: 4,103
- Referee: Spencer Mumford
- TV announcers (SWX NW/ESPN+): Dennis Patchin (play-by-play) and Greg Peach (analyst)

Game information

First quarter

- (13:28) SLU – Zachary Clement 7-yard run, Riley Callaghan kick (Drive: 4 plays, 44 yards, 1:22; Southeastern Louisiana 7–0)
- (7:35) EWU – Efton Chism III 3-yard pass from Kekoa Visperas, Soren McKee kick (Drive: 15 plays, 75 yards, 5:53; Tied 7–7)

Second quarter

- (7:35) SLU – Bauer Sharp 3-yard pass from Eli Sawyer, Riley Callaghan kick (Drive: 6 plays, 76 yards, 2:54; Southeastern Louisiana 14–7)
- (7:35) EWU – Soren McKee 26-yard field goal (Drive: 14 plays, 70 yards, 4:58; Southeastern Louisiana 14–10)
- (7:35) EWU – Nolan Ulm 5-yard pass from Kekoa Visperas, Soren McKee kick (Drive: 7 plays, 59 yards, 0:51; Eastern Washington 17–14)

Third quarter

- (6:17) EWU – Soren McKee 39-yard field goal (Drive: 5 plays, 19 yards, 1:42; Eastern Washington 20–14)
- (0:05) SLU – Bauer Sharp 1-yard pass from Zachary Clement, Riley Callaghan kick (Drive: 9 plays, 30 yards, 4:02; Southeastern Louisiana 21–20)

Fourth quarter

- (11:22) EWU – Justice Jackson 7-yard run (Drive: 10 plays, 85 yards, 3:38; Eastern Washington 26–21)
- (5:39) SLU – Jacob Logan 19-yard pass from Zachary Clement, Darius Lewis kick (Drive: 11 plays, 75 yards, 5:43; Southeastern Louisiana 29–26)
- (1:34) EWU – Tuna Altahir 1-yard run, Soren McKee kick (Drive: 10 plays, 75 yards, 4:05; Eastern Washington 33–29)
- (1:26) EWU – Marlon Jones Jr. 34-yard interception, Soren McKee kick (Drive: Eastern Washington 40–29)

Statistics	SELA	EWU
First downs	14	37
Plays–yards	293	530
Rushes–yards	11	11
Passing yards	3	23
Passing: comp–att–int	13–23–1	34–48–1
Time of possession	25:42	34:18

Team	Category	Player	Statistics
Southeastern Louisiana	Passing	Zachary Clement	10/19, 80 yards, 2 TD, INT
Southeastern Louisiana	Rushing	Harlan Dixon	18 carries, 71 yards
Southeastern Louisiana	Receiving	Darius Lewis	4 receptions, 75 yards
Eastern Washington	Passing	Kekoa Visperas	33/47, 349 yards, 2 TD, INT
Eastern Washington	Rushing	Justice Jackson	12 carries, 91 yards, TD
Eastern Washington	Receiving	Efton Chism III	9 receptions, 103 yards, TD

=== At No. 15 UC Davis ===
UC Davis Aggies (2–1) vs Eastern Washington Eagles (1–2)

Quarter	1	2	3	4	Total
Aggies	0	0	0	0	0
Eagles	0	0	0	0	0

at UC Davis Health Stadium • Davis, CA

- Date: Saturday, September 23, 2023
- Game time: 10:00 p.m. PDT
- Game weather: • Temperature: • Wind:
- Game attendance: 14,724
- TV announcers (ESPN+): Scott Marsh, Scott Gordon

=== No. 4 Idaho ===
No. 4 Idaho Vandals (3–1) at No. 19 Eastern Washington (2–2) – Game summary

Quarter	1	2	3	4	Total
No. 4 Vandals	7	14	10	13	44
No. 19 Eagles	7	14	7	8	36

at Roos Field • Cheney, WA

- Date: September 30, 2023
- Game time: 1:00 p.m. PDT
- Game attendance: 8,347
- TV announcers (SWX NW/ESPN+): Dennis Patchin, Greg Peach

=== At Idaho State ===
No. 21 Eastern Washington Eagles (2–3) vs Idaho State Bengals (1–4)

Quarter	1	2	3	4	Total
No. 21 Eagles	14	21	6	0	41
Bengals	0	14	7	21	42

at Holt Arena • Pocatello, Idaho

- Date: Saturday, October 14, 2023
- Game time: 3:00 p.m. PDT
- Game weather: None (indoor stadium)
- Game attendance: 6,763
- Referee: Scott Root
- TV announcers (ESPN+): Dylan Carder (play-by-play) and Kody Graves (analyst)

Game information

First quarter

- (4:58) EWU – Efton Chism III 13-yard pass from Kekoa Visperas, Soren McKee kick (Drive: 6 plays, 80 yards, 2:27; Eastern Washington 7–0)
- (1:08) EWU – Tuna Altahir 8-yard run, Soren McKee kick (Drive: 4 plays, 57 yards, 1:13; Eastern Washington 14–0)

Second quarter

- (14:30) EWU – Michael Wortham 23-yard run, Soren McKee kick (Drive: 4 plays, 69 yards, 1:30; Eastern Washington 21–0)
- (12:53) IDST – Soujah Gasu 38-yard run, Yoann Kinanga kick (Drive: 4 plays, 75 yards, 1:37; Eastern Washington 21–7)
- (8:35) EWU – Efton Chism III 10-yard pass from Kekoa Visperas, Soren McKee kick (Drive: 12 plays, 72 yards, 4:10; Eastern Washington 28–7)
- (1:15) EWU – Miles Williams 32-yard pass from Kekoa Visperas, Soren McKee kick (Drive: 2 plays, 41 yards, 0:27; Eastern Washington 35–7)
- (0:04) IDST – Chedon James 2-yard pass from Hunter Hays, Thomas Kopcho kick (Drive: 7 plays, 75 yards, 1:11; Eastern Washington 35–14)

Third quarter

- (5:11) EWU – Soren McKee 32-yard field goal (Drive: 13 plays, 61 yards, 6:14; Eastern Washington 38–14)
- (1:48) EWU – Soren McKee 30-yard field goal (Drive: 4 plays, -5 yards, 1:00; Eastern Washington 41–14)
- (0:46) IDST – Cyrus Wallace 15-yard pass from Jordan Cooke, Thomas Kopcho kick (Drive: 2 plays, 75 yards, 1:02; Eastern Washington 41–21)

Fourth quarter

- (10:06) IDST – Soujah Gasu 1-yard run, Thomas Kopcho kick (Drive: 6 plays, 90 yards, 2:04; Eastern Washington 41–28)
- (3:28) IDST – Aaron Blancas 25-yard pass from Jordan Cooke kick (Drive: 7 plays, 68 yards, 2:23; Eastern Washington 41–35)
- (0:52) IDST – Hunter Hays 1-yard run, Thomas Kopcho kick (Drive: 7 plays, 36 yards, 2:31; Idaho State 42–41)

Statistics	EWU	IDST
First downs	32	29
Plays–yards	79–553	75–572
Rushes–yards	32–150	20–49
Passing yards	403	523
Passing: comp–att–int	33–47–0	38–55–2
Time of possession	33:29	26:31

Team	Category	Player	Statistics
Eastern Washington	Passing	Kekoa Visperas	33/47, 403 yards, 3 TD
Eastern Washington	Rushing	Michael Wortham	6 carries, 69 yards, 1 TD
Eastern Washington	Receiving	Efton Chism III	13 receptions, 161 yards, 2 TD
Idaho State	Passing	Jordan Cooke	25/39, 389 yards, 2 TD, 1 INT
Idaho State	Rushing	Soujah Gasu	8 carries, 72 yards, 1 TD
Idaho State	Receiving	Chedon James	15 receptions, 206 yards, 1 TD

=== Weber State ===
Weber State Wildcats (0–0) vs Eastern Washington Eagles (0–0)

Quarter	1	2	3	4	Total
Wildcats	0	0	0	0	0
Eagles	0	0	0	0	0

- Date: Saturday, October 21, 2023
- Game time: 7:00 p.m. PDT
- Game weather: • Temperature: • Wind:
- Game attendance: 7,514
- TV announcers (SWX NW): Dennis Patchin, Adam Shackleford

=== At Portland State ===
Portland State Vikings (0–0) vs Eastern Washington Eagles (0–0)

Quarter	1	2	3	4	Total
Vikings	0	0	0	0	0
Eagles	0	0	0	0	0

- Date: Saturday, October 28, 2023
- Game time: 4:00 p.m. PDT
- Game weather: • Temperature: • Wind:
- Game attendance: 3,189
- TV announcers (ESPN+): Matt Richert, Scott Hermo

=== Cal Poly ===
Cal Poly Mustangs (0–0) vs Eastern Washington Eagles (0–0)

Quarter	1	2	3	4	Total
Mustangs	0	0	0	0	0
Eagles	0	0	0	0	0

- Date: Saturday, November 4, 2023
- Game time: 4:00 p.m. PDT
- Game weather: • Temperature: • Wind:
- Game attendance: 4,345
- TV announcers (ESPN+): Dennis Patchin, Greg Peach

=== At No. 5 Montana State ===
No. 5 Montana State Bobcats (0–0) vs Eastern Washington Eagles (0–0)

Quarter	1	2	3	4	Total
No. 5 Bobcats	0	0	0	0	0
Eagles	0	0	0	0	0

- Date: Saturday, November 11, 2023
- Game time: 3:00 p.m. PDT
- Game weather: • Temperature: • Wind:
- Game attendance: 20,897
- TV announcers (MTN-CBS): Jay Kohn, Marty Mornhinweg, Kyle Hansen

=== Northern Arizona ===
Northern Arizona Lumberjacks (0–0) vs Eastern Washington Eagles (0–0)

Quarter	1	2	3	4	Total
Lumberjacks	0	0	0	0	0
Eagles	0	0	0	0	0

- Date: Saturday, November 18, 2023
- Game time: 10:00 p.m. PDT
- Game weather: • Temperature: • Wind:
- Game attendance: 4,078
- TV announcers (SWX NW): Austin Getz, Bill Ames
