= 2023 Portland State Vikings football team =

American college football season

2023 Portland State Vikings football
- Conference: Big Sky Conference
- Record: 5–6 (4–4 Big Sky)
- Head coach: Bruce Barnum (9th season)
- Offensive coordinator: A. C. Patterson (1st season)
- Offensive scheme: West Coast
- Co-defensive coordinators: Colin Fry (1st season); Mark Rhea (1st season)
- Base defense: 4–3
- Home stadium: Hillsboro Stadium

2023 Big Sky Conference football standings
	Conf.			Overall
Team	W		L	W		L
No. 2 Montana $^	7	–	1	13	–	2
No. 8 Idaho ^	6	–	2	9	–	4
No. 9 Montana State ^	6	–	2	8	–	4
Northern Arizona	5	–	3	5	–	6
No. 24 UC Davis	5	–	3	7	–	4
No. 13 Sacramento State ^	4	–	4	8	–	5
Portland State	4	–	4	5	–	6
Weber State	4	–	4	6	–	5
Eastern Washington	3	–	5	4	–	7
Idaho State	3	–	5	3	–	8
Cal Poly	1	–	7	3	–	8
Northern Colorado	0	–	8	0	–	11
$ – Conference champion; ^ – FCS playoff participant; Rankings from STATS Poll

The 2023 Portland State Vikings football team represented Portland State University as a member of the Big Sky Conference during the 2023 NCAA Division I FCS football season. Led by ninth-year head coach Bruce Barnum, the Vikings played their home games off campus at Hillsboro Stadium in Hillsboro, Oregon, a suburb west of Portland.

== Preseason ==
=== Polls ===
On July 23, 2023, during the virtual Big Sky Kickoff, the Vikings were predicted to finish eighth in the Big Sky by the coaches and ninth by the media.

== Schedule ==
Date	Time	Opponent	Site	TV	Result	Attendance
September 2	12:00 p.m.	at No. 15 (FBS) Oregon*	Autzen Stadium; Eugene, OR	P12N	L 7–81	45,723
September 9	1:00 p.m.	at Wyoming*	War Memorial Stadium; Laramie, WY	MW Network	L 17–31	22,121
September 16	1:00 p.m.	North American*	Hillsboro Stadium; Hillsboro, OR	ESPN+	W 91–0	1,411
September 23	1:00 p.m.	Cal Poly	Hillsboro Stadium; Hillsboro, OR	ESPN+	W 59–21	1,672
September 30	1:00 p.m.	at No. 3 Montana State	Bobcat Stadium; Bozeman, MT	ESPN+	L 22–38	22,017
October 14	2:00 p.m.	at Northern Arizona	Walkup Skydome; Flagstaff, AZ	ESPN+	W 45–21	9,713
October 21	1:00 p.m.	Idaho State	Hillsboro Stadium; Hillsboro, OR	ESPN+	L 24–38	2,174
October 28	1:00 p.m.	Eastern Washington	Hillsboro Stadium; Hillsboro, OR (The Dam Cup)	ESPN+	W 47–35	3,189
November 4	4:00 p.m.	at UC Davis	UC Davis Health Stadium; Davis, CA	ESPN+	L 23–37	8,945
November 11	6:00 p.m.	No. 3 Montana	Hillsboro Stadium; Hillsboro, OR	ESPN+	L 10–34	4,578
November 18	11:00 a.m.	at Northern Colorado	Nottingham Field; Greeley, CO	ESPN+	W 27–23	2,578
*Non-conference game; Rankings from STATS Poll released prior to the game; All times are in Pacific time

== Game summaries ==
=== at No. 15 (FBS) Oregon ===
Portland State Vikings (0–0) at No. 15 (FBS) Oregon Ducks (0–0)

Quarter	1	2	3	4	Total
Portland State	7	0	0	0	7
No. 15 (FBS) Oregon	22	28	17	14	81

at Autzen Stadium

- Date: September 2
- Game time: 3:00 p.m. EST/12:00 p.m. PST
- Game weather: Sunny • Temperature: 73 °F (23 °C) • Wind: 3 mph W
- Game attendance: 45,723
- Referee: Justin Elliott
- TV announcers (Pac-12 Network): Roxy Bernstein (play-by-play) and Lincoln Kennedy (analyst)

Game information

First quarter

- 11:01 ORE - Troy Franklin 13-yard pass from Bo Nix (Terrance Ferguson run for two-point conversion) - 8-0 Oregon, Drive: 7 plays, 66 yards, 2:34
- 7:01 PRST - Chance Miller 9-yard pass from Dante Chachere (Gianni Smith kick) - 8-7 Oregon, Drive: 9 plays, 75 yards, 4:00
- 5:53 ORE - Bucky Irving 52-yard run (Camden Lewis kick) - 15-7 Oregon, Drive: 3 plays, 75 yards, 1:08
- 2:14 ORE - Troy Franklin 32-yard pass from Bo Nix (Camden Lewis kick) - 22-7 Oregon, Drive: 6 plays, 57 yards, 2:02

Second quarter

- 11:11 ORE - Jordan James 9-yard run (Camden Lewis kick) - 29-7 Oregon, Drive: 4 plays, 60 yards, 1:37
- 10:42 ORE - Jordan James 4-yard run (Camden Lewis kick) - 36-7 Oregon, Drive: 4 plays, 13 yards, 0:25
- 5:56 ORE - Bucky Irving 56-yard run (Camden Lewis kick) - 43-7 Oregon, Drive: 5 plays, 83 yards, 2:06
- 1:14 ORE - Jordan James 9-yard run (Camden Lewis kick) - 50-7 Oregon, Drive: 7 plays, 73 yards, 3:18

Third quarter

- 14:09 ORE - Gary Bryant Jr. 10-yard pass from Bo Nix (Grant Meadors kick) - 57-7 Oregon, Drive: 3 plays, 75 yards, 0:51
- 9:56 ORE - Gary Bryant Jr. 21-yard pass from Ty Thompson (Grant Meadors kick) - 64-7 Oregon, Drive: 6 plays, 70 yards, 2:48
- 2:08 ORE - Camden Lewis 41-yard field goal - 67-7 Oregon, Drive: 11 plays, 47 yards, 5:43

Fourth quarter

- 11:12 ORE - Dante Dowdell 3-yard run (Grant Meadors kick) - 74-7 Oregon, Drive: 9 plays, 80 yards, 3:54
- 2:04 ORE - Jayden Limar 17-yard run (Grant Meadors kick) - 81-7 Oregon, Drive: 5 plays, 41 yards, 2:46

Statistics	Portland State	No. 15 Oregon
First downs	9	37
Plays–yards	57–200	72–729
Rushes–yards	37–148	34–348
Passing yards	52	381
Passing: comp–att–int	8–20–0	33–38–0
Time of possession	28:37	31:23

Team	Category	Player	Statistics
Portland State	Passing	Dante Chachere	5/14, 35 yards, 1 TD
Portland State	Rushing	Dante Chachere	6 carries, 53 yards
Portland State	Receiving	Jaden Casey	3 receptions, 17 yards
No. 15 Oregon	Passing	Bo Nix	23/27, 287 yards, 3 TD
No. 15 Oregon	Rushing	Bucky Irving	4 carries, 119 yards, 2 TD
No. 15 Oregon	Receiving	Troy Franklin	7 receptions, 106 yards, 2 TD

=== at Wyoming ===
Portland State Vikings at Wyoming Cowboys – Game summary

Quarter	1	2	3	4	Total
Vikings	0	10	0	7	17
Cowboys	14	7	10	0	31

at War Memorial Stadium, Laramie, Wyoming

- Date: September 9
- Game time: 2:00 p.m. MDT
- Game weather: Sunny, 75 °F (24 °C)
- Game attendance: 22,121
- Referee: Christian Watson
- TV announcers (Mountain West Network): Chris Sylvester, Jared Petrino, and Bridget Howard
- Box score, Recap

Game information

First quarter

- WYO – Jamari Ferrell 1-yard run (John Hoyland kick), 8:03. Cowboys 7–0. Drive: 5 plays, 34 yards, 2:15.
- WYO – Ayir Asante 64-yard pass from Andrew Peasley (John Hoyland kick), 2:51. Cowboys 14–0. Drive: 3 plays, 67 yards, 1:28.

Second quarter

- PSU – Dante Chachere 2-yard run (Gianni Smith kick), 8:50. Cowboys 14–7. Drive: 18 plays, 75 yards, 9:01.
- WYO – Wyatt Wieland 29-yard pass from Andrew Peasley (John Hoyland kick), 4:52. Cowboys 21–7. Drive: 3 plays, 49 yards, 1:28.
- PSU – Gianni Smith 45-yard field goal, 0:16. Cowboys 21–10. Drive: 5 plays, 17 yards, 0:33.

Third quarter

- WYO – John Hoyland 56-yard field goal, 6:42. Cowboys 24–10. Drive: 11 plays, 41 yards, 5:54.
- WYO – Ayir Asante 14-yard pass from Andrew Peasley (John Hoyland kick), 1:55. Cowboys 31–10. Drive: 7 plays, 67 yards, 3:21.

Fourth quarter

- PSU – Maclaine Griffin 10-yard pass from Dante Chachere (Gianni Smith kick), 7:03. Cowboys 31–17. Drive: 11 plays, 54 yards, 5:18.

Top passers

- PSU – Dante Chachere – 22/38, 214 yards, TD, INT
- WYO – Andrew Peasley – 11/16, 201 yards, 3 TD, INT

Top rushers

- PSU – Quincy Craig – 12 rushes, 54 yards
- WYO – Sam Scott – 11 rushes, 70 yards

Top receivers

- PSU – Jermaine Braddock – 7 receptions, 61 yards
- WYO – Ayir Asante – 2 receptions, 78 yards, 2 TD
