= 2023 Montana Grizzlies football team =

American college football season

2023 Montana Grizzlies football

Big Sky champion

NCAA Division I Football Championship Game, L 3–23 vs. South Dakota State
- Conference: Big Sky Conference

Ranking
- STATS: No. 2
- FCS Coaches: No. 2
- Record: 13–2 (7–1 Big Sky)
- Head coach: Bobby Hauck (13th season)
- Offensive coordinator: Brent Pease (1st season)
- Offensive scheme: Multiple
- Defensive coordinator: Ronnie Bradford (1st season)
- Base defense: 3–3–5
- Home stadium: Washington–Grizzly Stadium

2023 Big Sky Conference football standings
	Conf.			Overall
Team	W		L	W		L
No. 2 Montana $^	7	–	1	13	–	2
No. 8 Idaho ^	6	–	2	9	–	4
No. 9 Montana State ^	6	–	2	8	–	4
Northern Arizona	5	–	3	5	–	6
No. 24 UC Davis	5	–	3	7	–	4
No. 13 Sacramento State ^	4	–	4	8	–	5
Portland State	4	–	4	5	–	6
Weber State	4	–	4	6	–	5
Eastern Washington	3	–	5	4	–	7
Idaho State	3	–	5	3	–	8
Cal Poly	1	–	7	3	–	8
Northern Colorado	0	–	8	0	–	11
$ – Conference champion; ^ – FCS playoff participant; Rankings from STATS Poll

The 2023 Montana Grizzlies football team represented the University of Montana as a member of the Big Sky Conference during the 2023 NCAA Division I FCS football season. The Grizzlies were led by head coach Bobby Hauck in the sixth season of his current stint and the thirteenth overall, as he was head coach from 2003 to 2009. The team played their home games at Washington–Grizzly Stadium in Missoula, Montana. The Montana Grizzlies football team drew an average home attendance of 26,269 in 2023.

== Preseason ==
=== Polls ===
On July 23, 2023, during the virtual Big Sky Kickoff, the Grizzlies were predicted to finish sixth in the Big Sky by the coaches and third by the media.

=== Preseason All–Big Sky team ===
The Grizzlies had five players selected to the preseason all-Big Sky team.

Offense Hunter Mayginnes – OL

Defense Alex Gubner – DT

Levi Janacaro – LB

Special Teams Junior Bergen – PR

Trevin Gradney – ST

== Schedule ==
Date	Time	Opponent	Rank	Site	TV	Result	Attendance
September 2	12:00 p.m.	Butler*	No. 14	Washington-Grizzly Stadium; Missoula, MT	KTMF/ESPN+	W 35–20	25,430
September 9	7:00 p.m.	at Utah Tech*	No. 13	Greater Zion Stadium; St. George, UT	ESPN+	W 43–13	5,766
September 16	6:00 p.m.	No. 1 (D-II) Ferris State*	No. 12	Washington-Grizzly Stadium; Missoula, MT	KTMF/ESPN+	W 17–10	26,978
September 23	2:00 p.m.	at Northern Arizona	No. 13	Walkup Skydome; Flagstaff, AZ	KPAX/ESPN+	L 14–28	6,428
September 30	2:00 p.m.	Idaho State^{†}	No. 18	Washington-Grizzly Stadium; Missoula, MT	KPAX/ESPN+	W 28–20	26,678
October 7	5:00 p.m.	at No. 20 UC Davis	No. 17	UC Davis Health Stadium; Davis, CA	KPAX/ESPN+	W 31–23	9,576
October 14	8:30 p.m.	at No. 3 Idaho	No. 16	Kibbie Dome; Moscow, ID (Little Brown Stein)	ESPN2	W 23–21	14,218
October 28	1:00 p.m.	Northern Colorado	No. 7	Washington-Grizzly Stadium; Missoula, MT	KPAX/ESPN+	W 40–0	25,463
November 4	6:00 p.m.	No. 7 Sacramento State	No. 4	Washington-Grizzly Stadium; Missoula, MT	KPAX/ESPN+	W 34–7	25,888
November 11	8:00 p.m.	at Portland State	No. 3	Hillsboro Stadium; Hillsboro, OR	KPAX/ESPN+	W 34–10	4,578
November 18	12:00 p.m.	No. 4 Montana State	No. 3	Washington-Grizzly Stadium; Missoula, MT (rivalry)	KPAX/ESPN+	W 37–7	27,178
December 2	7:00 p.m.	No. 11 Delaware*	No. 2	Washington-Grizzly Stadium; Missoula, MT (NCAA Division I Second Round)	ESPN+	W 49–19	20,580
December 8	7:00 p.m.	No. 7 Furman*	No. 2	Washington-Grizzly Stadium; Missoula, MT (NCAA Division I Quarterfinal)	ESPN2	W 35–28 ^{OT}	20,884
December 16	2:30 p.m.	No. 8 North Dakota State*	No. 2	Washington-Grizzly Stadium; Missoula, MT (NCAA Division I Semifinal)	ESPN2/ESPN+	W 31–29 ^{2OT}	26,544
January 7, 2024	12:00 p.m.	vs. No. 1 South Dakota State*	No. 2	Toyota Stadium; Frisco, TX (NCAA Division I Championship Game)	ABC	L 3–23	19,512
*Non-conference game; ^{†}Homecoming; Rankings from STATS Poll released prior to the game; All times are in Mountain time

== Game summaries ==
=== Butler ===
	1	2	3	4	Total
Bulldogs	3	3	14	0	20
No. 14 Grizzles	10	11	7	7	35

=== at Utah Tech ===
	1	2	3	4	Total
No. 13 Grizzles	14	22	7	0	43
Trailblazers	0	0	0	13	13

=== Ferris State ===
	1	2	3	4	Total
Bulldogs	0	10	0	0	10
No. 12 Grizzlies	3	0	14	0	17

=== at Northern Arizona ===
	1	2	3	4	Total
No. 13 Grizzles	0	14	0	0	14
Lumberjacks	7	14	7	0	28

=== Idaho State ===
	1	2	3	4	Total
Bengals	7	0	7	6	20
No. 18 Grizzles	7	0	14	7	28

=== at No. 20 UC Davis ===
	1	2	3	4	Total
No. 17 Grizzles	7	14	7	3	31
No. 20 Aggies	7	13	0	3	23

=== at No. 3 Idaho ===
	1	2	3	4	Total
No. 16 Grizzles	10	10	0	3	23
No. 3 Vandals	0	7	0	14	21

=== Northern Colorado ===
	1	2	3	4	Total
Bears	0	0	0	0	0
No. 7 Grizzles	0	14	12	14	40

=== No. 7 Sacramento State ===
	1	2	3	4	Total
No. 7 Hornets	7	0	0	0	7
No. 4 Grizzles	7	14	0	13	34

=== at Portland State ===
	1	2	3	4	Total
No. 3 Grizzles	7	17	10	0	34
Vikings	3	0	7	0	10

=== Montana State ===
	1	2	3	4	Total
No. 4 Bobcats	0	0	7	0	7
No. 3 Grizzles	14	6	10	7	37

== FCS Playoffs ==
=== No. 12 Delaware – Second Round ===
	1	2	3	4	Total
No. 12 Blue Hens	0	12	7	0	19
No. 2 Grizzles	10	25	14	0	49

=== No. 7 Furman – Quarterfinals ===
	1	2	3	4	OT	Total
No. 7 Paladins	14	0	7	7	0	28
No. 2 Grizzles	14	6	8	0	7	35

=== No. 8 North Dakota State – Semifinals ===
	1	2	3	4	OT	2OT	Total
No. 8 Bison	3	3	3	7	7	6	29
No. 2 Grizzles	0	10	0	6	7	8	31

=== vs. No. 1 South Dakota State – Championship Game ===
	1	2	3	4	Total
No. 2 Grizzles	0	3	0	0	3
No. 1 Jackrabbits	7	0	16	0	23

== Ranking movements ==
Ranking movements Legend: ██ Increase in ranking ██ Decrease in ranking т = Tied with team above or below
	Week													
Poll	Pre	1	2	3	4	5	6	7	8	9	10	11	12	Final
STATS FCS	14	13	12	13	18	17	16	9	7	4	3	3	2	
Coaches	14	13	11т	11	16	13	10	6	5	3	3	3	2	
