= 2023 Northern Arizona Lumberjacks football team =

American college football season

2023 Northern Arizona Lumberjacks football
- Conference: Big Sky Conference
- Record: 5–6 (5–3 Big Sky)
- Head coach: Chris Ball (5th season)
- Offensive coordinator: Aaron Pflugrad (6th season)
- Defensive coordinator: Kevin Clune (1st season)
- Home stadium: Walkup Skydome

2023 Big Sky Conference football standings
| | Conf. | | | Overall |
| Team | W | | L | W | | L |
|---|---|---|---|---|---|---|
| No. 2 Montana $^ | 7 | – | 1 | 13 | – | 2 |
| No. 8 Idaho ^ | 6 | – | 2 | 9 | – | 4 |
| No. 9 Montana State ^ | 6 | – | 2 | 8 | – | 4 |
| Northern Arizona | 5 | – | 3 | 5 | – | 6 |
| No. 24 UC Davis | 5 | – | 3 | 7 | – | 4 |
| No. 13 Sacramento State ^ | 4 | – | 4 | 8 | – | 5 |
| Portland State | 4 | – | 4 | 5 | – | 6 |
| Weber State | 4 | – | 4 | 6 | – | 5 |
| Eastern Washington | 3 | – | 5 | 4 | – | 7 |
| Idaho State | 3 | – | 5 | 3 | – | 8 |
| Cal Poly | 1 | – | 7 | 3 | – | 8 |
| Northern Colorado | 0 | – | 8 | 0 | – | 11 |
$ – Conference champion; ^ – FCS playoff participant; Rankings from STATS Poll

The 2023 Northern Arizona Lumberjacks football team represented Northern Arizona University as a member of the Big Sky Conference during the 2023 NCAA Division I FCS football season. The Lumberjacks were led by fifth-year head coach Chris Ball and played home games at the Walkup Skydome in Flagstaff, Arizona.

== Preseason ==
=== Polls ===
On July 23, 2023, during the virtual Big Sky Kickoff, the Lumberjacks were predicted to finish ninth in the Big Sky by the coaches and eight by the media.

== Schedule ==
| Date | Time | Opponent | Site | TV | Result | Attendance |
|---|---|---|---|---|---|---|
| September 2 | 7:00 p.m. | at Arizona* | Arizona Stadium; Tucson, AZ | P12N | L 3–38 | 48,159 |
| September 9 | 1:00 p.m. | at No. 17 North Dakota* | Alerus Center; Grand Forks, ND | ESPN+ | L 22–37 | 10,009 |
| September 16 | 1:00 p.m. | Utah Tech* | Walkup Skydome; Flagstaff, AZ | ESPN+ | L 36–50 | 7,102 |
| September 23 | 1:00 p.m. | No. 13 Montana | Walkup Skydome; Flagstaff, AZ | ESPN+ | W 28–14 | 6,428 |
| September 30 | 6:00 p.m. | at No. 8 Sacramento State | Hornet Stadium; Sacramento, CA | ESPN+ | L 30–31 | 12,549 |
| October 7 | 6:00 p.m. | at No. 13 Weber State | Stewart Stadium; Ogden, UT | ESPN+ | W 27–10 | 7,694 |
| October 14 | 1:00 p.m. | Portland State | Walkup Skydome; Flagstaff, AZ | ESPN+ | L 21–45 | 9,713 |
| October 28 | 1:00 p.m. | No. 25 UC Davis^{†} | Walkup Skydome; Flagstaff, AZ | ESPN+ | W 38–21 | 6,931 |
| November 4 | 12:00 p.m. | at No. 6 Montana State | Bobcat Stadium; Bozeman, MT | ESPN+ | L 21–45 | 21,297 |
| November 11 | 1:00 p.m. | Northern Colorado | Walkup, Skydome; Flagstaff, AZ | ESPN+ | W 28–7 | 6,003 |
| November 18 | 2:00 p.m. | at Eastern Washington | Roos Field; Cheney, WA | ESPN+ | W 49–42 | 4,078 |
*Non-conference game; ^{†}Homecoming; Rankings from STATS Poll released prior to the game; All times are in Mountain time

== Game summaries ==
=== at Arizona ===
Northern Arizona Lumberjacks (0–0) vs Arizona Wildcats (0–0) – Game summary

| Quarter | 1 | 2 | 3 | 4 | Total |
|---|---|---|---|---|---|
| Lumberjacks | 0 | 3 | 0 | 0 | 3 |
| Wildcats | 7 | 7 | 21 | 3 | 38 |

at Arizona Stadium • Tucson, AZ

- Date: September 2, 2023
- Game time: 7:00 p.m.
- Game weather: Sunny, 88 °F (31 °C)
- Game attendance: 48,159
- Referee: Cravonne Barrett
- TV announcers (Pac-12 Network): J. B. Long (play-by-play), Max Browne (analyst)

Game information

First quarter

- (11:13) ARIZ – Jacob Cowing 4-yard pass from Jayden de Laura, Tyler Loop kick (Drive: 7 plays, 65 yards, 3:47; Arizona 7–0)

Second quarter

- (13:24) ARIZ – Jonah Coleman 7-yard pass from Jayden de Laura, Tyler Loop kick (Drive: 7 plays, 78 yards, 3:04; Arizona 14–0)
- (0:00) NAU – Marcus Lye 49-yard field goal (Drive: 16 plays, 49 yards, 7:43; Arizona 14–3)

Third quarter

- (11:26) ARIZ – Tacario Davis 85-yard blocked field goal return, Tyler Loop kick (Drive: 9 plays, 66 yards, 3:34; Arizona 21–3)
- (4:34) ARIZ – Tetairoa McMillan 5-yard pass from Jayden de Laura, Tyler Loop kick (Drive: 4 plays, 37 yards, 2:04; Arizona 28–3)
- (2:02) ARIZ – Jayden de Laura 53-yard run, Tyler Loop kick (Drive: 3 plays, 63 yards, 1:07; Arizona 35–3)

Fourth quarter

- (10:46) ARIZ – Tyler Loop 35-yard field goal (Drive: 7 plays, 64 yards, 2:32; Arizona 38–3)

| Statistics | NAU | ARIZ |
|---|---|---|
| First downs | 17 | 22 |
| Total yards | 264 | 478 |
| Rushing yards | 41–78 | 27–186 |
| Passing yards | 186 | 292 |
| Passing: Comp–Att–Int | 18–29–0 | 20–26–1 |
| Time of possession | 35:04 | 24:56 |

| Team | Category | Player | Statistics |
|---|---|---|---|
| Northern Arizona | Passing | Kai Millner | 14/22, 166 yards |
| Northern Arizona | Rushing | T. J. McDaniel | 14 carries, 56 yards |
| Northern Arizona | Receiving | Coleman Owen | 5 receptions, 90 yards |
| Arizona | Passing | Jayden de Laura | 18/24, 285 yards, 3 TD, INT |
| Arizona | Rushing | Michael Wiley | 10 carries, 54 yards |
| Arizona | Receiving | Michael Wiley | 6 receptions, 57 yards |

=== at No. 8 Sacramento State ===
Northern Arizona Lumberjacks (1–3) at No. 8 Sacramento State Hornets (3–1) – Game summary

| Quarter | 1 | 2 | 3 | 4 | Total |
|---|---|---|---|---|---|
| Lumberjacks | 7 | 14 | 7 | 2 | 30 |
| No. 8 Hornets | 14 | 10 | 0 | 7 | 31 |

at Hornet Stadium, Sacramento, CA

- Date: September 30, 2023
- Game time: 6:00 p.m. PST
- Game weather: 67 °F (19 °C) • 0 mph • Cloudy
- Game attendance: 12,549
- Referee: Gregg Wilson
- TV announcers (KMAX-TV/ESPN+): Play-by-Play: Jason Ross, Jr. • Analysis: Darren Arbet

Game information

First Quarter

- (11:54) NAU – Chase Belcher 3-yard run (Marcus Lye kick) (Drive: 4 plays, 81 yards, 1:37; Northern Arizona 7–0)
- (8:36) SAC – Carlos Hill 16-yard pass from Kaiden Bennett (Zach Schreiner kick) (Drive: 9 plays, 75 yards, 3:18; Tied 7–7)
- (1:32) SAC – Elijah Tau-Tolliver 3-yard run (Zach Schreiner kick) (Drive: 12 plays, 58 yards, 4:58; Sacramento State 14–7)

Second Quarter

- (14:29) NAU – Devon Starling 8-yard run (Marcus Lye kick failed) (Drive: 6 plays, 81 yards, 1:58; Sacramento State 14–13)
- (8:08) NAU – Coleman Owen 19-yard pass from Adam Damante (Adam Damante pass to Devon Starling for two-point conversion) (Drive: 8 plays, 98 yards, 4:05; Northern Arizona 21–14)
- (5:25) SAC – Zeke Burnett 7-yard run (Zach Schreiner kick) (Drive: 7 plays, 72 yards, 2:38; Tied 21–21)
- (1:22) SAC – Zach Schreiner 31-yard field goal (Drive: 9 plays, 32 yards, 3:09; Sacramento State 24–21)

Third Quarter

- (7:55) NAU – Devon Starling 8-yard run (Szymon Gawlick kick) (Drive: 16 plays, 99 yards, 6:54; Northern Arizona 28–24)

Fourth Quarter

- (8:31) SAC – Coleman Kuntz 2-yard run (Zach Schreiner kick) (Drive: 18 plays, 81 yards, 6:54; Sacramento State 31–28)
- (0:02) NAU – Team Safety (Drive: 4 plays, -13 yards, 1:34; Sacramento State 31–30)

Line

- SAC –20.0

Over/Under

- 59.5

| Statistics | NAU | SAC |
|---|---|---|
| First downs | 21 | 25 |
| Total yards | 450 | 418 |
| Rushing yards | 195 | 161 |
| Passing yards | 255 | 257 |
| Passing: Comp–Att–Int | 24–34–1 | 18–27–0 |
| Time of possession | 30:13 | 29:47 |

| Team | Category | Player | Statistics |
|---|---|---|---|
| Northern Arizona | Passing | Adam Damante | 23/33, 196 yards, TD, INT |
| Northern Arizona | Rushing | Devon Starling | 21 carries, 117 yards, 2 TD |
| Northern Arizona | Receiving | Elijah Taylor | 2 receptions, 73 yards |
| Sacramento State | Passing | Kaiden Bennett | 18/27, 257 yards, TD |
| Sacramento State | Rushing | Kaiden Bennett | 22 carries, 76 yards |
| Sacramento State | Receiving | Jared Gipson | 5 receptions, 108 yards |
