= 2023 Montana State Bobcats football team =

American college football season

2023 Montana State Bobcats football
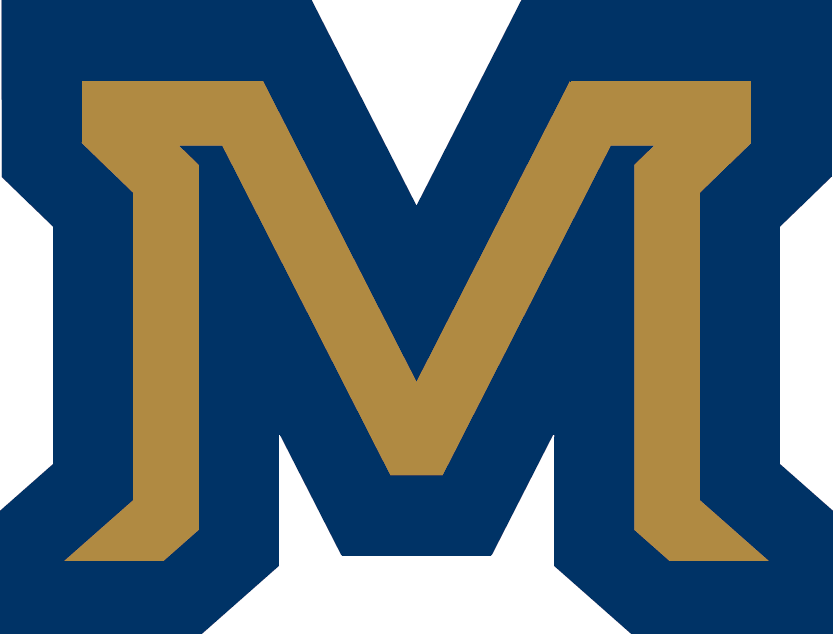

NCAA Division I Second Round, L 34–35^{OT} vs. North Dakota State
- Conference: Big Sky Conference

Ranking
- STATS: No. 9
- FCS Coaches: No. 8
- Record: 8–4 (6–2 Big Sky)
- Head coach: Brent Vigen (3rd season)
- Offensive coordinator: Taylor Housewright (3rd season)
- Offensive scheme: Pro-style
- Defensive coordinator: Willie Mack Garza (2nd season)
- Base defense: 4–2–5
- Home stadium: Bobcat Stadium

2023 Big Sky Conference football standings
	Conf.			Overall
Team	W		L	W		L
No. 2 Montana $^	7	–	1	13	–	2
No. 8 Idaho ^	6	–	2	9	–	4
No. 9 Montana State ^	6	–	2	8	–	4
Northern Arizona	5	–	3	5	–	6
No. 24 UC Davis	5	–	3	7	–	4
No. 13 Sacramento State ^	4	–	4	8	–	5
Portland State	4	–	4	5	–	6
Weber State	4	–	4	6	–	5
Eastern Washington	3	–	5	4	–	7
Idaho State	3	–	5	3	–	8
Cal Poly	1	–	7	3	–	8
Northern Colorado	0	–	8	0	–	11
$ – Conference champion; ^ – FCS playoff participant; Rankings from STATS Poll

The 2023 Montana State Bobcats football team represented Montana State University as a member of the Big Sky Conference during the 2023 NCAA Division I FCS football season. The Bobcats were led by third-year head coach Brent Vigen and played home games at Bobcat Stadium in Bozeman, Montana. The Montana State Bobcats football team drew an average home attendance of 21,610 in 2023.

== Preseason ==
=== Polls ===
On July 23, 2023, during the virtual Big Sky Kickoff, the Bobcats were predicted to finish first in the Big Sky by both the coaches and media.

== Roster ==
2023 Montana State Bobcats football team roster
Players
Coaches
Offense

Pos.	#	Name	Class
WR	0	Javonte King	Fr
WR	1	Marqui Johnson	Jr
WR	2	Clevan Thomas Jr.	GS
RB	3	Jared White	Fr
QB	4	Tommy Mellott	Jr
RB	5	Garrett Coon	So
WR	6	Ty McCullouch	Jr
WR	7	Lonyatta Alexander Jr.	So
TE, FB	8	Derryk Snell	Sr
QB	9	Luke Abshire	Fr
QB	10	Sean Chambers	Sr
RB	11	Elijah Elliott	Jr
QB	12	Jordan Reed	Fr
QB	13	Chance Wilson	Fr
WR	14	Taco Dowler	So
QB	15	Patrick Duchien	Fr
WR	16	Zachary Dodson-Greene	Fr
WR	17	Christian Anaya	Fr
WR	18	Garrett Walchli	Jr
WR	19	Tom Carter	Fr
RB	22	Scottre Humphrey	Fr
RB	23	Adam Jones	Fr
RB	24	Lane Sumner	Sr
WR	25	Jacob Trimble	Fr
RB	28	Colson Coon	Fr
RB	32	Julius Davis	Jr
TE	36	Luke Smith	Fr
FB	48	Max Murphy	Fr
OL	54	Zac Nyland	Fr
G	55	J. T. Reed	Jr
G, C	56	Cole Sain	Sr
OL	57	Everett Carr	Fr
G	58	Aaron Richards	So
OL	60	Tommy Nilson	Fr
OL	62	Bear Old	Fr
OT, G	63	Rush Reimer	Jr
OL	64	Burke Mastel	Fr
C	65	Justus Perkins	Jr
OT	66	Titan Fleischmann	Fr
G	68	Omar Aigbedion	So
G	70	Holden Sampson	Jr
OT	72	Connor Moore	Fr
OL	73	Cedric Jefferson	Fr
OL	74	Jaden Perkins	Fr
OL	75	Jacob Kettels	So
OT	76	Marcus Wehr	Jr
OL	79	Jonathan Luhmann	Fr
TE	80	Treyton Pickering	Sr
WR	81	Tayvian Williams	Sr
TE	82	Elijah Reynolds	So
WR	85	Aidan Garrigan	So
TE	86	Hunter Provience	Fr
TE	87	Ryan Lonergan	Jr
TE	88	Rylan Schlepp	Fr

Defense

Pos.	#	Name	Class
S	0	Blake Stillwell	So
DB	1	Andrew Powdrell	Fr
S	2	Dru Polidore	So
CB	4	Jon Johnson	Jr
S, NB	5	Caden Dowler	So
CB	6	Miles Jackson	Jr
DB	7	Tayden Gray	Fr
S, NB	8	Level Price Jr.	Sr
CB	9	Simeon Woodard	Jr
DE	10	Brody Grebe	Jr
DE	11	Kenneth Eiden IV	So
CB	12	Devin Davis	So
CB	13	Jackson Harmon	So
LB	15	Bryce Grebe	Fr
S	16	Michael Armstrong	Fr
DB	17	Taki Uluilakepa	Fr
S	18	Kendric Bailey	Jr
LB	19	Neil Daily	So
S	20	Tyson Pottenger	So
DB	22	Takhari Carr	Fr
S	23	Aidan Parks	So
DB	24	Colter Petre	Fr
S, NB	26	Rylan Ortt	Jr
DB	27	Brock Steel	Fr
DB	29	JJ Dolan	Fr
LB	30	Danny Uluilakepa	Jr
LB	31	Jace Fitzgerald	So
DT	33	Blake Hehl	Sr
LB	34	Cole Taylor	Fr
DB	35	Kade Cutler	Fr
LB	40	Cole Bullock	Jr
LB	41	Nolan Askelson	Sr
LB	42	Ryan Krahe	Fr
LB	43	McCade O'Reilly	Jr
DE	44	Jake Vigen	Fr
DE	45	Hunter Parsons	So
DE	46	Logan Fredericksen	Fr
LB	47	Eli Aby	So
LB	49	Zac Waible	Fr
DL	50	Zack Black	So
DL	51	Nicholas Korom	Jr
DE	59	Dominic Solano	Fr
DT	69	Jaren Perkins	Fr
DL	89	Ryder Trujillo	Fr
DT	90	Hunter Sharbono	Fr
DE	91	Zac Crews	Fr
DT	92	Blake Schmidt	Jr
DE	94	David Alston	Sr
DT	95	Sebastian Valdez	Jr
DL	96	Paul Brott	So
DE	98	Ben Seymour	Sr
DL	99	Talon Marsh	Fr

Special teams

Pos.	#	Name	Class
K, P	38	Casey Kautzman	Fr
LS	71	Tommy Sullivan	Jr
P, K	93	Brendan Hall	Jr

Head coach

- Brent Vigen

Coordinators/assistant coaches

- Taylor Housewright (Offensive coordinator / quarterbacks)
- Willie Mack Garza (Defensive coordinator / Defensive backs)
- Bobby Daly (linebackers)
- Justin Udy (wide receivers / pass game coordinator / special teams coordinator)
- Shawn Howe (defensive line / defensive run game coordinator)
- Al Johnson (offensive line)
- Tyler Walker (tight ends)
- Nicolas Jean-Baptiste (defensive tackles)
- Bryan Shepherd (cornerbacks)
- Sam Mix (running backs)

Legend

- (C) Team captain
- (S) Suspended
- (I) Ineligible
- Injured
- Redshirt

Roster
Last update: December 7, 2024

== Schedule ==
Date	Time	Opponent	Rank	Site	TV	Result	Attendance
September 2	6:00 p.m.	Utah Tech*	No. 3	Bobcat Stadium; Bozeman, MT	ESPN+	W 63–20	21,967
September 9	5:00 p.m.	at No. 1 South Dakota State*	No. 3	Dana J. Dykhouse Stadium; Brookings, SD	ESPN+	L 16–20	19,332
September 16	1:00 p.m.	Stetson*	No. 3	Bobcat Stadium; Bozeman, MT	ESPN+	W 57–20	21,487
September 23	6:00 p.m.	at No. 10 Weber State	No. 3	Stewart Stadium; Ogden, UT	ESPN+	W 40–0	10,905
September 30	2:00 p.m.	Portland State^{†}	No. 3	Bobcat Stadium; Bozeman, MT	ESPN+	W 38–22	22,017
October 14	6:00 p.m.	Cal Poly	No. 2	Bobcat Stadium; Bozeman, MT	ESPN+	W 59–19	21,997
October 21	8:30 p.m.	at No. 3 Sacramento State	No. 2	Hornet Stadium; Sacramento, CA	ESPN2	W 42–30	16,122
October 28	2:00 p.m.	at No. 9 Idaho	No. 2	Kibbie Dome; Moscow, ID	ESPN+	L 21–24	13,073
November 4	1:00 p.m.	Northern Arizona	No. 6	Bobcat Stadium; Bozeman, MT	ESPN+	W 45–21	21,297
November 11	1:00 p.m.	Eastern Washington	No. 5	Bobcat Stadium; Bozeman, MT	ESPN+	W 57–14	20,897
November 18	12:00 p.m.	at No. 3 Montana	No. 4	Washington-Grizzly Stadium; Missoula, MT (rivalry)	ESPN+	L 7–37	27,178
December 2	1:00 p.m.	No. 8 North Dakota State*	No. 5	Bobcat Stadium; Bozeman, MT (NCAA Division I Second Round)	ESPN+	L 34–35 ^{OT}	17,247
*Non-conference game; ^{†}Homecoming; Rankings from STATS Poll released prior to the game; All times are in Mountain time

== Game summaries ==
=== at No. 1 South Dakota State ===
No. 3 Montana State Bobcats (1–0) vs No. 1 South Dakota State (1–0) – Game summary

Quarter	1	2	3	4	Total
No. 3 Bobcats	7	3	0	6	16
No. 1 Jackrabbits	0	0	7	13	20

at Dana J. Dykhouse Stadium • Brookings, SD

- Date: September 9, 2023
- Game time: 5:00 p.m. MDT
- Game weather: 70 °F (21 °C), Sunny, Wind NE 10 mph (16 km/h)
- Game attendance: 19,332
- Referee: Rick Warne
- TV announcers (ESPN+/MTN-CW/MidCo): Tom Nieman, Kurtiss Riggs, Darron Wallace

Statistics	MSU	SDSU
First downs	17	20
Total yards	298	341
Rushing yards	211	157
Passing yards	87	184
Turnovers	1	0
Time of possession	35:23	24:37

Team	Category	Player	Statistics
Montana State	Passing	Sean Chambers	3/9, 53 yards, INT
Montana State	Rushing	Sean Chambers	20 carries, 90 yards, TD
Montana State	Receiving	Derryk Snell	3 receptions, 38 yards
South Dakota State	Passing	Mark Gronowski	13/22, 184 yards, 2 TD
South Dakota State	Rushing	Isaiah Davis	12 carries, 66 yards
South Dakota State	Receiving	Griffin Wilde	2 receptions, 49 yards, TD

=== at No. 3 Sacramento State ===
No. 2 Montana State Bobcats (5–1) at No. 3 Sacramento State Hornets (5–1) – Game summary

Quarter	1	2	3	4	Total
No. 2 Bobcats	0	14	7	21	42
No. 3 Hornets	7	0	10	13	30

at Hornet Stadium, Sacramento, CA

- Date: October 21, 2023
- Game time: 7:30 p.m. PST
- Game weather: SW 9 mph • Sunny
- Game attendance: 16,122
- Referee: Jim Crowley
- TV announcers (ESPN2): Play-by-Play: John Schriffen • Analysis: Rocky Boiman • Sideline: Dawn Davenport

Game information

First Quarter

- (0:58) SAC – Danny Scudero 16-yard run (Zach Schreiner kick) (Drive: 11 plays, 80 yards, 4:20; Sacramento State 7–0)

Second Quarter

- (12:47) MTST – Jon Johnson 16-yard interception return (Brendan Hall kick) (Drive: 2 plays, 1 yard, 0:32; Tied 7–7)
- (3:46) MTST – Ty McCullouch 21-yard pass from Sean Chambers (Brendan Hall kick) (Drive: 8 plays, 75 yards, 4:44; Montana State 14–7)

Third Quarter

- (10:10) MTST – Tommy Mellott 11-yard run (Brendan Hall kick) (Drive: 3 plays, 26 yards, 1:16; Montana State 21–7)
- (8:48) SAC – Elijah Tau-Tolliver 53-yard run (Zach Schreiner kick) (Drive: 4 plays, 75 yards, 1:22; Montana State 21–14)
- (6:09) SAC – Zach Schreiner 26-yard field goal (Drive: 5 plays, 17 yards, 2:30; Montana State 21–17)

Fourth Quarter

- (14:53) MTST – Tommy Mellott 9-yard run (Brendan Hall kick) (Drive: 11 plays, 90 yards, 6:11; Montana State 28–17)
- (10:02) SAC – Elijah Tau-Tolliver 10-yard run (Zach Schreiner kick) (Drive: 12 plays, 75 yards, 4:51; Montana State 28–24)
- (8:26) MTST – Julius Davis 1-yard run (Brendan Hall kick) (Drive: 4 plays, 63 yards, 1:31; Montana State 35–24)
- (5:05) MTST – Jared White 12-yard run (Brendan Hall kick) (Drive: 4 plays, 28 yards, 2:31; Montana State 42–24)
- (1:27) SAC – Devin Gandy 7-yard pass from Kaiden Bennett (two-point pass conversion failed) (Drive: 11 plays, 75 yards, 3:38; Montana State 42–30)

Line

- MTST –10.5

Over/Under

- 59.5

Statistics	MTST	SAC
First downs	26	25
Total yards	448	434
Rushing yards	328	200
Passing yards	120	234
Passing: Comp–Att–Int	10–16–1	26–42–2
Time of possession	32:40	27:20

Team	Category	Player	Statistics
Montana State	Passing	Tommy Mellott	9/14, 99 yards
Montana State	Rushing	Julius Davis	12 carries, 110 yards, TD
Montana State	Receiving	Ty McCullough	4 receptions, 53 yards, TD
Sacramento State	Passing	Kaiden Bennett	26/42, 234 yards, TD, 2 INT
Sacramento State	Rushing	Elijah Tau-Tolliver	8 carries, 100 yards, 2 TD
Sacramento State	Receiving	Devin Gandy	5 receptions, 59 yards, TD

=== at No. 9 Idaho ===
No. 2 Montana State Bobcats (6–1) vs No. 9 Idaho Vandals (5–2) – Game summary

Quarter	1	2	3	4	Total
No. 2 Bobcats	0	0	14	7	21
No. 9 Vandals	3	7	0	14	24

at Kibbie Dome • Moscow, ID

- Date: October 28, 2023
- Game time: 1:00 p.m. PDT
- Game attendance: 13,073
- TV announcers (ESPN+/MTN-CW/SWX NW): Ben Creighton, Ty Gregorak, Scott Breen

=== at Montana ===
	1	2	3	4	Total
No. 4 Bobcats	0	0	7	0	7
No. 3 Grizzles	14	6	10	7	37

== NCAA Division I playoffs ==
=== No. 8 North Dakota State (second round) ===
No. 8 North Dakota State Bison (9–3) vs. No. 5 (6) Montana State Bobcats (8–3)

Quarter	1	2	3	4	OT	Total
No. 8 Bison	0	14	7	7	7	35
No. 5 (6) Bobcats	7	7	14	0	6	34

at Bobcat Stadium, Bozeman, MT

- Date: December 2, 2023
- Game time: 2:00 p.m. (CT)
- Game weather: Sunny; 36 °F (2 °C); Wind: W 15 mph
- Game attendance: 17,247
- Referee: Bruce Austin
- TV announcers (ESPN+): Noah Reed, Charles Arbuckle

Statistics	North Dakota State	Montana State
First downs	18	21
Plays–yards	57–374	59–509
Rushes–yards	43–296	40–279
Passing yards	78	230
Passing: comp–att–int	6–14–0	14–19–1
Turnovers		
Time of possession	29:43	30:17

Team	Category	Player	Statistics
North Dakota State	Passing	Cam Miller	5/13, 66 yds, TD
North Dakota State	Rushing	TaMerik Williams	11 car, 162 yds, 2 TD
North Dakota State	Receiving	Eli Green	4 rec, 63 yds
Montana State	Passing	Tommy Mellott	13/17, 204 yds, 2 TD, INT
Montana State	Rushing	Tommy Mellott	18 car, 151 yds, 2 TD
Montana State	Receiving	Ty McCullouch	4 rec, 92 yds TD

Scoring summary

Quarter	Time	Drive			Team	Scoring information	Score	
Quarter	Time	Plays	Yards	TOP	Team	Scoring information	NDSU	MTST
1st	1:57	3	63	1:11	MTST	Ty McCullouch (#6) 34-yard touchdown reception from Tommy Mellott (#4), Casey Kautzman (#38) kick good	0	7
2nd	8:52	5	39	2:56	NDSU	Zach Mathis (#0) 3-yard touchdown reception from Cam Miller (#7), Griffin Crosa (#39) kick good	7	7
2nd	4:07	5	93	2:58	NDSU	TaMerik Williams (#22) 44-yard touchdown run, Griffin Crosa (#39) kick good	14	7
2nd	1:05	6	71	3:02	MTST	Tommy Mellott (#4) 6-yard touchdown run, Casey Kautzman (#38) kick good	14	14
3rd	14:50	1	75	0:10	NDSU	TaMerik Williams (#22) 75-yard touchdown run, Griffin Crosa (#39) kick good	21	14
3rd	13:56	2	86	0:48	MTST	Tommy Mellott (#4) 76-yard touchdown run, Casey Kautzman (#38) kick good	21	21
3rd	8:08	8	69	4:11	MTST	Clevan Thomas Jr. (#2) 9-yard touchdown reception from Tommy Mellott (#4), Casey Kautzman (#38) kick good	21	21
4th	2:33	9	89	4:48	NDSU	TK Marshall (#28) 29-yard touchdown run, Griffin Crosa (#39) kick good	28	28
OT		5	25		NDSU	Cam Miller (#7) 3-yard touchdown run, Griffin Crosa (#39) kick good	35	28
OT		1	25		MTST	Scottre Humphrey (#22) 25-yard touchdown run, Casey Kautzman (#38) kick blocked	35	34
"TOP" = time of possession. For other American football terms, see Glossary of American football.							35	34

== Ranking movements ==
Ranking movements Legend: ██ Increase in ranking ██ Decrease in ranking
	Week													
Poll	Pre	1	2	3	4	5	6	7	8	9	10	11	12	Final
STATS FCS	3	3	3	3	3	2	2	2	2	6	5	4	5	
Coaches	3	3	3	3	3	2	2	2	2	8	5	4	8	
