= 2023 Weber State Wildcats football team =

American college football season

2023 Weber State Wildcats football
- Conference: Big Sky Conference
- Record: 6–5 (4–4 Big Sky)
- Head coach: Mickey Mental (1st season)
- Offensive scheme: Power spread
- Co-defensive coordinators: Grant Duff (3rd season); Joe Dale (3rd season)
- Base defense: Multiple 4–3
- Home stadium: Stewart Stadium

2023 Big Sky Conference football standings
	Conf.			Overall
Team	W		L	W		L
No. 2 Montana $^	7	–	1	13	–	2
No. 8 Idaho ^	6	–	2	9	–	4
No. 9 Montana State ^	6	–	2	8	–	4
Northern Arizona	5	–	3	5	–	6
No. 24 UC Davis	5	–	3	7	–	4
No. 13 Sacramento State ^	4	–	4	8	–	5
Portland State	4	–	4	5	–	6
Weber State	4	–	4	6	–	5
Eastern Washington	3	–	5	4	–	7
Idaho State	3	–	5	3	–	8
Cal Poly	1	–	7	3	–	8
Northern Colorado	0	–	8	0	–	11
$ – Conference champion; ^ – FCS playoff participant; Rankings from STATS Poll

The 2023 Weber State Wildcats football team represented Weber State University as a member of the Big Sky Conference during the 2023 NCAA Division I FCS football season. The Wildcats were led by first-year head coach Mickey Mental and played at Stewart Stadium in Ogden, Utah. Mental took over for longtime coach Jay Hill who left for the defensive coordinator job with BYU.

== Preseason ==
=== Polls ===
On July 23, 2023, during the virtual Big Sky Kickoff, the Wildcats were predicted to finish fourth in the Big Sky by the coaches and sixth by the media.

== Schedule ==
Date	Time	Opponent	Rank	Site	TV	Result	Attendance
August 31	6:00 p.m.	Central Washington*	No. 13	Stewart Stadium; Ogden, UT	ESPN+	W 35–10	6,316
September 9	3:00 p.m.	at No. 21 Northern Iowa*	No. 12	UNI-Dome; Cedar Falls, IA	ESPN+	W 34–17	7,967
September 16	12:00 p.m.	at No. 12 (FBS) Utah*	No. 9	Rice–Eccles Stadium; Salt Lake City, UT	P12N	L 7–31	51,532
September 23	6:00 p.m.	No. 3 Montana State	No. 10	Stewart Stadium; Ogden, UT	ESPN+	L 0–40	10,905
September 30	1:00 p.m.	at Northern Colorado	No. 13	Nottingham Field; Greeley, CO	ESPN+	W 28–21	3,375
October 7	6:00 p.m.	Northern Arizona	No. 13	Stewart Stadium; Ogden, UT	ESPN+	L 10–27	7,694
October 14	6:00 p.m.	UC Davis^{†}	No. 22	Stewart Stadium; Ogden, UT	ESPN+	L 16–17	7,121
October 21	5:00 p.m.	at Eastern Washington		Roos Field; Cheney, WA	ESPN+	L 23–31	7,514
November 4	4:00 p.m.	at Idaho State		Holt Arena; Pocatello, ID	ESPN+	W 33–21	8,233
November 11	1:00 p.m.	No. 4 Idaho		Stewart Stadium; Ogden, UT	ESPN+	W 31–29	8,741
November 18	6:00 p.m.	at Cal Poly		Alex G. Spanos Stadium; San Luis Obispo, CA	ESPN+	W 48–21	4,829
*Non-conference game; ^{†}Homecoming; Rankings from STATS Poll released prior to the game; All times are in Mountain time

== Rankings ==
Ranking movements Legend: ██ Increase in ranking ██ Decrease in ranking — = Not ranked RV = Received votes
	Week													
Poll	Pre	1	2	3	4	5	6	7	8	9	10	11	12	Final
STATS	13	12	9	10	13	13	22	RV						
Coaches	10	9	7	8	14	14	23	—						
