= Junior Bergen =

American football player (born 2002)

Profile
- Positions: Wide receiver, return specialist

Personal information
- Born: October 23, 2002 (age 24); Billings, Montana, U.S.
- Listed height: 5 ft 9 in (1.75 m)
- Listed weight: 184 lb (83 kg)

Career information
- High school: Billings Senior (MT)
- College: Montana (2021–2024)
- NFL draft: 2025: 7th round, 252nd overall pick

Career history
- San Francisco 49ers (2025–2026)*; New York Jets (2026)*
- * Offseason or practice squad member only

Awards and highlights
- First-team FCS All-American (2024); First-team All-Big Sky (2024)
- Stats at Pro Football Reference

Junior Bergen (born October 23, 2002) is an American professional football wide receiver and return specialist. He played college football for the Montana Grizzlies and was selected by the San Francisco 49ers in the seventh round of the 2025 NFL draft.

== Early life ==
Bergen is the sixth of eight children in his family. His father, Simon Bergen, is a former Billings Outlaw player of the Indoor Football League.

He attended Billings Senior high school, where he played basketball and football. He played as a receiver in his sophomore and junior year, and primarily as a quarterback in his senior year. At that role, he was a dual threat, throwing 1,186 yards and 13 touchdowns, and rushing for 905 yards and 17 touchdowns. He was listed as a two-star recruit by 247Sports, and had college offers from several schools. Bergen initially committed to Montana State before deciding to accept a full scholarship at the University of Montana. He reportedly had not determined at the time which position he was going to play.

== College career ==
He began studying and playing at the University of Montana in 2021. He played his freshman year as a running back, where he had nearly 500 yards, before switching to receiver halfway through the season. He also was named the team's punt returner near the end of the season. Despite never previously fielding a punt, he averaged 17.5 yards per punt, the second highest in the Big Sky Conference.

In his sophomore year, due to injuries, Bergen did have a slight decrease in yard production, though he did increase his punt and kick return attempts from 8 to 26.

In Bergen's junior year, he led his team in receptions with 58. In the FCS semifinal, he also set a school record with his 5th punt return for a touchdown in his career, and he threw the game winning two points attempt in the FCS semifinal. This led him being named to the AP second team All-American all-purpose player and first-team All-Big Sky receiver & punt returner. In the FCS championship game, Bergen had four receptions for 25 yards in the 23-3 loss against South Dakota State.

By the end of Bergen's senior year, he held the school record for most average yards per punt return with 16.71, and he set the FCS record for most punt returns for a touchdown with 8. He finished his college career with 4,468 all-purpose yards, the 6th most in University of Montana history. He was an honorable mention all-purpose player for the FCS All-America team.

=== College statistics ===
Season	Games	Receiving					Rushing					Kick returns					Punt returns				
Season	GP	Rec	Yds	Avg	Lng	TD	Att	Yds	Avg	Lng	TD	Ret	Yds	Avg	Lng	TD	Ret	Yds	Avg	Lng	TD
2021	12	21	230	11.0	74	1	118	493	4.2	28	4	1	0	0.0	0	0	8	140	17.5	37	0
2022	11	17	214	12.6	47	4	14	42	3.0	12	0	4	90	22.5	33	0	22	327	14.9	72	2
2023	15	59	791	13.4	76	5	6	40	6.7	21	0	15	434	28.9	99	1	28	429	15.3	59	3
2024	13	48	542	11.3	55	3	1	2	2.0	2	0	21	454	21.6	41	0	10	240	24.0	84	3
Career	51	145	1777	12.3	76	13	139	577	4.2	28	4	41	978	23.9	99	1	68	1136	16.7	84	8

== Professional career ==
Pre-draft measurables
Height	Weight	Arm length	Hand span	Wingspan	40-yard dash	10-yard split	20-yard split	20-yard shuttle	Three-cone drill	Vertical jump	Broad jump	Bench press
5 ft 9 1/2 in (1.77 m)	184 lb (83 kg)	30 in (0.76 m)	9 in (0.23 m)	6 ft 0 1/4 in (1.84 m)	4.52 s	1.59 s	2.70 s	4.22 s	7.00 s	36.5 in (0.93 m)	10 ft 0 in (3.05 m)	17 reps
All values from Pro Day

Bergen was not invited to the NFL Combine. However, he did participate in the University of Montana's pro day on April 3, 2025. Notably, his 40-yard dash time was within the top 10 receivers who participated in the NFL Combine, and his 17 bench presses would have been tied for third for all receivers.

=== San Francisco 49ers ===
Bergen was selected by the San Francisco 49ers with the 252nd overall pick in the seventh round of the 2025 NFL draft. Though he was listed as a wide receiver in the draft, according to the head coach of the 49ers Kyle Shanahan, the team intends to have him play as a return specialist. On May 9, Bergen signed a four-year contract with the 49ers worth $4.3 million. He was waived on August 26 as part of final roster cuts and re-signed to the practice squad the next day.

On January 20, 2026, Bergen signed a reserve/futures contract with San Francisco. On August 12, Bergen was waived by the 49ers.

=== New York Jets ===
On August 19, 2026, Bergen was signed by the New York Jets. He was waived by the Jets as a part of final roster cuts on August 30.
