= Greg Peach =

American gridiron football player (born 1986)

Profile
- Position: Defensive end

Personal information
- Born: November 19, 1986 (age 39); Vancouver, Washington, U.S.
- Listed height: 6 ft 3 in (1.91 m)
- Listed weight: 255 lb (116 kg)

Career information
- High school: Evergreen High School (Vancouver, Washington)
- College: Eastern Washington
- NFL draft: 2009: undrafted

Career history
- 2009–2011: Edmonton Eskimos
- 2012–2013: Hamilton Tiger-Cats
- 2013–2015: Winnipeg Blue Bombers

Awards and highlights
- 2008 Buck Buchanan Award; 2008 Consensus First-Team FCS All-American (AFCA, AP, TSN, WCFF); 2008 Big Sky Conference Defensive Player of the Year; Eastern Washington records: Tackles for a loss in a season (28); Tackles for a loss in a career (63); Sacks in a career (35.5)
- Stats at CFL.ca

Greg Peach (born November 19, 1986) is an American former professional football defensive end who played in the Canadian Football League (CFL) with the Edmonton Eskimos, Hamilton Tiger-Cats, and Winnipeg Blue Bombers. He was originally signed by the Eskimos as a street free agent in 2009. He played college football at Eastern Washington and was the 2008 recipient of the Buck Buchanan Award.

== Early life ==
Greg was born and raised in Vancouver, Washington. He graduated from Evergreen High School where he was named a First Team All-State selection by the Tacoma News Tribune as a defensive lineman. He also played basketball while at Evergreen.

== College career ==
Peach had a career-best senior season in 2008, ending the year with 72 defensive tackles (35 solo), 23.5 tackles for loss, 18 sacks, one pass broken up and one fumble recovery in 11 games (11 starts). His outstanding efforts that season earned him the Buck Buchanan Award, honoring the Division I Football Championship Subdivision's top defensive player. He ended his collegiate career with 35.5 sacks, which established a new record for career sacks in school history. Peach also set school records for most tackles for a loss in a season (28) and career (63).

== Professional career ==
=== Edmonton Eskimos ===
Peach signed with the Edmonton Eskimos of the Canadian Football League as a free agent in 2009. In his 3 seasons with the Eskimos, Peach has recorded a total of 94 tackles and 13 sacks. He was not re-signed by the Eskimos following the 2011 CFL season.

=== Hamilton Tiger-Cats ===
He signed with the Hamilton Tiger-Cats as a free agent on February 18, 2012. In his first season with the Tiger-Cats he amassed 36 tackles and 6 sacks. He was injured for much of the first half of the 2013 CFL season, leading to his release on August 28, 2013.

=== Winnipeg Blue Bombers ===
Peach was signed by the Winnipeg Blue Bombers and played 6 games for them to close out the 2013 season. In his second season with the club Peach had the best year of his career, amassing 46 tackles, 7 quarterback sacks and 2 forced fumbles (all personal bests). The Bombers defense struggled in 2015 to generate pressure on the quarterback, and this was reflected in Peach's statline as he finished the season with only 1 sack in 11 games. On February 18 2016 the Bombers announced they had released Greg Peach from his contract.
