= Jermaine Jackson (wide receiver, born 2000) =

American gridiron football player (born 2000)

- Jackson with the BC Lions in 2026

No. 84 – BC Lions
- Position: Wide receiver / return specialist
- Roster status: Active
- CFL status: American

Personal information
- Born: June 2, 2000 (age 26); Oakland, California, U.S.
- Listed height: 5 ft 7 in (1.70 m)
- Listed weight: 170 lb (77 kg)

Career information
- High school: San Leandro (San Leandro, California)
- College: San Mateo (2018–2019); Idaho (2020–2023)
- NFL draft: 2024: undrafted

Career history
- New Orleans Saints (2024); BC Lions (2025–present)

Awards and highlights
- First-team All-Big Sky (2022); Second-team All-Big Sky (2023)

Career NFL statistics
- Return yards: 255
- Rushing yards: -1
- Rushing average: -1
- Stats at Pro Football Reference

Jermaine Jackson (born June 2, 2000) is an American professional football wide receiver and return specialist for the BC Lions of the Canadian Football League (CFL). He played college football for the San Mateo Bulldogs and Idaho Vandals and was signed by the Saints as an undrafted free agent in 2024.

== Early life ==
Jackson was born on June 2, 2000, and grew up in Oakland, California. He attended San Leandro High School in California, where he played football and totaled 751 rushing yards and 16 touchdowns and 595 receiving yards with six receiving touchdowns as a senior. While in high school, he was a member of the United States national junior American football team.

== College career ==
Jackson began his collegiate career at the College of San Mateo in 2018, recording 14 receptions for 174 yards as a freshman in 2018. In 2019, he helped his team to the conference championship and an overall record of 12–1, totaling 47 receptions for 622 yards, as well as 1,303 all-purpose yards and 11 total touchdowns. He was a first-team all-state selection for his performance.

Jackson transferred to the NCAA Division I FCS Idaho Vandals for the 2020 season, postponed to spring 2021 due to the COVID-19 pandemic, but suffered a torn ACL and MCL in his first game, on his second attempted kickoff return. In the fall 2021 season, he appeared in four games and redshirted, recording eight receptions for 93 yards. During the 2022 season, Jackson totaled 54 receptions for 1,049 yards and four touchdowns, also recording a punt return touchdown and a kickoff return touchdown. He was named a first-team All-Big Sky Conference selection at both wide receiver and punt returner for his performance. As a redshirt senior in 2023, he played all 13 games, finishing with 48 receptions for 593 yards, 18 punt returns for 332 yards and 18 kick returns for 478 yards, scoring two receiving touchdowns and two punt return touchdowns. He was chosen a second-team All-Big Sky performer at wide receiver and punt returner. In his tenure at Idaho, Jackson totaled 107 receptions for 1,687 yards and six touchdowns, as well as 666 kick return yards and 604 punt return yards, scoring four return touchdowns.

== Professional career ==
Pre-draft measurables
Height	Weight	Arm length	Hand span	40-yard dash	10-yard split	20-yard split	20-yard shuttle	Three-cone drill	Vertical jump	Broad jump	Bench press
5 ft 6 1/2 in (1.69 m)	176 lb (80 kg)	28 1/8 in (0.71 m)	8 7/8 in (0.23 m)	4.58 s	1.66 s	2.68 s	4.28 s	7.07 s	35 in (0.89 m)	9 ft 8 in (2.95 m)	17 reps
All values from Pro Day

=== New Orleans Saints ===
After going unselected in the 2024 NFL draft, Jackson signed with the New Orleans Saints as an undrafted free agent, on a contract including $150,000 guaranteed. He was waived/injured by the Saints on August 3, 2024. Jackson was re-signed to the practice squad on October 1. Following an injury to Rashid Shaheed, Jackson was signed off the practice squad to the active roster on October 17, prior to the team's Week 7 game against the Denver Broncos. He was waived on November 16, and re-signed to the practice squad.

=== BC Lions ===
On April 18, 2025, Jackson signed with the BC Lions of the Canadian Football League (CFL). On June 12, Jackson was placed on the Lions' one-game injured list. He re–joined the active roster on June 19. On July 13, Jackson was again placed one the Lions' one-game injured list after suffering an injury during the previous week's game against the Montreal Alouettes, where he spent the remainder of the 2025 CFL season.

On May 31, 2026, Jackson was released by Lions, during their final cuts before the start of the 2026 CFL season. On June 17, Jackson was re-signed by the Lions and was assigned to their practice roster. The following day, Jackson was promoted to the Lions' active roster.
