= KGRG =

KGRG may refer to:

- KGRG (AM), a radio station (1330 AM) licensed to Enumclaw, Washington, United States
- KGRG-FM, a radio station (89.9 FM) licensed to Auburn, Washington, United States
