= Auburn Mountainview High School =

Location
- 28900 124th Avenue SE; Auburn, Washington 98092; United States

Information
- Type: Public Secondary
- Established: 2005
- School district: Auburn School District #408
- Principal: Frank Ramirez
- Teaching staff: 79.72 (FTE)
- Grades: 9–12
- Enrollment: 1,611 (2023–2024)
- Student to teacher ratio: 20.21
- Campus: Suburban
- Colors: Royal blue and orange
- Mascot: Lion
- Newspaper: InView
- Website: auburnmountainview.auburn.wednet.edu

Auburn Mountainview High School is located in Lea Hill on the east hill of Auburn, a city in King County, Washington, United States. It was named after the scenic views from the school, including the Cascade Mountains, Mount Rainier, and the Olympic Mountains.

== History ==
Construction of Auburn Mountainview began in 2004 in the Lea Hill area of Auburn, Washington. The school was built to relieve overcrowding of the district's other two main high schools, Auburn Senior High School and Auburn Riverside High School. Mountainview opened its doors to the community in the fall of 2005. Nearby Rainier Middle School is the primary feeder school with a small number from Cascade Middle School as well as some Kent area students. The school is close to the Auburn-Kent border. Because of perennial troubles with overcrowding in many Kent schools, about 40% of the Auburn Mountainview student population is made up of Kent area students.

== Athletics ==
Auburn Mountainview's sports teams are called the Lions and compete in the Olympic Division of the North Puget Sound League since 2016.

== Notable alumni ==
- Ariana Kukors, American swimmer and former 200m IM world record holder
