= KENU =

KENU may refer to:

- KENU (FM), a radio station (88.5 FM) licensed to serve Des Moines, New Mexico, United States
- KGRG (AM), a radio station (1330 AM) licensed to serve Enumclaw, Washington, United States, which held the call sign KENU from 1981 to 2007
