= Beierlein =

Beierlein is a German language surname. It stems from a diminutive of the surname Beier – and may refer to:

- Traudi Beierlein (born 1941), German former swimmer
- W. J. Beierlein (1891–1983), American politician
