= Public Policy Polling =

U.S. Democratic polling firm

- Company type: Private
- Industry: Opinion polling
- Founded: 2001; 25 years ago Raleigh, North Carolina, U.S.
- Founder: Dean Debnam
- Headquarters: 2912 Highwoods Boulevard, Suite 201; Raleigh, North Carolina, U.S.
- Area served: United States
- Key people: Tom Jensen (Director)
- Website: publicpolicypolling.com

Public Policy Polling (PPP) is an American polling firm affiliated with the Democratic Party. Founded in 2001 by businessman Dean Debnam, the firm is based in Raleigh, North Carolina. Debnam died in 2024. Tom Jensen serves as the firm's director.

In addition to political issues, PPP has conducted polling on comical topics. These include surveys of whether Republican voters believe Barack Obama would be eligible to enter heaven in the event of the Rapture, whether hipsters should be subjected to a special tax for being annoying, and whether Ted Cruz is the Zodiac Killer.

== Elections ==
=== 2008 ===
PPP first entered prominence through its performance in the 2008 Democratic primaries between Barack Obama and Hillary Clinton. The company performed well, producing accurate predictions in states ranging from South Carolina to Wisconsin, many of which featured inaccurate results by other pollsters. After the November election, PPP was ranked by the Wall Street Journal as one of the two most accurate firms, among those who were most active in the presidential swing states.

=== 2010 ===
PPP was the first pollster to find Scott Brown with a lead over Martha Coakley in the Massachusetts Senate special election; Brown ultimately won in a major comeback, and PPP's final poll in that race predicted Brown's winning margin exactly.

=== 2011 ===
PPP was praised in two articles from politico.com for its accuracy in polling the 2011 primaries and special elections, which are notoriously hard to predict. The contests they accurately predicted include the West Virginia gubernatorial primaries, special elections in New York and California, as well as all eight Wisconsin recall elections.

=== 2012 ===
A study by Fordham University found that, of 28 firms studied, PPP had the most accurate poll on the presidential national popular vote, both its independently conducted poll and the one it does in collaboration with the Daily Kos and the SEIU. PPP correctly called the winner of the presidential election in all 19 states it polled in the final week of the election, as well as the winners of all the U.S. Senate and gubernatorial races it surveyed.

=== 2014 ===
Political research firm YouGov found PPP's gubernatorial polls to have the lowest average margin of error among national firms that polled in at least five gubernatorial races in the month preceding the election.

=== 2016 ===
In the 2016 Presidential Election, PPP's final polls widely missed the mark in several key swing states, including New Hampshire, North Carolina, Pennsylvania, and Wisconsin. Their polls also significantly underestimated President Trump's lead in Ohio, and incorrectly predicted Hillary Clinton to win Florida.

== Methodology and reception ==
The company's surveys use Interactive Voice Response (IVR), an automated questionnaire used by other polling firms such as SurveyUSA and Rasmussen Reports. The journalist Nate Cohn has criticized the company's methodology as being "unscientific".

In 2013 columnist Nate Cohn described PPP as a liberal pollster. Statistician Nate Silver stated that PPP had a tendency to slightly lean Democratic by 1% as of January 2022. As of January 2022, Silver's website, FiveThirtyEight, gave PPP a A− grade in its pollster ranking.
