= GRCC =

GRCC can refer to:

- Grand Rapids Community College
- Green River Community College
