= KGRG-FM =

Radio station in Auburn, Washington

- Auburn, Washington; United States
- Broadcast area: SW King County/Tacoma
- Frequencies: 89.9 MHz FM (HD Radio)
- Branding: The All-New KGRG-FM

Programming
- Format: facility silent, currently streaming Modern AC/Top 40

Ownership
- Owner: Green River College
- Sister stations: KGRG

History
- Former call signs: KGRG
- Call sign meaning: Green River Gators

Technical information
- Facility ID: 25168
- Class: A
- ERP: 250 watts
- HAAT: 112 meters (367 ft)
- Transmitter coordinates: 47°15′23″N 122°13′07″W

Links
- Webcast: KGRG-FM webcast
- Website: KGRG Web Page

KGRG-FM (89.9 FM) is a radio station in Auburn, Washington owned by Green River College. The station broadcasts over the air at 89.9 MHz and as well as online. The station also broadcasts in HD.

KGRG-FM broadcasts GRCC and local high school playoff athletic events live.

The station antenna is located within the dense residential neighborhood of Lakeland Hills in Auburn, Washington near the intersection of Panorama Drive and Hazel Ave, near the King/Pierce County border. The digital power of the HD radio signal was increased by 4 times in April 2011.

KGRG-FM was chosen to be one of the first college radio stations to be available on iHeartRadio's College section and became #1 in their first month on the site.

During November 2023, the station switched to a Modern AC-leaning Top 40 presentation, moving much of the alternative music onto the HD-2 signal and KGRG (AM).

During June 2024, KGRG-FM went silent due to "...the loss of the transmitting antenna, and other technical problems". The filing with the FCC requested a six-month authorization to stop over the air broadcasts. The stations can still be streamed online.
