= Crow with Fries =

Sculpture by Peter Reiquam in Auburn, Washington, U.S.

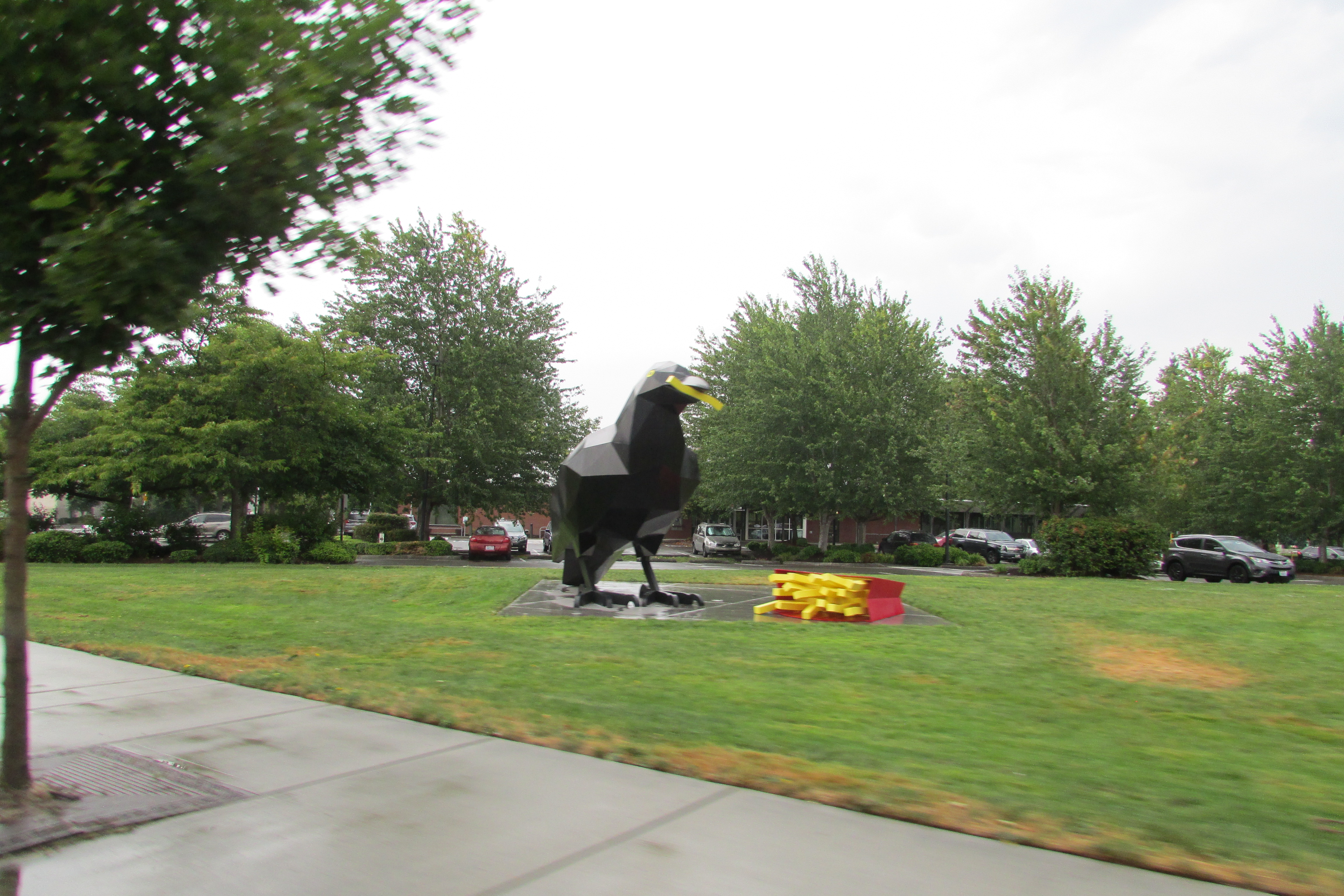
- Crow with Fries at Les Grove Park, Auburn, Washington.
- Artist: Peter Reiquam
- Medium: Aluminum sculpture
- Subject: Crow
- Location: Auburn, Washington
- 47°17′53″N 122°13′6.2″W

Crow with Fries is a sculpture by Peter Reiquam, installed in Auburn, Washington. The aluminum statue is 12 feet tall and 18 feet long. It was installed at Les Gove Park—the site of a former drive-in burger restaurant—in May 2019.
