= Green River College =

Community college in Auburn, Washington, US

Coordinates: 47°18′48″N 122°10′42″W

- Type: Public community college
- Established: 1963
- President: George Frasier (interim)
- Students: 8,477 full-time, 11,237 part-time (Fall 2012)
- Location: Auburn, Washington, United States
- Campus: Suburban
- Nickname: Gators
- Mascot: Slater the Gator
- Website: www.greenriver.edu

Green River College is a public community college in Auburn, Washington, United States. It has a student body of over 13,000 and has satellite campuses in nearby cities of Kent and Enumclaw, Washington. The college primarily awards associates degrees but also offers 9 bachelor's degrees.

== History ==
Green River College started as a program of adult evening education in 1945 as part of the Auburn School District. The school was approved to become a community college in 1963 and began technical and professional programs in September 1964. The school was originally located near the Auburn Boeing plant, but the following year the campus was relocated to its current location on Lea Hill. In 2014 the school changed its name from Green River Community College to Green River College and began offering the Bachelor of Applied Sciences degree. On 22 April 2022, the college hosted President Joe Biden, where he spoke about his administration's vision for lowering costs for American families. The event was held in the Mel Lindbloom Student Union Building, and was attended by various local and national leaders.

== Campus ==
Man Interacts With Ted Jonsson Sculpture On Lea Hill Campus

The main campus is on Lea Hill in Auburn, with satellite campuses in downtown Auburn, Enumclaw and Kent, Washington.

== Academics ==
Green River College offers certificate, associate, and applied baccalaureate degree programs, as well as classes to prepare students for academic transfer to a four-year college or university; more than 40 professional and technical programs; and classes in Adult Basic Education and English for speakers of other languages. One of the college's signature programs is Aviation Technology, where students are trained for a variety of careers including Air Traffic Controller and Professional Pilot. Students learn in Green River's new state-of-the-art air traffic control lab and flight simulator. Top transfer programs include business, engineering and IT. Green River offers a wide variety of other majors in sciences, humanities and social sciences.

Green River is also known for its strong international program. As of fall 2014, GRC hosted over 1,700 international students from 64 countries, ranking it among the top 10 community colleges in the US in international enrollment. As of Fall 2007 self-reported data, 43% of students are male and 57% female. 61% of students are white, 13% multi-racial, 8% Asian/Pacific Islander, 8% Hispanic, 5% African American, 1% Native American, and 4% other. About 35% of students that leave GRC receive an academic associate degree, 7% earn a vocational associate degree, while another 44% gain vocational certificates.

In 2014, Green River College began offering Bachelor of Applied Science degree programs. In the 2017–2018 academic year, 118 (7%) of the 1,586 degrees awarded at Green River were bachelor's degrees.

== Student life ==
=== Athletics ===
Green River competes in the Western Region of the Northwest Athletic Conference (NWAC). The college athletic teams are nicknamed the Gators.

=== Media ===
Green River College operates KGRG-FM and KGRG (AM) (formerly KENU - Pulse 1330). As with most college radio stations, the staff are mostly students. The GRC student newspaper, The Current, has been published since the college opened in 1965.

== Notable people ==
- Tony Barron, professional baseball player
- Jessica Bateman, member of the Washington House of Representatives
- Mark Emmert, president of the National Collegiate Athletic Association
- David Riske, professional baseball player
- Tre Simmons, professional basketball player and coach
- Doug Sisk, professional baseball player
- Tony Tost, poet, critic, and screenwriter
