= Danny Shelton =

American football player (born 1993)

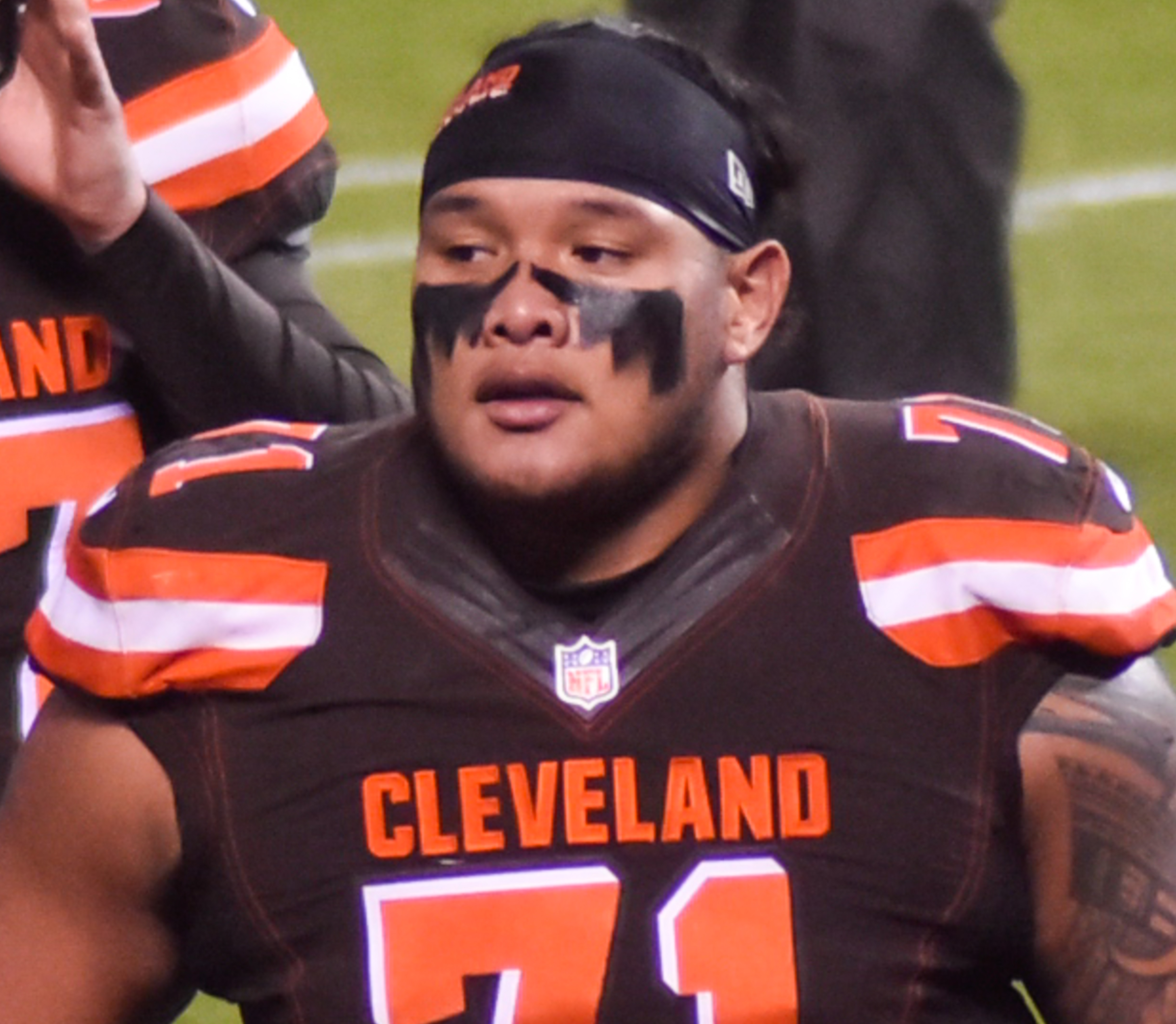
- Shelton with the Cleveland Browns in 2015

No. 71, 55, 75
- Position: Defensive tackle

Personal information
- Born: August 20, 1993 (age 33); Auburn, Washington, U.S.
- Listed height: 6 ft 2 in (1.88 m)
- Listed weight: 345 lb (156 kg)

Career information
- High school: Auburn
- College: Washington (2011–2014)
- NFL draft: 2015: 1st round, 12th overall pick

Career history
- Cleveland Browns (2015–2017); New England Patriots (2018–2019); Detroit Lions (2020); New York Giants (2021); Kansas City Chiefs (2022–2023)

Awards and highlights
- 2× Super Bowl champion (LIII, LVII); First-team All-American (2014); First-team All-Pac-12 (2014)

Career NFL statistics
- Total tackles: 278
- Sacks: 6.0
- Forced fumbles: 1
- Pass deflections: 2
- Stats at Pro Football Reference

Daniel Saileupumoni Shelton (born August 20, 1993) is an American former professional football player who was a defensive tackle in the National Football League (NFL). He was selected by the Cleveland Browns in the first round of the 2015 NFL draft. He played college football for the Washington Huskies.

== Early life ==
Shelton attended Auburn Senior High School in Auburn, Washington, where he played football and competed in track and wrestling. He was a four-star recruit and the 10th best defensive tackle by Rivals.com. Shelton committed to play college football at the University of Washington in January 2011.

He also participated in track & field as a thrower. He earned second-place finishes in both the shot put (54–3 or 16.58 m) and discus throw (155–7 or 47.50 m) at the 2010 West Central District 4A Championships. As a senior, he won the state 4A shot put championship with a career-best throw of 18.31 meters (60–1).

== College career ==
As a true freshman in 2011, he played in 13 games with one start and had 11 tackles. As a sophomore and junior in 2012 and 2013 he started every game at nose tackle for the Huskies. He recorded 45 tackles and 0.5 sacks in 2012 and 59 tackles and two sacks in 2013. Shelton entered 2014 as a starter for the third straight year. He recorded four sacks against Eastern Washington, which was more than he had combined the previous three seasons and the most for a Huskies player since 1989, earning him first-team Associated Press All-American. He finished the season with nine sacks. Shelton was also a member of the Huskies' track and field team.

== Professional career ==
Pre-draft measurables
Height	Weight	Arm length	Hand span	40-yard dash	10-yard split	20-yard split	20-yard shuttle	Three-cone drill	Vertical jump	Broad jump	Bench press
6 ft 2 1/8 in (1.88 m)	339 lb (154 kg)	32 in (0.81 m)	10 1/4 in (0.26 m)	5.64 s	1.90 s	3.21 s	4.65 s	7.99 s	30 1/2 in (0.77 m)	7 ft 11 in (2.41 m)	34 reps
All values from NFL Combine

=== Cleveland Browns ===
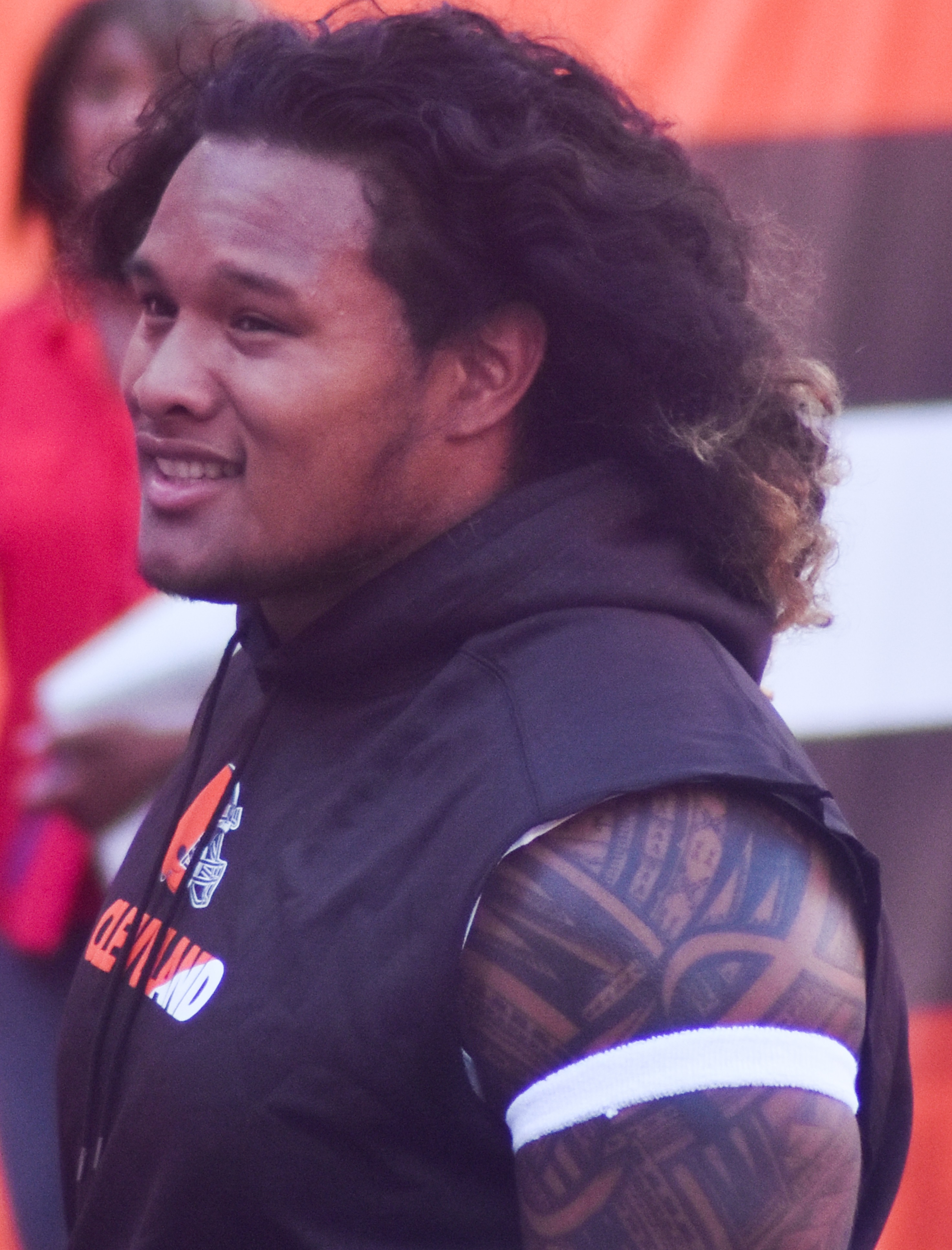
Shelton with the Browns in 2015

On April 30, 2015, Shelton was selected by the Cleveland Browns with the 12th overall selection of the first round in the 2015 NFL draft. When meeting with Roger Goodell on stage, he hugged the commissioner and lifted him off the ground in excitement. Shelton was the University of Washington's first defensive lineman selected in the first round of an NFL draft since Steve Emtman in 1992. On May 12, 2015, Shelton signed a four-year deal worth $11.7 million. In 16 games of his rookie season, Shelton played 16 games with 36 tackles.

After center Alex Mack left the team in free agency during the 2016 offseason, Shelton changed his jersey number from 71 to 55, which was previously worn by Mack. Shelton had wanted the number since being drafted by the Browns but opted for his college 71 since 55 was unavailable. He explained he wanted to adorn 55 as tributes to his brother Shennon and former NFL linebacker Junior Seau, both of whom have died and have worn 55 while playing football. In 2016, he started all 16 games with 59 tackles and 1.5 sacks.

On February 23, 2017, Shelton underwent a minor wrist surgery. In 2017, Shelton started 14 games for the Browns recording 33 tackles.

=== New England Patriots ===
On March 10, 2018, the Browns agreed to trade Shelton and a 2018 fifth-round draft pick to the New England Patriots for a 2019 third-round pick. The deal became official on March 14, 2018, at the start of the NFL year. On May 2, 2018, the Patriots declined the fifth-year option on Shelton's contract, making him a free agent in 2019. Shelton helped the Patriots reach Super Bowl LIII, where they defeated the Los Angeles Rams 13–3.

On May 20, 2019, Shelton re-signed with the Patriots. In week 2 against the Miami Dolphins, Shelton recorded his first sack of the season in the 43–0 win. In week 11 against the Philadelphia Eagles, Shelton recorded a strip sack on Carson Wentz which was recovered by teammate Lawrence Guy in the 17–10 win.

=== Detroit Lions ===
On March 24, 2020, Shelton signed a two-year, $8 million contract with the Detroit Lions. He was placed on injured reserve on December 2, 2020. On January 2, 2021, Shelton was activated off of injured reserve. He was released after the season on March 16, 2021.

=== New York Giants ===
On March 29, 2021, Shelton signed a one-year deal with the New York Giants. He played in 13 games, recording 31 total tackles and .5 sacks.

=== Kansas City Chiefs ===
Shelton signed with the Kansas City Chiefs on August 15, 2022. He was released on August 30, 2022, and signed to the practice squad the next day. Shelton won his second Super Bowl ring when the Chiefs defeated the Philadelphia Eagles in Super Bowl LVII. He signed a reserve/future contract on February 15, 2023.

On August 29, 2023, Shelton was released by the Chiefs and re-signed to the practice squad. He was released on September 19.

== NFL career statistics ==
Legend
	Won the Super Bowl
**Bold**	Career high

Year	Team	Games		Tackles				Fumbles			Interceptions					
Year	Team	GP	GS	Comb	Solo	Ast	Sack	FF	FR	Yds	Int	Yds	Avg	Lng	TD	PD
2015	CLE	**16**	15	36	19	17	0.0	0	0	0	0	0	0	0	0	0
2016	CLE	**16**	**16**	59	**32**	27	1.5	0	0	0	0	0	0	0	0	0
2017	CLE	14	14	33	20	13	0.0	0	0	0	0	0	0	0	0	**1**
2018	NE	13	1	21	10	11	0.0	0	0	0	0	0	0	0	0	0
2019	NE	**16**	14	**61**	30	**31**	**3.0**	**1**	0	0	0	0	0	0	0	0
2020	DET	12	12	37	15	22	1.0	0	0	0	0	0	0	0	0	**1**
2021	NYG	13	0	31	12	19	0.5	0	0	0	0	0	0	0	0	0
2022	KC	1	0	0	0	0	0.0	0	0	0	0	0	0	0	0	0
Total		101	72	278	138	140	6.0	1	0	0	0	0	0	0	0	2

== Personal life ==
Shelton's mother is Samoan, and his father is Peruvian. He often speaks with pride about his Samoan heritage and dons a lavalava, a traditional Polynesian cloth worn like a kilt or skirt.

On May 1, 2011, Shelton and his brothers were involved in an altercation at an apartment complex in Auburn, Washington. One brother died of a gunshot wound, while another was wounded in the incident.
