= Auburn School District =

School district in King County, Washington

Auburn School District No. 408
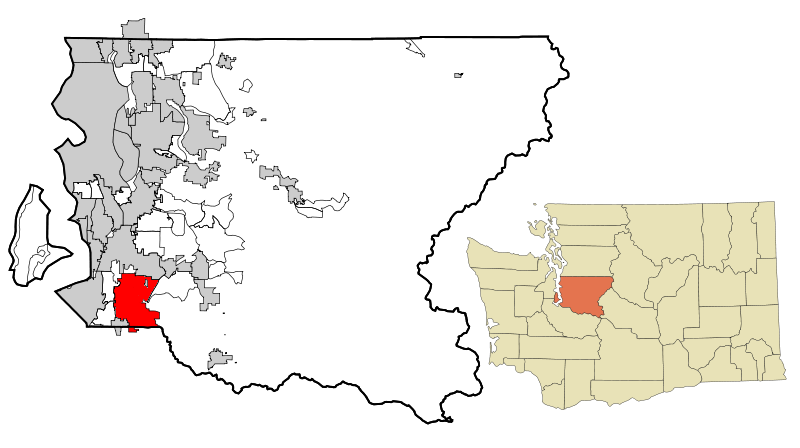
- Map of King County, Washington with incorporated and unincorporated areas of Auburn highlighted

Address
- 915 4th Street NE, Auburn, Washington, 98002; United States

District information
- Type: Public
- Grades: Pre-K through 12
- Established: 1896; 130 years ago
- Superintendent: Dr. Alan Spiciatti
- School board: Sheilia McLaughlin (District 1), Arlista Holman (District 2), Valerie Gonzales (District 3), Laura Theimer (District 4), Shelly Combs (District 5)
- NCES District ID: 5300300

Students and staff
- Students: 17,007 (2020-2021)
- Teachers: 762
- Staff: 254
- Student–teacher ratio: 16.91

Other information
- Website: Auburn.wednet.edu

Auburn School District No. 408 is a public school district in King County, Washington, seated in Auburn. The district encompasses a 62 square-mile area bridging King County, Washington and Pierce County, Washington, and serves approximately 75,000 residents in Auburn, Algona, Pacific, and a small portion of Kent, as well as unincorporated census-designated places such as Lake Morton-Berrydale and Lake Holm.

In the 2018-2019 school year, the district had an enrollment of 17,505 students. Consisting of 14 elementary schools, 4 middle schools, 3 comprehensive high schools, and 1 alternative high school.

Growth in the last decade prompted the district to build a total of 9 new schools (5 elementary schools, 2 middle schools, and 2 comprehensive high schools). While Auburn Mountainview High School is the newest comprehensive high school built since 1992, Auburn High School (formerly Auburn Senior High School) will be the newest building added to the Auburn School District in 2014. The district employs 849 certified teachers, and staff, and 801 classified staff., In addition, several former students from the district have become well-known names, including Washington State governor, Christine Gregoire, Commander Dick Scobee, and several other notable names.

== School Board ==
The Auburn School District Board of Directors consists of five members who are elected by the voters of the entire school district. Board members serve four-year staggered terms and must be registered voters, at the time of their election or appointment, in the geographical region, known as the Director District, they represent on the board. The board sets school policies within the guidelines of the law and the State Board of Education. Board meetings are held on the second and fourth Monday of the month at 7 p.m. at the James P. Fugate Administration Building board room, located at 915 4th St NE, Auburn, WA 98002. Special sessions are announced to the public in advance.

School Board Members
Director	Director District	First Elected	Term End	Board Position
Sheilia McLaughlin	1	2019	2023	Director
Arlista Holman	2	2019	2023	Director
Valerie Gonzales	3	2022	2023	
Laura Theimer	4	2018	2023	
Tracy Arnold	5	2020	2025	Director

== Schools ==
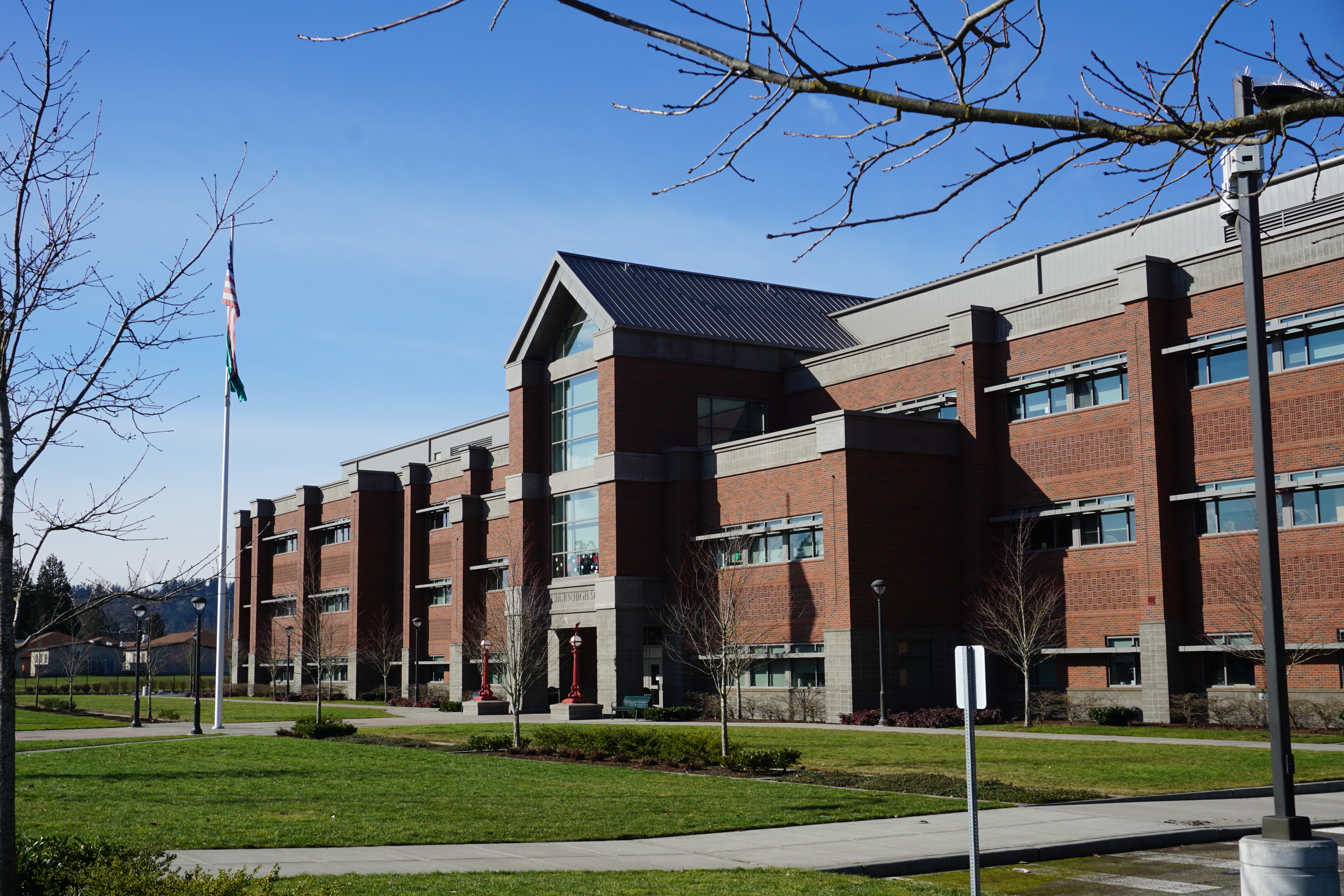
Auburn Senior High, opened 1950.

=== High schools ===
School	Location	Mascot	Colors	Approx. Students
Auburn High School	Auburn	Trojans	Green/Gold	1,874
Auburn Riverside High School ()	Auburn	Ravens	Navy Blue/Teal/Silver	1,742
Auburn Mountainview High School ()	Auburn	Lions	Blue/Orange	1,429
West Auburn High School ()	Auburn	Wolves	Grey	275

=== Middle schools 6-8 ===
- Cascade MS
  - Cascade Middle School is located in North Auburn and has a student population 750. School colors are purple and gold. Mascot is the Spartans.
- Mt. Baker MS
  - Mt. Baker Middle School is located in the Southwest Region of Auburn. School colors are burgundy, grey and black. The mascot is the Bulldogs.
- Olympic MS
  - Olympic Middle School is located in South Auburn and has about 700 students. The school colors are blue and white. The mascot is the Cougars.
- Rainier MS
  - Rainier Middle School is situated on Lea Hill and has 900 students. School colors are black and red. Mascot is the Panthers.

=== Elementary schools K-5 ===
- Alpac ES
  - Located in Pacific, Washington - Opened in 1973 and named for the cities of Algona and Pacific. Originally an open classroom concept school, later converted to standard classroom ideals in 1983. The school colors are red and black. Mascot is the Allstars.
- Arthur Jacobsen ES
  - Opened in 2007, on the former Jacobsen Tree farm and the lower portion of Auburn Mountainview's campus. School colors are black and gold. The mascot is the Thunderbirds.
- Bowman Creek ES
  - Opened in 2020, Bowman Creek is the 15th Elementary in the Auburn School District. School colors are blue and gold. Mascot is the Bears.
- Chinook ES
  - Opened in 1963 and named for the nearby White River Fish Hatchery. Located on the Muckleshoot Indian Reservation. Chinook has since gotten a new school building that opened on October 19, 2022. The school colors are blue and orange. The mascot is the Eagles.
- Dick Scobee ES
  - Dick Scobee Elementary opened in 1959 as North Auburn Elementary and was renamed for the famed astronaut and Auburn High School graduate who died as commander of the Space Shuttle Challenger, Dick Scobee. Dick Scobee was rebuilt in 2020-2021. The school colors are red, white, and blue. The mascot is the Challengers.
- Evergreen Heights ES
  - Opened in 1970, located on the West Hill of Auburn. School colors are green, yellow and white. The mascot is the Timberwolves.
- Gildo Rey ES
  - Opened in 1969, under the name of South Auburn Elementary, and was renamed in 1976 in honor of a longtime faculty member, Gildo Rey. The school colors are green and blue. The mascot is the Hawks.
- Hazelwood ES
  - Opened in 1990, on Auburn's Lea Hill. The school colors are blue and black. The mascot is the Orcas.
- Ilalko ES
  - Opened 1992. Named after a Native American village, the word "Ilalko" means "Striped Water." Located Next to Auburn Riverside. School colors are teal and black. Mascot is the Huskies.
- Lakeland Hills ES
  - Opened in the Lakeland Hills community in 2006. School colors are red and grey. The mascot is the Wildcats.
- Lake View ES
  - Opened in 1980. The school colors are red and black. The mascot is the Cardinals.
- Lea Hill ES
  - Opened in 1965 as one of only 11 schools in the United States designated as a National Educational landmark by the National Park Service. Lea Hill has since gotten a new school building that opened on October 27, 2022. The school colors are purple and black. The mascot is the Mustangs.
- Pioneer ES
  - Opened in 1950. Home of the Auburn Elites demo team. Pioneer re-opened with a new building in August 2021. School colors are red, white, and blue. Mascot is the Patriots.
- Terminal Park ES
  - Opened in 1945 and it was named for the terminal end of the railroad and the neighborhood where the rail workers lived, Terminal Park. Terminal Park has since gotten a new school building that opened on September 26, 2023. The school colors are blue and yellow. The mascot is the Tigers.
- Washington ES
  - The oldest Elementary school in Auburn, located next to Auburn High School, originally opened in 1920, was demolished and rebuilt in 1970. School colors are red, white, and blue. The mascot is the Explorers.
- Willow Crest ES
  - Willow Crest Elementary opened in the 2022-23 school year. School colors are blue, light blue, and white. The school mascot is the Owls.
