= W. J. Beierlein =

American politician

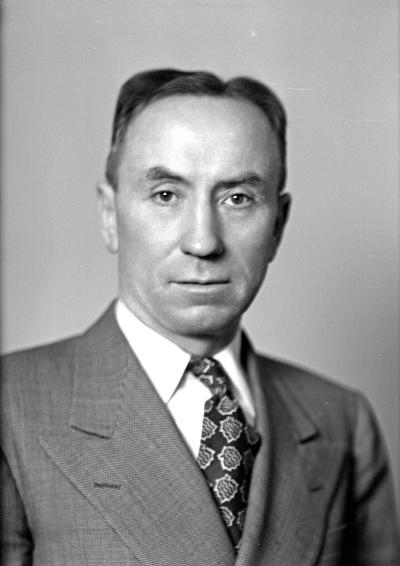
- Beierlein in 1947

Member of the Washington House of Representatives for the 30th district
- In office 1939–1965

Personal details
- Born: June 3, 1891 Blue Grass, North Dakota, United States
- Died: December 1983 (aged 92) Auburn, Washington, United States
- Party: Democratic

Wenzel J. "Joe" Beierlein (June 3, 1891 – December 1983) was an American politician in the state of Washington. He served in the Washington House of Representatives from 1939 to 1965. He was President of the Auburn Federal Savings and Loan Association. Beierlein was instrumental in the passage of legislation establishing the state´s community college system.
