= Lea Hill, Auburn, Washington =

Lea Hill, Washington
- Neighborhood
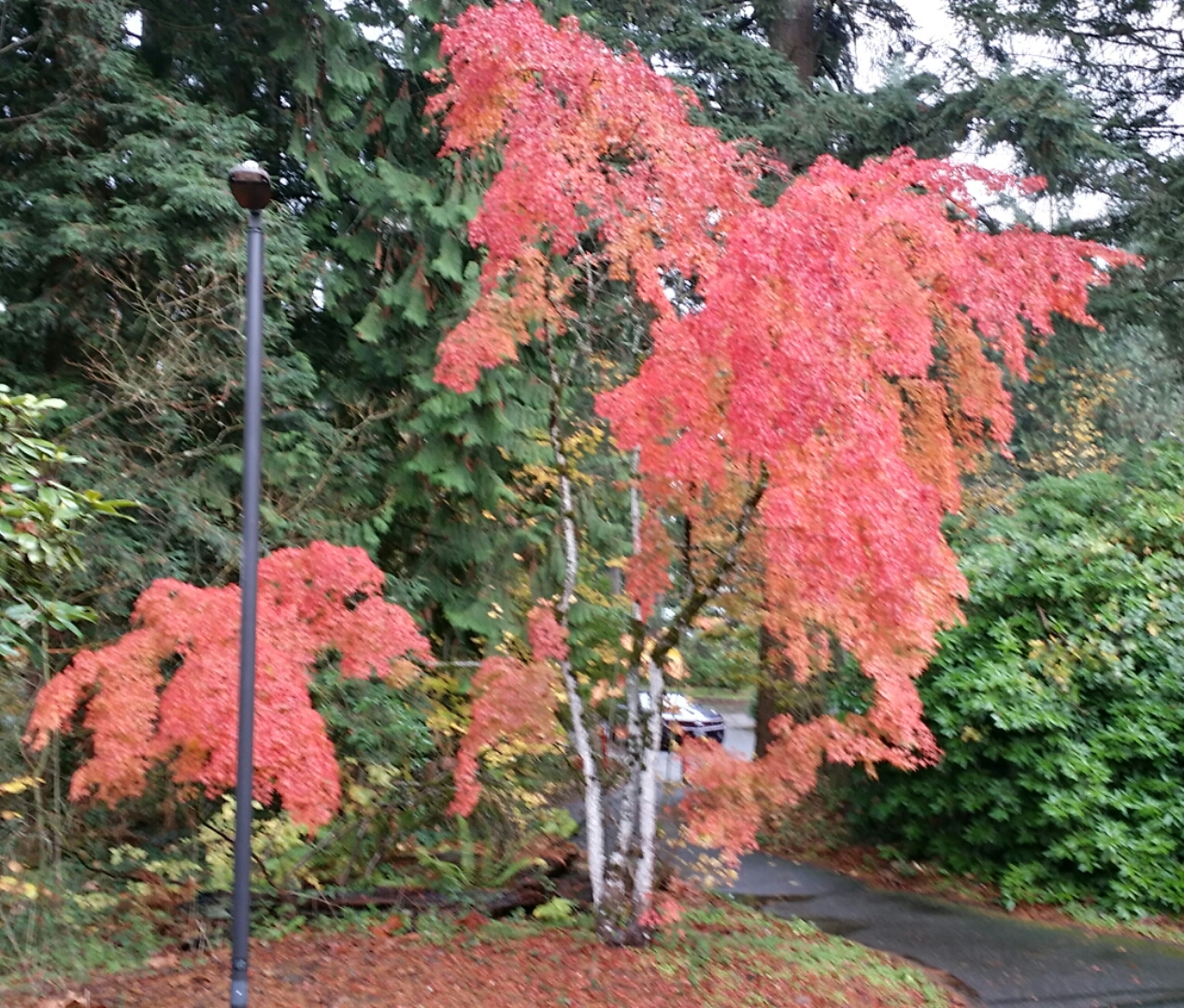
- A tree in Lea Hill
- Nickname: Hazelwood
- Location of Lea Hill, Washington
- Coordinates: 47°19′34″N 122°11′16″W
- Country: United States
- State: Washington
- County: King
- Annexed: January 1, 2008

Area
  - Total: 5.9 sq mi (15.2 km^{2})
  - Land: 5.9 sq mi (15.2 km^{2})
  - Water: 0.0312500 sq mi (0.0809371 km^{2})
- Elevation: 417 ft (127 m)

Population (2000)
  - Total: 10,871
  - Density: 1,855/sq mi (716.2/km^{2})
- Time zone: UTC-8 (Pacific (PST))
  - Summer (DST): UTC-7 (PDT)
- Postal code: 98092
- Area code: 253
- FIPS code: 53-38815
- GNIS feature ID: 1867618

Lea Hill is a neighborhood located in the city of Auburn, Washington, United States. The community was annexed by Auburn on January 1, 2008, after Auburn and Lea Hill residents approved the annexation.

The population was 10,871 at the 2000 census, at which time it was a census-designated place (CDP).

Based on per capita income, one of the more reliable measures of affluence, Lea Hill ranks 67th of 522 areas in the state of Washington to be ranked.

Lea Hill is home to Green River College.

== Geography ==
Lea Hill is located at 47°19′34″N 122°11′16″W (47.325998, -122.187815).

According to the United States Census Bureau, the CDP had a total area of 5.9 square miles (15.2 km^{2}), all of it land.

== Demographics ==
Historical population
Census	Pop.	Note	%±
1990	6,876		—
2000	10,871		58.1%
2007 (est.)	11,618

As of the census of 2000, there were 10,871 people, 3,644 households, and 2,878 families residing in the CDP. The population density was 1,855.0 people per square mile (716.3/km^{2}). There were 3,754 housing units at an average density of 640.6/sq mi (247.3/km^{2}). The racial makeup of the CDP was 86.16% White, 2.23% African American, 0.95% Native American, 4.47% Asian, 0.17% Pacific Islander, 1.93% from other races, and 4.09% from two or more races. Hispanic or Latino of any race were 4.93% of the population.

There were 3,644 households, out of which 45.7% had children under the age of 18 living with them, 65.0% were married couples living together, 9.7% had a female householder with no husband present, and 21.0% were non-families. 13.4% of all households were made up of individuals, and 2.1% had someone living alone who was 65 years of age or older. The average household size was 2.98 and the average family size was 3.29.

In the CDP, the population was spread out, with 31.5% under the age of 18, 8.7% from 18 to 24, 33.6% from 25 to 44, 20.9% from 45 to 64, and 5.3% who were 65 years of age or older. The median age was 33 years. For every 100 females, there were 100.0 males. For every 100 females age 18 and over, there were 97.9 males.

The median income for a household in the CDP was $65,706, and the median income for a family was $70,691. Males had a median income of $47,848 versus $33,504 for females. The per capita income for the CDP was $26,767. About 3.0% of families and 5.9% of the population were below the poverty line, including 7.6% of those under age 18 and none of those age 65 or over.
