= Nate Cohn =

American journalist (born 1988)

- Born: Nathan David Cohn; August 16, 1988 (age 38)
- Education: Whitman College (BA)
- Occupation: Journalist
- Employer: The New York Times

Nathan David Cohn (born August 16, 1988) is an American journalist and chief political analyst for "The Upshot" at The New York Times. His reporting focuses on elections, public opinion, and demographics in the United States.

== Early life and education ==
Cohn was raised in Auburn, Washington, and graduated from Auburn High School in 2006. While still in high school, he became interested in analyzing the 2004 United States presidential election. He then studied at Whitman College, where he earned a Bachelor of Arts degree in politics in 2010.

== Career ==
After graduating from college, he began working at The Stimson Center in Washington, D.C. He was then recruited by The New Republic before being hired by David Leonhardt to work for The New York Times in November 2013. At the Times, he has worked with Amanda Cox on many of "The Upshot"'s election-related stories.

Cohn has been a political commentator on CNN, MSNBC, C-SPAN, and NPR. In addition to writing for The New York Times, Cohn has also written columns for the Chicago Tribune, The Baltimore Sun, and RealClearPolitics, among others.
