= KGRG (AM) =

Radio station in Enumclaw, Washington

Coordinates: 47°12′53″N 121°58′19″W

- Enumclaw, Washington; United States
- Broadcast area: Enumclaw/Auburn, Washington
- Frequency: 1330 kHz
- Branding: KGRG1

Programming
- Format: Off the air and currently streaming Classic alternative

Ownership
- Owner: Green River Foundation
- Operator: Green River College
- Sister stations: KGRG-FM

History
- First air date: April 28, 1982
- Former call signs: KENU (1982–1996)
- Call sign meaning: Green River Gators

Technical information
- Licensing authority: FCC
- Facility ID: 14061
- Class: D
- Power: 500 watts (day); 26 watts (night)

Links
- Public license information: Public file; LMS
- Webcast: Listen Live

KGRG (1330 AM) is a 500 watts day and 26 watts at night AM college radio station transmitting from Enumclaw, Washington, licensed to the Green River Foundation and operated by Green River College in Auburn, Washington. The station is called "KGRG1" and has a classic alternative format.

KGRG's nighttime signal reception is affected mainly by KKPZ Portland, as well as CJYM Rosetown, Saskatchewan in certain areas. This makes KGRG difficult to receive outside of the Enumclaw area; however, KGRG1 has been reported in California and Oregon.

== History ==
=== KENU - The Sound of The Plateau ===
Licensed April 28, 1982, KENU was a country music station at 1330 AM run by a series of local owners in Enumclaw, Washington including Robert Reverman. KENU was a community focused radio station that ran local programming hosted by local DJs as well as coverage of Enumclaw High School's football games.

In 1988, KENU changed call signs to KQZQ. KQZQ aired a Hard Rock radio format which only lasted for a total of 23 days, when KENU returned by popular demand.

=== Country Gold Network ===
In 1992, KENU became a simulcast of KJUN 1450 AM in Puyallup, Washington and became a part of the new Country Gold Network along with KBLV 1540 AM in Bellevue, Washington, and KTOL 1280 AM in Olympia, Washington.

In early 1996, the Country Gold Network discontinued operations due to financial distress. KENU went silent and was put up for sale.

=== Plateau Country ===
In November 1996, The Green River Foundation purchased the silent radio station, so that Green River Community College students would have internship possibilities at KENU. The studio was moved into the Enumclaw GRCC campus and KENU went back on the air as "Plateau Country". They tried to operate KENU as a commercial radio station, but relatively few students ever participated in the country station internship.

During the summer of 2000, the KENU studios were relocated to Green River's Auburn Campus. In 2001, the general manager of GRCC's radio stations, Tom Evans Krause, allowed a format change. KENU went into stunting, airing the top dance hits of 1997, preparing for a new radio format.

=== KENU - NU Music, Pure Dance ===
KENU was moved into the Student Center, next door to KGRG at the Auburn campus with a new digital on air studio. The new moniker as KENU "NU Music, Pure Dance" was adopted, playing a Dance Hits radio format similar to KNHC.

With relatively few complaints from country music fans in the Enumclaw area, the new dance radio format was well received by the public. It was one of the few radio stations in the US to play electronic dance music (EDM), and was the only AM station in the US to do so since Beat Radio.

In January 2002, KENU began streaming online.

In May 2004, Karl Koning became the new program director, Matt DeLaney the assistant program director, and Jess Flarity became the new music director. Shortly after, the station began stunting with only a pulsating heart beat, generating the idea that the station was undergoing a radio format change. But in actuality, the station was undergoing preparations for a new image campaign to in an attempt to boost awareness of KENU at the school and in the community as well as slightly refocusing the music format.

=== Pulse 1330 ===
The new EDM format (unveiled in June 2004) was branded as "Pulse 1330", which tried to stay away from mainstream Dance music. The new format included a new logo, new IDs, new slogan "The Northwest's Underground Music Source", and the playlist was completely revamped. Pulse 1330 gained a presence in the Seattle party scene, despite the fact that their signal was barely audible in the downtown Seattle area. Even though "Pulse" broadcast over 1330 AM, their main focus was their worldwide online presence as an internet radio station.

At first, "Pulse" focused mainly on Trance, but as time went on, it began including other forms of Electronica, such as Hardcore, House, Drum'n'Bass/Jungle, as well as Rhythmic tracks from local artists (while KGRG played Rock tracks from local artists).

"Pulse" frequently had local DJs spinning on air, many of them well known in the local party scene, and they also hosted several LAN parties, as well as other promotional events that featured Pulse DJs and Pulse music, but they were rarely seen at events on the GRCC campuses. The former show Non-Linear Parfait broke the station's record for the most calls in one show and paved the way for much of the strange programming that was heard on The Pulse. Non-Linear Parfait was hosted by Seattle-based DJ/producer Graz. Other notable DJs at the station at that time were Magic Man and DJ Nathan V.

In summer 2006, only one student enrolled for the class, which rose to three students in the fall. The station management worked very hard to keep the format afloat, but the lack of student involvement would have resulted in the class being dissolved for the year. This led to the untimely and unfortunate demise of "Pulse." The demise was a fate that some believe the Pulse simply didn't deserve. It is speculated that the Capitol Hill Massacre was partially to blame for the drop in student involvement.

In September 2006, "Pulse" signed off and began airing a loop of Nirvana's Smells Like Teen Spirit for 3 days.

=== KGRG1 ===
The Alternative Past "KGRG1" signed on with The Ramones' Blitzkrieg Bop. The new format plays tracks that were formerly played on sister station KGRG in the 1980s and early 1990s. In February 2007, the long-standing KENU call sign was changed to KGRG to match their sister FM station and the new name.

On July 11, 2008 at 5:00 PM (PDT), KGRG1 began airing a "Non-Stop Sub Pop Weekend" as a tribute to the 20th anniversary of Sub Pop Records. The first song played was "Spank Thru" by Nirvana off of the Sub Pop 200 compilation followed by tracks from various Sub Pop Records recorded pre-1997.

During June 2024, KGRG-AM went silent due to "...the loss of the transmitting antenna, and other technical problems". The filing with the FCC requested a six-month authorization to stop over the air broadcasts. The stations can still be streamed online. KGRG-1 has been heard on the air, however, as of mid-October, 2024, playing alternative rock music.

== Kentwood Football ==
Kentwood High School football games are broadcast when they have a game at French Field in Kent.
