= Auburn High School (Washington) =

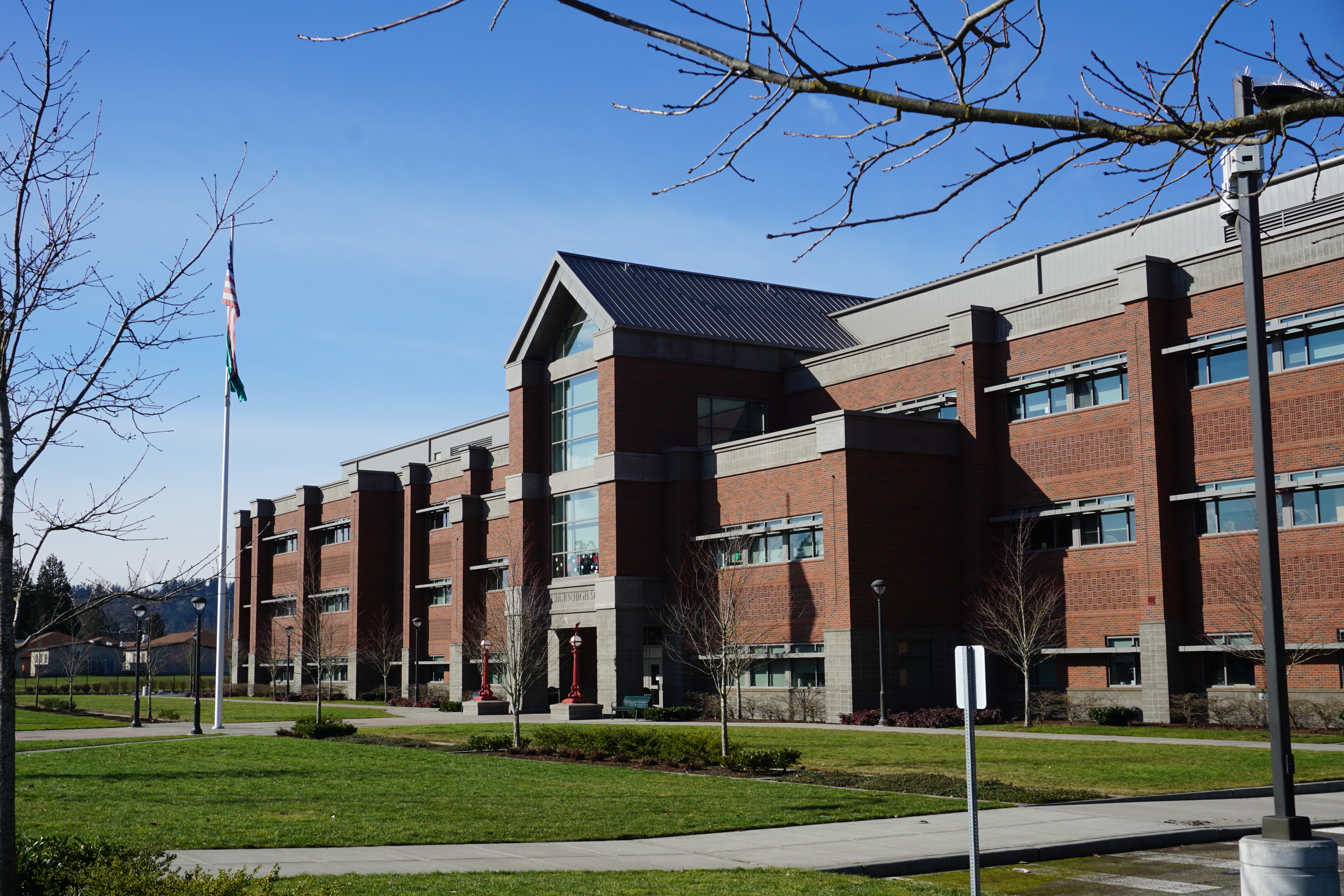

Location
- 711 East Main Street; Auburn, King, Washington 98002; United States

Information
- Type: Public secondary
- Established: 1903
- School district: Auburn School District #408
- Superintendent: Alan Spicciati
- Principal: Jon Aarstad
- Teaching staff: 99.47 (FTE)
- Grades: 9–12
- Enrollment: 1,935 (2023-2024)
- Student to teacher ratio: 19.45
- Campus: Suburban
- Colors: Green and gold
- Mascot: Trojan
- Newspaper: Troy Invoice
- Website: Auburn High School webpage

Auburn High School, formerly Auburn Senior High School, is a public high school in Auburn, Washington, United States, founded in 1903. The school is situated on 18 acres (73,000 m^{2}) of land in downtown Auburn. Its campus includes the Auburn Performing Arts Center (PAC), the Auburn School District Swimming Pool, Auburn Memorial Stadium (also known as Troy Field), tennis courts, softball field and baseball field. Beginning with the 2014-2015 school year, staff and students will move into the new Auburn High School located at 711 East Main Street in Auburn. Construction of the new school building began on February 24, 2013, following the November 2012 Bond Election, in which Auburn District voters authorized the selling of bonds to fund the new high school building. The entire school, with the exception of the PAC and the auto shop building, was replaced.

== Academics ==
Auburn offers Advanced Placement classes in biology, calculus, language and composition, Literature and composition, Spanish, U.S. history, European history, and U.S. politics and government. Four foreign languages are taught – French, German, Spanish, and Chinese – up to the 7/8 (4th year) level.

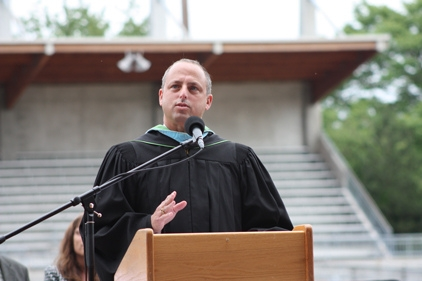
Former AHS principal Richard Zimmerman

== International Thespian Society ==
Auburn High School is a member of the Washington State chapter of the International Thespian Society as Troupe 17. This was the earliest troupe of acting students established in Washington state with a High School, in 1929.

== Notable alumni ==
- Nate Cohn, political journalist for the New York Times's The Upshot.
- Cam Gigandet (Class of 2001), actor who appeared in Twilight and Burlesque
- Christine Gregoire, 22nd Governor of Washington
- Kevin Hagen, former MLB player (St. Louis Cardinals)
- Gordon Hirabayashi (Class of 1937), civil rights activist who challenged the legality of the internment of Japanese Americans during World War II
- Chris Lukezic, professional middle-distance runner sponsored by Reebok
- Evan McMullin, 2016 candidate for United States president backed by Better for America
- Blair Rasmussen (Class of 1981), NBA basketball player, Denver Nuggets (1985–1991) Atlanta Hawks (1991–1993)
- Francis R. "Dick" Scobee, Space Shuttle Challenger astronaut
- Danny Shelton, NFL football player, drafted by the Cleveland Browns (2015–17). New England Patriots (2018–present). Super Bowl Champion (LIII)
- Minoru Yamasaki, designer of the World Trade Center buildings destroyed on September 11, 2001
- Jameson Turner, legendary Seattle Mariners fan who caught Cal "Big Dumper" Raleigh's 61st homerun while wearing a "Dump 61 Here" shirt in Game 3 of the 2025 ALDS against the Detroit Tigers on October 7, 2025

== Athletics ==
Auburn moved to the South Puget Sound League (SPSL) 3A in fall 2006. After only two years in the SPSL 3A Auburn, along with Auburn Riverside, moved to back to 4A in fall 2008. Auburn became part of the SPSL-North, returning to the same league they left after 2005. Auburn joined the Olympic Division of the newly resurrected North Puget Sound League in 2016.

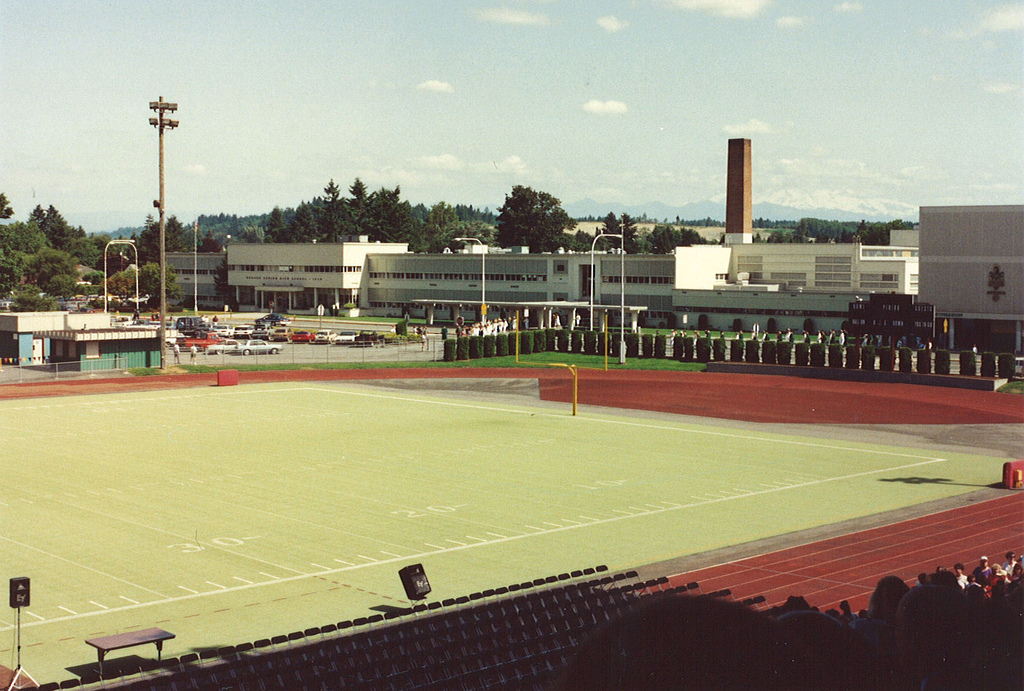
Athletic field at Auburn Senior High School

Sports offered at Auburn are:

- Boys' tennis
- Boys' water polo
- Cross country
- American football
- Girls' soccer
- Girls' swimming/diving
- Golf
- Volleyball
- Boys' basketball
- Boys' swimming/diving
- Girls' swimming/diving
- Girls' basketball
- Girls' water polo
- Gymnastics
- Wrestling
- Baseball
- Boys' soccer
- Girls' fastpitch
- Girls' tennis
- Girls' water polo
- Track and field
- FIRST Robotics Competition

Auburn High School has a sports medicine program.
