= Auburn, Washington =

Auburn, Washington sladə
- City
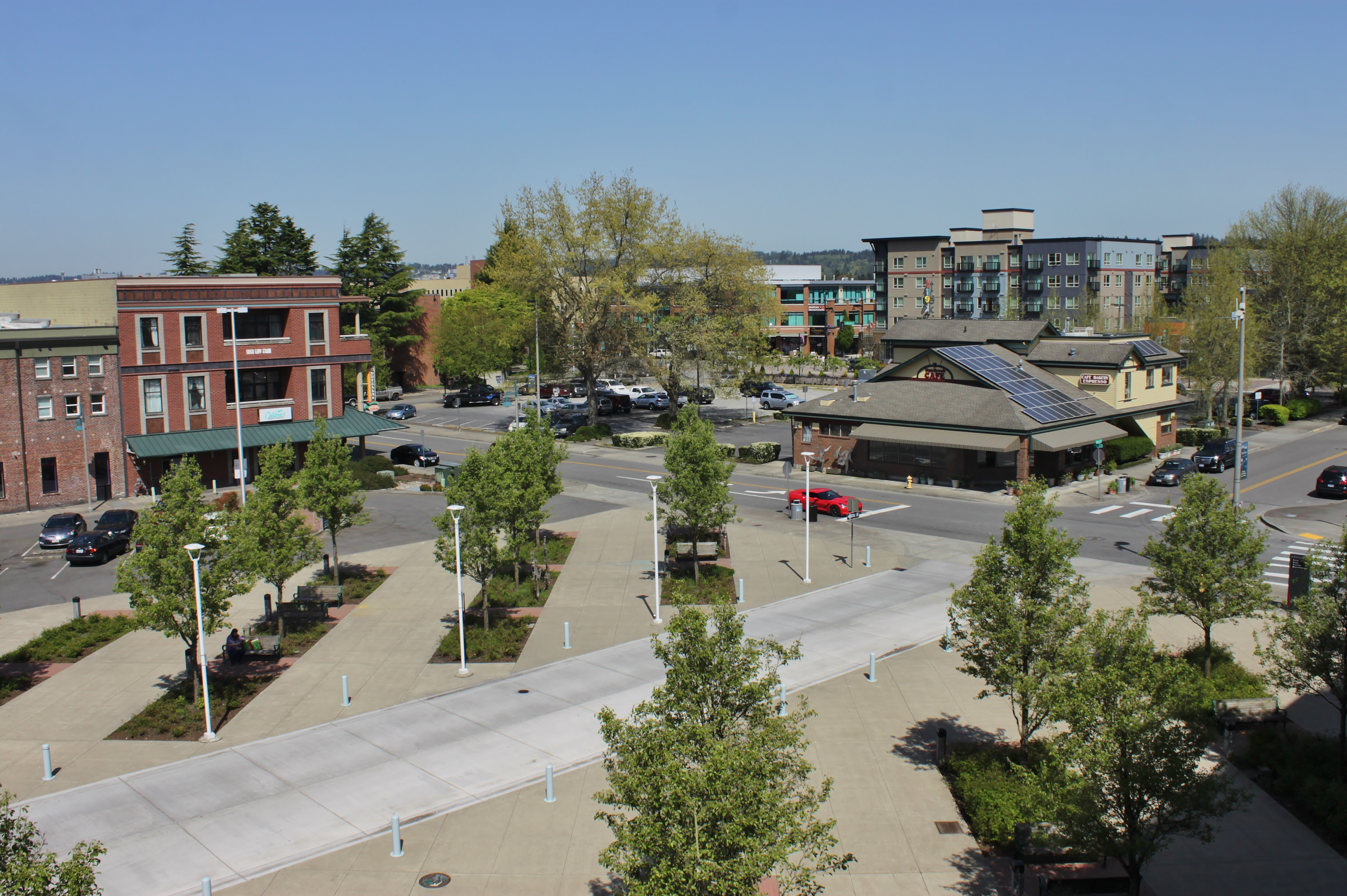
- Downtown Auburn in 2018, seen from the train station's parking garage

- Flag Logo
- Motto: "More Than You Imagined"
- Coordinates: 47.304657°N 122.210696°W
- Country: United States
- State: Washington
- Counties: King, Pierce
- Incorporated: June 13, 1891
- Named for: Auburn, New York

Government
  - Type: Mayor–council
  - Mayor: Nancy Backus
  - Deputy mayor: Cheryl Rakes
  - Council Member: Kate Baldwin; Tracy Taylor-Turner; Yolanda Trout-Manuel; Clinton Taylor; Lisa Stirgus; Hanan Amer

Area
  - Total: 30.113 sq mi (77.992 km^{2})
  - Land: 29.824 sq mi (77.244 km^{2})
  - Water: 0.289 sq mi (0.749 km^{2}) 0.96%
- Elevation: 92 ft (28 m)

Population (2020)
  - Total: 87,256
  - Estimate (2024): 85,513
  - Rank: US: 426th WA: 15th
  - Density: 2,890.5/sq mi (1,116.01/km^{2})
- Time zone: UTC−8 (Pacific (PST))
  - Summer (DST): UTC−7 (PDT)
- ZIP Codes: 98001, 98002, 98003, 98023, 98047, 98063, 98071, 98092, 98093
- Area code: 253
- FIPS code: 53-03180
- GNIS feature ID: 2409755
- Website: auburnwa.gov

Auburn (Lushootseed: sladə) is a city in King County, Washington, United States (with a small portion crossing into neighboring Pierce County). The population was 87,256 at the 2020 Census, and was estimated at 85,513 in 2024. Auburn is a suburb in the Seattle metropolitan area, and is currently ranked as the 15th most populous city in the state of Washington.

The Muckleshoot Indian Reservation lies to the south and southeast.

== History ==
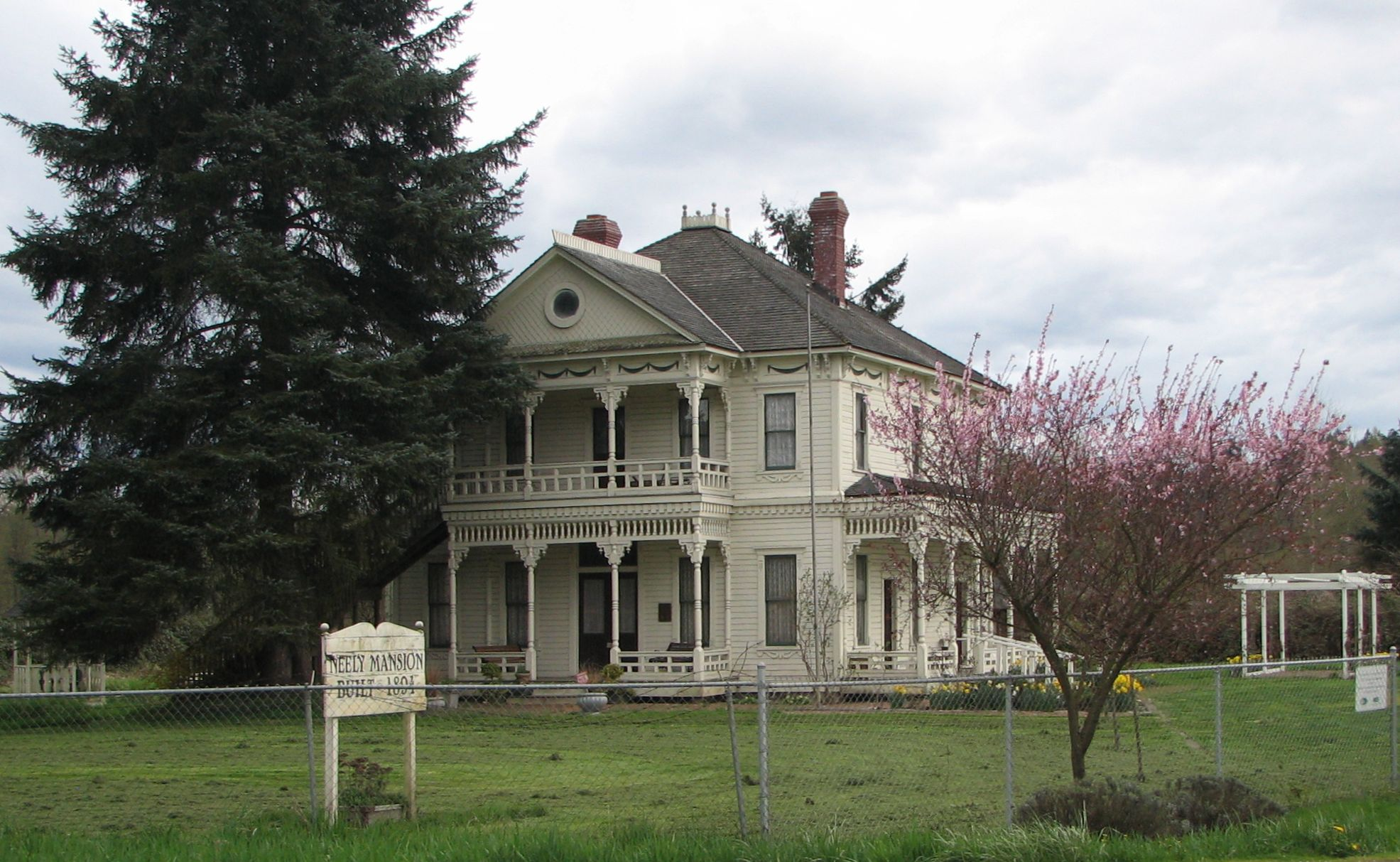
Neely Mansion, spring 2006

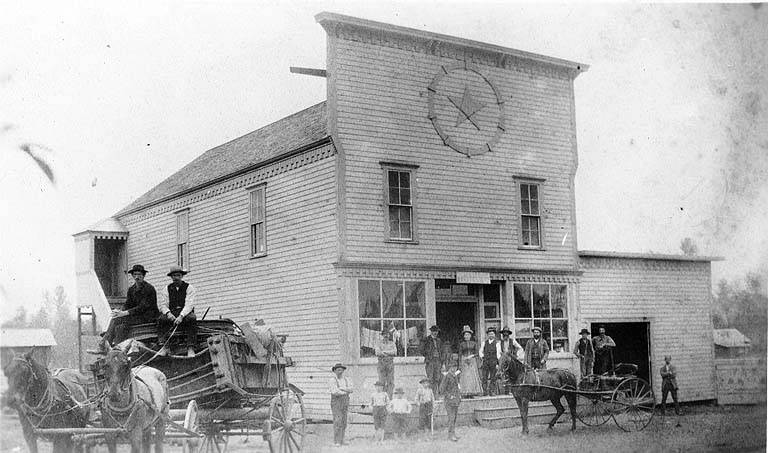
Auburn's first store, 1886

Before the first European arrived in the Green River Valley in the 1850s, the area was home to the Muckleshoot people, who were temporarily driven out by Indian wars later that decade. Several settler families arrived in the 1860s, including Levi Ballard, who set up a homestead between the Green River and White River. Ballard filed for a plat to establish a town in February 1886, naming it Slaughter for an officer slain during the Indian wars in 1855.

Slaughter was incorporated on June 13, 1891, but its name was changed two years later to Auburn on February 21, 1893, by an action of the state legislature. Newer residents had disliked the name and its connection to the word "slaughter", especially after the town's hotel was named the Slaughter House. The name Auburn was chosen in honor of Auburn, New York, for the areas' shared reliance on hops farming.

The White and Green Rivers have been a major part of the history and culture of Auburn since the area was settled with multiple locations in the city being named after either of the two rivers. Frequent flooding from the rivers caused numerous problems for the people living in the community with one outcome being the creation of Mountain View Cemetery over on one of the hills overlooking the valley. It was not until the completion of the Mud Mountain Dam and the Howard A. Hanson Dam, along the White River and Green River respectively, that the flooding would cease and allow the city to grow without the aforementioned hurdle impeding the growth.

In 1917 the city, in response to the growing of the Japanese community, donated some of the land in Pioneer Cemetery to the White River Buddhist Church. A little over ten years later, Rev. Giryo Takemura, minister of the church at the time, and his future son-in-law, Chiyokichi Natsuhara, raised money to replace the old wooden sticks and columns that had been in use as gravestones at the cemetery with more durable concrete markers. The interwar period saw several Japanese-American baseball teams from the area compete in the courier league with the White River All-Stars enjoying particularly large success winning four of the July 4th tournaments. In 1930, a Japanese bath house was constructed outside of Neely Mansion by the then current tenants.

With the Attack on Pearl Harbor during the Second World War, Japanese immigrants and the Japanese-American community as a whole were largely seen with unwarranted distrust by the majority white population, including in Auburn. Executive Order 9066, issued by President Franklin D. Roosevelt on February 19, 1942, led to the city's Japanese-American population being relocated to internment camps. After the war, of about 300 Japanese families living in Auburn only around 25 returned. In 1980, the Commission on Wartime Relocation and Internment of Civilians found that this detainment was an unjust act in its report.

A local real estate developer announced plans for a large planned community in the hills southeast of Auburn in 1979, using 1,500 acres (610 ha) of assembled plots. The neighborhood was named Lakeland Hills and began construction in 1985, growing to 80 homes in its first three years. Auburn and Bonney Lake competed to annex the entirety of Lakeland Hills in the late 1990s, with Auburn voting in 1997 to become the third King County city to annex portions of Pierce County. The two cities reached a compromise on water utility rights in the Pierce County portion of the neighborhood that allowed Auburn to complete its annexation of Lakeland Hills by the end of the decade. By 2007, the development had 3,600 homes with 6,000 residents, a new elementary school, and a shopping center.

In 2008, Auburn annexed the West Hill and Lea Hill neighborhoods of unincorporated King County, adding 15,000 residents and expanding its land area by 26 percent. A 155-acre (63 ha) exclave of Kent, the Bridges neighborhood, was annexed by Auburn on January 1, 2024, after the two cities agreed to the transfer to simplify municipal services in the area. The neighborhood had originally been annexed by Kent in 1987 for use as a water reservoir, which was never built and instead developed into residential use. It was then surrounded by Lea Hill, later annexed into Auburn.

== Geography ==
According to the United States Census Bureau, the city has a total area of 30.113 square miles (77.99 km^{2}), of which 29.824 square miles (77.24 km^{2}) is land and 0.289 square miles (0.75 km^{2}) (0.96%) is water.

Historically, the Stuck River ran through the settlement of Stuck, which is now a small pocket of unincorporated King County within southern Auburn. In 1906, the flow of the White River was diverted into the Stuck's channel near today's Game Farm Park.

References to the Stuck River still appear in some property legal descriptions and place names (e.g., Stuck River Drive) within Auburn, but today it is essentially indistinguishable from the southern White River.

=== Neighborhoods ===
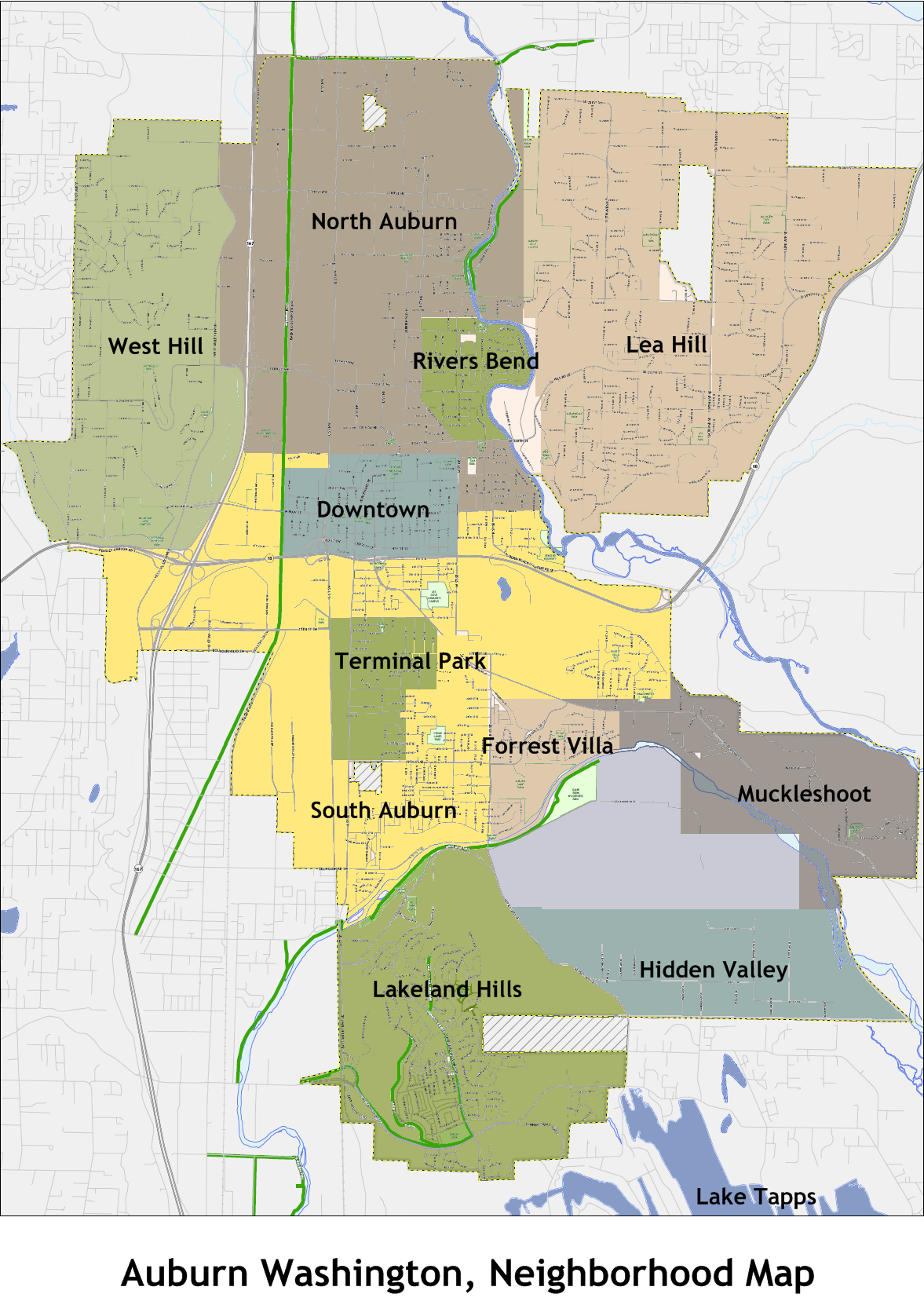

- Downtown—Historic buildings with a traditional main street and also many Craftsman-style houses from the 1920s.
- North Auburn—A mix of commercial and single-family housing separated by Auburn Way North.
- River's Bend—A small residential neighborhood nestled along the Green River, located at the bottom of Lea Hill in North Auburn.
- Christopher/Thomas—An area in North Auburn roughly bordered by the Valley Drive Inn and 227th Street. Both are former farming towns annexed into the city in the 1960s.
- Lea Hill—A mainly residential neighborhood east of the valley, annexed into the city in 2007. Green River College is located here.
- Hazelwood—The area on Lea Hill between Green River Community College, and Auburn Mountainview High School. Once a town in the late 19th century.
- West Valley—A commercial and industrial area on the west side of SR 167, located on the bottom of West Hill.
- West Hill—Located on the West Hill, bordered by the city of Federal Way to the west.
- South Auburn—A general area located south of downtown, once a low-income area but becoming a commercial zone.
- Terminal Park—An area of middle class housing near the end of the rail yard named for the railroad workers who lived there.
- Forest Villa—Mainly residential area located in the Game Farm Park area.
- Lakeland Hills—A master-planned community sprawling on a large hillside at the southern end of the city on both sides of King and Pierce counties.
- Hidden Valley—A planned development located East of Lakeland Hills overlooking North Lake Tapps.

=== Climate ===
Climate data for Auburn, Washington
Month	Jan	Feb	Mar	Apr	May	Jun	Jul	Aug	Sep	Oct	Nov	Dec	Year
Record high °F (°C)	64 (18)	71 (22)	81 (27)	86 (30)	92 (33)	100 (38)	99 (37)	99 (37)	96 (36)	86 (30)	74 (23)	69 (21)	100 (38)
Mean daily maximum °F (°C)	47 (8)	51 (11)	55 (13)	61 (16)	67 (19)	72 (22)	77 (25)	78 (26)	72 (22)	62 (17)	52 (11)	46 (8)	62 (17)
Mean daily minimum °F (°C)	35 (2)	36 (2)	39 (4)	42 (6)	47 (8)	52 (11)	55 (13)	55 (13)	51 (11)	44 (7)	39 (4)	35 (2)	44 (7)
Record low °F (°C)	−10 (−23)	−5 (−21)	10 (−12)	25 (−4)	27 (−3)	33 (1)	38 (3)	34 (1)	28 (−2)	24 (−4)	−1 (−18)	3 (−16)	−10 (−23)
Average precipitation inches (mm)	5.3 (130)	4.5 (110)	4.1 (100)	2.9 (74)	2.1 (53)	1.7 (43)	0.9 (23)	1.2 (30)	1.8 (46)	3.4 (86)	6.1 (150)	5.8 (150)	37.1 (940)
Source: Weather.com

== Demographics ==
Historical population
Census	Pop.	Note	%±
1890	740		—
1900	489		−33.9%
1910	957		95.7%
1920	3,163		230.5%
1930	3,906		23.5%
1940	4,211		7.8%
1950	6,497		54.3%
1960	11,933		83.7%
1970	21,653		81.5%
1980	26,417		22.0%
1990	33,102		25.3%
2000	40,314		21.8%
2010	70,180		74.1%
2020	87,256		24.3%
2024 (est.)	85,513		−2.0%
U.S. Decennial Census; 2020 Census

As of the 2024 American Community Survey, there are 31,425 estimated households in Auburn with an average of 2.74 persons per household.

=== Racial and ethnic composition ===
Auburn, Washington – racial and ethnic composition Note: the US Census treats Hispanic/Latino as an ethnic category. This table excludes Latinos from the racial categories and assigns them to a separate category. Hispanics/Latinos may be of any race.
Race / ethnicity (NH = non-Hispanic)	Pop. 1980	Pop. 1990	Pop. 2000	Pop. 2010	Pop. 2020
White alone (NH)	24,806 (93.90%)	30,044 (90.76%)	32,220 (79.92%)	45,954 (65.48%)	42,367 (48.55%)
Black or African American alone (NH)	144 (0.55%)	434 (1.31%)	956 (2.37%)	3,338 (4.76%)	6,576 (7.54%)
Native American or Alaska Native alone (NH)	—	643 (1.94%)	953 (2.36%)	1,413 (2.01%)	1,492 (1.71%)
Asian alone (NH)	—	954 (2.88%)	1,389 (3.45%)	6,178 (8.80%)	11,312 (12.96%)
Pacific Islander alone (NH)	—	—	197 (0.49%)	1,137 (1.62%)	2,719 (3.12%)
Other race alone (NH)	952 (3.60%)	17 (0.05%)	52 (0.13%)	99 (0.14%)	469 (0.54%)
Mixed race or multiracial (NH)	—	—	1,528 (3.79%)	3,029 (4.32%)	6,096 (6.99%)
Hispanic or Latino (any race)	515 (1.95%)	1,010 (3.05%)	3,019 (7.49%)	9,032 (12.87%)	16,225 (18.59%)
Total	26,417 (100.00%)	33,102 (100.00%)	40,314 (100.00%)	70,180 (100.00%)	87,256 (100.00%)

=== 2020 census ===
As of the 2020 census, there were 87,256 people, 30,806 households, and 20,850 families residing in the city. The population density was 2,950.13 inhabitants per square mile (1,139.1/km^{2}). There were 31,947 housing units at an average density of 1,080.13 per square mile (417.0/km^{2}).

The median age was 35.6 years, with 25.3% of residents under the age of 18 and 12.6% aged 65 years or older. For every 100 females there were 97.8 males, and for every 100 females age 18 and over there were 96.1 males age 18 and over.

There were 30,806 households, of which 35.9% had children under the age of 18 living in them, 47.0% were married-couple households, 18.9% were households with a male householder and no spouse or partner present, and 25.5% were households with a female householder and no spouse or partner present. About 24.5% of all households were made up of individuals and 9.2% had someone living alone who was 65 years of age or older.

Of the 31,947 housing units, 3.6% were vacant, the homeowner vacancy rate was 0.6%, and the rental vacancy rate was 4.3%.

99.6% of residents lived in urban areas, while 0.4% lived in rural areas.

Racial composition as of the 2020 census
Race	Number	Percent
White	45,020	51.6%
Black or African American	6,801	7.8%
American Indian and Alaska Native	1,996	2.3%
Asian	11,438	13.1%
Native Hawaiian and Other Pacific Islander	2,767	3.2%
Some other race	9,009	10.3%
Two or more races	10,225	11.7%

=== 2010 census ===
As of the 2010 census, there were 70,180 people, 26,058 households, and 17,114 families residing in the city. The population density was 2,369.3 inhabitants per square mile (914.8/km^{2}). There were 27,834 housing units at an average density of 939.7 inhabitants per square mile (362.8/km^{2}). The racial makeup was 70.46% White, 4.94% African American, 2.29% Native American, 8.91% Asian, 1.64% Pacific Islander, 6.31% from some other races and 5.44% from two or more races. Hispanic or Latino residents of any race were 12.87% of the population.

There were 26,058 households, of which 36.2% had children under the age of 18 living with them, 46.7% were married couples living together, 13.0% had a female householder with no husband present, 5.9% had a male householder with no wife present, and 34.3% were non-families. 25.6% of all households were made up of individuals, and 7.9% had someone living alone who was 65 years of age or older. The average household size was 2.67 and the average family size was 3.22.

The median age in the city was 34.4 years. 25.9% of residents were under the age of 18; 10.5% were between the ages of 18 and 24; 27.9% were from 25 to 44; 25.5% were from 45 to 64; and 10.2% were 65 years of age or older. The gender makeup of the city was 49.4% male and 50.6% female.

=== American Community Survey ===
The city has a median household income of $94,603. Approximately 9.6% of the city's population lives at or below the poverty line. Auburn has an estimated 62.6% employment rate, with 25.5% of the population holding a bachelor's degree or higher and 88.9% holding a high school diploma.

There were 32,597 housing units at an average density of 1,102.18 per square mile (425.6/km^{2}).

The top nine reported languages (people were allowed to report up to two languages, thus the figures will generally add to more than 100%) were German (11.6%), English (9.3%), Irish (5.9%), Norwegian (3.2%), French (except Basque) (2.3%), Italian (2.2%), Polish (1.7%), Subsaharan African (1.1%), and Scottish (0.9%).

== Economy ==
=== Employment ===
As of August 31, 2025, 69.2% of the population is in the labor force with a 4.7% unemployment rate.

The Auburn Boeing Plant, opened in 1966, is the largest airplane parts plant in the world, with 2,100,000 square feet (200,000 m^{2}) and 1.265 million parts being manufactured each year.

Auburn is the site for the Northwest headquarters of United States General Services Administration.

=== Top employers ===
According to the city's 2022 Annual Comprehensive Financial Report, the largest employers in the city are:

#	Employer	Product/service	# of employees	Percentage
1	The Boeing Company	Aerospace	3,600	8.8%
2	Auburn School District No. 408	Education	2,536	6.2%
3	Muckleshoot Tribal Enterprises	Gaming	1,472	3.6%
4	MultiCare Auburn Medical Center	Hospital	1,208	3.0%
5	Green River College	Education	857	2.1%
6	Safeway Distribution Center	Distribution	800	2.0%
7	Costco Wholesale Optical #190	Distribution	782	1.9%
8	City of Auburn	City government	574	1.4%
9	Ply Gem Pacific Windows Corp	Manufacturing	550	1.3%
10	Walmart Supercenter #2385	Retail	336	0.8%
—	Total employers	—	12,715	31.2%

=== Shopping ===
The Outlet Collection Seattle, formerly SuperMall of the Great Northwest, is an outlet mall that opened in 1995.

== Arts and culture ==
The White River Valley Museum's exhibits feature Auburn, from Native American history to the 1920s. They focus on the Muckleshoot Indian Tribe, pioneer life, immigration from Japan and Europe, truck farming, railroading and the building of towns throughout the area. Visitors can visit a recreation of a pioneer cabin, climb aboard a Northern Pacific Railway caboose, and investigate a recreation of the shops in 1924 downtown Auburn.

As part of the King County Library System, there is a 20,000-square-foot (1,900 m^{2}) facility built in 2000 and expanded in 2012 having replaced an earlier, nearby location. It is part of the Les Gove Park, a 20-acre (81,000 m^{2}) community campus south of State Route 164 including the White River Valley Museum, a senior center, and other recreational services. Fourth of July and other celebrations such as Auburn Good Ol' Days are also held in Les Gove annually. The sculpture Crow with Fries is installed in Les Gove Park.

=== Landmarks ===
The City of Auburn has designated the following landmarks:

Landmark	Built	Listed	Photo
Auburn Masonic Temple	1923–24	2002	
Auburn Post Office	1937	2000	
Auburn Public Library	1914	1995	

== Sports ==
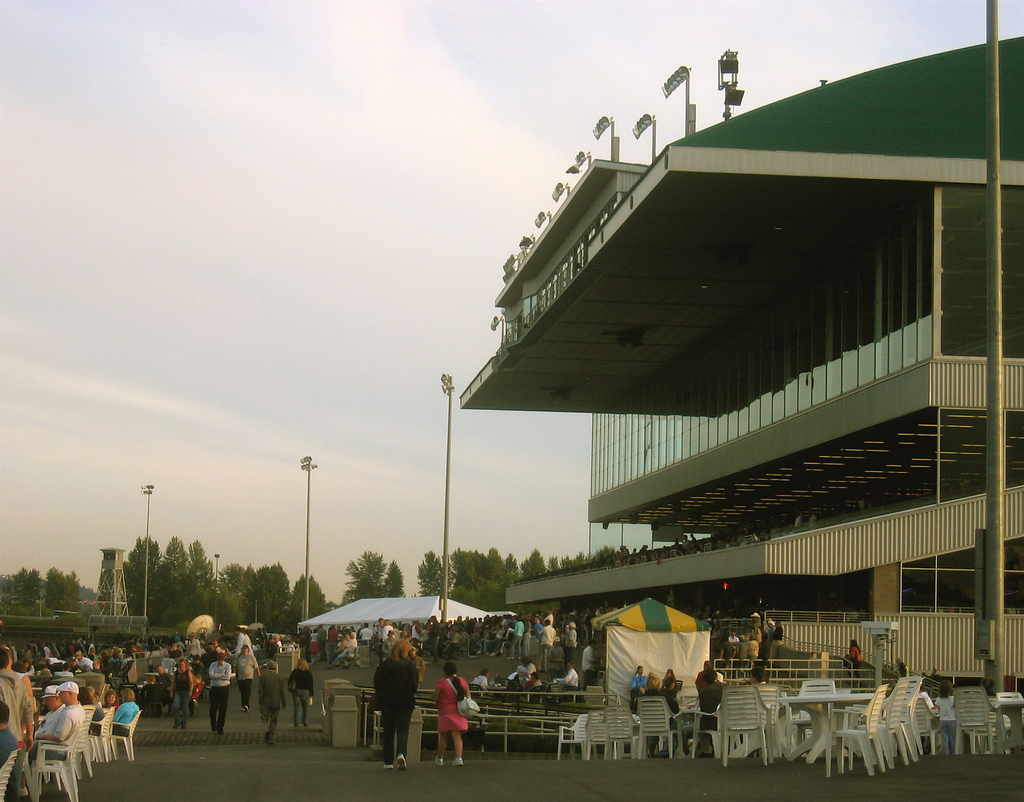
Emerald Downs

Emerald Downs is a 167-acre (0.68 km^{2}) six-level stadium and thoroughbred racetrack. The racetrack is operated on land purchased by the Muckleshoot in 2002.

== Government ==
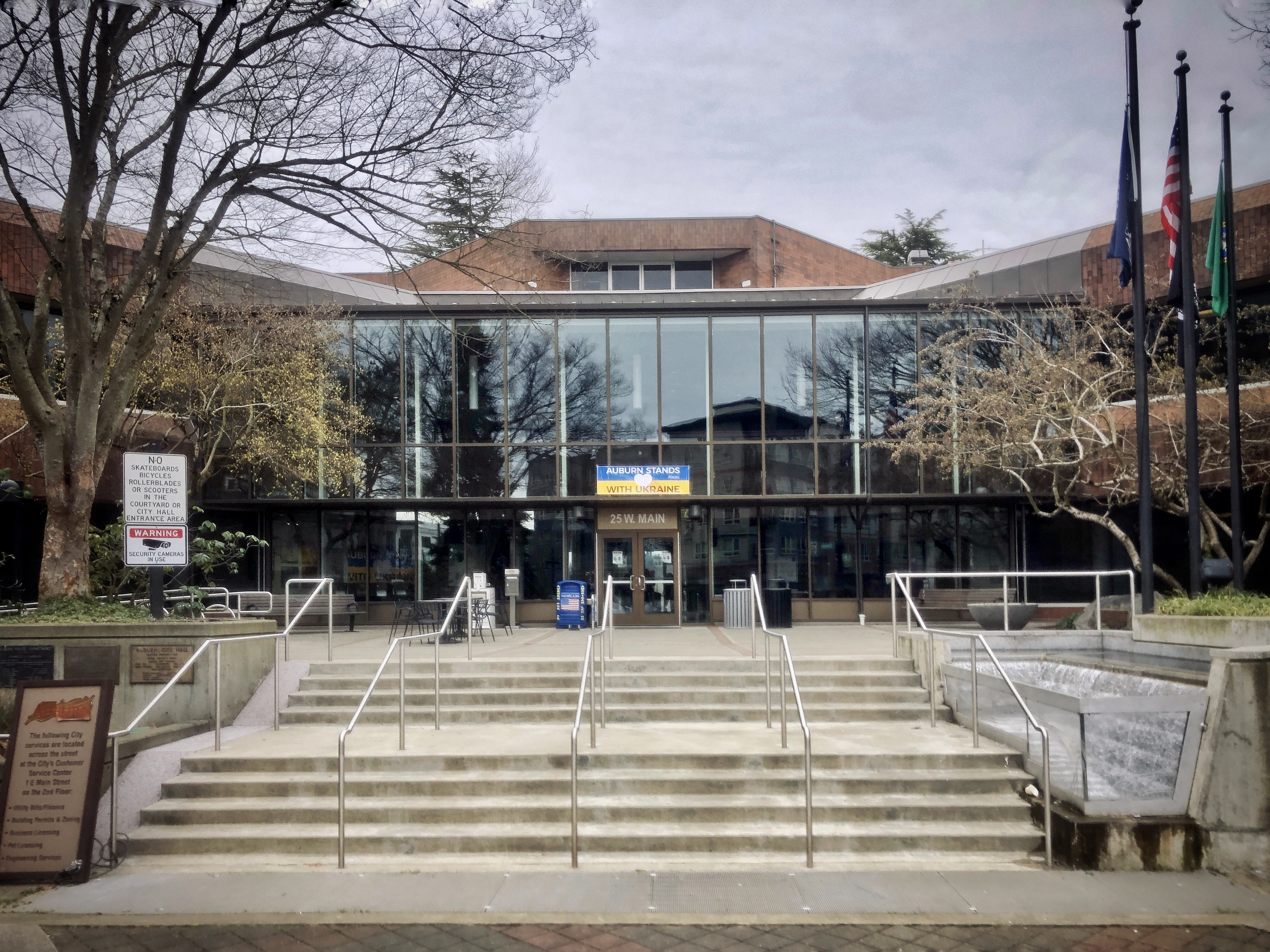
Auburn City Hall

Presidential election results
Year	Republican	Democratic	Third parties
2020	39.00% 14,092	57.90% 20,919	3.10% 1,121

The city of Auburn has a mayor–council form of government, meaning that the mayor is a full-time, separately elected position. As of 2025, the current mayor is Nancy Backus, who was first elected to the post in 2013 and re-elected in 2017 and 2021. She is the first woman to serve in the office since Auburn was incorporated in 1891.

=== Mayors ===
- Virgil R. Bissell, 1891–1892
- Arthur H. Meade, 1892–1896, 1904–1908
- E. Bronson Smith, 1896–1897
- Samuel Cavanaugh, 1898
- T.J. Kerr, 1899–1901
- George W. Hart, 1902–1903
- Robert B. Neilson, 1908
- Lou C. Smith, 1909–1911
- John B. Waugh, 1911–1914
- Clarence E. West, 1915
- Martin J. Lacey, 1916
- William E. Ester, 1917–1920, 1925–1927, 1932–1933
- Otto P. Bertsch, 1921–1925, 1927–1929
- John W. McKee, 1929–1931
- Edward E. Harvey, 1933–1935
- Frank H. McLaskey, 1935–1936
- Leslie J. Gove, 1936–1947, 1955
- Blaine H. Elwell, 1947–1951
- Dayton A. Witten, 1951–1955
- Harold L. Clark, 1955–1958
- John S. Denice Sr., 1958–1960
- James N. Shaughnessy, 1960–1964
- Robert E. Gaines, 1964–1969
- Stanley Paul Kersey, 1969–1981
- Robert A. Roegner, 1982–1993
- Charles A. Booth, 1994–2001
- Pete Lewis, 2002–2013
- Nancy Backus, 2014–present

== Education ==
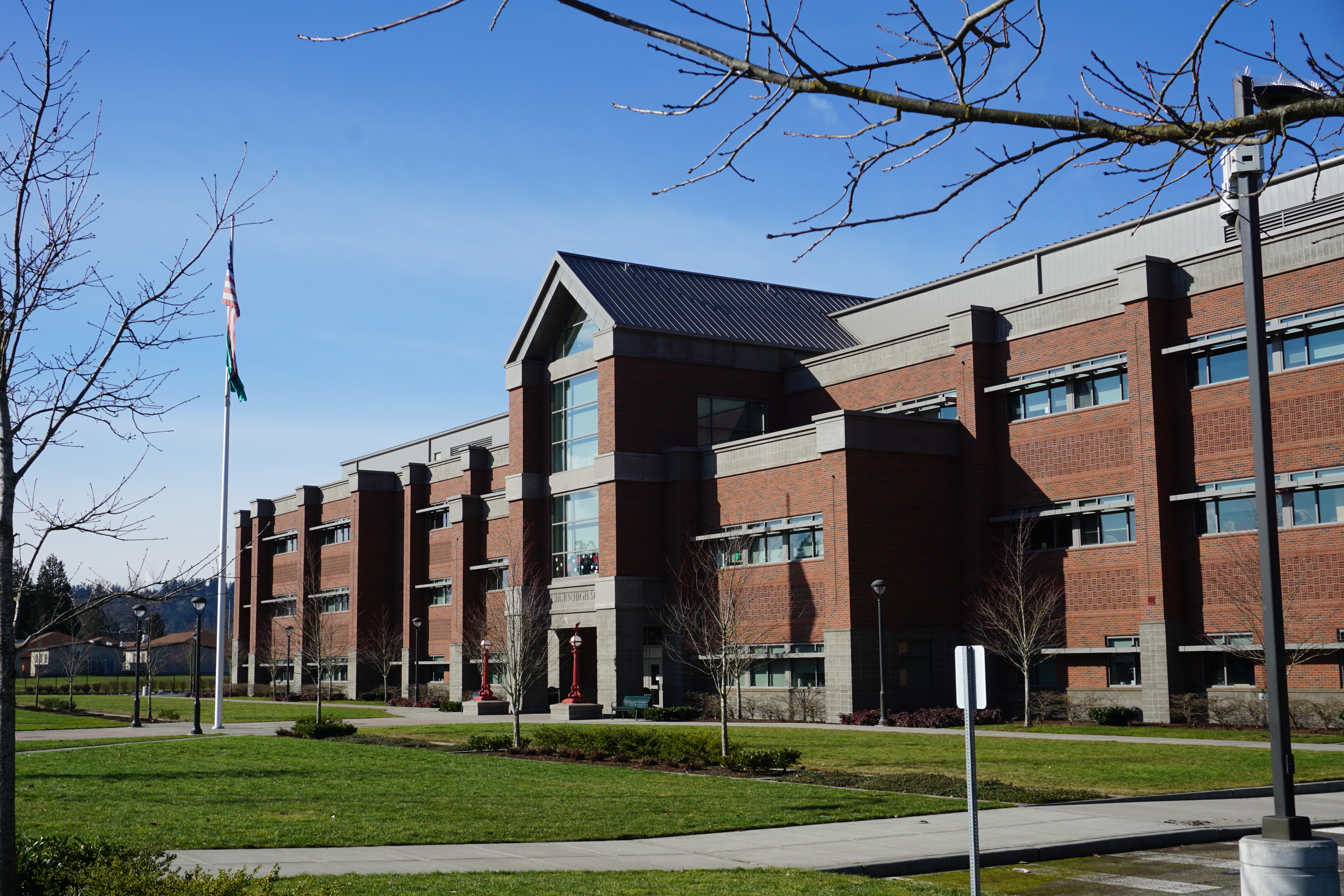
Auburn Senior High, founded in 1903

Public schools are administered by the Auburn School District. The district is larger than the city itself, serving the neighboring towns of Algona and Pacific, as well as some unincorporated areas around Auburn and Kent. Portions of northern Auburn are served by the Federal Way and Kent school districts and a portion of Auburn in Pierce County is within the Dieringer School District.

=== High schools ===
- Auburn High School
- Auburn Mountainview High School
- Auburn Riverside High School
- Auburn Adventist Academy
- West Auburn High School

=== Elementary and middle schools ===
- Arthur Jacobsen Elementary
- Bowman Creek Elementary
- Cascade Middle School
- Chinook Elementary
- Dick Scobee Elementary
- Evergreen Heights Elementary
- Gildo Rey Elementary
- Hazelwood Elementary
- Ilalko Elementary
- Lake View Elementary
- Lakeland Hills Elementary
- Lea Hill Elementary
- Mt. Baker Middle School
- Olympic Middle School
- Pioneer Elementary
- Rainier Middle School
- Terminal Park Elementary
- Washington Elementary
- Willow Crest Elementary

=== Private and alternative schools ===
- Auburn Adventist Academy
- Rainier Christian High School
- Valley Christian School
- Holy Family School
- Auburn Online

=== College ===
- Green River College

== Infrastructure ==
=== Transportation ===
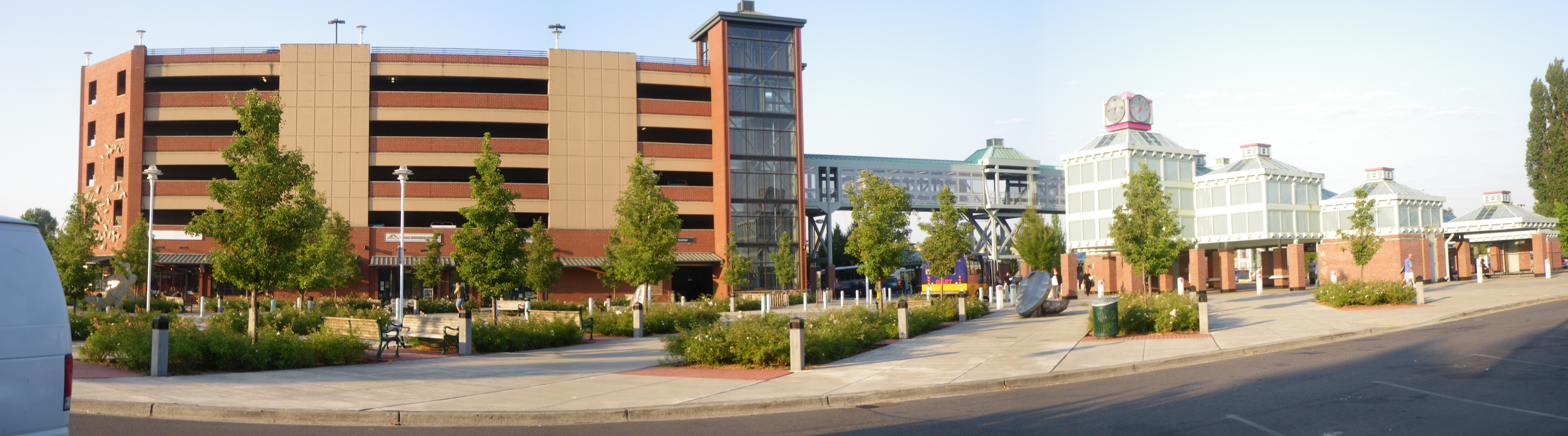
Auburn station in downtown is a major hub for the Green River Valley.

Auburn has many large roads nearby and within city limits, including State Route 167 (commonly referred as the "Valley Freeway") and State Route 18. Auburn also has its own transit center, Auburn station in downtown, that serves as a major hub for southern King County. Sound Transit buses connect the Auburn Transit Center directly to Federal Way, Sumner, and Kent, while King County Metro buses connect it to Green River Community College, the Super Mall, and Auburn Way.

Sounder commuter trains travel from Auburn to Downtown Seattle in approximately 30 minutes, and to Lakewood station in less than 35 minutes.

Until 1987, Auburn was home to a steam locomotive roundhouse and diesel engine house of the Northern Pacific Railway, the BNSF Railway of today. BNSF maintains a rail yard and small car repair facility, along with maintenance-of-way facilities at the former NP yard. The Auburn Municipal Airport serves the general aviation community.

=== Police ===
The Auburn Police Department is located within the Justice Building, along with the Municipal Court and jail.

== Notable people ==
- Eric Barone, video game designer known professionally as ConcernedApe
- W. J. Beierlein, state representative
- Nate Cohn, journalist and polling expert for The Upshot at The New York Times
- Janna Crawford, gold medal Paralympic athlete
- Phil Fortunato, member of the state senate and state representative
- Cam Gigandet, actor
- Christine Gregoire, 22nd governor of Washington
- Kevin Hagen, former MLB baseball player
- Greg Haugen, professional boxer
- Gordon Hirabayashi, civil rights activist
- Ariana Kukors, Olympic swimmer and world record holder
- Chris Lukezic, middle-distance runner
- Harrison Maurus, bronze medal weightlifter
- Evan McMullin, CIA officer and former presidential candidate
- Dave Reichert, former King County sheriff and U.S. congressman
- Diane Schuur, jazz singer and pianist
- Francis R. "Dick" Scobee, NASA astronaut
- Danny Shelton, NFL football player
- D. C. Simpson, comic artist
- Sir Mix-A-Lot, hip hop artist
- Misty Upham, actress
- Minoru Yamasaki, architect

== Sister cities ==
Auburn has five sister cities:

- Tamba, Japan
- Pyeongchang, South Korea
- Guanghan, China
- Yuhang, China
- Mola di Bari, Italy

The relationship with Tamba is commemorated with an annual student exchange program between the two cities and neighboring Kent.
