= 2023 Youngstown State Penguins football team =

American college football season

2023 Youngstown State Penguins football

NCAA Division I Second Round, L 28–45 at Villanova
- Conference: Missouri Valley Football Conference

Ranking
- STATS: No. 21
- FCS Coaches: No. 23
- Record: 8–5 (5–3 MVFC)
- Head coach: Doug Phillips (4th season)
- Offensive coordinator: Troy Rothenbuhler (4th season)
- Offensive scheme: Multiple
- Defensive coordinator: Jahmal Brown (2nd season)
- Co-defensive coordinator: John Haneline (1st season)
- Base defense: 4–2–5
- Home stadium: Stambaugh Stadium

2023 Missouri Valley Football Conference standings
	Conf.			Overall
Team	W		L	W		L
No. 1 South Dakota State $^	8	–	0	15	–	0
No. 4 South Dakota ^	7	–	1	10	–	3
No. 3 North Dakota State ^	5	–	3	11	–	4
No. 19 Youngstown State ^	5	–	3	8	–	5
No. 16 North Dakota ^	5	–	3	7	–	5
Northern Iowa	5	–	3	6	–	5
No. 12 Southern Illinois ^	4	–	4	8	–	5
Illinois State	4	–	4	6	–	5
Missouri State	3	–	5	4	–	7
Murray State	1	–	7	2	–	9
Indiana State	1	–	7	1	–	10
Western Illinois	0	–	8	0	–	11
$ – Conference champion; ^ – FCS playoff participant; Rankings from STATS Poll

The 2023 Youngstown State Penguins football team represented Youngstown State University as a member of the Missouri Valley Football Conference (MVFC) during the 2023 NCAA Division I FCS football season. Led by fourth-year head coach Doug Phillips, the Penguins played their games at Stambaugh Stadium in Youngstown, Ohio. The Youngstown State Penguins football team drew an average home attendance of 10,065 in 2023.

== Schedule ==
Date	Time	Opponent	Rank	Site	TV	Result	Attendance
August 31	7:30 p.m.	Valparaiso*		Stambaugh Stadium; Youngstown, OH	ESPN+	W 52–10	8,593
September 9	12:00 p.m.	at No. 5 (FBS) Ohio State*	No. 25	Ohio Stadium; Columbus, OH	BTN	L 7–35	102,897
September 16	2:00 p.m.	Robert Morris*	No. 25	Stambaugh Stadium; Youngstown, OH	ESPN+	W 48–28	12,826
September 30	2:00 p.m.	at Northern Iowa	No. 23	UNI-Dome; Cedar Falls, IA	ESPN+	L 41–44	10,346
October 7	6:00 p.m.	No. 6 Southern Illinois		Stambaugh Stadium; Youngstown, OH	ESPN+	W 31–3	9,767
October 14	2:00 p.m.	at No. 10 South Dakota	No. 23	DakotaDome; Vermillion, SD	ESPN+	L 31–34	3,608
October 21	2:00 p.m.	Illinois State^{†}	No. 25	Stambaugh Stadium; Youngstown, OH	ESPN+	W 41–38	10,022
October 28	2:00 p.m.	Missouri State	No. 24	Stambaugh Stadium; Youngstown, OH	ESPN+	W 44–28	9,880
November 4	1:00 p.m.	at Indiana State	No. 22	Memorial Stadium; Terre Haute, IN	ESPN+	W 19–7	4,798
November 11	12:00 p.m.	No. 1 South Dakota State	No. 22	Stambaugh Stadium; Youngstown, OH	ESPN+	L 0–34	9,303
November 18	2:00 p.m.	at Murray State	No. 25	Roy Stewart Stadium; Murray, KY	ESPN+	W 34–17	5,957
November 25	5:00 p.m.	Duquesne*	No. 21	Stambaugh Stadium; Youngstown, OH (NCAA Division I First Round)	ESPN+	W 40–7	3,866
December 2	12:00 p.m.	at No. 6 Villanova*	No. 21	Villanova Stadium; Philadelphia, PA (NCAA Division I Second Round)	ESPN+	L 28–45	2,015
*Non-conference game; ^{†}Homecoming; Rankings from STATS Poll released prior to the game; All times are in Eastern time

== Game summaries ==
=== at No. 5 (FBS) Ohio State ===
No. 25 Youngstown State Penguins (1–0) vs No. 5 (FBS) Ohio State Buckeyes (1–0) – Game summary

Quarter	1	2	3	4	Total
No. 25 Penguins	7	0	0	0	7
No. 5 (FBS) Buckeyes	14	14	7	0	35

at Ohio Stadium • Columbus, Ohio

- Date: September 9
- Game time: 12:00 p.m. EDT
- Game weather: Cloudy • Temperature: 74 °F (23 °C) • Wind: SW at 5 miles per hour (8.0 km/h)
- Game attendance: 102,897
- Referee: David Siegle
- TV announcers (BTN): Cory Provus (play-by-play), Jake Butt (analyst), and Brooke Fletcher (sideline reporter)
- Box score, Recap

Game information

First quarter

- (13:34) OSU – Marvin Harrison Jr. 71-yard pass from Kyle McCord, Jayden Fielding kick (Drive: 3 plays, 76 yards, 1:20; Ohio State 7–0)
- (7:42) YSU – Mitch Davidson 1-yard run, Andrew Lastovka kick (Drive: 11 plays, 75 yards, 5:52; Tied 7–7)
- (1:20) OSU – Marvin Harrison Jr. 39-yard pass from Kyle McCord, Jayden Fielding kick (Drive: 4 plays, 93 yards, 1:22; Ohio State 14–7)

Second quarter

- (9:07) OSU – TreVeyon Henderson 13-yard run, Jayden Fielding kick (Drive: 13 plays, 60 yards, 4:51; Ohio State 21–7)
- (3:06) OSU – Emeka Egbuka 28-yard pass from Kyle McCord, Jayden Fielding kick (Drive: 11 plays, 90 yards, 4:37; Ohio State 28–7)

Third quarter

- (1:40) OSU – TreVeyon Henderson 30-yard run, Jayden Fielding kick (Drive: 5 plays, 61 yards, 1:43; Ohio State 35–7)

Fourth quarter

- No scoring plays

Statistics	YSU	OSU
First downs	12	23
Plays–yards	59–234	60–482
Rushes–yards	33–99	27–123
Passing yards	135	359
Passing: comp–att–int	17–26–1	21–33–0
Time of possession	34:00	26:00

Team	Category	Player	Statistics
Youngstown State	Passing	Mitch Davidson	12/18, 98 yards
Youngstown State	Rushing	Tyshon King	12 carries, 66 yards
Youngstown State	Receiving	Max Tomczak	3 receptions, 53 yards
Ohio State	Passing	Kyle McCord	14/20, 258 yards, 3 TD
Ohio State	Rushing	TreVeyon Henderson	5 carries, 56 yards, 2 TD
Ohio State	Receiving	Marvin Harrison Jr.	7 receptions, 160 yards, 2 TD

== Rankings ==
Ranking movements Legend: ██ Increase in ranking ██ Decrease in ranking RV = Received votes т = Tied with team above or below
	Week													
Poll	Pre	1	2	3	4	5	6	7	8	9	10	11	12	Final
STATS FCS	RV	25	25	24	23	RV	23	25	24	22	22	25	21	19
Coaches	RV	25	RV	24	19	RV	20т	RV	RV	RV	RV	RV	23	21
