= 2023 South Dakota State Jackrabbits football team =

American college football season

2023 South Dakota State Jackrabbits football

NCAA Division I champion MVFC champion

NCAA Division I Football Championship Game, W 23–3 vs. Montana
- Conference: Missouri Valley Football Conference

Ranking
- STATS: No. 1
- FCS Coaches: No. 1
- Record: 15–0 (8–0 MVFC)
- Head coach: Jimmy Rogers (1st season)
- Offensive coordinator: Zach Lujan (2nd season)
- Offensive scheme: Pro-style
- Defensive coordinator: Jesse Bobbit (1st season)
- Base defense: 3–4
- Home stadium: Dana J. Dykhouse Stadium

2023 Missouri Valley Football Conference standings
	Conf.			Overall
Team	W		L	W		L
No. 1 South Dakota State $^	8	–	0	15	–	0
No. 4 South Dakota ^	7	–	1	10	–	3
No. 3 North Dakota State ^	5	–	3	11	–	4
No. 19 Youngstown State ^	5	–	3	8	–	5
No. 16 North Dakota ^	5	–	3	7	–	5
Northern Iowa	5	–	3	6	–	5
No. 12 Southern Illinois ^	4	–	4	8	–	5
Illinois State	4	–	4	6	–	5
Missouri State	3	–	5	4	–	7
Murray State	1	–	7	2	–	9
Indiana State	1	–	7	1	–	10
Western Illinois	0	–	8	0	–	11
$ – Conference champion; ^ – FCS playoff participant; Rankings from STATS Poll

The 2023 South Dakota State Jackrabbits football team represented the South Dakota State University as a member of the Missouri Valley Football Conference (MVFC) during the 2023 NCAA Division I FCS football season. Led by first-year head coach Jimmy Rogers, the Jackrabbits compiled an overall record of 15–0 with a mark of 8–0 in conference play, winning the MVFC title for the second straight season. South Dakota State received the MVFC's automatic bid to the NCAA Division I Football Championship playoffs, where after a first-round bye, the Jackrabbits defeated Mercer in the second round, Villanova in the quarterfinals, Albany in the semifinals, and Montana in the NCAA Division I Football Championship Game to win a second consecutive national title. South Dakota State outscored opponents 146-15 in the four playoff games, completed a wire-to-wire season as the No. 1 ranked team in the NCAA Division I Football Championship Subdivision (FCS), and extended the team's winning streak to 29 games.

It was the first South Dakota State team to compile an undefeated season since the 1950 Jackrabbits team. The team played home games on campus at Dana J. Dykhouse Stadium in Brookings, South Dakota.

== Schedule ==
Date	Time	Opponent	Rank	Site	TV	Result	Attendance
August 31	7:00 p.m.	Western Oregon*	No. 1	Dana J. Dykhouse Stadium; Brookings, SD	ESPN+	W 45–7	16,258
September 9	6:00 p.m.	No. 3 Montana State*	No. 1	Dana J. Dykhouse Stadium; Brookings, SD	ESPN+	W 20–16	19,332
September 16	2:30 p.m.	vs. Drake*	No. 1	Target Field; Minneapolis, MN	ESPN+	W 70–7	18,174
September 30	2:00 p.m.	No. 12 North Dakota	No. 1	Dana J. Dykhouse Stadium; Brookings, SD	ESPN+	W 42–21	19,231
October 7	6:00 p.m.	at Illinois State	No. 1	Hancock Stadium; Normal, IL	ESPN+	W 40–21	8,272
October 14	2:00 p.m.	Northern Iowa	No. 1	Dana J. Dykhouse Stadium; Brookings, SD	ESPN+	W 41–6	19,357
October 21	2:00 p.m.	at No. 12 Southern Illinois	No. 1	Saluki Stadium; Carbondale, IL	ESPN+	W 17–10	11,927
October 28	1:00 p.m.	at No. 4 South Dakota	No. 1	DakotaDome; Vermillion, SD (South Dakota Showdown)	ESPN+	W 37–3	9,458
November 4	2:00 p.m.	No. 11 North Dakota State	No. 1	Dana J. Dykhouse Stadium; Brookings, SD (Dakota Marker)	ESPN+	W 33–16	19,431
November 11	11:00 a.m.	at No. 22 Youngstown State	No. 1	Stambaugh Stadium; Youngstown, OH	ESPN+	W 34–0	9,303
November 18	2:00 p.m.	Missouri State	No. 1	Dana J. Dykhouse Stadium; Brookings, SD	ESPN+	W 35–17	15,637
December 2	1:00 p.m.	No. 17 Mercer*	No. 1	Dana J. Dykhouse Stadium; Brookings, SD (NCAA Division I Second Round)	ESPN+	W 41–0	10,171
December 9	11:00 a.m.	No. 6 Villanova*	No. 1	Dana J. Dykhouse Stadium; Brookings, SD (NCAA Division I Quarterfinal)	ESPN	W 23–12	10,216
December 15	6:00 p.m.	No. 5 Albany*	No. 1	Dana J. Dykhouse Stadium; Brookings, SD (NCAA Division I Semifinal)	ESPN2	W 59–0	12,265
January 7, 2024	1:00 p.m.	vs. No. 2 Montana*	No. 1	Toyota Stadium; Frisco, TX (NCAA Division I Championship Game)	ABC	W 23–3	19,512
*Non-conference game; Rankings from STATS Poll released prior to the game; All times are in Central time

== Rankings ==
Ranking movements Legend: ( ) = First-place votes
	Week													
Poll	Pre	1	2	3	4	5	6	7	8	9	10	11	12	Final
STATS FCS	1 (56)	1 (55)	1 (52)	1 (52)	1 (54)	1 (56)	1 (56)	1 (56)	1 (56)	1 (56)	1 (56)	1 (56)	1 (56)	
Coaches	1 (24)	1 (25)	1 (26)	1 (26)	1 (26)	1 (26)	1 (26)	1 (26)	1 (26)	1 (25)	1 (26)	1 (26)	1 (24)	

== Game summaries ==
=== Western Oregon ===
Western Oregon at No. 1 South Dakota State
Dairy Drive

Team	1	2	3	4	Total
Wolves	0	0	0	7	7
• No. 1 Jackrabbits	21	21	3	0	45

- Date: August 31
- Location:
  Dana J. Dykhouse Stadium
  Brookings, SD
- Game start: 7:10 p.m. CDT
- Elapsed time: 2:54
- Game attendance: 16,258
- Game weather: 80 °F (27 °C), Sunny, Wind S 20 mph (32 km/h)
- Referee: Aaron Adams
- Television network: ESPN+
- Source: Box Score

Statistics	WOU	SDSU
First downs	13	21
Total yards	209	403
Rushing yards	102	209
Passing yards	107	194
Turnovers	3	0
Time of possession	30:05	29:55

Team	Category	Player	Statistics
Western Oregon	Passing	Gannon Winker	12/23, 67 yards, 3 INT
Western Oregon	Rushing	Jordan McCarty	8 carries, 37 yards, TD
Western Oregon	Receiving	Damon Hickok	3 receptions, 40 yards
South Dakota State	Passing	Mark Gronowski	8/10, 121 yards, TD
South Dakota State	Rushing	Amar Johnson	8 carries, 70 yards
South Dakota State	Receiving	Griffin Wilde	4 receptions, 79 yards, TD

=== No. 3 Montana State ===
No. 3 Montana State at No. 1 South Dakota State
Beef Bowl

Team	1	2	3	4	Total
No. 3 Bobcats	7	3	0	6	16
• No. 1 Jackrabbits	0	0	7	13	20

- Date: September 9
- Location:
  Dana J. Dykhouse Stadium
  Brookings, SD
- Game start: 6:05 p.m. CDT
- Elapsed time: 3:07
- Game attendance: 19,332
- Game weather: 70 °F (21 °C), Sunny, Wind NE 10 mph (16 km/h)
- Referee: Rick Warne
- Television network: ESPN+
- Source: Box Score

Statistics	MSU	SDSU
First downs	17	20
Total yards	298	341
Rushing yards	211	157
Passing yards	87	184
Turnovers	1	0
Time of possession	35:23	24:37

Team	Category	Player	Statistics
Montana State	Passing	Sean Chambers	3/9, 53 yards, INT
Montana State	Rushing	Sean Chambers	20 carries, 90 yards, TD
Montana State	Receiving	Derryk Snell	3 receptions, 38 yards
South Dakota State	Passing	Mark Gronowski	13/22, 184 yards, 2 TD
South Dakota State	Rushing	Isaiah Davis	12 carries, 66 yards
South Dakota State	Receiving	Griffin Wilde	2 receptions, 49 yards, TD

=== vs. Drake ===
No. 1 South Dakota State vs. Drake Bulldogs

Team	1	2	3	4	Total
• No. 1 Jackrabbits	14	21	21	14	70
Bulldogs	7	0	0	0	7

- Date: September 16
- Location:
  Target Field
  Minneapolis, MN
- Game start: 2:35 p.m. CDT
- Elapsed time: 3:07
- Game attendance: 18,174
- Game weather: 71 °F (22 °C), Cloudy, Wind NW 10 mph (16 km/h)
- Referee: Marcel Kerr
- Television network: ESPN+
- Source: Box Score

Statistics	SDSU	Drake
First downs	28	10
Total yards	618	267
Rushing yards	359	47
Passing yards	259	220
Turnovers	1	0
Time of possession	27:49	32:11

Team	Category	Player	Statistics
South Dakota State	Passing	Mark Gronowski	18/25, 226 yards, 5 TD, INT
South Dakota State	Rushing	Angel Johnson	4 carries, 90 yards, 2 TD
South Dakota State	Receiving	Jaxon Janke	7 receptions, 85 yards, TD
Drake	Passing	Luke Bailey	16/29, 201 yards, TD
Drake	Rushing	Luke Bailey	3 carries, 25 yards
Drake	Receiving	Colin Howard	3 receptions, 103 yards, TD

=== No. 12 North Dakota ===
No. 12 North Dakota at No. 1 South Dakota State
Precision Ag Bowl

Team	1	2	3	4	Total
No. 12 Fighting Hawks	0	7	0	14	21
• No. 1 Jackrabbits	14	7	7	14	42

- Date: September 30
- Location:
  Dana J. Dykhouse Stadium
  Brookings, SD
- Game start: 2:05 p.m. CDT
- Elapsed time: 3:05
- Game attendance: 19,231
- Game weather: 78 °F (26 °C), Sunny, Wind N 10 mph (16 km/h)
- Referee: Jason Berg
- Television network: ESPN+
- Source: Box Score

Statistics	UND	SDSU
First downs	17	26
Total yards	234	433
Rushing yards	68	266
Passing yards	166	167
Turnovers	0	0
Time of possession	29:39	30:21

Team	Category	Player	Statistics
North Dakota	Passing	Tommy Schuster	19/24, 118 yards, TD
North Dakota	Rushing	Gaven Ziebarth	5 carries, 22 yards
North Dakota	Receiving	Red Wilson	5 receptions, 45 yards
South Dakota State	Passing	Mark Gronowski	13/22, 167 yards, TD
South Dakota State	Rushing	Isaiah Davis	16 carries, 132 yards, 3 TD
South Dakota State	Receiving	Jaxon Janke	3 receptions, 51 yards, TD

=== at Illinois State ===
No. 1 South Dakota State at Illinois State

Team	1	2	3	4	Total
• No. 1 Jackrabbits	20	14	0	6	40
Redbirds	0	14	7	0	21

- Date: October 7
- Location:
  Hancock Stadium
  Normal, IL
- Game start: 6:05 p.m. CDT
- Elapsed time: 2:54
- Game attendance: 8,272
- Game weather: 56 °F (13 °C), Cloudy, Wind SW 9 mph (14 km/h)
- Referee: Gregory Gompf
- Television network: ESPN+
- Source: Box Score

Statistics	SDSU	ISU
First downs	25	18
Total yards	547	293
Rushing yards	374	122
Passing yards	173	171
Turnovers	1	2
Time of possession	35:45	24:15

Team	Category	Player	Statistics
South Dakota State	Passing	Mark Gronowski	11/17, 171 yards, 3 TD
South Dakota State	Rushing	Isaiah Davis	20 carries, 197 yards, 2 TD
South Dakota State	Receiving	Jaxon Janke	5 receptions, 88 yards, TD
Illinois State	Passing	Zack Annexstad	26/33, 162 yards, TD
Illinois State	Rushing	Mason Blakemore	6 carries, 57 yards, TD
Illinois State	Receiving	Daniel Sobkowicz	7 receptions, 70 yards, TD

=== Northern Iowa ===
Northern Iowa at No. 1 South Dakota State
Hobo Day

Team	1	2	3	4	Total
Panthers	0	3	0	3	6
• No. 1 Jackrabbits	14	10	14	3	41

- Date: October 14
- Location:
  Dana J. Dykhouse Stadium
  Brookings, SD
- Game start: 2:05 p.m. CDT
- Elapsed time: 2:58
- Game attendance: 19,357
- Game weather: 49 °F (9 °C), Cloudy, Wind N 15 mph (24 km/h)
- Referee: Jason Perkins
- Television network: ESPN+
- Source: Box Score

Statistics	UNI	SDSU
First downs	14	21
Total yards	264	460
Rushing yards	40	169
Passing yards	224	291
Turnovers	5	2
Time of possession	24:37	35:23

Team	Category	Player	Statistics
Northern Iowa	Passing	Theo Day	16/24, 210 yards, 2 INT
Northern Iowa	Rushing	Zach Brand	6 carries, 30 yards
Northern Iowa	Receiving	Sam Schnee	4 receptions, 104 yards
South Dakota State	Passing	Mark Gronowski	21/26, 291 yards, TD
South Dakota State	Rushing	Isaiah Davis	16 carries, 103 yards, TD
South Dakota State	Receiving	Zach Heins	4 receptions, 69 yards, 2 TD

=== at No. 12 Southern Illinois ===
No. 1 South Dakota State at No. 12 Southern Illinois

Team	1	2	3	4	Total
• No. 1 Jackrabbits	0	7	7	3	17
No. 12 Salukis	0	0	0	10	10

- Date: October 21
- Location:
  Saluki Stadium
  Carbondale, IL
- Game start: 2:02 p.m. CDT
- Elapsed time: 3:05
- Game attendance: 11,927
- Game weather: 67 °F (19 °C), Sunny, Wind E 13 mph (21 km/h)
- Referee: CJ Jackson
- Television network: ESPN+
- Source: Box Score

Statistics	SDSU	SIU
First downs	15	20
Total yards	308	308
Rushing yards	147	83
Passing yards	161	225
Turnovers	1	1
Time of possession	31:50	28:10

Team	Category	Player	Statistics
South Dakota State	Passing	Mark Gronowski	15/21, 161 yards, TD, INT
South Dakota State	Rushing	Isaiah Davis	15 carries, 91 yards, TD
South Dakota State	Receiving	Griffin Wilde	2 receptions, 61 yards, TD
Southern Illinois	Passing	Nic Baker	20/24, 225 yards, TD, INT
Southern Illinois	Rushing	Nic Baker	15 carries, 31 yards
Southern Illinois	Receiving	D'Ante' Cox	7 receptions, 88 yards, TD

=== at No. 4 South Dakota ===
No. 1 South Dakota State at No. 4 South Dakota

Team	1	2	3	4	Total
• No. 1 Jackrabbits	0	17	6	14	37
No. 4 Coyotes	3	0	0	0	3

- Date: October 28
- Location:
  DakotaDome
  Vermillion, SD
- Game start: 1:06 p.m. CDT
- Elapsed time: 2:49
- Game attendance: 9,458
- Game weather: 72 °F (22 °C), Indoor
- Referee: Gregory Gompf
- Television network: ESPN+
- Source: Box Score

Statistics	SDSU	USD
First downs	25	13
Total yards	473	183
Rushing yards	266	50
Passing yards	207	133
Turnovers	1	2
Time of possession	35:59	24:01

Team	Category	Player	Statistics
South Dakota State	Passing	Mark Gronowski	13/19, 207 yards, INT
South Dakota State	Rushing	Isaiah Davis	17 carries, 69 yards
South Dakota State	Receiving	Jaxon Janke	3 receptions, 93 yards
South Dakota	Passing	Aidan Bouman	17/31, 133 yards, 2 INT
South Dakota	Rushing	Travis Theis	9 carries, 29 yards
South Dakota	Receiving	JJ Galbreath	8 receptions, 65 yards

=== No. 11 North Dakota State ===
No. 11 North Dakota State at No. 1 South Dakota State
Dakota Marker

Team	1	2	3	4	Total
No. 11 Bison	6	3	0	7	16
• No. 1 Jackrabbits	7	13	7	6	33

- Date: November 4
- Location:
  Dana J. Dykhouse Stadium
  Brookings, SD
- Game start: 2:05 p.m. CDT
- Elapsed time: 3:18
- Game attendance: 19,431
- Game weather: 54 °F (12 °C), Sunny, Wind S 10 mph (16 km/h)
- Referee: Aaron Adams
- Television network: ESPN+
- Source: Box Score

Statistics	NDSU	SDSU
First downs	19	17
Total yards	325	365
Rushing yards	158	152
Passing yards	167	213
Turnovers	2	0
Time of possession	30:18	29:42

Team	Category	Player	Statistics
North Dakota State	Passing	Cam Miller	18/29, 167 yards, 2 TD, 2 INT
North Dakota State	Rushing	Cam Miller	17 carries, 93 yards
North Dakota State	Receiving	Eli Green	4 receptions, 47 yards
South Dakota State	Passing	Mark Gronowski	12/19, 213 yards, 2 TD
South Dakota State	Rushing	Isaiah Davis	17 carries, 106 yards, TD
South Dakota State	Receiving	Jadon Janke	5 receptions, 89 yards, 2 TD

=== at No. 22 Youngstown State ===
No. 1 South Dakota State at No. 22 Youngstown State

Team	1	2	3	4	Total
• No. 1 Jackrabbits	3	17	7	7	34
No. 22 Penguins	0	0	0	0	0

- Date: November 11
- Location:
  DakotaDome
  Vermillion, SD
- Game start: 12:02 p.m. CST
- Elapsed time: 3:03
- Game attendance: 9,303
- Game weather: 46 °F (8 °C), Sunny, Wind NW 5 mph (8.0 km/h)
- Referee: Rick Warne
- Television network: ESPN+
- Source: Box Score

Statistics	SDSU	YSU
First downs	22	16
Total yards	490	207
Rushing yards	166	47
Passing yards	324	160
Turnovers	0	1
Time of possession	33:31	26:29

Team	Category	Player	Statistics
South Dakota State	Passing	Mark Gronowski	19/28, 295 yards, 3 TD
South Dakota State	Rushing	Isaiah Davis	19 carries, 130 yards, TD
South Dakota State	Receiving	Jadon Janke	7 receptions, 166 yards, 2 TD
Youngstown State	Passing	Mitch Davidson	18/30, 160 yards, INT
Youngstown State	Rushing	Tyshon King	7 carries, 20 yards
Youngstown State	Receiving	Max Tomczak	5 receptions, 57 yards

=== Missouri State ===
Missouri State at No. 1 South Dakota State
Military Appreciation Day/Senior Day

Team	1	2	3	4	Total
Bears	3	0	7	7	17
• No. 1 Jackrabbits	14	7	7	7	35

- Date: November 18
- Location:
  Dana J. Dykhouse Stadium
  Brookings, SD
- Game start: 2:05 p.m. CST
- Elapsed time: 2:53
- Game attendance: 15,637
- Game weather: 59 °F (15 °C), Sunny, Wind W 10 mph (16 km/h)
- Referee: Marcel Kerr
- Television network: ESPN+
- Source: Box Score

Statistics	MSU	SDSU
First downs	15	29
Total yards	343	477
Rushing yards	82	154
Passing yards	261	323
Turnovers	0	0
Time of possession	26:05	33:55

Team	Category	Player	Statistics
Missouri State	Passing	Jordan Pachot	23/35, 261 yards, 2 TD
Missouri State	Rushing	Celdon Manning	3 carries, 41 yards
Missouri State	Receiving	Raylen Sharpe	8 receptions, 86 yards
South Dakota State	Passing	Mark Gronowski	16/23, 323 yards, 2 TD
South Dakota State	Rushing	Isaiah Davis	17 carries, 85 yards, TD
South Dakota State	Receiving	Jadon Janke	10 receptions, 187 yards, TD

=== No. 17 Mercer—NCAA Division I Second Round ===
No. 17 Mercer at No. 1 South Dakota State
NCAA Division I Second Round

Team	1	2	3	4	Total
No. 17 Bears	0	0	0	0	0
• No. 1 Jackrabbits	3	21	7	10	41

- Date: December 2
- Location:
  Dana J. Dykhouse Stadium
  Brookings, SD
- Game start: 1:02 p.m. CST
- Elapsed time: 2:39
- Game attendance: 10,171
- Game weather: 37 °F (3 °C), Sunny, Wind S 20 mph (32 km/h)
- Referee: Gary Leeper
- Television network: ESPN+
- Source: Box Score

Statistics	MER	SDSU
First downs	6	24
Total yards	151	571
Rushing yards	76	346
Passing yards	75	225
Turnovers	2	1
Time of possession	24:34	35:26

Team	Category	Player	Statistics
Mercer	Passing	Carter Peevy	14/22, 75 yards, 2 INT
Mercer	Rushing	Chris Hill	1 carry, 24 yards
Mercer	Receiving	Ty James	2 receptions, 28 yards
South Dakota State	Passing	Mark Gronowski	11/16, 158 yards, TD, INT
South Dakota State	Rushing	Isaiah Davis	16 carries, 117 yards, 3 TD
South Dakota State	Receiving	Jaxon Janke	7 receptions, 106 yards, TD

=== No. 6 Villanova—NCAA Division I Quarterfinal ===
No. 6 Villanova at No. 1 South Dakota State
NCAA Division I Quarterfinal

Team	1	2	3	4	Total
No. 6 Wildcats	0	9	0	3	12
• No. 1 Jackrabbits	3	7	7	6	23

- Date: December 9
- Location:
  Dana J. Dykhouse Stadium
  Brookings, SD
- Game start: 11:08 a.m. CST
- Elapsed time: 2:50
- Game attendance: 10,216
- Game weather: 29 °F (−2 °C), Cloudy, Wind NW 30 mph (48 km/h)
- Referee: Gregg Wilson
- Television network: ESPN
- Source: Box Score

Statistics	VIL	SDSU
First downs	10	16
Total yards	219	343
Rushing yards	145	242
Passing yards	74	101
Turnovers	1	1
Time of possession	28:33	31:27

Team	Category	Player	Statistics
Villanova	Passing	Connor Watkins	6/18, 74 yards, INT
Villanova	Rushing	Jalen Jackson	9 carry, 67 yards, TD
Villanova	Receiving	Rayjuon	2 receptions, 29 yards
South Dakota State	Passing	Mark Gronowski	11/19, 101 yards, TD
South Dakota State	Rushing	Isaiah Davis	27 carries, 192 yards, TD
South Dakota State	Receiving	Zach Heins	1 receptions, 26 yards

=== No. 5 Albany—NCAA Division I Semifinal ===
No. 5 Albany at No. 1 South Dakota State
NCAA Division I Semifinal

Team	1	2	3	4	Total
No. 5 Great Danes	0	0	0	0	0
• No. 1 Jackrabbits	14	21	7	17	59

- Date: December 15
- Location:
  Dana J. Dykhouse Stadium
  Brookings, SD
- Game start: 6:04 p.m. CST
- Elapsed time: 2:58
- Game attendance: 12,265
- Game weather: 39 °F (4 °C), Cloudy, Wind SE 5 mph (8.0 km/h)
- Referee: Kelly Holman
- Television network: ESPN2
- Source: Box Score

Statistics	ALB	SDSU
First downs	19	22
Total yards	298	556
Rushing yards	66	220
Passing yards	232	336
Turnovers	4	0
Time of possession	32:12	27:48

Team	Category	Player	Statistics
Albany	Passing	Reese Poffenbarger	30/44, 232 yards, 3 INT
Albany	Rushing	Reese Poffenbarger	9 carries, 29 yards
Albany	Receiving	Julian Hicks	7 receptions, 76 yards
South Dakota State	Passing	Mark Gronowski	15/19, 265 yards, 3 TD
South Dakota State	Rushing	Isaiah Davis	15 carries, 107 yards, 2 TD
South Dakota State	Receiving	Jadon Janke	6 receptions, 151 yards, TD

=== vs. No. 2 Montana—NCAA Division I Championship Game ===
No. 2 Montana vs. No. 1 South Dakota State
NCAA Division I Championship Game

Team	1	2	3	4	Total
No. 2 Grizzlies	0	3	0	0	3
• No. 1 Jackrabbits	7	0	16	0	23

- Date: January 7, 2024
- Location:
  Toyota Stadium
  Frisco, TX
- Game start: 1:00 pm CST
- Game attendance: 19,512
- Referee: Gary Leeper
- Television network: ABC

Statistics	MONT	SDSU
First downs	17	17
Total yards	259	363
Rushing yards	47	188
Passing yards	212	175
Turnovers	3	2
Time of possession	29:55	30:05

Team	Category	Player	Statistics
Montana	Passing	Clifton McDowell	22/39, 165 yards, INT
Montana	Rushing	Nick Ostmo	6 carries, 18 yards
Montana	Receiving	Aaron Fontes	7 receptions, 76 yards
South Dakota State	Passing	Mark Gronowski	13/21, 175 yards, TD, INT
South Dakota State	Rushing	Isaiah Davis	16 carries, 87 yards, TD
South Dakota State	Receiving	Jaxon Janke	4 receptions, 66 yards

== Roster ==
2023 South Dakota State Jackrabbits football team roster
Players
Coaches
Offense

Pos.	#	Name	Class
QB	13	Jack Amer	Fr
QB	17	Jeff Becker	Fr
QB	16	Jon Bell	So
QB	11	Mark Gronowski	Jr
QB	7	Chase Mason	So
RB	45	Brenden Begeman	Fr
RB	22	Isaiah Davis	Sr
RB	3	Amar Johnson	Jr
RB	21	Angel Johnson	So
RB	39	Isaac Kracl	Fr
RB	37	Kirby Vorhees	Fr
FB/TE	34	Michael Morgan	Sr
TE	83	David Alpers	Fr
TE	44	Kevin Brenner	Sr
TE	89	Brody Gormley	Fr
TE	88	Greyton Gannon	Fr
TE	87	Zach Heins	Sr
TE	81	Joey Neumann	Fr
TE	49	Davin Stoffel	Fr
OL	71	Noah Atherton	Fr
OL	66	Brady Beck	Sr
OL	61	Evan Beerntsen	Sr
OL	62	Kenyon Big Bow	Fr
OL	79	Jharett Bloomenrader	Sr
OL	70	Colby Christensen	Jr
OL	69	Quinten Christensen	Fr
OL	76	Bo Donald	Sr
OL	74	Garret Greenfield	Sr
OL	65	Cole Jarrett	Fr
OL	68	Jackson Kerstin	Fr
OL	54	Jalen Lee	Jr
OL	60	Mason McCormick	Sr
OL	50	Gus Miller	Jr
OL	67	Ian Mutchler	Fr
OL	78	John O'Brian	Sr
OL	77	William Paepke	Fr
OL	75	Dawson Rudd	Fr
OL	64	Ethan Vibert	Sr
WR	15	Devon Cole Jr.	Jr
WR	19	Elijah Ervin	Jr
WR	18	Grahm Goering	So
WR	86	Patrick Hoffmann	Jr
WR	1	Jadon Janke	Sr
WR	10	Jaxon Janke	Sr
WR	36	Dane Miller	Fr
WR	82	Ky Oday Jr.	Fr
WR	80	Kentrell Prejean	Fr
WR	2	Marcus Preston	Jr
WR	84	Joe Randle	Fr
WR	85	Joe Roll	Fr
WR	18	Griffin Wilde	Fr

Defense

Pos.	#	Name	Class
LB	32	Adam Bock	Sr
LB	9	Caleb Francl	Sr
LB	11	Jason Freeman	Sr
LB	47	Kytan Fyfe	Fr
LB	56	Andrew Gustad	Fr
LB	49	Bryce Johnson	Fr
LB	40	Aaron Kusler	Jr
LB	43	Adam Kusler	Jr
LB	0	Daeton Mcgaughy	Sr
LB	46	Cullen McShane	Fr
LB	41	Joe Ollman	Fr
LB	38	Trevor Scott	Fr
LB	29	Graham Spalding	Sr
LB	2	Isaiah Stalbird	Sr
LB	42	Davion Sterner	Jr
LB	28	Chase Van Tol	Fr
LB	6	Saiveon Williamson	Sr
DE	48	Quinton Hicks	Sr
DE	53	Caden Johnson	Sr
DE	90	Randy Keumogne	Sr
DE	97	Reis Kirschenman	Fr
DE	58	Aidan Murphy	Fr
DE	8	Blake Peterson	Sr
DE	99	Dawson Ripperda	Fr
DE	94	Cade Terveer	Sr
DE	57	Levi Vanden Bos	So
DE	50	Nick Wells	Fr
DE	95	Zac Wilson	Sr
DT	93	Max Baloun	Jr
DT	59	Grant Conaway	Jr
DT	52	Jarod DePriest	Sr
DT	51	Logan Green	Fr
DT	96	Bryce Hawthorne	Fr
DT	91	Jace Sifore	Fr
DT	98	Ryan Van Marel	Sr
DT	92	Brian Williams	Sr
DT	55	Aaron Wolfcale-Holsten	So
CB	26	Steven Arrell	Jr
CB	7	Dalys Beanum	Sr
CB	30	Cody Cotton	So
CB	13	Aydan Dautermann	So
CB	5	DyShawn Gales	Sr
CB	17	Abe Hoskins III	Jr
CB	31	Jalen B. Lee	Fr
CB	16	Noah St-Juste	Fr
CB	20	Myles Taylor	So
S	23	Matthew Durrance	So
S	35	Beau Giblin	Fr
S	14	Colby Huerter	Jr
S	3	Dontay Johnson	Fr
S	37	Tucker Large	So
S	25	Cale Reeder	Sr
S	27	Noah Thompson	Fr
S	26	Kolten Tilford	Fr

Special teams

Pos.	#	Name	Class
PK/P	10	Hunter Dustman	Sr
PK/P	96	Jackson Isakson	Fr
LS	37	Kaydon Olivia	So

Head coach

- Jimmy Rogers (1st year)

Coordinators/assistant coaches

- Zach Lujan – Offensive coordinator/quarterbacks
- Jesse Bobbit – Defensive coordinator/linebackers
- Ryan Olson – Run game coordinator/offensive line
- Pat Cashmore – Special teams coordinator
- Chris Meyers – Recruiting coordinator/tight ends
- Mike Banks – Cornerbacks
- Jalon Bibbs – Defensive line
- Jake Menage – Wide receivers
- Pete Menage – Safeties
- Robbie Rouse – Running backs
- Jonathan Shaeffer – Director of Football Operations
- Matt Jacobs – Director of strength & conditioning
- Kyle Saddler – Offensive quality control
- Kellen Soulek – Defensive quality control
- Chuck Case – Offensive quality control
- Evan Traxler – Defensive quality control
- Brayden Gage – Special teams quality control/video coordinator

Legend

- (C) Team captain
- (S) Suspended
- (I) Ineligible
- Injured
- Redshirt

Roster
