= 2023 South Dakota Coyotes football team =

American college football season

2023 South Dakota Coyotes football

NCAA Division I Quarterfinal, L 17–45 vs. North Dakota State
- Conference: Missouri Valley Football Conference

Ranking
- STATS: No. 3
- FCS Coaches: No. 3
- Record: 10–3 (7–1 MVFC)
- Head coach: Bob Nielson (8th season)
- Offensive coordinator: Josh Davis (1st season)
- Offensive scheme: Pistol
- Defensive coordinator: Travis Johansen (5th season)
- Base defense: Multiple
- Home stadium: DakotaDome

2023 Missouri Valley Football Conference standings
| | Conf. | | | Overall |
| Team | W | | L | W | | L |
|---|---|---|---|---|---|---|
| No. 1 South Dakota State $^ | 8 | – | 0 | 15 | – | 0 |
| No. 4 South Dakota ^ | 7 | – | 1 | 10 | – | 3 |
| No. 3 North Dakota State ^ | 5 | – | 3 | 11 | – | 4 |
| No. 19 Youngstown State ^ | 5 | – | 3 | 8 | – | 5 |
| No. 16 North Dakota ^ | 5 | – | 3 | 7 | – | 5 |
| Northern Iowa | 5 | – | 3 | 6 | – | 5 |
| No. 12 Southern Illinois ^ | 4 | – | 4 | 8 | – | 5 |
| Illinois State | 4 | – | 4 | 6 | – | 5 |
| Missouri State | 3 | – | 5 | 4 | – | 7 |
| Murray State | 1 | – | 7 | 2 | – | 9 |
| Indiana State | 1 | – | 7 | 1 | – | 10 |
| Western Illinois | 0 | – | 8 | 0 | – | 11 |
$ – Conference champion; ^ – FCS playoff participant; Rankings from STATS Poll

The 2023 South Dakota Coyotes football team represented the University of South Dakota in the 2023 NCAA Division I FCS football season. The Coyotes competed as members of the Missouri Valley Football Conference and were led by eighth-year head coach Bob Nielson. They played home games at the DakotaDome in Vermillion, South Dakota.

== Schedule ==
| Date | Time | Opponent | Rank | Site | TV | Result | Attendance |
|---|---|---|---|---|---|---|---|
| August 31 | 7:00 p.m. | at Missouri* | | Faurot Field; Columbia, MO (SEC Nation) | SECN | L 10–35 | 50,434 |
| September 9 | 1:00 p.m. | St. Thomas* | | DakotaDome; Vermillion, SD | MidcoSN | W 24–0 | 6,126 |
| September 16 | 1:00 p.m. | Lamar* | | DakotaDome; Vermillion, SD | ESPN+ | W 35–6 | 5,618 |
| September 30 | 1:00 p.m. | at No. 2 North Dakota State | | Fargodome; Fargo, ND | ESPN+/ABC ND | W 24–19 | 18,342 |
| October 7 | 2:00 p.m. | Murray State | No. 15 | DakotaDome; Vermillion, SD | ESPN+ | W 38–7 | 7,907 |
| October 14 | 1:00 p.m. | No. 23 Youngstown State | No. 10 | DakotaDome; Vermillion, SD | ESPN+ | W 34–31 | 3,608 |
| October 21 | 12:00 p.m. | at Indiana State | No. 6 | Memorial Stadium; Terre Haute, IN | ESPN+ | W 17–3 | 4,908 |
| October 28 | 1:00 p.m. | No. 1 South Dakota State | No. 4 | DakotaDome; Vermillion, SD (South Dakota Showdown) | ESPN+ | L 3–37 | 9,458 |
| November 4 | 1:00 p.m. | at No. 10 Southern Illinois | No. 9 | Saluki Stadium; Carbondale, IL | ESPN+ | W 14–7 | 7,106 |
| November 11 | 12:00 p.m. | No. 10 North Dakota | No. 6 | DakotaDome; Vermillion, SD | MidcoSN | W 14–10 | 6,834 |
| November 18 | 1:00 p.m. | at Western Illinois | No. 5 | Hanson Field; Macomb, IL | ESPN+ | W 48–6 | 1,935 |
| December 2 | 1:00 p.m. | No. 15 Sacramento State* | No. 3 | DakotaDome; Vermillion, SD (NCAA Division I Second Round) | ESPN+ | W 34–24 | 6,288 |
| December 9 | 1:30 p.m. | No. 8 North Dakota State* | No. 3 | DakotaDome; Vermillion, SD (NCAA Division I Quarterfinal) | ABC | L 17–45 | 9,141 |
*Non-conference game; Rankings from STATS Poll released prior to the game; All times are in Central time

== Game summaries ==
=== at Missouri (FBS) ===
Uniform Combination
| Helmet | Jersey | Pants |

Game One – South Dakota Coyotes (0–0) at Missouri Tigers (FBS) (0–0) – Game summary

| Quarter | 1 | 2 | 3 | 4 | Total |
|---|---|---|---|---|---|
| South Dakota | 0 | 3 | 0 | 7 | 10 |
| Missouri (FBS) | 14 | 14 | 0 | 7 | 35 |

at Faurot Field • Columbia, Missouri

- Date: Thursday, August 31, 2023
- Game time: 7:00 p.m. CDT
- Game weather: Sunny • Temperature: 75 °F (24 °C)
- Game attendance: 50,434
- TV announcers (SECN): Clay Matvick (play-by-play), Aaron Murray (color analyst), and Ashley ShahAhmadi (sideline reporter)

Game information

First quarter

- (7:47) MIZZ – Mekhi Miller 18-yard pass from Brady Cook (Harrison Mevis kick) (Drive: 6 plays, 52 yards, 2:29; Missouri 7–0)
- (3:19) MIZZ – Nathaniel Peat 1-yard run (Harrison Mevis kick) (Drive: 7 plays, 38 yards, 2:53; Missouri 14–0)

Second quarter

- (7:06) USD – Will Leyland 40-yard field goal (Drive: 12 plays, 47 yards, 6:45; Missouri 14–3)
- (1:48) MIZZ – Cody Schrader 2-yard run (Harrison Mevis kick) (Drive: 14 plays, 81 yards, 5:11; Missouri 21–3)
- (0:33) MIZZ – Brady Cook 15-yard run (Harrison Mevis kick) (Drive: 6 plays, 83 yards, 0:52; Missouri 28–3)

Third quarter

No scoring plays

Fourth quarter

- (12:14) USD – Mike Mansaray 6-yard pass from Aidan Bouman (Jack Martens kick) (Drive: 3 plays, 29 yards, 1:08; Missouri 28–10)
- (1:42) MIZZ – Luther Burden III 15-yard pass from Sam Horn (Harrison Mevis kick) (Drive: 9 plays, 78 yards, 4:47; Missouri 35–10)

| Statistics | USD | MIZZ |
|---|---|---|
| First downs | 14 | 22 |
| Total yards | 60–194 | 66–437 |
| Rushes/yards | 35–38 | 40–211 |
| Passing yards | 156 | 266 |
| Passing: Comp–Att–Int | 15–25–0 | 20–26–1 |
| Time of possession | 30:58 | 29:02 |

| Team | Category | Player | Statistics |
|---|---|---|---|
| South Dakota | Passing | Aiden Bouman | 15–25, 156 yards, 1 TD |
| South Dakota | Rushing | Travis Theis | 7 carries, 26 yards |
| South Dakota | Receiving | Jack Martens | 8 receptions, 88 yards |
| Missouri | Passing | Brady Cook | 17–21, 172 yards, 1 TD |
| Missouri | Rushing | Cody Schrader | 18 carries, 138 yards, 1 TD |
| Missouri | Receiving | Luther Burden III | 7 receptions, 96 yards, 1 TD |

=== Lamar ===
Game Three – Lamar Cardinals at South Dakota Coyotes

| Quarter | 1 | 2 | 3 | 4 | Total |
|---|---|---|---|---|---|
| Lamar | 3 | 3 | 0 | 0 | 6 |
| South Dakota | 0 | 7 | 14 | 14 | 35 |

at DakotaDome, Vermillion, SD

- Date: September 16
- Game time: 1:00 p.m.
- Game weather: Weather: Indoor • Temp: 72
- Game attendance: 5,618
- Referee: Aaron Adams
- TV: ESPN+
- Box Score

Game information

First Quarter

- LU – 4:53 Esqueda, Chris 26 yd field goal LU 3–0 Drive: 7 plays, 12 yards, TOP 03:25

Second Quarter

- LU – 10:06 Esqueda, Chris 26 yd field goal LU 6–0 Drive: 13 plays, 75 yards, TOP 06:45
- USD – 02:14 Theis, Travis 2 yd run (Leyland, Will kick) USD 6–7 Drive: 13 plays, 75 yards, TOP 07:52

Third Quarter

- USD – 9:27 Thomas, Nate 1 yd run (Leyland, Will kick), USD 6–14 Drive: 9 plays, 73 yards, TOP 05:27
- USD – 4:12 Galbreath, JJ 20 yd pass from Bouman, Aidan (Leyland, Will kick) USD 6–21 Drive: 5 plays, 65 yards, TOP 02:35

Fourth Quarter

- USD – 10:47 Theis, Travis 32 yd run (Leyland, Will kick) USD 6–28 Drive: 7 plays, 80 yards, TOP 03:50
- USD – 3:23 Homas, Nate 2 yd run (Mata, Zeke kick) USD 6–35 Drive: 6 plays, 50 yards, TOP 04:09

Statistics

| Statistics | Lamar | South Dakota |
|---|---|---|
| First downs | 22 | 22 |
| Total yards | 274 | 401 |
| Rushing yards | 105 | 305 |
| Passing yards | 169 | 96 |
| Turnovers | 2 | 2 |
| Time of possession | 31:41 | 28:19 |

| Team | Category | Player | Statistics |
|---|---|---|---|
| Lamar | Passing | Robert Coleman | 14/24; 144 yds; 1 Int; long 25 yds; sack 7 |
| Lamar | Rushing | Khalan Griffin | 15 attempts; 63 yds; long 10 |
| Lamar | Receiving | Kyndon Fuselier | 4 receptions; 37 yds; long 12 |
| South Dakota | Passing | Aidan Bouman | 7/9; 96 yds; 1 Int; 1 TD; long 29 yds |
| South Dakota | Rushing | Nate Thomas | 19 attempts; 164 yds; long 29; 2 TDs |
| South Dakota | Receiving | Jack Martens | 2 receptions; 34 yds; long 29 |

=== at No. 2 North Dakota State ===
South Dakota Coyotes (2–1) vs No. 2 North Dakota State Bison (3–0)

| Quarter | 1 | 2 | 3 | 4 | Total |
|---|---|---|---|---|---|
| Coyotes | 7 | 14 | 0 | 3 | 24 |
| No. 2 Bison | 3 | 0 | 7 | 9 | 19 |

at Fargodome, Fargo, ND

- Date: September 30, 2023
- Game time: 1:00 p.m. (CT)
- Game weather: Indoors; 70 °F (21 °C)
- Game attendance: 18,342
- Referee: Marcel Kerr
- TV: ESPN+

| Statistics | South Dakota | North Dakota State |
|---|---|---|
| First downs | 15 | 23 |
| Plays–yards | 38–269 | 65–348 |
| Rushes–yards | 26–101 | 40–194 |
| Passing yards | 168 | 154 |
| Passing: comp–att–int | 10–12–0 | 18–25–1 |
| Time of possession | 24:28 | 35:32 |

| Team | Category | Player | Statistics |
|---|---|---|---|
| South Dakota | Passing | Aidan Bouman | 10/12, 168 yds, 2 TD |
| South Dakota | Rushing | Nate Thomas | 14 car, 49 yds |
| South Dakota | Receiving | Carter Bell | 5 rec, 124 yds, 2 TD |
| North Dakota State | Passing | Cam Miller | 18/25, 154 yds, TD, INT |
| North Dakota State | Rushing | Cam Miller | 12 car, 70 yds |
| North Dakota State | Receiving | Zach Mathis | 4 rec, 42 yds |

Scoring summary

| Quarter | Time | Drive | | | Team | Scoring information | Score | |
| Quarter | Time | Plays | Yards | TOP | Team | Scoring information | USD | NDSU |
|---|---|---|---|---|---|---|---|---|
| 1st | 11:23 | 6 | 75 | 3:37 | USD | Carter Bell (#14) 50-yard touchdown reception from Aidan Bouman (#2), Will Leyland (#15) kick good | 7 | 0 |
| 1st | 1:16 | 16 | 56 | 10:07 | NDSU | 37-yard field goal by Griffin Crosa (#39) | 7 | 3 |
| 2nd | 9:47 | 11 | 78 | 6:23 | USD | Keyondre Jones (#21) 8-yard touchdown run, Will Leyland (#15) kick good | 14 | 3 |
| 2nd | 5:30 | 2 | 46 | 1:11 | USD | Carter Bell (#14) 52-yard touchdown reception from Aidan Bouman (#2), Will Leyland (#15) kick good | 21 | 3 |
| 3rd | 7:23 | 12 | 89 | 7:31 | NDSU | Cam Miller (#7) 7-yard touchdown run, Griffin Crosa (#39) kick good | 21 | 10 |
| 4th | 11:10 | 16 | 80 | 9:24 | NDSU | 26-yard field goal by Griffin Crosa (#39) | 21 | 13 |
| 4th | 2:49 | 12 | 54 | 8:14 | USD | 37-yard field goal by Will Leyland (#15) | 24 | 13 |
| 4th | 0:36 | 12 | 75 | 2:13 | NDSU | Joe Stoffel (#82) 2-yard touchdown reception from Cam Miller (#7), 2-point pass failed | 24 | 19 |
| "TOP" = time of possession. For other American football terms, see Glossary of American football. | | | | | | | 24 | 19 |

=== No. 1 South Dakota State ===
No. 1 South Dakota State at No. 4 South Dakota

| Team | 1 | 2 | 3 | 4 | Total |
|---|---|---|---|---|---|
| • No. 1 Jackrabbits | 0 | 17 | 6 | 14 | 37 |
| No. 4 Coyotes | 3 | 0 | 0 | 0 | 3 |

- Date: October 28
- Location:
  DakotaDome
  Vermillion, SD
- Game start: 1:06 p.m. CDT
- Elapsed time: 2:49
- Game attendance: 9,458
- Game weather: 72 °F (22 °C), Indoor
- Referee: Gregory Gompf
- Television network: ESPN+
- Source: Box Score

| Statistics | SDSU | USD |
|---|---|---|
| First downs | 25 | 13 |
| Total yards | 473 | 183 |
| Rushing yards | 266 | 50 |
| Passing yards | 207 | 133 |
| Turnovers | 1 | 2 |
| Time of possession | 35:59 | 24:01 |

| Team | Category | Player | Statistics |
|---|---|---|---|
| South Dakota State | Passing | Mark Gronowski | 13/19, 207 yards, INT |
| South Dakota State | Rushing | Isaiah Davis | 17 carries, 69 yards |
| South Dakota State | Receiving | Jaxon Janke | 3 receptions, 93 yards |
| South Dakota | Passing | Aidan Bouman | 17/31, 133 yards, 2 INT |
| South Dakota | Rushing | Travis Theis | 9 carries, 29 yards |
| South Dakota | Receiving | JJ Galbreath | 8 receptions, 65 yards |

== FCS Playoffs ==
=== No. 15 Sacramento State – Second Round ===
FCS Playoffs Second Round: No. 15 Sacramento State Hornets (8–4) at No. 3 South Dakota Coyotes (9–2) – Game summary

| Quarter | 1 | 2 | 3 | 4 | Total |
|---|---|---|---|---|---|
| No. 15 Hornets | 0 | 14 | 0 | 10 | 24 |
| No. 3 Coyotes | 3 | 21 | 7 | 3 | 34 |

at DakotaDome, Vermillion, SD

- Date: December 2, 2023
- Game time: 11:00 a.m. PST
- Game weather: 72 °F (22 °C) • Indoors
- Game attendance: 6,288
- Referee: Tim Barker
- TV announcers (ESPN+): Play-by-Play: Jack Benjamin • Analysis: Craig Haubert

Game information

First Quarter

- (0:59) USD – Will Leyland 37-yard field goal (Drive: 14 plays, 70 yards, 8:12; South Dakota 3–0)

Second Quarter

- (14:55) USD – Javion Phelps 18-yard pass from Aidan Bouman (Will Leyland kick) (Drive: 4 plays, 33 yards, 0:54; South Dakota 10–0)
- (14:17) USD – Mi'Quise Grace 56-yard fumble return (Will Leyland kick) (Drive: 2 plays, 31 yards, 0:38; South Dakota 17–0)
- (9:31) SAC – Marcus Fulcher 2-yard run (Zach Schreiner kick) (Drive: 10 plays, 75 yards, 4:46; South Dakota 17–7)
- (8:38) USD – JJ Galbreath 75-yard pass from Aidan Bouman (Will Leyland kick) (Drive: 2 plays, 75 yards, 0:53; South Dakota 24–7)
- (0:14) SAC – Marcus Fulcher 2-yard run (Zach Schreiner kick) (Drive: 8 plays, 59 yards, 3:46; South Dakota 24–14)

Third Quarter

- (0:20) USD – Travis Theis 3-yard run (Will Leyland kick) (Drive: 10 plays, 63 yards, 5:14; South Dakota 31–14)

Fourth Quarter

- (11:54) SAC – Zach Schreiner 28-yard field goal (Drive: 8 plays, 65 yards, 3:26; South Dakota 31–17)
- (5:06) USD – Will Leyland 34-yard field goal (Drive: 7 plays, 73 yards, 3:42; South Dakota 34–17)
- (1:37) SAC – Jared Gipson 3-yard pass from Carson Camp (Zach Schreiner kick) (Drive: 10 plays, 56 yards, 3:19; South Dakota 34–24)

Line

- USD –4.0

Over/Under

- 50.5

| Statistics | SAC | USD |
|---|---|---|
| First downs | 18 | 15 |
| Total yards | 350 | 368 |
| Rushing yards | 148 | 194 |
| Passing yards | 202 | 174 |
| Passing: Comp–Att–Int | 17–30–1 | 11–17–0 |
| Time of possession | 27:13 | 32:47 |

| Team | Category | Player | Statistics |
|---|---|---|---|
| Sacramento State | Passing | Carson Camp | 14/23, 168 yards, TD |
| Sacramento State | Rushing | Marcus Fulcher | 13 carries, 67 yards, 2 TD |
| Sacramento State | Receiving | Anderson Grover | 3 receptions, 79 yards |
| South Dakota | Passing | Aidan Bouman | 11/16, 174 yards, 2 TD |
| South Dakota | Rushing | Charles Pierre Jr. | 13 carries, 123 yards |
| South Dakota | Receiving | JJ Galbreath | 1 reception, 75 yards, TD |

=== No. 8 North Dakota State – Quarterfinal ===
No. 8 North Dakota State Bison (10–3) vs. No. 3 (3) South Dakota Coyotes (10–2)

| Quarter | 1 | 2 | 3 | 4 | Total |
|---|---|---|---|---|---|
| No. 8 Bison | 21 | 14 | 3 | 7 | 45 |
| No. 3 (3) Coyotes | 3 | 0 | 7 | 7 | 17 |

at DakotaDome, Vermillion, SD

- Date: December 9, 2023
- Game time: 1:30 p.m. (CT)
- Game weather: Indoors; 70 °F (21 °C)
- Game attendance: 9,141
- Referee: Gary Leeper
- TV announcers (ABC): Roy Philpott, Roddy Jones, Lauren Sisler

| Statistics | North Dakota State | South Dakota |
|---|---|---|
| First downs | 22 | 16 |
| Plays–yards | 60–416 | 52–298 |
| Rushes–yards | 45–206 | 20–52 |
| Passing yards | 210 | 246 |
| Passing: comp–att–int | 13–15–0 | 18–32–3 |
| Time of possession | 36:08 | 23:52 |

| Team | Category | Player | Statistics |
|---|---|---|---|
| North Dakota State | Passing | Cam Miller | 13/15, 210 yds, TD |
| North Dakota State | Rushing | Cole Payton | 6 car, 65 yds, 2 TD |
| North Dakota State | Receiving | Eli Green | 5 rec, 116 yds |
| South Dakota | Passing | Aidan Bouman | 13/22, 199 yds, TD, 2 INT |
| South Dakota | Rushing | Travis Theis | 6 car, 32 yds |
| South Dakota | Receiving | Javion Phelps | 3 rec, 81 yds, TD |

Scoring summary

| Quarter | Time | Drive | | | Team | Scoring information | Score | |
| Quarter | Time | Plays | Yards | TOP | Team | Scoring information | NDSU | USD |
|---|---|---|---|---|---|---|---|---|
| 1st | 8:30 | 10 | 75 | 6:30 | NDSU | Cam Miller (#7) 9-yard touchdown run, Griffin Crosa (#39) kick good | 7 | 0 |
| 1st | 5:32 | 8 | 60 | 2:58 | USD | 32-yard field goal by Will Leyland (#15) | 7 | 3 |
| 1st | 1:57 | 7 | 76 | 3:30 | NDSU | Cole Payton (#9) 43-yard touchdown run, Griffin Crosa (#39) kick good | 14 | 3 |
| 1st | 0:05 | | | | NDSU | Punt returned 82 yards for touchdown by Jayden Price (#23), Griffin Crosa (#39) kick good | 21 | 3 |
| 2nd | 6:59 | 9 | 81 | 5:27 | NDSU | Joe Stoffel (#82) 4-yard touchdown reception from Cam Miller (#7), Griffin Crosa (#39) kick good | 28 | 3 |
| 2nd | 0:23 | 7 | 54 | 3:35 | NDSU | Cole Payton (#9) 17-yard touchdown run, Griffin Crosa (#39) kick good | 35 | 3 |
| 3rd | 10:07 | 9 | 75 | 4:53 | USD | Javion Phelps (#8) 16-yard touchdown reception from Aidan Bouman (#2), Will Leyland (#15) kick good | 35 | 10 |
| 3rd | 0:50 | 53 | 15 | 9:17 | NDSU | 40-yard field goal by Griffin Crosa (#39) | 38 | 10 |
| 4th | 9:12 | 7 | 45 | 4:40 | NDSU | TaMerik Williams (#22) 19-yard touchdown run, Griffin Crosa (#39) kick good | 45 | 10 |
| 4th | 2:58 | 14 | 74 | 6:09 | USD | Charles Pierre Jr. (#3) 5-yard touchdown run, Will Leyland (#15) kick good | 45 | 17 |
| "TOP" = time of possession. For other American football terms, see Glossary of American football. | | | | | | | 45 | 17 |

== Coaching staff ==
South Dakota Coyotes
| Name | Position | Consecutive season at South Dakota in current position | Previous position | USD profile |
| Bob Nielson | Head coach | 8th | Western Illinois head coach (2013–2015) | |
| Travis Johansen | Associate head coach and defensive coordinator | 5th | Grand View defensive coordinator (2013–2018) | |
| Josh Davis | Offensive coordinator | 1st | South Dakota State pass game coordinator and wide receivers coach (2022) | |
| Dante Warren | Running backs coach | 6th | Augustana (IL) graduate assistant (2016–2017) | |
| Miles Taylor | Defensive pass game coordinator and defensive backs coach | 4th | Iowa graduate assistant (2018–2019) | |
| Elijah Hodge | Inside linebackers coach | 2nd | N/A | |
| Jeff Nady | Offensive line coach | 1st | Nevada offensive line coach (2022) | |
| Craig Bagnell | Wide receivers coach | 1st | Mary head coach (2018–2022) | |
| Rob Snyder | Defensive line coach | 1st | Jesuit HS (LA) defensive coordinator and defensive line coach (2022) | |
| Tim Morrison | Tight ends coach | 1st | Upper Iowa assistant head coach and offensive coordinator (2021–2022) | |
| Steve Ferentz | Outside linebackers coach | 2nd | Miami Dolphins assistant linebackers coach (2020–2021) | |
