= 2023 Missouri State Bears football team =

American college football season

2023 Missouri State Bears football
- Conference: Missouri Valley Football Conference
- Record: 4–7 (3–5 MVFC)
- Head coach: Ryan Beard (1st season)
- Offensive coordinator: Nick Petrino (4th season)
- Offensive scheme: Multiple
- Defensive coordinator: L. D. Scott (1st season)
- Base defense: 4–2–5
- Captains: Grant Burkett; PJ Hall; Raylen Sharpe; Darion Smith; Jacardia Wright
- Home stadium: Robert W. Plaster Stadium

2023 Missouri Valley Football Conference standings
	Conf.			Overall
Team	W		L	W		L
No. 1 South Dakota State $^	8	–	0	15	–	0
No. 4 South Dakota ^	7	–	1	10	–	3
No. 3 North Dakota State ^	5	–	3	11	–	4
No. 19 Youngstown State ^	5	–	3	8	–	5
No. 16 North Dakota ^	5	–	3	7	–	5
Northern Iowa	5	–	3	6	–	5
No. 12 Southern Illinois ^	4	–	4	8	–	5
Illinois State	4	–	4	6	–	5
Missouri State	3	–	5	4	–	7
Murray State	1	–	7	2	–	9
Indiana State	1	–	7	1	–	10
Western Illinois	0	–	8	0	–	11
$ – Conference champion; ^ – FCS playoff participant; Rankings from STATS Poll

The 2023 Missouri State Bears football team represented Missouri State University as a member of the Missouri Valley Football Conference (MVFC) during the 2023 NCAA Division I FCS football season. Led by first-year head coach Ryan Beard, the Bears compiled an overall record of 4–7 with a mark of 3–5 in conference play, placing ninth in the MVFC. Missouri State played home games at Robert W. Plaster Stadium in Springfield, Missouri.

== Schedule ==
Date	Time	Opponent	Site	TV	Result	Attendance
September 1	7:00 p.m.	at Kansas*	David Booth Kansas Memorial Stadium; Lawrence, KS	ESPN+	L 17–48	41,091
September 9	6:00 p.m.	at UT Martin*	Graham Stadium; Martin, TN	ESPN+	L 31–38	6,104
September 23	2:00 p.m.	Utah Tech*	Robert W. Plaster Stadium; Springfield, MO	ESPN+	W 59–14	11,002
September 30	4:00 p.m.	at No. 10 Southern Illinois	Saluki Stadium; Carbondale, IL	ESPN+	L 20–33	10,359
October 7	2:00 p.m.	No. 7 North Dakota State	Robert W. Plaster Stadium; Springfield, MO	ESPN+	L 10–38	8,727
October 14	3:00 p.m.	at Western Illinois	Hanson Field; Macomb, IL	ESPN+	W 48–7	2,809
October 21	2:00 p.m.	Murray State^{†}	Robert W. Plaster Stadium; Springfield, MO	ESPN+	W 28–24	11,386
October 28	1:00 p.m.	No. 24 Youngstown State	Stambaugh Stadium; Youngstown, OH	ESPN+	L 28–44	9,880
November 4	2:00 p.m.	Illinois State	Robert W. Plaster Stadium; Springfield, MO	ESPN+	L 35–36	7,700
November 11	2:00 p.m.	No. 15 Northern Iowa	Robert W. Plaster Stadium; Springfield, MO	ESPN+	W 35–16	6,898
November 18	2:00 p.m.	at No. 1 South Dakota State	Dana J. Dykhouse Stadium; Brookings, SD	ESPN+	L 17–35	15,637
*Non-conference game; ^{†}Homecoming; Rankings from STATS Poll released prior to the game; All times are in Central time

== Preseason ==
=== MVFC media poll ===
The media picked the Bears to finish in eighth place.

=== Preseason awards ===
Missouri State had six players selected to the 2023 All-MVFC Preseason Team. Two from the defense, two from the offense, and two from the specialists. Two players were picked to the first team and four to the second team.

Preseason All-MVFC Team

Preseason All-MVFC Team
Player	Team	Position	Year
Grant Burkett	First Team	P	JR
Caden Bolz	First Team	LS	JR
Jacardia Wright	Second Team	RB	JR
PJ Hall	Second Team	DB	JR
Stetson Moore	Honorable Mention	TE	SR
Von Young	Honorable Mention	LB	JR

== Game summaries ==
=== at Kansas ===
Missouri State Bears at Kansas Jayhawks

Quarter	1	2	3	4	Total
Bears	7	3	0	7	17
Jayhawks	7	10	10	21	48

at David Booth Kansas Memorial Stadium • Lawrence, Kansas

- Date: Friday, September 1, 2023
- Game time: 7:00 pm CDT
- Game weather: Sunny • Temperature: 89 °F (32 °C)
- Game attendance: 41,091
- Referee: Henry Johns
- TV announcers (ESPN+): Chuckie Kempf, Ahman Green

Game information

First quarter

- 11:26 KU Devin Neal 48 yard run (Seth Keller kick good), 4–70, 1:49 KU 7–0
- 2:24 MSU Jmariyae Robinson 2 yard pass from Jacob Clark (Owen Rozanc kick good), 10–46, 5:37 7–7

Second quarter

- 12:12 MSU Owen Rozanc 37 yard field goal, 7–53, 3:10 MSU 10–7
- 11:03 KU Luke Grimm 14 yard pass from Jason Bean (Seth Keller kick good), 3–75, 1:11 KU 14–10
- 1:05 KU Seth Keller 28 yard field goal, 10–75, 1:02 KU 17–10

Third quarter

- 10:29 KU Dylan McDuffie 17 yard run (Seth Keller kick good), 9–69, 4:22 KU 24–10
- 3:18 KU Seth Keller 35 yard field goal, 10–55, 5:07 KU 27–10

Fourth quarter

- 14:57 MSU Jmariyae Robinson 5 yard run (Owen Rozanc kick good), 6–75, 3:21 KU 27–17
- 10:18 KU Daniel Hishaw Jr. 24 yard run (Seth Keller kick good), 8–75, 4:39 KU 34–17
- 7:49 KU Devin Neal 6 yard pass from Jason Bean (Owen Piepergerdes kick good), 5–28, 2:21 KU 41–17
- 4:57 KU Sevion Morrison 5 yard Run (Seth Keller kick), 4–23, 2:14 KU 48–17

Statistics	MSU	KU
First downs	10	27
Plays–yards	48–217	66–521
Rushes–yards	27–74	38–245
Passing yards	143	276
Passing: comp–att–int	14–21–2	22–28–0
Turnovers		
Time of possession	26:13	33:47

Team	Category	Player	Statistics
Missouri State	Passing	Jacob Clark	14/21 143 yards 1 TD 2 INTa
Missouri State	Rushing	Jacob Clark	8 carries 36 yards
Missouri State	Receiving	Celdon Manning	2 receptions 31 yards
Kansas	Passing	Jason Bean	22/28 276 yards 2 TDs
Kansas	Rushing	Devin Neal	13 carries 94 yards 1 TD
Kansas	Receiving	Lawrence Arnold; Quentin Skinner	4 receptions 77 yards

=== No. 7 North Dakota State ===
No. 7 North Dakota State Bison (3–1) vs. Missouri State Bears (1–3)

Quarter	1	2	3	4	Total
No. 7 Bison	14	14	3	7	38
Bears	7	0	3	0	10

at Robert W. Plaster Stadium, Springfield, MO

- Date: October 7, 2023
- Game time: 2:00 p.m. (CT)
- Game weather: Sunny; 60 °F (16 °C); Wind: NW 8 mph
- Game attendance: 8,727
- Referee: Jason Berg
- TV: ESPN+

Statistics	North Dakota State	Missouri State
First downs	23	21
Plays–yards	64–534	64–351
Rushes–yards	40–258	20–82
Passing yards	276	269
Passing: comp–att–int	18–24–0	25–44–3
Turnovers		
Time of possession	33:28	26:32

Team	Category	Player	Statistics
North Dakota State	Passing	Cam Miller	16/20, 256 yds, 2 TD
North Dakota State	Rushing	Owen Johnson	9 car, 82 yds
North Dakota State	Receiving	Zach Mathis	6 rec, 160 yds, 2 TD
Missouri State	Passing	Jordan Pachot	25/44, 269 yds, TD, 3 INT
Missouri State	Rushing	Jacardia Wright	15 car, 65 yds
Missouri State	Receiving	Raylen Sharpe	13 rec, 153 yds, TD

Scoring summary

Quarter	Time	Drive			Team	Scoring information	Score	
Quarter	Time	Plays	Yards	TOP	Team	Scoring information	NDSU	MOST
1st	9:31	9	73	5:21	NDSU	Zach Mathis (#0) 23-yard touchdown reception from Cam Miller (#7), Griffin Crosa (#39) kick good	7	0
1st	5:18	6	77	2:51	NDSU	Cam Miller (#7) 9-yard touchdown run, Griffin Crosa (#39) kick good	14	0
1st	1:40	7	73	3:31	MOST	Raylen Sharpe (#6) 21-yard touchdown reception from Jordan Pachot (#2), Owen Rozanc (#35) kick good	14	7
2nd	11:02	4	53	1:51	NDSU	Cole Payton (#9) 20-yard touchdown run, Griffin Crosa (#39) kick good	21	7
2nd	0:39	9	89	2:10	NDSU	Zach Mathis (#0) 33-yard touchdown reception from Cam Miller (#7), Griffin Crosa (#39) kick good	28	7
3rd	8:49	16	48	6:11	MOST	44-yard field goal by Owen Rozanc (#35)	28	10
3rd	2:40	10	66	6:03	NDSU	40-yard field goal by Griffin Crosa (#39)	31	10
4th	11:56	6	38	3:08	NDSU	Jake Lippe (#19) 4-yard touchdown reception from Cole Payton (#9), Griffin Crosa (#39) kick good	38	10
"TOP" = time of possession. For other American football terms, see Glossary of American football.							38	10

== Personnel ==
=== Coaching staff ===
Name	Position	Alma mater	Joined staff
Ryan Beard	Head coach	Western Kentucky (2012)	2020
Nick Petrino	Offense coordinator / quarterbacks coach	Western Kentucky (2014)	2020
Ronnie Fouch	Running backs coach/ recruiting coordinator/ co-offensive coordinator	Indiana State (2004)	2020
L.D. Scott	Defensive coordinator / defensive line coach	Louisville (2009)	2020
Reggie Johnson	Co-defensive coordinator / linebackers coach	Louisville (1996)	2020
Donte Ellington	Co-special teams coordinator / wide receivers coach	Northwood (2008)	2023
Nelson Fishback	Tight ends coach/ co-special teams coordinator	Western Kentucky (2015)	2020
Max Halpin	Offensive line coach	Western Kentucky (2016)	2020
Tramain Thomas	Defensive backs coach	Arkansas (2013)	2020
Michael Downing	Outside linebackers coach	Texas Christian (2017)	2023
Kevin Elliot	Safeties coach	Concord (2013)	2022
Brad Jarman	Director of football operations	Missouri State (2018)	2023

=== Roster ===
2023 Missouri State Bears Football Roster
Quarterback: 2 Jordan Pachot – (redshirt) junior (6'2, 203); 4 Cole Feuerbacher – freshman (6'3, 205); 10 Chase Brewster – (redshirt) freshman (6'5, 214); 12 Jacob Clark – junior (6'5, 226); 16 Nik Goodwin – sophomore (6'0, 200); Running back: 1 Jakairi Moses – senior (5'9, 195); 5 Jayden Becks – freshman (5'11, 185); 9 Jacardia Wright – junior (6'0, 220); 22 Ramone Green Jr. – freshman (5'9, 190); 31 Celdon Manning – junior (5'10, 182); 39 Sage White – (redshirt) freshman (5'8, 175); 40 Connor Lair – sophomore (6'1, 225); Wide receiver: 0 Jmariyae Robinson – (redshirt) freshman (6'1, 171); 6 Raylen Sharpe – junior (5'9, 172); 8 Larry Wright III – (redshirt) junior (6'4, 205); 11 Angelo Butts – sophomore (5'11, 181); 13 Liam O'Reilly – (redshirt) freshman (6'2, 190); 15 Ryan Boyd – freshman (6'0, 184); 18 Terique Owens – senior (6'3, 200); 19 Jayden Gillens – freshman (5'10, 182); 37 Keaton Renfro – sophomore (6'0, 185); 81 Deamikkio Nathan – sophomore (6'0, 195); 83 George Sims – sophomore (5'10, 190); 84 DVontae Key – junior (5'10, 185); 88 Hunter Wood – junior (6'1, 205); Tight end: 14 Stetson Moore – (redshirt) senior (6'4, 247); 24 Trae Thompson – senior (6'1, 253); 80 Watson Hafer – freshman (6'4, 225); 85 Lance Mason – sophomore (6'3, 249); 87 Gary Clinton – (redshirt) sophomore (6'4, 250); Punter: 31 Grant Burkett – junior (6'1, 180)	Offensive lineman: 52 Thomas Schulte – (redshirt) freshman (6'1, 295); 54 Tevita Fuimaono – senior (6'2, 295); 57 Gilles Tchio − (redshirt) freshman (6'3, 303); 58 Hutson Lillibridge – sophomore (6'3, 318); 66 Grant Goodson – (redshirt) sophomore (6'6, 309); 70 Justin Curtis – sophomore (6'5, 315); 71 Cash Hudson – (redshirt) freshman (6'3, 290); 72 Mark Hutchinson – (redshirt) sophomore (6'2, 298); 73 Jax Rumsey – freshman (6'3, 313); 74 Erick Cade – sophomore (6'7, 345); 75 Ivan Madrigal – junior (6'4, 302); 76 Cristian Loaiza – (redshirt) freshman (6'5, 315); 77 Danielson Ike – junior (6'6, 325); 78 Ja'Veo Toliver – junior (6'5, 302); 79 Brett Harris – (redshirt) sophomore (6'6, 293); Defensive lineman: 2 Darion Smith — DL – junior (6'4, 260); 8 Devin Goree – DL – junior (6'3, 254); 33 Caden Wiest – DL – freshman (6'4, 248); 43 Caleb Dietlin – DL – sophomore (6'3, 246); 50 Mitchell Toney – DL – freshman (6'2, 285); 90 Sterling Smithson – DL – (redshirt) sophomore (6'3, 325); 91 Tim Brantley Jr. – DL – freshman (6'1, 320); 93 Alama Collins – DL – junior (6'1, 302); 94 Raveion Harrell – DL – (redshirt) junior (6'1, 305); 95 Jalen Williams – DL – junior (6'4, 251); 96 Armon Wallace – DL – junior (6'0, 300); 97 Andrew Link – DL – freshman (6'4, 250); 98 Jayson Caldwell – DL – (redshirt) freshman (6'6, 240); Long snapper: 45 Caden Bolz – junior (6'0, 210); 47 Caden Kellow – (redshirt) freshman (6'1, 220)	Linebacker: 17 Jared Lloyd – sophomore (6'3, 231); 18 Dallas Winner-Johnson – freshman (6'5, 221); 21 Steven Ward – (redshirt) sophomore (6'0, 210); 26 Tahj Chambers – junior (6'2, 215); 28 Michael Teason – freshman (6'2, 217); 30 Von Young – junior (6'0, 218); 31 Cooper Roy – freshman (6'3, 228); 32 Kilifi Leaaetoa – senior (6'1, 220); 44 Kanye Young – sophomore (6'1, 235); 52 Ethan Merrell – sophomore (6'2, 236); Cornerback: 0 Kaunor Ashley – (redshirt) sophomore (5'10, 187); 5 Kaleno Levine – junior (5'11, 180); 6 Donovan Clark – junior (6'2, 189); 10 Dylan Simmons – sophomore (6'0, 185); 11 Jamal McMurrin – (redshirt) senior (5'11, 191); 19 Khai'mon Samuel – (redshirt) sophomore (6'1, 190); 20 Floyd Williams – freshman (6'1, 179); 22 Lemondre Joe – (redshirt) sophomore (6'0, 172); 25 Caleb Blake – (redshirt) junior (6'0, 187); 27 Jahiel Blue-Smith – (redshirt) sophomore (5'9, 180); 29 Avery Powell – (redshirt) freshman (5'10, 175); Safety: 3 DeAndre Washington – (redshirt) junior (6'2, 187); 4 Todric McGee – (redshirt) sophomore (6'1, 198); 7 Tavier Williams – junior (6'2, 196); 9 Dylan Dixson – (redshirt) freshman (6'1, 185); 12 P.J. Hall – junior (6'3, 199); 13 Jamauri Sands – freshman (6'1, 170); 16 J.J. O'Neal – sophomore (6'2, 187); 23 Heston Miller – freshman (6'1, 202); Placekicker: 35 Owen Rozanc – senior (5'10, 197); 36 Spencer Grosz – junior (5'11, 180); 37 Josh Deal – freshman (6'0, 206)
