= 2023 North Dakota State Bison football team =

American college football season

2023 North Dakota State Bison football

NCAA Division I Semifinal, L 29–31^{2OT} at Montana
- Conference: Missouri Valley Football Conference

Ranking
- STATS: No. 3
- FCS Coaches: No. 3
- Record: 11–4 (5–3 MVFC)
- Head coach: Matt Entz (5th season)
- Offensive coordinator: Tyler Roehl (5th season)
- Offensive scheme: Pro-style
- Defensive coordinator: Jason Petrino (1st season)
- Base defense: 3–4
- Home stadium: Fargodome

2023 Missouri Valley Football Conference standings
	Conf.			Overall
Team	W		L	W		L
No. 1 South Dakota State $^	8	–	0	15	–	0
No. 4 South Dakota ^	7	–	1	10	–	3
No. 3 North Dakota State ^	5	–	3	11	–	4
No. 19 Youngstown State ^	5	–	3	8	–	5
No. 16 North Dakota ^	5	–	3	7	–	5
Northern Iowa	5	–	3	6	–	5
No. 12 Southern Illinois ^	4	–	4	8	–	5
Illinois State	4	–	4	6	–	5
Missouri State	3	–	5	4	–	7
Murray State	1	–	7	2	–	9
Indiana State	1	–	7	1	–	10
Western Illinois	0	–	8	0	–	11
$ – Conference champion; ^ – FCS playoff participant; Rankings from STATS Poll

The 2023 North Dakota State Bison football team represented North Dakota State University as a member of the Missouri Valley Football Conference (MVFC) during the 2023 NCAA Division I FCS football season. The Bison were led by fifth-year head coach Matt Entz. Following the season he was hired by USC as the team's linebackers coach. The Bison played home games at the Fargodome in Fargo, North Dakota. The North Dakota State Bison football team drew an average home attendance of 15,121 in 2023.

The Bison finished the regular season with an overall record of 8–3 and 5–3 in MVFC play. NDSU was unseeded and played in the first round of the FCS playoffs. The Bison then beat Drake in the first round, sixth-seeded Montana State in the second round in overtime, third-seeded South Dakota in the quarterfinals, before falling to second-seeded Montana in the semifinals. It was the first time that NDSU missed the championship game in a fall season since 2016, and the first time in NDSU's Division I era that they didn't win a national title for two consecutive seasons.

== Schedule ==
Date	Time	Opponent	Rank	Site	TV	Result	Attendance
September 2	2:30 pm	vs. Eastern Washington*	No. 2	U.S. Bank Stadium; Minneapolis, MN	ABC ND/ESPN+	W 35–10	22,546
September 9	2:30 pm	Maine*	No. 2	Fargodome; Fargo, ND	ABC ND/ESPN+	W 44–7	15,044
September 16	2:30 pm	Central Arkansas*	No. 2	Fargodome; Fargo, ND	ABC ND/ESPN+	W 49–31	15,016
September 30	1:00 pm	South Dakota^{†}	No. 2	Fargodome; Fargo, ND	ABC ND/MidcoSN/ESPN+	L 19–24	18,342
October 7	2:00 pm	at Missouri State	No. 7	Robert W. Plaster Stadium; Springfield, MO	ESPN+	W 38–10	8,727
October 14	1:00 pm	at No. 15 North Dakota	No. 6	Alerus Center; Grand Forks, ND (Nickel Trophy)	ABC ND/MidcoSN/ESPN+	L 24–49	13,091
October 21	2:30 pm	Western Illinois	No. 14	Fargodome; Fargo, ND	ABC ND/ESPN+	W 52–7	14,255
October 28	2:30 pm	Murray State	No. 12	Fargodome; Fargo, ND	ABC ND/ESPN+	W 38–6	13,876
November 4	2:00 pm	at No. 1 South Dakota State	No. 11	Dana J. Dykhouse Stadium; Brookings, SD (Dakota Marker)	ABC ND/MidcoSN/ESPN+	L 16–33	19,431
November 11	2:30 pm	No. 11 Southern Illinois	No. 12	Fargodome; Fargo, ND	ABC ND/ESPN+	W 34–10	14,191
November 18	4:00 pm	at No. 22 Northern Iowa	No. 9	UNI-Dome; Cedar Falls, IA	ABC ND/ESPN+	W 48–27	9,852
November 25	2:30 pm	Drake*	No. 8	Fargodome; Fargo, ND (NCAA Division I First Round)	ESPN+	W 66–3	7,798
December 2	2:00 pm	at No. 5 Montana State*	No. 8	Bobcat Stadium; Bozeman, MT (NCAA Division I Second Round)	ESPN+	W 35–34 ^{OT}	17,247
December 9	1:30 p.m.	at No. 3 South Dakota*	No. 8	DakotaDome; Vermillion, SD (NCAA Division I Quarterfinal)	ABC	W 45–17	9,141
December 16	3:30 p.m.	at No. 2 Montana*	No. 8	Washington-Grizzly Stadium; Missoula, MT (NCAA Division I Semifinal)	ESPN2	L 29–31 ^{2OT}	26,544
*Non-conference game; ^{†}Homecoming; Rankings from STATS Poll released prior to the game; All times are in Central time

== Game summaries ==
=== Regular season ===
==== Eastern Washington ====
Eastern Washington Eagles (0–0) vs No. 2 North Dakota State Bison (0–0)

Quarter	1	2	3	4	Total
Eagles	7	0	0	3	10
No. 2 Bison	14	7	7	7	35

at U.S. Bank Stadium, Minneapolis, MN

- Date: September 2, 2023
- Game time: 2:30 p.m. (CT)
- Game weather: Indoors; 70 °F (21 °C)
- Game attendance: 22,546
- Referee: Jason Berg
- TV: ESPN+

Statistics	Eastern Washington	North Dakota State
First downs	16	22
Plays–yards	67–339	67–513
Rushes–yards	28–72	39–337
Passing yards	267	176
Passing: comp–att–int	23–39–1	19–28–0
Time of possession	26:13	30:35

Team	Category	Player	Statistics
Eastern Washington	Passing	Kekoa Visperas	23/39, 266 yds, TD, INT
Eastern Washington	Rushing	Michael Wortham	5 car, 41 yds
Eastern Washington	Receiving	Efton Chism III	7 rec, 74 yds
North Dakota State	Passing	Cam Miller	18/25, 174 yds, 2 TD
North Dakota State	Rushing	Cole Payton	6 car, 104 yds, TD
North Dakota State	Receiving	Zach Mathis	4 rec, 53 yds

Scoring summary

Quarter	Time	Drive			Team	Scoring information	Score	
Quarter	Time	Plays	Yards	TOP	Team	Scoring information	EWU	NDSU
1st	9:23	8	80	3:12	NDSU	Joe Stoffel (#84) 7-yard touchdown reception from Cam Miller (#7), Griffin Crosa (#39) kick good	0	7
1st	7:02	3	72	0:46	NDSU	TaMerik Williams (#22) 54-yard touchdown run, Griffin Crosa (#39) kick good	0	14
1st	4:55	7	75	2:07	EWU	Nolan Ulm (#17) 34-yard touchdown reception from Kekoa Visperas (#0), Soren McKee (#96) kick good	7	14
2nd	10:10	4	92	2:10	NDSU	Cole Payton (#9) 70-yard touchdown run, Griffin Crosa (#39) kick good	7	21
3rd	2:56	9	70	4:42	NDSU	Cam Miller (#7) 14-yard touchdown run, Griffin Crosa (#39) kick good	7	28
4th	8:30	13	86	7:16	NDSU	Joe Stoffel (#82) 3-yard touchdown reception from Cam Miller (#7), Griffin Crosa (#39) kick good	7	35
4th	4:01	12	61	4:23	EWU	36-yard field goal by Soren McKee (#96)	10	35
"TOP" = time of possession. For other American football terms, see Glossary of American football.							10	35

==== Maine ====
Maine Black Bears (0–1) vs No. 2 North Dakota State Bison (1–0)

Quarter	1	2	3	4	Total
Black Bears	0	0	0	7	7
No. 2 Bison	6	10	14	14	44

at Fargodome, Fargo, ND

- Date: September 9, 2023
- Game time: 2:30 p.m. (CT)
- Game weather: Indoors; 70 °F (21 °C)
- Game attendance: 15,044
- Referee: Jason Perkins
- TV: ESPN+

Statistics	Maine	North Dakota State
First downs	13	24
Plays–yards	54–223	71–456
Rushes–yards	25–106	47–264
Passing yards	117	192
Passing: comp–att–int	18–29–3	17–24–0
Time of possession	24:51	35:09

Team	Category	Player	Statistics
Maine	Passing	Derek Robertson	18/29, 117 yds, 3 INT
Maine	Rushing	Tristen Kenan	14 car, 53 yds
Maine	Receiving	Jamie Lamson	6 rec, 42 yds
North Dakota State	Passing	Cam Miller	14/19, 152 yds
North Dakota State	Rushing	Cole Payton	8 car, 102 yds, 2 TD
North Dakota State	Receiving	Zach Mathis	4 rec, 62 yds

Scoring summary

Quarter	Time	Drive			Team	Scoring information	Score	
Quarter	Time	Plays	Yards	TOP	Team	Scoring information	MAINE	NDSU
1st	11:29	4	5	2:00	NDSU	27-yard field goal by Griffin Crosa (#39)	0	3
1st	4:01	5	1	1:51	NDSU	40-yard field goal by Griffin Crosa (#39)	0	6
2nd	4:15	11	40	5:09	NDSU	31-yard field goal by Griffin Crosa (#39)	0	9
2nd	0:52	6	48	1:37	NDSU	Cam Miller (#7) 2-yard touchdown run, Griffin Crosa (#39) kick good	0	16
3rd	8:22	12	75	6:38	NDSU	Cam Miller (#7) 1-yard touchdown run, Griffin Crosa (#39) kick good	0	23
3rd	1:18	5	30	2:42	NDSU	Cole Payton (#9) 2-yard touchdown run, Griffin Crosa (#39) kick good	0	30
4th	12:54	2	59	0:52	NDSU	Cole Payton (#9) 61-yard touchdown run, Griffin Crosa (#39) kick good	0	37
4th	6:06	12	89	6:43	MAINE	John Gay (#46) 13-yard touchdown run, Cody Williams (#59) kick good	7	37
4th	0:22	9	59	5:37	NDSU	Owen Johnson (#4) 1-yard touchdown run, Griffin Crosa (#39) kick good	7	44
"TOP" = time of possession. For other American football terms, see Glossary of American football.							7	44

==== Central Arkansas ====
Central Arkansas Bears (1–1) vs No. 2 North Dakota State Bison (2–0)

Quarter	1	2	3	4	Total
Bears	7	10	0	14	31
No. 2 Bison	21	14	7	7	49

at Fargodome, Fargo, ND

- Date: September 16, 2023
- Game time: 2:30 p.m. (CT)
- Game weather: Indoors; 70 °F (21 °C)
- Game attendance: 15,016
- Referee: CJ Jackson
- TV: ESPN+

Statistics	Central Arkansas	North Dakota State
First downs	18	26
Plays–yards	58–431	62–481
Rushes–yards	27–221	40–235
Passing yards	210	246
Passing: comp–att–int	22–31–1	20–22–0
Time of possession	25:25	34:35

Team	Category	Player	Statistics
Central Arkansas	Passing	Will McElvain	22/31, 210 yds, TD, INT
Central Arkansas	Rushing	ShunDerrick Powell	18 car, 218 yds, 2 TD
Central Arkansas	Receiving	Myles Butler	6 rec, 88 yds, TD
North Dakota State	Passing	Cam Miller	18/19, 200 yds, 2 TD
North Dakota State	Rushing	TaMerik Williams	13 car, 83 yds, TD
North Dakota State	Receiving	Eli Green	4 rec, 86 yds

Scoring summary

Quarter	Time	Drive			Team	Scoring information	Score	
Quarter	Time	Plays	Yards	TOP	Team	Scoring information	UCA	NDSU
1st	12:33	5	81	2:22	NDSU	Cam Miller (#7) 1-yard touchdown run, Griffin Crosa (#39) kick good	0	7
1st	6:51				NDSU	Interception returned 35 yards for touchdown by Eli Mostaert (#53), Grffin Crosa (#39) kick good	0	14
1st	5:25	3	75	1:26	UCA	ShunDerrick Powell (#27) 43-yard touchdown run, Jake Gaster (#22) kick good	7	14
1st	2:45	5	66	2:33	NDSU	TK Marshall (#28) 11-yard touchdown reception from Cam Miller (#7), Griffin Crosa (#39) kick good	7	21
2nd	12:03	12	58	5:42	UCA	35-yard field goal by Jake Gaster (#22)	10	21
2nd	7:07	8	78	4:50	NDSU	Hunter Brozio (#49) 6-yard touchdown reception from Cam Miller (#7), Griffin Crosa (#39) kick good	10	28
2nd	6:24	2	75	0:43	UCA	ShunDerrick Powell (#27) 71-yard touchdown run, Jake Gaster kick good	17	28
2nd	1:41	9	75	4:43	NDSU	Cole Payton (#9) 26-yard touchdown run, Grffin Crosa (#39) kick good	17	35
3rd	7:46	9	49	5:26	NDSU	Cam Miller (#7) 13-yard touchdown run, Griffin Crosa (#39) kick good	17	42
4th	13:11	14	81	7:47	NDSU	TaMerik Williams (#22) 8-yard touchdown run, Griffin Crosa (#39) kick good	17	49
4th	6:53	14	75	6:18	UCA	Myles Butler (#14) 4-yard touchdown reception from Will McElvain (#2), Jake Gaster (#22) kick good	24	49
4th	2:16	7	69	2:51	UCA	Darius Hale (#4) 10-yard touchdown run, Jake Gaster (#22) kick good	31	49
"TOP" = time of possession. For other American football terms, see Glossary of American football.							31	49

==== South Dakota ====
South Dakota Coyotes (2–1) vs No. 2 North Dakota State Bison (3–0)

Quarter	1	2	3	4	Total
Coyotes	7	14	0	3	24
No. 2 Bison	3	0	7	9	19

at Fargodome, Fargo, ND

- Date: September 30, 2023
- Game time: 1:00 p.m. (CT)
- Game weather: Indoors; 70 °F (21 °C)
- Game attendance: 18,342
- Referee: Marcel Kerr
- TV: ESPN+

Statistics	South Dakota	North Dakota State
First downs	15	23
Plays–yards	38–269	65–348
Rushes–yards	26–101	40–194
Passing yards	168	154
Passing: comp–att–int	10–12–0	18–25–1
Time of possession	24:28	35:32

Team	Category	Player	Statistics
South Dakota	Passing	Aidan Bouman	10/12, 168 yds, 2 TD
South Dakota	Rushing	Nate Thomas	14 car, 49 yds
South Dakota	Receiving	Carter Bell	5 rec, 124 yds, 2 TD
North Dakota State	Passing	Cam Miller	18/25, 154 yds, TD, INT
North Dakota State	Rushing	Cam Miller	12 car, 70 yds
North Dakota State	Receiving	Zach Mathis	4 rec, 42 yds

Scoring summary

Quarter	Time	Drive			Team	Scoring information	Score	
Quarter	Time	Plays	Yards	TOP	Team	Scoring information	USD	NDSU
1st	11:23	6	75	3:37	USD	Carter Bell (#14) 50-yard touchdown reception from Aidan Bouman (#2), Will Leyland (#15) kick good	7	0
1st	1:16	16	56	10:07	NDSU	37-yard field goal by Griffin Crosa (#39)	7	3
2nd	9:47	11	78	6:23	USD	Keyondre Jones (#21) 8-yard touchdown run, Will Leyland (#15) kick good	14	3
2nd	5:30	2	46	1:11	USD	Carter Bell (#14) 52-yard touchdown reception from Aidan Bouman (#2), Will Leyland (#15) kick good	21	3
3rd	7:23	12	89	7:31	NDSU	Cam Miller (#7) 7-yard touchdown run, Griffin Crosa (#39) kick good	21	10
4th	11:10	16	80	9:24	NDSU	26-yard field goal by Griffin Crosa (#39)	21	13
4th	2:49	12	54	8:14	USD	37-yard field goal by Will Leyland (#15)	24	13
4th	0:36	12	75	2:13	NDSU	Joe Stoffel (#82) 2-yard touchdown reception from Cam Miller (#7), 2-point pass failed	24	19
"TOP" = time of possession. For other American football terms, see Glossary of American football.							24	19

==== Missouri State ====
No. 7 North Dakota State Bison (3–1) vs. Missouri State Bears (1–3)

Quarter	1	2	3	4	Total
No. 7 Bison	14	14	3	7	38
Bears	7	0	3	0	10

at Robert W. Plaster Stadium, Springfield, MO

- Date: October 7, 2023
- Game time: 2:00 p.m. (CT)
- Game weather: Sunny; 60 °F (16 °C); Wind: NW 8 mph
- Game attendance: 8,727
- Referee: Jason Berg
- TV: ESPN+

Statistics	North Dakota State	Missouri State
First downs	23	21
Plays–yards	64–534	64–351
Rushes–yards	40–258	20–82
Passing yards	276	269
Passing: comp–att–int	18–24–0	25–44–3
Time of possession	33:28	26:32

Team	Category	Player	Statistics
North Dakota State	Passing	Cam Miller	16/20, 256 yds, 2 TD
North Dakota State	Rushing	Owen Johnson	9 car, 82 yds
North Dakota State	Receiving	Zach Mathis	6 rec, 160 yds, 2 TD
Missouri State	Passing	Jordan Pachot	25/44, 269 yds, TD, 3 INT
Missouri State	Rushing	Jacardia Wright	15 car, 65 yds
Missouri State	Receiving	Raylen Sharpe	13 rec, 153 yds, TD

Scoring summary

Quarter	Time	Drive			Team	Scoring information	Score	
Quarter	Time	Plays	Yards	TOP	Team	Scoring information	NDSU	MOST
1st	9:31	9	73	5:21	NDSU	Zach Mathis (#0) 23-yard touchdown reception from Cam Miller (#7), Griffin Crosa (#39) kick good	7	0
1st	5:18	6	77	2:51	NDSU	Cam Miller (#7) 9-yard touchdown run, Griffin Crosa (#39) kick good	14	0
1st	1:40	7	73	3:31	MOST	Raylen Sharpe (#6) 21-yard touchdown reception from Jordan Pachot (#2), Owen Rozanc (#35) kick good	14	7
2nd	11:02	4	53	1:51	NDSU	Cole Payton (#9) 20-yard touchdown run, Griffin Crosa (#39) kick good	21	7
2nd	0:39	9	89	2:10	NDSU	Zach Mathis (#0) 33-yard touchdown reception from Cam Miller (#7), Griffin Crosa (#39) kick good	28	7
3rd	8:49	16	48	6:11	MOST	44-yard field goal by Owen Rozanc (#35)	28	10
3rd	2:40	10	66	6:03	NDSU	40-yard field goal by Griffin Crosa (#39)	31	10
4th	11:56	6	38	3:08	NDSU	Jake Lippe (#19) 4-yard touchdown reception from Cole Payton (#9), Griffin Crosa (#39) kick good	38	10
"TOP" = time of possession. For other American football terms, see Glossary of American football.							38	10

==== North Dakota ====
No. 6 North Dakota State Bison (4–1) vs. No. 15 North Dakota Fighting Hawks (3–2)

Quarter	1	2	3	4	Total
No. 6 Bison	7	10	0	7	24
No. 15 Fighting Hawks	21	7	7	14	49

at Alerus Center, Grand Forks, ND

- Date: October 14, 2023
- Game time: 1:00 p.m. (CT)
- Game weather: Indoors; 72 °F (22 °C)
- Game attendance: 13,091
- Referee: Aaron Adams
- TV: ESPN+

Statistics	North Dakota State	North Dakota
First downs	17	18
Plays–yards	57–364	51–328
Rushes–yards	38–15	39–215
Passing yards	214	113
Passing: comp–att–int	13–19–1	9–12–0
Time of possession	31:38	28:22

Team	Category	Player	Statistics
North Dakota State	Passing	Cam Miller	11/16, 175 yds, TD, INT
North Dakota State	Rushing	Cam Miller	9 car, 48 yds, TD
North Dakota State	Receiving	Eli Green	4 rec, 96 yds
North Dakota	Passing	Tommy Schuster	9/12, 113 yds, 2 TD
North Dakota	Rushing	Gaven Ziebarth	18 car, 156 yds, 3 TD
North Dakota	Receiving	Bo Belquist	2 rec, 41 yds, TD

Scoring summary

Quarter	Time	Drive			Team	Scoring information	Score	
Quarter	Time	Plays	Yards	TOP	Team	Scoring information	NDSU	UND
1st	14:47				UND	Kickoff returned 100 yards for touchdown by Luke Skokna (#7), CJ Elrichs (#53) kick good	0	7
1st	10:00	9	75	4:47	NDSU	Cam Miller (#7) 26-yard touchdown run, Griffin Crosa (#39) kick good	7	7
1st	5:28	8	73	4:27	UND	Gaven Ziebarth (#28) 5-yard touchdown run, CJ Elrichs (#53) kick good	7	14
1st	1:40	4	35	1:40	UND	Luke Skokna (#7) 13-yard touchdown reception from Tommy Schuster (#2), CJ Elrichs (#53) kick good	7	21
2nd	13:28	6	58	3:07	NDSU	36-yard field goal by Griffin Crosa (#39)	10	21
2nd	4:32	11	67	7:26	NDSU	Joe Stoffel (#82) 1-yard touchdown reception from Cam Miller (#7), Griffin Crosa (#39) kick good	17	21
2nd	0:13	10	75	4:19	UND	Luke Skokna (#7) 4-yard touchdown run, CJ Elrichs (#53) kick good	17	28
3rd	7:13	4	23	2:14	UND	Gaven Ziebarth (#28) 7-yard touchdown run, CJ Elrichs (#53) kick good	17	35
4th	10:58	15	63	9:39	UND	Bo Belquist (#1) 9-yard touchdown reception from Tommy Schuster (#2), CJ Elrichs (#53) kick good	17	42
4th	7:18	3	65	1:43	UND	Gaven Ziebarth (#28) 59-yard touchdown run, CJ Elrichs (#53) kick good	17	49
4th	2:42	10	75	4:36	NDSU	Jake Lippe (#13) 6-yard touchdown reception from Cole Payton (#9), Griffin Crosa (#39) kick good	24	49
"TOP" = time of possession. For other American football terms, see Glossary of American football.							24	49

==== Western Illinois ====
Western Illinois Leathernecks (0–6) vs No. 14 North Dakota State Bison (4–2)

Quarter	1	2	3	4	Total
Leathernecks	0	0	0	7	7
No. 14 Bison	14	24	14	0	52

at Fargodome, Fargo, ND

- Date: October 21, 2023
- Game time: 2:30 p.m. (CT)
- Game weather: Indoors; 70 °F (21 °C)
- Game attendance: 14,255
- Referee: Gregory Gompf
- TV: ESPN+

Statistics	Western Illinois	North Dakota State
First downs	10	22
Plays–yards	52–184	60–625
Rushes–yards	39–113	44–425
Passing yards	71	200
Passing: comp–att–int	8–13–1	11–16–0
Time of possession	27:41	32:19

Team	Category	Player	Statistics
Western Illinois	Passing	Matt Morrissey	8/13, 71 yds, TD, INT
Western Illinois	Rushing	Seth Glatz	11 car, 64 yds
Western Illinois	Receiving	AJ Coons	2 rec, 48 yds, TD
North Dakota State	Passing	Cam Miller	8/12, 103 yds
North Dakota State	Rushing	RaJa Nelson	3 car, 103 yds, TD
North Dakota State	Receiving	Joe Stoffel	2 rec, 84 yds, TD

Scoring summary

Quarter	Time	Drive			Team	Scoring information	Score	
Quarter	Time	Plays	Yards	TOP	Team	Scoring information	WIU	NDSU
1st	9:02	10	10	5:58	NDSU	TK Marshall (#28) 1-yard touchdown run, Griffin Crosa (#39) kick good	0	7
1st	1:51	7	65	4:11	NDSU	TK Marshall (#28) 1-yard touchdown run, Griffin Crosa (#39) kick good	0	14
2nd	13:12	4	20	1:35	NDSU	Barika Kpeenu (#8) 5-yard touchdown run, Griffin Crosa (#39) kick good	0	21
2nd	11:14	1	76	0:13	NDSU	RaJa Nelson (#6) 76-yard touchdown run, Griffin Crosa (#39) kick good	0	28
2nd	8:48	1	49	0:11	NDSU	Joe Stoffel (#82) 49-yard touchdown reception from Cole Payton (#9), Griffin Crosa (#39) kick good	0	35
2nd	0:05	12	81	5:14	NDSU	29-yard field goal by Griffin Crosa (#39)	0	38
3rd	10:45	4	65	2:13	NDSU	TK Marshall (#28) 38-yard touchdown run, Griffin Crosa (#39) kick good	0	45
3rd	4:36	6	75	3:44	NDSU	Barika Kpeenu (#8) 24-yard touchdown run, Griffin Crosa (#39) kick good	0	52
4th	6:26	2	48	0:44	WIU	AJ Coons (#15) 43-yard touchdown reception from Matt Morrissey (#7), Owen Valek (#57) kick good	7	52
"TOP" = time of possession. For other American football terms, see Glossary of American football.							7	52

==== Murray State ====
Murray State Racers (2–5) vs No. 12 North Dakota State Bison (5–2)

Quarter	1	2	3	4	Total
Racers	0	3	3	0	6
No. 12 Bison	21	7	7	3	38

at Fargodome, Fargo, ND

- Date: October 28, 2023
- Game time: 2:30 p.m. (CT)
- Game weather: Indoors; 70 °F (21 °C)
- Game attendance: 13,876
- Referee: Jason Perkins
- TV: ESPN+

Statistics	Murray State	North Dakota State
First downs	11	19
Plays–yards	55–164	62–377
Rushes–yards	28–56	34–175
Passing yards	108	202
Passing: comp–att–int	15–27–1	20–28–0
Time of possession	28:28	31:32

Team	Category	Player	Statistics
Murray State	Passing	DJ Williams	15/26, 108 yds, INT
Murray State	Rushing	Jawaun Northington	9 car, 37 yds
Murray State	Receiving	Michael Fox	4 rec, 27 yds
North Dakota State	Passing	Cam Miller	18/24, 192 yds, 2 TD
North Dakota State	Rushing	Cam Miller	6 car, 55 yds, 2 TD
North Dakota State	Receiving	Zach Mathis	8 rec, 74 yds, TD

Scoring summary

Quarter	Time	Drive			Team	Scoring information	Score	
Quarter	Time	Plays	Yards	TOP	Team	Scoring information	MUST	NDSU
1st	12:14	5	65	2:46	NDSU	Cam Miller (#7) 15-yard touchdown run, Griffin Crosa (#39) kick good	0	7
1st	5:35	10	77	5:04	NDSU	Cam Miller (#7) 9-yard touchdown run, Griffin Crosa (#39) kick good	0	14
1st	3:11	4	29	2:19	NDSU	Braylon Henderson (#1) 8-yard touchdown reception from Cam Miller (#7), Griffin Crosa (#39) kick good	0	21
2nd	6:23	8	57	5:13	NDSU	Zach Mathis (#0) 15-yard touchdown reception from Cam Miller (#7), Griffin Crosa (#39) kick good	0	28
2nd	1:49	11	40	4:34	MUST	53-yard field goal by James London (#83)	3	28
3rd	13:07				NDSU	Punt returned 66 yards for touchdown by Jayden Price (#23), Griffin Crosa (#39) kick good	3	35
3rd	5:49	13	63	7:10	MUST	39-yard field goal by Matt Maldonado (#37)	6	35
4th	4:05	4	-2	1:21	NDSU	36-yard field goal by Griffin Crosa (#39)	6	38
"TOP" = time of possession. For other American football terms, see Glossary of American football.							6	38

==== South Dakota State ====
No. 11 North Dakota State Bison (6–2) vs. No. 1 South Dakota State Jackrabbits (8–0)

Quarter	1	2	3	4	Total
No. 11 Bison	6	3	0	7	16
No. 1 Jackrabbits	7	13	7	6	33

at Dana J. Dykhouse Stadium, Brookings, SD

- Date: November 4, 2023
- Game time: 2:00 p.m. (CT)
- Game weather: Sunny; 54 °F (12 °C); Wind: S 10 MPH
- Game attendance: 19,431
- Referee: Aaron Adams
- TV: ESPN+

Statistics	North Dakota State	South Dakota State
First downs	19	17
Plays–yards	64–325	52–365
Rushes–yards	35–158	33–152
Passing yards	167	213
Passing: comp–att–int	18–29–2	12–19–0
Time of possession	30:18	29:42

Team	Category	Player	Statistics
North Dakota State	Passing	Cam Miller	18/29, 167 yds, 2 TD, 2 INT
North Dakota State	Rushing	Cam Miller	17 car, 93 yds
North Dakota State	Receiving	Eli Green	4 rec, 47 yds
South Dakota State	Passing	Mark Gronowski	12/19, 213 yds, 2 TD
South Dakota State	Rushing	Isaiah Davis	17 car, 106 yds, TD
South Dakota State	Receiving	Jadon Janke	5 rec, 89 yds, 2 TD

Scoring summary

Quarter	Time	Drive			Team	Scoring information	Score	
Quarter	Time	Plays	Yards	TOP	Team	Scoring information	NDSU	SDSU
1st	7:44	12	75	7:16	NDSU	Zach Mathis (#0) 1-yard touchdown reception from Cam Miller (#7), Griffin Crosa (#39) kick blocked	6	0
1st	0:46	13	75	6:58	SDSU	Isaiah Davis (#22) 1-yard touchdown run, Hunter Dustman (#10) kick good	6	7
2nd	10:09	11	52	4:51	NDSU	27-yard field goal by Griffin Crosa (#39)	9	7
2nd	7:12	6	57	2:50	SDSU	31-yard field goal by Hunter Dustman (#10)	9	10
2nd	5:15	3	46	0:55	SDSU	Jadon Janke (#1) 46-yard touchdown reception from Mark Gronowski (#11), Hunter Dustman kick good	9	17
2nd	1:50	6	27	3:14	SDSU	21-yard field goal by Hunter Dustman (#10)	9	20
3rd	11:26	6	75	3:34	SDSU	Jadon Janke (#1) 7-yard touchdown reception from Mark Gronowski (#11), Hunter Dustman (#10) kick good	9	27
4th	11:52	8	45	4:22	SDSU	44-yard field goal by Hunter Dustman (#10)	9	30
4th	6:33	11	75	5:19	NDSU	Zach Mathis (#0) 10-yard touchdown reception from Cam Miller (#7), Eli Ozick (#81) kick good	16	30
4th	0:56	4	6	1:51	SDSU	26-yard field goal by Hunter Dustman (#10)	16	33
"TOP" = time of possession. For other American football terms, see Glossary of American football.							16	33

==== Southern Illinois ====
No. 11 Southern Illinois Salukis (6–3) vs No. 12 North Dakota State Bison (6–3)

Quarter	1	2	3	4	Total
No. 11 Salukis	7	3	0	0	10
No. 12 Bison	7	6	7	14	34

at Fargodome, Fargo, ND

- Date: November 11, 2023
- Game time: 2:30 p.m. (CT)
- Game weather: Indoors; 70 °F (21 °C)
- Game attendance: 14,191
- Referee: Marcel Kerr
- TV: ESPN+

Statistics	Southern Illinois	North Dakota State
First downs	12	21
Plays–yards	55–206	64–449
Rushes–yards	26–55	45–217
Passing yards	151	232
Passing: comp–att–int	16–29–1	15–19–0
Time of possession	21:44	38:16

Team	Category	Player	Statistics
Southern Illinois	Passing	Nic Baker	12/17, 114 yds
Southern Illinois	Rushing	Ro Elliott	10 car, 25 yds, TD
Southern Illinois	Receiving	Izaiah Hartrup	5 rec, 71 yds
North Dakota State	Passing	Cam Miller	15/19, 232 yds
North Dakota State	Rushing	TaMerik Williams	8 car, 51 yds, 2 TD
North Dakota State	Receiving	RaJa Nelson	4 rec, 81 yds

Scoring summary

Quarter	Time	Drive			Team	Scoring information	Score	
Quarter	Time	Plays	Yards	TOP	Team	Scoring information	SIU	NDSU
1st	10:36	7	75	4:24	NDSU	Cam Miller (#7) 8-yard touchdown run, Griffin Crosa (#39) kick good	0	7
1st	5:34	11	65	4:56	SIU	Ro Elliott (#1) 4-yard touchdown run, Jake Baumgarte (#91) kick good	7	7
2nd	14:57	11	76	5:26	NDSU	25-yard field goal by Griffin Crosa (#39)	7	10
2nd	2:27	7	42	4:41	NDSU	44-yard field goal by Griffin Crosa (#39)	7	13
2nd	0:19	6	30	0:50	SIU	32-yard field goal by Jake Baumgarte (#91)	10	13
3rd	8:47	8	70	4:34	NDSU	TaMerik Williams (#22) 34-yard touchdown run, Griffin Crosa (#39) kick good	10	20
4th	13:03	7	59	3:32	NDSU	TaMerik Williams (#22) 1-yard touchdown run, Griffin Crosa (#39) kick good	10	27
4th	8:40	5	31	2:44	NDSU	TK Marshall (#28) 2-yard touchdown run, Griffin Crosa (#39) kick good	10	34
"TOP" = time of possession. For other American football terms, see Glossary of American football.							10	34

==== Northern Iowa ====
No. 9 North Dakota State Bison (7–3) vs. No. 22 Northern Iowa Panthers (6–4)

Quarter	1	2	3	4	Total
No. 9 Bison	14	13	7	14	48
No. 22 Panthers	3	7	10	7	27

at UNI-Dome, Cedar Falls, IA

- Date: November 18, 2023
- Game time: 4:00 p.m. (CT)
- Game weather: Indoors; 70 °F (21 °C)
- Game attendance: 9,852
- Referee: Rick Warne
- TV: ESPN+

Statistics	North Dakota State	Northern Iowa
First downs	18	25
Plays–yards	58–399	67–407
Rushes–yards	36–161	29–65
Passing yards	238	342
Passing: comp–att–int	17–22–0	24–38–4
Time of possession	30:33	28:15

Team	Category	Player	Statistics
North Dakota State	Passing	Cam Miller	17/22, 238 yds, 2 TD
North Dakota State	Rushing	Cole Payton	4 car, 79 yds, 2 TD
North Dakota State	Receiving	RaJa Nelson	6 rec, 113 yds, TD
Northern Iowa	Passing	Theo Day	24/38, 342 yds, 2 TD, 4 INT
Northern Iowa	Rushing	Tyjahree Edwards	12 car, 67 yds, TD
Northern Iowa	Receiving	Sam Schnee	8 rec, 164 yds, TD

Scoring summary

Quarter	Time	Drive			Team	Scoring information	Score	
Quarter	Time	Plays	Yards	TOP	Team	Scoring information	NDSU	UNI
1st	11:30	7	68	3:23	NDSU	Eli Green (#13) 36-yard touchdown reception from Cam Miller (#7), Griffin Crosa (#39) kick good	7	0
1st	7:05	12	62	4:19	UNI	26-yard field goal by Matthew Cook (#97)	7	3
1st	1:12	10	75	5:53	NDSU	Cam Miller (#7) 1-yard touchdown run, Griffin Crosa (#39) kick good	14	3
2nd	13:51	4	30	1:03	NDSU	RaJa Nelson (#3) 15-yard touchdown reception from Cam Miller (#7), Griffin Crosa (#39) kick good	21	3
2nd	11:28	5	84	2:17	UNI	Tyjahree Edwards (#2) 40-yard touchdown run, Matthew Cook (#97) kick good	21	10
2nd	7:11	4	1	0:40	NDSU	34-yard field goal by Griffin Crosa (#39)	24	10
2nd	0:13	13	32	6:15	NDSU	37-yard field goal by Griffin Crosa (#39)	27	10
3rd	9:30	10	61	5:26	UNI	30-yard field goal by Matthew Cook (#97)	27	13
3rd	5:48	1	65	0:11	NDSU	Cole Payton (#9) 65-yard touchdown run, Griffin Crosa (#39) kick good	34	13
3rd	0:56	10	75	4:52	UNI	Sam Schnee (#23) 11-yard touchdown reception from Theo Day (#12), Matthew Cook (#97) kick good	34	20
4th	12:47	7	75	3:09	NDSU	Cole Payton (#9) 23-yard touchdown run, Griffin Crosa (#39) kick good	41	20
4th	11:59				NDSU	Interception returned 75 yards for touchdown by Cole Wisniewski (#31), Griffin Crosa (#39) kick good	48	20
4th	9:11	9	65	2:48	UNI	Amauri Pesek-Hickson (#5) 15-yard touchdown reception from Theo Day (#12), Matthew Cook (#97) kick good	48	27
"TOP" = time of possession. For other American football terms, see Glossary of American football.							48	27

=== NCAA Division I playoffs ===
==== Drake (first round) ====
No. 8 North Dakota State Bison (8–3) vs. Drake Bulldogs (8–3)

Quarter	1	2	3	4	Total
Bulldogs	3	0	0	0	3
No. 8 Bison	14	21	10	21	66

at Fargodome, Fargo, ND

- Date: November 25, 2023
- Game time: 2:30 p.m. (CT)
- Game weather: Indoors; 70 °F (21 °C)
- Game attendance: 7,798
- Referee: Brad Carrell
- TV announcers (ESPN+): Noah Reed, Charles Arbuckle

Statistics	Drake	North Dakota State
First downs	12	27
Plays–yards	56–177	64–547
Rushes–yards	31–61	51–318
Passing yards	116	229
Passing: comp–att–int	14–25–2	12–13–0
Time of possession	26:24	33:36

Team	Category	Player	Statistics
Drake	Passing	Luke Bailey	13/24, 111 yds, 2 INT
Drake	Rushing	Dorian Boyland	9 car, 67 yds
Drake	Receiving	Trey Radocha	4 rec, 41 yds
North Dakota State	Passing	Cam Miller	10/11, 206 yds, 2 TD
North Dakota State	Rushing	Cole Payton	13 car, 104 yds, 2 TD
North Dakota State	Receiving	Eli Green	3 rec, 91 yds, TD

Scoring summary

Quarter	Time	Drive			Team	Scoring information	Score	
Quarter	Time	Plays	Yards	TOP	Team	Scoring information	DRAKE	NDSU
1st	12:34	6	37	2:18	DRAKE	30-yard field goal by Shane Dunning (#89)	3	0
1st	10:10	5	65	2:24	NDSU	Cole Payton (#9) 20-yard touchdown run, Griffin Crosa (#39) kick good	3	7
1st	3:40	5	25	2:19	NDSU	RaJa Nelson (#3) 5-yard touchdown run, Griffin Crosa (#39) kick good	3	14
2nd	14:08	4	77	1:58	NDSU	RaJa Nelson (#3) 40-yard touchdown reception from Cam Miller (#7), Griffin Crosa (#39) kick good	3	21
2nd	4:10	12	90	7:11	NDSU	TaMerik Williams (#22) 4-yard touchdown run, Griffin Crosa (#39) kick good	3	28
2nd	0:17	4	80	0:34	NDSU	Eli Green (#13) 34-yard touchdown reception from Cam Miller (#7), Griffin Crosa (#39) kick good	3	35
3rd	9:57	8	26	4:11	NDSU	31-yard field goal by Griffin Crosa (#39)	3	38
3rd	4:30	7	48	4:14	NDSU	Barika Kpeenu (#8) 14-yard touchdown run, Griffin Crosa (#39) kick good	3	45
4th	9:54	9	63	5:45	NDSU	Barika Kpeenu (#8) 1-yard touchdown run, Griffin Crosa (#39) kick good	3	52
4th	5:00	6	64	3:12	NDSU	Cole Payton (#9) 36-yard touchdown run, Griffin Crosa (#39) kick good	3	59
4th	3:32				NDSU	Fumble recovery returned 5 yards for touchdown by Kelton McCaslin (#92), Griffin Crosa (#39) kick good	3	66
"TOP" = time of possession. For other American football terms, see Glossary of American football.							3	66

==== Montana State (second round) ====
No. 8 North Dakota State Bison (9–3) vs. No. 5 (6) Montana State Bobcats (8–3)

Quarter	1	2	3	4	OT	Total
No. 8 Bison	0	14	7	7	7	35
No. 5 (6) Bobcats	7	7	14	0	6	34

at Bobcat Stadium, Bozeman, MT

- Date: December 2, 2023
- Game time: 2:00 p.m. (CT)
- Game weather: Sunny; 36 °F (2 °C); Wind: W 15 mph
- Game attendance: 17,247
- Referee: Bruce Austin
- TV announcers (ESPN+): Noah Reed, Charles Arbuckle

Statistics	North Dakota State	Montana State
First downs	18	21
Plays–yards	57–374	59–509
Rushes–yards	43–296	40–279
Passing yards	78	230
Passing: comp–att–int	6–14–0	14–19–1
Time of possession	29:43	30:17

Team	Category	Player	Statistics
North Dakota State	Passing	Cam Miller	5/13, 66 yds, TD
North Dakota State	Rushing	TaMerik Williams	11 car, 162 yds, 2 TD
North Dakota State	Receiving	Eli Green	4 rec, 63 yds
Montana State	Passing	Tommy Mellott	13/17, 204 yds, 2 TD, INT
Montana State	Rushing	Tommy Mellott	18 car, 151 yds, 2 TD
Montana State	Receiving	Ty McCullouch	4 rec, 92 yds TD

Scoring summary

Quarter	Time	Drive			Team	Scoring information	Score	
Quarter	Time	Plays	Yards	TOP	Team	Scoring information	NDSU	MTST
1st	1:57	3	63	1:11	MTST	Ty McCullouch (#6) 34-yard touchdown reception from Tommy Mellott (#4), Casey Kautzman (#38) kick good	0	7
2nd	8:52	5	39	2:56	NDSU	Zach Mathis (#0) 3-yard touchdown reception from Cam Miller (#7), Griffin Crosa (#39) kick good	7	7
2nd	4:07	5	93	2:58	NDSU	TaMerik Williams (#22) 44-yard touchdown run, Griffin Crosa (#39) kick good	14	7
2nd	1:05	6	71	3:02	MTST	Tommy Mellott (#4) 6-yard touchdown run, Casey Kautzman (#38) kick good	14	14
3rd	14:50	1	75	0:10	NDSU	TaMerik Williams (#22) 75-yard touchdown run, Griffin Crosa (#39) kick good	21	14
3rd	13:56	2	86	0:48	MTST	Tommy Mellott (#4) 76-yard touchdown run, Casey Kautzman (#38) kick good	21	21
3rd	8:08	8	69	4:11	MTST	Clevan Thomas Jr. (#2) 9-yard touchdown reception from Tommy Mellott (#4), Casey Kautzman (#38) kick good	21	21
4th	2:33	9	89	4:48	NDSU	TK Marshall (#28) 29-yard touchdown run, Griffin Crosa (#39) kick good	28	28
OT		5	25		NDSU	Cam Miller (#7) 3-yard touchdown run, Griffin Crosa (#39) kick good	35	28
OT		1	25		MTST	Scottre Humphrey (#22) 25-yard touchdown run, Casey Kautzman (#38) kick blocked	35	34
"TOP" = time of possession. For other American football terms, see Glossary of American football.							35	34

==== South Dakota (quarterfinal) ====
No. 8 North Dakota State Bison (10–3) vs. No. 3 (3) South Dakota Coyotes (10–2)

Quarter	1	2	3	4	Total
No. 8 Bison	21	14	3	7	45
No. 3 (3) Coyotes	3	0	7	7	17

at DakotaDome, Vermillion, SD

- Date: December 9, 2023
- Game time: 1:30 p.m. (CT)
- Game weather: Indoors; 70 °F (21 °C)
- Game attendance: 9,141
- Referee: Gary Leeper
- TV announcers (ABC): Roy Philpott, Roddy Jones, Lauren Sisler

Statistics	North Dakota State	South Dakota
First downs	22	16
Plays–yards	60–416	52–298
Rushes–yards	45–206	20–52
Passing yards	210	246
Passing: comp–att–int	13–15–0	18–32–3
Time of possession	36:08	23:52

Team	Category	Player	Statistics
North Dakota State	Passing	Cam Miller	13/15, 210 yds, TD
North Dakota State	Rushing	Cole Payton	6 car, 65 yds, 2 TD
North Dakota State	Receiving	Eli Green	5 rec, 116 yds
South Dakota	Passing	Aidan Bouman	13/22, 199 yds, TD, 2 INT
South Dakota	Rushing	Travis Theis	6 car, 32 yds
South Dakota	Receiving	Javion Phelps	3 rec, 81 yds, TD

Scoring summary

Quarter	Time	Drive			Team	Scoring information	Score	
Quarter	Time	Plays	Yards	TOP	Team	Scoring information	NDSU	USD
1st	8:30	10	75	6:30	NDSU	Cam Miller (#7) 9-yard touchdown run, Griffin Crosa (#39) kick good	7	0
1st	5:32	8	60	2:58	USD	32-yard field goal by Will Leyland (#15)	7	3
1st	1:57	7	76	3:30	NDSU	Cole Payton (#9) 43-yard touchdown run, Griffin Crosa (#39) kick good	14	3
1st	0:05				NDSU	Punt returned 82 yards for touchdown by Jayden Price (#23), Griffin Crosa (#39) kick good	21	3
2nd	6:59	9	81	5:27	NDSU	Joe Stoffel (#82) 4-yard touchdown reception from Cam Miller (#7), Griffin Crosa (#39) kick good	28	3
2nd	0:23	7	54	3:35	NDSU	Cole Payton (#9) 17-yard touchdown run, Griffin Crosa (#39) kick good	35	3
3rd	10:07	9	75	4:53	USD	Javion Phelps (#8) 16-yard touchdown reception from Aidan Bouman (#2), Will Leyland (#15) kick good	35	10
3rd	0:50	53	15	9:17	NDSU	40-yard field goal by Griffin Crosa (#39)	38	10
4th	9:12	7	45	4:40	NDSU	TaMerik Williams (#22) 19-yard touchdown run, Griffin Crosa (#39) kick good	45	10
4th	2:58	14	74	6:09	USD	Charles Pierre Jr. (#3) 5-yard touchdown run, Will Leyland (#15) kick good	45	17
"TOP" = time of possession. For other American football terms, see Glossary of American football.							45	17

==== Montana (semifinal) ====
No. 8 North Dakota State Bison (11–3) vs. No. 2 (2) Montana Grizzlies (12–1)

Quarter	1	2	3	4	OT	2OT	Total
No. 8 Bison	3	3	3	7	7	6	29
No. 2 (2) Grizzlies	0	10	0	6	7	8	31

at Washington-Grizzly Stadium, Missoula, MT

- Date: December 16, 2023
- Game time: 3:30 p.m. (CT)
- Game weather: Cloudy; 36 °F (2 °C); No Wind
- Game attendance: 26,544
- Referee: Brian Holland
- TV announcers (ESPN2): Lowell Galindo, Tyoka Jackson, Dawn Davenport

Statistics	North Dakota State	Montana
First downs	19	20
Plays–yards	63–332	69–284
Rushes–yards	40–175	39–124
Passing yards	157	160
Passing: comp–att–int	9–23–0	16–30–0
Time of possession	28:26	31:34

Team	Category	Player	Statistics
North Dakota State	Passing	Cam Miller	9/22, 157 yds, TD
North Dakota State	Rushing	TaMerik Williams	11 car, 52 yds
North Dakota State	Receiving	Eli Green	5 rec, 98 yds, TD
Montana	Passing	Clifton McDowell	16/30, 160 yds, TD
Montana	Rushing	Eli Gillman	12 car, 49 yds, 2 TD
Montana	Receiving	Junior Bergen	6 rec, 59 yds, TD

Scoring summary

Quarter	Time	Drive			Team	Scoring information	Score	
Quarter	Time	Plays	Yards	TOP	Team	Scoring information	NDSU	MONT
1st	11:43	7	63	3:17	NDSU	30-yard field goal by Griffin Crosa (#39)	3	0
2nd	11:55	16	87	7:53	MONT	Eli Gillman (#10) 3-yard touchdown run, Nico Ramos (#83) kick good	3	7
2nd	2:55	8	44	5:05	MONT	46-yard field goal by Grant Glasgow (#97)	3	10
2nd	0:00	13	58	2:55	NDSU	35-yard field goal by Griffin Crosa (#39)	6	10
3rd	5:09	9	36	4:33	NDSU	38-yard field goal by Griffin Crosa (#39)	9	10
4th	11:22				MONT	Punt returned 47 yards for touchdown by Junior Bergen (#5), Nico Ramos (#83) kick missed wide left	9	16
4th	0:51	9	81	4:15	NDSU	Eli Green (#13) 9-yard touchdown reception from Cam Miller (#7), Griffin Crosa (#39) kick good	16	16
OT		1	25		NDSU	Cole Payton (#9) 25-yard touchdown run, Griffin Crosa (#39) kick good	23	16
OT		2	25		MONT	Junior Bergen (#5) 22-yard touchdown reception from Clifton McDowell (#17), Nico Ramos (#83) kick good	23	23
2OT		3	25		MONT	Eli Gillman (#10) 13-yard touchdown run, 2-point pass complete	23	31
2OT		3	25		NDSU	TK Marshall (#28) 2-yard touchdown run, 2-point pass intercepted	29	31
"TOP" = time of possession. For other American football terms, see Glossary of American football.							29	31

== Roster ==
2023 North Dakota State Bison football team roster
Players
Coaches
Offense

Pos.	#	Name	Class
WR	0	Zach Mathis	Sr
WR	1	Braylon Henderson	Sr
WR	2	Kellen Entz	Fr
WR	3	Raja Nelson	Sr
RB	4	Owen Johnson	So
WR	5	Bryce Lance	So
WR	6	Tyler Terhark	Jr
QB	7	Cam Miller	Sr
RB	8	Barika Kpeenu	So
QB	9	Cole Payton	So
QB	10	Trey Drake	Fr
QB	12	Nathan Hayes	Fr
WR	13	Eli Green	So
WR	15	Mekhi Collins	Fr
QB	16	Peter Anderson	So
WR	17	Carson Hegerle	Fr
WR	19	Jake Lippe	Sr
RB	22	TaMerik Williams	Sr
RB	25	CharMar Brown	Fr
RB	28	TK Marshall	Sr
FB	30	Josiah Azure	Fr
RB	32	Kelly Watson	Fr
FB	33	Logan Hofstedt	Sr
RB	34	Jonathan Harvey	Fr
TE	40	Kaden Zenzen	Fr
TE	43	Collin Knorr	Fr
TE	44	Luke Kokat	Fr
RB	45	Brady Wavrunek	Fr
FB	46	Truman Werremeyer	So
TE	47	Dylan Klancher	Fr
FB	49	Hunter Brozio	Sr
OL	54	AJ Heins	Fr
G	59	Hayden Johnston	Jr
OL	60	Isaac Zatechka	So
OL	61	Austin Schultz	Fr
OL	62	Griffin Empey	Fr
G	63	Jake Kubas	Sr
OL	65	Bryce Friday	Jr
OL	66	Jack Liwienski	Fr
OL	67	Kaden Chadwick	Fr
OL	68	Nate Schneckloth	Fr
OL	69	Devin Lockerby	Fr
OL	70	Beau Johnson	Fr
C	72	Jalen Sundell	Sr
OT	73	Mason Miller	Sr
G	74	Grey Zabel	Sr
OT	75	Trevor Fiecko	So
OT	76	Hunter Poncius	Sr
C	77	Brandon Westberg	Sr
OT	78	Jake Rock	Sr
WR	80	John Gores	Fr
WR	81	Carter Kriewaldt	Fr
TE	82	Joe Stoffel	Sr
WR	83	Giancarlo Volpentesta	Sr
WR	84	Chris Harris	So
TE	85	Jacob Streit	Sr
WR	86	Cedric Wall	Fr
TE	87	Nate Forystek	Fr
TE	88	Carson Williams	So
TE	89	Finn Diggins	So

Defense

Pos.	#	Name	Class
DB	10	Marcus Sheppard	Sr
LB	11	Oscar Benson	Jr
DB	13	Najee Nelson	Fr
LB	14	Enock Sibomana	So
DB	17	Jailen Duffie	Fr
CB	18	Jaquise Alexander	Fr
DB	19	Reese Sheldon	Fr
LB	20	Julian Wlodarczyk	Sr
CB	21	Reggie King	So
S	22	Hudson Artz	Fr
CB	23	Jayden Price	Sr
CB	24	Jenaro Ocama	Sr
LB	26	Marcus Gulley	Jr
S	27	Ryan Jones	So
DB	28	Noah Taylor	Fr
DB	29	Darius Givance	Fr
CB	30	Chase Nixon	Jr
LB	31	Cole Wisniewski	Sr
S	32	Ty Satter	Jr
DB	33	Termaine Turner	Fr
CB	34	Kegan Huber	Fr
S	35	Sam Jung	Sr
LB	36	Nick Kubitz	Sr
DB	37	Isaac Hyland	Fr
CB	38	Alex Oechsner	So
LB	39	Cade Powers	Sr
LB	41	Josh Hendricks	Fr
LB	42	Jaiden Pickett	Fr
LB	43	Logan Kopp	So
LB	44	Brit Senftner	Fr
DB	45	Jaylin Crumby	Fr
LB	46	Oliver Lucht	Fr
LB	47	Luke Weerts	Sr
DT	50	Kody Huisman	So
LB	51	Austin Altepeter	Fr
LB	52	Nathaniel Staehling	Fr
DT	53	Eli Mostaert	Sr
DE	54	Jake Kava	Sr
DE	55	Kole Menz	So
DE	56	Loshiaka Roques	Jr
DE	57	Allante Burley	Fr
DT	58	Javier Derritt	Sr
LB	59	Dylan Taves	Sr
DE	63	Brennan Palmer	Fr
DT	64	Jaxon Duttenhefer	So
DT	71	Keenan Wilson	Fr
DE	72	Victor Isele	Fr
DE	90	Matt Weerts	So
DT	91	Will Mostaert	Sr
DE	92	Kelton McCaslin	Fr
DE	93	Toby Anene	Fr
DT	94	Logan Larson	Fr
DE	95	Dylan Hendricks	Sr
DE	96	Abraham Myers	Fr
DE	97	Gannon Williams	Fr
DT	98	Josh Magin	Fr
DE	99	Hunter Zenzen	Jr

Special teams

Pos.	#	Name	Class
K	35	Eli Ozick	Fr
K	37	Drew Klein	Fr
K	39	Griffin Crosa	Sr
P	41	Kaedin Steindorf	Jr
LS	48	Caleb Bowers	Fr

Head coach

- Matt Entz (head coach)

Coordinators/assistant coaches

- Randy Hedberg (Associate HC / passing game coordinator / quarterbacks)
- Tyler Roehl (offensive coordinator / tight ends / fullbacks)
- Jason Petrino (defensive coordinator / safeties)
- Grant Olson (special teams coordinator / linebackers)
- Joe Beshorner (running backs)
- Steve Crutchley (wide receivers)
- Nick Goeser (defensive line)
- Dan Larson (offensive line)
- Jeff Phelps (defensive tackles)
- Tucker Meyer (outside linebackers)
- Lewis Walker (cornerbacks)
- Seth Hestness (offensive line assistant)
- Bobby Mornhinweg (offensive analyst)

Legend

- (C) Team captain
- (S) Suspended
- (I) Ineligible
- Injured
- Redshirt

Roster
Last update: August 3, 2023

== Rankings ==
Ranking movements Legend: ██ Increase in ranking ██ Decrease in ranking ( ) = First-place votes
	Week													
Poll	Pre	1	2	3	4	5	6	7	8	9	10	11	12	Final
STATS	2	2 (1)	2 (3)	2 (3)	2 (2)	7	6	14	12	11	12	9	8	3
Coaches	2 (1)	2	2	2	2	8	7	15	11	10	13	9	7	3
