= 2023 Murray State Racers football team =

American college football season

2023 Murray State Racers football
- Conference: Missouri Valley Football Conference
- Record: 2–9 (1–7 MVFC)
- Head coach: Dean Hood (4th season)
- Offensive coordinator: Ben Hodges (4th season)
- Defensive coordinator: Dillon Sanders (4th season)
- Home stadium: Roy Stewart Stadium

2023 Missouri Valley Football Conference standings
	Conf.			Overall
Team	W		L	W		L
No. 1 South Dakota State $^	8	–	0	15	–	0
No. 4 South Dakota ^	7	–	1	10	–	3
No. 3 North Dakota State ^	5	–	3	11	–	4
No. 19 Youngstown State ^	5	–	3	8	–	5
No. 16 North Dakota ^	5	–	3	7	–	5
Northern Iowa	5	–	3	6	–	5
No. 12 Southern Illinois ^	4	–	4	8	–	5
Illinois State	4	–	4	6	–	5
Missouri State	3	–	5	4	–	7
Murray State	1	–	7	2	–	9
Indiana State	1	–	7	1	–	10
Western Illinois	0	–	8	0	–	11
$ – Conference champion; ^ – FCS playoff participant; Rankings from STATS Poll

The 2023 Murray State Racers football team represented Murray State University as a member of the Missouri Valley Football Conference (MVFC) during the 2023 NCAA Division I FCS football season. It was the team's first season in the MVFC. The Racers were led by fourth-year head coach Dean Hood and played home games at Roy Stewart Stadium in Murray, Kentucky.

== Schedule ==
Date	Time	Opponent	Site	TV	Result	Attendance
September 2	6:00 p.m.	Presbyterian*	Roy Stewart Stadium; Murray, KY	ESPN+	W 41–10	6,953
September 7	6:30 p.m.	at Louisville*	L&N Stadium; Louisville, KY	ACCN	L 0–56	45,273
September 16	6:00 p.m.	at Middle Tennessee*	Johnny "Red" Floyd Stadium; Murfreesboro, TN	ESPN+	L 14–35	16,605
September 30	6:00 p.m.	Indiana State	Roy Stewart Stadium; Murray, KY	ESPN+	W 30–28	13,213
October 7	2:00 p.m.	at No. 15 South Dakota	DakotaDome; Vermillion, SD	ESPN+	L 7–38	7,907
October 14	2:00 p.m.	No. 13 Southern Illinois^{†}	Roy Stewart Stadium; Murray, KY	ESPN+	L 6–27	15,868
October 21	2:00 p.m.	at Missouri State	Robert W. Plaster Stadium; Springfield, MO	ESPN+	L 24–28	11,386
October 28	2:30 p.m.	at No. 12 North Dakota State	Fargodome; Fargo, ND	ESPN+	L 6–38	13,876
November 4	1:00 p.m.	No. 13 North Dakota	Roy Stewart Stadium; Murray, KY	ESPN+	L 31–45	6,217
November 11	11:00 a.m.	at Illinois State	Hancock Stadium; Normal, IL	ESPN+	L 7–44	5,623
November 18	1:00 p.m.	No. 25 Youngstown State	Roy Stewart Stadium; Murray, KY	ESPN+	L 17–34	5,957
*Non-conference game; ^{†}Homecoming; Rankings from STATS Poll released prior to the game; All times are in Central time

== Game summaries ==
=== at Louisville (FBS) ===
Louisville Cardinals (1–0) vs. Murray State Racers (1–0) – Game summary

Quarter	1	2	3	4	Total
Murray State	0	0	0	0	0
Louisville	7	21	14	14	56

at L&N Stadium • Louisville, Kentucky

- Date: September 7
- Game time: 7:30 p.m. EST
- Game weather: Sunny • Temperature: 73 °F (23 °C) • Wind: 7 mph NW
- Game attendance: 45,273
- Referee: Maurice Woods
- TV announcers (ACC Network): Chris Cotter (play-by-play), Mark Herzlich (analyst) and Sherree Burruss (sideline)

Game information

First quarter

- 10:06 LOU – Jamari Thrash 12-yard run (Brock Travelstead kick) – 7–0 Louisville, Drive: 6 plays, 76 yards, 2:58

Second quarter

- 14:38 LOU – Isaac Guerendo 1-yard run (Brock Travelstead kick) – 14–0 Louisville, Drive: 9 plays, 85 yards, 3:25
- 6:37 LOU – Jamari Thrash 73-yard pass from Jack Plummer (Brock Travelstead kick) – 21–0 Louisville, Drive: 2 plays, 69 yards, 0:44
- 2:37 LOU – Jawhar Jordan 72-yard run (Brock Travelstead kick) – 28–0 Louisville, Drive: 2 plays, 80 yards, 0:33

Third quarter

- 7:08 LOU – Jawhar Jordan 1-yard run (Brock Travelstead kick) – 35–0 Louisville, Drive: 6 plays, 59 yards, 2:30
- 0:58 LOU – Ahmari Higgins-Bruce 6-yard run (Nick Lopez kick) – 42–0 Louisville, Drive: 9 plays, 54 yards, 4:11

Fourth quarter

- 14:55 LOU – Keyjuan Brown 4-yard run (Brock Travelstead kick) – 49–0 Louisville, Drive: 3 plays, 36 yards, 0:57
- 9:44 LOU – Joey Gatewood 34-yard pass from Harrison Bailey (Nick Lopez kick) – 56–0 Louisville, Drive: 10 plays, 74 yards, 3:45

Statistics	MUR	LOU
First downs	8	29
Plays–yards	54–166	78–690
Rushes–yards	32–94	44–344
Passing yards	72	346
Passing: comp–att–int	8–22–1	25–34–2
Turnovers		
Time of possession	28:53	31:07

Team	Category	Player	Statistics
Murray State	Passing	DJ Williams	7/16, 68 yards
Murray State	Rushing	Kywon Morgan	11 carries, 34 yards
Murray State	Receiving	Jacob Bell	4 receptions, 26 yards
Louisville	Passing	Jack Plummer	16/22, 247 yards, 1 TD, 2 INT
Louisville	Rushing	Jawhar Jordan	7 carries, 135 yards, 2 TD
Louisville	Receiving	Jamari Thrash	3 receptions, 82 yards, 1 TD

=== at No. 12 North Dakota State ===
Murray State Racers (2–5) vs No. 12 North Dakota State Bison (5–2)

Quarter	1	2	3	4	Total
Racers	0	3	3	0	6
No. 12 Bison	21	7	7	3	38

at Fargodome, Fargo, ND

- Date: October 28, 2023
- Game time: 2:30 p.m. (CT)
- Game weather: Indoors; 70 °F (21 °C)
- Game attendance: 13,876
- Referee: Jason Perkins
- TV: ESPN+

Statistics	Murray State	North Dakota State
First downs	11	19
Plays–yards	55–164	62–377
Rushes–yards	28–56	34–175
Passing yards	108	202
Passing: comp–att–int	15–27–1	20–28–0
Turnovers		
Time of possession	28:28	31:32

Team	Category	Player	Statistics
Murray State	Passing	DJ Williams	15/26, 108 yds, INT
Murray State	Rushing	Jawaun Northington	9 car, 37 yds
Murray State	Receiving	Michael Fox	4 rec, 27 yds
North Dakota State	Passing	Cam Miller	18/24, 192 yds, 2 TD
North Dakota State	Rushing	Cam Miller	6 car, 55 yds, 2 TD
North Dakota State	Receiving	Zach Mathis	8 rec, 74 yds, TD

Scoring summary

Quarter	Time	Drive			Team	Scoring information	Score	
Quarter	Time	Plays	Yards	TOP	Team	Scoring information	MUST	NDSU
1st	12:14	5	65	2:46	NDSU	Cam Miller (#7) 15-yard touchdown run, Griffin Crosa (#39) kick good	0	7
1st	5:35	10	77	5:04	NDSU	Cam Miller (#7) 9-yard touchdown run, Griffin Crosa (#39) kick good	0	14
1st	3:11	4	29	2:19	NDSU	Braylon Henderson (#1) 8-yard touchdown reception from Cam Miller (#7), Griffin Crosa (#39) kick good	0	21
2nd	6:23	8	57	5:13	NDSU	Zach Mathis (#0) 15-yard touchdown reception from Cam Miller (#7), Griffin Crosa (#39) kick good	0	28
2nd	1:49	11	40	4:34	MUST	53-yard field goal by James London (#83)	3	28
3rd	13:07				NDSU	Punt returned 66 yards for touchdown by Jayden Price (#23), Griffin Crosa (#39) kick good	3	35
3rd	5:49	13	63	7:10	MUST	39-yard field goal by Matt Maldonado (#37)	6	35
4th	4:05	4	-2	1:21	NDSU	36-yard field goal by Griffin Crosa (#39)	6	38
"TOP" = time of possession. For other American football terms, see Glossary of American football.							6	38
