= 2023 Northern Iowa Panthers football team =

American college football season

2023 Northern Iowa Panthers football
- Conference: Missouri Valley Football Conference
- Record: 6–5 (5–3 MVFC)
- Head coach: Mark Farley (23rd season)
- Co-offensive coordinators: Ryan Clanton (2nd season); Bodie Reeder (2nd season)
- Defensive coordinator: Jeremiah Johnson (10th season)
- Home stadium: UNI-Dome

2023 Missouri Valley Football Conference standings
| | Conf. | | | Overall |
| Team | W | | L | W | | L |
|---|---|---|---|---|---|---|
| No. 1 South Dakota State $^ | 8 | – | 0 | 15 | – | 0 |
| No. 4 South Dakota ^ | 7 | – | 1 | 10 | – | 3 |
| No. 3 North Dakota State ^ | 5 | – | 3 | 11 | – | 4 |
| No. 19 Youngstown State ^ | 5 | – | 3 | 8 | – | 5 |
| No. 16 North Dakota ^ | 5 | – | 3 | 7 | – | 5 |
| Northern Iowa | 5 | – | 3 | 6 | – | 5 |
| No. 12 Southern Illinois ^ | 4 | – | 4 | 8 | – | 5 |
| Illinois State | 4 | – | 4 | 6 | – | 5 |
| Missouri State | 3 | – | 5 | 4 | – | 7 |
| Murray State | 1 | – | 7 | 2 | – | 9 |
| Indiana State | 1 | – | 7 | 1 | – | 10 |
| Western Illinois | 0 | – | 8 | 0 | – | 11 |
$ – Conference champion; ^ – FCS playoff participant; Rankings from STATS Poll

The 2023 Northern Iowa Panthers football team represented the University of Northern Iowa as a member of the Missouri Valley Football Conference (MVFC) during the 2023 NCAA Division I FCS football season. Led by 23rd-year head coach Mark Farley, the Panthers compiled an overall record of 6–5 with a mark of 5–3 in conference play, placing in a four-way tie for third in the MVFC. The team played home games at the UNI-Dome in Cedar Falls, Iowa.

== Schedule ==
| Date | Time | Opponent | Rank | Site | TV | Result | Attendance |
|---|---|---|---|---|---|---|---|
| September 2 | 1:00 p.m. | at Iowa State* | No. 23 | Jack Trice Stadium; Ames, IA | ESPN+ | L 9–30 | 58,248 |
| September 9 | 4:00 p.m. | No. 12 Weber State* | No. 21 | UNI-Dome; Cedar Falls, IA | ESPN+ | L 17–34 | 7,967 |
| September 16 | 5:00 p.m. | at Idaho State* | | Holt Arena; Pocatello, ID | ESPN+ | W 41–17 | N/A |
| September 30 | 1:00 p.m. | No. 23 Youngstown State | | UNI-Dome; Cedar Falls, IA | ESPN+ | W 44–41 | 10,346 |
| October 7 | 6:00 p.m. | at Indiana State | | Memorial Stadium; Terre Haute, IN | ESPN+ | W 27–20 | 3,228 |
| October 14 | 2:00 p.m. | at No. 1 South Dakota State | | Dana J. Dykhouse Stadium; Brookings, SD | ESPN+ | L 6–41 | 19,357 |
| October 21 | 4:00 p.m. | No. 11 North Dakota^{†} | | UNI-Dome; Cedar Falls, IA | ESPN3 | W 27–0 | 10,677 |
| October 28 | 12:00 p.m. | at Illinois State | No. 23 | Hancock Stadium; Normal, IL | ESPN+ | W 24–21 | N/A |
| November 4 | 1:00 p.m. | Western Illinois | No. 18 | UNI-Dome; Cedar Falls, IA | ESPN+ | W 50–6 | 8,051 |
| November 11 | 2:00 p.m. | at Missouri State | No. 15 | Robert W. Plaster Stadium; Springfield, MO | ESPN+ | L 16–35 | 6,898 |
| November 18 | 4:00 p.m. | No. 9 North Dakota State | No. 22 | UNI-Dome; Cedar Falls, IA | ESPN+ | L 27–48 | 9,852 |
*Non-conference game; ^{†}Homecoming; Rankings from STATS Poll released prior to the game; All times are in Central time

== Game summaries ==
=== at Iowa State ===
Northern Iowa Panthers (0–0) vs. Iowa State Cyclones (0–0)

| Quarter | 1 | 2 | 3 | 4 | Total |
|---|---|---|---|---|---|
| Northern Iowa | 0 | 0 | 3 | 6 | 9 |
| Iowa State | 14 | 9 | 7 | 0 | 30 |

at Jack Trice Stadium • Ames, IA

- Date: Saturday, September 2, 2023
- Game time: 1:00 p.m. CDT
- Game weather: sunny, SW 10 MPH • Temperature: 89°F
- Game attendance: 58,248
- Referee: Kevin Boitmann
- TV announcers (ESPN+): Shawn Kenney, Todd Doxzon

Game information

First Quarter

- (12:45) ISU – Cooper, Jeremiah 58 yd interception (Contreraz, Chase kick) (ISU 7–0)
- (1:21) ISU – Becht, Rocco 1 yd run (Contreraz, Chase kick) (Drive: 7 plays, 21 yards, 3:48; ISU 14–0)

Second Quarter

- (0:48) ISU – Moore, Tyler 14 yd pass from Becht, Rocco (PAT Failed) (Drive: 6 plays, 71 yards, 2:51; ISU 20–0)
- (07:54) ISU – Contreraz, Chase 56 yd field goal (Drive: 1 plays, - yards, 0:04; ISU 23–0)

Third Quarter

- (13:08) ISU – Brahmer, Benjamin 36 yd pass from Becht, Rocco (Contreraz, Chase kick) (Drive: 4 plays, 87 yards, 1:48; ISU 30–0)
- (08:03) UNI - Cook, Matthew 31 yd field goal (Drive: 12 plays, 61 yards, 5:05; ISU 30–3)

Fourth Quarter

- (11:30) UNI - Hutson, Desmond 3 yd pass from Day, Theo (2 Pt Conversion Failed ) (Drive: 5 plays, 57 yards, 1:55; ISU 30–9)

| Statistics | UNI | ISU |
|---|---|---|
| First downs | 19 | 11 |
| Total yards | 279 | 250 |
| Rushes/yards | 37/106 | 27/134 |
| Passing yards | 173 | 116 |
| Passing: Comp–Att–Int | 17–35–2 | 14–18–0 |
| Turnovers | 2 | 0 |
| Time of possession | 34:24 | 25:36 |

| Team | Category | Player | Statistics |
|---|---|---|---|
| UNI | Passing | Theo Day | 16–34, 164 YDS, 1 TD, 2 INT |
| UNI | Rushing | Tye Edwards | 16 CAR, 72 YDS |
| UNI | Receiving | Logan Wolf | 3 REC, 40 YDS |
| Iowa State | Passing | Rocco Becht | 10–13, 113 yards, 2 TD |
| Iowa State | Rushing | Cartevious Norton | 11 CAR, 49 YDS |
| Iowa State | Receiving | Benjamin Brahmer | 1 REC, 36 YDS, TD |

=== No. 9 North Dakota State ===
No. 9 North Dakota State Bison (7–3) vs. No. 22 Northern Iowa Panthers (6–4)

| Quarter | 1 | 2 | 3 | 4 | Total |
|---|---|---|---|---|---|
| No. 9 Bison | 14 | 13 | 7 | 14 | 48 |
| No. 22 Panthers | 3 | 7 | 10 | 7 | 27 |

at UNI-Dome, Cedar Falls, IA

- Date: November 18, 2023
- Game time: 4:00 p.m. (CT)
- Game weather: Indoors; 70 °F (21 °C)
- Game attendance: 9,852
- Referee: Rick Warne
- TV: ESPN+

| Statistics | North Dakota State | Northern Iowa |
|---|---|---|
| First downs | 18 | 25 |
| Plays–yards | 58–399 | 67–407 |
| Rushes–yards | 36–161 | 29–65 |
| Passing yards | 238 | 342 |
| Passing: comp–att–int | 17–22–0 | 24–38–4 |
| Time of possession | 30:33 | 28:15 |

| Team | Category | Player | Statistics |
|---|---|---|---|
| North Dakota State | Passing | Cam Miller | 17/22, 238 yds, 2 TD |
| North Dakota State | Rushing | Cole Payton | 4 car, 79 yds, 2 TD |
| North Dakota State | Receiving | RaJa Nelson | 6 rec, 113 yds, TD |
| Northern Iowa | Passing | Theo Day | 24/38, 342 yds, 2 TD, 4 INT |
| Northern Iowa | Rushing | Tyjahree Edwards | 12 car, 67 yds, TD |
| Northern Iowa | Receiving | Sam Schnee | 8 rec, 164 yds, TD |

Scoring summary

| Quarter | Time | Drive | | | Team | Scoring information | Score | |
| Quarter | Time | Plays | Yards | TOP | Team | Scoring information | NDSU | UNI |
|---|---|---|---|---|---|---|---|---|
| 1st | 11:30 | 7 | 68 | 3:23 | NDSU | Eli Green (#13) 36-yard touchdown reception from Cam Miller (#7), Griffin Crosa (#39) kick good | 7 | 0 |
| 1st | 7:05 | 12 | 62 | 4:19 | UNI | 26-yard field goal by Matthew Cook (#97) | 7 | 3 |
| 1st | 1:12 | 10 | 75 | 5:53 | NDSU | Cam Miller (#7) 1-yard touchdown run, Griffin Crosa (#39) kick good | 14 | 3 |
| 2nd | 13:51 | 4 | 30 | 1:03 | NDSU | RaJa Nelson (#3) 15-yard touchdown reception from Cam Miller (#7), Griffin Crosa (#39) kick good | 21 | 3 |
| 2nd | 11:28 | 5 | 84 | 2:17 | UNI | Tyjahree Edwards (#2) 40-yard touchdown run, Matthew Cook (#97) kick good | 21 | 10 |
| 2nd | 7:11 | 4 | 1 | 0:40 | NDSU | 34-yard field goal by Griffin Crosa (#39) | 24 | 10 |
| 2nd | 0:13 | 13 | 32 | 6:15 | NDSU | 37-yard field goal by Griffin Crosa (#39) | 27 | 10 |
| 3rd | 9:30 | 10 | 61 | 5:26 | UNI | 30-yard field goal by Matthew Cook (#97) | 27 | 13 |
| 3rd | 5:48 | 1 | 65 | 0:11 | NDSU | Cole Payton (#9) 65-yard touchdown run, Griffin Crosa (#39) kick good | 34 | 13 |
| 3rd | 0:56 | 10 | 75 | 4:52 | UNI | Sam Schnee (#23) 11-yard touchdown reception from Theo Day (#12), Matthew Cook (#97) kick good | 34 | 20 |
| 4th | 12:47 | 7 | 75 | 3:09 | NDSU | Cole Payton (#9) 23-yard touchdown run, Griffin Crosa (#39) kick good | 41 | 20 |
| 4th | 11:59 | | | | NDSU | Interception returned 75 yards for touchdown by Cole Wisniewski (#31), Griffin Crosa (#39) kick good | 48 | 20 |
| 4th | 9:11 | 9 | 65 | 2:48 | UNI | Amauri Pesek-Hickson (#5) 15-yard touchdown reception from Theo Day (#12), Matthew Cook (#97) kick good | 48 | 27 |
| "TOP" = time of possession. For other American football terms, see Glossary of American football. | | | | | | | 48 | 27 |
