= 2023 Illinois State Redbirds football team =

American college football season

2023 Illinois State Redbirds football
- Conference: Missouri Valley Football Conference
- Record: 6–5 (4–4 MVFC)
- Head coach: Brock Spack (15th season)
- Offensive coordinator: Tony Petersen (2nd season)
- Defensive coordinator: Travis Niekamp (6th season)
- Home stadium: Hancock Stadium

2023 Missouri Valley Football Conference standings
	Conf.			Overall
Team	W		L	W		L
No. 1 South Dakota State $^	8	–	0	15	–	0
No. 4 South Dakota ^	7	–	1	10	–	3
No. 3 North Dakota State ^	5	–	3	11	–	4
No. 19 Youngstown State ^	5	–	3	8	–	5
No. 16 North Dakota ^	5	–	3	7	–	5
Northern Iowa	5	–	3	6	–	5
No. 12 Southern Illinois ^	4	–	4	8	–	5
Illinois State	4	–	4	6	–	5
Missouri State	3	–	5	4	–	7
Murray State	1	–	7	2	–	9
Indiana State	1	–	7	1	–	10
Western Illinois	0	–	8	0	–	11
$ – Conference champion; ^ – FCS playoff participant; Rankings from STATS Poll

Illinois State Redbird Wordmark

The 2023 Illinois State Redbirds football team represented Illinois State University as a member of the Missouri Valley Football Conference (MVFC) during the 2023 NCAA Division I FCS football season. They were led by 15th-year head coach Brock Spack. Illinois State played home games at Hancock Stadium in Normal, Illinois.

== Schedule ==
Date	Time	Opponent	Site	TV	Result	Attendance
September 2	12:00 p.m.	Dayton*	Hancock Stadium; Normal, IL	Marquee/ESPN+	W 41–0	6,740
September 9	3:00 p.m.	at Western Illinois	Hanson Field; Macomb, IL	ESPN+	W 34–18	3,648
September 16	2:00 p.m.	at Eastern Illinois*	O'Brien Field; Charleston, IL (Mid-America Classic)	ESPN+	L 13–14	6,602
September 23	12:00 p.m.	Lindenwood*	Hancock Stadium; Normal, IL	ESPN+	W 48–17	13,391
October 7	6:00 p.m.	No. 1 South Dakota State	Hancock Stadium; Normal, IL	Marquee/ESPN+	L 21–40	8,272
October 14	2:00 p.m.	Indiana State^{†}	Hancock Stadium; Normal, IL	Marquee/ESPN+	W 44–7	9,135
October 21	1:00 p.m.	No. 25 Youngstown State	Stambaugh Stadium; Youngstown, OH	ESPN+	L 38–41	10,022
October 28	12:00 p.m.	No. 23 Northern Iowa	Hancock Stadium; Normal, IL	ESPN+	L 21–24	N/A
November 4	2:00 p.m.	at Missouri State	Robert W. Plaster Stadium; Springfield, MO	ESPN+	W 36–35	7,700
November 11	11:00 a.m.	Murray State	Hancock Stadium; Normal, IL	Marquee/ESPN+	W 44–7	5,623
November 18	1:00 p.m.	at No. 13 North Dakota	Alerus Center; Grand Forks, ND	ESPN+	L 21–22	9,238
*Non-conference game; ^{†}Homecoming; Rankings from STATS Poll released prior to the game; All times are in Central time

== Game summaries ==
=== No. 1 South Dakota State ===
No. 1 South Dakota State at Illinois State

Team	1	2	3	4	Total
• No. 1 Jackrabbits	20	14	0	6	40
Redbirds	0	14	7	0	21

- Date: October 7
- Location:
  Hancock Stadium
  Normal, IL
- Game start: 6:05 p.m. CDT
- Elapsed time: 2:54
- Game attendance: 8,272
- Game weather: 56 °F (13 °C), Cloudy, Wind SW 9 mph (14 km/h)
- Referee: Gregory Gompf
- Television network: ESPN+

Statistics	SDSU	ISU
First downs	25	18
Total yards	547	293
Rushing yards	374	122
Passing yards	173	171
Turnovers	1	2
Time of possession	35:45	24:15

Team	Category	Player	Statistics
South Dakota State	Passing	Mark Gronowski	11/17, 171 yards, 3 TD
South Dakota State	Rushing	Isaiah Davis	20 carries, 197 yards, 2 TD
South Dakota State	Receiving	Jaxon Janke	5 receptions, 88 yards, TD
Illinois State	Passing	Zack Annexstad	26/33, 162 yards, TD
Illinois State	Rushing	Mason Blakemore	6 carries, 57 yards, TD
Illinois State	Receiving	Daniel Sobkowicz	7 receptions, 70 yards, TD
