= 2023 Western Illinois Leathernecks football team =

American college football season

2023 Western Illinois Leathernecks football
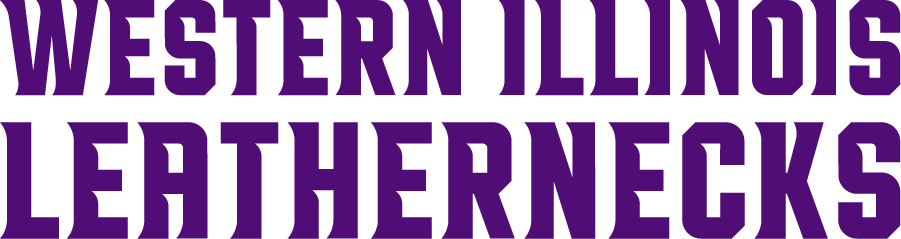
- Conference: Missouri Valley Football Conference
- Record: 0–11 (0–8 MVFC)
- Head coach: Myers Hendrickson (2nd season)
- Offensive coordinator: Pat Denecke (1st season)
- Defensive coordinator: Todd Drury (2nd season)
- Home stadium: Hanson Field

2023 Missouri Valley Football Conference standings
	Conf.			Overall
Team	W		L	W		L
No. 1 South Dakota State $^	8	–	0	15	–	0
No. 4 South Dakota ^	7	–	1	10	–	3
No. 3 North Dakota State ^	5	–	3	11	–	4
No. 19 Youngstown State ^	5	–	3	8	–	5
No. 16 North Dakota ^	5	–	3	7	–	5
Northern Iowa	5	–	3	6	–	5
No. 12 Southern Illinois ^	4	–	4	8	–	5
Illinois State	4	–	4	6	–	5
Missouri State	3	–	5	4	–	7
Murray State	1	–	7	2	–	9
Indiana State	1	–	7	1	–	10
Western Illinois	0	–	8	0	–	11
$ – Conference champion; ^ – FCS playoff participant; Rankings from STATS Poll

The 2023 Western Illinois Leathernecks football team represented Western Illinois University as a member of the Missouri Valley Football Conference (MVFC) during the 2023 NCAA Division I FCS football season. Led by Myers Hendrickson in his second and final season as head coach, the Leathernecks compiled an overall record of 0–11 with a mark of 0–8 in conference play, placing last out of 12 teams in the MVFC. Western Illinois played home games at Hanson Field in Macomb, Illinois.

This was the final season for the Leathernecks in the MVFC before moving to the Ohio Valley Conference (OVC) for the 2024 season.

== Schedule ==
Date	Time	Opponent	Site	TV	Result	Attendance
September 2	8:00 p.m.	at New Mexico State*	Aggie Memorial Stadium; Las Cruces, NM	ESPN+	L 21–58	17,843
September 9	3:00 p.m.	Illinois State	Hanson Field; Macomb, IL	ESPN+	L 18–34	3,648
September 16	6:00 p.m.	Lindenwood*	Hanson Field; Macomb, IL	ESPN+	L 40–43	3,548
September 23	7:00 p.m.	at Southern Utah*	Eccles Coliseum; Cedar City, UT	ESPN+	L 17–37	6,504
October 7	1:00 p.m.	at No. 16 North Dakota	Alerus Center; Grand Forks, ND	ESPN+	L 10–49	9,758
October 14	3:00 p.m.	Missouri State^{†}	Hanson Field; Macomb, IL	ESPN+	L 7–48	2,809
October 21	2:30 p.m.	at No. 14 North Dakota State	Fargodome; Fargo, ND	ESPN+	L 7–52	14,255
October 28	3:00 p.m.	No. 11 Southern Illinois	Hanson Field; Macomb, IL	ESPN+	L 0–63	2,636
November 4	1:00 p.m.	at No. 18 Northern Iowa	UNI-Dome; Cedar Falls, IA	ESPN+	L 6–50	8,051
November 11	12:00 p.m.	at Indiana State	Memorial Stadium; Terre Haute, IN	ESPN+	L 6–27	3,151
November 18	1:00 p.m.	No. 5 South Dakota	Hanson Field; Macomb, IL	ESPN+	L 6–48	1,935
*Non-conference game; ^{†}Homecoming; Rankings from STATS Poll released prior to the game; All times are in Central time

== Game summaries ==
=== at New Mexico State ===
Western Illinois Leathernecks at New Mexico State Aggies – Game summary

Quarter	1	2	3	4	Total
Leathernecks	0	14	7	0	21
Aggies	6	14	17	21	58

at Aggie Memorial Stadium, Las Cruces, New Mexico

- Date: September 2
- Game time: 7:00 p.m. MDT
- Game weather: Sunny, 93 °F (34 °C)
- Game attendance: 17,943
- Referee: Rodney Burnette
- TV announcers (ESPN+): Adam Young, Danny Knee, and Tatiana Favela
- Box score, Recap

Game information
First quarter
- NMSU – Star Thomas 20-yard run (kick failed), 11:29. Aggies 6–0. Drive: 7 plays, 70 yards, 3:24.

Second quarter

- NMSU – Eli Stowers 4-yard run (Ethan Albertson kick), 14:53. Aggies 13–0. Drive: 11 plays, 81 yards, 5:15.
- WIU – Jaylin Jackson 5-yard pass from Matt Morrissey (Owen Valek kick), 8:42. Aggies 13–7. Drive: 12 plays, 75 yards, 6:11.
- NMSU – Monte Walkins 5-yard run (Ethan Albertson kick), 2:23. Aggies 20–7. Drive: 11 plays, 78 yards, 6:11.
- WIU – Ludovick Choquette 21-yard run (Owen Valek kick), 0:05. Aggies 20–14. Drive: 10 plays, 75 yards, 2:18.

Third quarter

- NMSU – Ethan Albertson 37-yard field goal, 11:34. Aggies 23–14. Drive: 7 plays, 41 yards, 2:21.
- NMSU – Bryce Childress 75-yard pass from Diego Pavia (Ethan Albertson kick), 7:58. Aggies 30–14. Drive: 2 plays, 82 yards, 0:33.
- NMSU – Jonathan Brady 80-yard pass from Diego Pavia (Ethan Albertson kick), 4:38. Aggies 37–14. Drive: 1 play, 80 yards, 0:12.
- WIU – Donald McKinney 26-yard pass from Matt Morrissey (Owen Valek kick), 2:38. Aggies 37–21. Drive: 4 plays, 75 yards, 2:00.

Fourth quarter

- NMSU – Star Thomas 25-yard run (Ethan Albertson kick), 11:18. Aggies 44–21. Drive: 11 plays, 75 yards, 6:20.
- NMSU – Jordan Parker 63-yard pass from Eli Stowers (Ethan Albertson kick), 8:49. Aggies 51–21. Drive: 2 plays, 65 yards, 0:51.
- NMSU – Makhilyn Young 3-yard run (Ethan Albertson kick), 4:13. Aggies 58–21. Drive: 5 plays, 61 yards, 2:45.

Statistics	WIU	NMSU
First downs	17	26
Total yards	278	650
Rushing yards	36	270
Passing yards	242	380
Turnovers	0	0
Time of possession	27:05	32:55

Team	Category	Player	Statistics
Western Illinois	Passing	Matt Morrissey	17/31, 242 yards, 2 TD
Western Illinois	Rushing	Ludovick Choquette	11 rushes, 37 yards, TD
Western Illinois	Receiving	Seth Glatz	3 receptions, 73 yards
New Mexico State	Passing	Diego Pavia	16/20, 317 yards, 2 TD
New Mexico State	Rushing	Star Thomas	12 rushes, 96 yards, 2 TD
New Mexico State	Receiving	Jonathan Brady	4 receptions, 102 yards, TD

=== at No. 14 North Dakota State ===
Western Illinois Leathernecks (0–6) vs No. 14 North Dakota State Bison (4–2)

Quarter	1	2	3	4	Total
Leathernecks	0	0	0	7	7
No. 14 Bison	14	24	14	0	52

at Fargodome, Fargo, ND

- Date: October 21, 2023
- Game time: 2:30 p.m. (CT)
- Game weather: Indoors; 70 °F (21 °C)
- Game attendance: 14,255
- Referee: Gregory Gompf
- TV: ESPN+

Statistics	Western Illinois	North Dakota State
First downs	10	22
Plays–yards	52–184	60–625
Rushes–yards	39–113	44–425
Passing yards	71	200
Passing: comp–att–int	8–13–1	11–16–0
Time of possession	27:41	32:19

Team	Category	Player	Statistics
Western Illinois	Passing	Matt Morrissey	8/13, 71 yds, TD, INT
Western Illinois	Rushing	Seth Glatz	11 car, 64 yds
Western Illinois	Receiving	AJ Coons	2 rec, 48 yds, TD
North Dakota State	Passing	Cam Miller	8/12, 103 yds
North Dakota State	Rushing	RaJa Nelson	3 car, 103 yds, TD
North Dakota State	Receiving	Joe Stoffel	2 rec, 84 yds, TD

Scoring summary

Quarter	Time	Drive			Team	Scoring information	Score	
Quarter	Time	Plays	Yards	TOP	Team	Scoring information	WIU	NDSU
1st	9:02	10	10	5:58	NDSU	TK Marshall (#28) 1-yard touchdown run, Griffin Crosa (#39) kick good	0	7
1st	1:51	7	65	4:11	NDSU	TK Marshall (#28) 1-yard touchdown run, Griffin Crosa (#39) kick good	0	14
2nd	13:12	4	20	1:35	NDSU	Barika Kpeenu (#8) 5-yard touchdown run, Griffin Crosa (#39) kick good	0	21
2nd	11:14	1	76	0:13	NDSU	RaJa Nelson (#6) 76-yard touchdown run, Griffin Crosa (#39) kick good	0	28
2nd	8:48	1	49	0:11	NDSU	Joe Stoffel (#82) 49-yard touchdown reception from Cole Payton (#9), Griffin Crosa (#39) kick good	0	35
2nd	0:05	12	81	5:14	NDSU	29-yard field goal by Griffin Crosa (#39)	0	38
3rd	10:45	4	65	2:13	NDSU	TK Marshall (#28) 38-yard touchdown run, Griffin Crosa (#39) kick good	0	45
3rd	4:36	6	75	3:44	NDSU	Barika Kpeenu (#8) 24-yard touchdown run, Griffin Crosa (#39) kick good	0	52
4th	6:26	2	48	0:44	WIU	AJ Coons (#15) 43-yard touchdown reception from Matt Morrissey (#7), Owen Valek (#57) kick good	7	52
"TOP" = time of possession. For other American football terms, see Glossary of American football.							7	52
