= Cole Wisniewski =

American football player (born 2002)

No. 38 – Philadelphia Eagles
- Position: Safety
- Roster status: Practice squad

Personal information
- Born: March 9, 2002 (age 24)
- Listed height: 6 ft 3 in (1.91 m)
- Listed weight: 219 lb (99 kg)

Career information
- High school: Sparta (Sparta, Wisconsin)
- College: North Dakota State (2020–2024); Texas Tech (2025)
- NFL draft: 2026: 7th round, 244th overall pick

Career history
- Philadelphia Eagles (2026–present)

Awards and highlights
- 2× FCS national champion (2021, 2024); First-team FCS All-American (2023); First team All-MVFC (2023)
- Stats at Pro Football Reference

Cole Wisniewski (wiss-NESS-kee; born March 9, 2002) is an American professional football safety for the Philadelphia Eagles of the National Football League (NFL). He played college football for the Texas Tech Red Raiders and the North Dakota State Bison and was selected by the Eagles in the seventh round of the 2026 NFL draft.

== Early life ==
Wisniewski attended Sparta High School in Sparta, Wisconsin, and committed to play college football for the North Dakota State Bison.

== College career ==
=== North Dakota State ===
During his time at North Dakota State from 2020 to 2023, Wisniewski logged 195 tackles, 15 pass deflections, and eight interceptions, earning FCS all-American honors. Wisniewski underwent foot surgery after a breakout 2023 season, forcing him to miss the entire 2024 season, after which he entered his name into the NCAA transfer portal.

=== Texas Tech ===
Wisniewski transferred to play for the Texas Tech Red Raiders. In week 10 of the 2025 season, he totaled ten tackles in a victory over BYU.

== Professional career ==
Pre-draft measurables
Height	Weight	Arm length	Hand span	Wingspan	Vertical jump	Broad jump	Bench press
6 ft 3 1/4 in (1.91 m)	219 lb (99 kg)	30 1/2 in (0.77 m)	9 5/8 in (0.24 m)	6 ft 3 1/2 in (1.92 m)	36.5 in (0.93 m)	10 ft 2 in (3.10 m)	22 reps
All values from Pro Day

Wisniewski was selected by the Philadelphia Eagles in the seventh round with the 244th overall pick of the 2026 NFL draft. He officially signed a rookie scale contract for four years on May 1. Wisniewski was waived by the Eagles on August 29 as a part of final roster cuts; he was re-signed to the team's practice squad two days later.
