= 2023 Indiana State Sycamores football team =

American college football season

2023 Indiana State Sycamores football
- Conference: Missouri Valley Football Conference
- Record: 1–10 (1–7 MVFC)
- Head coach: Curt Mallory (6th season)
- Offensive coordinator: Mike Bath (2nd season)
- Defensive coordinator: Brad Wilson (6th season)
- Home stadium: Memorial Stadium

2023 Missouri Valley Football Conference standings
	Conf.			Overall
Team	W		L	W		L
No. 1 South Dakota State $^	8	–	0	15	–	0
No. 4 South Dakota ^	7	–	1	10	–	3
No. 3 North Dakota State ^	5	–	3	11	–	4
No. 19 Youngstown State ^	5	–	3	8	–	5
No. 16 North Dakota ^	5	–	3	7	–	5
Northern Iowa	5	–	3	6	–	5
No. 12 Southern Illinois ^	4	–	4	8	–	5
Illinois State	4	–	4	6	–	5
Missouri State	3	–	5	4	–	7
Murray State	1	–	7	2	–	9
Indiana State	1	–	7	1	–	10
Western Illinois	0	–	8	0	–	11
$ – Conference champion; ^ – FCS playoff participant; Rankings from STATS Poll

The 2023 Indiana State Sycamores football team represented Indiana State University as a member of the Missouri Valley Football Conference (MVFC) during the 2023 NCAA Division I FCS football season. Led by sixth-year head coach Curt Mallory, the Sycamores compiled an overall record of 1–10 with a mark of 1–7 in conference play, tying for tenth place in the MVFC. Indiana State played home games at Memorial Stadium in Terre Haute, Indiana.

== Schedule ==
Date	Time	Opponent	Site	TV	Result	Attendance
August 31	6:00 p.m.	Eastern Illinois*	Memorial Stadium; Terre Haute, IN	ESPN+	L 0–27	4,355
September 8	7:00 p.m.	at Indiana*	Memorial Stadium; Bloomington, IN	BTN	L 7–41	18,759
September 16	2:00 p.m.	at Ball State*	Scheumann Stadium; Muncie, IN (Blue Key Victory Bell)	ESPN+	L 7–45	15,054
September 30	7:00 p.m.	at Murray State	Roy Stewart Stadium; Murray, KY	ESPN+	L 28–30	13,213
October 7	7:00 p.m.	Northern Iowa	Memorial Stadium; Terre Haute, IN	ESPN+	L 20–27	3,228
October 14	3:00 p.m.	at Illinois State	Hancock Stadium; Normal, IL	ESPN+	L 7–44	9,135
October 21	1:00 p.m.	No. 6 South Dakota^{†}	Memorial Stadium; Terre Haute, IN	ESPN+	L 3–17	4,908
October 28	2:00 p.m.	at No. 15 North Dakota	Alerus Center; Grand Forks, ND	ESPN+	L 33–36 ^{OT}	11,125
November 4	1:00 p.m.	No. 22 Youngstown State	Memorial Stadium; Terre Haute, IN	ESPN+	L 7–19	4,798
November 11	1:00 p.m.	Western Illinois	Memorial Stadium; Terre Haute, IN	ESPN+	W 27–6	3,151
November 18	2:00 p.m.	at No. 16 Southern Illinois	Saluki Stadium; Carbondale, IL	ESPN+	L 9–38	4,812
*Non-conference game; ^{†}Homecoming; Rankings from STATS Poll released prior to the game; All times are in Eastern time

== Game summaries ==
=== at Indiana ===
Indiana State Sycamores (0-2) vs Indiana Hoosiers (1-1) – Game summary

Quarter	1	2	3	4	Total
Sycamores	0	7	0	0	7
Hoosiers	21	3	7	10	41

at Memorial Stadium • Bloomington, Indiana

- Date: September 8th
- Game time: 7:00 p.m. EST
- Game weather: 71 °F (22 °C) • Wind: NW at 7 miles per hour (11 km/h) • Weather: Cloudy
- Game attendance: 42,775
- TV announcers (BTN): Pat Boylan (play-by-play), Brock Vereen (analyst), Meghan McKeown (sideline)

Game information

First quarter

- 12:04 IND - Jaylin Lucas 25-yard run (Chris Freeman kick) - Indiana 7-0, Drive: 4 plays, 73 yards, 1:18
- 8:52 IND - Jaylin Lucas 25-yard run (Chris Freeman kick) - Indiana 14-0, Drive: 6 plays, 81 yards, 2:17
- 2:04 IND - Tayven Jackson 10-yard run (Chris Freeman kick) - Indiana 21-0, Drive: 9 plays, 71 yards, 4:38

Second quarter

- 2:00 ISU - Maddix Blackwell 75-yard fumble return (Stephen Ruiz kick) - Indiana 21-7, Drive: 8 plays, 55 yards, 4:05
- 0:17 IND - Chris Freeman 28-yard field goal - Indiana 24-7, Drive: 10 plays, 42 yards, 1:39

Third quarter

- 1:39 IND - Christian Turner 1-yard run (Nicolas Radicic kick) - Indiana 31-7, Drive: 13 plays, 93 yards, 6:03

Fourth quarter

- 10:50 IND - Josh Henderson 3-yard run (Nicolas Radicic kick) - Indiana 38-7, Drive: 7 plays, 45 yards, 4:03
- 2:43 IND - Nicolas Radicic 21-yard field goal - Indiana 41-3, Drive: 15 plays, 74 yards, 7:07

Statistics	Indiana State	Indiana
First downs	8	33
Plays–yards	43–93	79–558
Rushes–yards	32–72	42–214
Passing yards	21	344
Passing: comp–att–int	3–11–1	27–37–0
Time of possession	23:11	36:49

Team	Category	Player	Statistics
Indiana State	Passing	Evan Olaes	3/9, 21 yards
Indiana State	Rushing	Korbin Allen	5 carries, 24 yards
Indiana State	Receiving	Harry Van Dyne	1 reception, 15 yards
Indiana	Passing	Tayven Jackson	18/21, 236 yards
Indiana	Rushing	Jaylin Lucas	10 carries, 88 yards, 2 TD
Indiana	Receiving	Omar Cooper Jr.	7 receptions, 101 yards

=== at Ball State ===
Game Three – Indiana State Sycamores (0–2) at Ball State Cardinals (0–2) – Game summary

Quarter	1	2	3	4	Total
Indiana State	0	0	7	0	7
Ball State	0	10	7	28	45

at Scheumann Stadium • Muncie, IN

- Date: Saturday, September 16, 2023
- Game time: 2:00 p.m. EST
- Game weather: -
- Game attendance: 15,054
- TV: ESPN+

Game information

First quarter

No scoring

Second quarter

- (12:13) BALL – Rico Barfield 16-yard pass from Kadin Semonza (Jackson Courville kick) (Drive: 11 plays, 73 yards, 5:20; Ball State 7–0)
- (1:34) BALL – Jackson Courville 23-yard field goal (Drive: 9 plays, 69 yards, 4:24; Ball State 10–0)

Third quarter

- (6:45) BALL – Rico Barfield 24-yard run (Jackson Courville kick) (Drive: 3 plays, 55 yards, 1:24; Ball State 17–0)
- (5:48) ISU – Dakota Caton 49-yard pass from Elijah Owens (Stephen Ruiz kick) (Drive: 2 plays, 61 yards, 0:50: Ball State 17–7)

Fourth quarter

- (13:12) BALL – Marquez Cooper 11-yard run (Jackson Courville kick) (Drive:13 plays, 75 yards, 7:29; Ball State 24–7)
- (11:32) BALL – Tanner Koziol 8-yard pass from Kadin Semonza (Jackson Courville kick) (Drive: 2 plays, 23 yards, 0:54: Ball State 31–7)
- (9:20) BALL – Keionte Newson 66-yard fumble return (Jackson Courville kick) (Ball State 38–7)
- (3:13) BALL – Charlie Spegal 1-yard run (Jackson Courville kick) (Drive: 5 plays, 35 yards, 2:49; Ball State 45–7)

Statistics	ISU	BALL
First downs	12	26
Total yards	53–261	66–425
Rushing yards	32–104	42–288
Passing yards	157	137
Passing: Comp–Att–Int	9–21–1	18–24–0
Time of possession	26:59	33:01

Team	Category	Player	Statistics
Indiana State	Passing	Elijah Owens	9/21, 157 yards, TD, INT
Indiana State	Rushing	Tee Hodge	9 carries, 46 yards
Indiana State	Receiving	Harry Van Dyne	3 receptions, 80 yards
Ball State	Passing	Kadin Semonza	17/22, 137 yards, 2 TD
Ball State	Rushing	Marquez Cooper	22 carries, 177 yards, TD
Ball State	Receiving	Tanner Koziol	7 receptions, 60 yards, TD
