= Myles Harden =

American football player (born 2001)

No. 26 – Cleveland Browns
- Position: Cornerback
- Roster status: Active

Personal information
- Born: December 13, 2001 (age 24); Miami Gardens, Florida, U.S.
- Listed height: 5 ft 11 in (1.80 m)
- Listed weight: 195 lb (88 kg)

Career information
- High school: Miramar (Miramar, Florida)
- College: South Dakota (2020–2023)
- NFL draft: 2024: 7th round, 227th overall pick

Career history
- Cleveland Browns (2024–present)

Awards and highlights
- First-team FCS All-American (2023); First-team All-MVFC (2023); Second-team All-MVFC (2022)

Career NFL statistics as of Week 4, 2026
- Total tackles: 66
- Interceptions: 1
- Interception yards: 25
- Pass deflections: 7
- Stats at Pro Football Reference

Myles Harden (born December 13, 2001) is an American professional football cornerback for the Cleveland Browns of the National Football League (NFL). He played college football for the South Dakota Coyotes and was selected by the Browns in the seventh round of the 2024 NFL draft.

== Early life ==
Harden was born on December 13, 2001, in Miami Gardens, Florida, where he grew up. After initially playing basketball, he first tried out football at age eight. He attended Miramar High School in Florida where he played both football and track and field, being a three-year varsity letter-winner on the football team after being called up from the junior varsity as a sophomore. As a junior, Harden received honorable mention All-County honors and as a senior he totaled eight interceptions while being named All-County. He helped Miramar win a district title and was invited to the Dade vs. Broward County All-Star Game. Harden received little attention as a recruit, ultimately enrolling at the University of South Dakota as a zero-star prospect.

== College career ==
Harden's first year, the 2020 season, was postponed to spring 2021 due to the COVID-19 pandemic, and in his debut, he totaled four tackles, two interceptions and two pass deflections. He ultimately started four games and recorded 16 tackles, nine pass deflections and two interceptions, being the nation leader in pass defended per game while being named honorable mention All-Missouri Valley Football Conference (MVFC), to the All-MVFC newcomer team, and freshman All-American by HERO Sports.

Harden's fall 2021 season ended six games in due to a leg injury; he was the team's fourth-leading tackler by the time of his injury. In 2022, he played in six games before re-injuring the same leg and missing the rest of the year. He nonetheless was named All-MVFC, HERO Sports sophomore All-American and was the third-leading tackler on the team by that point (44 tackles), also forcing six turnovers with nine pass deflections. In his senior year, Harden became team captain and played in 13 games, finishing with 58 tackles, seven pass deflections and an interception while being chosen first-team All-MVFC and first-team All-American by several selectors.

Harden declared for the 2024 NFL draft and received invites to the East–West Shrine Bowl and NFL Scouting Combine.

== Professional career ==
Pre-draft measurables
Height	Weight	Arm length	Hand span	Wingspan	40-yard dash	10-yard split	20-yard split	20-yard shuttle	Three-cone drill	Vertical jump	Broad jump	Bench press
5 ft 10 7/8 in (1.80 m)	195 lb (88 kg)	29 7/8 in (0.76 m)	9 3/8 in (0.24 m)	6 ft 2 in (1.88 m)	4.50 s	1.62 s	2.60 s	3.98 s	6.88 s	35.5 in (0.90 m)	9 ft 10 in (3.00 m)	13 reps
All values from NFL Combine

Harden was selected in the seventh round (227th overall) of the 2024 NFL draft by the Cleveland Browns. He was placed on injured reserve due to a shin injury on September 12, 2024. Harden was activated on December 14.

In Week 2 of the 2026 season, Harden recorded his first career interception against Baker Mayfield of the Tampa Bay Buccaneers.

== NFL career statistics ==
Legend
**Bold**	Career high

Year	Team	Games		Tackles					Interceptions						Fumbles				
Year	Team	GP	GS	Comb	Solo	Ast	Sack	TFL	PD	Int	Yds	Avg	Lng	TD	FF	Fmb	FR	Yds	TD
2024	CLE	4	0	5	3	2	0.0	0	0	0	0	0.0	0	0	0	0	0	0	0
2025	CLE	**16**	5	**48**	**28**	**20**	0.0	**2**	**4**	0	0	0.0	0	0	0	0	0	0	0
2026	CLE	4	3	13	7	6	0.0	0	3	**1**	**25**	**25.0**	**25**	0	0	0	0	0	0
Career		24	8	66	38	28	0.0	2	7	1	25	25.0	25	0	0	0	0	0	0
