= Mason McCormick =

American football player (born 2000)

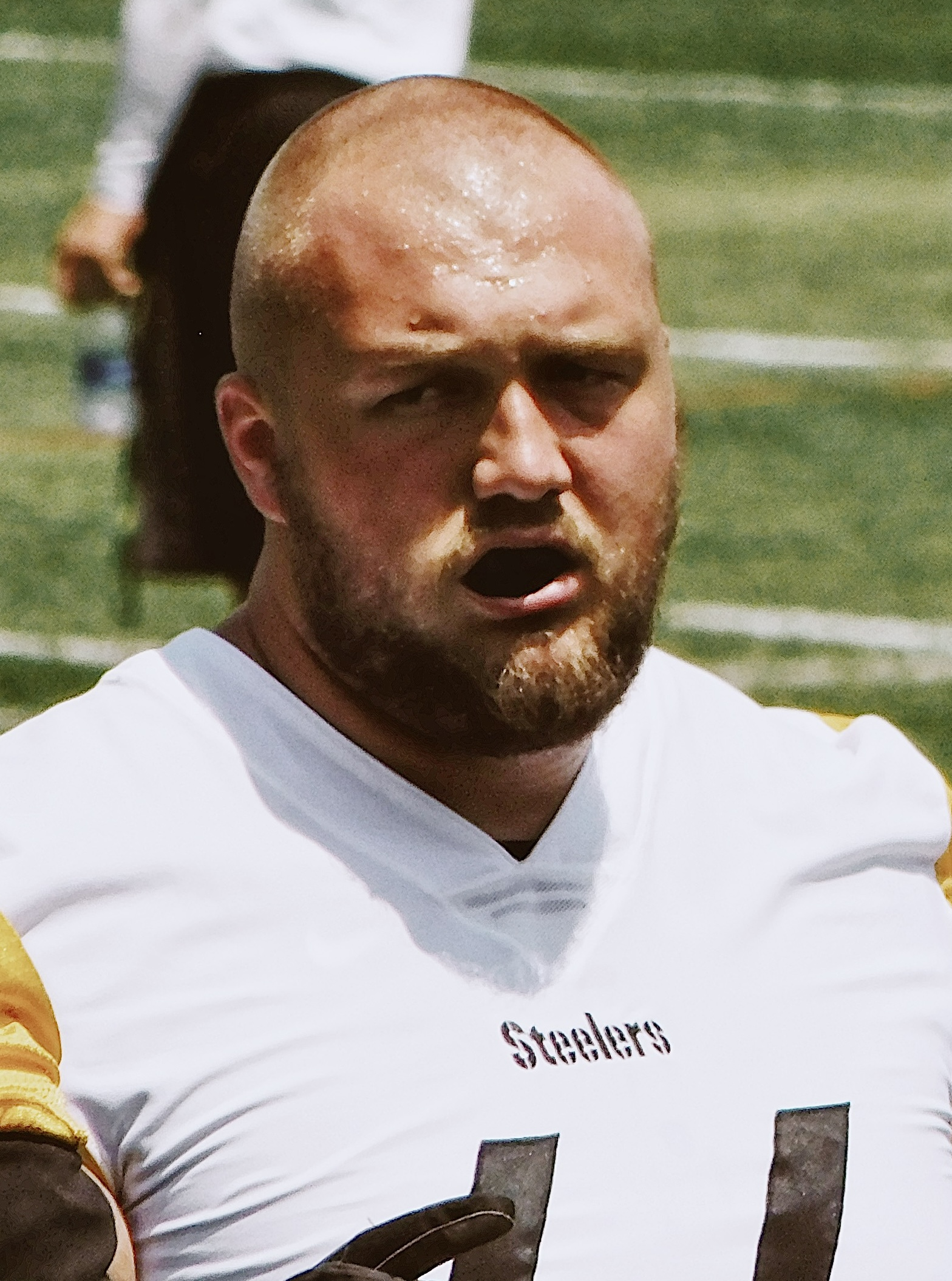
- McCormick with the Pittsburgh Steelers in 2025

No. 66 – Pittsburgh Steelers
- Position: Guard
- Roster status: Injured reserve

Personal information
- Born: May 25, 2000 (age 26); Sioux Falls, South Dakota, U.S.
- Listed height: 6 ft 5 in (1.96 m)
- Listed weight: 315 lb (143 kg)

Career information
- High school: Roosevelt (Sioux Falls)
- College: South Dakota State (2018–2023)
- NFL draft: 2024: 4th round, 119th overall pick

Career history
- Pittsburgh Steelers (2024–present)

Awards and highlights
- 2× FCS national champion (2022, 2023); 2× First-team FCS All-American (2022, 2023); 2× Second-team FCS All-American (2020, 2021); 2× First-team All-MVFC (2022, 2023); 2× Second team All-MVFC (2020, 2021)

Career NFL statistics as of 2026
- Games played: 43
- Games started: 40
- Stats at Pro Football Reference

Mason McCormick (born May 25, 2000) is an American professional football guard for the Pittsburgh Steelers of the National Football League (NFL). He played college football for the South Dakota State Jackrabbits and was selected by the Steelers in the fourth round of the 2024 NFL draft.

== Early life ==
From Sioux Falls, South Dakota, McCormick attended Roosevelt High School where he played football and was on the track and field team, being first-team all-state as a senior. He was a top athlete in both sports and helped the football team reach the state championship. An Argus-Leader Elite 45 selection, McCormick played mainly as an offensive guard but saw time at all offensive line positions. He committed to play college football for the South Dakota State Jackrabbits, being a zero-star prospect.

== College career ==
McCormick appeared in three games as a true freshman at South Dakota State in 2018, taking a redshirt. The following year, he played in the final 12 games and had two starts towards the end of the season. In the spring 2021 season, postponed from 2020 due to the COVID-19 pandemic, McCormick started all 10 games while helping South Dakota State reach the national championship, being chosen all-conference and an All-America selection. He then became a team captain and started all 15 games at left guard in the fall 2021 season, being named receiving his second second-team All-Missouri Valley Football Conference (MVFC) honor while also being an All-American.

In the 2022 season, McCormick started all 15 games and was a first-team All-MVFC selection and consensus All-American, helping South Dakota State win their first national championship. He was named six times the offensive lineman of the week and received the Adam Timmerman Award as co-offensive most valuable player at South Dakota State. He returned for a final season in 2023. He helped the team repeat as national champions while starting all 15 games, being named first-team All-MVFC and first-team All-American. He finished his collegiate career having started 57 consecutive games. He was invited to the East–West Shrine Bowl and to the NFL Scouting Combine.

== Professional career ==
Pre-draft measurables
Height	Weight	Arm length	Hand span	Wingspan	40-yard dash	10-yard split	20-yard split	20-yard shuttle	Three-cone drill	Vertical jump	Broad jump	Bench press
6 ft 4 1/4 in (1.94 m)	309 lb (140 kg)	33 7/8 in (0.86 m)	10 in (0.25 m)	6 ft 9 5/8 in (2.07 m)	5.08 s	1.71 s	2.89 s	4.45 s	7.59 s	35.5 in (0.90 m)	9 ft 9 in (2.97 m)	32 reps
All values from NFL Combine/Pro Day

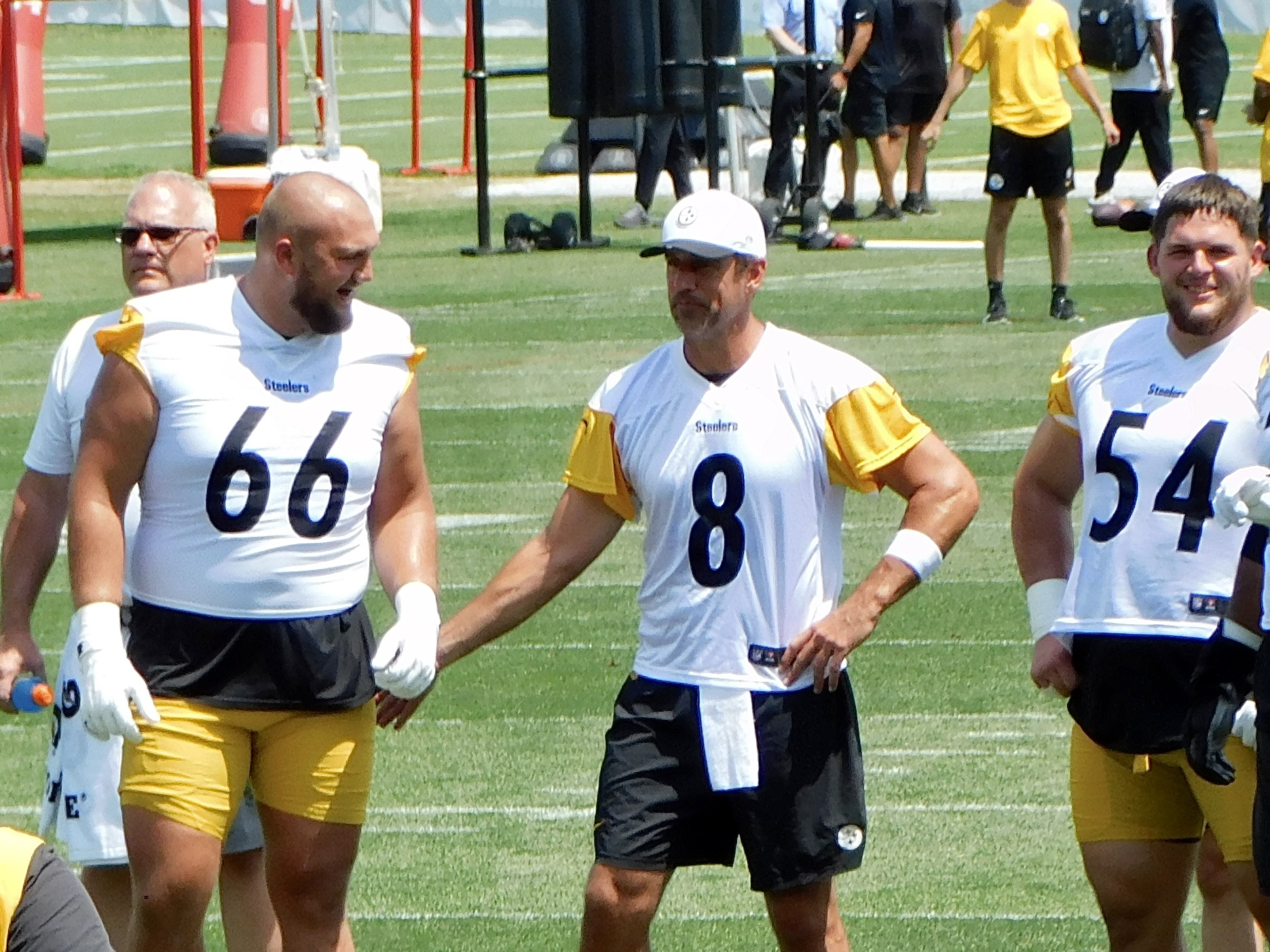
McCormick (66) alongside Aaron Rodgers and Zach Frazier during a Steelers practice in 2025

McCormick was selected by the Pittsburgh Steelers in the fourth round (119th overall) of the 2024 NFL draft.

He made his Steelers debut in Week 1’s victory over the Atlanta Falcons. Following injuries to Isaac Seumalo and Troy Fautanu, McCormick made his first professional start in Week 4's 27–24 loss to the Indianapolis Colts. At the conclusion of the 2024 regular season, McCormick played in all 17 games with 14 starts. He finished with a PFF grade of 57.7 overall, ranking him 87 out of 136 guards in the league. He had a pass blocking grade of 63.2 and a run block grade of 53.7. McCormick played 936 offensive snaps, placing him 42nd in the league. He and the Steelers ended their season with a 28–14 loss to the Baltimore Ravens in the AFC Wildcard round on January 11, 2025.

McCormick began 2025 playing all 58 offensive snaps in the Steelers' Week 1 victory over the New York Jets and earning a PFF grade of 63.6, placing him in the team's top ten. McCormick started all 17 games of the 2025 regular season.

== Personal life ==
In May 2025, McCormick got engaged to Addison Hirschman, who played basketball at South Dakota State. They married in April 2026.
