= Brock Mogensen =

American gridiron football player (born 2000)

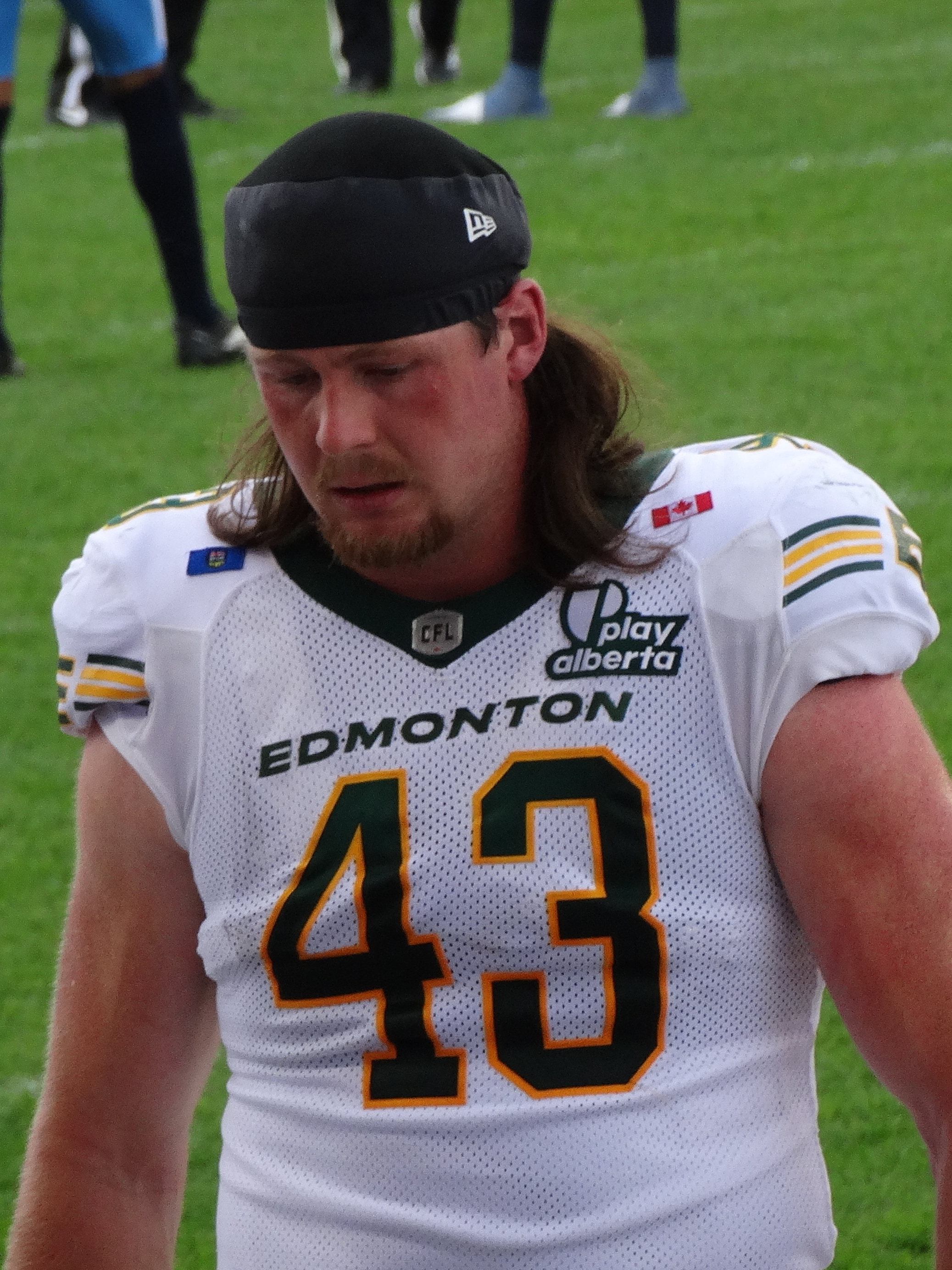
- Mogensen with the Edmonton Elks in 2025

No. 43 – Edmonton Elks
- Position: Linebacker
- Roster status: 6-game injured list
- CFL status: American

Personal information
- Born: February 9, 2000 (age 26); Farmington, Minnesota, U.S.
- Listed height: 6 ft 2 in (1.88 m)
- Listed weight: 235 lb (107 kg)

Career information
- High school: Farmington Senior
- College: South Dakota (2018–2023)
- NFL draft: 2024: undrafted

Career history
- Dallas Cowboys (2024)*; Edmonton Elks (2025–present)
- * Offseason or practice squad member only

Awards and highlights
- Grey Cup champion (2026); First-team FCS All-American (2023); MVFC Defensive Player of the Year (2023); First-team All-MVFC (2023); 2× Second-team All-MVFC (2020–21, 2022)
- Stats at Pro Football Reference

Brock Mogensen (born February 9, 2000) is an American professional football linebacker for the Edmonton Elks of the Canadian Football League (CFL). He played college football for the South Dakota Coyotes.

== Early life ==
Mogensen attended Farmington Senior High School located in Farmington, Minnesota. Coming out of high school, Mogensen was rated as a two-star recruit, where he committed to play college football for the South Dakota Coyotes.

== College career ==
During Mogensen's six-year career at South Dakota from 2018 to 2023, he appeared in 50 career games for the Coyotes, where he totaled 399 tackles with 15 being for a loss, three sacks, four pass deflections, two interceptions, a forced fumble, and a fumble recovery. Mogensen also earned multiple career honors being named the Missouri Valley Football Conference Defensive Player of the Year, first-team all-conference, and second-team all-conference honors twice.

== Professional career ==
Pre-draft measurables
Height	Weight	Arm length	Hand span	Wingspan	40-yard dash	10-yard split	20-yard split	20-yard shuttle	Three-cone drill	Vertical jump	Broad jump	Bench press
6 ft 2 1/8 in (1.88 m)	234 lb (106 kg)	31 1/8 in (0.79 m)	9 1/4 in (0.23 m)	6 ft 5 3/8 in (1.97 m)	4.78 s	1.71 s	2.75 s	4.29 s	6.96 s	33 in (0.84 m)	9 ft 7 in (2.92 m)	16 reps
All values from Pro Day

=== Dallas Cowboys ===
Mogensen signed with the Dallas Cowboys as an undrafted free agent on May 8, 2024. However on August 27, Mogensen was released by the Cowboys during final roster cuts, but re-signed to the team's practice squad the following day.

Mogensen signed a reserve/future contract with Dallas on January 6, 2025. On April 30, Mogensen was waived by the Cowboys.

=== Edmonton Elks ===
The Edmonton Elks announced on May 26, 2025, that they had added Brock Mogensen.
