= Garret Greenfield =

American football player (born 1999)

No. 76, 62, 74
- Position: Offensive tackle

Personal information
- Born: September 20, 1999 (age 27); Sioux Center, Iowa, U.S.
- Listed height: 6 ft 6 in (1.98 m)
- Listed weight: 310 lb (141 kg)

Career information
- High school: Rock Valley (Rock Valley, Iowa)
- College: South Dakota State (2018–2023)
- NFL draft: 2024: undrafted

Career history
- Seattle Seahawks (2024)*; New York Giants (2024)*; Tampa Bay Buccaneers (2024)*
- * Offseason or practice squad member only

Awards and highlights
- 2× FCS national champion (2022, 2023); 3× First-team FCS All-American (2020, 2022, 2023); 3× First-team All-MVFC (2020, 2022, 2023)
- Stats at Pro Football Reference

Garret Greenfield (born September 20, 1999) is an American former professional football player who was an offensive tackle. He played college football for the South Dakota State Jackrabbits and was signed by the Seattle Seahawks as an undrafted free agent after the 2024 NFL draft.

== Early life ==
From Rock Valley, Iowa, Greenfield attended Rock Valley High School where he played football, basketball and baseball. Playing both on the offensive line and defensive line, he was twice named the team's most valuable offensive lineman, helping them win the state championship in 2016 while being semifinalists in 2017. He committed to play college football for the South Dakota State Jackrabbits (SDSU).

== College career ==
As a true freshman at South Dakota State in 2018, Greenfield appeared in three games while redshirting. The following year, he played in a total of seven games. In the spring 2021 season, postponed from 2020 due to the COVID-19 pandemic, Greenfield started all 10 games while helping South Dakota State reach their first national championship, being named a first-team All-American by several selectors.

Greenfield started all 15 games in the fall 2021 season, mainly playing as a right tackle. He shifted to left tackle in 2022 and started all 15 games while adding the role of team captain, being named a first-team All-American while helping SDSU win their first national championship. He returned for a final season in 2023 and won another national championship while starting all 15 games, receiving another All-America selection. He declared for the 2024 NFL draft and was invited to the East–West Shrine Bowl and NFL Scouting Combine. At the combine, he posted the all-time offensive lineman record in the vertical jump.

== Professional career ==
Pre-draft measurables
Height	Weight	Arm length	Hand span	40-yard dash	10-yard split	20-yard split	20-yard shuttle	Three-cone drill	Vertical jump	Broad jump
6 ft 5 3/4 in (1.97 m)	311 lb (141 kg)	33 1/2 in (0.85 m)	9 3/4 in (0.25 m)	5.22 s	1.77 s	2.98 s	4.85 s	7.76 s	38.5 in (0.98 m)	9 ft 5 in (2.87 m)
All values from NFL Combine

=== Seattle Seahawks ===
Greenfield signed with the Seattle Seahawks as an undrafted free agent on May 3, 2024. He was also selected by the DC Defenders in the fourth round of the 2024 UFL draft on July 17. On August 30, Greenfield was released by the Seahawks.

=== New York Giants ===
On October 30, 2024, the New York Giants signed Greenfield to their practice squad. He was released on November 19.

=== Tampa Bay Buccaneers ===
On January 1, 2025, the Tampa Bay Buccaneers signed Greenfield to their practice squad. He signed a reserve/future contract with Tampa Bay on January 14. On July 24, Greenfield retired from professional football.
