= Isaiah Stalbird =

American football player (born 2000)

No. 44 – New Orleans Saints
- Position: Linebacker
- Roster status: Active

Personal information
- Born: July 16, 2000 (age 26); Kearney, Nebraska, U.S.
- Listed height: 6 ft 1 in (1.85 m)
- Listed weight: 215 lb (98 kg)

Career information
- High school: Kearney
- College: Nebraska (2018–2019); South Dakota State (2020–2023)
- NFL draft: 2024: undrafted

Career history
- New Orleans Saints (2024–present)

Awards and highlights
- Second-team All-MVFC (2023)

Career NFL statistics as of 2025
- Total tackles: 28
- Sacks: 2
- Pass deflections: 1
- Stats at Pro Football Reference

Isaiah Stalbird (born July 16, 2000) is an American professional football linebacker for the New Orleans Saints of the National Football League (NFL). He played college football for the Nebraska Cornhuskers and South Dakota State Jackrabbits.

== Early life ==
Stalbird was born on July 16, 2000, and grew up in Kearney, Nebraska. He attended Kearney High School where he competed in football, soccer and wrestling. He was a two-way player in football and helped the team reach the state finals in his senior year while being their leader in receiving yards, touchdowns, and fumble recoveries. He had 393 receiving yards and six touchdowns, 77 tackles, four fumble recoveries, and two interceptions in his last year, being selected first-team All-Nebraska by the Omaha World-Herald and Super-State team by the Lincoln Journal Star. He walked-on to play college football for the Nebraska Cornhuskers.

== College career ==
Stalbird redshirted as a true freshman at Nebraska in 2018. The following year, he appeared in 12 games, mainly on special teams, and made 13 tackles and a blocked punt. After the 2019 season, he transferred to the South Dakota State Jackrabbits.

Stalbird appeared in all 10 games for South Dakota State during the 2020–21 season, helping them reach the FCS national championship while totaling 30 tackles and four pass breakups. Initially a safety with the Jackrabbits, he switched to linebacker for the fall 2021 season. He started 14 of 15 games that year and was second on the team with 73 tackles, also being tied for the lead with two forced fumbles. In 2022, he started 10 games and was third on the Jackrabbits with 55 tackles and was also third with four pass breakups. Stalbird helped South Dakota State win the 2022 national championship over North Dakota State. He played a final season for the team in 2023 and won another national championship, ending the 2023 season with 80 tackles, three sacks and five pass breakups. He ended his collegiate career with 238 tackles, 18.5 tackles-for-loss (TFLs), 18 pass deflections, and five forced fumbles.

== Professional career ==
Pre-draft measurables
Height	Weight	Arm length	Hand span	Wingspan	40-yard dash	10-yard split	20-yard split	20-yard shuttle	Three-cone drill	Vertical jump	Broad jump	Bench press
5 ft 11 3/4 in (1.82 m)	221 lb (100 kg)	31 3/4 in (0.81 m)	9 1/4 in (0.23 m)	6 ft 5 3/8 in (1.97 m)	4.50 s	1.50 s	2.59 s	4.19 s	7.23 s	37.5 in (0.95 m)	10 ft 7 in (3.23 m)	18 reps
All values from Pro Day

After going unselected in the 2024 NFL draft, Stalbird signed with the New Orleans Saints as an undrafted free agent. He was also selected in the 10th round (78th overall) of the 2024 UFL draft by the Michigan Panthers. Stalbird was waived by the Saints as a part of final roster cuts on August 27; he was re-signed to the team's practice squad the following day. He was elevated to the active roster on September 14, for the team's Week 2 game against the Dallas Cowboys, and made his debut in the game, recording one tackle while appearing on 14 special teams snaps. Stalbird was signed to the Saints' active roster on December 28.

In Week 12 of the 2025 season against the Atlanta Falcons, Stalbird recorded his first career sack on Kirk Cousins.

== NFL career statistics ==
Legend
**Bold**	Career high

Year	Team	Games		Tackles					Interceptions						Fumbles				
Year	Team	GP	GS	Cmb	Solo	Ast	Sck	TFL	Int	Yds	Avg	Lng	TD	PD	FF	Fum	FR	Yds	TD
2024	NO	5	0	3	1	2	0.0	0	0	0	0.0	0	0	0	0	0	0	0	0
2025	NO	**17**	0	**25**	**12**	**13**	**2.0**	**2**	0	0	0.0	0	0	**1**	0	0	0	0	0
Career		22	0	28	13	15	2.0	2	0	0	0.0	0	0	1	0	0	0	0	0
