= Bryce Oliver =

American football player (born 2000)

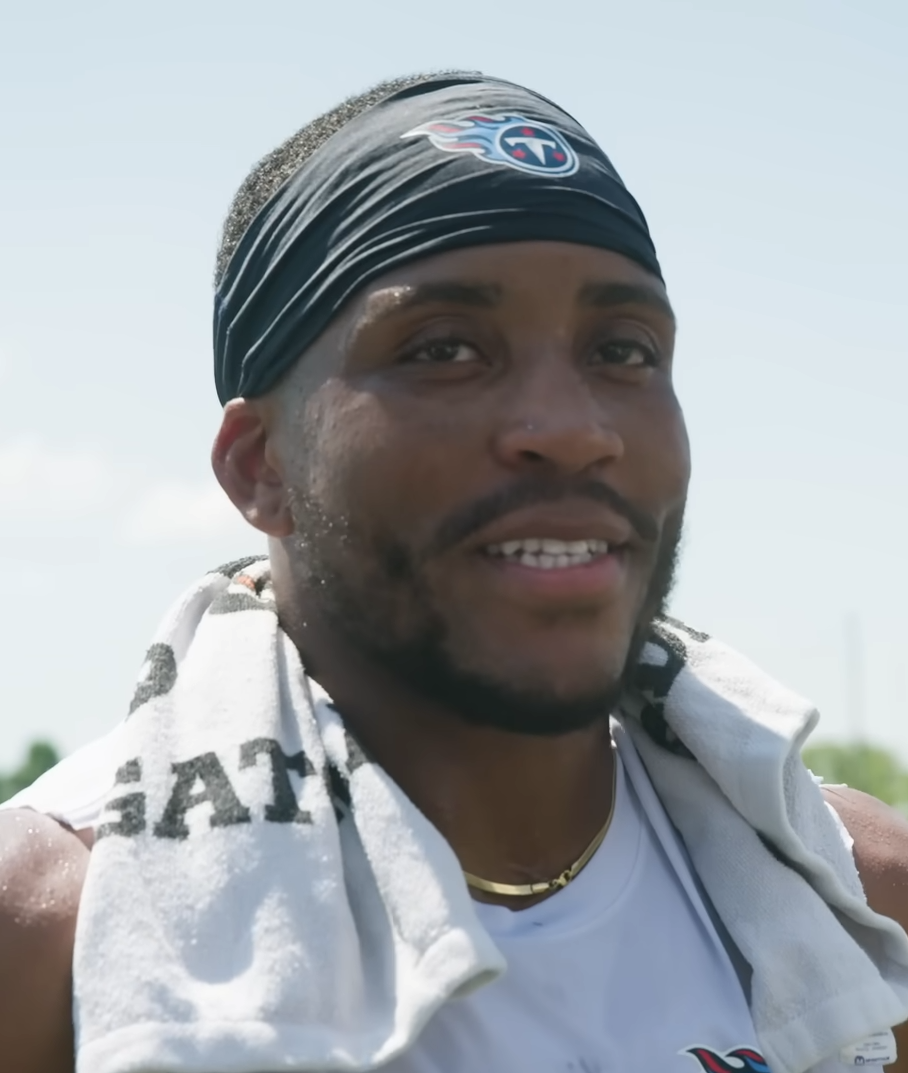
- Oliver with the Tennessee Titans in 2025

No. 84 – Houston Texans
- Position: Wide receiver
- Roster status: Practice squad

Personal information
- Born: May 19, 2000 (age 26); Fort Lauderdale, Florida, U.S.
- Listed height: 6 ft 1 in (1.85 m)
- Listed weight: 214 lb (97 kg)

Career information
- High school: Dillard (Fort Lauderdale, Florida)
- College: Kentucky (2018–2020); Youngstown State (2021–2023)
- NFL draft: 2024: undrafted

Career history
- Tennessee Titans (2024–2025); Cleveland Browns (2026)*; Houston Texans (2026–present)
- * Offseason or practice squad member only

Awards and highlights
- First-team All-MVFC (2022); Second-team All-MVFC (2023)

Career NFL statistics as of 2025
- Receptions: 7
- Receiving yards: 103
- Return yards: 113
- Stats at Pro Football Reference

Bryce Oliver (born May 19, 2000) is an American professional football wide receiver for the Houston Texans of the National Football League (NFL). He played college football for the Kentucky Wildcats and Youngstown State Penguins. Oliver previously played for the Tennessee Titans.

== Early life ==
Oliver was born on May 19, 2000, in Fort Lauderdale, Florida. He attended Dillard High School in Fort Lauderdale and competed in football and basketball, winning consecutive state championships in the latter. He had 76 receptions for 1,112 yards and five touchdowns as a junior, but suffered a knee injury as a senior which led to a significant drop in attention as a recruit. A three-star prospect, he committed to play college football for the Kentucky Wildcats, the only program to continue to show interest in him after his injury.

== College career ==
Oliver redshirted as a freshman at Kentucky in 2018. He appeared in 12 games during the 2019 season, posting six catches for 111 yards and a touchdown. He battled injuries in 2020, playing six games while having two catches for 14 yards. He entered the NCAA transfer portal following the season.

Oliver transferred to the Youngstown State Penguins in 2021, playing nine games that year, six as a starter, and finishing second on the team with 24 receptions for 266 yards and a team-leading eight touchdowns. In 2022, he caught 59 passes for 821 yards and 10 touchdowns, being named first-team All-Missouri Valley Football Conference (MVFC) while having the most single-season receiving touchdowns for a Youngstown State player since 1983. As a senior in 2023, he broke the school record for career receiving touchdowns with 26 and finished the season with 64 receptions for 978 yards and eight touchdowns.

== Professional career ==
Pre-draft measurables
| Height | Weight | Arm length | Hand span | Wingspan | 40-yard dash | 10-yard split | 20-yard split | 20-yard shuttle | Three-cone drill | Vertical jump | Broad jump | Bench press |
|---|---|---|---|---|---|---|---|---|---|---|---|---|
| 6 ft 1 1/8 in (1.86 m) | 214 lb (97 kg) | 32 1/2 in (0.83 m) | 9 1/8 in (0.23 m) | 6 ft 5 in (1.96 m) | 4.55 s | 1.64 s | 2.60 s | 4.31 s | 7.15 s | 32.0 in (0.81 m) | 10 ft 3 in (3.12 m) | 12 reps |
All values from Pro Day

=== Tennessee Titans ===
After going unselected in the 2024 NFL draft, Oliver signed with the Tennessee Titans as an undrafted free agent. In preseason, he caught eight passes for 90 yards and two touchdowns. He was released at the final roster cuts, on August 27, 2024, and re-signed to the practice squad the following day. He was signed to the active roster on November 2, prior to the team's Week 9 game against the New England Patriots, where he made his regular season debut. He appeared in nine games during the 2024 season, making six receptions for 95 yards and three kick returns for 113 yards, along with five tackles as a gunner on special teams.

Oliver began the 2025 season as one of Tennessee's auxiliary wide receivers. He was placed on injured reserve on November 15, 2025, due to a knee injury. Oliver was activated on January 3, 2026, ahead of the team's season finale against the Jacksonville Jaguars.

On August 30, 2026, Oliver was waived by the Titans as a part of final roster cuts before the start of the regular season.

=== Cleveland Browns ===
On September 2, 2026, Oliver signed with the Cleveland Browns' practice squad. Oliver was released by Cleveland on September 8.

=== Houston Texans ===
On September 17, 2026, Oliver signed with the Houston Texans' practice squad. On September 30, he was released. On October 8, Oliver was signed to the active roster, waived two days later and re-signed to the practice squad on October 14.
