= 2023 North Dakota Fighting Hawks football team =

American college football season

2023 North Dakota Fighting Hawks football

NCAA Division I First Round, L 35–42 vs. Sacramento State
- Conference: Missouri Valley Football Conference

Ranking
- STATS: No. 12
- FCS Coaches: No. 14
- Record: 7–5 (5–3 MVFC)
- Head coach: Bubba Schweigert (10th season)
- Offensive coordinator: Danny Freund (5th season)
- Offensive scheme: Pistol
- Defensive coordinator: Joel Schwenzfeier (1st season)
- Base defense: 3–4
- Home stadium: Alerus Center

2023 Missouri Valley Football Conference standings
| | Conf. | | | Overall |
| Team | W | | L | W | | L |
|---|---|---|---|---|---|---|
| No. 1 South Dakota State $^ | 8 | – | 0 | 15 | – | 0 |
| No. 4 South Dakota ^ | 7 | – | 1 | 10 | – | 3 |
| No. 3 North Dakota State ^ | 5 | – | 3 | 11 | – | 4 |
| No. 19 Youngstown State ^ | 5 | – | 3 | 8 | – | 5 |
| No. 16 North Dakota ^ | 5 | – | 3 | 7 | – | 5 |
| Northern Iowa | 5 | – | 3 | 6 | – | 5 |
| No. 12 Southern Illinois ^ | 4 | – | 4 | 8 | – | 5 |
| Illinois State | 4 | – | 4 | 6 | – | 5 |
| Missouri State | 3 | – | 5 | 4 | – | 7 |
| Murray State | 1 | – | 7 | 2 | – | 9 |
| Indiana State | 1 | – | 7 | 1 | – | 10 |
| Western Illinois | 0 | – | 8 | 0 | – | 11 |
$ – Conference champion; ^ – FCS playoff participant; Rankings from STATS Poll

The 2023 North Dakota Fighting Hawks football team represented the University of North Dakota as a member of the Missouri Valley Football Conference (MVFC) during the 2023 NCAA Division I FCS football season. Led by tenth-year head coach Bubba Schweigert, the team played their home games at the Alerus Center in Grand Forks, North Dakota. The North Dakota Fighting Hawks football team drew an average home attendance of 10,288 in 2023.

== Schedule ==
| Date | Time | Opponent | Rank | Site | TV | Result | Attendance |
|---|---|---|---|---|---|---|---|
| September 2 | 3:00 p.m. | Drake* | No. 17 | Alerus Center; Grand Forks, ND | MidcoSN/ESPN+ | W 55–7 | 8,503 |
| September 9 | 3:00 p.m. | Northern Arizona* | No. 17 | Alerus Center; Grand Forks, ND | ESPN+ | W 37–22 | 10,009 |
| September 16 | 11:00 a.m. | at Boise State* | No. 14 | Albertsons Stadium; Boise, ID | FS1 | L 18–42 | 35,610 |
| September 30 | 2:00 p.m. | at No. 1 South Dakota State | No. 12 | Dana J. Dykhouse Stadium; Brookings, SD | MidcoSN | L 21–42 | 19,231 |
| October 7 | 1:00 p.m. | Western Illinois^{†} | No. 16 | Alerus Center; Grand Forks, ND | MidcoSN/ESPN+ | W 49–10 | 9,758 |
| October 14 | 1:00 p.m. | No. 6 North Dakota State | No. 15 | Alerus Center; Grand Forks, ND (Nickel Trophy) | MidcoSN/ESPN+ | W 49–24 | 13,091 |
| October 21 | 4:00 p.m. | at Northern Iowa | No. 11 | UNI-Dome; Cedar Falls, IA | ESPN3 | L 0–27 | 10,677 |
| October 28 | 1:00 p.m. | Indiana State | No. 15 | Alerus Center; Grand Forks, ND | MidcoSN2/ESPN+ | W 36–33 ^{OT} | 11,125 |
| November 4 | 1:00 p.m. | at Murray State | No. 13 | Roy Stewart Stadium; Murray, KY | MidcoSN2 | W 45–31 | 6,217 |
| November 11 | 12:00 p.m. | at No. 6 South Dakota | No. 10 | DakotaDome; Vermillion, SD (Sitting Bull Trophy) | MidcoSN | L 10–14 | 6,834 |
| November 18 | 1:00 p.m. | Illinois State | No. 13 | Alerus Center; Grand Forks, ND | MidcoSN/ESPN+ | W 22–21 | 9,238 |
| November 25 | 12:00 p.m. | No. 15 Sacramento State* | No. 12 | Alerus Center; Grand Forks, ND (NCAA Division I First Round) | ESPN+ | L 35–42 | 6,522 |
*Non-conference game; ^{†}Homecoming; Rankings from STATS Poll released prior to the game; All times are in Central time
