= Jalen Sundell =

American football player (born 1999)

No. 61 – Seattle Seahawks
- Position: Center
- Roster status: Active

Personal information
- Born: October 18, 1999 (age 27); Maryville, Missouri, U.S.
- Listed height: 6 ft 5 in (1.96 m)
- Listed weight: 301 lb (137 kg)

Career information
- High school: Maryville (MO)
- College: North Dakota State (2018–2023)
- NFL draft: 2024: undrafted

Career history
- Seattle Seahawks (2024–present)

Awards and highlights
- Super Bowl champion (LX); 3× FCS national champion (2018, 2019, 2021); First-team FCS All-American (2023); First-team All-MVFC (2023)

Career NFL statistics as of Week 4, 2026
- Games played: 29
- Games started: 17
- Stats at Pro Football Reference

Jalen Sundell (born October 18, 1999) is an American professional football center for the Seattle Seahawks of the National Football League (NFL). He played college football for the North Dakota State Bison and was signed by the Seattle Seahawks as an undrafted free agent in 2024.

== College career ==
Sundell played college football at North Dakota State. As a senior, Sundell played left tackle, earning an FCS First-team All-American selection. He was teammates with the Seahawks' 2025 first round draft pick, Grey Zabel.

== Professional career ==
Pre-draft measurables
Height	Weight	Arm length	Hand span	Wingspan	40-yard dash	10-yard split	20-yard split	20-yard shuttle	Three-cone drill	Vertical jump	Broad jump	Bench press
6 ft 5 in (1.96 m)	301 lb (137 kg)	33 1/8 in (0.84 m)	9 1/2 in (0.24 m)	6 ft 5 7/8 in (1.98 m)	5.19 s	1.77 s	2.90 s	4.58 s	7.63 s	30.5 in (0.77 m)	8 ft 9 in (2.67 m)	26 reps
All values from NFL Combine/Pro Day

=== Seattle Seahawks ===
After going undrafted in the 2024 NFL draft, Sundell signed with the Cleveland Browns on April 30 but was quickly waived for medical reasons. He signed with the Seattle Seahawks on July 23, 2024. Sundell made the cut of the Seahawks' initial 53-man roster out of training camp, and appeared in 12 games for the team during his rookie campaign.

Entering the 2025 season, Sundell was named Seattle's starting center, beating out Olu Oluwatimi for the job. He started all nine games he appeared in prior to his injury. After suffering a knee injury in Week 10 against the Arizona Cardinals, Sundell was placed on injured reserve on November 15, 2025. He was activated on December 13, ahead of the team's Week 15 matchup against the Indianapolis Colts. He started in Super Bowl LX, a 29–13 win over the New England Patriots.

== Personal life ==
Sundell's younger sister, Serena, was a Kansas State guard who was drafted by the Seattle Storm with the 26th pick in the 2025 WNBA draft.
