= Mike Markuson =

American gridiron football player and coach (born 1961)

Biographical details
- Born: June 15, 1961 (age 65); Farmington, Minnesota

Playing career
- 1979–1982: Hamline
- Position: Defensive tackle

Coaching career (HC unless noted)
- 1983: Farmington Senior HS (MN) (DL)
- 1984–1985: South Dakota State (DL)
- 1986: Hamline (DL)
- 1987–1988: Oklahoma State (GA)
- 1989: Notre Dame (GA)
- 1990: Austin Peay (OL)
- 1991–1992: Alabama A&M (OC/OL)
- 1993–1996: Murray State (OL)
- 1997: Boise State (OC/OL)
- 1998–2007: Arkansas (OL)
- 2008–2011: Ole Miss (OL)
- 2012: Wisconsin (OL)
- 2013: Northeast Mississippi CC (OL)
- 2014: Eastern Illinois (OL)
- 2015: UTSA (OL)
- 2016–2017: Hamilton Tiger-Cats (OL)
- 2020–2022: Jackson State (OL)

Mike Markuson (born June 15, 1961) is an American gridiron football coach. He was formerly the offensive line coach for Jackson State and the Hamilton Tiger-Cats of the Canadian Football League (CFL). Markuson was the offensive line coach at the University of Wisconsin–Madison from January to September 9, 2012.

== Education ==
Markuson is a 1979 graduate of Farmington Senior High School in Farmington, Minnesota. He earned his B.A. in psychology at Hamline University in 1983, and earned his M.S. in athletic administration at South Dakota State University in 1986. Markuson also played football for Hamline from 1979 to 1982 at the defensive tackle position.

== Coaching experience ==
As an assistant coach, Markuson has coached on both the high school and college levels of football. He coached for his alma mater, Farmington High in 1983 as the defensive line coach. Overall, Markuson has coached at nine different colleges spread across the different division levels of NCAA football.

In 1984, Markuson returned to South Dakota State where he coached the defensive line until 1985. Moving back to Hamline University in 1986, he spent a season there coaching the defensive line. In 1987, Oklahoma State offered him a position as a graduate assistant coach which he accepted. After two seasons at Oklahoma State, Markuson had the opportunity to become a graduate assistant at one of college football's traditional powerhouses, Notre Dame. In his season with the Fighting Irish, he was able to coach in the coveted Orange Bowl in January 1990. After spending three seasons as a graduate assistant coach, Austin Peay State University in Tennessee offered him the position of coaching the offensive line. He has coached the offensive line units ever since his move to Austin Peay. He spent only one season there, moving on to Alabama A&M in 1991. In 1992, he was granted the reigns as the offensive coordinator at Alabama A&M to add to his responsibilities of offensive line coach.

Markuson moved on to Murray State University under newly hired head coach Houston Nutt in 1993. After suffering two consecutive losing seasons at Murray State in 1993 and 1994, Nutt and Markuson turned the program around. From 1995 to 1996, the Racers posted a combined record of 22–3. In 1997, Nutt was hired as the head coach at Boise State University. He decided to bring Markuson and Bobby Allen, the inside linebackers coach and defensive coordinator for Murray State, with him to Boise, Idaho. The Broncos finished the season with a 5–6 record. Nutt was hired as the head coach of the Arkansas Razorbacks in December 1997 and brought Markuson in to coach the offensive line. In 2003, he was also named the team's running game coordinator. Markuson coached in six post-season bowl games at Arkansas, including a Florida Citrus Bowl (1999) and two Cotton Bowl Classics (2000, 2002). Under Markuson's offensive line coaching, the Razorbacks led the Southeastern Conference in rushing offense for nearly five consecutive seasons. Markuson coached the Arkansas offensive line from 1998 until his departure to Ole Miss for the 2008 season. Markuson continued in his roles as offensive line coach and running game coordinator at Ole Miss until 2010 when he was promoted to co-offensive coordinator.

Markuson debuted as the offensive line coach for the Wisconsin Badgers in January 2012, but was fired on September 9, 2012 after just two games, including a 10–7 loss to the Oregon State Beavers.

UTSA head coach Larry Coker announced Monday February 23, 2015 that he has hired Mike Markuson as an assistant coach. He will tutor the program’s offensive linemen and his appointment is effective March 2, 2015.

He was named the named offensive line coach of the Hamilton Tiger-Cats on April 11, 2016.

== Personal life ==
Markuson has two children, Joy Noelle and Elliot Bryan, with his wife, Dottie (née Bryant).
