= 2023 Southern Illinois Salukis football team =

American college football season

2023 Southern Illinois Salukis football

NCAA Division I Second Round, L 17–20^{OT} at Idaho
- Conference: Missouri Valley Football Conference

Ranking
- STATS: No. 12
- FCS Coaches: No. 13
- Record: 8–5 (4–4 MVFC)
- Head coach: Nick Hill (8th season)
- Offensive coordinator: Blake Rolan (5th season)
- Defensive coordinator: Antonio James (1st season)
- Home stadium: Saluki Stadium

2023 Missouri Valley Football Conference standings
	Conf.			Overall
Team	W		L	W		L
No. 1 South Dakota State $^	8	–	0	15	–	0
No. 4 South Dakota ^	7	–	1	10	–	3
No. 3 North Dakota State ^	5	–	3	11	–	4
No. 19 Youngstown State ^	5	–	3	8	–	5
No. 16 North Dakota ^	5	–	3	7	–	5
Northern Iowa	5	–	3	6	–	5
No. 12 Southern Illinois ^	4	–	4	8	–	5
Illinois State	4	–	4	6	–	5
Missouri State	3	–	5	4	–	7
Murray State	1	–	7	2	–	9
Indiana State	1	–	7	1	–	10
Western Illinois	0	–	8	0	–	11
$ – Conference champion; ^ – FCS playoff participant; Rankings from STATS Poll

The 2023 Southern Illinois Salukis football team represented Southern Illinois University Carbondale as a member of the Missouri Valley Football Conference (MVFC) during the 2023 NCAA Division I FCS football season. Led by eight-year head coach Nick Hill, the Salukis played their home games at Saluki Stadium in Carbondale, Illinois.

== Schedule ==
Date	Time	Opponent	Rank	Site	TV	Result	Attendance
September 2	6:00 p.m.	Austin Peay*		Saluki Stadium; Carbondale, IL	ESPN+	W 49–23	8,327
September 9	2:30 p.m.	at Northern Illinois*	No. 24	Huskie Stadium; DeKalb, IL	ESPN+	W 14–11	13,114
September 16	6:00 p.m.	at No. 13 Southeast Missouri State*	No. 15	Houck Stadium; Cape Girardeau, MO	ESPN+	W 26–25	8,613
September 30	4:00 p.m.	Missouri State*	No. 10	Saluki Stadium; Carbondale, IL	ESPN+	W 33–20	10,359
October 7	5:00 p.m.	at Youngstown State	No. 6	Stambaugh Stadium; Youngstown, OH	ESPN+	L 3–31	9,767
October 14	2:00 p.m.	at Murray State	No. 13	Roy Stewart Stadium; Murray, KY	ESPN+	W 27–6	15,868
October 21	2:00 p.m.	No. 1 South Dakota State^{†}	No. 12	Saluki Stadium; Carbondale, IL	ESPN+	L 10–17	11,927
October 28	3:00 p.m.	at Western Illinois	No. 11	Hanson Field; Macomb, IL	ESPN+	W 63–0	2,636
November 4	1:00 p.m.	No. 9 South Dakota	No. 10	Saluki Stadium; Carbondale, IL	ESPN+	L 7–14	7,106
November 11	2:30 p.m.	at No. 12 North Dakota State	No. 11	Fargodome; Fargo, ND	ESPN+	L 10–34	14,191
November 18	1:00 p.m.	Indiana State	No. 16	Saluki Stadium; Carbondale, IL	ESPN+	W 38–9	4,812
November 25	2:00 p.m.	Nicholls*	No. 14	Saluki Stadium; Carbondale, IL (NCAA Division I First Round)	ESPN+	W 35–0	4,576
December 2	9:00 p.m.	at No. 4 Idaho*	No. 14	Kibbie Dome; Moscow, ID (NCAA Division I Second Round)	ESPN2	L 17–20 ^{OT}	9,224
*Non-conference game; ^{†}Homecoming; Rankings from STATS Poll released prior to the game; All times are in Central time
