= Farmington Senior High School (Minnesota) =

Farmington High School
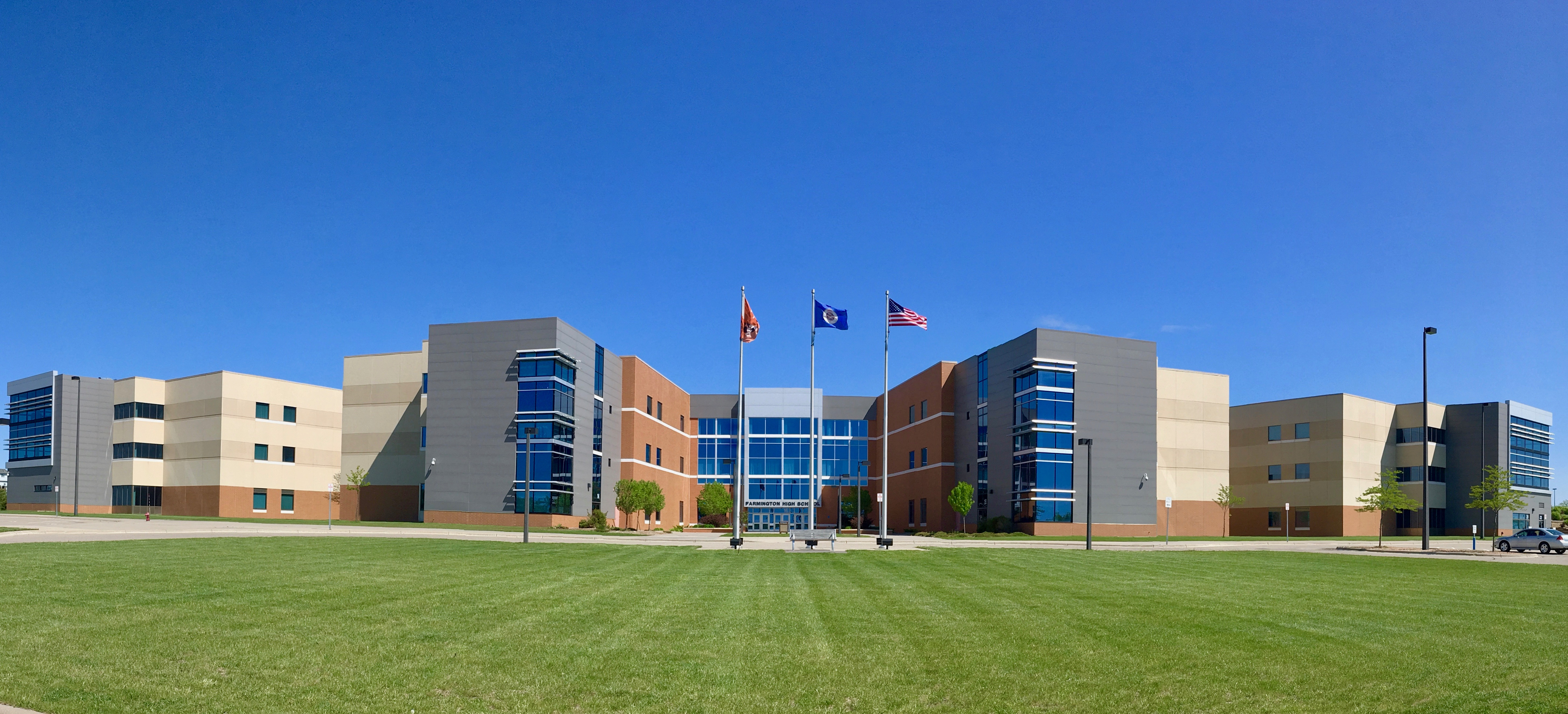
- Farmington High School South Entrance

Location
- 20655 Flagstaff Avenue; Farmington, Dakota County, Minnesota 55024; United States; 44.6491°N 93.1972°W

Information
- Other name: FHS
- Type: Public
- Established: 1973
- School board: ISD 192 Board of Education
- School district: Farmington Area Public Schools (ISD 192)
- NCES District ID: 2711820
- Superintendent: Jason Berg
- Principal: Ryan Meyer
- Teaching staff: 109.41 (on an FTE basis)
- Grades: 9 to 12
- Enrollment: 2,196 (2023-2024)
- Student to teacher ratio: 20.07
- Colors: Black & Orange
- Athletics conference: South Suburban
- Mascot: Siberian Tiger
- Nickname: Pouncer the Tiger
- Team name: Tigers
- Website: fhs.farmington.k12.mn.us

Farmington Senior High School is a public high school in Farmington, Minnesota, United States. It is part of Farmington Area Public Schools. The school was at 200 Denmark Avenue until 2009, when it moved to 20655 Flagstaff Avenue.

Farmington's team name is the Tigers.

== Curriculum ==
Through the Minnesota state Post Secondary Enrollment Options (PSEO) program, students may take classes at state colleges and universities.

== Notable alumni ==
- Shauna Grant (class of 1981), pornographic actress
- Mike Markuson (class of 1979), gridiron football coach
- Nick Meyer (class of 2014), personal finance content creator
- Brock Mogensen (class of 2018), NFL linebacker for the Dallas Cowboys
