= Cam Grandy =

American football player (born 2000)

No. 85 – Cincinnati Bengals
- Position: Tight end
- Roster status: Active

Personal information
- Born: November 19, 2000 (age 25); Benson, Illinois, U.S.
- Listed height: 6 ft 5 in (1.96 m)
- Listed weight: 253 lb (115 kg)

Career information
- High school: Fieldcrest (Minonk, Illinois)
- College: Missouri Western (2018–2022); Illinois State (2023)
- NFL draft: 2024: undrafted

Career history
- Cincinnati Bengals (2024–2025); Minnesota Vikings (2026)*; Cincinnati Bengals (2026–present)
- * Offseason or practice squad member only

Awards and highlights
- First-team FCS All-American (2023); First team All-MVFC (2023); Second team All-MIAA (2022)

Career NFL statistics as of 2025
- Receptions: 7
- Receiving yards: 35
- Stats at Pro Football Reference

Cam Grandy (born November 19, 2000) is an American professional football tight end for the Cincinnati Bengals of the National Football League (NFL). After going undrafted in 2024, he played for the Cincinnati Bengals for two seasons. He played college football for the NCAA Division II Missouri Western Griffons and the Division I FCS Illinois State Redbirds.

== Early life ==
Grandy was born on November 19, 2000, in Benson, Illinois. He attended Fieldcrest High School where he played defensive back, defensive end, quarterback and tight end; he was a first-team All-HOIC selection at quarterback, second-team at defensive back and honorable mention at defensive end. He was also named the News Tribune Small School Player of the Year, the Peoria Journal Star Offensive Player of the Year, Academic All-State and an honorable mention All-State selection. He committed to play college football for the NCAA Division II Missouri Western Griffons.

== College career ==
At Missouri Western, Grandy transitioned to being a tight end. As a freshman for the Griffons in 2018, he appeared in eight games, recording six receptions for 65 yards and a touchdown, and the following year, he played in all 12 games, four as a starter, and caught 20 passes for 261 yards and five touchdowns, being named honorable mention All-Mid-America Intercollegiate Athletics Association (MIAA). The 2020 season was canceled due to the COVID-19 pandemic, and Grandy did not play in the 2021 season, before returning in 2022 and catching 31 receptions for 275 yards while being named second-team All-MIAA.

Grandy transferred to the NCAA Division I FCS Illinois State Redbirds for a final season in 2023. He started all 11 games for the Redbirds, totaling 63 receptions for 612 yards and three touchdowns, being named first-team All-Missouri Valley Football Conference (MVFC), a consensus first-team FCS All-American, to the MVFC All-Newcomer team and the Illinois State Male Athlete of the Year.

== Professional career ==
Pre-draft measurables
Height	Weight	Arm length	Hand span	Wingspan	40-yard dash	10-yard split	20-yard split	20-yard shuttle	Three-cone drill	Vertical jump	Broad jump	Bench press
6 ft 4 5/8 in (1.95 m)	253 lb (115 kg)	32 1/2 in (0.83 m)	9 1/8 in (0.23 m)	6 ft 6 7/8 in (2.00 m)	4.90 s	1.65 s	2.80 s	4.57 s	7.34 s	28.5 in (0.72 m)	9 ft 3 in (2.82 m)	21 reps
All values from Pro Day

=== Cincinnati Bengals ===
After going unselected in the 2024 NFL draft, Grandy signed with the Cincinnati Bengals as an undrafted free agent. He was released on August 27, 2024, then re-signed to the practice squad the following day. He was elevated to the active roster on November 7, for the team's Week 10 game against the Baltimore Ravens, and made his NFL debut in the game. On November 15, Grandy was signed to the active roster.

On January 21, 2025, the Bengals signed Grandy to a one-year contract extension. He made five appearances (one start) for Cincinnati during the regular season, recording two receptions for seven scoreless yards.

On January 5, 2026, the Bengals signed Grandy to another one-year contract extension.

=== Minnesota Vikings ===
On September 1, 2026, Grandy was signed to the practice squad of the Minnesota Vikings.

=== Cincinnati Bengals (second stint) ===
On October 27, 2026, Grandy was signed by the Cincinnati Bengals off the Vikings practice squad.
