= P. J. Jules =

American football player (born 2001)

No. 37 – Cincinnati Bengals
- Position: Safety
- Roster status: Active

Personal information
- Born: May 14, 2001 (age 25); Orlando, Florida, U.S.
- Listed height: 6 ft 0 in (1.83 m)
- Listed weight: 203 lb (92 kg)

Career information
- High school: Jones (Orlando)
- College: Southern Illinois (2019–2023)
- NFL draft: 2024: undrafted

Career history
- Cincinnati Bengals (2024–present)

Awards and highlights
- First-team FCS All-American (2023); First team All-MVFC (2023); Second team All-MVFC (2022)
- Stats at Pro Football Reference

P. J. Jules (born May 14, 2001) is an American professional football safety for the Cincinnati Bengals of the National Football League (NFL). He played college football for the Southern Illinois Salukis.

== Early life ==
Jules was born on May 14, 2001, in Orlando, Florida. His parents were immigrants from Haiti. He spoke Haitian Creole before learning to speak English at age five. He grew up playing football as his father was a referee in a local league; his father died while visiting Haiti when Jules was in seventh grade. He attended Jones High School in Orlando where competed in football and track and field. He recorded 132 tackles as a senior while helping his school reach the Class 5A Region semifinals. A three-star recruit, Jules committed to play college football for the NCAA Division I FCS-level Southern Illinois Salukis.

== College career ==
Jules posted 14 tackles as a freshman at Southern Illinois in 2019, mainly on special teams. He then had 17 tackles in the 2020 season and was named honorable mention All-Missouri Valley Football Conference (MVFC) in 2021 after posting 74 tackles and six pass breakups in 13 games. He also recorded a 41-yard interception return touchdown against Kansas State during the 2021 season. He was named second-team All-MVFC in 2022, when he was the team leader in both tackles (66) and pass breakups. As a senior in 2023, Jules led the Salukis with 111 tackles and 11 pass breakups along with posting 13 tackles-for-loss, being named first-team FCS All-American. He was also sixth in voting for the Buck Buchanan Award as the best FCS defensive player nationally. After the season, Jules was invited to the Hula Bowl.

== Professional career ==
Pre-draft measurables
Height	Weight	Arm length	Hand span	Wingspan	20-yard shuttle	Vertical jump	Bench press
5 ft 11 7/8 in (1.83 m)	203 lb (92 kg)	32 in (0.81 m)	9 1/4 in (0.23 m)	6 ft 5 1/4 in (1.96 m)	4.32 s	34.5 in (0.88 m)	19 reps
All values from Pro Day

After going unselected in the 2024 NFL draft, Jules signed with the Cincinnati Bengals as an undrafted free agent. He was waived on August 27, 2024, then re-signed to the practice squad the following day. After spending the entire season on the practice squad, he signed a reserve/future contract with the Bengals on January 7, 2025.

Jules was a standout performer for the Bengals in training camp and preseason in 2025. He made 14 appearances for Cincinnati during the regular season, recording 18 combined tackles.

On January 5, 2026, the Bengals signed Jules to a one-year contract extension.
