= 2023 Missouri Valley Football Conference season =

American college football conference season

- League: NCAA Division I Football Championship Subdivision
- Sport: Football
- Duration: August 31, 2023 through January 7, 2024
- Teams: 12

2024 NFL Draft
- Top draft pick: Mason McCormick, G, South Dakota State
- Picked by: Pittsburgh Steelers (round 4, pick 119)

Regular season
- Champion Playoff Participants: South Dakota State North Dakota; North Dakota State; South Dakota; Southern Illinois; Youngstown State

Football seasons
- 2022 2024

2023 Missouri Valley Football Conference standings
	Conf.			Overall
Team	W		L	W		L
No. 1 South Dakota State $^	8	–	0	15	–	0
No. 4 South Dakota ^	7	–	1	10	–	3
No. 3 North Dakota State ^	5	–	3	11	–	4
No. 19 Youngstown State ^	5	–	3	8	–	5
No. 16 North Dakota ^	5	–	3	7	–	5
Northern Iowa	5	–	3	6	–	5
No. 12 Southern Illinois ^	4	–	4	8	–	5
Illinois State	4	–	4	6	–	5
Missouri State	3	–	5	4	–	7
Murray State	1	–	7	2	–	9
Indiana State	1	–	7	1	–	10
Western Illinois	0	–	8	0	–	11
$ – Conference champion; ^ – FCS playoff participant; Rankings from STATS Poll

The 2023 Missouri Valley Football Conference football season was the 38th season of college football play for the Missouri Valley Football Conference and part of the 2023 NCAA Division I FCS football season. This was the MVFC's first season with 12 teams, as the conference added Murray State over the offseason. It was also the last season with 12 teams for now, as it was announced in May 2023 that Western Illinois would be leaving the MVFC after the 2023 season for the Ohio Valley Conference.

South Dakota State made it to the National Championship and won their 2nd FCS title in program history and became the third MVFC team to win back to back titles. North Dakota State made the playoffs unseeded, and won their way into the semifinals where they lost to 2nd seeded Montana. South Dakota made the playoffs as the 3rd seed, and made it to the quarterfinals, where they lost to North Dakota State. Youngstown State and Southern Illinois made the playoffs unseeded as well, and made it to the 2nd round, losing to 8th seeded Villanova and 4th seeded Idaho. North Dakota made the playoffs unseeded and lost to Sacramento State in the opening round.

== Offseason ==
Over the offseason, the conference officially welcomed in their 12th league member. Murray State will begin their tenure as a MVFC member after joining the sister conference (Missouri Valley Conference) in the summer of 2022. The Racers arrive in the Valley from the Ohio Valley Conference.

== Coaching changes ==
=== Missouri State ===
On December 19, 2022, Ryan Beard was named the new head coach at Missouri State. Beard was previously the Bears defensive coordinator for the last three years. He takes over for Bobby Petrino who left the program for an eventual job at Texas A&M.

=== South Dakota State ===
On January 20, 2023, Jimmy Rogers was named the new head coach at South Dakota State. Rogers was promoted from defensive coordinator for the Jacks. Former coach John Stiegelmeier retired after the end of last season, leading South Dakota State for 26 seasons.

== Preseason ==
=== Preseason League Poll ===
The annual preseason poll; voted on by conference coaches, athletic directors, and media members.

Predicted finish	Team	Points (1st place votes)
1	South Dakota State	539 (44)
2	North Dakota State	492 (1)
3	Northern Iowa	409
4	North Dakota	399
5	Southern Illinois	337
6	Youngstown State	323
7	Illinois State	269
8	Missouri State	229
9	South Dakota	226
10	Indiana State	148
11	Murray State	74
12	Western Illinois	65

=== Preseason Individual Awards ===
Award	Player	School	Position	Year
First Team Offense	Mark Gronowski	South Dakota State	QB	Jr.
First Team Offense	Isaiah Davis	South Dakota State	RB	Sr.
First Team Offense	Justin Dinka	Indiana State	RB	RS Jr.
First Team Offense	Hunter Brozio	North Dakota State	FB	Sr.
First Team Offense	Jaxon Janke	South Dakota State	WR	Sr.
First Team Offense	Bo Belquist	North Dakota	WR	Sr.
First Team Offense	Bryce Oliver	Youngstown State	WR	Sr.
First Team Offense	Zach Heins	South Dakota State	TE	Sr.
First Team Offense	Mason McCormick	South Dakota State	OL	Sr.
First Team Offense	Garret Greenfield	South Dakota State	OL	Sr.
First Team Offense	Donny Ventrelli	North Dakota	OL	Sr.
First Team Offense	Jalen Sundell	North Dakota State	OL	Sr.
First Team Offense	Jaison Williams	Youngstown State	OL	Jr.
First Team Defense	Khristian Boyd	Northern Iowa	DL	RS Sr.
First Team Defense	Ben McNaboe	North Dakota	DL	Sr.
First Team Defense	Dylan Wudke	Youngstown State	DL	Sr.
First Team Defense	Eli Mostaert	North Dakota State	DL	Sr.
First Team Defense	Adam Bock	South Dakota State	LB	Sr.
First Team Defense	Brock Mogensen	South Dakota	LB	Sr.
First Team Defense	Stephen Hillis	South Dakota	LB	Sr.
First Team Defense	Branson Combs	Southern Illinois	LB	RS Sr.
First Team Defense	Woo Governor	Northern Iowa	DB	Sr.
First Team Defense	DyShawn Gales	South Dakota State	DB	Sr.
First Team Defense	PJ Jules	Southern Illinois	DB	RS Sr.
First Team Defense	Rylan Cole	Indiana State	DB	Jr.
First Team Defense	Myles Harden	South Dakota	DB	Jr.
First Team Special Teams	Matthew Cook	Northern Iowa	PK	Sr.
First Team Special Teams	Grant Burkett	Missouri State	P	Jr.
First Team Special Teams	Caden Bolz	Missouri State	LS	Jr.
First Team Special Teams	Jayden Price	North Dakota State	RS	Sr.
First Team Special Teams	Carter Bell	South Dakota	AP	Jr.

Award	Player	School	Position	Year
Second Team Offense	Theo Day	Northern Iowa	QB	RS Sr.
Second Team Offense	TaMerik Williams	North Dakota State	RB	Sr.
Second Team Offense	Travis Theis	South Dakota	RB	Jr.
Second Team Offense	Jacardia Wright	Missouri State	RB	Jr.
Second Team Offense	Mike Morgan	South Dakota State	FB	Sr.
Second Team Offense	D'Ante' Cox	Southern Illinois	WR	Sr.
Second Team Offense	Jadon Janke	South Dakota State	WR/RS	Sr.
Second Team Offense	Sam Schnee	Northern Iowa	WR	RS Sr.
Second Team Offense	Alex Allen	Northern Iowa	TE	RS Sr.
Second Team Offense	Joe Stoffel	North Dakota State	TE	Jr.
Second Team Offense	Jared Penning	Northern Iowa	OL	RS Jr.
Second Team Offense	Isaac Erbes	South Dakota	OL	So.
Second Team Offense	Jake Kubas	North Dakota State	OL	Jr.
Second Team Offense	Jose Vazquez IV	Indiana State	OL	RS Sr.
Second Team Offense	Brandon Westberg	North Dakota State	OL	So.
Second Team Offense	Hunter Zambrano	Illinois State	OL	So.
Second Team Defense	Will Mostaert	North Dakota State	DL	Sr.
Second Team Defense	Lucas Hunter	Indiana State	DL	Sr.
Second Team Defense	Cade Terveer	South Dakota State	DL	Sr.
Second Team Defense	Chris Fitzgerald	Youngstown State	DL	Jr.
Second Team Defense	Jason Freeman	South Dakota State	LB	Sr.
Second Team Defense	Juan DelaCruz	Western Illinois	LB	Jr.
Second Team Defense	Geoffrey Brown	Indiana State	LB	Jr.
Second Team Defense	Isaiah Stalbird	South Dakota State	LB	Sr.
Second Team Defense	Cole Wisniewski	North Dakota State	LB	Sr.
Second Team Defense	C.J. Siegel	North Dakota	DB/RS	Sr.
Second Team Defense	Dalys Beanum	South Dakota State	DB	Sr.
Second Team Defense	Jayden Price	North Dakota State	DB	Sr.
Second Team Defense	PJ Hall	Missouri State	DB	Jr.
Second Team Defense	Dillon Gearhart	Illinois State	DB	Jr.
Second Team Special Teams	Griffin Crosa	North Dakota State	PK	Sr.
Second Team Special Teams	Hunter Dustman	South Dakota State	P	Sr.
Second Team Special Teams	Sam Merryman	Youngstown State	LS	Jr.
Second Team Special Teams	Jalen Carr	Illinois State	AP	Jr.

== Rankings ==
Legend
	Improvement in ranking
	Drop in ranking
	Not ranked previous week
	No change in ranking from previous week
RV	Received votes but were not ranked in Top 25 of poll
т	Tied with team above or below also with this symbol

		Pre	Wk 1	Wk 2	Wk 3	Wk 4	Wk 5	Wk 6	Wk 7	Wk 8	Wk 9	Wk 10	Wk 11	Wk 12	Final
Illinois State	STATS Perform			RV					RV						
Illinois State	AFCA Coaches	RV	RV	25	RV	RV		RV	25	RV	RV	RV	RV	RV	RV
Indiana State	STATS Perform														
Indiana State	AFCA Coaches														
Missouri State	STATS Perform														
Missouri State	AFCA Coaches														
Murray State	STATS Perform														
Murray State	AFCA Coaches			RV											
North Dakota	STATS Perform	17	17	14	14	12	16	15	11	15	13	10	13	12	16
North Dakota	AFCA Coaches	18	15	13	14	11	15	15	9	17	15	12	17	14	16
North Dakota State	STATS Perform	2	2	2	2	2	7	6	14	12	11	12	9	8	3
North Dakota State	AFCA Coaches	2	2	2	2	2	8	7	15	11	10	13	9	7	3
Northern Iowa	STATS Perform	23	21	RV	RV	RV	RV	RV	RV	23	18	15	22	RV	RV
Northern Iowa	AFCA Coaches	20	20	RV	RV	RV	RV	RV	RV	RV	23	20	RV		
South Dakota	STATS Perform						15	10	6	4	9	6	5	3	4
South Dakota	AFCA Coaches						21	17	16	9	12	6	5	3	4
South Dakota State	STATS Perform	1	1	1	1	1	1	1	1	1	1	1	1	1	1
South Dakota State	AFCA Coaches	1	1	1	1	1	1	1	1	1	1	1	1	1	1
Southern Illinois	STATS Perform	RV	24	15	12	10	6	13	12	11	10	11	16	14	12
Southern Illinois	AFCA Coaches	RV	23	18	13	10	5	13	12	12	11	15	20т	17	13
Western Illinois	STATS Perform														
Western Illinois	AFCA Coaches														
Youngstown State	STATS Perform	RV	25	25	24	23	RV	23	25	24	22	22	25	21	19
Youngstown State	AFCA Coaches	RV	25	RV	24	19	RV	20т	RV	RV	RV	RV	RV	23	21

== Schedule ==
Index to colors and formatting
MVFC member won
MVFC member lost
MVFC teams in **bold**

All times Central time.

† denotes Homecoming game
^ denotes AP Poll ranking for FBS teams

=== Regular season schedule ===
==== Week 1 ====
Date	Time	Visiting team	Home team	Site	TV	Result	Attendance	Ref.
August 31	6:00 p.m.	Eastern Illinois	**Indiana State**	Memorial Stadium • Terre Haute, IN	ESPN+	**L** 0–27	4,355	
August 31	6:30 p.m.	Valparaiso	No. RV **Youngstown State**	Stambaugh Stadium • Youngstown, OH	ESPN+	**W** 52–10	8,593	
August 31	7:00 p.m.	Western Oregon	No. 1 **South Dakota State**	Dana J. Dykhouse Stadium • Brookings, SD	ESPN+	**W** 45–7	16,258	
August 31	7:00 p.m.	**South Dakota**	Missouri	Faurot Field at Memorial Stadium • Columbia, MO	SECN	**L** 10–35	50,434	
September 1	7:00 p.m.	**Missouri State**	Kansas	David Booth Kansas Memorial Stadium • Lawrence, KS	Big 12 NOW, ESPN+	**L** 17–48	41,091	
September 2	12:00 p.m.	Dayton	**Illinois State**	Hancock Stadium • Normal, IL	ESPN+	**W** 41–0	6,740	
September 2	1:00 p.m.	No. 23 **Northern Iowa**	Iowa State	Jack Trice Stadium • Ames, IA	Big 12 NOW, ESPN+	**L** 9–30	58,248	
September 2	2:30 p.m.	Eastern Washington	No. 2 **North Dakota State**	U.S. Bank Stadium • Minneapolis, MN	ESPN+	**W** 35–10	22,546	
September 2	3:00 p.m.	Drake	No. 17 **North Dakota**	Alerus Center • Grand Forks, ND	ESPN+	**W** 55–7	8,503	
September 2	6:00 p.m.	No. RV Austin Peay	No. RV **Southern Illinois**	Saluki Stadium • Carbondale, IL	ESPN+	**W** 49–23	8,327	
September 2	6:00 p.m.	Presbyterian	**Murray State**	Roy Stewart Stadium • Murray, KY	ESPN+	**W** 41–10	6,953	
September 2	8:00 p.m.	**Western Illinois**	New Mexico State	Aggie Memorial Stadium • Las Cruces, NM	ESPN+	**L** 21–58	17,943	
^{#}Rankings from Stats Perform. All times are in Central Time.

==== Week 2 ====
Date	Time	Visiting team	Home team	Site	TV	Result	Attendance	Ref.
September 7	6:30 p.m.	**Murray State**	No. RV^ Louisville	L&N Federal Credit Union Stadium • Louisville, KY	ACCN	**L** 0–56	45,273	
September 8	6:00 p.m.	**Indiana State**	Indiana	Memorial Stadium • Bloomington, IN	BTN	**L** 7–41	42,775	
September 9	12:00 p.m.	No. 25 **Youngstown State**	No. 5^ Ohio State	Ohio Stadium • Columbus, OH	BTN	**L** 7–35	102,897	
September 9	1:00 p.m.	No. RV St. Thomas	**South Dakota**	DakotaDome • Vermillion, SD	ESPN+	**W** 24–0	6,126	
September 9	2:30 p.m.	Maine	No. 2 **North Dakota State**	Fargodome • Fargo, ND	ESPN+	**W** 44–7	15,044	
September 9	2:30 p.m.	No. 24 **Southern Illinois**	Northern Illinois	Huskie Stadium • DeKalb, IL	ESPN+	**W** 14–11	13,114	
September 9	3:00 p.m.	**Illinois State**	**Western Illinois**	Hanson Field • Macomb, IL	ESPN+	**ILST** 34–18	3,648	
September 9	3:00 p.m.	Northern Arizona	No. 17 **North Dakota**	Alerus Center • Grand Forks, ND	ESPN+	**W** 37–22	10,009	
September 9	4:00 p.m.	No. 12 Weber State	No. 21 **Northern Iowa**	UNI-Dome • Cedar Falls, IA	ESPN+	**L** 17–34	7,967	
September 9	6:00 p.m.	**Missouri State**	No. RV UT Martin	Graham Stadium • Martin, TN	ESPN+	**L** 31–38	6,104	
September 9	6:00 p.m.	No. 3 Montana State	No. 1 **South Dakota State**	Dana J. Dykhouse Stadium • Brookings, SD	ESPN+	**W** 20–16	19,332	
^{#}Rankings from Stats Perform. All times are in Central Time.

==== Week 3 ====
Date	Time	Visiting team	Home team	Site	TV	Result	Attendance	Ref.
September 16	11:00 a.m.	No. 14 **North Dakota**	Boise State	Albertsons Stadium • Boise, ID	FS1	**L** 18–42	35,610	
September 16	1:00 p.m.	Lamar	**South Dakota**	DakotaDome • Vermillion, SD	ESPN+	**W** 35–6	5,618	
September 16	1:00 p.m.	Robert Morris	No. 25 **Youngstown State**	Stambaugh Stadium • Youngstown, OH	ESPN+	**W** 48–28	12,826	
September 16	2:00 p.m.	No. RV **Illinois State**	Eastern Illinois	O'Brien Field • Charleston, IL	ESPN+	**L** 13–14	6,602	
September 16	2:00 p.m.	**Indiana State**	Ball State	Scheumann Stadium • Muncie, IN	ESPN+	**L** 7–45	15,054	
September 16	2:30 p.m.	No. RV Central Arkansas	No. 2 **North Dakota State**	Fargodome • Fargo, ND	ESPN+	**W** 49–31	15,016	
September 16	2:30 p.m.	Drake	No. 1 **South Dakota State**	Target Field • Minneapolis, MN	ESPN+	**W** 70–7	18,174	
September 16	5:00 p.m.	No. RV **Northern Iowa**	Idaho State	Holt Arena • Pocatello, ID	ESPN+	**W** 41–17	N/A	
September 16	6:00 p.m.	Lindenwood	**Western Illinois**	Hanson Field • Macomb, IL	ESPN+	**L** 40–43	3,548	
September 16	6:00 p.m.	No. 15 **Southern Illinois**	No. 13 Southeast Missouri State	Houck Stadium • Cape Girardeau, MO	ESPN+	**W** 26–25	8,613	
September 16	6:00 p.m.	**Murray State**	Middle Tennessee State	Johnny "Red" Floyd Stadium • Murfreesboro, TN	ESPN+	**L** 14–35	16,605	
^{#}Rankings from Stats Perform. All times are in Central Time.

Date	Bye Week
September 16	Missouri State

==== Week 4 ====
Date	Time	Visiting team	Home team	Site	TV	Result	Attendance	Ref.
September 23	12:00 p.m.	Lindenwood	**Illinois State**	Hancock Stadium • Normal, IL	ESPN+	**W** 48–17	13,391	
September 23	2:00 p.m.	Utah Tech	**Missouri State**	Robert W. Plaster Stadium • Springfield, MO	ESPN+	**W** 59–14	11,002	
September 23	7:00 p.m.	**Western Illinois**	Southern Utah	Eccles Coliseum • Cedar City, UT	ESPN+	**L** 17–37	6,504	
^{#}Rankings from Stats Perform. All times are in Central Time.

Date	Bye Week								
September 23	No. 24 Youngstown State	No. RV Northern Iowa	No. 2 North Dakota State	No. 1 South Dakota State	South Dakota	No. 14 North Dakota	Indiana State	No. 12 Southern Illinois	Murray State

==== Week 5 ====
Date	Time	Visiting team	Home team	Site	TV	Result	Attendance	Ref.
September 30	1:00 p.m.	**South Dakota**	No. 2 **North Dakota State**†	Fargodome • Fargo, ND	ESPN+	**USD** 24–19	18,342	
September 30	1:00 p.m.	No. 23 **Youngstown State**	No. RV **Northern Iowa**	UNI-Dome • Cedar Falls, IA	ESPN+	**UNI** 44–41	10,346	
September 30	2:00 p.m.	No. 12 **North Dakota**	No. 1 **South Dakota State**	Dana J. Dykhouse Stadium • Brookings, SD	ESPN+	**SDSU** 42–21	19,231	
September 30	4:00 p.m.	**Missouri State**	No. 10 **Southern Illinois**	Saluki Stadium • Carbondale, IL	ESPN+	**SIU** 33–20	10,359	
September 30	6:00 p.m.	**Indiana State**	**Murray State**	Roy Stewart Stadium • Murray, KY	ESPN+	**MUST** 30–28	13,213	
^{#}Rankings from Stats Perform. All times are in Central Time.

Date	Bye Week	
September 30	Western Illinois	Illinois State

==== Week 6 ====
Date	Time	Visiting team	Home team	Site	TV	Result	Attendance	Ref.
October 7	1:00 p.m.	**Western Illinois**	No. 16 **North Dakota**†	Alerus Center • Grand Forks, ND	ESPN+	**UND** 49–10	9,758	
October 7	2:00 p.m.	**Murray State**	No. 15 **South Dakota**	DakotaDome • Vermillion, SD	ESPN+	**USD** 38–7	7,907	
October 7	2:00 p.m.	No. 7 **North Dakota State**	**Missouri State**	Robert W. Plaster Stadium • Springfield, MO	ESPN+	**NDSU** 38–10	8,727	
October 7	5:00 p.m.	No. 6 **Southern Illinois**	No. RV **Youngstown State**	Stambaugh Stadium • Youngstown, OH	ESPN+	**YSU** 31–3	9,767	
October 7	6:00 p.m.	No. 1 **South Dakota State**	**Illinois State**	Hancock Stadium • Normal, IL	ESPN+	**SDSU** 40–21	8,272	
October 7	7:00 p.m.	No. RV **Northern Iowa**	**Indiana State**	Memorial Stadium • Terre Haute, IN	ESPN+	**UNI** 27–20	3,228	
^{#}Rankings from Stats Perform. All times are in Central Time.

==== Week 7 ====
Date	Time	Visiting team	Home team	Site	TV	Result	Attendance	Ref.
October 14	1:00 p.m.	No. 6 **North Dakota State**	No. 15 **North Dakota**	Alerus Center • Grand Forks, ND	ESPN+	**UND** 49–24	13,091	
October 14	1:00 p.m.	No. 23 **Youngstown State**	No. 10 **South Dakota**	DakotaDome • Vermillion, SD	ESPN+	**USD** 34–31	3,608	
October 14	2:00 p.m.	No. RV **Northern Iowa**	No. 1 **South Dakota State**	Dana J. Dykhouse Stadium • Brookings, SD	ESPN+	**SDSU** 41–6	19,357	
October 14	2:00 p.m.	No. 13 **Southern Illinois**	**Murray State**†	Roy Stewart Stadium • Murray, KY	ESPN+	**SIU** 27–6	15,868	
October 14	3:00 p.m.	**Missouri State**	**Western Illinois**	Hanson Field • Macomb, IL	ESPN+	**MOST** 48–7	2,809	
October 14	3:00 p.m.	**Indiana State**	**Illinois State**	Hancock Stadium • Normal, IL	ESPN+	**ILST** 44–7	N/A	
^{#}Rankings from Stats Perform. All times are in Central Time.

==== Week 8 ====
Date	Time	Visiting team	Home team	Site	TV	Result	Attendance	Ref.
October 21	1:00 p.m.	No. 6 **South Dakota**	**Indiana State**†	Memorial Stadium • Terre Haute, IN	ESPN+	**USD** 17–3	4,908	
October 21	2:00 p.m.	No. 1 **South Dakota State**	No. 12 **Southern Illinois**†	Saluki Stadium • Carbondale, IL	ESPN+	**SDSU** 17–10	11,927	
October 21	2:00 p.m.	No. RV **Illinois State**	No. 25 **Youngstown State**	Stambaugh Stadium • Youngstown, OH	ESPN+	**YSU** 41–38	10,022	
October 21	2:00 p.m.	**Murray State**	**Missouri State**	Robert W. Plaster Stadium • Springfield, IL	ESPN+	**MOST** 28–24	11,386	
October 21	2:30 p.m.	**Western Illinois**	No. 14 **North Dakota State**	Fargodome • Fargo, ND	ESPN+	**NDSU** 52–7	14,255	
October 21	4:00 p.m.	No. 11 **North Dakota**	No. RV **Northern Iowa**†	UNI-Dome • Cedar Falls, IA	ESPN3	**UNI** 27–0	10,677	
^{#}Rankings from Stats Perform. All times are in Central Time.

==== Week 9 ====
Date	Time	Visiting team	Home team	Site	TV	Result	Attendance	Ref.
October 28	12:00 p.m.	No. 23 **Northern Iowa**	**Illinois State**	Hancock Stadium • Normal, IL	ESPN+	**UNI** 24–21	N/A	
October 28	1:00 p.m.	No. 11 **Southern Illinois**	**Western Illinois**	Hanson Field • Macomb, IL	ESPN+	**SIU** 63–0	2,636	
October 28	1:00 p.m.	**Missouri State**	No. 24 **Youngstown State**	Stambaugh Stadium • Youngstown, OH	ESPN+	**YSU** 44–28	9,880	
October 28	1:00 p.m.	**Indiana State**	No. 15 **North Dakota**	Alerus Center • Grand Forks, ND	ESPN+	**UND** 36–33 ^{OT}	11,125	
October 28	1:00 p.m.	No. 1 **South Dakota State**	No. 4 **South Dakota**	DakotaDome • Vermillion, SD	ESPN+	**SDSU** 37–3	9,458	
October 28	2:30 p.m.	**Murray State**	No. 12 **North Dakota State**	Fargodome • Fargo, ND	ESPN+	**NDSU** 38–6	13,876	
^{#}Rankings from Stats Perform. All times are in Central Time.

==== Week 10 ====
Date	Time	Visiting team	Home team	Site	TV	Result	Attendance	Ref.
November 4	12:00 p.m.	No. 22 **Youngstown State**	**Indiana State**	Memorial Stadium • Terre Haute, IN	ESPN+	**YSU** 19–7	4,798	
November 4	1:00 p.m.	**Western Illinois**	No. 18 **Northern Iowa**	UNI-Dome • Cedar Falls, IA	ESPN+	**UNI** 50–6	8,051	
November 4	1:00 p.m.	No. 9 **South Dakota**	No. 10 **Southern Illinois**	Saluki Stadium • Carbondale, IL	ESPN+	**USD** 14–7	7,106	
November 4	1:00 p.m.	No. 13 **North Dakota**	**Murray State**	Roy Stewart Stadium • Murray, KY	ESPN+	**UND** 45–31	6,217	
November 4	2:00 p.m.	No. 11 **North Dakota State**	No. 1 **South Dakota State**	Dana J. Dykhouse Stadium • Brookings, SD	ESPN+	**SDSU** 33–16	19,431	
November 4	2:00 p.m.	**Illinois State**	**Missouri State**	Robert W. Plaster Stadium • Springfield, MO	ESPN+	**ILST** 36–35	7,700	
^{#}Rankings from Stats Perform. All times are in Central Time.

==== Week 11 ====
Date	Time	Visiting team	Home team	Site	TV	Result	Attendance	Ref.
November 11	11:00 a.m.	**Murray State**	**Illinois State**	Hancock Stadium • Normal, IL	ESPN+	**ILST** 44–7	5,623	
November 11	11:00 a.m.	No. 1 **South Dakota State**	No. 22 **Youngstown State**	Stambaugh Stadium • Youngstown, OH	ESPN+	**SDSU** 34–0	9,303	
November 11	1:00 p.m.	**Western Illinois**	**Indiana State**	Memorial Stadium • Terre Haute, IN	ESPN+	**INST** 27–6	3,151	
November 11	1:00 p.m.	No. 10 **North Dakota**	No. 6 **South Dakota**	DakotaDome • Vermillion, SD	ESPN+	**USD** 14–10	6,834	
November 11	2:00 p.m.	No. 15 **Northern Iowa**	**Missouri State**	Robert W. Plaster Stadium • Springfield, MO	ESPN+	**MOST** 35–16	6,898	
November 11	2:30 p.m.	No. 11 **Southern Illinois**	No. 12 **North Dakota State**	Fargodome • Fargo, ND	ESPN+	**NDSU** 34–10	14,191	
^{#}Rankings from Stats Perform. All times are in Central Time.

==== Week 12 ====
Date	Time	Visiting team	Home team	Site	TV	Result	Attendance	Ref.
November 18	1:00 p.m.	No. 5 **South Dakota**	**Western Illinois**	Hanson Field • Macomb, IL	ESPN+	**USD** 48–6	1,935	
November 18	1:00 p.m.	**Illinois State**	No. 13 **North Dakota**	Alerus Center • Grand Forks, ND	ESPN+	**UND** 22–21	9,238	
November 18	1:00 p.m.	**Indiana State**	No. 16 **Southern Illinois**	Saluki Stadium • Carbondale, IL	ESPN+	**SIU** 38–9	N/A	
November 18	1:00 p.m.	No. 25 **Youngstown State**	**Murray State**	Roy Stewart Stadium • Murray, KY	ESPN+	**YSU** 34–17	5,957	
November 18	2:00 p.m.	**Missouri State**	No. 1 **South Dakota State**	Dana J. Dykhouse Stadium • Brookings, SD	ESPN+	**SDSU** 35–17	15,637	
November 18	4:00 p.m.	No. 9 **North Dakota State**	No. 22 **Northern Iowa**	UNI-Dome • Cedar Falls, IA	ESPN+	**NDSU** 48–27	9,852	
^{#}Rankings from Stats Perform. All times are in Central Time.

=== FCS Playoffs ===
In 2023, six teams made the FCS Playoffs. South Dakota State (No. 1) and South Dakota (No. 3) both received byes; while North Dakota, North Dakota State, Southern Illinois, and Youngstown State were unseeded and played in the opening round. Below are the games in which they played.

All times Central time. Tournament seedings in parentheses.

==== First round ====
Date	Time	Visiting team	Home team	Site	TV	Result	Attendance	Ref.
November 25	12:00 p.m.	No. 15 Sacramento State (Big Sky)	No. 12 **North Dakota**	Alerus Center • Grand Forks, ND	ESPN+	**L** 35–42	6,522	
November 25	2:00 p.m.	No. RV Nicholls (Southland)	No. 14 **Southern Illinois**	Saluki Stadium • Carbondale, IL	ESPN+	**W** 35–0	4,576	
November 25	2:30 p.m.	No. RV Drake (PFL)	No. 8 **North Dakota State**	Fargodome • Fargo, ND	ESPN+	**W** 66–3	7,798	
November 25	4:00 p.m.	No. RV Duquesne (Northeast)	No. 21 **Youngstown State**	Stambaugh Stadium • Youngstown, OH	ESPN+	**W** 40–7	3,866	
^{#}Rankings from Stats Perform. All times are in Central Time.

==== Second round ====
Date	Time	Visiting team	Home team	Site	TV	Result	Attendance	Ref.
December 2	11:00 a.m.	No. 21 **Youngstown State**	No. 6 (8) Villanova (CAA)	Villanova Stadium • Villanova, PA	ESPN+	**L** 28–45	2,105	
December 2	1:00 p.m.	No. 15 Sacramento State (Big Sky)	No. 3 (3) **South Dakota**	DakotaDome • Vermillion, SD	ESPN+	**W** 34–24	6,288	
December 2	1:00 p.m.	No. 17 Mercer (SoCon)	No. 1 (1) **South Dakota State**	Dana J. Dykhouse Stadium • Brookings, SD	ESPN+	**W** 41–0	10,171	
December 2	2:00 p.m.	No. 8 **North Dakota State**	No. 5 (6) Montana State (Big Sky)	Bobcat Stadium • Bozeman, MT	ESPN+	**W** 35–34 ^{OT}	17,247	
December 2	9:00 p.m.	No. 14 **Southern Illinois**	No. 4 (4) Idaho (Big Sky)	Kibbie Dome • Moscow, ID	ESPN+	**L** 17–20	9,224	
^{#}Rankings from Stats Perform. All times are in Central Time.

==== Quarterfinals ====
Date	Time	Visiting team	Home team	Site	TV	Result	Attendance	Ref.
December 9	11:00 a.m.	No. 6 (8) Villanova (CAA)	No. 1 (1) **South Dakota State**	Dana J. Dykhouse Stadium • Brookings, SD	ESPN	**W** 23–12	10,216	
December 9	1:30 p.m.	No. 8 **North Dakota State**	No. 3 (3) **South Dakota**	DakotaDome • Vermillion, SD	ABC	**NDSU** 45–17	9,141	
^{#}Rankings from Stats Perform. All times are in Central Time.

==== Semifinals ====
Date	Time	Visiting team	Home team	Site	TV	Result	Attendance	Ref.
December 15	6:00 p.m.	No. 9 (5) Albany (CAA)	No. 1 **South Dakota State**	Dana J. Dykhouse Stadium • Brookings, SD	ESPN2	**W** 59–0	12,265	
December 16	3:30 p.m.	No. 8 **North Dakota State**	No. 2 (2) Montana (Big Sky)	Washington-Grizzly Stadium • Missoula, MT	ESPN2	**L** 29–31 ^{2OT}	26,544	
^{#}Rankings from Stats Perform. All times are in Central Time.

==== National Championship ====
Date	Time	Visiting team	Home team	Site	TV	Result	Attendance	Ref.
January 7	1:00 p.m.	No. 2 (2) Montana (Big Sky)	No. 1 (1) **South Dakota State**	Toyota Stadium • Frisco, TX	ABC	**W** 23–3	19,512	
^{#}Rankings from Stats Perform. All times are in Central Time.

== MVFC records vs other conferences ==
2023-24 records against non-conference foes:

FCS Power Conferences	Record
Big Sky	4–1
CAA	1–0
FCS Power Total	5–1
Other FCS Conferences	Record
Big South	1–0
Ivy League	None
MEAC	None
Northeast	None
OVC	2–4
Patriot	None
PFL	6–0
SoCon	None
Southland	1–0
SWAC	None
UAC (ASUN–WAC)	3–1
Other FCS Total	13–5
Other Division I Opponents	Record
Football Bowl Subdivision	1–10
Total Division I	19–16
Other NCAA Opponents	Record
Division II	1–0
Total Non-Conference Record	20–16

Post Season

FCS Power Conferences	Record
Big Sky	3–3
CAA	2–1
FCS Power Total	5–4
Other FCS Conferences	Record
Big South	None
Ivy League	None
MEAC	None
Northeast	1–0
OVC	None
Patriot	None
PFL	1–0
SoCon	1–0
Southland	1–0
SWAC	None
UAC (ASUN–WAC)	None
Other FCS Total	4–0
Total Postseason Record	9–4

== Awards and honors ==
=== Player of the week honors ===
Week	Offensive			Defensive			Special Teams			Freshman		
Week	Player	Position	Team	Player	Position	Team	Player	Position	Team	Player	Position	Team
Week 1 (Sept. 4)	Nic Baker	QB	SIU	Cole Wisniewski	S	NDSU	Kaedin Steindorf	P	NDSU	Tyshon King	RB	YSU
Week 2 (Sept. 11)	Mason Blakemore	RB	ILST	Nick Gaes	DT	USD	Griffin Crosa	K	NDSU	Griffin Wilde	WR	SDSU
Week 2 (Sept. 11)	Mason Blakemore	RB	ILST	PJ Jules	S	SIU	Griffin Crosa	K	NDSU	Griffin Wilde	WR	SDSU
Week 3 (Sept. 18)	Nic Baker	QB	SIU	PJ Jules	S	SIU	Tucker Large	PR/S	SDSU	Tyshon King	RB	YSU
Week 4 (Sept. 25)	Jacob Clark	QB	MOST	Caleb Blake	CB	MOST	Ian Wagner	K/P	ILST	Jayden Becks	RB	MOST
Week 5 (Oct. 2)	Theo Day	QB	UNI	Dennis Shorter	SS	USD	Orion Phillips	P	MUST	Plez Lawrence	RB	INST
Week 5 (Oct. 2)	Carter Bell	WR	USD	Dennis Shorter	SS	USD	Orion Phillips	P	MUST	Plez Lawrence	RB	INST
Week 6 (Oct. 9)	Isaiah Davis	RB	SDSU	Logan Kopp	LB	NDSU	Jake Andjelic	PK	INST	Tyshon King	RB	YSU
Week 7 (Oct. 16)	Gaven Ziebarth	RB	UND	Isaiah Stalbird	LB	SDSU	Will Leyland	PK	USD	Owen Rozanc	PK	MOST
Week 7 (Oct. 16)	Gaven Ziebarth	RB	UND	Isaiah Stalbird	LB	SDSU	Luke Skokna	RB/RS	UND	Owen Rozanc	PK	MOST
Week 8 (Oct. 23)	Amauri Pesek-Hickson	RB	UNI	Devin Goree	DL	MOST	Andrew Lastovka	PK	YSU	Charles Pierre Jr.	RB	USD
Week 9 (Oct. 30)	Mitch Davidson	QB	YSU	Logan Kopp	LB	NDSU	Hunter Dustman	PK/P	SDSU	C.J. Elrichs	PK	UND
Week 10 (Nov. 6)	Tommy Schuster	QB	UND	Brendan Webb	LB	USD	Hunter Dustman	K/P	SDSU	Mason Blakemore	QB	ILST
Week 11 (Nov. 13)	Raylen Sharpe	WR	MOST	Garret Ollendieck	LB	INST	Red Wilson	WR/RS	UND	Amir Abdullah	LB	ILST
Week 12 (Nov. 20)	Jadon Janke	WR	SDSU	Cole Wisniewski	S	NDSU	Will Leyland	PK	USD	Tim Varga	DE	SIU
Week 12 (Nov. 20)	Mark Gronowski	QB	SDSU	Cole Wisniewski	S	NDSU	Will Leyland	PK	USD	Tim Varga	DE	SIU

=== Players of the Year ===
On November 27, 2023, the Missouri Valley Football Conference released their Players of the Year and All-Conference Honors.

==== Offensive Player of the Year ====
Two players were named as Offensive Player of the Year.

- Mark Gronowski, QB (Jr - South Dakota State)
- Isaiah Davis, RB (Sr - South Dakota State)

==== Defensive Player of the Year ====
- Brock Mogensen, LB (Sr - South Dakota)

==== Newcomer of the Year ====
- Mason Blakemore, RB (Jr - Illinois State)

==== Freshman of the Year ====
- Tye Niekamp, LB (RS-Fr - Illinois State)

==== Coach of the Year ====
- Bob Nielson (South Dakota)

=== All-Conference Teams ===
Award	Player	School	Position	Year
First Team Offense	Mark Gronowski	South Dakota State	QB	Jr
First Team Offense	Isaiah Davis	South Dakota State	RB	Sr
First Team Offense	Mason Blakemore	Illinois State	RB	Jr
First Team Offense	Hunter Brozio	North Dakota State	FB	Sr
First Team Offense	Cam Grandy	Illinois State	TE	Sr
First Team Offense	Jadon Janke	South Dakota State	WR	Sr
First Team Offense	Sam Schnee	Northern Iowa	WR	RS-Sr
First Team Offense	Raylen Sharpe	Missouri State	WR	Jr
First Team Offense	Garret Greenfield	South Dakota State	OL	Sr
First Team Offense	Jake Kubas	North Dakota State	OL	Sr
First Team Offense	Mason McCormick	South Dakota State	OL	Sr
First Team Offense	Jared Penning	Northern Iowa	OL	RS-Jr
First Team Offense	Jalen Sundell	North Dakota State	OL	Sr
First Team Defense	Khristian Boyd	Northern Iowa	DL	RS-Sr
First Team Defense	Dylan Hendricks	North Dakota State	DL	Sr
First Team Defense	Cade Terveer	South Dakota State	DL	Sr
First Team Defense	Brendan Webb	South Dakota	DL	Sr
First Team Defense	Amir Abdullah	Illinois State	LB	Jr
First Team Defense	Jason Freeman	South Dakota State	LB	Sr
First Team Defense	Logan Kopp	North Dakota State	LB	So
First Team Defense	Brock Mogensen	South Dakota	LB	Sr
First Team Defense	Woo Governor	Northern Iowa	DB	Sr
First Team Defense	PJ Jules	Southern Illinois	DB	Sr
First Team Defense	Tucker Large	South Dakota State	DB	So
First Team Defense	Cole Wisniewski	North Dakota State	DB	Sr
First Team Special Teams	Matthew Cook	Northern Iowa	PK	Sr
First Team Special Teams	Grant Burkett	Missouri State	P	Jr
First Team Special Teams	Hunter Brozio	North Dakota State	LS	Sr
First Team Special Teams	Luke Skokna	North Dakota	RS	Sr
First Team Special Teams	Amar Johnson	South Dakota State	AP	Jr

Award	Player	School	Position	Year
Second Team Offense	Cam Miller	North Dakota State	QB	Sr
Second Team Offense	Tyshon King	Youngstown State	RB	Sr
Second Team Offense	Jacardia Wright	Missouri State	RB	Jr
Second Team Offense	Mike Morgan	South Dakota State	FB	Sr
Second Team Offense	Travis Theis	South Dakota	FB	Jr
Second Team Offense	Zach Heins	South Dakota State	TE	Sr
Second Team Offense	Bo Belquist	North Dakota	WR	Sr
Second Team Offense	Bryce Oliver	Youngstown State	WR	Sr
Second Team Offense	Daniel Sobkowicz	Illinois State	WR	So
Second Team Offense	Joey Lombard	South Dakota	OL	Jr
Second Team Offense	Gus Miller	South Dakota State	OL	Jr
Second Team Offense	Donny Ventrelli	North Dakota	OL	5th
Second Team Offense	Jaison Williams	Youngstown State	OL	Jr
Second Team Offense	Hunter Zambrano	Illinois State	OL	Jr
Second Team Defense	Josh Dinga	Illinois State	DL	RS-Sr
Second Team Defense	Eli Mostaert	North Dakota State	DL	Sr
Second Team Defense	Ryan Van Marel	South Dakota State	DL	Sr
Second Team Defense	Dylan Wudke	Youngstown State	DL	Sr
Second Team Defense	Branson Combs	Southern Illinois	LB	Jr
Second Team Defense	Garret Ollendieck	Indiana State	LB	Jr
Second Team Defense	Wyatt Pedigo	North Dakota	LB	Jr
Second Team Defense	Isaiah Stalbird	South Dakota State	LB	Sr
Second Team Defense	Maddix Blackwell	Indiana State	DB	RS-So
Second Team Defense	Dyshawn Gales	South Dakota State	DB	Sr
Second Team Defense	Troy Jakubec	Youngstown State	DB	Jr
Second Team Defense	Todric McGee	Missouri State	DB	So
Second Team Defense	C.J. Siegel	North Dakota	DB	5th
Second Team Special Teams	Will Leyland	South Dakota	PK	So
Second Team Special Teams	Hunter Dustman	South Dakota State	P	Sr
Second Team Special Teams	Kaydon Olivia	South Dakota State	LS	So
Second Team Special Teams	Tucker Large	South Dakota State	RS	So
Second Team Special Teams	Carter Bell	South Dakota	AP	Jr

=== National Awards ===
On November 21, 2023, STATS Perform released their list of finalists for the Walter Payton Award, Buck Buchanan Award, Jerry Rice Award, and the Eddie Robinson Award, respectively. Finalists are listed by order they appeared in the STATS Perform article.

==== Walter Payton Award ====
The Walter Payton Award is given to the best FCS offensive player. The MVFC's own Mark Gronowski won the award (QB - South Dakota State). Here were the other MVFC finalists:

- Cam Miller (QB - North Dakota State)
- Isaiah Davis (RB - South Dakota State)

==== Buck Buchanan Award ====
The Buck Buchanan Award is given to the best FCS defensive player. Here were the MVFC finalists:

- Amir Abdullah (LB - Illinois State)
- Logan Kopp (LB - North Dakota State)
- Brock Mogensen (LB - South Dakota)
- PJ Jules (DB - Southern Illinois)

==== Jerry Rice Award ====
The Jerry Rice Award is given to the best FCS freshman player. Here were the MVFC finalists:

- Tye Niekamp (LB - Illinois State)

==== Eddie Robinson Award ====
The Eddie Robinson Award is given to the best FCS head coach. The MVFC's own Jimmy Rogers won the award, and it was announced on December 7, 2023. Here were the MVFC finalists:

- Bob Nielson (South Dakota)
- Jimmy Rogers (South Dakota State)

=== All-Americans ===
	AP 1st Team	AP 2nd Team	AP 3rd Team	AFCA 1st Team	AFCA 2nd Team	STATS 1st Team	STATS 2nd Team	STATS 3rd Team	ADA
Amir Abdullah, LB, Illinois State			✓					✓	
Brendan Webb, DL, South Dakota			✓		✓				
Brock Mogensen, LB, South Dakota	✓			✓		✓			
Cam Grandy, TE, Illinois State	✓			✓		✓			✓
Cam Miller, QB, North Dakota State							✓		
Cole Rusk, TE, Murray State			✓						
Cole Wisniewski, DB, North Dakota State	✓			✓		✓			✓
Garret Greenfield, OL, South Dakota State	✓			✓		✓			✓
Grant Burkett, P, Missouri State		✓							
Hunter Brozio, LS, North Dakota State				✓			✓		
Isaiah Davis, RB, South Dakota State	✓			✓		✓			
Jake Kubas, OL, North Dakota State			✓			✓			
Jalen Sundell, OL, North Dakota State				✓				✓	
Jared Penning, OL, Northern Iowa								✓	
Khristian Boyd, DL, Northern Iowa			✓					✓	
Mark Gronowski, QB, South Dakota State	✓			✓		✓			✓
Mason McCormick, OL, South Dakota State	✓				✓	✓			
Matthew Cook, PK, Northern Iowa	✓				✓		✓		✓
Myles Harden, DB, South Dakota			✓	✓		✓			
PJ Jules, DB, Southern Illinois	✓			✓		✓			
Raylen Sharpe, WR, Missouri State			✓					✓	
Sam Schnee, WR, Northern Iowa					✓				

== Home attendance ==
Team	Stadium	Capacity	Game 1	Game 2	Game 3	Game 4	Game 5	Game 6	Game 7	Game 8	Game 9	Total	Average	% of Capacity
Illinois State	Hancock Stadium	13,391	6,740	**13,391**†	8,272	N/A	N/A	5,623				34,026	8,506	63.5%
Indiana State	Memorial Stadium	12,764	4,355	3,228	4,908†	4,798	3,151					20,440	4,088	32.0%
Missouri State	Robert W. Plaster Stadium	17,500	11,002	8,727	11,386†	7,700	6,898					45,713	9,142	52.2%
Murray State	Roy Stewart Stadium	16,800	6,953	13,213	15,868†	6,217	5,957					48,208	9,641	57.4%
North Dakota	Alerus Center	12,283	8,503	10,009	9,758	**13,091**†	11,125	9,238	6,522‡			68,246	9,749	79.4%
North Dakota State	Fargodome	18,700	15,044	15,016	18,342†	14,255	13,876	14,191	7,798‡			98,522	14,074	75.3%
Northern Iowa	UNI-Dome	16,324	7,967	10,346	10,677†	8,051	9,852					46,893	9,378	57.5%
South Dakota	DakotaDome	9,100	6,126	5,618	7,907	3,608	**9,458**†	6,834	6,288‡	**9,141**‡		54,980	6,872	75.5%
South Dakota State	Dana J. Dykhouse Stadium	19,340	16,258	19,332	19,231	**19,357**	**19,431**†	15,637	10,171‡	10,216‡	12,265‡	141,881	15,764	81.5%
Southern Illinois	Saluki Stadium	15,000	8,327	10,359	11,927†	7,106	4,812	4,576‡				47,107	7,851	52.3%
Western Illinois	Hanson Field	17,128	3,648†	3,548	2,809	2,636	1,935					14,576	2,915	17.0%
Youngstown State	Stambaugh Stadium	20,630	8,593	12,826†	9,767	10,022	9,880	9,303	3,866‡			64,257	9,179	44.5%

Bold - Exceed or met capacity
†Season High
‡FCS Playoff Game

== 2024 NFL draft ==
The following list includes all MVFC players who were drafted in the 2024 NFL draft.

Player	Position	School	Draft Round	Round Pick	Overall Pick	Team	Notes
Mason McCormick	OT	South Dakota State	4	19	119	Pittsburgh Steelers	
Isaiah Davis	RB	South Dakota State	5	38	173	New York Jets	from Kansas City via San Francisco
Khristian Boyd	DT	Northern Iowa	6	23	199	New Orleans Saints	from Philadelphia
Myles Harden	CB	South Dakota	7	7	227	Cleveland Browns	from Tennessee

=== Undrafted Free Agents ===
Player	Position	School	Team
Zack Annexstad	QB	Illinois State	Tampa Bay Buccaneers
Cam Grandy	TE	Illinois State	Cincinnati Bengals
Terique Owens	WR	Missouri State	San Francisco 49ers
TaMerik Williams	RB	North Dakota State	Seattle Seahawks
Jalen Sundell	OL	North Dakota State	Cleveland Browns
Jake Kubas	OL	North Dakota State	New York Giants
Jayden Price	CB	North Dakota State	Atlanta Falcons
Demarcus Governor	CB	Northern Iowa	Las Vegas Raiders
Sam Schnee	WR	Northern Iowa	Tennessee Titans
P. J. Jules	S	Southern Illinois	Cincinnati Bengals
Brock Mogensen	LB	South Dakota	Dallas Cowboys
Jadon Janke	WR	South Dakota State	Houston Texans
Jaxon Janke	WR	South Dakota State	Houston Texans
Zach Heins	TE	South Dakota State	Los Angeles Chargers
Garret Greenfield	OT	South Dakota State	Seattle Seahawks
DyShawn Gales	CB	South Dakota State	Cleveland Browns
Isaiah Stalbird	LB	South Dakota State	New Orleans Saints
Bryce Oliver	WR	Youngstown State	Tennessee Titans

== Head coaches ==
Through January 7, 2024
All stats include 2023 season

Team	Head coach	Years at school	Overall record	Record at school	MVFC record	MVFC titles	FCS Playoff appearances	FCS Playoff record	National Titles
Illinois State	Brock Spack	15	101–70 (.591)	101–70 (.591)	64–52 (.552)	2	5	7–5 (.583)	0
Indiana State	Curt Mallory	6 (Note: Indiana State did not play football in the 2020-21 academic year)	20–47 (.299)	20–47 (.299)	13–35 (.271)	0	0	0–0 (–)	0
Missouri State	Ryan Beard	1	4–7 (.364)	4–7 (.364)	3–5 (.375)	0	0	0–0 (–)	0
Murray State	Dean Hood (Note: Dean Hood coached Eastern Kentucky from 2008-2015. During his time there, the Colonels went 55-38 overall and 44-19 in the Ohio Valley Conference. This also included three FCS playoff berths, all three of which ended in the first round. Hood has coached Murray State since 2020, and while in the Ohio Valley Conference the team finished with a 13-16 overall record and a 9-9 league record.)	4	70–62 (.530)	15–24 (.385)	1–6 (.143)	0	3	0–3 (.000)	0
North Dakota	Bubba Schweigert (Note: Bubba Schweigert coached Minnesota Duluth of NCAA Division II from 2004-07. He also coached North Dakota while they were a part of the Big Sky Conference from 2014-17 and were independents in 2018 and 2019.)	10	83–71 (.539)	61–50 (.550)	17–12 (.586)	0	5	1–5 (.167)	0
North Dakota State	Matt Entz	5	60–11 (.845)	60–11 (.845)	32–7 (.821)	2	5	12–3 (.800)	2
Northern Iowa	Mark Farley	23	180–103 (.636)	180–103 (.636)	116–59 (.663)	7	13	16–13 (.552)	0
South Dakota	Bob Nielson (Note: Bob Nielson coached Western Illinois from 2013-15, which included a run in the playoffs that ended in the second round. Nielson also coached Minnesota-Duluth from 1999-2003 and 2008-12, that second stint included five consecutive NCAA Division II playoff appearances highlighted by 2 National Titles. In the first stint at MN-Duluth included his first Division II playoff appearance. Nielson also coached Wisconsin-Eau Claire from 1996-98 that included one NCAA Division III playoff run that ended in the semifinals. Before that, he coached Wartburg from 1991-95, which included two Division III playoff runs as well. His first head coaching job was at Ripon from 1989-90.)	8	228–125–1 (.645)	42–45 (.483)	29–31 (.483)	0	3	2–3 (.400)	2
South Dakota State	Jimmy Rogers	1	15–0 (1.000)	15–0 (1.000)	8–0 (1.000)	1	1	4–0 (1.000)	1
Southern Illinois	Nick Hill	8	44–48 (.478)	44–48 (.478)	26–36 (.419)	0	3	3–3 (.500)	0
Western Illinois	Myers Hendrickson (Note: Myers Hendrickson previously coached at Kansas Wesleyan of the NAIA from 2019-21, and helped the Coyotes to two NAIA playoff appearances.)	2	0–22 (.000)	0–22 (.000)	0–16 (.000)	0	0	0–0 (–)	0
Youngstown State	Doug Phillips	4	18–22 (.450)	18–22 (.450)	12–18 (.400)	0	1	1–1 (.500)	0
