= Khristian Boyd =

American football player (born 2000)

No. 97 – New Orleans Saints
- Position: Defensive tackle
- Roster status: Active

Personal information
- Born: February 23, 2000 (age 26); Kansas City, Missouri, U.S.
- Listed height: 6 ft 2 in (1.88 m)
- Listed weight: 320 lb (145 kg)

Career information
- High school: Blue Springs (Blue Springs, Missouri)
- College: Northern Iowa (2018–2023)
- NFL draft: 2024: 6th round, 199th overall pick

Career history
- New Orleans Saints (2024–present)

Awards and highlights
- First-team All-MVFC (2023); Second-team All-MVFC (2022)

Career NFL statistics as of Week 9, 2026
- Total tackles: 21
- Sacks: 2
- Forced fumbles: 1
- Pass deflections: 1
- Stats at Pro Football Reference

Khristian Boyd (born February 23, 2000) is an American professional football defensive tackle for the New Orleans Saints of the National Football League (NFL). He played college football for the Northern Iowa Panthers and was selected by the Saints in the sixth round of the 2024 NFL draft.

== Early life and college ==
Boyd attended Blue Springs High School in Blue Springs, Missouri. He committed to Northern Iowa University to play college football.

Boyd played at Northern Iowa from 2018 to 2022. During his career, he played in 49 games with 149 tackles and 10.5 sacks. After the 2023 season, he entered the 2024 NFL draft.

Boyd participated in the 2024 East–West Shrine Bowl.

== Professional career ==
Pre-draft measurables
Height	Weight	Arm length	Hand span	Wingspan	20-yard shuttle	Three-cone drill	Vertical jump	Broad jump	Bench press
6 ft 2 5/8 in (1.90 m)	325 lb (147 kg)	31 7/8 in (0.81 m)	9 5/8 in (0.24 m)	6 ft 5 1/8 in (1.96 m)	4.94 s	8.10 s	28.5 in (0.72 m)	8 ft 2 in (2.49 m)	38 reps
All values from Pro Day

Boyd was selected by the New Orleans Saints in the sixth round with the 199th overall pick in the 2024 NFL draft. The Saints selected Boyd with the fifth-round pick that was previously acquired after trading C. J. Gardner-Johnson to the Philadelphia Eagles.
