= Todd Drury =

American football coach (born c. 1986)

Current position
- Title: Safeties coach
- Team: Southeast Missouri State
- Conference: OVC

Biographical details
- Born: c. 1986 (age 39–40); Peoria, Illinois, U.S.
- Education: Evangel University (2009, 2011)

Playing career
- 2005–2008: Evangel
- Position: Tight end

Coaching career (HC unless noted)
- 2009–2011: Evangel (GA)
- 2012: Midland (ST/LB)
- 2013–2014: Evangel (DL)
- 2015–2016: Missouri S&T (DL)
- 2017–2018: Missouri S&T (DC)
- 2019–2021: Missouri S&T
- 2022–2023: Western Illinois (DC)
- 2024–present: Southeast Missouri State (S)

Head coaching record
- Overall: 15–10

Todd Drury (born c. 1986) is an American college football coach. He is the safeties coach for Southeast Missouri State University, a position he has held since 2024. He was the head football coach for Missouri University of Science and Technology from 2019 to 2021. He also coached for Evangel, Midland, and Western Illinois. He played college football for Evangel as a tight end.

== Head coaching record ==
Year	Team	Overall	Conference	Standing	Bowl/playoffs
Missouri S&T Miners (Great Lakes Valley Conference) (2019–2021)
2019	Missouri S&T	7–4	4–3	4th	
2020–21	Missouri S&T	2–1	2–1	2nd	
2021	Missouri S&T	6–5	4–3	T–3rd	
Missouri S&T:		15–10	10–7		
Total:		15–10			
