= Isaiah Davis =

American football player (born 2002)

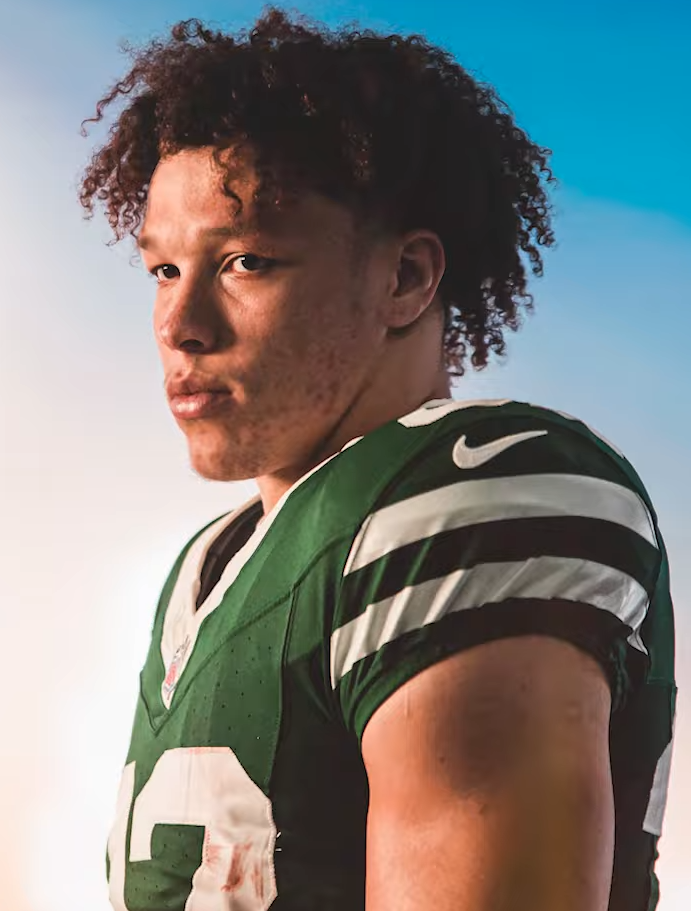
- Davis with the New York Jets in 2025

No. 32 – New York Jets
- Position: Running back
- Roster status: Active

Personal information
- Born: February 21, 2002 (age 24); Joplin, Missouri, U.S.
- Listed height: 6 ft 1 in (1.85 m)
- Listed weight: 220 lb (100 kg)

Career information
- High school: Joplin
- College: South Dakota State (2020–2023)
- NFL draft: 2024: 5th round, 173rd overall pick

Career history
- New York Jets (2024–present)

Awards and highlights
- 2× FCS national champion (2022, 2023); First-team FCS All-American (2023); MVFC Co-Offensive Player of the Year (2023); 2× First-team All-MVFC (2022, 2023)

Career NFL statistics as of 2025
- Rushing yards: 410
- Rushing average: 5.6
- Rushing touchdowns: 2
- Receptions: 30
- Receiving yards: 261
- Receiving touchdowns: 1
- Stats at Pro Football Reference

Isaiah Davis (born February 21, 2002) is an American professional football running back for the New York Jets of the National Football League (NFL). He played college football for the South Dakota State Jackrabbits and was selected by the Jets in the fifth round of the 2024 NFL draft.

== Early life ==
Davis grew up in Joplin, Missouri. His family's home was destroyed in the 2011 Joplin tornado. He and his brother survived by laying under a mattress in a hallway of the house. He attended Joplin High School. He rushed for 1,676 yards and 28 touchdowns during his junior season. As a senior, Davis was named the Missouri Gatorade Player of the Year after he rushed for 2,283 yards and 45 touchdowns on 253 carries, caught 19 passes for 220 yards and two touchdowns, and also made 52 tackles as a linebacker on defense. He lost to De Smet Jesuit High School in the 2019 Class 6A Missouri state championship. Davis committed to play college football at South Dakota State.

== College career ==
Davis's freshman season at South Dakota State (SDSU) was postponed from the fall to the spring of 2021 due to COVID-19. He rushed for 818 yards and 10 touchdowns during the season. As a sophomore, Davis missed some time due to injuries and gained 701 yards and scored seven touchdowns on 95 carries. He was named first-team All-Missouri Valley Football Conference (MVFC) rushed for 1,451 yards and 15 touchdowns as the Jackrabbits won the 2023 NCAA Division I Football Championship Game.

== Professional career ==
Pre-draft measurables
Height	Weight	Arm length	Hand span	Wingspan	40-yard dash	10-yard split	20-yard split	20-yard shuttle	Vertical jump	Broad jump	Bench press
6 ft 0 1/4 in (1.84 m)	218 lb (99 kg)	31 1/8 in (0.79 m)	10 1/4 in (0.26 m)	6 ft 2 7/8 in (1.90 m)	4.57 s	1.58 s	2.64 s	4.30 s	34.5 in (0.88 m)	9 ft 11 in (3.02 m)	23 reps
All values from NFL Combine/Pro Day

Davis was selected with the 173rd overall pick in the fifth round of the 2024 NFL draft by the New York Jets. He played in all 17 of New York's games during his rookie campaign, compiling 30 attempts for 174 yards and one touchdown, as well as nine receptions for 75 yards and one touchdown.

Davis made 16 appearances for the Jets during the 2025 campaign, recording 43 attempts for 236 yards and one touchdown; he also tallied 21 receptions for 186 yards. On January 3, 2026, Davis was placed on season-ending injured reserve due to a concussion.

== NFL career statistics ==
Year	Team	Games		Rushing					Receiving					Fumbles	
Year	Team	GP	GS	Att	Yds	Y/A	Lng	TD	Rec	Yds	Y/R	Lng	TD	Fum	Lost
2024	NYJ	17	0	30	174	5.8	20	1	9	75	8.3	24	1	0	0
2025	NYJ	16	0	43	236	5.5	50	1	21	186	8.9	26	0	0	0
Career		33	0	73	410	5.6	50	2	30	261	8.7	26	1	0	0
