= List of Southwest Minnesota State Mustangs head football coaches =

The Southwest Minnesota State Mustangs football program is a college football team that represents Southwest Minnesota State University in the Northern Sun Intercollegiate Conference, a part of the NCAA Division II. The team has had 10 head coaches since its first recorded football game in 1968. The current coach is Scott Underwood who first took the position for the 2022 season.

== Key ==
Key to symbols in coaches list
General		Overall		Conference		Postseason (Note: Although the first Rose Bowl Game was played in 1902, it has been continuously played since the 1916 game, and is recognized as the oldest bowl game by the NCAA. "—" indicates any season prior to 1916 when postseason games were not played.)	
No.	Order of coaches (Note: A running total of the number of head coaches, with coaches who served separate tenures being counted only once. Interim head coaches are represented with "Int" and are not counted in the running total. "—" indicates the team played but either without a coach or no coach is on record. "X" indicates an interim year without play.)	GC	Games coached	CW	Conference wins	PW	Postseason wins
DC	Division championships	OW	Overall wins	CL	Conference losses	PL	Postseason losses
CC	Conference championships	OL	Overall losses	CT	Conference ties	PT	Postseason ties
NC	National championships	OT	Overall ties (Note: Overtime rules in college football were introduced in 1996, making ties impossible in the period since.)	C%	Conference winning percentage		
†	Elected to the College Football Hall of Fame	O%	Overall winning percentage (Note: When computing the win–loss percentage, a tie counts as half a win and half a loss.)				

== Coaches ==
No.	Name	Term	GC	OW	OL	OT	O%	CW	CL	CT	C%	PW	PL	CCs	Awards
1	John Rutter	1968–1970	26	7	19	0	.269	—	—	—	—	—	—	—	—
2	Ralph Young	1971–1972	20	3	17	0	.150	—	—	—	—	—	—	—	—
3	Mike Sterner	1973–1976	36	9	27	0	.250	—	—	—	—	—	—	—	—
4	Lew Shaver	1977–1978	19	3	16	0	.158	—	—	—	—	—	—	—	—
5	Gary M. Buer	1979–1992	145	70	70	5	.500	—	—	—	—	—	—	—	—
6	Brent Jeffers	1993–1996	41	12	29	0	.293	—	—	—	—	—	—	—	—
7	Ron Flowers	1997–1999	32	14	18	0	.438	—	—	—	—	—	—	—	—
8	Curt Strasheim	2000–2003	44	14	30	0	.318	—	—	—	—	—	—	—	—
9	Eric Eidsness	2004–2009	66	26	40	0	.394	—	—	—	—	—	—	—	—
10	Cory Sauter	2010–2021	122	45	77	0	.369	—	—	—	—	—	—	—	—
11	Scott Underwood	2022–present	44	6	38	0	.136	—	—	—	—	—	—	—	—
