= Scott Underwood =

American football coach (born c. 1966)

Biographical details
- Born: c. 1966 (age 59–60)
- Education: Augustana College (IL) (1988); University of South Dakota

Playing career
- 1984–1987: Augustana (IL)
- Position: Defensive back

Coaching career (HC unless noted)
- 1988–1992: Augustana (IL) (ST/S)
- 1993–1996: Sioux Falls (DC)
- 1997–2000: North Dakota (LB)
- 2001–2007: St. Cloud State (DC)
- 2008–2019: St. Cloud State
- 2022–2026: Southwest Minnesota State

Head coaching record
- Overall: 94–92
- Tournaments: 3–3 (NCAA D-II playoffs)

Accomplishments and honors

Championships
- 1 NSIC (2011); 2 NSIC North Division (2011, 2013)

Scott Underwood (born c. 1966) is an American former college football coach. He served as the head football coach at Southwest Minnesota State University from 2022 until his retirement in 2026. He previously was the head football coach for St. Cloud State University from 2008 until the football program was dropped in 2019. He previously coached for Augustana (IL), Sioux Falls, and North Dakota. He played football for Augustana as a defensive back.

On September 20, 2026, Underwood announced his retirement, effective immediately. Defensive coordinator Levi Bullerman was named interim head coach for the remainder of the season.

== Head coaching record ==
Year	Team	Overall	Conference	Standing	Bowl/playoffs	AFCA^{#}
St. Cloud State Huskies (Northern Sun Intercollegiate Conference) (2008–2019)
2008	St. Cloud State	7–4	7–3 / 5–1	T–4th / 2nd (North)		
2009	St. Cloud State	7–4	7–3 / 5–1	T–3rd / 2nd (North)		
2010	St. Cloud State	10–3	9–1 / 5–1	T–2nd / 2nd (North)	L NCAA Division II Second Round	12
2011	St. Cloud State	9–3	8–2 / 5–1	T–1st / T–1st (North)	L NCAA Division II First Round	17
2012	St. Cloud State	7–4	7–4 / 5–2	T–5th / T–3rd (North)		
2013	St. Cloud State	12–2	10–1 / 6–1	T–2nd / 2nd (North)	L NCAA Division II Quarterfinal	5
2014	St. Cloud State	6–5	6–5 / 5–2	4th / 3rd (North)		
2015	St. Cloud State	6–5	6–5 / 4–3	T–7th / 4th (North)		
2016	St. Cloud State	5–6	5–6 / 4–3	T–9th / T–4th (North)		
2017	St. Cloud State	6–5	6–5 / 3–4	6th / T–4th (North)		
2018	St. Cloud State	7–4	7–4 / 4–3	T–5th / 4th (North)		
2019	St. Cloud State	4–7	4–7 / 3–4	T–10th / 5th (North)		
St. Cloud State:		87–51	82–46			
Southwest Minnesota State Mustangs (Northern Sun Intercollegiate Conference) (2022–2026)
2022	Southwest Minnesota State	4–7	4–7 / 1–5	9th / 6th (South)		
2023	Southwest Minnesota State	1–10	1–9	13th		
2024	Southwest Minnesota State	0–11	0–10	13th		
2025	Southwest Minnesota State	1–10	1–9 / 0–6	T–13th / 7th (South)		
2026	Southwest Minnesota State	1–3	0–3	(Note: Underwood retired four games into the season.)		
Southwest Minnesota State:		7–41	6–38			
Total:		94–92				
National championship Conference title Conference division title or championship game berth
