= 2023 Valparaiso Beacons football team =

American college football season

2023 Valparaiso Beacons football
- Conference: Pioneer Football League
- Record: 3–8 (2–6 PFL)
- Head coach: Landon Fox (5th season)
- Offensive coordinator: Matthew Symmes (1st season)
- Defensive coordinator: Dave Marquis (1st season)
- Home stadium: Brown Field

2023 Pioneer Football League standings
	Conf.			Overall
Team	W		L	W		L
Drake $^	8	–	0	8	–	4
St. Thomas (MN) *	7	–	1	8	–	3
Davidson	6	–	2	7	–	4
Butler	5	–	3	7	–	4
Marist	4	–	4	4	–	7
San Diego	4	–	4	4	–	7
Morehead State	3	–	5	4	–	7
Presbyterian	2	–	6	4	–	7
Valparaiso	2	–	6	3	–	8
Dayton	2	–	6	4	–	7
Stetson	1	–	7	3	–	8
$ – Conference champion; ^ – FCS playoff participant; * – St. Thomas (MN) ineligible for FCS postseason play due to transition from NCAA Division III; Rankings from STATS Poll

The 2023 Valparaiso Beacons football team represented Valparaiso University as a member of the Pioneer Football League (PFL) during the 2023 NCAA Division I FCS football season. The Beacons were led by fifth-year head coach Landon Fox and played home games at Brown Field in Valparaiso, Indiana.

== Schedule ==
Date	Time	Opponent	Site	TV	Result	Attendance
August 31	6:30 p.m.	at Youngstown State*	Stambaugh Stadium; Youngstown, OH	ESPN+	L 10–52	8,593
September 9	5:00 p.m.	at Indiana Wesleyan*	Wildcat Stadium; Marion, IN	ESPN+	L 22–24	
September 23	12:00 p.m.	Marist^{†}	Brown Field; Valparaiso, IN	ESPN+	L 30–36 ^{OT}	3,331
September 30	1:00 p.m.	Southwest Minnesota State*	Brown Field; Valparaiso, IN	ESPN+	W 16–15	1,573
October 7	1:00 p.m.	at Drake	Drake Stadium; Des Moines, IA	ESPN+	L 14–20	3,075
October 14	1:00 p.m.	Morehead State	Brown Field; Valparaiso, IN	ESPN+	L 21–24	1,101
October 21	12:00 p.m.	at Davidson	Richardson Stadium; Davidson, NC	ESPN+	L 21–42	4,991
October 28	12:00 p.m.	at Butler	Bud and Jackie Sellick Bowl; Indianapolis, IN	ESPN+	L 7–17	4,224
November 4	1:00 p.m.	Dayton	Brown Field; Valparaiso, IN	ESPN+	W 21–7	1,829
November 11	12:00 p.m.	Stetson	Brown Field; Valparaiso, IN	ESPN+	W 23–20 ^{OT}	1,056
November 18	1:00 p.m.	at St. Thomas (MN)	O'Shaughnessy Stadium; Saint Paul, MN	ESPN+	L 10–16	3,310
*Non-conference game; ^{†}Homecoming; All times are in Central time
