= Brent Jeffers =

American football coach

Coaching career (HC unless noted)
- 1993–1996: Southwest State

Head coaching record
- Overall: 12–29

Accomplishments and honors

Awards
- NSIC Coach of the Year (1994)

Brent Jeffers is an American football coach. He served as the head football coach at Southwest State University—now known as Southwest Minnesota State University—in Marshall, Minnesota, for four seasons, from 1993 to 1996, compiling a record of 12–29.

== Head coaching record ==
Year	Team	Overall	Conference	Standing	Bowl/playoffs
Southwest State Mustangs (Northern Sun Intercollegiate Conference) (1993–1996)
1993	Southwest State	4–6	3–3	5th	
1994	Southwest State	4–6	3–3	T–4th	
1995	Southwest State	2–8	2–4	T–5th	
1996	Southwest State	2–9	2–4	5th	
Southwest State:		12–29	10–14		
Total:		12–29			
