= Ralph Young (American football, born 1946) =

American football and baseball coach (born 1946)

Biographical details
- Born: May 4, 1946 (age 80)

Playing career

Football
- c. 1967: Parsons
- Position: Linebacker

Coaching career (HC unless noted)

Football
- 1970: South Dakota (assistant)
- 1971–1972: Southwest State
- 1979–1983: Illinois Benedictine
- 1984: Southeast Missouri State (OL)
- 1989–1992: Southern Illinois (assistant)
- 1993: William Penn
- 1996–1998: Westminster (MO)
- 1999–2001: Oklahoma Panhandle State

Baseball
- 1971: South Dakota

Head coaching record
- Overall: 44–96 (college football); 5–23 (college baseball)

Ralph Young (born May 4, 1946) is an American former college football and college baseball coach. He served as the head football coach at Southwest Minnesota State College—now known as Southwest Minnesota State University—from 1971 to 1972, at Illinois Benedictine College—now known as Benedictine University—from 1979 to 1983, at William Penn College in 1993, at Westminster College in Fulton, Missouri from 1996 to 1998, and at Oklahoma Panhandle State University from 1999 to 2001, compiling a career college football heading coaching record of 44–96. Young was also the head baseball coach at the University of South Dakota for one season, in 1971, tallying a mark of 5–23.

== Early life ==
Young was born in Clearwater, Florida. He went to Parsons College in Fairfield, Iowa, and played as a linebacker for the Parsons Wildcats under coach Marcelino Huerta.

== Head coaching record ==
=== College football ===
Year	Team	Overall	Conference	Standing	Bowl/playoffs
Southwest State Mustangs (Northern Intercollegiate Conference) (1971–1972)
1971	Southwest State	0–10	0–6	7th	
1972	Southwest State	3–7	2–4	5th	
Southwest State:		3–17	2–10		
Illinois Benedictine Eagles (Northern Illinois-Iowa Conference) (1979–1983)
1979	Illinois Benedictine	3–7			
1980	Illinois Benedictine	3–7			
1981	Illinois Benedictine	6–4			
1982	Illinois Benedictine	6–4			
1983	Illinois Benedictine	0–10			
Illinois Benedictine:		18–32			
William Penn Statesmen (Iowa Intercollegiate Athletic Conference) (1993)
1993	William Penn	1–9	0–8	9th	
William Penn:		1–9	0–8		
Westminster Blue Jays (St. Louis Intercollegiate Athletic Conference) (1996–1998)
1996	Westminster	5–4			
1997	Westminster	6–4			
1998	Westminster	9–1			
Westminster:		20–9			
Oklahoma Panhandle State Aggies () (1999–2001)
1999	Oklahoma Panhandle State	1–9			
2000	Oklahoma Panhandle State	1–10			
2001	Oklahoma Panhandle State	0–10			
Oklahoma Panhandle State:		2–29			
Total:		44–96			
