= Lew Shaver =

American football and basketball coach

Coaching career (HC unless noted)
- 1977–1978: Southwest State

Head coaching record
- Overall: 3–16

Lew Shaver is an American former football and basketball coach. He served as the head football coach at Southwest State University—now known as Southwest Minnesota State University—from 1977 to 1978, compiling a record of 3–16.

== Head coaching record ==
Year	Team	Overall	Conference	Standing	Bowl/playoffs
Southwest State Mustangs (Northern Intercollegiate Conference) (1977–1978)
1977	Southwest State	1–8	1–6	T–6th	
1978	Southwest State	2–8	1–7	8th	
Southwest State:		3–16	2–13		
Total:		3–16			
