= John Rutter (American football) =

American football coach

Coaching career (HC unless noted)
- 1968–1970: Southwest Minnesota State

Head coaching record
- Overall: 7–19

John Rutter is an American former football coach. He was the head football coach at Southwest Minnesota State University in Marshall, Minnesota, serving for three seasons, from 1968 to 1970, and compiling a record of 7–19.
