= Curt Strasheim =

American football player and coach

Biographical details
- Born: Granite Falls, Minnesota, U.S.

Playing career
- 1978–1981: Southwest State
- Position: Quarterback

Coaching career (HC unless noted)
- 1982: Southwest State (QB)
- 1988–1989: South Dakota State (QB)
- 1990–1992: Millersville (OB/RC)
- 1993–1995: Wisconsin–Stout (OC/RC)
- 1996–1999: Western Illinois (RB)
- 2000–2003: Southwest State / Southwest Minnesota State

Head coaching record
- Overall: 14–30

Curt Strasheim is an American former football coach. He was the head football coach at Southwest Minnesota State University in Marshall, Minnesota, serving for four seasons, from 2000 to 2003, and compiling a record of 14–30.

== Head coaching record ==
Year	Team	Overall	Conference	Standing	Bowl/playoffs
Southwest State / Southwest Minnesota State Mustangs (Northern Sun Intercollegiate Conference) (2000–2003)
2000	Southwest State	4–7	3–5	7th	
2001	Southwest State	3–8	3–6	T–8th	
2002	Southwest State	4–7	3–6	T–7th	
2003	Southwest Minnesota State	3–8	1–7	T–8th	
Southwest State / Southwest Minnesota State:		14–30	10–24		
Total:		14–30			
