= Sterner =

Sterner is a surname of Germanic origin. The name may refer to:

- E. Donald Sterner (1894–1983), American lumberman and politician from New Jersey
- Frederick Sterner (1862–1939), British-born American architect
- Jerry Sterner (1938–2001), American playwright
- Jonas Sterner (born 2002), German footballer
- Justin Sterner (born 1996), American baseball player
- Mike Sterner, American college football coach in the 1970s
- Olof Sterner (1914–1968), Swedish chess master
- Phil Sterner (born 1960), American politician from Minnesota; state legislator
- Robin Sterner (born 1990), Swedish professional ice hockey player
- Ulf Sterner (born 1941), Swedish professional ice hockey player

== See also ==
- 16209 Sterner, asteroid
