= Bergen County Technical High School, Teterboro Campus =

High school in Bergen County, New Jersey, US

Bergen County Technical High School Teterboro Campus

Location
- 504 Route 46; Teterboro, Bergen County, New Jersey 07608; United States; 40.859675°N 74.054586°W

Information
- Type: Technical Public high school
- Established: 2000
- School district: Bergen County Technical Schools
- NCES School ID: 340147000262
- Principal: David J. Tankard
- Faculty: 69.0 FTEs
- Grades: 9–12
- Enrollment: 665 (as of 2024–25)
- Student to teacher ratio: 9.6:1
- Colors: Black; White and Vegas Gold
- Athletics conference: Big North Conference
- Team name: Knights
- Newspaper: Knight's News
- Website: www.bergen.org/bcthstc

Bergen County Technical High School, also known as Bergen Tech (BT), is a four-year, tuition-free public magnet high school located in Teterboro, New Jersey serving students in ninth through twelfth grades in Bergen County, in the U.S. state of New Jersey. Bergen Tech is part of the Bergen County Technical Schools, a countywide district that also includes Bergen County Academies in Hackensack, Applied Technology in Paramus, and Bergen Tech in Paramus. The school is nationally recognized, as students have the opportunity to be engaged in a technical major while fulfilling college preparatory classes and having the opportunity to take a wide variety of electives.

As of the 2024–25 school year, the school had an enrollment of 665 students and 69.0 classroom teachers (on an FTE basis), for a student–teacher ratio of 9.6:1. There were 84 students (12.6% of enrollment) eligible for free lunch and 12 (1.8% of students) eligible for reduced-cost lunch.

The school is currently organized into nine majors: Aerospace Engineering, Automotive Engineering and Design, Computer Science, Commercial Art & Graphic Design, Culinology, Digital & Media Arts, Fashion Design & Merchandising, Financial Technology, and Law & Justice.

Bergen Tech is a member of the National Consortium for Specialized Secondary Schools of Mathematics, Science and Technology and the Coalition of Essential Schools. It is accredited by the Middle States Association of Colleges and Schools and the New Jersey Department of Education.

== History ==
Bergen Tech was originally a shared-time vocational school which was completely revamped in 2000 to be a full-time, academic high school with students taking classes in their particular "majors." A number of advanced classes have been added to Bergen Tech's curriculum since the school's inception, including AP Physics C and AP Government to sophomores in the Law and Justice major. The high school also gained the interest from schools abroad with the intention of creating a foreign exchange program in 2013, receiving visits from high schools in France and South Korea (due to a partnership between the Hyundai Motor Company and the Bergen Tech Automotive major).

== Awards, recognition and rankings ==
=== 2011 ===
Schooldigger.com ranked the school tied for 18th out of 381 public high schools statewide in its 2011 rankings (a decrease of 6 positions from the 2010 ranking) which were based on the combined percentage of students classified as proficient or above proficient on the mathematics (98.3%) and language arts literacy (100.0%) components of the High School Proficiency Assessment (HSPA).

=== 2012 ===
The school was recognized in 2012 by the National Blue Ribbon Schools Program of the United States Department of Education, one of 15 public and private schools in the state to be honored that year. It was ranked 104th in the nation and sixth in New Jersey on the list of "America's Best High Schools 2012" prepared by The Daily Beast / Newsweek, with rankings based primarily on graduation rate, matriculation rate for college and number of Advanced Placement / International Baccalaureate courses taken per student, with lesser factors based on average scores on the SAT / ACT, average AP/IB scores and the number of AP/IB courses available to students.

=== 2013 ===
In its 2013 report on "America's Best High Schools", The Daily Beast ranked the school 74th in the nation among participating public high schools and 7th among schools in New Jersey. U.S. News & World Report named BT as a Gold Medal High School the same year.

=== 2014 ===
In 2014, Bergen Tech was named the 129th best high school in the nation, and the 5th best high school in the state of New Jersey by the U.S. News & World Report. New Jersey Monthly, which publishes high school rankings within the state based on student/teacher ratio and student results on the SAT, HSPA, AP/IB exams, and graduation rates, placed BT tied for 8th within its list of the "Top Vocational High Schools in New Jersey". In addition, the school was named an Apple Distinguished School for 2013-2015.

=== 2015 ===
Business Insider, using data from the 2015 Niche rankings, ranked the school as 12th in the nation and second in New Jersey on its 2014 list of the "25 best public high school in the United States". In addition, U.S. News & World Report ranked the school 3rd best in the state and 31st in the nation.

=== 2016 ===
In its listing of "America's Best High Schools 2016", the school was ranked 41st out of 500 best high schools in the country; it was ranked 13th among all high schools in New Jersey.

== Academics ==
In addition to studying specific "majors" of study, as of 2024, the school currently offers 22 different Advanced Placement (AP) courses, including every science AP course offered by the College Board in addition to college-level courses which offer credit through articulation with various universities. Approximately 81.4% of students participate in Advanced Placement classes, which is above the New Jersey state average participation rate of 19%. In 2023, 522 students took a total of 988 Advanced Placement exams. On average, each student received a score of 3.8. Students fulfill requirements for their major in addition to the New Jersey required curriculum and are able to use remaining elective slots to pursue other interests.

=== Majors ===
Bergen County Technical High School offers nine majors for its students, each offering a unique curriculum. A student's major, however, does not limit the electives the student may take.

Automotive Engineering & Design

The Automotive major focuses on using modern technology to educate its students in automotive engineering. Classes include Systems Analysis I and Advanced Systems Analysis. A recently created automotive lab and a newly upgraded automotive shop offer hands-on experiences to students of this major.

Commercial Art & Graphic Design

The Commercial Art & Graphic Design major is a college-level course with an intense focus on the principles of art and design. Students in this major often participate in design contests and art festivals, such as the Bergen County Teen Arts Festival. By the end of a student's senior year, students have a portfolio showing their creativity and technical proficiency. Classes include Foundations of Graphic Design and Fundamentals of 2D Design & Drawing.

Culinology® (Food Science)

The Culinology major is the first high school program of its kind in the United States. The major's three classrooms are equipped with the country's one and only Culinology facility, a state of the art kitchen, and a food science laboratory. Students focus on both food and culinary sciences during their high school career. The program offers partnerships with corporations such as Pepsi and universities including Rutgers. Current courses include Intro to Culinology, Nutrition Food and Health, and Microbiology.

Digital Media

The Digital Media major is a 4-year program where students learn to use relevant computer programs, including Adobe Photoshop, Adobe Premiere, Adobe After Effects, and Logic Pro. Also known as "DM", the program focuses on teaching students how to translate ideas to film and programming and to create all kinds of pieces of art. Classes include Graphics and Animation, Broadcast Media and Journalism, and Advanced Video and Audio Production.

Fashion, Design & Merchandising

The Fashion, Design & Merchandising major allows students to experiment with design concepts and patterns with a fully equipped design studio. The program explores color and textiles, fashion illustrations, and pattern making and sewing skills. Students can have their work displayed at the Belskie Museum in Closter and at an annual fashion extravaganza at the end of the year. Areas of study include Apparel Design and Fashion Art & Design.

Financial Technology (FINTECH)

In 2025, the Financial Technology major emerged as an update to the Strategic Asset Management (Business) major, focusing on a curriculum that spans economics, data analytics, financial institutions, and programming. The major took part in the National Financial Capability Challenge, with 11 out of 13 students of the Class of 2015 scoring in the 90th percentile, including one student who obtained a perfect score (only 583 students across the United States earned a perfect score). Students are required to take AP Macroeconomics in their sophomore year, and AP Microeconomics in their junior year. Courses include Roadmap to Computing, college-level financial accounting, Financial Markets and Institutions, and Business Data Analytics.

Computer Science (IT)

The Computer Science program at Bergen Tech seeks to educate students surrounding computing needs, supporting research in communications information, network theory, data structures, and programming. Courses include Intro to Object-Oriented Design, Intermediate & Advanced Programming, AP Computer Science Principles, and Cloud Computing.

Law & Justice

The Law and Justice major has hosted numerous mock trials, competitive debates, and social issues presentations. Classes for this major include Intro to Law & Justice, AP United States Government and Politics, Criminology, Constitutional Law, Introduction to Public Policy Analysis (Syracuse University Course), Forensic Science (Syracuse University Course), and Senior Seminar. The major culminates in a Washington DC capstone trip, where students choose a topic of choice to research and go onto conduct interviews with staff members, public servants, and interest groups on the trip to complete their paper. Previous courses offered include Torts and Corrections & Police Studies. The major also currently holds an articulation agreement with Fairleigh Dickinson University for those interested in pursuing a B.A. in Criminal Justice.

Aerospace Engineering

This major offers courses geared towards engineering, with a more specific focus on aerospace engineering. Classes include Intro to Aerospace Engineering, Digital Electronics, and Principles of Engineering. Aerospace Engineering started in September 2014, replacing the Pre-Engineering major. Upon competing the program, students will have a working knowledge of Computer Assisted Design (CAD), and both college-level and AP coursework.

=== Science (A Physics First Approach) ===
Bergen Tech has also been recognized for their rigorous physics department, where nearly 64% of students move on to take AP Physics 2 in their sophomore year. Dr. Robert Goodman, a former Bergen Tech physics teacher, who was named New Jersey Teacher of the Year for 2005-2006., is an advocate of the Physics First methodology and did his doctoral dissertation at Rutgers University based on the success of teaching Physics First to freshman based on the model he implemented at Bergen Tech. The science curriculum framework centers around freshmen taking Physics Honors, with the option of taking AP Physics 2, AP Physics C, and Waves and Modern Physics from NJIT in subsequent years. Instead of the traditional biology-chemistry-physics sequence, Physics First relies upon a physics-chemistry-biology sequence. The school's specialized curriculum adds a lab period once a week to every student's schedule to all science classes, which is equivalent to two regular periods. In these labs, students perform unique experiments to understand real-life methods applications of the sciences they are studying. Physics experiments range from creating a personal generator to measuring the frequency of a sonic boom.

Students interested in taking AP Chemistry can do so their junior and senior years, and those interested in AP Biology may do so in their senior year. In addition to AP Chemistry and Biology, as well as AP Environmental Science, students have the option to take college level classes in Organic Chemistry (articulation with Fairleigh Dickinson University), Forensic Science (a Syracuse University Project Advance Course), and/or Anatomy & Physiology.

=== Mathematics ===
Bergen Tech - Teterboro offers a wide range of mathematics courses. These include: Algebra I, Geometry, Math Analysis I & II (a highly rigorous two-year Precalculus with Limits course with a heavy emphasis on Algebra II and Trigonometry), AP Calculus AB, AP Calculus BC, Multivariable Calculus, and AP Statistics. Based on the number of students who choose to take the class, some years there will be an Algebra II class, or a Calculus Honors course. Incoming students can take a summer Pre-Algebra or Algebra I course if they feel necessary, or to be placed in another math class.

=== Humanities ===
Aside from World Cultures, United States Honors 1 and 2, and AP US History classes, college level classes in Global Challenge and Sociology are also available as electives.

In the 2016-2017 academic school year, AP Human Geography was introduced to the freshmen class for certain students. Course material in Human Geography is based on the concept of globalization.

=== AP Seminar and AP Research ===
Starting from the 2015-2016 academic year, Bergen Tech offers AP Seminar and AP Research, one of the newest curriculums designed by the CollegeBoard.

=== Project Wednesdays and Senior Experience ===
Every Wednesday during the school year, periods are shortened to accommodate an additional hour before regular classes proceed. This period is known as Project Wednesday. Types of projects that students can apply to are: knitting, Physics Olympiad, Garage Band, Radio Lab, Equations, The Sims, Robotics, Earth preservation, Fitness, Teacher, and many more. This allows students to take classes that help explore their interests outside of traditional course offerings. Freshmen are required to take a project named "Setting Up For Success (SUFS)" to help adjust to Bergen Tech's intense coursework. Seniors take every Wednesday to partake in what is known as "Senior Experience," where every senior participates in an off-campus internship for the entire school day that gives credits required for graduation.

== Extracurricular activities ==
Among a wide variety of after school clubs and extracurricular activities available, students at Bergen Tech - Teterboro participate in the SkillsUSA competition yearly. The school gained a record-breaking achievement of eight gold medals, nine silver medals and three bronze medals for their 2012 chapter.

== Athletics ==
The school offers various sports, where students play together with the other campuses of the Bergen County Technical Schools district under one consolidated set of teams. The boys' teams, called the Bergen Tech Knights, and the girls' teams, the Bergen Tech Lady Knights, compete in the Big North Conference, which is comprised of public and private high schools in Bergen and Passaic counties, and was established following a reorganization of the Northern New Jersey sports leagues by the New Jersey State Interscholastic Athletic Association. In the 2009–2010 school year, the school competed in the North Jersey Tri-County Conference, which was established on an interim basis to facilitate the realignment. Before the realignment, Bergen Tech had been placed in the Northern New Jersey Interscholastic League (NNJIL) at the start of the Fall 2006 athletic season. With 1,669 students in grades 10-12, the school was classified by the NJSIAA for the 2019–20 school year as Group IV for most athletic competition purposes, which included schools with an enrollment of 1,060 to 5,049 students in that grade range. The school was classified by the NJSIAA as Group V North for football for 2024–2026, which included schools with 1,317 to 5,409 students. Sports offered include: cross country, football, soccer, tennis, volleyball, cheerleading, basketball, bowling, indoor track, fencing, baseball, golf, lacrosse, softball, and track & field. Students who wish to play a high school sport that is not offered can make accommodations with the school district in their place of residence, as appropriate.

== Administration ==
David J. Tankard is the school's principal. His administration team includes the assistant principal.
