= Ron Flowers (American football) =

American football coach

Coaching career (HC unless noted)
- 1997–1999: Southwest State

Head coaching record
- Overall: 14–18

Ron Flowers is an American former football coach. He served as the head football coach at Southwest State University—now known as Southwest Minnesota State University—in Marshall, Minnesota, for three seasons, from 1997 to 1999, compiling a record of 14–18.

== Head coaching record ==
Year	Team	Overall	Conference	Standing	Bowl/playoffs
Southwest State Mustangs (Northern Sun Intercollegiate Conference) (1997–1998)
1997	Southwest State	5–6	3–3	T–3rd	
1998	Southwest State	3–7	2–4	5th	
1999	Southwest State	6–5	5–3	T–4th	
Southwest State:		14–18	10–10		
Total:		14–18			
