= Matt Fletcher (basketball) =

American college basketball coach

Current position
- Title: Head coach
- Team: Concordia–St. Paul
- Conference: NSIC
- Record: 63–95

Biographical details
- Education: SMSU

Coaching career (HC unless noted)
- 2008–2009: Concordia–Moorhead (assistant)
- 2009–2011: South St. Paul HS
- 2011–2012: Kentucky Wesleyan (assistant)
- 2012–2013: Anoka HS
- 2013–2016: Upper Iowa (assistant)
- 2016–2020: Bethany Lutheran
- 2020–present: Concordia–St. Paul

Head coaching record
- Overall: 140–127
- Tournaments: 1–1 (NCAA DII); 1–2 (NCAA DIII)

Accomplishments and honors

Championships
- NSIC regular season (2025); UMAC regular season (2018); 2 UMAC Tournament (2018, 2020)

Awards
- NSIC Coach of the Year (2025); North Branch Athletics Hall of Fame; UMAC Coach of the Year (2018); (Golf) UMAC Coach of the Year (2019)

Matt Fletcher is an American college basketball coach, currently the head coach for the Concordia–St. Paul Golden Bears. He is a graduate and a member of the athletics hall of fame at North Branch Area High School. He played basketball at Southwest Minnesota State University where he graduated from with a Bachelor's degree in Sports Management.

Fletcher made many small coaching stops during his early career such as Concordia–Moorhead, South St. Paul High School, Kentucky Wesleyan (where he was also the women's golf coach), and Anoka High School. In 2013 he was hired as an assistant coach for the Upper Iowa Peacocks. He remained there for three seasons.

In 2016, he was hired to his first collegiate head coaching job at Bethany Lutheran College. During his four seasons there, the Vikings won one UMAC regular season championship (2018), two UMAC Tournament championships (2018 and 2020), and made it to the NCAA Division III men's basketball tournament twice (2018 and 2020). In 2018 he was named as the UMAC Coach of the Year. While there, he also served as the head coach of the women's golf team and earned the UMAC Coach of the Year award for golf in 2019.

In April 2020, Fletcher was named as the head of the Concordia–St. Paul Golden Bears of the Northern Sun Intercollegiate Conference. During the 2024–25 season, he would lead Concordia–St. Paul to their first ever NSIC regular season championship and would subsequently be named as the NSIC Coach of the Year, the first coach from Concordia–St. Paul to ever do so.

He has a wife named Aly and two sons.

== Head coaching record ==
Record table
Season	Team	Overall	Conference	Standing	Postseason
Bethany Lutheran (UMAC) (2016–2020)
2016–17	Bethany Lutheran	17–9	12–4	2nd	
2017–18	Bethany Lutheran	20–9	13–3	1st	NCAA DIII second round
2018–19	Bethany Lutheran	18–8	13–3	2nd	
2019–20	Bethany Lutheran	20–9	13–3	2nd	NCAA DIII first round
Bethany Lutheran:		76–33 (.697)	52–12 (.813)		
Concordia–St. Paul (NSIC) (2020–present)
2020–21	Concordia–St. Paul	1–13	0–10	8th (South)	
2021–22	Concordia–St. Paul	3–25	2–19	16th / 8th (South)	
2022–23	Concordia–St. Paul	8–20	6–16	15th / 8th (South)	
2023–24	Concordia–St. Paul	10–18	5–17	13th	
2024–25	Concordia–St. Paul	22–9	16–6	T–1st	NCAA DII second round
2025–26	Concordia–St. Paul	19–10	14–8	T–3rd / T–3rd (South)	
Concordia–St. Paul:		63–95 (.399)	43–76 (.361)		
Total:		140–127 (.524)			
National champion Postseason invitational champion Conference regular season champion Conference regular season and conference tournament champion Division regular season champion Division regular season and conference tournament champion Conference tournament champion
