= 2023 Presbyterian Blue Hose football team =

American college football season

2023 Presbyterian Blue Hose football
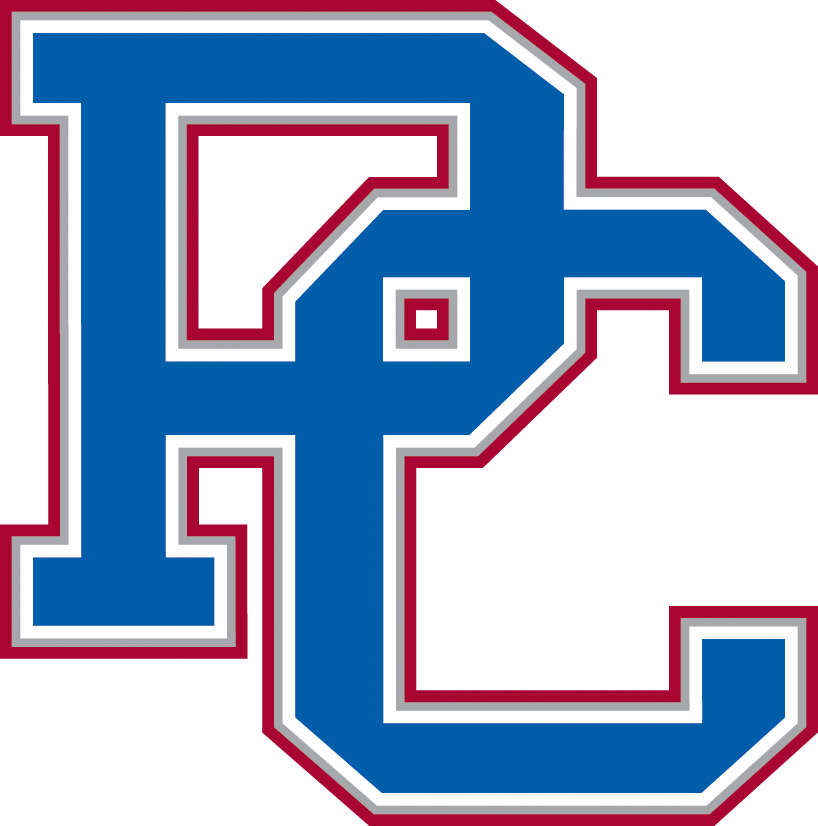
- Conference: Pioneer Football League
- Record: 4–7 (2–6 PFL)
- Head coach: Steve Englehart (2nd season)
- Defensive coordinator: Daniel Owen (2nd season)
- Home stadium: Bailey Memorial Stadium

2023 Pioneer Football League standings
	Conf.			Overall
Team	W		L	W		L
Drake $^	8	–	0	8	–	4
St. Thomas (MN) *	7	–	1	8	–	3
Davidson	6	–	2	7	–	4
Butler	5	–	3	7	–	4
Marist	4	–	4	4	–	7
San Diego	4	–	4	4	–	7
Morehead State	3	–	5	4	–	7
Presbyterian	2	–	6	4	–	7
Valparaiso	2	–	6	3	–	8
Dayton	2	–	6	4	–	7
Stetson	1	–	7	3	–	8
$ – Conference champion; ^ – FCS playoff participant; * – St. Thomas (MN) ineligible for FCS postseason play due to transition from NCAA Division III; Rankings from STATS Poll

The 2023 Presbyterian Blue Hose football team represented Presbyterian College as a member of the Pioneer Football League (PFL) during the 2023 NCAA Division I FCS football season. The Blue Hose were led by second-year head coach Steve Englehart and played home games at Bailey Memorial Stadium in Clinton, South Carolina.

== Schedule ==
Date	Time	Opponent	Site	TV	Result	Attendance
September 2	7:00 p.m.	at Murray State*	Roy Stewart Stadium; Murray, KY	ESPN+	L 10–41	6,953
September 9	1:00 p.m.	Virginia–Lynchburg*	Bailey Memorial Stadium; Clinton, SC	ESPN+	W 48–17	1,208
September 16	6:00 p.m.	at Wofford*	Gibbs Stadium; Spartanburg, SC	ESPN+	W 23–20	3,907
September 30	1:00 p.m.	at Butler	Bud and Jackie Sellick Bowl; Indianapolis, IN	FloSports	L 17–27	3,302
October 7	1:00 p.m.	Stetson	Bailey Memorial Stadium; Clinton, SC	ESPN+	L 24-28	1,202
October 14	1:00 p.m.	at Dayton	Welcome Stadium; Dayton, OH	ESPN+	W 20–17 ^{OT}	2,365
October 21	1:00 p.m.	Marist^{†}	Bailey Memorial Stadium; Clinton, SC	ESPN+	L 10–19	1,921
October 28	7:00 p.m.	at Davidson	Richardson Stadium; Davidson, NC	ESPN+	L 28–45	4,119
November 4	12:00 p.m.	San Diego	Bailey Memorial Stadium; Clinton, SC	ESPN+	L 13–23	675
November 11	2:00 p.m.	at Drake	Drake Stadium; Des Moines, IA	ESPN+	L 14–16	2,278
November 18	1:00 p.m.	Morehead State	Bailey Memorial Stadium; Clinton, SC	ESPN+	W 31–27	1,265
*Non-conference game; ^{†}Homecoming; All times are in Eastern time
