= Trevor Andrews (American football) =

American football player and coach (born 1975)

Current position
- Title: Head coach
- Team: Dayton
- Conference: Pioneer
- Record: 27–17

Biographical details
- Born: c. 1975 (age 50–51); Nappanee, Indiana, U.S.
- Education: University of Dayton (1998)

Playing career
- 1994–1997: Dayton
- Position: Defensive back

Coaching career (HC unless noted)
- 1999: Illinois Wesleyan (GA/S)
- 2000: Randolph–Macon (ST/S)
- 2001–2002: William & Mary (def. assistant)
- 2003: William & Mary (CB)
- 2004–2012: William & Mary (DL)
- 2013: William & Mary (AHC/DL)
- 2014–2018: William & Mary (AHC/DC/LB)
- 2019–2022: Western Michigan (LB)
- 2023–present: Dayton

Administrative career (AD unless noted)
- 2010–2018: William & Mary (RC)

Head coaching record
- Overall: 27–17

Accomplishments and honors

Championships
- 1 PFL (2026)

Trevor Andrews (born c. 1975) is an American college football coach. He is the head football coach for the University of Dayton, a position he has held since 2023. He played college football for Dayton as a defensive back. He previously coached for Illinois Wesleyan; Randolph–Macon; William & Mary, where he led one of the best defensive line units in the NCAA Division I Football Championship Subdivision (FCS); and Western Michigan.

== Head coaching record ==
Year	Team	Overall	Conference	Standing	Bowl/playoffs
Dayton Flyers (Pioneer Football League) (2023–present)
2023	Dayton	4–7	2–6	T–8th	
2024	Dayton	6–5	4–4	T–6th	
2025	Dayton	7–4	5–3	T–4th	
2026	Dayton	10–1	7–1	T–1st	FCS Playoffs
Dayton:		27–17	18–14		
Total:		27–17			
