= 2023 Morehead State Eagles football team =

American college football season

2023 Morehead State Eagles football
- Conference: Pioneer Football League
- Record: 4–7 (3–5 PFL)
- Head coach: Rob Tenyer (11th season)
- Defensive coordinator: Andrew Strobel (3rd season)
- Home stadium: Jayne Stadium

2023 Pioneer Football League standings
	Conf.			Overall
Team	W		L	W		L
Drake $^	8	–	0	8	–	4
St. Thomas (MN) *	7	–	1	8	–	3
Davidson	6	–	2	7	–	4
Butler	5	–	3	7	–	4
Marist	4	–	4	4	–	7
San Diego	4	–	4	4	–	7
Morehead State	3	–	5	4	–	7
Presbyterian	2	–	6	4	–	7
Valparaiso	2	–	6	3	–	8
Dayton	2	–	6	4	–	7
Stetson	1	–	7	3	–	8
$ – Conference champion; ^ – FCS playoff participant; * – St. Thomas (MN) ineligible for FCS postseason play due to transition from NCAA Division III; Rankings from STATS Poll

The 2023 Morehead State Eagles football team represented Morehead State University as a member of the Pioneer Football League (PFL) during the 2023 NCAA Division I FCS football season. The Eagles were led by 11th-year head coach Rob Tenyer and played home games at Jayne Stadium in Morehead, Kentucky.

== Schedule ==
Date	Time	Opponent	Site	TV	Result	Attendance
August 31	6:00 p.m.	West Virginia State*	Jayne Stadium; Morehead, KY	ESPN+	W 37–35	7,147
September 9	7:00 p.m.	at No. 20 Mercer*	Five Star Stadium; Macon, GA	ESPN+	L 22–48	10,722
September 23	2:00 p.m.	at St. Thomas (MN)	O'Shaughnessy Stadium; Saint Paul, MN	ESPN+	L 28–35	4,466
September 30	2:00 p.m.	Drake	Jayne Stadium; Morehead, KY	ESPN+	L 9–16	6,876
October 7	1:00 p.m.	Dayton	Jayne Stadium; Morehead, KY	ESPN+	W 31–7	6,334
October 14	2:00 p.m.	at Valparaiso	Brown Field; Valparaiso, IN	ESPN+	W 24–21	1,101
October 21	7:00 p.m.	at Tarleton State*	Memorial Stadium; Stephenville, TX	ESPN+	L 0–42	23,042
October 28	5:00 p.m.	at San Diego	Torero Stadium; San Diego, CA	ESPN+	L 11–17	1,593
November 4	2:00 p.m.	Butler^{†}	Jayne Stadium; Morehead, KY	ESPN+	L 7–49	8,868
November 11	1:00 p.m.	Davidson	Jayne Stadium; Morehead, KY	ESPN+	W 47–17	5,675
November 18	1:00 p.m.	at Presbyterian	Bailey Memorial Stadium; Clinton, SC	ESPN+	L 27–31	1,265
*Non-conference game; ^{†}Homecoming; Rankings from STATS Poll released prior to the game; All times are in Eastern time
