= Leland Bush =

American lawyer

The Honorable Leland Bush

Senior Judge of the District Court of Minnesota
- Incumbent
- Assumed office 2018

Judge of the District Court of Minnesota
- In office 2002–2018
- Appointed by: Jesse Ventura
- Preceded by: George Marshall
- Succeeded by: Tricia Zimmer

Personal details
- Born: Russell, Minnesota, U.S.
- Education: Macalester College; Southwest State University (BA); University of Minnesota Law School (JD)

Leland O. Bush (born c. 1951) is an American lawyer and judge, who has served as a judge of the District Court of Minnesota since 2002, when he was appointed by Governor Jesse Ventura. He was elected to a full term in 2004. He was re-elected in 2010 and in 2016.

== Early life and education ==
Born in Russell, Minnesota. Bush attended Macalester College in St. Paul, Minnesota. Bush's eldest brother was roommates with Kofi Annan while at Macalester College. Bush transferred to Southwest State University in Marshall, Minnesota, where he earned a B.A. in biology from in May 1973. Bush attended the University of Minnesota Law School, graduating with his J.D. in 1976.

== Legal career ==
Following his law school graduation, Bush was admitted to the Minnesota bar later that year. Bush worked for David Watson in Tyler, Minnesota before starting his own firm in 1979. In 2002, he was appointed to the District Court of Minnesota bench by Governor Jesse Ventura. Bush also worked as a city attorney during this period until his appointment to the Minnesota state bench.

== Judicial service ==
Bush was appointed by then-Governor Jesse Ventura on April 26, 2002. After being appointed to the position in April 2002, he was elected to a full term in 2004. Bush was re-elected to consecutive terms in 2010 and 2016. In 2018, Bush retired from active status after 16 years on the bench.
