= Mike Sterner =

American football coach

Coaching career (HC unless noted)

Football
- 1973–1976: Southwest State

Wrestling
- 1969–1998: Southwest State

Head coaching record
- Overall: 9–27 (football)

Mike Sterner is an American former football coach. He was the head football coach at Southwest State University—now known as Southwest Minnesota State University—in Marshall, Minnesota, serving for four seasons, from 1973 to 1976, and compiling a record of 9–27.

== Head coaching record ==
Year	Team	Overall	Conference	Standing	Bowl/playoffs
Southwest State Mustangs (Northern Intercollegiate Conference) (1973–1976)
1973	Southwest State	4–6	2–4	T–4th	
1974	Southwest State	4–5	2–4	T–5th	
1975	Southwest State	1–7	0–6	7th	
1976	Southwest State	0–9	0–7	8th	
Southwest State:		9–27	2–21		
Total:		9–27			
