= 2023 Dayton Flyers football team =

American college football season

2023 Dayton Flyers football
- Conference: Pioneer Football League
- Record: 4–7 (2–6 PFL)
- Head coach: Trevor Andrews (1st season)
- Offensive coordinator: Greg Whalen (1st season)
- Defensive coordinator: John Bowles (1st season)
- Home stadium: Welcome Stadium

2023 Pioneer Football League standings
	Conf.			Overall
Team	W		L	W		L
Drake $^	8	–	0	8	–	4
St. Thomas (MN) *	7	–	1	8	–	3
Davidson	6	–	2	7	–	4
Butler	5	–	3	7	–	4
Marist	4	–	4	4	–	7
San Diego	4	–	4	4	–	7
Morehead State	3	–	5	4	–	7
Presbyterian	2	–	6	4	–	7
Valparaiso	2	–	6	3	–	8
Dayton	2	–	6	4	–	7
Stetson	1	–	7	3	–	8
$ – Conference champion; ^ – FCS playoff participant; * – St. Thomas (MN) ineligible for FCS postseason play due to transition from NCAA Division III; Rankings from STATS Poll

The 2023 Dayton Flyers football team represented the University of Dayton as a member of the Pioneer Football League during the 2023 NCAA Division I FCS football season.Led by first-year head coach Trevor Andrews, the Flyers compiled an overall record of 4–7 with a mark of 2–6 in conference play, placing in a three-way tie for eighth in the PFL. Dayton played home games at Welcome Stadium in Dayton, Ohio.

== Schedule ==
Date	Time	Opponent	Site	TV	Result	Attendance
September 2	1:00 p.m.	at Illinois State*	Hancock Stadium; Normal, IL	ESPN+	L 0–41	6,740
September 9	1:00 p.m.	Central State*	Welcome Stadium; Dayton, OH		W 62–24	3,104
September 16	1:00 p.m.	Taylor*	Welcome Stadium; Dayton, OH		W 52–20	4,018
September 23	5:00 p.m.	at San Diego	Torero Stadium; San Diego, CA	ESPN+	L 25–40	934
September 30	1:00 p.m.	St. Thomas (MN)	Welcome Stadium; Dayton, OH	ESPN+	L 14–20	6,361
October 7	1:00 p.m.	at Morehead State	Jayne Stadium; Morehead, KY	ESPN+	L 7–31	6,334
October 14	1:00 p.m.	Presbyterian	Welcome Stadium; Dayton, OH	ESPN+	L 17–20 ^{OT}	2,365
October 21	1:00 p.m.	Butler	Welcome Stadium; Dayton, OH	ESPN+	L 10–37	2,785
November 4	2:00 p.m.	at Valparaiso	Brown Field; Valparaiso, IN	ESPN+	L 7–21	1,829
November 11	1:00 p.m.	Marist	Welcome Stadium; Dayton, OH	ESPN+	W 35–6	5,153
November 18	7:00 p.m.	at Davidson	Richardson Stadium; Davidson, NC	ESPN+	W 45–14	4,402
*Non-conference game; All times are in Eastern time
