= Students United =

Coordinates: 44°57′30″N 93°6′15″W

Students United, formerly called the Minnesota State University Student Association or MSUSA, is a non-profit organization funded and operated by students, founded in 1967 by Tim Penny. The Association serves nearly 65,000 students attending Minnesota's seven state universities: Bemidji State University, Minnesota State University, Mankato, Metropolitan State University, Minnesota State University Moorhead, St. Cloud State University, Southwest Minnesota State University and Winona State University.

The association is recognized by the Minnesota State Colleges and Universities Board of Trustees and the Minnesota State Legislature as the respective representative of state university students in Minnesota, and works on a variety of issues at the different levels of government.

== Structure ==
=== 501(c)(3) ===
Students United is a 501(c)(3) nonprofit organization, which means it is exempt from federal income tax. Additionally, this means that Students United is prohibited from supporting political candidates, making it a nonpartisan organization.

=== Board of directors ===
The organization is governed by a board of directors composed of the elected student body presidents at each of the seven state universities and three non-voting statewide officers; a State Chair, Vice Chair, and Treasurer. These board members govern and set the vision for the organization.

=== Officers ===
The State Chair is elected by the Board of Directors each spring. The State Chair is the spokesperson for the organization. They are responsible for representing the Board of Directors and chairs all of their meetings as a non-voting member. Additionally, the State Chair or their designee represents the organization at the Student Advisory Council (SAC) of the Office of Higher Education (OHE) and is responsible for testifying to the Minnesota State Colleges and Universities (Minn State) Board of Trustees meetings at their monthly meetings, which they may also delegate to another student. The State Chair also appoints state university students to Minnesota State system-level committees and task forces.

The Vice Chair performs the duties of the State Chair in their absence or at the State Chair's request. The Vice Chair serves as the chair of the Delegate Assembly Committee and is the co-chair of the Scholarship and Alumni Board.

The Treasurer oversees the financial updates of the organization and works with the staff and the organization accountant to produce monthly statements and an annual audit.

The Vice Chair and Treasurer are elected by a committee appointed by the Board of Directors. Officers' terms are for one year, beginning July 1 and ending June 30.

=== Staff ===
Students United has a team of full-time, professional staff members who work out of their office at Fueled Collective in Northeast Minneapolis. The Executive Director supervises and manages the staff and acts as the liaison between the staff and the Board of Directors. The Executive Director is hired and supervised by the Board of Directors.

Other staff positions include:

- Director of Development
- Director of Equity and Inclusion
- Director of Government Relations
- Director of Operations
- Director of Public Relations
- Director of System Relations
- Office Manager
