= 2023 Butler Bulldogs football team =

American college football season

2023 Butler Bulldogs football
- Conference: Pioneer Football League
- Record: 7–4 (5–3 PFL)
- Head coach: Mike Uremovich (2nd season)
- Offensive coordinator: Alex Barr (1st season)
- Defensive coordinator: Jeff Knowles (2nd season)
- Home stadium: Bud and Jackie Sellick Bowl

2023 Pioneer Football League standings
	Conf.			Overall
Team	W		L	W		L
Drake $^	8	–	0	8	–	4
St. Thomas (MN) *	7	–	1	8	–	3
Davidson	6	–	2	7	–	4
Butler	5	–	3	7	–	4
Marist	4	–	4	4	–	7
San Diego	4	–	4	4	–	7
Morehead State	3	–	5	4	–	7
Presbyterian	2	–	6	4	–	7
Valparaiso	2	–	6	3	–	8
Dayton	2	–	6	4	–	7
Stetson	1	–	7	3	–	8
$ – Conference champion; ^ – FCS playoff participant; * – St. Thomas (MN) ineligible for FCS postseason play due to transition from NCAA Division III; Rankings from STATS Poll

The 2023 Butler Bulldogs football team represented Butler University as a member of the Pioneer Football League (PFL) during the 2023 NCAA Division I FCS football season. Led by second-year head coach Mike Uremovich, the Bulldogs compiled an overall record of 7–4 with a mark of 5–3 in conference play, placing fourth in the PFL. Butler played home games at the Bud and Jackie Sellick Bowl in Indianapolis.

== Schedule ==
Date	Time	Opponent	Site	TV	Result	Attendance
September 2	2:00 p.m.	at No. 14 Montana*	Washington–Grizzly Stadium; Missoula, MT	ESPN+	L 20–35	25,430
September 9	1:00 p.m.	Taylor*	Bud and Jackie Sellick Bowl; Indianapolis, IN	FloSports	W 41–13	3,113
September 16	6:00 p.m.	Wabash*	Bud and Jackie Sellick Bowl; Indianapolis, IN	FloSports	W 47–21	6,271
September 23	12:00 p.m.	at Stetson	Spec Martin Stadium; DeLand, FL	YouTube	W 28–18	1,128
September 30	1:00 p.m.	Presbyterian	Bud and Jackie Sellick Bowl; Indianapolis, IN	FloSports	W 27–17	3,302
October 7	1:00 p.m.	at St. Thomas (MN)	O'Shaughnessy Stadium; Saint Paul, MN	Midco Sports Plus	L 10–17	4,855
October 14	1:00 p.m.	Davidson	Bud and Jackie Sellick Bowl; Indianapolis, IN	FloSports	L 33–35	1,873
October 21	1:00 p.m.	at Dayton	Welcome Stadium; Dayton, OH	Facebook Live	W 37–10	2,785
October 28	1:00 p.m.	Valparaiso^{†}	Bud and Jackie Sellick Bowl; Indianapolis, IN	FloSports	W 17–7	4,224
November 4	2:00 p.m.	at Morehead State	Jayne Stadium; Morehead, KY	ESPN+	W 49–7	8,868
November 18	12:00 p.m.	Drake	Bud and Jackie Sellick Bowl; Indianapolis, IN	FloSports	L 9–13	2,788
*Non-conference game; ^{†}Homecoming; Rankings from STATS Poll released prior to the game; All times are in Eastern time

== Game summaries ==
=== No. 14 Montana ===
Game One – Butler Bulldogs (0–0) at No. 14 Montana Grizzlies (0–0) – Game summary

Quarter	1	2	3	4	Total
Bulldogs	3	3	14	0	20
No. 14 Grizzlies	10	11	7	7	35

at Washington-Grizzly Stadium • Missoula, Montana

- Date: Saturday, September 2, 2023
- Game time: 2:00 p.m. EDT
- Game weather: Sunny • Temperature: 72 °F (22 °C)
- Game attendance: 25,430
- Referee: Kelly Holman
- TV announcers (ESPN+): Ron Davis (play-by-play) and Grady Bennett (analyst)

Game information

First quarter

- (14:00) MONT – Junior Bergen 54-yard pass from Sam Vidak, Grant Glasgow kick (Drive: 3 plays, 68 yards, 0:55; Montana 7–0)
- (9:45) MONT – Grant Glasgow 23-yard field goal (Drive: 4 plays, 4 yards, 1:30; Montana 10–0)
- (6:00) BUT – Luka Zurak 29-yard field goal (Drive: 6 plays, 27 yards, 1:15; Montana 10–3)

Second quarter

- (9:43) MONT – Grant Glasgow 49-yard field goal (Drive: 14 plays, 44 yards, 5:35; Montana 13–3)
- (6:00) BUT – Luka Zurak 39-yard field goal (Drive: 8 plays, 53 yards, 3:43; Montana 13–6)
- (3:05) MONT – Xavier Harris 3-yard run, Ryder Meyer run (Drive: 7 plays, 68 yards, 2:50; Montana 21–6)

Third quarter

- (6:57) BUT – Jyran Mitchell 32-yard pass from Bret Bushka, Luka Zurak kick (Drive: 5 plays, 75 yards, 1:40; Montana 21–13)
- (4:48) BUT – Ryan Lezon 26-yard pass from Bret Bushka, Luka Zurak kick (Drive: 4 plays, 34 yards, 1:23; Montana 21–20)
- (3:41) MONT – Eli Gillman 24-yard run, Grant Glasgow kick (Drive: 3 plays, 50 yards, 1:00; Montana 28–20)

Fourth quarter

- (6:34) MONT – Clifton McDowell 1-yard run, Grant Glasgow kick (Drive: 9 plays, 63 yards, 4:29; Montana 35–20)

Statistics	BUT	MONT
First downs	15	24
Total yards	304	441
Rushing yards	41	230
Passing yards	263	211
Passing: Comp–Att–Int	24–36–1	17–29–2
Time of possession	28:45	31:15

Team	Category	Player	Statistics
Butler	Passing	Bret Bushka	24/35, 263 yards, 2 TD, INT
Butler	Rushing	Jyran Mitchell	12 carries, 23 yards
Butler	Receiving	Ryan Lezon	2 receptions, 55 yards, TD
Montana	Passing	Sam Vidlak	15/25, 180 yards, TD, 2 INT
Montana	Rushing	Eli Gillman	19 carries, 119 yards, TD
Montana	Receiving	Junior Bergen	4 receptions, 72 yards, TD

=== Taylor (NAIA) ===
Game Two – Taylor Trojans (NAIA) (1–1) at Butler Bulldogs (0–1) – Game summary

Quarter	1	2	3	4	Total
Trojans (NAIA)	0	7	0	6	13
Bulldogs	14	3	21	3	41

at Bud and Jackie Sellick Bowl • Indianapolis, Indiana

- Date: Saturday, September 9, 2023
- Game time: 1:00 p.m. EDT
- Game weather: Sunny • Temperature: 68 °F (20 °C) • Wind: SW at 8 miles per hour (13 km/h)
- Game attendance: 3,113
- Referee: Michael Hoffman
- TV: FloFootball

Game information

First quarter

- (13:00) BUT – Jyran Mitchell 1-yard run, Luka Zurak kick (Drive: 5 plays, 66 yards, 2:00; Butler 7–0)
- (5:36) BUT – Jyran Mitchell 60-yard run, Luka Zurak kick (Drive: 1 play, 60 yards, 0:09; Butler 14–0)

Second quarter

- (8:57) BUT – Luka Zurak 23-yard field goal (Drive: 15 plays, 75 yards, 7:38; Butler 17–0)
- (3:15) TAY – Ja Thomas 24-yard pass from Damon Hockett, Isaac Hoke kick (Drive: 10 plays, 79 yards, 5:36; Butler 17–7)

Third quarter

- (10:43) BUT – Luke Wooten 36-yard pass from Bret Bushka, Luka Zurak kick (Drive: 3 plays, 39 yards, 1:47; Butler 24–7)
- (9:19) BUT – Jyran Mitchell 63-yard run, Luka Zurak kick (Drive: 1 play, 63 yards, 0:10; Butler 31–7)
- (3:18) BUT – Harry Ochs fumble recovery in end zone, Luka Zurak kick (Butler 38–7)

Fourth quarter

- (9:13) BUT – Luka Zurak 20-yard field goal (Drive: 15 plays, 69 yards, 7:11; Butler 41–7)
- (9:01) TAY – Dakohta Sonnichsen 75-yard pass from Stephen Ellis (Drive: 1 play, 75 yards, 0:12; Butler 41–13)

Statistics	TAY	BUT
First downs	13	16
Total yards	325	439
Rushing yards	156	254
Passing yards	169	185
Passing: Comp–Att–Int	11–20–0	14–23–0
Time of possession	32:18	27:42

Team	Category	Player	Statistics
Taylor	Passing	Damon Hockett	10/19, 94 yards, TD
Taylor	Rushing	Stephen Ellis	6 carries, 42 yards
Taylor	Receiving	Dakohta Sonnichsen	1 reception, 75 yards, TD
Butler	Passing	Bret Bushka	13/22, 185 yards, TD
Butler	Rushing	Jyran Mitchell	12 carries, 178 yards, 3 TD
Butler	Receiving	Ethan Loss	4 receptions, 79 yards

=== Wabash (DIII) ===
Game Three – Wabash Little Giants (DIII) (1–0) at Butler Bulldogs (1–1) – Game summary

Quarter	1	2	3	4	Total
Little Giants (DIII)	0	14	0	7	21
Bulldogs	7	17	9	14	47

at Bud and Jackie Sellick Bowl • Indianapolis, Indiana

- Date: Saturday, September 16, 2023
- Game time: 6:00 p.m. EDT
- Game weather: Sunny • Temperature: 70 °F (21 °C) • Wind: NW at 4 miles per hour (6.4 km/h)
- Game attendance: 6,271
- Referee: Gregory Gompf
- TV announcers (FloFootball): Greg Rakestraw (play-by-play)

Game information

First quarter

- (10:01) BUT – Bret Bushka 1-yard run, Luka Zurak kick (Drive: 9 plays, 75 yards, 4:51; Butler 7–0)

Second quarter

- (13:36) BUT – Ethan Loss 30-yard pass from Bret Bushka, Luka Zurak kick (Drive: 7 plays, 80 yards, 2:48; Butler 14–0)
- (9:21) BUT – Jyran Mitchell 7-yard run, Luka Zurak kick (Drive: 6 plays, 54 yards, 3:21; Butler 21–0)
- (3:43) WAB – Cade Campbell 9-yard pass from Jacob Riddle, Brody Rucker kick (Drive: 10 plays, 75 yards, 5:38; Butler 21–7)
- (0:16) WAB – Derek Allen Jr. 22-yard pass from Liam Thompson, Brody Rucker kick (Drive: 8 plays, 75 yards, 1:37; Butler 21–14)
- (0:00) BUT – Luka Zurak 48-yard field goal (Drive: 2 plays, 30 yards, 0:11; Butler 24–14)

Third quarter

- (6:42) BUT – Liam Thompson sacked in end zone for a safety (Butler 26–14)
- (3:14) BUT – Ershod Jasey II 4-yard run, Luka Zurak kick (Drive: 6 plays, 45 yards, 3:20; Butler 33–14)

Fourth quarter

- (12:44) WAB – Jacob Riddle 18-yard pass from Liam Thompson, Brody Rucker kick (Drive: 9 plays, 75 yards, 5:30; Butler 33–21)
- (8:38) BUT – Luke Wooten 22-yard pass from Bret Bushka, Luka Zurak kick (Drive: 7 plays, 75 yards, 4:06; Butler 40–21)
- (5:32) BUT – Nick Bafia 66-yard interception return, Luka Zurak kick (Butler 47–21)

Statistics	WAB	BUT
First downs	21	26
Total yards	338	442
Rushing yards	62	244
Passing yards	276	198
Passing: Comp–Att–Int	24–34–1	13–18–0
Time of possession	32:16	27:44

Team	Category	Player	Statistics
Wabash	Passing	Liam Thompson	22/32, 256 yards, 2 TD, INT
Wabash	Rushing	Cade Campbell	6 carries, 36 yards
Wabash	Receiving	Derek Allen Jr.	10 receptions, 99 yards, TD
Butler	Passing	Bret Bushka	13/18, 198 yards, 2 TD
Butler	Rushing	Jyran Mitchell	13 carries, 82 yards, TD
Butler	Receiving	Ethan Loss	4 receptions, 73 yards, TD

=== at Stetson ===
Game Four – Butler Bulldogs (2–1) at Stetson Hatters (2–1) – Game summary

Quarter	1	2	3	4	Total
Bulldogs	0	14	7	7	28
Hatters	0	0	7	11	18

at Spec Martin Stadium • DeLand, Florida

- Date: Saturday, September 23, 2023
- Game time: 12:00 p.m. EDT
- Game weather: Sunny
- Game attendance: 1,128
- Referee: Drew Myers
- TV: YouTube

Game information

First quarter

No Scoring Plays

Second quarter

- (11:28) BUT – Bret Bushka 2-yard run, Luka Zurak kick (Drive: 14 plays, 58 yards, 7:27; Butler 7–0)
- (6:27) BUT – Ershod Jasey II 28-yard run, Luka Zurak kick (Drive: 8 plays, 64 yards, 4:01; Butler 14–0)

Third quarter

- (5:52) STET – Rassie Littlejohn 30-yard interception return, Daniel Holbrook kick (Butler 14–7)
- (3:30) BUT – Jyran Mitchell 58-yard run, Luka Zurak kick (Drive: 2 plays, 58 yards, 0:55; Butler 21–7)

Fourth quarter

- (10:07) STET – Daniel Holbrook 39-yard field goal (Drive: 10 plays, 43 yards, 4:53; Butler 21–10)
- (2:02) STET – Gabe Atkin 2-yard pass from Brady Meitz, Nazeviah Burris run (Drive: 11 plays, 90 yards, 3:43; Butler 21–18)
- (1:46) BUT – Jyran Mitchell 43-yard run, Luka Zurak kick (Drive: 2 plays, 48 yards, 0:15; Butler 28–18)

Statistics	BUT	STET
First downs	15	15
Total yards	376	258
Rushing yards	322	91
Passing yards	54	167
Passing: Comp–Att–Int	9–19–1	18–32–3
Time of possession	33:25	26:35

Team	Category	Player	Statistics
Butler	Passing	Bret Bushka	9/19, 54 yards, INT
Butler	Rushing	Jyran Mitchell	26 carries, 209 yards, 2 TD
Butler	Receiving	Ethan Loss	3 receptions, 15 yards
Stetson	Passing	Matt O'Connor	10/16, 106 yards
Stetson	Rushing	Kadarris Roberts	16 carries, 62 yards
Stetson	Receiving	Gabe Atkin	8 receptions, 83 yards, TD

=== Presbyterian ===
Game Five – Presbyterian Blue Hose (2–1) at Butler Bulldogs (3–1) – Game summary

Quarter	1	2	3	4	Total
Blue Hose	7	10	0	0	17
Bulldogs	7	7	7	6	27

at Bud and Jackie Sellick Bowl • Indianapolis, Indiana

- Date: Saturday, September 30, 2023
- Game time: 1:00 p.m. EDT
- Game weather: Sunny • Temperature: 73 °F (23 °C) • Wind: E at 3 miles per hour (4.8 km/h)
- Game attendance: 3,302
- Referee: Rich Fisher
- TV: FloFootball

Game information

First quarter

- (9:52) BUT – Jyran Mitchell 12-yard run, Luka Zurak kick (Drive: 7 plays, 56 yards, 3:15; Butler 7–0)
- (9:02) PRES – Dominic Kibby 93-yard pass from Tyler Wesley, Mack Mikko kick (Drive: 2 plays, 93 yards, 0:48; Tied 7–7)

Second quarter

- (8:17) BUT – Bret Bushka 6-yard run, Luka Zurak kick (Drive: 13 plays, 72 yards, 6:43; Butler 14–7)
- (8:05) PRES – Dominic Kibby 75-yard pass from Tyler Wesley, Mack Mikko kick (Drive: 1 play, 75 yards, 0:12; Tied 14–14)
- (4:58) PRES – Mack Mikko 44-yard field goal (Drive: 5 plays, 20 yards, 2:23; Presbyterian 17–14)

Third quarter

- (6:12) BUT – Ryan Lezon 14-yard pass from Bret Bushka, Luka Zurak kick (Drive: 16 plays, 85 yards, 8:48; Butler 21–17)

Fourth quarter

- (7:20) BUT – Luka Zurak 23-yard field goal (Drive: 14 plays, 64 yards, 6:51; Butler 24–17)
- (2:26) BUT – Luka Zurak 20-yard field goal (Drive: 8 plays, 79 yards, 3:10; Butler 27–17)

Statistics	PRES	BUT
First downs	13	30
Total yards	356	464
Rushing yards	33	299
Passing yards	323	165
Passing: Comp–Att–Int	17–28–0	18–27–1
Time of possession	18:41	41:19

Team	Category	Player	Statistics
Presbyterian	Passing	Tyler Wesley	17/28, 323 yards, 2 TD
Presbyterian	Rushing	Zach Switzer	6 carries, 21 yards
Presbyterian	Receiving	Dominic Kibby	5 receptions, 199 yards, 2 TD
Butler	Passing	Bret Bushka	17/26, 148 yards, TD, INT
Butler	Rushing	Jyran Mitchell	31 carries, 149 yards, TD
Butler	Receiving	Ethan Loss	4 receptions, 36 yards

=== at St. Thomas (MN) ===
Game Six – Butler Bulldogs (4–1) at St. Thomas Tommies (3–2) – Game summary

Quarter	1	2	3	4	Total
Bulldogs	0	3	0	7	10
Tommies	3	7	7	0	17

at O'Shaughnessy Stadium • Saint Paul, Minnesota

- Date: Saturday, October 7, 2023
- Game time: 1:00 p.m. EDT
- Game weather: Cloudy • Temperature: 50 °F (10 °C) • Wind: SE at 7 miles per hour (11 km/h)
- Game attendance: 4,855
- Referee: Tim Duffy
- TV: Midco Sports Plus

Game information

First quarter

- (10:25) STMN – Stephen Shagen 35-yard field goal (Drive: 9 plays, 52 yards, 4:29; St. Thomas 3–0)

Second quarter

- (14:56) STMN – Hope Adebayo 2-yard run, Stephen Shagen kick (Drive: 8 plays, 44 yards, 4:37; St. Thomas 10–0)
- (0:33) BUT – Luka Zurak 21-yard field goal (Drive: 15 plays, 61 yards, 8:07; St. Thomas 10–3)

Third quarter

- (4:39) STMN – Hope Adebayo 27-yard run, Stephen Shagen kick (Drive: 9 plays, 88 yards, 5:21; St. Thomas 17–3)

Fourth quarter

- (8:34) BUT – Jyran Mitchell 10-yard run, Luka Zurak kick (Drive: 6 plays, 35 yards, 1:31; St. Thomas 17–10)

Statistics	BUT	STMN
First downs	18	12
Total yards	262	300
Rushing yards	151	229
Passing yards	111	71
Passing: Comp–Att–Int	16–31–0	5–8–0
Time of possession	28:56	31:04

Team	Category	Player	Statistics
Butler	Passing	Bret Bushka	16/31, 111 yards
Butler	Rushing	Bret Bushka	16 carries, 63 yards
Butler	Receiving	Ryan Lezon	4 receptions, 35 yards
St. Thomas (MN)	Passing	Tak Tateoka	5/8, 71 yards
St. Thomas (MN)	Rushing	Shawn Shipman	22 carries, 103 yards
St. Thomas (MN)	Receiving	Andrew McElroy	2 receptions, 32 yards

=== Davidson ===
Game Seven – Davidson Wildcats (4–1) at Butler Bulldogs (4–2) – Game summary

Quarter	1	2	3	4	Total
Wildcats	7	21	7	0	35
Bulldogs	7	7	10	9	33

at Bud and Jackie Sellick Bowl • Indianapolis, Indiana

- Date: Saturday, October 14, 2023
- Game time: 1:00 p.m. EDT
- Game weather: Cloudy • Temperature: 54 °F (12 °C) • Wind: W at 10 miles per hour (16 km/h)
- Game attendance: 1,873
- Referee: Rodney Smith
- TV: FloFootball

Game information

First quarter

- (12:11) DAV – Brody Reina 46-yard pass from Coulter Cleland, Adam Zouagui kick (Drive: 6 plays, 87 yards, 2:44; Davidson 7–0)
- (9:16) BUT – Ryan Lezon 8-yard pass from Bret Bushka, Luka Zurak kick (Drive: 5 plays, 59 yards, 2:50; Tied 7–7)

Second quarter

- (8:41) DAV – Mari Adams 1-yard run, Adam Zouagui kick (Drive: 6 plays, 18 yards, 2:06; Davidson 14–7)
- (7:13) BUT – Bret Bushka 60-yard run, Luka Zurak kick (Drive: 3 plays, 68 yards, 1:21; Tied 14–14)
- (4:11) DAV – Mari Adams 36-yard run, Adam Zouagui kick (Drive: 6 plays, 71 yards, 2:56; Davidson 21–14)
- (1:17) DAV – Adam Maione 25-yard pass from Coulter Cleland, Adam Zouagui kick (Drive: 4 plays, 67 yards, 1:14; Davidson 28–14)

Third quarter

- (10:24) BUT – Jeremy Johnson 22-yard return of blocked punt, Luka Zurak kick (Davidson 28–21)
- (2:41) BUT – Luka Zurak 40-yard field goal (Drive: 6 plays, 25 yards, 3:35; Davidson 28–24)
- (0:00) DAV – Mari Adams 8-yard run, Adam Zouagui kick (Drive: 6 plays, 65 yards, 2:41; Davidson 35–24)

Fourth quarter

- (10:10) BUT – Luka Zurak 29-yard field goal (Drive: 12 plays, 63 yards, 4:50; Davidson 35–27)
- (6:24) BUT – Jyran Mitchell 4-yard run (Drive: 4 plays, 50 yards, 1:57; Davidson 35–33)

Statistics	DAV	BUT
First downs	23	14
Total yards	506	345
Rushing yards	282	215
Passing yards	224	130
Passing: Comp–Att–Int	19–20–1	14–31–1
Time of possession	37:20	22:40

Team	Category	Player	Statistics
Davidson	Passing	Coulter Cleland	19/20, 224 yards, 2 TD, INT
Davidson	Rushing	Mari Adams	30 carries, 171 yards, 3 TD
Davidson	Receiving	Mark McCurdy	6 receptions, 81 yards
Butler	Passing	Bret Bushka	13/29, 129 yards, TD, INT
Butler	Rushing	Jyran Mitchell	16 carries, 123 yards, TD
Butler	Receiving	Ethan Loss	3 receptions, 43 yards

=== at Dayton ===
Game Eight – Butler Bulldogs (4–3) at Dayton Flyers (2–5) – Game summary

Quarter	1	2	3	4	Total
Bulldogs	13	7	3	14	37
Flyers	0	3	0	7	10

at Welcome Stadium • Dayton, Ohio

- Date: Saturday, October 21, 2023
- Game time: 1:00 p.m. EDT
- Game weather: Rain • Temperature: 59 °F (15 °C) • Wind: SW at 7 miles per hour (11 km/h)
- Game attendance: 2,785
- Referee: Jason Perkins
- TV: Facebook Live

Game information

First quarter

- (7:07) BUT – Luka Zurak 24-yard field goal (Drive: 11 plays, 41 yards, 5:52; Butler 3–0)
- (5:21) BUT – Jyran Mitchell 24-yard run, Luka Zurak kick (Drive: 1 play, 24 yards, 0:10; Butler 10–0)
- (1:39) BUT – Luka Zurak 46-yard field goal (Drive: 4 plays, 6 yards, 2:07; Butler 13–0)

Second quarter

- (10:07) DAY – Sam Webster 32-yard field goal (Drive: 14 plays, 60 yards, 6:32; Butler 13–3)
- (4:04) BUT – Jyran Mitchell 3-yard pass from Bret Bushka, Luka Zurak kick (Drive: 11 plays, 75 yards, 6:03; Butler 20–3)

Third quarter

- (8:26) BUT – Luka Zurak 36-yard field goal (Drive: 5 plays, 57 yards, 1:41; Butler 23–3)

Fourth quarter

- (5:42) DAY – Luke Hansen 2-yard run, Sam Webster kick (Drive: 18 plays, 67 yards, 6:50; Butler 23–10)
- (4:12) BUT – Jyran Mitchell 59-yard run, Luka Zurak kick (Drive: 3 plays, 75 yards, 1:30; Butler 30–10)
- (1:47) BUT – Ryan Lezon 9-yard pass from Bret Bushka, Luka Zurak kick (Drive: 4 plays, 12 yards, 1:13; Butler 37–10)

Statistics	BUT	DAY
First downs	16	17
Total yards	342	288
Rushing yards	151	105
Passing yards	191	183
Passing: Comp–Att–Int	18–23–1	30–49–0
Time of possession	27:57	32:03

Team	Category	Player	Statistics
Butler	Passing	Bret Bushka	18/23, 191 yards, 2 TD, INT
Butler	Rushing	Jyran Mitchell	16 carries, 117 yards, 2 TD
Butler	Receiving	Ethan Loss	6 receptions, 86 yards
Dayton	Passing	Drew VanVleet	30/48, 183 yards
Dayton	Rushing	Luke Hansen	9 carries, 54 yards, TD
Dayton	Receiving	Jake Coleman	7 receptions, 52 yards

=== Valparaiso (Hoosier Helmet Trophy) ===
Game Nine – Valparaiso Beacons (1–6) at Butler Bulldogs (5–3) – Game summary

Quarter	1	2	3	4	Total
Beacons	0	0	7	0	7
Bulldogs	0	0	14	3	17

at Bud and Jackie Sellick Bowl • Indianapolis, Indiana

- Date: Saturday, October 28, 2023
- Game time: 1:00 p.m. EDT
- Game weather: Sunny • Temperature: 50 °F (10 °C) • Wind: NE at 10 miles per hour (16 km/h)
- Game attendance: 4,224
- Referee: CJ Jackson
- TV: FloFootball

Game information

First quarter

No Scoring Plays

Second quarter

No Scoring Plays

Third quarter

- (10:16) BUT – Jyran Mitchell 67-yard run, Luka Zurak kick (Drive: 2 plays, 80 yards, 0:47; Butler 7–0)
- (10:01) VAL – Solomon Davis 70-yard run, Ryan Hawk kick (Drive: 1 play, 70 yards, 0:15; Tied 7–7)
- (0:00) BUT – Bret Bushka 3-yard run, Luka Zurak kick (Drive: 18 plays, 75 yards, 10:01; Butler 14–7)

Fourth quarter

- (3:15) BUT – Luka Zurak 32-yard field goal (Drive: 15 plays, 29 yards, 8:42; Butler 17–7)

Statistics	VAL	BUT
First downs	12	20
Total yards	289	331
Rushing yards	117	242
Passing yards	172	89
Passing: Comp–Att–Int	11–21–1	13–21–0
Time of possession	21:01	38:59

Team	Category	Player	Statistics
Valparaiso	Passing	Rowan Keefe	11/19, 172 yards, INT
Valparaiso	Rushing	Solomon Davis	1 carry, 70 yards, TD
Valparaiso	Receiving	Solomon Davis	2 receptions, 68 yards
Butler	Passing	Bret Bushka	13/21, 89 yards
Butler	Rushing	Jyran Mitchell	26 carries, 159 yards, TD
Butler	Receiving	Ethan Loss	4 receptions, 58 yards

=== at Morehead State ===
Game Ten – Butler Bulldogs (6–3) at Morehead State Eagles (3–5) – Game summary

Quarter	1	2	3	4	Total
Bulldogs	21	14	7	7	49
Eagles	7	0	0	0	7

at Jayne Stadium • Morehead, Kentucky

- Date: Saturday, November 4, 2023
- Game time: 2:00 p.m. EDT
- Game weather: Mostly Sunny • Temperature: 62 °F (17 °C)
- Game attendance: 8,868
- Referee: J. Bradford
- TV announcers (ESPN+): Jared Stacy and Hunter Hurst

Game information

First quarter

- (11:49) BUT – Ethan Loss 25-yard pass from Bret Bushka, Luka Zurak kick (Drive: 5 plays, 62 yards, 2:22; Butler 7–0)
- (6:53) BUT – Luke Wooten 28-yard pass from Bret Bushka, Luka Zurak kick (Drive: 5 plays, 50 yards, 2:35; Butler 14–0)
- (1:31) BUT – Jyran Mitchell 61-yard pass from Bret Bushka, Luka Zurak kick (Drive: 4 plays, 86 yards, 2:12; Butler 21–0)
- (0:51) MORE – Kyle Daly 68-yard pass from Carter Cravens, Nathan Hackett kick (Drive: 2 plays, 75 yards, 0:40; Butler 21–7)

Second quarter

- (9:22) BUT – Luke Wooten 21-yard pass from Bret Bushka, Luka Zurak kick (Drive: 11 plays, 75 yards, 6:29; Butler 28–7)
- (1:06) BUT – Jack Bill 55-yard pass from Bret Bushka, Luka Zurak kick (Drive: 4 plays, 65 yards, 0:47; Butler 35–7)

Third quarter

- (0:41) BUT – Bret Bushka 12-yard run, Luka Zurak kick (Drive: 8 plays, 71 yards, 5:05; Butler 42–7)

Fourth quarter

- (2:58) BUT – Patrick Coury 18-yard interception return, Luka Zurak kick (Butler 49–7)

Statistics	BUT	MORE
First downs	27	9
Total yards	482	247
Rushing yards	179	111
Passing yards	303	136
Passing: Comp–Att–Int	21–25–2	13–23–1
Time of possession	37:45	22:15

Team	Category	Player	Statistics
Butler	Passing	Bret Bushka	16/17, 281 yards, 5 TD, INT
Butler	Rushing	Jyran Mitchell	22 carries, 125 yards
Butler	Receiving	Luke Wooten	5 receptions, 88 yards, 2 TD
Morehead St	Passing	Carter Cravens	11/20, 126 yards, TD
Morehead St	Rushing	Jackson Lanier	12 carries, 78 yards
Morehead St	Receiving	Kyle Daly	5 receptions, 104 yards, TD

=== Drake ===
Game Eleven – Drake Bulldogs (7–3) at Butler Bulldogs (7–3) – Game summary

Quarter	1	2	3	4	Total
Drake	0	7	0	6	13
Butler	3	0	6	0	9

at Bud and Jackie Sellick Bowl • Indianapolis, Indiana

- Date: Saturday, November 18, 2023
- Game time: 12:00 p.m. EST
- Game weather: Sunny • Temperature: 48 °F (9 °C) • Wind: N at 2 miles per hour (3.2 km/h)
- Game attendance: 2,788
- Referee: Robert Guyton Jr.
- TV: FloFootball

Game information

First quarter

- (6:24) BUT – Luka Zurak 38-yard field goal (Drive: 10 plays, 68 yards, 5:01; Butler 3–0)

Second quarter

- (2:48) DRKE – Hunter Johnson 2-yard pass from Luke Bailey, Shane Dunning kick (Drive: 10 plays, 60 yards, 5:16; Drake 7–3)

Third quarter

- (7:32) BUT – Luka Zurak 23-yard field goal (Drive: 13 plays, 68 yards, 7:21; Drake 7–6)
- (0:21) BUT – Luka Zurak 48-yard field goal (Drive: 12 plays, 51 yards, 6:32; Butler 9–7)

Fourth quarter

- (2:43) DRKE – Dorian Boyland 2-yard run (Drive: 11 plays, 78 yards, 5:13; Drake 13–9)

Statistics	DRKE	BUT
First downs	15	19
Total yards	176	265
Rushing yards	56	125
Passing yards	120	140
Passing: Comp–Att–Int	16–28–0	21–34–0
Time of possession	22:43	37:17

Team	Category	Player	Statistics
Drake	Passing	Luke Bailey	16/28, 120 yards, TD
Drake	Rushing	Dorian Boyland	8 carries, 31 yards, TD
Drake	Receiving	Trey Radocha	3 receptions, 29 yards
Butler	Passing	Bret Bushka	21/34, 140 yards
Butler	Rushing	Jyran Mitchell	12 carries, 55 yards
Butler	Receiving	Luke Wooten	6 receptions, 65 yards
