= 2023 Marist Red Foxes football team =

American college football season

2023 Marist Red Foxes football
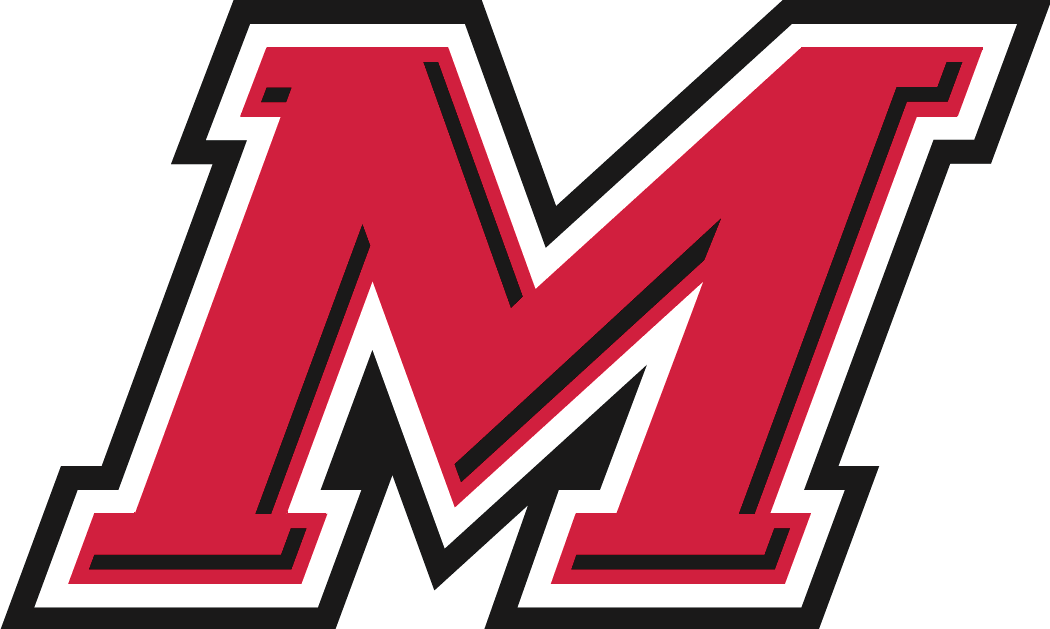
- Conference: Pioneer Football League
- Record: 4–7 (4–4 PFL)
- Head coach: Jim Parady (31st season)
- Offensive coordinator: Jake Dembow (4th season)
- Defensive coordinator: Scott Rumsey (24th season)
- Home stadium: Tenney Stadium at Leonidoff Field

2023 Pioneer Football League standings
	Conf.			Overall
Team	W		L	W		L
Drake $^	8	–	0	8	–	4
St. Thomas (MN) *	7	–	1	8	–	3
Davidson	6	–	2	7	–	4
Butler	5	–	3	7	–	4
Marist	4	–	4	4	–	7
San Diego	4	–	4	4	–	7
Morehead State	3	–	5	4	–	7
Presbyterian	2	–	6	4	–	7
Valparaiso	2	–	6	3	–	8
Dayton	2	–	6	4	–	7
Stetson	1	–	7	3	–	8
$ – Conference champion; ^ – FCS playoff participant; * – St. Thomas (MN) ineligible for FCS postseason play due to transition from NCAA Division III; Rankings from STATS Poll

The 2023 Marist Red Foxes football team represented Marist College as a member of the Pioneer Football League (PFL) during the 2023 NCAA Division I FCS football season. Led by Jim Parady in his 31st and final season as head coach, the Red Foxes compiled an overall record of 4–7 with a mark of 4–4 in conference play, tying for fifth place in the PFL. Marist played home games at Tenney Stadium at Leonidoff Field in Poughkeepsie, New York.

== Schedule ==
Date	Time	Opponent	Site	TV	Result	Attendance
September 2	12:30 p.m.	at Georgetown*	Cooper Field; Washington, DC	ESPN+	L 7–49	1,687
September 16	1:00 p.m.	Davidson	Leonidoff Field; Poughkeepsie, NY	ESPN+	L 21–49	1,806
September 23	1:00 p.m.	at Valparaiso	Brown Field; Valparaiso, IN	ESPN+	W 36–30 ^{OT}	3,331
September 30	1:00 p.m.	Stetson	Leonidoff Field; Poughkeepsie, NY	ESPN+	W 34–24	4,287
October 7	12:30 p.m.	at Columbia*	Robert K. Kraft Field at Lawrence A. Wien Stadium; New York, NY	ESPN+	L 0–16	2,873
October 14	12:00 p.m.	San Diego	Leonidoff Field; Poughkeepsie, NY		W 30–16	1,243
October 21	1:00 p.m.	at Presbyterian	Bailey Memorial Stadium; Clinton, SC	ESPN+	W 19–10	1,921
October 28	2:00 p.m.	at St. Thomas (MN)	O'Shaughnessy Stadium; Saint Paul, MN	ESPN+	L 14–49	2,917
November 4	12:00 p.m.	Drake^{†}	Leonidoff Field; Poughkeepsie, NY	ESPN+	L 3–10	1,594
November 11	1:00 p.m.	at Dayton	Welcome Stadium; Dayton, OH	ESPN+	L 6–35	5,153
November 18	12:00 p.m.	Bucknell*	Leonidoff Field; Poughkeepsie, NY	ESPN+	L 21–38	1,552
*Non-conference game; ^{†}Homecoming; All times are in Eastern time
