= 2023 St. Thomas Tommies football team =

American college football season

2023 St. Thomas Tommies football
- Conference: Pioneer Football League
- Record: 8–3 (7–1 PFL)
- Head coach: Glenn Caruso (15th season)
- Offensive coordinator: Jake Landry (2nd season)
- Defensive coordinator: Wallie Kuchinski (15th season)
- Home stadium: O'Shaughnessy Stadium

2023 Pioneer Football League standings
	Conf.			Overall
Team	W		L	W		L
Drake $^	8	–	0	8	–	4
St. Thomas (MN) *	7	–	1	8	–	3
Davidson	6	–	2	7	–	4
Butler	5	–	3	7	–	4
Marist	4	–	4	4	–	7
San Diego	4	–	4	4	–	7
Morehead State	3	–	5	4	–	7
Presbyterian	2	–	6	4	–	7
Valparaiso	2	–	6	3	–	8
Dayton	2	–	6	4	–	7
Stetson	1	–	7	3	–	8
$ – Conference champion; ^ – FCS playoff participant; * – St. Thomas (MN) ineligible for FCS postseason play due to transition from NCAA Division III; Rankings from STATS Poll

The 2023 St. Thomas Tommies football team represented the University of St. Thomas in Saint Paul, Minnesota as a member of the Pioneer Football League (PFL) during the 2023 NCAA Division I FCS football season. Led by 15th-year head coach Glenn Caruso, the Tommies played home games at O'Shaughnessy Stadium in Saint Paul, Minnesota.

== Schedule ==
Date	Time	Opponent	Site	TV	Result	Attendance
September 2	1:00 p.m.	Black Hills State*	O'Shaughnessy Stadium; Saint Paul, MN	MidcoSN Plus	W 36–26	3,793
September 9	1:00 p.m.	at South Dakota*	DakotaDome; Vermillion, SD	MidcoSN	L 0–24	6,126
September 16	12:00 p.m.	at Harvard*	Harvard Stadium; Boston, MA	ESPN+	L 13–45	6,217
September 23	1:00 p.m.	Morehead State	O'Shaughnessy Stadium; Saint Paul, MN	FOX 9+, MidcoSN Plus	W 35–28	4,466
September 30	12:00 p.m.	at Dayton	Welcome Stadium; Dayton, OH	ESPN+	W 20–14	6,361
October 7	12:00 p.m.	Butler^{†}	O'Shaughnessy Stadium; Saint Paul, MN	FOX 9+, MidcoSN Plus	W 17–10	4,855
October 14	12:00 p.m.	at Drake	Drake Stadium; Des Moines, IA	ESPN+	L 21–52	1,902
October 21	12:00 p.m.	at Stetson	Spec Martin Stadium; DeLand, FL	ESPN+	W 38–6	1,876
October 28	1:00 p.m.	Marist	O'Shaughnessy Stadium; Saint Paul, MN	FOX 9+, MidcoSN Plus	W 49–14	2,917
November 11	3:00 p.m.	at San Diego	Torero Stadium; San Diego, CA	ESPN+	W 20–14 ^{OT}	1,703
November 18	1:00 p.m.	Valparaiso	O'Shaughnessy Stadium; Saint Paul, MN	FOX 9+, MidcoSN Plus	W 16–10	3,310
*Non-conference game; ^{†}Homecoming; All times are in Central time
