= 2023 San Diego Toreros football team =

American college football season

2023 San Diego Toreros football
- Conference: Pioneer Football League
- Record: 4–7 (4–4 PFL)
- Head coach: Brandon Moore (1st season)
- Offensive coordinator: Corey White (2nd season)
- Defensive coordinator: Bobby Jay (6th season)
- Co-defensive coordinator: Mike McGlinchey Jr. (1st season)
- Home stadium: Torero Stadium

2023 Pioneer Football League standings
	Conf.			Overall
Team	W		L	W		L
Drake $^	8	–	0	8	–	4
St. Thomas (MN) *	7	–	1	8	–	3
Davidson	6	–	2	7	–	4
Butler	5	–	3	7	–	4
Marist	4	–	4	4	–	7
San Diego	4	–	4	4	–	7
Morehead State	3	–	5	4	–	7
Presbyterian	2	–	6	4	–	7
Valparaiso	2	–	6	3	–	8
Dayton	2	–	6	4	–	7
Stetson	1	–	7	3	–	8
$ – Conference champion; ^ – FCS playoff participant; * – St. Thomas (MN) ineligible for FCS postseason play due to transition from NCAA Division III; Rankings from STATS Poll

The 2023 San Diego Toreros football team represented the University of San Diego as a member of the Pioneer Football League (PFL) during the 2023 NCAA Division I FCS football season. Led by first-year head coach Brandon Moore, the Toreros compiled an overall record of 4–7 with a mark of 4–4 conference play, tying for fifth place in the PFL. The team played home games at Torero Stadium in San Diego.

== Schedule ==
Date	Time	Opponent	Site	TV	Result	Attendance
September 2	3:00 p.m.	at Cal Poly*	Alex G. Spanos Stadium; San Luis Obispo, CA	ESPN+	L 10–27	6,248
September 9	1:00 p.m.	Colorado Mesa*	Torero Stadium; San Diego, CA	ESPN+	L 21–28 ^{OT}	858
September 16	1:00 p.m.	Princeton*	Torero Stadium; San Diego, CA	ESPN+	L 12–23	1,791
September 23	2:00 p.m.	Dayton	Torero Stadium; San Diego, CA	ESPN+	W 40–25	934
September 30	9:00 a.m.	at Davidson	Richardson Stadium; Davidson, NC	ESPN+	L 33–55	4,021
October 14	9:00 a.m.	at Marist	Leonidoff Field; Poughkeepsie, NY	ESPN+	L 16–30	1,243
October 21	2:00 p.m.	Drake	Torero Stadium; San Diego, CA	ESPN+	L 20–25	791
October 28	2:00 p.m.	Morehead State^{†}	Torero Stadium; San Diego, CA	ESPN+	W 17–11	1,593
November 4	10:00 a.m.	at Presbyterian	Bailey Memorial Stadium; Clinton, SC	ESPN+	W 23–13	675
November 11	1:00 p.m.	St. Thomas	Torero Stadium; San Diego, CA	ESPN+	L 14–20 ^{OT}	1,703
November 18	9:00 a.m.	at Stetson	Spec Martin Stadium; DeLand, FL	ESPN+	W 47–20	1,260
*Non-conference game; ^{†}Homecoming; All times are in Pacific time

== Game summaries ==
	1	2	3	4	Total
Toreros	3	0	7	0	10
Mustangs	10	7	3	7	27
