= 2023 Davidson Wildcats football team =

American college football season

2023 Davidson Wildcats football
- Conference: Pioneer Football League
- Record: 7–4 (6–2 PFL)
- Head coach: Scott Abell (6th season)
- Defensive coordinator: Jon Berlin (6th season)
- Home stadium: Richardson Stadium

2023 Pioneer Football League standings
	Conf.			Overall
Team	W		L	W		L
Drake $^	8	–	0	8	–	4
St. Thomas (MN) *	7	–	1	8	–	3
Davidson	6	–	2	7	–	4
Butler	5	–	3	7	–	4
Marist	4	–	4	4	–	7
San Diego	4	–	4	4	–	7
Morehead State	3	–	5	4	–	7
Presbyterian	2	–	6	4	–	7
Valparaiso	2	–	6	3	–	8
Dayton	2	–	6	4	–	7
Stetson	1	–	7	3	–	8
$ – Conference champion; ^ – FCS playoff participant; * – St. Thomas (MN) ineligible for FCS postseason play due to transition from NCAA Division III; Rankings from STATS Poll

The 2023 Davidson Wildcats football team represented Davidson College as a member of the Pioneer Football League (PFL) during the 2023 NCAA Division I FCS football season. They were led by sixth-year head coach Scott Abell and played home games at Richardson Stadium in Davidson, North Carolina.

== Schedule ==
Date	Time	Opponent	Site	TV	Result	Attendance
September 2	1:30 p.m.	at VMI*	Alumni Memorial Field; Lexington, VA	ESPN+	L 7–12	5,622
September 8	7:00 p.m.	Barton*	Richardson Stadium; Davidson, NC		L 31–33	3,105
September 16	1:00 p.m.	at Marist	Leonidoff Field; Poughkeepsie, NY	ESPN+	W 49–21	1,806
September 23	7:00 p.m.	St. Andrews*	Richardson Stadium; Davidson, NC		W 84–6	4,357
September 30	12:00 p.m.	San Diego	Richardson Stadium; Davidson, NC	ESPN+	W 55–33	4,021
October 14	1:00 p.m.	at Butler	Bud and Jackie Sellick Bowl; Indianapolis, IN	ESPN+	W 35–33	1,873
October 21	1:00 p.m.	Valparaiso	Richardson Stadium; Davidson, NC	ESPN+	W 42–21	4,991
October 28	7:00 p.m.	Presbyterian	Richardson Stadium; Davidson, NC	ESPN+	W 45–28	4,119
November 4	1:00 p.m.	at Stetson	Spec Martin Stadium; DeLand, FL	ESPN+	W 61–41	1,351
November 11	1:00 p.m.	at Morehead State	Jayne Stadium; Morehead, KY	ESPN+	L 17–47	5,675
November 18	7:00 p.m.	Dayton	Richardson Stadium; Davidson, NC	ESPN+	L 14–45	4,402
*Non-conference game; All times are in Eastern time
