= 2023 Drake Bulldogs football team =

American college football season

2023 Drake Bulldogs football

PFL champion

NCAA Division I First Round, L 3–66 at North Dakota State
- Conference: Pioneer Football League
- Record: 8–4 (8–0 PFL)
- Head coach: Todd Stepsis (5th season)
- Defensive coordinator: Allen Smith (5th season)
- Home stadium: Drake Stadium

2023 Pioneer Football League standings
	Conf.			Overall
Team	W		L	W		L
Drake $^	8	–	0	8	–	4
St. Thomas (MN) *	7	–	1	8	–	3
Davidson	6	–	2	7	–	4
Butler	5	–	3	7	–	4
Marist	4	–	4	4	–	7
San Diego	4	–	4	4	–	7
Morehead State	3	–	5	4	–	7
Presbyterian	2	–	6	4	–	7
Valparaiso	2	–	6	3	–	8
Dayton	2	–	6	4	–	7
Stetson	1	–	7	3	–	8
$ – Conference champion; ^ – FCS playoff participant; * – St. Thomas (MN) ineligible for FCS postseason play due to transition from NCAA Division III; Rankings from STATS Poll

The 2023 Drake Bulldogs football team represented Drake University as a member of the Pioneer Football League (PFL) during the 2023 NCAA Division I FCS football season. The Bulldogs were led by fifth-year head coach Todd Stepsis and played home games at Drake Stadium in Des Moines, Iowa.

== Schedule ==
Date	Time	Opponent	Site	TV	Result	Attendance
September 2	3:00 p.m.	at No. 17 North Dakota*	Alerus Center; Grand Forks, ND	ESPN+	L 7–55	8,503
September 9	6:00 p.m.	No. 1 (NAIA) Northwestern (IA)*	Drake Stadium; Des Moines, IA	ESPN+	L 24–27 ^{OT}	3,526
September 16	2:30 p.m.	vs. No. 1 South Dakota State*	Target Field; Minneapolis, MN	ESPN+	L 7–70	18,174
September 30	1:00 p.m.	at Morehead State	Jayne Stadium; Morehead, KY	ESPN+	W 16–9	6,876
October 7	1:00 p.m.	Valparaiso	Drake Stadium; Des Moines, IA	ESPN+	W 20–14	3,075
October 14	12:00 p.m.	St. Thomas (MN)	Drake Stadium; Des Moines, IA	ESPN+	W 52–21	1,902
October 21	4:00 p.m.	at San Diego	Torero Stadium; San Diego, CA	ESPN+	W 25–20	791
October 28	12:00 p.m.	Stetson	Drake Stadium; Des Moines, IA	ESPN+	W 33–7	1,625
November 4	11:00 a.m.	at Marist	Leonidoff Field; Poughkeepsie, NY	ESPN+	W 10–3	1,594
November 11	1:00 p.m.	Presbyterian	Drake Stadium; Des Moines, IA	ESPN+	W 16–14	2,278
November 18	11:00 a.m.	at Butler	Bud and Jackie Sellick Bowl; Indianapolis, IN	FloSports	W 13–9	2,788
November 25	2:30 p.m.	at No. 8 North Dakota State*	Fargodome; Fargo, ND (NCAA Division I First Round)	ESPN+	L 3–66	7,798
*Non-conference game; Rankings from STATS Poll released prior to the game; All times are in Central time

== Game summaries ==
=== At No. 17 North Dakota ===
	1	2	3	4	Total
Bulldogs	0	0	0	7	7
No. 17 Fighting Hawks	0	14	27	14	55

=== Northwestern (IA) ===
	1	2	3	4	OT	Total
Red Raiders	3	7	3	8	6	27
Bulldogs	0	14	0	7	3	24

=== vs. No. 1 South Dakota State ===
	1	2	3	4	Total
Bulldogs	7	0	0	0	7
No. 1 Jackrabbits	14	21	21	14	70

=== At Morehead State ===
	1	2	3	4	Total
Bulldogs	7	6	0	3	16
Eagles	0	6	3	0	9

=== Valparaiso ===
	1	2	3	4	Total
Beacons	0	0	0	14	14
Bulldogs	7	3	7	3	20

=== St. Thomas ===
	1	2	3	4	Total
Tommies	7	14	0	0	21
Bulldogs	7	17	21	7	52

=== at San Diego ===
	1	2	3	4	Total
Bulldogs	3	6	10	6	25
Torreros	0	7	3	10	20

=== Stetson ===
	1	2	3	4	Total
Hatters	0	7	0	0	7
Bulldogs	3	10	7	13	33

=== at Marist ===
	1	2	3	4	Total
Bulldogs	0	7	0	3	10
Red Foxes	0	0	3	0	3

=== Presbyterian ===
	1	2	3	4	Total
Blue Hose	7	0	0	7	14
Bulldogs	7	3	6	0	16

=== at Butler ===
	1	2	3	4	Total
DU Bulldogs	0	7	0	6	13
BU Bulldogs	3	0	6	0	9

=== at No. 8 North Dakota State (NCAA Division I playoff–first round) ===
No. 8 North Dakota State Bison (8–3) vs. Drake Bulldogs (8–3)

Quarter	1	2	3	4	Total
Bulldogs	3	0	0	0	3
No. 8 Bison	14	21	10	21	66

at Fargodome, Fargo, ND

- Date: November 25, 2023
- Game time: 2:30 p.m. (CT)
- Game weather: Indoors; 70 °F (21 °C)
- Game attendance: 7,798
- Referee: Brad Carrell
- TV announcers (ESPN+): Noah Reed (play-by-play) and Charles Arbuckle (analyst)

Statistics	Drake	North Dakota State
First downs	12	27
Plays–yards	56–177	64–547
Rushes–yards	31–61	51–318
Passing yards	116	229
Passing: comp–att–int	14–25–2	12–13–0
Time of possession	26:24	33:36

Team	Category	Player	Statistics
Drake	Passing	Luke Bailey	13/24, 111 yds, 2 INT
Drake	Rushing	Dorian Boyland	9 car, 67 yds
Drake	Receiving	Trey Radocha	4 rec, 41 yds
North Dakota State	Passing	Cam Miller	10/11, 206 yds, 2 TD
North Dakota State	Rushing	Cole Payton	13 car, 104 yds, 2 TD
North Dakota State	Receiving	Eli Green	3 rec, 91 yds, TD

Scoring summary

Quarter	Time	Drive			Team	Scoring information	Score	
Quarter	Time	Plays	Yards	TOP	Team	Scoring information	DRAKE	NDSU
1st	12:34	6	37	2:18	DRAKE	30-yard field goal by Shane Dunning (#89)	3	0
1st	10:10	5	65	2:24	NDSU	Cole Payton (#9) 20-yard touchdown run, Griffin Crosa (#39) kick good	3	7
1st	3:40	5	25	2:19	NDSU	RaJa Nelson (#3) 5-yard touchdown run, Griffin Crosa (#39) kick good	3	14
2nd	14:08	4	77	1:58	NDSU	RaJa Nelson (#3) 40-yard touchdown reception from Cam Miller (#7), Griffin Crosa (#39) kick good	3	21
2nd	4:10	12	90	7:11	NDSU	TaMerik Williams (#22) 4-yard touchdown run, Griffin Crosa (#39) kick good	3	28
2nd	0:17	4	80	0:34	NDSU	Eli Green (#13) 34-yard touchdown reception from Cam Miller (#7), Griffin Crosa (#39) kick good	3	35
3rd	9:57	8	26	4:11	NDSU	31-yard field goal by Griffin Crosa (#39)	3	38
3rd	4:30	7	48	4:14	NDSU	Barika Kpeenu (#8) 14-yard touchdown run, Griffin Crosa (#39) kick good	3	45
4th	9:54	9	63	5:45	NDSU	Barika Kpeenu (#8) 1-yard touchdown run, Griffin Crosa (#39) kick good	3	52
4th	5:00	6	64	3:12	NDSU	Cole Payton (#9) 36-yard touchdown run, Griffin Crosa (#39) kick good	3	59
4th	3:32				NDSU	Fumble recovery returned 5 yards for touchdown by Kelton McCaslin (#92), Griffin Crosa (#39) kick good	3	66
"TOP" = time of possession. For other American football terms, see Glossary of American football.							3	66
