= 2023 Stetson Hatters football team =

American college football season

2023 Stetson Hatters football
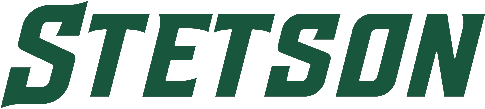
- Conference: Pioneer Football League
- Record: 3–8 (1–7 PFL)
- Head coach: Brian Young (3rd season)
- Offensive coordinator: Norman Joseph (1st season)
- Home stadium: Spec Martin Stadium

2023 Pioneer Football League standings
	Conf.			Overall
Team	W		L	W		L
Drake $^	8	–	0	8	–	4
St. Thomas (MN) *	7	–	1	8	–	3
Davidson	6	–	2	7	–	4
Butler	5	–	3	7	–	4
Marist	4	–	4	4	–	7
San Diego	4	–	4	4	–	7
Morehead State	3	–	5	4	–	7
Presbyterian	2	–	6	4	–	7
Valparaiso	2	–	6	3	–	8
Dayton	2	–	6	4	–	7
Stetson	1	–	7	3	–	8
$ – Conference champion; ^ – FCS playoff participant; * – St. Thomas (MN) ineligible for FCS postseason play due to transition from NCAA Division III; Rankings from STATS Poll

The 2023 Stetson Hatters football team represented Stetson University as a member of the Pioneer Football League (PFL) during the 2023 NCAA Division I FCS football season. Led by third-year head coach Brian Young, the Hatters compiled an overall record of 3–8 with a mark of 1–7 in conference play, placing last out of 11 teams in the PFL. Stetson played home games at Spec Martin Stadium in DeLand, Florida.

== Schedule ==
Date	Time	Opponent	Site	TV	Result	Attendance
September 2	6:00 p.m.	St. Thomas (FL)*	Spec Martin Stadium; DeLand, FL	ESPN+	W 34–33	1,609
September 9	7:00 p.m.	Webber International*	Spec Martin Stadium; DeLand, FL	ESPN+	W 38–28	1,430
September 16	3:00 p.m.	at No. 3 Montana State*	Bobcat Stadium; Bozeman, MT	ESPN+	L 20–57	21,487
September 23	12:00 p.m.	Butler	Spec Martin Stadium; DeLand, FL	ESPN+	L 18–28	1,128
September 30	1:00 p.m.	at Marist	Leonidoff Field; Poughkeepsie, NY	ESPN+	L 24–34	4,287
October 7	1:00 p.m.	at Presbyterian	Bailey Memorial Stadium; Clinton, SC	ESPN+	W 28–24	1,202
October 21	1:00 p.m.	St. Thomas (MN)^{†}	Spec Martin Stadium; DeLand, FL	ESPN+	L 6–38	1,876
October 28	1:00 p.m.	at Drake	Drake Stadium; Des Moines, IA	ESPN+	L 7–33	1,625
November 4	1:00 p.m.	Davidson	Spec Martin Stadium; DeLand, FL	ESPN+	L 41–61	1,351
November 11	1:00 p.m.	at Valparaiso	Brown Field; Valparaiso, IN	ESPN+	L 20–23 ^{OT}	1,056
November 18	12:00 p.m.	San Diego	Spec Martin Stadium; DeLand, FL	ESPN+	L 20–47	1,260
*Non-conference game; ^{†}Homecoming; Rankings from STATS Poll released prior to the game; All times are in Eastern time
