= St. Cloud State University =

Public university in St. Cloud, Minnesota, US

- Former names: Third State Normal School (1869–1873); State Normal School at St. Cloud (1873-1921); St. Cloud State Teachers College (1921–1957); St. Cloud State College (1957–1975)
- Type: Public university
- Established: 1869
- Parent institution: Minnesota State system
- President: Gregory Tomso
- Faculty: 331 full-time, 168 part-time (fall 2023)
- Students: 10,164 (fall 2024)
- Undergraduates: 8,209 (fall 2024)
- Postgraduates: 1,955 (fall 2024)
- Location: St. Cloud, Minnesota, United States; 45°33′0″N 94°9′0″W
- Campus: Urban 100 acres (40 ha) campus
- Colors: Spirit red, Black and White
- Nickname: Huskies
- Sporting affiliations: NCAA Division II – NSIC; NCAA Division I - NCHC; NCAA Division I - WCHA
- Mascot: Blizzard T. Husky
- Website: stcloudstate.edu

St. Cloud State University (SCSU) is a public university in St. Cloud, Minnesota, United States. Founded in 1869, the university is one of the largest institutions in the Minnesota State Colleges and Universities system. In the fall of 2023, it enrolled 8,430 undergraduate and 2,084 graduate students.

== History ==
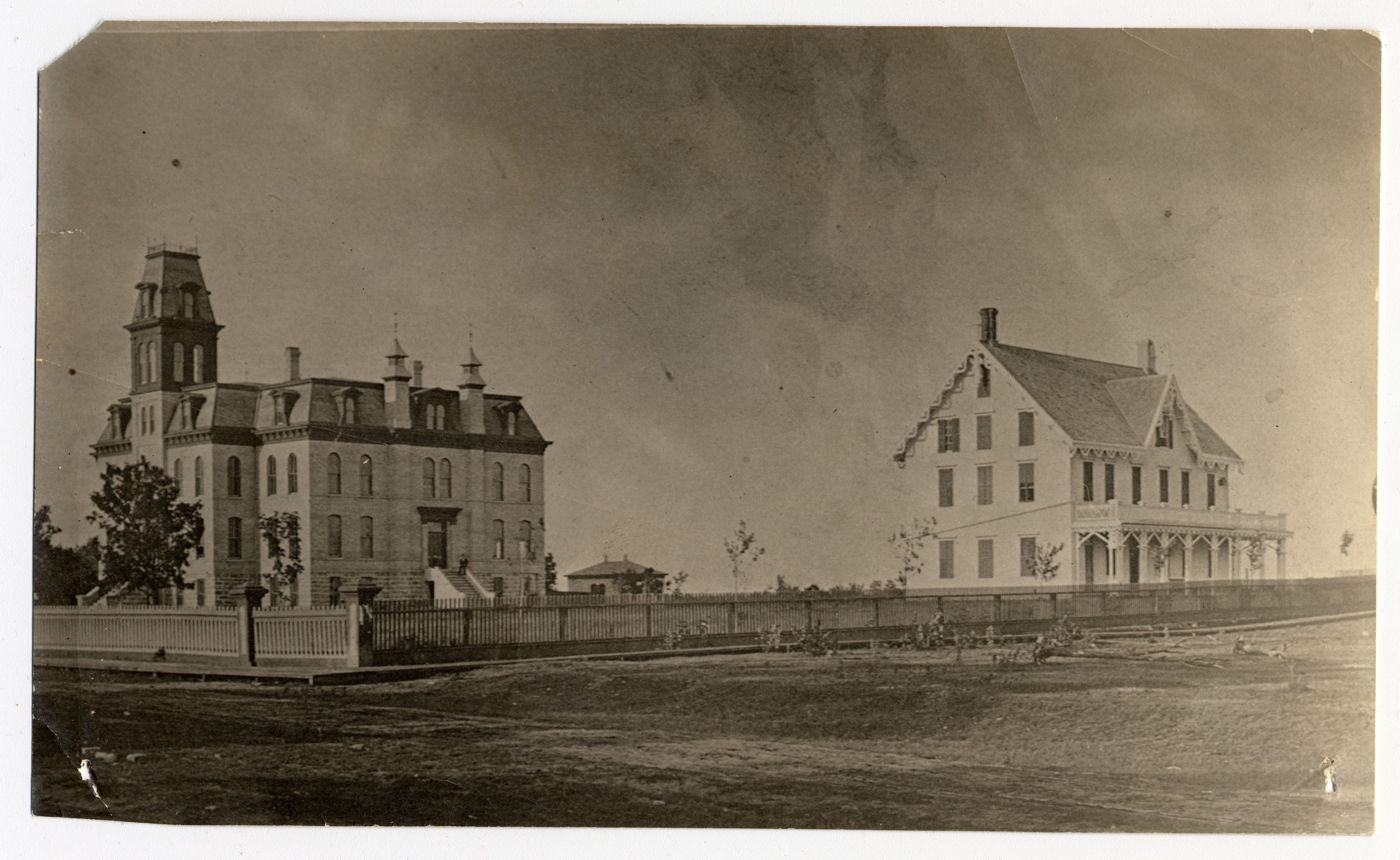
Old Main Building and Stearns House, St. Cloud State University, 1874

St. Cloud State was founded in 1869 as the Third State Normal School. At the time, the school consisted of just one building, the Stearns House, a former renovated hotel purchased by the state Legislature for $3,000. The faculty included five members, led by Principal Ira Moore. Of the first 50 students, 40 were women. As more women enrolled and the Old Main building opened in early 1874, the Stearns House was fully converted into a women’s dormitory later that year. Male students later formed a boarding club and found a house near campus, which was supervised by a matron.

In 1898, the school offered a junior college curriculum. In 1914, the school dropped its secondary education program. The Legislature authorized a name change in 1921 to St. Cloud State Teachers College. In 1957, the word "Teachers" was dropped. The first bachelor's degrees were awarded in 1925. In 1975, St. Cloud State became a university comprising five colleges and a graduate school. Applied doctoral degrees were first offered in 2007.

Enrollment at St. Cloud State dropped from roughly 18,000 in 2010 to roughly 10,000 in 2024. Of these, only about 5,000 were traditional full-time students, the rest being part-time students, including about 2,500 students under 18 enrolled in PSEO courses. This steep decline led to financial problems including a net loss of $18 million in 2023 and a budget deficit of $14.4 million in 2024. This led the university to make severe budget cuts, including cutting 42 degree programs, 50 minors, 54 full-time faculty, 42 staff, four administrative positions, eliminating football, and heavily scaling back student events like homecoming. About 52% of the College of Education and Learning Design and 42% of the College of Liberal Arts programs were eliminated as part of this effort. To help slow the enrollment decline and increase revenue, the university signed a contract with Academic Partnerships to increase its online course offerings for nontraditional students. It also plans to remove numerous unused buildings and structures to decrease management costs.

=== Previous school names ===
- Third State Normal School 1869–1873
- State Normal School at St. Cloud 1873–1921
- St. Cloud State Teachers College 1921–1957
- St. Cloud State College 1957–1975
- St. Cloud State University 1975–present

== Academics ==
Academic rankings

Regional
- U.S. News & World Report: 86

National
- Forbes: 583

The university offers over 200 majors, minors, and pre-professional programs in six colleges and schools.

SCSU is the only Minnesota university that offers an Accreditation Board for Engineering and Technology (ABET) accredited manufacturing engineering program. It also provides ABET-accredited electrical engineering, mechanical engineering, and computer science programs.

The School of Graduate Studies offers more than 60 graduate programs and certificates, including specialist, Master of Arts, Master of Business Administration, Master of Engineering Management, Master of Music and Master of Science. Ed.D. doctoral degrees are offered in Higher Education Administration and Educational Administration and Leadership.

=== Colleges and schools ===
St. Cloud State offers more than 200 undergraduate programs, more than 60 graduate programs, and three doctoral programs of study in seven colleges and schools.

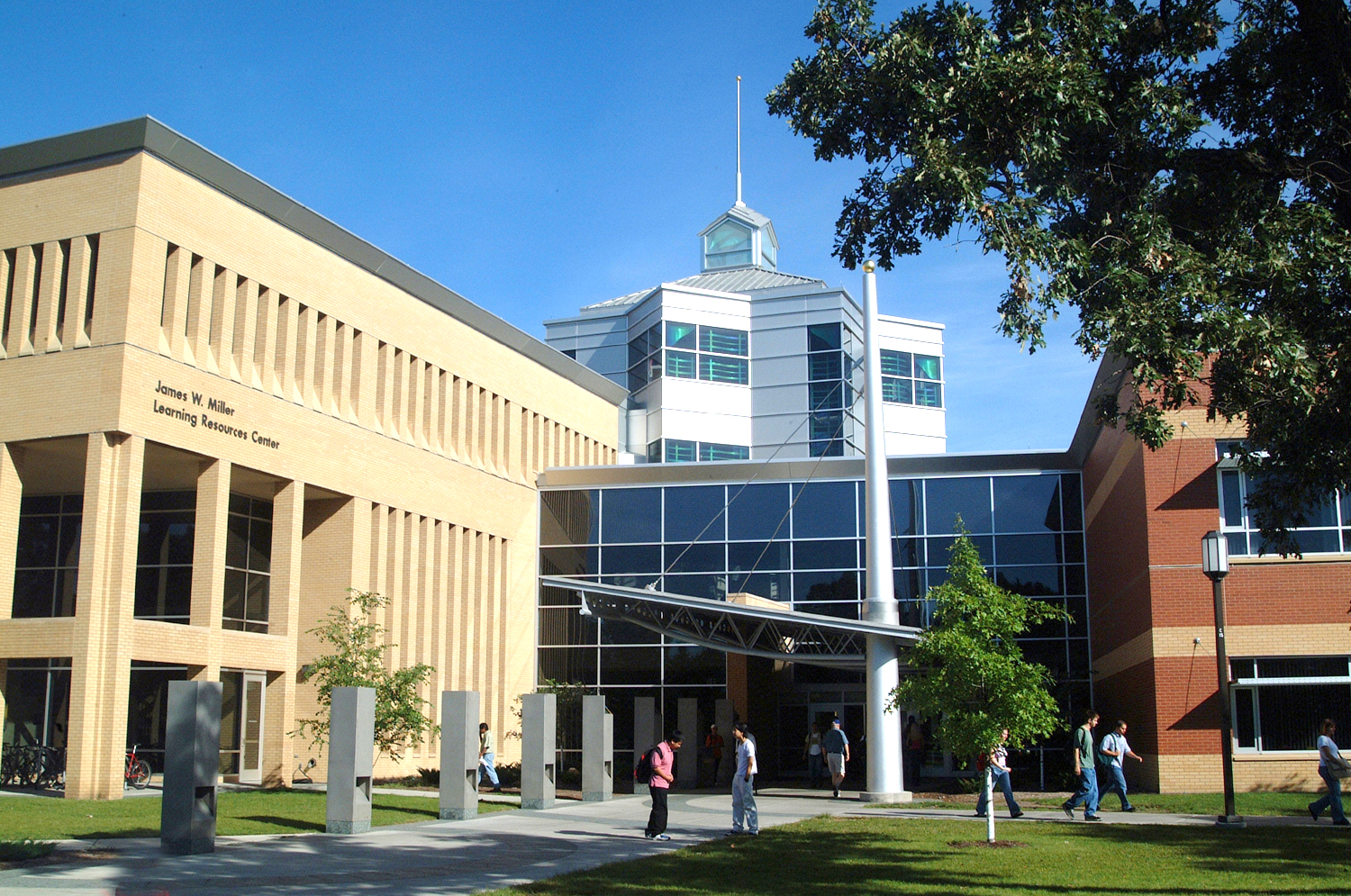
The Miller Center delivers library and information technology services.

- College of Science and Engineering
- College of Liberal Arts
- College of Education and Learning Design, CAEP-accredited
- College of Health and Wellness Professions
- Herberger Business School, AACSB-accredited
- School of Computing, Engineering, and Environment
- School of Arts

=== Student organizations ===
Undergraduate demographics as of Fall 2023
Race and ethnicity	Total
White	61%
Black	13%
International student	12%
Hispanic	6%
Asian	4%
Two or more races	4%
Unknown	1%
Economic diversity
Low-income (Note: The percentage of students who received an income-based federal Pell grant intended for low-income students.)	33%
Affluent (Note: The percentage of students who are a part of the American middle class at the bare minimum.)	67%

At the start of each academic year, students are invited to "Mainstreet," a showcase for student organizations, campus services, and community connections. Students are encouraged to participate in its more than 250 student organizations, including the Investment Club, which runs a student-managed investment portfolio.

There are roughly ten Greek houses.

=== Student media ===
KVSC 88.1 FM is an educational public radio station licensed to SCSU. The station started on May 10, 1967, and expanded broadcasting times in September 1994. Among other things, KVSC hosts a 50-hour trivia contest, which dates to 1980, and community events, such as Granite City Radio Theatre.

UTVS is the school's broadcast television station, airing student-produced content on Charter Channel 180 24/7.

Students pay a $0.61 per credit fee to fund Students United, a student-led nonprofit advocacy organization for Minnesota State Colleges and Universities System students.

== Athletics ==
SCSU has 19 NCAA Division II teams and is a member of the Northern Sun Intercollegiate Conference. The team name is the Huskies, and it is represented by Blizzard, the mascot.

In 2014, the university updated its secondary logo, which features a Husky dog face. In 2019, SCSU announced it was discontinuing the men's football team and men's and women's golf. To remain in compliance with Title IX, the university is adding a men's soccer team.

=== Ice hockey ===
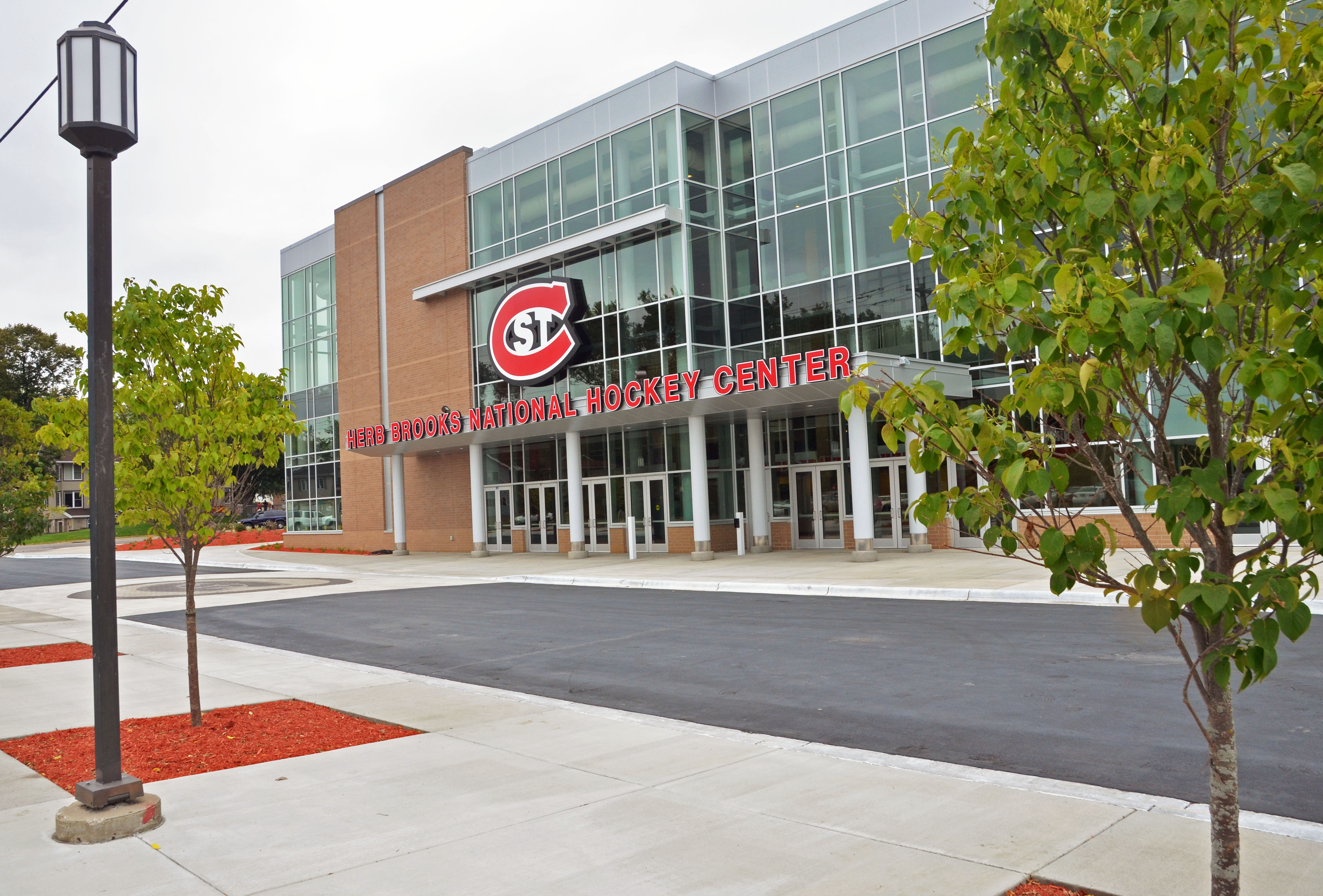
Herb Brooks National Hockey Center at One Herb Brooks Plaza

Men's and women's ice hockey teams compete in NCAA Division I. Men's Hockey is in the NCHC, and Women's Hockey is in the WCHA.

In the 1986–87 season, Herb Brooks, the 1980 USA men's Olympic hockey coach, became the coach of the Huskies and helped men's hockey attain NCAA Division I status. That season, he led the Huskies to a 25–10–1 record and a third-place trophy at the NCAA Division III Men's Ice Hockey Championship. He also guided efforts to build the two-rink arena, Herb Brooks National Hockey Center, that now bears his name. In 2001, the men's team won the WCHA post-season tournament, symbolized by the Broadmoor Trophy.

In 1998, the university added a women's hockey team at the NCAA Division I level.

Men's Huskies Hockey has earned 19 NCAA Men's Ice Hockey Championship appearances. The team advanced to the 2013 Frozen Four. The 2012–13 team's co-captain Drew LeBlanc was named WCHA Player of the Year and earned numerous national honors, including the Hobey Baker Award, the most prestigious award in men's college hockey. The 2013 team also earned a share of the WCHA league title and the MacNaughton Cup. The 2014 team earned the Penrose Cup, the league title trophy for the inaugural season of the NCHC. In 2016 the team won the NCHC post-season tournament, the Frozen Faceoff. In 2018, the team won the NCHC regular-season title, the Penrose Cup, with a 16-4-4 record.

=== Wrestling ===
Huskies Wrestling won the NCAA Wrestling Championship in 2020, 2019, 2018, 2016 and 2015 and placed second in 2017, 2013, 2012, and 2011.

=== Basketball ===
From 1982–90, Women's Huskies Basketball dominated the North Central Conference, compiling a 179-58 record in that timespan and advancing three times to the NCAA Women's Division II Basketball Tournament quarterfinals. SCSU won the NSIC Championship in 2020, winning the title for the second time in program history and the first time since 2009.

Men's Huskies basketball, created in 1901, made 10 NCAA Men's Division II Basketball Tournament appearances. The Huskies advanced to a 2010 semifinal, losing 76–70 to Indiana University of Pennsylvania. They finished 29–6 that season.
