= Dave Marquis =

American football coach

Current position
- Title: Head coach
- Team: Otterbein
- Conference: OAC
- Record: 1–9

Biographical details
- Born: Bridgeville, Pennsylvania, U.S.
- Education: Kent State University (2006, 2010)

Coaching career (HC unless noted)
- 2003–2005: Kent State (SA)
- 2006–2007: Randolph–Macon (TE)
- 2008–2010: Kent State (GA)
- 2011–2012: Dayton (DE)
- 2013–2014: Randolph–Macon (ST/LB)
- 2015: Wittenberg (ST/LB)
- 2016: Wittenberg (DC)
- 2017–2018: Dayton (LB/RC)
- 2019–2022: Wittenberg (DC)
- 2023: Valparaiso (co-DC/DB)
- 2024: Valparaiso (DC/LB)
- 2025–present: Otterbein

Head coaching record
- Overall: 1–9

David Marquis is an American college football coach. He is the head football coach for Otterbein University, a position he has held since 2025. He also coached for Kent State, Randolph–Macon, Dayton, Wittenberg, and Valparaiso.

== Head coaching record ==
Year	Team	Overall	Conference	Standing	Bowl/playoffs
Otterbein Cardinals (Ohio Athletic Conference) (2025–present)
2025	Otterbein	1–9	1–7	T–7th	
2026	Otterbein	0–0	0–0		
Otterbein:		1–9	1–7		
Total:		1–9			
