= Culinology =

Culinology, according to Jeff Cousminer in Food Product Design Magazine, is a term that was coined by the first president and founder of the Research Chefs Association, Winston Riley. The original meaning of the word was quite different from what it has come to mean today. Originally, the word was designed to be a combination of two words: "culinary" and "technology". So the first meaning of the word was the convergence of culinary arts and all technology, which includes communications, chemistry, physiology, economics and many others.

There are accredited culinology educational programs offered by many institutions. The curriculums of such courses combine the disciplines of cooking and food science. According to industry professionals, such as Harry Crane, culinology should "help jump-start product development."

Culinologists work in diverse aspects of food—from experimental chefs and menu planners to food manufacturing to fine dining. The word is protected by the professional association, the Research Chefs Association, which owns the registered trademark.

== See also ==
- Molecular gastronomy
