= Southwest Minnesota State University =

Public university in Marshall, Minnesota, US

- Former names: Southwest Minnesota State College (1964–1975); Southwest State University (1975–2003)
- Motto: Discover. Engage. Lead.
- Type: Public university
- Established: 1964; 62 years ago
- Parent institution: Minnesota State system
- Academic affiliations: Space-grant
- Budget: $57 million (2019)
- President: David P. Jones
- Faculty: 148
- Students: 8,718
- Location: Marshall, Minnesota, United States; 44°27′16″N 95°45′34″W
- Campus: Small city (rural), 216 acres (87 ha)
- Colors: Brown and gold
- Nickname: Mustangs
- Sporting affiliations: NCAA Division II – NSIC
- Website: smsu.edu

Southwest Minnesota State University (SMSU) is a public university in Marshall, Minnesota, United States. It is part of the Minnesota State Colleges and Universities system. The university has an enrollment of approximately 8,700 students and employs 148 faculty members. It is divided into two major colleges, the College of Arts, Letters, and Sciences and the College of Business, Education, and Professional Studies.

== History ==
The university was founded in 1964 as "Southwest Minnesota State College" (SMSC). It admitted its first class of students on September 19, 1967. The college became "Southwest State University" (SSU) on August 1, 1975, and kept that name for nearly 30 years until adopting the name Southwest Minnesota State University (SMSU) on July 1, 2003.

The first issue of the student newspaper, originally called The Impact, was published on May 10, 1968. The name was changed to The Reader in 1974 and back to The Impact in 1980. In 2003 the name was changed to The Spur to be more consistent with the Mustang theme and to spur students into action.

The R/A (Recreation/Athletic) Facility was built in 1996 and is a 4,000-seat multi-purpose venue.

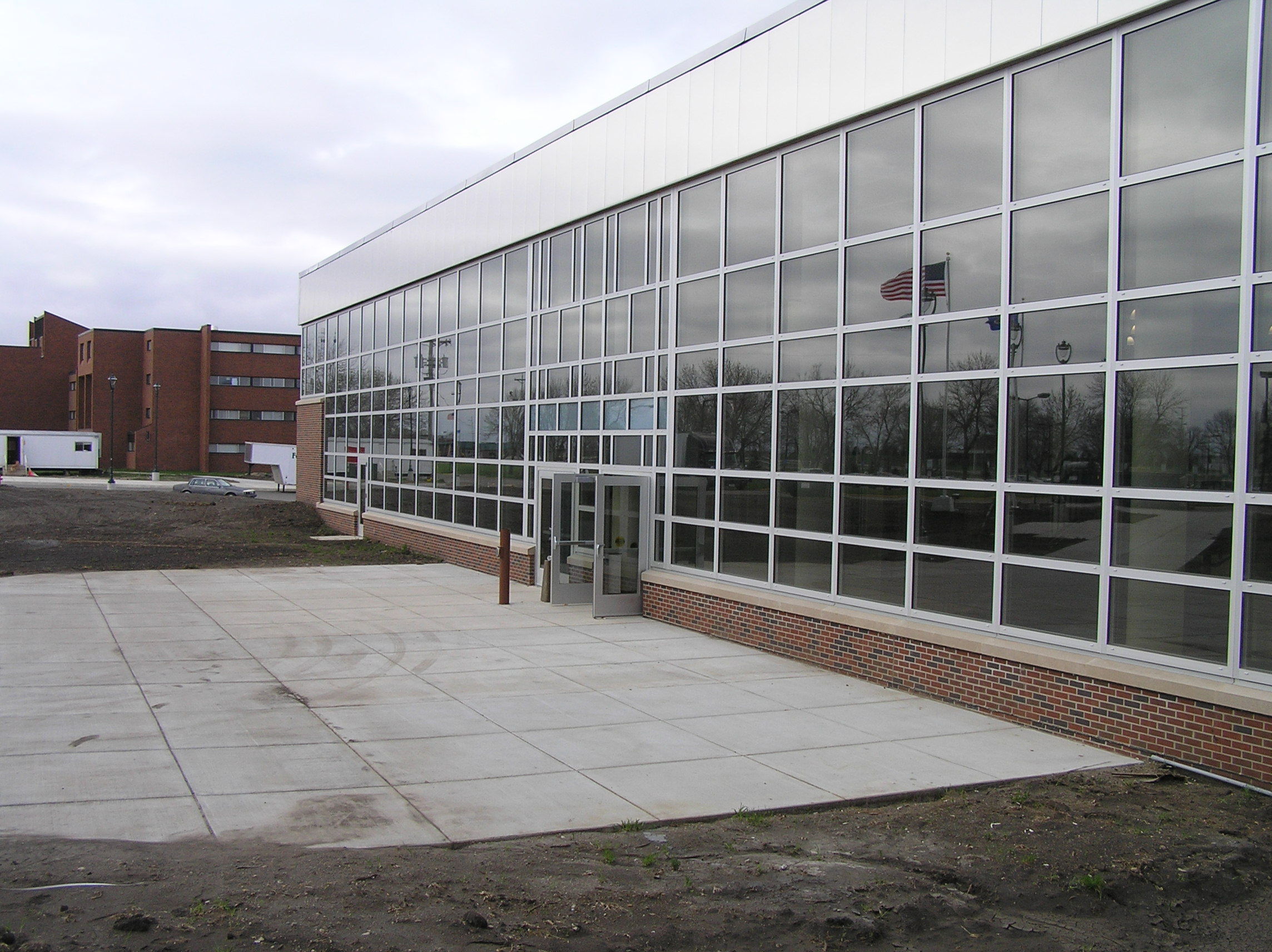
New SMSU Student Center, completed in 2005

On January 2, 2002, a fire destroyed the Student Center. The dome's concrete framework was incorporated into the new student and conference center and is still visible in the food court area. The new center was completed in 2005. It features a replica of the original dome with the words "Student Center Dome: 1972–2002" written on it at the Alumni Heritage Center, near the Mustang Zone in the upper level.

In 2005 SMSU developed the first bachelor's degree culinology program in the nation to be approved by the Research Chefs Association.

On September 6, 2008, the new Regional Event Center officially opened on the western edge of campus. The athletic field was named Mattke Field after the old field, and in honor of past athletic director Glenn Mattke. The center is used by the Mustang football and soccer teams, as well as teams from Marshall High School, and for other regional activities, such as concerts. It took two years and $16 million to complete.

== Academics ==
Southwest Minnesota State University provides undergraduate education in the liberal arts and professional studies. The most popular undergraduate majors are business administration and education. It also has specialized graduate programs in education, special education, and business administration. The MBA program has degree options in marketing, leadership, and the general MBA. Students can take classes both onsite and online. The graduate school does not have a student senate, but there is an MBA student organization. A critical element of the undergraduate and graduate business programs' success is the Southwest Marketing Advisory Center, where students can do research on actual businesses.

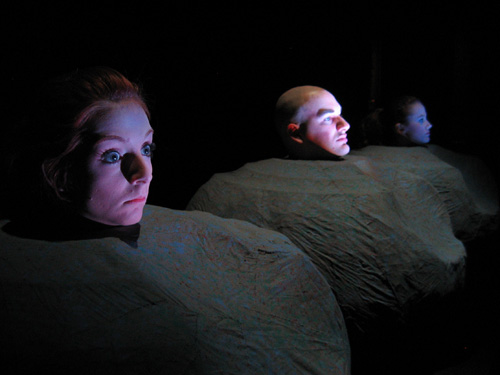
Theatre students in a production of Play by Samuel Beckett

In addition to being regionally accredited by the Higher Learning Commission, SMSU's programs are also accredited by the National Association of Schools of Music, the Minnesota Board of Teaching, the American Chemical Society and the Council on Social Work Education.

== Campus ==
Undergraduate demographics as of Fall 2023
Race and ethnicity	Total
White	71%
Black	8%
Hispanic	8%
International student	5%
Two or more races	3%
Asian	2%
Unknown	2%
Economic diversity
Low-income (Note: The percentage of students who received an income-based federal Pell grant intended for low-income students.)	35%
Affluent (Note: The percentage of students who are a part of the American middle class at the bare minimum.)	65%

Most of the SMSU campus was constructed between 1965 and 1973 according to a unified plan. The brick and concrete buildings are interconnected by tunnels and enclosed walkways, providing a continuous and controlled environment during both summer and winter. The residence halls are not connected. There are many courtyards with gardens between the buildings. The campus is virtually barrier-free, allowing easy access to students in wheelchairs.

The university's residence halls were named by the students during the late 1960s and reflect various themes and values of the times, e.g. Aquarius, Casa Futura, Methedras and Kama Sutra. Armstrong Hall was named after astronaut Neil Armstrong in honor of his trip to the moon in 1969. Manchester Hall was named for pop singer Melissa Manchester after a concert she gave on campus.

In 2009 the university opened a new dorm named Sweetland Hall in honor of a late president, Douglas Sweetland.

Residence halls:

- Traditional Halls – Six complexes of four connected halls that were built in the 1960s and feature a common bathroom for the whole floor.
- Sweetland Hall – A new complex with around 250 beds with a bathroom shared by suit-mates (two to four people).
- Foundation Apartments – Apartment style residence hall with laundry and kitchen appliances in each apartment.

There are no fraternities or sororities on campus.

=== Organizations ===
The Southwest Marketing Advisory Center (SMAC) is located on the second floor of the Science and Technology building, Room 203. SMAC is a self-funded entity within the academic marketing program at Southwest State. Its mission is to serve the marketing and research needs of southwestern Minnesota while giving real-world experience to junior, senior and graduate-level student employees.

Each student attending Southwest Minnesota State University pays a 43-cent per credit fee to fund the Minnesota State University Student Association, a student-led nonprofit organization that advocates on behalf of all students.

== Athletics ==
The school athletic teams are the Mustangs. Their colors are the prairie colors of brown and gold.

The Mustangs compete in the Northern Sun Intercollegiate Conference (NSIC), which is a part of NCAA Division II. Programs for men include basketball, wheelchair basketball, baseball, cross country, track, football, and wrestling. The programs for women are basketball, cross country, golf, soccer, softball, tennis, volleyball and swimming.

== Museums and public attractions ==
SMSU features several facilities that are open to the general public and school groups.

- The SMSU Museum of Natural History is focused on the plants and animals native to Minnesota.
- The SMSU Art Museum comprises two art galleries: the William Whipple Art Gallery I and II, named after a former dean of Humanities and Fine Arts at Southwest. Gallery I is in the SMSU library, and the smaller Gallery II is on the second floor of Founders Hall. The museum also features art on display at various locations around campus.
- The SMSU Museum of Indigenous Americans features Native American artifacts including pottery, artwork, baskets, projectile points
- The SMSU Planetarium is in the Science and Math Building and features a variety of laser and multi-media presentations. There is also a rooftop observation deck and telescopes for public night viewing of the sky.
- The Greenhouse is open to the public during regular school hours. The collection includes cacti, aloes, agaves, bananas, pineapples, palms, cycads and herbs. There are informational displays about many plants. Biology, agronomy and environmental science students carry out plant experiments there.
- The ADM & SMSU Environmental Learning Area is a 22-acre (8.9 ha) ADM & SMSU Environmental Learning Area on the northwest corner of campus, by Mattke Field. The open area features trails through different ecosystems including prairie, woodlands, ponds and marsh.

== Notable alumni ==
- Alvin Ashley, former Arena Football League player
- Brad Bigler, collegiate basketball coach
- Chuck Brown, state representative
- Leland Bush, judge of the District Court of Minnesota
- Matt Fletcher, collegiate basketball coach
- Dennis Hutter, collegiate basketball coach
- Kory Kath, state representative
- Jeff Loots, former Arena Football League player
- Bill Northey, Iowa Secretary of Agriculture
- Alan Roach, NFL public address announcer
- Alaura Sharp, women's basketball coach
- Marty Seifert, former Minnesota House minority leader
- Barton Sutter, poet and playwright
- Josh Turek, U.S. Senator-elect from Iowa and wheelchair basketball paralympian
- Isiah Whitlock, Jr., actor

== See also ==
- List of colleges and universities in Minnesota
