= Southwest Minnesota State Mustangs =

- University: Southwest Minnesota State University
- Conference: Northern Sun Intercollegiate Conference
- NCAA: Division II
- Athletic director: Travis Whipple
- Location: Marshall, Minnesota
- Varsity teams: 14
- Football stadium: Mattke Field at The Schwan Regional Event Center
- Basketball arena: Recreation/Athletic Facility
- Baseball stadium: Alumni Field
- Other venues: Physical Education Gym; Don Palm Natatorium
- Mascot: Stanger
- Nickname: Mustangs
- Colors: Brown and Vegas gold
- Website: smsumustangs.com

The Southwest Minnesota State Mustangs (also SMSU Mustangs and formerly Southwest State Mustangs) are the athletic teams that represent Southwest Minnesota State University, located in Marshall, Minnesota, in NCAA Division II intercollegiate sports. The Mustangs compete as members of the Northern Sun Intercollegiate Conference for all 14 varsity sports. SMSU has been competing since 1969, but has been a part of the conference since before the merger of the Northern Intercollegiate Conference and the Northern Sun Conference that formed the NSIC. SMSU moved with the NSIC from the NAIA to NCAA Division II affiliation in 1992.

== Varsity teams ==
=== List of teams ===
Men's sports

- Baseball
- Basketball
- Cross Country
- Football
- Track & Field
- Wheelchair Basketball
- Wrestling

Women's sports

- Basketball
- Cross Country
- Golf
- Soccer
- Softball
- Swimming and Diving
- Track & Field
- Volleyball

== Mustangs NFL Draft picks ==
Southwest Minnesota State Mustangs in the National Football League draft
Year	Round	Team	Player	Position
1992	7	New England Patriots	Wayne Hawkins	Wide receiver
1991	10	Atlanta Falcons	Walter Sutton	Wide receiver

== Sports culture ==
The student booster club for basketball is the Mustang Maniacs. Their slogan is, "Our team loves us and our opponents fear us". An annual basketball tradition is Hawaiian Night, which usually coincides with the Winter Meltdown festival held during the second week of the Spring Semester (which lasts from early January through early May).

== Non-varsity sports ==
=== Intramural sports ===
Intramural sports include badminton, basketball, flag football, floor hockey, broomball, racquetball, softball, tennis, ultimate Frisbee, and volleyball. The Mustang Rugby Club competes in the Minnesota Rugby Union (USA Rugby) and won the Minnesota Division III Championship in 2002. Recently the Mustangs Rugby Club won the Minnesota Division IIIB championship in 2010.
